= Oliver Nelson discography =

This is the discography for American jazz musician Oliver Nelson.

== As leader/co-leader ==
Year recorded	Album	Notes	Label	Year released
1959	Meet Oliver Nelson	Quintet with Kenny Dorham and Ray Bryant	Prestige	1959
1960	Taking Care of Business	Quintet with Johnny "Hammond" Smith and Lem Winchester	Prestige	1960
1960	Screamin' the Blues	Sextet with Eric Dolphy and Richard Williams	Prestige	1961
1960	Nocturne	Quintet with Lem Winchester	Prestige	1961
1960	Soul Battle	Sextet with King Curtis and Jimmy Forrest	Prestige	1962
1961	The Blues and the Abstract Truth	Septet with Bill Evans, Roy Haynes, Eric Dolphy, Paul Chambers and Freddie Hubbard	Impulse!	1961
1961	Straight Ahead	Quintet with Eric Dolphy	Prestige	1961
1961	Main Stem	Sextet with Joe Newman	Prestige	1962
1961	Afro/American Sketches	Oliver Nelson Orchestra	Prestige	1962
1962	Impressions of Phaedra	Oliver Nelson Orchestra	United Artists	1962
1962-1963	Full Nelson	Oliver Nelson Orchestra	Verve	1963
1964	Fantabulous	Oliver Nelson Orchestra	Argo	1964
1964	More Blues and the Abstract Truth	Sextet/Septet/Octet arranged and conducted by Oliver Nelson	Impulse!	1965
1965	Rita Reys Meets Oliver Nelson	Rita Reys with Orchestra arranged and conducted by Oliver Nelson	Philips	1965
1966	Oliver Nelson Plays Michelle	Oliver Nelson Orchestra	Impulse!	1966
1966	Sound Pieces	Oliver Nelson Orchestra/Quartet	Impulse!	1967
1966	Happenings	Hank Jones and the Oliver Nelson Orchestra featuring Clark Terry	Impulse!	1966
1966	Encyclopedia of Jazz	Encyclopedia of Jazz All Stars [split album]	Verve	1967
1966-1967	The Sound of Feeling	Encyclopedia of Jazz All Stars [split album]	Verve	1968
1967	The Spirit of '67	Pee Wee Russell and the Oliver Nelson Orchestra	Impulse!	1967
1967	The Kennedy Dream	Oliver Nelson Orchestra	Impulse!	1967
1967	Live from Los Angeles	Oliver Nelson's Big Band	Impulse!	1967
1967	Jazzhattan Suite	Jazz Interactions Orchestra	Verve	1968
1968	Soulful Brass	Oliver Nelson with Steve Allen	Impulse!	1968
1969	Black, Brown and Beautiful	Oliver Nelson Orchestra	Flying Dutchman	1970
1970	Zig Zag	Original Motion Picture Score	MGM	1970
1970	In Tokyo	Nobuo Hara and His Sharps & Flats and Oliver Nelson	Columbia (Japan)	1970
1970	Berlin Dialogue for Orchestra	Oliver Nelson and the "Berlin Dreamband"	Flying Dutchman	1971
1971	Swiss Suite	Oliver Nelson Orchestra featuring Gato Barbieri and Eddie Vinson	Flying Dutchman	1972
1974	Oliver Edward Nelson in London with Oily Rags	Oliver Nelson with Oily Rags	Flying Dutchman	1974
1975	Skull Session	Oliver Nelson	Flying Dutchman	1975
1975	Stolen Moments	Oliver Nelson	East Wind	1975

== Compilations ==
- A Dream Deferred (Flying Dutchman 1969–75 [1976]) – Selections from Flying Dutchman albums + 2 previously unreleased tracks
- Back Talk (Chess, 1964 [1976]) with Lou Donaldson – Compilation of Argo & Cadet LPs Fantabulous and Rough House Blues
- Images (Prestige 1961 [1976]) with Eric Dolphy – Compilation of Prestige LPs Screamin' the Blues and Straight Ahead
- Three Dimensions (Impulse! 1961–66, [1978]) – Compilation of Impulse! LPs The Blues and the Abstract Truth and Sound Pieces + 2 previously unreleased tracks
- Black, Brown and Beautiful (Bluebird, 1970–75 [1989]) – reissue of Johnny Hodges Flying Dutchman LP 3 Shades of Blue + tracks from Oliver Edward Nelson in London with Oily Rags and Skull Session
- Verve Jazz Masters 48 (Verve, 1962–67 [1995]) – Selections from Verve albums
- The Argo, Verve and Impulse Big Band Studio Sessions (Mosaic, 1961-67 [2006])

== Film and Television Scores ==
- Dzjes Zien (1965) – Dutch Television Movie
- Ironside (1967–1972) – US TV Series
- Run for Your Life (1967) – US TV Series
- The Name of the Game (1968–1970) – US TV Series
- Death of a Gunfighter (1969) – US Movie
- It Takes a Thief (1969–1970) – US TV Series
- Zig Zag (1970) – US Movie
- Dial Hot Line (1970) – US TV Movie
- Skullduggery (1970) – US Movie
- Matt Lincoln (1970) – US TV Series
- Lady Sings the Blues (1971) – US Movie – arranger only
- Longstreet (1971) – US TV Series
- Night Gallery (1971–1972) – US TV Series
- Cutter (1972) – US TV Series
- Columbo (1972) – US TV Series
- Last Tango in Paris (1972) – French/Italian Movie
- Banacek (1973) – US TV Series
- I Love a Mystery (1973) – US TV Movie
- The Six Million Dollar Man (1973–1975) – US TV Series
- Chase (1973) – US TV series
- Casino on Wheels (1973) – US TV Movie
- The Alpha Caper (1973) – US TV Movie
- Money to Burn (1973) – US TV Movie
- Matt Helm (1975) – US TV Series
- The Bionic Woman (1976) – US TV Series

== As arranger/conductor ==
An additional sideman role may be present in these recordings.

With Gato Barbieri

- Last Tango in Paris (United Artists, 1973) – recorded in 1972
- El Gato (Flying Dutchman, 1975) – recorded in 1972

With Johnny Hodges

- The Eleventh Hour (Verve, 1962)
- 3 Shades of Blue (Flying Dutchman, 1970)

With Paul Horn

- Monday, Monday (RCA Victor, 1966)
- Paul Horn & The Concert Ensemble (Ovation, 1969)

With Kimiko Kasai

- Kimiko Kasai in Person (CBS/Sony (Japan), 1973)
- Thanks, Dear (CBS/Sony (Japan), 1974) – musical supervisor

With Herbie Mann

- My Kinda Groove (Atlantic, 1964)
- Latin Mann (Columbia, 1965)
- Today! (Atlantic, 1965)
- Our Mann Flute (Atlantic, 1966)

With Della Reese

- "Every Other Day"/"Soon" (ABC, 1967)
- I Gotta Be Me...This Trip Out (ABC, 1968)

With Buddy Rich

- Swingin' New Big Band (Pacific Jazz, 1966); 8 tracks
- The New One! (Pacific Jazz, 1967); one track only
- Rich in London (RCA, 1971); one track only

With Diana Ross

- Lady Sings the Blues (Motown, 1972)
- Blue (Motown, 1972)

With Shirley Scott

- For Members Only (Impulse!, 1963)
- Great Scott!! (Impulse!, 1964)
- Roll 'Em: Shirley Scott Plays the Big Bands (Impulse!, 1966)

With Jimmy Smith

- Bashin': The Unpredictable Jimmy Smith (Verve, 1962)
- Hobo Flats (Verve, 1963)
- Who's Afraid of Virginia Woolf? (Verve, 1964)
- Monster (Verve, 1965)
- Got My Mojo Workin' (Verve, 1965)
- Peter & the Wolf (Verve, 1966)
- Hoochie Coochie Man (Verve, 1966)
- Jimmy & Wes: The Dynamic Duo (Verve, 1966) with Wes Montgomery
- Further Adventures of Jimmy and Wes (Verve, 1966) with Wes Montgomery
- Livin' It Up! (Verve, 1968)

With Billy Taylor

- Right Here, Right Now! (Capitol Records, 1963)
- Midnight Piano (Capitol, 1964)

With Leon Thomas

- The Leon Thomas Album (Flying Dutchman, 1970)
- Leon Thomas in Berlin (Flying Dutchman, 1971)

With Joe Williams

- Jump for Joy (RCA Victor, 1963)
- Me and the Blues (RCA Victor, 1964)

With Nancy Wilson

- How Glad I Am (Capitol, 1964)
- Today, My Way (Capitol, 1964)
- A Touch of Today (Capitol, 1966)
- Just for Now (Capitol, 1966)
- Lush Life (Capitol, 1967)
- Welcome to My Love (Capitol, 1967)

With Kai Winding

- Suspense Themes in Jazz (Verve, 1962)
- More Brass (Verve, 1966)

With others

- Faye Adams, "You Can Trust In Me"/"Goodnight My Love"' (Prestige, 1962) – 7inch SP
- Cannonball Adderley, Domination (Capitol, 1965)
- Steve Allen, Soulful Brass #2 (Flying Dutchman, 1969)
- Air Pocket, Fly On (East Wind, 1975) – producer
- Louis Armstrong, Louis Armstrong and His Friends (Flying Dutchman/Amsterdam, 1971) – recorded in 1970
- Elek Bacsik, Bird and Dizzy: A Musical Tribute (Flying Dutchman, 1975) – arranger, conductor
- James Brown, Soul on Top (King, 1970) – recorded in 1969
- Mel Brown, Chicken Fat (Impulse!, 1967)
- Ray Brown and Milt Jackson, Ray Brown / Milt Jackson (Verve, 1965)
- Ruth Brown, "Secret Love"/"Time After Time" (Noslen, 1963)
- Henry Cain, The Funky Organ-ization Of Henry Cain (Capitol, 1967)
- Betty Carter, 'Round Midnight (Atco, 1963)
- Ray Charles, A Portrait of Ray (ABC/Tangerine, 1968)
- Lou Donaldson, Rough House Blues (Cadet, 1964)
- Jean DuShon, Feeling Good (Cadet, 1966)
- Lorraine Ellison, Heart & Soul (Warner Bros., 1966)
- Art Farmer, Listen to Art Farmer and the Orchestra (Mercury, 1962)
- Maynard Ferguson, Come Blow Your Horn (Cameo, 1964)
- Don Goldie, Trumpet Exodus (Verve, 1962)
- Leo Gooden, Leo Sings with Strings (L.G., 1963)
- Jackie and Roy, Changes (Verve, 1966)
- Jimmy Grissom, "I've Got You On My Mind"/"Lover's Reverie" (Prestige, 1962)
- Nobuo Hara and His Sharps & Flats, 3-2-1-0 (Nippon Columbia, 1969)
- Johnny Hartman, I Love Everybody (ABC-Paramount, 1967)
- Richard Holmes, Six Million Dollar Man (RCA/Flying Dutchman, 1975)
- Paul Humphrey, Shelly Manne, Willie Bobo & Louie Bellson, The Drum Session (Philips (Japan), 1974) – producer
- Yujiro Ishihara, Nostalia (Teichiku Entertainment (Japan), 1974)
- Etta Jones, So Warm (Prestige, 1961)
- Ramsey Lewis, Country Meets the Blues (Argo, 1962); reeds only
- Lloyd G. Mayers, A Taste of Honey (United Artists Jazz, 1962)
- Carmen McRae, Portrait of Carmen (Atlantic, 1967)
- Thelonious Monk, Monk's Blues (Columbia, 1968)
- Wes Montgomery, Goin' Out of My Head (Verve, 1965)
- Lee Morgan, Delightfulee (Blue Note, 1966)
- Esther Phillips, Esther Phillips Sings (Atlantic, 1955)
- Irene Reid, Room for One More (Verve, 1965)
- Sonny Rollins, Alfie (Impulse!, 1966)
- Jimmy Rushing, Every Day I Have the Blues (BluesWay, 1967)
- Doc Severinsen, Rhapsody for Now! (RCA, 1973)
- Bud Shank, Girl in Love (World Pacific, 1966)
- Ringo Starr, Sentimental Journey (Apple, 1969)
- Carl Stokes, The Mayor and the People (Flying Dutchman, 1970)
- Jack Teagarden, Jack Teagarden (Verve, 1962)
- The Temptations, The Temptations in a Mellow Mood (Gordy, 1967)
- Clark Terry, Clark Terry Plays the Jazz Version of All American (Moodsville, 1962)
- Bob Thiele, I Saw Pinetop Spit Blood (Flying Dutchman, 1975)
- The Three Sounds, Coldwater Flat (Blue Note, 1968)
- Cal Tjader, Soul Burst (Verve, 1966)
- Stanley Turrentine, Joyride (Blue Note, 1965)

== As arranger and sideman ==
With Gene Ammons

- Soul Summit Vol. 2 (Prestige, 1961 [1962]; arranged two tracks)
- Late Hour Special (Prestige, 1961 [1964]; arranged 4 tracks)
- Velvet Soul (Prestige, 1961 [1964]; arranged 1 track)

With Count Basie

- Afrique (Flying Dutchman, 1970); also tenor saxophone

With Eddie "Lockjaw" Davis

- Trane Whistle (Prestige, 1960); also alto saxophone

With Jimmy Forrest

- Soul Street (New Jazz, 1962); tenor saxophone on one track

With Etta Jones

- From the Heart (Prestige, 1962); alto saxophone on 4 tracks

With Frank Wess

- Southern Comfort (Prestige, 1962); also tenor saxophone

With Lem Winchester

- Lem's Beat (Prestige, 1960); also tenor saxophone

== Credited as sideman only ==
With Chris Connor

- Free Spirits (Atlantic, 1962)
- Richard Rodgers' No Strings: An After-Theatre Version with Bobby Short (Atlantic, 1962)

With Red Garland

- Soul Burnin' (Prestige, 1961)
- Rediscovered Masters (Prestige, 1977) – rec. 1961

With Etta Jones

- Something Nice (Prestige, 1961) – rec. 1960
- Hollar! (Prestige, 1963) – rec. 1960

With Quincy Jones

- I Dig Dancers (Mercury, 1960)
- The Quintessence (Impulse!, 1961)
- The Pawnbroker (Mercury, 1965)

With Louis Jordan

- "If You're So Smart How Come You Ain't Rich"/"How Blue Can You Get" (Decca, 1951)
- "Please Don't Leave Me"/"Three-Handed Woman" (Decca, 1951)
- "Trust in Me"/"Cock-a-Doodle Doo"/"Work Baby Work" (Decca, 1951)
- "May Every Day Be Christmas"/"Bone Dry" (Decca, 1951)
- "Louisville Lodge Meeting"/"Work Baby Work" (Decca, 1951)
- "Slow Down" (Decca, 1952) – rec. 1951
- "Fat Sam from Birmingham" (Decca, 1953) – rec. 1951
- "There Must Be a Way" (Decca, 1953) – rec. 1951
- "Come And Get It" (Decca, 1954) – rec. 1951

With Leon Thomas

- Leon Thomas in Berlin (Flying Dutchman, 1970)
- Gold Sunrise on Magic Mountain (Mega/Flying Dutchman, 1971)

With others

- Cannonball Adderley, African Waltz (Riverside, 1961)
- Manny Albam, Jazz Goes to the Movies (Impulse!, 1962)
- Elek Bacsik, I Love You (Bob Thie, 1973)
- Louie Bellson, The Brilliant Bellson Sound (Verve, 1959)
- Clea Bradford, These Dues (Tru-Sound, 1961)
- Duke Ellington, Paris Blues (United Artists, 1962)
- J. J. Johnson, J.J.! (RCA Victor, 1964) – reeds
- Eddie Kirkland, It's the Blues Man! (Tru-Sound, 1962)
- Mundell Lowe, Satan in High Heels (soundtrack) (Charlie Parker, 1961)
- Gary McFarland, The Jazz Version of "How to Succeed in Business without Really Trying" (Verve, 1961)
- Joe Newman, Joe Newman Quintet at Count Basie's (Mercury, 1961)
- Shirley Scott, Blue Seven (Prestige, 1961)
- Johnny "Hammond" Smith, Talk That Talk (New Jazz, 1960)
