= Everybody Loves a Lover (album) =

Studio album by Shirley Scott
- Released: 1964
- Recorded: September 21 & 23, 1964
- Studios: Van Gelder Studio, Englewood Cliffs, NJ
- Genre: Jazz
- Labels: Impulse! A-73
- Producer: Bob Thiele

Shirley Scott chronology
Great Scott!! (1964)	Everybody Loves a Lover (1964)	Queen of the Organ (1964)

Everybody Loves a Lover is an album by jazz organist Shirley Scott recorded for the Impuse! label in 1964 and performed by Scott with Stanley Turrentine, Bob Cranshaw and Otis Finch. The album has not appeared on CD yet, but the first three tracks were released on the CD reissue of Turrentine's Let it Go.

== Reception ==
Professional ratings
Review scores
Source	Rating
Allmusic	3/5 stars

The Allmusic review by awarded the album 3 stars.

== Track listing ==
All compositions by Shirley Scott except as indicated

1. "Sent for You Yesterday (And Here You Come Today)" (Count Basie, Eddie Durham, Jimmy Rushing) - 5:38
2. "The Lamp Is Low" (Peter DeRose, Mitchell Parish, Maurice Ravel, Bert Shefter) - 8:04
3. "The Feeling of Jazz" (Duke Ellington, George T. Simon, Bobby Troup) - 4:16
4. "Everybody Loves a Lover" (Richard Adler, Robert Allen) - 8:00
5. "Little Miss Know It All" - 4:26
6. "Shirley" - 4:30
7. "Blue Bongo" (Bob Hammer, Bob Thiele) - 3:10

Recorded on September 21, 1964 (1-4) and September 23, 1964 (5-7).

== Personnel ==
- Shirley Scott - organ
- Stanley Turrentine - tenor saxophone (tracks 1–6)
- Bob Cranshaw - bass
- Otis Finch - drums
- Howard Collins, Barry Galbraith - guitar (tracks 5–7)
- Willie Rodriguez - percussion (tracks 5–7)

=== Production ===
- Bob Thiele - producer
- Rudy Van Gelder - engineer
