= Steve Johns (drummer) =

American jazz drummer and educator (born 1960)

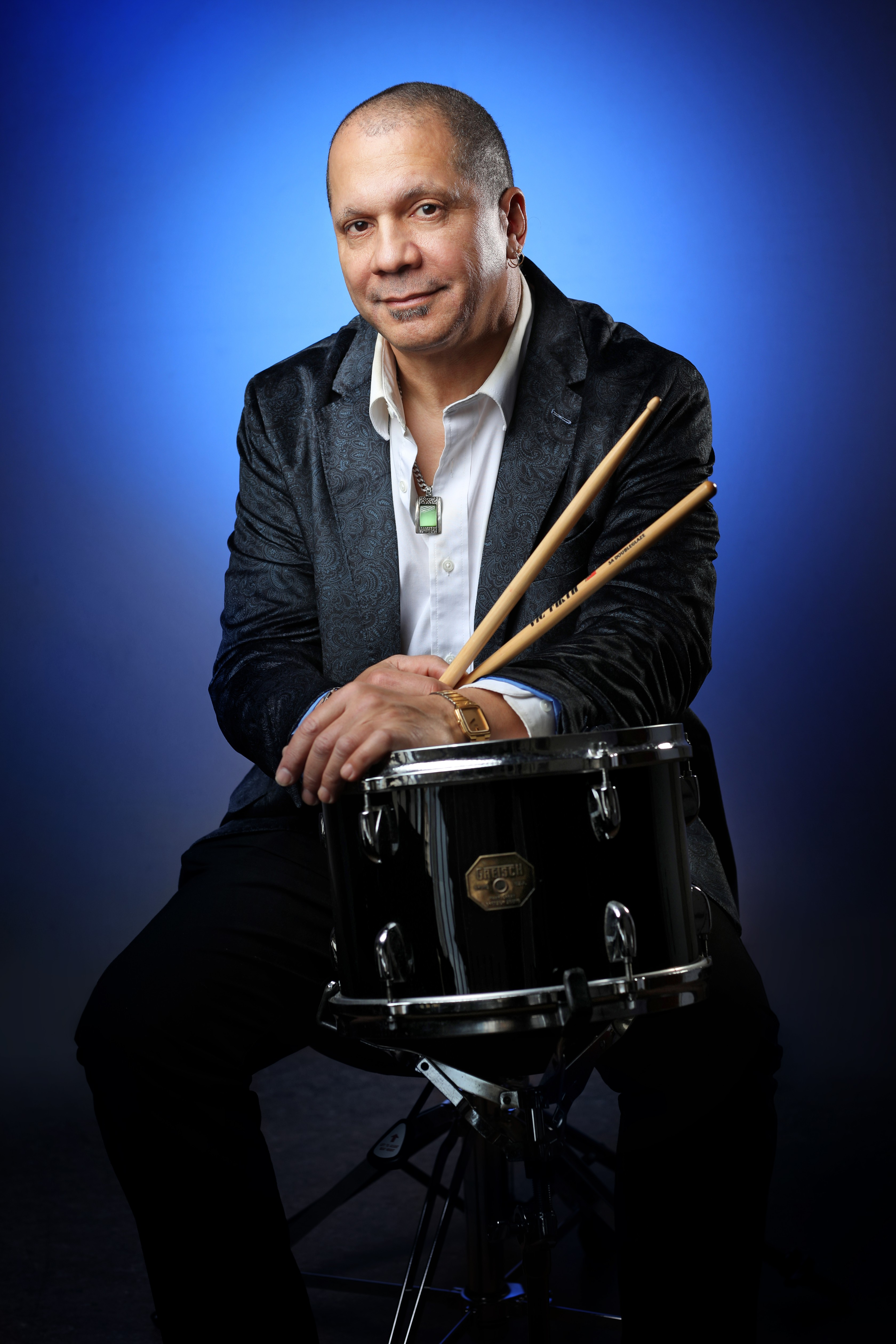
- Steve Johns - jazz drummer © 2023 by Christopher Drukker is licensed under Creative Commons Attribution-ShareAlike 4.0 International.

Background information
- Born: November 25, 1960 (age 65); Boston, United States
- Genre: Jazz
- Occupations: Musician, educator
- Instrument: Drums
- Website: stevejohnsjazz.com

Stephen Samuel Johns (born November 25, 1960) is an American jazz drummer and educator.

== Music career ==
Johns was born in Boston and started playing drums at the age of 9. His mother Goldie composed music. He studied with Alan Dawson in 1977 and attended the New England Conservatory of Music from 1979 to 1982. As a student, he won the Outstanding Drummer Award at the Notre Dame Collegiate Jazz Festival. In 1982, Johns moved to New York, where he played with John Hicks, Larry Coryell, Bobby Watson, Gary Bartz, Diane Schuur, Roy Hargrove, Randy Brecker, Stanley Turrentine, Thomas Chapin, and Benny Carter. He toured the US with the Count Basie Orchestra and Europe with the Gil Evans Orchestra and the Mingus Epitaph Orchestra conducted by Gunther Schuller. Johns played with George Russell's Living Time Orchestra from 1988 to 1993 and has been playing with the Mingus Big Band. He played in the Billy Taylor Trio on Jazz At The Kennedy Center, the radio show hosted by Taylor, for five years. More recently, he has played with Sonny Fortune and Bob DeVos.

Johns has taught at several music colleges, schools and jazz centers.

Reviewing his work on Shifting Sands and Playing For Keeps, David Orthman said: "Johns utilizes the drums and cymbals in something approximating an equal partnership... Changes in dynamics are frequent and unceremonious. A strong pocket is derived not only from the steady pulse of the ride cymbal, but from the manner in which he juxtaposes accents and patterns on the snare, bass, and tom toms."

== Personal life ==
Johns is married to tenor saxophonist Debbie Keefe. Their son Daryl Johns is a jazz bassist and songwriter.

== Selected discography ==
=== As leader ===
- No Saints No Sinners (Playscape, 2002)
- Family (CD Baby/Strikezone Records, 2014)
- Mythology (SteepleChase, 2025)

==== Collaborations ====
With Greg Murphy

- You Remind Me (Whaling City Sound, 2024)
- Snap Happy (Whaling City Sound, 2025)

With Bob DeVos

- Shifting Sands (Savant, 2006)
- Playing for Keeps (Savant, 2007)
- Shadow Box (American Showplace Music, 2013)

With Sonny Fortune

- Continuum (Sound Reason, 2004)
- You and the Night and the Music (18th & Vine, 2007)
- Last Night at Sweet Rhythm (Sound Reason, 2009)

=== As sideman ===
With Greg Murphy (jazz pianist)

- You Remind Me – Greg Murphy (Whaling City Sound: 2024)

With Chris Rogers

- Voyage Home' (Art Of Life, 2024)

With Mario Pavone

- Toulon Days (New World Records, 1992)
- Dancer's Tales (Knitting Factory Works, 1997)
- Street Songs (Playscape Recordings, 2013)

With Gary Smulyan

- More Treasures (Reservoir, 2007)
- High Noon: The Jazz Soul of Frankie Laine (Reservoir, 2009)

With Jessye Norman

- Roots: My Life, My Song (Sony, 2007)

With Thomas Chapin

- Third Force (Knitting Factory Works, 1991)
- Anima (Knitting Factory Works, 1992)
- I've Got Your Number (Arabesque, 1993)

With Alan Rosenthal

- Just Sayin' (Alan Rosenthal, 2011)

With Leon Thomas and Gary Bartz

- Precious Energy (Mapleshade, 1990)

With Ada Rovatti

- Under the Hat' (Nicolosi, 2007)

With Louis Bonilla

- !Escucha!' (Candid, 2000)

With Native Soul

- Soul Step' (Talking Drum Records, 2010)
- Rough Jazz' (Apria Records, 2006)
