= Main stem (disambiguation) =

A main stem is the final large channel of a riverine system.

It may also refer to:

- "Main Stem", Duke Ellington's single
- Main Stem, Oliver Nelson's album
