= Queen of the Organ =

Live album by Shirley Scott
- Released: 1965
- Recorded: December 5, 1964
- Venue: The Front Room, Newark, NJ
- Genre: Soul jazz
- Length: 34:42 original LP; 70:19 CD reissue
- Label: Impulse!
- Producer: Bob Thiele

Shirley Scott chronology
Everybody Loves a Lover (1964)	Queen of the Organ (1965)	Latin Shadows (1965)

Queen of the Organ is a live album by American jazz organist Shirley Scott, recorded in 1964 for the Impulse! label. The expanded CD reissue added four additional performances from the same gig as bonus tracks.

== Reception ==
The AllMusic review by Scott Yanow awarded the album 4½ stars, stating, "Overall, this is a pretty definitive live set... The musicians sound quite heated and consistently inspired. Highly recommended."

Professional ratings
Review scores
Source	Rating
AllMusic	4.5/5 stars

== Track listing ==
All compositions by Shirley Scott except as indicated

1. "Just in Time" (Betty Comden, Adolph Green, Jule Styne) - 7:34
2. "Squeeze Me (But Don't Tease Me)" (Duke Ellington, Lee Gaines) - 9:59
3. "Mean, Angry, Nasty and Lowdown" - 9:39 Bonus track on CD reissue
4. "Can't Buy Me Love" (John Lennon, Paul McCartney) - 9:11 Bonus track on CD reissue
5. "Like Blue" - 8:52 Bonus track on CD reissue
6. "Cute" (Neal Hefti) - 8:16 Bonus track on CD reissue
7. "Rapid Shave" (Dave Burns) - 8:28
8. "That's for Me" (Oscar Hammerstein II, Richard Rodgers) - 7:50
9. "The Theme" (Miles Davis) - 1:08

- Recorded at the Front Room in Newark, New Jersey, December 5, 1964

== Personnel ==
=== Musicians ===
- Shirley Scott – organ
- Stanley Turrentine – tenor saxophone
- Bob Cranshaw – bass
- Otis Finch – drums

=== Production ===
- Bob Thiele – producer
- Rudy Van Gelder – audio engineer
- Bob Hammer – liner notes
