= Curtis Peagler =

American jazz saxophonist (1929–1992)

- Born: September 17, 1929; Cincinnati, Ohio
- Died: December 19, 1992 (aged 63) Los Angeles, California
- Genres: Jazz, R&B, hard bop, straight-ahead jazz
- Occupation: Musician
- Instrument: Alto saxophone
- Labels: Prestige, Concord, Pablo
- Formerly of: Modern Jazz Disciples

Curtis Peagler (September 17, 1929 — December 19, 1992) was an American jazz saxophonist who specialized in straight-ahead jazz and hard bop.

== Early life ==
Peagler was born in Cincinnati, Ohio. He played in the blues genre during the first phase of his career, before joining the U.S. Army for two years from 1953 to 1955.

== Career ==
Around 1960 Peagler led a band called the Modern Jazz Disciples, which specialized in hard bop. The band included a euphonium and normaphone player, William "Hicky" Kelley, an unusual instrument for jazz musicians to play during the era. The Disciples recorded two albums: the self-titled Modern Jazz Disciples (1959) and Right Down Front (1962). Peagler recorded as a member of Lem Winchester's sextet that recorded the album Lem's Beat in 1960, just a year before the vibraphone player died of a gun accident.

Peagler moved to Los Angeles in 1962. After playing with Ray Charles during the late 1960s, he became a member of Count Basie's Band during the 1970s. He played in Cheatham's Sweet Baby Blues Band, led by Jeanie and Jimmy Cheatham, shortly before his death.

== Death ==
In 1992, Peagler died following heart surgery at Cedars-Sinai Medical Center in Los Angeles.

== Legacy ==
Jazz critic Leonard Feather described Peagler as "an exciting, extrovert saxophonist who lent color to every band he played in, from Ray Charles in the 1960s to Count Basie in the ‘70s." James Nadal referred to him as "a solid, hard working sax man whose performance and recording resume was quite impressive."

== Discography ==
=== As leader ===
- For Basie and Duke (1982)
- I'll Be Around (1986)
- Disciples Blues (2001)

=== As sideman ===
==== With Count Basie ====
- Have a Nice Day (1971)

==== With Ray Charles ====
- My Kind of Jazz (1970)

==== With Jimmy Cheatham ====
- Sweet Baby Blues (1985)

==== With Freddie Redd ====
- Everybody Loves a Winner (1990)

==== With Mel Tormé ====
- Night at the Concord Pavilion (1990)

==== With Lem Winchester ====
- Lem's Beat (1960)
