= Blues and the Soulful Truth =

Studio album by Leon Thomas
- Released: 1973
- Recorded: November 13, 1972
- Studio: RCA Studio A, New York City
- Genre: Jazz
- Length: 39:08
- Label: Flying Dutchman; FD/FDS 10155
- Producer: Bob Thiele

Leon Thomas chronology
Gold Sunrise on Magic Mountain (1971)	Blues and the Soulful Truth (1973)	Full Circle (1973)

Blues and the Soulful Truth is an album by American jazz vocalist and percussionist Leon Thomas recorded in 1972 and released by the Flying Dutchman label.

== Reception ==
Professional ratings
Review scores
Source	Rating
AllMusic	4.5/5 stars

AllMusic reviewer Thom Jurek stated: "Blues and the Soulful Truth is among the artist's most enduring performances, either as a leader or sideman ... In sum, Blues and the Soulful Truth (Which does echo Oliver Nelson's Blues and the Abstract Truth in vision as well as title), is a tour through the depth and dimension of Thomas' mind-blowing abilities as a singer in a wide range of African American musical traditions, proving at the time, and now again, that he was far more than a free jazz singer. ... This album is a singular achievement, even among the fine recordings in Thomas' own catalogue, and should be considered first by those curious enough to look into his work -- you won't be disappointed no matter what you find, but this one will take you places you never anticipated going".

== Track listing ==
All compositions by Leon Thomas except where noted

1. "Let's Go Down to Lucy" (Alfred Ellis, Leon Thomas) – 4:27
2. "L-O-V-E" – 2:54
3. "Gypsy Queen" (Gábor Szabó, George David Weiss) – 10:19
4. "Love Each Other" – 3:16
5. "Shape Your Mind to Die" (Neal Creque, Leon Thomas) – 5:22
6. "Boom-Boom-Boom" (John Lee Hooker) – 4:52
7. "China Doll" (Alfred Ellis, Jesse Kilpatrick, Leon Thomas) – 5:07
8. "C.C. Rider" (Traditional) – 6:23

== Personnel ==
- Leon Thomas − vocals, percussion, firecrackers
- Pee Wee Ellis – tenor saxophone, soprano saxophone, baritone saxophone, piano, organ, coat hangers, marimba, firecrackers, arranger
- Neal Creque - electric piano, piano
- John Eckert – trumpet (tracks 1 & 4)
- Dick Griffin – trombone (tracks 1 & 4)
- Cecil Payne – baritone saxophone (tracks 1 & 4)
- Cornell Dupree (tracks 1, 2 & 4), Larry Coryell (tracks 6 & 8) – guitar
- John Blair - vitar (track 5)
- Stanley Clarke (track 3), Gordon Edwards (tracks 1, 2 & 4) – electric bass
- Donald Pate – bass, electric bass (tracks 6 & 8)
- Bernard Purdie (tracks 1, 2, 4 & 6–8), Jesse Kilpatrick (track 5), Airto Moreira (track 3) – drums
- Baba Feme – percussion (tracks 5 & 7)
- Gene Golden – congas (track 3)
- Lani Groves (track 2 & 4), Carl Hall (tracks 2, 4 & 7), Hilda Harris (track 7), Albertine Robinson (track 7), Tasha Thomas (track 2 & 4) – vocals
- Lillian Seyfert, Tony May – firecrackers (track 3)
