= Spirits Known and Unknown =

Studio album by Leon Thomas
- Released: 1970
- Recorded: October 21 & 22, 1969
- Studio: New York City
- Genre: Jazz
- Length: 37:06
- Labels: Flying Dutchman; FD/FDS 10115
- Producer: Bob Thiele

Leon Thomas chronology
Spirits Known and Unknown (1970)	The Leon Thomas Album (1970)

Spirits Known and Unknown, subtitled New Vocal Frontiers, is the debut album by American jazz vocalist and percussionist Leon Thomas recorded in 1969 and released by the Flying Dutchman label.

== Reception ==
Professional ratings
Review scores
Source	Rating
AllMusic	4/5 stars
Christgau's Record Guide	B+

AllMusic reviewer Thom Jurek stated: "Leon Thomas' debut solo recording after his tenure with Pharoah Sanders is a fine one. ... Thomas' patented yodel is in fine shape here, displayed alongside his singular lyric style and scat singing trademark... Ultimately, this is among Thomas' finest moments on vinyl, proving his versatility and accessibility to an audience who, for too long already, had associated him too closely with the avant-garde and free jazz". Critic Robert Christgau said "The subtitle, "New Vocal Frontiers," is accurate. Thomas is the only really interesting jazz singer to have appeared in a very long time. He even yodels".

== Track listing ==
All compositions by Leon Thomas except where noted

1. "The Creator Has a Master Plan (Peace)" (Thomas, Pharoah Sanders) − 4:23
2. "One" − 3:07
3. "Echoes" − 5:38
4. "Song for My Father" (Horace Silver) − 5:17
5. "Damn Nam (Ain't Goin' to Vietnam)" − 4:42
6. "Malcolm's Gone" (Thomas, Sanders) − 8:35
7. "Let the Rain Fall On Me" (Aaron Bell, Carla Huston) − 5:24

== Personnel ==
- Leon Thomas − vocals, percussion
- Lonnie Liston Smith - piano
- Cecil McBee, Richard Davis - bass guitar
- Roy Haynes - drums
- Richard Landrum − bongos
- Little Rock (pseudonym for Pharoah Sanders) - tenor saxophone
- James Spaulding − alto saxophone
