= Lem Winchester with Feeling =

Studio album by Lem Winchester
- Released: 1961
- Recorded: October 7, 1960
- Studio: Van Gelder Studio, Englewood Cliffs, New Jersey
- Genre: Jazz
- Length: 36:10
- Label: Moodsville; MVLP 11
- Producer: Esmond Edwards

Lem Winchester chronology
Another Opus (1960)	Lem Winchester with Feeling (1961)

Lem Winchester with Feeling is an album by vibraphonist Lem Winchester which was recorded in 1960 and released on the Moodsville label the following year.

== Reception ==
Professional ratings
Review scores
Source	Rating
AllMusic	3/5 stars
All About Jazz	3.5/5 stars
DownBeat	4/5 stars
The Penguin Guide to Jazz Recordings	3/4 stars

The contemporaneous DownBeat reviewer applauded the absence of sentimentality in Winchester's playing. AllMusic reviewer Scott Yanow states: "Vibraphonist Lem Winchester's final recording was made just three months before his accidental death, which occurred when he was demonstrating a gun trick. Although originally recorded for the Prestige subsidiary Moodsville (a series that emphasized slow, melodic ballads), there is a fair amount of variety on Winchester's last effort. ... Winchester mixes medium-tempo performances with slower numbers and shows that his style was growing away from his original Milt Jackson influence". All About Jazz called it "an enjoyable session" observing "Ballads and relaxed tempos prevail, and Winchester is consisently [sic] laid back.".

== Track listing ==
1. "Why Don't They Understand" (Jack Fishman, Joe Henderson) – 4:31
2. "Butterfly" (Patrica Bradshaw) – 4:30
3. "With a Song in My Heart" (Richard Rodgers, Lorenz Hart) – 4:28
4. "But Beautiful" (Jimmy Van Heusen, Johnny Burke) – 4:10
5. "Skylark" (Hoagy Carmichael, Johnny Mercer) – 6:39
6. "To Love and Be Loved" (Van Heusen, Sammy Cahn) – 3:48
7. "The Kids" (Lem Winchester) – 3:59
8. "My Romance" (Rodgers, Hart) – 4:05

== Personnel ==
- Lem Winchester – vibraphone
- Richard Wyands – piano
- George Duvivier – bass
- Roy Haynes – drums
