= Winchester Special =

Studio album by Lem Winchester and Benny Golson
- Released: 1959
- Recorded: September 25, 1959
- Studio: Van Gelder Studio, Englewood Cliffs, New Jersey
- Genre: Jazz
- Length: 39:28
- Label: New Jazz; NJLP 8223
- Producer: Esmond Edwards

Lem Winchester chronology
Lem Winchester and the Ramsey Lewis Trio (1958)	Winchester Special (1959)	Lem's Beat (1960)

Benny Golson chronology
Groovin' with Golson (1959)	Winchester Special (1959)	Gettin' with It (1959)

Winchester Special is an album by vibraphonist Lem Winchester with saxophonist Benny Golson recorded in 1959 and released on the New Jazz label.

== Reception ==
Professional ratings
Review scores
Source	Rating
Allmusic	4/5 stars
DownBeat	4/5 stars
The Penguin Guide to Jazz Recordings	2.5/4 stars

Scott Yanow of Allmusic states: "The music falls between bop and hard bop with consistently swinging solos that are generally fairly inventive. This was one of Winchester's three recordings for the New Jazz label; all are easily recommended to straight ahead jazz fans".

== Track listing ==
1. "Down Fuzz" (Lem Winchester) – 10:02
2. "If I Were a Bell" (Frank Loesser) – 4:02
3. "Will You Still Be Mine?" (Tom Adair, Matt Dennis) – 7:00
4. "Mysticism" (Len Foster) – 7:31
5. "How Are Things in Glocca Morra?" (Burton Lane, Yip Harburg) – 4:11
6. "The Dude" (Winchester) – 6:42

== Personnel ==
- Lem Winchester – vibraphone
- Benny Golson – tenor saxophone (tracks 1 & 3–6)
- Tommy Flanagan – piano
- Wendell Marshall – bass
- Art Taylor – drums
