= Further Adventures of Jimmy and Wes =

Studio album by Wes Montgomery, Jimmy Smith
- Released: 1968
- Recorded: September 21 & 28, 1966
- Studio: Van Gelder Studio, Englewood Cliffs, New Jersey
- Genre: Jazz
- Length: 32:56
- Label: Verve
- Producer: Creed Taylor

Wes Montgomery chronology
| Jimmy & Wes: The Dynamic Duo (1966) | Further Adventures of Jimmy and Wes (1968) | Tequila (1966) |

Jimmy Smith chronology
| Jimmy & Wes: The Dynamic Duo (1966) | Further Adventures of Jimmy and Wes (1966) | Respect (1967) |

Further Adventures of Jimmy and Wes is an album by American jazz guitarist Wes Montgomery and organist Jimmy Smith. It was recorded in 1966 with Jimmy & Wes: The Dynamic Duo but was not released until 1968.

== Reception ==
Professional ratings
Review scores
| Source | Rating |
|---|---|
| AllMusic | 4/5 stars |
| The Penguin Guide to Jazz | 3/4 stars |

Richard S. Ginell reviewed the reissue for AllMusic, writing that the album:

"picks up where Dynamic Duo left off, digging a little further into the one-time-only Wes Montgomery/Jimmy Smith sessions and coming up with more fine music — mellower in general than Dynamic Duo but first-class nonetheless. Unlike most of the studio sessions from this time, Montgomery gets plenty of room for his single-string work as well as his famous octaves, and both techniques find him in full, mature bloom, needing fewer notes in which to say more (Smith, of course, is precisely the opposite)."

== Track listing ==
1. "King of the Road" (Roger Miller) – 4:13
2. "Maybe September" (Percy Faith, Ray Evans, Jay Livingston) – 6:24
3. "O.G.D. (a.k.a. Road Song)" (Wes Montgomery) – 6:08
4. "Call Me" (Tony Hatch) – 3:13
5. "Milestones" (Miles Davis) – 4:12
6. "Mellow Mood" (Jimmy Smith) – 8:44
7. "'Round Midnight" - (bonus track) (Cootie Williams, Thelonious Monk, Bernie Hanighen) – 7:18

== Personnel ==
=== Musicians ===
- Jimmy Smith – Hammond organ
- Wes Montgomery – guitar
- Grady Tate – drums
- Ray Barretto – percussion

Additional musicians on "Milestones" and "'Round Midnight"

- Bob Ashton, Danny Bank, Jerry Dodgion, Jerome Richardson, Phil Woods – woodwinds
- Clark Terry, Ernie Royal, Jimmy Maxwell, Joe Newman – trumpet
- Jimmy Cleveland, Melba Liston, Quentin Jackson – trombone
- Tony Studd – bass trombone
- Richard Davis – bass
- Oliver Nelson – arranger, conductor

=== Production ===
- Creed Taylor – producer
- Val Valentin – director of engineering
- Rudy Van Gelder – engineer
- Dick Smith – art direction
- Chuck Stewart – photography
- Michael Zwerin – liner notes
- Gene Santoro – reissue liner notes
