= Hustlin' (album) =

Studio album by Stanley Turrentine
- Released: March/April 1965
- Recorded: January 24, 1964
- Studio: Van Gelder Studio, Englewood Cliffs, NJ
- Genre: Jazz
- Length: 41:06
- Label: Blue Note; BST 84162
- Producer: Alfred Lion

Stanley Turrentine chronology
A Chip Off the Old Block (1963)	Hustlin' (1965)	Blue Flames (1964)

Hustlin' is an album by jazz saxophonist Stanley Turrentine recorded for the Blue Note label and performed by Turrentine with Shirley Scott, Kenny Burrell, Bob Cranshaw, and Otis Finch.

== Critical reception ==
Professional ratings
Review scores
Source	Rating
Allmusic	4/5 stars
The Penguin Guide to Jazz Recordings	3/4 stars

The Allmusic review by Scott Yanow awarded the album 4 stars and states "The Turrentine-Scott team never made an unworthy disc; all are easily recommended, including this one".

== Track listing ==
1. "Trouble (No. 2)" (Harold Logan, Lloyd Price) – 7:48
2. "Love Letters" (Heyman, Young) – 7:38
3. "The Hustler" (Turrentine) – 6:02
4. "Ladyfingers" (Shirley Scott) – 6:21
5. "Something Happens to Me" (Marvin Fisher, Jack Segal) – 6:15
6. "Goin' Home" (Antonín Dvořák, William Arms Fisher) – 7:02

== Personnel ==
- Stanley Turrentine – tenor saxophone
- Shirley Scott – organ
- Kenny Burrell – guitar
- Bob Cranshaw – bass
- Otis Finch – drums

=== Production ===
- Alfred Lion – producer
- Reid Miles – graphic designer
- Rudy Van Gelder – audio engineering
- Francis Wolff – photography
