= Precious Energy =

Live album by Leon Thomas and Gary Bartz
- Released: 1990
- Recorded: March 6 and 7, 1987
- Venue: Ethell's, Baltimore, Maryland
- Genre: Jazz
- Length: 1:07:03
- Label: Mapleshade; 512694A
- Producer: Pierre Sprey

Leon Thomas chronology
Full Circle (1973)	Precious Energy (1990)

Precious Energy is a live album by vocalist Leon Thomas and saxophonist Gary Bartz. It was recorded on March 6 and 7, 1987, at Ethell's in Baltimore, Maryland, and was released in 1990 by Mapleshade Records. Thomas and Bartz are joined by trumpeter Eddie Henderson, pianist Bob Butta, double bassist Geoff Harper, and drummer Steve Johns.

== Reception ==
Professional ratings
Review scores
Source	Rating
AllMusic	4/5 stars
MusicHound Jazz	3.5/5 stars
The Rolling Stone Jazz & Blues Album Guide	3.5/5 stars

In a review for AllMusic, Ron Wynn noted that Thomas and Bartz "made an excellent team," and wrote: "Although he doesn't try the ambitious yodeling and special effects he did with [Pharoah] Sanders, Thomas does demonstrate the creamy sound and full force of earlier years, while Bartz's solos are once more fluid, strong, and expansive."

Mike Joyce of The Washington Post stated that the album is "powerful enough to make you wish you were present" when it was recorded, describing it as an "earthy, raucous and loosely arranged affair." He commented: "Thomas is in a wonderfully gregarious mood, his rich baritone forever changing inflections and directions; he's a spiritual healer, scatman, yodeler, crooner and blues shouter all rolled into one."

== Track listing ==
1. "Precious Energy" (Leon Thomas) – 12:55
2. "You Treat Me Like a Yo-Yo" (Leon Thomas) – 8:15
3. "Sunflowers" (Leon Thomas, Freddie Hubbard) – 11:13
4. "Cousin Mary" (Jon Hendricks, John Coltrane) – 6:58
5. "Woman" (Leon Thomas) – 7:11
6. "Wave" (Antonio Carlos Jobim) – 15:38
7. "Boom, Boom, Boom" (Leon Thomas) – 4:53

== Personnel ==
- Leon Thomas – voice
- Gary Bartz – alto saxophone
- Eddie Henderson – trumpet
- Bob Butta – piano
- Geoff Harper – double bass
- Steve Johns – drums
