= Full Circle (Leon Thomas album) =

Studio album by Leon Thomas
- Released: 1973
- Recorded: 1973
- Studio: RCA Studio A, New York
- Genre: Jazz
- Length: 48:24
- Label: Flying Dutchman; FD 10167
- Producer: Bob Thiele

Leon Thomas chronology
Blues and the Soulful Truth (1973)	Full Circle (1973)	Precious Energy (1990)

Full Circle is an album by American jazz vocalist and percussionist Leon Thomas recorded in 1973 and released by the Flying Dutchman label.

== Reception ==
Professional ratings
Review scores
Source	Rating
AllMusic	2.5/5 stars

AllMusic reviewer Rob Ferrier stated: "this is sure to please fans in search of more. Let the pimped-out picture on the front cover serve as a warning, though. There are not a lot of jazz fireworks here. ... this is a fairly straight-ahead pop and soul offering. The best moments on the record are those that stick to that groove ... On other, more technically demanding tunes, Thomas sounds a little bored, and dare it be said, average".

In a review for All About Jazz, Craig Jolley commented: "Full Circle was conceived as a commercial session. It is not a sell out. The best funk session players of the time were brought in to back Thomas, particularly Richard Davis who gives the music a strong sense of forward momentum. Thomas mostly sings better pop tunes of the time, tunes with energy and personality. He puts his own stamp on them, often lifting them to the next level with his authority."

== Track listing ==
1. "Sweet Little Angel" (B.B. King, Jules Taub) – 4:59
2. "Just in Time to See the Sun" (Carlos Santana) – 2:58
3. "It's My Life I'm Fighting For" (Neal Creque) – 10:10
4. "Never Let Me Go" (Joe Scott) – 2:58
5. "I Wanna Be Where You Are" (Arthur Ross, Leon Ware) – 4:22
6. "Got To Be There" (Elliot Willensky) – 4:27
7. "Balance of Life (Peace of Mind)" (Leon Thomas, Neal Creque) – 7:02
8. "You Are the Sunshine of My Life" (Stevie Wonder) – 5:47
9. "What Are We Gonna Do?" (Leon Thomas) – 5:56

== Personnel ==
- Leon Thomas − vocals, percussion, maracas
- Neal Creque – electric piano, piano (tracks 1, 3–7 & 9)
- Joe Beck – electric guitar, acoustic guitar (tracks 1, 2, 4–6 & 8)
- Lloyd Davis – electric guitar (1–6 & 8)
- Richard Davis – electric bass (tracks 1–8)
- Bernard Purdie (tracks 1, 2, 4, 5 & 7), Herbie Lovelle (tracks 3, 6 & 8) – drums
- Richard Landrum – percussion, bata (tracks 3, 5 & 6)
- Sonny Morgan – percussion, berimbau (tracks 2, 3 & 5–8)
- Jimmy Owens – trumpet, flugelhorn (tracks 2, 5, 6 & 8)
- Pee Wee Ellis – tenor saxophone, soprano saxophone (tracks 2 & 4)
- Glenn Osser – arranger, conductor
