= Full Nelson (album) =

Studio album by Oliver Nelson Orchestra
- Released: End of August 1963
- Recorded: November 19, 1962 (#1, 2, 8, 9); February 26, 1963 (#3, 4, 7, 10); March 28, 1963 (#5, 6, 11, 12)
- Studio: RCA Studios, New York City
- Genre: Jazz
- Length: 41:05
- Label: Verve; V-8508
- Producer: Creed Taylor

Oliver Nelson Orchestra chronology
Impressions of Phaedra (1962)	Full Nelson (1963)	Fantabulous (1964)

Professional ratings
Review scores
Source	Rating
Down Beat	3.5/5 stars
Allmusic	3/5 stars

Full Nelson is a jazz album by Oliver Nelson recorded in 1962 and 1963, and released on Verve Records. It is one of his first big band albums. Nelson has also arranged his Hoe Down, originally based on an Aaron Copland composition, which initially appeared in a septet version on The Blues and the Abstract Truth, in a driving big band arrangement that features Clark Terry.

== Reception ==
Down Beat magazine critic Harvey Pekar wrote that, "Nelson's alto work is featured on Full Nelson, Skokiaan, and Leonard Bernstein's Cool. He plays fluently and melodically with a somewhat harder tone than he has used in the past. Back Woods is a humorous piece, dedicated to Phil Woods and spotlighting his biting alto playing."

== Track listing ==
All tracks composed by Oliver Nelson, unless otherwise noted.

1. "Full Nelson" – 2:47
2. "Skokiaan" (Msarurgwa, Glazer) - 1:54
3. "Miss Fine" - 4:11
4. "Majorca" - 3:06
5. "Cool" (Bernstein, Sondheim) - 4:55
6. "Back Woods" - 3:32
7. "Lila's Theme" (Goldsmith) - 3:55
8. "Ballad for Benny" - 2:36
9. "Hoe Down" - 2:50
10. "Paris Blues" (Ellington) - 2:57
11. "What Kind of Fool Am I?" (Newley, Bricusse) - 3:51
12. "You Love But Once" - 4:31

== Personnel ==
- Oliver Nelson - arranger, conductor, alto saxophone, tenor saxophone
- George Duvivier (1, 2, 8, 9), Milt Hinton (all others) - bass
- Phil Kraus - celesta, vibraphone (5, 6, 11, 12)
- Ed Shaughnessy (1, 2, 8, 9), Osie Johnson (all others) - drums
- Ray Alonge (1, 2, 8, 9), Bob Northern (1, 2, 8, 9) - French horn
- Jimmy Raney (1, 2, 8, 9), Jim Hall (all others) - guitar
- Harry Brewer - marimba, Castanets (3, 4, 7, 10)
- Al Cohn, Danny Bank, George Dorsey, Jerome Richardson, Gerry Dodgian [sic] (1, 2, 8, 9), Phil Bodner (5, 6, 11, 12), Phil Woods, Romeo Penque (3, 4, 7, 10), Stan Webb - reeds
- Paul Faulise, Willie Dennis, Rod Levitt (1, 2, 8, 9), Quentin Jackson, Urbie Green, Tony Stud (1, 2, 5, 6, 8, 9, 11, 12), Jimmy Cleveland (1, 2, 5, 6, 7, 8, 11, 12) - trombone
- Clark Terry - trumpet, flugelhorn (1, 2, 3, 8, 9)
- Bernie Glow, Ernie Royal, Snooky Young, Jimmy Maxwell (1, 2, 8, 9), Joe Newman - trumpet
