= Blue Flames =

Studio album by Shirley Scott and Stanley Turrentine
- Released: 1964
- Recorded: March 31, 1964
- Studios: Van Gelder Studio, Englewood Cliffs
- Genre: Jazz
- Length: 33:04
- Labels: Prestige; PR 7338
- Producer: Ozzie Cadena

Shirley Scott chronology
Now's the Time (1958-64)	Blue Flames (1964)	Great Scott!! (1964)

Stanley Turrentine chronology
Hustlin' (1964)	Blue Flames (1964)	In Memory Of (1964)

Professional ratings
Review scores
Source	Rating
Allmusic	4/5 stars
The Penguin Guide to Jazz Recordings	3/4 stars

Blue Flames is a collaboration album by organist Shirley Scott and saxophonist Stanley Turrentine recorded in 1964 and released on the Prestige label.

== Reception ==
Scott Yanow awarded the album 4 stars stating "All of the many collaborations between organist Shirley Scott and tenor saxophonist Stanley Turrentine in the 1960s resulted in high-quality soul jazz, groovin' music that was boppish enough to interest jazz listeners and basic enough for a wider audience".

== Track listing ==
1. "The Funky Fox" (Shirley Scott) – 5:33
2. "Hips Knees an' Legs" (Scott) – 5:35
3. "Five Spot After Dark" (Benny Golson) – 5:27
4. "Grand Street" (Sonny Rollins) – 7:20
5. "Flamingo" (Edmund Anderson, Ted Grouya) – 9:09

== Personnel ==
- Shirley Scott – organ
- Stanley Turrentine – tenor saxophone
- Bob Cranshaw – bass
- Otis Finch – drums
