= The Blues and the Abstract Truth, Take 2 =

Studio album by Bill Cunliffe
- Released: 2008
- Genre: Progressive jazz Post-bop; Hard bop
- Length: 48:37
- Label: Resonance Records
- Producer: George Klabin

Professional ratings
Review scores
Source	Rating
All About Jazz	(no rating)
Buffalo News	4/5 stars

The Blues and The Abstract Truth, Take 2 is a 2008 album, released on the Resonance label, by American jazz pianist Bill Cunliffe. It is a tribute to Oliver Nelson, particularly to his 1961 album The Blues and the Abstract Truth.

== Track listing ==
1. "Stolen Moments"
2. "Hoe Down"
3. "Cascades"
4. "Yearnin'"
5. "Butch and Butch"
6. "Teenie's Blues"
7. "Port Authority"
8. "Mary Lou's Blues"

(1-6: Oliver Nelson; 7&8: Bill Cunliffe)

== Performers ==
- Bill Cunliffe - piano and arranger
- Terell Stafford - guest soloist: trumpet
- Jeff Clayton - guest soloist: alto sax
- Andy Martin - trombone
- Bob Sheppard - tenor sax and soprano sax
- Brian Scanlon - alto sax
- Larry Lunetta - trumpet
- Tom Warrington - bass
- Mark Ferber - drums
