= Hoochie Cooche Man =

Studio album by Jimmy Smith
- Released: September 1966
- Recorded: June 14, 1966
- Studio: Van Gelder Studio, Englewood Cliffs
- Genre: Jazz
- Length: 34:05
- Label: Verve V6-8667
- Producer: Creed Taylor

Jimmy Smith chronology
La Métamorphose des cloportes (1966)	Hoochie Cooche Man (1966)	Peter & the Wolf (1966)

Singles from Hoochie Cooche Man
- 1. "I'm Your Hoochie Cooche Man, Part. 1" Released: July 1966

Hoochie Cooche Man is a 1966 album by Jimmy Smith arranged by Oliver Nelson. The album title has also been spelled as Hoochie Coochie Man.

== Reception ==
Professional ratings
Review scores
Source	Rating
Allmusic	4/5 stars

Billboard reviewed the album in their September 3, 1966 issue and wrote that "Only six cuts on the LP, but they're all blockbusters, blues based rousers...".

== Track listing ==
1. "I'm Your Hoochie Coochie Man" (Willie Dixon) – 6:00
2. "One Mint Julep" (Rudy Toombs) – 5:30
3. "Ain't That Just Like a Woman" (Claude Demetrius, Fleecie Moore) – 5:40
4. "Boom Boom" (John Lee Hooker) – 6:12
5. "Blues and the Abstract Truth" (Oliver Nelson) – 5:25
6. "TNT" (Ben Tucker, Grady Tate) – 5:25

== Personnel ==
=== Musicians ===
- Jimmy Smith – Hammond organ, vocals
- Oliver Nelson – arranger, conductor
- Richard Davis – double bass
- Bob Cranshaw – electric bass
- Bobby Rosengarden – bongos, percussion
- Grady Tate – drums
- Donald Corrado, Willie Ruff – French horn
- Barry Galbraith, Bill Suyker, Billy Butler, Kenny Burrell – guitar
- Buddy Lucas – harmonica
- Jack Agee, Jerome Richardson, Jerry Dodgion, Phil Woods, Bob Ashton – woodwind
- Britt Woodman, Melba Liston, Quentin Jackson, Tom McIntosh – trombone
- Ernie Royal, Gene Young, Joe Newman, Dick Williams – trumpet
- Don Butterfield – tuba

=== Technical ===
- Creed Taylor – producer
- Val Valentin – director of engineering
- Rudy Van Gelder – engineer
- Acy R. Lehman – cover design
- Chuck Stewart – photography

== Chart performance ==
=== Album ===
Chart (1966)	Peak position	Total weeks
U.S. Billboard 200	77	14

=== Single ===
Year	Single	Chart	Position
1966	"I'm Your Hoochie Coochie Man (Part I)"	Billboard Hot 100	94
