= In Memory Of (Stanley Turrentine album) =

Studio album by Stanley Turrentine
- Released: 1979
- Recorded: June 3, 1964
- Genre: Jazz
- Label: Blue Note
- Producer: Alfred Lion

Stanley Turrentine chronology
Blue Flames (1964)	In Memory Of (1979)	Mr. Natural (1964)

In Memory Of is an album by jazz saxophonist Stanley Turrentine, recorded for the Blue Note label in 1964 but not released until 1979, and performed by Turrentine with Blue Mitchell, Curtis Fuller, Herbie Hancock, Bob Cranshaw, and Otis Finch.

== Reception ==
Professional ratings
Review scores
Source	Rating
Allmusic	4.5/5 stars
The Rolling Stone Jazz Record Guide	3/5 stars

The Allmusic review by Michael Erlewine awarded the album 4½ stars.

== Track listing ==
1. "Fried Pies (Wes Montgomery) - 10:25
2. "In Memory Of" (Randy Weston) - 6:58
3. "Niger Mambo" (Bobby Benson) - 3:21
4. "Make Someone Happy" (Jule Styne, Betty Comden, Adolph Green) - 6:20
5. "Jodie's Cha Cha" (Bill Lee) - 6:14
6. "Sunday in New York" (Carroll Coates, Peter Nero) - 6:44

- Recorded at the Van Gelder Studio, Englewood Cliffs, NJ on June 3, 1964.

== Personnel ==
- Stanley Turrentine - tenor saxophone
- Blue Mitchell - trumpet
- Curtis Fuller - trombone
- Herbie Hancock - piano
- Bob Cranshaw - bass
- Otis Finch - drums
- Mickey Roker - congas (1,2)

=== Production ===
- Alfred Lion - producer
- Rudy Van Gelder - engineer
