= Let It Go (Stanley Turrentine album) =

Studio album by Stanley Turrentine
- Released: February 1967
- Recorded: April 6, 1966 (#1–2, 5, 7); April 15, 1966 (#3–4, 6); September 21, 1964 (#8–11)
- Studio: Van Gelder Studio, Englewood Cliffs, NJ
- Genre: Jazz
- Length: 39:14 original LP
- Label: Impulse! A-9115
- Producer: Bob Thiele

Stanley Turrentine chronology
Joyride (1965)	Let It Go (1967)	Rough 'n' Tumble (1966)

Let It Go is an album by jazz saxophonist Stanley Turrentine recorded for Blue Note Records label in 1966 and released on Impuse! Records in 1967. The album features rhythm section Shirley Scott, Ron Carter and Mack Simpkins.

== Release history ==
The CD release added four bonus tracks, three of which originally released on Scott's Everybody Loves a Lover recorded in 1964 and featuring Bob Cranshaw and Otis Finch in place of Carter and Simpkins.

== Reception ==
Professional ratings
Review scores
Source	Rating
Allmusic	4/5 stars

The AllMusic review by Stephen Cook awarded the album 4 stars and states "For fans ready to graduate from Stanley Turrentine's many fine Blue Note sets, this excellent mid-'60s date on Impulse should be the perfect option".

== Track listing ==
All compositions by Stanley Turrentine except as noted

1. "Let It Go" – 5:55
2. "On a Clear Day You Can See Forever" (Burton Lane, Alan Jay Lerner) – 6:58
3. "Ciao, Ciao" – 5:54
4. "T'ain't What You Do (It's the Way That You Do It)" (Sy Oliver, Trummy Young) – 5:31
5. "Good Lookin' Out" – 5:23
6. "Sure as You're Born" (Alan Bergman, Johnny Mandel) – 4:44
7. "Deep Purple" (Peter DeRose, Mitchell Parish) – 4:49

=== Bonus tracks on CD reissue in 1991: ===
8. "Time After Time" (Sammy Cahn, Jule Styne) – 9:20
9. "Sent for You Yesterday (And Here You Come Today)" (Count Basie, Eddie Durham, Jimmy Rushing) – 5:42
10. "The Lamp Is Low" (DeRose, Parish, Maurice Ravel, Bert Shefter) – 8:07
11. "The Feeling of Jazz" (Duke Ellington, George T. Simon, Bobby Troup) – 3:56

== Personnel ==
- Stanley Turrentine – tenor saxophone
- Shirley Scott – organ
- Ron Carter – bass (tracks 1–7)
- Mack Simpkins – drums (tracks 1–7)
- Bob Cranshaw – bass (tracks 8–11)
- Otis Finch – drums (tracks 8–11)

=== Production ===
- Bob Thiele – producer
- Rudy Van Gelder – engineer
