= Jimmy & Wes: The Dynamic Duo =

Studio album by Jimmy Smith, Wes Montgomery
- Released: 1966
- Recorded: September 21, 23 & 28, 1966
- Studio: Van Gelder Studio, Englewood Cliffs, N.J.
- Genre: Jazz
- Length: 41:46
- Label: Verve
- Producer: Creed Taylor

Wes Montgomery chronology
California Dreaming (1966)	Jimmy & Wes: The Dynamic Duo (1966)	Further Adventures of Jimmy and Wes (1966)

Jimmy Smith chronology
Peter & the Wolf (1966)	Jimmy & Wes: The Dynamic Duo (1966)	Further Adventures of Jimmy and Wes (1966)

Jimmy & Wes: The Dynamic Duo is a 1966 collaborative album by American jazz guitarist Wes Montgomery and electric organist Jimmy Smith, with arrangements by Oliver Nelson. It is frequently listed among Jimmy Smith's best albums. The duo's follow-up record, Further Adventures of Jimmy and Wes, was recorded during the same sessions and released in 1968.

== Reception ==
Professional ratings
Review scores
Source	Rating
AllMusic	5/5 stars
The Penguin Guide to Jazz	3.5/4 stars

Richard S. Ginell reviewed the album for AllMusic and was highly favorable in his comments, writing:

"... the results are incendiary—a near-ideal meeting of yin and yang. Smith comes at your throat with his big attacks and blues runs while Montgomery responds with rounder, smoother octaves and single notes that still convey much heat. They are an amazing pair, complementing each other, driving each other, using their bop and blues taproots to fuse together a sound."

== Track listing ==
Side One

1. "Down by the Riverside" (Traditional) – 10:02
2. "Night Train" (Jimmy Forrest) – 6:46

Side Two

3. "James and Wes" (Jimmy Smith) – 8:13
4. "13 (Death March)" (Gary McFarland) – 5:22
5. "Baby, It's Cold Outside" (Frank Loesser) – 6:05

1997 CD reissue bonus track

6. "O.G.D. (aka Road Song)" (Wes Montgomery) - Alternate Take – 5:13

== Personnel ==
=== Musicians ===
- Jimmy Smith – Hammond organ
- Wes Montgomery – guitar
- Grady Tate – drums
- Ray Barretto – conga (tracks 3–6)
  - Tracks 1, 2, 4 add:
- Bob Ashton, Danny Bank, Jerry Dodgion, Jerome Richardson, Phil Woods – reeds
- Clark Terry – trumpet, flugelhorn
- Ernie Royal, Jimmy Maxwell, Joe Newman – trumpet
- Jimmy Cleveland, Melba Liston, Quentin Jackson – trombone
- Tony Studd – bass trombone (tracks 1–2)
- Dick Hixson – bass trombone (track 4)
- Richard Davis – bass
- Oliver Nelson – arranger, conductor

=== Production ===
- Creed Taylor – producer
- Val Valentin – director of engineering
- Rudy Van Gelder – engineer
- Acy R. Lehman – cover design
- Chuck Stewart – photography

== Chart performance ==
=== Album ===
Chart (1967)	Peak position	Total weeks
U.S. Billboard 200	129	23
