= Respect (Jimmy Smith album) =

Studio album by Jimmy Smith
- Released: 1967
- Recorded: June 2 & 14, 1967
- Studio: Van Gelder Studio, Englewood Cliffs, New Jersey
- Genre: Jazz
- Length: 31:26
- Label: Verve; V-8705
- Producer: Creed Taylor

Jimmy Smith chronology
| Further Adventures of Jimmy and Wes (1967) | Respect (1967) | The Boss (1968) |

Singles from Respect
- 1. "Respect" Released: July 1967

Respect is a 1967 album by the American jazz organist Jimmy Smith.

On the Billboard albums chart, Respect peaked at number 60 on the Billboard 200, at 3 on the top R&B albums chart and at 5 on the top Jazz albums chart.

== Reception ==
Professional ratings
Review scores
| Source | Rating |
|---|---|
| AllMusic | 2/5 stars |

Billboard magazine chose Respect as one of their 'Jazz Spotlight' albums for their 30 September 1967 issue and commented that:

"It's Smith at his best - and that means sales in the register".

AllMusic's review by Scott Yanow stated that Smith:

"...mostly sticks to then-current R&B hits on this out of print LP. He does what he can with "Mercy, Mercy, Mercy," a brief "Respect" and "Funky Broadway" while contributing his own blues "T-Bone Steak." The 31-minute set has its moments but no real surprises, yet it swings funkily throughout."

== Track listing ==
1. "Mercy, Mercy, Mercy" (Joe Zawinul) – 6:30
2. "Respect" (Otis Redding) – 2:12
3. "Funky Broadway" (Arlester "Dyke" Christian) – 6:39
4. "T-Bone Steak" (Jimmy Smith) – 7:24
5. "Get Out of My Life Woman" (Allen Toussaint) – 8:50

== Personnel ==
=== Musicians ===
- Jimmy Smith – organ
- Eric Gale – guitar
- Thornel Schwartz – guitar
- Bob Bushnell – double bass
- Ron Carter – double bass
- Bernard "Pretty" Purdie – drums
- Grady Tate – drums

=== Technical ===
- Creed Taylor – producer
- Rudy Van Gelder – engineer
- Val Valentin – director of engineering
- Jack Anesh – cover design
- Irv Elkin – cover photography
- A. B. Spellman – liner notes

== Chart performance ==
=== Album ===
| Chart (1967) | Peak position | Total weeks |
|---|---|---|
| U.S. Billboard 200 | 60 | 20 |
