= Disney Songs the Satchmo Way =

Studio album by Louis Armstrong
- Released: 1968
- Recorded: May 1968
- Studio: Sunset Sound (Hollywood, California)
- Genre: Jazz, vocal Jazz
- Length: 31:18
- Label: Buena Vista Records STER-4044
- Producer: Tutti Camarata

Louis Armstrong chronology
What a Wonderful World (1968)	Disney Songs the Satchmo Way (1968)	Louis Armstrong and His Friends (1970)

Disney Songs the Satchmo Way is a 1968 album of music from Disney films by the trumpeter and singer Louis Armstrong and produced by Tutti Camarata.

The album was recorded in Los Angeles at the same time that Armstrong filmed his brief appearance in the film Hello, Dolly!. Disney Songs the Satchmo Way featured Armstrong's last trumpet recordings. Armstrong had been personally asked by Walt Disney to make the album in 1966, although it was not completed until after Disney's death. The Disney music executive Jimmy Johnson recalled that "The dates with Louis were among the happiest I can remember. He had been quite ill but had gone on a rigorous diet. He was very thin but looked well and was full of energy". Armstrong later wrote to Camarata to say that "This goldarned "Wish Upon a Star" is so beautiful and more than that, man – I listen to that tune three or four times a night. Man, did you know I'm a doggoned long-time wishing cat? Well, I am man...I haven't enjoyed anything better than our recording sessions since – well I can't remember when".

== Reception ==
Professional ratings
Review scores
Source	Rating
Allmusic	3/5 stars

Scott Yanow reviewed the reissue of the album for Allmusic and wrote that these "One may not expect much from such songs as "Zip-A-Dee-Doo-Dah," "Whistle While You Work," and "The Ballad of Davy Crockett," but Armstrong's joyful vocals and occasional emotional trumpet really uplift the material. His rendition of "When You Wish Upon a Star" is touching, and few of the songs (including "The Bare Necessities" and "Heigh-Ho") have never sounded livelier and more fun".

== Track listing ==
1. "Zip-a-Dee-Doo-Dah" (Ray Gilbert, Allie Wrubel) – 2:22
2. "Ten Feet off the Ground" (Richard M. Sherman, Robert B. Sherman) – 2:46
3. "Heigh-Ho" (Frank Churchill, Larry Morey) – 2:37
4. "Whistle While You Work" (Churchill, Morey) – 1:56
5. "Chim Chim Cher-ee" (R. M. Sherman, R. B. Sherman) – 6:40
6. "Bibbidi-Bobbidi-Boo" (Mack David, Al Hoffman, Jerry Livingston) – 2:08
7. "'Bout Time" (R. M. Sherman, R. B. Sherman) – 2:53
8. "The Ballad of Davy Crockett" (Tom Blackburn, George Bruns) – 3:15
9. "The Bare Necessities" (Terry Gilkyson) – 2:26
10. "When You Wish upon a Star" (Leigh Harline, Ned Washington) – 4:25

== Personnel ==
- Louis Armstrong – trumpet, vocals
- Maxwell Davies – arranger
- Jordan Foley – design
- Bill Lazerus – engineer
- Terence Blanchard, André Mika, Al Hirt, Leroy Jones – reissue liner notes
- Tutti Camarata – producer
