= Another Opus =

Studio album by Lem Winchester
- Released: 1960
- Recorded: June 4, 1960
- Studio: Van Gelder Studio, Englewood Cliffs, New Jersey
- Genre: Jazz
- Length: 34:22
- Label: New Jazz; NJLP 8244
- Producer: Esmond Edwards

Lem Winchester chronology
Lem's Beat (1960)	Another Opus (1960)	Lem Winchester with Feeling (1961)

Another Opus is an album by vibraphonist Lem Winchester which was recorded in 1960 and released on the New Jazz label.

== Reception ==
Professional ratings
Review scores
Source	Rating
AllMusic	4.5/5 stars
The Penguin Guide to Jazz Recordings	2.5/4 stars

AllMusic reviewer Scott Yanow described it as "one of Lem Winchester's definitive sets".

== Track listing ==
All compositions by Lem Winchester except where noted.

1. "Another Opus" – 6:31
2. "Blues Prayer" – 10:37
3. "The Meetin'" (Oliver Nelson) – 5:48
4. "Like Someone in Love" (Jimmy Van Heusen, Johnny Burke) – 6:30
5. "Both Barrels" – 4:56

== Personnel ==
- Lem Winchester – vibraphone
- Frank Wess – flute
- Hank Jones – piano
- Eddie Jones – bass
- Gus Johnson – drums
