= Mr. Natural (Stanley Turrentine album) =

Studio album by Stanley Turrentine
- Released: 1980
- Recorded: September 4, 1964
- Studio: Van Gelder Studio, Englewood Cliffs
- Genre: Jazz
- Length: 39:41
- Label: Blue Note; LT 1075
- Producer: Alfred Lion

Stanley Turrentine chronology
In Memory Of (1964)	Mr. Natural (1980)	Joyride (1965)

Alternative cover
- 1980 Japanese LP (GXK 8176)

Mr. Natural is the twelfth album by jazz saxophonist Stanley Turrentine, recorded for the Blue Note label in 1964 but not released until 1980 as LT 1075, and performed by Turrentine with Lee Morgan, McCoy Tyner, Bob Cranshaw, Elvin Jones and Ray Barretto.

== Reception ==
Professional ratings
Review scores
Source	Rating
AllMusic	3/5 stars
The Rolling Stone Jazz Record Guide	3/5 stars

The AllMusic review by Ken Dryden stated: "Although long out of print and an unlikely candidate to be reissued on CD, this rewarding session is well worth seeking, even if Blue Note founder Alfred Lion had second thoughts about it and set it aside".

== Track listing ==
1. "Wahoo" [aka "Stanley's Blues"] (Duke Pearson) - 9:02
2. "Shirley" (Stanley Turrentine) - 10:46
3. "Tacos" (Lee Morgan) - 6:32
4. "My Girl Is Just Enough Woman For Me" (Dorothy Fields, Albert Hague) - 6:33
5. "Can't Buy Me Love" (John Lennon, Paul McCartney) - 6:48

== Personnel ==
- Stanley Turrentine - tenor saxophone
- Lee Morgan - trumpet (1–3 & 5)
- McCoy Tyner - piano
- Bob Cranshaw - bass
- Elvin Jones - drums
- Ray Barretto - conga (1–3)

=== Production ===
- Alfred Lion - producer
- Rudy Van Gelder - engineer

== Charts ==
2023 chart performance for Mr. Natural
Chart (2023)	Peak position
German Albums (Offizielle Top 100)	72
