= Louis 'Country & Western' Armstrong =

Studio album by Louis Armstrong
- Released: October 1970
- Recorded: Nola Studios, West 57th Street, Manhattan, New York City
- Label: Avco Embassy Records 80 959 IT

Louis Armstrong chronology
Louis Armstrong and His Friends (1970)	Louis 'Country & Western' Armstrong (1970)

Louis 'Country & Western' Armstrong is a 1970 album by the trumpeter and singer Louis Armstrong of country and western music standards. It was Armstrong's last album of recorded music.

Armstrong's vocals were dubbed over the pre-recorded instrumental backing. Armstrong's contributions were recorded in New York due to his health issues, with the remainder being recorded in Nashville, Tennessee. Armstrong appeared on The Johnny Cash Show to promote the album in October 1970, the month of its release.

== Reception ==
Professional ratings
Review scores
Source	Rating
Allmusic	1.5/5 stars

Eugene Chadbourne reviewed the reissue of the album for Allmusic and wrote that "Fans of Armstrong's singing, in fact, will probably hate this record even more than fans of his trumpet playing...With the understanding that he was one of the great musical geniuses of the 20th century, it nonetheless must be stated firmly that in the final judgment, delivered by someone attempting to sit through this record, no rating system of any kind can really describe just what a total piece of crap it is". The decision to have Armstrong record his vocals separately from the instrumental backing led Chadbourne to describe the music as "just rhythm run-throughs, with Armstrong singing, mumbling, and commenting over the top; the instrumental parts are devoid of any flair or commitment whatsoever" and that the "resulting lack of any sort of sympathy or communication between Armstrong and the accompanying musicians is simply a total death blow".

== Track listing ==
1. "Miller's Cave" (Jack Clement) – 3:47
2. "Almost Persuaded" (Billy Sherrill, Glenn Sutton) – 4:18
3. "Running Bear" (J.P. Richardson) – 3:16
4. "Get Together" (Chet Powers) – 3:40
5. "Crystal Chandeliers" (Ted Harris) – 2:37
6. "You Can Have Her" (Bill Cook) – 4:00
7. "The Easy Part's Over" (Bill Rice, Jerry Foster) – 2:24
8. "Black Cloud" (Bill Brock) – 2:00
9. "Why Did Mrs. Murphy Leave Town" (Clement) – 2:51
10. "Wolverton Mountain" (Claude King, Merle Kilgore) – 3:15
11. "Ramblin' Rose" (Joe Sherman, Noel Sherman) – 2:35
12. "Crazy Arms" (Charles Sales, Ralph Mooney) – 2:29

== Personnel ==
- Louis Armstrong – vocals
- Jack Eubanks – guitar
- Stu Basore – steel guitar
- Billie Grammer – rhythm guitar
- Larry Butler – piano
- Henry Strzelecki – double bass
- Willie Ackerman – drums
