= 3 Shades of Blue =

Studio album by Johnny Hodges with Leon Thomas and Oliver Nelson
- Released: 1970
- Recorded: March 17 & 19, 1970
- Studio: New York City
- Genre: Jazz
- Label: Flying Dutchman FDS 120
- Producer: Bob Thiele

Johnny Hodges chronology
Rippin' & Runnin' (1968)	3 Shades of Blue (1970)

Oliver Nelson chronology
Black, Brown and Beautiful (1969)	3 Shades of Blue (1970)	Zig Zag (1970)

3 Shades of Blue is the final album recorded as leader by American jazz saxophonist Johnny Hodges featuring performances recorded in 1970 with vocalist Leon Thomas and composer/arranger Oliver Nelson and first released on the Flying Dutchman label. The album was rereleased in 1989 under Nelson's leadership as Black, Brown and Beautiful with additional tracks.

== Reception ==
Professional ratings
Review scores
Source	Rating
Allmusic	3/5 stars
DownBeat	4/5 stars

The Allmusic site awarded the album 3 stars. Dan Morgenstern awarded the album 4 stars in a contemporary review for DownBeat, praising it as a worthy addition to Hodges' body of work which cemented his impressive legacy.

== Track listing ==
1. "Empty Ballroom Blues" (Duke Ellington, Cootie Williams) – 4:54
2. "Duke's Place" (Ellington, Bob Thiele, Bill Katz, Ruth Roberts) – 2:35
3. "Echoes of Harlem" (Ellington) – 4:20
4. "Disillusion Blues" (Leon Thomas) – 3:56
5. "Yearning" (Oliver Nelson) – 5:20
6. "Welcome to New York" (Thomas) – 4:10
7. "Black, Brown and Beautiful" (Nelson) – 3:50
8. "Rockin' in Rhythm (Ellington, Harry Carney, Irving Mills) – 3:09
9. "Creole Love Call" (Ellington) – 4:56
10. "It´s Glory" (Ellington) – 2:55

== Personnel ==
- Johnny Hodges – alto saxophone
- Leon Thomas – vocals (tracks 2, 4 & 6)
- Oliver Nelson – arranger, conductor
- Randy Brecker, Ernie Royal, Marvin Stamm, Snooky Young – trumpet
- Al Grey, Quentin Jackson, Garnett Brown, Thomas Mitchell – trombone
- Bob Ashton, Danny Bank, Jerry Dodgion, Joe Farrell, Jerome Richardson, Frank Wess – reeds
- Earl Hines (tracks 2, 4, 6, 8 & 10), Hank Jones (tracks 1, 3, 5, 7 & 9) – piano
- David Spinozza – guitar (tracks 2, 4, 6, 8 & 10)
- Ron Carter – bass
- Grady Tate – drums
