= Zig Zag (1970 film) =

1970 film by Richard A. Colla

- Directed by: Richard A. Colla
- Screenplay by: John T. Kelley
- Story by: Robert Enders
- Produced by: Robert Enders; Everett Freeman
- Starring: George Kennedy; Anne Jackson; Eli Wallach; Steve Ihnat; William Marshall
- Cinematography: James Crabe
- Edited by: Ferris Webster
- Music by: Oliver Nelson
- Distributed by: Metro-Goldwyn-Mayer
- Release date: April 27, 1970
- Running time: 105 minutes
- Country: United States
- Language: English
- Budget: $1.7 million

Zig Zag, also released as False Witness, is a 1970 American thriller drama film directed by Richard A. Colla and starring George Kennedy. The film was remade in India as Majboor (1974).

== Plot ==
Paul Cameron is an insurance executive who finds out he has a brain tumor. His family will receive nothing under his current policies, but there is a huge reward for information leading to the arrest of the murderer of a businessman. Cameron frames himself for the murder in the hope of collecting the reward money for his wife in an anonymous bank account. Cameron is found guilty and sentenced to death, but then is cured of the disease, and escapes in order to find the real killer and clear his name.

== Cast ==
- George Kennedy as Paul Cameron
- Anne Jackson as Jean Cameron
- Eli Wallach as Mario Gambretti
- Steve Ihnat as Herb Gates
- William Marshall as Morris Bronson
- Joe Maross as Lieutenant Hines
- Dana Elcar as Harold Tracey
- Walter Brooke as Adam Mercer
- Anita O'Day as Sheila Mangan
- Robert Patten as John Raymond

== Soundtrack ==
Zig Zag

Soundtrack album by Oliver Nelson
- Released: 1970
- Recorded: February 19 & 20 and April 3 & 16, 1970
- Studio: MGM Studios Scoring Stage, Culver City and Hollywood, California
- Genre: Film score
- Label: MGM Records; 1SE-21ST
- Producer: Perry Botkin Jr., Don Peake, Mike Curb

Oliver Nelson chronology
3 Shades of Blue (1970)	Zig Zag (1970)	Berlin Dialogue for Orchestra (1970)

Professional ratings
Review scores
Source	Rating
AllMusic	4/5 stars

The film score was composed, arranged and conducted by Oliver Nelson, and the soundtrack album was released on the MGM label. AllMusic's Jason Ankeney noted that Nelson did "a particularly strong job of evoking the grittiness of their urban setting" and said that "Recalling vintage jazz in both its atmosphere and vigor, the music navigates though [sic] a series of mood and tempo shifts with the precision of a race car moving in and out of traffic". The album also included two tracks with lyrics by Hal David sung by Bobby Hatfield and Roy Orbison singing the Mike Curb composition "Zigzag".

=== Track listing ===
All compositions by Oliver Nelson except as indicated

1. "All You Did Was Smile" (lyrics by Hal David) – 1:41
2. "Main Title from "Zigzag" – 2:30
3. "Guilty, Your Honor" – 1:50
4. "It Was You, It Was You" – 2:30
5. "Love Theme (Bossa)" – 2:39
6. "Earphones" – 2:03
7. "Zigzag" (Mike Curb, Robert Enders, Guy Hemric) – 2:50
8. "The Other Car" – 3:55
9. "Variations of Themes" – 4:50
10. "I Call Your Name"(lyrics by Hal David) – 2:32
11. "End Title" – 1:05

=== Personnel ===
Orchestra arranged and conducted by Oliver Nelson except:

Tracks 1 & 10:

- Arranged and conducted by Don Peak with Bobby Hatfield – vocals

Track 7:

- Arranged and conducted by Don Peak with Roy Orbison – vocals

Track 9:

- Buddy Collette – tenor saxophone
- Artie Kane – piano
- Joe Mondragon – bass
- John Guerin, Victor Feldman – drums

== Remakes ==
The film has been remade in India four times:

- the Hindi film Majboor (1974)
- the Telugu film Raja (1976)
- the Tamil film Naan Vazhavaippen (1979)
- the Gujarati film Naseeb No Khel (1982)
