= Impressions of Phaedra =

Studio album by The Oliver Nelson Orchestra
- Released: 1962
- Recorded: 1962; New York City
- Genre: Jazz
- Length: 24:10
- Label: United Artists Jazz; UAJ 14019/UAJS 15019
- Producer: Alan Douglas

Oliver Nelson chronology
Afro/American Sketches (1961)	Impressions of Phaedra (1962)	Full Nelson (1962-63)

Impressions of Phaedra is an album by saxophonist/composer/arranger Oliver Nelson recorded in 1962 and released on the United Artists Jazz label. The album features Nelson's arrangements of Mikis Theodorakis music from the 1962 motion picture Phaedra.

== Reception ==
Professional ratings
Review scores
Source	Rating
Allmusic	2/5 stars

The Allmusic site awarded the album 2 stars, stating: "Moody and long-forgotten, like the film it was inspired by, Phaedra interchanges film-like cues with some torrid jazz content (mostly courtesy of Phil Woods). Makes an interesting case for 'Greek Jazz.'"

== Track listing ==
All compositions by Mikis Theodorakis except as indicated

1. "Phaedra (Love Theme)" - 3:40
2. "London's Fog" - 2:00
3. "Dirge" (Oliver Nelson) - 4:50
4. "Phaedra (Tragedy)" - 2:20
5. "The Fling" - 2:45
6. "Rendezvous" - 2:55
7. "Too Much Sun" - 2:18
8. "One More Time" - 3:22

== Personnel ==
- Oliver Nelson - arranger, conductor
- Clark Terry, Bernie Glow, Doc Severinsen, Snooky Young - trumpet
- Urbie Green, Paul Faulise, Britt Woodman, Tommy Mitchell - trombone
- Don Butterfield - tuba
- Phil Woods - alto saxophone
- Barry Galbraith - guitar
- Lloyd G. Mayers - piano
- George Duvivier - bass
- Ed Shaughnessy - drums
- Ray Barretto - bongos
- Unidentified string section
