= Lem's Beat =

Studio album by Lem Winchester Sextet featuring Oliver Nelson
- Released: 1960
- Recorded: April 19, 1960
- Studio: Van Gelder Studio, Englewood Cliffs, New Jersey
- Genre: Jazz
- Length: 38:41
- Label: New Jazz; NJLP 8239
- Producer: Esmond Edwards

Lem Winchester chronology
Winchester Special (1959)	Lem's Beat (1960)	Another Opus (1960)

Oliver Nelson chronology
Taking Care of Business (1960)	Lem's Beat (1960)	Screamin' the Blues (1960)

Lem's Beat is an album by vibraphonist Lem Winchester's Sextet with saxophonist Oliver Nelson recorded in 1960 and released on the New Jazz label.

== Reception ==
Professional ratings
Review scores
Source	Rating
Allmusic	4/5 stars
The Penguin Guide to Jazz Recordings	2/4 stars

Scott Yanow of Allmusic states: "Nelson emerges as the most distinctive solo voice, and since he contributed three of the six songs, the tenorman's musical personality dominates this set. Winchester shows much potential that, due to his untimely death in early 1961, was never fulfilled. Good bop-based music".

== Track listing ==
All compositions by Oliver Nelson except where noted

1. "Eddy's Dilemma" – 11:37
2. "Lem & Aide" – 7:58
3. "Friendly Persuasion" (Dimitri Tiomkin, Paul Francis Webster) – 4:08
4. "Your Last Chance" – 6:50
5. "Lady Day" (Roy Johnson) – 2:51
6. "Just Friends" (John Klenner, Sam M. Lewis) – 5:17

== Personnel ==
- Lem Winchester – vibraphone
- Oliver Nelson – tenor saxophone, arranger
- Curtis Peagler – alto saxophone
- Billy Brown (tracks 1 & 4), Roy Johnson (tracks 2, 3, 5 & 6) – piano
- Wendell Marshall – bass
- Art Taylor – drums
