= Screamin' the Blues =

Studio album by Oliver Nelson
- Released: January 1961
- Recorded: May 27, 1960
- Studios: Van Gelder Studio, Englewood Cliffs, NJ
- Genre: Jazz blues
- Length: 39:59
- Labels: New Jazz; NJ 8243
- Producer: Esmond Edwards

Oliver Nelson chronology
Lem's Beat (1960)	Screamin' the Blues (1961)	Nocturne (1961)

Screamin' the Blues is an album by the American saxophonist Oliver Nelson, originally released in 1961 on New Jazz Records.

== Reception ==
Leonard Feather gave the album 4 stars in his DownBeat review. Feather called the album Neslon's best record to date.

Professional ratings
Review scores
Source	Rating
AllMusic	4.5/5 stars
The Penguin Guide to Jazz Recordings	3.5/4 stars
DownBeat	4/5 stars

== Track listing ==
All tracks are written by Oliver Nelson, except where noted.

Side one
No.	Title	Length
1.	"Screamin' the Blues"	11:00
2.	"March On, March On" (Esmond Edwards)	4:59
3.	"The Drive"	5:50

Side two
No.	Title	Length
4.	"The Meetin'"	6:44
5.	"Three Seconds"	6:26
6.	"Alto-Itis"	5:00

== Personnel ==
- Oliver Nelson – tenor saxophone, alto saxophone
- Eric Dolphy – bass clarinet, alto saxophone
- Richard Williams – trumpet
- Richard Wyands – piano
- George Duvivier – bass
- Roy Haynes – drums
