= Leon Thomas in Berlin =

Live album by Leon Thomas with Oliver Nelson
- Released: 1971
- Recorded: November 6, 1970
- Venue: Berliner Philharmonie, Berlin
- Genre: Jazz
- Length: 40:52
- Label: Flying Dutchman
- Producer: Joachim E. Berendt

Leon Thomas chronology
The Leon Thomas Album (1970)	Leon Thomas in Berlin (1971)	Gold Sunrise on Magic Mountain (1971)

Oliver Nelson chronology
Berlin Dialogue for Orchestra (1971)	Leon Thomas in Berlin (1971)	Swiss Suite (1971)

Leon Thomas in Berlin is a live album by the American jazz vocalist and percussionist Leon Thomas with the saxophonist/arranger Oliver Nelson. The album was recorded in 1970 in Berlin and released by Flying Dutchman.

== Reception ==
Professional ratings
Review scores
Source	Rating
AllMusic	5/5 stars

The authors of the AllMusic Guide to Jazz awarded the album 5 out of 5 stars.

In a review for Music on the Web (UK), Dick Stafford wrote: "Leon Thomas in Berlin is an excellent example of the work of this almost forgotten vocalist. Thomas was very much a maverick in terms of his singing style, his use of the yodel and other effects turned his voice very much into another frontline musical instrument in much the same manner as scat was used by earlier singers . The lasting impression given by this is of a highly Afro - American form of the idiom which was much in fashion in the late 60's and early 70's. In many ways it is a great pity that this vibrant music has fallen so far from grace to be replaced by the mainstream conservatism that is so omni-present in a great deal of the performances which define Jazz at the present time... The balance of the material is impeccable... The rhythm section on this concert is superb... This is a real gem of a re-release and I feel sure that it will become a favourite of anyone who is prepared to give this highly charged original music a chance."

== Track listing ==
All compositions by Leon Thomas except where noted

1. "Straight, No Chaser" (Thelonious Monk, Leon Thomas) − 6:32
2. "Pharoah's Tune (The Journey)" (Pharoah Sanders, Thomas) − 9:10
3. "Echoes" − 6:00
4. "Umbo Weti" − 9:20
5. "The Creator Has a Master Plan (Peace)" (Sanders, Thomas) − 8:43
6. "Oo-Wee! Hindewe" − 1:07

== Personnel ==
- Leon Thomas – African flute, African mouth organ, vocals, percussion
- Oliver Nelson – alto saxophone
- Arthur Sterling – piano
- Günter Lenz – double bass
- Lex Humphries – drums
- Sonny Morgan – bongos
