= Meet Oliver Nelson =

Studio album by Oliver Nelson
- Released: 1959
- Recorded: October 30, 1959
- Studio: Van Gelder Studio, Englewood Cliffs
- Genre: Jazz
- Length: 36:34
- Label: New Jazz; NJLP 8224
- Producer: Esmond Edwards

Oliver Nelson chronology
Meet Oliver Nelson (1959)	Taking Care of Business (1960)

Meet Oliver Nelson is the debut album by saxophonist Oliver Nelson recorded in 1959 and released on the New Jazz label.

== Reception ==
Professional ratings
Review scores
Source	Rating
Allmusic	4/5 stars
DownBeat	4/5 stars
The Penguin Guide to Jazz Recordings	3/4 stars

The Allmusic site awarded the album 4 stars stating "Although none of these Nelson tunes caught on, this was an impressive beginning to a short but productive career and gives one a strong example of the multi-talented Nelson's tenor playing".

== Track listing ==
All compositions by Oliver Nelson except as indicated

1. "Jams and Jellies" - 7:03
2. "Passion Flower" (Milt Raskin, Billy Strayhorn) - 6:51
3. "Don't Stand Up" - 3:44
4. "Ostinato" - 5:31
5. "What's New?" (Johnny Burke, Bob Haggart) - 6:53
6. "Booze Blues Baby" - 6:32

== Personnel ==
- Oliver Nelson - tenor saxophone
- Kenny Dorham - trumpet
- Ray Bryant - piano
- Wendell Marshall - bass
- Art Taylor - drums
