= Joyride (Stanley Turrentine album) =

Studio album by Stanley Turrentine
- Released: Early October 1965
- Recorded: April 14, 1965; Van Gelder Studio, Englewood Cliffs
- Genre: Soul jazz, hard bop
- Length: 42:57 CD reissue
- Label: Blue Note; BST 84201
- Producer: Alfred Lion

Stanley Turrentine chronology
| Mr. Natural (1964) | Joyride (1965) | Let It Go (1965) |

Professional ratings
Review scores
| Source | Rating |
|---|---|
| Allmusic | 4/5 stars |
| The Penguin Guide to Jazz Recordings | 3/4 stars |

Joyride is a 1965 studio album by jazz saxophonist Stanley Turrentine.

== Track listing ==
1. "River's Invitation" (Percy Mayfield) – 6:18
2. "I Wonder Where Our Love Has Gone" (Buddy Johnson) – 4:25
3. "Little Sheri" (Stanley Turrentine) – 6:29
4. "Mattie T." (Stanley Turrentine) – 5:59
5. "Bayou" (Jimmy Smith) – 6:18
6. "A Taste of Honey" (Ric Marlow, Robert Scott) – 3:57
7. "Gravy Train" (Lou Donaldson) – 4:38 Bonus track on CD
8. "A Kettle of Fish" (Jack McDuff) – 4:53 Bonus track on CD

== Personnel ==
- Stanley Turrentine – tenor saxophone
- Herbie Hancock – piano
- Kenny Burrell – guitar
- Bob Cranshaw – bass
- Grady Tate – drums

Orchestra

- Clark Terry, Ernie Royal, Snooky Young – trumpet
- Henry Coker, J.J. Johnson, Jimmy Cleveland – trombone
- Phil Woods – alto saxophone, clarinet
- Jerry Dodgion – alto saxophone, flute, alto flute, clarinet, piccolo flute
- Danny Bank – baritone saxophone, clarinet, bass clarinet, flute, alto flute
- Robert Ashton – tenor saxophone, clarinet
- Albert J. Johnson – tenor saxophone, soprano saxophone, clarinet, bass clarinet
- Oliver Nelson – arranger, conductor
