= Soul Battle =

1962 album by Oliver Nelson, King Curtis & Jimmy Forrest

Studio album by Oliver Nelson, King Curtis & Jimmy Forrest
- Released: May 1962
- Recorded: September 9, 1960
- Studios: Van Gelder Studio, Englewood Cliffs
- Genre: Jazz blues
- Length: 37:56
- Labels: Prestige; PRLP 7223
- Producer: Esmond Edwards

Oliver Nelson chronology
| Nocturne (1961) | Soul Battle (1962) | The Blues and the Abstract Truth (1961) |

King Curtis chronology
| Soul Meeting (1960) | Soul Battle (1962) | Arthur Murray's Music for Dancing: The Twist! (1961) |

Soul Battle is a studio album by the American saxophonists Oliver Nelson, King Curtis and Jimmy Forrest. Recorded in 1960 and originally released by the Prestige label in 1962, it was reissued on CD in 1991, featuring one additional track.

Professional ratings
Review scores
| Source | Rating |
|---|---|
| AllMusic | 4.5/5 stars |
| New Record Mirror | 4/5 stars |

== Track listing ==
All tracks composed by Oliver Nelson; except where noted.

1. "Blues at the Five Spot" - 5:43
2. "Blues for M.F. (Mort Fega)" - 9:37
3. "Anacruses" - 5:43
4. "Perdido" (Juan Tizol) - 9:22
5. "In Passing" - 7:31
6. "Soul Street" (Jimmy Forrest) - 9:07 Bonus track on CD reissue

== Personnel ==
- Oliver Nelson, King Curtis, Jimmy Forrest - tenor/alto saxophone
- Gene Casey - piano
- George Duvivier - bass
- Roy Haynes - drums
