= The Leon Thomas Album =

Studio album by Leon Thomas
- Released: 1970
- Recorded: 1970
- Studio: New York City
- Genre: Jazz
- Length: 39:08
- Label: Flying Dutchman; FD/FDS 10132
- Producer: Bob Thiele

Leon Thomas chronology
Spirits Known and Unknown (1970)	The Leon Thomas Album (1970)	Leon Thomas in Berlin (1971)

The Leon Thomas Album is the second album by American jazz vocalist and percussionist Leon Thomas recorded in 1970 and released by the Flying Dutchman label.

== Reception ==
Professional ratings
Review scores
Source	Rating
AllMusic	4/5 stars
Christgau's Record Guide	A

AllMusic reviewer Thom Jurek stated: "On the follow-up to the mind-blowing Spirits Known and Unknown, singer, multi-instrumentalist, arranger, and composer Leon Thomas decided to take a different track. Far from the sparely orchestrated ensembles of the previous works, Thomas loaded this set with jazz luminaries ... Side one is the up-tempo jazz ride, as Thomas and company rip through a host of his own tunes ... The real gem on the album is "Pharaoh's Tune (The Journey)," which comprises all of side two ... It's a breathtaking ride made all the more so by the long, jazzed-out setup of side one. Why this guy wasn't huge is a mystery.". Critic Robert Christgau said "He has literally expanded the musical possibilities of the human voice. He is as powerful a jazz/blues singer as Joe Williams or Joe Turner, both of whom he occasionally resembles, as inventive a scatter as Ella Fitzgerald ... I have to suspend my disbelief and recommend this record unreservedly to anyone with the slightest fondness for jazz".

== Track listing ==
All compositions by Leon Thomas except where noted

1. "Come Along" (Leon Thomas, Neal Creque) − 3:02
2. "I Am" − 3:17
3. "Bag's Groove" (Milt Jackson, Ellen May Shashoyan) − 3:19
4. "Um, Um, Um" − 11:35
5. "Pharoah's Tune (The Journey)" (Leon Thomas, Pharoah Sanders) − 17:55

== Personnel ==
- Leon Thomas − vocals, maracas, Thailand flute, Hindewe flute, Freedom flute (Ecuador), bells
- Ernie Royal − trumpet (tracks 1–3 & 5)
- Donald Smith (tracks 1–3 & 5), James Spaulding (tracks 4 & 5) − flute
- Sonny Morgan − bongos, African oboe
- Jerome Richardson − alto saxophone (tracks 1–3 & 5)
- Billy Harper − tenor saxophone (tracks 1–3 & 5)
- Howard Johnson − baritone saxophone (tracks 1–3 & 5)
- Arthur Sterling – piano
- John Williams Jr. − electric bass (tracks 1–3 & 5)
- Bob Cunningham − bass (tracks 4 & 5)
- Billy Cobham (tracks 1–3 & 5), Roy Haynes (tracks 4 & 5) − drums
- Gene Golden − bongos (tracks 4 & 5)
- Richie "Pablo" Landrum − congas
- Oliver Nelson − arranger, conductor (tracks 1–3 & 5)
