= Taking Care of Business (Oliver Nelson album) =

Studio album by Oliver Nelson
- Released: 1960
- Recorded: March 22, 1960
- Studio: Van Gelder Studio, Englewood Cliffs, NJ
- Genre: Jazz
- Length: 42:48
- Label: New Jazz; NJLP 8233
- Producer: Esmond Edwards

Oliver Nelson chronology
| Meet Oliver Nelson (1959) | Taking Care of Business (1960) | Lem's Beat (1960) |

Taking Care of Business is an album by saxophonist Oliver Nelson recorded in 1960 and released on the New Jazz label.

== Reception ==
Professional ratings
Review scores
| Source | Rating |
|---|---|
| Allmusic | 4.5/5 stars |
| The Penguin Guide to Jazz Recordings | 3/4 stars |

Allmusic reviewer Scott Yanow stated: "Oliver Nelson would gain his greatest fame later in his short life as an arranger/composer but this superior session puts the emphasis on his distinctive tenor and alto playing ... Nelson remains a vastly underrated saxophonist and all six performances on this recommended CD reissue (four of them his originals) are excellent".

== Track listing ==
All compositions by Oliver Nelson, except as indicated

1. "Trane Whistle" - 9:57
2. "Doxy" (Sonny Rollins) - 6:59
3. "In Time" - 5:33
4. "Lou's Good Dues Blues" - 6:18
5. "All the Way" (Sammy Cahn, Jimmy Van Heusen) - 7:34
6. "Groove" - 6:27

== Personnel ==
- Oliver Nelson - tenor saxophone, alto saxophone
- Lem Winchester - vibraphone
- Johnny "Hammond" Smith - organ
- George Tucker - bass
- Roy Haynes - drums
