= Berlin Dialogue for Orchestra =

Live album by Oliver Nelson and the "Berlin Dreamband"
- Released: 1971
- Recorded: November 5, 1970
- Venue: Berliner Jazztage, Berlin, Germany
- Genre: Jazz
- Label: Flying Dutchman FD 10134
- Producer: Bob Thiele

Oliver Nelson chronology
Zig Zag (1970)	Berlin Dialogue for Orchestra (1971)	Leon Thomas in Berlin (1971)

Berlin Dialogue for Orchestra is a live album by American jazz composer/arranger Oliver Nelson featuring performances by a big band recorded at the Berliner Jazztage in 1971 and first released on the Flying Dutchman label.

== Reception ==
Professional ratings
Review scores
Source	Rating
AllMusic	4.5/5 stars

The AllMusic review by Scott Yanow stated: "None of the individual pieces caught on but taken as a whole, this out-of-print LP should please big-band collectors and serves as a good example of Oliver Nelson's writing style".

== Track listing ==
All compositions by Oliver Nelson.

1. "Berlin Dialogue for Orchestra" - 18:25
  1. "Confrontation"
  2. "Check point Charlie"
  3. "Relative Calm"
  4. "Over the Wall"
2. "Impressions of Berlin: Ku-Damm" - 6:02
3. "Impressions of Berlin: Wannsee" - 5:21
4. "Impressions of Berlin: Heidi" - 6:07
5. "Impressions of Berlin: Berlin bei Nacht" - 5:14

== Personnel ==
- Oliver Nelson - alto saxophone, arranger, conductor
- Milo Pavlovic, Ronny Simmonds, Carmell Jones, Harry Stamp, Manfred Stoppachier - trumpet
- Slide Hampton, Barry Ross, Åke Persson, Charles Orieux, Kurt Masnick - trombone
- Leo Wright, Klaus Marmulla - alto saxophone
- Adi Feuerstien, Rolf Romer - tenor saxophone
- Jan Konopasek - baritone saxophone
- Freddy L'Host - clarinet
- Kai Rautenberg - piano
- Hajo Lange - bass
- Dai Bowen, Heinz Niemeyer - percussion
