= Swiss Suite =

Live album by Oliver Nelson
- Released: 1972
- Recorded: June 18, 1971
- Venue: Montreux Jazz Festival, Montreux, Switzerland
- Genre: Jazz
- Length: 44:49
- Label: Flying Dutchman FD 10149
- Producer: Bob Thiele

Oliver Nelson chronology
Leon Thomas in Berlin (1971)	Swiss Suite (1972)	Oliver Edward Nelson in London with Oily Rags (1974)

Swiss Suite is a live album by American jazz composer/arranger Oliver Nelson featuring performances by a big band with soloists Gato Barbieri (tenor sax) and Eddie "Cleanhead" Vinson (alto sax). The album was recorded at the Montreux Jazz Festival in 1971 for the Flying Dutchman label.

== Reception ==
Professional ratings
Review scores
Source	Rating
Allmusic	3/5 stars

The Allmusic site awarded the album 3 stars stating "it is the nearly 27-minute "Swiss Suite" that dominates this album and although tenorman Gato Barbieri has a couple of raging solos, it is a five-minute segment when guest altoist Eddie "Cleanhead" Vinson plays the blues that is most memorable. Vinson's classic spot alone is worth the price of this hard-to-find LP.".

== Track listing ==
All compositions by Oliver Nelson

1. "Swiss Suite" - 26:53
2. "Stolen Moments" - 8:38
3. "Black, Brown and Beautiful" - 3:15
4. "Blues and the Abstract Truth" - 6:03

== Personnel ==
- Oliver Nelson - alto saxophone, arranger, conductor
- Charles Tolliver - trumpet, flugelhorn
- Danny Moore, Rich Cole, Bernt Stean, Harry Beckett - trumpet
- Buddy Baker, Bertil Strandberg, Donald Beightol, C.J. Shibley, Monte Holz, John Thomas - trombone
- Jim Nissen - bass trombone
- Eddie "Cleanhead" Vinson (track 1), Jesper Thilo, Ozren Depolo - alto saxophone
- Gato Barbieri (track 1), Michael Urbaniak, Bob Sydor - tenor saxophone
- Steve Stevenson - baritone saxophone
- Stanley Cowell - piano
- Victor Gaskin, Hugo Rasmussen - bass
- Bernard Purdie - drums
- Bosko Petrovic - drums, vibraphone, tarabooka
- Na Na - berimbau
- Sonny Morgan - congas
