= More Blues and the Abstract Truth =

Studio album by Oliver Nelson
- Released: February 1965
- Recorded: November 10–11, 1964
- Studio: Van Gelder Studio, Englewood Cliffs, NJ
- Genre: Jazz
- Length: 43:10 original LP; 49:54 CD reissue
- Label: Impulse! A-75
- Producer: Bob Thiele

Oliver Nelson chronology
Fantabulous (1964)	More Blues and the Abstract Truth (1965)	Oliver Nelson Plays Michelle (1966)

More Blues and the Abstract Truth is an album by American jazz composer, conductor and arranger Oliver Nelson featuring performances recorded in 1964 for the Impulse! label.

== Reception ==
The Allmusic review by Scott Yanow awarded the album 4 stars, stating: "Unlike the original classic Blues and the Abstract Truth set from three years earlier, Oliver Nelson does not play on this album. He did contribute three of the eight originals and all of the arrangements but his decision not to play is disappointing... The emphasis is on blues-based pieces and there are some strong moments even if the date falls short of its predecessor".

Professional ratings
Review scores
Source	Rating
Allmusic	4/5 stars
Down Beat	5/5 stars
The Rolling Stone Jazz Record Guide	3/5 stars
The Penguin Guide to Jazz Recordings	3/4 stars

== Track listing ==
All compositions by Oliver Nelson except as noted

1. "Blues and the Abstract Truth" - 5:14
2. "Blues O'Mighty" (Hodges) - 6:48
3. "Theme from Mr. Broadway" (Brubeck) - 5:45
4. "Midnight Blue" (Neal Hefti) - 4:06
5. "The Critic's Choice" - 2:21
6. "One for Bob" - 6:07
7. "Blues for Mr. Broadway" (Brubeck) - 8:12
8. "Goin' to Chicago Blues" (Count Basie, Jimmy Rushing) - 4:37
9. "One for Phil" - 3:58 Bonus track on CD reissue
10. "Night Lights" (Arnold Shaw) - 2:46 Bonus track on CD reissue

Recorded on November 10, 1964 (tracks 4 & 6–9), and November 11, 1964 (tracks 1–3, 5 & 10).

== Personnel ==
- Oliver Nelson – arranger, conductor
- Thad Jones, Danny Moore (tracks 1 & 5) – trumpet
- Phil Woods – alto saxophone
- Ben Webster – tenor saxophone (tracks 4 & 7)
- Phil Bodner – tenor saxophone, English horn
- Pepper Adams – baritone saxophone
- Roger Kellaway – piano
- Richard Davis – bass
- Grady Tate – drums
