= Great Scott!! =

Studio album by Shirley Scott
- Released: Early July 1964
- Recorded: May 14 & 20, 1964; New York City
- Genre: Jazz
- Length: 33:39
- Label: Impulse! A-67
- Producer: Bob Thiele

Shirley Scott chronology
| Blue Flames (1964) | Great Scott!! (1964) | Everybody Loves a Lover (1964) |

Great Scott!! is an album by American jazz organist Shirley Scott recorded in 1964 for the Impulse! label.

== Reception ==
The Allmusic review awarded the album 4½ stars.

Professional ratings
Review scores
| Source | Rating |
|---|---|
| Allmusic | 4.5/5 stars |

== Track listing ==
All compositions by Shirley Scott except as indicated

1. "A Shot in the Dark" (Henry Mancini) – 3:15
2. "Great Scott" (Bob Hammer) – 2:30
3. "The Seventh Dawn" – 3:53
4. "Hoe Down" (Oliver Nelson) – 3:36
5. "Shadows of Paris" (Mancini) – 2:23
6. "Five O'Clock Whistle" (Kim Gannon, Gene Irwin, Josef Myrow) – 2:57
7. "The Blues Ain't Nothin' But Some Pain" – 4:59
8. "I'm Getting Sentimental Over You" (George Bassman, Ned Washington) – 3:22
9. "Make Someone Happy" (Betty Comden, Adolph Green, Jule Styne) – 6:44

Recorded on May 14 (tracks 6–9) and May 20 (tracks 1–5), 1964.

== Personnel ==
- Shirley Scott — organ, vocals
- Jerry Kail, Jimmy Nottingham, Joe Wilder, Snooky Young — trumpet (tracks 1–5)
- Willie Dennis, Urbie Green, Quentin Jackson, Tony Struda – trombone (tracks 1–5)
- Bob Ashton, Romeo Penque — reeds (tracks 1–5)
- Barry Galbraith — guitar (tracks 1–5)
- Bob Cranshaw (tracks 6–9), George Duvivier (tracks 1–5) — bass
- Otis Finch – drums (tracks 6–9)
- Osie Johnson, Johnny Pacheco, Willie Rodriguez – percussion (tracks 1–5)
- Lillian Clark, Jerry Graff – vocals (track 5)
- Oliver Nelson — arranger, conductor (tracks 1–5)
