= Peter & the Wolf (Jimmy Smith album) =

Studio album by Jimmy Smith
- Released: 1966
- Recorded: May 11–12, 1966
- Studios: Van Gelder Studio, Englewood Cliffs, NJ
- Genre: Jazz
- Length: 32:33
- Labels: Verve; V6-8652
- Producer: Creed Taylor

Jimmy Smith chronology
Hoochie Coochie Man (1966)	Peter & the Wolf (1966)	Jimmy & Wes: The Dynamic Duo (with Wes Montgomery) (1966)

Singles from Peter & the Wolf
- 1. "Cat in a Tree" Released: January 1967

Professional ratings
Review scores
Source	Rating
AllMusic	4.5/5 stars
The Penguin Guide to Jazz	2.5/4 stars

Peter & the Wolf is a 1966 studio album by Jimmy Smith, with Oliver Nelson's big band. It is based on Sergei Prokofiev's Peter and the Wolf.

== Reception ==
Scott Yanow of AllMusic stated:

Of all of organist Jimmy Smith's big-band albums recorded for Verve, this is one of the most imaginative ones...A classic of its kind.

== Track listing ==
1. "The Bird / The Duck / The Cat / The Grandfather / The Wolf / The Hunter / Peter" (Serge Prokofiev) – 4:09
2. "Duck Theme /Jimmy and the Duck / Peter's Theme / Meal Time" (Oliver Nelson, Prokofiev) – 9:39
3. "Elegy for a Duck" (Nelson) – 7:16
4. "Cat in a Tree" (Nelson) – 5:21
5. "Capture of the Wolf" (Nelson) – 1:14
6. "Finale: Parade / Peter Plays Some Blues" (Nelson) – 4:45

== Personnel ==
=== Musicians ===
- Jimmy Smith – organ
- Oliver Nelson – arranger, conductor
- Joe Newman, Ernie Royal, Richard Williams, Snooky Young – trumpet
- Phil Woods, Jerry Dodgion, Bob Ashton, Jerome Richardson, Danny Bank, Stan Webb – woodwinds
- Tony Studd – bass tuba
- Quentin Jackson, Dick Hixson, Britt Woodman, Tom McIntosh – trombone
- Willie Ruff, Jimmy Buffington – French horn
- Barry Galbraith, Billy Butler – guitar
- Richard Davis – bass
- Grady Tate – drums
- Harry Brewer, Bobby Rosengarden – percussion

=== Technical ===
- Creed Taylor – producer
- Val Valentin – director of engineering
- Rudy Van Gelder – engineer
- Acy R. Lehman – cover design
- Don Ornitz – photography
- Al "Jazzbo" Collins – liner notes
