= Nocturne (Oliver Nelson album) =

1961 album by Oliver Nelson with Lem Winchester

Studio album by Oliver Nelson with Lem Winchester
- Released: April 1961
- Recorded: August 23, 1960
- Studios: Van Gelder Studio, Englewood Cliffs, NJ
- Genre: Jazz
- Length: 39:33
- Labels: Moodsville; MVLP 13
- Producer: Esmond Edwards

Oliver Nelson chronology
Screamin' the Blues (1961)	Nocturne (1961)	Soul Battle (1962)

Nocturne is an album by the American saxophonist Oliver Nelson and vibraphonist Lem Winchester. It was originally released in 1961 by Prestige Records, as part of their "Moodsville Series". As the title implies, Nocturne is a collection of mellow songs with relaxed, late-night feeling.

Professional ratings
Review scores
Source	Rating
AllMusic	3.5/5 stars
The Penguin Guide to Jazz Recordings	3/4 stars

== Track listing ==
1. "Nocturne" (Nelson) - 3:46
2. "Bob's Blues" (Nelson) - 5:30
3. "Man With a Horn" (Eddie DeLange, Jack Jenney, Bonnie Lake) - 6:08
4. "Early Morning" (Nelson) - 4:48
5. "In a Sentimental Mood" (Duke Ellington, Manny Kurtz, Irving Mills) - 6:15
6. "Azur'te" (Wild Bill Davis, Don Wolf) - 5:42
7. "Time After Time" (Sammy Cahn, Jule Styne) - 7:24

== Personnel ==
- Oliver Nelson - alto and tenor saxophone
- Lem Winchester - vibes
- Richard Wyands - piano
- George Duvivier - bass
- Roy Haynes - drums
