= Sound Pieces =

Studio album by Oliver Nelson
- Released: End of January/February 1967
- Recorded: September 7, 27–28, 1966
- Studio: Capitol (New York City); United Western (Hollywood)
- Genre: Jazz
- Length: 39:58 original LP; 55:09 CD reissue
- Label: Impulse! A-9129
- Producer: Bob Thiele

Oliver Nelson chronology
Oliver Nelson Plays Michelle (1966)	Sound Pieces (1967)	Happenings (1966)

Sound Pieces is an album by American jazz composer, conductor and arranger Oliver Nelson featuring performances recorded in 1966 for the Impulse! label.

== Reception ==
The Allmusic review by Scott Yanow awarded the album 4 stars, stating: "Although best-known as an altoist and a tenor-saxophonist, Nelson sticks exclusively to soprano throughout the set. He leads a 20-piece big band on three of his compositions. Although one would not think of Nelson as a soprano stylist, his strong playing actually put him near the top of his field".

Professional ratings
Review scores
Source	Rating
Allmusic	4/5 stars

== Track listing ==
All compositions by Oliver Nelson except as indicated

1. "Sound Piece for Jazz Orchestra" - 9:44
2. "Flute Salad" - 2:49
3. "The Lady From Girl Talk" - 4:59
4. "The Shadow of Your Smile" (Mandel, Webster) - 9:44
5. "Patterns" - 6:19
6. "Elegy for a Duck" - 6:23

Bonus tracks on CD reissue:

7. "Straight, No Chaser" (Monk) - 9:10
8. "Example Seventy Eight" - 6:01

Recorded on September 7, 1966 (#4–8) and September 27, 1966 (#3) and September 28, 1966 (#1, 2).

== Personnel ==
Tracks 1–3

- Oliver Nelson – soprano saxophone, arranger, conductor
- John Audino, Bobby Bryant (#1–2), Conte Candoli, Ollie Mitchell, Al Porcino (#3) – trumpet
- Mike Barone, Billy Byers (#3), Richard Leith, Dick Noel (#1–2), Ernie Tack – trombone
- Bill Hinshaw, Richard Perissi – French horn
- Red Callender – tuba
- Gabe Baltazar – alto saxophone, clarinet, alto flute
- Bill Green – piccolo, flute, alto flute, alto saxophone
- Plas Johnson – tenor saxophone, bass clarinet, flute, alto flute
- Bill Perkins – tenor saxophone, bass clarinet, flute, alto flute
- Jack Nimitz – baritone saxophone, bass clarinet
- Mike Melvoin – piano
- Ray Brown – bass
- Shelly Manne – drums

Recorded in Hollywood

Tracks 4–8

- Oliver Nelson – soprano saxophone
- Steve Kuhn – piano
- Ron Carter – bass
- Grady Tate – drums

Recorded in New York
