= Fantabulous (album) =

Studio album by Oliver Nelson
- Released: c. July 1964
- Recorded: March 19, 1964
- Studio: Universal Recording Corp. (Chicago)
- Genre: Jazz
- Length: 34:24
- Label: Argo
- Producer: Esmond Edwards

Oliver Nelson chronology
Full Nelson (1963)	Fantabulous (1964)	More Blues and the Abstract Truth (1964)

Professional ratings
Review scores
Source	Rating
AllMusic	4/5 stars

Fantabulous is an album by Oliver Nelson. It was recorded in 1964 and released that year by Argo Records.

== Recording and music ==
The album was recorded at Universal Recording Corp. in Chicago, on March 19, 1964. Six of the eight pieces were composed by Nelson.

== Releases and reception ==
Fantabulous was released by Argo Records around July 1964. It was reissued on CD by Verve Records, and was part of Mosaic Records' box set of Nelson big band recordings.

Critic Marc Myers wrote in 2015: "What makes this album special are the heavyweight bluesy solos by pianist Patti Bown, alto saxophonist Phil Woods, flutist Jerome Richardson and Nelson's tenor sax. Nelson's writing is strong, complex and varied throughout but always swinging. It's cinematic but not Hollywood. More action TV than big screen."

== Track listing ==
All tracks by Oliver Nelson, unless otherwise noted.

1. "Hobo Flats" - 4:12
2. "Post No Bills" - 5:28
3. "A Bientot" (Billy Taylor) - 3:46
4. "Three Plus One" - 3:23
5. "Take Me With You" (Nelson, Grady Tate) - 5:27
6. "Daylie's Double" - 4:00
7. "Teenie's Blues" - 4:07
8. "Laz-ie Kate" - 4:01

== Personnel ==
- Oliver Nelson - tenor saxophone, arranger and conductor
- Phil Woods - alto saxophone, clarinet
- Kenny Soderblom - alto sax, flute
- Harold Dessent - alto sax, flute
- Bob Ashton - tenor sax, clarinet
- Jerome Richardson - baritone saxophone, flute, alto flute
- Art Hoyle, Snooky Young - trumpet
- Ray Weigand - trombone
- Tony Studd - bass trombone
- Patti Bown - piano
- Ben Tucker - bass
- Grady Tate - drums
