= Afro/American Sketches =

Studio album by Oliver Nelson Orchestra
- Released: February 1962
- Recorded: September 29 & November 10, 1961
- Studio: Van Gelder Studio, Englewood Cliffs
- Genre: Jazz
- Length: 41:30
- Label: Prestige; PRLP 7225

Oliver Nelson Orchestra chronology
Main Stem (1961)	Afro/American Sketches (1962)	Impressions of Phaedra (1962)

Professional ratings
Review scores
Source	Rating
Allmusic	4/5 stars
Down Beat	3.5/5 stars
The Rolling Stone Jazz Record Guide	4/5 stars
The Penguin Guide to Jazz Recordings	3/4 stars

Afro/American Sketches is a jazz album by Oliver Nelson recorded in late 1961 and released in 1962. It is his first big band album as a leader.

In a June 7, 1962, review for Down Beat magazine jazz critic Richard B. Hadlock said this of Nelson: "In his penchant for melodic simplicity and inner complexity he is close to the secret of Duke Ellington's most enduring scores, and in his thick linear voicing there are echoes of Gil Evans at his best."

== Track listing ==
All tracks composed by Nelson.

1. "Message" – 5:56
2. "Jungleaire" – 6:33
3. "Emancipation Blues" – 8:11
4. "There's a Yearnin'" – 4:24
5. "Going Up North" – 6:11
6. "Disillusioned" – 5:36
7. "Freedom Dance" – 4:39

Recorded on September 29 (#1, 3, 4, 6, 7) and November 10 (#2, 5), 1961.

== Personnel ==
Tracks 2, 5

- Oliver Nelson – arranger, alto saxophone, tenor saxophone
- Joe Newman, Clyde Reasinger, Ernie Royal – trumpet
- Billy Byers, Paul Faulise, Melba Liston – trombone
- Don Butterfield – tuba
- Eric Dixon – tenor saxophone, flute
- Jerry Dodgion – flute
- Art Davis – bass
- Ed Shaughnessy – drums
- Ray Barretto – congas, bongos

Tracks 1, 3, 4, 6, 7

- Oliver Nelson – arranger, alto saxophone, tenor saxophone
- Jerry Kail, Joe Newman, Ernie Royal, Joe Wilder – trumpet
- Paul Faulise, Urbie Green, Britt Woodman – trombone
- Ray Alonge, Jim Buffington, Julius Watkins – French horn
- Don Butterfield – tuba
- Jerry Dodgion – alto sax, flute
- Eric Dixon – tenor saxophone, flute
- Bob Ashton – tenor saxophone, flute, clarinet
- Patti Bown – piano
- Peter Makas, Charles McCracken – violoncello
- Art Davis – bass
- Ed Shaughnessy – drums
- Ray Barretto – congas, bongos
