= Straight Ahead (Oliver Nelson album) =

Studio album by Oliver Nelson
- Released: 1961
- Recorded: March 1, 1961
- Studio: Van Gelder Studio, Englewood Cliffs
- Genre: Jazz, hard bop
- Length: 36:53
- Label: New Jazz; NJ 8255
- Producer: Esmond Edwards

Oliver Nelson chronology
The Blues and the Abstract Truth (1961)	Straight Ahead (1961)	Main Stem (1961)

Professional ratings
Review scores
Source	Rating
Allmusic	4.5/5 stars
Down Beat	4/5 stars
The Rolling Stone Jazz Record Guide	4/5 stars
The Penguin Guide to Jazz Recordings	3/4 stars

Straight Ahead is a jazz studio album by saxophonist Oliver Nelson. It features acclaimed musicians such as Eric Dolphy on sax, clarinet and flute (his last appearance on a Nelson album following a series of collaborations recorded for Prestige), and Roy Haynes on drums. It was recorded in March 1961 at the celebrated Van Gelder Studio in Englewood Cliffs. All the pieces were first takes; Joe Goldberg recalls: "The session was scheduled for one in the afternoon and I arrived at 3:30, thinking that by then the music would have been rehearsed and the men would be starting to play. What I found was a studio empty of everyone but A&R man Esmond Edwards", the supervisor, "and engineer Rudy Van Gelder, who were packing up to leave and looking very satisfied." Released in 1961 for the Prestige/New Jazz label (as NJ 8255) and remastered in 1989, the album is notable for its long and thoughtful horn duets by Dolphy and Nelson. Don DeMicheal described the album "All in all, a warm, very human record".

== Notes about the song titles ==
In the original liner notes, Joe Goldberg talks about some of the tracks in the album: "Six and Four" is so named because the piece shifts from 6/4 to 4/4. "Mama Lou" is named for Nelson's older sister, a teacher in St. Louis. Nelson stated that his sister was "one of those people who displays two different moods" and that he "tried to capture them both." Last but not least, "111-44" was so named because of an address number, the one from which Nelson had just moved.

== Track listing ==
All pieces by Oliver Nelson, unless otherwise noted.

1. "Images" - 5:43
2. "Six and Four" - 7:15
3. "Mama Lou" - 5:04
4. "Ralph's New Blues" (Milt Jackson) - 9:52
5. "Straight Ahead" - 5:31
6. "111-44" - 3:28

== Personnel ==
- Oliver Nelson - alto saxophone (1,2,3,5,6), tenor saxophone (3,4), clarinet (4)
- Eric Dolphy - alto saxophone (2,3,5), bass clarinet (1,4,6), flute (3)
- Richard Wyands - piano
- George Duvivier - double bass
- Roy Haynes - drums
