= Gold Sunrise on Magic Mountain =

Live album by Leon Thomas
- Released: 1971
- Recorded: June 18, 1971
- Venue: Montreux Jazz Festival, Switzerland
- Genre: Jazz
- Length: 37:05
- Label: Mega/Flying Dutchman; M51-5003
- Producer: Bob Thiele

Leon Thomas chronology
| Leon Thomas in Berlin (1971) | Gold Sunrise on Magic Mountain (1971) | Blues and the Soulful Truth (1972) |

Gold Sunrise on Magic Mountain is a live album by American jazz vocalist and percussionist Leon Thomas recorded at the Montreux Jazz Festival in 1971 and released by Mega Records on their Flying Dutchman Series.

Professional ratings
Review scores
| Source | Rating |
|---|---|
| AllMusic | 2/5 stars |

== Track listing ==
All compositions by Leon Thomas except where noted

1. "The Honey Man/Chains of Love" (Thomas/A. Nugetre, Van Walls) – 12:28
2. "Cousin Mary" (John Coltrane, Thomas) – 7:45
3. "Na Na/Umbo Weti" – 16:52
4. "What A Wonderful World" (Louis Armstrong) – 2:18

== Personnel ==
- Leon Thomas − vocals, percussion
- Oliver Nelson − alto saxophone
- Neal Creque - piano
- Cornell Dupree – guitar
- Victor Gaskin − bass
- David Lee Jr. – drums
- Sonny Morgan − congas
- Naná Vasconcelos − berimbau, percussion
