= Louis Armstrong and His Friends =

Studio album by Louis Armstrong
- Released: 1970
- Recorded: May 26–27 & 29, 1970; New York City
- Genre: Jazz
- Length: 52:20
- Labels: Flying Dutchman/Amsterdam; M31-1012
- Producer: Bob Thiele

Louis Armstrong chronology
| Disney Songs the Satchmo Way (1968) | Louis Armstrong and His Friends (1970) | Louis 'Country & Western' Armstrong (1970) |

Louis Armstrong and His Friends is an album by Louis Armstrong recorded in 1970 and originally released by Flying Dutchman on their Amsterdam subsidiary label.

== Reception ==
Professional ratings
Review scores
| Source | Rating |
|---|---|
| AllMusic | 3/5 stars |
| The Penguin Guide to Jazz Recordings | 2/4 stars |

AllMusic reviewer Alex Henderson stated "Louis Armstrong and His Friends isn't among the trumpeter/singer's essential releases, but it is certainly interesting, enjoyable, and historically important. Recorded in May 1970, Louis Armstrong and His Friends was his next-to-last studio session ... Armstrong was in poor health; in fact, he wasn't well enough to do any trumpet playing on this album. But he was still able to sing, and he gets his points across ... Louis Armstrong and His Friends sometimes goes out of its way to sound contemporary (by early-'70s standards). And for the most part, it works ... short of essential, but for Armstrong's truly devoted fans, it is a fascinating (if imperfect) album to listen to".

== Track listing ==
1. "We Shall Overcome" (Zilphia Horton, Guy Carawan, Frank Hamilton, Pete Seeger) − 6:43
2. "Everybody's Talkin' (Echoes)" (Fred Neil) − 3:04
3. "What a Wonderful World" (Bob Thiele, George David Weiss) − 3:21
4. "Boy from New Orleans" (Ruth Roberts, Bill Katz, Thiele) − 3:57
5. "The Creator Has a Master Plan (Peace)" (Pharoah Sanders, Leon Thomas) − 4:15
6. "Give Peace a Chance" (John Lennon, Paul McCartney) − 4:35
7. "Mood Indigo" (Duke Ellington, Barney Bigard, Irving Mills) − 3:20
8. "His Father Wore Long Hair" (Pauline Rivelli, Thiele, Weiss) − 2:32
9. "My One and Only Love" (Guy Wood, Robert Mellin) − 3:19
10. "This Black Cat Has Nine Lives" (Lorenzo Pack) − 2:47
11. "Here Is My Heart for Christmas" (Rivelli, Thiele, Weiss) − 2:38 Additional track on CD reissue
12. "The Creator Has a Master Plan (Peace)" [previously unreleased mix] (Sanders, Thomas) − 5:56 Additional track on CD reissue
13. "The Creator Has a Master Plan (Peace) [previously unreleased mix] (Sanders, Thomas) − 5:53 Additional track on CD reissue

== Personnel ==
- Louis Armstrong − vocals
- Ernie Royal, Jimmy Owens, Marvin Stamm, Thad Jones − trumpet, flugelhorn (tracks 1, 4, 5 & 10)
- Al Grey, Bill Campbell, Garnett Brown, Quentin Jackson − trombone (tracks 1, 4, 5 & 10)
- James Spaulding − flute (tracks: 1–3, 5, 7–9 & 11–13)
- Billy Harper, Daniel Bank, Jerry Dodgion, Ray Beckenstein, Robert Ashton - saxophones (tracks 1, 4, 5 & 10)
- Frank Owens − piano
- Kenny Burrell, Sam Brown − guitar
- Richard Davis, George Duvivier − bass (tracks 2, 3, 5, 7–9 & 11–13)
- Chuck Rainey (tracks 1, 4, 6 & 10), John Williams Jr. (tracks 2, 3, 5, 7–9 & 11–13) − electric bass
- Bernard Purdie – drums
- Gene Golden − congas (tracks 1, 2, 4–6, 8, 9, 12 & 13)
- Arnold Black, Manny Green, Gene Orloff, Harry Lookofsky, Joe Malin, Matthew Raimondi, Max Pollikoff, Paul Gershman, Selwart Richard Clarke, Winston Collymore − violin (tracks 2, 3, 5 & 7–9)
- Alfred Brown, David Schwartz, Emanuel Vardi, Julien Barber − violin (tracks 2, 3, 5 & 7–9)
- Allan Schulman, Charles McCracken, George Ricci, Kermit Moore − cello (tracks 2, 3, 5 & 7–9)
- Leon Thomas − vocals (tracks 5, 11 & 12)
- Janice Bell (tracks 1, 4, 6 & 10), Tony Bennett (track 1), Ruby Braff (track 1), Eddie Condon (track 1), Miles Davis (track 1), Ornette Coleman (track 1), Ila Govan (tracks 1, 4, 6 & 10), Bobby Hackett (track 1), Carl Hall (tracks 1, 4, 6 & 10), Chico Hamilton (track 1), Matthew Ledbetter (tracks 1, 4, 6 & 10), Father O'Connor (track 1), Tasha Thomas tracks 1, 4, 6 & 10), George Wein (track 1) − chorus
- Oliver Nelson − arranger, conductor
