= Oliver Nelson Plays Michelle =

Studio album by Oliver Nelson
- Released: 1966
- Recorded: April 13 & 14, 1966
- Studio: Van Gelder Studio, Englewood Cliffs NJ
- Genre: Jazz
- Length: 34:49
- Label: Impulse!
- Producer: Bob Thiele

Oliver Nelson chronology
More Blues and the Abstract Truth (1964)	Oliver Nelson Plays Michelle (1966)	Sound Pieces (1966)

Oliver Nelson Plays Michelle is an album by American jazz composer, arranger and saxophonist Oliver Nelson, featuring solos by Nelson and Phil Woods, recorded in 1966 for the Impulse! label.

== Reception ==
The Allmusic review by Douglas Payne awarded the album 2, stars stating: "This is an album of short, often corny tunes and brief, likable solos."

Professional ratings
Review scores
Source	Rating
Allmusic	2/5 stars
DownBeat	4/5 stars

== Track listing ==
1. "Island Virgin" (Duke Ellington, Billy Strayhorn) - 3:29
2. "These Boots Are Made for Walkin'" (Lee Hazlewood) - 2:51
3. "Jazz Bug" (Oliver Nelson) - 3:05
4. "Together Again" (Buck Owens) - 3:07
5. "Flowers on the Wall" (Lew DeWitt) - 2:35
6. "Yesterday" (John Lennon, Paul McCartney) - 2:44
7. "Once Upon a Time" (Johnny Hodges) - 3:36
8. "Michelle" (Lennon, McCartney) - 2:29
9. "Do You See What I See?" (George Douglas, Oliver Nelson, George David Weiss) - 2:46
10. "Fantastic, That's You" (George Cates, George Douglas) - 2:59
11. "Beautiful Music" (Douglas, Weiss) - 2:19
12. "(Land of Meadows) Meadowland" (Gusser, Knipper, Rome, Sirmay) - 2:49
- Recorded at Van Gelder Studio on April 13, 1966 (tracks 1, 2, 5, 7, 10 & 11), and April 14, 1966 (tracks 3, 4, 6, 8, 9 & 12)

== Personnel ==
Tracks 1, 2, 5, 7, 10 & 11

- Oliver Nelson – alto saxophone, tenor saxophone, arranger, conductor
- Clark Terry, Snooky Young – trumpet, flugelhorn
- Phil Woods – alto saxophone
- Romeo Penque – tenor saxophone, alto flute
- Danny Bank – baritone saxophone
- Hank Jones – piano
- Billy Butler – guitar, electric bass
- Al Lucas – electric guitar
- Bob Cranshaw – bass
- Grady Tate – drums
- Bobby Rosengarden – percussion

Tracks 3, 4, 6, 8, 9 & 12

- Oliver Nelson – alto saxophone, tenor saxophone, arranger, conductor
- Clark Terry, Snooky Young, Joe Newman – trumpet, flugelhorn
- Phil Woods – alto saxophone
- Jerome Richardson – tenor saxophone, flute, alto flute
- Danny Bank – baritone saxophone
- Hank Jones – piano
- Barry Galbraith – guitar
- Richard Davis – bass
- Grady Tate – drums
- Bobby Rosengarden – percussion
