= Otis Finch =

American jazz drummer

- Birth name: Otis Finch, Jr.
- Born: September 5, 1933; Detroit, U.S.
- Died: July 13, 1982 (aged 48); Seattle, Washington, U.S.
- Genres: Jazz
- Occupation: Musician
- Instrument: Drums
- Labels: Argo, Smash Records, Blue Note

Otis "Candy" Finch, Jr. was an American jazz drummer.

He played and recorded with Stanley Turrentine, Shirley Scott, Milt Jackson, and Dizzy Gillespie (1966-9).

Finch also recorded with Gene Ammons, Billy Mitchell, Al Grey, and Big John Patton.

== Discography ==
With Al Grey

- Night Song (Argo, 1962)
- Having a Ball (Argo, 1963)

With Milt Jackson

- Milt Jackson at the Museum of Modern Art (Limelight, 1965)
- Born Free (Limelight, 1966)

With Billy Mitchell

- This Is Billy Mitchell (1962, Smash)

With Big John Patton

- Let 'Em Roll (Blue Note, 1965 [1966])

With Shirley Scott

- Hip Twist (Prestige, 1962)
- Blue Flames (Prestige, 1964) - with Stanley Turrentine
- Great Scott!! (Impulse, 1964)
- Travelin' Light (Prestige, 1964) - with Kenny Burrell

With Stanley Turrentine

- That's Where It's At (Blue Note, 1962)
- Let It Go (Impulse 1964-66 [1967])
- Hustlin' (Blue Note, 1964 [1965])
- In Memory Of (Blue Note, 1964 [1979])

With Dizzy Gillespie

- Swing Low, Sweet Cadillac (Impulse!, 1967)
- The Dizzy Gillespie Reunion Big Band (MPS, 1968)
- The Real Thing (Perception, 1969)
