= Lem Winchester =

American jazz vibraphone player (1928–1961)

- Born: Lemuel Winchester; March 19, 1928; Wilmington, Delaware, U.S.
- Died: January 13, 1961 (aged 32) Indianapolis, Indiana, U.S.
- Genres: Jazz
- Occupations: Police officer
- Instruments: Vibraphone
- Years active: 1958–1961
- Labels: Prestige Records

Lem Winchester (March 19, 1928 – January 13, 1961) was an American jazz vibraphone player.

== Early life ==
Lemuel Winchester was born in Wilmington, Delaware. His parents were politician William J. Winchester and Alverta Winchester.

== Career ==
Formerly a police officer, Winchester pursued music as a hobby in Wilmington, Delaware. He turned to music full-time after an appearance at the 1958 Newport Jazz Festival. He was soon working with some of the top names in jazz, making his debut recording with pianist Ramsey Lewis.

Winchester recorded a handful of albums as a leader, and made sideman appearances with the likes of saxophonist Oliver Nelson, and organists Jack McDuff and Shirley Scott. Most of his recordings were with Prestige Records. Critic Scott Yanow has suggested that while Winchester's playing was strongly influenced by Milt Jackson, he "did not stick around long enough to carve out his own original voice" on the vibraphone.

== Death ==
Winchester died at the age of 32 as a result of a handgun accident in Indianapolis, Indiana.

== Discography ==
=== As leader ===
- 1958: New Faces at Newport (Metrojazz) split album with Randy Weston
- 1958: Lem Winchester and the Ramsey Lewis Trio (Argo) with Ramsey Lewis
- 1959: Winchester Special (New Jazz) with Benny Golson
- 1960: Lem's Beat (New Jazz)
- 1960: Another Opus (New Jazz)
- 1961: With Feeling (Moodsville)

=== As sideman ===
- 1960: Jack McDuff, Tough 'Duff (Prestige)
- 1960: Oliver Nelson, Taking Care of Business (New Jazz)
- 1960: Oliver Nelson, Nocturne (Moodsville)
- 1960: Shirley Scott, Soul Sister (Prestige)
- 1960: Etta Jones, Something Nice (2 cuts only) (Prestige)
- 1961: Johnny "Hammond" Smith, Gettin' the Message (Prestige)
- 1963: Etta Jones, Hollar! (4 cuts) (Prestige)
