= Main Stem (album) =

Studio album by Oliver Nelson with Joe Newman
- Released: October 1962
- Recorded: August 25, 1961
- Studio: Van Gelder Studio, Englewood Cliffs, NJ
- Genre: Jazz
- Length: 35:50
- Label: Prestige; PRLP 7236
- Producer: Esmond Edwards

Oliver Nelson chronology
Straight Ahead (1961)	Main Stem (1962)	Afro/American Sketches (1962)

Main Stem is an album by American saxophonist Oliver Nelson with trumpeter Joe Newman. It was originally released in 1962 on Prestige Records, and reissued by Prestige on CD in 1992.

Professional ratings
Review scores
Source	Rating
Down Beat	3.5/5 stars
Allmusic	4/5 stars
The Penguin Guide to Jazz Recordings	3/4 stars

== Track listing ==
All compositions by Oliver Nelson, except where noted

1. "Main Stem" (Duke Ellington) – 6:52
2. "J & B" – 5:51
3. "Ho!" – 4:33
4. "Latino" – 6:12
5. "Tipsy" – 5:19
6. "Tangerine" (Johnny Mercer and Victor Schertzinger) – 7:03

== Personnel ==
- Oliver Nelson – tenor saxophone
- Joe Newman – trumpet
- Hank Jones – piano
- George Duvivier – bass
- Charlie Persip – drums
- Ray Barretto – congas
