= Leon Thomas (jazz singer) =

American singer (1937–1999)

- Born: Amos Leon Thomas Jr. October 4, 1937; East St. Louis, Illinois, U.S.
- Died: May 8, 1999 (aged 61) Bronx, New York
- Genres: Free jazz, blues, soul jazz
- Occupation: Singer
- Years active: 1950s–1970s
- Label: Flying Dutchman

Amos Leon Thomas Jr. (October 4, 1937 – May 8, 1999), known professionally as Leon Thomas, was an American jazz and blues vocalist, born in East St. Louis, Illinois, and known for his bellowing glottal-stop style of free jazz singing in the late 1960s and 1970s.

== Life and career ==
Leon Thomas was born Amos Thomas Jr. on October 4, 1937, in East St. Louis, Illinois. He studied music at Tennessee State University. At the time of his studies, he had begun a singing career as a guest vocalist for the jazz bands of percussionist Armando Peraza, saxophonist Jimmy Forrest, and guitarist Grant Green. His musical development at this time was shaped in part by seeing saxophonist John Coltrane perform in trumpeter Miles Davis's sextet during the late 1950s. Thomas moved to New York City in 1959, singing at the Apollo Theater as a vocalist for acts such as jazz ensemble The Jazz Messengers and singer Dakota Staton. In 1961, he joined the Count Basie Orchestra but soon left after being conscripted into the army.

Thomas was discharged from the army in the late 1960s and resumed his music career, first working with avant-garde jazz saxophonist Pharoah Sanders. In 1969, he released his first solo album for Bob Thiele's Flying Dutchman label. Thomas became best known for his work with Sanders, particularly the 1969 song "The Creator Has a Master Plan" from Sanders' Karma album. Thomas's most distinctive device was that he often broke out into yodeling in the middle of a vocal. This style has influenced singers James Moody, Tim Buckley and Bobby McFerrin. He said in an interview that he developed this style after he fell and broke his teeth before an important show. Some of the vocal style is classified as 'jive singing'. (Ref: Leon Thomas Blues Band album). Thomas saw music as a means of social commentary during this period, saying, "You just have to be more than an entertainer. How the blazes can you ignore what is happening?"

Through the 1970s, Thomas recorded a series of critically acclaimed records for Flying Dutchman, and performed with the bands of trumpeter Freddie Hubbard and guitarist Carlos Santana, touring as a member of the Santana band in 1973. He later appeared on recordings with saxophonist Gary Bartz and singer Jeri Brown. In the mid-1970s, he adopted "Leon" as his middle name.

During the late 1990s, Thomas toured the US and Europe with a band named Blueswing, led by Music Director/Guitarist Kevin McNeal, Billy Kaye on Drums, Ian McDonald/piano and Hilliard Greene/stick double bass. On May 8, 1999, Thomas died of heart failure, resulting from leukemia, at a Bronx hospital near his home.

== Appraisal ==
Thomas has been called the "John Coltrane of jazz vocalists". According to music essayist and yodel expert Bart Plantenga, he combined scat singing, vocalese techniques from African tradition, and a unique approach to yodeling, "performing ritualistic vocals infused by spiritual quests, soul music, and Pygmy yodeling techniques." Thomas's extension of the anthropological "verbal energy"—"whenever his Pygmy-yodel-scat erupted from the opening at the top of his larynx"—returns the listener back to "Pygmy yodeling not only via ethnomusicological investigation but via ur-soul, or back-to-Africa spiritual pilgrimage", Plantenga said.

According to Ben Ratliff of The New York Times, Thomas had begun his career "as a straight blues-jazz singer" with a "stout tenor voice", but by the mid-1960s, he "had begun to spend time with young jazz musicians who were looking to Africa, the East and meditation for musical material … Thomas developed his ululating singing style, which has been compared to African pygmy and American Indian singing techniques and which he later called 'soularphone.' He believed that his ancestors had given him his elastic throat articulation, he said, and henceforth always used it." Robert Christgau wrote of the significance behind Thomas's vocal abilities in Christgau's Record Guide: Rock Albums of the Seventies (1981):

He has literally expanded the musical possibilities of the human voice. He is as powerful a jazz/blues singer as Joe Williams or Joe Turner, both of whom he occasionally resembles, as inventive a scatter as Ella Fitzgerald. But that's just the beginning, for despite the generation lag, Thomas beats Turner and Williams in their mode even while singing his own, and he turns scatting from a virtuoso trick into an atavistic call from the unconscious.

AllMusic critic Thom Jurek, impressed especially by The Leon Thomas Album (1970), was mystified by "why this guy wasn't huge", while Tom Hull said, "In a simpler time, he would have been a classic blues shouter."

== Discography ==
=== As leader ===
- Spirits Known and Unknown (Flying Dutchman, 1969)
- The Leon Thomas Album (Flying Dutchman, 1970)
- Leon Thomas in Berlin (Flying Dutchman, 1971) with Oliver Nelson
- Gold Sunrise on Magic Mountain (Mega, 1971)
- Blues and the Soulful Truth (Flying Dutchman, 1972)
- Full Circle (Flying Dutchman, 1973)
- Precious Energy (Mapleshade, 1990) with Gary Bartz

=== As sideman ===
With Pharoah Sanders

- Karma (Impulse!, 1969)
- Jewels of Thought (Impulse!, 1969)
- Izipho Zam (My Gifts) (Strata-East, 1973)
- Shukuru (Theresa, 1985)
- Oh Lord, Let Me Do No Wrong (Doctor Jazz, 1987)

With Santana

- Welcome (Columbia, 1973)
- Lotus (Columbia, 1991)

With others

- Louis Armstrong, Louis Armstrong and His Friends (Flying Dutchman/Amsterdam, 1970)
- Count Basie, Pop Goes the Basie (Reprise, 1965)
- Jeri Brown, Zaius (Justin Time, 1998)
- Louis Hayes, Variety Is the Spice (Gryphon, 1979)
- Johnny Hodges, 3 Shades of Blue (Flying Dutchman, 1970) with Oliver Nelson
- Dave Liebman, Light'n Up, Please! (Horizon/A&M, 1977)
- Archie Shepp, Kwanza (Impulse!, 1974)
- Malachi Thompson, Spirit (Delmark, 1983)
- Cedar Walton, Soundscapes (Columbia, 1980)
