= The Blues and the Abstract Truth =

- 1995 US CD issue/ Original LP cover

Studio album by Oliver Nelson
- Released: August 1961
- Recorded: February 23, 1961
- Studios: Van Gelder Studio; Englewood Cliffs, New Jersey
- Genre: Post-bop
- Length: 36:33
- Label: Impulse!
- Producer: Creed Taylor

Oliver Nelson chronology
Soul Battle (1960)	The Blues and the Abstract Truth (1961)	Straight Ahead (1961)

Alternate cover
- Second LP cover/1990 US CD issue

Audio sample
- "Teenie's Blues" (stereo mix): file; help

Professional ratings
Review scores
Source	Rating
DownBeat (Original Lp release)	4/5 stars
AllMusic	5/5 stars
The Rolling Stone Jazz Record Guide	5/5 stars
Encyclopedia of Popular Music	5/5 stars
The Penguin Guide to Jazz Recordings	4/4 stars

The Blues and the Abstract Truth is an album by American composer and jazz saxophonist Oliver Nelson recorded in February 1961 for the Impulse! label. It remains Nelson's most acclaimed album and features a lineup of notable musicians: Freddie Hubbard, Eric Dolphy (his second-to-last appearance on a Nelson album following a series of collaborations recorded for Prestige), Bill Evans (his only appearance with Nelson), Paul Chambers and Roy Haynes. Baritone saxophonist George Barrow does not take solos but remains a key feature in the subtle voicings of Nelson's arrangements. The album is often noted for its unique ensemble arrangements and is frequently identified as a progenitor of Nelson's move towards arranging later in his career.

== Music ==
Among the pieces on the album, "Stolen Moments" is the best known and has become a jazz standard: a 16-bar piece with solos in a conventional 12-bar minor blues structure in C minor. "Hoe-Down", inspired by the fifth section of Aaron Copland's Rodeo, is built on a 44-bar structure (with 32-bar solos based on rhythm changes). "Cascades" modifies the traditional 32-bar AABA form by using a 16-bar minor blues for the A section, stretching the form to a total of 56 bars. The B-side of the album contains three tracks that hew closer to the 12-bar form: "Yearnin'", "Butch and Butch" and "Teenie's Blues" (which opens with two 12-bar choruses of bass solo by Chambers).

Nelson's later album, More Blues and the Abstract Truth (1964), features an entirely different (and larger) group of musicians and bears little resemblance to this record.

== Reception ==
Writing in the December 21, 1961, issue of DownBeat magazine, jazz critic Don DeMicheal commented:

Nelson's playing is like his writing: thoughtful, unhackneyed, and well constructed. Hubbard steals the solo honors with some of his best playing on record. Dolphy gets off some good solos too, his most interesting one on "Yearnin'".

The Jazz Journal International cited the album as "one of the essential post-bop recordings".

It was voted number 333 in the third edition of Colin Larkin's All Time Top 1000 Albums (2000).

In 2026, The Blues and the Abstract Truth was selected by the Library of Congress for preservation in the National Recording Registry for its "cultural, historical or aesthetic importance in the nation's recorded sound heritage."

== Other versions/influences ==
The composition "Stolen Moments" has been recorded and performed by numerous musicians including Phil Woods, J. J. Johnson, Frank Zappa, Ahmad Jamal, Booker Ervin, the United Future Organization and the Turtle Island Quartet. The first eight bars of Nelson's solo on the bridge of "Hoe-Down" were quoted by Ernie Watts and Lee Ritenour in the song "Bullet Train" from their 1979 album Friendship. "Teenie's Blues" was used as a 2009 show-opener by rock band Steely Dan.

In 2008, pianist Bill Cunliffe released the tribute album The Blues and the Abstract Truth, Take 2, featuring new arrangements of the original pieces.

Jews and the Abstract Truth was the debut album by experimental klezmer band Hasidic New Wave (whose members included improvisers trumpeter Frank London and saxophonist Greg Wall), released on Knitting Factory in 1996.

== Track listing ==
All tracks composed by Oliver Nelson.

Side one
No.	Title	Order of solos	Length
1.	"Stolen Moments"	Hubbard, Dolphy, Nelson, Evans	8:47
2.	"Hoe-Down"	Hubbard, Dolphy, Nelson, Haynes	4:43
3.	"Cascades"	Hubbard, Evans	5:32

Side two
No.	Title	Order of solos	Length
1.	"Yearnin'"	Dolphy, Hubbard, Evans	6:24
2.	"Butch and Butch"	Nelson, Hubbard, Dolphy, Evans	4:35
3.	"Teenie's Blues"	Dolphy, Nelson, Evans, Chambers	6:33

== Personnel ==
- Freddie Hubbard – trumpet
- Eric Dolphy – alto saxophone; flute
- Oliver Nelson – tenor saxophone; alto saxophone on "Teenie's Blues"
- George Barrow – baritone saxophone
- Bill Evans – piano
- Paul Chambers – bass
- Roy Haynes – drums

=== Production ===
- Rudy Van Gelder – recording engineer
- Chuck Stewart – photography
- Pete Turner – cover design

== Charts ==
Chart performance for The Blues and the Abstract Truth
Chart (2021)	Peak position
German Albums (Offizielle Top 100)	52
Swiss Albums (Schweizer Hitparade)	74
US Top Jazz Albums (Billboard)	7
