= Chuck Stewart =

American photographer (1927–2017)

- Born: Charles Hugh Stewart; May 21, 1927; Henrietta, Texas
- Died: January 20, 2017 (aged 89); Teaneck, New Jersey
- Education: Ohio University
- Known for: Fine Art Photographer Jazz Photographer
- Spouse: Mae Bailey
- Children: Marsha; David; Christopher
- Parents: Hugh Paris Stewart (father); Anne Harris (mother)

Charles Stewart (May 21, 1927 – January 20, 2017) was an American photographer best known for his portraits of jazz singers and musicians such as Louis Armstrong, Count Basie, John Coltrane, Ella Fitzgerald, Earl Hines, and Miles Davis, as well as artists in the R&B and salsa genres. Stewart's photographs have graced more than 2,000 album covers.

== Early life ==
Stewart was born in Henrietta, Texas, and grew up in Tucson, Arizona. His father, Hugh Paris Stewart, was a chef while his mother, Anne Harris, was a domestic worker. He received a Kodak Brownie camera as a present when he was 13 years old and used it that same day to take photos of Marian Anderson, who had come to visit his school Dunbar. After they were developed, he was able to sell his photos for two dollars, making him a professional photographer from his first day he took pictures. Stewart attended and graduated from Tucson Senior High School May 1945. He attended Ohio University as a photography major, one of the only two universities in the United States that offered the program at the collegiate level and the only one that would then accept African American students. He graduated from Ohio University with a BFA degree in 1948. He graduated in 1949, was drafted into the Army and worked as a military photographer, photographing atomic bomb tests in 1952.

== Career ==
While in college, his friendship with photographer Herman Leonard helped him make connections with record companies in New York City. His clients would include Impulse, Mercury, Reprise and Verve, for whom he took cover photos of artists such jazz and R&B icons as Louis Armstrong, Count Basie, Ray Charles, Miles Davis, Ella Fitzgerald, Lionel Hampton, Rahsaan Roland Kirk, Charles Mingus, Max Roach, Sonny Rollins, Sarah Vaughan and Dinah Washington. He also shot exercise guru Bonnie Prudden's debut album cover Keep Fit | Be Happy. His work appeared on more than 2,000 albums and in publications including Esquire, Paris Match and The New York Times, as well as in the Encyclopedia of Jazz by jazz journalist Leonard Feather. He also worked for Chess Records in Chicago (and its Argo subsidiary).

Stewart always tried to capture his subjects in as flattering a pose as possible, saying "I didn't want them picking their nose or scratching their behind. It was important to me that I take a picture of a person in a manner that I thought they looked best." During the 1950s and 1960s he was turned down for more lucrative advertising photography when agencies said that their clients "don't have black people down here sweeping the floors" and would rather resign the account than accept him.

In conjunction with Stewart's recognition with the Milt Hinton Award for Excellence in Jazz Photography, Jazz at Lincoln Center presented an exhibition titled Looking at the Music: The Jazz Photography of Chuck Stewart, which ran from November 2008 to February 2009. In 2014, 25 of Stewart's photographs documenting the recording of John Coltrane's A Love Supreme were inducted into the Smithsonian.

== Death ==
A widowed father of three children and daughter-in-law Kim Stewart, Stewart lived in Teaneck, New Jersey, from 1965 in a home furnished with carpeting and fixtures that he received from some of his photography assignments. Despite having a piano in his home, Stewart remarked that he himself "couldn't play Chopsticks", even after years of lessons. He died in Teaneck on January 20, 2017, at age 89.
