= Arthur Edghill =

American drummer (1926–2024)

- Born: Clifford Arthur Edghill; July 21, 1926; Brooklyn, New York, U.S.
- Died: September 10, 2024 (aged 98) Brooklyn, New York, U.S.
- Genres: Jazz, hard bop
- Occupation: Drummer
- Instrument: Drums
- Years active: 1948–1970s

Clifford Arthur Edghill Jr. (July 21, 1926 – September 10, 2024) was an American hard bop jazz drummer active in the 1950s, 1960s and 1970s, appearing on several of the Prestige recordings recorded at the successive Van Gelder Studios, in Hackensack and Englewood Cliffs, including Mal Waldron's debut album, Mal-1 (1956), but especially with Eddie "Lockjaw" Davis and Shirley Scott.

== Life and career ==
Edghill was born in Brooklyn, New York, on July 21, 1926. His first professional work was touring with Mercer Ellington in 1948, and in 1953 he toured with Ben Webster. He played with Kenny Dorham's Jazz Prophets in 1956 and with Gigi Gryce and in 1957-58 toured with Dinah Washington.

He was a member of Eddie "Lockjaw" Davis' quartet with George Duvivier and/or Wendell Marshall, and Shirley Scott, and appears on several of Scott's recordings, including her debut album, Great Scott! (1958), as well as on Very Saxy (1959), featuring Eddie "Lockjaw" Davis, Buddy Tate, Coleman Hawkins, and Arnett Cobb on tenors, an album recorded shortly after Blow Arnett, Blow (1959).

As well as appearing on recordings with the above line-ups, he also played in quartets led by Horace Silver, including one featuring Cecil Payne, in 1954, and at Minton's with Hank Mobley and Doug Watkins, a line-up that also jammed on one occasion with Charlie Parker and Annie Laurie.

Edghill died in Orlando, Florida, on September 10, 2024, at the age of 98.

== Discography ==
With Mildred Anderson

- Person to Person (Bluesville, 1960)

With David Amram

- No More Walls (1971)

With Arnett Cobb

- Blow Arnett, Blow (1959)

With Eddie "Lockjaw" Davis

- Eddie Davis Trio Featuring Shirley Scott, Organ (Roulette, 1958)
- The Eddie Davis Trio Featuring Shirley Scott (Roost, 1958)
- Smokin' (1958)
- The Eddie "Lockjaw" Davis Cookbook (1958)
- Jaws (1958)
- The Eddie "Lockjaw" Davis Cookbook, Vol. 2 (1958)
- The Eddie "Lockjaw" Davis Cookbook Volume 3 (1958)
- Very Saxy (1959)
- Jaws in Orbit (1959)
- Bacalao (1959)
- Moodsville Volume 4 (1960)
- Misty (1963)

With Kenny Dorham

- 'Round About Midnight at the Cafe Bohemia (1956)
- Kenny Dorham and the Jazz Prophets, Vol. 1 (1956)

With Little Jimmy Scott

- If You Only Knew (1955)

With Shirley Scott

- Great Scott! (1958)
- Scottie (1958)
- Shirley's Sounds (recorded 1958, released 1961)
- Shirley Scott Plays Horace Silver (1959)
- Scottie Plays the Duke (1959)
- Soul Searching (1959)
- Moodsville Volume 5 (1960)
- Like Cozy (1960)
- Soul Sister (1960)
- Now's the Time (recorded 1958–1964, released 1967)
- Workin' (1967)
- Stompin' (1967)

With Al Smith

- Hear My Blues (Bluesville, 1959)

With Mal Waldron

- Mal-1 (1956)
