= Jaws in Orbit =

Studio album by Eddie "Lockjaw" Davis with Shirley Scott
- Released: 1959
- Recorded: May 1, 1959
- Studio: Van Gelder Studio, Hackensack, NJ
- Genre: Jazz
- Length: 35:04
- Label: Prestige; PRLP 7171
- Producer: Esmond Edwards

Eddie "Lockjaw" Davis chronology
Very Saxy (1959)	Jaws in Orbit (1959)	Hear My Blues (1959)

Shirley Scott chronology
Scottie Plays the Duke (1959)	Jaws in Orbit (1959)	Soul Searching (1959)

Jaws in Orbit is an album by saxophonist Eddie "Lockjaw" Davis with organist Shirley Scott, recorded in 1959 for the Prestige label.

== Reception ==
Professional ratings
Review scores
Source	Rating
AllMusic	3/5 stars
DownBeat	2/5 stars
The Penguin Guide to Jazz Recordings	3/4 stars

The AllMusic review by Scott Yanow states: "The group that Eddie "Lockjaw" Davis led with organist Shirley Scott during the latter half of the 1950s was quite accessible and did a great deal to popularize the organ band in jazz."

== Track listing ==
All compositions by Eddie "Lockjaw" Davis except as indicated

1. "Intermission Riff" (Ray Wetzel) - 6:24
2. "Can't Get Out of This Mood" (Frank Loesser, Jimmy McHugh) - 5:24
3. "Foxy" - 5:52
4. "Our Delight" (Tadd Dameron) - 6:21
5. "Bahia" (Ary Barroso) - 7:29
6. "Bingo Domingo" - 5:56

== Personnel ==
- Eddie "Lockjaw" Davis - tenor saxophone
- Shirley Scott - organ
- Steve Pulliam - trombone
- George Duvivier - bass
- Arthur Edgehill - drums
