= The Eddie "Lockjaw" Davis Cookbook =

Studio album by Eddie "Lockjaw" Davis with Shirley Scott and Jerome Richardson
- Released: 1958
- Recorded: June 20, 1958; Van Gelder Studio, Hackensack, NJ
- Genre: Jazz
- Label: Prestige; PRLP 7141
- Producer: Esmond Edwards

Eddie "Lockjaw" Davis chronology
Count Basie Presents Eddie Davis Trio + Joe Newman (1957)	The Eddie "Lockjaw" Davis Cookbook (1958)	Jaws (1958)

Shirley Scott chronology
Great Scott! (1958)	The Eddie "Lockjaw" Davis Cookbook (1958)	Scottie (1958)

Professional ratings
Review scores
Source	Rating
Allmusic	3.5/5 stars
The Rolling Stone Jazz Record Guide	4/5 stars
The Penguin Guide to Jazz Recordings	3.5/4 stars

The Eddie "Lockjaw" Davis Cookbook is an album by saxophonist Eddie "Lockjaw" Davis with organist Shirley Scott and flautist Jerome Richardson recorded in 1958 for the Prestige label. The album was later issued as Vol. 1 when two subsequent "Cookbook" volumes were released.

== Reception ==
The Allmusic review stated: "The music on this 1958 date holds few surprises; it's meat and potatoes all the way, but it's made using the choicest ingredients".

== Track listing ==
All compositions by Eddie "Lockjaw" Davis except as indicated

1. "Have Horn, Will Blow" - 5:11
2. "The Chef" - 5:59
3. "But Beautiful" (Jimmy Van Heusen, Johnny Burke) - 7:40
4. "In the Kitchen" (Johnny Hodges) - 12:53
5. "Three Deuces" - 4:58
6. "Avalon" (Buddy DeSylva, Al Jolson, Vincent Rose) - 3:32 Bonus track on CD reissue

== Personnel ==
- Eddie "Lockjaw" Davis - tenor saxophone
- Shirley Scott - organ
- Jerome Richardson - flute (tracks 1–4), tenor saxophone (track 5)
- George Duvivier - bass
- Arthur Edgehill - drums
