= Eddie "Lockjaw" Davis with Shirley Scott =

Album by Eddie "Lockjaw" Davis

Studio album by Eddie "Lockjaw" Davis with Shirley Scott
- Released: 1960
- Recorded: January 31, 1960; Van Gelder Studio, Englewood Cliffs
- Genre: Jazz
- Labels: Moodsville; MV 4
- Producer: Esmond Edwards

Eddie "Lockjaw" Davis chronology
Person to Person (1960)	Eddie "Lockjaw" Davis with Shirley Scott (1960)	Misty (1960)

Shirley Scott chronology
Bacalao (1959)	Eddie "Lockjaw" Davis with Shirley Scott (1960)	Shirley's Sounds (1958-60)

Professional ratings
Review scores
Source	Rating
Allmusic	3/5 stars

Eddie "Lockjaw" Davis with Shirley Scott (also referred to as Moodsville Volume 4) is an album by saxophonist Eddie "Lockjaw" Davis with pianist Shirley Scott recorded in 1960 and released on the Moodsville label.

== Reception ==
AllMusic awarded the album 3 stars.

== Track listing ==
1. "Serenade In Blue" (Mack Gordon, Harry Warren) - 4:14
2. "It Could Happen to You" (Johnny Burke, Jimmy Van Heusen) - 5:41
3. "What's New?" (Burke, Bob Haggart) - 3:52
4. "I Cover the Waterfront" (Johnny Green, Edward Heyman) - 5:34
5. "The Man I Love" (George Gershwin, Ira Gershwin) - 4:18
6. "Smoke Gets in Your Eyes" (Otto Harbach, Jerome Kern) - 4:28
7. "The Very Thought of You" (Ray Noble) - 6:22
8. "Man With a Horn" (Eddie DeLange, Jack Jenney, Bonnie Lake) - 5:27

== Personnel ==
- Eddie "Lockjaw" Davis - tenor saxophone
- Shirley Scott - piano, no organ on this album
- George Duvivier - bass
- Arthur Edgehill - drums
