= Workin' (Shirley Scott album) =

Studio album by Shirley Scott
- Released: July 1967
- Recorded: May 27, 1958 (#1, 4); Van Gelder Studio, Hackensack; April 8, 1960 (#2–3); March 24, 1961 (#5–6)
- Studios: Van Gelder Studio, Englewood Cliffs, NJ
- Genre: Jazz
- Length: 35:03
- Labels: Prestige; PRLP 7424
- Producers: Bob Weinstock (#1, 4); Esmond Edwards (#2–3, 5–6)

Shirley Scott chronology
Satin Doll (1961)	Workin' (1967)	Stompin' (1960–61)

Professional ratings
Review scores
Source	Rating
Allmusic	3/5 stars
The Penguin Guide to Jazz Recordings	3/4 stars

Workin' is a studio album by organist Shirley Scott recorded for Prestige, released in 1967 as PRLP 7424.

== Track listing ==
1. "Miles' Theme" - 3:05
2. "Autumn Leaves" (Prevert, Mercer, Kosma) - 5:39
3. "Bridge Blue" (Scott) - 5:30
4. "Slaughter on 10th Avenue" (Rodgers) - 3:37
5. "Work Song" (Nat Adderley) - 6:52
6. "Chapped Chops" (Scott) - 10:30

== Personnel ==
Tracks 1, 4

- Shirley Scott - organ
- George Duvivier - bass
- Arthur Edgehill - drums

Tracks 2–3

- Shirley Scott - organ
- George Tucker - bass
- Arthur Edgehill - drums

Tracks 5–6

- Shirley Scott - organ
- Ronnell Bright - piano
- Wally Richardson - guitar
- Peck Morrison - bass
- Roy Haynes - drums
