= Chauncey "Lord" Westbrook =

- Born: 21 October 1921; Jacksonville, Florida
- Died: 6 November 2006 (aged 85) Philadelphia, Pennsylvania
- Genres: Jazz, soul
- Occupation: Musician
- Instrument: Guitar
- Label: Prestige

Chauncey (also Chauncy) Leon Westbrook (October 21, 1921 – November 2, 2006), known professionally as Chauncey "Lord" Westbrook, was an American jazz guitarist.

Westbrook worked with Rex Stewart, Buddy Johnson (1953–57), Aretha Franklin, Charlie Rouse, Little Willie John, Ernestine Allen, Little Jimmy Scott, and Sammy Davis Jr. He was a member of The Orioles in the early 1950s.

In 1956 he recorded his solo album Get Out of Town for Morty Craft's newly acquired Melba Records. He was a session musician on Aretha Franklin’s first Columbia recording, Aretha: With The Ray Bryant Combo.

== Discography ==
=== As leader ===
- 1956: Get Out of Town (Melba Records LP)

=== As sideman ===
- 1955: "Rock 'n' Roll" – Buddy Johnson (Mercury)
- 1956: "Please Say You're Mine" b/w "With All My Heart" - Jimmy Jones with Warren Lucky, Kelly Owens, Leonard Gaskin, Panama Francis
- 1956: "Just Leave It to Me" b/w "Is It Too Soon" - Debutantes (Savoy 1191)
- 1957: Walkin' - Buddy Johnson & His Orchestra
- 1958: "I May Never" b/w "What" - Jimmy Scott
- 1958: "Everybody Stroll" b/w "Sone Down" - The O.C. All Stars
- 1958: "Ophelia" b/w "Hot Calypso" - The O.C. All Stars
- 1958: Swinging Like Tate - Buddy Tate with Buck Clayton, Dicky Wells, Earl Warren, Skip Hall, Lord Westbrook, Aaron Bell, Jo Jones.
- 1958: Henderson Homecoming – Rex Stewart (United Artists, 1959)
- 1959: "You Can't Do Me This Way" b/w "These Are the Things" - David Thorne - Haywood Henry, Ernie Hayes, Carl Lynch, Leonard Gaskin, Osie Johnson, David Thorne, Teacho Wiltshire
- 1960: No More in Life - Mildred Anderson
- 1960: The Happy Jazz of Rex Stewart - Rex Stewart Septet (Swingville, 2006)
- 1961: Shorty & Doc – Shorty Baker and Doc Cheatham
- 1961: Aretha: With The Ray Bryant Combo - Aretha Franklin and Ray Bryant
- 1961: Let It Roll - Ernestine Allen
- 1961: These Dues - Clea Bradford
- 1962: If You Need Me - Solomon Burke (Atlantic)
- 1963: Bossa Nova Bacchanal - Charlie Rouse
- 1964: Blues Around the Clock - Jimmy Witherspoon (Prestige)
