= The Look of Love (Stanley Turrentine album) =

Studio album by Stanley Turrentine
- Released: Mid August 1968
- Recorded: April 15, May 2, 13 & 27, 1968
- Studio: Van Gelder Studio, Englewood Cliffs, NJ
- Genre: Jazz
- Length: 37:12
- Label: Blue Note; BST 84286
- Producer: Duke Pearson

Stanley Turrentine chronology
The Return of the Prodigal Son (1967)	The Look of Love (1968)	Common Touch (1968)

The Look of Love is an album by jazz saxophonist Stanley Turrentine recorded for the Blue Note label in 1968 and arranged by Duke Pearson and Thad Jones.

== Reception ==
Professional ratings
Review scores
Source	Rating
AllMusic	4/5 stars

AllMusic awarded the album 4 stars with the review by Stephen Cook stating, "With his flexible phrasing and muscular tone, Turrentine dives into the lush arrangements... Purists who usually cringe at late-'60s jazz dates like this (yes, there is a Beatles cover here) might be pleasantly surprised. For those who feel Bacharach and Jimmy Webb provide fine material for jazz, then The Look of Love is a must".

== Track listing ==
1. "The Look of Love" (Burt Bacharach, Hal David) - 4:23
2. "Here, There and Everywhere" (John Lennon, Paul McCartney) - 3:26
3. "A Beautiful Friendship" (Donald Kahn, Stanley Styne) - 3:22
4. "Blues for Stan" (Turrentine) - 6:01
5. "This Guy's in Love With You" (Bacharach, David) - 2:34
6. "MacArthur Park" (Jimmy Webb) - 4:41
7. "I'm Always Drunk in San Francisco" (Tommy Wolf) - 2:25
8. "Emily" (Johnny Mandel, Johnny Mercer) - 3:14
9. "Cabin in the Sky" (Vernon Duke, John La Touche) - 3:43
10. "Smile" (Charlie Chaplin) - 3:23

Recorded on April 15, 1968 (1, 4, 10), May 2, 1968 (3, 5, 7–8) and May 13, 1968 (2, 6, 9), with string section overdubbed on May 27, 1968.

== Personnel ==
- Stanley Turrentine - tenor saxophone
- Jimmy Nottingham, Snooky Young - flugelhorn
- Benny Powell - bass trombone
- Jim Buffington - French horn
- Hank Jones - piano (tracks 3–5, 7, 8 & 10)
- Duke Pearson - piano (track 1), arranger (track 1–3 & 5–9)
- Roland Hanna - piano (tracks 2, 6 & 9)
- Kenny Burrell - guitar
- George Duvivier - bass
- Grady Tate - drums (tracks 1, 3–5, 7, 8 & 10)
- Mickey Roker - drums (tracks 2, 6 & 9)
- Thad Jones - arranger (tracks 4 & 10)
