= Stompin' =

Studio album by Shirley Scott
- Released: 1967
- Recorded: April 12, 1960 and March 24, 1961; Van Gelder Studio, Englewood Cliffs, New Jersey
- Genre: Jazz
- Label: Prestige; PR 7456
- Producer: Esmond Edwards

Shirley Scott chronology
Workin' (1958-61)	Stompin' (1967)	Hip Soul (1961)

Professional ratings
Review scores
Source	Rating
Allmusic	3/5 stars

Stompin' is an album by organist Shirley Scott recorded in 1961 (with one track from 1960) and released on the Prestige label in 1967.

== Reception ==
The Allmusic review awarded the album 3 stars.

== Track listing ==
1. "Stompin' at the Savoy" (Benny Goodman, Andy Razaf, Edgar Sampson, Chick Webb) - 4:56
2. "You're My Everything" (Mort Dixon, Harry Warren, Joe Young) - 5:50
3. "Trav'lin' Light" (Johnny Mercer, Jimmy Mundy, Trummy Young) - 5:39
4. "This Can't Be Love" (Lorenz Hart, Richard Rodgers) -
5. "From This Moment On" (Cole Porter) - 4:20
6. "Down by the Riverside" (Traditional) - 9:01
- Recorded at Van Gelder Studio in Englewood Cliffs, New Jersey on April 12, 1960 (track 5), March 24, 1961 (tracks 1–3 & 6), and November 15, 1962 (track 4).

== Personnel ==
- Shirley Scott - organ (tracks 1–3, 5, 6)
- Ronnell Bright - piano (tracks 1–3 & 6)
- Wally Richardson - guitar (tracks 1–3 & 6)
- Peck Morrison (tracks 1–3 & 6), Wendell Marshall (track 5) - bass
- Roy Haynes (tracks 1–3 & 6), Arthur Edgehill (track 5) - drums
- Ray Barretto - congas (track 5)
- Don Patterson - organ (track 4)
- Paul Weeden - guitar (track 4)
- Billy James - drums (track 4)
- Eddie "Lockjaw" Davis - tenor saxophone (tracks 4, 5)
