= Blue Seven =

Studio album by Shirley Scott
- Released: May 1966
- Recorded: August 22, 1961
- Studio: Van Gelder Studio, Englewood Cliffs
- Genre: Jazz, Blues
- Length: 36:40
- Label: Prestige; PRLP 7376
- Producer: Esmond Edwards

Shirley Scott chronology
Hip Soul (1961)	Blue Seven (1966)	Hip Twist (1961)

Professional ratings
Review scores
Source	Rating
Allmusic	4/5 stars

Blue Seven is a studio album by organist Shirley Scott recorded in 1961 for Prestige and issued in 1966 as PRLP 7376. It features performances by Oliver Nelson and Joe Newman, among the others.

== Track listing ==
1. "Blue Seven" (Sonny Rollins) – 6:45
2. "Don't Worry About It Baby, Here I Am" (Scott) – 6:40
3. "Nancy (With the Laughing Face)" (Phil Silvers, Jimmy Van Heusen) – 5:28
4. "Wagon Wheels" (DeRose, Hill) – 12:10
5. "Give Me the Simple Life" (Rube Bloom, Harry Ruby) – 5:37

Note

- The CD reissue in 2000 includes the bonus track "How Sweet" (Scott) - 7:37, that was originally released on the album Now's the Time (Prestige 7440). Same personnel and recording date. Its inclusion on CD presents the Blue Seven session in its entirely.

== Personnel ==
- Shirley Scott – organ
- Oliver Nelson – tenor saxophone
- Joe Newman – trumpet
- George Tucker – bass
- Roy Brooks – drums
