= Satin Doll (Shirley Scott album) =

Studio album by Shirley Scott
- Released: 1963
- Recorded: March 7, 1961
- Studio: Van Gelder Studio, Englewood Cliffs, NJ
- Genre: Jazz
- Label: Prestige; PRLP 7283
- Producer: Esmond Edwards

Shirley Scott chronology
Like Cozy (1960)	Satin Doll (1963)	Workin' (1958-61)

Professional ratings
Review scores
Source	Rating
Allmusic	3/5 stars

Satin Doll is an album by organist Shirley Scott recorded in 1961 and released on the Prestige label in 1963. It was Scott's second album of Duke Ellington compositions after Scottie Plays the Duke (1959).

== Reception ==
The Allmusic review stated "A bit more prim, though Scott still burns".

== Track listing ==
1. "Satin Doll" (Duke Ellington, Johnny Mercer, Billy Strayhorn)
2. "It Don't Mean a Thing (If It Ain't Got That Swing)" (Ellington, Irving Mills)
3. "C Jam Blues" (Barney Bigard, Ellington)
4. "Perdido" (Juan Tizol)
5. "Mood Indigo" (Bigard, Ellington, Mills)
6. "Things Ain't What They Used to Be" (Mercer Ellington, Ted Persons)
7. "Solitude" (Eddie DeLange, Ellington, Mills)

== Personnel ==
- Shirley Scott - organ
- George Tucker - bass
- Mack Simpkins - drums
