= Bacalao (album) =

Studio album by Eddie "Lockjaw" Davis with Shirley Scott
- Released: August 1960
- Recorded: December 20, 1959
- Studio: Van Gelder Studio, Englewood Cliffs
- Genre: Jazz
- Length: 43:26
- Label: Prestige; PRLP 7178
- Producer: Esmond Edwards

Eddie "Lockjaw" Davis chronology
The Red Garland Trio + Eddie "Lockjaw" Davis (1959)	Bacalao (1960)	Person to Person (1960)

Shirley Scott chronology
Soul Searching (1959)	Bacalao (1959)	Eddie "Lockjaw" Davis with Shirley Scott (1960)

Bacalao is an album by saxophonist Eddie "Lockjaw" Davis with organist Shirley Scott recorded in 1959 for the Prestige label.

== Reception ==
Professional ratings
Review scores
Source	Rating
Allmusic	4/5 stars
The Penguin Guide to Jazz Recordings	3/4 stars

The Allmusic review states, "Organ combo soul-jazz was still new and fresh in 1959, and Scott was helping Davis find new ways to interpret very familiar melodies. Although not quite essential, Bacalao is a rewarding example of Davis' ability to thrive in an organ/tenor setting".

== Track listing ==
1. "Last Train From Overbrook" (James Moody) – 5:07
2. "Sometimes I'm Happy" (Vincent Youmans, Irving Caesar) – 6:23
3. "That Old Black Magic" (Harold Arlen, Johnny Mercer) – 5:02
4. "Fast Spiral" (Davis) – 4:35
5. "Dobbin' with Redd Foxx" (Moody) – 5:29
6. "Come Rain or Come Shine" (Arlen, Mercer) – 4:54
7. "Dansero" (Lee Daniels, Richard Hayman, Sol Parker) – 5:33
8. "When Your Lover Has Gone" (Einar Aaron Swan) – 6:23

== Personnel ==
- Eddie "Lockjaw" Davis – tenor saxophone
- Shirley Scott – organ
- George Duvivier – bass
- Arthur Edgehill – drums
- Ray Barretto – bongos
- Luis Perez – bongos, congas
