= Ronnell Bright =

American jazz pianist (1930–2021)

- Born: Ronnell Lovelace Bright; July 3, 1930; Chicago, Illinois, U.S.
- Died: August 12, 2021 (aged 91)
- Genres: Jazz
- Occupation: Musician
- Instrument: Piano
- Years active: 1952–2021

Ronnell Lovelace Bright (July 3, 1930 – August 12, 2021) was an American jazz pianist. He made cameo appearances in the TV shows The Jeffersons and Sanford and Son, also working on The Carol Burnett Show.

== Career ==
Bright played piano from a young age and won a piano competition when he was nine years old. In 1944, he played with the Chicago Youth Piano Symphony Orchestra. He studied at Juilliard, graduating early in the 1950s. Moving back to Chicago, he played with Johnny Tate and accompanied Carmen McRae before moving to New York City in 1955. There he played with Rolf Kühn and assembled his own trio in 1957. In 1957–58 he was with Dizzy Gillespie and acted as an accompanist for Sarah Vaughan, Lena Horne, and Gloria Lynne over the next few years. His compositions were recorded by Vaughan, Cal Tjader, Horace Silver, and Blue Mitchell. In 1964, he became Nancy Wilson's arranger and pianist after moving to Los Angeles. Later in the decade he found work as a studio musician, playing in Supersax from 1972 to 1974. His composition "Sweet Pumpkin", originally recorded by Bill Henderson in 1959, has experienced a resurgence in popularity due to a recent cover version by vocalist Samara Joy.

== Discography ==
=== As leader ===
- Bright's Spot (Regent, 1957)
- Bright Flight (Vanguard, 1957)
- The Ronnell Bright Trio (Polydor, 1958)

=== As sideman ===
With Sarah Vaughan

- After Hours at the London House (Mercury, 1958)
- Vaughan and Violins (Mercury, 1958)
- No Count Sarah (Mercury, 1959)

With others

- Buddy Collette, Jazz for Thousand Oaks (UFO-BASS, 1996)
- Coleman Hawkins, The Hawk Relaxes (Moodsville/Prestige, 1961)
- Rolf Kühn, Streamline (Vanguard, 1956)
- Charles Kynard, Where It's At! (Pacific Jazz, 1963)
- Anita O'Day, A Song for You (Emily, 1984)
- Anita O'Day, I Get a Kick Out of You (Evidence, 1993)
- Johnnie Pate, The Johnnie Pate Trio (Talisman, 1956)
- Johnnie Pate, Subtle Sounds (GIG, 1956)
- Shirley Scott, Workin' (Prestige, 1967)
- Shirley Scott, Stompin' (Prestige, 1968)
- Supersax, Supersax Plays Bird (Capitol, 1973)
- Supersax, Salt Peanuts (Capitol, 1974)
- Buddy Tate, Groovin' with Buddy Tate (Swingville, 1961)
- Frank Wess & Harry Edison, Dear Mr. Basie (Concord Jazz, 1990)
