= The Shirley Scott Trio =

Album by Shirley Scott

Studio album by Shirley Scott
- Released: 1960
- Recorded: October 23, 1958 and April 8, 1960; Van Gelder Studio, Hackensack and Englewood Cliffs
- Genre: Jazz
- Label: Moodsville; MV 5
- Producer: Esmond Edwards

Shirley Scott chronology
Shirley's Sounds (1958-60)	The Shirley Scott Trio (1960)	Soul Sister (1960)

Professional ratings
Review scores
Source	Rating
Allmusic	3/5 stars

The Shirley Scott Trio (also referred to as Moodsville Volume 5) is an album by organist Shirley Scott recorded in 1960 and released on the Moodsville label. The album features a trio session from 1958 with Scott overdubbed on piano from the sessions that produced Scottie and another from 1960.

== Reception ==
The Allmusic review stated "These are mostly easygoing standards of the Rodgers-Hart variety (two of that team's songs are covered), and is too much on the sedate side to rate as one of her finest efforts".

== Track listing ==
1. "Sweet Lorraine" (Cliff Burwell, Mitchell Parish) - 4:31
2. "I Thought I'd Let You Know" (Cal Massey) - 4:20
3. "I Should Care" (Sammy Cahn, Axel Stordahl, Paul Weston) - 4:48
4. "Spring Is Here" (Lorenz Hart, Richard Rodgers) - 4:45
5. "I Didn't Know What Time It Was" (Hart, Rodgers) - 3:57
6. "Gee, Baby, Ain't I Good to You" (Andy Razaf, Don Redman) - 4:15
7. "Until the Real Thing Comes Along" (Sammy Cahn, Saul Chaplin, L. E. Freeman) - 5:09
8. "Lover Man" (Jimmy Davis, Roger "Ram" Ramirez, Jimmy Sherman) - 3:48
- Recorded at Van Gelder Studio in Hackensack, New Jersey on October 23, 1958 (tracks 1, 3, 6 & 7) and in Englewood Cliffs, New Jersey on April 8, 1960 (tracks 2, 4, 5 & 8)

== Personnel ==
- Shirley Scott - organ
- George Duvivier (tracks 1, 3, 6 & 7), George Tucker (tracks 2, 4, 5 & 8) - bass
- Arthur Edgehill - drums
