= Misty (Eddie "Lockjaw" Davis album) =

Studio album by Eddie "Lockjaw" Davis with Shirley Scott
- Released: 1963
- Recorded: December 4, 1959 & April 12, 1960
- Studio: Van Gelder Studio, Englewood Cliffs. NJ
- Genre: Jazz
- Label: Moodsville; MV 30
- Producer: Esmond Edwards

Eddie "Lockjaw" Davis chronology
Eddie "Lockjaw" Davis with Shirley Scott (1960)	Misty (1963)	Afro-Jaws (1960)

Shirley Scott chronology
Eddie "Lockjaw" Davis with Shirley Scott (1960)	Misty (1960)	Shirley's Sounds (1958-60)

Misty is an album by saxophonist Eddie "Lockjaw" Davis with organist Shirley Scott recorded in 1960 and released on the Moodsville label in 1963.

== Reception ==
Professional ratings
Review scores
Source	Rating
Allmusic	3/5 stars
Down Beat	4/5 stars

Allmusic awarded the album three stars.

== Track listing ==
1. "Oh-Oh" (Don Elliott, Alexander Burland) - 2:25
2. "Misty" (Erroll Garner, Johnny Burke) - 3:48
3. "Give Me a Kiss Goodnight" (Lee Morse) - 5:40
4. "The Moon of Manakoora" (Frank Loesser, Alfred Newman) - 7:02
5. "Just Friends" (John Klenner, Sam M. Lewis) - 6:15
6. "Speak Low" (Ogden Nash, Kurt Weill) - 6:51
7. "I Wished on the Moon" (Dorothy Parker, Ralph Rainger) - 5:00

== Personnel ==
- Eddie "Lockjaw" Davis - tenor saxophone
- Shirley Scott - organ
- George Duvivier (tracks 1 & 2), Wendell Marshall (tracks 3–7) - bass
- Arthur Edgehill - drums
- Ray Barretto - congas (tracks 2, 3 & 5–7)
