= No More in Life =

Studio album by Mildred Anderson
- Released: 1961
- Recorded: September 26, 1960
- Studio: Van Gelder Studio, Englewood Cliffs, NJ
- Genre: Jazz, blues
- Length: 38:10
- Label: Bluesville; BVLP 1017
- Producer: Ozzie Cadena

Mildred Anderson chronology
Person to Person (1960)	No More in Life (1961)

No More in Life is the second album by jazz vocalist Mildred Anderson recorded in 1960 and released on the Bluesville label early the following year.

== Reception ==
Professional ratings
Review scores
Source	Rating
AllMusic	3/5 stars
The Penguin Guide to Blues Recordings	2/4 stars

AllMusic reviewer Scott Yanow stated: "Considering how well she sings on this set, it is strange that Mildred Anderson would have no further opportunities to lead her own albums". Chris Smith, in The Penguin Guide to Blues Recordings described the album as "uneven", on the title track "her pitch and dynamics are erratic". Of one of the stronger tracks: "Oddly, given that Anderson can have problems even with harmonically straightforward material, "That Old Devil Called Love", an audacious attempt at Billie Holiday's style is quite appealing." Smith says the album is "not as inessential as Person to Person, her earlier Bluesville album.

== Track listing ==
All compositions by Mildred Anderson except where noted

1. "Everybody's Got Somebody But Me" – 5:33
2. "I Ain't Mad at You" (Count Basie, Milton Ebbins, Freddie Green) – 3:02
3. "Hard Times" (Esmond Edwards) – 4:12
4. "No More in Life" – 2:42
5. "Roll 'Em Pete" (Pete Johnson, Big Joe Turner) – 3:16
6. "What More Can a Woman Do" (Dave Barbour, Peggy Lee) – 2:41
7. "That Ole Devil Called Love" (Allan Roberts, Doris Fisher) – 3:45
8. "Mistreater" – 6:01
9. "I'm Lost" (Otis René) – 4:36

== Personnel ==
- Mildred Anderson – vocals
- Al Sears – tenor saxophone
- Robert Banks – organ
- Lord Westbrook – guitar
- Leonard Gaskin – bass
- Bobby Donaldson – drums
