= The Red Garland Trio + Eddie "Lockjaw" Davis =

Studio album by Red Garland
- Released: 1960
- Recorded: December 11, 1959
- Studio: Van Gelder Studio, Englewood Cliffs, NJ
- Genre: Jazz
- Length: 39:52
- Label: Moodsville; MVLP 1
- Producer: Esmond Edwards

Red Garland chronology
Red Garland Live! (1959)	The Red Garland Trio + Eddie "Lockjaw" Davis (1960)	Red Alone (1960)

Eddie "Lockjaw" Davis chronology
Hear My Blues (1959)	The Red Garland Trio + Eddie "Lockjaw" Davis (1959)	Bacalao (1959)

Professional ratings
Review scores
Source	Rating
Allmusic	3/5 stars
The Penguin Guide to Jazz Recordings	3/4 stars

The Red Garland Trio + Eddie "Lockjaw" Davis (also referred to as Moodsville Volume 1) is an album by pianist Red Garland featuring saxophonist Eddie "Lockjaw" Davis recorded in 1959 and released on the Moodsville label in 1960.

== Reception ==
The Allmusic review by Scott Yanow stated: "In the late 1950s, Prestige started a new subsidiary (Moodsville) that was designed to provide mood music for courting couples... Due to the overly relaxed nature of much of this music and the lack of variety, this is not one of the more essential Red Garland sets, but it is still generally enjoyable."

== Track listing ==
1. "We'll Be Together Again" (Carl T. Fischer, Frankie Lane) - 5:40
2. "Stella by Starlight" (Ned Washington, Victor Young) - 4:27
3. "I Heard You Cried Last Night" (Ted Grouya) - 4:51
4. "Softly Baby" (Red Garland) - 5:59
5. "When Your Lover Has Gone" (Einar Aaron Swan) - 5:57
6. "Wonder Why" (Nicholas Brodzsky, Sammy Cahn) - 4:27
7. "The Blue Room" (Lorenz Hart, Richard Rodgers) - 5:47
8. "The Red Blues" (Red Garland) - 3:05

== Personnel ==
- Red Garland - piano
- Eddie "Lockjaw" Davis - tenor saxophone (tracks 1, 4 & 5)
- Sam Jones - bass
- Art Taylor - drums
