= Alan Copeland =

American singer, songwriter, and composer (1926–2022)

Alan Copeland (born Allan Robert Copeland; October 6, 1926 – December 28, 2022), also known as Weaver Copeland, was an American singer, songwriter, composer, and conductor.

== Life and career ==
Copeland was born in Los Angeles, California on October 6, 1926.

Copeland was a member of The Modernaires, first from 1948 to 1956 and then from 1959 to the mid-1960s. He also worked as a songwriter in Los Angeles in the 1950s. He co-wrote the song "Make Love to Me", "Back Where I Belong", "Darling, Darling, Darling", "High Society", "Into the Shadows", "This Must Be the Place", "Too Young to Know", and "While the Vesper Bells Were Ringing". He also worked as a composer for television and did arrangement work for musicians such as Ella Fitzgerald, Frank Sinatra, and Bing Crosby. He also provided lyrics for such jazz instrumentals as Horace Silver's "Nica's Dream" and Clare Fischer's "Gaviota."

Copeland led studio ensembles that released several albums in the 1960s. In 1968, he issued the single, "Mission: Impossible Theme / Norwegian Wood", interpolating the "Theme from Mission: Impossible" and the Beatles song "Norwegian Wood" in what might be termed a proto-mashup. (Note: In her 2014 essay, "When Pop Stars Collide: Mashups As Musical Destiny," Assistant Professor of Music Theory Christina Boone of Indiana State University states that this "was probably the earliest example of pop songs being heard at the same time, overlaid on top of one another," while also noting that it cannot literally be termed a mashup since it employed no pre-recorded music but rather Copeland's own newly recorded arrangements of the two compositions.) It peaked at number 120 on the Billboard Bubbling Under chart and won a Grammy Award for Best Contemporary Pop Performance by a Chorus. In 1980, in collaboration with his wife, fellow vocalist Mahmu Pearl, Copeland formed the band Feathers, which released at least three LPs and one CD compilation.

In November 2007, Copeland published his autobiography, Jukebox Saturday Nights.

== Personal life and death ==
From November 5, 1948 until their divorce in January 1969, Copeland was married to Dolores Mae Barty, the sister of actor/activist Billy Barty. They had three children: Christine, Richard and Michael.

Copeland was married to Joyce Abbott Ross—née Manor, a.k.a. Mahmu Pearl—from July 22, 1971 until her death on December 22, 2009.

On December 28, 2022, at the age of 96, Copeland died at Sonora Senior Living in Jamestown, California, survived by his son Richard Copeland, daughter-in-law Linda, granddaughter Rachel and grandson Samuel. Also a stepdaughter, singer Sheila Ross.

== Discography ==
- No Sad Songs for Me (Coral, 1957)
- Cool Country (ABC, 1966)
- A Bubble Called You (ABC, 1967)
- If Love Comes With It (A&M, 1969)
- Enchanting Woodwinds, disc no. 6 of Reader's Digest Association's 6-LP set, Music in the Night (RCA, 1974)

=== Collaborative work ===
- With Count Basie:
  - Basie Swingin' Voices Singin' (ABC-Paramount, 1966)
- As member of The Modernaires. Recordings beginning in the 1950s, after spinning off from the Glenn Miller Orchestra.
