= On a Clear Day (Shirley Scott album) =

Studio album by Shirley Scott
- Released: 1966
- Recorded: January 6, 1966
- Genre: Jazz
- Length: 38:51
- Label: Impulse!
- Producer: Bob Thiele

Shirley Scott chronology
Latin Shadows (1965)	On a Clear Day (1966)	Roll 'Em: Shirley Scott Plays the Big Bands (1966)

On a Clear Day is an album by American jazz organist Shirley Scott recorded in 1966 for the Impulse! label.

== Reception ==
The Allmusic review by Scott Yanow awarded the album 4 stars stating "The music grooves and Scott shows that she did not need a competing horn in order to come up with soulful and swinging ideas".

Professional ratings
Review scores
Source	Rating
Allmusic	4/5 stars

== Track listing ==
1. "On a Clear Day (You Can See Forever)" (Burton Lane, Alan Jay Lerner) - 4:48
2. "What'll I Do?" (Irving Berlin) - 4:34
3. "Cold Winter Blues" (Shirley Scott) - 3:48
4. "All Alone" (Berlin) - 4:45
5. "What the World Needs Now Is Love" (Burt Bacharach, Hal David) - 3:58
6. "Corcovado" (Antonio Carlos Jobim) - 5:23
7. "Days of Wine and Roses" (Henry Mancini, Johnny Mercer) - 5:20
8. "Instant Blues" (Scott) - 6:15

- Recorded in New York City on January 6, 1966

== Personnel ==
- Shirley Scott — organ
- Ron Carter - bass
- Jimmy Cobb - drums
