= Afro-Jaws =

Studio album by Eddie "Lockjaw" Davis
- Released: 1961
- Recorded: May 4 & 12, 1960; New York City
- Genre: Jazz
- Length: 39:00
- Label: Riverside; RLP 373
- Producer: Orrin Keepnews

Eddie "Lockjaw" Davis chronology
Misty (1960)	Afro-Jaws (1961)	Battle Stations (1960)

Afro-Jaws is an album by saxophonist Eddie "Lockjaw" Davis recorded in 1961 and released on the Riverside label.

== Reception ==
Professional ratings
Review scores
Source	Rating
Allmusic	4/5 stars
The Penguin Guide to Jazz Recordings	2.5/4 stars

The Allmusic site awarded the album four stars with the review by Scott Yanow stating, "The Afro-Cuban setting is perfect for the tough-toned tenor, who romps through the infectious tunes".

== Track listing ==
All compositions by Gil Lopez except as indicated

1. "Wild Rice" - 4:53
2. "Guanco Lament" - 5:18
3. "Tin Tin Deo" (Gil Fuller, Chano Pozo) - 5:10
4. "Jazz-A-Samba" - 4:14
5. "Alma Alegre" - 5:24
6. "Star Eyes" (Gene de Paul, Don Raye) - 6:20
7. "Afro-Jaws" (Eddie "Lockjaw" Davis) - 7:36

== Personnel ==
- Eddie "Lockjaw" Davis - tenor saxophone
- Clark Terry - flugelhorn, trumpet
- John Ballo (tracks 3 & 4), Ernie Royal, Phil Sunkel - trumpet
- Lloyd Mayers - piano
- Larry Gales - bass
- Ben Riley - drums
- Ray Barretto - congas, bongos
- Gil Lopez - arranger
