= Eddie Davis Trio Featuring Shirley Scott, Organ =

Studio album by Eddie Davis Trio featuring Shirley Scott
- Released: 1959
- Recorded: March 1958; New York City
- Genre: Jazz
- Label: Roulette; R/SR 52019
- Producer: Teddy Reig

Eddie Davis chronology
Count Basie Presents Eddie Davis Trio + Joe Newman (1957)	Eddie Davis Trio Featuring Shirley Scott, Organ (1959)	The Eddie Davis Trio Featuring Shirley Scott (1958)

Eddie Davis Trio Featuring Shirley Scott, Organ is an album by saxophonist Eddie "Lockjaw" Davis' Trio with Shirley Scott recorded in 1958 and originally released on the Roulette label.

== Track listing ==
1. "Close Your Eyes" (Bernice Petkere) - 2:31
2. "Canadian Sunset" (Eddie Heywood, Norman Gimbel) - 4:15
3. "Just One More Chance" (Sam Coslow, Arthur Johnston) - 2:58
4. "Night and Day" (Cole Porter) - 3:26
5. "Snowfall" (Claude Thornhill) - 2:18
6. "Afternoon in a Doghouse" (Eddie Davis) - 3:21
7. "A Gal in Calico" (Arthur Schwartz) - 3:39
8. "(Where Are You) Now That I Need You" (Frank Loesser) - 2:36
9. "This Time the Dream's on Me" (Harold Arlen, Johnny Mercer) - 3:01
10. "There Is No Greater Love" (Isham Jones Marty Symes) - 2:51
11. "What Is There to Say" (Vernon Duke, Yip Harburg) - 2:27
12. "Fine and Dandy" (Kay Swift, Paul James) - 3:10

== Personnel ==
- Eddie "Lockjaw" Davis - tenor saxophone
- Shirley Scott - organ
- George Duvivier - bass
- Arthur Edgehill - drums
