= Happy Talk (album) =

Studio album by Shirley Scott
- Released: 1963
- Recorded: December 5, 1962
- Studio: Van Gelder Studio, Englewood Cliffs, NJ
- Genre: Jazz
- Length: 34:30
- Label: Prestige; PRLP 7262
- Producer: Ozzie Cadena

Shirley Scott chronology
Shirley Scott Plays Horace Silver (1961)	Happy Talk (1963)	The Soul Is Willing (1963)

Professional ratings
Review scores
Source	Rating
Allmusic	3/5 stars

Happy Talk (also issued as Sweet Soul) is an album by organist Shirley Scott recorded in 1962 and released on the Prestige label.

== Reception ==
The Allmusic review stated "It includes a nice "Jitterbug Waltz." All are standards".

== Track listing ==
1. "Happy Talk" (Oscar Hammerstein II, Richard Rodgers) - 8:40
2. "Jitterbug Waltz" (Fats Waller) - 5:40
3. "I Hear a Rhapsody" (Jack Baker, George Fragos, Dick Gasparre) - 4:50
4. "My Romance" (Lorenz Hart, Richard Rodgers) - 5:15
5. "Where or When" (Hart, Rodgers) - 4:50
6. "Sweet Slumber" (Lucky Millinder, Allen J. Neiburg, Henri Woode) - 5:15

== Personnel ==
- Shirley Scott - organ
- Earl May - bass
- Roy Brooks - drums
