= Mal-1 =

Studio album by Mal Waldron
- Released: May 1957
- Recorded: November 9, 1956
- Genre: Jazz
- Length: 37:48
- Label: Prestige
- Producer: Bob Weinstock

Mal Waldron chronology
Mal-1 (1957)	Mal/2 (1957)

Mal-1 is the debut album by the jazz pianist and composer Mal Waldron. It was released through Prestige Records in May 1957. It was recorded in November 1956.

== Reception ==
Professional ratings
Review scores
Source	Rating
AllMusic	4/5 stars
The Penguin Guide to Jazz	3/4 stars

A contemporaneous review by John S. Wilson stated that trumpeter Idrees Sulieman and alto saxophonist Gigi Gryce "play unusually well while Waldron contributes several provocative compositions and arrangements (especially a version of 'Yesterdays' that is a remarkably interesting rewriting of a real warhorse) and plays with typically dark, warm charm". The AllMusic review by Jim Todd stated, "Mal Waldron's recording debut as a leader presents the pianist with his many gifts already well developed".

== Track listing ==
1. "Stablemates" (Benny Golson) – 4:51
2. "Yesterdays" (Otto Harbach, Jerome Kern) – 7:47
3. "Transfiguration" (Lee Sears = Gigi Gryce) – 7:17
4. "Bud Study" – 5:48 (Mal Waldron)
5. "Dee's Dilemma" – 6:58 (Mal Waldron)
6. "Shome" (Idrees Sulieman) – 5:07

- Recorded at Van Gelder Studio in Hackensack, New Jersey, on November 9, 1956.

== Personnel ==
- Mal Waldron – piano
- Idrees Sulieman – trumpet
- Gigi Gryce – alto saxophone
- Julian Euell – bass
- Arthur Edgehill – drums
