= Like Cozy =

Studio album by Shirley Scott
- Released: 1960
- Recorded: September 27, 1960
- Studio: Van Gelder Studio, Englewood Cliffs, NJ
- Genre: Jazz
- Length: 35:59
- Label: Moodsville; MV 19
- Producer: Esmond Edwards

Shirley Scott chronology
Mucho, Mucho (1960)	Like Cozy (1960)	Satin Doll (1961)

Professional ratings
Review scores
Source	Rating
Allmusic	4/5 stars
The Penguin Guide to Jazz Recordings	3.5/4 stars

Like Cozy is an album by organist Shirley Scott recorded in 1960 and released on the Moodsville label.

== Reception ==
The Allmusic review stated "The groove of the recordings heard on Like Cozy is what we've come to expect from Ms. Scott, late-night smooth groove that was heavy on ballads, medium bounce standards, and melodic interplay between leader and sidemen -- a trademark specialty of the label".

== Track listing ==
1. "Like Cozy" (Shirley Scott) - 4:10
2. "Little Girl Blue" (Lorenz Hart, Richard Rodgers) - 4:59
3. "Laura" (Johnny Mercer, David Raksin) - 5:00
4. "You Do Something to Me" (Cole Porter) - 5:17
5. "Once in a While" (Michael Edwards, Bud Green) - 4:31
6. "'Deed I Do" (Walter Hirsch, Fred Rose) - 4:11
7. "More Than You Know" (Edward Eliscu, Billy Rose, Vincent Youmans) - 4:05
8. "My Heart Stood Still" (Hart, Rodgers) - 3:46

== Personnel ==
- Shirley Scott - organ, piano
- George Duvivier - bass
- Arthur Edgehill - drums
