= Mucho, Mucho =

Studio album by Shirley Scott
- Released: 1960
- Recorded: July 8, 1960
- Studio: Van Gelder Studio, Englewood Cliffs, NJ
- Genre: Jazz
- Length: 43:52
- Label: Prestige; PRLP 7182
- Producer: Esmond Edwards

Shirley Scott chronology
Soul Sister (1960)	Mucho, Mucho (1960)	Like Cozy (1960)

Professional ratings
Review scores
Source	Rating
Allmusic	3/5 stars

Mucho, Mucho is a Latin-oriented jazz album by organist Shirley Scott recorded and released in 1960 on Prestige Records as PRLP 7182.

== Track listing ==
1. "The Lady Is a Tramp" (Hart, Rodgers) – 9:41
2. "Muy Azul" (Scott) – 7:27
3. "I Get a Kick Out of You" (Porter) – 3:57
4. "Walkin'" (Carpenter) – 3:44
5. "Tell Me" (Scott) – 4:48
6. "Mucho, Mucho" (Scott) – 14:15

== Personnel ==
- Shirley Scott – organ
- Gene Casey – piano
- Bill Ellington – bass
- Phil Diaz – bongos
- Manny Ramos – timbales
- Juan Amalbert – congas
