= Very Saxy =

1959 Jazz studio album

Studio album by Eddie "Lockjaw" Davis with Buddy Tate, Coleman Hawkins and Arnett Cobb
- Released: 1959
- Recorded: April 29, 1959; Van Gelder Studio, Hackensack
- Genre: Jazz
- Length: 38:27
- Label: Prestige; PR 7167
- Producer: Esmond Edwards

Eddie "Lockjaw" Davis chronology
Blow Arnett, Blow (1959)	Very Saxy (1959)	Jaws in Orbit (1959)

Buddy Tate chronology
Swinging Like Tate (1958)	Very Saxy (1959)	Tate's Date (1959)

Professional ratings
Review scores
Source	Rating
Penguin Guide to Jazz	4/4 stars
Allmusic	4/5 stars
The Rolling Stone Jazz Record Guide	3/5 stars

Very Saxy is an album by saxophonist Eddie "Lockjaw" Davis with Buddy Tate, Coleman Hawkins and Arnett Cobb recorded in 1959 for the Prestige label.

== Reception ==
The Penguin Guide to Jazz selected the album as part of its suggested Core Collection. The Allmusic review awarded the album 4 stars and stated: "a historic and hard-swinging jam session... the four tenors battle it out and the results are quite exciting".

== Track listing ==
All compositions by Eddie "Lockjaw" Davis and George Duvivier except as indicated

1. "Very Saxy" - 8:18
2. "Lester Leaps In" (Lester Young) - 6:15
3. "Fourmost" (Shirley Scott) - 5:22
4. "Foot Pattin'" (Duvivier) - 8:53
5. "Light and Lovely" - 9:55

== Personnel ==
- Eddie "Lockjaw" Davis - tenor saxophone
- Buddy Tate - tenor saxophone
- Coleman Hawkins - tenor saxophone
- Arnett Cobb - tenor saxophone
- Shirley Scott - organ
- George Duvivier - bass
- Arthur Edgehill - drums
