= Common Touch =

Studio album by Stanley Turrentine featuring Shirley Scott
- Released: September 1969
- Recorded: August 30, 1968
- Studios: Van Gelder Studio, Englewood Cliffs, NJ
- Genre: Jazz
- Length: 39:30 original LP
- Labels: Blue Note; BST 84315
- Producer: Francis Wolff

Stanley Turrentine chronology
The Look of Love (1968)	Common Touch (1969)	Always Something There (1968)

Shirley Scott chronology
Girl Talk (1967)	Common Touch (1968)	Soul Song (1968)

Common Touch is an album by jazz saxophonist Stanley Turrentine featuring Shirley Scott recorded for the Blue Note label in 1968 and performed by Turrentine with Shirley Scott, Jimmy Ponder, Bob Cranshaw and Leo Morris. The CD reissue added one bonus track recorded in a different session and originally released on Ain't No Way (LT 1095, 1980). The other four tracks may be found on the CD reissue of Easy Walker.

== Reception ==
Professional ratings
Review scores
Source	Rating
Allmusic	3/5 stars

The Allmusic review by Scott Yanow, awarded the album 3 stars and states "Although not essential (no one seems to sweat much and none of the tempos are above a slow-medium pace), this lazy date has its pleasurable moments".

== Track listing ==
All compositions by Stanley Turrentine except as noted

1. "Buster Brown" - 5:25
2. "Blowin' in the Wind" (Bob Dylan) - 5:55
3. "Lonely Avenue" (Doc Pomus) - 8:07
4. "Boogaloo" (Shirley Scott) - 6:25
5. "Common Touch" - 6:21
6. "Living Through It All" - 7:17
7. "Ain't No Way" (Carolyn Franklin) - 11:03 Bonus track on CD

Recorded on May 10, 1968 (7) and August 30, 1968 (1-6).

== Personnel ==
- Stanley Turrentine - tenor saxophone
- Shirley Scott - organ
- Jimmy Ponder - guitar
- Bob Cranshaw - electric bass
- Leo Morris - drums (tracks 1–6)
- Ray Lucas - drums (track 7)
