= Hip Twist =

Studio album by Shirley Scott
- Released: 1962
- Recorded: November 17, 1961
- Studio: Van Gelder Studio, Englewood Cliffs, NJ
- Genre: Jazz
- Length: 37:46
- Label: Prestige; PR 7226
- Producer: Esmond Edwards

Shirley Scott chronology
Blue Seven (1961)	Hip Twist (1962)	Shirley Scott Plays Horace Silver (1961)

Professional ratings
Review scores
Source	Rating
Allmusic	4/5 stars
New Record Mirror	3/5 stars

Hip Twist is an album by organist Shirley Scott featuring saxophonist Stanley Turrentine which was recorded in 1961 and released on the Prestige label.

== Reception ==
The Allmusic review stated " Hip Twist, like nearly all of the Shirley Scott and Stanley Turrentine albums, is an underappreciated gem".

== Track listing ==
All compositions by Shirley Scott except as indicated

1. "Hip Twist" (Stanley Turrentine) - 5:17
2. "At Last" (Mack Gordon, Harry Warren) - 5:25
3. "Rippin' an' Runnin'" - 5:19
4. "The Very Thought of You" (Ray Noble) - 3:46
5. "Violent Blues"- 6:11
6. "That's All" (Bob Haymes, Alan Brandt) - 6:16
7. "All Tore Down" (Michael Edwards) - 5:32

== Personnel ==
- Shirley Scott - organ
- Stanley Turrentine - tenor saxophone
- George Tucker - bass
- Otis Finch - drums
