= The Eddie Davis Trio Featuring Shirley Scott =

Eddie Davis Trio Featuring Shirley Scott

Studio album by Eddie Davis Trio featuring Shirley Scott
- Released: 1959
- Recorded: May 1958; New York City
- Genre: Jazz
- Label: Roulette; RST-2227
- Producer: Teddy Reig

Eddie Davis chronology
Eddie Davis Trio Featuring Shirley Scott, Organ (1958)	Eddie Davis Trio Featuring Shirley Scott (1959)	Uptown (1958)

Eddie Davis Trio Featuring Shirley Scott is an album by saxophonist Eddie "Lockjaw" Davis' Trio with Shirley Scott recorded in 1958 and originally released on the Roost label.

== Track listing ==
1. "Day by Day" (Axel Stordahl, Paul Weston, Sammy Cahn) - 4:03
2. "Do Nothing till You Hear from Me" (Duke Ellington, Bob Russell) - 3:49
3. "I Remember You" (Victor Schertzinger, Johnny Mercer) - 4:11
4. "Land of Dreams" (Eddie Heywood) - 4:14
5. "Scotty" (Eddie Davis) - 3:46
6. "On the Street Where You Live" (Frederick Loewe, Alan Jay Lerner) - 3:33
7. "Dee Dee's Dance" (Denzil Best) - 3:00
8. "Don't Get Around Much Anymore" (Ellington, Russell) - 2:44
9. "Everything I Have Is Yours" (Burton Lane, Harold Adamson) - 3:47
10. "Don't Worry 'bout Me" (Rube Bloom, Ted Koehler) - 4:07
11. "Autumn in New York" (Vernon Duke) - 3:15
12. "Penthouse Serenade" Val Burton, Will Jason) - 2:46

== Personnel ==
- Eddie "Lockjaw" Davis - tenor saxophone
- Shirley Scott - organ
- George Duvivier - bass
- Arthur Edgehill - drums
