= Something (Shirley Scott album) =

Studio album by Shirley Scott
- Released: 1970
- Recorded: February 24, 25 & 26, 1970; Atlantic Studios, New York City
- Genre: Jazz
- Length: 33:04
- Label: Atlantic; SD 1561
- Producer: Joel Dorn

Shirley Scott chronology
Shirley Scott & the Soul Saxes (1969)	Something (1970)	Mystical Lady (1971)

Something is an album by organist Shirley Scott recorded in 1970 and released on the Atlantic label. It includes instrumental covers of several contemporary hits from artists such as the Beatles and the Jackson 5, along with the original song "Messie Bessie".

== Track listing ==
1. "Games People Play (Joe South) – 3:52
2. "Because" (John Lennon, Paul McCartney) – 3:46
3. "Can I Change My Mind" (Barry Despenza, Carl Wolfolk) – 2:57
4. "Someday We'll Be Together" (Jackey Beavers, Johnny Bristol, Harvey Fuqua) – 3:04
5. "Something" (George Harrison) – 3:28
6. "I Want You Back" (Berry Gordy, Alphonso Mizell, Freddie Perren, Deke Richards) – 2:41
7. "Messie Bessie" (Shirley Scott) – 4:18
8. "Brand New Me" (Theresa Bell, Jerry Butler, Kenny Gamble) – 4:10
- Recorded at Atlantic Studios in New York City on February 24 (tracks 2, 3 & 5), February 25 (tracks 1, 6 & 8) and February 26 (tracks 4 & 7), 1970

== Personnel ==
- Shirley Scott – organ, ondioline
- Billy Butler, Eric Gale – guitar
- Chuck Rainey – electric bass
- Jimmy Johnson – drums
- Ralph MacDonald – congas (tracks 1, 6 & 8)
