= The Eddie "Lockjaw" Davis Cookbook, Vol. 2 =

The Eddie "Lockjaw" Davis Cookbook Vol. 2

Studio album by Eddie "Lockjaw" Davis with Shirley Scott and Jerome Richardson
- Released: 1959
- Recorded: December 5, 1958
- Studio: Van Gelder Studio (Hackensack)
- Genre: Jazz
- Length: 39:09
- Label: Prestige; PRLP 7161
- Producer: Esmond Edwards

Eddie "Lockjaw" Davis chronology
Jaws (1959)	The Eddie "Lockjaw" Davis Cookbook Vol. 2 (1959)	The Eddie "Lockjaw" Davis Cookbook Volume 3 (1960)

Shirley Scott chronology
Scottie (1959)	The Eddie "Lockjaw" Davis Cookbook, Vol. 2 (1959)	The Eddie "Lockjaw" Davis Cookbook Volume 3 (1960)

Professional ratings
Review scores
Source	Rating
Allmusic	3/5 stars
DownBeat	3/5 stars
The Penguin Guide to Jazz Recordings	3.5/4 stars

The Eddie "Lockjaw" Davis Cookbook, Vol. 2 is an album by saxophonist Eddie "Lockjaw" Davis with organist Shirley Scott and flautist Jerome Richardson recorded in 1958 for the Prestige label. The album was the second of Davis' popular "Cookbook" volumes to be released.

== Reception ==
The Allmusic review awarded the album 3 stars and stated "this set, true to its name, really cooks".

== Track listing ==
All compositions by Eddie "Lockjaw" Davis and Shirley Scott except as indicated

1. "The Rev"- 9:00
2. "Stardust" (Hoagy Carmichael, Mitchell Parish) - 6:40
3. "Skillet" - 8:30
4. "I Surrender Dear" (Harry Barris, Gordon Clifford) - 5:25
5. "The Broilers" - 4:58
6. "Willow Weep for Me" (Ann Ronell) - 4:36 Bonus track on CD reissue

== Personnel ==
- Eddie "Lockjaw" Davis - tenor saxophone
- Shirley Scott - organ
- Jerome Richardson - flute (tracks 1–5)
- George Duvivier - bass
- Arthur Edgehill - drums
