= Great Scott! (1958 Shirley Scott album) =

Studio album by Shirley Scott
- Released: 1959
- Recorded: May 23, 1958; Van Gelder Studio, Hackensack
- Genre: Jazz
- Length: 51:36
- Label: Prestige; PR 7143
- Producer: Bob Weinstock

Shirley Scott chronology
Great Scott! (1959)	The Eddie "Lockjaw" Davis Cookbook (1958)

Professional ratings
Review scores
Source	Rating
Allmusic	3/5 stars

Great Scott! is the debut album by organist Shirley Scott recorded in 1958 for the Prestige label.

== Reception ==
The Allmusic review stated "Great Scott! was her first out-front contribution to popularizing the organ in a jazz format that also drew on parts of blues and soul music. She displays admirable command of the instrument's swoops and funky glows here".

== Track listing ==
1. "Brazil" (Ary Barroso) - 2:26
2. "The Scott" (Shirley Scott) - 3:05
3. "Cherokee" (Ray Noble) - 5:19
4. "Nothing Ever Changes My Love for You" (Marvin Fisher, Jack Segal) - 4:36
5. "Trees" (Joyce Kilmer, Oscar Rasbach) - 6:57
6. "All of You" (Cole Porter) - 3:20
7. "Goodbye" (Gordon Jenkins) - 5:00
8. "Four" (Miles Davis) - 3:53

== Personnel ==
- Shirley Scott - organ
- George Duvivier - bass
- Arthur Edgehill - drums
