= Travelin' Light (Shirley Scott & Kenny Burrell album) =

Studio album by Shirley Scott and Kenny Burrell
- Released: 1964
- Recorded: February 17, 1964
- Studio: Van Gelder Studio, Englewood Cliffs, NJ
- Genre: Jazz
- Length: 33:35
- Label: Prestige; PRLP 7305
- Producer: Ozzie Cadena

Shirley Scott chronology
Soul Shoutin' (1963)	Travelin' Light (1964)	Now's the Time (1958-64)

Kenny Burrell chronology
Blue Bash! (1963)	Travelin' Light (1964)	Soul Call (1964)

Professional ratings
Review scores
Source	Rating
Allmusic	3/5 stars

Travelin' Light is an album by organist Shirley Scott and guitarist Kenny Burrell recorded in 1964 and released on the Prestige label.

== Reception ==
The Allmusic site awarded the album 3 stars stating "It's Sunday morning soul-jazz, and such is the languor and even keel of most of the tunes".

== Track listing ==
1. "Trav'lin' Light" (Johnny Mercer, Jimmy Mundy, Trummy Young) - 4:44
2. "Solar" (Miles Davis) - 6:05
3. "Nice 'n' Easy" (Marilyn Bergman, Larry Keith, Lew Spence) - 4:36
4. "Stormy Monday" (T-Bone Walker) - 11:11
5. "Baby, It's Cold Outside" (Frank Loesser) - 3:53
6. "The Kerry Dance" (James Lynam Molloy) - 3:06

== Personnel ==
- Shirley Scott - organ
- Kenny Burrell - guitar
- Eddie Khan - bass
- Otis Finch - drums
