= Latin Shadows =

Studio album by Shirley Scott
- Released: 1965
- Recorded: July 21 & 22, 1965
- Genre: Jazz
- Label: Impulse!
- Producer: Bob Thiele

Shirley Scott chronology
Queen of the Organ (1964)	Latin Shadows (1965)	On a Clear Day (1965)

Latin Shadows is an album by American Jazz organist Shirley Scott recorded in 1965 for the Impulse! label.

== Reception ==
The Allmusic review awarded the album 3 stars.

Professional ratings
Review scores
Source	Rating
Allmusic	3/5 stars

== Track listing ==
1. "Latin Shadows" (Gary McFarland) – 3:13
2. "Downtown" (Tony Hatch) – 3:19
3. "Who Can I Turn To (When Nobody Needs Me)" (Leslie Bricusse, Anthony Newley) – 2:38
4. "Can't Get Over the Bossa Nova" (Eydie Gorme, Steve Lawrence) – 2:43
5. "This Love of Mine" (Sol Parker, Hank Sanicola, Frank Sinatra) – 3:23
6. "Perhaps, Perhaps, Perhaps (Quizás, Quizás, Quizás)" (Osvaldo Farrés) – 2:38
7. "Soul Sauce" (Dizzy Gillespie, Chano Pozo) – 2:50
8. "Hanky Panky" (McFarland) – 4:17
9. "Noche Azúl" (Shirley Scott) – 2:47
10. "Dreamsville" (Ray Evans, Jay Livingston, Henry Mancini) – 3:15
11. "Feeling Good" (Bricusse, Newley) – 3:36

- Recorded in New York City on July 21, 1965 (tracks 2, 4, 5 & 8–10) and July 21, 1965 (tracks 1, 3, 6, 7 & 11), 1964

== Personnel ==
- Shirley Scott — organ, vocals
- Gary McFarland – vibes, arranger, conductor
- Jerome Richardson – flute (tracks 1, 3, 6, 7 & 11)
- Harry Cykman, Arnold Eidus, Leo Kruczek, Charles Libove, Aaron Rosand – violin (tracks 1, 3, 6, 7 & 11)
- Charles McCracken, Edgardo Sodero, Joseph Tekula – cello (tracks 1, 3, 6, 7 & 11)
- Jimmy Raney – guitar
- Bob Cranshaw (tracks 2, 4, 5 & 8–10), Richard Davis (tracks 1, 3, 6, 7 & 11) – bass
- Mel Lewis – drums
- Willie Rodriguez – percussion
