= Lean on Me (album) =

Studio album by Shirley Scott
- Released: 1972
- Recorded: 1972
- Studios: Sound Exchange Studio, New York City, NY
- Genre: Jazz
- Length: 52:32
- Labels: Cadet; CA 50025
- Producer: Esmond Edwards

Shirley Scott chronology
Mystical Lady (1971)	Lean on Me (1972)	Queen Talk: Live at the Left Bank (2023)

Lean on Me is an album by organist Shirley Scott. It was recorded in 1972 and released on the Cadet label.

== Track listing ==
All compositions by Shirley Scott except as indicated

1. "Lean On Me" (Bill Withers) - 4:50
2. "Royal Love" - 5:10
3. "Smile" (Charlie Chaplin, Geoffrey Parsons, John Turner) - 5:34
4. "Funky Blues" - 8:33
5. "By The Time I Get To Phoenix" (Jimmy Webb) - 8:29
6. "How Insensitive" (Antônio Carlos Jobim, Norman Gimbel) - 8:54
7. "You Can't Mess Around With Love" - 5:54
8. "Carla's Dance" - 5:08

== Personnel ==
- Shirley Scott - organ
- J. Daniel Turner - flute, alto saxophone
- George Coleman - tenor saxophone
- Roland Prince - guitar
- Idris Muhammad - drums
