= Hear My Blues =

Studio album by Al Smith
- Released: 1960
- Recorded: September 20, 1959
- Studio: Van Gelder Studio, Englewood Cliffs, NJ
- Genre: Jazz
- Length: 32:35
- Label: Bluesville; BVLP 1001
- Producer: Esmond Edwards

Al Smith chronology
| Hear My Blues (1960) | Midnight Special (1961) |

Eddie "Lockjaw" Davis chronology
| Jaws in Orbit (1959) | Hear My Blues (1960) | The Red Garland Trio + Eddie "Lockjaw" Davis (1960) |

Hear My Blues (subtitled Eddie "Lockjaw" Davis Showcases Al Smith) is the debut album by jazz/blues vocalist Al Smith featuring saxophonist Eddie "Lockjaw" Davis' working group with organist Shirley Scott recorded in 1959 and becoming the first release on the Bluesville label. The album was reissued as Blues Shout! under Eddie "Lockjaw" Davis's name on Prestige in 1964.

== Reception ==
Professional ratings
Review scores
| Source | Rating |
|---|---|
| AllMusic | 4.5/5 stars |
| DownBeat | 3/5 stars |

AllMusic reviewer Alex Henderson stated: "Both of Smith's Bluesville albums are well worth owning, but if you had to pick one of the two, Hear My Blues would the best starting point".

== Track listing ==
All compositions by Al Smith except where noted

1. "Night Time Is the Right Time" (Unknown) – 4:16
2. "Pledging My Love" (Don Robey, Ferdinand Washington) – 2:28
3. "I've Got a Girl" – 4:32
4. "I'll Be Alright" – 3:51
5. "Come On, Pretty Baby" – 2:55
6. "Tears in My Eyes" – 5:58
7. "Never Let Me Go" (Joe Scott) – 5:11
8. "I've Got the Right Kind of Lovin'" – 3:24

== Personnel ==
- Al Smith – vocals
- Eddie "Lockjaw" Davis – tenor saxophone
- Shirley Scott – organ
- Wendell Marshall – bass
- Arthur Edgehill – drums
