= Girl Talk (Shirley Scott album) =

Studio album by Shirley Scott
- Released: 1967
- Recorded: January 12 & 13, 1967
- Genre: Jazz
- Length: 34:32
- Label: Impulse!
- Producer: Bob Thiele

Shirley Scott chronology
Soul Duo (1966)	Girl Talk (1967)	Common Touch (1968)

Girl Talk is an album by American jazz organist Shirley Scott recorded in 1967 for the Impulse! label.

== Reception ==
The Allmusic review by Michael G. Nastos described it as "A bit sweet".

Professional ratings
Review scores
Source	Rating
Allmusic	3/5 stars

== Track listing ==
1. "Girl Talk" (Neil Hefti, Bobby Troup) - 4:55
2. "Come Back To Me" (Burton Lane, Alan Jay Lerner) - 3:07
3. "We'll Be Together Again" (Carl T. Fischer, Frankie Laine) - 3:40
4. "Love Nest" (Louis Hirsch, Otto Harbach) - 3:13
5. "Swingin' the Blues" (Count Basie, Ed Durham) - 3:55
6. "Keep The Faith, Baby" (Shirley Scott) - 3:45
7. "Chicago, My Kind of Town" (Jimmy Van Heusen, Sammy Cahn) - 4:45
8. "On The Trail (From "Grand Canyon Suite")" (Ferde Grofé) - 3:42
9. "You're A Sweetheart" (Jimmy McHugh, Harold Adamson) - 3:30

- Recorded at Capitol Studios in New York City on January 12, 1967 (tracks 2, 3, 5 & 8) and August 22, 1966 (tracks 1, 4, 6 & 7)

== Personnel ==
- Shirley Scott — organ
- George Duvivier - bass
- Mickey Roker - drums
