= Mystical Lady =

Studio album by Shirley Scott
- Released: 1971
- Recorded: 1971
- Studio: Sound Exchange, New York City
- Genre: Jazz
- Length: 39:25
- Label: Cadet; CA 50009
- Producer: Esmond Edwards

Shirley Scott chronology
Something (1970)	Mystical Lady (1971)	Lean on Me (1972)

Mystical Lady is an album by organist Shirley Scott recorded in 1971 and released on the Cadet label.

== Reception ==
Professional ratings
Review scores
Source	Rating
Allmusic	3/5 stars

The Allmusic site awarded the album 3 stars.

== Track listing ==
1. "Hall of Jazz" (Shirley Scott, Greg Hall) – 6:17
2. "Let It Be" (John Lennon, Paul McCartney) – 7:13
3. "Love Dreams" (George Patterson) – 5:00
4. "Proud Mary" (John Fogerty) – 6:31
5. "Mystical Lady" (Scott) – 8:32
6. "Your Song" (Elton John, Bernie Taupin) – 5:52

== Personnel ==
- Shirley Scott – organ, vocals
- George Patterson – alto saxophone, arranger
- Pee Wee Ellis (tracks 1 & 2), Danny Turner (tracks 3–6) – tenor saxophone
- George Freeman (tracks 1 & 2), Wally Richardson (tracks 3–6) – guitar
- Ron Carter (tracks 3–6), Richard Davis (tracks 1 & 2) – bass
- Bobby Durham (tracks 3–6), Freddie Waits (tracks 1 & 2) – drums
