= Smokin' (Eddie "Lockjaw" Davis album) =

Studio album by Eddie "Lockjaw" Davis with Shirley Scott
- Released: 1964
- Recorded: September 12 and December 5, 1958; Van Gelder Studio, Hackensack
- Genre: Jazz
- Length: 35:04
- Label: Prestige; PRLP 7301
- Producer: Esmond Edwards

Eddie "Lockjaw" Davis chronology
The Eddie "Lockjaw" Davis Cookbook Volume 3 (1958)	Smokin' (1964)	Blow Arnett, Blow (1959)

Shirley Scott chronology
The Eddie "Lockjaw" Davis Cookbook Volume 3 (1958)	Smokin' (1958)	Scottie Plays the Duke (1959)

Smokin′ is an album by saxophonist Eddie "Lockjaw" Davis with organist Shirley Scott recorded in 1958 for the Prestige label.

== Reception ==
Professional ratings
Review scores
Source	Rating
Allmusic	4/5 stars
The Penguin Guide to Jazz Recordings	3/4 stars

The Allmusic review by Scott Yanow states: "Together the group swings hard on basic originals, blues and an occasional ballad, showing why this type of accessible band was so popular during the era."

== Track listing ==
All compositions by Eddie "Lockjaw" Davis and Shirley Scott except as indicated

1. "High Fry" - 5:28
2. "Smoke This" - 5:01
3. "Pennies from Heaven" (Johnny Burke, Arthur Johnston) - 3:27
4. "Pots and Pans" - 6:13
5. "Jaws" - 3:38
6. "It's a Blue World" (George Forrest, Robert Wright) - 6:04
7. "Blue Lou" (Irving Mills, Edgar Sampson) - 5:13

== Personnel ==
- Eddie "Lockjaw" Davis - tenor saxophone
- Shirley Scott - organ
- Jerome Richardson - baritone saxophone (track 1), flute (track 2), tenor saxophone (track 5)
- George Duvivier - bass
- Arthur Edgehill - drums
