= Blow Arnett, Blow =

Studio album by Arnett Cobb and Eddie "Lockjaw" Davis
- Released: 1959
- Recorded: January 9, 1959
- Studios: Van Gelder Studio, Hackensack
- Genre: Jazz
- Length: 38:11
- Labels: Prestige; PRLP 7151
- Producer: Esmond Edwards

Arnett Cobb chronology
Arnett Blows for 1300 (1947)	Blow Arnett, Blow (1959)	Smooth Sailing (1959)

Eddie "Lockjaw" Davis chronology
Smokin' (1958)	Blow Arnett, Blow (1959)	Very Saxy (1959)

Professional ratings
Review scores
Source	Rating
Allmusic	4/5 stars

Blow Arnett, Blow (also rereleased as Go Power!!!) is an album by saxophonists Arnett Cobb and Eddie "Lockjaw" Davis recorded in 1959 for the Prestige label.

== Reception ==
The Allmusic review awarded the album 4 stars and stated "Arnett Cobb's debut for Prestige and his first recording as a leader in three years (due to a serious car accident in 1956) is an explosive affair. Cobb is matched up with fellow tough tenor Eddie "Lockjaw" Davis, and there are plenty of sparks set off by their encounter".

== Track listing ==
All compositions by Arnett Cobb except where noted.

1. "When I Grow Too Old to Dream" (Oscar Hammerstein II, Sigmund Romberg) – 6:41
2. "Go Power" (George Duvivier) – 5:05
3. "Dutch Kitchen Bounce" – 7:00
4. "Go Red Go" – 5:39
5. "The Eely One" – 8:16
6. "The Fluke" (Wild Bill Davis) – 5:30

== Personnel ==
- Arnett Cobb, Eddie "Lockjaw" Davis – tenor saxophone
- Wild Bill Davis – organ
- George Duvivier – bass
- Arthur Edgehill – drums
