= Eddie "Lockjaw" Davis 4 – Montreux '77 =

Live album by Eddie "Lockjaw" Davis
- Released: 1977
- Recorded: July 15, 1977
- Genre: Jazz
- Length: 42:11
- Label: Pablo
- Producer: Norman Granz

Eddie "Lockjaw" Davis chronology
Light and Lovely (1977)	Eddie "Lockjaw" Davis 4 – Montreux '77 (1977)	Leapin' on Lenox (1978)

Professional ratings
Review scores
Source	Rating
Allmusic	3/5 stars
The Rolling Stone Jazz Record Guide	4/5 stars
The Penguin Guide to Jazz Recordings	3/4 stars

Eddie "Lockjaw" Davis 4 – Montreux '77 is a 1977 live album by Eddie "Lockjaw" Davis, recorded at the 1977 Montreux Jazz Festival in Montreux, Switzerland.

== Track listing ==
1. "This Can't Be Love" (Lorenz Hart, Richard Rodgers) – 5:49
2. "I Wished on the Moon" (Dorothy Parker, Ralph Rainger) – 7:04
3. "The Breeze and I" (Tutti Camarata, Ernesto Lecuona, Al Stillman) – 7:34
4. "Angel Eyes" (Earl Brent, Matt Dennis) – 6:02
5. "Telegraph" (Eddie "Lockjaw" Davis) – 6:00
6. "Land of Dreams" (Norman Gimbel, Eddie Heywood) – 7:19
7. "Blue Lou" (Irving Mills, Edgar Sampson) – 3:34

== Personnel ==
- Eddie "Lockjaw" Davis - tenor saxophone
- Oscar Peterson - piano
- Ray Brown - double bass
- Jimmie Smith - drums
