= Hip Soul =

Studio album by Shirley Scott
- Released: Late November 1961
- Recorded: June 2, 1961
- Studio: Van Gelder Studio, Englewood Cliffs, NJ
- Genre: Jazz
- Length: 39:39
- Label: Prestige; PRLP 7205
- Producer: Esmond Edwards

Shirley Scott chronology
Stompin' (1960-61)	Hip Soul (1961)	Blue Seven (1961)

Professional ratings
Review scores
Source	Rating
Allmusic	4/5 stars

Hip Soul is a studio album by organist Shirley Scott recorded in 1961 for Prestige and released the same year as PRLP 7205.

== Track listing ==
1. "Hip Soul" (Turrentine) – 6:31
2. "411 West" (Golson) – 6:33
3. "By Myself" (Dietz, Schwartz) – 5:59
4. "Trane's Blues" (Coltrane) – 4:56
5. "Stanley's Time" (Turrentine) – 4:22
6. "Out of This World" (Arlen, Mercer) – 11:18

== Personnel ==
- Shirley Scott – organ
- Stanley Turrentine (as Stan Turner) – tenor sax
- Herbie Lewis – bass
- Roy Brooks – drums
