= The Return of the Prodigal Son (album) =

Studio album by Stanley Turrentine
- Released: May 13, 2008
- Recorded: June 23, 1967 (#1–6); July 28, 1967 (#7–10)
- Studio: Van Gelder Studio, Englewood Cliffs, NJ
- Genre: Jazz
- Length: 58:50
- Label: Blue Note; Blue Note 17462
- Producer: Alfred Lion

Stanley Turrentine chronology
A Bluish Bag (1967)	The Return of the Prodigal Son (2008)	The Look of Love (1968)

The Return of the Prodigal Son is an album by jazz saxophonist Stanley Turrentine consisting of two sessions recorded for the Blue Note label in 1967 and arranged by Duke Pearson featuring McCoy Tyner.

Tracks 1, 4, 6 were originally issued on New Time Shuffle (1979, LT 993), along with tracks 1 and 3–5 from A Bluish Bag. Tracks 2–3 and 5 had previously been issued on the collection Stanley Turrentine (1975, BN-LA 394-2), whilst track 9 was released in 1995 on The Lost Grooves.

== Reception ==
Professional ratings
Review scores
Source	Rating
Allmusic	3.5/5 stars

The Allmusic review by Michael G. Nastos awarded the album 3½ stars and states "While hitting up a handful of the pop tunes of the day, Turrentine shows he is interested in and capable of tackling more modern compositions... this represents a prelude to the success that would deservedly come his way".

== Track listing ==
1. "Return of the Prodigal Son" (Harold Ousley) - 6:36
2. "Pres Delight" [aka "Flying Jumbo"] (Turrentine) - 7:06
3. "Bonita" (Gene Lees, Ray Gilbert, Antonio Carlos Jobim) - 6:10
4. "New Time Shuffle" (Joe Sample) - 5:55
5. "Better Luck Next Time" (Irving Berlin) - 5:18
6. "Ain't No Mountain High Enough" (Nickolas Ashford, Valerie Simpson) - 4:36
7. "Dr. Feelgood" (Aretha Franklin, Ted White) - 5:41
8. "The Look of Love" (Burt Bacharach, Hal David) - 6:02
9. "You Want Me to Stop Loving You" (Wild Bill Davis) - 5:28
10. "Dr. Feelgood" [Alternate Take] - 5:58

== Personnel ==
- Stanley Turrentine - tenor saxophone
- McCoy Tyner - piano
- Duke Pearson - organ, arranger
- Garnett Brown - trombone
- Joe Shepley, Marvin Stamm - trumpet, flugelhorn (tracks 1–6)
- Blue Mitchell - trumpet (tracks 7–10)
- Julian Priester - trombone (tracks 1–6)
- Al Gibbons - alto saxophone, flute, bass clarinet (tracks 1–6)
- James Spaulding - alto saxophone, flute (tracks 7–10)
- Joe Farrell - tenor saxophone, flute (tracks 1–6)
- Mario Rivera - baritone saxophone (tracks 1–6)
- Bob Cranshaw - bass
- Ray Lucas - drums
- Richard Landrum - congas, bongos, tambourine (tracks 7–10)

=== Production ===
- Alfred Lion - producer
- Rudy Van Gelder - engineer
