= Person to Person (Mildred Anderson album) =

Studio album by Mildred Anderson
- Released: 1960
- Recorded: January 22, 1960
- Studio: Van Gelder Studio, Englewood Cliffs, NJ
- Genre: Jazz
- Length: 30:24
- Label: Bluesville; BVLP 1004
- Producer: Esmond Edwards

Mildred Anderson chronology
Person to Person (1960)	No More in Life (1960)

Eddie "Lockjaw" Davis chronology
Bacalao (1959)	Person to Person (1960)	Eddie "Lockjaw" Davis with Shirley Scott (1960)

Person to Person is the debut album by jazz vocalist Mildred Anderson featuring saxophonist Eddie "Lockjaw" Davis' working group with organist Shirley Scott recorded in 1960 and released on the Bluesville label.

== Reception ==
Professional ratings
Review scores
Source	Rating
AllMusic	3/5 stars
The Penguin Guide to Blues Recordings	2/4 stars

AllMusic reviewer Scott Yanow stated: "this set is worth checking out if quite obscure". Chris Smith wrote in The Penguin Guide to Blues Recordings: "her pitch is sometimes uncertain and her interpretations are anonymous, neither sweet enough for ballads nor salty enough for blues."

== Track listing ==
1. "I'm Gettin' 'Long Alright" (Bobby Sharp, Charles Singleton) – 2:44
2. "I'm Free" (Singleton) – 4:57
3. "Don't Deceive Me (Please Don't Go)" (Chuck Willis) – 4:33
4. "Hello Little Boy" (Mildred Anderson) – 3:47
5. "Person to Person" (Wally Gold) – 3:07
6. "Cool Kind of Poppa" (Anderson) – 2:57
7. "Kidney Stew Blues" (Leona Blackman, Eddie "Cleanhead" Vinson) – 3:50
8. "I Didn't Have a Chance" (Curry) – 4:45

== Personnel ==
- Mildred Anderson – vocals
- Eddie "Lockjaw" Davis – tenor saxophone
- Shirley Scott – organ
- George Duvivier – bass
- Arthur Edgehill – drums
