= Soul Duo =

Studio album by Shirley Scott and Clark Terry
- Released: 1966
- Recorded: August 19 & 22, 1966
- Genre: Jazz
- Length: 36:22
- Label: Impulse!
- Producer: Bob Thiele

Shirley Scott chronology
Roll 'Em: Shirley Scott Plays the Big Bands (1966)	Soul Duo (1966)	Girl Talk (1967)

Soul Duo is an album by American jazz organist Shirley Scott and flugelhornist Clark Terry recorded in 1966 for the Impulse! label.

== Reception ==
The Allmusic review by Scott Yanow awarded the album 4 stars stating "This is one of organist Shirley Scott's lesser-known Impulse LPs ... Although not playing with the force that Stanley Turrentine exhibited when jamming with the organist, Clark Terry adds humor and a wistfulness to the date that easily compensates".

Professional ratings
Review scores
Source	Rating
Allmusic	4/5 stars

== Track listing ==
All compositions by Shirley Scott except as indicated

1. "Soul Duo" - 5:45
2. "Until I Met You (Corner Pocket)" (Freddie Green, Don Wolf) - 5:40
3. "This Light of Mine" - 3:30
4. "Joonji" (Clark Terry) - 3:51
5. "Clark Bars" (Terry) - 4:10
6. "Taj Mahal" - 4:00
7. "Up a Hair" - 4:59
8. "Heat Wave" (Irving Berlin) - 4:27

- Recorded at Olmstead Studio in New York City on August 19, 1966 (tracks 2, 3, 5 & 8) and August 22, 1966 (tracks 1, 4, 6 & 7)

== Personnel ==
- Shirley Scott — organ
- Clark Terry - flugelhorn (tracks 1–5, 7 & 8)
- Bob Cranshaw (tracks 1, 4, 6 & 7), George Duvivier (tracks 2, 3, 5 & 8) - bass
- Mickey Roker - drums
