= Soul Song (Shirley Scott album) =

Studio album by Shirley Scott
- Released: 1969
- Recorded: September 9 & 10 and November 6 & 7, 1968; Atlantic Studios and RCA Studios, New York City
- Genre: Jazz
- Length: 33:04
- Label: Atlantic; SD 1515
- Producer: Joel Dorn

Shirley Scott chronology
Common Touch (1968)	Soul Song (1969)	Shirley Scott & the Soul Saxes (1968)

Professional ratings
Review scores
Source	Rating
Allmusic	2/5 stars

Soul Song is an album by organist Shirley Scott recorded in 1968 and released on the Atlantic label.

== Reception ==
The Allmusic site awarded the album 2 stars stating "This collector's item has its interesting moments, but it is one of Shirley Scott's less significant dates".

== Track listing ==
1. "Think" (Lowman Pauling) - 8:06
2. "When a Man Loves a Woman" (Calvin Lewis, Andrew Wright) - 6:59
3. "Mr. Businessman" (Ray Stevens) - 3:12
4. "Blowin' in the Wind" (Bob Dylan) - 6:24
5. "Soul Song" (Shirley Scott) - 5:30
6. "Like a Lover" (Marilyn Bergman, Alan Bergman, Dori Caymmi, Nelson Motta) - 4:03
- Recorded at Atlantic Studios, New York City on September 9 (track 5) and September 10 (track 2) and at RCA Studios, New York City on November 6 (tracks 3 & 4) and November 7 (tracks 1 & 6), 1968

== Personnel ==
- Shirley Scott - organ
- Stanley Turrentine - tenor saxophone (tracks 1–5)
- Eric Gale - guitar (tracks 1, 2, 5 & 6)
- Bob Cranshaw (tracks 3 & 4), Roland Martinez (tracks 2 & 5), - electric bass
- Ray Lucas (tracks 3 & 4), Specs Powell (tracks 1 & 6), Bernard Purdie (tracks 2 & 5) - drums
