= Basie Swingin' Voices Singin' =

Studio album by Count Basie
- Released: 1966
- Recorded: June 20–22, 1966
- Genre: Jazz, vocal jazz
- Length: 48:28
- Label: ABC-Paramount
- Producer: Bob Thiele, Teddy Reig

Count Basie chronology
| Basie's Beatle Bag (1966) | Basie Swingin' Voices Singin' (1966) | Broadway Basie's...Way (1966) |

Professional ratings
Review scores
| Source | Rating |
|---|---|
| AllMusic | 4.5/5 stars |

'Basie Swingin' Voices Singin' is a 1966 album by Count Basie with the Alan Copeland singers.

It was issued in UK on His Master's Voice label. The single release "Happiness Is" reached #28 on Billboard's "Easy Listening" survey.

== Track listing ==
1. "Happiness Is" (Paul Parnes, Paul Evans)
2. "I Surrender Dear" (Gordon Clifford, Harry Barris)
3. "Oh, Lady Be Good!" (George Gershwin, Ira Gershwin)
4. "You Are My Sunshine" (Jimmie Davis, Charles Mitchell)
5. "Until I Met You" (Don Wolf, Freddie Green)
6. "Candy" (Mack David, Joan Whitney Kramer, Alex Kramer)
7. "Down by the Old Mill Stream" (Tell Taylor)
8. "Fantastic, That's You" (George Cates, Bob Thiele, Mort Green)
9. "One for My Baby (and One More for the Road)" (Harold Arlen, Johnny Mercer)
10. "Girl Talk" (Neal Hefti, Bobby Troup)
11. "Call Me" (Tony Hatch)

== Personnel ==
Performance

- The Alan Copeland singers - vocals
- Count Basie - piano
- Roy Eldridge - trumpet
- Al Grey - trombone
- Billy Byers
- Eddie "Lockjaw" Davis - tenor saxophone
- Freddie Green - guitar
- George Duvivier - double bass
- Ed Shaughnessy - drums

Production

- Bob Arnold - engineer
- Bob Thiele - producer
- Teddy Reig - producer
