= Roll 'Em: Shirley Scott Plays the Big Bands =

Studio album by Shirley Scott
- Released: August 1966
- Recorded: April 15 & 19, 1966
- Studio: Van Gelder Studio, Englewood Cliffs, NJ
- Genre: Jazz
- Length: 39:44
- Label: Impulse! A-9119
- Producer: Bob Thiele

Shirley Scott chronology
| On a Clear Day (1966) | Roll 'Em: Shirley Scott Plays the Big Bands (1966) | Soul Duo (1966) |

Roll 'Em: Shirley Scott Plays the Big Bands is an album by the American jazz organist Shirley Scott, recorded in 1966 for the Impulse! label.

== Reception ==
The AllMusic review by Scott Yanow awarded the album 3 stars, writing that "although nothing all that unexpected occurs, it is fun."

NPR, as part of its Take Five series, singled out the title track, writing: "Scott was powerful, especially for her size, but her style also employed control and subtlety, even when working with a large ensemble."

Professional ratings
Review scores
| Source | Rating |
|---|---|
| AllMusic | 3/5 stars |

== Track listing ==
1. "Roll 'Em" (Mary Lou Williams) - 4:08
2. "For Dancers Only" (Don Raye, Sy Oliver, Vic Schoen) - 3:43
3. "Sophisticated Swing" (William Hudson, Mitchell Parish) - 2:51
4. "Sometimes I'm Happy" (Irving Caesar, Vincent Youmans) - 3:54
5. "Little Brown Jug" (Joseph Winner) - 3:57
6. "Stompin' at the Savoy" (Edgar Sampson) - 3:57
7. "Ain't Misbehavin'" (Thomas "Fats" Waller, Harry Brooks, Andy Razaf) - 3:30
8. "A-Tisket, A-Tasket" (Van Alexander, Ella Fitzgerald) - 3:55
9. "Things Ain't What They Used to Be" (Mercer Ellington) - 5:19
10. "Tippin' In" (Robert Smith, Marty Symes) - 4:33

Recorded on April 15 (tracks 7–10) and April 19, 1966, (tracks 1–6).

== Personnel ==
- Shirley Scott - organ
- Oliver Nelson - arranger, conductor (tracks 1–4)
- Thad Jones, Joe Newman, Jimmy Nottingham, Ernie Royal, Clark Terry - trumpet (tracks 1–4)
- Quentin Jackson, Melba Liston, Tom McIntosh - trombone (tracks 1–4)
- Paul Faulise - bass trombone (tracks 1–4)
- Jerry Dodgion, Phil Woods - alto saxophone (tracks 1–4)
- Bob Ashton, Jerome Richardson - tenor saxophone (tracks 1–4)
- Danny Bank - baritone saxophone (tracks 1–4)
- Attila Zoller - guitar (tracks 1–4)
- Richard Davis (tracks 7–10), George Duvivier (tracks 1–6) - double bass
- Ed Shaughnessy (tracks 7–10), Grady Tate (tracks 1–6) - drums
