= All of Me (Eddie "Lockjaw" Davis album) =

Studio album by Eddie "Lockjaw" Davis Quartet
- Released: 1983
- Recorded: August 23, 1983
- Studio: Easy Sound Studio, Copenhagen, Denmark
- Genre: Jazz
- Length: 51:41 CD reissue with bonus tracks
- Label: SteepleChase; SCS 1181
- Producer: Nils Winther

Eddie "Lockjaw" Davis chronology
Live at the Widder (1982)	All of Me (1983)	Jazz at the Philharmonic 1983 (1983)

All of Me is an album by American jazz saxophonist Eddie "Lockjaw" Davis recorded in Copenhagen in 1983 and released on the Danish SteepleChase label.

== Critical reception ==
Professional ratings
Review scores
Source	Rating
Allmusic	4/5 stars

Allmusic called it "one of his very best" stating "Tenorman Eddie "Lockjaw" Davis had already been a potent force in jazz for 35 years when he recorded this set but as it turned out his SteepleChase date (his next-to-last session) was one of the strongest of his career ... Davis was at the peak of his powers during this recording.

== Track listing ==
1. "I Only Have Eyes for You" (Harry Warren, Al Dubin) – 5:35
2. "Ow!" (Dizzy Gillespie) – 5:40
3. "Funky Fluke" (Bennie Green) – 6:17
4. "There Is No Greater Love" (Isham Jones, Marty Symes) – 5:40
5. "All of Me" (Gerald Marks, Seymour Simons) – 6:04
6. "That's All" (Alan Brandt, Bob Haymes) – 4:29
7. "Comin' Home Baby" (Ben Tucker, Bob Dorough) – 6:41
8. "Four" (Eddie Vinson) – 5:48
9. "There Is No Greater Love" [take 1] (Jones, Symes) – 5:24 Bonus track on CD reissue

== Personnel ==
- Eddie "Lockjaw" Davis – tenor saxophone
- Kenny Drew – piano
- Jesper Lundgaard – bass
- Svend-Erik Nørregaard – drums
