= The Heavy Hitter =

Studio album by Eddie "Lockjaw" Davis
- Released: 1979
- Recorded: January 18, 1979
- Studio: CI Recording Studio, NYC
- Genre: Jazz
- Length: 36:55
- Label: Muse; MR 5202
- Producer: Michael Cuscuna

Eddie "Lockjaw" Davis chronology
Midnight Slows Vol. 10 (1978)	The Heavy Hitter (1979)	Jaw's Blues (1981)

The Heavy Hitter is an album by American jazz saxophonist Eddie "Lockjaw" Davis recorded in 1979 and released on the Muse label.

== Critical reception ==
Professional ratings
Review scores
Source	Rating
Allmusic	4/5 stars

Allmusic stated "Eddie "Lockjaw" Davis recorded many albums during the 15 years before his death in 1986; virtually all are recommended. This album is a little-known quartet set with pianist Albert Dailey, bassist George Duvivier and drummer Victor Lewis, Davis' only recording for Muse. Lockjaw had never worked with Dailey or Lewis before but they have little difficulty interpreting the tough-toned tenor's usual repertoire.

== Track listing ==
1. "When Your Lover Has Gone" (Einar Aaron Swan) – 4:33
2. "Just One of Those Things" (Cole Porter) – 4:16
3. "Medley: Old Folks/Out of Nowhere" (Dedette Lee Hill, Willard Robison/Johnny Green, Edward Heyman) – 8:24
4. "Secret Love" (Sammy Fain, Paul Francis Webster) – 5:39
5. "Comin' Home Baby" (Ben Tucker, Bob Dorough) – 6:01
6. "You Stepped Out of a Dream" (Nacio Herb Brown, Gus Kahn) – 3:04
7. "Jim Dog" (Gene Ammons) – 5:01

== Personnel ==
- Eddie "Lockjaw" Davis – tenor saxophone
- Albert Dailey – piano
- George Duvivier – bass
- Victor Lewis – drums
