= Soul Sister (Shirley Scott album) =

Studio album by Shirley Scott
- Released: 1966
- Recorded: June 23, 1960
- Studio: Van Gelder Studio, Englewood Cliffs, NJ
- Genre: Jazz
- Label: Prestige; PR 7392
- Producer: Esmond Edwards

Shirley Scott chronology
The Shirley Scott Trio (1958-60)	Soul Sister (1966)	Mucho, Mucho (1960)

Professional ratings
Review scores
Source	Rating
Allmusic	3/5 stars

Soul Sister is an album by organist Shirley Scott recorded in 1960 and released on the Prestige label in 1966.

== Reception ==
The Allmusic review stated "The one thing that makes this 1960 session stand out from much of Scott's other work is the prominence of Lem Winchester's vibes as the chief counterpoint to her organ".

== Track listing ==
1. "On Green Dolphin Street" (Bronislaw Kaper, Ned Washington) - 4:11
2. "Blues for Tyrone" (Shirley Scott) - 9:47
3. "Sonnymoon for Two" (Sonny Rollins) - 4:01
4. "Like Young" (André Previn) - 6:39
5. "The More I See You" (Mack Gordon, Harry Warren) - 6:21
6. "Get Me to the Church on Time" (Alan Jay Lerner Frederick Loewe) - 4:37

== Personnel ==
- Shirley Scott - organ
- Lem Winchester - vibraphone
- George Duvivier - bass
- Arthur Edgehill - drums
