= Jaws (album) =

Studio album by Eddie "Lockjaw" Davis and Shirley Scott
- Released: 1959
- Recorded: September 12, 1958; Van Gelder Studio, Hackensack
- Genre: Jazz
- Length: 36:20
- Label: Prestige; PRLP 7154
- Producer: Esmond Edwards

Eddie "Lockjaw" Davis chronology
The Eddie "Lockjaw" Davis Cookbook (1958)	Jaws (1959)	The Eddie "Lockjaw" Davis Cookbook, Vol. 2 (1958)

Shirley Scott chronology
The Eddie "Lockjaw" Davis Cookbook (1958)	Jaws (1958)	Scottie (1958)

Professional ratings
Review scores
Source	Rating
AllMusic	3/5 stars
The Penguin Guide to Jazz Recordings	3/4 stars

Jaws is an album by saxophonist Eddie "Lockjaw" Davis with organist Shirley Scott, recorded in 1958 for the Prestige label.

== Reception ==
The AllMusic review awarded the album 3 stars and stated: "It's a fine all-around showcase for the accessible group."

== Track listing ==
1. "I Let a Song Go Out of My Heart" (Duke Ellington, Irving Mills, Henry Nemo, John Redmond) - 5:19
2. "I'll Never Be The Same" (Gus Kahn, Matty Malneck, Frank Signorelli) - 4:44
3. "You Stepped Out of a Dream" (Nacio Herb Brown, Kahn) - 4:20
4. "Old Devil Moon" (E. Y. "Yip" Harburg, Burton Lane) - 4:26
5. "Too Close for Comfort" (Jerry Bock, Larry Holofcener, George David Weiss) - 4:18
6. "Body and Soul" (Frank Eyton, Johnny Green, Edward Heyman, Robert Sour) - 4:32
7. "But Not for Me" (George Gershwin, Ira Gershwin) - 4:10
8. "Tangerine" (Johnny Mercer, Victor Schertzinger) - 4:53

== Personnel ==
- Eddie "Lockjaw" Davis - tenor saxophone
- Shirley Scott - organ
- George Duvivier - bass
- Arthur Edgehill - drums
