= Shirley Scott & the Soul Saxes =

Studio album by Shirley Scott
- Released: 1969
- Recorded: September 10, 1968 and July 9 & 10, 1969
- Studio: Atlantic Studios and Regent Sound Studios, New York City
- Genre: Jazz
- Label: Atlantic; SD 1532
- Producer: Joel Dorn

Shirley Scott chronology
Soul Song (1968)	Shirley Scott & the Soul Saxes (1969)	Something (1970)

Professional ratings
Review scores
Source	Rating
Allmusic	4.5/5 stars

Shirley Scott & the Soul Saxes is an album by organist Shirley Scott recorded in 1969 and released on the Atlantic label.

== Reception ==
The Allmusic site awarded the album 4½ stars stating "One of Scott's best albums, Shirley Scott and the Soul Saxes finds the organist on a 1969 set of mostly soul covers. This was one of her few dates for the soul-heavy Atlantic label, but it certainly qualifies as a standout in the entire soul-jazz catalog".

== Track listing ==
1. "It's Your Thing" (O'Kelly Isley, Jr., Ronald Isley, Rudolph Isley) - 4:30
2. "(You Make Me Feel Like) A Natural Woman" (Gerry Goffin, Carole King, Jerry Wexler) - 4:20
3. "I Wish I Knew How It Would Feel to Be Free" (Dick Dallas, Billy Taylor) - 6:24
4. "You" (Jack Goga, Ivy Jo Hunter, Jeffrey Owen) - 5:42
5. "Stand by Me" (Ben E. King, Jerry Leiber, Mike Stoller) - 4:04
6. "Get Back" (John Lennon, Paul McCartney) - 4:46
7. "More Today Than Yesterday" (Pat Upton) - 3:39
- Recorded at Atlantic Studios in New York City on September 10, 1968 (track 3) and at Regent Sound Studios in New York City on July 9 (tracks 1, 4 & 5) and July 10 (tracks 2, 6 & 7), 1969

== Personnel ==
- Shirley Scott - organ
- Ernie Royal - trumpet (tracks 1, 2 & 4–7)
- King Curtis, David Newman - flute, tenor saxophone (tracks 1, 2 & 4–7)
- Hank Crawford - alto saxophone, baritone saxophone (tracks 1, 2 & 4–7)
- Richard Tee - piano (tracks 1, 2 & 4–7)
- Eric Gale - guitar
- Jerry Jemmott (track 3), Chuck Rainey (tracks 1, 2 & 4–7) - electric bass
- Jimmy Johnson (tracks 2, 6 & 7), Bernard Purdie (tracks 1 & 3–5) - drums
- Marty Sheller - arranger, conductor (tracks 1, 2 & 4–7)
