= Scottie Plays the Duke =

Studio album by Shirley Scott
- Released: 1959
- Recorded: April 24, 1959
- Studio: Van Gelder Studio, Hackensack, NJ
- Genre: Jazz
- Label: Prestige; PRLP 7163
- Producer: Esmond Edwards

Shirley Scott chronology
Smokin' (1958)	Scottie Plays the Duke (1959)	Soul Searching (1959)

Professional ratings
Review scores
Source	Rating
Allmusic	3/5 stars
DownBeat	3/5 stars

Scottie Plays the Duke is the third album by organist Shirley Scott released with the Prestige label.

== Reception ==
The Allmusic review stated "This is a collection of Duke Ellington tunes".

== Track listing ==
All compositions by Duke Ellington except as indicated

1. "Caravan" (Duke Ellington, Juan Tizol)
2. "Just Squeeze Me"
3. "C Jam Blues"
4. "Prelude to a Kiss"
5. "In a Sentimental Mood"
6. "In a Mellow Tone"
7. "I've Got It Bad"
8. "Just A-Sittin' and A-Rockin'" (Ellington, Billy Strayhorn)

== Personnel ==
- Shirley Scott - organ, piano
- George Duvivier - bass
- Arthur Edgehill - drums
