= Shirley Scott Plays Horace Silver =

Studio album by Shirley Scott
- Released: 1962
- Recorded: November 17, 1961
- Studio: Van Gelder Studio, Englewood Cliffs, NJ
- Genre: Jazz
- Length: 34:06
- Label: Prestige; PR 7240
- Producer: Esmond Edwards

Shirley Scott chronology
Hip Twist (1961)	Shirley Scott Plays Horace Silver (1962)	Happy Talk (1962)

Professional ratings
Review scores
Source	Rating
Allmusic	4/5 stars

Shirley Scott Plays Horace Silver is an album by organist Shirley Scott featuring compositions by Horace Silver which was recorded in 1961 and released on the Prestige label.

== Reception ==
The Allmusic review stated "Just what it says. The queen of the Hammond organ plays compositions by the funk-master himself".

== Track listing ==
All compositions by Horace Silver

1. "Señor Blues" – 4:02
2. "Moonray" – 5:41
3. "Sister Sadie" – 7:24
4. "Doodlin'" – 5:20
5. "The Preacher" – 5:17
6. "Strollin'" – 6:22

== Personnel ==
- Shirley Scott - organ
- Henry Grimes - bass
- Otis Finch - drums
