= Now's the Time (Shirley Scott album) =

Compilation album by Shirley Scott
- Released: 1967
- Recorded: May 27 and October 23, 1958, June 23, 1960, August 22, 1961, and March 31, 1964
- Studios: Van Gelder Studio, Hackensack and Englewood Cliffs, New Jersey
- Genre: Jazz
- Labels: Prestige; PR 7440
- Producers: Bob Weinstock (track 3); Esmond Edwards (tracks 2 & 4–7); Ozzie Cadena (track 1)

Shirley Scott chronology
Travelin' Light (1964)	Now's the Time (1967)	Blue Flames (1964)

Professional ratings
Review scores
Source	Rating
AllMusic	3/5 stars

Now's the Time is an album by organist Shirley Scott compiling several tracks recorded between 1958 and 1964 and released on the Prestige label in 1967.

== Reception ==
AllMusic stated: "This is early Scott, several unreleased tunes from different sessions for this Prestige release".

== Track listing ==
All compositions by Shirley Scott, except where noted.

1. "As It Was" – 5:20
2. "How Sweet" – 7:37
3. "Ebb Tide" (Robert Maxwell, Carl Sigman) – 4:05
4. "Now's the Time" (Charlie Parker) – 4:35
5. "That's Where It's At" – 3:28
6. "Cafe Style" – 4:35
7. "Out of This World" (Harold Arlen, Johnny Mercer) – 4:37
- Recorded at Van Gelder Studio in Hackensack, New Jersey, on May 27, 1958 (track 3) and October 23, 1958 (tracks 5–7) and at Van Gelder Studio in Englewood Cliffs, New Jersey on June 23, 1960 (track 4), August 22, 1961 (track 2), and March 31, 1964 (track 1).

== Personnel ==
- Shirley Scott – organ
- Joe Newman – trumpet (track 2)
- Oliver Nelson (track 2), Stanley Turrentine (track 1) – tenor saxophone
- Lem Winchester – vibraphone (track 4)
- Bob Cranshaw (track 1), George Duvivier (tracks 3–7), George Tucker (track 2) – bass
- Roy Brooks (track 2), Arthur Edgehill (tracks 3–7), Otis Finch (track 1) – drums
