= Shirley Scott =

American jazz organist (1934–2002)

- Born: March 14, 1934; Philadelphia, Pennsylvania, U.S.
- Died: March 10, 2002 (aged 67) Philadelphia, Pennsylvania, U.S.
- Genres: Jazz; hard bop; soul jazz
- Occupations: Musician; educator
- Instruments: Organ; piano
- Years active: 1955–1995
- Labels: Prestige; Impulse!; Cadet; Strata-East; Muse; Candid

Shirley Scott (March 14, 1934 – March 10, 2002) was an American jazz organist. Her music was noted for its mixture of bebop, blues, and gospel elements. She was known by the nickname "Queen of the Organ".

== Life and career ==
Scott was born in Philadelphia, Pennsylvania. Her father operated a jazz club in the basement of the family home and her brother played saxophone. At the age of eight, Scott began taking piano lessons. After enrolling at the Philadelphia High School for Girls, where she was awarded a scholarship, Scott switched to playing trumpet and performed in the all-city schools band.

She received bachelor and master's degrees at Cheyney University in Cheyney, west of Philadelphia. Later in life, Scott returned to the university as a teacher.

As a performer in the 1950s, she played the Hammond B-3 organ. Her recordings with Eddie "Lockjaw" Davis included the hit "In the Kitchen". Influenced by gospel and blues, she played soul jazz in the 1960s with Stanley Turrentine, who became her husband during the same decade; the couple divorced in 1971. Although organ trios declined in popularity during the 1970s, they resurged in the 1980s and she recorded again. In the 1990s, she recorded as pianist in a trio and performed at venues in Philadelphia.

=== As a band leader ===
Scott's success in the industry led her to her own recording with Prestige. Her first album as a bandleader was Great Scott!, released in 1958. She performed with bassist George Duvivier and drummer Arthur Edghill, as the head of the trio. The album consisted of a mix of blues and soul tunes with covers such as of Cole Porter's "All of You", and Latin-influenced tunes and up-tempo burners and ballads with songs such as "Brazil" and "Nothing Ever Changes My love For You". Other notable covers include Ray Noble's "Cherokee" and Miles Davis's "Four", and her own track "The Scott". Scott strategically chose to have a bassist in her recordings instead of a typical melodic instrument, to allow herself full freedom to explore the organ. Laying a bass foundation allowed her to stand out with the solo and melodic sections as an organist.

Despite Scott's undeniable talent and strategic performance as a musician, she struggled to be taken seriously as a musician, especially in a male-dominated industry. In the liner notes for her original release, comments such as: "Shirley Scott is a girl. At the organ she does a man-sized job." However, Scott continued to thrive in her work and released a second album Shirley's Sounds soon after and small group albums such as 1959's Soul Searching and 1960's Soul Sister. Across her lifetime, she led multiple small group line-ups showcasing her passion for music.

=== As an educator and entrepreneur ===
Scott took an interest in the business and academia side of jazz, as she taught jazz history and piano at Cheyney University, Pennsylvania, also receiving a bachelor of arts (B.A.) and a master of arts (M.A.) degree. She also received two Fellowships from the National Endowment for the Arts that helped further her academic career. In 1992–1993, she also appeared on the television show You Bet Your Life. She was recruited as a musical director by Bill Cosby, who had first heard her in clubs in the 1950s. She also spent her time as a church choir director.

=== Personal life ===
Shirley Scott was married to Davis for a number of years, contributing to significant collaborations in music (cite). After her fallout with Davis in 1960, she married the well-known saxophonist Stanley Turrentine, whom she met on a gig in Panama. They married in 1961 and collaborated on many records including Common Touch, and Girl Talk. After her second marriage, Scott continued to tour and recorded over 50 albums. Additionally, Scott had five children, two sons from her first marriage and three daughters from her second marriage.

== Instrument and style ==
Scott was a master of the Hammond B3 organ and was well known for her skillful playing and melodic tunes. However, she did not always start out as a professional organist. Born into a musical family, she was bound to play an instrument. At a young age she played the piano and later played the trumpets during high school. She was skilled in piano and in the mid 1950s she would play piano with John Coltrane at Philadelphia's nightclub. One day a club owner needed her to fill in the role of an organist and Scott took the role, crafting her signature sound almost immediately. In 1955, she switched over to the organ and collaborated with Eddie "Lockjaw" Davis, gaining national recognition. One of her first known hits into the jazz charts was for the Cookbook album with saxophonist Eddie Davis. She emphasized feeling inspired by Jackie Davis and Jimmy Smith. She stated: "Davis and Smith were truly the first two organists who inspired me to pick up the instrument" Amorosi.

Scott brought a fresh new perspective and feel to the B-3’s sounds, making it sound "less heavy" and more "heavenly" and "light touch" (cite). Scott's playing demonstrated a combination of highly rhythmic bebop harmonies and lyrical touch to the B-3 sounds. However, her "deeply-felt" understanding of the blues and gospel set her apart from other organ players as a remarkable organist. In her later albums under the Cadet label, including Mystical Lady (1971), Lean on Me (1972), and Superstition (1973) she explored different rhythms and applied funky jazz to pop and R&B tracks. Scott’s style expresses her versatility as a musician and ability to challenge the status quo of jazz music.

== Death ==
Scott won an $8 million settlement in 2000 against American Home Products, the manufacturers of the diet drug fen-phen. She died of heart failure in 2002 at Presbyterian Hospital in Philadelphia.

== Legacy ==
Scott was a leading figure in the jazz movement for hard pop known as soul jazz. While artists such as Jimmy Smith or Jack McDuff may be more commonly known when discussing the Hammond B3 organ, Scott crafted her own interpretation and had a unique approach on the organ. In a mostly male-dominated industry Scott was not afraid to experiment with the instrument and helped bring a new sense of appreciation of the organ to the jazz world.

== Discography ==
=== As leader ===
- 1958: Great Scott! (Prestige)
- 1958: Scottie (Prestige)
- 1959: Scottie Plays the Duke (Prestige)
- 1959: Soul Searching (Prestige)
- 1958–60: Shirley's Sounds (Prestige) - released 1961
- 1958–60: The Shirley Scott Trio (Moodsville)
- 1960: Soul Sister (Prestige) - with Lem Winchester; released 1966
- 1960: Mucho, Mucho (Prestige) - with The Latin Jazz Quintet
- 1960: Like Cozy (Moodsville) - released 1962
- 1961: Satin Doll (Prestige) - released 1963
- 1958–61: Workin' (Prestige) - released 1967
- 1960–61: Stompin' (Prestige) - released 1967
- 1961: Hip Soul (Prestige) - with Stanley Turrentine
- 1961: Blue Seven (Prestige) - with Oliver Nelson, Joe Newman; released 1966
- 1961: Hip Twist (Prestige) - with Stanley Turrentine
- 1961: Shirley Scott Plays Horace Silver (Prestige)
- 1962: Happy Talk (Prestige) - also released as Sweet Soul in 1965.
- 1963: The Soul Is Willing (Prestige) - with Stanley Turrentine
- 1963: Drag 'em Out (Prestige)
- 1963: Soul Shoutin' (Prestige) - with Stanley Turrentine
- 1964: For Members Only (Impulse!) - with Oliver Nelson
- 1964: Travelin' Light (Prestige) - with Kenny Burrell
- 1958–64: Now's the Time (Prestige) - released 1967
- 1964: Blue Flames (Prestige) - with Stanley Turrentine
- 1964: Great Scott!! (Impulse!) - with Oliver Nelson
- 1964: Everybody Loves a Lover (Impulse!) - with Stanley Turrentine
- 1964: Queen of the Organ [live] (Impulse!) - with Stanley Turrentine
- 1965: Latin Shadows (Impulse!) - with Gary McFarland
- 1966: On a Clear Day (Impulse!)
- 1966: Roll 'Em: Shirley Scott Plays the Big Bands (Impulse!) - with Oliver Nelson
- 1966: Soul Duo (Impulse!) - with Clark Terry
- 1967: Girl Talk (Impulse!)
- 1968: Soul Song (Atlantic) - with Stanley Turrentine
- 1969: Shirley Scott & the Soul Saxes (Atlantic) - with King Curtis, Hank Crawford, David "Fathead" Newman
- 1970: Something (Atlantic)
- 1971: Mystical Lady (Cadet)
- 1972: Lean on Me (Cadet)
- 1973: Superstition (Cadet) - with Richard Evans
- 1974: One for Me (Stata East) - with Harold Vick, Billy Higgins
- 1978: The Great Live Sessions (ABC/Impulse!) [2LP] - with Stanley Turrentine; recorded 1964
- 1989: Oasis (Muse)
- 1991: Great Scott! (Muse)
- 1991: Blues Everywhere (Candid)
- 1991: Skylark (Candid)
- 1992: A Walkin' Thing (Candid) - with Terell Stafford, Tim Warfield
- 2023: Queen Talk: Live at the Left Bank (Reel To Real/Cellar Music Group) - recorded 1972

=== LP/CD compilations ===
- 1969: The Best of Shirley Scott With Stanley Turrentine (Prestige PR 7707)
- 1970: The Best of Shirley Scott With Stanley Turrentine/For Beautiful People (Prestige PR 7773)
- 1993: Workin' (Prestige) (compilation of Workin' + Stompin' )
- 1994: Soul Shoutin' (Prestige) (compilation of The Soul Is Willing + Soul Shoutin' )
- 1998: Legends of Acid Jazz: Shirley Scott (Prestige) (compilation of Hip Soul + Hip Twist)
- 1998: Stanley Turrentine & Shirley Scott: Priceless Jazz (GRP) (includes 3 tracks from Scott's Queen of the Organ and 5 tracks from Turrentine's Let It Go, both originally on Impulse!)
- 1999: Soul Sister (Prestige) (compilation of Soul Sister + Travelin' Light)
- 2001: Like Cozy (Prestige) (compilation of The Shirley Scott Trio + Like Cozy)
- 2001: Shirley Scott: Talkin' Verve (Verve) (includes tracks from 9 albums: Impulse! AS-9051/AS-9067/AS-9073/AS-9093/AS-9115/AS-9119/AS-9133/AS-9141 and Cadet CA-50009)
- 2003: Shirley Scott Memorial Album (1958–1964) (Prestige)
- 2004: Trio Classics, Vol. 1 (Prestige) (compilation of Great Scott! + Shirley's Sounds)

=== As sidewoman ===
With Stanley Turrentine

- 1961: Dearly Beloved (Blue Note)
- 1963: Never Let Me Go (Blue Note)
- 1963: A Chip Off the Old Block (Blue Note)
- 1964: Hustlin' (Blue Note)
- 1966: Let It Go (Impulse!)
- 1968: Common Touch (Blue Note)

With Mildred Anderson

- 1960: Person to Person (Bluesville)

With Eddie "Lockjaw" Davis

- 1956–57: Jazz With A Beat (King)
- 1957: Count Basie Presents Eddie Davis Trio + Joe Newman (Roulette)
- 1958: Eddie Davis Trio Featuring Shirley Scott, Organ (Roulette)
- 1958: The Eddie Davis Trio Featuring Shirley Scott, Organ (Roost)
- 1958: The Eddie "Lockjaw" Davis Cookbook, Vol. 1 (Prestige)
- 1958: Jaws (Prestige)
- 1958: The Eddie "Lockjaw" Davis Cookbook, Vol. 2 (Prestige)
- 1959: Very Saxy (Prestige) - with Buddy Tate, Coleman Hawkins, Arnett Cobb
- 1959: Jaws in Orbit (Prestige)
- 1959: Bacalao (Prestige)
- 1960: Eddie "Lockjaw" Davis with Shirley Scott (Moodsville)
- 1961: The Eddie "Lockjaw" Davis Cookbook Volume 3 (Prestige) - recorded 1958
- 1963: Misty (Moodsville) - recorded 1959–60
- 1964: Smokin' (Prestige) - recorded 1958

With Jimmy Forrest

- 1978: Heart of the Forrest (Palo Alto)

With Dexter Gordon

- 1982: American Classic (Elektra/Musician)

With Al Grey

- 1977: Al Grey Jazz All Stars: Travelers Lounge Live (Travelers)
- 1979: Al Grey/Jimmy Forrest Quintet: Live at Rick's (Aviva)

With Joe Newman

- 1958: Soft Swingin' Jazz (Coral)

With Jimmy Rushing

- 1967: Every Day I Have the Blues (BluesWay)

With Al Smith

- 1959: Hear My Blues (Bluesville)
