= George Duvivier =

American jazz double-bassist (1920–1985)

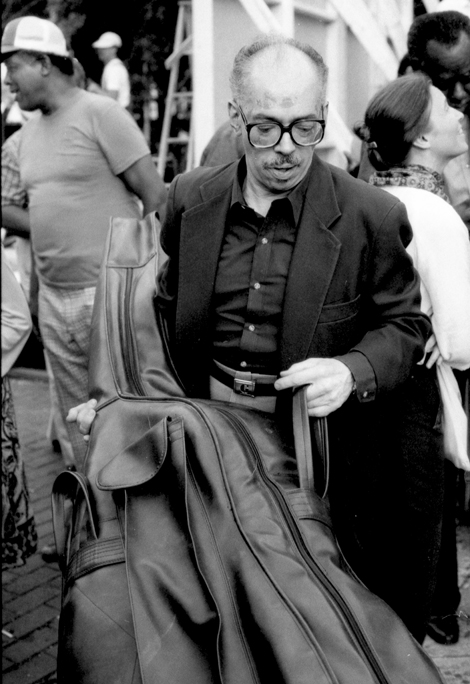
- George Duvivier at the Greenwich Village Jazz Festival in Washington Square Park, New York City, 1984

Background information
- Born: August 17, 1920; New York City
- Died: July 11, 1985 (aged 64) New York City
- Genres: Jazz
- Occupation: Musician
- Instrument: Double bass
- Years active: 1940s–1980s

George Duvivier (August 17, 1920 – July 11, 1985) was an American jazz double-bassist.

== Biography ==
Duvivier was born in New York City, the son of Leon V. Duvivier and Ismay Blakely Duvivier. He attended the Conservatory of Music and Art, where he studied violin. At age sixteen, he worked as assistant concertmaster for the Central Manhattan Symphony Orchestra. He began playing double bass and concentrated on composition at New York University. In the early 1940s, he accompanied Coleman Hawkins, Lucky Millinder, and Eddie Barefield. After serving in the U.S. Army, he worked as an arranger for Jimmie Lunceford, then as arranger and bassist for Sy Oliver.

In the 1950s, he accompanied Lena Horne on her tour in Europe. He recorded for commercials, television shows, and movie soundtracks. Although he spent most of his career as a sideman, he recorded as a leader in 1956 with Martial Solal for Coronet. For four years beginning in 1953, he worked steadily with Bud Powell. He also worked with Count Basie, Benny Carter, Benny Goodman, Chico Hamilton, Hank Jones, Shelly Manne, Oliver Nelson, Frank Sinatra, Clark Terry, Ben Webster, and Bob Wilber. As well as Tom Waits

He died of cancer in New York, aged 64.

== Personal life ==
Duvivier was Catholic.

== Legacy ==
His mother Ismay Duvivier, once a dancer, donated a large collection of papers, including letters and scrapbooks of her career and his, to the Institute of Jazz Studies at Rutgers University.

== Discography ==
With Pepper Adams

- The Cool Sound of Pepper Adams (Regent, 1957)

With Manny Albam

- Jazz Goes to the Movies (Impulse!, 1962)

With Joe Albany

- Portrait of an Artist (Elektra, 1982)

With Gene Ammons

- Up Tight! (Prestige, 1961)
- Boss Soul! (Prestige, 1961)
- Soul Summit Vol. 2 (Prestige, 1962)
- The Soulful Moods of Gene Ammons (Moodsville, 1962)
- Late Hour Special (Prestige, 1964)
- Sock! (Prestige, 1965)
- Night Lights (Prestige, 1985)

With Mildred Anderson

- Person to Person (Bluesville, 1960)

With The Arbors

- The Arbors (Vanguard, 1962)

With Louis Armstrong

- Louis Armstrong and His Friends (Flying Dutchman, 1970)

With Count Basie

- String Along with Basie (Roulette, 1960)
- Basie Swingin' Voices Singin' (ABC-Paramount, 1966)
- High Voltage (MPS, 1970)

With Louis Bellson

- Louis Bellson Quintet (Norgran, 1954)
- Drummer's Holiday (Verve, 1958)

With Tony Bennett

- I've Gotta Be Me (Columbia, 1969)

With George Benson, Al Harewood and Mickey Tucker

- Jazz on a Sunday Afternoon, Volume 1 (Accord, 1981, rec. 1973)
- Jazz on a Sunday Afternoon, Volume 2 (Accord, 1981)
- Jazz on a Sunday Afternoon, Volume 3 (Accord, 1982)

With Bob Brookmeyer

- Portrait of the Artist (Atlantic, 1960)
- Gloomy Sunday and Other Bright Moments (Verve, 1961)

With Oscar Brown

- Sin & Soul (Columbia, 1960)

With Ruth Brown

- Ruth Brown (Atlantic, 1957)

With Ray Bryant

- Here's Ray Bryant (Pablo, 1976)

With Kenny Burrell

- Blue Bash! (Verve, 1963)
- Bluesin' Around (Columbia, 1983)

With Benny Carter

- Benny Carter Plays Pretty (Norgran, 1954)
- New Jazz Sounds (Norgran, 1954)
- 'Live and Well in Japan! (Pablo Live, 1978)

With Betty Carter

- 'Round Midnight (Atco, 1963)

With Ron Carter

- Where? (New Jazz, 1961)

With Sonny Clark and Max Roach

- Sonny Clark Trio (Time, 1960)

With Arnett Cobb

- Blow Arnett, Blow (Prestige, 1959) – with Eddie "Lockjaw" Davis
- Smooth Sailing (Prestige, 1959)
- Live at Sandy's! (Muse, 1978)
- Keep On Pushin' (Bee Hive, 1984)

With Al Cohn

- Son of Drum Suite (RCA Victor, 1960)
- Body and Soul (Muse, 1973)

With Sam Cooke

- My Kind of Blues (RCA Victor, 1961)

With Eddie "Lockjaw" Davis

- Count Basie Presents Eddie Davis Trio + Joe Newman (Roulette, 1958)
- Eddie Davis Trio Featuring Shirley Scott, Organ (Roulette, 1959)
- The Eddie Davis Trio Featuring Shirley Scott (Roost, 1958)
- The Eddie "Lockjaw" Davis Cookbook (Prestige, 1958)
- Jaws (Prestige, 1958)
- The Eddie "Lockjaw" Davis Cookbook, Vol. 2 (Prestige, 1958)
- The Eddie "Lockjaw" Davis Cookbook Volume 3 (Prestige, 1958)
- Smokin' (Prestige, 1958) – released 1964
- Very Saxy (Prestige, 1959)
- Jaws in Orbit (Prestige, 1959)
- Bacalao (Prestige, 1959)
- Eddie "Lockjaw" Davis with Shirley Scott (Moodsville, 1960)
- I Only Have Eyes for You (Prestige, 1962)
- Trackin' (Prestige, 1962)
- Misty (Moodsville, 1963)
- The Heavy Hitter (Muse, 1979)

With Buddy DeFranco

- Like Someone in Love (Progressive, 1977)

With Eric Dolphy

- Out There (Prestige, 1960)

With Art Farmer

- Listen to Art Farmer and the Orchestra (Mercury, 1962)
- Baroque Sketches (Columbia, 1967)

With Jimmy Forrest

- Soul Street (New Jazz, 1960)

With Ronnie Foster

- Two Headed Freap (Blue Note, 1972)

With Aretha Franklin

- Unforgettable: A Tribute to Dinah Washington (Columbia Records, 1964)

With Bud Freeman

- The Bud Freeman All-Stars featuring Shorty Baker (Swingville, 1960) with Shorty Baker

With Stan Getz

- Stan Getz With Guest Artist Laurindo Almeida (Verve, 1963)
- Reflections (Verve, 1963)

With Dizzy Gillespie

- A Portrait of Duke Ellington (Verve, 1960)
- Perceptions (Verve, 1961)
- Giants (Perception, 1971)

With Paul Gonsalves

- Cleopatra Feelin' Jazzy (Impulse!, 1963)

With Honi Gordon

- Honi Gordon Sings (Prestige, 1962)

With Gigi Gryce

- Reminiscin' (Mercury, 1960)

With Chico Hamilton

- Chico Hamilton Trio (Pacific Jazz, 1956)

With Roland Hanna

- Destry Rides Again (Atco, 1959)

With Wilbur Harden

- The King and I (Savoy, 1958)

With Barry Harris

- Vicissitudes (MPS, 1972)
- Barry Harris Plays Barry Harris (Xanadu, 1978)

With Coleman Hawkins

- Coleman Hawkins and Confrères (Verve, 1958)
- Hawk Eyes (Prestige, 1959)
- Coleman Hawkins and His Orchestra (Crown, 1960)
- The Hawk Swings (Crown, 1960)

With Donna Hightower

- Take One (Capitol, 1959)

With Johnny Hodges

- Con-Soul & Sax (RCA Victor, 1965) with Wild Bill Davis
- Blue Notes (Verve, 1966)

With Lena Horne

- Stormy Weather (RCA Victor, 1957)
- Lena on the Blue Side (RCA Victor, 1962)

With Bobbi Humphrey

- Flute-In (Blue Note, 1971)

With Janis Ian

- Stars (Columbia Records, 1974)
- Between the Lines (Columbia Records, 1975)

With Milt Jackson

- Vibrations (Atlantic, 1964)

With Illinois Jacquet

- Spectrum (Argo, 1965)
- Illinois Jacquet Quartet Live at Schaffhausen, Switzerland, March 18, 1978

With Budd Johnson

- Let's Swing! (Swingville, 1960)
- Ya! Ya! (Argo, 1964)
- Off the Wall (Argo, 1964)

With Etta Jones

- Something Nice (Prestige, 1961)
- So Warm (Prestige, 1961)
- Lonely and Blue (Prestige, 1962)
- Save Your Love for Me (Muse, 1980)

With Hank Jones

- Bop Redux (Muse, 1977)
- I Remember You (Black & Blue, 1977)
- Compassion (Black & Blue, 1978)
- Bluesette (Black & Blue, 1979)

With Eric Kaz

- If You're Lonely (Atlantic Records, 1972)

With Ben E. King

- Spanish Harlem (Atco Records, 1961)
- Don't Play That Song! (Atco Records, 1962)
- Young Boy Blues (Atco Records, 1964)

With Jeanne Lee and Ran Blake

- The Newest Sound Around (RCA Victor, 1962)

With John Lennon

- Imagine (Apple Records, 1971)

With John Lewis

- The Golden Striker (Atlantic, 1960)
- The Wonderful World of Jazz (Atlantic, 1960)
- Essence (Atlantic, 1962)

With Mundell Lowe

- Porgy & Bess (RCA Camden, 1958)
- Themes from Mr. Lucky, the Untouchables and Other TV Action Jazz (RCA Camden, 1960)
- Satan in High Heels (soundtrack) (Charlie Parker, 1961)

With Johnny Lytle

- The Loop (Tuba, 1965)
- New and Groovy (Tuba, 1966)
- Everything Must Change (Muse, 1977)

With Mary Ann McCall

- Detour to the Moon (Jubilee, 1958)

With Junior Mance

- The Soul of Hollywood (Jazzland, 1962)

With Barry Manilow

- 2:00 AM Paradise Cafe (Arista, 1984)

With Shelly Manne

- 2-3-4 (Impulse!, 1962)

With Don McLean

- Homeless Brother (United Artists Records, 1974)

With Gil Mellé

- Quadrama (Prestige, 1957)

With Helen Merrill

- American Country Songs (Atco, 1959)

With Wes Montgomery

- Goin' Out of My Head (Verve, 1966)

With Moondog

- Moondog (Columbia, 1969)

With Gerry Mulligan

- Idol Gossip (Chiaroscuro, 1976)

With Mark Murphy

- Rah (Riverside, 1961)

With Oliver Nelson

- Soul Battle (Prestige, 1960) – with Jimmy Forrest
- Screamin' the Blues (New Jazz Records, 1961)
- Straight Ahead (Oliver Nelson album) (New Jazz Records, 1961)
- Impressions of Phaedra (United Artists Jazz, 1962)
- Happenings (Impulse!, 1966)
- The Spirit of '67 (Impulse!, 1967)
- The Kennedy Dream (Impulse!, 1967)

With Phineas Newborn, Jr.

- Phineas Newborn, Jr. Plays Harold Arlen's Music from Jamaica (RCA Victor, 1957)

With Herbie Nichols

- Love, Gloom, Cash, Love (Bethlehem, 1957)

With Anita O'Day

- All the Sad Young Men (Verve, 1962)

With Chico O'Farrill

- Spanish Rice (Impulse!, 1966)
- Nine Flags (Impulse!, 1966)

With Jackie Paris

- The Song Is Paris (Impulse!, 1962)

With Houston Person

- Sweet Buns & Barbeque (Prestige, 1972)

With Esther Phillips

- Esther Phillips Sings (Atlantic, 1966)

With Dave Pike

- Limbo Carnival (New Jazz, 1962)

With Bucky Pizzarelli

- Songs for New Lovers (Stash, 1978)

With Bud Powell

- The Amazing Bud Powell Vol. 2 (Blue Note, 1953)
- Piano Interpretations by Bud Powell (Verve, 1956)

With Freddie Redd

- Lonely City (Uptown, 1989)

With Red Rodney

- Home Free (Muse, 1979)
- The 3R's (Muse, 1982)

With Jimmy Rushing

- Every Day I Have the Blues (BluesWay, 1967)

With A. K. Salim

- Stable Mates (Savoy, 1957)
- Blues Suite (Savoy, 1958)

With Lalo Schifrin

- Between Broadway & Hollywood (MGM, 1963)
- New Fantasy (Verve, 1964)

With Gunther Schuller

- Jazz Abstractions (Atlantic, 1960)

With Shirley Scott

- Great Scott! (Prestige, 1958)
- Scottie (Prestige, 1958)
- The Shirley Scott Trio (Moodsville, 1958)
- Scottie Plays the Duke (Prestige, 1959)
- Soul Sister (Prestige 1960)
- Like Cozy (Moodsville, 1960)
- Shirley's Sounds (Prestige, 1961)
- Great Scott!! (Impulse!, 1964)
- Roll 'Em: Shirley Scott Plays the Big Bands (Impulse!, 1966)
- Soul Duo (Impulse!, 1966) – with Clark Terry
- Girl Talk (Impulse!, 1967)
- Now's the Time (Prestige, 1967)

With Frank Sinatra

- Trilogy: Past Present Future (Reprise, 1980)

With Carrie Smith

- Do Your Duty (Black & Blue, 1976)
- Carrie Smith (West 54, 1979)

With Derek Smith

- Love for Sale (Progressive, 1978)

With Jimmy Smith

- Got My Mojo Workin' (Verve, 1966)

With Johnny Smith

- Johnny Smith (Verve, 1967)

With Leon Spencer

- Where I'm Coming From (Prestige, 1973)

With Sonny Stitt

- What's New!!! (Roulette, 1966)
- I Keep Comin' Back! (Roulette, 1966)
- Parallel-a-Stitt (Roulette, 1967)
- Goin' Down Slow (Prestige, 1972)
- In Style (Muse, 1982)
- The Last Sessions (Muse, 1982)

With Buddy Tate

- Live at Sandy's (Muse, 1980)
- Hard Blowin' (Muse, 1984)

With Billy Taylor

- Kwamina (Mercury, 1961)

With Clark Terry

- Mumbles (Mainstream, 1966)
- It's What's Happenin' (Impulse!, 1967)

With Joe Thomas and Jay McShann

- Blowin' in from K.C. (Uptown, 1983)

With Cal Tjader

- Several Shades of Jade (Verve, 1963)
- Breeze from the East (Verve, 1963)
- Warm Wave (Verve, 1964)
- El Sonido Nuevo (Verve, 1967) with Eddie Palmieri
- Last Bolero in Berkeley (Fantasy, 1973)

With Stanley Turrentine

- Stan "The Man" Turrentine (Time, 1963)

With Sarah Vaughan

- Dreamy (Roulette, 1960)
- After Hours (Roulette, 1961)
- ¡Viva! Vaughan (Mercury Records, 1965)

With Warren Vaché Jr.

- Iridescence (Concord Jazz, 1999)

With Eddie "Cleanhead" Vinson

- Live at Sandy's (Muse, 1981)
- Hold It Right There! (Muse, 1984)

With Mal Waldron

- Sweet Love, Bitter (Impulse!, 1967)

With Walter Wanderley

- Moondreams (CTI, 1969)

With Julius Watkins

- French Horns for My Lady (Philips, 1962)

With Chuck Wayne

- The Jazz Guitarist (Savoy, 1956)

With Ben Webster

- Music for Loving (Norgran, 1954)
- Wanted to Do One Together (Columbia, 1962) with "Sweets" Edison

With Frank Wess

- Southern Comfort (Prestige, 1962)

With Randy Weston

- Uhuru Afrika (Roulette, 1960)

With Bob Wilber & Kenny Davern

- Soprano Summit (Chiaroscuro, 1977)

With Joe Wilder

- The Pretty Sound (Columbia, 1959)

With Joe Williams

- Memories Ad-Lib (Roulette, 1959)
- Having the Blues Under European Sky (Denon, 1985)

With Lem Winchester

- Lem Winchester with Feeling (Moodsville, 1961)

With Lester Young

- Laughin' to Keep from Cryin' (Verve, 1958)
