= Count Basie Presents Eddie Davis Trio + Joe Newman =

Studio album by Eddie "Lockjaw" Davis, Joe Newman and Count Basie
- Released: 1958
- Recorded: December 17–19, 1957; New York City
- Genre: Jazz
- Length: 38:47
- Label: Roulette; R/SR 52007
- Producer: Teddy Reig

Count Basie chronology
The Atomic Mr. Basie (1957)	Count Basie Presents Eddie Davis Trio + Joe Newman (1958)	Basie Plays Hefti (1958)

Eddie "Lockjaw" Davis chronology
Modern Jazz Expressions (1956)	Count Basie Presents Eddie Davis Trio + Joe Newman (1957)	Eddie Davis Trio Featuring Shirley Scott, Organ (1958)

Count Basie Presents Eddie Davis Trio + Joe Newman (also released as Countin' on Basie) is an album by saxophonist Eddie "Lockjaw" Davis' Trio with Count Basie and Joe Newman recorded in late 1957 and originally released on the Roulette label.

== Reception ==
Professional ratings
Review scores
Source	Rating
AllMusic	3/5 stars

AllMusic awarded the album 3 stars.

== Track listing ==
All compositions by Eddie "Lockjaw" Davis except as indicated

1. "Broadway" (Billy Byrd, Teddy McRae, Henri Wood) - 4:36
2. "Don't Blame Me" (Jimmy McHugh, Dorothy Fields) - 3:50
3. "A Misty One" - 4:37
4. "Save Your Love for Me" (Oscar Pettiford) - 3:56
5. "Telegraph" - 5:07
6. "Farouk" - 5:22
7. "Lock-Up" - 2:57
8. "On the Street of Dreams" (Victor Young, Sam M. Lewis) - 2:51
9. "Swingin' Till the Girls Come Home" (Pettiford) - 5:31

== Personnel ==
- Eddie "Lockjaw" Davis - tenor saxophone
- Count Basie - piano
- Joe Newman - trumpet
- Shirley Scott - organ
- George Duvivier - bass
- George "Butch" Ballard - drums
