= Soul Searching (Shirley Scott album) =

Studio album by Shirley Scott
- Released: 1960
- Recorded: December 4, 1959; Van Gelder Studio, Englewood Cliffs
- Genre: Jazz
- Length: 40:00
- Label: Prestige; PRLP 7173
- Producer: Esmond Edwards

Shirley Scott chronology
Jaws in Orbit (1959)	Soul Searching (1960)	Shirley's Sounds (1958-60)

Professional ratings
Review scores
Source	Rating
Allmusic	3.5/5 stars

Soul Searching is an album by organist Shirley Scott for the Prestige label which was recorded in 1959.

== Reception ==
The Allmusic review stated "Soul Searching spotlights Shirley Scott's accelerated development as a composer... each song is a model of energy and efficiency as tight as an outgrown pair of shoes".

== Track listing ==
All compositions by Shirley Scott except as indicated

1. "Duck and Rock"- 5:35
2. "Gee, Baby, Ain't I Good to You" (Don Redman, Andy Razaf) - 4:50
3. "Yes Indeed" (Sy Oliver) - 5:53
4. "Boss" – 4:32
5. "Moanin'" (Bobby Timmons) - 5:35
6. "Plunk, Plunk, Plunk" - 4:33
7. "You Won't Let Me Go" (Buddy Johnson) - 4:32
8. "Soul Searchin'" - 4:30

== Personnel ==
- Shirley Scott - organ
- Wendell Marshall - bass
- Arthur Edgehill - drums
