= Scottie (album) =

Studio album by Shirley Scott
- Released: 1959
- Recorded: October 23, 1958; Van Gelder Studio, Hackensack
- Genre: Jazz
- Label: Prestige; PRLP 7155
- Producer: Esmond Edwards

Shirley Scott chronology
Jaws (1958)	Scottie (1959)	The Eddie "Lockjaw" Davis Cookbook, Vol. 2 (1959)

Professional ratings
Review scores
Source	Rating
Allmusic	3/5 stars

Scottie is an album by organist Shirley Scott recorded in 1958 for the Prestige label.

== Reception ==
The Allmusic review stated "This is early Scott".

== Track listing ==
1. "Mr. Wonderful" (Jerry Bock, George David Weiss, Larry Holofcener)
2. "How Deep Is the Ocean?" (Irving Berlin)
3. "Time On My Hands" (Vincent Youmans)
4. "Hong Pong" (Shirley Scott)
5. "Takin' Care of Business" (Shirley Scott)
6. "Cherry" (Don Redman, Ray Gilbert)
7. "Diane" (Erno Rapee, Lew Pollack)
8. "Please Send Me Someone to Love" (Percy Mayfield)

== Personnel ==
- Shirley Scott - organ
- George Duvivier - bass
- Arthur Edgehill - drums
