= Shirley's Sounds =

1961 studio album by organist Shirley Scott

Studio album by Shirley Scott
- Released: Early June 1961
- Recorded: May 23, 1958 (#1–3, 5–7); October 23, 1958 (#8); Van Gelder Studio, Hackensack; April 8, 1960 (#4); Van Gelder Studio, Englewood Cliffs
- Genre: Jazz
- Label: Prestige; PRLP 7195
- Producer: Bob Weinstock

Shirley Scott chronology
Misty (1960)	Shirley's Sounds (1961)	The Shirley Scott Trio (1958–60)

Shirley's Sounds is a studio album by organist Shirley Scott recorded mainly in 1958 for Prestige but not released until 1961 as PRLP 7195.

== Reception ==
Professional ratings
Review scores
Source	Rating
AllMusic	3/5 stars
DownBeat	3/5 stars

The contemporaneous DownBeat reviewer, Leonard Feather, praised the playing, while observing that there was little to distinguish the album from the large volume of other LPs by Hammond players. The AllMusic review stated "it's superior early organ jazz, full-sounding but streamlined owing to the trio format".

== Track listing ==
1. "It Could Happen to You" (Johnny Burke, Jimmy Van Heusen) - 4:32
2. "Summertime" (George Gershwin, DuBose Heyward) - 4:00
3. "There Will Never Be Another You" (Harry Warren, Mack Gordon) - 3:24
4. "Bye Bye Blackbird" (Ray Henderson, Mort Dixon) - 6:38
5. "S'Posin'" (Paul Denniker, Andy Razaf) - 4:20
6. "Baby Won't You Please Come Home" (Charles Warfield, Clarence Williams) - 4:04
7. "Indiana" (Ballard MacDonald, James F. Hanley) - 3:25
8. "I Can't See for Lookin'" (Nadine Robinson, Dok Stanford) - 4:11

== Personnel ==
- Shirley Scott - organ
- George Tucker (#4), George Duvivier (all others) - bass
- Arthur Edgehill - drums
