= Eddie "Lockjaw" Davis =

American jazz saxophonist (1922–1986)

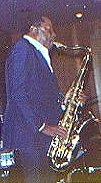

Background information
- Born: Edward F. Davis; March 2, 1922; New York City, U.S.
- Died: November 3, 1986 (aged 64) Culver City, California, U.S.
- Genres: Jazz, swing
- Occupation: Musician
- Instrument: Saxophone
- Labels: Prestige, Riverside, RCA Victor

Edward F. Davis (March 2, 1922 – November 3, 1986), known professionally as Eddie "Lockjaw" Davis, was an American jazz tenor saxophonist. It is unclear how he acquired the moniker "Lockjaw" (later shortened to "Jaws"): it is either said that it came from the title of a tune or from his way of biting hard on the saxophone mouthpiece. Other theories have been put forward.

== Biography ==
Davis played with Cootie Williams, Lucky Millinder, Andy Kirk, Eddie Bonnemère, Louis Armstrong, and Count Basie, as well as leading his own bands and making many recordings as a leader. He played in the swing, bop, hard bop, Latin jazz, and soul jazz genres. Some of his recordings from the 1940s also could be classified as rhythm and blues.

In 1940, when Teddy Hill became the manager of the legendary Minton's Jazz club, he put Eddie Davis in charge of deciding which musicians could, or couldn't, sit in during the jam sessions (playing in this Minton's sessions was coveted by many, including musicians which were not up to the demanding standards of the venue).

His 1946 band, Eddie Davis and His Beboppers, featured Fats Navarro, Al Haig, Huey Long, Gene Ramey and Denzil Best.

In the 1950s, he was playing with Sonny Stitt, while from 1960 to 1962, he and fellow tenor saxophonist Johnny Griffin led a quintet.

Starting in 1955, and up to 1960, Eddie Davis pioneered the tenor sax/Hammond organ combo, in a group featuring Shirley Scott on the Hammond B3.

From the mid-1960s, Davis and Griffin also performed together as part of the Kenny Clarke/Francy Boland Big Band, along with other, mainly European, jazz musicians.

Davis died of Hodgkin's lymphoma in Culver City, California, at the age of 64.

== Discography ==
=== As leader/co-leader ===
- 1954: Goodies from Eddie Davis (Roost [10" LP])
- 1955: The Battle of Birdland [live] (Roost) – with Sonny Stitt
- 1956: Modern Jazz Expressions (King)
- 1956: Jazz With a Horn (King) – also released as This and That (King, 1959)
- 1956–57: Jazz With a Beat (King) – with Shirley Scott; released 1958
- 1957: Big Beat Jazz (King) – released 1958
- 1957: Uptown (King) – released 1958
- 1957: Count Basie Presents Eddie Davis Trio + Joe Newman (Roulette)
- 1958: Eddie Davis Trio Featuring Shirley Scott, Organ (Roulette)
- 1958: The Eddie Davis Trio Featuring Shirley Scott, Organ (Roost)
- 1958: The Eddie "Lockjaw" Davis Cookbook, Vol. 1 (Prestige) – with Shirley Scott, Jerome Richardson; also released as In the Kitchen (Prestige, 1969)
- 1958: Jaws (Prestige) – with Shirley Scott
- 1958: The Eddie "Lockjaw" Davis Cookbook, Vol. 2 (Prestige) – with Shirley Scott, Jerome Richardson; also released as The Rev (Prestige, 1970)
- 1958: The Eddie "Lockjaw" Davis Cookbook Volume 3 (Prestige) – with Shirley Scott, Jerome Richardson; released 1961
- 1958: Smokin' [the 4th volume in the Cookbook series] (Prestige) – with Shirley Scott, Jerome Richardson; released 1964
- 1959: Very Saxy (Prestige) – with Buddy Tate, Coleman Hawkins, Arnett Cobb
- 1959: Jaws in Orbit (Prestige) – with Steve Pulliam, Shirley Scott
- 1959: Bacalao (Prestige) – with Shirley Scott
- 1960: Eddie "Lockjaw" Davis with Shirley Scott (Moodsville) note: Scott also on piano
- 1960: Misty (Moodsville) – with Shirley Scott; released 1963
- 1960: Afro-Jaws (Riverside) – with Ray Barretto; also released as Alma Alegre (Jazzland, 1964)
- 1960: Battle Stations (Prestige) – with Johnny Griffin, Norman Simmons; released 1963
- 1960: Trane Whistle (Prestige) – with big band arranged by Oliver Nelson, Ernie Wilkins
- 1960: Tough Tenors (Jazzland) – with Johnny Griffin, Junior Mance
- 1960: Griff & Lock (Jazzland) – with Johnny Griffin, Junior Mance; released 1961
- 1961: The Tenor Scene (Prestige) – with Johnny Griffin, Junior Mance; also released as The Breakfast Show (Prestige, 1966)
- 1961: The First Set (Prestige) – with Johnny Griffin, Junior Mance; released 1964
- 1961: The Midnight Show (Prestige) – with Johnny Griffin, Junior Mance; released 1965
- 1961: The Late Show (Prestige) – with Johnny Griffin, Junior Mance; released 1965
- 1961: Lookin' at Monk! (Jazzland) – with Johnny Griffin, Junior Mance
- 1961: Blues Up & Down (Jazzland) – with Johnny Griffin, Lloyd Mayers; released 1962
- 1962: Tough Tenor Favorites (Jazzland) – with Johnny Griffin, Horace Parlan
- 1962: Jawbreakers (Riverside) – with Harry "Sweets" Edison
- 1962: Goin' to the Meeting (Prestige) – with Horace Parlan
- 1962: I Only Have Eyes for You (Prestige) – with Don Patterson; released 1963
- 1962: Trackin' (Prestige) – with Don Patterson; released 1963
- 1966: Lock, the Fox (RCA Victor) – with Ross Tompkins
- 1967: The Fox & the Hounds (RCA Victor) – with big band arranged by Bobby Plater
- 1968: Love Calls (RCA Victor) – with Paul Gonsalves
- 1970: Tough Tenors Again 'n' Again (MPS) – with Johnny Griffin
- 1974: Leapin' on Lenox (Black & Blue)
- 1975: The Tenor Giants Featuring Oscar Peterson (Pablo) – with Zoot Sims
- 1975: Light and Lovely (Black & Blue) – with Harry "Sweets" Edison
- 1975: Chewin' the Fat (Spotlite)
- 1976: Jaws Strikes Again (Black & Blue) – with Wild Bill Davis
- 1976: Swingin' Till the Girls Come Home (SteepleChase; Inner City)
- 1976: Straight Ahead (Pablo)
- 1976: Lockjaw with Sweets (Storyville) – with Harry "Sweets" Edison
- 1976: Opus Funk (Storyville) – with Harry "Sweets" Edison
- 1977: Eddie "Lockjaw" Davis 4 – Montreux '77 (Pablo)
- 1977: Simply Sweets (Pablo) – with Harry "Sweets" Edison, Dolo Coker
- 1978: Midnight Slows Vol. 10 (Black & Blue) – with Bill Doggett
- 1979: The Heavy Hitter (Muse)
- 1981: Jaw's Blues (Enja) – with Horace Parlan; released 1986
- 1981: Sonny, Sweets & Jaws – Recorded Live at Bubba's (Who's Who in Jazz) – with Sonny Stitt, Harry "Sweets" Edison
- 1983: Eddie "Lockjaw" Davis/Harry "Sweets" Edison/Al Grey – Jazz at the Philharmonic 1983 (Pablo) – recorded 1982
- 1983: All of Me (SteepleChase) – with Kenny Drew
- 1983: Jazz at the Philharmonic – Yoyogi National Stadium, Tokyo 1983: Return to Happiness (Pablo)
- 1984: Tough Tenors Back Again! (Storyville) – with Johnny Griffin; released 1998

=== As sideman ===
With Mildred Anderson

- Person to Person (Bluesville, 1960) – with Shirley Scott

With Count Basie

- The Count! (Clef, 1952 [rel. 1955])
- Basie Jazz (Clef, 1952 [rel. 1954])
- Dance Session Album #2 (Clef, 1954)
- The Atomic Mr. Basie (Roulette, 1957) – originally titled Basie; also known as E=MC^{2}
- Everyday I Have the Blues (Roulette, 1959)
- The Count Basie Story (Roulette, 1960)
- Pop Goes the Basie (Reprise, 1965)
- Basie Meets Bond (United Artists, 1966)
- Live at the Sands (Before Frank) (Reprise, 1966 [rel. 1998])
- Sinatra at the Sands (Reprise, 1966)
- Basie's Beatle Bag (Verve, 1966)
- Basie Swingin' Voices Singin' (ABC-Paramount, 1966)
- Basie's Beat (Verve, 1967)
- Broadway Basie's...Way (Command, 1966)
- Hollywood...Basie's Way (Command, 1967)
- Basie's in the Bag (Brunswick, 1967)
- Count Basie Captures Walt Disney's The Happiest Millionaire (Coliseum, 1967)
- Manufacturers of Soul (Brunswick, 1968)
- The Board of Directors Annual Report (Dot, 1968)
- Basie Straight Ahead (Dot, 1968)
- How About This (Paramount, 1968)
- Standing Ovation (Dot, 1969)
- Basic Basie (MPS, 1969)
- Basie on the Beatles (Happy Tiger, 1969)
- High Voltage (MPS, 1970)
- Basie Jam (Pablo, 1973)
- Mostly Blues...and Some Others (Pablo, 1983)

With Billy Butler

- Don't Be That Way (Black & Blue, 1976)

With Benny Carter

- Wonderland (Pablo, 1976 [1986])

With the Kenny Clarke/Francy Boland Big Band

- Sax No End (SABA, 1967)

With Arnett Cobb

- Blow Arnett, Blow (Prestige, 1959) – also released as Go Power!!! (Prestige, 1970)

With Gene "Mighty Flea" Conners

- Coming Home (Black & Blue, 1976)

With Wild Bill Davis

- All Right OK You Win (Black & Blue, 1976)

With Harry Edison

- Just Friends (Black & Blue, 1975)
- Edison's Lights (Pablo, 1976)

With Red Garland

- The Red Garland Trio + Eddie "Lockjaw" Davis (Moodsville, 1959)

With Dizzy Gillespie

- The Dizzy Gillespie Big 7 (Pablo, 1975)

With Al Grey

- Shades of Grey (Tangerine, 1965)

With Tiny Grimes

- Callin' the Blues (Prestige, 1958)

With Coleman Hawkins

- Night Hawk (Swingville, 1960)

With Jo Jones

- The Main Man (Pablo, 1977)

With Quincy Jones

- Golden Boy (Mercury, 1964)

With Al Smith

- Hear My Blues (Bluesville, 1959) – with Shirley Scott; also released as Blues Shout! (Prestige, 1964)

With Sonny Stitt

- The Matadors Meet the Bull (Roulette, 1965)

‘’’With Oscar Peterson’’’

- ‘’Oscar Peterson Jam at Montreux, 1977’’
