= Mildred Anderson =

American jazz musician

Mildred Anderson was an American jazz, blues and R&B singer.

In the early years of her career, Anderson worked with Albert Ammons and His Rhythm Kings, recording with them the song "Doin' the Boogie Woogie" on April 8, 1946. Later, she worked and recorded with Hot Lips Page in 1951 and Bill Doggett in 1953.

In 1960, Anderson recorded two albums for Bluesville, a subsidiary of the Prestige, her only LPs. The first, Person to Person, featured Eddie "Lockjaw" Davis' group with organist Shirley Scott. The second, No More in Life featured Al Sears on tenor. Commenting on No More in Life, Scott Yanow wrote "considering how well she sings on this set, it is strange that Mildred Anderson would have no further opportunities to lead her own albums."
