= Ray Bryant Trio =

Ray Bryant Trio can refer to two albums released by pianist Ray Bryant:

- Ray Bryant Trio (1956 album), released on Epic Records
- Ray Bryant Trio (1957 album), released on Prestige Records
