= Johnny Letman =

American jazz musician

Johnny Letman (September 6, 1917, McCormick, South Carolina – July 17, 1992) was an American jazz trumpeter.

Letman played early in his career in midwest bands, including those of Jerry Valentine, Scatman Crothers, and Jimmy Raschelle. Moving to Chicago in the middle of the 1930s, he worked with Delbert Bright, Bob Tinsley, Johnny Lang, Nat King Cole (1938), Horace Henderson (1941–42), and Red Saunders (1942). He spent a year or so in Detroit, playing with Teddy Buckner and John Kirby, then moved to New York City in 1944. His credits there included Phil Moore, Lucky Millinder (1945), Cab Calloway (1947–49), Milt Buckner, and Count Basie (1951).

Letman did extensive work as a studio musician and in Broadway shows throughout the 1950s and 1960s. He worked both in and outside of jazz music, and his associations in these decades include Joe Thomas, Stuff Smith, Chubby Jackson, Panama Francis, Dick Wellstood, Hal Singer, Sam Taylor, Eddie Condon, Wilbur De Paris, and Claude Hopkins. In 1968, he played with Milt Buckner and Tiny Grimes in Paris. In the 1970s, he played with Lionel Hampton, Cozy Cole, and Earl Hines. In 1985-86 he led the New Orleans Blues Serenaders, including on a tour of Europe.

== Discography ==
=== As leader ===
- The Many Angles of John Letman (Bethlehem, 1960)
- A Funky Day in Paris (Black and Blue, 1968)
- I'm Shooting High with Red Richards, George Kelly, Leonard Gaskin, Ronnie Cole (Sackville, 1988)

=== As guest ===
- Bernard Addison, High in a Basement (77 Records, 1961)
- Milt Buckner & Hal Singer, Milt and Hal (Black and Blue, 1968)
- Cab Calloway, Jumpin Jive (CBS Records, 1984)
- Buck Clayton, A Swingin' Dream (Stash, 1989)
- Vic Dickenson, Mainstream (Atlantic, 1958)
- Lionel Hampton, Dizzy Spells (Jazz Time 1993)
- Earl Hines and Marva Josie, Jazz Is His Old Lady... and My Old Man (Catalyst, 1977)
- Chubby Jackson, Chubby Jackson Discovers Maria Marshall (Crown, 1961)
- Stuff Smith, Sweet Swingin' Stuff (20th Fox 1959)
- Sammy Price, Just Right (Black and Blue, 1993)

== Other sources ==
- Scott Yanow, Johnny Letman at AllMusic
- Dictionnaire du Jazz (Philippe Carles, Paris, 1988)
