= After Glow (Carmen McRae album) =

Studio album by Carmen McRae
- Released: 1957
- Recorded: March 6 & April 18, 1957; New York City
- Genre: Vocal jazz; lounge
- Length: 37:43
- Label: Decca DL-8583

Carmen McRae chronology
Boy Meets Girl (1957)	After Glow (1957)	Mad About the Man (1958)

After Glow is a 1957 album by jazz singer Carmen McRae released on Decca Records, her fifth on that label. Recorded in two studio sessions with just a rhythm section, McRae herself alternates on piano with Ronnell Bright on the first date; on April 18 Ray Bryant plays piano.

== Track listing ==
1. "I Can't Escape from You" (Leo Robin, Richard Whiting) – 3:35
2. "Guess Who I Saw Today" (Murray Grand, Elisse Boyd) – 3:35
3. "My Funny Valentine" (Richard Rodgers, Lorenz Hart) – 3:35
4. "It's the Little Things That Mean So Much" (Harold Adamson, Teddy Wilson) – 3:18
5. "I'm Thru with Love" (Matty Malneck, Fud Livingston, Gus Kahn) – 4:09
6. "Nice Work If You Can Get It" (George Gershwin, Ira Gershwin) – 2:33
7. "East of the Sun (and West of the Moon)" (Brooks Bowman) – 2:15
8. "Exactly Like You" (Jimmy McHugh, Dorothy Fields) – 2:09
9. "All My Life" (Sam H. Stept, Sidney Mitchell) – 4:19
10. "Between the Devil and the Deep Blue Sea" (Harold Arlen, Ted Koehler) – 2:30
11. "Dream of Life" (Luther Henderson Jr., Carmen McRae) – 4:00
12. "Perdido" (Juan Tizol, Hans Lengsfelder, Ervin Drake) – 2:15

== Personnel ==
- Carmen McRae – vocals, piano on tracks 1, 4, 8 and 12 (session of March 6, 1957)
- Ronnell Bright – piano on 2, 3, 7 and 11 (March 6, 1957)
- Ray Bryant – piano on 5, 6, 9 and 10 (April 18, 1957)
- Ike Isaacs – double bass
- Specs Wright – drums
