= Alone with the Blues =

Alone with the Blues may refer to:

- Alone with the Blues (Ray Bryant album) recorded in 1958
- Alone with the Blues (Red Garland album) recorded in 1960
