= Oliver Jackson (musician) =

American jazz musician (1933–1994)

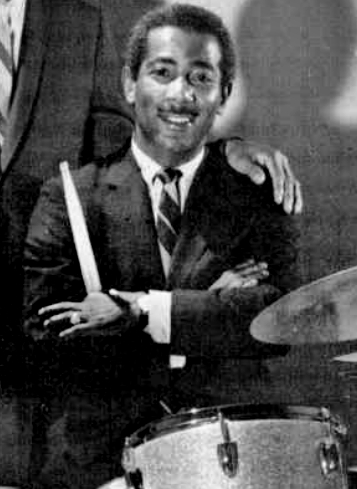
- Jackson in a 1968 DownBeat publicity photo

Background information
- Born: April 28, 1933; Detroit, Michigan, U.S.
- Died: May 29, 1994 (aged 61) New York City, New York, U.S.
- Genre: Jazz
- Occupation: Musician
- Instrument: Drums

Oliver Jackson (April 28, 1933 – May 29, 1994), also known as Bops Junior, was an American jazz drummer.

== Biography ==
Jackson was born in Detroit, Michigan, on 28 April 1933, where he played in the 1940s with Thad Jones, Tommy Flanagan, and Wardell Gray, and had a variety show with Eddie Locke called Bop & Locke.

After working with Yusef Lateef from 1954 until 1956, he moved to New York, where he played regularly at the Metropole in 1957 and 1958. Following this, he worked with Teddy Wilson, Charlie Shavers (1959–61), Buck Clayton, Benny Goodman (1962), Lionel Hampton (1962–64), Kenny Burrell, Earl Hines (1964–70 intermittently) and the JPJ Quartet with Budd Johnson. Jackson was mentored by, and lived for two years with, Earl Hines.

Later in life he played with Sy Oliver (1975–80), Oscar Peterson, and George Wein's Newport All-Stars. As a bandleader, Jackson led a 1961 date in Switzerland, and recorded at least five albums for Black & Blue Records between 1977 and 1984.

His brother, bassist Ali Jackson, performed with him both at the beginning and towards the end of their careers. His nephew, Ali Jackson Jr., is a jazz drummer.

Jackson died from heart failure in New York City at Manhattan's Lenox Hill Hospital. He was 61.

== Discography ==
=== As leader ===
- 1984: Billy's Bounce (Black & Blue)

=== As sideman ===
With Ray Alexander

- Rain In June (Nerus Records, 1992)

With Gene Ammons

- Bad! Bossa Nova (Prestige, 1962)

With Ray Bryant

- Ray Bryant Plays (Signature, 1959)
- Little Susie (Columbia, 1960)

With Kenny Burrell

- The Tender Gender (Cadet, 1966)

With Buck Clayton

- One for Buck (Columbia, 1961)

With Eddie "Lockjaw" Davis

- Jaws Strikes Again (Black & Blue, 1976)

With Dexter Gordon

- Dexter Gordon with Junior Mance at Montreux (Prestige, 1970)

With Johnny Hodges

- Triple Play (RCA Victor, 1967)

With Major Holley and Slam Stewart

- Shut Yo' Mouth! (1981)

With Illinois Jacquet

- The Blues; That's Me! (Prestige, 1969)

With Etta Jones

- Love Shout (Prestige, 1963)

With Paul Gonsalves

- Ellingtonia Moods and Blues (RCA Victor, 1960)

With Hank Jones

- I Remember You (Black & Blue, 1977)

With King Curtis

- The New Scene of King Curtis (New Jazz, 1960)
- Soul Meeting (Prestige, 1960)
- King Curtis & Champion Jack Dupree: Blues at Montreux (Atlantic, 1973)

With Yusef Lateef

- Jazz and the Sounds of Nature (Savoy, 1957)
- Prayer to the East (Savoy, 1957)
- The Sounds of Yusef (Prestige, 1957)
- Other Sounds (New Jazz, 1957)
- Cry! - Tender (New Jazz, 1957)

With Gildo Mahones

- I'm Shooting High (Prestige, 1963)

With Billy Mitchell

- A Little Juicy (Smash, 1963)

With Joe Newman

- Jive at Five (Swingville, 1960)

With Billy Strayhorn

- Cue for Saxophone (Felsted, 1959)

With Joe Thomas and Jay McShann

- Blowin' in from K.C. (Uptown, 1983)

== Bibliography ==
- Oliver Jackson at Allmusic
- Watrous, Peter (June 3, 1994). "Oliver Jackson, 61, Jazz Drummer Noted For an Elegant Style". The New York Times.
