= Montreux '77 =

Montreux '77 may refer to:

- Montreux '77 (Count Basie album)
- Montreux '77 (Ray Bryant album)
- Montreux '77 (Ella Fitzgerald album)
- Montreux '77 (Tommy Flanagan album)
- Montreux '77 – Live, an album by Joe Pass
