= Mad About the Man =

Studio album by Carmen McRae
- Released: 1958
- Recorded: June 18–20, 1957
- Venue: New York
- Genre: Vocal jazz
- Length: 35:16
- Label: Decca DL-8662

Carmen McRae chronology
After Glow (1957)	Mad About the Man (1958)	Carmen for Cool Ones (1958)

Mad About the Man is a 1958 album by American jazz singer Carmen McRae, arranged by Jack Pleis, of songs written by Noël Coward.

== Reception ==
Professional ratings
Review scores
Source	Rating
Allmusic	4/5 stars

Allmusic awarded the album four stars and reviewer Jason Ankeny wrote that the combination of McRae and Coward was a "perfect match, bringing together two witty, sophisticated talents capable of remarkable expressions of raw emotional power." Ankeny also wrote that McRae was "at the absolute top of her game" and interpreted the songs with "effortless style and grace."

== Track listing ==
1. "I'll See You Again" – 2:42
2. "Zigeuner" – 2:41
3. "Some Day I'll Find You" – 2:57
4. "Room with a View" – 2:45
5. "World Weary" – 2:56
6. "I Can't Do Anything at All" – 3:00
7. "Mad About the Boy" – 4:11
8. "Poor Little Rich Girl" – 3:04
9. "I'll Follow My Secret Heart" – 2:45
10. "If Love Were All" – 2:51
11. "Why Does Love Get in the Way?" – 2:35
12. "Never Again" – 2:49

All songs written by Noël Coward.

== Personnel ==
- Carmen McRae – vocals
- Jack Pleis – arranger
- Charlie Shavers – trumpet
- Ike Isaacs – double bass
- Ray Bryant – piano
- Specs Wright – drums
