= Ray Bryant Plays =

Studio album by Ray Bryant
- Released: 1960
- Recorded: October 29 and November 5–6, 1959
- Studio: New York City
- Genre: Jazz
- Length: 45:47
- Label: Signature; SM/SS 6008
- Producer: Bob Thiele

Ray Bryant chronology
Alone with the Blues (1958)	Ray Bryant Plays (1960)	Little Susie (1959)

Ray Bryant Plays is an album recorded by American jazz pianist Ray Bryant recorded in 1959 for the Signature label.

== Reception ==
Professional ratings
Review scores
Source	Rating
Allmusic	3/5 stars

Allmusic awarded the album 3 stars calling it "a strong sampling of Ray Bryant's accessible playing during his early period".

== Track listing ==
1. "Delauney's Dilemma" (John Lewis) – 2:35
2. "Blue Monk" (Thelonious Monk) – 5:00
3. "Misty" (Erroll Garner) – 2:59
4. "Sneaking Around" (Ray Bryant) – 3:46
5. "Now's the Time" (Charlie Parker) – 4:00
6. "Wheatleigh Hall" (Dizzy Gillespie) – 3:55
7. "Doodlin'" (Horace Silver) – 4:05
8. "A Hundred Dreams from Now" (Duke Ellington) – 3:20
9. "Bags' Groove" (Milt Jackson) – 5:34
10. "Walkin'" (Richard Carpenter) – 3:08
11. "Take the "A" Train" (Billy Strayhorn) – 3:50
12. "Whisper Not" (Benny Golson) – 3:35
- Recorded in NYC on October 29 (tracks 1 & 5–7), November 5, (tracks 2, 3, 10 & 12), and November 6, 1959 (tracks 4, 8, 9 & 11)

== Personnel ==
- Ray Bryant – piano
- Tommy Bryant – bass
- Oliver Jackson – drums
