= Sittin' In =

Sittin' In may refer to:

- Sittin' In (Loggins and Messina album), 1971
- Sittin' In (Dizzy Gillespie album), 1957
- Sittin' in With, a jazz label which issued some recordings under the name Sittin' In
