= Invitation (song) =

1952 song by Bronisław Kaper

"Invitation" is a song by Bronisław Kaper with lyrics by Paul Francis Webster, which originally appeared in the film A Life of Her Own (1950). A Life of Her Own was nominated for a Golden Globe award for Best Score, but "Invitation" became a jazz standard after it was reused as the theme in the 1952 film Invitation. Tony Thomas notes that it was selected for the film for its degree of poignance. It is considered Kaper's second best known song, after "On Green Dolphin Street". JazzStandards.com describes it as a "lush and haunting score" and notes that it is most associated with John Coltrane, who recorded it in 1958. Howard Morgen, who arranged it for guitar, writes that the "haunting" tune has "long been recognized by jazz players for its potential as an interesting mood piece" and "still sounds fresh and contemporary today".

George Shearing arranged the song for piano, and Frank Mantooth arranged a Latin version of it. Dakota Staton covered it on her 1958 album Dynamic! In 1961, Rosemary Clooney recorded the song with a lush arrangement by Nelson Riddle and featured it as the first track on her album Love, where the lyrics acquired special poignancy, given that Clooney and Riddle, both married, were having a doomed affair at the time.

It has since been recorded by the vocalists Carmen McRae, Freddy Cole, Andy Bey, and Patricia Barber; pianists Bill Evans, Randy Halberstadt, Steve Kuhn, and Renee Rosnes; saxophonists John Coltrane, Joe Henderson, Herb Geller, Vincent Herring, Sahib Shihab, and Don Braden; trumpeters Roy Hargrove and Brian Lynch; bassist Ray Drummond; and vibraphonist Cal Tjader (on his album Latin Kick), among others. David Frackenpohl arranged a version for guitar, which was published in the 2004 Mel Bay book Jazz Guitar Standards: Chord Melody Solos.

Jazz critic Ted Gioia notes the following:

"Invitation" is an example of the peculiar process of "survival of the fittest" that has shaped the jazz repertoire. ... [It] has survived solely because jazz musicians have enjoyed playing it. This song was probably too complex for the mass market in 1952, and it certainly is far beyond what passes for popular music today. During the course of its 48-bar form, "Invitation" uses all 12 tones as a chord root at least once, and the harmonies are thick with ... higher extensions. ... "Invitation" is still inviting enough to keep the jazz musicians interested, and is likely to hold on to this constituency for some time to come.

== Some significant recordings ==
- Les Brown – vocal by Jo Ann Greer. 78 rpm single for Coral Records 61047, backed with Sitting in the Sun, recorded in Hollywood (1953)
- George Wallington – George Wallington with Strings (1953)
- John Young – Young John Young (1956)
- Cal Tjader Sextet – Latin Kick (1956)
- Dakota Staton – Crazy He Calles Me (1959)
- John Coltrane – Standard Coltrane (recorded 1958, released 1962)
- The Four Freshmen – The Four Freshmen and Five Guitars (1959)
- Buddy Collette – At the Cinema! (1959)
- Chris Connor – 45 rpm single for Atlantic Records Atl 2073 (1959)
- Caterina Valente – Super-Fonics (1961)
- Johnny "Hammond" Smith – Stimulation (1961)
- Rosemary Clooney – Love (recorded 1961, released 1963)
- Art Blakey and The Jazz Messengers – !!!!! Impulse! Art Blakey! Jazz Messengers! !!!!! (recorded 1961, released 1970)
- Dinah Washington – I Wanna Be Loved (1962)
- Junior Mance – The Soul of Hollywood (1962)
- Quincy Jones – The Quintessence (1962)
- Sarah Vaughan – You're Mine You (1962) (arranged by Quincy Jones)
- Ray Bryant – Hollywood Jazz Beat (1962)
- Milt Jackson – Invitation (1962)
- Kenny Burrell – Lotsa Bossa Nova! (Kapp Records KL1326 (1963)
- Roy Haynes – People (Pacific Jazz PJ(S)82) (1964)
- Lucky Thompson – Lucky Strikes (1964)
- The Three Sounds – Three Moods (1964)
- Dorothy Ashby – The Fantastic Jazz Harp of Dorothy Ashby (1965)
- Sahib Shihab – Companionship (recorded 1965, released 1971
- Ahmad Jamal – Rhapsody (1965)
- Kai Winding – More Brass (1966)
- Joe Henderson – If You're Not Part of the Solution, You're Part of the Problem (recorded 1970, released 2004 as part of reissue At the Lighthouse)
- Archie Shepp – Doodlin' (recorded 1970, released 1978)
- Stan Getz – Dynasty (1971)
- Tony Bennett – The Good Things in Life (1972)
- Jimmy Heath – The Gap Sealer (1972)
- Vince Wallace – Live! At The Studio Cafe (1972)
- Charles McPherson – Today's Man (1973)
- The Singers Unlimited – Invitation (MPS Records 68.107) (1973)
- Al Haig – Invitation (1974)
- Andrew Hill – Invitation (1974)
- Bill Evans and Eddie Gómez – Intuition (1974)
- Walter Bishop Jr. – Valley Land (1974)
- Lee Konitz – Oleo (1974)
- Takao Uematsu – Straight Ahead (DEEP JAZZ REALITY/OCTAVE-LAB, 1977)
- Jaco Pastorius – Invitation (1983)
- Dexter Gordon – Something Different (1987)
- Phil Woods – An Affair To Remember (1995)
- Moe Koffman – Devil's Brew (1996)
- Buddy DeFranco with Dave McKenna – You Must Believe In Swing (Concord Jazz – CCD-4756-2) (1997)
- Diane Schuur – Music Is My Life (1999)
- Boz Scaggs – Swing Low (2008)
- Christie Dashiell – Journey in Black (2023)
