= Sound Ray =

Studio album by Ray Bryant
- Released: 1969
- Recorded: June 26–27, 1969
- Studio: Ter Mar Studios, Chicago, IL
- Genre: Jazz
- Length: 39:11
- Label: Cadet; LP/LPS-830
- Producer: Richard Evans

Ray Bryant chronology
Up Above the Rock (1968)	Sound Ray (1969)	MCMLXX (1970)

Sound Ray is an album by pianist Ray Bryant recorded and released by Cadet Records in 1969.

Professional ratings
Review scores
Source	Rating
AllMusic	3/5 stars

== Track listing ==
All compositions by Ray Bryant except where noted

1. "A Song for My Father" (Horace Silver) – 5:23
2. "Con Alma" (Dizzy Gillespie) – 4:14
3. "Scarborough Fair" (Simon H Garfunkel) – 4:36
4. "Stick With It" – 5:09
5. "Broadway" (Billy Bird, Henri Woode, Teddy McRae) – 5:30
6. "Li'l Darlin'" (Neal Hefti) – 5:09
7. "The Look of Love" (Burt Bacharach, Hal David) – 5:30
8. "Sound Ray" (Bryant, Richard Evans) – 3:40

== Personnel ==
- Ray Bryant – piano
- Jimmy Rowser – bass
- Freddie Waits – drums
