= 1970 (disambiguation) =

1970 was a common year starting on Thursday of the Gregorian calendar.

1970 may also refer to:

- "1970" (Boris song)
- "1970" (The Stooges song), also known as "I Feel Alright", from the album Fun House
- "1970" (Our Friends in the North), a television episode
- MCMLXX (album) an album by Ray Bryant
