= Madison Time =

Studio album by Ray Bryant Combo
- Released: 1960
- Recorded: March 16, 1959, March 20, 1960 and July 12, 1960; New York City
- Genre: Jazz
- Length: 36:15
- Label: Columbia; CL 1476

Ray Bryant chronology
Little Susie (1959)	Madison Time (1960)	Con Alma (1961)

Madison Time is an album recorded by American jazz pianist Ray Bryant recorded in 1959 and 1960 for the Columbia label. The album was released following the success of the Madison dance craze single "The Madison Time" which reached number 30 on the Billboard chart and number 5 on the R&B chart. The single also featured in the soundtrack to the 1988 film Hairspray.

== Reception ==
Professional ratings
Review scores
Source	Rating
Allmusic	3/5 stars
The Penguin Guide to Jazz Recordings	3/4 stars

Allmusic awarded the album 3 stars calling it "Ray Bryant's most popular album".

== Track listing ==
All compositions by Ray Bryant except as indicated

1. "The Madison Time - Part I" (Ray Bryant, Eddie Morrison) - 3:06
2. "The Madison Time - Part II" (Bryant, Morrison) - 2:48
3. "Centerpiece" (Harry Edison) - 4:22
4. "Split T - Part I" - 4:02
5. "Split T - Part II" - 5:20
6. "Hit It! - Part I" - 3:15
7. "Hit It! - Part II" - 4:10
8. "Young Buddy" - 4:03
9. "The Huckle-Buck" (Roy Alfred & Andy Gibson) - 5:09
- Recorded on March 16, 1959 (tracks 1 & 2), March 20, 1960 (tracks 3, 8 & 9), and July 12, 1960 (tracks 4–7)

== Personnel ==
- Ray Bryant - piano
- Harry Edison - trumpet
- Al Grey (tracks 4–7), Urbie Green (tracks 1 & 2), Benny Morton (tracks 3, 8 & 9) - trombone
- Buddy Tate - tenor saxophone
- Tommy Bryant - bass
- Billy English (tracks 1 & 2), Jimmy Griffin (tracks 3, 8 & 9), Dave Pochonet (tracks 4–7) - drums
- Eddie Morrison - caller (tracks 1, 4 & 6)
