= Jimmy Rowser =

American jazz musician (1926–2004)

James Edward Rowser (April 18, 1926 in Philadelphia – June 24, 2004 in Teaneck) was an American jazz double-bassist.

== Career ==
Born in Philadelphia in 1926, Rowser learned to play piano and bass as a youth. He played with the house band at Philadelphia's Blue Note club, accompanying touring musicians such as Charlie Parker, Sonny Clark, Hank Mobley, Kenny Dorham, Art Taylor, Cannonball Adderley, Miles Davis, Billie Holiday, J.J. Johnson, Anita O'Day and Kai Winding.

In the late 1950s, Rowser played with Dinah Washington, Maynard Ferguson, Lee Morgan, and Red Garland. He was active in New York in the early 1960s with Junior Mance, Ray Bryant, Herb Ellis, and Illinois Jacquet, and toured internationally with Benny Goodman and Friedrich Gulda in 1963–1964. Later in the 1960s, Rowser worked with Al Cohn and Zoot Sims and then with Les McCann; he remained with McCann well into the 1970s. In the 1980s, Rowser played with Bryant once more and also with Hilton Ruiz.

Rowser returned to school in the 1980s, receiving a bachelor's and master's from Lehman College, and then taught music in New Jersey in the 1990s.

== Discography ==
With Ray Bryant

- Dancing the Big Twist (Columbia, 1961)
- Live at Basin Street East (Sue, 1964)
- Cold Turkey (Sue, 1964)
- Lonesome Traveler (Cadet, 1966)
- The Ray Bryant Touch (Cadet, 1967)
- Sound Ray (Cadet, 1969)
- Potpourri (Pablo, 1981)

With Maynard Ferguson

- A Message from Birdland (Roulette, 1959)
- Maynard Ferguson Plays Jazz for Dancing (Roulette, 1959)
- Swingin' My Way Through College (Roulette, 1959)
- A Message from Newport (Roulette, 1960)

With Red Garland

- Red Garland at the Prelude (Prestige, 1959)
- Lil' Darlin' (Status, 1965)
- Red Garland Live! (Prestige, 1965)
- Satin Doll (Prestige, 1983)

With Les McCann

- What's Going On (Atlantic, 1972)
- Invitation to Openness (Atlantic, 1972)
- Talk to the People (Atlantic, 1972)
- Layers(Atlantic, 1973)
- Live at Montreux (Atlantic, 1973)
- Another Beginning (Atlantic, 1974)
- Hustle to Survive (Atlantic, 1975)
- River High River Low (Atlantic, 1976)
- Change, Change, Change (ABC/Impulse!, 1977)
- Music Lets Me Be (ABC/Impulse!, 1977)
- The Man (A&M, 1978)

With others

- Herb Ellis, The Midnight Roll (Epic, 1962)
- Friedrich Gulda, Gulda Jazz (Amadeo, 1964)
- Eddie Harris & Les McCann, Second Movement (Atlantic, 1971)
- Illinois Jacquet, Illinois Jacquet (Epic, 1963)
- Junior Mance, Big Chief! (Jazzland, 1961)
- Blue Mitchell, Booty (Mainstream, 1974)
- Lee Morgan & Thad Jones, Minor Strain (Roulette, 1990)
- Buddy Montgomery, This Rather Than That (ABC/Impulse!, 1969)
- Hilton Ruiz, Doin' It Right (Novus 1990)
- Dinah Washington, September in the Rain (Mercury, 1961)
