= Have Trumpet, Will Excite! =

Studio album by Dizzy Gillespie
- Released: 1959
- Recorded: February 17–18 & 20, 1959
- Genre: Jazz
- Length: 40:06
- Label: Verve; MG V-8313
- Producer: Norman Granz

Dizzy Gillespie chronology
| The Ebullient Mr. Gillespie (1959) | Have Trumpet, Will Excite! (1959) | The Greatest Trumpet of Them All (1960) |

Professional ratings
Review scores
| Source | Rating |
|---|---|
| AllMusic | 4/5 stars |
| The Rolling Stone Jazz Record Guide | 4/5 stars |
| The Penguin Guide to Jazz Recordings | 3/4 stars |

Have Trumpet, Will Excite! is a 1959 studio album by American jazz trumpeter Dizzy Gillespie.

== Reception ==
The Penguin Guide to Jazz rates the album three stars and states that "there's a case for saying that this is one of the best of all Gillespie's small-group albums: the playing has a steely refinement that makes the audacious moments stand out even further, the relatively neutral setting puts a more decisive face on the trumpet choruses, and it's a rare chance to hear Gillespie work through what might have been a hard-bop programme of standard tunes."

Ronnie Lankford's AllMusic review says of the album, "Gillespie and the band, seem to say, 'We can play old swing tunes, but wouldn't it be cool if we turned them inside out?' This approach, along with sharp solos, gives the material an exciting edge."

== Track listing ==
=== Side A ===
1. "My Heart Belongs to Daddy" (Cole Porter) – 6:02
2. "My Man" (Jacques Charles, Channing Pollack, Albert Willemetz, Maurice Yvain) – 4:19
3. "Moonglow" (Eddie DeLange, Will Hudson, Irving Mills) – 6:24
4. "St. Louis Blues" (W.C. Handy) – 5:56

=== Side B ===
1. "Woody 'n' You" (Dizzy Gillespie) – 6:23
2. "Wrap Your Troubles in Dreams (and Dream Your Troubles Away)" (Harry Barris, Ted Koehler, Billy Moll) – 7:17
3. "There Is No Greater Love" (Isham Jones, Marty Symes) – 3:26
4. "I Found a Million Dollar Baby (in a Five and Ten Cent Store)" (Al Dixon, Billy Rose, Harry Warren) – 6:59

=== CD bonus tracks ===
9. "There Is No Greater Love" – 3:29
10. "There Is No Greater Love" – 3:35
11. "There Is No Greater Love" – 4:02
12. "I Found a Million Dollar Baby (in a Five and Ten Cent Store)" – 6:37

== Personnel ==
- Dizzy Gillespie – trumpet
- Les Spann – guitar, flute
- Junior Mance – piano
- Lex Humphries – drums
- Sam Jones – bass
- Carlos "Patato" Valdes – conga (track 5)
