= Up Above the Rock =

Studio album by Ray Bryant
- Released: 1968
- Recorded: September 1968
- Studio: RCA Studios, New York City, NY
- Genre: Jazz
- Length: 35:17
- Label: Cadet; LP/LPS-818
- Producer: Richard Evans

Ray Bryant chronology
Take a Bryant Step (1967)	Up Above the Rock (1968)	Sound Ray (1969)

Up Above the Rock is an album by pianist Ray Bryant recorded and released by Cadet Records in 1968.

Professional ratings
Review scores
Source	Rating
AllMusic	3/5 stars

== Track listing ==
All compositions by Ray Bryant except where noted

1. "Up Above the Rock" – 2:59
2. "Dag Nab It" (Bryant, Richard Evans) – 3:33
3. "Quizás, Quizás, Quizás" (Osvaldo Farrés) – 3:18
4. "If I Were a Carpenter" (Tim Hardin) – 2:48
5. "Little Green Apples" (Bobby Russell) – 3:21
6. "I Say a Little Prayer" (Burt Bacharach, Hal David) – 4:45
7. "After Hours" (Avery Parrish) – 3:47
8. "Where the Wind Blows" – 4:33
9. "Five, Six and Seven" (Howard Reynolds) – 3:20
10. "Mrs. Robinson" (Paul Simon) – 2:53

== Personnel ==
- Ray Bryant – piano
- Dobbie Hiques, Snooky Young (tracks 1–6), Danny Moore (tracks 7–9) – trumpet
- Ron Carter – bass
- Grady Tate – drums
