= Dancing the Big Twist =

Studio album by Ray Bryant and His Combo
- Released: November 1961
- Recorded: December 27, 1960, and October 23 & 26, 1961
- Studio: Columbia 30th Street Studio, New York City
- Genre: Jazz
- Label: Columbia; CL-1746/CS-8546
- Producer: John Hammond

Ray Bryant chronology
Con Alma (1960)	Dancing the Big Twist (1961)	Hollywood Jazz Beat (1962)

Dancing the Big Twist is an album by pianist Ray Bryant released on Columbia Records in 1961 to capitalise on the Twist dance craze.

== Reception ==
Professional ratings
Review scores
Source	Rating
Allmusic	3/5 stars

The Allmusic review stated "This session will appeal to those who favor Bryant's dance hit of the era, 'Madison Time'".

== Track listing ==
1. "Twist City" (Matthew Gee) – 5:45
2. "Just a Little Bit of Twist" (Don Covay) – 2:46
3. "Big Susie" (Ray Bryant) – 5:22
4. "Twist On" (Bryant) – 4:46
5. "Twistin' on a Cat's Paw" (BuddyTate) – 5:00
6. "Mo-Lasses" (Joe Newman) – 5:15
7. "Fast Twist" (Harry Edison, Bryant) – 2:15
8. "Do That Twist (Early In The Morning)" (Gee) – 5:31
- Recorded at Columbia Records, 30th Street Studio, NYC., on December 27, 1960 (track 7), October 23, 1961 (tracks 2, 3 & 8) and October 26, 1961 (tracks 1 & 4–6)

== Personnel ==
- Ray Bryant – piano
- Harry Edison (track 7), Pat Jenkins (tracks 1–6 & 8), Joe Newman (tracks 1–6 & 8) – trumpet
- Matthew Gee – trombone (tracks 1–6 & 8)
- Ben Richardson – baritone saxophone (track 7)
- Buddy Tate – tenor saxophone
- Bill Lee (track 7), Jimmy Rowser (tracks 1–6 & 8) – bass
- Gus Johnson (track 7), Mickey Roker (tracks 1–6 & 8) – drums
- Ray Barretto – congas (track 7)
- Don Covay – vocals (track 2)
