= Lonesome Traveler (album) =

Studio album by Ray Bryant
- Released: 1966
- Recorded: September 1 & 8, 1966
- Studio: RCA Studios, New York City, NY
- Genre: Jazz
- Length: 39:35
- Label: Cadet; LP/LPS-778
- Producer: Esmond Edwards

Ray Bryant chronology
Gotta Travel On (1966)	Lonesome Traveler (1966)	Slow Freight (1967)

Lonesome Traveler is an album by pianist Ray Bryant recorded and released by Cadet Records in 1966.

== Chart performance ==
The album debuted on Billboard magazine's Top LP's chart in the issue dated May 13, 1965, peaking at No. 193 during a three-week run on the chart.

== Reception ==
Professional ratings
Review scores
Source	Rating
AllMusic	3/5 stars

Flophouse magazine stated: "Lonesome Traveler is one of pianist Ray Bryant’s grittiest recordings and his second album on Cadet – the subsidiary of Chicago blues and r&b label Chess. ...By 1966, Bryant, a pianist with a lot of gospel and blues feeling and an uncommonly firm, propulsive left hand had a satisfactory decade to look back upon".

== Track listing ==
All compositions by Ray Bryant, except where indicated.

1. "Lonesome Traveler" (Lee Hays) – 3:14
2. "'Round Midnight" (Thelonious Monk, Cootie Williams, Bernie Hanighen) – 6:03
3. "These Boots Were Made for Walkin'" (Lee Hazlewood) – 3:36
4. "Willow Weep for Me" (Ann Ronell) – 5:14
5. "The Blue Scimitar" (Esmond Edwards) – 4:22
6. "Gettin' Loose" – 3:42
7. "Wild Is the Wind" (Dimitri Tiomkin, Ned Washington) – 4:30
8. "Cubano Chant" – 4:10
9. "Brother This 'N' Sister That" – 4:43

== Personnel ==
- Ray Bryant – piano
- Snooky Young – trumpet
- Clark Terry – trumpet, flugelhorn
- Jimmy Rowser (tracks 2, 4, 5 & 8–9), Richard Davis (tracks 1, 3 & 6) – bass
- Freddie Waits – drums

== Charts ==
Chart (1967)	Peak position
US Billboard Top LPs	193
