= Bobby Donaldson =

American musician

Robert Stanley "Bobby" Donaldson (November 29, 1922, Boston – 1971) was an American jazz and R&B drummer.

After playing locally in the early 1940s, Donaldson played with Russell Procope while serving in the Army in New York City. In 1946–47 Donaldson worked with Cat Anderson, and following this played with Edmond Hall, Andy Kirk, Lucky Millinder, Buck Clayton, Red Norvo, and Sy Oliver/Louis Armstrong. He was a prolific session musician for much of the 1950s and 1960s, playing with Helen Merrill, Ruby Braff, Mel Powell, Benny Goodman, Count Basie, Bobby Jaspar, Herbie Mann, André Hodeir, Kenny Burrell, Lonnie Johnson, Frank Wess, Willis Jackson, and Johnny Hodges.

Early in his career he played with the Boston Symphony.

== Discography ==
=== As leader ===
- Dixieland New York (World Wide, 1958)
- Dixieland Jazz Party (Savoy, 1959)
- Jazz Unlimited (Jazz Unlimited 1961)

=== As sideman ===
- Mildred Anderson, No More in Life (Prestige Bluesville, 1961)
- Count Basie, A Night at Count Basie's (Vanguard, 1955)
- Ruby Braff, Hustlin' and Bustlin (Storyville, 1956)
- Solomon Burke, If You Need Me (Atlantic, 1963)
- Kenny Burrell & Bill Jennings & Tiny Grimes, Guitar Soul (Status, 1965)
- Ray Bryant, Groove House (Sue, 1963)
- Charlie Byrd, Jazz Recital (Savoy, 1957)
- Buck Clayton, Just a Groove (Vanguard, 1973)
- Sam Cooke, Twistin' the Night Away (RCA Victor, 1962)
- Vic Dickenson & Urbie Green, Slidin Swing (Jazztone, 1957)
- Art Farmer, Ernie Royal, Trumpets All Out (Savoy, 1957)
- Curtis Fuller, Images of Curtis Fuller (Savoy, 1962)
- Benny Goodman, B.G. in Hi Fi (Capitol, 1955)
- Benny Goodman, B.G. in Hi Fi Part 2 (Capitol, 1955)
- John P. Hammond, Big City Blues (Vanguard, 1964)
- John P. Hammond, Mirrors (Vanguard, 1967)
- Coleman Hawkins, The Saxophone Section (World Wide, 1958)
- Eddie Heywood, The Touch of Eddie Heywood (RCA Victor, 1958)
- Eddie Heywood, Breezin' Along with the Breeze (Mercury, 1959)
- Eddie Heywood, Eddie Heywood at the Piano (Mercury, 1960)
- Andre Hodeir, American Jazzmen Play Andre Hodeir's Essais (Savoy, 1957)
- Willis Jackson, Neapolitan Nights (Prestige, 1963)
- Willis Jackson, Star Bag (Prestige, 1968)
- Lonnie Johnson, Blues by Lonnie Johnson (Prestige Bluesville, 1960)
- Johnny Hodges & Wild Bill Davis, Blue Rabbit (Verve, 1964)
- Etta Jones, Hollar! (Prestige, 1963)
- Etta Jones, Love Shout (Prestige, 1963)
- Etta Jones, The Jones Girl (King, 1958)
- Frankie Laine & Buck Clayton, Jazz Spectacular (Columbia, 1956)
- Michael Lessac, Sleep Faster, We Need the Pillow (Columbia, 1968)
- Herbie Mann & Bobby Jaspar, Flute Flight (Prestige, 1957)
- Herbie Mann & Bobby Jaspar, Flute Souffle (Prestige, 1957)
- Herbie Mann, Yardbird Suite (Savoy, 1957)
- Helen Merrill, Helen Merrill (EmArcy, 1954)
- Sam Most, I'm Nuts About the Most..Sam Most That Is! (Bethlehem, 1955)
- Esther Phillips, And I Love Him! (Atlantic, 1965)
- Mel Powell, Borderline (Vanguard, 1954)
- Mel Powell, Thigamagig (Vanguard, 1954)
- Mel Powell, Out on a Limb (Vanguard, 1955)
- The Rooftop Singers, Walk Right In! (Vanguard, 1963)
- A. K. Salim, Flute Suite (Savoy, 1957)
- Sarah Vaughan, !Viva! Vaughan (Mercury, 1964)
- Joe Venuti, Plays Gershwin (Golden Crest, 1960)
- Frank Wess, The Spirit of Charlie Parker (World Wide, 1958)
- Frank Wess, The Frank Wess Quartert (Moodsville, 1960)
- Bob Wilber, New Clarinet in Town (Classic Editions, 1960)
- The Three Playmates, The Three Playmates (Savoy, 1957)
