= Red Garland Live! =

Live album by Red Garland
- Released: 1965
- Recorded: October 2, 1959
- Venues: The Prelude Club, New York City
- Genre: Jazz
- Length: 33:39
- Label: New Jazz NJLP 8326
- Producer: Esmond Edwards

Red Garland chronology
Lil' Darlin' (1959)	Red Garland Live! (1965)	The Red Garland Trio + Eddie "Lockjaw" Davis (1959)

Red Garland Live! is a live album by American pianist, composer and bandleader Red Garland which was recorded in 1959 and released on the New Jazz label. The album was recorded at the Prelude Club at the same concert that produced Lil' Darlin' and Red Garland at the Prelude. The full three-set concert was issued as a two CD compilation in 2003 under the Red Garland at the Prelude name.

== Reception ==
Professional ratings
Review scores
Source	Rating
Allmusic	4.5/5 stars

The Allmusic site awarded the album 4½ stars. C. Michael Bailey from All About Jazz in reviewing the 2006 release of the complete Prelude recordings stated "There may be an argument that The Red Garland Trio at the Prelude is the last of the great Garland Trio recordings. The pianist performed and recorded sporadically until his death at 60 years old in 1984. But it is these Prelude sides illustrate Red Garland at top form in his craft".

== Track listing ==
All compositions by Red Garland except where noted

1. "Marie" (Irving Berlin) - 6:17
2. "Bohemian Blues" - 9:58
3. "One O'Clock Jump" (Count Basie) - 2:42
4. "A Foggy Day" (George Gershwin, Ira Gershwin) - 5:36
5. "Mr. Wonderful" (Jerry Bock, George David Weiss) - 9:06
- Recorded The Prelude Club in New York City on October 2, 1959

== Personnel ==
- Red Garland - piano
- Jimmy Rowser - bass
- Charles "Specs" Wright - drums
