= Red Alone =

Studio album by Red Garland
- Released: 1960
- Recorded: April 2, 1960
- Studio: Van Gelder Studio, Englewood Cliffs, NJ
- Genre: Jazz
- Length: 43:01
- Label: Moodsville; MVLP 3
- Producer: Esmond Edwards

Red Garland chronology
The Red Garland Trio + Eddie "Lockjaw" Davis (1959)	Red Alone (1960)	Alone with the Blues (1960)

Alternative cover
- 2004 CD reissue

Professional ratings
Review scores
Source	Rating
Allmusic	4.5/5 stars

Red Alone is a solo piano album by jazz musician Red Garland, recorded in 1960 and released the same year on Prestige Records, originally as part of the Moodsville series.

== Track listing ==
1. "When Your Lover Has Gone" (Einar Aaron Swan) - 6:45
2. "These Foolish Things (Remind Me of You)" (Jack Strachey, Holt Marvell, Harry Link) - 5:08
3. "My Last Affair" (Haven Johnson) - 3:39
4. "You Are Too Beautiful" (Richard Rodgers, Lorenz Hart) - 4:45
5. "I Got It Bad (And That Ain't Good)" (Duke Ellington, Paul Francis Webster) - 7:09
6. "The Nearness of You" (Hoagy Carmichael, Ned Washington) - 5:04
7. "Nancy (With the Laughing Face)" (Jimmy Van Heusen, Phil Silvers) - 5:25
8. "When I Fall in Love" (Victor Young, Edward Heyman) - 5:06

== Personnel ==
- Red Garland - piano
