= Gotta Travel On (album) =

Studio album by Ray Bryant
- Released: 1966
- Recorded: February 17–18, 1966
- Studio: RCA Studios, New York City, NY
- Genre: Jazz
- Length: 37:25
- Label: Cadet; LP/LPS-767
- Producer: Esmond Edwards

Ray Bryant chronology
Soul (1965)	Gotta Travel On (1966)	Lonesome Traveler (1967)

Gotta Travel On is an album by pianist Ray Bryant recorded and released by Cadet Records in 1966.

Professional ratings
Review scores
Source	Rating
AllMusic	3/5 stars

== Chart performance ==
The album debuted on Billboard magazine's Top LP's chart in the issue dated June 25, 1966, peaking at No. 111 during a twelve-week run on the chart.

== Track listing ==
All compositions by Ray Bryant except where noted

1. "Gotta Travel On" (Paul Clayton, Larry Ehrlich, Dave Lazer, Tom Six) – 4:27
2. "Erewhon" – 3:10
3. "Smack Dab in the Middle" (Chuck Calhoun) – 4:03
4. "Monkey Business" – 2:52
5. "All Things Are Possible" – 3:45
6. "It Was a Very Good Year" (Ervin Drake) – 4:01
7. "Bags' Groove" (Milt Jackson) – 5:31
8. "Midnight Stalking" – 4:15
9. "Little Soul Sister" – 5:21

== Charts ==
Chart (1966)	Peak position
US Billboard Top LPs	111

== Personnel ==
- Ray Bryant – piano
- Snooky Young – trumpet (tracks 2, 5, 6 & 9),
- Clark Terry – trumpet, flugelhorn (tracks 2, 5, 6 & 9)
- Walter Booker – bass
- Freddie Waits – drums
