= Jo Jones Trio =

Studio album by Jo Jones
- Released: 1959
- Recorded: March 1959
- Studio: New York City, NY
- Genre: Jazz
- Length: 39:27
- Label: Everest; LPBR 5023/SDBR 1023
- Producer: Raymond Scott

Jo Jones chronology
Jo Jones Plus Two (1958)	Jo Jones Trio (1959)	Vamp 'til Ready (1960)

Jo Jones Trio is an album recorded by drummer Jo Jones in 1959 and released by the Everest label.

== Reception ==
Professional ratings
Review scores
Source	Rating
AllMusic	4/5 stars
All About Jazz	4/5 stars

AllMusic reviewer Scott Yanow stated "Jo Jones is probably best known for his work with Count Basie, but his small-group dates as a leader, though overlooked, are also very rewarding. ... The trio is effortlessly swinging ... this 1959 LP treats the musicians with the respect they deserve". On All About Jazz, David Rickert wrote "The Jo Jones Trio, features his working unit of Ray Bryant and Tommy Bryant on a straightforward piano trio recording. Bryant utilizes a minimalist approach similar to Basie's, but the trio explores a wider terrain than the big band ever did".

== Track listing ==
1. "Sweet Georgia Brown" (Ben Bernie, Maceo Pinkard, Kenneth Casey) – 2:38
2. "My Blue Heaven" (Walter Donaldson, George A. Whiting) – 2:51
3. "Jive at Five" (Count Basie, Harry Edison) – 3:43
4. "Greensleeves" (Traditional) – 2:53
5. "When Your Lover Has Gone" (Einar Aaron Swan) – 3:15
6. "Philadelphia Bound" (Ray Bryant) – 3:18
7. "Close Your Eyes" (Bernice Petkere) – 3:21
8. "I Got Rhythm - Part I" (George Gershwin, Ira Gershwin) – 3:07
9. "I Got Rhythm - Part II" (Gershwin, Gershwin) – 2:59
10. "Embraceable You" (Gershwin, Gershwin) – 3:42
11. "Bebop Irishman" (Bryant) – 3:47
12. "Little Susie" (Bryant, Jo Jones, Tommy Bryant) – 3:55

== Personnel ==
- Jo Jones – drums
- Ray Bryant – piano
- Tommy Bryant – bass
