= Benny Morton =

American jazz musician (1907–1985)

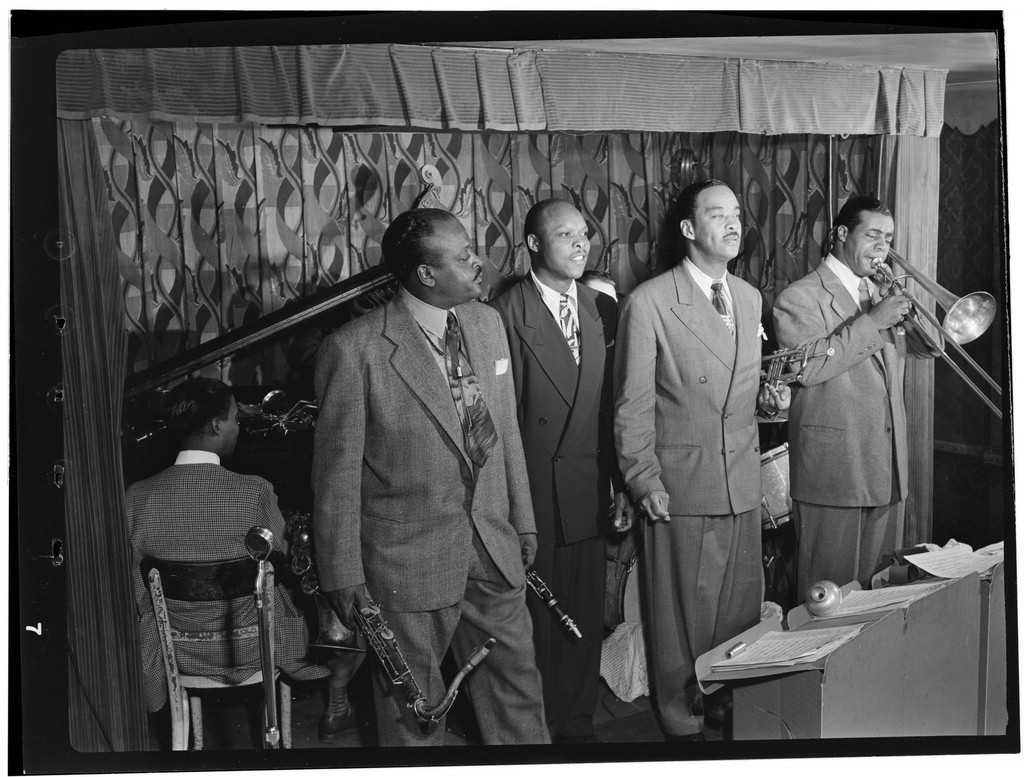

Benny Morton (January 31, 1907 – December 28, 1985) was an American jazz trombonist, most associated with the swing genre.

== Career ==
He was born in New York, United States.

One of his first jobs was working with Clarence Holiday, and he appeared with Clarence's daughter Billie Holiday towards the end of her life on The Sound of Jazz. Morton was a member of pianist Teddy Wilson's Sextet throughout the early 1940s. In the 1960s he was part of the Jazz Giants band: "Wild" Bill Davison (cornet), Herb Hall (clarinet and alto), Claude Hopkins (piano), Arvell Shaw (bass) and Buzzy Drootin (drums). They toured the U.S. and frequently in Canada where they did some recording for Sackville Records. Towards the end of the 1960s, he played with an offshoot of the Jazz Giants under the leadership of Buzzy Drootin, called Buzzy's Jazz Family, including Herb Hall, with Herman Autrey replacing Davison, Buzzy's nephew Sonny Drootin replacing Hopkins, and Eddie Gibbs replacing Shaw. He is probably best known for his work with Count Basie and Fletcher Henderson.

On February 23, 1934, Morton led a session of four songs that were issued under his own name (Benny Morton & His Orchestra). Made up mostly of member of Fletcher Henderson's and Don Redman's band, they included:

Henry Allen-trumpet/Benny Morton-trombone/Edward Inge-clarinet and alto saxophone/Jerry Blake-clarinet-alto saxophone)/Ted McRae-tenor saxophone/Don Kirkpatrick-piano/Bobby Johnson-guitar/Billy Taylor-slap bass/Manzie Johnson-drums.

- W 152717-2-3 "Get Goin'" (vocal and arrangement by Jerry Blake) (Columbia)
- W 152718-1 "Fare Thee Well To Harlem" (vocal by Jerry Blake) (Columbia)
- W 152719-1 "Tailor Made" (arranged by Billy Taylor) (Columbia)
- W 152720-2 "The Gold Digger's Song (We're In The Money)" (vocal by Henry Allen) (Columbia)

Benny Morton died in December 1985, at the age of 78.

== Discography ==
With Count Basie

- The Original American Decca Recordings (GRP, 1937-39 [1992])

With Ray Bryant

- Madison Time (Columbia, 1960)

With Buck Clayton and Ruby Braff

- Buck Meets Ruby (Vanguard, 1954)

With Rex Stewart

- Henderson Homecoming (United Artists, 1959)

With Dicky Wells

- Bones for the King (Felsted, 1958)
- Trombone Four-in-Hand (Felsted, 1959)
