= The Ray Bryant Touch =

Live album by Ray Bryant
- Released: 1967
- Recorded: May 19–20, 1967
- Venue: Memory Lane, Los Angeles, CA
- Genre: Jazz
- Label: Cadet; LP/LPS-793
- Producer: Esmond Edwards

Ray Bryant chronology
| Slow Freight (1967) | The Ray Bryant Touch (1967) | Take a Bryant Step (1967) |

The Ray Bryant Touch is a live album by pianist Ray Bryant recorded in Los Angeles and released by Sue Records in 1967.

Professional ratings
Review scores
| Source | Rating |
|---|---|
| AllMusic | 3/5 stars |

== Track listing ==
All compositions by Ray Bryant except where noted

1. "Little Susie" – 5:00
2. "This Is All I Ask" (Gordon Jenkins) – 5:38
3. "City Tribal Dance" – 2:27
4. "Prayer Song" – 4:02
5. "You Keep Me Hangin' On" (Brian Holland, Lamont Dozier, Eddie Holland) – 6:06
6. "Talkin' My Ease" – 5:20
7. "And I Love Her" (John Lennon, Paul McCartney) – 7:30

== Personnel ==
- Ray Bryant – piano
- Jimmy Rowser – bass
- Rudy Collins – drums
