= Alone at Montreux =

Live album by Ray Bryant
- Released: 1972
- Recorded: June 23, 1972
- Venue: Montreux Jazz Festival in Switzerland
- Genre: Jazz
- Length: 44:01
- Label: Atlantic; SD 1626
- Producer: Joel Dorn

Ray Bryant chronology
MCMLXX (1970)	Alone at Montreux (1972)	In the Cut (1974)

Alone at Montreux is a live solo album by American jazz pianist Ray Bryant recorded at the Montreux Jazz Festival in 1972 and released on the Atlantic label. In a 2016 interview with music journalist Bill King, Bryant stated "I do a lot of solo piano now. I really got into it in 1972 when I was called to play at Montreux Jazz Festival. It was my first time doing a live solo concert and it came off great.".

== Reception ==
Professional ratings
Review scores
Source	Rating
AllMusic	4/5 stars

AllMusic awarded the album 4 stars with its review by Scott Yanow stating "This solo outing finds Bryant playing swing standards, blues, soulful versions of a couple of current pop tunes and even a bit of boogie".

== Track listing ==
All compositions by Ray Bryant except as indicated

1. "Gotta Travel On" (Traditional) - 4:45
2. "Me and the blues = Blues #1/Willow Weep for Me" (Ray Bryant/Ann Ronell) - 6:40
3. "Cubano Chant" - 4:35
4. "Rockin' Chair" (Hoagy Carmichael) - 4:32
5. "After Hours" (Avery Parrish) - 3:28
6. "Slow Freight" - 5:08
7. "Greensleeves" (Traditional) - 2:00
8. "Little Susie" - 2:30
9. "Until It's Time for You to Go" (Buffy Sainte-Marie) - 3:23
10. "Blues #3" - 3:30
11. "Liebestraum Boogie" (Traditional) - 3:30

== Personnel ==
- Ray Bryant - piano
