= Take a Bryant Step =

Studio album by Ray Bryant
- Released: 1967
- Recorded: August 16 & November 20, 1967
- Studio: Ter Mar Studios, Chicago, IL
- Genre: Jazz
- Length: 39:11
- Label: Cadet; LP/LPS-801
- Producer: Richard Evans

Ray Bryant chronology
| The Ray Bryant Touch (1967) | Take a Bryant Step (1967) | Up Above the Rock (1968) |

Take a Bryant Step is an album by pianist Ray Bryant recorded and released by Cadet Records in 1967.

Professional ratings
Review scores
| Source | Rating |
|---|---|
| AllMusic | 3/5 stars |

== Track listing ==
1. "To Sir with Love" (Mark London. Don Black) – 3:05
2. "Ramblin'" (Ornette Coleman) – 3:10
3. "Natural Woman" (Gerry Goffin, Carole King, Jerry Wexler) – 2:35
4. "Ode to Billy Joe" (Bobbie Gentry) – 3:13
5. "Up-Up and Away" (Jimmy Webb) – 3:18
6. "Paint It Black" (Mick Jagger, Keith Richards) – 3:17
7. "Pata Pata" (Miriam Makeba, Jerry Ragovoy) – 3:07
8. "Poochie" (Richard Evans) – 3:07
9. "Yesterday" (John Lennon, Paul McCartney) – 2:40
10. "Paper Cup" (Webb) – 2:55
11. "Doing My Thing" (Evans) – 2:40
12. "Dinner On the Grounds" (Loonis McGlohon) – 3:28

== Personnel ==
- Ray Bryant – piano
- The Richard Evans Orchestra
- Ray Bryant (tracks 1–4, 6 & 8), Richard Evans (tracks 5, 7, 8 & 10–12) – arrangement
