= Blowin' in from K.C. =

Studio album by Joe Thomas and Jay McShann
- Released: 1983
- Recorded: December 9 & 10, 1982
- Studio: Nola Recording Studios, NYC
- Genre: Jazz
- Label: Uptown; UP 27.12
- Producer: Mark Feldman MD., Robert E. Sunenblick MD., Don Sickler

Joe Thomas chronology
Raw Meat (1982)	Blowin' in from K.C. (1983)

Jay McShann chronology
Tuxedo Junction (1982)	Blowin' in from K.C. (1983)	Just a Lucky So and So (1984)

Blowin' in from K.C. is an album by saxophonist Joe Thomas and pianist Jay McShann which was recorded in late 1982 and released by the Uptown label in 1983.

== Reception ==
Professional ratings
Review scores
Source	Rating
AllMusic	4/5 stars

The AllMusic review by Scott Yanow said "There are several exciting selections on this date ... This very rewarding Uptown LP (Joe Thomas' last recording) is a near-classic".

== Track listing ==
All compositions by Joe Thomas except where noted

1. "Raw Meat" – 6:05
2. "Tearing Hair" (Joe Thomas, George Duvivier) – 5:31
3. "What's Your Story Morning Glory" (Jack Lawrence, Paul Francis Webster) – 5:20
4. "Star Mist" (Thomas, Duvivier) – 2:47
5. "Jumpin' Joe" – 4:30
6. "Dog Food" – 5:45
7. "If I Could Be with You" (James P. Johnson, Henry Creamer) – 5:20
8. "Backstage at the Apollo" – 3:20

== Personnel ==
- Joe Thomas – tenor saxophone
- Jay McShann – piano
- Johnny Grimes – trumpet
- Dicky Harris – trombone
- Haywood Henry – baritone saxophone
- George Duvivier – bass
- Oliver Jackson (tracks 1, 2, 5 & 6), Jackie Williams (tracks 3, 4, 7 & 8) – drums
- Don Sickler – arranger
