= Sandy's Gone =

Studio album by Johnny Hodges
- Released: 1964
- Recorded: September 3 & 5, 1963; NYC
- Genre: Jazz
- Label: Verve V/V6 8561
- Producer: Creed Taylor

Johnny Hodges chronology
Johnny Hodges: Previously Unreleased Recordings (1963)	Sandy's Gone (1964)	Mess of Blues (1963)

Sandy's Gone is an album recorded by American jazz saxophonist Johnny Hodges featuring performances recorded in 1963 and released on the Verve label.

== Reception ==
Professional ratings
Review scores
Source	Rating
Allmusic	3/5 stars

The Allmusic site awarded the album 3 stars

== Track listing ==
Áll compositions by Claus Ogerman except as indicated

1. "Sandy's Gone" - 2:10
2. "Monkey Shack" - 2:16
3. "Wonderful! Wonderful!" (Sherman Edwards, Ben Raleigh) - 2:14
4. "Scarlett O'Hara" (Jerry Lordan) - 2:11
5. "Candy's Theme" (Oliver Nelson) - 2:13
6. "Follow Me" (Ogerman, Otto) - 1:53
7. "Blue Velvet" (Bernie Wayne, Lee Morris) - 2:18
8. "So Much in Love" (George Williams, Bill Jackson, Roy Straigis) - 2:22
9. "Again" (Lionel Newman, Dorcas Cochran) - 1:56
10. "Deep Purple (Peter DeRose, Mitchell Parish) - 2:20
11. "Since" - 2:20
12. ""The Caretakers" Theme" (Elmer Bernstein) - 2:03

== Personnel ==
- Johnny Hodges - alto saxophone
- Joe Newman, Joe Wilder - trumpet
- Hank Jones - piano
- Wild Bill Davis - organ
- Kenny Burrell - guitar
- Milt Hinton - bass
- Mel Lewis, Osie Johnson - drums
- Orchestra arranged and conducted by Claus Ogerman
