= Con Alma (Ray Bryant album) =

Studio album by Ray Bryant Trio
- Released: June 1961
- Recorded: November 25, 1960, and January 26, 1961
- Studio: Columbia Records, 30th Street Studio, New York City
- Genre: Jazz
- Length: 41:19
- Label: Columbia; CL-1633/CS-8433

Ray Bryant chronology
Madison Time (1960)	Con Alma (1961)	Dancing the Big Twist (1961)

Con Alma is an album by pianist Ray Bryant released on Columbia Records in 1961.

== Reception ==
Professional ratings
Review scores
Source	Rating
Allmusic	2.5/5 stars

The Allmusic review stated: "Bryant is typically soulful, swinging and reasonably explorative on nine songs".

== Track listing ==
1. "Con Alma" (Dizzy Gillespie) – 6:55
2. "Milestones" (Miles Davis) – 4:10
3. "'Round Midnight" (Thelonious Monk, Cootie Williams) – 3:51
4. "Django" (John Lewis) – 5:38 Bonus track on CD reissue
5. "Nuts and Bolts" (Ray Bryant) – 3:05
6. "Cubano Chant" (Bryant) – 4:22
7. "Ill Wind" (Harold Arlen, Ted Koehler) – 3:12
8. "Autumn Leaves" (Joseph Kosma, Jacques Prévert, Johnny Mercer) – 5:22
9. "C Jam Blues" (Duke Ellington) – 4:22
- Recorded at Columbia Records, 30th Street Studio, NYC, on November 25, 1960 (tracks 2 & 4), and January 26, 1961 (tracks 1, 3 & 5–9)

== Personnel ==
- Ray Bryant – piano
- Arthur Harper (tracks 2 & 4), Bill Lee (tracks 1, 3, 5 & 7–9) – bass
- Mickey Roker – drums (tracks 1–5 & 7–9)
