= Satin Doll (Red Garland album) =

Studio album by Red Garland
- Released: 1971
- Recorded: August 12 and October 2, 1959; Van Gelder Studio, Englewood Cliffs, New Jersey and The Prelude Club, New York City
- Genre: Jazz
- Length: 39:40
- Label: PrestigePR 7859

Red Garland chronology
Coleman Hawkins with the Red Garland Trio (1959)	Satin Doll (1971)	Red Garland at the Prelude (1959)

Satin Doll is an album by American pianist, composer and bandleader Red Garland which was recorded in 1959 but not released on the Prestige label until 1971.

== Reception ==
Professional ratings
Review scores
Source	Rating
Allmusic	2/5 stars

The Allmusic review by Scott Yanow stated: "This out-of-print LP released for the first time five unknown selections featuring pianist Red Garland in a trio... making this an album of interest to Red Garland completists".

== Track listing ==
All compositions by Red Garland except as indicated

1. "Satin Doll" (Duke Ellington, Johnny Mercer, Billy Strayhorn) - 9:45
2. "The Man I Love" (George Gershwin, Ira Gershwin) - 10:43
3. "A Little Bit of Basie" - 5:36
4. "It's a Blue World" (George Forrest, Robert Wright) - 7:08
5. "M-Squad Theme" (Count Basie) - 6:28
- Recorded at Van Gelder Studio in Englewood Cliffs New Jersey on August 12, 1959 (tracks 1–3) and The Prelude Club in New York City on October 2, 1959 (tracks 4 & 5)

== Personnel ==
- Red Garland - piano
- Jimmy Rowser - (tracks 4 & 5), Doug Watkins (tracks 1–3) - bass
- Charles "Specs" Wright - drums
