= Sonny Side Up =

1959 album by Dizzy Gillespie, Sonny Stitt and Sonny Rollins

Studio album by Dizzy Gillespie, Sonny Stitt and Sonny Rollins
- Released: January 1959
- Recorded: December 19, 1957
- Studio: Nola, NYC
- Genre: Jazz, bebop, hard bop
- Length: 37:42
- Label: Verve; MG V-8262
- Producer: Norman Granz

Dizzy Gillespie chronology
| Duets (1959) | Sonny Side Up (1959) | The Ebullient Mr. Gillespie (1959) |

Sonny Rollins chronology
| Freedom Suite (1958) | Sonny Side Up (1959) | Newk's Time (1959) |

Sonny Stitt chronology
| Sonny Stitt Sits in with the Oscar Peterson Trio (1959) | Sonny Side Up (1959) | The Hard Swing (1959) |

Professional ratings
Review scores
| Source | Rating |
|---|---|
| AllMusic | 4/5 stars |
| The Penguin Guide to Jazz Recordings | 3/4 stars |

Sonny Side Up is an album by trumpeter Dizzy Gillespie, and the tenor saxophonists Sonny Stitt and Sonny Rollins, recorded in December 1957 in New York City. It was released in 1959 on producer Norman Granz's newly launched Verve label. Pianist Ray Bryant, bassist Tommy Bryant, and drummer Charlie Persip form the rhythm section.

== Reception ==
As Thomas Cunniffe has written, "The pairing of Rollins and Stitt was highly inspired. More important than their common nicknames (and the punning album title), tenor saxophonists Rollins and Stitt were both influenced by Charlie Parker, but each took a vastly different approach to improvisation. Stitt transferred Parker's white-hot intensity to the tenor after several fans and critics pointed out the tonal similarity of their alto sounds. Rollins was a more thoughtful player who expanded the vocabulary of bop improvisation by incorporating thematic elements into his solos and by experimenting with different melodic shapes and unusual phrase lengths."

Stephen Cook of AllMusic described the album as "one of the most exciting 'jam session' records in the jazz catalog.... Both a highly enjoyable jazz set and something of an approximation of the music's once-revered live cutting session."

== Track listing ==
=== Side A ===
1. "On the Sunny Side of the Street" (Jimmy McHugh, Dorothy Fields) – 5:41
2. "The Eternal Triangle" (Stitt) – 14:10

=== Side B ===
1. "After Hours" (Avery Parrish) – 12:19
2. "I Know That You Know" (Vincent Youmans, Anne Caldwell) – 5:27

== Personnel ==
=== Musicians ===
- Dizzy Gillespie – trumpet, vocal (track 1)
- Sonny Stitt – tenor saxophone
- Sonny Rollins – tenor saxophone
- Ray Bryant – piano
- Tommy Bryant – bass
- Charlie Persip – drums

=== Technical personnel ===
- Norman Granz – producer
- Burt Goldblatt – cover photography
- Nat Hentoff – liner notes
