= Slow Freight =

Studio album by Ray Bryant
- Released: 1967
- Recorded: December 8, 1966
- Studio: RCA Studios, New York City, NY
- Genre: Jazz
- Length: 39:11
- Label: Cadet; LP/LPS-781
- Producer: Esmond Edwards

Ray Bryant chronology
Lonesome Traveler (1966)	Slow Freight (1967)	The Ray Bryant Touch (1967)

Slow Freight is an album by pianist Ray Bryant released by Cadet Records in 1967.

Professional ratings
Review scores
Source	Rating
AllMusic	3/5 stars

== Track listing ==
1. "Slow Freight" (Ray Bryant, Esmond Edwards) – 9:41
2. "Amen" (Donald Byrd) – 4:51
3. "Satin Doll" (Duke Ellington) – 6:50
4. "If You Go Away" (Jacques Brel, Rod McKuen) – 4:55
5. "Ah, the Apple Tree (When the World Was Young)" (Philippe-Gérard, Johnny Mercer) – 3:30
6. "The Return of the Prodigal Son" (Harold Ousley) – 5:03
7. "The Fox Stalker" (Bryant) – 3:32

== Personnel ==
- Ray Bryant – piano
- Art Farmer, Snooky Young – trumpet, flugelhorn
- Richard Davis – bass
- Freddie Waits – drums
