= Lil' Darlin' =

Live album by Red Garland
- Released: 1959
- Recorded: October 2, 1959; The Prelude Club, New York City
- Genre: Jazz
- Length: 30:35
- Label: Status ST 8314

Red Garland chronology
Red Garland at the Prelude (1959)	Lil' Darlin' (1959)	Red Garland Live! (1959)

Lil' Darlin' is a live album by American pianist, composer and bandleader Red Garland which was recorded in 1959 and originally released on the Status label, a subsidiary of Prestige Records. The album was recorded at the Prelude Club in New York City at the same concert that produced Red Garland at the Prelude and Red Garland Live!. The full three-set concert was issued as a two CD compilation in 2003 under the Red Garland at the Prelude name.

== Reception ==
Professional ratings
Review scores
Source	Rating
Allmusic	4/5 stars

The Allmusic review by Alex Henderson stated, "Like the other LPs that resulted from Garland's Prelude appearance, Lil' Darlin' demonstrates that the pianist was in excellent form on that night in October 1959". C. Michael Bailey from All About Jazz in his review of the 2006 release of the complete Prelude recordings stated "There may be an argument that The Red Garland Trio at the Prelude is the last of the great Garland Trio recordings. The pianist performed and recorded sporadically until his death at 61 years old in 1984. But it is these Prelude sides illustrate Red Garland at top form in his craft".

== Track listing ==
1. "Li'l Darlin'" (Neal Hefti) - 10:07
2. "We Kiss in a Shadow" (Oscar Hammerstein II, Richard Rodgers) - 5:46
3. "Blues in the Closet" (Oscar Pettiford) - 4:28
4. "Like Someone in Love" (Johnny Burke, Jimmy Van Heusen) - 10:14
- Recorded The Prelude Club in New York City on October 2, 1959

== Personnel ==
- Red Garland - piano
- Jimmy Rowser - bass
- Charles "Specs" Wright - drums
