= Hollywood Jazz Beat =

Studio album by Ray Bryant
- Released: June 1962
- Recorded: March 27 & 30 and April 10, 1962
- Studio: Hollywood, CA
- Genre: Jazz
- Label: Columbia; CL-1867/CS-8667
- Producer: John Hammond

Ray Bryant chronology
Dancing the Big Twist (1961)	Hollywood Jazz Beat (1962)	Groove House (1963)

Hollywood Jazz Beat is an album by pianist Ray Bryant, performing orchestral versions of motion picture themes. It was released by Columbia Records in 1962.

Professional ratings
Review scores
Source	Rating
Allmusic	3/5 stars

== Track listing ==
1. "On Green Dolphin Street" (Bronisław Kaper, Ned Washington) – 2:16
2. "Ruby" (Heinz Roemheld, Mitchell Parish) – 3:08
3. "Invitation" (Kaper, Paul Francis Webster) – 2:58
4. "Secret Love" (Sammy Fain, Webster) – 2:16
5. "An Affair to Remember (Our Love Affair)" (Harry Warren, Harold Adamson, Leo McCarey) – 2:30
6. "The High and the Mighty" (Dimitri Tiomkin, Washington) – 2:09
7. "Exodus (Main Theme)" (Ernest Gold) – 2:00
8. "Laura" (David Raksin, Johnny Mercer) – 4:32
9. "Three Coins in the Fountain" (Jule Styne, Sammy Cahn) – 3:20
10. "El Cid (Love Theme)" (Miklós Rózsa) – 2:21
11. "Tonight" (Leonard Bernstein, Stephen Sondheim) – 1:51
12. "True Love" (Cole Porter) – 2:08
- Recorded in Hollywood, CA on March 27, 1962 (tracks 1, 3, 7 & 12), March 30, 1962 (tracks 5 & 8) and April 10, 1962 (tracks 2, 4, 6 & 9–11)

== Personnel ==
- Ray Bryant – piano
- Unidentified orchestra arranged and conducted by Richard Wess
