= Coleman Hawkins with the Red Garland Trio =

Studio album by Coleman Hawkins with the Red Garland Trio
- Released: 1959
- Recorded: August 12, 1959
- Studio: Van Gelder, Englewood Cliffs, New Jersey
- Genre: Jazz
- Label: Swingville; SVLP 2001

Coleman Hawkins chronology
Hawk Eyes (1959)	Coleman Hawkins with the Red Garland Trio (1959)	Coleman Hawkins All Stars (1960)

Red Garland chronology
Red in Bluesville (1959)	Coleman Hawkins with the Red Garland Trio (1959)	Satin Doll (1959)

Coleman Hawkins with the Red Garland Trio (also referred to as Swingville 2001) is an album by saxophonist Coleman Hawkins with pianist Red Garland's trio recorded August 12, 1959 and released on the Swingville label.

== Reception ==
Professional ratings
Review scores
Source	Rating
Allmusic	3/5 stars
The Penguin Guide to Jazz Recordings	3.5/4 stars

The Allmusic review by Scott Yanow stated: "One of Hawkins's better Prestige sessions (originally on its Swingville subsidiary) finds him fronting a then-modern rhythm section for a variety of basic originals."

== Track listing ==
1. "It's a Blue World" (George Forrest, Robert Wright) – 7:59
2. "I Wanna Be Loved" (Johnny Green) – 5:54
3. "Red Beans" (Coleman Hawkins, Red Garland) – 4:14
4. "Bean's Blues" (Red Garland) – 11:54
5. "Blues for Ron" (Doug Watkins) – 6:14

== Personnel ==
- Coleman Hawkins – tenor saxophone
- Red Garland – piano
- Doug Watkins – bass
- Charles "Specs" Wright – drums
