= Soul (Ray Bryant album) =

Studio album by Ray Bryant
- Released: 1965
- Recorded: 1964
- Studio: New York City
- Genre: Jazz
- Length: 41:59
- Label: Sue; LP/STLP-1036
- Producer: Juggy Murray

Ray Bryant chronology
Cold Turkey (1964)	Soul (1965)	Gotta Travel On (1966)

Soul is an album by pianist Ray Bryant released on Sue Records in 1965.

== Reception ==
Professional ratings
Review scores
Source	Rating
Allmusic	3/5 stars
The Penguin Guide to Jazz Recordings	2.5/4 stars

The Allmusic review stated: "Ray Bryant is a master of soul-jazz but these 1964 studio recordings are a bit of a disappointment. ... Bryant leans a bit too heavily toward rhythm & blues, while his music might have been more interesting heard as piano solos. A piano of questionable tuning and muddy sound hardly helps matters. ... Most fans of Ray Bryant can safely bypass this release".

== Track listing ==
All compositions by Ray Bryant except where noted

1. "I Miss You So" (Bertha Scott, Jimmie Henderson, Sid Robin) – 3:24
2. "I Almost Lost My Mind]]" (Ivory Joe Hunter) – 4:17
3. "Since I Fell For You" (Buddy Johnson) – 2:55
4. "They All Say I'm The Biggest Fool" (Johnson) – 2:37
5. "Gospel Bird" – 4:25
6. "Little Suzie '65" – 2:29
7. "Lonely Avenue" (Doc Pomus, Ray Charles) – 3:30
8. "Please Send Me Someone to Love" (Percy Mayfield) – 3:40
9. "Stick With It" – 4:03
10. "I Don't Care Who Knows" (Johnson) – 3:49
11. "Goldfinger" (John Barry, Leslie Bricusse, Anthony Newley) – 2:40
12. "Adalia" – 2:48

== Personnel ==
- Ray Bryant – piano
- Wally Richardson – guitar (tracks 3, 5, 7 & 9)
- Tommy Bryant – bass
- Sonny Brown (tracks 6, 11 & 12), Walter Perkins (tracks 1–5 & 7–10) – drums
