= Little Susie =

1960 album by Ray Bryant

Studio album by Ray Bryant Trio
- Released: October 1960
- Recorded: December 10, 1959 and January 19, 1960
- Studio: Columbia 30th Street Studio, New York City
- Genre: Jazz
- Label: Columbia; CL-1449/CS-8244

Ray Bryant chronology
Ray Bryant Plays (1959)	Little Susie (1960)	Madison Time (1960)

Little Susie is an album by pianist Ray Bryant released on Columbia Records in 1960.

== Reception ==
Professional ratings
Review scores
Source	Rating
AllMusic	3/5 stars
Encyclopedia of Popular Music	5/5 stars

The AllMusic review stated "Pianist Ray Bryant's debut for Columbia was named after 'Little Susie,' a hit single he had a short time earlier recorded for Signature. The trio LP with bassist Tommy Bryant and either Gus Johnson or Eddie Locke on drums has a remake of 'Little Susie,' a few other originals that did not catch on as hits".

== Track listing ==
All compositions by Ray Bryant except where noted

1. "Little Susie" – 4:40
2. "By Myself" (Howard Dietz, Arthur Schwartz) – 3:20
3. "Blues For Norine" – 4:35
4. "Moon-Faced, Starry-Eyed" (Kurt Weill, Langston Hughes) – 3:27
5. "Big Buddy" – 5:37
6. "Willow Weep for Me" (Ann Ronell) – 5:12
7. "Greensleeves" (Traditional) – 2:26
8. "So In Love" (Cole Porter) – 5:41
9. "If I Can Just Make It" (Traditional) – 2:12
10. "Misty" (Erroll Garner) – 4:04
- Recorded at Columbia Records, 30th Street Studio, NYC., on December 10, 1959 (tracks 1–3 & 10) and January 19, 1960 (tracks 4–9)

== Personnel ==
- Ray Bryant – piano
- Tommy Bryant – bass
- Oliver Jackson (tracks 1–3 & 10), Eddie Locke (tracks 4–9) – drums
