= Mess of Blues (Johnny Hodges and Wild Bill Davis album) =

Studio album by Johnny Hodges and Wild Bill Davis
- Released: 1964
- Recorded: September 3 & 4, 1963; NYC
- Genre: Jazz
- Label: Verve V/V6 8570
- Producer: Creed Taylor

Johnny Hodges chronology
Sandy's Gone (1963)	Mess of Blues (1964)	Everybody Knows Johnny Hodges (1964)

Wild Bill Davis chronology
Wild Wild Wild Wild Wild Wild Wild Wild Wild Wild Bill Davis (1963)	Mess of Blues (1963)	Blue Rabbit (1964)

Mess of Blues is an album recorded by American jazz saxophonist Johnny Hodges and organist Wild Bill Davis featuring performances recorded in 1963 and released on the Verve label.

== Reception ==
Professional ratings
Review scores
Source	Rating
Allmusic	3/5 stars

The Allmusic site awarded the album 3 stars stating "Hodges plays typically beautifully on such numbers as "I Cried for You," "Lost in Meditation" and "Stolen Sweets" and, although no real surprises occur (and the playing time at around a half-hour is quite brief), the performances are up to par". Of the seven studio albums recorded by Hodges and Wild Bill Davis from 1961 to 1966, Mess of Blues is the only album that does not utilize a bass player (though the live session Wild Bill Davis & Johnny Hodges in Atlantic City similarly forgoes a bass player).

== Track listing ==
1. "Jones" (Duke Ellington, Pauline Reddon) - 4:43
2. "I Cried for You" (Arthur Freed, Abe Lyman, Gus Arnheim) - 3:02
3. "Love You Madly" (Duke Ellington) - 3:51
4. "Little John, Little John" (Johnny Hodges) - 4:03
5. "Stolen Sweets" (Wild Bill Davis) - 3:14
6. "A&R Blues" (Hodges) - 6:07
7. "Lost in Meditation" (Ellington, Irving Mills, Juan Tizol, Lou Singer) - 3:17

== Personnel ==
- Johnny Hodges - alto saxophone
- Wild Bill Davis - organ
- Kenny Burrell - guitar
- Ed Shaughnessy - drums
