= All Blues (Ray Bryant album) =

Studio album by Ray Bryant
- Released: 1978
- Recorded: April 10, 1978
- Studios: RCA Studios, New York, NY
- Genre: Jazz
- Length: 47:18
- Labels: Pablo; 2310-820
- Producer: Norman Granz

Ray Bryant chronology
Montreux '77 (1977)	All Blues (1978)	Potpourri (1981)

All Blues is an album by pianist Ray Bryant recorded in 1978 and released by the Pablo label.

== Reception ==
Professional ratings
Review scores
Source	Rating
AllMusic	3/5 stars
DownBeat	4.5/5 stars

AllMusic reviewer Scott Yanow awarded the album 3 stars and said that "Bryant explores an impressive variety of blues styles and grooves, leaving listeners with a happy feeling." A 1979 review in Walrus magazine called the album "comfortable".

== Track listing ==
All compositions by Ray Bryant except where noted

1. "Stick With It" – 7:45
2. "All Blues" (Miles Davis) – 8:27
3. "C Jam Blues" (Duke Ellington) – 5:10
4. "Please Send Me Someone to Love" (Percy Mayfield) – 5:56
5. "Jumpin' With Symphony Sid" (Lester Young) – 6:25
6. "Blues Changes" – 6:05
7. "Billie's Bounce" (Charlie Parker) – 7:31

== Personnel ==
- Ray Bryant – piano
- Sam Jones – bass
- Grady Tate – drums
