= Con Alma =

Jazz standard written by Dizzy Gillespie

"Con Alma" is a jazz standard written by Dizzy Gillespie, appearing on his 1954 album Afro. The tune incorporates aspects of bebop jazz and Latin rhythm, and is known for its frequent changes in key centers (occurring every two bars), while still maintaining a singable melody.

== Notable recordings ==
It has been noted that "As good as Dizzy's versions of his own tune are, it's probably not too crazy to say that 'Con Alma' really took off in the hands of other musicians." Among those who have recorded versions are:

- Sonny Stitt (Duets Verve, 1957)
- Hal McKusick (Triple Exposure, 1957)
- Oscar Peterson (The Jazz Soul of Oscar Peterson, 1959; Swinging Brass with the Oscar Peterson Trio, 1959)
- Roy Haynes (Just Us, 1960)
- The Jazztet (Big City Sounds, 1960)
- Ray Bryant (Con Alma, 1961)
- Wes Montgomery (Bumpin', 1965)
- Charles McPherson (Con Alma!, 1965)
- Brian Bennett (Change of Direction, 1967)
- Stan Getz (Sweet Rain, 1967)
- Kenny Burrell (Ode to 52nd Street, 1967)
- Brother Jack McDuff (The Natural Thing, 1968)
- Randy Weston (African Nite, 1975)
- Ed Bickert (Out of the Past , 1976-first released in 2006 on Sackville)
- Lalo Schiffrin (Ins and Outs, 1985)
- Jesse van Ruller (Trio Tribute, 2001)
- George Shearing (Like Fine Wine, 2004)
- Cedar Walton (Underground Memoirs, 2005)
- Gerald Clayton (Two-Shade, 2009)
- Paquito D'Rivera (Panamericana Suite, 2010)
- Poncho Sanchez and Terence Blanchard (Chano y Dizzy!, 2011)
- Ulysses Owens, Jr. and Christian Sands (Unanimous, 2012)
- Carlos Miguel Hernandez (as part of the album Dizzy el Afrocubano by Abraham Mansfarroll, 2021)
- Roy Hargrove and Mulgrew Miller ( In Harmony ,2006: recording released in 2021)
- Chaka Khan as part of the "Be Bop Medley" (Chaka Khan, 1982)
