= Groove House =

Studio album by Ray Bryant
- Released: 1963
- Recorded: May 22 and June 14 & 19, 1963
- Studio: New York City
- Genre: Jazz
- Length: 31:33
- Label: Sue; LP-1016/STLP-1016
- Producer: Juggy Murray

Ray Bryant chronology
Hollywood Jazz Beat (1962)	Groove House (1963)	Live at Basin Street East (1963)

Groove House is an album by pianist Ray Bryant released on Sue Records in 1963.

== Reception ==
Professional ratings
Review scores
Source	Rating
AllMusic	3/5 stars
The Penguin Guide to Jazz Recordings	2.5/4 stars

The AllMusic review stated "Pianist Ray Bryant covers a lot of ground in the 30-odd minutes of this release from 1963. For much of the time, the versatile pianist – accompanied by a classic, supportive rhythm section – plays like a less intense version of piano giants such as Art Tatum, Bud Powell, and Oscar Peterson".

== Track listing ==
All compositions by Ray Bryant except where noted

1. "Joey" (Herbert Wiener, Stanley Bernstein, James J. Kriegsmann, Bert Salmirs) – 3:30
2. "The Sweetest Sounds" (Richard Rodgers) – 4:04
3. "Glissamba" – 4:00
4. "My Reverie" (Larry Clinton) – 2:30
5. "Sometimes I Feel Like A Motherless Child = Long Way from Home" (Traditional) – 3:00
6. "In the Backroom" – 4:40
7. "Swing Low, Sweet Chariot = Chariot Swing" (Traditional) – 3:00
8. "No. Two" – 3:06
9. "Gravy Waltz" (Ray Brown) – 3:10
10. "Be-Bop Irishman" – 3:42
- Recorded in New York City on May 22, 1963 (tracks 3, 7–9), June 14, 1963 (tracks 2, 4 & 6) and June 19, 1963 (tracks 1, 5 & 10)

== Personnel ==
- Ray Bryant – piano
- Wally Richardson – guitar (tracks 3, 7–9)
- Tommy Bryant – bass
- Bobby Donaldson (tracks 1, 2, 4–6 & 10), Panama Francis (tracks 3, 7–9) – drums
