= The Ebullient Mr. Gillespie =

Studio album by Dizzy Gillespie
- Released: 1959
- Recorded: February 17, 18 & 20, 1959
- Studio: NYC
- Genre: Jazz
- Length: 44:54
- Label: Verve; MG V 8328
- Producer: Norman Granz

Dizzy Gillespie chronology
Sonny Side Up (1959)	The Ebullient Mr. Gillespie (1959)	Have Trumpet, Will Excite! (1959)

The Ebullient Mr. Gillespie is an album by trumpeter Dizzy Gillespie, recorded in 1959 and released on the Verve label.

== Reception ==
The AllMusic review calls the album "a pleasing – if not all that essential – date of melodic music from the masterful trumpeter."

Professional ratings
Review scores
Source	Rating
AllMusic	2.5/5 stars
DownBeat	3.5/5 stars
The Encyclopedia of Popular Music	3/5 stars

== Track listing ==
All compositions by Dizzy Gillespie except as indicated

=== Side A ===
1. "Swing Low, Sweet Cadillac" – 7:06
2. "Always" (Irving Berlin) – 5:34
3. "Willow Weep for Me" (Ann Ronell) – 7:20
4. "Ungawa" (Gillespie, Oswaldo Nuñez) – 3:19

=== Side B ===
1. "Lorraine" – 4:14
2. "Girl of My Dreams" (Sunny Clapp) – 7:41
3. "Constantinople" – 7:00
4. "Umbrella Man" (Vincent Rose, Larry Stock, James Cavanaugh) – 2:40
- The Fresh Sound 2-CD set also includes the complete Have Trumpet Will Excite Album

== Personnel ==
- Dizzy Gillespie – trumpet, vocals (tracks 1 and 8)
- Les Spann – guitar, flute
- Junior Mance – piano
- Sam Jones – bass
- Lex Humphries – drums
- Carlos "Patato" Valdes – congas (tracks 4 and 5)
