= Red Garland at the Prelude =

Live album by Red Garland
- Released: 1971
- Recorded: October 2, 1959; The Prelude Club, New York City
- Genre: Jazz
- Length: 43:28
- Label: PrestigePRLP 7170

Red Garland chronology
Satin Doll (1959)	Red Garland at the Prelude (1971)	Lil' Darlin' (1959)

Red Garland at the Prelude is a live album by American pianist, composer and bandleader Red Garland which was recorded in 1959 and released on the Prestige label. The album was recorded at the Prelude Club at the same concert that produced Lil' Darlin' and Red Garland Live!.

A significantly expanded version of this album was reissued in 2006 as a 2-CD set, incorporating tracks from the albums Lil' Darlin', Red Garland Live! and Satin Doll as well as four previously unissued tracks.

== Reception ==
Professional ratings
Review scores
Source	Rating
Allmusic	5/5 stars
DownBeat	5/5 stars

The Allmusic review by Scott Yanow stated: "Straight-ahead jazz fans should get this one". C. Michael Bailey from All About Jazz stated: "There may be an argument that The Red Garland Trio at the Prelude is the last of the great Garland Trio recordings. The pianist performed and recorded sporadically until his death at 61 years old in 1984. But it is these Prelude sides illustrate Red Garland at top form in his craft".

== Track listing ==
1. "Satin Doll" (Duke Ellington, Johnny Mercer, Billy Strayhorn) - 6:21
2. "Perdido" (Ervin Drake, Juan Tizol) - 4:36
3. "There Will Never Be Another You" (Mack Gordon, Harry Warren) - 6:43
4. "Bye Bye Blackbird" (Mort Dixon, Ray Henderson) - 5:05
5. "Let Me See" (Count Basie, Harry "Sweets" Edison, Jon Hendricks) - 5:57
6. "Prelude Blues" (Red Garland) - 5:41
7. "Just Squeeze Me (But Don't Tease Me)" (Ellington, Lee Gaines) - 5:41
8. "One O'Clock Jump" (Count Basie) - 3:24
- Recorded The Prelude Club in New York City on October 2, 1959

== Track Listing for the expanded version of this album issued in 2006 ==
Disc 1

- Set 1
1. "M-Squad Theme" (Count Basie) - 6:28
2. "There Will Never Be Another You" (Mack Gordon, Harry Warren) - 6:43
3. "Let Me See" (Count Basie, Harry "Sweets" Edison, Jon Hendricks) - 5:57
4. "We Kiss in a Shadow" (Oscar Hammerstein II, Richard Rodgers) - 5:46
5. "Blues in the Closet" (Oscar Pettiford) - 4:28
6. "Satin Doll" (Duke Ellington, Johnny Mercer, Billy Strayhorn) - 9:22 (previously unissued)
7. "Li'l Darlin'" (Neal Hefti) - :29 (false start/previously unissued)
8. "Li'l Darlin'" (Neal Hefti) - 10:07
9. "One O'Clock Jump" (Count Basie) - 3:24
- Set 2
1. "Perdido" (Ervin Drake, Juan Tizol) - 4:36
2. "Bye Bye Blackbird" (Mort Dixon, Ray Henderson) - 5:05
3. "Like Someone in Love" (Johnny Burke, Jimmy Van Heusen) - 10:14

Disc 2

- (Set 2 continued)
1. "It's a Blue World" (George Forrest, Robert Wright) - 7:08
2. "Marie" (Irving Berlin) - 6:17
3. "Bohemian Blues" - 9:58
4. "One O'Clock Jump" (Count Basie) - 2:42
- Set 3
1. "A Foggy Day" (George Gershwin, Ira Gershwin) - 5:36
2. "Satin Doll" (Duke Ellington, Johnny Mercer, Billy Strayhorn) - 6:21
3. "Mr. Wonderful" (Jerry Bock, George David Weiss) - 9:06
4. "Just Squeeze Me (But Please Don't Tease Me)" (Duke Ellington, Lee Gaines) - 5:41
5. "Prelude Blues" (Red Garland) - 5:41
6. "Cherokee" (Red Garland) - 5:20
7. "One O'Clock Jump" (Count Basie) - 2:01
- Recorded The Prelude Club in New York City on October 2, 1959

== Personnel ==
- Red Garland - piano
- Jimmy Rowser - bass
- Charles "Specs" Wright - drums
