= Everybody Knows Johnny Hodges =

1964 album by Johnny Hodges

Studio album by Johnny Hodges
- Released: 1964
- Recorded: February 6, 1964
- Genre: Jazz
- Length: 68:04
- Label: Impulse! Records
- Producer: Bob Thiele

Johnny Hodges chronology
Mess of Blues (1963)	Everybody Knows Johnny Hodges (1964)	Blue Rabbit (1964)

Everybody Knows Johnny Hodges is an album by jazz saxophonist Johnny Hodges, released on Impulse! Records in 1964.

== Reception ==
Professional ratings
Review scores
Source	Rating
AllMusic	4.5/5 stars
The Penguin Guide to Jazz Recordings	4/4 stars
The Rolling Stone Jazz Record Guide	4/5 stars

In a review for AllMusic, Michael G. Nastos wrote: "It would be difficult to pick a favorite or a clunker, and you'd be hard-pressed to find anything more inspired or another project loaded with this much talent. Everybody knows Johnny Hodges and this stellar collection of all-stars, because they are absolutely the best at what they do."

The authors of The Penguin Guide to Jazz Recordings awarded the album a full 4 stars, calling it "essential."

== Track listing ==
1. "Everybody Knows" (Johnny Hodges) – 7:25
2. "A Flower is a Lovesome Thing" (Billy Strayhorn) – 3:04
3. "Papa Knows" (J. Hodges) – 6:52
4. "310 Blues" (Strayhorn) – 4:34
5. "The Jeep is Jumpin'" (Duke Ellington, Hodges, Strayhorn) – 2:45
6. "Main Stem" (Ellington) – 3:28
7. "Medley: I Let a Song Go Out of My Heart/Don't Get Around Much Anymore" (Ellington, Irving Mills, Henry Nemo, John Redmond, Bob Russell – 4:44
8. "Open Mike" (Cat Anderson) – 3:09

The CD version adds 8 bonus tracks, consisting of the entire album Inspired/Abandon by Lawrence Brown's All-Stars feat. Johnny Hodges:

1. "Stompy Jones" (Ellington) – 4:00
2. "Mood Indigo" (Barney Bigard, Ellington, Mills) – 4:25
3. "Good Queen Bess" (J. Hodges) – 3:07
4. "Little Brother" (J. Hodges, Cue Hodges) – 5:43
5. "Jeep's Blues" (Ellington, J. Hodges) – 5:43
6. "Do Nothin' Till You Hear from Me" (Ellington, Russell) – 2:34
7. "Ruint" (Ellington, J. Hodges) – 3:21
8. "Sassy Cue" (J. Hodges, C. Hodges) – 3:42

== Personnel ==
=== Performance ===
- Johnny Hodges – alto sax
- Cat Anderson – trumpet
- Harold Ashby – tenor sax
- Lawrence Brown – trombone
- Harry Carney – baritone sax
- Buster Cooper – trombone
- Richard Davis – bass
- Rolf Ericson – trumpet
- Paul Gonsalves – tenor sax
- Jimmy Hamilton – clarinet, tenor sax

- Johnny Hodges, Jr. – drums
- Gus Johnson – drums
- Herb Jones – trumpet
- Osvaldo Berlingieri – piano
- Ray Nance – trumpet, violin, vocals
- Russell Procope – clarinet, alto sax
- Ernie Shepard – bass
- Grady Tate – drums
- Britt Woodman – trombone

=== Production ===
- Cue Hodges – composer
- Billy Strayhorn – composer
- Bob Thiele – original session producer
- Doreen Kalcich – assistant producer
- Bob Simpson – engineer
- Rudy Van Gelder – engineer
- Joseph Doughney – post-production
- Michael Landy – post-production
- Adam Zelinka – post-production
- Michael Pollard – production coordination
- Michael Cuscuna – reissue producer
- Erick Labson – digital remastering

- Dave Grusin – executive producer
- Larry Rosen – executive producer
- Stanley Dance – liner notes
- Frank Driggs – photography
- Charles Stewart – photography
- Emili Bogin – graphic design
- David Gibb – graphic design
- Scott Johnson – graphic design
- Andy Ruggirello – graphic design
- Dan Serrano – graphic design
- Andy Baltimore – creative director
