= Here's Ray Bryant =

Studio album by Ray Bryant
- Released: 1976
- Recorded: January 10 & 12, 1976
- Studio: RCA Recording Studios, New York, NY
- Genre: Jazz
- Length: 47:49
- Label: Pablo; 2310 764
- Producer: Norman Granz

Ray Bryant chronology
| Hot Turkey (1975) | Here's Ray Bryant (1976) | Solo Flight (1977) |

Here's Ray Bryant is an album by pianist Ray Bryant recorded in 1976 and released by the Pablo label.

== Reception ==
Professional ratings
Review scores
| Source | Rating |
|---|---|
| AllMusic | 3/5 stars |
| The Penguin Guide to Jazz Recordings | 3.5/4 stars |

AllMusic reviewer Scott Yanow called it "a set of soulful and bluesy interpretations of five standards and three originals ... A relaxed outing, not essential but enjoyable".

== Track listing ==
All compositions by Ray Bryant except where noted

1. "Girl Talk" (Neal Hefti, Bobby Troup) – 7:20
2. "Good Morning Heartache" (Irene Higginbotham, Ervin Drake, Dan Fisher) – 4:42
3. "Manteca" (Dizzy Gillespie, Chano Pozo, Gil Fuller) – 6:53
4. "When Sunny Gets Blue" (Marvin Fisher, Jack Segal) – 5:23
5. "Hold Back Mon" – 5:58
6. "Li'l Darlin'" (Hefti) – 7:57
7. "Cold Turkey" – 5:08
8. "Prayer Song" – 4:28

== Personnel ==
- Ray Bryant – piano
- George Duvivier – bass
- Grady Tate – drums
