= Blue Rabbit =

Studio album by Johnny Hodges and Wild Bill Davis
- Released: 1964
- Recorded: May 15 & 16, 1963 and April 28 & 30, 1964; NYC
- Genre: Jazz
- Label: Verve V/V6 8599
- Producer: Creed Taylor

Johnny Hodges chronology
Everybody Knows Johnny Hodges (1964)	Blue Rabbit (1964)	Con-Soul & Sax (1965)

Wild Bill Davis chronology
Mess of Blues (1963)	Blue Rabbit (1964)	Free Frantic and Funky (1965)

Blue Rabbit is an album by American jazz saxophonist Johnny Hodges and organist Wild Bill Davis featuring performances recorded in 1963 and 1964 and released on the Verve label.

== Reception ==
Professional ratings
Review scores
Source	Rating
Allmusic	3/5 stars

The Allmusic site awarded the album 3 stars stating "The music is fairly typical for a Hodges date, with four Ellington standards, some blues and some basic originals. In a few spots, the organists really do a good job of filling in for the Ellington Orchestra. Tasty and swinging music".

== Track listing ==
1. "Blues O' Mighty" (Johnny Hodges, Edith Hodges) - 4:54
2. "Fiddler's Fancy" (Wild Bill Davis) - 2:50
3. "Tangerine" (Victor Schertzinger, Johnny Mercer) - 3:17
4. "Creole Love Call" (Duke Ellington) - 5:45
5. "Things Ain't What They Used To Be" (Mercer Ellington, Ted Parsons) - 4:15
6. "Wisteria" (Mercer Ellington, Jimmy Jones) - 3:10
7. "Satin Doll" (Billy Strayhorn, Duke Ellington) - 2:28
8. "I Let a Song Go Out of My Heart" (Duke Ellington, Irving Mills, Henry Nemo, John Redmond) - 2:37
9. "Mud Pie" (Jimmy Hamilton) - 4:10
- Recorded in New York on May 15, 1963 (tracks 3 & 8), May 16, 1963 (track 4), April 28, 1964 (tracks 1, 2, 5 & 7), and April 30, 1964 (tracks 6 & 9)

== Personnel ==
- Johnny Hodges - alto saxophone
- Wild Bill Davis (tracks 1, 2, 5-7 & 9), Ray Jackson (tracks 3, 4 & 8) - organ
- Kenny Burrell (tracks 3, 4 & 8), Mundell Lowe (tracks 1, 2, 5-7 & 9) - guitar
- Richard Davis (tracks 1, 2, 5-7 & 9), Jack Lesberg (track 4), Wendell Marshall (tracks 3 & 8) - double bass
- Bobby Donaldson (tracks 3, 4 & 8), Osie Johnson (tracks 1, 2, 5-7 & 9) - drums
