= The Greatest Trumpet of Them All =

Studio album by Dizzy Gillespie
- Released: 1959
- Recorded: December 17, 1957
- Studio: NYC
- Genre: Jazz
- Length: 41:10
- Label: Verve; MGV 8352
- Producer: Norman Granz

Dizzy Gillespie chronology
Have Trumpet, Will Excite! (1959)	The Greatest Trumpet of Them All (1959)	A Portrait of Duke Ellington (1960)

The Greatest Trumpet of Them All is a 1959 album by trumpeter Dizzy Gillespie featuring Benny Golson, recorded in 1957 and released on the Verve label.

== Reception ==
The AllMusic review states: "For many other jazz musicians this would be a 'good' or even 'fine' effort, but Dizzy Gillespie has recorded too much classic music for this disappointment to rate very high."

Professional ratings
Review scores
Source	Rating
AllMusic	2/5 stars
The Rolling Stone Jazz Record Guide	4/5 stars

== Track listing ==
All songs composed by Gigi Gryce, except as noted.

=== Side A ===
1. "Blues After Dark" (Benny Golson) – 6:29
2. "Sea Breeze" (Larry Douglas, Fred Norman and Rommie Beardon) – 3:17
3. "Out of the Past" (Benny Golson) – 5:32
4. "Shabozz" – 6:00

=== Side B ===
1. "Reminiscing" – 4:50
2. "A Night at Tony's" – 5:11
3. "Smoke Signals" – 5:04
4. "Just by Myself" (Benny Golson) – 4:47

== Personnel ==
- Dizzy Gillespie – trumpet
- Henry Coker – trombone
- Gigi Gryce – alto saxophone, arranger
- Benny Golson – tenor saxophone, arranger
- Pee Wee Moore – baritone saxophone
- Ray Bryant – piano
- Tommy Bryant – bass
- Charlie Persip – drums
