= Jo Jones Plus Two =

Studio album by Jo Jones
- Released: 1959
- Recorded: April 30, 1958
- Studio: Europe
- Genre: Jazz
- Length: 42:02
- Label: Vanguard; VRS-8525
- Producer: John Hammond

Jo Jones chronology
The Coleman Hawkins, Roy Eldridge, Pete Brown, Jo Jones All Stars at Newport (1957)	Jo Jones Plus Two (1959)	Jo Jones Trio (1959)

Jo Jones Plus Two is an album recorded by drummer Jo Jones in 1958 and released by the Vanguard label.

== Reception ==
Professional ratings
Review scores
Source	Rating
AllMusic	5/5 stars

AllMusic reviewer Scott Yanow stated "a trio session with pianist Ray Bryant and bassist Tommy Bryant. There is a liberal amount of drum soloing but the early versions of Ray Bryant's "Cubano Chant" and "Little Susie" are of greatest interest".

== Track listing ==
All compositions by Ray Bryant except where noted

1. "Satin Doll" (Duke Ellington) – 5:51
2. "Little Susie" (Ray Bryant, Jo Jones, Tommy Bryant) – 5:18
3. "Spider Kelly's Blues" – 4:44
4. "Cubano Chant" – 3:58
5. "Splittin'" – 4:51
6. "Sweet Lorraine" (Cliff Burwell, Mitchell Parish) – 4:38
7. "Bicycle for Two" (Tommy Bryant) – 2:37
8. "Old Man River" (Jerome Kern, Oscar Hammerstein II) – 6:39
9. "Sometimes I'm Happy" (Vincent Youmans, Irving Caesar) – 3:27

== Personnel ==
- Jo Jones – drums
- Ray Bryant – piano
- Tommy Bryant – bass
