= Solo Flight (Ray Bryant album) =

Studio album by Ray Bryant
- Released: 1977
- Recorded: December 21, 1976
- Studio: RCA Recording Studios, New York, NY
- Genre: Jazz
- Length: 47:49
- Label: Pablo; 2310 798
- Producer: Norman Granz

Ray Bryant chronology
Here's Ray Bryant (1976)	Solo Flight (1977)	Montreux '77 (1977)

Solo Flight is an album by pianist Ray Bryant recorded in 1976 and released by the Pablo label the following year.

== Reception ==
Professional ratings
Review scores
Source	Rating
AllMusic	3/5 stars
The Penguin Guide to Jazz Recordings	3/4 stars

AllMusic reviewer Scott Yanow said "Ray Bryant, although he has made many fine trio albums through the years, is at his best when playing unaccompanied solos ... This is an excellent recording".

== Track listing ==
All compositions by Ray Bryant except where noted

1. "In de Back Room" – 5:19
2. "What Are You Doing the Rest of Your Life?" (Michel Legrand, Alan Bergman, Marilyn Bergman) – 4:17
3. "Monkey Business" – 4:07
4. "Blues in de Big Brass Bed" – 7:14
5. "Moanin'" (Bobby Timmons) – 4:52
6. "St. Louis Blues" (W. C. Handy) – 6:50
7. "Take the "A" Train" (Billy Strayhorn) – 5:03
8. "Lullaby" – 2:50

== Personnel ==
- Ray Bryant – piano
