= Halleloo-Y'-All =

Studio album by Red Garland
- Released: 1964
- Recorded: July 15, 1960
- Studio: Van Gelder Studio, Englewood Cliffs, New Jersey
- Genre: Jazz
- Length: 39:40
- Label: Prestige; PRLP 7288
- Producer: 37:38

Red Garland chronology
Alone with the Blues (1960)	Halleloo-Y'-All (1964)	Soul Burnin' (1959–61)

Professional ratings
Review scores
Source	Rating
AllMusic	3/5 stars

Halleloo-Y'-All is an album by American pianist, composer and bandleader Red Garland which was recorded in 1960 and released on the Prestige label.

== Track listing ==
All compositions by Red Garland, except where noted.

1. "Revelation Blues" – 6:11
2. "I'll Never Be Free" (Bennie Benjamin, George David Weiss) – 11:06
3. "Every Time I Feel the Spirit" (Traditional) – 4:48
4. "Halleloo-Y'all" – 6:36
5. "Back Slidin'" – 6:57

== Personnel ==
- Red Garland – piano, organ
- Sam Jones – bass
- Art Taylor – drums
