= Duets (Dizzy Gillespie album) =

Studio album by Dizzy Gillespie
- Released: Mid March 1958
- Recorded: December 11, 1957
- Studio: Nola Studios, NYC
- Genre: Jazz
- Length: 39:18
- Label: Verve; MGV 8260
- Producer: Norman Granz

Dizzy Gillespie chronology
Sittin' In (1958)	Duets (1958)	Sonny Side Up (1959)

Duets is a 1958 album by American jazz trumpeter Dizzy Gillespie featuring Sonny Rollins and Sonny Stitt, recorded in 1957 and released on the Verve label. The recordings on this album are from the same sessions and with the same personnel that produced the Sonny Side Up album which had Sonny Stitt and Sonny Rollins playing simultaneously with Dizzy Gillespie. On the Duets album, as the name implies, Sonny Stitt and Sonny Rollins played separately with Dizzy Gillespie.

== Reception ==
The AllMusic review states that "the highlights are many."

Professional ratings
Review scores
Source	Rating
AllMusic	4/5 stars

== Track listing ==
All compositions by Dizzy Gillespie

1. "Wheatleigh Hall" – 8:48
2. "Sumphin'" – 10:26
3. "Con Alma" [alternate take] – 9:08 Bonus track on CD reissue
4. "Con Alma" – 9:26
5. "Anythin'" – 10:29 Bonus track on CD reissue
6. "Haute Mon'" – 10:38

== Personnel ==
- Dizzy Gillespie – trumpet
- Sonny Stitt – tenor saxophone (tracks 3, 4, & 6), alto saxophone (track 5)
- Sonny Rollins – tenor saxophone (tracks 1 & 2)
- Ray Bryant – piano
- Tommy Bryant – bass
- Charlie Persip – drums
