= Specs Wright =

American jazz drummer (1927–1963)

Charles "Specs" Wright (September 8, 1927 - February 6, 1963) was an American jazz drummer born in Philadelphia.

Wright played drums in an Army band until his discharge in 1947. Following this he played in a group with Jimmy Heath and Howard McGhee. In 1949 he joined Dizzy Gillespie's band alongside John Coltrane, remaining until it disbanded in mid-1950. Later in 1950 he was a member of Gillespie's sextet with Coltrane, Jimmy Heath, Percy Heath, and Milt Jackson. In the 1950s, Wright played with Earl Bostic, Kenny Drew, Cannonball Adderley, Art Blakey, and Carmen McRae, and gigged locally in Philadelphia. He was with Hank Mobley in 1958 with his septet alongside Billy Root, Curtis Fuller, Ray Bryant, Tommy Bryant, and Lee Morgan. Following this Wright played with Sonny Rollins, Betty Carter, Red Garland, Coleman Hawkins, and Lambert, Hendricks and Ross. He died in 1963. He was interred in Beverly National Cemetery in Beverly, New Jersey.

== Discography ==
With Cannonball Adderley

- In the Land of Hi-Fi with Julian Cannonball Adderley (EmArcy, 1956)

With Nat Adderley

- To the Ivy League from Nat (EmArcy, 1956)

With Art Blakey

- Drum Suite (Columbia, 1957)
- Orgy in Rhythm (Blue Note, 1957)

With Ray Bryant

- Ray Bryant Trio (Prestige, 1957)

With Betty Carter

- Out There (Peacock, 1958)

With Kenny Drew

- Kenny Drew and His Progressive Piano (Norgran, 1953–54)

With Red Garland

- Coleman Hawkins with the Red Garland Trio (Swingville, 1959) - with Coleman Hawkins
- Satin Doll (Prestige, 1959 [1971])
- Red Garland at the Prelude (Prestige, 1959)
- Lil' Darlin' (Status, 1959)
- Red Garland Live! (New Jazz, 1959)

With Hank Mobley, Curtis Fuller, Lee Morgan and Billy Root

- Monday Night at Birdland (Roulette, 1958)
- Another Monday Night at Birdland (Roulette, 1959)

With Sonny Rollins

- Sonny Rollins and the Big Brass (MetroJazz, 1958)
