= MCMLXX (album) =

Studio album by Ray Bryant
- Released: 1970
- Recorded: March 4–5 & 18 and April 14, 1970
- Studio: Atlantic Studios in NYC
- Genre: Jazz
- Length: 34:09
- Label: Atlantic; SD 1564
- Producer: Joel Dorn

Ray Bryant chronology
Sound Ray (1969)	MCMLXX (1970)	Alone at Montreux (1972)

MCMLXX is an album by American jazz pianist Ray Bryant released on the Atlantic label in 1970.

== Reception ==
Professional ratings
Review scores
Source	Rating
AllMusic	3/5 stars

AllMusic reviewer Scott Yanow stated: "The colorful results are not essential but are less dated than one might think".

== Track listing ==
All compositions by Ray Bryant, except as indicated

1. "Stick with It" - 5:51
2. "Let It Be" (John Lennon, Paul McCartney) - 4:01
3. "Bridge over Troubled Water" (Paul Simon) - 3:20
4. "Hey Jude" (Lennon, McCartney) - 4:50
5. "Shake-a-Lady" - 2:38
6. "Unchained Melody" (Alex North, Hy Zaret) - 4:45
7. "My Cherie Amour" (Henry Cosby, Stevie Wonder, Sylvia Moy) - 4:56
8. "Spinning Wheel" (David Clayton-Thomas) - 3:39

Recorded at Atlantic Studios on March 4 (tracks 4 & 8), March 5 (track 7), March 18 (tracks 1, 5 & 6) and April 14 (tracks 2 & 3), 1970

== Personnel ==
- Ray Bryant - piano
- Chuck Rainey - electric bass
- Jimmy Johnson - drums
- Joe Newman - trumpet (track 2)
- Garnett Brown - trombone (track 2)
- George Dorsey - alto saxophone (track 2)
- King Curtis (track 2), Joe Gentle (tracks 1, 3 & 4) - tenor saxophone
- Leon Cohen - bass clarinet (tracks 1, 3 & 4)
- Pepper Adams - baritone saxophone (track 2)
- Emanuel Green, Gene Orloff, Joseph Malignaggi, Julien Barber, Matthew Raimondi, Noel Dacosta, Paul Gershman, Selwart Clarke, Winston Collymore - violin (tracks 1, 3 & 4)
- Charles McCracken - cello (tracks 1, 3 & 4)
- Ron Carter - acoustic bass (tracks 1, 3 & 4)
- Eumir Deodato (tracks 1, 3 & 4), Arif Mardin (track 2) - arranger
