= Alone with the Blues (Red Garland album) =

Studio album by Red Garland
- Released: 1960
- Recorded: April 2, 1960
- Studio: Van Gelder Studio, Englewood Cliffs, NJ
- Genre: Jazz
- Length: 39:52
- Label: Moodsville; MVLP 10

Red Garland chronology
Red Alone (1960)	Alone with the Blues (1960)	Halleloo-Y'-All (1960)

Alone with the Blues is a solo album by pianist Red Garland recorded in 1960 and released on the Moodsville label.

== Track listing ==
1. "In the Evening (When the Sun Goes Down)" (Leroy Carr) - 5:24
2. "Blues in the Closet" (Oscar Pettiford) - 4:20
3. "Chains of Love" (Ahmet Nugetre, Harry Van Walls) - 5:59
4. "Tired" (Alan Roberts, Doris Fisher) - 6:35
5. "Sent for You Yesterday (And Here You Come Today)" (Count Basie, Jimmy Rushing, Eddie Durham) - 5:06
6. "Trane's Blues" (John Coltrane) - 5:49
7. "Wee Baby Blues" (Pete Johnson, Big Joe Turner) - 6:56
8. "Cloudy" (Mary Lou Williams) - 4:49

== Personnel ==
- Red Garland - piano
