= Sittin' In (Dizzy Gillespie album) =

Studio album by Dizzy Gillespie, Stan Getz, Paul Gonsalves and Coleman Hawkins
- Released: 1958
- Recorded: June 26, 1957
- Studio: WOR, NYC
- Genre: Jazz
- Length: 51:59
- Label: Verve; MG V-8225
- Producer: Norman Granz

Dizzy Gillespie chronology
Birks' Works (1958)	Sittin' In (1958)	Duets (1958)

Professional ratings
Review scores
Source	Rating
AllMusic	3/5 stars

Sittin' In is a 1958 studio album by American jazz musicians Dizzy Gillespie, Stan Getz, Paul Gonsalves and Coleman Hawkins.

== Track listing ==
=== Side 1 ===
1. "Dizzy Atmosphere" (Dizzy Gillespie) – 10:57
2. "I'm Thru' with Love"/"Without a Word of Warning"/"Sweet Lorraine"/"Love Walked In"/"September Song" (Gus Kahn, Fud Livingston, Matty Malneck)/(Mack Gordon, Harry Revel)/(Cliff Burwell, Mitchell Parish)/(George Gershwin, Ira Gershwin)/(Kurt Weill, Maxwell Anderson) – 11:00

=== Side 2 ===
1. "On the Alamo"/"Stompin' at the Savoy"/"This Time the Dream's on Me"/"Time After Time"/"Gone with the Wind" (Kahn, Isham Jones)/(Edgar Sampson, Benny Goodman, Chick Webb, Andy Razaf)/(Harold Arlen, Johnny Mercer)/(Sammy Cahn, Jule Styne)/(Herb Magidson, Allie Wrubel) – 12:29
2. "The Way You Look Tonight" (Jerome Kern, Dorothy Fields) – 13:38

== Personnel ==
- Dizzy Gillespie – trumpet
- Stan Getz – tenor saxophone
- Paul Gonsalves – tenor saxophone
- Coleman Hawkins – tenor saxophone
- Wynton Kelly – piano
- Wendell Marshall – bass
- J.C. Heard – drums
