= Alone with the Blues (Ray Bryant album) =

Studio album by Ray Bryant
- Released: End of May/early June 1959
- Recorded: December 19, 1958
- Studio: Van Gelder Studio, Hackensack, New Jersey
- Genre: Jazz
- Length: 37:49
- Label: New Jazz; NJLP 8213
- Producer: Esmond Edwards

Ray Bryant chronology
Ray Bryant Trio (1957)	Alone with the Blues (1959)	Ray Bryant Plays (1959)

Alone with the Blues is a solo album recorded by American jazz pianist Ray Bryant in 1958 for the New Jazz label.

== Reception ==
Professional ratings
Review scores
Source	Rating
AllMusic	3/5 stars
The Penguin Guide to Jazz	3.5/4 stars
Encyclopedia of Popular Music	5/5 stars

Scott Yanow, in his review for AllMusic states, "Ray Bryant's first solo piano album is rightfully considered a classic. Bryant, at the time thought of as a young modern traditionalist, has always felt perfectly at home playing the blues... highly recommended".

== Track listing ==
All compositions by Ray Bryant except where noted.

1. "Blues No. 3" – 7:15
2. "Joy (Blues No. 2)" – 3:59
3. "Lover Man" (Jimmy Davis, Ram Ramirez, Jimmy Sherman) – 3:52
4. "Me and the Blues (Blues No. 1)" – 5:00
5. "My Blues (Blues No. 5)" – 7:40
6. "Rockin' Chair" (Hoagy Carmichael) – 5:16
7. "Stocking Feet" – 4:47

== Personnel ==
- Ray Bryant – piano
