= Montreux '77 (Ray Bryant album) =

Live album by Ray Bryant
- Released: 1977
- Recorded: July 13, 1977
- Venue: Montreux Jazz Festival, Switzerland
- Genre: Jazz
- Length: 48:50
- Label: Pablo; 2308-201
- Producer: Norman Granz

Ray Bryant chronology
| Solo Flight (1976) | Montreux '77 (1977) | All Blues (1978) |

Montreux '77 is a live album by pianist Ray Bryant recorded at the Montreux Jazz Festival in 1977 and released by the Pablo label.

== Reception ==
Professional ratings
Review scores
| Source | Rating |
|---|---|
| AllMusic | 4.5/5 stars |
| The Penguin Guide to Jazz Recordings | 3/4 stars |

AllMusic reviewer Scott Yanow awarded the album 4.5 stars and said that Bryant's "distinctive and soulful style fits well into every setting, making this an easily recommended set that will satisfy most musical tastes."

== Track listing ==
1. "Take the 'A' Train" (Billy Strayhorn) – 4:48
2. "Georgia On My Mind" (Hoagy Carmichael, Stuart Gorrell) – 4:54
3. "Jungle Town Jubilee" (Lloyd Glenn) – 3:19
4. "If I Could Just Make It To Heaven" (traditional) – 4:09
5. "Django" (John Lewis) – 4:16
6. "Blues No. 6" (Ray Bryant) – 7:40
7. "Satin Doll" (Duke Ellington, Johnny Mercer, Billy Strayhorn) – 4:38
8. "Sometimes I Feel Like a Motherless Child" (traditional) – 4:35
9. "St. Louis Blues" (W. C. Handy) – 5:52
10. "Things Ain't What They Used To Be" (Mercer Ellington, Ted Persons) – 4:37

== Personnel ==
- Ray Bryant – piano
