= Ray Bryant Trio (1957 album) =

1957 studio album by Ray Bryant

The Ray Bryant Trio

Studio album by Ray Bryant
- Released: 1957
- Recorded: April 5, 1957
- Studio: Van Gelder Studio, Hackensack, NJ
- Genre: Jazz, blues
- Label: Prestige; PR 7068

Ray Bryant chronology
Ray Bryant Trio (1956)	The Ray Bryant Trio (1957)	Alone with the Blues (1958)

Ray Bryant Trio is a 1957 album by American jazz pianist Ray Bryant with drummer Specs Wright and bassist Ike Isaacs that was recorded on April 5, 1957, at Van Gelder Studio and released as Prestige 7098.

== Reception ==
Professional ratings
Review scores
Source	Rating
AllMusic	4/5 stars
The Penguin Guide to Jazz Recordings	3/4 stars

AllMusic reviewer Ron Wynn awarded the album 4 stars, calling it "outstanding" and noting that it displays Bryant's "facility with the blues, speed, gospel influence, and interpretive abilities."

== Track listing ==
1. "Golden Earrings" (Ray Evans / Jay Livingston / Victor Young) – 4:53
2. "Angel Eyes" (Earl Brent / Matt Dennis) – 3:23
3. "Blues Changes" (Ray Bryant) – 5:03
4. "Splittin'" (Ray Bryant) – 4:38
5. "Django" (John Lewis) – 5:05
6. "The Thrill is Gone" (Lew Brown / Ray Henderson) – 4:56
7. "Daahoud" (Clifford Brown) – 4:04
8. "Sonar" (Kenny Clarke / Gerald Wiggins) – 3:23

== Personnel ==
- Ray Bryant — piano
- Ike Isaacs — double bass
- Specs Wright — drums
