= Ray Bryant Trio (1956 album) =

Studio album by Ray Bryant
- Released: 1956
- Recorded: April 3 and May 3 & 11, 1956
- Studio: New York City
- Genre: Jazz
- Length: 34:56
- Label: Epic; LN 3279

Ray Bryant chronology
| Meet Betty Carter and Ray Bryant (1955) | Ray Bryant Trio (1956) | Ray Bryant Trio (1957) |

Ray Bryant Trio is an album by pianist Ray Bryant recorded in 1956 for the Epic label.

Professional ratings
Review scores
| Source | Rating |
|---|---|
| Allmusic | 3/5 stars |

== Track listing ==
All compositions by Ray Bryant, except where indicated.

1. "Cubano Chant" – 3:06
2. "Off Shore" (Leo Diamond, Steve Graham) – 3:56
3. "Well, You Needn't" (Thelonious Monk) – 3:19
4. "Cry Me a River" (Arthur Hamilton) – 3:51
5. "In a Mellow Tone" (Duke Ellington) – 4:22
6. "You're My Thrill" (Burton Lane, Ned Washington) – 4:23
7. "Night in Tunisia" (Dizzy Gillespie, Felix Paparelli) – 2:41
8. "Goodbye" (Gordon Jenkins) – 3:58
9. "Philadelphia Bound" – 2:35
10. "Pawn Ticket" – 2:49
11. "The Breeze and I" (Ernesto Lecuona, Al Stillman) – 3:28
12. "It's a Pity to Say Goodnight" (Billy Reid) – 2:24

- Recorded in NYC on April 3, 1956 (tracks 2, 4, 8 & 9), May 3, 1956 (tracks 1, 5–7 & 11), and May 11, 1956 (tracks 3, 10 & 12)

== Personnel ==
- Ray Bryant – piano
- Wyatt Ruther – bass
- Kenny Clarke (tracks 2, 4, 8 & 9), Osie Johnson (tracks 3, 10 & 12), Jo Jones (tracks 1, 5–7 & 11) – drums
- Candido – percussion (tracks 1 & 7)
