= Ike Isaacs (bassist) =

American jazz musician (1923–1981)

- Born: Charles Isaacs; March 28, 1923; Akron, Ohio, U.S.
- Died: February 27, 1981 (aged 57) Atlanta, Georgia, U.S.
- Genres: Jazz
- Instruments: Double bass

Charles "Ike" Isaacs (March 28, 1923 – February 27, 1981) was an American jazz double bassist from Greater Cleveland.

== Early life ==
Born in Akron, Ohio, Isaacs played trumpet and tuba as a child before settling on bass.

== Career ==
Isaacs served in the Army during World War II, where he took lessons from Wendell Marshall. Following this he played with Tiny Grimes (1948–50), Earl Bostic (1951–53), Paul Quinichette (1953), and Bennie Green (1956). He led a band locally in Ohio in 1956, then played for two years in the trio of Carmen McRae, whom he married late in the decade. He worked with Lambert, Hendricks and Ross, then with Count Basie (1962), Gloria Lynne (1962–64), and Erroll Garner (1966–70), as well as with his own small groups. He recorded only once as a leader, in 1967 for RGB Records. On this recording he plays in a trio with Jack Wilson on piano and Jimmie Smith on drums.

== Discography ==
=== As leader or co-leader ===
- Maxine Sullivan with the Ike Isaacs Quartet (Audiophile, 1981) Maxine Sullivan with the Ike Isaacs Quartet
- Enjoy Yourself! (Audiophile, 1986) Maxine Sullivan, Bob Haggart, Ike Isaacs featuring Dardanelle, Sil Austin, Dan Wall
- At the Pied Piper (RGB, 1992)

=== As sideman ===
With Count Basie

- Back with Basie (Roulette, 1962)
- Basie in Sweden (Roulette, 1962)

With Lambert, Hendricks & Ross

- High Flying (Columbia, 1961)
- Everybody's Boppin (Columbia, 1989)
- The Hottest New Group in Jazz (Columbia, 1996)

With others

- Roy Brown, Laughing But Crying (Route 66, 1977)
- Roy Brown, Good Rocking Tonight (Route 66, 1978)
- Ray Bryant, Piano Piano Piano Piano... (Prestige, 1957)
- Harry Edison & Eddie Lockjaw Davis, Jawbreakers (Riverside, 1962)
- Pee Wee Erwin, Swingin' That Music (Jazzology, 1980)
- Ella Fitzgerald, Billie Holiday & Carmen McRae, At Newport (Verve, 2000)
- Erroll Garner, Up in Erroll's Room (MGM, 1968)
- Erroll Garner, Erroll Garner Plays Gershwin and Kern (EmArcy, 1985)
- Bennie Green & Paul Quinichette, Blow Your Horn (Decca, 1956)
- Bennie Green, Soul Stirrin' (Blue Note, 1958)
- Al Grey, Boss Bone (Argo, 1964)
- Jon Hendricks, A Good Git-Together (World Pacific 1959)
- Jon Hendricks, Fast Livin' Blues (Columbia, 1962)
- Carmen McRae, A New Voice in Jazz (Brunswick, 1958)
- Carmen McRae, Mad About the Man (Decca, 1958)
- Big Miller, Revelations and the Blues (Columbia, 1961)
- Esther Phillips, Burnin (Atlantic, 1970)
- Esther Phillips, Confessin' the Blues (Atlantic, 1976)
- Dan Wall, The Trio (Audiophile, 1982)
- Jack Wilson, Song for My Daughter (Blue Note, 1969)
- Joe Williams, Joe Williams Live! A Swingin' Night at Birdland (Roulette, 1962)
