= Ray Bryant =

American pianist (1931–2011)

Background information
- Born: Raphael Homer Bryant; December 24, 1931; Philadelphia, Pennsylvania, U.S.
- Died: June 2, 2011 (aged 79) New York City, U.S.
- Genre: Jazz
- Occupations: Musician; composer; arranger
- Instrument: Piano
- Years active: 1940s–2000s
- Labels: Columbia; Sue; Cadet; Pablo; EmArcy

Raphael Homer "Ray" Bryant (December 24, 1931 – June 2, 2011) was an American jazz pianist, composer, and arranger.

== Early life ==
Bryant was born in Philadelphia, Pennsylvania, on December 24, 1931. His mother was an ordained minister who had taught herself to play the piano; his father also played the piano and sang. His brothers were the bass player Tommy, drummer and singer Len, and Lynwood. Ray began playing the piano around the age of six or seven, following the example of his mother and his sister, Vera. Gospel influences in his playing came from being part of the church at this stage in his early life. He had switched from classical music to jazz by his early teens and played the double bass at junior high school. He was first paid to play when he was 12: "I would play for dances, and they'd sneak me into bars. I'd get four or five bucks a night, which was good money then." He turned professional aged 14, and immediately joined a local band led by Mickey Collins.

== Later life and career ==
=== 1946–1958 ===
After three years working on and off in Collins's band, Bryant toured with guitarist Tiny Grimes (1948–49). He was then a solo pianist based in Syracuse, New York, for a year. After returning to Philadelphia, he played Dixieland in Billy Kretchmer's club for around two years. He attracted more attention after becoming house pianist at the Blue Note club in Philadelphia in 1953. He was there until 1956, accompanying many leading players such as Lester Young, Charlie Parker, Miles Davis, and Sonny Stitt. Davis and Sonny Rollins both liked Bryant's playing enough to record with him in New York in 1955: on Quintet/Sextet and Work Time, respectively.

These albums were for Prestige Records, for whom Bryant "began a period as an occasional house pianist", also recording with "Art Taylor (1957), Tiny Grimes and Coleman Hawkins (both 1958–9), [...] and as a leader (1957–8)." In this period, he was also the accompanist for singer Carmen McRae (1956–57). Bryant was a member of trumpeter Dizzy Gillespie's small and big bands for four months in 1957. Bryant recorded under drummer Art Blakey for several studio albums in 1957–58. Decades later, he commented: "The sessions I recorded with him helped put me on the map as a musician". Bryant was also part of drummer Jo Jones's trio in 1958. The pianist was able to learn from Jones: "He could sense when you weren't relaxed and would say, 'Take your time and breathe!' He also taught me about pacing a set. I still use his format today," commented Bryant around 2004.

=== 1959–1971 ===
In 1959, Bryant settled in New York. There, he played both mainstream jazz and the newer hard bop. His earlier period at the Blue Note in Philadelphia helped him find work, since he already knew a lot of the musicians who were based in New York.

For three months in 1959, Bryant was the pianist in singer Ella Fitzgerald's small band. He recorded with "Hal Singer, Arnett Cobb, Benny Golson, Lem Winchester, and Oliver Nelson" in 1959.

For around ten years from this point, Bryant's own trio contained bassists including his brother Tommy Bryant, and Jimmy Rowser, and drummers including Walter Perkins, Mickey Roker, Grady Tate, and Freddie Waits. He formed his own trio and was signed by producer and talent scout John Hammond to Columbia Records in 1960. Their first album contained the hit single "Little Susie", a blues created when Bryant was with Jones. Signature Records responded immediately by releasing their own version of Bryant playing the same tune. This version, sold as "Little Susie (Part 4)", reached No. 12 on the Billboard Hot R&B chart.

Hammond also paired Bryant with singer Aretha Franklin for the album Aretha: With The Ray Bryant Combo in 1960. Bryant was in Baltimore with Hammond when the Madison dance craze was developing and, at the producer's suggestion, adapted an earlier composition for the dance – it was renamed "Madison Time". This reached No. 30 on the Billboard Hot 100 chart in 1960. Another Bryant single – "Sack o' Woe" – appeared on the R&B chart in 1961.

In 1963, Bryant switched to Sue Records and recorded the first of four albums for the label. Three years later, he was with Cadet Records, "which recorded him in a variety of contexts, from trio to orchestral. The range of material was also varied, mixing jazz standards with pop hits of the day." Despite not having studied arranging formally, Bryant also fulfilled this role for several horn and strings charts for Cadet.

He had another top-100 hit with a cover version of Bobbie Gentry's "Ode to Billie Joe" in 1967. The crossover success that Bryant had irritated some jazz purists, but Bryant maintained that he was unconcerned and had been playing such material in clubs for years before the recordings became commercially successful.

Tommy and Ray Bryant formed a trio, with Oz Perkins as the back-up band, for the off-Broadway run of the comedy show Cambridge Circus, at Square East in 1964. The show starred John Cleese, Bill Oddie, Tim Brooke-Taylor, David Hatch, Jo Kendall, Graham Chapman, Jonathan Lynn, and Jean Hart.

=== 1972–2011 ===
"It was usually in a trio, duo or solo context that Bryant chose to perform and record for the remainder of his career". A performance at the 1972 Montreux Jazz Festival led to Bryant also getting more work as a solo pianist. This was his first trip to Europe and Bryant was nervous about playing to an audience of thousands, but the performance was a success, and was released as the album Alone at Montreux by Atlantic Records. He toured Europe frequently from the 1970s. He also played electric piano in the 1970s.

In 1982, he was the guest on Marian McPartland's Piano Jazz radio program. In the following year, he played in New York in a trio led by saxophonist Buddy Tate.

Between 1976 and 1980, Bryant recorded five albums for Pablo Records. For the following seven years, he did not record as a leader: "The record companies didn't bother me and I didn't bother them," he later commented. This ended when an admiring producer for Japanese Polygram recruited him: Bryant recorded 10 albums for them (also released on EmArcy) between 1987 and 1995. His 1989 album All Mine and Yours contained only his own compositions, and was recorded while touring Japan.

In the mid-1990s, he recorded with Ray Brown and Lewis Nash as a trio, toured internationally as an unaccompanied soloist, and visited Japan and Europe in the group 100 Golden Fingers". He played with Benny Golson in New York in 1997.

In the 2000s, most of his performances were in Europe and Japan, and he reduced his schedule. Solo piano recordings from performances at Rutgers University in 2004 and 2008 were released on the CD In the Back Room.

Bryant died on June 2, 2011, at the age of 79 in Queens, New York, after a long illness.

== Family ==
The musicians Kevin Eubanks, Duane Eubanks, and Robin Eubanks are the sons of Bryant's sister, Vera.

== Playing and composing style ==
Bryant's style was initially influenced by pianists Art Tatum and Teddy Wilson, but blues and gospel elements soon grew stronger in his playing. Bryant was not known as an innovator, but had a readily recognisable style of his own. He said that he liked to transfer elements of the Count Basie Orchestra to the piano. A writer commented that Bryant's "solo works are often like carefully crafted sonatas with dramatic changes in mood, tempo and dynamics".

"Bryant had a firm touch and an unshakable sense of time, notably in his left hand, which he often used to build a bedrock vamp. Even in a bebop setting, he favored the ringing tonalities of the gospel church." "In his solo playing, [...] he often played blues figures in the right hand against stride or boogie-woogie patterns in the left. On his recordings as an accompanist the influence of blues and boogie-woogie is less strong and he plays in a variety of styles."

Bryant was also a composer, with well-known themes such as "Cubano Chant", "The Madison Time", "Monkey Business", and "Little Susie" to his credit. He said that he did not consciously endeavor to compose music: "An idea will just come to me while I'm doing something else and if it sticks, I develop it into a tune." Ed Berger wrote in JazzTimes that Bryant's compositions "share many of the attractive melodic and rhythmic qualities that make his playing so widely accessible", and vary in style from Latin, blues-based, to more lyrical ballads, waltzes and calypsos.

== Discography ==
=== As leader ===
Date recorded	Title	Label	Year released	Personnel/Notes
1955–05	Meet Betty Carter and Ray Bryant	Columbia	1955	Some tracks trio, with Wendell Marshall (bass), Philly Joe Jones (drums); some tracks quartet, with Betty Carter (vocals) added; some tracks quintet, with Jerome Richardson (flute) added
1956–04, 1956–05	Ray Bryant Trio	Epic	1956	Most tracks trio, with Wyatt Ruther (bass), Kenny Clarke, Osie Johnson and Jo Jones (drums; separately); some tracks quartet, with Candido (percussion) added
1957–04	Ray Bryant Trio	Prestige	1957	Trio, with Ike Isaacs (bass), Specs Wright (drums)
1958–12	Alone with the Blues	New Jazz	1959	Solo piano
1959–10, 1959–11	Ray Bryant Plays	Signature	1960	Trio, with Tommy Bryant (bass), Oliver Jackson (drums)
1959–12, 1960–01	Little Susie	Columbia	1960	Trio, with Tommy Bryant (bass), Oliver Jackson and Eddie Locke (drums; separately)
1960–03, 1960–07	Madison Time	Columbia	1960	Sextet, with Harry Edison (trumpet), Al Grey, Urbie Green and Benny Morton (trombone; separately), Buddy Tate (tenor sax), Tommy Bryant (bass), Billy English, Jimmy Griffin and Dave Pochonet (drums; separately)
1960–11, 1961–01	Con Alma	Columbia	1961	One track solo piano; most tracks trio, with Arthur Harper and Bill Lee (bass; separately), Mickey Roker (drums)
1960–12, 1961–10	Dancing the Big Twist	Columbia	1961	Most tracks with Pat Jenkins and Joe Newman (trumpet), Matthew Gee (trombone), Buddy Tate (tenor sax), Jimmy Rowser (bass), Mickey Roker (drums); one track with Don Covay (vocals) added; one track with Harry Edison (trumpet), Ben Richardson (baritone sax), Bill Lee (bass), Gus Johnson (drums), Ray Barretto (congas)
1962–03, 1962–04	Hollywood Jazz Beat	Columbia	1962	With orchestra
1963–05, 1963–06	Groove House	Sue	1963	Most tracks trio, with Tommy Bryant (bass), Bobby Donaldson and Panama Francis (drums; separately); some tracks quartet, with Wally Richardson (guitar) added
1964	Live at Basin Street East	Sue	1964	Trio, with Jimmy Rowser (bass), Ben Riley (drums); in concert
1964	Cold Turkey	Sue	1964	Trio, with Jimmy Rowser (bass), Ben Riley (drums)
1964	Soul	Sue	1965	Most tracks trio, with Tommy Bryant (bass), Sonny Brown and Walter Perkins (drums; separately); some tracks quartet, with Wally Richardson (guitar) added
1966–02	Gotta Travel On	Cadet	1966	Quintet, with Clark Terry (flugelhorn), Snooky Young (trumpet), Walter Booker (bass), Freddie Waits (drums)
1966–09	Lonesome Traveler	Cadet	1966	Quintet, with Clark Terry (flugelhorn, trumpet), Snooky Young (trumpet), Jimmy Rowser (bass), Freddie Waits (drums)
1966–12	Slow Freight	Cadet	1967	Quintet, with Art Farmer and Snooky Young (trumpet, flugelhorn), Richard Davis (bass), Freddie Waits (drums)
1967–05	The Ray Bryant Touch	Cadet	1967	Trio, with Jimmy Rowser (bass), Rudy Collins (drums)
1967–08, 1967–11	Take a Bryant Step	Cadet	1967	With orchestra
1968–02	Up Above the Rock	Cadet	1968	Quintet, with Dobbie Hiques (trumpet), Snooky Young and Danny Moore (trumpet; separately), Ron Carter (bass), Grady Tate (drums)
1969–06	Sound Ray	Cadet	1969	Trio, with Jimmy Rowser (bass), Harold White (drums)
1970–03, 1970–04	MCMLXX	Atlantic	1970	Some tracks trio, with Chuck Rainey (electric bass), Jimmy Johnson (drums); some tracks with others – Joe Newman (trumpet), Garnett Brown (trombone), George Dorsey (alto sax), King Curtis and Joe Gentle (tenor sax; separately), Leon Cohen (bass clarinet), Pepper Adams (baritone sax), Charles McCracken (cello), Ron Carter (acoustic bass), Emanuel Green, Gene Orloff, Joseph Malignaggi, Julien Barber, Matthew Raimondi, Noel Dacosta, Paul Gershman, Selwart Clarke and Winston Collymore (violin)
1972–06	Alone at Montreux	Atlantic	1972	Solo piano; in concert
1974?	In the Cut	Cadet	1974	With orchestra: Marvin Stamm and Joe Wilder (trumpet), George Marge (flute, tenor sax, oboe), Alfred Brown, Paul Gershman, Harry Gilckman, Emanuel Green and Max Poliakoff (violin), Julian Barber, Selwart Clarke and Theodore Israel (viola), Margaret Ross (harp), John Tropea (guitar), Richard Davis (bass), Jimmy Johnson (drums), Montego Joe (congas), Charles Stepney (synthesizer)
1975–10	Hot Turkey	Black & Blue	1975	4 tracks solo piano; 3 tracks trio, with Major Holley (bass), Panama Francis (drums)
1976–01	Here's Ray Bryant	Pablo	1976	Trio, with George Duvivier (bass), Grady Tate (drums)
1976–12	Solo Flight	Pablo	1977	Solo piano
1977–07	Montreux '77	Pablo	1977	Solo piano; in concert
1978–04	All Blues	Pablo	1978	Trio, with Sam Jones (bass), Grady Tate (drums)
1980–05	Potpourri	Pablo	1981	Trio, with Jimmy Rowser (bass), Mickey Roker (drums)
1987–02	Ray Bryant Trio Today	EmArcy (JP)	1987	Trio, with Rufus Reid (bass), Freddie Waits (drums)
1987–02	Plays Basie & Ellington	EmArcy (JP)	1987	Trio, with Rufus Reid (bass), Freddie Waits (drums)
1987–02, 1988–01	Blue Moods	EmArcy (JP)	1989	Some tracks solo piano; most tracks trio, with Rufus Reid (bass), Freddie Waits (drums)
1988–01, 1988–06	Golden Earrings	EmArcy (JP)	1988	Trio, with Rufus Reid (bass), Freddie Waits (drums)
1989–10	All Mine And Yours	EmArcy (JP)	1989	Trio, with Rufus Reid (bass), Winard Harper (drums); in concert
1991–03, 1991–04	Ray Bryant Plays Blues and Ballads	Jazz Connaisseur (CH)	1993	Solo piano
1992–03, 1991–04	Through the Years, Vol. 1	EmArcy (JP)	1992	One track solo piano; most tracks trio, with Rufus Reid (bass), Grady Tate (drums)
1992–03	Through the Years, Vol. 2	EmArcy (JP)	1992	Trio, with Rufus Reid (bass), Grady Tate (drums)
1993	Somewhere in France	Label M	2000	Solo piano; in concert
1994–02	No Problem	EmArcy (JP)	1994	Quartet, featuring Kenny Burrell (guitar) with Peter Washington (bass), Kenny Washington (drums)
1994–02	Inimitable	Jazz Connaisseur (CH)	1999	Solo piano; in concert
1994–11	Ray Bryant Meets Ray Brown + 1: Double R B	EmArcy (JP)	1995	Trio, with Ray Brown (bass), Lewis Nash (drums)
1995–10	Solo Live in Tokyo – Plays Blues and Boogie	EmArcy (JP)	1996	Solo piano; in concert
1997–01	North of the Border	Label M	2001	Trio, with Harry Anderson (bass), Winard Harper (drums)
1997–06	Ray's Tribute to His Jazz Piano Friends	JMI Jazz (JP)	1997	Trio, with Ray Drummond (bass), Winard Harper (drums)
1999–09	Plays the Blues	M & I (JP)	2000	Trio, with Ray Drummond (bass), Kenny Washington (drums)
2004–05, 2008–10	In the Back Room	Evening Star	2008	Solo piano; in concert

=== As sideman ===
Year recorded	Leader	Title	Label
1955	Miles Davis	Quintet/Sextet	Prestige
1955?	Toots Thielemans	The Sound	Columbia
1955	Sonny Rollins	Work Time	Prestige
1956?	Joe Carroll	Joe Carroll with The Ray Bryant Quintet	Epic
1956	Max Roach	Max Roach + 4	EmArcy
1956–1957	Max Roach	Jazz in ¾ Time	EmArcy
1957	Art Blakey	Drum Suite	Columbia
1957	Art Blakey	Orgy in Rhythm, Volume 1	Blue Note
1957	Art Blakey	Orgy in Rhythm, Volume 2	Blue Note
1957	Art Taylor	Taylor's Wailers	Prestige
1957	Carmen McRae	After Glow	Decca
1957	Carmen McRae	Mad About the Man	Decca
1957	Clifford Jordan	Cliff Jordan	Blue Note
1957	Coleman Hawkins	The Coleman Hawkins, Roy Eldridge, Pete Brown, Jo Jones All Stars at Newport	Verve
1957	Dizzy Gillespie	Duets	Verve
1957	Dizzy Gillespie	The Greatest Trumpet of Them All	Verve
1957	Dizzy Gillespie with Sonny Rollins, Sonny Stitt	Sonny Side Up	Verve
1957	Lee Morgan	City Lights	Blue Note
1958?	Mae Barnes	Mae Barnes	Vanguard
1958	Aaron Bell	Music From "Peter Gunn"	Lion/MGM
1958	Art Blakey	Holiday for Skins, Volume 1	Blue Note
1958	Art Blakey	Holiday for Skins, Volume 2	Blue Note
1958	Benny Golson	Benny Golson and the Philadelphians	United Artists
1958	Benny Golson	Groovin' with Golson	New Jazz
1958	Budd Johnson	Blues a la Mode	Felsted
1958	Coleman Hawkins	Soul	Prestige
1958	Jerry Valentine	Outskirts of Town	Prestige
1958	Jo Jones	Jo Jones Plus Two	Vanguard
1958	Tiny Grimes	Blues Groove	Prestige
1958	Tiny Grimes	Callin' the Blues	Prestige
1958	Hank Mobley, Curtis Fuller, Lee Morgan and Billy Root	Monday Night at Birdland	Roulette
1958	Hank Mobley, Curtis Fuller, Lee Morgan and Billy Root	Another Monday Night at Birdland	Roulette
1958	Melba Liston	Melba Liston and Her 'Bones	MetroJazz
1958–1959	Charlie Shavers	Charlie Digs Dixie	MGM
1958–1959	Charlie Shavers	Charlie Digs Paree	MGM
1959	Hal Singer with Charlie Shavers	Blue Stompin'	Prestige
1959	Arnett Cobb	Party Time	Prestige
1959	Jo Jones	Jo Jones Trio	Everest
1959	Benny Golson	Gone with Golson	New Jazz
1959	Coleman Hawkins	Hawk Eyes	Prestige
1959	Jerry Valentine	Stasch	Swingville
1959	Max Roach	Moon Faced and Starry Eyed	Mercury
1959	Oliver Nelson	Meet Oliver Nelson	Prestige
1959	Tiny Grimes	Tiny in Swingville	Swingville
1960?	Jimmy Rushing	Rushing Lullabies	Columbia
1960	Charlie Shavers	Here Comes Charlie	Everest
1960	Charlie Shavers	Like Charlie	Everest
1960–1961	Aretha Franklin	Aretha: With The Ray Bryant Combo	Columbia
1963	Clark Terry	Tread Ye Lightly	Cameo
1965	Sonny Rollins	Sonny Rollins on Impulse!	Impulse!
1971	Yusef Lateef	The Gentle Giant	Atlantic
1972	Yusef Lateef	Hush 'N' Thunder	Atlantic
1973	Yusef Lateef	Part of the Search	Atlantic
1975	Roy Eldridge	Decidedly	Pablo
1976?	Zoot Sims	Soprano Sax	Pablo
1976	Al Grey	Struttin' and Shoutin'	Columbia
1976	Benny Carter	Wonderland	Pablo
1977	Benny Carter	Benny Carter 4: Montreux '77	Pablo Live
1978	Arnett Cobb	Live at Sandy's!	Muse
1978	Buddy Tate	Hard Blowin'	Muse
1978	Buddy Tate	Live at Sandy's	Muse
1978	Eddie "Cleanhead" Vinson	Live at Sandy's	Muse
1978	Eddie "Cleanhead" Vinson	Hold It Right There!	Muse
1979?	Various	Tribute to Louis Armstrong	Schweizerischer Bankverein
