= Signature Records =

- Founded: 1939
- Founder: Bob Thiele
- Defunct: 1948?
- Status: Inactive
- Genre: Jazz
- Country of origin: U.S.
- Location: New York City

Signature Records was a jazz record company and label founded in 1939 by Bob Thiele when he was 17 years old. Its roster included Coleman Hawkins, Earl Hines, Erroll Garner, and Lester Young.

At age 14, Thiele was a disc jockey for his own jazz radio show, edited his own jazz magazine, and played clarinet with bands in New York City. He started Signature at age 17. Thiele was head producer and president of the label. Its musical director was orchestra leader Ray Bloch.

Some sources recite that Signature closed in 1948. However, other sources indicate that the label continued to release records into the 50s, but that by the late 50s it was moribund. Having freelanced and produced for Decca Records and its Coral and Brunswick labels, and served as vice president for A&R for Dot Records, Thiele announced in May 1959 that he was reactivating the Signature label. The venture appears to have been in partnership with Steve Allen, one of the co-owners of Hanover Records, who brought the label into the arrangement. The new company was known as Hanover-Signature Records. Orchestra leader Milton Delugg, who had worked with Thiele at Dot and Coral, was named musical director.

The company continued to release records on both labels. Thiele produced records for his then-wife, singer Teresa Brewer, as late as 1983. Hanover releases continued into 1961. Thiele reissued Signature recordings on his later Flying Dutchman and Doctor Jazz record labels.

== See also ==
- List of record labels
