= Tommy Bryant =

American jazz musician

Thomas Bryant (May 21, 1930 – January 3, 1982) was an American jazz double-bassist.

Bryant grew up in a musical family in Philadelphia; his mother was a choir director, his brother Ray Bryant was a pianist, and another brother, Len Bryant, is a vocalist and drummer. Tommy Bryant began playing bass at the age of 12 and played in many local outfits, including Billy Krechmer's. In the late 1940s Bryant joined Elmer Snowden's band, staying there until 1952, when he took a tour of duty during the Korean War. In 1956 he returned and formed his own trio, though he is better known for his work with musicians such as Jo Jones (1958), Charlie Shavers (1959), Roy Eldridge, Dizzy Gillespie, Barney Wilen, Benny Golson, Big Joe Turner and Coleman Hawkins. In the last ten years of his life he played in the follow-up band to The Ink Spots.

Bryant also recorded with Mahalia Jackson under the name Tom Bryant.

== Discography ==
With Ray Bryant

- Ray Bryant Plays (Signature, 1959)
- Little Susie (Columbia, 1960)
- Groove House (Sue, 1963)
- Soul (Sue, 1965)

With Dizzy Gillespie

- Duets (Verve Records, 1957)
- The Greatest Trumpet of Them All (Verve, 1957)
- Sonny Side Up (Verve, 1957) - with Sonny Rollins and Sonny Stitt

With Benny Golson

- Gone with Golson (New Jazz Records, 1959)

With Jo Jones

- One Key Up (Vanguard, 1955)
- Jo Jones Plus Two (Vanguard, 1959)
- Jo Jones Trio (Everest, 1959)

With Hank Mobley, Curtis Fuller, Lee Morgan and Billy Root

- Monday Night at Birdland (Roulette, 1958)
- Another Monday Night at Birdland (Roulette, 1959)

With Elmer Snowden

- "Harlem Banjo" (Riverside Records, 1960)
- "Saturday Night Fish Fry" (Fontana Records, 1962)

With Roy Eldridge

- The Nifty Cat (New World Records, 1970)

With Barney Wilen

- Newport `59 (Fresh Sound Records, 1959)
