= Jerry Valentine =

American jazz musician

Gerald Graham Valentine (September 13, 1914 – October 1983) was an American jazz trombonist and arranger.

Valentine received formal training in music when he was young, learning piano, composition, and music theory; he learned to play trombone on his own. In the early 1940s he composed and arranged for Earl Hines and worked in Chicago with Dallas Bartley and King Kolax; he also booked shows for the Club DeLisa. He then joined Billy Eckstine's band from 1944 to 1947 and worked later in the decade with Wynonie Harris and Buddy DeFranco.

From 1950 to 1952 Valentine was an artist and repertory man for National Records. He played with Gene Ammons in 1954, and in 1958-1959 wrote arrangements for Pepper Adams, Art Farmer, and Coleman Hawkins in the group Prestige Blues Swingers.

== Discography ==
- Outskirts of Town (Prestige, 1958)
- Stasch (Swingville, 1959)
