= Joe Thomas (tenor saxophonist) =

American jazz musician (1909–1986)

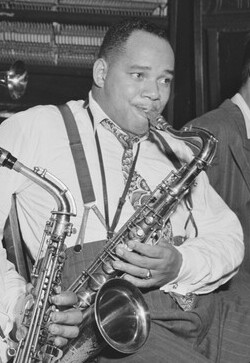
Joe Thomas, circa 1947

Joseph Vankert Thomas (June 19, 1909 – August 3, 1986) was an American jazz tenor saxophonist and vocalist.

== Biography ==
Thomas was born in Uniontown, Pennsylvania, United States, on June 19, 1909. His first band job was with the Earl Hood Orchestra. After eight months Horace Henderson offered him a job. Thomas played alto sax under Hood and Henderson, but played tenor from the time he joined Stuff Smith's band in 1932.

Thomas played with Jimmie Lunceford's band from 1933 until the leader's death in 1947, often soloing and occasionally singing. After Lunceford died, Thomas and Ed Wilcox co-led his ghost band until Thomas left to form his own septet. This band, containing trumpeter Johnny Grimes, trombonist Dicky Harris, baritone saxophonist Ben Kynard, pianist George Rhodes, bassist George Duvivier, and drummer Joe Marshall, recorded between 1949 and 1951.

Thomas then left the music industry to work for his family's undertaking business. He played occasionally, including at the 1970 Newport Jazz Festival, and recorded again under his own name in 1979. Three years later Thomas also recorded with a septet that included Grimes, Harris, and Duvivier from his band three decades earlier.

Thomas died in Kansas City, Missouri on August 3, 1986. Material from his career is held by the University of Missouri–Kansas City.

== Playing style and influence ==
Thomas's inspirations on saxophone were Coleman Hawkins and Chu Berry. As a soloist, he did not stray far from the melody and chose to emphasise rhythm. Grove Music commented that "His huge and occasionally grainy tone influenced an entire generation of saxophonists in the 1940s".

== Discography ==
=== As leader ===
==== Singles ====
- "Don't Blame Me"/"For Boobs Only" (Melodisc, 1945)
- "You're Buggin' Me (Melodisc, 1945)
- "Harlem Hop" (King, 1949)
- "Blue Shadows"/"Raw Meat" (King, 1950)
- "Big Foot" (King, 1950)
- "You're Just My Kind"/"Buttons" (King, 1951)
- "Speak Your Piece"/"I Hear Music" (Symbol, 1964) with Bill Elliott

==== Albums ====
- Speak Your Piece (Sue, 1964) with Bill Elliott
- Raw Meat (Uptown, 1979)
- Blowin' in from K.C. (Uptown, 1982); co-led with Jay McShann
