= Richard Wyands =

American jazz pianist, composer, and arranger (1928–2019)

- Born: July 2, 1928; Oakland, California, U.S.
- Died: September 25, 2019 (aged 91) New York City
- Genres: Jazz
- Occupations: Musician, composer, arranger
- Instrument: Piano
- Years active: 1944–2019

Richard Francis Wyands (July 2, 1928 – September 25, 2019) was an American jazz pianist, composer, and arranger, best known for his work as a side-man.

== Early life ==
Wyands was born in Oakland, California, on July 2, 1928 and grew up in Berkeley. He began playing the piano around the age of seven and started playing professionally in 1944, while a teenager, in San Francisco. Wyands earned a degree in music from San Francisco State College in 1950. At school and college he played piano and drums. Wyands was influenced by Count Basie, Nat King Cole, Erroll Garner, Art Tatum, and Teddy Wilson.

== Later life and career ==
In the early 1950s, Wyands was part of Vernon Alley's group that was the house band at the Black Hawk club in San Francisco, and thus part of the rhythm section that accompanied visiting soloists. The year after leaving the Black Hawk in 1954, Wyands was an intermission performer at another San Francisco club, before becoming music director for vocalist Ella Fitzgerald during a three-month period in 1956.

For ten months around 1957, he was accompanist to pop singers in a club in Ottawa, Canada. Following this, he toured with vocalist Carmen McRae for three months, and arrived in New York with her in 1958. In New York, he played with Roy Haynes, Charles Mingus (1959), Jerome Richardson (1959), and Gigi Gryce. In the 1960s Wyands was a member of Illinois Jacquet's band. Wyands worked with guitarist Kenny Burrell from 1965 to 1974.

Wyands died on September 25, 2019, in New York.

== Discography ==
=== As leader ===
Year recorded	Title	Label	Notes
1978	Then, Here and Now	Storyville	Trio, with Lisle Atkinson (bass), David Lee (drums)
1992	The Arrival	DIW	Trio, with Lisle Atkinson (bass), Leroy Williams (drums)
1995	Reunited	CrissCross	Trio, with Peter Washington (bass), Kenny Washington (drums)
1996	Get Out of Town	Steeplechase	Trio, with Peter Washington (bass), Kenny Washington (drums)
1997	Lady of the Lavender Mist	Venus	Trio, with Peter Washington (bass), Kenny Washington (drums)
1999	Half and Half	CrissCross	Trio, with Peter Washington (bass), Kenny Washington (drums)
2000	As Long as There's Music	Savant	Trio, with Ray Drummond (bass), Grady Tate (drums)

=== As sideman ===
With Gene Ammons

- Nice an' Cool (Moodsville, 1961)
- Jug (Prestige, 1961)
- Soul Summit Vol. 2 (Prestige, 1961 [1962])
- Late Hour Special (Prestige, 1961 [1964])
- Velvet Soul (Prestige, 1961 [1964])

With Kenny Burrell

- The Tender Gender (Cadet, 1966)
- A Generation Ago Today (Verve, 1967)
- Night Song (Verve, 1969)
- God Bless the Child (CTI, 1971)
- 'Round Midnight (Fantasy, 1972)
- Up the Street, 'Round the Corner, Down the Block (Fantasy, 1974)
- Stormy Monday (Fantasy, 1974 [1978])
- Prime: Live at the Downtown Room (HighNote, 1976 [2009])

With Benny Carter

- Over the Rainbow (MusicMasters, 1989)
- Cookin' at Carlos I (MusicMasters 1988 [1990])

With Jimmy Cobb

- Only for the Pure of Heart (Fable, 1998)
- Cobb's Groove (Milestone, 2003)

With Eddie "Lockjaw" Davis

- Trane Whistle (Prestige, 1960)

With Teddy Edwards

- Horn to Horn (Muse, 1994 [1996]) with Houston Person
- Midnight Creeper (HighNote, 1997)
- Smooth Sailing (HighNote, 2001 [2003])

With Frank Foster

- Manhattan Fever (Blue Note, 1968)

With Gigi Gryce

- Saying Somethin'! (New Jazz, 1960)
- The Hap'nin's (New Jazz, 1960)
- The Rat Race Blues (New Jazz, 1960)
- Reminiscin' (Mercury, 1960)
- Doin' the Gigi (Uptown, 2011)

With Roy Haynes

- Just Us (New Jazz, 1960)

With Freddie Hubbard

- First Light (CTI, 1971)

With Willis Jackson

- Really Groovin' (Prestige, 1961)
- In My Solitude (Moodsville, 1961)

With Etta Jones

- Don't Go to Strangers (Prestige, 1960)
- Something Nice (Prestige, 1961)
- Easy Living (HighNote, 2000)
- Etta Jones Sings Lady Day (HighNote, 2001)

With Bobby Kapp and Gene Perla

- Fine Wine Trio (Fine Wine Records, 2000)

With Roland Kirk

- We Free Kings (Mercury, 1961)

With Charles Mingus

- Jazz Portraits: Mingus in Wonderland (United Artists, 1959)

With Oliver Nelson

- Screamin' the Blues (New Jazz NJ8243, 1960)
- Straight Ahead (Prestige, 1961)

With Houston Person

- Person-ified (HighNote, 1997)
- My Romance (HighNote, 1998)
- Soft Lights (HighNote, 1999)
- Blue Velvet (HighNote, 2001)
- Sentimental Journey (HighNote, 2002)

With Jerome Richardson

- Roamin' with Richardson (New Jazz, 1959)

With James Spaulding

- The Smile of the Snake (HighNote, 1997)

With Buddy Tate and Al Grey

- Just Jazz (Uptown, 1984)

With Cal Tjader

- Cal Tjader: Vibist (Savoy, 1954)
- Ritmo Caliente (Fantasy, 1954)

With Warren Vaché

- Horn of Plenty (Muse, 1994)
- Talk to Me Baby (Muse, 1996)

With Richard Williams

- New Horn in Town (Candid, 1960)

With Lem Winchester

- Lem Winchester with Feeling (Moodsville, 1961)
