= Organ Grinder's Swing (disambiguation) =

"Organ Grinder's Swing" is a 1936 jazz song by Will Hudson.

Organ Grinder's Swing or Organ Grinder Swing may also refer to:

- Organ Grinder Swing, a 1965 studio album by Jimmy Smith
- Organ Grinder's Swing, a 1937 Popeye film

== See also ==
- Organ Grinder (disambiguation)
