= Will Davis (musician) =

American jazz pianist (1926–1984)

William E. Davis (February 17, 1926 – March 24, 1984) was an American jazz pianist.

== Life and career ==
Davis was born in Chicago, Illinois on February 17, 1926. After playing in Snookum Russell's territory band and with Paul Bascomb, Davis joined Howard McGhee in 1946. He went on to play with Milt Jackson and Sonny Stitt, and with Wardell Gray in Detroit. As the house pianist at the Crystal Bar, he backed Coleman Hawkins, Lester Young, and Charlie Parker with Miles Davis in 1953.

Moving to New York City in the 1950s, he played with the Kenny Burrell Quartet, and recorded with Burrell in 1964.

In March 1960, he accompanied Joe Henderson, Yusef Lateef, James Moody and Sonny Stitt in Detroit.

Davis died in Detroit, Michigan on March 24, 1984, at the age of 58.

== Discography ==
- 1948: The Howard McGhee Sextet with Milt Jackson - Howard McGhee (tp) Jimmy Heath (as, bars -1/5,7) Milt Jackson (vib) Will Davis (p) Percy Heath (b) Joe Harris (d) (Savoy MG 12026)
- 1948: In the Beginning: Milt Jackson/Sonny Stitt - Willie Wells (tp) Sonny Stitt (as) Milt Jackson (vib) Will Davis (p) Jimmy Glover (b) Dave Heard (d) (Galaxy GXY 204)
- 1959: Have Mood, Will Call . . . .Sue Records LP 1011 Will Davis (p) William Austin (b) Oliver Jackson (d)
- 1964: Soul Call - Kenny Burrell, with Will Davis (p) Kenny Burrell (g) Martin Rivera (b) Bill English (d) Ray Barretto (cga)
