= Lenny McBrowne =

American jazz drummer (1933–1980)

- Born: Leonard Louis McBrowne; January 24, 1933; Brooklyn, New York, United States
- Died: October 4, 1980 (aged 47) San Francisco, California
- Genres: Jazz, hard bop, soul jazz
- Occupations: Musician, bandleader
- Instrument: Drums
- Years active: c. 1953-1976
- Labels: Pacific Jazz, Riverside

Leonard Louis "Lenny" McBrowne (January 24, 1933 – October 4, 1980) was an American jazz drummer. He was a prolific hard bop drummer with a recording career that started in the 1950s and ended in the mid 1970s. As a bandleader he fronted Lenny McBrowne and the Four Souls, which released two albums in 1960. A disciple of Max Roach, McBrowne was often compared to Chico Hamilton due to the "suavely exotic tendencies of his solo work". Among McBrowne's own disciples is avant-garde drummer Andrew Cyrille.

== Life and career ==
Leonard Louis McBrowne was born in Brooklyn, New York City, on January 24, 1933. Influenced by his father Arnold, who was a drummer, Lenny took up drums at a young age, playing in street marching bands between ages 12 and 15, while also taking lessons on the bass. Having finished high school in 1951, he studied under Max Roach (for one year) and Sticks Evans.

McBrowne began his professional career in Pete Brown's group, which featured Paul Bley. He also played with Randy Weston and Cecil Payne in various Brooklyn clubs, and with Paul Bley's Trio in Montreal, Quebec. In 1956 he played with Tony Scott in New York, and continued performing with Paul Bley in a college tour that led to his relocation to California. His first West Coast dates included the likes of Billie Holiday, Sonny Stitt, Harold Land, Benny Golson, Curtis Fuller, Fred Katz and Sonny Rollins. In 1959, McBrowne formed his own group, The Four Souls, with pianist Terry Trotter, bassist Herbie Lewis, tenor saxophonist and composer Daniel Jackson, and trumpeter Donald Sleet. Between January and March 1960, the band recorded their debut album Lenny McBrowne and the 4 Souls, released by Pacific Jazz Records. Shortly after they relocated to New York, where they recorded their second and final album Eastern Lights on October 13, 1960, with Jimmy Bond on bass and Cannonball Adderley as producer and supervisor. Notably, McBrowne introduced bassist Charlie Haden to Ornette Coleman, having previously introduced him to Paul Bley. Two pieces from Eastern Lights were released as a single by Riverside.

McBrowne and his band received coverage from the leading jazz magazines, including High Fidelity, Billboard, Metronome and Stereo Review. The group was described as "a highly close-knit and well-rehearsed combo" with "fluid and competent soloing". After the dissolution of the band, McBrowne free-lanced with Sal Salvador, Chris Connor and Carmen McRae.

In the 1960s, he played with Sarah Vaughan, Lambert, Hendricks & Bavan, Randy Weston, Booker Ervin, Ray Bryant, Teddy Wilson, and he toured Japan with Thelonious Monk. In the second half of the 1960s, McBrowne played primarily with Ervin's band. He then relocated to San Francisco and began to perform with Kenny Burrell on a regular basis until 1976, when he made his last recording.

== Discography ==
=== As leader ===
- 1960 : Lenny McBrowne and the 4 Souls (Pacific Jazz)
- 1960 : Eastern Lights (Riverside)

=== As sideman ===
With Billie Holiday

- Lady Sings the Blues (Clef, 1956)

With Tony Scott

- The Touch of Tony Scott (RCA Victor, 1956)

With Paul Bley

- Solemn Meditation (GNP Crescendo, 1957)

With Fred Katz

- Fred Katz and his Jammers (Decca, 1959)

With Sonny Stitt

- The Hard Swing (Verve, 1959)
- Sonny Stitt Swings the Most (Verve, 1959)
- So Doggone Good (Prestige, 1972)

With Randy Weston

- Randy (Bakton, 1963)
- Blues (Trip Jazz, 1974)
- Berkshire Blues (Freedom, 1977)
- Monterey '66 (Verve, 1994)

With Sonny Criss

- Up, Up and Away (Prestige, 1967)
- Saturday Morning (Xanadu, 1975)

With Teddy Edwards

- It's All Right! (Prestige, 1967)

With Booker Ervin

- Structurally Sound (Pacific Jazz, 1967)
- Booker 'n' Brass (Pacific Jazz, 1967)
- Live at Newport '67 (bootleg, 1967)
- The In Between (Blue Note, 1968)

With Barry Harris

- Luminescence! (Prestige, 1967)

With Houston Person

- Trust in Me (Prestige, 1967)

With Pat Martino

- East! (Prestige, 1968)

With Charles McPherson

- From This Moment On! (Prestige, 1968)

With Thelonious Monk

- Monk in Tokyo (Far East, 1970)

With Kenny Burrell

- 'Round Midnight (Fantasy, 1972)
- Both Feet on the Ground (Fantasy, 1973)
- Up the Street, 'Round the Corner, Down the Block (Fantasy, 1974)
- Prime: Live at the Downtown Room (HighNote, 1976 [2009])
- Stormy Monday (Fantasy, 1978)

With Red Garland

- The Quota (MPS, 1971 [1973])

With Jon Hendricks

- Tell Me the Truth (Xanadu, 1975)

With Sam Noto

- Entrance (Xanadu, 1975)
