= Then Along Came Kenny =

Live album by Kenny Burrell
- Released: 1994
- Recorded: August 26 & 27, 1993
- Venue: Village Vanguard, NYC
- Genre: Jazz
- Length: 62:59
- Label: Paddle Wheel; KICJ 2462
- Producer: Kenny Burrell, Yuichi Nakao

Kenny Burrell chronology
Sunup to Sundown (1991)	Then Along Came Kenny (1994)	Midnight at the Village Vanguard (1994)

Then Along Came Kenny is a live album by guitarist Kenny Burrell recorded at the Village Vanguard in New York in 1993 and first released on the Japanese Paddle Wheel label as From Vanguard With Love before being re-released on Evidence Music in 1996 with the amended title.

== Reception ==
Professional ratings
Review scores
Source	Rating
Allmusic	2.5/5 stars

The Allmusic review by Rick Anderson noted "This disc documents two nights that guitarist Kenny Burrell spent at New York's famous Village Vanguard club, in front of a fine trio ... Everyone plays with wit, assurance and verve, Burrell especially; his tone is warm and rich, and he chooses notes with wisdom and logic. The problem is that his note choices are so logical that you start to wish he'd take a few more chances ... Then there's the production problem -- this album sounds like it was recorded from the room rather than from the mixing board, and as a result, Burrell's guitar is indistinct and slightly buried. Not bad, but Burrell's done better". In JazzTimes, Jim Ferguson wrote "this disc-in addition to demonstrating such lofty aspects as Burrell’s time-honed depth and consistency as an improviser-just plain cooks from start to finish ... A beautiful look at the ’90s edition of one of the instrument’s greatest players".

== Track listing ==
All compositions by Kenny Burrell except where noted

1. Opening Introduction – 0:40
2. "I Mean You" (Coleman Hawkins, Thelonious Monk) – 7:29
3. "Maya's Dance" – 8:50
4. "Yardbird Suite" (Charlie Parker) – 5:46
5. "Manteca" (Dizzy Gillespie, Chano Pozo, Gil Fuller) – 8:43
6. "Black and Tan Fantasy" (Duke Ellington, Bubber Miley) – 4:11
7. "Lament" (J. J. Johnson) – 8:42
8. "Then Along Came You" – 7:00
9. "Fungii Mama" (Blue Mitchell) – 7:21
10. "Good News Blues" – 4:11

== Personnel ==
- Kenny Burrell – guitar
- James Williams – piano
- Peter Washington – bass
- Sherman Ferguson – drums
