= Soul Call =

Soul Call may refer to:

- Soul Call (Duke Ellington album), 1967
- Soul Call (Kenny Burrell album), 1964
