= Stormy Monday (disambiguation) =

"Stormy Monday" is the common shortened form of "Call It Stormy Monday (But Tuesday Is Just as Bad)", a blues standard by T-Bone Walker.

Stormy Monday may also refer to:

- "Stormy Monday Blues", a 1942 jazz song by Earl Hines and Billy Eckstine
- Stormy Monday (Lou Rawls album), 1962
- Stormy Monday Blues (album), T-Bone Walker, 1968
- Stormy Monday (Kenny Burrell album), 1978
- Stormy Monday (film), a 1988 film
