= Got My Mojo Workin' (album) =

Studio album by Jimmy Smith
- Released: 1966
- Recorded: December 16–17, 1965
- Studios: Van Gelder Studio, Englewood Cliffs
- Genres: Jazz; soul jazz
- Length: 38:03
- Label: Verve V6-8641
- Producer: Creed Taylor

Jimmy Smith chronology
Organ Grinder Swing (1966)	Got My Mojo Workin' (1966)	La Métamorphose des cloportes (1966)

Singles from Got My Mojo Workin
- 1. "Got My Mojo Working (Part I)" Released: March 1966

Got My Mojo Workin' is a 1966 album by Jimmy Smith arranged by Oliver Nelson.

Professional ratings
Review scores
Source	Rating
Allmusic	3/5 stars

== Track listing ==
1. "Hi-Heel Sneakers" (Robert Higginbotham) – 5:03
2. "(I Can't Get No) Satisfaction" (Mick Jagger, Keith Richards) – 4:23
3. "1-2-3" (David White, John Medora, Len Barry) – 4:00
4. "Mustard Greens" (Jimmy Smith) – 5:35
5. "Got My Mojo Working" (Preston "Red" Foster) – 7:30
6. "Johnny Come Lately" (Billy Strayhorn) – 3:45
7. "C Jam Blues" (Duke Ellington) – 3:47
8. "Hobson's Hop" (Smith) – 4:00

== Personnel ==
=== Musicians ===
- Jimmy Smith – Hammond organ, vocals
- Oliver Nelson – arranger, conductor
- Kenny Burrell – guitar
- Ben Tucker, Ron Carter – double bass, (tracks 1–4)
- George Duvivier – double bass, (tracks 5–8)
- Grady Tate – drums
- Phil Woods – alto saxophone, (tracks 5–8)
- Jerome Richardson – baritone saxophone, (tracks 5–8)
- Romeo Penque – tenor saxophone, flute, (tracks 5–8)
- Ernie Royal – trumpet, (tracks 5–8)

=== Technical ===
- Creed Taylor – producer
- Rudy Van Gelder – engineer
- Val Valentin – director of engineering
- Michael Malatak – cover design
- Fred Seligo – cover photograph
- Orrin Keepnews – liner notes

== Chart performance ==
=== Album ===
Chart (1966)	Peak position	Total weeks
U.S. Billboard 200	28	27

=== Single ===
Year	Single	Chart	Position
1966	"Got My Mojo Working (Part I)"	Billboard Hot 100	51
