= Prime: Live at the Downtown Room =

Live album by Kenny Burrell
- Released: April 7, 2009
- Recorded: January 6, 1976 and December 2, 2006
- Venue: The Downtown Room, Statler Hotel, Buffalo, NY and Royce Hall, UCLA, Los Angeles, CA
- Genre: Jazz
- Length: 54:26
- Label: HighNote; HCD 7193
- Producer: Al Wallack

Kenny Burrell chronology
Ellington Is Forever Volume Two (1975)	Prime: Live at the Downtown Room (2009)	Tin Tin Deo (1977)

Prime: Live at the Downtown Room is a live album by guitarist Kenny Burrell recorded in Buffalo, NY in early 1976 (with one track from a 2006 Los Angeles concert) and released on the HighNote label in 2009.

== Reception ==
Professional ratings
Review scores
Source	Rating
Allmusic	3.5/5 stars
All About Jazz	4.5/5 stars

The Allmusic review by Michael G. Nastos said: "the sound quality is not state of the art, with Burrell's guitar a bit muffled, but the overall sound of this highly skilled group ... A commendation needs to be bestowed on High Note records for the process to finally have released these precious sessions from Burrell and this excellent quartet. A tip of the hat is also in order for one of his very best groups in terms of their cohesion and sheer talent, beyond all-star groupings on other acclaimed recordings led by the guitarist". On All About Jazz, Graham L. Flanagan stated: "The sound quality—especially during some of Wyands' solos—doesn't quite rise to the level of that heard on Burrell's Blue Note recordings. However, any lack of sonic perfection lends itself to the overall raw, intimate atmosphere. While enthusiasts will no doubt enjoy this addition to Burrell's canon, it's recommended that newbies start with his 1959 Blue Note live album, On View at the Five Spot Cafe. Once they arrive at this 1976 recording, they will already possess a deeper appreciation for Burrell's talents that will surely enhance the experience". In JazzTimes, Mike Joyce wrote: "Prime Kenny Burrell? Not really. But that doesn’t make the surfacing of this 1976 club recording any less welcome. Taped at the Downtown Room in Buffalo, N.Y., six of the seven performances that comprise Prime find the guitar master working with a trio of thoroughly compatible colleagues ... The sound quality is merely adequate, and several of the tunes will be familiar to Burrell buffs. But then again, the album’s rewards are familiar, too"

== Track listing ==
All compositions by Kenny Burrell except where noted

1. "Isabella" – 8:35
2. "Will You Still Be Mine?" (Tom Adair, Matt Dennis) – 8:32
3. "A Child Is Born" (Thad Jones) – 8:56
4. "Common Ground" (Burrell, Warren Stephens) – 8:17
5. "God Bless the Child" (Billie Holiday, Arthur Herzog Jr.) – 7:05
6. "Do What You Gotta Do" – 8:34
7. "Single Petal of a Rose" (Duke Ellington, Billy Strayhorn) – 4:27
- Recorded at The Downtown Room, Buffalo, NY on January 6, 1976 (tracks 1–6) and Royce Hall, UCLA in Los Angeles, CA on December 2, 2006 (track 7)

== Personnel ==
- Kenny Burrell – electric guitar
- Richard Wyands – piano (tracks 1–6)
- Lisle Atkinson – bass (tracks 1–6)
- Lenny McBrowne – drums (tracks 1–6)
