= Kenny Burrell in New York =

Live album by Kenny Burrell
- Released: 1981
- Recorded: December 15, 1978
- Venue: Village Vanguard, NYC
- Genre: Jazz
- Label: Muse; MR 5241
- Producer: Helen Keane

Kenny Burrell chronology
Kenny Burrell Live at the Village Vanguard (1978)	Kenny Burrell in New York (1981)	Moon and Sand (1979)

Kenny Burrell in New York is a live album by guitarist Kenny Burrell recorded at the Village Vanguard in late 1978 and released on the Muse label. The album was rereleased on CD along with Kenny Burrell Live at the Village Vanguard as 12-15-78.

== Reception ==
Professional ratings
Review scores
Source	Rating
Allmusic	4/5 stars

The Allmusic review called it a "among the finest Burrell recorded in the '70s".

== Track listing ==
1. "Pent Up House" (Sonny Rollins) – 8:59
2. "But Beautiful" (Jimmy Van Heusen, Johnny Burke) – 5:18
3. "Bags' Groove" (Milt Jackson) – 3:57
4. "Makin' Whoopee" (Walter Donaldson, Gus Kahn) – 7:22
5. "Come Rain or Come Shine" (Harold Arlen, Johnny Mercer) – 3:40
6. "Love, Your Magic Spell is Everywhere" (Edmund Goulding, Elsie Janis) – 7:43

== Personnel ==
- Kenny Burrell – electric guitar
- Larry Gales – bass
- Sherman Ferguson – drums
