= Ode to 52nd Street =

Studio album by Kenny Burrell
- Released: 1967
- Recorded: September 1967
- Studio: Tel Mar Studios, Chicago
- Genre: Jazz
- Label: Cadet; LPS 798
- Producer: Richard Evans

Kenny Burrell chronology
A Generation Ago Today (1966-67)	Ode to 52nd Street (1967)	Blues - The Common Ground (1967-68)

Ode to 52nd Street is an album by guitarist Kenny Burrell recorded in 1967 and released on the Cadet label.

== Reception ==
Professional ratings
Review scores
Source	Rating
Allmusic	3/5 stars

Allmusic awarded the album 3 stars in a review by Scott Yanow that stated "Burrell plays quite well, as usual (he is among the most consistent of jazz improvisers), and, even if the music is not all that memorable, the results are pleasing".

== Track listing ==
All compositions by Kenny Burrell and Richard Evans except as indicated

1. "Suite for Guitar and Orchestra Theme 1: So Little Time" - 5:05
2. "Suite for Guitar and Orchestra Theme 2: Growing" - 4:12
3. "Suite for Guitar and Orchestra Theme 3: Round and Round We Go" - 5:28
4. "Suite for Guitar and Orchestra Theme 4: Recapitulation" - 2:58
5. "I Want My Baby Back" - 3:00
6. "Con Alma" (Dizzy Gillespie) - 3:29
7. "Soulero" (Evans) - 3:02
8. "Wild Is the Wind" (Dimitri Tiomkin, Ned Washington) - 3:09
9. "Blues Fuse" - 3:21

== Personnel ==
- Kenny Burrell - guitar
- Orchestra arranged and conducted by Richard Evans
