= A la Carte (Kenny Burrell album) =

Live album by Kenny Burrell with Rufus Reid
- Released: 1985
- Recorded: August 23, 1983
- Venue: Village West, NYC
- Genre: Jazz
- Label: Muse; MR 5317
- Producer: Helen Keane

Kenny Burrell chronology
Ellington a la Carte (1983)	A la Carte (1985)	Togethering (1984)

A la Carte is a live album by guitarist Kenny Burrell recorded in New York in 1983 and released on the Muse label until 1985.

Professional ratings
Review scores
Source	Rating
Allmusic	3/5 stars

== Track listing ==
1. "I've Never Been in Love Before" (Frank Loesser) – 6:38
2. "Dreamy" (Erroll Garner) – 7:00
3. "Our Love" (Larry Clinton, Buddy Bernier, Bob Emmerich) – 6:59
4. "St. Thomas" (Sonny Rollins) – 5:35
5. "Tenderly" (Walter Gross, Jack Lawrence) – 6:01
6. "I Thought About You" (Jimmy Van Heusen, Johnny Mercer) – 6:50
7. "A la Carte" (Kenny Burrell) – 4:05

== Personnel ==
- Kenny Burrell – guitar
- Rufus Reid – bass
