= Pieces of Blue and the Blues =

Live album by Kenny Burrell and the Jazz Guitar Band
- Released: 1988
- Recorded: October 24 & 25 1986
- Venue: Village Vanguard, NYC
- Genre: Jazz
- Length: 44:11
- Label: Blue Note; B1-90260
- Producer: Helen Keane

Kenny Burrell chronology
| Generation (1987) | Pieces of Blue and the Blues (1988) | Guiding Spirit (1989) |

Pieces of Blue and the Blues is a live album by guitarist Kenny Burrell and the Jazz Guitar Band recorded at the Village Vanguard in New York in 1986 and released on the relaunched Blue Note label in 1988.

== Reception ==
Professional ratings
Review scores
| Source | Rating |
|---|---|
| Allmusic | 3/5 stars |

The Allmusic review by Michael G. Nastos noted "On paper, Kenny Burrell's three-guitar band with Bobby Broom, Rodney Jones, and a bass/drums rhythm section looks pretty good. Though individually they all sound quite different, this meeting of the minds, recorded over two days in October of 1986 at the Village Vanguard, harnesses the sound of Jones to a certain degree, and lets Broom a little loose in his soulful groove tendency. All are quite competent and professional players who understand the subtleties and understated harmonic arena Burrell lives in, so things work quite well in terms of sharing the load. There's very little competition at stake, the guitarists rightfully trade space and phrases, and play few extended unison lines, so the listening is enhanced if you do pay attention ... It seems this one-shot effort could be looked at via a jaundiced, too-many-cooks-spoil-the-broth eye. The music is good, not particularly great or memorable, but certainly a credible effort, likely better heard at the venue on the nights in question".

== Track listing ==
1. "Confessing the Blues" (Jay McShann, Walter Brown) – 9:55
2. "Raincheck" (Billy Strayhorn) – 6:17
3. "Blue Days, Blue Dreams" (Rodney Jones) – 7:56
4. "Salty Papa" (Leonard Feather, Sammy Price) – 4:33
5. "Jeannine" (Duke Pearson) – 5:12
6. "'Round Midnight" (Thelonious Monk, Cootie Williams, Bernie Hanighen) – 6:36
7. "No Hype Blues" (Bobby Broom) – 5:21

== Personnel ==
- Kenny Burrell – acoustic guitar, electric guitar, arranger
- Bobby Broom, Rodney Jones – guitar, electric guitar
- Dave Jackson – bass
- Kenny Washington – drums
