= Togethering =

Studio album by Kenny Burrell and Grover Washington Jr.
- Released: 1985
- Recorded: April 5, 6 & 23, 1984
- Venue: Mastermind Studios, New York City
- Genre: Jazz
- Length: 39:13
- Label: Blue Note; BT 85106
- Producer: Helen Keane, Kenny Burrell, Grover Washington Jr.

Kenny Burrell chronology
A la Carte (1983)	Togethering (1985)	Generation (1986)

Grover Washington Jr. chronology
Inside Moves (1984)	Togethering (1985)	A House Full of Love (1986)

Togethering is a 1985 jazz album by guitarist Kenny Burrell and saxophonist Grover Washington Jr., released on the relaunched Blue Note label.

== Reception ==
Professional ratings
Review scores
Source	Rating
Allmusic	3.5/5 stars
The Penguin Guide to Jazz Recordings	3/4 stars

The Allmusic review by Michael G. Nastos called it "a most satisfying session, with few -- if any -- commercial concessions" and noted "If any purist mainstream jazz listeners ever had problems with these musicians going for a buck by putting more R&B into their music, all is forgiven with the issuance of this marvelous album, which is more of a showcase for their true colors and collective musicianship beyond their commercialized efforts. Burrell and Washington proved to be a fine pairing -- a subtle, effective jazz partnership". A reviewer of Dusty Groove noted "Grover Washington Jr on Blue Note – but sounding really great here in the company of guitarist Kenny Burrell – very much back to the more basic reed work of his roots, and away from some of the smoother settings of his bigger dates from a few years before! Kenny's well-crafted guitar lines really direct the set – spinning out with energy and soul, and shaping the sound in tones that work especially well with Washington's soprano sax lines".

== Track listing ==
All compositions by Kenny Burrell except where noted

1. "Soulero" (Richard Evans) – 4:36
2. "Sails of Your Soul" (Grover Washington, Jr.) – 5:23
3. "Day Dream" (Duke Ellington, Billy Strayhorn, John La Touche) – 5:01
4. "A Beautiful Friendship" (Donald Kahn, Stanley Styne) – 5:04
5. "Togethering" – 4:36
6. "Romance Dance" – 3:28
7. "Asphalt Canyon Blues" – 6:19
8. "What Am I Here For?" (Ellington, Frankie Laine) – 4:46

== Personnel ==
- Kenny Burrell – acoustic guitar, electric guitar
- Grover Washington Jr. – soprano saxophone, tenor saxophone
- Ron Carter – bass
- Jack DeJohnette – drums
- Ralph MacDonald – percussion (tracks 2 & 6)
