= Sky Street =

Studio album by Kenny Burrell
- Released: 1976
- Recorded: June 18–20, 1974
- Studio: Fantasy Studios, Berkeley, California
- Genre: Jazz
- Length: 35:43
- Label: Fantasy; F-9514
- Producer: Kenny Burrell

Kenny Burrell chronology
| Stormy Monday (1974) | Sky Street (1976) | Ellington Is Forever (1975) |

Sky Street is an album by guitarist Kenny Burrell recorded in 1975 and released on the Fantasy Records label in 1976. The album was released on CD combined with Stormy Monday (Fantasy, 1978) as Stormy Monday Blues in 2001.

== Reception ==
Professional ratings
Review scores
| Source | Rating |
|---|---|
| Allmusic | 4/5 stars |
| The Rolling Stone Jazz Record Guide | 3/5 stars |

AllMusic awarded the album four stars, stating "This is the type of jazz that crossed over onto albums by rock bands like Steely Dan in the mid-'70s".

== Track listing ==
All compositions by Jerome Richardson except where noted.

1. "Three Thousand Miles Back Home" - 7:43
2. "Kim-Den Strut" - 10:15
3. "Habiba" (Kirk Lightsey) - 8:22
4. "Quiet Lady" (Thad Jones) - 7:23

== Personnel ==
- Kenny Burrell - guitar
- Jerome Richardson - tenor saxophone, soprano saxophone, flute
- Kirk Lightsey - piano, electric piano
- Stanley Gilbert - bass
- Eddie Marshall - drums
