= Ellington a la Carte =

Live album by Kenny Burrell
- Released: 1993
- Recorded: August 19–20, 1983
- Venue: Village West, NYC
- Genre: Jazz
- Length: 43:39
- Label: Muse; MCD 5435
- Producer: Helen Keane

Kenny Burrell chronology
Groovin' High (1981)	Ellington a la Carte (1993)	A la Carte (1983)

Ellington a la Carte is a live album by guitarist Kenny Burrell recorded in New York in 1983 but not released on the Muse label until 1993.

== Reception ==
Professional ratings
Review scores
Source	Rating
Allmusic	2.5/5 stars

The Allmusic review said "The playing is excellent and the interplay creative in a subtle way, but nothing out of the ordinary or particularly memorable occurs. However Kenny Burrell fans will enjoy this".

== Track listing ==
1. "Take the "A" Train" (Billy Strayhorn) – 4:20
2. "Sultry Serenade" (Tyree Glenn) – 6:49
3. "Flamingo" (Ted Grouya, Edmund Anderson) – 4:27
4. "In a Mellow Tone" (Duke Ellington, Milt Gabler) – 5:28
5. "Don't Worry 'Bout Me" (Rube Bloom, Ted Koehler) – 7:08
6. "Ellington Medley: Azure/I Ain't Got Nothin' but the Blues/Do Nothing till You Hear from Me/Mood Indigo" (Ellington, Irving Mills/Ellington, Don George/Ellington, Bob Russell/Ellington, Barney Bigard, Mills) – 11:20
7. "Blues for Duke" (Kenny Burrell) – 4:07

== Personnel ==
- Kenny Burrell – acoustic guitar, electric guitar
- Rufus Reid – bass
