= Sunup to Sundown =

Studio album by Kenny Burrell
- Released: 1991
- Recorded: June 10–12, 1991
- Studio: DK-USA, NYC
- Genre: Jazz
- Length: 55:51
- Label: Contemporary; CCD-14065-2
- Producer: Helen Keane

Kenny Burrell chronology
Guiding Spirit (1990)	Sunup to Sundown (1991)	Then Along Came Kenny (1993)

Sunup to Sundown is an album by guitarist Kenny Burrell that was released on the Contemporary label in 1991.

== Reception ==
Professional ratings
Review scores
Source	Rating
Allmusic	4/5 stars

The Allmusic review by Scott Yanow noted: "Guitarist Kenny Burrell has a strong all-around showcase on this release from Contemporary ... Burrell swings harder than he usually does when paying tribute to the past, coming up with fresh statements on the varied material ... This set serves as an excellent introduction to Kenny Burrell's enjoyable brand of straightahead playing."

The sleeve note is a letter from Tony Bennett to Burrell's manager Helen Keane (jazz) accompanied by one of Bennett's drawings of the band.

== Track listing ==
1. "Out There" (Llew Matthews) – 5:12
2. "Sunup to Sundown" (Norman Mapp) – 7:56
3. "Roni's Decision" (Cedar Walton) – 6:30
4. "I'm Old Fashioned" (Jerome Kern, Johnny Mercer) – 6:58
5. "Autumn Leaves" (Joseph Kosma, Jacques Prévert, Mercer) – 6:48
6. "Smile" (Charlie Chaplin, John Turner, Geoffrey Parsons) – 5:50
7. "Love Dance" (Ivan Lins, Vítor Martins, Paul Williams) – 5:22
8. "Speak Low" (Kurt Weill, Ogden Nash) – 6:05
9. "Lucky to Be Me" (Leonard Bernstein, Betty Comden, Adolph Green) – 5:10

== Personnel ==
- Kenny Burrell – acoustic guitar, electric guitar, arranger
- Cedar Walton – piano
- Rufus Reid – bass
- Lewis Nash – drums
