= Monster (Jimmy Smith album) =

Studio album by Jimmy Smith
- Released: 1965
- Recorded: January 19–20, 1965
- Studio: Van Gelder Studio, Englewood Cliffs, New Jersey
- Genre: Jazz
- Length: 39:19
- Label: Verve; V-8618
- Producer: Creed Taylor

Jimmy Smith chronology
Christmas '64 (1964)	Monster (1965)	Organ Grinder Swing (1965)

Singles from Monster
- 1. "Goldfinger (Part 1)" Released: February 1966

Monster is an album by American jazz organist Jimmy Smith arranged by Oliver Nelson.

On the Billboard albums chart, Monster peaked at number 35, and at 5 on the top R&B albums chart.

Writer Gerald Majer critiqued Monster in his 2013 book of essays, The Velvet Lounge: On Late Chicago Jazz.

== Reception ==
Professional ratings
Review scores
Source	Rating
AllMusic	2/5 stars

AllMusic awarded the album two stars and its review by Scott Yanow stated that:

"Due to the material, which includes the two-part "Goldfinger", and the themes from Bewitched, The Munsters and The Man with the Golden Arm, this is one of organist Jimmy Smith's lesser recordings. The LP does have some reasonably inventive arrangements for the accompanying big band by Oliver Nelson and some spirited organ playing, but overall is a rather forgettable and overproduced effort."

== Track listing ==
1. "Goldfinger (Part 1)" (Anthony Newley, John Barry, Leslie Bricusse) – 2:45
2. "Goldfinger (Part 2)" (Newley, Barry, Bricusse) – 2:45
3. "St. James Infirmary Blues" (Joe Primose) – 6:00
4. "Gloomy Sunday" (Rezső Seress, Sam M. Lewis) – 5:00
5. "Theme From Bewitched" (Howard Greenfield, Jack Keller) – 3:04
6. "Theme From The Munsters" (Jack Marshall) – 3:30
7. "Theme From The Man with the Golden Arm" (Elmer Bernstein) – 4:30
8. "The Creeper" (Oliver Nelson) – 5:30
9. "Monlope" (Jimmy Smith) – 6:15

== Personnel ==
=== Musicians ===
- Jimmy Smith – organ
- Oliver Nelson – arranger, conductor
- Richard Davis – double bass
- Grady Tate – drums
- Kenny Burrell – guitar
- Warren Smith – percussion
- Robert Ashton – saxophone
- Budd Johnson, Jerome Richardson, Phil Woods, Danny Banks, Raymond Beckenstein, George Dorsey, Harvey Estrin – wind instruments

=== Technical ===
- Creed Taylor – producer
- Rudy Van Gelder – engineer
- Val Valentin – director of engineering
- John Henry, Chuck Stewart – photography
- Johnny Magnus – liner notes

== Chart performance ==
=== Album ===
Chart (1965)	Peak position	Total weeks
U.S. Billboard 200	35	24
