= Organ Grinder =

Organ Grinder may refer to:

- Organ grinder, a street organ player

== Film and TV ==
- The Organ Grinder, a 1912 film short with Carlyle Blackwell, Alice Joyce and William H. West
- The Organ Grinder, a 1933 film by Looney Tunes and Merrie Melodies
- "Organ Grinder" (CSI), an episode of the TV series CSI
- "Organ Grinder" (Grimm), an episode of the TV series Grimm

== Music ==
- "Organ Grinder", a song by Gene Page from the 1976 album Lovelock!
- "Organ Grinder", a song by Emilie Autumn from the 2008 album 4 O'Clock

== Other ==
- Organ Grinder Restaurant, a former restaurant in Portland, Oregon

== See also ==
- Organ Grinder's Swing (disambiguation)
- All pages with a text containing Organ Grinder
