= Lotus Blossom (album) =

Studio album by Kenny Burrell
- Released: 1995
- Recorded: May 1995
- Label: Concord Jazz
- Producer: John Burk

Kenny Burrell chronology
No Problem (1994)	Lotus Blossom (1995)	Then Along Came Kenny (1996)

Lotus Blossom is an album by the American musician Kenny Burrell, released in 1995. Burrell supported the album by touring with the 1996 "Guitar Summit" package, with Jorma Kaukonen, Stanley Jordan, and Manuel Barrueco.

== Production ==
Recorded in May 1995, the album was produced by John Burk. Burrell used bassist Ray Drummond on the duo tracks, and Drummond and drummer Yoron Israel on the trio tracks; six of the tracks were performed solo. "Satin Doll" and "Warm Valley" are versions of the Duke Ellington compositions. The title track was written by Billy Strayhorn.

== Critical reception ==
Professional ratings
Review scores
Source	Rating
AllMusic	3/5 stars
The Encyclopedia of Popular Music	3/5 stars
Los Angeles Times	2.5/4 stars
MusicHound Jazz: The Essential Album Guide	4/5 stars
The Penguin Guide to Jazz on CD	3.5/4 stars

The Sun-Sentinel wrote that "Burrell's elegant phrasing exudes warmth and lyricism." The Los Angeles Times stated that "Burrell alternates rich harmonic statements with single string lines filled with arpeggiated phrasing spelling out the underlying chords."

Newsday concluded that, "for Burrell, Ellington's music isn't a hallowed museum, but a palpable, living presence, capable of sustaining intimate, rewarding dialogue." The Omaha World-Herald deemed the album "quiet, subtle music rendered in always creative fashion by a player who should be called Mr. Taste." The Daily Breeze listed Lotus Blossom among the best mainstream jazz albums of 1995.

AllMusic wrote that "although the tunes are superior, none of these versions are definitive and the mellow results rarely rise above the level of background music."

== Track listing ==
No.	Title	Length
1.	"Satin Doll"
2.	"Warm Valley"
3.	"There Will Never Be Another You"
4.	"Lotus Blossom"
5.	"If You Could See Me Now"
6.	"The Night Has a Thousand Eyes"
7.	"I Don't Stand a Ghost of a Chance"
8.	"Minha (All Mine)"
9.	"For Once In My Life"
10.	"Couplet: Once Upon a Summertime / When the World Was Young"
11.	"I'm Falling for You"
12.	"They Can't Take That Away from Me"
13.	"Old Folks"
