= Listen to the Dawn =

Studio album by Kenny Burrell
- Released: 1983
- Recorded: December 9–10, 1980
- Studio: Roxy Recording Studios, NYC
- Genre: Jazz
- Length: 35:20
- Label: Muse; MR 5264
- Producer: Helen Keane

Kenny Burrell chronology
Heritage (1980)	Listen to the Dawn (1983)	Groovin' High (1981)

Listen to the Dawn is an album by guitarist Kenny Burrell recorded in late 1980 and released on the Muse label in 1983.

== Reception ==
Professional ratings
Review scores
Source	Rating
Allmusic	2.5/5 stars

The Allmusic review called it a "Sharp trio set" and stated: "The results are uniformly solid, sometimes more emphatic than others. Burrell is still playing in a relaxed, easy groove, but occasionally increases the energy level".

== Track listing ==
All compositions by Kenny Burrell except where noted.

1. "Yours Is My Heart Alone" (Franz Lehar, Harry B. Smith) – 3:30
2. "My One and Only Love" (Guy Wood, Robert Mellin) – 6:14
3. "You're My Everything" (Harry Warren, Mort Dixon, Joe Young) – 6:27
4. "Listen to the Dawn" – 5:37
5. "Isabella" – 5:31
6. "It Amazes Me" (Cy Coleman, Carolyn Leigh) – 5:05
7. "Never Let Me Go" (Jay Livingston, Ray Evans) – 5:56
8. "Papa Joe" – 5:21

== Personnel ==
- Kenny Burrell – guitar
- Rufus Reid – bass
- Ben Riley – drums
