= Generation (Kenny Burrell album) =

Live album by Kenny Burrell and the Jazz Guitar Band
- Released: 1987
- Recorded: October 24 & 25 1986
- Venue: Village Vanguard, NYC
- Genre: Jazz
- Length: 67:21 CD release with additional tracks
- Label: Blue Note; BT 85137
- Producer: Helen Keane

Kenny Burrell chronology
Togethering (1985)	Generation (1987)	Pieces of Blue and the Blues (1988)

Generation is a live album by guitarist Kenny Burrell and the Jazz Guitar Band recorded at the Village Vanguard in New York in 1986 and released on the relaunched Blue Note label.

== Reception ==
Professional ratings
Review scores
Source	Rating
Allmusic	2.5/5 stars

The Allmusic review by Scott Yanow noted "On this set, Kenny Burrell teams up with a couple of younger players in what he calls his "Jazz Guitar Band." The only trouble is that it is next to impossible to tell Burrell apart from Rodney Jones or Bobby Broom; they all sound nearly alike. ... the result is some fine bop-oriented music, but little that is very memorable".

== Track listing ==
1. Announcements by Kenny Burrell – 0:51
2. "Generation" (Llew Matthews) – 6:59
3. "High Fly" (Randy Weston) – 8:51
4. "Jumpin' the Blues" (Jay McShann, Charlie Parker, Walter Brown) – 3:04
5. "Lover Man" (Jimmy Davis, Ram Ramirez, James Sherman) – 7:16
6. "Medley:"
  1. "Dolphin Dance" (Herbie Hancock) – 4:12 Additional track on CD release
  2. "Naima" (John Coltrane) – 2:43 Additional track on CD release
  3. "Star Crossed Lovers" (Duke Ellington, Billy Strayhorn) – 2:47 Additional track on CD release
  4. "Just Friends" (John Klenner, Sam M. Lewis) – 6:52 Additional track on CD release
7. "Mark I" (Kenny Burrell) – 11:00
8. "So Little Time" (Burrell) – 6:51
9. "Fungii Mama" (Blue Mitchell) – 6:11

== Personnel ==
- Kenny Burrell – acoustic guitar, electric guitar, arranger
- Bobby Broom, Rodney Jones – guitar, electric guitar
- Dave Jackson – bass
- Kenny Washington – drums
