= Groovin' High (Kenny Burrell album) =

Studio album by Kenny Burrell
- Released: 1984
- Recorded: July 14 & 15, 1981
- Studio: Roxy Recording Studios, NYC
- Genre: Jazz
- Label: Muse; MR 5281
- Producer: Helen Keane

Kenny Burrell chronology
Listen to the Dawn (1980)	Groovin' High (1984)	Ellington a la Carte (1983)

Groovin' High is an album by guitarist Kenny Burrell recorded in 1981 and released on the Muse label in 1984.

Professional ratings
Review scores
Source	Rating
Allmusic	2.5/5 stars

== Track listing ==
1. "Groovin' High" (Dizzy Gillespie) – 5:33
2. "Lament" (J. J. Johnson) – 6:17
3. "If I Love Again" (Ben Oakland, Jack Murray) – 3:52
4. "Spring Can Really Hang You Up the Most" (Tommy Wolf, Fran Landesman) – 3:29
5. "Secret Love" (Sammy Fain, Paul Francis Webster) – 6:48
6. "Peace" (Horace Silver) – 7:08
7. "Someone to Light Up My Life" (Antônio Carlos Jobim, Vinicius de Moraes, Gene Lees) – 4:54

== Personnel ==
- Kenny Burrell – guitar
- Larry Ridley – bass
- Ben Riley – drums
