= God Bless the Child (Kenny Burrell album) =

1971 album by Kenny Burrell

Studio album by Kenny Burrell
- Released: 1971
- Recorded: April 28 and May 11 & 25, 1971
- Studio: Van Gelder Studio, Englewood Cliffs, NJ
- Genre: Jazz
- Length: 49:52
- Label: CTI; CTI 6011
- Producer: Creed Taylor

Kenny Burrell chronology
Asphalt Canyon Suite (1969)	God Bless the Child (1971)	'Round Midnight (1972)

God Bless the Child is an album by American jazz guitarist Kenny Burrell featuring performances recorded in 1971 and released on the CTI label.

== Reception ==
The Allmusic review states "This is Burrell at his level best as a player to be sure, but also as a composer and as a bandleader. Magnificent".

Professional ratings
Review scores
Source	Rating
Allmusic	4/5 stars
The Penguin Guide to Jazz Recordings	3/4 stars

== Track listing ==
All compositions by Kenny Burrell except where noted

1. "Be Yourself" - 5:56
2. "Love Is the Answer" - 4:54
3. "Do What You Gotta Do" - 9:35
4. "A Child Is Born" (Thad Jones) - 8:37
5. "God Bless the Child" (Billie Holiday, Arthur Herzog, Jr.) - 8:55
6. "Ballad of the Sad Young Men" (Fran Landesman, Tommy Wolf) - 2:19
7. "Lost in the Stars" (Kurt Weill, Maxwell Anderson) - 2:27
8. "A Child Is Born" [alternate take] (Jones) - 7:09

- Recorded at Van Gelder Studio in Englewood Cliffs, New Jersey on April 28 (tracks 1, 3, 5 & 8), May 11 (tracks 4 & 7) and May 25 (tracks 2 & 6), 1971

Tracks 6–8 are bonus tracks on CD issues, not on the original LP.

== Personnel ==
- Kenny Burrell - electric guitar
- Freddie Hubbard - trumpet (except tracks 6 & 7)
- Hubert Laws - flute (except tracks 6 & 7)
- Richard Wyands - piano, electric piano (except tracks 6 & 7)
- Hugh Lawson - electric piano (except tracks 6 & 7)
- Ron Carter - bass (except tracks 6 & 7)
- Billy Cobham - drums (except tracks 6 & 7)
- Ray Barretto, Airto Moreira - percussion (except tracks 6 & 7)
- Seymour Barab, Charles McCracken, George Ricci, Lucien Schmit, Alan Shulman - cello (except tracks 6 & 7)
- Don Sebesky - arranger, conductor
