= Ellington Is Forever Volume Two =

Studio album by Kenny Burrell
- Released: 1977
- Recorded: November & December 1975
- Studio: Fantasy Studios, Berkeley, California
- Genre: Jazz
- Length: 71:18
- Label: Fantasy; F-79008
- Producer: Kenny Burrell

Kenny Burrell chronology
Ellington Is Forever (1975)	Ellington Is Forever Volume Two (1977)	Prime: Live at the Downtown Room (1976)

Professional ratings
Review scores
Source	Rating
Allmusic	4.5/5 stars
The Rolling Stone Jazz Record Guide	4/5 stars

Ellington Is Forever Volume Two is an album by guitarist Kenny Burrell featuring compositions associated with Duke Ellington recorded in 1975 and released on the Fantasy Records label. Originally released as a double album set in 1977 it was rereleased on CD in 1994.

== Reception ==
Allmusic awarded the album 4½ stars stating "Burrell's initial plan was to release a volume in tribute to Ellington once a year, but this record and the one that preceded it were the only two albums in this proposed series that were ever made. One can only imagine what could have been if Burrell had continued. Alternately, and more positively, one can be glad that the only records that were released were as beautiful and as close to perfection as these two".

== Track listing ==
All compositions by Duke Ellington except as indicated

1. "Azure" (Duke Ellington, Irving Mills) – 1:50
2. "Take the "A" Train" (Billy Strayhorn) – 7:37
3. "In a Sentimental Mood" – 5:30
4. "I'm Beginning to See the Light" (Ellington, Don George, Johnny Hodges, Harry James) – 4:17
5. "Satin Doll" – 3:32
6. "I'm Just a Lucky So-and-So" – 5:37
7. "In a Mellow Tone" – 5:47
8. "Solitude" – 3:19
9. "The Jeep Is Jumpin'" (Ellington, Johnny Hodges) – 4:57
10. "I Let a Song Go Out of My Heart" – 6:56
11. "Prelude to a Kiss" – 2:55
12. "Satin Doll (Segue)" (Ellington, Strayhorn) – 0:21
13. "Come Sunday" – 3:10
14. "Just Squeeze Me (But Please Don't Tease Me)" – 8:01
15. "I Ain't Got Nothin' But the Blues" – 7:45
16. "Orson" – 3:36

== Personnel ==
- Kenny Burrell – guitar
- Nat Adderley – cornet
- Thad Jones, Snooky Young – trumpet
- Quentin Jackson – trombone, vocals
- Gary Bartz – alto saxophone, soprano saxophone, clarinet
- Joe Henderson – tenor saxophone
- Jerome Richardson – tenor saxophone, soprano saxophone
- Roland Hanna, Jimmy Jones – piano
- Jimmy Smith – organ
- Stanley Gilbert, Monk Montgomery, George Mraz – bass
- Philly Joe Jones (tracks 3, 4, 7, 9, 10, 15), Jimmie Smith (tracks 2, 5, 6, 8, 14) – drums
- Ernie Andrews – vocals
