= 'Round Midnight (Kenny Burrell album) =

Studio album by Kenny Burrell
- Released: 1972
- Recorded: 1972
- Studios: Fantasy Studios, Berkeley, California
- Genre: Jazz
- Labels: Fantasy; F-9417
- Producers: Harry Abraham, Kenny Burrell

Kenny Burrell chronology
God Bless the Child (1971)	'Round Midnight (1972)	Both Feet on the Ground (1973)

'Round Midnight is an album by guitarist Kenny Burrell recorded in 1972 and released on the Fantasy label.

== Reception ==
Professional ratings
Review scores
Source	Rating
Allmusic	2.5/5 stars
The Rolling Stone Jazz Record Guide	3/5 stars
The Penguin Guide to Jazz Recordings	2.5/4 stars

Allmusic awarded the album 2 1/2 stars with its review by Scott Yanow stating, "Although the music overall is well-played, no real sparks fly and the results often border on being sleepy".

== Track listing ==
1. "A Streetcar Named Desire" (Alex North) - 6:58
2. "Make Someone Happy" (Betty Comden, Adolph Green, Jule Styne) - 5:15
3. "'Round Midnight" (Thelonious Monk) - 5:09
4. "I Think It's Going to Rain Today" (Randy Newman) - 4:59
5. "Since I Fell for You" (Buddy Johnson) - 4:43
6. "I'm Gonna Laugh You Right out of My Life" (Cy Coleman, Joseph McCarthy) - 6:40
7. "Blues in the Night" (Harold Arlen, Johnny Mercer) - 3:32

== Personnel ==
- Kenny Burrell - guitar
- Joe Sample (track 3), Richard Wyands (tracks 1, 2 & 4–6) - piano
- Reggie Johnson - bass (tracks 1–6)
- Lennie McBrowne (tracks 1, 2 & 4–6), Paul Humphrey (track 3) - drums
