= Kenny Burrell Live at the Village Vanguard =

Live album by Kenny Burrell
- Released: 1980
- Recorded: December 15, 1978
- Venue: Village Vanguard, NYC
- Genre: Jazz
- Label: Muse; MR 5216
- Producer: Helen Keane

Kenny Burrell chronology
When Lights Are Low (1978)	Kenny Burrell Live at the Village Vanguard (1980)	Kenny Burrell in New York (1978)

Kenny Burrell Live at the Village Vanguard is a live album by guitarist Kenny Burrell recorded at the Village Vanguard in late 1978 and released on the Muse label. The album was rereleased on CD along with Kenny Burrell in New York as 12-15-78.

== Reception ==
Professional ratings
Review scores
Source	Rating
Allmusic	4/5 stars

The Allmusic review called it a "among the finest Burrell recorded in the '70s".

== Track listing ==
1. "Second Balcony Jump" (Billy Eckstine, Gerald Valentine) – 5:51
2. "Willow Weep for Me" (Ann Ronell) – 6:50
3. "Work Song" (Nat Adderley) – 4:25
4. "Woody 'n' You" (Dizzy Gillespie) – 7:31
5. The Introduction by Kenny Burrell of Max Gordon, Village Vanguard – 1:05
6. "In the Still of the Night" (Cole Porter) – 9:09
7. "Medley: Don't You Know I Care?/Love You Madly" (Duke Ellington) – 6:38
8. "It's Getting Dark" (Kenny Burrell) – 5:30

== Personnel ==
- Kenny Burrell – electric guitar
- Larry Gales – bass
- Sherman Ferguson – drums
