= Heritage (Kenny Burrell album) =

Studio album by Kenny Burrell
- Released: 1980
- Recorded: May 27 & 28, 1980
- Studio: Ocean Way Recording, Los Angeles, CA
- Genre: Jazz
- Length: 43:28
- Label: AudioSource; ASD-1
- Producer: Jeffrey Weber

Kenny Burrell chronology
Moon and Sand (1979)	Heritage (1980)	Listen to the Dawn (1983)

Heritage is an album by guitarist Kenny Burrell recorded in 1980 and originally released on the AudioSource label.

== Reception ==
Professional ratings
Review scores
Source	Rating
Allmusic	1.5/5 stars

The Allmusic review by Scott Yanow stated: "By 1980 it seemed as if guitarist Kenny Burrell was spending at least as much time looking backwards (paying tribute to the past greats) as he was creating new music. This out-of-print LP from the obscure AudioSource label features Burrell performing nine jazz standards ... A worthwhile if not particularly innovative set".

== Track listing ==
1. "A Night in Tunisia" (Dizzy Gillespie, Frank Paparelli) – 5:50
2. "Mood Indigo" (Duke Ellington, Barney Bigard, Irving Mills) – 4:02
3. "St. Louis Blues" (W. C. Handy) – 4:23
4. "'Round Midnight" (Thelonious Monk, Cootie Williams, Bernie Hanighen) – 6:11
5. "When the Saints Go Marching In" (Traditional) – 4:36
6. "Naima" (John Coltrane) – 5:24
7. "Struttin' with Some Barbecue" (Lil Hardin, Don Raye) – 4:12
8. "A Child Is Born" (Thad Jones) – 3:20
9. "Lush Life" (Billy Strayhorn) – 5:30

== Personnel ==
- Kenny Burrell – electric guitar, acoustic guitar
- Oscar Brashear (tracks 1, 4 & 5), Snooky Young (tracks 2, 3, 7 & 8) – trumpet
- Marshall Royal – alto saxophone, clarinet (tracks 2, 3, 6 & 7)
- Matt Catingub (track 1), Don Menza (tracks 4 & 5), Jerome Richardson (tracks 2, 3 & 9) – tenor saxophone
- Patrice Rushen (tracks 1, 4 & 5), Pete Jolly (tracks 2, 3, 6, 7 & 9) – piano
- Andy Simpkins – bass (tracks 1–7 & 9)
- Shelly Manne – drums (tracks 1–7 & 9)
- Moacir Santos – percussion (tracks 1, 4 & 5)
