= Ellington Is Forever =

Studio album by Kenny Burrell
- Released: 1975
- Recorded: February 4–5, 1975
- Studio: Fantasy Studios, Berkeley, California
- Genre: Jazz
- Length: 72:45
- Label: Fantasy; F-79005
- Producer: Kenny Burrell

Kenny Burrell chronology
Sky Street (1975)	Ellington Is Forever (1975)	Ellington Is Forever Volume Two (1975)

Professional ratings
Review scores
Source	Rating
Allmusic	4.5/5 stars
The Rolling Stone Jazz Record Guide	4/5 stars
The Penguin Guide to Jazz Recordings	4/4 stars

Ellington Is Forever is an album by guitarist Kenny Burrell featuring compositions associated with Duke Ellington recorded in 1975 and released on the Fantasy Records label. Originally released as a double album set in 1975 it was rereleased on CD in 1993 as Ellington Is Forever Volume 1.

== Reception ==
The album has been critically well received. The Penguin Guide to Jazz numbers it among the "core collection" which jazz fans should possess. Allmusic awarded the album 4½ stars stating "This is clearly an affectionate tribute, one born out of close association as well as great appreciation".

== Track listing ==
1. "Jump for Joy" (Duke Ellington, Sid Kuller, Paul Francis Webster) – 1:48
2. "Caravan" (Ellington, Irving Mills, Juan Tizol) – 8:38
3. "Chelsea Bridge" (Billy Strayhorn) – 4:37
4. "Mood Indigo" (Barney Bigard, Ellington, Mills) – 4:33
5. "Don't Get Around Much Anymore" (Ellington, Bob Russell) – 3:15
6. "C Jam Blues" (Bigard, Ellington) – 15:31
7. "It Don't Mean a Thing (If It Ain't Got That Swing)" (Ellington, Mills) – 9:34
8. "I Didn't Know About You" (Ellington, Russell) – 5:11
9. "My Little Brown Book" (Strayhorn) – 3:28
10. "Blues Medley: Carnegie Blues/Rocks in My Bed/Jeep's Blues/The Creole Love Call" (Ellington/Ellington/Ellington, Johnny Hodges/Ellington, Milt Jackson, Bubber Miley) – 10:26
11. "Do Nothin' Till You Hear from Me" (Ellington, Russell) – 2:53
12. "Take the "A" Train" (Strayhorn) – 2:57

== Personnel ==
- Kenny Burrell – guitar (tracks 1–8, 10 & 11)
- Thad Jones – cornet, flügelhorn
- Jon Faddis – trumpet, piccolo trumpet
- Snooky Young – trumpet
- Joe Henderson – tenor saxophone
- Jerome Richardson – tenor saxophone, soprano saxophone
- Jimmy Jones – piano (solo on "Take the 'A' Train")
- Jimmy Smith – organ
- Stanley Gilbert – bass
- Jimmie Smith – drums
- Richie Goldberg, Mel Lewis – percussion (track 2)
- Ernie Andrews – vocals (tracks 5 & 9)
