= Midnight Oil (Jerome Richardson album) =

Studio album by Jerome Richardson
- Released: 1959
- Recorded: October 10, 1958
- Studio: Van Gelder Studio, Englewood Cliffs, New Jersey
- Genre: Jazz
- Length: 35:23
- Label: New Jazz; NJLP 8205
- Producer: Esmond Edwards

Jerome Richardson chronology
Midnight Oil (1959)	Roamin' with Richardson (1959)

Midnight Oil is an album by saxophonist Jerome Richardson recorded in 1958 and released on the New Jazz label in 1959.

== Reception ==
Professional ratings
Review scores
Source	Rating
AllMusic	4.5/5 stars
The Penguin Guide to Jazz Recordings	3/4 stars

Scott Yanow of AllMusic states, "This set offers cool-toned bop that, although brief in playing time (just over 35 minutes), is enjoyable".

== Track listing ==
All compositions by Jerome Richardson except where noted

1. "Minorally" – 6:55
2. "Way In Blues" – 5:08
3. "Delerious [sic] Trimmings" – 5:17
4. "Caravan" (Juan Tizol, Duke Ellington, Irving Mills) – 10:45
5. "Lyric" (Artie Shaw) – 7:18

== Personnel ==
- Jerome Richardson – tenor saxophone, flute
- Jimmy Cleveland – trombone (tracks 1–4)
- Kenny Burrell – guitar
- Hank Jones – piano
- Joe Benjamin – bass
- Charlie Persip – drums
