= Guiding Spirit =

Live album by Kenny Burrell Quartet featuring Jay Hoggard
- Released: 1990
- Recorded: August 4 & 5, 1989
- Venue: Village Vanguard, NYC
- Genre: Jazz
- Length: 55:46 CD release with additional track
- Label: Contemporary; C-14058
- Producer: Helen Keane

Kenny Burrell chronology
Pieces of Blue and the Blues (1988)	Guiding Spirit (1990)	Sunup to Sundown (1991)

Guiding Spirit is a live album by guitarist Kenny Burrell's quartet featuring vibraphonist Jay Hoggard recorded at the Village Vanguard in New York in 1989 and released on the Contemporary label.

== Reception ==
Professional ratings
Review scores
Source	Rating
Allmusic	4/5 stars

In a review for Allmusic, critic Scott Yanow described the album as a successful "live at the Village Vanguard" recording, highlighting the effectiveness of the ensemble and characterizing it as a strong straightahead performance; he further regarded it as one of Kenny Burrell's more notable releases from that period.

== Track listing ==
1. "Calling You" (Bob Telson) – 9:10
2. "Main Stem" (Duke Ellington) – 6:04
3. "In a Sentimental Mood" (Ellington. Manny Kurtz, Irving Mills) – 4:50
4. "Moment's Notice" (John Coltrane) – 4:32
5. "Guiding Spirit" (Jay Hoggard) – 6:50
6. "Soul Eyes" (Mal Waldron) – 7:48
7. "Midnight Blue" (Kenny Burrell) – 4:39
8. "In Walked Bud" (Thelonious Monk) – 4:22
9. "Gift for You" (Yoron Israel) – 7:31 Additional track on CD release

== Personnel ==
- Kenny Burrell – guitar, arranger
- Jay Hoggard – vibraphone, arranger
- Marcus McLaurine – bass
- Yoron Israel – drums, arranger
