= Moon and Sand =

1979 Kenney Burrell album

Studio album by Kenny Burrell
- Released: 1979
- Recorded: December 1979
- Studio: Coast Records
- Label: Concord

Kenny Burrell chronology
Kenny Burrell in New York (1981)	Moon and Sand (1979)	Heritage (1980)

Moon and Sand is an album recorded by Kenny Burrell at Coast Records in December 1979. The album was initially released on the Concord Jazz label. The record is considered unusual in Burrell's catalog for the amount of acoustic guitar playing he provided at these sessions.

== Track listing ==
No.	Title	Length
1.	"Moon and Sand" (William Engvick, Morty Palitz, Alec Wilder)	6:24
2.	"My Ship" (Ira Gershwin, Kurt Weill)	6:31
3.	"For Once in My Life" (Cy Coleman, Robert Wells)	4:17
4.	"U.M.M.G. (Upper Manhattan Medical Group)" (Billy Strayhorn)	2:56
5.	"Blue Bossa" (Kenny Dorham)	4:12
6.	"Stolen Moments" (Oliver Nelson)	7:54
7.	"Love for Sale" (Cole Porter)	3:49
8.	"Lost in the Stars" (Maxwell Anderson, Kurt Weill)	3:20

== Personnel ==
- Kenny Burrell - Electric and acoustic guitars.
- John Heard - Bass
- Roy McCurdy - Drums
- Kenneth Nash - Percussion
