= Roamin' with Richardson =

Studio album by Jerome Richardson
- Released: 1960
- Recorded: October 21, 1959
- Studio: Van Gelder Studio, Englewood Cliffs, New Jersey
- Genre: Jazz
- Length: 39:12
- Label: New Jazz; NJLP 8226
- Producer: Esmond Edwards

Jerome Richardson chronology
Midnight Oil (1958)	Roamin' with Richardson (1960)	Going to the Movies (1962)

Roamin' with Richardson is an album by saxophonist Jerome Richardson recorded in 1959 and released on the New Jazz label.

== Reception ==
Professional ratings
Review scores
Source	Rating
AllMusic	4/5 stars
The Penguin Guide to Jazz Recordings	3.5/4 stars

Scott Yanow of AllMusic states, "Richardson plays baritone on three songs (in a deep tone a little reminiscent of Pepper Adams and Leo Parker), two on tenor and one on flute ... in excellent form, swinging through three group originals, 'I Never Knew', 'Poinciana' and a strong version (on baritone) of Duke Ellington's 'Warm Valley'."

== Track listing ==
1. "Friar Tuck" (George Tucker) – 5:36
2. "Up at Teddy's Hill" (Jerome Richardson) – 6:20
3. "Warm Valley" (Duke Ellington) – 8:40
4. "Poinciana" (Nat Simon, Buddy Bernier) – 7:33
5. "I Never Knew" (Ted Fio Rito, Gus Kahn) – 6:38
6. "Candied Sweets" (Richard Wyands) – 4:25

== Personnel ==
- Jerome Richardson – tenor saxophone, baritone saxophone, flute
- Richard Wyands – piano
- George Tucker – bass
- Charlie Persip – drums
