= Up the Street, 'Round the Corner, Down the Block =

Studio album by Kenny Burrell
- Released: 1974
- Recorded: January–February 1974
- Studio: Village Recorders, Los Angeles, California and Fantasy Studios, Berkeley, California
- Genre: Jazz
- Label: Fantasy; F-9458
- Producer: Kenny Burrell

Kenny Burrell chronology
Both Feet on the Ground (1973)	Up the Street, 'Round the Corner, Down the Block (1974)	Stormy Monday (1974)

Up the Street, 'Round the Corner, Down the Block is an album by guitarist Kenny Burrell recorded in 1974 and released on the Fantasy Records label.

== Reception ==
Professional ratings
Review scores
Source	Rating
Allmusic	4.5/5 stars
The Rolling Stone Jazz Record Guide	3/5 stars

Allmusic awarded the album 4½ stars.

== Track listing ==
All compositions by Kenny Burrell except as indicated

1. "Up the Street, 'Round the Corner, Down the Block" (Onaje Allan Gumbs) - 7:18
2. "Afro Blue" (Mongo Santamaría) - 5:40
3. "Sausalito Nights" - 7:15
4. "Juice" (Gumbs) - 5:40
5. "A Little Walking Music" - 3:18
6. "Soulero" (Richard Evans) - 9:13
- Recorded at Village Recorders in Los Angeles, California in January 1974 (tracks 2 & 4) and at Fantasy Studios, Berkeley, California in February 1974 (tracks 1, 3, 5 & 6)

== Personnel ==
- Kenny Burrell - guitar, whistling (track 5)
- Jerome Richardson - flute, soprano saxophone, tenor saxophone
- Richard Wyands - piano, electric piano
- Andy Simpkins - bass
- Lenny McBrowne - drums
- Mayuto Correa - percussion
