= Tin Tin Deo (album) =

Studio album by Kenny Burrell
- Released: 1977
- Recorded: March 23–25, 1977
- Studio: Coast Recorders, San Francisco, CA
- Genre: Jazz
- Length: 39:18
- Label: Concord Jazz; CJ-45
- Producer: Carl Jefferson

Kenny Burrell chronology
Prime: Live at the Downtown Room (1976)	Tin Tin Deo (1977)	Handcrafted (1978)

Tin Tin Deo is an album by guitarist Kenny Burrell recorded in 1977 and released on the Concord Jazz label.

== Reception ==
Professional ratings
Review scores
Source	Rating
Allmusic	2.5/5 stars

Allmusic awarded the album 2½ stars with Scott Yanow stating "Tin Tin Deo is a typically tasteful set by guitarist Kenny Burrell. ... Nothing particularly surprising occurs but Burrell is heard throughout in above-average form and this release should please his fans".

== Track listing ==
1. "Tin Tin Deo" (Chano Pozo, Gil Fuller) – 7:17
2. "Old Folks" (Willard Robison, Dedette Lee Hill) – 4:35
3. "Have You Met Miss Jones?" (Richard Rodgers, Lorenz Hart) – 2:53
4. "I Remember You" (Victor Schertzinger, Johnny Mercer) – 5:44
5. "Common Ground" (Kenny Burrell, Warren Stephens) – 4:22
6. "If You Could See Me Now" (Tadd Dameron, Carl Sigman) – 6:18
7. "I Hadn't Anyone 'til You" (Ray Noble) – 3:52
8. "La Petite Mambo" (Erroll Garner) – 4:17

== Personnel ==
- Kenny Burrell – guitar
- Reggie Johnson – bass
- Carl Burnett – drums
