= The Tender Gender =

Studio album by Kenny Burrell
- Released: 1966
- Recorded: April 4 & 5, 1966; RCA Recording Studio, New York City
- Genre: Jazz
- Length: 39:47
- Label: Cadet; LPS 772
- Producer: Esmond Edwards

Kenny Burrell chronology
Guitar Forms (1965)	The Tender Gender (1966)	Have Yourself a Soulful Little Christmas (1966)

The Tender Gender is an album by guitarist Kenny Burrell recorded in 1966 and released on the Cadet label.

== Chart performance ==
The album debuted on Billboard magazine's Top LP's chart in the issue dated December 17, 1966, peaking at No. 146 during a two-week run on the chart.

== Reception ==
Professional ratings
Review scores
Source	Rating
Allmusic	3/5 stars

Allmusic awarded the album 3 stars.

== Track listing ==
All compositions by Kenny Burrell except as indicated

1. "Mother-In-Law" - 4:38
2. "Hot Bossa" - 4:33
3. "People" (Bob Merrill, Jule Styne) - 2:41
4. "Isabella" - 4:55
5. "Girl Talk" (Neal Hefti, Bobby Troup) - 3:05
6. "Suzy" - 4:43
7. "The Tender Gender" - 4:49
8. "La Petite Mambo" (Erroll Garner) - 3:29
9. "If Someone Had Told Me" (Peter DeRose, Charles Tobias) - 3:09
10. "I'm Confessin' (That I Love You)" (Doc Daugherty, Al J. Neiburg, Ellis Reynolds) - 3:45

== Personnel ==
- Kenny Burrell - guitar
- Richard Wyands - piano
- Martin Rivera - bass
- Oliver Jackson - drums

== Charts ==
Chart (1966)	Peak position
US Billboard Top LPs	146
