= Night Song (Kenny Burrell album) =

Studio album by Kenny Burrell
- Released: 1969
- Recorded: April 14, 18 & 19, 1968 and January 6, 14 & 17, 1969; New York City
- Genre: Jazz
- Length: 39:37
- Label: Verve; V6-9246
- Producer: Esmond Edwards

Kenny Burrell chronology
Blues - The Common Ground (1968)	Night Song (1969)	Asphalt Canyon Suite (1969)

Professional ratings
Review scores
Source	Rating
Allmusic	3/5 stars

Night Song is an album by American guitarist Kenny Burrell recorded in 1968 and 1969 and released on the Verve Records label.

== Track listing ==
1. "Night Song" (Lee Adams, Charles Strouse) – 3:26
2. "Blues for Wes" (Kenny Burrell) – 4:21
3. "Namely You" (Gene de Paul, Johnny Mercer) – 3:38
4. "Love You Madly" (Duke Ellington) – 4:06
5. "Just A-Sittin' and A-Rockin'" (Ellington, Lee Gaines, Billy Strayhorn) – 3:58
6. "The Shadow of Your Smile" (Johnny Mandel, Paul Francis Webster) – 5:10
7. "Brother Where Are You Now" (Oscar Brown) – 2:48
8. "Night Hawk" (Burrell) – 8:07
9. "Teach Me Tonight" (Sammy Cahn, de Paul) – 4:03

== Personnel ==
- Kenny Burrell - guitar
- Bernie Glow (tracks 1 & 4), Joe Shepley (tracks 1 & 4), Marvin Stamm (tracks 1, 4, 7 & 9) - trumpet
- Wayne Andre (tracks 1 & 4), Jimmy Cleveland (tracks 1 & 4), Urbie Green (tracks 1 & 4), Alan Raph (tracks 1, 4, 7 & 9), J. J. Johnson (tracks 7 & 9), Tom Mitchell (tracks 7 & 9), Jay Sherman (tracks 7 & 9) - trombone
- Don Butterfield (tracks 1 & 4) - tuba
- Jerome Richardson (tracks 1 & 4), Phil Bodner (tracks 7 & 9) - flute, piccolo
- Warren Bernhardt (tracks 1 & 4), Hank Jones (tracks 7 & 9), Richard Wyands (tracks 2, 3, 6 & 8) - piano
- Ron Carter - bass
- Donald McDonald (tracks 1 & 4), Billy Cobham (tracks 7 & 9), Freddie Waits (tracks 2, 3, 6 & 8) - drums
- Johnny Pacheco (tracks 1 & 4), Jack Jennings (tracks 7 & 9) - percussion
- Don Sebesky - arranger (tracks 1, 4, 7 & 9)
