= Trane Whistle =

Studio album by Eddie "Lockjaw" Davis Big Band
- Released: 1960
- Recorded: September 20, 1960
- Studio: Van Gelder Studio, Englewood Cliffs, NJ
- Genre: Jazz
- Length: 31:53
- Label: Prestige; PR 7206
- Producer: Esmond Edwards

Eddie "Lockjaw" Davis chronology
Battle Stations (1960)	Trane Whistle (1960)	Tough Tenors (1960)

Trane Whistle is an album by saxophonist Eddie "Lockjaw" Davis' Big Band with arrangements by Oliver Nelson and Ernie Wilkins recorded in 1960 and released on the Prestige label.

== Reception ==
Professional ratings
Review scores
Source	Rating
Allmusic	4.5/5 stars
Down Beat	3/5 stars
The Penguin Guide to Jazz Recordings	3.5/4 stars

The Allmusic reviewer Scott Yanow stated: "Most significant is the inclusion of the original version of "Stolen Moments" (here called "The Stolen Moment" and predating the more famous Oliver Nelson recording by several months)".

In his February 1, 1962 review for DownBeat magazine Richard B. Hadlock wrote: "Perhaps the most significant aspect of this set is saxophonist Nelson's debut as a big-band arranger on four tracks."

== Track listing ==
All compositions and arrangements by Oliver Nelson except as indicated

1. "Trane Whistle" – 6:19
2. "Whole Nelson" – 3:35
3. "You Are Too Beautiful" (Lorenz Hart, Richard Rodgers) – 5:11 (arr. by Ernie Wilkins)
4. "The Stolen Moment" – 7:54
5. "Walk Away" – 5:27
6. "Jaws" (Eddie "Lockjaw" Davis) – 4:36 (arr. by Ernie Wilkins)

== Personnel ==
- Eddie "Lockjaw" Davis – tenor saxophone
- Clark Terry, Richard Williams, Bob Bryant – trumpet
- Melba Liston, Jimmy Cleveland – trombone
- Jerome Richardson, George Barrow – tenor saxophone, flute
- Eric Dolphy, Oliver Nelson – alto saxophone
- Bob Ashton – baritone saxophone
- Richard Wyands – piano
- Wendell Marshall – bass
- Roy Haynes – drums
- Oliver Nelson (tracks 1, 2, 4 & 5), Ernie Wilkins (tracks 3 & 6) – arranger
