= Both Feet on the Ground =

Studio album by Kenny Burrell
- Released: 1973
- Recorded: February 15, 18 & 19, 1973
- Studio: Village Recorders, Los Angeles, California
- Genre: Jazz
- Length: 39:54
- Label: Fantasy; F-9427
- Producer: Kenny Burrell

Kenny Burrell chronology
'Round Midnight (1972)	Both Feet on the Ground (1973)	Up the Street, 'Round the Corner, Down the Block (1974)

Both Feet on the Ground is an album by guitarist Kenny Burrell recorded in 1973 and released on the Fantasy Records label.

== Reception ==
Professional ratings
Review scores
Source	Rating
Allmusic	4.5/5 stars
The Rolling Stone Jazz Record Guide	3/5 stars

Allmusic awarded the album 4½ stars.

== Track listing ==
All compositions by Kenny Burrell except as indicated

1. "Naña" (Moacir Santos, Mario Telles, Yanna Kotti) - 6:18
2. "All Mine (Minha)" (Francis Hime, Ray Evans, Jay Livingston) - 6:24
3. "Tomorrow" (Benny Golson) - 6:33
4. "Spin" (Mike Wofford) - 4:48
5. "Good Morning Heartache" (Ervin Drake, Dan Fisher, Irene Higginbotham) - 4:57
6. "Listen to the Dawn" - 4:25
7. "Both Feet on the Ground" - 6:29

== Personnel ==
- Kenny Burrell - guitar, arranger (track 5)
- Al Aarons (tracks 1–4 & 7), Oscar Brashear (track 6) - trumpet, flügelhorn
- Maurice Spears - trombone (tracks 1–4, 6 & 7)
- Jerome Richardson (tracks 1–4 & 7), Ernie Watts (track 6) - clarinet, flute, piccolo, alto saxophone, tenor saxophone
- Jack Nimitz - clarinet, flute, bass flute, baritone saxophone (tracks 1–4, 6 & 7)
- Mike Wofford - piano, electric piano, arranger (track 4)
- Reggie Johnson - bass
- Lenny McBrowne - drums
- Moacir Santos - congas, percussion
- Benny Golson - arranger (tracks 1–3, 6 & 7)
