= Blues – The Common Ground =

Blues - The Common Ground

Studio album by Kenny Burrell
- Released: 1968
- Recorded: December 15, 1967 and February 12 & 19, 1968; New York City
- Genre: Jazz
- Length: 38:09
- Label: Verve; V6-8746
- Producer: Esmond Edwards

Kenny Burrell chronology
Ode to 52nd Street (1967)	Blues - The Common Ground (1968)	Night Song (1969)

Blues – The Common Ground is an album by American guitarist Kenny Burrell recorded in 1967 and 1968 and released on the Verve label.

== Chart performance ==
The album debuted on Billboard magazine's Top LP's chart in the issue dated August 31, 1968, peaking at No. 191 during a two-week run on the chart.

== Reception ==
Professional ratings
Review scores
Source	Rating
Allmusic	3/5 stars
The Penguin Guide to Jazz Recordings	3/4 stars

Allmusic awarded the album 3 stars with its review stating "Blues - The Common Ground finds Burrell backed by lots of brass and wind instruments for most of the album, hardly his usual setting. But his guitar successfully weaves in and out of songs... blending with the band and creating a pleasant balance".

== Track listing ==
1. "Everydays" (Stephen Stills) - 3:15
2. "Every Day (I Have the Blues)" (Peter Chatman) - 3:14
3. "The Preacher" (Horace Silver) - 2:54
4. "Angel Eyes" (Earl Brent, Matt Dennis) - 4:59
5. "The Common Ground" (Kenny Burrell, Warren Stephens) - 2:52
6. "Were You There" (Traditional) - 1:07
7. "Burning Spear" (Richard Evans) - 2:45
8. "Wonder Why" (Sammy Cahn, Nikolaus Brodszky) - 3:55
9. "Soulful Brothers" (Burrell, Stephens) - 5:31
10. "See See Rider" (Gertrude Rainey) - 3:25
11. "Sausalito Nights" (Burrell, Stephens) - 4:12

== Personnel ==
- Kenny Burrell - guitar
- Thad Jones (tracks 3–5 & 7), Jimmy Nottingham (tracks 3–5 & 7), Ernie Royal (tracks 3–5 & 7), Bernie Glow (tracks 1, 2 8 & 10), Jimmy Owens (tracks 1, 2, 8 & 10), Snooky Young (tracks 1, 2, 8 & 10) - trumpet
- Wayne Andre (tracks 1–5, 7, 8 & 10), Jimmy Cleveland (tracks 1–5, 7, 8 & 10), Urbie Green (tracks 3–5 & 7), Tony Studd (tracks 3–5 & 7), Paul Faulise (tracks 1, 2, 8 & 10), Bill Watrous (tracks 1, 2, 8 & 10) - trombone
- Harvey Phillips (tracks 3–5 & 7), Don Butterfield (tracks 1, 2, 8 & 10) - tuba
- Jerome Richardson - reeds (tracks 1–5, 7, 8 & 10)
- Herbie Hancock - piano
- Ron Carter - bass
- Grady Tate (tracks 3–7, 9 & 11), Donald McDonald (tracks 1, 2, 8 & 10) - drums
- Johnny Pacheco - percussion (tracks 1–5, 7, 8 & 10)
- Don Sebesky - arranger (tracks 1–5, 7, 8 & 10)

== Charts ==
Chart (1968)	Peak position
US Billboard Top LPs	191
