= Freedom (Kenny Burrell album) =

Studio album by Kenny Burrell
- Released: 1980
- Recorded: March 27, 1963 (#1–3); April 2, 1963 (#4); October 22, 1964 (#5–9)
- Studio: Van Gelder Studio, Englewood Cliffs, New Jersey
- Genre: Jazz
- Length: 36:24
- Label: Blue Note; GXF 3057
- Producer: Alfred Lion

Kenny Burrell chronology
| Soul Call (1964) | Freedom (1980) | Guitar Forms (1964) |

Alternative cover
- 2011 US vinyl

Freedom is an album by jazz guitarist Kenny Burrell. It was recorded at Van Gelder Studio in 1963–1964, and originally released in Japan by Blue Note Records.

AllMusic described it as "A funky blues set."

== Track listing ==
All compositions by Kenny Burrell except as indicated.

1. "The Good Life" - 2:33
2. "Stairway to the Stars" (Malneck, Parish, Signorelli) - 2:42
3. "Loie" - 3:01
4. "I Hadn't Anyone Till You" (Noble) - 2:44
5. "G Minor Bash" - 5:55
6. "Freedom" - 4:49
7. "Lonesome Road" - 5:15
8. "K Twist" - 4:41
9. "Love, Your Spell Is Everywhere" (Edmund Goulding) - 4:44

Recording dates: March 27, 1963 (#1–3), April 2, 1963 (#4), October 22, 1964 (#5–9)

== Personnel ==
Tracks 1–4

- Kenny Burrell - guitar
- Seldon Powell - tenor saxophone, baritone saxophone, flute
- Hank Jones - piano, organ
- Milt Hinton - bass
- Osie Johnson - drums

Tracks 5–9

- Kenny Burrell - guitar
- Stanley Turrentine - tenor saxophone
- Herbie Hancock - piano
- Ben Tucker - bass
- Bill English - drums
- Ray Barretto - congas
