= Have Yourself a Soulful Little Christmas =

Studio album by Kenny Burrell
- Released: 1966
- Recorded: October 1966
- Studio: Tel Mar Studios, Chicago
- Genre: Jazz
- Label: Cadet; LPS 798
- Producer: Esmond Edwards

Kenny Burrell chronology
The Tender Gender (1966)	Have Yourself a Soulful Little Christmas (1966)	A Generation Ago Today (1966-67)

Have Yourself a Soulful Little Christmas is an album of Christmas music by guitarist Kenny Burrell recorded in 1966 and released on the Cadet label. It peaked at #15 on Billboard's Best Bets For Christmas album chart on December 7, 1968.

== Reception ==
Professional ratings
Review scores
Source	Rating
Allmusic	4.5/5 stars
The Penguin Guide to Jazz Recordings	2/4 stars

Allmusic awarded the album 4½ stars in a review by Michael G. Nastos that stated "With pensive, meditative, precise playing, it's a must-have and features a definitive jazz hit version of "Little Drummer Boy".

== Track listing ==
1. "The Little Drummer Boy" (Katherine Davis, Henry Onorati, Harry Simeone) - 3:37
2. "Have Yourself a Merry Little Christmas" (Ralph Blane, Hugh Martin) - 3:27
3. "My Favorite Things" (Oscar Hammerstein II, Richard Rodgers) - 3:34
4. "Away in a Manger" (Traditional) - 3:06
5. "Mary's Little Boy Chile" (Jester Hairston) - 2:34
6. "White Christmas" (Irving Berlin) - 3:10
7. "God Rest Ye Merry Gentlemen" (Traditional) - 3:51
8. "The Christmas Song" (Mel Tormé, Robert Wells) - 3:05
9. "Children Go Where I Send Thee" (Traditional) - 3:08
10. "Silent Night" (Franz Gruber, Joseph Mohr) - 2:41
11. "The Twelve Days of Christmas" (Traditional) - 2:17
12. "Merry Christmas Baby" (Lou Baxter, Johnny Moore) - 3:22

== Personnel ==
- Kenny Burrell – guitar
- Richard Evans – arrangement
