= Asphalt Canyon Suite =

Studio album by Kenny Burrell
- Released: 1969
- Recorded: October 8, 10 & 16, 1969; New York City
- Genre: Jazz
- Label: Verve; V6-8773
- Producer: Kenny Burrell and Johnny Pate

Kenny Burrell chronology
| Night Song (1969) | Asphalt Canyon Suite (1969) | God Bless the Child (1971) |

Professional ratings
Review scores
| Source | Rating |
|---|---|
| Allmusic | 3/5 stars |

Asphalt Canyon Suite is a studio album by the jazz guitarist Kenny Burrell. It was recorded in 1969 and released on the Verve label.

== Track listing ==
All compositions by Kenny Burrell except as indicated

1. "Asphalt Canyon Suite Part 1: Introduction / Asphalt Canyon Blues" - 9:05
2. "Asphalt Canyon Suite Part 2: Think About It / Better Get Your Thing Together / Alone in the City" - 11:37
3. "Things Ain't What They Used to Be" (Mercer Ellington) - 3:15
4. "Put a Little Love in Your Heart" (Jackie DeShannon, Jimmy Holiday, Randy Myers) - 4:15
5. "Please Send Me Someone to Love" (Percy Mayfield) - 4:30
6. "Going to Jim and Andy's" - 3:00
7. "Sugar Hill" - 4:58

== Personnel ==
- Kenny Burrell - guitar
- Roland Hanna - piano
- Unidentified Orchestra arranged by Johnny Pate
