= Handcrafted (album) =

Studio album by Kenny Burrell
- Released: 1979
- Recorded: February 28 and March 1, 1978
- Studios: Dimensional Sound Studio, NYC
- Genre: Jazz
- Length: 35:20
- Labels: Muse; MR 5144
- Producer: Helen Keane

Kenny Burrell chronology
Tin Tin Deo (1977)	Handcrafted (1979)	When Lights Are Low (1978)

Handcrafted is an album by guitarist Kenny Burrell recorded in 1978 and released on the Muse label.

== Reception ==
Professional ratings
Review scores
Source	Rating
Allmusic	2.5/5 stars

The Allmusic review called it a "Steady, consistently swinging trio date with Burrell's fine guitar playing as the focus" and stated: "There's nothing exceptional here, but the breezy pace and bluesy feel are nice".

== Track listing ==
1. "You and the Night and the Music" (Arthur Schwartz, Howard Dietz) – 4:43
2. "So Little Time" (Kenny Burrell, Richard Evans) – 6:27
3. "I'm Glad There Is You" (Jimmy Dorsey, Paul Mertz) – 8:15
4. "All Blues" (Miles Davis) – 10:08
5. "It Could Happen to You" (Jimmy Van Heusen, Johnny Burke) – 5:47

== Personnel ==
- Kenny Burrell – electric guitar (tracks 1, 3 & 4), acoustic guitar (tracks 2 & 5)
- Reggie Johnson – bass
- Sherman Ferguson – drums
