= Organ Grinder Swing =

Studio album by Jimmy Smith
- Released: 1965
- Recorded: June 14–15, 1965
- Studio: Van Gelder Studio, Englewood Cliffs
- Genre: Jazz
- Length: 36:41
- Label: Verve
- Producer: Creed Taylor

Jimmy Smith chronology
Monster (1965)	Organ Grinder Swing (1965)	Got My Mojo Workin' (1965)

Singles from Organ Grinder Swing
- 1. "Organ Grinder's Swing" Released: September 1965

Professional ratings
Review scores
Source	Rating
AllMusic	4/5 stars
The Encyclopedia of Popular Music	5/5 stars
The Rolling Stone Jazz Record Guide	3/5 stars

Organ Grinder Swing is a 1965 studio album by Jimmy Smith. It marked a return to the trio ensemble that Smith used on the Blue Note recordings earlier in his career.

== Reception ==
AllMusic's Scott Yanow stated:

This outing is a throwback to Smith's Blue Note sets (which had concluded two years earlier) and gives the organist the opportunity to stretch out on three blues and three standards. This release shows that, even with all of his commercial success during the period, Smith was always a masterful jazz player.

The album was the second highest-charting album of Smith's career, reaching a chart position of number 15 on the US Billboard 200 charts. It was on the charts for 31 weeks.

== Track listing ==
1. "Organ Grinder's Swing" (Will Hudson, Irving Mills, Mitchell Parish) – 2:16
2. "Oh No, Babe" (Jimmy Smith) – 9:02
3. "Blues for J" (Smith) – 5:19
4. "Greensleeves" (Traditional) – 8:54
5. "I'll Close My Eyes" (Buddy Kaye, Billy Reid) – 3:19
6. "Satin Doll" (Duke Ellington, Johnny Mercer, Billy Strayhorn) – 7:01

== Personnel ==
=== Musicians ===
- Jimmy Smith – organ
- Kenny Burrell – guitar
- Grady Tate – drums

=== Technical ===
- Creed Taylor – producer
- Rudy Van Gelder – engineer
- Val Valentin – director of engineering
- Chuck Stewart – photography
- Holmes Daddy-O Daylie – liner notes

== Chart performance ==
=== Album ===
Chart (1965)	Peak position	Total weeks
U.S. Billboard 200	15	31

=== Single ===
Year	Single	Chart	Position
1965	"Organ Grinder's Swing"	Billboard Hot 100	92
