= When Lights Are Low (Kenny Burrell album) =

Studio album by Kenny Burrell
- Released: 1979
- Recorded: September 1978
- Studio: Coast Recorders, San Francisco, CA
- Genre: Jazz
- Length: 39:50
- Label: Concord Jazz; CJ-83
- Producer: Frank Dorritie

Kenny Burrell chronology
Handcrafted (1978)	When Lights Are Low (1979)	Kenny Burrell Live at the Village Vanguard (1980)

When Lights Are Low is an album by American guitarist Kenny Burrell recorded in 1978 and released on the Concord Jazz label.

== Reception ==
Professional ratings
Review scores
Source	Rating
Allmusic	2.5/5 stars
The Penguin Guide to Jazz Recordings	2.5/4 stars

Allmusic awarded the album 2½ stars with Scott Yanow stating "This session is so relaxed and tasteful as to be rather dull. Guitarist Kenny Burrell seems so intent on every note being appropriate that the results are overly safe and predictable".

== Track listing ==
All compositions by Kenny Burrell except where noted

1. "When Lights Are Low" (Benny Carter, Spencer Williams) – 4:51
2. "Body and Soul" (Johnny Green, Edward Heyman, Frank Eyton, Robert Sour) – 6:25
3. "Li'l Darlin'" (Neal Hefti) – 5:28
4. "Blue Muse" – 5:15
5. "Ain't Misbehavin'" (Fats Waller, Harry Brooks, Andy Razaf) – 4:58
6. "It Shouldn't Happen to a Dream" (Duke Ellington, Don George, Johnny Hodges) – 6:25
7. "Blues for Basie" – 6:28

== Personnel ==
- Kenny Burrell – guitar
- Larry Gales – bass
- Carl Burnett – drums
