= Organ Grinder's Swing =

"Organ Grinder's Swing" is a song composed by Will Hudson, with lyrics credited to Mitchell Parish and Irving Mills (Mills was the publisher), published in 1936. It became associated with the Jimmie Lunceford orchestra. Hudson based the "Organ Grinder's Swing" on the nursery rhyme "I Love Coffee, I Love Tea".

== Recordings ==
Ella Fitzgerald recorded the song in November 1936 with her Savoy Eight, and recorded it for a second time with the Count Basie Orchestra for her last album with Basie, 1979's A Classy Pair. Other contemporary versions were recorded by Benny Goodman, Django Reinhardt and the Mills Brothers. It was also featured in a 1937 Popeye short Organ Grinder's Swing.

Organist Jimmy Smith recorded "Organ Grinder's Swing" on his 1965 album Organ Grinder Swing. Vibraphonist Milt Jackson recorded it again in 1976 live at the Kosei Nenkin, Tokyo, with Teddy Edwards, Cedar Walton, Ray Brown and Billy Higgins.

== In popular culture ==
In the 1935 film The Littlest Rebel, Shirley Temple and Bill "Bojangles" Robinson tap dance to the tune in order to get enough money for train fare to Washington, DC. Ina Ray Hutton and her Melodears performed it in a medley with "Stardust" in their 1937 short Swing Hutton Swing.
