= Will Hudson (songwriter) =

American songwriter

- Born: Arthur Murray Hainer; March 8, 1908; Grimsby, Ontario
- Died: July 16, 1981 (aged 73) Isle of Palms, South Carolina
- Genres: Popular music
- Occupations: Composer, arranger
- Years active: mid-1930s to mid-1950

Will Hudson (né Arthur Murray Hainer; March 8, 1908 – July 16, 1981) was a Canadian-born American composer, arranger, and big band leader who worked from the mid-1930s through the mid-1950s.

== Early years ==
Hudson was born in Grimsby, Ontario, March 8, 1908. Print-media biographies state that he was born in Barstow, California. However, Hudson's U.S. Naturalization application indicates otherwise. Grimsby, then of Lincoln County, the county of which, in 1970, became amalgamated into a county-like governmental body known as the Regional Municipality of Niagara. Hudson, with his parents, immigrated to the United States November 13, 1909 — at the age of 1 year, 8 months. He grew up in Detroit and graduated from Southeastern High School in June 1926. Hainer put together his first big band in Detroit in the early 1930s. Hudson became a United States citizen on April 14, 1941.

=== Name change ===
Biographical sources for Will Hudson (né Arthur Murray Hainer; March 8, 1908 Grimsby, Ontario – July 16, 1981 Isle of Palms, South Carolina) often incorrectly state that he was born in Barstow, California. He changed his name sometime between 1931 and 1933 — after his marriage to Eleanor Radtke (born 1912) in Detroit on August 15, 1931, and before his compositions were copyrighted under his new name.

=== Citizenship ===
According to a manifest by the U.S. Department of Labor, Hainer had moved from Canada to the United States on November 14, 1909, and remained in the U.S. until July 14, 1928, before moving back to Canada, to reside at 152 Dougall Ave, Windsor, Ontario, Canada. He lived at 1805 West Grand Blvd, Detroit. The manifest indicates that he moved out of Detroit on November 7, 1929.

== Career ==
Hudson joined ASCAP in 1934.

At some point during the early 1930s, Hudson became a staff arranger for Irving Mills, writing stock arrangements. Mills — notable in various roles in the development of swing and jazz — was as much a promoter of songwriters, arrangers, and big bands as he was a publisher. Mills was known to have included his name as co-author of works that he did not write, but published. This was a common method of including music promoters in royalties.

=== Bands ===
Hudson was a dance-band arranger, and co-leader with Eddie DeLange of the Hudson-DeLange Orchestra. Singers with the Hudson-DeLange Orchestra included Ruth Gaylor, in 1936; Mitchell Ayres (né Meyer Agress; 1910–1969), in 1937; Georgia Gibbs (formerly Fredda Gibson; née Frieda Lipschitz; 1919–2006); and Nan Wynn. When the Hudson-DeLange Orchestra was at the height of its popularity, around 1940, Hudson had to withdraw for health reasons.

Hudson led his own band, the Will Hudson Orchestra, from 1939 to about 1941. Singers included Kay Kenny; Elisse Cooper, who, in 1944 married saxophonist Joseph Gabriel "Gabe" Gelinas; Jayne Dover (née Jane Rappaport), while signing with Van Alexander Orchestra; and Ruth Gaylor.

Eddie DeLange co-led with Hudson the Hudson DeLange Orchestra and wrote the lyrics to several songs composed by Hudson. Notable musicians involved with the band include George Siravo (also with the Will Hudson Orchestra; on the clarinet), Edward ("Doc") Goldberg (bass); Mitchell Ayres, Mitchell Parish (lyricist), Georgia Gibbs (vocalist), Nan Wynn (vocalist), and Gus Bivona (clarinet).

In 1941, Hudson began focusing on arranging, full-time.

=== World War II ===
Hudson enlisted in the U.S. Army March 6, 1943 (SSN 090 03 4600), and served in the U.S. Army Air Force. He became the arranger for the Glenn Miller Army Air Force Band. Hudson was discharged September 23, 1945.

=== Post-World War II ===
In 1948, Hudson enrolled at Juilliard, studying orchestration and composition with Wallingford Riegger, Henry Brant, and Vincent Persichetti — and earned a diploma in 1952 and post-grad diploma in 1953. He also studied composition privately.

His popular-music compositions include "Moonglow" (words Eddie DeLange; ©1934), "Tormented" (©1936), "Sophisticated Swing" (©1936), "Mr. Ghost Goes to Town" (©1937), "Devil's Kitchen" (©1935), "You're Not the Kind" (co-composed with Irving Mills; ©1936); and "Witch Doctor" (©1935).

== Selected discography ==
- "Wild Party" Vocals by Ina Ray Hutton. Recorded September 13, 1934, New York City. Vocalion / Brunswick BR 15915-1
- "You're Not The Kind of Girl for Me". Will Hudson & Irving Mills.
- "Cherokee" by the Ralph Burns Quintet. Recorded October 11, 1938, New York City. Ray Noble (music). Arranged by Will Hudson. B-23575 (matrix): Brunswick BR 8247. Ralph Burns (piano); Serge Chaloff (bari sax); Chuck Wayne (electric guitar); Artie Bernstein (bass); Don Lamond (drums)
- "Midnight in Manhattan" by Benny Mereoff.
- "I'd Love It" (© 1930) by McKinney's Cotton Pickers. By Don Redman & Will Hudson. Recorded November 5, 1929, New York City 57066-2 (matrix): Victor V-38133-B)
- "Then Someone's In Love" ("Alguien esta Enamorado") waltz by Max Prival (music) and Lew Pollack (words). Arranged by Will Hudson. Frank Martin (vocalist). Recorded in New York City, January 31, 1930. (matrix 58547-1: Victor Records V-38142-B)
- "Hot Water" by Cab Calloway. By Will Hudson. Recorded on December 7, 1932, New York City. 12696-A (matrix): Banner 32647 OCLC 78518408
- "Wild Party" (©1934) by Fletcher Henderson.
- "Hocus Pocus" (released 1934; music ©1935) by Fletcher Henderson. Recorded March 6, 1934, New York City. Bluebird B-10247-B
- "Jazznochracy" (©1934) by Jimmy Lunceford.
- "Organ Grinder's Swing" (©1936) by Jimmy Lunceford.
- "Remember When?" (w&m co-written with Eddie DeLange & Irving Mills; ©1934) by Jimmy Lunceford.
- "Ride, Red, Ride" (© 1930) by Mills Blue Rhythm Band. by Lucky Millinder & Irving Mills (w&m). Arranged by Will Hudson. CO-17759 (matrix): Columbia 3087-D

=== Hudson-DeLange Orchestra ===
By 1937, Hudson had composed 50 hits, including:

- "Moonglow" (words Eddie DeLange; ©1934),
- "Sophisticated Swing" (©1936),
- "Mr. Ghost Goes to Town" (©1937)
- "Jazznocracy" (©1934)
- "Devil's Kitchen" (©1935)
- "You're Not the Kind" (co-composed with Irving Mills; ©1936)
- "Witch Doctor" (©1935)
- "White Heat" (©1934)
- "Popcorn Man" (1936), co-composed with Louis Klein (1888–1945) & William "Bill" Livingston (1911–1989)
- "Tormented" (©1936)
- "Monopoly Swing" (©1936), and the band's theme song
- "Love Song of a Half-Wit" (1936)
- "Eight Bars In Search of a Melody" (©1936)
- "Hobo on Park Avenue" (©1936).
  Many of Hudson's compositions were published by Mills Music.
  The Hudson-Delange broadcast on Bandstand and recorded for Brunswick and Decca.
- "Tormented" (©1936)
- "With All My Heart and Soul" (©1934)
- "You're My Desire" (words, Hudson & Irving Mills, music Hudson; ©1937)
- "World Without You" (w&m Maria Kramer & Hudson; ©1940)
- "Start Jumpin'"
- "Three at a Table for Two"
- "Hi Ya Mr. Chips"
- "Peekin' at the Deacon"
- "On the Verge"

=== Recorded by Cab Calloway ===
- "Hotcha Razz-Ma-Tazz"
- "Just an Error in the News"
- "The Man From Harlem"
- "Moonglow"
- "Moonlight Rhapsody" (©1935)

=== Jazz compositions ===
- "Cowboy in Manhattan" (©1935)
- "Devil's Kitchen (©1935)"
OCLC 78518408

== Selected TV and filmography ==
"Moonglow"
2015: Legend
2013: 42
2011: Mildred Pierce (TV Mini-Series; Part 2)
2009: Amelia
2007: American Masters (TV Series documentary) (Les Paul: "Chasing Sound")
2007: Midnight Son (short)
2006: The Holiday
2006: Idlewild
2005: Carly Simon: A Moonlight Serenade on the Queen Mary 2 (Video)
2004: The Aviator
2004: Melinda and Melinda
2000: Center Stage
1999: Ben & Gunnar (sv) (TV movie) (uncredited)
1998: Frank Lloyd Wright (documentary)
1997: Private Parts
1995: Casino
1991: My Girl
1990: Alice
1990: Havana
1989: The Fabulous Baker Boys
1988: Stealing Home
1987: September
1986: Picnic (TV movie)
1984: Speed (documentary short)
1975: Inserts
1962: Perry Como's Kraft Music Hall (TV Series) (1 episode)

- Episode #14.29 (uncredited)

1961: The Twilight Zone (TV Series) (1 episode)

- "It's a Good Life"

1958: Jazz Party (TV Series)

- Episode #1.19

1958: Timex All-Star Jazz Show (TV Series)

- Episode dated April 30, 1958 (uncredited)

1956: Your Hit Parade (TV Series) (2 episodes)

- Episode dated June 9, 1956
- Episode dated June 2, 1956

1956: The Benny Goodman Story (Note: "Moonglow" — The slow swing number is based on the harmonies of Ellingston's "Lazy Rhapsody" (aka "Swanee Rhapsody") and was known mainly by Benny Goodman; He formed the basis for the title song of the film Picnic and 1956 used in the movie The Benny Goodman Story. (see. Bohländer 1989))
1955: Picnic (uncredited)
1941: Hi Gang! (uncredited)
1935: Fighting Stock (uncredited)

"You're Not the Kind of Boy for a Girl Like Me"
1955: Show Time at the Apollo (TV Series) (1 episode; "All Star Review")
1956: Basin Street Revue (uncredited)

"The Man From Harlem"
1989: Bloodhounds of Broadway

"Cowboy in Manhattan"
1936: Emil Coleman and His Orchestra (short) (uncredited)

"Jazznochracy"
1936: Jimmie Lunceford and His Dance Orchestra (short) (uncredited)

"Organ Grinder's Swing"
1997: One Night Stand
1985: That's Dancing!
1963: The Lawrence Welk Show (TV Series) (1 episode; episode #8.46)
1938: Sin-copation (short) (uncredited)
1937: Calling All Stars
1937: Swing, Hutton, Swing (short) (uncredited)
1937: Organ Grinder's Swing (short)
1935: The Littlest Rebel (Note: "Organ Grinder's Swing" became a hit after the 1935 American film The Littlest Rebel. In Germany, the song was recorded in March 1936 in Berlin by the Spree Revellers (de), a male vocal quartet, accompanied by the Hans Bund Dance Orchestra under the title "Hofkonzert im Hinterhaus" on the German label, Imperial 17111 (matrix K-C 9991 I) (BIEM) (audio on YouTube) The German lyrics were by Charles Amberg (de) (see Bohländer 1989))

== Selected copyrights ==
- "Jazznochracy" by Will Hudson. © February 20, 1934; EP40861 Exclusive Publications, Inc.
- "Moonglow" by Will Hudson, Eddie DeLange, Irving Mills. © May 10, 1934; EP42400 Exclusive Publications, Inc.
- "Glen Island Special" by Eddie DeLange, Will Hudson (arranger; for orchestra) © February 5, 1940; EP82794 Leo Feist, Inc.
