= Soul Call (Kenny Burrell album) =

Studio album by Kenny Burrell
- Released: 1964
- Recorded: April 7, 1964
- Studio: Van Gelder Studio, Englewood Cliffs, New Jersey
- Genre: Jazz
- Length: 36:33
- Label: Prestige; PRLP 7315
- Producer: Ozzie Cadena

Kenny Burrell chronology
Travelin' Light (1964)	Soul Call (1964)	Freedom (1963-64)

Soul Call is an album by guitarist Kenny Burrell recorded in 1964 and released on the Prestige label.

== Reception ==
Professional ratings
Review scores
Source	Rating
Allmusic	3/5 stars
The Rolling Stone Jazz Record Guide	3/5 stars
The Penguin Guide to Jazz Recordings	3/4 stars

Allmusic awarded the album 3 stars with the review by Scott Yanow stating, "The music is melodic and boppish, although no real surprises occur. By this time, Burrell was a very respectful player, upholding the tradition rather than offering any real innovations".

== Track listing ==
All compositions by Kenny Burrell except where noted

1. "I'm Just a Lucky So-and-So" (Mack David, Duke Ellington) - 5:15
2. "Mark One" (Will Davis) - 7:11
3. "A Sleepin' Bee" (Harold Arlen, Truman Capote) - 4:26
4. "Soul Call" - 7:22
5. "Kenny's Theme" - 5:00
6. "Here's That Rainy Day" (Johnny Burke, Jimmy Van Heusen) - 4:16
7. "Oh Henry" (Gil Fuller, Ernie Henry) - 3:03

Track 7 is a bonus track on CD issues, not on the original LP.

== Personnel ==
- Kenny Burrell – guitar
- Will Davis – piano
- Martin Rivera – bass
- Bill English – drums
- Ray Barretto – congas
