= Stormy Monday (Kenny Burrell album) =

Studio album by Kenny Burrell
- Released: 1978
- Recorded: June 18–20, 1974
- Studio: Fantasy Studios, Berkeley, California
- Genre: Jazz
- Label: Fantasy; F-9558
- Producer: Kenny Burrell

Kenny Burrell chronology
Up the Street, 'Round the Corner, Down the Block (1974)	Stormy Monday (1978)	Sky Street (1975)

Professional ratings
Review scores
Source	Rating
Allmusic	4/5 stars
The Rolling Stone Jazz Record Guide	2/5 stars

Stormy Monday is an album by guitarist Kenny Burrell recorded in 1974 and released on the Fantasy Records label in 1978. The album was released on CD combined with Sky Street (Fantasy, 1975) as Stormy Monday Blues in 2001.

== Reception ==
AllMusic awarded the album four stars, stating "this album shouldn't be missed".

== Track listing ==
1. "Call It Stormy Monday (But Tuesday Is Just as Bad)" (Aaron T-Bone Walker) - 5:40
2. "Azure Te (Paris Blues)" (Bill Davis, Don Wolf) - 6:58
3. "One for My Baby (And One More for the Road)" (Harold Arlen, Johnny Mercer) - 5:44
4. "(I'm Afraid) The Masquerade Is Over" (Herb Magidson, Allie Wrubel) - 6:00
5. "Why Do I Choose You?" (Hugh Martin) - 1:58
6. "I Got It Bad (and That Ain't Good)" (Duke Ellington, Paul Francis Webster) - 9:49

== Personnel ==
- Kenny Burrell - guitar
- Richard Wyands - piano (tracks 1–4 & 6)
- John Heard - bass (tracks 1–4 & 6)
- Lenny McBrowne (tracks 2, 3 & 6), Richie Goldberg (tracks 1 & 4) - drums
