= Jerome Richardson =

American jazz musician (1920–2000)

- Born: November 15, 1920; Sealey Texas, U.S.
- Died: June 23, 2000 (aged 79) Englewood, New Jersey, U.S.
- Genre: Jazz
- Instruments: Saxophone, flute

Jerome Richardson (November 15, 1920 – June 23, 2000) was an American jazz musician and woodwind player. He is cited as playing one of the earliest jazz flute recordings with his work on the 1949 Quincy Jones arranged song "Kingfish".

== Career ==
Starting from the age of eight, he first played alto saxophone, taking Johnny Hodges, Benny Carter and Willie Smith as models. Local band leaders Ben Watkins and Willy Baranco took interest in him and by the age of fourteen, he was playing professionally around northern California, later touring with Saunders King and having a brief engagement with the Jimmie Lunceford Orchestra. He took up the flute in 1940 and studied music at San Francisco State College. Enlisted in the navy, he worked under Marshal Royal in the 45-piece regimental band that was attached to the Navy's preflight training school for pilots at St. Mary's College in Moraga, California. After his discharge in 1945, he joined Lionel Hampton's band from 1949 to 1951, during which time he recorded on flute and took up the tenor sax. He started his own combo back in the San Francisco Bay area, in a group that included bassist George Morrow. He then joined Earl Hines`s small band on the road before moving to New York in 1954. There, he played with Oscar Pettiford`s group and at Minton's Playhouse, fronting his own group (with Hank Jones, Wendell Marshall and Shadow Wilson) and doing combo work with Kenny Burrell. He also worked at the Roxy Theatre (New York City) in their R&B productions.

Richardson was the regular saxophonist in the Oscar Pettiford band that one night, being busy with studio recording work, saw him late for the gig at Cafe Bohemia where Cannonball Adderley and brother Nat Adderley were present in the audience. Cannonball had taken his part and was inadvertently discovered as a result.

Richardson was versed in a variety of instruments in the saxophone, clarinet, and flute families. Early in his career he even sang rock and roll blues vocals. He was an in demand studio musician for television and stage, as well as a session musician in groups outside of jazz. He played with Quincy Jones, Lionel Hampton, Billy Eckstine, the Earl Hines small band, Oscar Pettiford, Charles Mingus, Kenny Burrell and The Thad Jones/Mel Lewis Orchestra (of which he was a founding member).

Richardson was born in Sealey, Texas but grew up in Oakland, California (through adopted parents), and died in Englewood, New Jersey, of heart failure at the age of 79.

== Discography ==
=== As leader ===
- Midnight Oil (New Jazz, 1959)
- Roamin' with Richardson (New Jazz, 1959)
- Going to the Movies (United Artists, 1962)
- Groove Merchant (Verve, 1967)
- Jazz Station Runaway (TCB, 1997)
- Groovin' High in Barcelona, with the Tete Montoliu Trio (Fresh Sound Records, 2021)

=== As sideman ===
- 1955: Oscar Pettiford: Another One (Bethlehem)
- 1955: Kenny Clarke: Bohemia After Dark (Savoy)
- 1955: Ernie Wilkins: Flutes & Reeds (Savoy) with Frank Wess
- 1955: Nat Adderley: That's Nat (Savoy)
- 1955: Sarah Vaughan: In the Land of Hi-Fi (Mercury)
- 1955: Hank Jones: Bluebird (Savoy)
- 1955: Jimmy Cleveland: Introducing Jimmy Cleveland and His All Stars (EmArcy)
- 1956: Cannonball Adderley: In the Land of Hi-Fi with Julian Cannonball Adderley
- 1956: Kenny Burrell: All Night Long (Prestige)
- 1956: Oscar Pettiford: The Oscar Pettiford Orchestra in Hi-Fi (ABC-Paramount)
- 1957: Quincy Jones: This Is How I Feel About Jazz (ABC-Paramount)
- 1957: Phineas Newborn, Jr.: Phineas Newborn, Jr. Plays Harold Arlen's Music from Jamaica (RCA Victor)
- 1957: Oscar Pettiford: The Oscar Pettiford Orchestra in Hi-Fi Volume Two (ABC-Paramount)
- 1957: The Three Playmates - The Three Playmates with George Barrow, Jerome Richardson, Budd Johnson, Sam Price, Kenny Burrell, Joe Benjamin, Bobby Donaldson, Ernie Wilkins (arranger) (Savoy Records, 1957)
- 1958: Gene Ammons: The Big Sound (Prestige), Groove Blues (Prestige)
- 1958: Eddie "Lockjaw" Davis: The Eddie "Lockjaw" Davis Cookbook (Prestige), The Eddie "Lockjaw" Davis Cookbook, Vol. 2 (Prestige), The Eddie "Lockjaw" Davis Cookbook Volume 3 (Prestige), Smokin' (Prestige)
- 1958: Betty Carter: I Can't Help It
- 1958: Abbey Lincoln: It's Magic (Riverside)
- 1958: Ray Brown: This Is Ray Brown
- 1958: Jimmy Cleveland: A Map of Jimmy Cleveland (Mercury)
- 1958: Helen Merrill: You've Got a Date with the Blues (MetroJazz)
- 1959: Tiny Grimes: Tiny in Swingville (Swingville)
- 1959: Jimmy Cleveland: Rhythm Crazy (EmArcy)
- 1959: Dinah Washington: What a Diff'rence a Day Makes!
- 1959: Joe Wilder: The Pretty Sound (Columbia)
- 1959: Ruth Brown: Miss Rhythm (Atlantic)
- 1959: Ahmed Abdul-Malik: East Meets West (RCA Victor)
- 1959: Quincy Jones: The Birth of a Band!, The Great Wide World of Quincy Jones (Mercury)
- 1959: Billy Taylor: Billy Taylor with Four Flutes (Riverside)
- 1959: Miles Davis: Porgy and Bess (Miles Davis album) (Columbia)
- 1960: Randy Weston: Uhuru Afrika (Roulette)
- 1960: Quincy Jones: I Dig Dancers (Mercury)
- 1960: Eddie "Lockjaw" Davis: Trane Whistle (Prestige)
- 1961: Benny Golson: Pop + Jazz = Swing (Audio Fidelity)
- 1961: Etta Jones: So Warm (Prestige)
- 1961: Billy Taylor: Kwamina (Mercury)
- 1961: Cannonball Adderley: African Waltz (Riverside)
- 1962: Junior Mance: The Soul of Hollywood (Jazzland)
- 1962: Blue Mitchell: A Sure Thing
- 1962: Milt Jackson: Big Bags
- 1962: Harry Belafonte: Midnight Special
- 1962: Quincy Jones: Big Band Bossa Nova
- 1962: Quincy Jones: The Quintessence
- 1962: Charles Mingus: The Complete Town Hall Concert (Blue Note)
- 1962: Etta Jones: Love Shout (Prestige), Hollar! (Prestige)
- 1963: Buddy Emmons: Steel Guitar Jazz (Mercury)
- 1963: Lalo Schifrin and Bob Brookmeyer: Samba Para Dos (Verve)
- 1963: Charles Mingus: Mingus Mingus Mingus Mingus Mingus (Impulse!)
- 1963: Charles Mingus: The Black Saint and the Sinner Lady (Impulse!)
- 1964: Lalo Schifrin: New Fantasy (Verve)
- 1964: Cal Tjader: Warm Wave (Verve)
- 1964: Quincy Jones: Quincy Jones Explores the Music of Henry Mancini, Golden Boy (Mercury)
- 1964: J. J. Johnson: J.J.! (RCA Victor)
- 1965: Milt Jackson: Ray Brown / Milt Jackson with Ray Brown (Verve)
- 1965: Quincy Jones: Quincy Plays for Pussycats (Mercury)
- 1965: Lalo Schifrin: Once a Thief and Other Themes (Verve)
- 1965: J. J. Johnson: Goodies (RCA Victor)
- 1965: Jimmy Smith: Monster (Verve)
- 1965: Sonny Stitt: Broadway Soul (Colpix)
- 1965: Shirley Scott: Latin Shadows (Impulse!)
- 1965: J. J. Johnson: Broadway Express (RCA Victor)
- 1966: Oliver Nelson: Oliver Nelson Plays Michelle (Impulse!)
- 1966: Cal Tjader: Soul Burst (Verve)
- 1966: Oliver Nelson: Happenings with Hank Jones (Impulse!)
- 1966: Shirley Scott: Roll 'Em: Shirley Scott Plays the Big Bands (Impulse!)
- 1966: Les McCann: Les McCann Plays the Hits (Limelight)
- 1966: Jimmy Smith: Got My Mojo Workin', Hoochie Coochie Man (Verve)
- 1966: Jimmy McGriff: The Big Band (Solid State)
- 1966: Manny Albam: The Soul of the City (Solid State)
- 1966: Chico Hamilton: The Further Adventures of El Chico (Impulse!)
- 1966: Oliver Nelson: Encyclopedia of Jazz (Verve)
- 1966: Oliver Nelson: The Sound of Feeling (Verve)
- 1966: Clark Terry: Mumbles (Mainstream)
- 1966: J. J. Johnson: The Total J.J. Johnson (RCA Victor)
- 1966: Johnny Hodges: Blue Notes (Verve)
- 1967: Johnny Hodges: Don't Sleep in the Subway (Verve)
- 1967: Sylvia Syms: For Once in My Life (Prestige)
- 1967: Jimmy McGriff: A Bag Full of Blues (Solid State)
- 1967: Kai Winding: Penny Lane & Time (Verve)
- 1967: Antônio Carlos Jobim: Wave (A&M/CTI)
- 1968: Stan Getz: What the World Needs Now: Stan Getz Plays Burt Bacharach and Hal David (Verve, 1968)
- 1968: Earl Coleman: Love Songs (Atlantic)
- 1968: David "Fathead" Newman: Bigger & Better (Atlantic)
- 1968: Stanley Turrentine: Always Something There
- 1968: Nat Adderley: You, Baby
- 1968: Kenny Burrell: Blues - The Common Ground (Verve)
- 1968: Sonny Stitt: Parallel-a-Stitt (Roulette)
- 1968: Nat Adderley: Calling Out Loud
- 1969: Dizzy Gillespie: It's My Way (Solid State)
- 1969: Sonny Stitt: Come Hither (Solid State)
- 1969: Walter Wanderley: Moondreams (A&M/CTI)
- 1969: Dizzy Gillespie: Cornucopia (Solid State)
- 1969: Kenny Burrell: Night Song (Verve)
- 1969: Roy Ayers: Daddy Bug (Atlantic)
- 1969: Milton Nascimento - Courage (A&M/CTI)
- 1969: George Benson - Tell It Like It Is (A&M/CTI)
- 1969: George Benson: The Other Side of Abbey Road (A&M/CTI)
- 1969: Quincy Jones - Walking In Space (A&M/CTI)
- 1969: Herbie Hancock: The Prisoner (Blue Note)
- 1969: Phil Woods: Round Trip (Verve)
- 1970: Mose Allison: Hello There, Universe (Atlantic)
- 1970: Quincy Jones: Gula Matari (A&M)
- 1970: Johnny Hodges: 3 Shades of Blue (Flying Dutchman)
- 1970: Leon Thomas: The Leon Thomas Album (Flying Dutchman)
- 1970: The Thad Jones / Mel Lewis Orchestra: Consummation
- 1970: Billy Butler: Yesterday, Today & Tomorrow (Prestige)
- 1971: Stanley Turrentine: Salt Song (CTI)
- 1971: Gene Ammons: Free Again (Prestige)
- 1971: Reuben Wilson: Set Us Free
- 1972: Quincy Jones: The Hot Rock OST (Prophesy)
- 1972: Steely Dan: Can't Buy a Thrill
- 1973: Steely Dan: Countdown To Ecstasy
- 1973: Lalo Schifrin: Enter the Dragon (soundtrack) (Warner Bros.)
- 1973: Kenny Burrell: Both Feet on the Ground (Fantasy)
- 1973: Bee Gees: Life in a Tin Can
- 1974: Kenny Burrell: Up the Street, 'Round the Corner, Down the Block (Fantasy)
- 1974: Moacir Santos: Saudade (Blue Note)
- 1974: Steely Dan: Pretzel Logic
- 1975: Kenny Burrell: Ellington Is Forever (Fantasy)
- 1975: Horace Silver: Silver 'n Brass (Blue Note)
- 1975: Oliver Nelson: Skull Session (RCA/Flying Dutchman), Stolen Moments (East Wind)
- 1975: Richard "Groove" Holmes: Six Million Dollar Man (RCA/Flying Dutchman)
- 1975: Moacir Santos: Carnival of the Spirits
- 1975: Kenny Burrell: Sky Street, Ellington Is Forever Volume Two (Fantasy)
- 1975: Gino Vannelli: Storm at Sunup (A&M)
- 1976: Bobby Bland, B. B. King - Bobby Bland and B. B. King Together Again...Live
- 1976: Wade Marcus: Metamorphosis
- 1976: Carmen McRae: Can't Hide Love
- 1976: Zoot Sims: Hawthorne Nights (Pablo)
- 1976: Milt Jackson: Feelings (Pablo)
- 1976: Lee Ritenour: First Course
- 1977: Dizzy Gillespie: Free Ride (Pablo)
- 1977: Benny Golson: Killer Joe (Columbia)
- 1977: Quincy Jones: Roots (A&M)
- 1979: The Crusaders: Street Life
- 1979: Earth, Wind & Fire: I Am
- 1980: Kenny Burrell: Heritage (AudioSource)
- 1981: Gerald Wilson: Lomelin (Discovery)
- 1990: Joey DeFrancesco: Where Were You? (Columbia)
- 1991: Clifford Jordan: Down Through the Years (Milestone)
- 1992: Jimmy Heath: Little Man Big Band (Verve)
