= Kenny Burrell =

American jazz guitarist (born 1931)

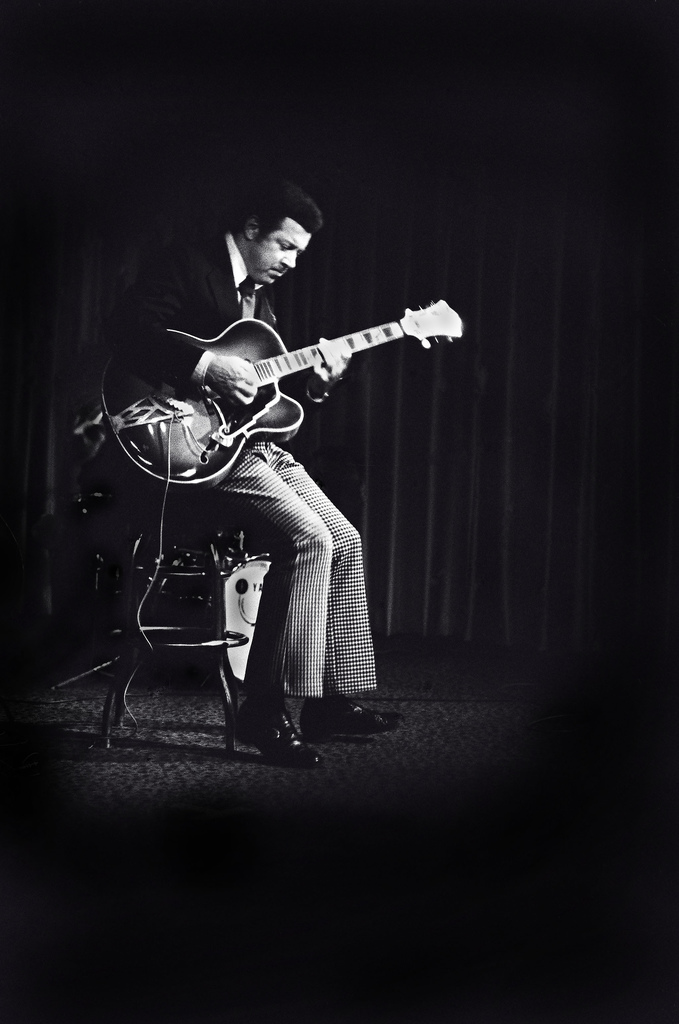
- Burrell in Buffalo, New York, 1977

Background information
- Born: Kenneth Earl Burrell; July 31, 1931 (age 95); Detroit, Michigan, U.S.
- Genres: Jazz, blues, soul jazz
- Occupations: Musician, jazz singer, composer, educator
- Instrument: Guitar
- Years active: 1951–2019
- Labels: Blue Note, Prestige, Verve, Fantasy, Fortune, Concord Jazz, Highnote

Kenneth Earl Burrell (born July 31, 1931) is an American jazz guitarist, singer and composer known for his work on numerous top jazz labels: Prestige, Blue Note, Verve, CTI, Muse, and Concord. His collaborations with Jimmy Smith were notable, and produced the 1965 Billboard Top Twenty hit Verve album Organ Grinder Swing. Burrell has cited jazz guitarists Charlie Christian, Oscar Moore, and Django Reinhardt as influences, along with blues guitarists T-Bone Walker and Muddy Waters.

Burrell is a professor and Director of Jazz Studies at the UCLA Herb Alpert School of Music.

== Early life ==
Burrell was born in Detroit in 1931, the youngest of six siblings. Three of his eldest sisters all died in childhood and his father, an auto mechanic, died when Burrell was only six years old. Both his parents played instruments, and he began playing guitar at the age of 12 after listening to Charlie Christian's recordings. During World War II, due to metal shortage, he abandoned the idea of becoming a saxophonist, and bought an acoustic guitar for $10. He was inspired to play jazz after listening to Oscar Moore, but it was Django Reinhardt who showed him "that you could get your own individuality on an instrument." He went on to study composition and theory with Louis Cabara and classical guitar with Joe Fava. While a student at Wayne State University, he made his recording debut as a member of Dizzy Gillespie's sextet in 1951, followed by the "Rose of Tangier"/"Ground Round" single recorded under his own name at Fortune Records in Detroit. While in college, Burrell founded the New World Music Society collective with fellow Detroit musicians Pepper Adams, Donald Byrd, Elvin Jones, and Yusef Lateef.

== Career ==
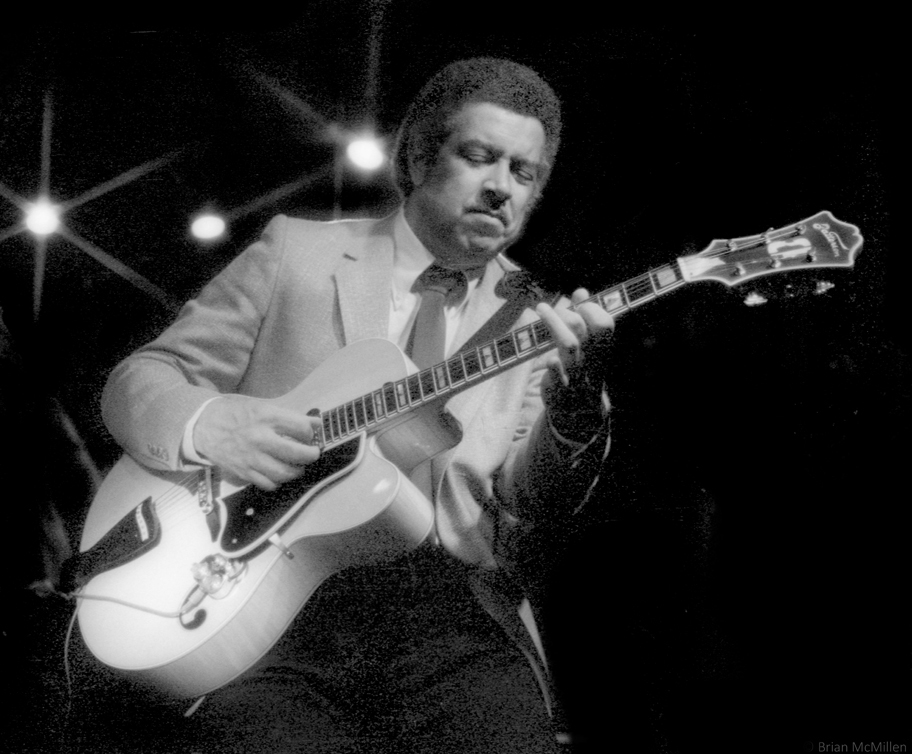
Burrell in San Francisco, California, March 8, 1984

Burrell toured with Oscar Peterson after graduating in 1955 and then moved to New York City in 1956 with pianist Tommy Flanagan. Within months, Burrell had recorded his first album as leader for Blue Note and both he and Flanagan were sought after as sidemen and studio musicians, performing with singers Tony Bennett and Lena Horne and recording with Billie Holiday, Jimmy Smith, Gene Ammons, and Kenny Dorham, among others. From 1957 to 1959, Burrell occupied the former chair of Charlie Christian in Benny Goodman's band. Since his New York debut Burrell has had a prolific recording career, and critics have cited The Cats with John Coltrane in 1957, Midnight Blue with Stanley Turrentine in 1963, and Guitar Forms with arranger Gil Evans in 1965 as particular highlights.

In 1978, he began teaching a course at UCLA called "Ellingtonia," examining the life and accomplishments of Duke Ellington. Although the two never collaborated directly, Ellington called Burrell his "favorite guitar player," and Burrell has recorded a number of tributes to and interpretations of Ellington's works. Since 1996, Burrell has served as Director of Jazz Studies at UCLA, mentoring such notable alumni as Gretchen Parlato and Kamasi Washington.

== Awards and honors ==
Burrell wrote, arranged, and performed on the 1998 Grammy Award-winning album Dear Ella by Dee Dee Bridgewater, received the 2004 Jazz Educator of the Year Award from Down Beat, and was named a 2005 NEA Jazz Master.

Burrell was a Grammy Salute To Jazz Honoree in 2010. The Grammy website states that between "...1956 and 2006, Mr. Burrell has excelled as a leader, co-leader and sideman releasing recordings with stellar musicians in the world of jazz."

== Personal life ==
Early on in his career, Kenny Burrell's first wife was Dolores with whom he had two daughters.

== Discography ==
=== As leader ===
- Introducing Kenny Burrell (Blue Note, 1956)
- Kenny Burrell (Blue Note, 1957)
- All Night Long (Prestige, 1957)
- All Day Long (Prestige, 1957)
- Earthy (Prestige, 1957)
- Kenny Burrell (Prestige, 1957)
- 2 Guitars with Jimmy Raney (Prestige, 1957)
- Blue Lights Vol. 1 (Blue Note, 1958)
- On View at the Five Spot Cafe with Art Blakey (Blue Note, 1960)
- A Night at the Vanguard (Argo, 1960)
- Weaver of Dreams (Columbia, 1961)
- Blue Lights Vol. 2 (Blue Note, 1961)
- Kenny Burrell & John Coltrane (New Jazz, 1962)
- Blue Bash! with Jimmy Smith (Verve, 1963)
- Bluesy Burrell (Moodsville, 1963)
- Lotsa Bossa Nova! (Kapp, 1963)
- Midnight Blue (Blue Note, 1963)
- Crash! (Prestige, 1964)
- Soul Call (Prestige, 1964)
- Guitar Soul with Bill Jennings & Tiny Grimes (Status, 1965)
- Guitar Forms (Verve, 1965)
- The Tender Gender (Cadet, 1966)
- Have Yourself a Soulful Little Christmas (Cadet, 1966)
- Man at Work (Cadet, 1966) – reissue of A Night at the Vanguard
- Ode to 52nd Street (Cadet, 1967)
- A Generation Ago Today (Verve, 1967)
- Blues – The Common Ground (Verve, 1968)
- Night Song (Verve, 1968)
- Asphalt Canyon Suite (Verve, 1969)
- Kenny Clarke Meets the Detroit Jazzmen (BYG, 1970)
- Guitar Genius in Japan with Attila Zoller, Jim Hall (Overseas, 1970)
- God Bless the Child (CTI, 1971)
- Cool Cookin' (Cadet, 1972)
- 'Round Midnight (Fantasy, 1972)
- Both Feet on the Ground (Fantasy, 1973)
- Up the Street, 'Round the Corner, Down the Block (Fantasy, 1974)
- Ellington Is Forever (Fantasy, 1975)
- Sky Street (Fantasy, 1976)
- Ellington Is Forever Volume Two (Fantasy, 1977)
- Tin Tin Deo (Concord Jazz, 1977)
- Monday Stroll (Savoy, 1978)
- Handcrafted (Muse, 1978)
- Stormy Monday (Fantasy, 1978)
- When Lights Are Low (Concord Jazz, 1979)
- Freedom (Blue Note, 1979)
- K. B. Blues (Blue Note, 1979)
- Swingin' (Blue Note, 1980)
- Live at the Village Vanguard (Muse, 1980)
- Moon and Sand (Concord Jazz, 1980)
- Heritage (AudioSource, 1980)
- Kenny Burrell in New York (Muse, 1981)
- Listen to the Dawn (Muse, 1983)
- Bluesin' Around (Columbia, 1983)
- Groovin' High (Muse, 1984)
- A la Carte (Muse, 1985)
- Togethering with Grover Washington Jr. (Blue Note, 1985)
- Generation (Blue Note, 1987)
- Pieces of Blue and the Blues (Blue Note, 1988)
- Guiding Spirit (Contemporary, 1990)
- Sunup to Sundown (Contemporary, 1991)
- Ellington a la Carte (Muse, 1993)
- Midnight at the Village Vanguard (Bellaphon, 1994)
- No Problem with Ray Bryant (EmArcy, 1994)
- Lotus Blossom (Concord Jazz, 1995)
- Then Along Came Kenny (Evidence, 1996)
- Live at the Blue Note (Concord Jazz, 1996)
- Laid Back (32 Jazz, 1998)
- Love Is the Answer (Concord Jazz, 1998)
- Stormy Monday Blues (Fantasy, 2001)
- Lucky So and So (Concord Jazz, 2001)
- Blue Muse (Concord Jazz, 2003)
- 75th Birthday Bash Live! (Blue Note, 2007)
- Prime: Live at the Downtown Room (HighNote, 2009)
- Be Yourself (HighNote, 2010)
- Tenderly (HighNote, 2011)
- Special Requests and Other Favorites: Live at Catalina's (HighNote, 2013)
- The Road to Love (HighNote, 2015)
- Unlimited 1: Live at Catalina's (HighNote, 2016)

=== As sideman ===
With Gene Ammons

- Funky (Prestige, 1957)
- Jammin' in Hi Fi with Gene Ammons (Prestige, 1957)
- Bad! Bossa Nova (Prestige, 1962)

With Chet Baker

- Chet (Riverside, 1959)
- Baby Breeze (Limelight, 1965)

With Aaron Bell

- Music from 77 Sunset Strip (Lion, 1959)
- Richard Rodgers' Victory at Sea in Jazz (Lion, 1959)

With Andy and the Bey Sisters

- Andy and the Bey Sisters (RCA Victor, 1961)
- Round Midnight (Prestige, 1965)

With Ray Brown

- Much in Common with Milt Jackson (Verve, 1964)
- Some of My Best Friends Are...Guitarists (Telarc, 2002)

With Donald Byrd

- Motor City Scene (Bethlehem, 1960)
- A New Perspective (Blue Note, 1964)
- Up with Donald Byrd (Verve, 1965)

With Betty Carter

- 'Round Midnight (Atco, 1963)
- Inside Betty Carter (United Artists, 1964)

With Paul Chambers

- Bass on Top (Blue Note, 1957)
- Whims of Chambers (Blue Note, 1957)

With Chris Connor

- Chris in Person (Atlantic, 1959)
- Sings Ballads of the Sad Cafe (Atlantic, 1959)

With Blossom Dearie

- My Gentleman Friend (Verve, 1959)
- Blossom Dearie Sings Comden and Green (Verve, 1959)

With Tommy Flanagan

- The Cats (New Jazz, 1959)
- Beyond the Blue Bird (Timeless, 1991)

With Frank Foster

- No 'Count (Savoy, 1956)
- All Day Long (Metronome, 1958)

With Aretha Franklin

- Yeah!!! (Columbia, 1965)
- Soul '69 (Atlantic, 1969)

With Red Garland

- Red Garland Revisited! (Prestige, 1969)
- Stepping Out (Galaxy, 1981)
- So Long Blues (Galaxy, 1984)

With Stan Getz

- Reflections (Verve, 1964)
- Getz Au Go Go (Verve, 1964)
- What the World Needs Now: Stan Getz Plays Burt Bacharach and Hal David (Verve, 1968)

With Coleman Hawkins

- Soul (Prestige, 1958)
- The Hawk Relaxes (Moodsville/Prestige, 1961)

With Milt Jackson

- Bags & Flutes (Atlantic, 1957)
- Bean Bags with Coleman Hawkins (Atlantic, 1959)
- Vibrations (Atlantic, 1964)

With Illinois Jacquet

- Illinois Jacquet (Epic, 1963)
- The Message (Argo, 1963)
- Desert Winds (Argo, 1964)

With Thad Jones

- Detroit – New York Junction (Blue Note, 1956)
- After Hours (Prestige, 1957)

With Johnny Hodges

- Sandy's Gone (Verve, 1964) – rec. 1965
- Mess of Blues with Wild Bill Davis (Verve, 1964)
- Blue Rabbit (Verve, 1964)
- Stride Right with Earl Hines (Verve, 1966)
- Blue Notes (Verve, 1966)

With Shirley Horn

- Loads of Love (Mercury, 1963)
- Travelin' Light (ABC-Paramount, 1965)

With Etta Jones

- Hollar! (Prestige, 1963)
- Love Shout (Prestige, 1963)
- Etta Jones Sings (Roulette, 1966)

With Hank Jones

- Porgy and Bess (Capitol, 1959)
- Here's Love (Argo, 1963)
- Ain't Misbehavin' (Galaxy, 1979)

With Quincy Jones

- The Birth of a Band! (Mercury, 1959)
- Plays Hip Hits (Mercury, 1963)

With Wynton Kelly

- Wynton Kelly (Riverside, 1958)
- Comin' in the Back Door (Verve, 1963)
- It's All Right! (Verve, 1964)
- Whisper Not (Jazzland, 1965)

With Jack McDuff

- Screamin' (Prestige, 1963)
- Somethin' Slick! (Prestige, 1963)
- Steppin' Out (Prestige, 1969)
- Plays for Beautiful People (Prestige, 1969)

With Gary McFarland

- The Jazz Version of "How to Succeed in Business without Really Trying" (Verve, 1962)
- Soft Samba (Verve, 1964)
- The In Sound (Verve, 1966)

With Dave Pike

- Bossa Nova Carnival (New Jazz, 1962)
- Times Out of Mind (Muse, 1976)

With Freddie Roach

- Down to Earth (Blue Note, 1962)
- Mo' Greens Please (Blue Note, 1963)

With Jimmy Smith

- House Party (Blue Note, 1958)
- The Sermon! (Blue Note, 1959)
- Home Cookin' (Blue Note, 1961)
- Midnight Special (Blue Note, 1961)
- Back at the Chicken Shack (Blue Note, 1963)
- Any Number Can Win (Verve, 1963)
- Softly as a Summer Breeze (Blue Note, 1965)
- The Cat (Verve, 1964)
- Who's Afraid of Virginia Woolf? (Verve, 1964)
- Christmas '64 (Verve, 1964)
- Monster (Verve, 1965)
- Organ Grinder Swing (Verve, 1965)
- Got My Mojo Workin' (Verve, 1965)
- Hoochie Coochie Man (Verve, 1966)
- Confirmation (Blue Note, 1979)
- Second Coming (Mojo, 1981)
- Keep On Comin (Elektra/Musician, 1983)
- Go for Whatcha Know (Blue Note, 1986)
- Fourmost (Milestone, 1991) – live rec. 1990
- The Master (Blue Note, 1994)
- The Master II (Blue Note, 1994)
- Standards (Blue Note, 1998) – rec. 1957–1959
- Six Views of the Blues (Blue Note, 1999) – rec. 1958
- Fourmost Return (Milestone, 2001) – live rec. 1990

With Sylvia Syms

- The Fabulous Sylvia Syms (20th Century Fox, 1964)
- Sylvia Is! (Prestige, 1965)

With Cal Tjader

- Warm Wave (Verve, 1964)
- Soul Sauce (Verve, 1965)

With Stanley Turrentine

- Hustlin' (Blue Note, 1965)
- Joyride (Blue Note, 1965)
- The Look of Love (Blue Note, 1968)
- Always Something There (Blue Note, 1968)
- The Sugar Man (CTI, 1975)
- Jubilee Shout!!! (Blue Note, 1986)

With Frank Wess

- North, South, East....Wess (Savoy 1956)
- Opus in Swing (Savoy, 1956)
- Jazz for Playboys (Savoy, 1957)

With Ernie Wilkins

- The Big New Band of the 60's (Everest, 1960)
- Screaming Mothers (Mainstream, 1974)

With Joe Williams

- Me and the Blues (RCA Victor, 1964)
- That Holiday Feelin' (Verve, 1990)

With Kai Winding

- Soul Surfin' (Verve, 1963)
- Rainy Day (Verve, 1965)
- More Brass (Verve, 1966)

With Jimmy Witherspoon

- Goin' to Kansas City Blues (RCA Victor, 1958)
- Baby, Baby, Baby (Prestige, 1963)
- Blue Spoon (Prestige, 1964)

With Leo Wright

- Suddenly the Blues (Atlantic, 1962)
- Soul Talk (Vortex, 1970)

With others

- Nat Adderley, Little Big Horn (Riverside, 1963)
- Mose Allison, Ever Since the World Ended (Blue Note, 1987)
- Ernestine Anderson, My Kinda Swing (Mercury, 1961)
- Louis Armstrong, Louis Armstrong and His Friends (Flying Dutchman, 1971)
- Ray Barretto, Portraits in Jazz and Clave (RCA Victor, 1999)
- Bill Barron, West Side Story Bossa Nova (Dauntless, 1963)
- Tony Bennett, Tony Bennett at Carnegie Hall (Columbia, 1962)
- Eubie Blake, Vol. 2 The Marches I Played On the Old Ragtime Piano (20th Century, 1978)
- Dee Dee Bridgewater, Dear Ella (Verve, 1997)
- Ronnell Bright, Bright's Spot (Regent, 1957)
- Charles Brown, Ballads My Way (Mainstream, 1965)
- James Brown, Please Please Please (King, 1958)
- James Brown, Try Me! (King, 1959)
- Milt Buckner, Mighty High (Argo, 1960)
- Vinnie Burke, Vinnie Burke's String Jazz Quartet (ABC-Paramount, 1957)
- Gary Burton & Sonny Rollins & Clark Terry, 3 in Jazz (RCA Victor, 1963)
- Ray Charles and Milt Jackson, Soul Meeting (Atlantic, 1961)
- Kenny Clarke, Jazzmen Detroit (Savoy, 1994)
- Buck Clayton, Buckin' the Blues (Vanguard, 1957)
- Nat King Cole, The Nat King Cole Story (Capitol, 1961)
- Jackie Davis, Most Happy Hammond (Capitol, 1958)
- Kenny Dorham, 'Round About Midnight at the Cafe Bohemia (Blue Note, 1956)
- Jean DuShon, Feeling Good (Cadet, 1965)
- Duke Ellington, Music Is My Mistress (Musicmasters, 1989)
- Bill Evans, Quintessence (Fantasy, 1977)
- Gil Evans, The Individualism of Gil Evans (Verve, 1964)
- Art Farmer, PhD (Contemporary, 1989)
- Terry Gibbs, Take It from Me (Impulse!, 1964)
- Astrud Gilberto, Brazilian Mood (Metro, 1977)
- Dizzy Gillespie, School Days (Regent, 1957)
- Paul Gonsalves, Cleopatra Feelin' Jazzy (Impulse!, 1963)
- Babs Gonzales, Tales of Manhattan (Jaro, 1959)
- Stephane Grappelli, So Easy to Remember (Omega, 1993)
- Lionel Hampton, The Many Sides of Hamp (Glad, 1961)
- Roland Hanna, Destry Rides Again (Atco, 1959)
- Eddie Harris, Cool Sax from Hollywood to Broadway (Columbia, 1965)
- Gene Harris, World Tour 1990 (Concord Jazz, 1991)
- Nancy Harrow, Wild Women Don't Have the Blues (Candid, 1961)
- Johnny Hartman, I Just Dropped by to Say Hello (Impulse!, 1964)
- Jimmy Heath, On the Trail (Riverside, 1964)
- David Hess, Climbing Up the Sunshine Path (Diggler, 2005)
- Jay Hoggard, The Fountain (Muse, 1992)
- Billie Holiday, Lady Sings the Blues (Clef, 1956)
- Kenyon Hopkins, The Yellow Canary (Verve, 1963)
- Lena Horne, Stormy Weather (RCA Victor, 1957)
- John Jenkins, John Jenkins with Kenny Burrell (Blue Note, 1957)
- Budd Johnson, French Cookin' (Argo, 1963)
- J. J. Johnson, Broadway Express (RCA Victor, 1966)
- Salena Jones, Salena Sings Jobim with the Jobims (Vine Gate Music, 1997)
- Taft Jordan, Mood Indigo!! (Moodsville, 1961)
- Joe Kennedy Jr., Strings by Candlelight (Consolidated Artists, 1998)
- Barney Kessel, Live in Los Angeles at P.J.'s Club (Gambit, 2006)
- Yusef Lateef, The Blue Yusef Lateef (Atlantic, 1968)
- Hubert Laws, Laws' Cause (Atlantic, 1969)
- Leiber-Stoller Big Band, Yakety Yak (Atlantic, 1960)
- John Letman, The Many Angles of John Letman (Bethlehem, 1960)
- Melba Liston, Melba Liston and Her 'Bones (Metrojazz, 1959)
- Gloria Lynne, At Basin Street East (Everest, 1962)
- Gildo Mahones, I'm Shooting High (Prestige, 1963)
- Miriam Makeba, Makeba Sings! (RCA Victor, 1965)
- Herbie Mann, Just Wailin (New Jazz, 1958)
- Jimmy McGriff, The Big Band (Solid State, 1966)
- Big Miller, Did You Ever Hear the Blues? (United Artists, 1959)
- Billy Mitchell, A Little Juicy (Philips, 1964)
- Marian Montgomery, Swings for Winners and Losers (Capitol, 1963)
- Wes Montgomery, Fusion! Wes Montgomery with Strings (Riverside, 1963)
- Frank Morgan, Listen to the Dawn (Verve, 1994)
- Maria Muldaur, Sweet Harmony (Reprise, 1976)
- Frankie Ortega & Sy Oliver, 77 Sunset Strip and Other Selections (Jubilee, 1959)
- Billie Poole, Confessin' the Blues (Riverside, 1963)
- Phil Porter, Introducing Phil Porter and His Organ (United Artists, 1963)
- Dory Previn & Andre Previn, Dory Previn & Andre Previn (DRG, 1982)
- Sam Price, Rock with Sam Price (Savoy, 1957)
- Ike Quebec, Soul Samba (Blue Note, 1962)
- Irene Reid, Room for One More (Verve, 1965)
- Jerome Richardson, Midnight Oil (New Jazz, 1961)
- Sonny Rollins, Alfie (Impulse!, 1966)
- Charlie Rouse, Bossa Nova Bacchanal (Blue Note, 1963)
- Vanessa Rubin, I'm Glad There Is You (RCA, 1994)
- Jimmy Rushing, Every Day I Have the Blues (Bluesway, 1967)
- A. K. Salim, Flute Suite (Savoy, 1957)
- Lalo Schifrin, Once a Thief and Other Themes (Verve, 1965)
- Shirley Scott, Travelin' Light (Prestige, 1994)
- Zoot Sims, Recado Bossa Nova (Fresh Sound, 1992)
- Carol Sloane, Love You Madly (Contemporary, 1989)
- Dakota Staton, Time to Swing (Capitol, 1959)
- Idrees Sulieman, Interplay for 2 Trumpets and 2 Tenors (Prestige, 1957)
- Clark Terry, 3 in Jazz (RCA, 1963)
- Ed Thigpen, Out of the Storm (Verve, 1966)
- Jim Tyler, Twist (Time, 1962)
- Dicky Wells, Trombone Four-in-Hand (Felsted, 1959)
- Dinah Washington, What a Diff'rence a Day Makes! (Mercury, 1959)
- Doug Watkins, Watkins at Large (Transition, 1956)
- Randy Weston, Uhuru Afrika (Roulette, 1961)
