= Encyclopedia of Jazz =

1967 album by Oliver Nelson

Studio album by Oliver Nelson/Jimmy Smith & Wes Montgomery/Count Basie/Johnny Hodges & Earl Hines
- Released: 1967
- Recorded: October 8, 1965, January 14, 1966, September 28, 1966 and November 3 & 4, 1966
- Studios: NYC and Van Gelder Studio, Englewood Cliffs, NJ
- Genre: Jazz
- Length: 32:00
- Labels: Verve; V/V6 8677
- Producer: Creed Taylor

Oliver Nelson chronology
Happenings (1966)	Encyclopedia of Jazz (1967)	The Sound of Feeling (1966-67)

Encyclopedia of Jazz (full title Leonard Feather Encyclopedia of Jazz (in the Sixties) Volume One: The Blues) is an album released on the Verve label compiled by jazz journalist Leonard Feather featuring tracks which were recorded to accompany Feather's Encyclopedia of Jazz in the Sixties . The album features three tracks by the Encyclopedia of Jazz All Stars arranged and conducted by Oliver Nelson along with one track each by Jimmy Smith with Wes Montgomery, Count Basie and Johnny Hodges with Earl Hines.

== Reception ==
Professional ratings
Review scores
Source	Rating
Allmusic	3/5 stars

The Allmusic site awarded the album 3 stars stating "This diverse LP, which was released in conjunction with Leonard Feather's Encyclopedia of Jazz in the Sixties, is most significant for including three songs by a group led by arranger Oliver Nelson that was called "Leonard Feather's Encyclopedia of Jazz All-Stars"".

== Track listing ==
No.	Title	Writer(s)	Recording place and date	Length
1.	"St. Louis Blues"	W. C. Handy	Van Geder Studio, Englewood Cliffs, NJ, Nov 3, 1966	6:10
2.	"I Remember Bird"	Leonard Feather	Van Geder Studio, Englewood Cliffs, NJ, Nov 3, 1966	6:25
3.	"John Brown's Blues"	Traditional	Van Geder Studio, Englewood Cliffs, NJ, Nov 4, 1966	3:20
4.	"OGD"	Wes Montgomery	Van Geder Studio, Englewood Cliffs, NJ, Sept 28, 1966	5:15
5.	"Blues for Eileen"	Eric Dixon	New York, NY, October 8, 1965	5:45
6.	"C Jam Blues"	Duke Ellington	New York, NY, January 14, 1966	5:05

== Personnel ==
Tracks 1–3:

- Oliver Nelson - arranger, conductor
- Nat Adderley (track 3), Burt Collins (track 1 & 2), Joe Newman, Ernie Royal, Clark Terry, Joe Wilder, Snooky Young - trumpet, flugelhorn
- Jimmy Cleveland, J. J. Johnson - trombone
- Tony Studd - bass trombone
- Bob Brookmeyer - valve trombone
- Jerry Dodgion, Phil Woods - alto saxophone
- Jerome Richardson, Zoot Sims - tenor saxophone
- Danny Bank - baritone saxophone
- Al Dailey (tracks 1 & 2), Hank Jones (track 3) - piano
- Eric Gale - guitar
- Ron Carter - bass
- Grady Tate - drum kit
- Bobby Rosengarden - percussion

Track 4:

- Jimmy Smith - organ
- Wes Montgomery - guitar
- Grady Tate - drums
- Ray Barretto - congas

Track 5:

- Count Basie - piano
- Al Aarons, Sonny Cohn, Wallace Davenport, Phil Guilbeau - trumpet
- Henderson Chambers, Al Grey, Grover Mitchell - trombone
- Bill Hughes - bass trombone
- Bobby Plater, Marshall Royal - alto saxophone
- Eric Dixon - tenor saxophone, flute, arranger
- Eddie "Lockjaw" Davis - tenor saxophone
- Charles Fowlkes - baritone saxophone
- Freddie Green - guitar
- Norman Keenan - bass
- Rufus Jones - drums

Track 6:

- Johnny Hodges - alto saxophone
- Earl Hines - piano
- Kenny Burrell - guitar
- Richard Davis - bass
- Joe Marshall - drums
