= Basie Picks the Winners =

Studio album by Count Basie
- Released: 1965
- Recorded: 1965
- Genre: Jazz
- Length: 42:24
- Label: Verve

Count Basie chronology
Pop Goes the Basie (1965)	Basie Picks the Winners (1965)	Basie Meets Bond (1966)

Professional ratings
Review scores
Source	Rating
Allmusic	3/5 stars
Record Mirror	4/5 stars

Basie Picks the Winners is a 1965 studio album by Count Basie and his orchestra.

== Track listing ==
1. "Watermelon Man" (Herbie Hancock) – 3:11
2. "That's All" (Alan Brandt, Bob Haymes) – 3:20
3. "I Won't Cry Anymore" (Al Frisch, Fred Wise) – 2:22
4. "Exodus" (Ernest Gold) – 3:05
5. "I'll Get By (As Long as I Have You)" (Fred E. Ahlert, Roy Turk) – 3:15
6. "My Kind of Town" (Sammy Cahn, Jimmy Van Heusen) – 2:40
7. "I'm Walkin'" (Dave Bartholomew, Fats Domino) – 3:34
8. "Come Rain or Come Shine" (Harold Arlen, Johnny Mercer) – 2:51
9. "Volare" (Domenico Modugno) – 2:44
10. "Nobody Knows You When You're Down and Out" (Count Basie, Jimmy Rushing, Lester Young) – 2:05
11. "Oh, Lonesome Me" (Don Gibson) – 2:59

== Personnel ==
The Count Basie Orchestra

- Count Basie - piano
- Billy Byers - arranger
- Leon Thomas - vocalist
- Al Aarons - trumpet
- Sonny Cohn - trumpet
- Sam Noto - trumpet
- Wallace Davenport - trumpet
- Al Grey - trombone
- Grover Mitchell - trombone
- Bill Hughes - trombone
- Henderson Chambers - trombone
- Bobby Plater - alto saxophone
- Marshall Royal - alto saxophone
- Eddie "Lockjaw" Davis - tenor saxophone
- Eric Dixon - tenor saxophone
- Charlie Fowlkes - baritone saxophone
- Freddie Green - guitar
- Wyatt "Bull" Ruether - bass
- Irv Cottler - drums
- J.C. Heard - drums
