= Basie Big Band =

Studio album by Count Basie and Orchestra
- Released: 1975
- Recorded: August 26–27, 1975
- Genre: Swing; Big band
- Label: Pablo
- Producer: Norman Granz

Count Basie chronology
| Count Basie Jam Session at the Montreux Jazz Festival 1975 (1975) | Basie Big Band (1975) | For the Second Time (1975) |

Professional ratings
Review scores
| Source | Rating |
|---|---|
| Allmusic | 2/5 stars |
| The Penguin Guide to Jazz Recordings | 3/4 stars |

Basie Big Band is a 1975 studio album by Count Basie and his orchestra.

== Track listing ==
1. "Front Burner" – 5:54
2. "Freckle Face" – 6:26
3. "Orange Sherbet" – 3:42
4. "Soft as Velvet" – 3:51
5. "The Heat's On" – 2:47
6. "Midnight Freight" – 6:08
7. "Give 'M Time" – 6:07
8. "The Wind Machine" – 3:08
9. "Tall Cotton" – 5:50

All music by Sammy Nestico.

== Personnel ==
- Count Basie – piano
- Pete Minger – trumpet
- Frank Szabo
- Dave Stahl
- Bobby Mitchell
- Sonny Cohn
- Al Grey – trombone
- Curtis Fuller
- Bill Hughes
- Mel Wanzo - trombone
- Bobby Plater – alto saxophone
- Danny Turner
- Jimmy Forrest – tenor saxophone
- Eric Dixon
- Charlie Fowlkes – baritone saxophone
- John Duke – double bass
- Freddie Green – guitar
- Butch Miles – drums
