= Fun Time (album) =

Live album by Count Basie
- Released: 1975
- Recorded: July 19, 1975
- Venues: Montreux Jazz Festival, Switzerland
- Genre: Jazz
- Length: 42:24
- Label: Pablo
- Producer: Norman Granz

Count Basie chronology
Basie & Zoot (1975)	Fun Time (1975)	Count Basie Jam Session at the Montreux Jazz Festival 1975 (1975)

Professional ratings
Review scores
Source	Rating
Allmusic	3/5 stars
The Penguin Guide to Jazz Recordings	3/4 stars

Fun Time is a 1975 live album by Count Basie and his orchestra, recorded at the 1975 Montreux Jazz Festival.

== Track listing ==
1. "Fun Time" (Sammy Nestico) – 3:28
2. "Why Not?" (Hefti) – 3:29
3. "Lil' Darlin" (Hefti) – 5:32
4. "In a Mellow Tone" (Duke Ellington, Milt Gabler) – 5:39
5. "Body and Soul" (Frank Eyton, Johnny Green, Edward Heyman, Robert Sour) – 6:33
6. "Good Times Blues" (Ernie Wilkins) – 5:44
7. "I Hate You Baby" (Bill Caffey, Billy Grey, Heard) – 4:44
8. "Lonesome Blues" (Caffey) – 1:50
9. "Whirley Bird" (Hefti) – 9:54
10. "One O'Clock Jump" (Count Basie) – 1:59

== Personnel ==
The Count Basie Orchestra

- Count Basie – piano
- Sonny Cohn – trumpet
- Frank Szabo
- Pete Minger
- Dave Stahl
- Bobby Mitchell
- Bill Hughes – trombone
- Curtis Fuller
- Mel Wanzo – trombone
- Al Grey
- Bobby Plater – alto saxophone
- Danny Turner
- Eric Dixon – tenor saxophone
- Jimmy Forrest
- Charlie Fowlkes – baritone saxophone
- Freddie Green – guitar
- John Duke – double bass
- Butch Miles – drums
- Bill Caffey – Vocals
