= Easin' It =

Studio album by Count Basie
- Released: 1962
- Recorded: December 1960 & 11, 25 & 26, July 1962
- Genre: Jazz, swing, blues
- Length: 38:39
- Label: Roulette

Count Basie chronology
Count Basie and the Kansas City 7 (1962)	Easin' It (1962)	Back with Basie (1962)

Professional ratings
Review scores
Source	Rating
Allmusic	3/5 stars
The Rolling Stone Jazz Record Guide	4/5 stars

Easin' It is a studio album by Count Basie and his orchestra recorded between 1960 and 1962. The album contains a collaboration by Frank Foster, a well known member from Basie's big band. All tracks were composed, arranged and conducted by Foster and is a mixture of jazz and blues.

The tune Easin' It became a great success for Basie those years. It was one of the most performed tunes in his concerts in the early 60's.

== Track listing ==
1. Easin' It - 6:12
2. Brotherly Shove - 3:17
3. Blues for Daddy-O - 8:56
4. Four, Five, Six - 4:40
5. Misunderstood Blues - 6:05
6. Mama Dev Blues - 4:44
7. It's About That Time - 4:17

All compositions by Frank Foster

== Personnel ==
The Count Basie Orchestra

- Count Basie - piano
- Freddie Green - guitar
- Eddie Jones - bass - (tracks 1–3)
- Sonny Payne - drums - (tracks 1–3)
- Snooky Young - trumpet - (tracks 1–3)
- Thad Jones - trumpet
- Sonny Cohn - trumpet
- Joe Newman - trumpet - (tracks 1–3)
- Clark Terry - trumpet - (tracks 1–3)
- Al Grey - trombone - (tracks 1–3)
- Henry Coker - trombone
- Benny Powell - trombone
- Marshal Royal - alto sax, clarinet
- Frank Wess - alto sax, tenor sax, flute
- Frank Foster - tenor sax, arranger, conductor
- Billy Mitchell - tenor sax - (tracks 1–3)
- Charlie Fowlkes - baritone sax
- Art Davis - bass - (track 4)
- Gus Johnson - drums - (track 4)
- Flip Ricard - trumpet - (tracks 4–7)
- Al Aarons - trumpet - (tracks 4–7)
- Eric Dixon - tenor sax, flute - (tracks 4–7)
- Ike Isaacs - bass - (tracks 5–7)
- Louis Bellson - drums - (tracks 5–7)
- Quentin Jackson - trombone - (tracks 4–7)
