= The Board of Directors Annual Report =

Studio album by The Mills Brothers and Count Basie
- Released: 1968
- Recorded: July 2 & 3, 1968, New York City, U.S.
- Genre: Jazz
- Label: Dot
- Producer: Teddy Reig and Tom Mack

Count Basie chronology
Manufacturers of Soul (1968)	The Board of Directors Annual Report (1968)	Basie Straight Ahead (1968)

The Board of Directors Annual Report is an album by vocal group The Mills Brothers with pianist and bandleader Count Basie and His Orchestra featuring performances recorded in 1968 and released on the Dot label. The album follows Basie's 1967 collaboration with The Mills Brothers The Board of Directors.

== Reception ==
Professional ratings
Review scores
Source	Rating
AllMusic	4/5 stars
The Penguin Guide to Jazz Recordings	3/4 stars

AllMusic awarded the album 4 stars stating "As usual, it's the supposedly timely material that sounds dated, while the old favorites remain timeless. Nevertheless, this is an excellent match-up that should have been tried earlier and more often".

== Track listing ==
1. "Gentle on My Mind" (John Hartford) – 2:39
2. "Cherry" (Don Redman, Ray Gilbert) – 3:23
3. "You Never Miss the Water Till the Well Runs Dry" (Arthur Kent, Paul Secon) – 2:49
4. "Glow Worm" (Paul Lincke, Lilla Cayley Robinson, Johnny Mercer) – 2:21
5. "Sent for You Yesterday and Here You Come Today" (Count Basie, Eddie Durham, Jimmy Rushing) – 3:34
6. "Sunny" (Bobby Hebb) – 3:28
7. "I'll Be Around" (Alec Wilder) – 2:49
8. "Cielito Lindo" (John Redmond, James Cavanaugh) – 2:17
9. "Blue and Sentimental" (Basie, Jerry Livingston, Mack David) – 3:30
10. "Every Day" (Basie) – 2:54

== Personnel ==
- The Mills Brothers – vocals
- Count Basie – piano
- Oscar Brashear, Gene Goe, Sonny Cohn – trumpet
- Al Aarons – trumpet, flugelhorn
- Richard Boone, Harlan Floyd, Grover Mitchell – trombone
- Bill Hughes – bass trombone
- Bobby Plater, Marshal Royal – alto saxophone
- Eddie "Lockjaw" Davis, Eric Dixon – tenor saxophone
- Charlie Fowlkes – baritone saxophone
- Freddie Green – guitar
- Norman Keenan – bass
- Harold Jones – drums
- Chico O'Farrill – arranger
