= Basie Meets Bond =

Studio album by Count Basie Orchestra
- Released: 1966
- Recorded: December 22–31, 1965
- Studio: Capitol (New York)
- Genre: Jazz, swing, big band
- Length: 36:24
- Label: United Artists
- Producer: Teddy Reig

Count Basie Orchestra chronology
Basie Picks the Winners (1965)	Basie Meets Bond (1966)	Live at the Sands (Before Frank) (1966)

Basie Meets Bond is a 1966 album by Count Basie and his orchestra. The album is a collection of musical pieces originating from the first four James Bond films; Dr No, From Russia with Love, Goldfinger and Thunderball. The album was Basie's first for United Records, and was produced by Teddy Reig.

== Reception ==
Professional ratings
Review scores
Source	Rating
AllMusic	3/5 stars
The Rolling Stone Jazz Record Guide	1/5 stars

Ken Dryden, writing on AllMusic said of the album that "While it seems doubtful that Basie added any of this music to his regular band repertoire, his band does its best to do justice to the arrangements." Dryden praised Eddie "Lockjaw" Davis's solo on "Goldfinger" and Marshall Royal and Count Basie's solos on "Thunderball". Dryden conceded that the album could be "safely bypassed by most jazz fans" but said that Basie's fans might "find this surprising LP worth the investment".

== Track listing ==
No.	Title	Writer(s)	Length
1.	"007"	John Barry	3:00
2.	"The Golden Horn"	Barry	3:43
3.	"Girl Trouble"	Barry	3:34
4.	"Kingston Calypso"	Monty Norman	2:23
5.	"Goldfinger"	Leslie Bricusse, Anthony Newley, Barry	4:04
6.	"Thunderball"	Don Black, Barry	4:00
7.	"From Russia with Love"	Lionel Bart	4:14
8.	"Dr. No's Fantasy"	Norman	3:56
9.	"Underneath the Mango Tree"	Norman	3:36
10.	"The James Bond Theme"	Norman	3:47
11.	"Dr. No's Fantasy (First Version)"	Norman	3:54

== Personnel ==
- The Count Basie Orchestra
  - Count Basie - piano
  - Al Aarons, Sonny Cohn, Wallace Davenport, Phil Guilbeau - trumpet
  - Henderson Chambers, Al Grey, Grover Mitchell - trombone
  - Bill Hughes - bass trombone
  - Marshal Royal - alto saxophone
  - Bobby Plater - alto saxophone, flute
  - Eric Dixon - tenor saxophone, flute
  - Eddie Lockjaw Davis - tenor saxophone
  - Charlie Fowlkes - baritone saxophone, bass clarinet
  - Freddie Green - guitar
  - Norman Keenan - bass guitar
  - Sonny Payne - drums
  - Chico O'Farrill, George Williams - arranger
- Teddy Reig - producer
