= Half a Sixpence (album) =

Studio album by Count Basie and His Orchestra
- Released: 1968
- Recorded: November 9 & 10, 1967; New York City
- Genre: Jazz
- Label: Dot; DLP 25834
- Producer: Teddy Reig and Tom Mack

Count Basie chronology
The Happiest Millionaire (1967)	Half a Sixpence (1968)	The Board of Directors (1967)

Half a Sixpence is an album pianist and bandleader Count Basie and His Orchestra featuring performances of music from the motion picture Half a Sixpence recorded in 1967 and released on the Dot label.

== Track listing ==
All compositions by David Heneker except as indicated

1. "Half a Sixpence" - 2:27
2. "A Proper Gentleman" - 2:09
3. "She's Too Far Above Me" - 3:01
4. "I Know What I Am" - 2:06
5. "This Is My World" (Heneker, Irwin Kostal) - 2:24
6. "All in the Cause of Economy" - 2:59
7. "If the Rain's Got to Fall" - 2:45
8. "I Don't Believe a Word Of It" - 2:30
9. "Flash, Bang, Wallop!" - 1:59
10. "The Race Is On" - 2:07
11. "I'm Not Talking to You" - 2:32
12. "Money to Burn" - 2:10
- Recorded in New York City on November 9, 1967 (tracks 3, 5, 6 & 11) and November 10, 1967 (tracks 1, 2, 4, 7-10 & 12)

== Personnel ==
- Count Basie - piano
- Gene Goe, Sam Noto (track 3, 5, 6 & 11), Victor Paz, Ernie Royal (tracks 1, 2, 4, 7-10 & 12) - trumpet
- Al Aarons - trumpet, flugelhorn
- Richard Boone, Harlan Floyd, Grover Mitchell - trombone
- Bill Hughes - bass trombone
- Bobby Plater, Marshal Royal - alto saxophone
- Eric Dixon, Illinois Jacquet - tenor saxophone
- Charlie Fowlkes - baritone saxophone
- Freddie Green - guitar
- Norman Keenan - bass
- Ed Shaughnessy - drums
- Chico O'Farrill - arranger
