= Hollywood...Basie's Way =

Studio album by Count Basie and His Orchestra
- Released: 1967
- Recorded: December 14 & 21, 1966 and January 16, 1967; Fine Sound Studio, NYC
- Genre: Jazz
- Label: Command; RS 912 SD
- Producer: Loren Becker, Robert Byrne and Teddy Reig

Count Basie chronology
Broadway Basie's...Way (1966)	Hollywood...Basie's Way (1967)	Basie's Beat (1967)

Hollywood...Basie's Way is an album by pianist and bandleader Count Basie and His Orchestra featuring performances of motion picture theme recorded in late 1966 and early 1967 and released on the Command label.

== Track listing ==
1. "Secret Love" (Sammy Fain, Paul Francis Webster) - 2:56
2. "Laura" (David Raksin, Johnny Mercer) - 2:23
3. "In the Still of the Night" (Cole Porter) - 1:56
4. "A Foggy Day" (George Gershwin, Ira Gershwin) - 2:14
5. "The Shadow of Your Smile" (Johnny Mandel, Webster) - 3:21
6. "The Trolley Song" (Hugh Martin, Ralph Blane) - 2:16
7. "Strangers in the Night" (Bert Kaempfert, Charles Singleton, Eddie Snyder) - 2:55
8. "A Fine Romance" (Jerome Kern, Dorothy Fields) - 2:44
9. "Carioca" (Vincent Youmans, Edward Eliscu, Gus Kahn) - 2:21
10. "Hurry Sundown Blues" (Hugo Montenegro, Buddy Kaye) - 2:40
11. "It Might as Well Be Spring" (Richard Rodgers, Oscar Hammerstein II) - 2:28
12. "Days of Wine and Roses" (Henry Mancini, Mercer) - 2:38
- Recorded on December 14, 1966 (tracks 1–3 & 12), December 21, 1966 (tracks 4, 6, 8 & 11) and January 16, 1967 (tracks 5, 7, 9 & 10)

== Personnel ==
- Count Basie - piano
- Al Aarons, Sonny Cohn, Gene Goe, Harry Edison - trumpet
- Richard Boone, Harlan Floyd, Grover Mitchell - trombone
- Bill Hughes - bass trombone
- Bobby Plater - alto saxophone, flute (tracks 5, 7, 9 & 10)
- Jerry Dodgion (tracks 1–4, 6, 8, 11 & 12), Marshal Royal - alto saxophone
- Eric Dixon - tenor saxophone, flute
- Eddie "Lockjaw" Davis - tenor saxophone
- Charlie Fowlkes - baritone saxophone
- Freddie Green - guitar
- Norman Keenan - bass
- Ed Shaughnessy - drums
- Chico O'Farrill - arranger
