= The Happiest Millionaire (album) =

Studio album by Count Basie and His Orchestra
- Released: November 1967
- Recorded: October 4, 5 & 6, 1967
- Studio: A & R (New York)
- Genre: Jazz
- Labels: Coliseum; D 41003/DS 51003
- Producer: Teddy Reig

Count Basie chronology
Basie's in the Bag (1967)	The Happiest Millionaire (1967)	Half a Sixpence (1967)

The Happiest Millionaire (complete title Count Basie Captures Walt Disney's The Happiest Millionaire) is an album by pianist and bandleader Count Basie and His Orchestra featuring performances of tunes featured in Walt Disney's motion picture The Happiest Millionaire recorded in 1967 and released on the Coliseum label.

== Track listing ==
All compositions by Richard M. Sherman and Robert B. Sherman

1. "Detroit"
2. "Strengthen the Dwelling"
3. "I Want to Be Irish"
4. "By Your Pom Pom"
5. "Valentine Candy"
6. "Watch Your Footwork"
7. "What's Wrong with That"
8. "Let's Have a Drink"
9. "Are We Dancing"
10. "Fortuosity"

Notes

- Recorded at A & R Recording in New York on October 4, 1967 (tracks 1, 2 & 5), October 5 (tracks 6, 8 & 10), and October 6 (tracks 3, 4, 7 & 9)
- Three song titles differ from their originals: "I'll Always Be Irish", "Bye-Yum Pum Pum", and "Let's Have a Drink on It"

== Personnel ==
- Count Basie - piano
- Al Aarons, Sonny Cohn, Gene Goe, Sam Noto - trumpet
- Richard Boone, Harlan Floyd, Grover Mitchell - trombone
- Bill Hughes - bass trombone
- Bobby Plater - alto saxophone, flute
- Marshal Royal - alto saxophone, clarinet
- Eric Dixon - tenor saxophone, flute
- Eddie "Lockjaw" Davis - tenor saxophone
- Charlie Fowlkes - baritone saxophone
- Freddie Green - guitar
- Norman Keenan - bass
- Louis Bellson - drums
- Chico O'Farrill - arranger
