= Pop Goes the Basie =

Studio album by Count Basie and His Orchestra
- Released: 1965
- Recorded: December 22–24, 1964; Los Angeles, CA
- Genre: Jazz
- Length: 34:13
- Label: Reprise; RS 6153
- Producer: Teddy Reig

Count Basie chronology
Our Shining Hour (1964)	Pop Goes the Basie (1965)	Basie Picks the Winners (1965)

Pop Goes the Basie is an album by pianist and bandleader Count Basie featuring jazz versions of contemporary hits recorded in 1964 and originally released on the Reprise label.

== Reception ==
Professional ratings
Review scores
Source	Rating
AllMusic	3/5 stars

AllMusic awarded the album 3 stars.

== Track listing ==
Side One:

1. "Your Cheatin' Heart" (Hank Williams) – 3:03
2. "The Hucklebuck" (Andy Gibson, Roy Alfred) – 2:50
3. "Oh, Pretty Woman" (Roy Orbison, Bill Dees) – 2:51
4. "Call Me Irresponsible" (Jimmy Van Heusen, Sammy Cahn) – 2:42
5. "Walk Right In" (Gus Cannon, Hosea Woods) – 2:55
6. "Go Away Little Girl" (Gerry Goffin, Carole King) – 3:03

Side Two:

1. "Oh Soul Mio" (Billy Byers) – 3:03
2. "Bye Bye Love" (Felice Bryant, Boudleaux Bryant) – 2:30
3. "Do Wah Diddy Diddy" (Ellie Greenwich, Jeff Barry) – 3:04
4. "He's Got The Whole World In His Hands" (Traditional) – 3:29
5. "Shangri-La" (Carl Sigman, Matty Malneck, Robert Maxwell) – 3:45
6. "At Long Last Love" (Cole Porter, Robert Katscher) – 2:57

== Personnel ==
- Count Basie – piano
- Al Aarons, Sonny Cohn, Wallace Davenport, Sam Noto – trumpet
- Henderson Chambers (tracks 1,4, 5, 7 9, 11 & 12), Henry Coker (tracks 2, 3, 6, 8 & 10), Al Grey (tracks 1,4, 5, 7 9, 11 & 12), Grover Mitchell, Gordon Thomas (tracks 2, 3, 6, 8 & 10) – trombone
- Bill Hughes – bass trombone
- Marshal Royal, Bobby Plater – alto saxophone
- Eddie "Lockjaw" Davis, Eric Dixon – tenor saxophone
- Charlie Fowlkes – baritone saxophone
- Freddie Green – guitar
- Wyatt Reuther – bass
- Louis Bellson, (tracks 5, 9 &12), Sonny Payne (tracks 1–4, 6–8, 9 & 11) – drums
- Leon Thomas – vocals (tracks 2, 3, 6, 8 & 10)
- Billy Byers – arranger, conductor
