= Basie's in the Bag =

1967 jazz album by Count Basie

Studio album by Count Basie and His Orchestra
- Released: 1967
- Recorded: August 15 & 17, 1967; Los Angeles, CA
- Genre: Jazz
- Label: Brunswick; BL 754127
- Producer: Teddy Reig

Count Basie chronology
Basie's Beat (1967)	Basie's in the Bag (1967)	The Happiest Millionaire (1967)

Professional ratings
Review scores
Source	Rating
The Rolling Stone Jazz Record Guide	3/5 stars

Basie's in the Bag is an album by pianist and bandleader Count Basie and His Orchestra featuring performances of contemporary popular tunes recorded in 1967 and released on the Brunswick label.

== Track listing ==
1. "Mercy, Mercy, Mercy" (Joe Zawinul) - 2:31
2. "Hang On Sloopy" (Wes Farrell, Bert Russell) - 2:40
3. "Don't Let the Sun Catch You Cryin'"(Joe Greene) - 2:02
4. "Ain't Too Proud to Beg" (Norman Whitfield, Edward Holland, Jr.) - 2:10
5. "Goin' Out of My Head" (Teddy Randazzo, Bobby Weinstein) - 2:08
6. "In the Heat of the Night" (Quincy Jones) - 2:12
7. "Green Onions" (Booker T. Jones, Steve Cropper, Lewie Steinberg, Al Jackson, Jr.) - 3:51
8. "Knock on Wood" (Eddie Floyd, Cropper) - 1:54
9. "Let the Good Times Roll" (Shirley Goodman, Leonard Lee) - 2:15
10. "Bright Lights, Big City" (Jimmy Reed) - 2:44
11. "Reach Out I'll Be There" (Brian Holland, Lamont Dozier, Eddie Holland) - 2:15
12. "Memphis, Tennessee" (Chuck Berry) - 2:32
- Recorded in Los Angeles on August 15, 1967 (tracks 1–5, 7, 8 & 10) and August 17, 1967 (tracks 6, 9, 11 & 12)

== Personnel ==
- Count Basie - piano, organ
- Al Aarons, Sonny Cohn, Gene Goe, Harry Edison - trumpet
- Richard Boone, Harlan Floyd, Grover Mitchell - trombone
- Bill Hughes - bass trombone
- Bobby Plater, Marshal Royal - alto saxophone
- Eddie "Lockjaw" Davis, Eric Dixon - tenor saxophone
- Charlie Fowlkes - baritone saxophone
- Freddie Green - guitar
- Norman Keenan - bass
- Louis Bellson (tracks 2, 5–9, 11 & 12), Irv Cottler (tracks: 1, 3, 4 & 10) - drums
- Chico O'Farrill - arranger
