= Standing Ovation (Count Basie album) =

Live album by Count Basie and His Orchestra
- Released: 1969
- Recorded: January 28–30, 1969; Tropicana Hotel in Las Vegas, NV
- Genre: Jazz
- Length: 47:41
- Label: Dot; DLP 25938
- Producer: Teddy Reig, Tom Mack

Count Basie chronology
How About This (1968)	Standing Ovation (1969)	Basic Basie (1969)

Standing Ovation (subtitled 3 Eras of Basie Recorded Live at the Tropicana Hotel, Las Vegas) is a live album by pianist and bandleader Count Basie featuring performances recorded at the Tropicana Resort & Casino in Las Vegas in 1969 and released on the Dot label.

== Reception ==
Professional ratings
Review scores
Source	Rating
AllMusic	4/5 stars

AllMusic awarded the album 4 stars stating "The music is, of course, great, and the players respond to the excitement of the live audience".

== Track listing ==
1. "Down for Double" (Freddie Green) - 3:02
2. "Li'l Darlin'" (Neal Hefti) - 4:52
3. "Broadway" (Bill Byrd, Teddy McRae, Henri Woode) - 3:34
4. "Jive at Five" (Count Basie, Harry Edison) - 3:57
5. "Cherry Point" (Hefti) - 5:00
6. "Jumpin' at the Woodside" (Basie) - 3:34
7. "One O'Clock Jump" (Basie) - 1:17
8. "Shiny Stockings" (Frank Foster) - 5:05
9. "Blue and Sentimental" (Basie, Mack David, Jerry Livingston) - 4:28
10. "Every Tub" (Basie, Eddie Durham) - 2:55
11. "Corner Pocket" (Green) - 5:56
12. "The Kid from Red Bank" (Hefti) - 2:30
13. "One O'Clock Jump" (Basie) - 1:31

== Personnel ==
- Count Basie - piano
- Al Aarons, Oscar Brashear, Gene Goe, Sonny Cohn, Harry Edison - trumpet
- Richard Boone, Frank Hooks, Grover Mitchell - trombone
- Bill Hughes - bass trombone
- Marshal Royal - alto saxophone
- Bobby Plater - alto saxophone, piccolo
- Eric Dixon - tenor saxophone, flute
- Eddie "Lockjaw" Davis - tenor saxophone
- Charlie Fowlkes - baritone saxophone
- Freddie Green - guitar
- Norman Keenan - bass
- Harold Jones - drums
