= List of Moldejazz celebrity artists =

This is a list of well-known artistic performers that have visited the international festival Moldejazz in Molde, Norway, through the years.

== Celebrity Moldejazz artists ==
- Benny Bailey (1961/70),
- Lucky Thompson (1962),
- Dexter Gordon (1963/64/65/71/72),
- Sonny Stitt (1963/81),
- Niels-Henning Ørsted Pedersen (1964–68, 70–74, 81, 84–85, 88–90, 93, 2000/02),
- Benny Golson (1964),
- Jimmy Witherspoon (1964),
- Tete Montoliu (1964),
- George Russell (1965),
- Kenny Drew (1965–68/75/86),
- Wayne Shorter (1966, 2007, 2012),
- Charles Lloyd (1966),
- Don Byas (1966),
- Jack DeJohnette (1966/77/81/86/97/2006),
- J. J. Johnson (1966),
- Keith Jarrett (1966, 1972, 1973, 1986),
- Roland Kirk (1967),
- Ben Webster (1967/69),
- Freddie Hubbard (1967/84/92),
- Phil Woods (1968/69/72/79/98),
- Don Cherry (1968/79/82/84/87),
- Joe Henderson (1968/84),
- Clark Terry (1971/73/99),
- Herbie Hancock (1971/88/97/98, 2002/10),
- Weather Report/Joe Zawinul (1971/89/99),
- Chick Corea (1972, 2000/07)
- Ralph Towner (1973/75/77/78),
- Eubie Blake (1973),
- Gary Burton (1974, 2002/07/10),
- Wallace Davenport (1975/77/78),
- McCoy Tyner (1975/96/2006),
- Max Roach (1977/83),
- Carla Bley (1978/93/99),
- Bill Evans trio incl. Marc Johnson & Joe LaBarbera (1980),
- Lester Bowie (1982/89–92/95),
- Art Blakey (1983/90),
- Jaco Pastorius (1983),
- Stéphane Grappelli (1984),
- Miles Davis (1984/85),
- John Scofield (1984–87, 89–90, 92/95/97/99, 2006, 2012),
- Modern Jazz Quartet (1985),
- Oscar Peterson/The Manhattan Transfer (1987),
- Ornette Coleman (1987, 2008),
- Dizzy Gillespie (1989),
- Terri Lyne Carrington (1990, 2011)
- Al Jarreau (1996),
- Marcus Miller (1996/97, 2013/19)
- Milt Jackson (1998),
- Dee Dee Bridgewater (1999, 2015)
- Pat Metheny (2001/16/17),
- Dianne Reeves (2003/11),
- Branford Marsalis (2004, 2016),
- Joshua Redman (2006/09/15/16/19),
- Bobby McFerrin (2010),
- Sonny Rollins (2010),
- John McLaughlin (2011),
- Joe Lovano (2012)
- Ron Carter (2016)
- David Sanborn (2018)
