= Basie's Beat =

Studio album by Count Basie Orchestra
- Released: 1967
- Recorded: Oct 7, 8 & 9, 1965 and February 15, 1967
- Studio: A & R (New York City)
- Genre: Jazz, swing, big band
- Length: 36:24
- Label: Verve
- Producer: Teddy Reig

Count Basie Orchestra chronology
Hollywood...Basie's Way (1967)	Basie's Beat (1967)	Basie's in the Bag (1967)

Basie's Beat is a 1967 album by Count Basie and his orchestra.

The trombonist Richard Boone sings on two of the tracks, "Boone's Blues" and "I Got Rhythm".

== Track listing ==
1. "It's Only a Paper Moon" (Harold Arlen, E.Y. "Yip" Harburg, Billy Rose) – 2:43
2. "Squeeze Me" (Fats Waller, Clarence Williams) – 4:56
3. "St. Louis Blues" (W. C. Handy) – 5:26
4. "I Got Rhythm" (George Gershwin, Ira Gershwin) – 2:37
5. "Frankie and Johnny" (Traditional) – 3:43
6. "Boone's Blues" (Richard Boone) – 2:50
7. "St. Thomas" (Sonny Rollins) – 3:06
8. "Hey Jim" – 4:10
9. "Happy House" – 4:23
10. "Makin' Whoopee" (Walter Donaldson, Gus Kahn) – 5:09

== Personnel ==
- The Count Basie Orchestra
- Count Basie – piano, arranger
- Richard Boone – vocals, trombone
- Bobby Plater, Marshall Royal – alto saxophone
- Charlie Fowlkes – baritone saxophone
- Norman Keenan – double bass
- Ed Shaughnessy, Rufus Jones – drums
- Freddie Green – guitar
- Billy Mitchell, Eddie "Lockjaw" Davis, Eric Dixon, Marshall Brown – tenor saxophone
- Al Grey, Grover Mitchell, Harlan Floyd, Henderson Chambers – trombone
- Bill Hughes – bass trombone
- Al Aarons, Gene Goe, Harry "Sweets" Edison, Phil Guilbeau, Sonny Cohn, Wallace Davenport – trumpet

Production

- Acy R. Lehman – cover design
- Phil Ramone, Bob Arnold – engineer
- Val Valentin – director of engineering
- Stanley Dance – liner notes
- Chuck Stewart – photography
- Teddy Reig – producer
