= Broadway Basie's...Way =

Studio album by Count Basie and His Orchestra
- Released: 1966
- Recorded: August 18 and September 7 & 8, 1966; Finesound Studio, New York
- Genre: Jazz
- Label: Command; R 33 905/RS 905 SD
- Producer: Loren Becker, Robert Byrne and Teddy Reig

Count Basie chronology
Basie Swingin' Voices Singin' (1966)	Broadway Basie's...Way (1966)	Hollywood...Basie's Way (1967)

Broadway Basie's...Way is an album by pianist and bandleader Count Basie and His Orchestra featuring performances of Broadway musical songs recorded in 1966 and released on the Command label.

The album peaked at No. 143 on the Billboard Top LP's, remaining on the chart for one more week.

== Reception ==
Professional ratings
Review scores
Source	Rating
AllMusic	2/5 stars
The Rolling Stone Jazz Record Guide	2/5 stars

AllMusic awarded the album 2 stars stating "On this often unlistenable set, the Count Basie Orchestra plays unimaginative arrangements of a dozen Broadway show tunes".

== Track listing ==
1. "Hello Young Lovers" (Richard Rodgers, Oscar Hammerstein II) - 2:05
2. "A Lot of Livin' to Do" (Charles Strouse, Lee Adams) - 3:01
3. "Just in Time" (Jule Styne, Betty Comden, Adolph Green) - 3:06
4. "Mame" (Jerry Herman) - 3:14
5. "On A Clear Day (You Can See Forever)" (Burton Lane, Alan Jay Lerner) - 2:42
6. "It's All Right With Me" (Cole Porter) - 2:35
7. "On the Street Where You Live" (Frederick Loewe, Lerner) - 2:48
8. "Here's That Rainy Day" (Jimmy Van Heusen, Johnny Burke) - 3:22
9. "From This Moment On" (Porter) - 2:40
10. "Baubles, Bangles, & Beads" (George Forrest, Robert Wright) - 3:01
11. "People" (Styne, Bob Merrill) - 2:33
12. "Everything's Coming up Roses" (Styne, Stephen Sondheim) - 3:10
- Recorded at Finesound Studios in New York on August 18, 1966 (tracks 1, 3, 5 & 7), September 7, 1966 (track 4) and September 8, 1966 (tracks 2, 6 & 8–12)

== Personnel ==
- Count Basie - piano
- Al Aarons, Sonny Cohn, Roy Eldridge, Gene Goe - trumpet
- Richard Boone, Harlan Floyd, Grover Mitchell - trombone
- Bill Hughes - bass trombone
- Bobby Plater - alto saxophone, flute
- Marshal Royal - alto saxophone, clarinet
- Eric Dixon - tenor saxophone, flute
- Eddie "Lockjaw" Davis - tenor saxophone
- Charlie Fowlkes - baritone saxophone
- Freddie Green - guitar
- Norman Keenan - bass
- Ed Shaughnessy - drums
- Chico O'Farrill - arranger

== Charts ==
Chart (1966)	Peak position
US Billboard Top LPs	143
