= Basie Straight Ahead =

Studio album by Count Basie and Orchestra
- Released: 1968
- Recorded: September 1968
- Studio: TTG (Los Angeles)
- Genre: Swing; Big band
- Label: Dot
- Producer: Tom Mack and Teddy Reig

Count Basie and Orchestra chronology
The Board of Directors Annual Report (1968)	Basie Straight Ahead (1968)	How About This (1968)

Professional ratings
Review scores
Source	Rating
AllMusic	3/5 stars
The Rolling Stone Jazz Record Guide	2/5 stars
Penguin Guide to Jazz Recordings	3/5 stars

Basie Straight Ahead is an album recorded at TTG Studios, Hollywood, California in October 1968 featuring Count Basie and his orchestra. This album marked the first collaboration between Basie and his long-time orchestrator, Sammy Nestico, who composed, arranged and conducted all of the songs on the record. The engineers were Ami Hadani and Thorne Nogar, and the producers were Tom Mack and Teddy Reig. The disc was issued in 1968 on Dot label and on English EMI.

== Track listing ==
_{All tracks by Sammy Nestico}

1. "Basie - Straight Ahead" – 3:56
2. "It's Oh, So Nice" – 4:10
3. "Lonely Street" – 2:53
4. "Fun Time" – 3:52
5. "Magic Flea" – 3:09
6. "Switch In Time" – 3:58
7. "Hay Burner" – 4:16
8. "That Warm Feeling" – 3:33
9. "The Queen Bee" – 4:13

== Personnel ==
- Count Basie – piano, Hammond organ
- Sonny Cohn, Gene Coe, Oscar Brashear, Al Aarons – trumpet
- Grover Mitchell, Richard Boone, Bill Hughes, Steve Galloway – trombone
- Marshal Royal – alto saxophone
- Bobby Plater – alto saxophone, flute
- Eddie "Lockjaw" Davis – tenor saxophone
- Eric Dixon – tenor saxophone, flute
- Charlie Fowlkes – baritone saxophone
- Freddie Green – guitar
- Norman Keenan – double bass
- Harold Jones – drums
- Sammy Nestico – piano (on "That Warm Feeling")
