= Count Basie Orchestra =

American big band

The Count Basie Orchestra
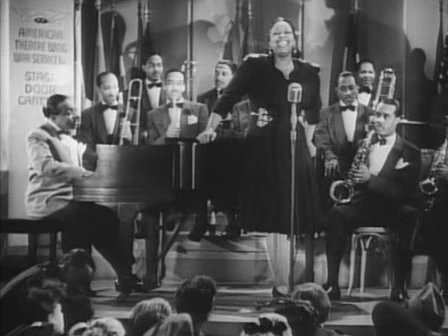
- The Count Basie Orchestra with vocalist Ethel Waters from the film Stage Door Canteen (1943)

Background information
- Origin: Kansas City, Missouri, U.S.
- Genres: Jazz, big band, swing
- Years active: 1935–present
- Website: thecountbasieorchestra.com

The Count Basie Orchestra is a 16- to 18-piece big band, one of the most prominent jazz performing groups of the swing era, founded by Count Basie in 1935 and recording regularly from 1936. Despite a brief disbandment at the beginning of the 1950s, the band has survived long past the big band era itself and the death of Basie in 1984. It continues under the direction of trumpeter Scotty Barnhart.

Originally including such musicians as Buck Clayton and Lester Young in the line-up, the band in the 1950s and 1960s made use of the work of the arrangers Neal Hefti and Sammy Nestico with featured musicians such as Thad Jones and Eddie "Lockjaw" Davis.

== History ==
=== Early years ===
Count Basie arrived in Kansas City, Missouri in 1927, playing on the Theater Owners Booking Association (TOBA) circuit. After playing with Walter Page's Blue Devils, in 1929 he joined rival band leader Bennie Moten's band.

Upon Moten's death in 1935, Basie left the group to start his own band, taking many of his colleagues from the Moten band with him. This nine-piece group was known for its legendary soloists, including Joe Keyes and Oran 'Hot Lips' Page on trumpet, Buster Smith and Earle Warren on alto saxophone, Lester Young on tenor saxophone, Dan Minor on trombone, and a rhythm section made up of Jo Jones on drums, Walter Page on bass and Basie on piano. With this band, then named The Barons of Rhythm, Basie brought the sound of the famous and highly competitive Kansas City "jam session" to club audiences, coupling extended improvised solos with riff-based accompaniments from the band. The group's first venue was the Reno Club in Kansas City.

When music critic and record producer John Hammond heard the band on a 1936 radio broadcast, he sought them out and offered Basie the chance to expand the group to the standard 13-piece big band line-up. He also offered to transfer the group to New York City in order to play at venues such as the Roseland Ballroom. Basie agreed, hoping that with this new band, he could retain the freedom and spirit of the Kansas City style of his nine-piece group.

The band, which now included Buck Clayton on trumpet and the famous blues "shouter" Jimmy Rushing, demonstrated this style in their first recordings with the Decca label in January 1937: in pieces such as "Roseland Shuffle", the soloists are at the foreground, with the ensemble effects and riffs playing a strictly functional backing role. This was a fresh big band sound for New York, contrasting the complex jazz writing of Duke Ellington and Sy Oliver and highlighting the difference in styles that had emerged between the east and west coasts.

=== New York City ===
Following the first recording session, the band's line up was reshuffled, with some of players being replaced on the request of Hammond as part of a strengthening of the band. Trumpeters Ed Lewis and Bobby Moore replaced Keyes and Smith, and Earle Warren replaced the alto saxophonist Coughey Roberts. In March 1937 the guitarist Freddie Green arrived, replacing Claude Williams and completing what became one of the most respected rhythm sections in big band history. Billie Holiday also sang with the band during this period, although she never recorded with them for contractual reasons.

Hits such as "One O'Clock Jump" and "Jumpin' at the Woodside" (from 1937 and 1938, respectively) helped to gain the band, now known as the Count Basie Orchestra, national and international fame. These tunes were known as "head-arrangements"; not scored in individual parts but made up of riffs memorized by the band's members. Although some of the band's players, such as trombonist Eddie Durham, contributed their own written arrangements at this time, the "head-arrangements" captured the imagination of the audience in New York and communicated the spirit of the band's members.

In 1938, Helen Humes joined the group, replacing Billie Holiday as the female singer. She sang mostly pop ballads, including "My Heart Belongs to Daddy" and "Blame it on My Last Affair", acting as a gentle contrast to the blues style of Jimmy Rushing.

=== 1940s ===
The band became increasingly dependent on arrangers to provide its music. These varied from players within the band, such as Eddie Durham and Buck Clayton, to professional arrangers from outside the group, who could bring their own character to the band with each new piece. External arranger Andy Gibson brought the band's harmonic style closer to the music of Thomas Tapley, with arrangements from 1940 such as "I Never Knew" and "Louisiana" introducing increased chromaticism to the band's music. Tab Smith contributed important arrangements at this time, such as "Harvard Blues", and others including Buster Harding and veteran arranger Jimmy Mundy also expanded the group's repertoire. Thelma Carpenter replaced Helen Humes as the new female vocalist, notably recording "I Didn't Know About You" for Columbia Records.

But the many new arrangements led to a gradual change in the band's sound, distancing the group musically from its Kansas City roots. Rather than the music being built around the soloists with memorised head arrangements and riffs, the group's sound at this time became more focused on ensemble playing; closer to the East Coast big band sound. This can be attributed to the increasing reliance on arrangers to influence the band with their music. It suggested that Basie's ideal of a big band-sized group with the flexibility and spirit of his original Kansas City eight-piece was not to last.

During the World War II years, some of the key members of the band left: the drummer Jo Jones and tenor saxophone player Lester Young were both conscripted in 1944, leading to the hiring of drummers such as Buddy Rich and extra tenor saxophonists, including Illinois Jacquet, Paul Gonsalves and Lucky Thompson. The musicologist Gunther Schuller has said that when Jo Jones left, he took some of the smooth, relaxed style of the band with him. Replacements such as Sonny Payne, who joined Basie’s “Second Testament” band in late 1954, drummed much louder and raised the dynamic of the band to a "harder, more clamorous brass sound." The ban on instrumental recordings of 1942–1944 adversely affected the finances of the Count Basie Orchestra, as it did for all big bands in the United States. Despite taking on soloists from the next generation such as Wardell Gray, Basie was forced to temporarily disband the group for a short period in 1948, before dispersing again for two years in 1950. For these two years, Basie led a reduced band of between six and nine people, featuring performers such as Buddy Rich, Serge Chaloff and Buddy DeFranco.

=== The "Second Testament" ===
Basie reformed the jazz orchestra in 1952 for a series of tours, not only in the United States, but also in Europe in 1954 and Japan in 1963. The band released new recordings, some featuring guest singers such as Joe Williams, Frank Sinatra, Ella Fitzgerald and Billy Eckstine. All relied on contributions from arrangers, some of whom are now synonymous with the Basie band: Neal Hefti, Quincy Jones and Sammy Nestico. Michael G. Nastos wrote of the recording with Eckstine:

"When the Count Basie Orchestra consented to team up with vocalist Billy Eckstine, choruses of angels must have shouted hallelujah. The combination of Basie's sweet jazz and Eckstine's low-down blues sensibilities meshed well on this one-shot deal, a program mostly of downtrodden songs perfectly suited for the band and the man."

This new band became known as "The New Testament" or "The Second Testament". With albums such as The Atomic Mr. Basie (1958), April in Paris (1957) and Basie Plays Hefti (1958), the new Count Basie Orchestra sound became identifiable. The sound of the band was now that of a tight ensemble: heavier and more full bodied, contrasting with the riff-based band of the late 1930s and early 1940s. Whereas previously the emphasis had been on providing space for exemplary soloists such as Lester Young and Buck Clayton, now the focus had shifted to the arrangements, despite the presence of soloists such as trumpeter Thad Jones and saxophonist Frank Foster. This orchestral style continues as the typical sound of the band up to the present day, which has been criticized by some musicologists. In his book The Swing Era, Gunther Schuller described the group as "perfected neo-classicism...a most glorious dead end." However, jazz critic Martin Williams offers a differing view. In his book Jazz Heritage, Williams wrote the following about a 1959 recording: " . . . obviously this Basie orchestra is an ensemble whose virtues center on discipline, precision, and collective power." In his book The Jazz Tradition, Williams wrote:

"Since the mid-'fifties, the Count Basie Orchestra has been a superb precision ensemble, and perhaps the greatest brass ensemble of the century. And that fact adds an irony to a distinguished career, for it was not always such."

=== Continuing band ===
The Count Basie Orchestra continued releasing recordings and albums after Basie's death in 1984. For example, Basie is Back (2006) features new recordings of classic tunes from the Basie Orchestra's catalog, including "April in Paris" and the band's early hit "One O'Clock Jump". The Basie band still collaborated with high-profile singers such as Ray Charles on Ray Sings, Basie Swings (2006), and with arranger Allyn Ferguson on the album Swing Shift (1999). After Basie's death the band played under the direction of some of the players he had hired, including Thad Jones, Frank Foster, Grover Mitchell, Bill Hughes, and Dennis Mackrel. The band is currently under the direction of trumpeter Scotty Barnhart.

== Leaders of the Count Basie Orchestra ==
- Count Basie 1935–1984
- Thad Jones 1985–1986
- Frank Foster 1986–1995
- Grover Mitchell 1995–2003
- Bill Hughes 2003–Sept. 2010
- Dennis Mackrel 2010–2013
- Scotty Barnhart 2013–present

== Awards and honors ==
- 2026- Grammy Award nomination for the album Basie Rocks in the Best Large Jazz Ensemble Album category.
- 2024 - Grammy Award for Best Large Ensemble Jazz Album, Basie Swings the Blues
- 2007- Long Island Music Hall of Fame
- 2005- Inducted, Nesuhi Ertegun Jazz Hall of Fame
- 2002 Lifetime Achievement Award
- 1984- Best Jazz Instrumental Performance Big Band 88 Basie Street
- 1983- Winner NEA Jazz Masters
- 1982- Best Jazz Instrumental Performance, Big Band Warm Breeze
- 1981- National Trustees Award
- 1981- Honoree, Kennedy Center Awards
- 1981- Honoree, Hollywood Walk of Fame
- 1980- Best Jazz Instrumental Performance, Big Band On The Road
- 1977- Best Jazz Performance By a Big Band Prime Time
- 1976- Best Jazz Performance by a Soloist (Instrumental) Basie and Zoot
- 1970- Initiated in Phi Mu Alpha Sinfonia
- 1963- Best Performance by an Orchestra- For Dancing This Time By Basie! Hits of the 50s and 60s
- 1960- Best Performance by a Band for Dancing Dance With Basie
- 1958- Best Performance by a Dance Band- Basie (The Atomic Mr. Basie)
- 1958- Best Jazz Performance, Group- Basie (The Atomic Mr. Basie)

== Discography ==
For recordings by Count Basie without his big band, see Count Basie discography.

=== 1937–1939, Brunswick and Decca labels ===
- The Original American Decca Recordings (1937–1939, GRP-Decca)

=== 1939–1950, Columbia and RCA labels ===
- Super Chief (1936–1942, Columbia)
- The Complete Count Basie, Volumes 1-10 (1936–1941, CBS)
- The Complete Count Basie, Volumes 11-20 (1941–1951, CBS)
- Count Basie, Volume 1: The Count and the President (1936–1939, CBS)
- Count Basie, Volume 2: Lester Leaps In (1939–1940, CBS)
- Count Basie, Volume 3: Don for Prez (1940–1941, CBS)
- Count Basie, Volume 4: One O'Clock Jump (1941–1942, CBS)
- Count Basie, Volume 5: Avenue C (1942, 1945–46, CBS)
- Count Basie, Volume 6: The Orchestra and the Octet (1946, 1950–51, CBS)
- Count Basie and His Great Vocalists (1939–1945, Columbia)
- America's No. 1 Band: The Columbia Years (1936–1964, Columbia) 4-CD
- Complete Original American Victor Recordings (1941–1950, RCA sessions, reissued on Definitive)
- Kansas City Powerhouse (1929–1932, 1947–1949, RCA/Bluebird)
- Planet Jazz (1929–1932, 1947–1949, RCA/BMG)

=== 1950s ===
- The Count! (1952 [1955], Clef)
- Basie Jazz (1952 [1954], Clef)
- Basie Rides Again! (1952 [1956], Clef) contains some tracks released on Basie Jazz
- The Swinging Count! (1953 [1956], Clef) contains some tracks released on Basie Jazz
- Dance Session (1953, Clef)
- Dance Session Album #2 (1952–1954, Clef)
- The Complete Roost Recordings (1954, Roost) - Stan Getz box-set with Getz guesting with Basie on a three tracks at the end of the set.
- King of Swing (1953–1954 [1956], Clef) contains tracks released on Dance Session and Dance Session Album #2
- Basie Roars Again (1953–1954 [1956], Clef) contains tracks released on Dance Session and Dance Session Album #2
- Basie (1955, Clef) reissued as The Band of Distinction (1956, Verve)
- Count Basie Swings, Joe Williams Sings with Joe Williams (1955, Clef)
- April in Paris (1955–1956, Verve)
- The Greatest!! Count Basie Plays, Joe Williams Sings Standards with Joe Williams (1956, Verve)
- Metronome All-Stars 1956 (1956, Clef) with Ella Fitzgerald and Joe Williams
- Hall of Fame (1956, Verve)
- Basie in London (live, 1956, Verve)
- One O'Clock Jump with Joe Williams and Ella Fitzgerald (1957, Verve)
- Count Basie at Newport (live, 1957, Verve)
- The Atomic Mr. Basie (1958, Roulette)
- Basie Plays Hefti (1958, Roulette)
- No Count Sarah with Sarah Vaughan (1958, EmArcy)
- Sing Along with Basie with Joe Williams and Lambert, Hendricks & Ross (1958, Roulette)
- Breakfast Dance and Barbecue (live, 1958, Roulette)
- Welcome to the Club with Nat King Cole (1959, Capitol)
- Basie One More Time (1959, Roulette)
- Basie/Eckstine Incorporated (with Billy Eckstine, 1959, Roulette)
- In Person! (with Tony Bennett, 1959, Columbia)
- Chairman of the Board (1959, Roulette)
- Strike Up the Band with Tony Bennett (1959, Roulette)
- Everyday I Have the Blues with Joe Williams (1959, Roulette)
- Dance Along with Basie (1959, Roulette)

=== 1960s ===
- I Gotta Right to Swing with Sammy Davis, Jr. (1960, Decca)
- Just the Blues with Joe Williams (1960, Roulette)
- The Count Basie Story (1960, Roulette)
- Not Now, I'll Tell You When (1960, Roulette)
- Kansas City Suite composed by Benny Carter (1960, Roulette)
- Count Basie/Sarah Vaughan with Sarah Vaughan (1961, Roulette)
- First Time! The Count Meets the Duke with Duke Ellington (1961, Columbia)
- The Legend composed by Benny Carter (1961, Roulette)
- Basie at Birdland (live, 1961, Roulette)
- Back with Basie (1962, Roulette)
- Easin' it (1962, Roulette)
- Basie in Sweden (live, 1962, Roulette)
- I Left My Heart in San Francisco with Tony Bennett (1962, Columbia)
- Sinatra-Basie: An Historic Musical First with Frank Sinatra (1962, Reprise)
- On My Way & Shoutin' Again! (1963, Verve)
- This Time by Basie! (1963, Reprise)
- More Hits of the 50's and 60's (1963, Verve)
- Li'l Ol' Groovemaker...Basie! (1963, Verve)
- Ella and Basie! with Ella Fitzgerald (1963, Verve)
- Basie Land (1964, Verve)
- It Might as Well Be Swing with Frank Sinatra (1964, Reprise)
- Pop Goes the Basie (1965, Reprise)
- Basie Picks the Winners (1965, Verve)
- Our Shining Hour with Sammy Davis, Jr. (1965, Verve)
- Arthur Prysock and Count Basie with Arthur Prysock (1965, Verve)
- Basie Meets Bond (1966, United Artists)
- Live at the Sands (Before Frank) (live, 1966 [1998], Reprise)
- Sinatra at the Sands with Frank Sinatra (live, 1966, Reprise)
- Basie's Beatle Bag (1966, Verve)
- Broadway Basie's...Way (1967, Command)
- Hollywood...Basie's Way (1967, Command)
- Basie's Beat (1967, Verve)
- Basie's in the Bag (1967, Brunswick)
- The Happiest Millionaire (1967, Coliseum)
- Half a Sixpence (1967, Dot)
- The Board of Directors with The Mills Brothers (1968, Dot)
- Manufacturers of Soul with Jackie Wilson (1968, Brunswick)
- The Board of Directors Annual Report with The Mills Brothers (1968, Dot)
- Basie Straight Ahead (1968, Dot)
- How About This with Kay Starr (1968, Paramount)
- Standing Ovation (live, 1969, Dot)
- Basic Basie (1969, MPS)
- Basie on the Beatles (1970, Happy Tiger)
- High Voltage (1970, MPS)
- Afrique (1971, Flying Dutchman)
- Have a Nice Day (1971, Daybreak)
- Bing 'n' Basie with Bing Crosby (1972, Daybreak)
- The Songs of Bessie Smith with Teresa Brewer (1973, Flying Dutchman)

=== Pablo years ===
- Good Time Blues (live, 1970)
- Flip, Flop & Fly with Big Joe Turner (live, 1972)
- Jazz at Santa Monica Civic '72 with Ella Fitzgerald (live, 1972)
- Fun Time (live, 1975)
- Basie Big Band (1975)
- I Told You So (1976)
- Prime Time (1977)
- Montreux '77 (live, 1977)
- Milt Jackson + Count Basie + The Big Band, Vol.1 (1978)
- Milt Jackson + Count Basie + The Big Band, Vol.2 (1978)
- Live in Japan '78 (live, 1978)
- A Classy Pair with Ella Fitzgerald (1979)
- On the Road (live, 1979)
- A Perfect Match with Ella Fitzgerald (live, 1979)
- Digital III at Montreux (live, 1979)
- Kansas City Shout with Big Joe Turner (1980)
- Send in the Clowns with Sarah Vaughan (1981)
- ‘’Warm Breeze’’ (1981)
- Farmer's Market Barbecue (1982)
- Me and You (1983)
- 88 Basie Street (1983)
- Fancy Pants (1983)

=== Post Count Basie albums ===
- Long Live the Chief (1986, Denon)
- Diane Schuur & the Count Basie Orchestra with Diane Schuur (live, 1987, GRP)
- Big Boss Band with George Benson (1990, Warner Bros.)
- The Legend, the Legacy (1990, Denon)
- Freddie Freeloader with Jon Hendricks (1990, Denon)
- Corner Pocket (live, 1992, LaserLight)
- The Count Basie Orchestra Live at El Morocco (live, 1992, Telarc)
- Joe Williams and the Count Basie Orchestra with Joe Williams (live, 1993, Telarc)
- Basie's Bag (live, 1994, Telarc)
- Jazzin' with Tito Puente and India (1996, RMM)
- Live at Manchester Craftsmen's Guild (live, 1996, Blue Jackel)
- At Long Last with Rosemary Clooney (1998, Concord Jazz)
- Count Plays Duke (1998, MAMA)
- Swing Shift (1999, MAMA)
- Basie is Back: Recorded Live in Japan (2006, Village Music/Eighty-Eight's/Concord)
- Ray Sings, Basie Swings with Ray Charles (2006, Concord)
- Sinatra: Vegas with Frank Sinatra (live, compilation) (2006, Reprise) 4-CD + DVD
- A Swingin' Christmas (Featuring The Count Basie Big Band) with Tony Bennett (2008, Columbia)
- Swinging, Singing, Playing (2009, Mack Avenue)
- A Very Swingin' Basie Christmas! (2015, Concord)
- All About That Basie (2018, Concord)
- Standing Room Only with Frank Sinatra (live, compilation, 2018, Capitol)
- Live at Birdland (2021, Candid) 2-CD
- Basie Swings the Blues (Candid, 2023)
- "Basie Rocks!" with Deborah Silver (Green Hill 2025)

== Other sources ==
- Atkins, Ronald, ed. (2000), Jazz: From New Orleans to the New Jazz Age. London: Carlton Books
- Stowe, David W. "Jazz in the West: Cultural Frontier and Region During the Swing Era", The Western Historical Quarterly, Vol. 23, No. 1. Utah: Utah State University, February 1992.
