= Count Basie and the Kansas City 7 =

Studio album by Count Basie
- Released: 1962
- Recorded: March 21–22, 1962
- Studio: Van Gelder (Englewood Cliffs, New Jersey)
- Genre: Jazz
- Length: 35:57
- Label: Impulse!
- Producer: Bob Thiele

Count Basie chronology
| The Legend (1961) | Count Basie and the Kansas City 7 (1962) | Easin' It (1962) |

Count Basie and the Kansas City 7 is an album by American jazz bandleader and pianist Count Basie featuring small group performances recorded in 1962 for the Impulse! label.

== Reception ==
Professional ratings
Review scores
| Source | Rating |
|---|---|
| AllMusic | 4/5 stars |
| DownBeat | 4.5/5 stars |
| New Record Mirror | 5/5 stars |
| The Penguin Guide to Jazz Recordings | 3/4 stars |
| The Rolling Stone Jazz Record Guide | 3/5 stars |

The AllMusic review by Scott Yanow stated, "One of Count Basie's few small-group sessions of the '60s was his best". In a contemporaneous review in the October 11, 1962, issue of DownBeat, Leonard Feather rated the album at 4.5 stars.

== Track listing ==
1. "Oh, Lady Be Good!" (George Gershwin, Ira Gershwin) – 4:40
2. "Secrets" (Frank Wess) – 4:08
3. "I Want a Little Girl" (Murray Mencher, Billy Moll) – 4:16
4. "Shoe Shine Boy" (Sammy Cahn, Saul Chaplin) – 4:07
5. "Count's Place" (Count Basie) – 5:28
6. "Senator Whitehead" (Wess) – 4:12
7. "Tally-Ho, Mr. Basie!" (Basie) – 4:28
8. "What'cha Talkin'?" (Thad Jones) – 4:59
- Recorded at Van Gelder Studio in Englewood Cliffs, New Jersey, on March 21, 1962 (tracks 2, 6 & 8), and March 22, 1962 (tracks 1, 3–5 & 7)

== Personnel ==
- Count Basie – piano, organ
- Thad Jones – trumpet
- Frank Wess – flute, alto flute (tracks 2, 6 & 8)
- Frank Foster – tenor saxophone, clarinet (tracks 1, 3–5 & 7)
- Eric Dixon – tenor saxophone, flute, clarinet
- Freddie Green – guitar
- Eddie Jones – bass
- Sonny Payne – drums

== Production ==
- Bob Thiele – producer
- Pete Turner – photography
