= Dave Stahl =

Jazz and big band trumpeter

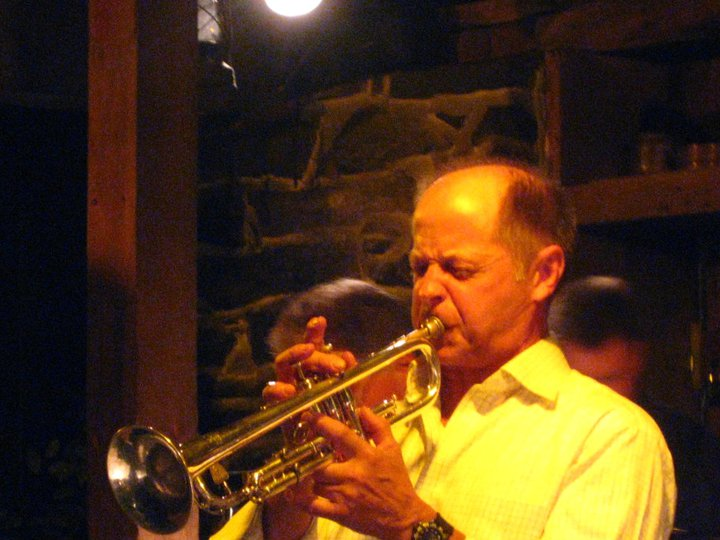
- Dave Stahl performing with his big band in Lebanon, PA in 2011

Background information
- Genres: Jazz, big band
- Occupation: Musician
- Instrument: Trumpet
- Years active: 1970-present
- Label: Abee Cake Records
- Website: www.davestahl.com

Dave Stahl (born January 23, 1949) is an American jazz and big band trumpeter, known mainly for his lead trumpet work with the bands of Buddy Rich, Woody Herman, and Liza Minnelli.

== Career ==
Born in Reading, Pennsylvania, Stahl studied trumpet with Walter Gier and attended Penn State University, graduating in 1970 with a degree in Music Education. From 1970 to 1973 he served in the U.S. Army, where he performed as a soloist with The Army Band, lead trumpet for the Army Blues and principal trumpet for the White House Herald Trumpets. After his discharge, he toured and recorded as lead trumpet with the bands of Woody Herman (1973-1975), Count Basie (1975), Buddy Rich (1977-1978), Liza Minnelli (1987-1999), Larry Elgart and Toshiko Akiyoshi. In addition, he played lead trumpet for the Broadway productions of Damn Yankees (1994-1995), and Saturday Night Fever (1999-2000), among other shows. In 1987 Stahl formed his own record label, Abee Cake Records, which records the work of both of his bands, the Dave Stahl Band and the Sacred Orchestra.

== Discography ==
=== As leader ===
- Anaconda (Abee Cake, 1987)
- Miranda (Abee Cake, 1988)
- Live at Knights (Abee Cake, 1989)
- Standard Issue (Abee Cake, 1991)
- Live at the Ritz (Abee Cake, 2005)
- From A to Z (Abee Cake, 2011)
- The Dave Stahl Band Collection, Volume One (Abee Cake, 2013)
- Workin' (Abee Cake, 2019)

With The Sacred Orchestra

- How Great Thou Art (Abee Cake, 2001)
- Praise Him (Abee Cake, 2002)

=== As sideman ===
With the United States Army Band

- The Army Blues (no label, 1971)

With Woody Herman

- Thundering Herd (Fantasy, 1974)
- Feelin' So Blue (Fantasy, 1981)
- Herd at Montreux (Fantasy, 1975)
- Children of Lima (Fantasy, 1975)
- King Cobra (Fantasy, 1976)

With Count Basie

- Basie Big Band (Pablo, 1975)
- Fun Time (Pablo, 1975)
- Kansas City Shout (Pablo, 1980)

With Buddy Rich

- Plays and Plays and Plays (RCA, 1977)
- Live in Poland '77 (Poljazz, 1977)
- Europe 77 (Magic, 1995)
- Wham! (Hyena, 2003)
- Time Out (Lightyear, 2007)
- Burning for Buddy, Volume 1 (Atlantic, 1994)
- Burning for Buddy, Volume 2 (Atlantic, 1997)

With Liza Minnelli

- At Carnegie Hall (Telarc, 1987)
- Live from Radio City Music Hall (Sony, 1992)
- Minnelli on Minnelli: Live at the Palace (Angel Records, 2000)

With Frank Sinatra

- The Main Event - Live (Reprise, 1974)

With Chaka Khan

- ClassiKhan (Sanctuary, 2004)

Broadway:

- Damn Yankees - 1994 Original Broadways Cast (Decca U.S., 1994)
- Dirty Rotten Scoundrels - 2005 Original Broadway Cast (Ghostlight, 2005)
- The Drowsy Chaperone - 2006 Original Broadway Cast (Ghostlight, 2006)
- Finian's Rainbow - 2009 Original Broadway Cast (PS Classics, 2009)
