= Live at the Sands (Before Frank) =

Live album by Count Basie and His Orchestra
- Released: 1998
- Recorded: January 26–29 and February 1, 1966; The Copa Room of the Sands Hotel and Casino in Las Vegas, NV
- Genre: Jazz
- Length: 53:00
- Label: Reprise; 9 45946-2
- Producer: Dana Watson, Matt Pierson and Sonny Burke

Count Basie chronology
| Basie Meets Bond (1965) | Live at the Sands (Before Frank) (1998) | Sinatra at the Sands (1966) |

Live at the Sands (Before Frank) is a live album by the pianist and bandleader Count Basie with performances recorded in Las Vegas in 1966 at the same concerts that produced Frank Sinatra's 1966 album Sinatra at the Sands. It was released on the Reprise label in 1998. The album is of the warm-up sets by Basie's band before Sinatra's performances.

== Reception ==
Professional ratings
Review scores
| Source | Rating |
|---|---|
| AllMusic | 3/5 stars |

AllMusic awarded the album 3 stars stating "this is overall a legendary band doing a somewhat less-than-legendary set, during some gigs that, in fairness, yielded up a great live album elsewhere. The quality is solid live sound, in crisp stereo from a nicely controlled mid-'60s venue, using state-of-the-art equipment". On All About Jazz, Ed Kopp noted, "The mid-'60s are regarded as a creative low point for the Count Basie Orchestra, but this live recording proves that the Basie band was as stylish and swingin' as ever in 1966, though fewer folks were paying attention."

== Track listing ==
1. Introduction – 0:48
2. "Splanky" (Neal Hefti) – 3:52
3. "I Can't Stop Loving You" (Don Gibson) – 3:41
4. "I Needs to Be Bee'd With" (Quincy Jones, Ernest Shelby) – 3:52
5. "Flight of the Foo Birds" (Hefti) – 3:08
6. "Satin Doll" (Duke Ellington, Billy Strayhorn, Johnny Mercer) – 4:10
7. "Makin' Whoopee!" (Walter Donaldson, Gus Kahn) – 4:11
8. "Corner Pocket" (Freddie Green) – 5:33
9. "One O'Clock Jump" (Count Basie) – 2:18
10. "Go Away Little Girl" (Gerry Goffin, Carole King) – 3:30
11. "Whirly Bird" (Hefti) – 5:11
12. "Blues for Ilene" (Eric Dixon) – 6:03
13. "This Could Be the Start of Something Big" (Steve Allen) – 3:10
14. "Jumpin' at the Woodside" (Andrew York) – 3:33

== Personnel ==
- Count Basie – piano
- Al Aarons, Sonny Cohn, Wallace Davenport, Phil Guilbeau, Harry Edison – trumpet
- Al Grey, Henderson Chambers, Grover Mitchell – trombone
- Bill Hughes – bass trombone
- Marshal Royal – alto saxophone, clarinet
- Bobby Plater – alto saxophone, flute
- Eric Dixon – tenor saxophone, flute
- Eddie "Lockjaw" Davis – tenor saxophone
- Charlie Fowlkes – baritone saxophone
- Freddie Green – guitar
- Norman Keenan – double bass
- Sonny Payne – drums
- Quincy Jones – arranger, conducting
