= Basic Basie =

Studio album by Count Basie and His Orchestra
- Released: 1969
- Recorded: October 20, 1969
- Studio: Universal (Chicago)
- Genre: Jazz
- Length: 33:08
- Label: MPS; MPS 15 264
- Producer: Sonny Lester

Count Basie chronology
Standing Ovation (1969)	Basic Basie (1969)	Basie on the Beatles (1969)

Evergreens Cover

Basic Basie is an album by pianist and bandleader Count Basie featuring performances recorded in Chicago in 1969 and released on the MPS label. It was released in the U.S. in 1972 on the Groove Merchant label as Evergreens.

== Reception ==
Professional ratings
Review scores
Source	Rating
AllMusic	2/5 stars

AllMusic awarded the album 2 stars.

== Track listing ==
1. "Idaho" (Jesse Stone) - 2:19
2. "Blues in My Heart" (Benny Carter, Irving Mills) - 2:53
3. "I Don't Stand a Ghost of a Chance with You" (Victor Young, Ned Washington, Bing Crosby) - 3:55
4. "Red Roses for a Blue Lady" (Sid Tepper, Roy C. Bennett) - 2:52
5. "Moonglow" (Will Hudson, Mills, Eddie DeLange) - 2:56
6. "Ma! He's Making Eyes at Me" (Con Conrad, Sidney Clare) - 2:16
7. "M-Squad" (Count Basie) - 2:18
8. "Sweet Lorraine" (Cliff Burwell, Mitchell Parish) - 3:27
9. "Ain't Misbehavin'" (Fats Waller, Harry Brooks. Andy Razaf) - 2:36
10. "Don't Worry 'bout Me" (Rube Bloom, Ted Koehler) - 2:56
11. "As Long as I Live" (Harold Arlen, Koehler) - 2:48
12. "I've Got the World on a String" (Arlen, Koehler) - 2:47

== Personnel ==
- Count Basie - piano
- Oscar Brashear, Gene Coe, Sonny Cohn, Waymon Reed - trumpet
- Frank Hooks, Grover Mitchell, Mel Wanzo - trombone
- Bill Hughes - bass trombone
- Marshal Royal, Bobby Plater - alto saxophone
- Eric Dixon, Eddie "Lockjaw" Davis - tenor saxophone
- Charlie Fowlkes - baritone saxophone
- Freddie Green - guitar
- Norman Keenan - bass
- Harold Jones - drums
- Chico O'Farrill - arranger
