= Richard B. Boone =

American jazz trombonist and singer

- Birth name: Richard Bently Boone
- Born: February 24, 1930 Little Rock, Arkansas, U.S.
- Died: February 8, 1999 (aged 68) Copenhagen, Denmark
- Genres: Jazz
- Occupation: Musician
- Instrument: Trombone
- Years active: 1950s–1990s
- Labels: Nocturne, Polydor, Storyville

Richard Bently Boone (February 24, 1930 – February 8, 1999) was an American jazz trombonist and scat singer.

== Career ==
Born in Little Rock, Arkansas, Boone sang in a Baptist church choir as a boy, then began playing the trombone at the age of twelve. He served with the U.S. Army from 1948 to 1953 where he played trombone in a military band. Out of the Army, he returned to Little Rock to study music at Philander Smith College. In 1956 Boone moved to Los Angeles where he played in venues with Dolo Coker, Sonny Criss, and Dexter Gordon. Boone worked in the backup band for Della Reese between 1962 and 1966 then became a member of the Count Basie band. A few years later he left Basie and moved to Copenhagen, Denmark, performing with the Ernie Wilkins Big Band.

== Discography ==
=== As leader ===
- I've Got a Right to Sing (Nocturne, 1968)
- Make Someone Happy with Bent Jaedig (Polydor, 1977)
- Brief Encounter (Metronome, 1978)
- Swingin' in Helsingborg with Al Grey (Four Leaf, 1991)
- A Tribute to Love (Stunt, 1998)

=== As sideman ===
With Count Basie

- Hollywood...Basie's Way (Command, 1966)
- Broadway Basie's...Way (Command, 1966)
- Basie's in the Bag (Brunswick, 1967)
- Half a Sixpence (Dot, 1967)
- The Board of Directors (Dot, 1967)
- The Board of Directors Annual Report (Dot, 1968) with The Mills Brothers
- Basie Straight Ahead (Dot, 1968)
- Standing Ovation (Dot, 1969)
- Basie's Beat (Verve, 1967)
- The Happiest Millionaire (Coliseum, 1967)
- Manufacturers of Soul with Jackie Wilson (Brunswick, 1968)
- How About This with Kay Starr (Paramount, 1968)

With Dexter Gordon

- The Resurgence of Dexter Gordon (Jazzland, 1960)
- More Than You Know (SteepleChase, 1975)

With Thad Jones

- By Jones I Think We've Got It (Metronome, 1978)
- Eclipse (Metronome, 1980)
- A Good Time Was Had by All (Storyville, 1989)

With Ernie Wilkins

- Ernie Wilkins and the Almost Big Band (Storyville, 1981
- Live! At Slukefter Jazz Club in Tivoli Gardens Copenhagen (Matrix, 1982)
- Montreux (SteepleChase, 1984)
- On the Roll (SteepleChase, 1987)
