= Count Basie Jam Session at the Montreux Jazz Festival 1975 =

Live album by Count Basie
- Released: 1975
- Recorded: July 19, 1975
- Venue: Montreux Jazz Festival, Switzerland
- Genre: Jazz
- Length: 45:31
- Label: Pablo; 2310 750
- Producer: Norman Granz

Count Basie chronology
Fun Time (1975)	Count Basie Jam Session at the Montreux Jazz Festival 1975 (1975)	Basie Big Band (1975)

Count Basie Jam Session at the Montreux Jazz Festival 1975, also referred to as Basie Jam, is a live album by pianist/bandleader Count Basie recorded in 1975 and released by the Pablo label.

== Reception ==
Professional ratings
Review scores
Source	Rating
AllMusic	3/5 stars
The Penguin Guide to Jazz Recordings	2/4 stars

The AllMusic review stated "This truly all-star session finds Basie stepping outside the traditional big band context to stretch out with a few close friends ... finger-popping grooves".

== Track listing ==
1. "Billie's Bounce" (Charlie Parker) – 14:39
2. "Festival Blues" (Count Basie, Milt Jackson, Johnny Griffin, Roy Eldridge, Niels Pedersen, Louie Bellson) – 11:58
3. "Lester Leaps In" (Lester Young) – 16:25

== Personnel ==
- Count Basie – piano
- Roy Eldridge – trumpet
- Johnny Griffin – tenor saxophone
- Milt Jackson – vibraphone
- Niels Pedersen – bass
- Louis Bellson – drums
