= How About This =

Studio album by Kay Starr and Count Basie
- Released: January 1969
- Recorded: December 1968
- Genre: Jazz
- Length: 31:11
- Labels: Paramount Records; PAS 5001
- Producers: Dick Peirce, Teddy Reig and Tom Mack

Count Basie chronology
| Basie Straight Ahead (1968) | How About This (1969) | Standing Ovation (1969) |

How About This is an album by vocalist Kay Starr and pianist and bandleader Count Basie, released in 1969 by the Paramount Records label.

== Background ==
In the 1960s, Basie had previously recorded for Roulette Records, Reprise, and Verve, before recording single albums for a number of labels, including Paramount. In December 1968, he recorded How About This with Starr; Dick Hyman was responsible for the arrangements.

Starr's vocal performance was likened to that of Dinah Washington.

== Reception ==
Professional ratings
Review scores
| Source | Rating |
|---|---|
| AllMusic | 4.5/5 stars |

The album was given a positive review from Cashbox magazine following its original release. Putting the album in its "Jazz Picks" section, the publication stated that "Two greats of the jazz world, singer Kay Starr and band leader and pianist Count Basie, join forces on this set to perform a program of jazz and blues evergreens," adding that the "results are electric." They believed that Starr's voice "has never sounded better, and Basie and his orchestra are at the top of their form," calling it an "Excellent package." AllMusic awarded the album 4½ stars.

== Track listing ==
1. "I Get the Blues When It Rains" (Marcy Klauber, Harry Stoddard) – 3:04
2. "God Bless the Child" (Arthur Herzog, Jr., Billie Holiday) – 3:02
3. "Baby Won't You Please Come Home" (Charles Warfield, Clarence Williams) – 2:48
4. "Ain't No Use" (Leroy Kirkland, Sidney Wyche) – 2:46
5. "Keep Smiling at Trouble (Trouble's a Bubble)" (Buddy DeSylva, Lewis Gensler, Al Jolson) – 1:58
6. "If I Could Be with You" (James P. Johnson, Henry Creamer) – 2:41
7. "My Man" (Jacques Charles, Channing Pollock, Albert Willemetz, Maurice Yvain) – 2:46
8. "Hallelujah I Love Him So" (Ray Charles) – 2:59
9. "I Can't Stop Loving You" (Don Gibson) – 3:07
10. "Goodtime Girl" (Scott Davis) – 3:00
11. "A Cottage for Sale" (Willard Robison, Larry Conley) – 3:00

== Personnel ==
Adapted from All About Jazz and album liner notes.

- Kay Starr – vocals
- Count Basie – piano
- Al Aarons, Oscar Brashear, Gene Coe, Sonny Cohn – trumpet
- Richard Boone, Steve Galloway, Grover Mitchell – trombone
- Bill Hughes – bass trombone
- Bobby Plater – alto saxophone, flute
- Marshal Royal – alto saxophone, clarinet
- Eric Dixon – tenor saxophone, flute
- Eddie "Lockjaw" Davis – tenor saxophone
- Charlie Fowlkes – baritone saxophone
- Freddie Green – guitar
- Norman Keenan – bass
- Harold Jones – drums
- Dick Hyman – arranger, conductor
