= Gordon Thomas (outsider musician) =

American jazz musician (1916–??)

Gordon Thomas (born 1916 in Bermuda) was a jazz trombonist.

== Career ==
His family immigrated to New York when Thomas was three. For a brief time in the 1940s he played trombone in Dizzy Gillespie's band until more skilled musicians returned home after completing their military service in World War II. "When the better musicians came back, that was it for my music career," Thomas told the Toronto Star in 2003. "I wasn't as good as those top-notch guys. So I took a lot of different jobs, looking after people's houses and such. I didn't start making my music again until the 1960s, but I haven't stopped since then."

Thomas recorded independently for 40 years, often giving away the albums as gifts. Duplicate cassette tapes of his songs began to circulate among collectors of "outsider music." Very little was known about the singer. When friends of filmmakers DeWolfe and Fraser played a tape for them in 2001, they decided to search for information about Thomas and to document their quest on film. After a year-long effort, they tracked him down "almost by accident," Fraser told Bermuda's Royal Gazette newspaper in 2005. "Somebody gave us a cassette that Gordon had made and it was pretty recent. That's when we realized he was still alive," Fraser said. "The cassette had the phone number of a studio. We'd just got back from shooting and, on a lark, I decided to phone the studio and see if they knew anything. Gordon was actually there."

With their search ended, DeWolfe and Fraser decided to focus their documentary on Thomas' life. Everything's Coming My Way: The Life and Music of Gordon Thomas debuted at the Bermuda International Film Festival in March 2005.

Thomas died on January 25, 2016, at the age of 99. DeWolfe and Fraser posted their documentary online in his honor.

In his 2000 book Songs in the Key of Z: The Curious Universe of Outsider Music, radio host Irwin Chusid included a brief reference to Gordon Thomas. "Charming, albeit incredibly clumsy singer and lyricist backed by competent jazz sidemen who probably owed him favors. Thomas played trombone with Dizzy Gillespie in the 1940s. Decades later he recorded perhaps a half-dozen LPs on his own Samhot label, featuring his joyful, loony-tuneless vocals. ... Has a strange fascination with the word 'good'—as a qualitative measure, it occurs in his lyrics with alarming frequency."

== Discography ==
=== As leader ===
- Gordon Thomas and Jim Roberts (Samhot, 1984)
- Gordon (Samhot, 1984)
- Gordon Thomas (Samhot, 1987)

=== As sideman ===
- Count Basie, Pop Goes the Basie (Reprise, 1965)
