= Basie's Beatle Bag =

Studio album by Count Basie
- Released: 1966
- Recorded: May 3–5, 1966
- Genre: Jazz
- Length: 37:30
- Label: Verve
- Producer: Teddy Reig, Peter Spargo

Count Basie chronology
Sinatra at the Sands (1966)	Basie's Beatle Bag (1966)	Basie Swingin' Voices Singin' (1966)

Professional ratings
Review scores
Source	Rating
AllMusic	4.5/5 stars
The Penguin Guide to Jazz Recordings	1.5/4 stars

Basie's Beatle Bag is a 1966 studio album by Count Basie and his orchestra, arranged by Chico O'Farrill. Basie released a second album of Beatles songs, Basie on the Beatles, in 1969.

== Track listing ==
1. "Help!" – 2:15
2. "Can't Buy Me Love" – 3:21
3. "Michelle" – 2:43
4. "I Wanna Be Your Man" – 3:20
5. "Do You Want to Know a Secret" – 2:59
6. "A Hard Day's Night" – 4:22
7. "All My Loving" – 2:59
8. "Yesterday" – 3:04
9. "And I Love Her" – 2:49
10. "Hold Me Tight" – 2:44
11. "She Loves You" – 2:54
12. "Kansas City" (Jerry Leiber, Mike Stoller) – 4:00

All songs written by Lennon and McCartney, except where otherwise noted.

== Personnel ==
The Count Basie Orchestra

- Count Basie – piano, organ
- Sonny Cohn – trumpet
- Al Aarons – trumpet
- Wallace Davenport – trumpet
- Phil Guilbeau – trumpet
- Grover Mitchell – trombone
- Bill Hughes – trombone
- Henderson Chambers – trombone
- Al Grey – trombone
- Marshal Royal – alto saxophone
- Bobby Plater – alto saxophone
- Eric Dixon – tenor saxophone
- Eddie "Lockjaw" Davis – tenor saxophone
- Charlie Fowlkes – baritone saxophone
- Freddie Green – guitar
- Norman Keenan – double bass
- Sonny Payne – drums
- Bill Henderson – vocals on "Yesterday'
- Chico O'Farrill – arranger
