= The Board of Directors (album) =

Studio album by The Mills Brothers, Count Basie and Orchestra
- Released: 1968
- Recorded: November 1967
- Studio: A & R (New York)
- Genre: Swing; Big band
- Length: 32:27
- Label: Dot
- Producer: Teddy Reig and Tom Mack

Count Basie chronology
Half a Sixpence (1967)	The Board of Directors (1968)	Manufacturers of Soul (1968)

The Board of Directors is an LP album by The Mills Brothers with Count Basie and Orchestra. It was released in 1968, was recorded at the A & R Recording Studios in New York City on November 20–21, 1967 with the arrangements and conducting by Dick Hyman, and sound engineering was by Phil Ramone.

The theme of the title was taken from the Basie band album recorded in April 1958, Chairman of the Board (reissued 1970 by Roulette Records). It was resumed in 1968 in the follow-up album The Board of Directors Annual Report, also with the Mills Brothers (Dot Records).

== Track listing ==
1. "Up a Lazy River" - 3:27
2. "I May Be Wrong But I Think You're Wonderful" (Frank Foster solo) - 3:07
3. "Release Me" - 2:39
4. "I Want to Be Happy" (Eric Dixon flute solo) - 1:56
5. "Down-Down-Down (What a Song)" - 2:31
6. "The Whiffenpoof Song" - 3:07
7. "I Dig Rock and Roll Music" - 3:00
8. "Tiny Bubbles" - 3:10
9. "December" - 2:41
10. "Let Me Dream" - 2:46
11. "April in Paris" - 4:03

== Personnel ==
The Mills Brothers
Orchestra:

- Frank Foster (tenor sax)
- Bobby Plater (alto sax)
- Marshal Royal (alto sax)
- Eric Dixon (tenor sax)
- Charles Fowlkes (baritone sax)
- Nat Pavone (trumpet) (20 November only)
- Snookie Young (trumpet) (21 November only)
- Al Aarons (trumpet)
- Gene Goe (trumpet)
- Ernie Royal (trumpet)
- Bill Hughes (trombone)
- Grover Mitchell (trombone)
- Dick Boone (trombone)
- Harlen Floyd (trombone)
- Count Basie (piano)
- Freddie Green (guitar)
- Norman Brown (guitar)
- Norman Keenan (bass)
- Sol Gubin (drums)
