= Sinatra at the Sands =

Live album by Frank Sinatra
- Released: July 1966
- Recorded: January and February 1966
- Venue: Copa Room at The Sands Hotel and Casino (Las Vegas)
- Genres: Vocal jazz; traditional pop
- Length: 76:03
- Labels: Reprise; FS 1019
- Producer: Sonny Burke

Frank Sinatra chronology
| Strangers In The Night (1966) | Sinatra at the Sands (1966) | That's Life (1966) |

Count Basie chronology
| Live at the Sands (Before Frank) (1966) | Sinatra at the Sands (1966) | Basie's Beatle Bag (1966) |

Professional ratings
Review scores
| Source | Rating |
|---|---|
| AllMusic | 4.5/5 stars |
| Mojo | 4/5 stars |
| Encyclopedia of Popular Music | 4/5 stars |

Sinatra at the Sands is a live album by Frank Sinatra accompanied by Count Basie and his orchestra, and conducted and arranged by Quincy Jones, recorded live in the Copa Room of the former Sands Hotel and Casino in Las Vegas in 1966.

It was Sinatra's first live album to be commercially released, and contains many definitive readings of the songs that are most readily associated with Sinatra.

Sinatra and Basie had previously collaborated on 1962's Sinatra-Basie and 1964's It Might As Well Be Swing, with both albums released on Sinatra's Reprise label. The album was remixed and remastered and released in DVD-Audio in high-resolution stereo and multi-channel surround in 2003. An alternate version of the same show with a slightly different track list was released in November 2006 as part of the box set Sinatra: Vegas. The album is certified gold by the Recording Industry Association of America.

In 2000 it was voted number 461 in Colin Larkin's All Time Top 1000 Albums.

== Tea Break ==
"The Tea Break" section of the album contains comic relief by Sinatra, during which he makes jokes about the drunkenness of Dean Martin and evening parties at his home in Beverly Hills, Sammy Davis Jr.'s autobiography Yes I Can and the hotel hiring him for "four solid weeks" as a cleaner, and jokes about himself being "so skinny my eyes were single file. Between those two and my belly button my old man thought I was a clarinet". He denounces the news that he'd recently turned fifty years of age as a "dirty Communist lie" "direct from Hanoi" and that he was really 28 and would have been 22 if Joe E. Lewis hadn't "wrecked" him from drinking. He concludes the segment with a summation of his early life and work lifting crates and serving as a rivet catcher from a cock-eyed guy who "couldn't hit a bull in the fanny with a bag of rice", and describing Edward Bowes as a "pompous bum with a bulbous nose" who "used to drink Green River".

== Track listing ==
From the 1998 Warner Bros. Records reissue, 46947

1. "Come Fly with Me" (Sammy Cahn, Jimmy Van Heusen) – 3:45
2. "I've Got a Crush on You" (George Gershwin, Ira Gershwin) – 2:42
3. "I've Got You Under My Skin" (Cole Porter) – 3:43
4. "The Shadow of Your Smile" (Johnny Mandel, Paul Francis Webster) – 2:31
5. "Street of Dreams" (Victor Young, Sam M. Lewis) – 2:16
6. "One for My Baby (and One More for the Road)" (Harold Arlen, Johnny Mercer) – 4:40
7. "Fly Me to the Moon" (Bart Howard) – 2:50
8. "One O'Clock Jump" [Instrumental] (Count Basie) – 0:53
9. "The Tea Break" (Sinatra Monologue) – 11:48
10. "You Make Me Feel So Young" (Mack Gordon, Josef Myrow) – 3:21
11. "All of Me" [Instrumental] (Gerald Marks, Seymour Simons) – 2:56
12. "The September of My Years" (Cahn, Van Heusen) – 2:57
13. "Luck Be a Lady" (Frank Loesser) – 4:40 (This bonus track was only available on the remastered 1998 CD and 2003 DVD-Audio releases. It was not part of any other edition, including the original LP as well as the 2009 CD release)
14. "Get Me to the Church on Time" (Frederick Loewe, Alan Jay Lerner) – 2:22
15. "It Was a Very Good Year" (Ervin Drake) – 4:01
16. "Don't Worry 'Bout Me" (Rube Bloom, Ted Koehler) – 3:18
17. "Makin' Whoopee" [Instrumental] (Walter Donaldson, Gus Kahn) – 4:24
18. "Where or When" (Richard Rodgers, Lorenz Hart) – 2:46
19. "Angel Eyes" (Earl Brent, Matt Dennis) – 3:26
20. "My Kind of Town" (Cahn, Van Heusen) – 3:04
21. "A Few Last Words" (Sinatra Monologue) – 2:30
22. "My Kind of Town" [Reprise] – 1:00

== Personnel ==
- Frank Sinatra – vocal
- Count Basie – piano
- Bill Miller – piano

The Count Basie Orchestra

- Quincy Jones – arranging, conducting
- Harry "Sweets" Edison – trumpet solo
- Al Aarons – trumpet
- Sonny Cohn – trumpet
- Wallace Davenport – trumpet
- Phil Guilbeau – trumpet
- Al Grey – trombone
- Henderson Chambers – trombone
- Grover Mitchell – trombone
- Bill Hughes – trombone
- Marshal Royal – alto saxophone / clarinet
- Bobby Plater – alto saxophone / flute
- Eric Dixon – tenor saxophone / flute
- Eddie "Lockjaw" Davis – tenor saxophone
- Charlie Fowlkes – baritone saxophone / bass clarinet
- Freddie Green – guitar
- Norman Keenan – double bass
- Irv Cottler – drums
- Sonny Payne – drums

== Charts ==
=== Weekly charts ===
Weekly chart performance for Sinatra at the Sands
| Chart (1966) | Peak position |
|---|---|
| UK Albums (Official Charts) | 7 |
| US Billboard 200 | 9 |

| Chart (2026) | Peak position |
|---|---|
| UK Jazz & Blues Albums (Official Charts) | 7 |

=== Monthly charts ===
Monthly chart performance for Sinatra at the Sands
| Chart (2026) | Peak position |
|---|---|
| German Jazz Albums (Offizielle Top 100) | 7 |

== Certifications ==
| Region | Certification | Certified units/sales |
|---|---|---|
| United Kingdom (BPI) | Silver | 60,000^{^} |
^{^} Shipments figures based on certification alone.

== See also ==
- Sinatra: Vegas (2006) – features an alternate performance.
- Standing Room Only (2018) – features an alternate performance.
