= Manufacturers of Soul =

Studio album by Jackie Wilson and Count Basie
- Released: June 1968
- Recorded: January 3 & 4, 1968; Los Angeles, CA
- Genre: Soul jazz
- Label: Brunswick; BL-54134
- Producer: Nat Tarnopol and Teddy Reig

Jackie Wilson chronology
Higher and Higher (1967)	Manufacturers of Soul (1968)	I Get the Sweetest Feeling (1968)

Count Basie chronology
The Board of Directors (1967)	Manufacturers of Soul (1968)	The Board of Directors Annual Report (1968)

Manufacturers of Soul is an album by soul music vocalist Jackie Wilson and jazz pianist and bandleader Count Basie featuring performances of jazz versions of contemporary R&B/soul hits recorded in 1968 and released on the Brunswick label.

== Reception ==
Professional ratings
Review scores
Source	Rating
AllMusic	3/5 stars

AllMusic awarded the album 3 stars.

== Track listing ==
1. "Funky Broadway" (Lester Christian) – 2:35
2. "For Your Precious Love" (Arthur Brooks, Richard Brooks, Jerry Butler) – 2:40
3. "In the Midnight Hour" (Steve Cropper, Wilson Pickett) – 2:47
4. "Ode to Billy Joe" (Bobbie Gentry) – 4:10
5. "Chain Gang" (Sam Cooke) – 2:47
6. "I Was Made to Love Her" (Stevie Wonder, Lula Mae Hardaway, Henry Cosby, Sylvia Moy) – 2:50
7. "Uptight (Everything's Alright)" (Stevie Wonder, Henry Cosby, Sylvia Moy) – 2:35
8. "I Never Loved a Woman (The Way I Love You)" (Ronnie Shannon) – 2:41
9. "Respect" (Otis Redding) – 2:20
10. "Even When You Cry" (Quincy Jones, Alan and Marilyn Bergman) – 2:42
11. "My Girl" (Smokey Robinson, Ronald White) – 2:48

== Personnel ==
- Jackie Wilson – vocals
- Count Basie – piano
- Al Aarons, Oscar Brashear, Gene Coe, Sonny Cohn – trumpet
- Richard Boone, Steve Galloway, Grover Mitchell – trombone
- Bill Hughes – bass trombone
- Bobby Plater, Marshal Royal – alto saxophone
- Eric Dixon, Eddie "Lockjaw" Davis – tenor saxophone
- Charlie Fowlkes – baritone saxophone
- Freddie Green – guitar
- Uncredited – bass
- Harold Jones – drums
- Benny Carter – arranger
