= Al Aarons =

American jazz trumpeter (1932–2015)

- Born: March 23, 1932; Pittsburgh, Pennsylvania, U.S.
- Died: November 17, 2015 (aged 83) Laguna Woods, California
- Genres: Jazz
- Occupation: Musician
- Instrument: Trumpet

Albert Aarons (March 23, 1932 – November 17, 2015) was an American jazz trumpeter.

== Biography ==
Aarons was born in Pittsburgh, Pennsylvania, and graduated from Wayne State University in Detroit. He began to gain attention as a trumpet player in 1956, and started working with jazz artist Yusef Lateef and pianist Barry Harris in the latter part of that decade in Detroit. After a period playing with jazz organist Wild Bill Davis, he played trumpet in the Count Basie Orchestra from 1961 to 1969.

In the 1970s, Aarons worked as a sideman for singers Sarah Vaughan and Ella Fitzgerald, and saxophonist Gene Ammons. He was also a contributor to jazz fusion, playing on School Days with Stanley Clarke, and appears with Snooky Young on the classic 1976 album Bobby Bland and B. B. King Together Again...Live.

== Discography ==
=== As leader ===
- Al Aarons & the L.A. Jazz Caravan (LOSA, 1996?)

=== As sideman ===
With Gene Ammons

- Free Again (Prestige, 1971)

With Count Basie

- The Legend (Roulette, 1961)
- Back with Basie (Roulette, 1962)
- Basie in Sweden (Roulette, 1962)
- On My Way & Shoutin' Again! (Verve, 1962)
- This Time by Basie! (Reprise, 1963)
- More Hits of the 50's and 60's (Verve, 1963)
- Pop Goes the Basie (Reprise, 1965)
- Basie Meets Bond (United Artists, 1966)
- Live at the Sands (Before Frank) (Reprise, 1966 [1998])
- Sinatra at the Sands (Reprise, 1966) with Frank Sinatra
- Basie's Beatle Bag (Verve, 1966)
- Broadway Basie's...Way (Command, 1966)
- Hollywood...Basie's Way (Command, 1967)
- Basie's Beat (Verve, 1967)
- Basie's in the Bag (Brunswick, 1967)
- The Happiest Millionaire (Coliseum, 1967)
- Half a Sixpence (Dot, 1967)
- The Board of Directors (Dot, 1967) with The Mills Brothers
- Manufacturers of Soul (Brunswick, 1968) with Jackie Wilson
- The Board of Directors Annual Report (Dot, 1968) with The Mills Brothers
- Basie Straight Ahead (Dot, 1968)
- How About This (Paramount, 1968) with Kay Starr
- Standing Ovation (Dot, 1969)

With Brass Fever

- Time Is Running Out (Impulse!, 1976)

With Kenny Burrell

- Both Feet on the Ground (Fantasy, 1973)

With Frank Capp

- Live at the Century Plaza (Concord, 1972)

With Buddy Collette

- Blockbuster (RGB, 1973)
- Jazz for Thousand Oaks (UFO-Bass, 1996)

With Ella Fitzgerald

- Ella and Basie! (Verve, 1963)

With Benny Golson

- Killer Joe (Columbia, 1977)

With Eddie Harris

- How Can You Live Like That? (Atlantic, 1976)

With Gene Harris

- Nexus (1975)

With Milt Jackson

- Memphis Jackson (Impulse!, 1969)

With Carmen McRae

- Can't Hide Love (Blue Note, 1976)

With Essra Mohawk

- Primordial Lovers (Reprise, 1970)

With Zoot Sims with the Benny Carter Orchestra

- Passion Flower: Zoot Sims Plays Duke Ellington (1979) - Al Aarons, Oscar Brashear, Bobby Bryant, Earl Gardner, J.J. Johnson, Grover Mitchell, Benny Powell, Britt Woodman, Marshal Royal, Frank Wess, Buddy Collette, Plas Johnson, Jimmy Rowles, John Collins, Andy Simpkins, Grady Tate, Benny Carter (arr, cond) Hollywood, CA, August 14, 1979

With Frank Wess

- Southern Comfort (Prestige, 1962)

With Gerald Wilson

- Calafia (Trend, 1985)
