= Norman Keenan =

American jazz musician

Norman Dewey Keenan (November 23, 1916 in Union, South Carolina – February 12, 1980 in New York City) was an American jazz double-bassist.

Keenan began playing piano before learning bass at age 15. He worked with Tiny Bradshaw (mid-1930s), Lucky Millinder (1939–40), Henry Wells (1940), Earl Bostic, and Cootie Williams, and jammed at Minton's Playhouse around the same time. Following World War II he worked with Williams again and with Eddie Cleanhead Vinson in 1947-49. From 1949 to 1957 he was the bassist in the house trio at the Village Vanguard. After backing Harry Belafonte from 1957 to 1962 and working on the TV show Hootenanny, he began playing jazz again in the 1960s, with Count Basie (1965-74) and Roy Eldridge (1966).

== Discography ==
=== As sideman ===
With Count Basie

- Sinatra at the Sands (Reprise, 1966)
- Basie Meets Bond (United Artists, 1966)
- Arthur Prysock/Count Basie (Verve, 1966)
- Basie's Beatle Bag (Verve, 1966)
- Basie's Beat (Verve, 1967)
- Basie's in the Bag (Brunswick, 1967)
- The Happiest Millionaire (Coliseum, 1967)
- Half a Sixpence (Dot, 1967)
- The Board of Directors with The Mills Brothers (Dot, 1967)
- The Board of Directors Annual Report with The Mills Brothers (Dot, 1968)
- Broadway Basie's...Way (Command, 1966)
- Hollywood...Basie's Way (Command, 1966)
- Basie Straight Ahead (Dot, 1968)
- How About This with Kay Starr (Paramount, 1968)
- Standing Ovation (Dot, 1969)
- Basic Basie (MPS, 1969)
- Basie on the Beatles (Happy Tiger, 1969)
- Afrique (Flying Dutchman, 1971)
- Have a Nice Day (Daybreak, 1971)
- Bing 'n Basie (Daybreak, 1972)
- Live at the Sands (Before Frank) (Reprise, 1998)

With Harry Belafonte

- Jump Up Calypso (RCA Victor, 1961)
- The Many Moods of Belafonte (RCA Victor, 1962)
- The Midnight Special (RCA Victor, 1962)

With others

- Miriam Makeba, The Many Voices of Miriam Makeba (Kapp, 1962)
- Chad Mitchell, Blowin' in the Wind (Kapp, 1963)
- Chad Mitchell, In Action (Kapp, 1963)
