= Henderson Chambers =

American jazz musician (1908–1967)

- Born: May 1, 1908; Alexandria, Louisiana, U.S.
- Died: October 19, 1967 (aged 59); New York City, New York, U.S.
- Genres: Jazz
- Instruments: Trombone, Tenor saxophone, Tuba, Trumpet

Henderson Chambers (May 1, 1908 – October 19, 1967) was an American jazz trombonist.

== Early life and education ==
Chambers was born in Alexandria, Louisiana. He studied at Leland College and Morehouse College, then joined Neil Montgomery's band in 1931.

== Career ==
Chambers played in Nashville with Doc Banks in 1932, then with Jack Jackson's Pullman Porters, Speed Webb, Zack Whyte, and Al Sears in Kentucky. During his career, he played trombone, tenor saxophone, trumpet, and tuba.

After two years with Tiny Bradshaw in the middle of the 1930s, Chambers moved to New York City, where he played with Chris Columbus at the Savoy Ballroom in 1939-40. Following this he played with Louis Armstrong, an erngagement which lasted until 1943. Later in the 1940s, he worked with Don Redman, Sy Oliver, Lucky Millinder, and Count Basie; in the 1950s he spent time with Cab Calloway, Doc Cheatham, Duke Ellington, and Mercer Ellington. He also did work as a studio musician. After joining Ray Charles's band from 1961 to 1963, Chambers played with Basie again until 1966.

Chambers finally played with Edgar Battle, shortly before his own death from a heart attack, in 1967 in New York City.

== Discography ==
=== As sideman ===
With Count Basie

- Dance Session (Clef, 1953)
- Pop Goes the Basie (Reprise, 1965)
- Basie Picks the Winners (Verve, 1965)
- Basie Meets Bond (United Artists, 1966)
- Basie's Beatle Bag (Verve, 1966)
- Basie's Beat (Verve, 1967)
- Live at the Sands (Before Frank) (Reprise, 1998)

With Buck Clayton

- The Huckle-Buck and Robbins' Nest (Columbia, 1954)
- Buck Clayton Jams Benny Goodman (Columbia, 1955)
- All the Cats Join In (Columbia, 1956)
- Buck Meets Ruby (Vanguard, 1957)
- Just a Groove (Vanguard, 1973)

With others

- Gene Ammons, Sock! (Prestige, 1965)
- Cat Anderson, Cat On a Hot Tin Horn (Mercury, 1958)
- Sammy Davis Jr., I Gotta Right to Swing (Brunswick, 1960)
- Ella Fitzgerald, The First Lady of Song (Decca, 1958)
- Edmond Hall, Rompin' in '44 (Circle, 1983)
- Arthur Prysock & Count Basie, Arthur Prysock/Count Basie (Verve, 1966)
- Jimmy Rushing, Goin' to Chicago (Vanguard, 1955)
- Frank Sinatra & Count Basie, It Might as Well Be Swing (Reprise, 1964)
- Frank Sinatra, Sinatra at the Sands (Reprise, 1966)
- Ernie Wilkins, The Big New Band of the 60's (Everest, 1960)
