= Sonny Cohn =

American jazz trumpeter (1925–2006)

Background information
- Also known as: Sonny Cohn
- Born: George Thomas Cohn; March 14, 1925; Chicago, Illinois
- Died: November 7, 2006 (aged 81) Chicago, Illinois
- Genres: Jazz
- Occupation: Musician
- Instrument: Trumpet
- Years active: 1943–2003
- Labels: Savoy; Sultan; National
- Formerly of: Red Saunders; Count Basie; Charles Fowlkes; Bill Hughes; Grover Mitchell

George Thomas Cohn (March 14, 1925 – November 7, 2006), known professionally as Sonny Cohn, was an American jazz trumpeter whose career spanned over six decades. After working for fifteen years with Red Saunders (1945–1960), Cohn went on to spend another twenty-four years in Count Basie's trumpet section (1960–1984).

== Life and career ==
Cohn was born in Chicago, Illinois. Cohn started playing in small groups around the city with King Fleming while he was still a teenager. Cohn joined Red Saunders' group in 1945, while Saunders was out of the Club DeLisa and working with a sextet instead of his usual mid-sized band.

After his stint in the military, Cohn joined the Saunders group at the Capitol Lounge in Chicago; Leon Washington had recommended him. Cohn was featured on Saunders' first recordings as a leader, for Savoy, Sultan, and (behind Big Joe Turner) on National. Cohn was heard on the records that Saunders made for OKeh Records beginning in 1951 through 1953. After those records, Cohn was on Saunders' recordings for Parrot and Blue Lake in 1953 and 1954. Cohn survived several downsizings of the Red Saunders band, as well as the closure of the Club DeLisa, but eventually accepted an offer from Count Basie, with whom he worked from 1960 through 1984. After Basie's death, Cohn returned to Chicago, where he remained active as a musician for another two decades.

== Health and death ==
Cohn underwent bypass surgery in 2003. Cohn died on November 7, 2006, in his hometown of Chicago, Illinois at the age of 81. His funeral was held on November 11, 2006, and he was buried at Burr Oak Cemetery in Alsip, Illinois.

== Discography ==
With Count Basie

- Not Now, I'll Tell You When (Roulette, 1960)
- The Count Basie Story (Roulette, 1960)
- Kansas City Suite (Roulette, 1960)
- The Legend (Roulette, 1961)
- Back with Basie (Roulette, 1962)
- Basie in Sweden (Roulette, 1962)
- On My Way & Shoutin' Again! (Verve, 1962)
- This Time by Basie! (Reprise, 1963)
- More Hits of the 50's and 60's (Verve, 1963)
- Pop Goes the Basie (Reprise, 1965)
- Basie Meets Bond (United Artists, 1966)
- Live at the Sands (Before Frank) (Reprise, 1966 [1998])
- Sinatra at the Sands (Reprise, 1966) with Frank Sinatra
- Basie's Beatle Bag (Verve, 1966)
- Broadway Basie's...Way (Command, 1966)
- Hollywood...Basie's Way (Command, 1967)
- Basie's Beat (Verve, 1967)
- Basie's in the Bag (Brunswick, 1967)
- The Happiest Millionaire (Coliseum, 1967)
- Manufacturers of Soul (Brunswick, 1968) with Jackie Wilson
- The Board of Directors Annual Report (Dot, 1968) with The Mills Brothers
- Basie Straight Ahead (Dot, 1968)
- How About This (Paramount, 1968) with Kay Starr
- Standing Ovation (Dot, 1969)
- Basic Basie (MPS, 1969)
- Basie on the Beatles (Happy Tiger, 1969)
- High Voltage (MPS, 1970)
- Me and You (Pablo, 1983)

With Jodie Christian

- Front Line (Delmark, 1996)

With Duke Jordan

- Les Liaisons Dangereuses (Vogue, 1962)

With James Moody

- Last Train from Overbrook (Argo, 1958)
