= Bobby Plater =

American jazz musician

Robert C. Plater (May 13, 1914, Newark, New Jersey – November 20, 1982, Lake Tahoe) was an American jazz alto saxophonist.

Plater began playing alto sax at age 12, and played locally in Newark with Donald Lambert and the Savoy Dictators in the 1930s. He played with Tiny Bradshaw from 1940 to 1942 before spending 1942-45 serving in the U.S. military during World War II. After his discharge he worked briefly with Cootie Williams, then played intermittently with Lionel Hampton between 1946 and 1964. He also undertook arrangement work with Hampton, and did some freelance work besides. In 1964 he took Frank Wess's place in the Count Basie Orchestra, where he played until his death in 1982. His only recordings as a leader were four songs for Bullet Records in 1950.

Plater was the co-composer of "Jersey Bounce", a popular dance number in the 1940s, recorded by various musicians including Glenn Miller and Ella Fitzgerald.

== Discography ==
=== As sideman ===
With Count Basie

- Pop Goes the Basie (Reprise, 1965)
- Basie Picks the Winners (Verve, 1965)
- Basie Meets Bond (United Artists, 1966)
- Broadway Basie's...Way (Command, 1966)
- Hollywood...Basie's Way (Command, 1966)
- Sinatra at the Sands with Frank Sinatra (Reprise, 1966)
- Basie's Beatle Bag (Verve, 1966)
- Arthur Prysock/Count Basie (Verve, 1966)
- Basie's Beat (Verve, 1967)
- Basie's in the Bag (Brunswick, 1967)
- Manufacturers of Soul with Jackie Wilson (Brunswick, 1968)
- The Happiest Millionaire (Coliseum, 1967)
- The Board of Directors with The Mills Brothers (Dot, 1967)
- The Board of Directors Annual Report with The Mills Brothers (Dot, 1968)
- Basie Straight Ahead (Dot, 1968)
- Half a Sixpence (Dot, 1968)
- How About This with Kay Starr (Paramount, 1968)
- Standing Ovation (Dot, 1969)
- Basie on the Beatles (Happy Tiger, 1969)
- Basic Basie (MPS, 1969)
- Afrique with Oliver Nelson (Flying Dutchman, 1971)
- Bing 'n Basie with Bing Crosby (Daybreak, 1972)
- Basie Big Band (Pablo, 1975)
- I Told You So (Pablo, 1976)
- Montreux '77 (Pablo, 1977)
- Prime Time (Pablo, 1977)
- Milt Jackson & Count Basie (Pablo, 1978)
- Our Shining Hour with Sammy Davis (Verve, 1979)
- On the Road (Pablo, 1980)
- Kansas City Shout (Pablo, 1980)
- A Perfect Match with Ella Fitzgerald (Pablo, 1980)
- Digital III at Montreux with Ella Fitzgerald (Pablo, 1980)
- Warm Breeze (Pablo, 1981)
- Send in the Clowns with Sarah Vaughan (Pablo, 1981)
- A Classy Pair with Ella Fitzgerald (Pablo, 1982)
- Farmers Market Barbecue (Pablo, 1982)
- Count Basie in Sweden 1968 (Vee Jay, 1983)
- Have a Nice Day (Daybreak, 1971)
- Live at the Sands (Before Frank) (Reprise, 1998)

With Lionel Hampton

- Lionel Hampton Big Band (Clef, 1955)
- Lionel Hampton Apollo Hall Concert 1954 (Epic, 1955)
- Wailin' at the Trianon (Columbia, 1955)
- Jazz Flamenco (RCA Victor, 1957)
- Golden Vibes (Columbia, 1959)
- Hamp's Big Band (Audio Fidelity, 1959)
- The Many Sides of Hamp (Glad, 1961)
- The Exciting Hamp in Europe (Glad-Hamp, 1962)
- Live! (Fontana, 1966)
- Lionel Hampton (Amiga, 1976)
- Hamp's Big Band Live! (Glad-Hamp, 1979)
