= Wallace Davenport =

American musician (1925–2004)

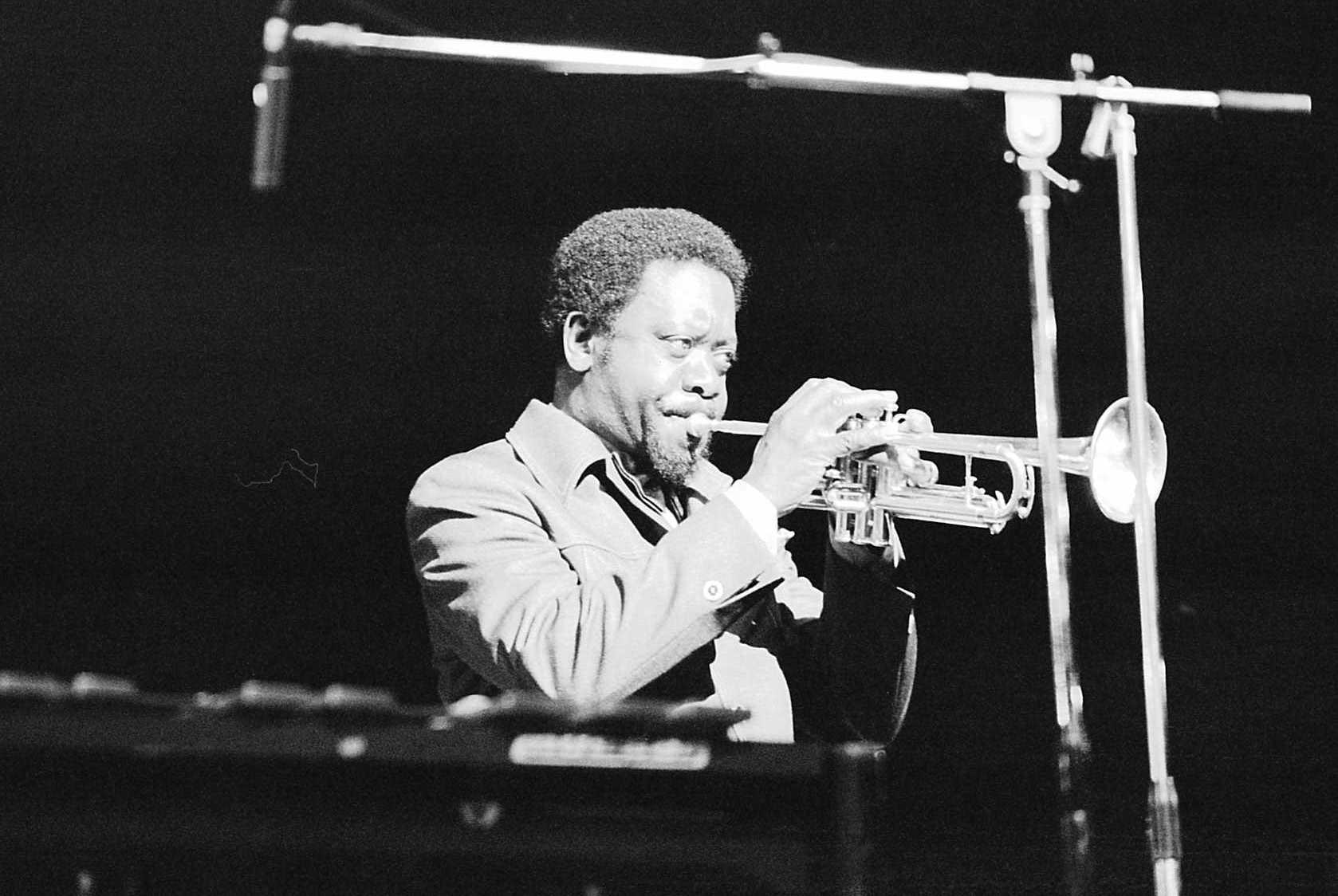
Wallace Davenport at the 1976 North Sea Jazz Festival.

Wallace Foster Davenport (30 June 1925 – 18 March 2004) was an American jazz trumpeter. Davenport has been one of the few traditional jazz musicians of the 1930s who later branched out into swing and bop styles, as well as backing gospel and R&B vocalists during an extensive career in eight different decades.

Davenport was born in New Orleans, Louisiana. He started on trumpet at age 13 with The Young Tuxedo Brass Band. He played with Papa Celestin in 1941 before leaving New Orleans to serve in the U. S. Navy. Davenport returned there after World War II, making an easy transition to swing and bop with various bands. He recorded with Roy Brown in 1947. During the 1950s he toured the US and Europe playing with Lionel Hampton, and recorded in Paris in the mid-'50 with Mezz Mezzrow.

Davenport played and recorded with the Count Basie jazz orchestra (1964–1966), and also toured with singers Ray Charles and Lloyd Price. In 1969 he went back to doing traditional jazz in New Orleans, and issued recordings of his groups playing this style from on his own label My Jazz (1971–1976); recorded again in Europe with George Wein in 1974, with Panama Francis and Arnett Cobb in 1976, and also reunited with Hampton and recorded with Earl Hines this same year. In the eighties, Davenport worked with both traditional units as The Alliance Hall Dixieland Band and gospel groups like The Zion Harmonizers and Aline White, and backed the vocalists Frank Sinatra and Sammy Davis Jr. However, he routinely went on impromptu tours in Asia and Europe, and once played expressly for the king Olav V of Norway.

A cultural icon of New Orleans, Davenport played regularly at the New Orleans Jazz & Heritage Festival and the French Quarter Festival. He received numerous awards and recognitions for his musical contributions from the city government and local arts groups, including a plaque from the City of New Orleans and lifetime achievement awards from the Preservation Resource Center's African-American Historic Preservation Council, the New Orleans Streets Arts Council and the Ashe Cultural Center.

Wallace Davenport died in New Orleans, Louisiana, at 78 years of age. His nephew was Roger Donald Dickerson.

== Discography ==
With Count Basie

- Pop Goes the Basie (Reprise, 1965)
- Basie Meets Bond (United Artists, 1966)
- Live at the Sands (Before Frank) (Reprise, 1966 [1998])
- Sinatra at the Sands (Reprise, 1966) with Frank Sinatra
- Basie's Beatle Bag (Verve, 1966)
- Basie's Beat (Verve, 1967)

With Phil Upchurch

- Feeling Blue (Milestone, 1967)
