= Bill Hughes (musician) =

American jazz trombonist and bandleader

- Born: William Henry Hughes; March 28, 1930; Dallas, Texas
- Origin: Washington, D.C., USA
- Died: January 14, 2018 (aged 87)
- Genres: Jazz, swing, big band
- Occupations: Musician, bandleader
- Instrument: Trombone
- Years active: 1946–2010
- Formerly of: The Count Basie Orchestra

William Henry Hughes (March 28, 1930 – January 14, 2018) was an American jazz trombonist and bandleader. He spent most of his career with the Count Basie Orchestra and was the director of that ensemble until September 2010.

== Biography ==
=== Early life and career ===
Bill Hughes was born in Dallas, Texas, and his family moved to Washington, D.C., when he was nine years old. His father worked at the Bureau of Engraving and played trombone in the Elks Club marching band. Hughes began playing the trombone at age twelve or thirteen and was performing at Washington jazz venues by the age of sixteen. One of these venues was the 7T Club, where he performed with saxophonist and flautist Frank Wess. While students at Howard University, Hughes and Wess played in the Howard Swingmasters, along with bassist Eddie Jones. The Swingmasters were one of several early groups that helped promote the study and performance of jazz at Historically Black Colleges and Universities. Although interested in playing music, Hughes originally wanted to pursue a career as a pharmacist. He graduated from the Howard University School of Pharmacy in 1952 and began working at the National Institutes of Health.

=== The Count Basie Orchestra ===
His career plans changed the following year when Wess, a member of the Count Basie Orchestra, suggested that Count Basie invite Hughes to join the band. Hughes was also asked to join the Duke Ellington Orchestra; however in September 1953, he joined the Basie band where he already knew members Frank Wess, Eddie Jones, and Benny Powell. Hughes played in a three-piece tenor trombone section with Powell and Henry Coker until September 1957, when he decided to take a break from touring in order to help raise his family. During this hiatus, Hughes worked for the United States Postal Service and played trombone at the Howard Theater as well as with some small groups in Washington. A few years after returning to the band in July 1963, Hughes switched from the tenor to the bass trombone. Hughes took over leadership of the band in 2003 following the death of Grover Mitchell. He retired from the band in September 2010, stating he wanted to spend more time with his wife Dolores, whom he married on July 6, 1952. He spent the last years of his life in Staten Island, New York with his wife Dolores and three children David, Stephen, and Gwendolyn.

== Discography ==
With the Count Basie Orchestra

- Dance Session Album#2 (Clef, 1954)
- Basie (Clef, 1954)
- Count Basie Swings, Joe Williams Sings (Clef, 1955) with Joe Williams
- April in Paris (Verve, 1956)
- The Greatest!! Count Basie Plays, Joe Williams Sings Standards with Joe Williams
- Metronome All-Stars 1956 (Clef, 1956) with Ella Fitzgerald and Joe Williams
- Hall of Fame (Verve, 1956 [1959])
- One O'Clock Jump (Verve, 1957) with Joe Williams and Ella Fitzgerald
- Count Basie at Newport (Verve, 1957)
- Everyday I Have the Blues (Roulette, 1959) with Joe Williams
- The Count Basie Story (Roulette, 1960)
- Pop Goes the Basie (Reprise, 1965)
- Basie Meets Bond (United Artists, 1966)
- Live at the Sands (Before Frank) (Reprise, 1966 [1998])
- Sinatra at the Sands (Reprise, 1966) with Frank Sinatra
- Basie's Beatle Bag (Verve, 1966)
- Broadway Basie's...Way (Command, 1966)
- Hollywood...Basie's Way (Command, 1967)
- Basie's Beat (Verve, 1967)
- Basie's in the Bag (Brunswick, 1967)
- The Happiest Millionaire (Coliseum, 1967)
- Half a Sixpence (Dot, 1967)
- The Board of Directors (Dot, 1967) with The Mills Brothers
- Manufacturers of Soul (Brunswick, 1968) with Jackie Wilson
- The Board of Directors Annual Report (Dot, 1968) with The Mills Brothers
- Basie Straight Ahead (Dot, 1968)
- How About This (Paramount, 1968) with Kay Starr
- Standing Ovation (Dot, 1969)
- Basic Basie (MPS, 1969)
- Basie on the Beatles (Happy Tiger, 1969)
- High Voltage (MPS, 1970)
- Send in the Clowns (Pablo, 1981) with Sarah Vaughan
- Me and You (Pablo, 1983)

With Al Grey

- Shades of Grey (Tangerine, 1965)
