= Freddie Green =

American swing jazz guitarist (1911–1987)

Background information
- Born: Frederick William Green; March 31, 1911; Charleston, South Carolina, U.S.
- Died: March 1, 1987 (aged 75) Las Vegas, Nevada, U.S.
- Genres: Jazz, swing
- Occupation: Musician
- Instrument: Guitar
- Website: freddiegreen.org

Frederick William Green (March 31, 1911 – March 1, 1987) was an American swing jazz guitarist who played rhythm guitar with the Count Basie Orchestra for almost fifty years.

== Early life and education ==
Green was born in Charleston, South Carolina on March 31, 1911. He was exposed to music from an early age, and learned the banjo before picking up the guitar in his early teenage years.

A friend of his father by the name of Sam Walker taught Freddie to read music, and keenly encouraged him to keep up his guitar playing. Walker gave Freddie what was perhaps his first gig, playing with a local community group of which Walker was an organizer. Another member of the group was William "Cat" Anderson, who went on to become an established trumpeter, working with notable figures such as Duke Ellington.

== Career ==
It was around this time that Green's parents died, and he moved to New York City to live with his aunt and continue his education. The move opened up a new musical world to Freddie. While still in his teens, he began to play around the clubs of the city, earning money and a reputation. In one of these gigs, he was noticed by the legendary talent scout John H. Hammond, who realized the potential of Green and introduced him to Basie.

In 1937, Basie and his ensemble went to one of Green's gigs on the advice of an associate. Basie was an immediate fan, and approached Green with a job offer. Except for a brief interruption, Freddie Green would remain a pivotal fixture of the Count Basie Band for the next fifty years.

"You should never hear the guitar by itself. It should be part of the drums so it sounds like the drummer is playing chords—like the snare is in A or the hi-hat in D minor"

— Freddie Green

Throughout his career, Green played rhythm guitar, accompanying other musicians, and he rarely played solos. As Ralph Denyer wrote, "His superb timing and ... flowing sense of harmony ... helped to establish the role of the rhythm guitar as an important part of every rhythm section." Green did play a solo on the January 16, 1938, Carnegie Hall concert that featured the Benny Goodman big band. In the jam session on Fats Waller's "Honeysuckle Rose," Green was the rhythm guitarist for the ensemble, which featured Basie, Walter Page (Basie's bassist), and musicians from Duke Ellington's band. After Johnny Hodges' solo, Goodman signalled to Green to take his own solo, which the musician Turk Van Lake described in his commentary on the reissued 1938 Carnegie Hall concert as a "startling move."

He rapidly changed chords, often with every beat, rather than every measure. His chord fingering often involved him covering four strings with his fingers, while depressing only a subset of the notes. He dampened the unsounded notes from chords with his left hand. Green's playing on his signature Stromberg guitar was the model for Ralph Patt's big-band playing.

Green was not a prolific composer, but he did make two major contributions to Count Basie's repertoire, "Down for Double" (recorded in 1941) and "Corner Pocket" (recorded for the album April in Paris in 1955).

On March 1, 1987, Green died of a heart attack in Las Vegas, Nevada at the age of 75.

== Discography ==
=== As leader/co-leader ===
- Mr. Rhythm (RCA Victor, 1955)
- Rhythm Willie with Herb Ellis (Concord Jazz, 1975)

=== As sideman ===
With Count Basie

- Dance Session (Clef, 1953)
- Basie Jazz (Clef, 1954) – rec. 1952
- Dance Session Album #2 (Clef, 1954)
- Basie (Clef, 1954)
- The Count! (Clef, 1955) – rec. 1952
- Count Basie Swings, Joe Williams Sings with Joe Williams (Clef, 1955)
- The Swinging Count! (Clef 1956) – rec. 1952
- April in Paris (Verve, 1956)
- The Greatest!! Count Basie Plays, Joe Williams Sings Standards with Joe Williams (Verve, 1956)
- Metronome All-Stars 1956 with Ella Fitzgerald and Joe Williams (Clef, 1956)
- Basie in London (Verve, 1956)
- One O'Clock Jump with Joe Williams and Ella Fitzgerald (Verve, 1957)
- Count Basie at Newport (Verve, 1957)
- The Atomic Mr. Basie (Roulette, 1957) – aka Basie and E=MC^{2}
- Basie Plays Hefti (Roulette, 1958)
- Sing Along with Basie with Joe Williams and Lambert, Hendricks & Ross (Roulette, 1958)
- Memories Ad-Lib with Joe Williams (Roulette, 1958)
- Basie/Eckstine Incorporated with Billy Eckstine (Roulette, 1959)
- Basie One More Time (Roulette, 1959)
- Breakfast Dance and Barbecue (Roulette, 1959)
- Everyday I Have the Blues with Joe Williams (Roulette, 1959)
- Dance Along with Basie (Roulette, 1959)
- Hall of Fame (Verve, 1959)
- String Along with Basie (Roulette, 1960)
- Not Now, I'll Tell You When (Roulette, 1960)
- The Count Basie Story (Roulette, 1960)
- Kansas City Suite (Roulette, 1960)
- First Time! The Count Meets the Duke (Columbia, 1961)
- Count Basie and the Kansas City 7 (1962, Impulse!)
- Back with Basie (Roulette, 1962)
- Basie in Sweden (Roulette, 1962)
- On My Way & Shoutin' Again! (Verve, 1962)
- This Time by Basie! (Reprise, 1963)
- More Hits of the 50's and 60's (Verve, 1963)
- Pop Goes the Basie (Reprise, 1965)
- Basie Meets Bond (United Artists, 1966)
- Sinatra at the Sands with Frank Sinatra (Reprise, 1966)
- Basie's Beatle Bag (Verve, 1966)
- Basie Swingin' Voices Singin' with the Alan Copeland Singers (ABC–Paramount, 1966)
- Broadway Basie's...Way (Command, 1966)
- Hollywood...Basie's Way (Command, 1967)
- Basie's Beat (Verve, 1967)
- Basie's in the Bag (Brunswick, 1967)
- The Happiest Millionaire (Coliseum, 1967)
- Half a Sixpence (Dot, 1967)
- The Board of Directors with The Mills Brothers (Dot, 1967)
- Manufacturers of Soul with Jackie Wilson (Brunswick, 1968)
- The Board of Directors Annual Report with The Mills Brothers (Dot, 1968)
- Basie Straight Ahead (Dot, 1968)
- How About This with Kay Starr (Paramount, 1969)
- Standing Ovation (Dot, 1969)
- Basic Basie (MPS, 1969)
- Basie on the Beatles (Happy Tiger, 1969)
- High Voltage (MPS, 1970)
- Loose Walk with Roy Eldridge (Pablo, 1972)
- Satch and Josh (with Oscar Peterson) (Pablo, 1974)
- Kansas City 8: Get Together (Pablo, 1979)
- Me and You (Pablo, 1983)
- Mostly Blues...and Some Others (Pablo, 1983)
- The Original American Decca Recordings (GRP, 1992) – rec. 1937–1939
- Live at the Sands (Before Frank) (Reprise, 1998) – rec. 1966

With Buck Clayton

- The Huckle-Buck and Robbins' Nest (Columbia, 1954)
- How Hi the Fi (Columbia, 1954)
- Jumpin' at the Woodside (Columbia, 1955)
- All the Cats Join In (Columbia, 1956)

With Al Cohn

- The Natural Seven (RCA Victor, 1955)
- That Old Feeling (RCA Victor, 1955)
- Four Brass One Tenor (RCA Victor, 1955)

With Harry Edison

- The Swinger (Verve, 1958)
- Harry Edison Swings Buck Clayton (Verve, 1958)

With Paul Quinichette

- For Basie (Prestige, 1957)
- Basie Reunion (Prestige, 1958)
- Like Basie! (United Artists, 1959)

With Joe Newman

- All I Wanna Do Is Swing (RCA Victor, 1955)
- I'm Still Swinging (RCA Victor, 1955)
- Salute to Satch (RCA Victor, 1956)
- I Feel Like a Newman (Storyville, 1956)
- The Midgets (Vik, 1956)
- Joe Newman with Woodwinds (Roulette, 1958)

With Sarah Vaughan

- Sarah Vaughan in Hi-Fi (Columbia, 1949)
- No Count Sarah (with the Count Basie Orchestra) (EmArcy, 1958)
- Count Basie/Sarah Vaughan (with the Count Basie Orchestra) (Roulette, 1961)
- Send in the Clowns (with the Count Basie Orchestra) (Pablo, 1981)

With others

- Lorez Alexandria, Early in the Morning (Argo, 1960)
- Tony Bennett, In Person! (Columbia, 1959)
- George Benson, 20/20 (Warner Bros., 1985)
- Teresa Brewer, The Songs of Bessie Smith (Flying Dutchman, 1973)
- Bob Brookmeyer and Zoot Sims, Stretching Out (United Artists, 1958)
- Judy Carmichael, Two–Handed Stride (Progressive, 1982)
- Ray Charles, Genius + Soul = Jazz (Impulse, 1961)
- Al Grey, The Thinking Man's Trombone (Argo, 1960)
- Coleman Hawkins, The Saxophone Section (World Wide, 1958)
- Jo Jones, The Main Man (Pablo, 1977)
- Gerry Mulligan, The Gerry Mulligan Songbook (World Pacific, 1957)
- Charlie Parker, Big Band (Clef, 1954)
- Buddy Rich, The Wailing Buddy Rich (Norgran, 1955)
- Charlie Rouse and Paul Quinichette, The Chase Is On (Bethlehem, 1958)
- Frank Sinatra, Sinatra–Basie: An Historic Musical First (Reprise, 1962)
- Frank Sinatra, It Might as Well Be Swing (Reprise, 1964)
- Sonny Stitt, Sonny Stitt Plays Arrangements from the Pen of Quincy Jones (Roost, 1955)
- Sonny Stitt, Sonny Stitt Plays (Roost, 1955)
- Teri Thornton, Devil May Care (Riverside, 1961)
- The Manhattan Transfer, Vocalese (Atlantic, 1985)
- Eddie "Cleanhead" Vinson, Clean Head's Back in Town (Bethlehem, 1957)
- Big Joe Turner, The Boss of the Blues (Atlantic, 1956)
- Big Joe Turner, Big Joe Rides Again (Atlantic, 1960)
- Frank Wess, Opus in Swing (Savoy, 1956)
- Frank Wess, Jazz for Playboys (Savoy, 1957)
