= Grover Mitchell =

American jazz trombonist

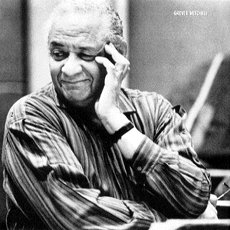

Background information
- Born: Grover Curry Mitchell; 17 March 1930; Whatley, Alabama, U.S.
- Died: 6 August 2003 (aged 73) New York City, U.S.
- Genres: Jazz
- Occupations: Musician, bandleader
- Instrument: Trombone
- Years active: 1960–2000
- Labels: Stash, Ken

Grover Mitchell, born Grover Curry Mitchell (March 17, 1930 – August 6, 2003) was an American jazz trombonist who led the Count Basie Orchestra.

== Biography ==
Mitchell was born in Whately, Alabama, but he moved with his parents to Pittsburgh, Pennsylvania, when he was eight. He played the bugle in school and wanted to play trumpet. However, the school band needed a trombonist and reportedly Mitchell's long arms fit the task. He was a member of the school's orchestra with Ahmad Jamal and Dakota Staton. At sixteen, he played with King Kolax's territory band in Indiana.

In 1951 he joined the U.S. Marines and played in a military band. After being discharged in 1953, he moved to San Francisco, where he worked with Earl Hines, Lionel Hampton, and Duke Ellington. From 1962–1970, he was a member of the Count Basie Orchestra. Mitchell had been a fan of Tommy Dorsey, as Count Basie told him he sounded like him. He spent the next decade working in television and movies, then returned to Basie's orchestra in 1980 and remained with it until his death in 1984. Thad Jones became leader of the orchestra, followed by Frank Foster, then Mitchell in 1995.

As bandleader, Mitchell won the Grammy Award for Best Large Jazz Ensemble Album for Live at Manchester Craftsmen's Guild (1996) and Count Plays Duke (1998)

He died of cancer in New York at the age of 73.

== Discography ==
=== As leader ===
- Meet Grover Mitchell (Jazz Chronicles, 1979)
- The Devil's Waltz (Jazz Chronicles, 1980)
- Live at the Red Parrot (Hemisphere, 1984)
- Grover Mitchell & His Orchestra (Stash, 1987)
- Truckin' (Stash, 1987)
- Hip Shakin' (Ken, 1990)
- Live at Manchester Craftsmen's Guild (1996) with the Count Basie Orchestra
- On Track with his New Blue Devils (Quixotic Records, 1997)
- Count Plays Duke with the Count Basie Orchestra (MAMA, 1998)
- Swing Shift (MAMA/Summit, 1999)
- Grover Mitchell Big Band (Storyville, 2004)

=== As sideman ===
With Count Basie

- On My Way & Shoutin' Again! (Verve, 1962)
- This Time by Basie! (Reprise, 1963)
- More Hits of the 50's and 60's (Verve, 1963)
- Pop Goes the Basie (Reprise, 1965)
- Basie Meets Bond (United Artists, 1966)
- Live at the Sands (Before Frank) (Reprise, 1966 [1998])
- Sinatra at the Sands (Reprise, 1966) with Frank Sinatra
- Basie's Beatle Bag (Verve, 1966)
- Broadway Basie's...Way (Command, 1966)
- Hollywood...Basie's Way (Command, 1967)
- Basie's Beat (Verve, 1967)
- Basie's in the Bag (Brunswick, 1967)
- The Happiest Millionaire (Coliseum, 1967)
- Half a Sixpence (Dot, 1967)
- The Board of Directors (Dot, 1967) with The Mills Brothers
- Manufacturers of Soul (Brunswick, 1968) with Jackie Wilson
- The Board of Directors Annual Report (Dot, 1968) with The Mills Brothers
- Basie Straight Ahead (Dot, 1968)
- How About This (Paramount, 1968) with Kay Starr
- Standing Ovation (Dot, 1969)
- Basic Basie (MPS, 1969)
- Basie on the Beatles (Happy Tiger, 1969)
- High Voltage (MPS, 1970)
- Me and You (Pablo, 1983)

With Gene Ammons

- Free Again (Prestige, 1971)

With Joey DeFrancesco

- Where Were You? (Columbia, 1990)

With Al Grey

- Shades of Grey (Tangerine, 1965)

With Eddie Harris

- How Can You Live Like That? (Atlantic, 1976)

With Oliver Nelson

- Skull Session (Flying Dutchman, 1975)
