= Eric Dixon (musician) =

American jazz musician (1930–1989)

- Born: March 28, 1930; New York City, New York, U.S.
- Died: October 19, 1989 (aged 59) New York City, New York, U.S.
- Genres: Jazz
- Instruments: Tenor saxophone, flute

Eric "Big Daddy" Dixon (March 28, 1930 – October 19, 1989) was an American jazz tenor saxophonist, flautist, composer, and arranger.

Dixon's professional career extended from 1950 until his death in 1989, during which time he was credited on as many as 200 recordings.

== Career ==
Having played bugle as a child, Dixon took up the tenor saxophone at the age of 12. Following a stint experience a musician in the US Army (1951–1953) he played in groups that sometimes included Mal Waldron, with whom he would later record.

In 1954, he played with Cootie Williams and the following year with Johnny Hodges. In 1956, he performed and recorded with Bennie Green and also took up the flute.

In the late 1950s he spent four years in the house band led by Reuben Phillips at the Apollo Theatre in New York.

In 1959, he toured Europe and recorded with the Cooper Brothers.

He also worked with Paul Gonsalves, Ahmed Abdul-Malik, Oliver Nelson, Quincy Jones, Jack McDuff, Joe Williams, Frank Foster, and Eddie "Lockjaw" Davis, but is probably best known for his tenure in Count Basie's band, which lasted almost two decades. Dixon continued to play in the "ghost band" after Basie's death.

== Discography ==
=== As sideman ===
With Ahmed Abdul-Malik

- The Music of Ahmed Abdul-Malik (New Jazz, 1961)

With Count Basie

- Back with Basie (Roulette, 1962)
- On My Way & Shoutin' Again! (Verve, 1962)
- This Time by Basie! (Reprise, 1963)
- ’’Sinatra-Basie. An historic musical first
- More Hits of the 50's and 60's (Verve, 1963)
- Pop Goes the Basie (Reprise, 1965)
- Basie Meets Bond (United Artists, 1966)
- Live at the Sands (Before Frank) (Reprise, 1966 [1998])
- Sinatra at the Sands (Reprise, 1966) with Frank Sinatra
- Basie's Beatle Bag (Verve, 1966)
- Broadway Basie's...Way (Command, 1966)
- Hollywood...Basie's Way (Command, 1967)
- Basie's Beat (Verve, 1967)
- Basie's in the Bag (Brunswick, 1967)
- The Happiest Millionaire (Coliseum, 1967)
- Half a Sixpence (Dot, 1967)
- The Board of Directors (Dot, 1967) with The Mills Brothers
- Manufacturers of Soul (Brunswick, 1968) with Jackie Wilson
- The Board of Directors Annual Report (Dot, 1968) with The Mills Brothers
- Basie Straight Ahead (Dot, 1968)
- How About This (Paramount, 1968) with Kay Starr
- Standing Ovation (Dot, 1969)
- Basic Basie (MPS, 1969)
- Basie on the Beatles (Happy Tiger, 1969)
- High Voltage (MPS, 1970)

With Kenny Burrell and Brother Jack McDuff

- Somethin' Slick! (Prestige, 1963)
- Crash! (Prestige, 1963)

With Etta Jones

- So Warm (Prestige, 1961)

With Quincy Jones

- Newport '61 (Mercury, 1961)
- Quincy Plays for Pussycats (Mercury, 1959-65 [1965])

With Mal Waldron

- Mal/3: Sounds (Prestige, 1958)
