= Teddy Reig =

American jazz producer, promoter, and manager (1918–1984)

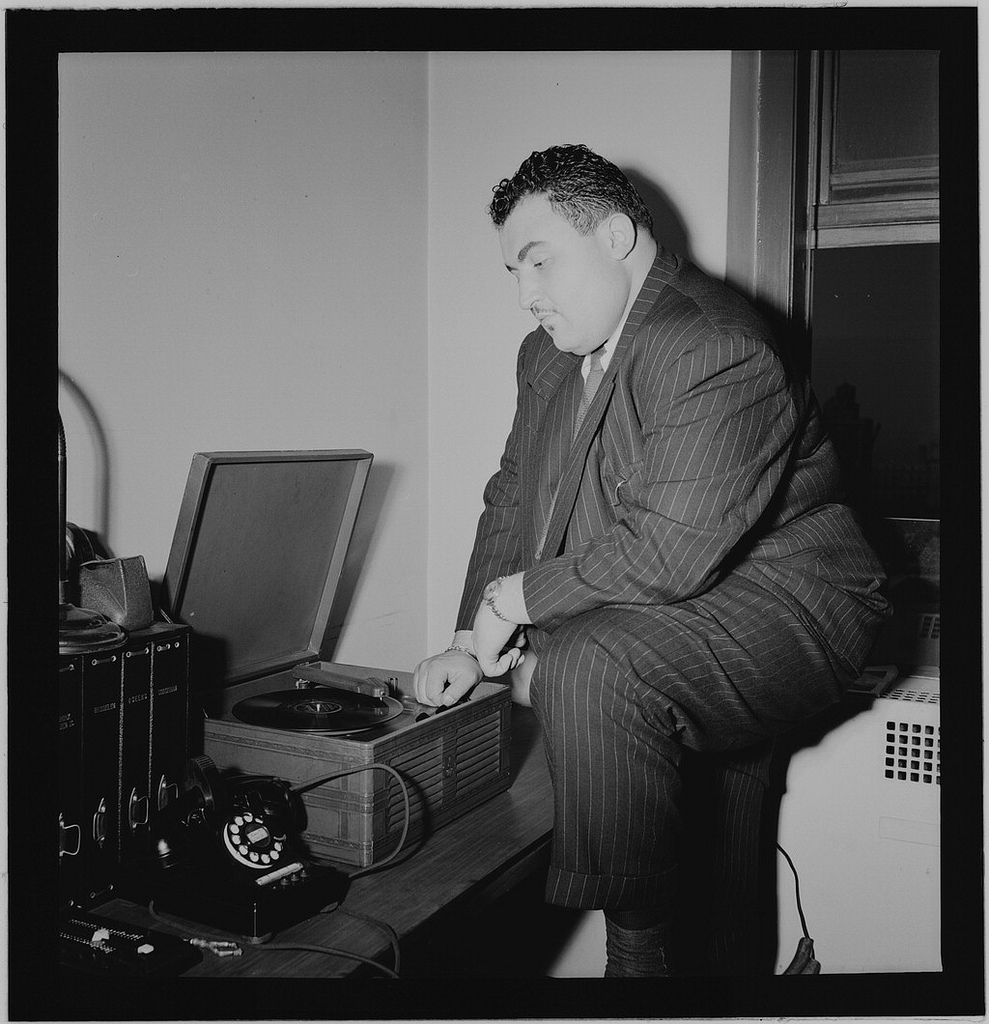

Background information
- Born: Theodore Samuel Reig; November 23, 1918; New York City, U.S.
- Died: September 29, 1984 (aged 65) Teaneck, New Jersey, U.S.
- Genres: Jazz; R&B; Latin
- Occupations: Record producer; record company executive; A&R director
- Years active: 1945–1975
- Labels: Savoy; Roost; Roulette; Verve

Theodore Samuel Reig (November 23, 1918 – September 29, 1984) was a self-described "jazz hustler" who worked as a record producer, A&R man, promoter, and artist manager from the 1940s through the 1970s. As a record producer, he captured the work of dozens of jazz innovators. He also influenced rhythm and blues, rock and roll, and Latin music.

In 1945, Reig produced the first recordings led by the jazz saxophonist Charlie Parker. "Had he done nothing else," said Reig biographer Edward Berger, "this accomplishment alone would have ensured his place in history. But he continued to document the development of the new music through his work with a whole range of seminal artists."

== Early life and personality ==
Jazz historian David Ritz profiled Reig as "a three-hundred-pound-plus, six-foot Jewish promoter born in Harlem..., raised among the thieves and geniuses of the jazz world, [and] an impassioned fan who mastered the art of networking at an early age."

Reig was born to a Jewish family on 110th Street, in Harlem, and attended New Utrecht High School, in Brooklyn. After leaving school without a diploma, he began hanging out at New York ballrooms, jazz clubs, and music hot spots, ingratiating himself with musicians, managers, and impresarios. In his early 20s he served nine months in a Kentucky jail for narcotics possession.

Jazz historian Patrick Burke wrote that Reig "initially earned his club-going money with schemes such as selling worn-out records that had been doctored with shoe polish to look brand new."

"Eventually, he was given small jobs, like placing signs announcing a gig," wrote jazz historian Richard Carlin. "Promoter Cy Shribman took him under his wing hiring him to work as a 'band boy' for Mal Hallett's band ... Band boys were responsible for managing the band's equipment and scores, and arranging the stands and chairs on stage before the band played. Reig's other 'duties' included keeping an eye on the band's stash of marijuana."

[Reig:] Down by the docks in Boston you could get all that crap that you wanted. The band always had a gang of shit [drugs] in the bus. We had a trunkful. I was in charge of the bag, and became everybody's buddy—blacks and whites.

Jazz critic Leonard Weinreich wrote that "Reig lumbered around Harlem's demimonde like a small mountain permanently enveloped in its own ganja mist."

== Work as a record producer ==
Savoy Records had been established in Newark, New Jersey, in 1942 by music entrepreneur Herman Lubinsky. In 1945, Reig, who was familiar with all the groundbreaking beboppers on the New York scene, made a deal with Lubinsky to produce jazz recordings for the label. Over the next four years, Reig recorded countless artists whose names became noted in jazz history.

Reig produced the first recordings by Miles Davis and Stan Getz. He also produced recordings by Dizzy Gillespie, Sarah Vaughan, Don Byas, Erroll Garner, Dexter Gordon, J.J. Johnson, Lester Young, Johnny Smith, Bud Powell, Quincy Jones, Redd Foxx, Sonny Stitt, Lee Morgan, Maynard Ferguson, and countless others.

"There is no question that much of this wonderful jazz would have gone unpreserved had not Reig interrupted his small-time 52nd Street hustles to become an artful bridge between musicians and the money men needed to seed a recording session," wrote jazz columnist Nels Nelson.

== Recording Charlie Parker ==
In November 1945, Reig produced Charlie Parker's first major recording session as a leader. Parker had been performing in New York for several years prior, and he'd done a handful of sessions as a sideman, but due to a recording ban that lasted from 1942 to 1944, his bebop stylings had largely gone unrecorded and were unknown outside the jazz club circuit.

Dave Gelly, at Jazz Journal, wrote that "Savoy's producer, Teddy Reig, had his work cut out assembling the musicians, paying them cash-in-hand, dealing with the union and turning out four masters per session. The material consisted entirely of originals, so there would be no publishers to pay."

About Parker, Reig later reminisced: "Bird's playing says it all. Listen to anybody: Ben [Webster], Hawk [Coleman Hawkins], Lester [Young], and you'll hear the personality of the artist come through. Bird always had a story to tell—and it was a beautiful story. Sometimes I take some of Bird's up-tempo things and play them at slower speeds. You can hear the beautiful melody line clearly. It's not just a gang of notes like some of the guys who think they're playing like Bird spew out."

== Career highlights ==
He produced primarily for Savoy, Roost (a.k.a. Royal Roost, which he co-founded in 1950), Roulette, and Verve. His work at Savoy helped that fledgling label grow quickly into a major jazz and R&B imprint. He also produced releases on Continental, Reprise, Mercury, Duke, United Artists, Command, ABC-Paramount, Brunswick, Dot, and Tico.

While handling A&R for Roulette Records, Reig guided the Count Basie orchestra through its most prolific and popular period. He directed and recorded Teddy Reig's All Stars, featuring trombonist Kai Winding and drummer Shelly Manne, for Savoy Records.

When the jazz records market began to wane in the 1960s, Reig transitioned over to the Latin music market, recording its best practitioners and scouting emerging musicians arriving in the United States from Latin America. He produced recordings by Willie Bobo, Tito Puente, Ray Barretto, Machito, Eddie Palmieri, and Ruth Fernandez.

He is credited with discovering and furthering the career of saxophonist Paul "Hucklebuck" Williams, all of whose Savoy sides Reig produced. Reig convinced Williams to switch his playing from alto to baritone sax, and insisted that Williams learn to aggressively "honk" with his instrument, a technique which led to the artist's commercial breakthrough and became one of his trademarks. In 1955 Reig was instrumental in helping sign an obscure St. Louis-based R&B singer named Chuck Berry to his first agency booking contract.

Reig's management roster included Count Basie, Erroll Garner, guitarist Johnny Smith, Paul Williams, the Solitaires, and others.

== Legacy ==
Reig was profiled in a posthumous 1995 as-told-to autobiography, Reminiscing in Tempo: The Life and Times of a Jazz Hustler, by Edward Berger of the Institute of Jazz Studies. The book was based on reminiscences recorded by Berger in the final years of Reig's life, and included additional reminiscences by musicians and record industry executives who knew and worked with Reig.

"Teddy's big secret of getting the best out of musicians was that he never paid any attention to what was going on in the studio," said Johnny Smith. "I always appreciated the fact that Teddy never came back to tell us what we should be doing. He would let the artists have complete freedom. Teddy knew enough to keep his nose out of the music."

Producer Jerry Wexler said:

Teddy had wonderful taste and cosmic chutzpah. Teddy was the embodiment of Norman Mailer's "White Negro." He had a green card into the black nation. He married a black woman and ... lived black. Before any of us, he also understood how to make a buck off music—and brilliant music at that. Teddy was the guy who produced Bird's landmark recordings for Savoy. Teddy produced the first-ever sessions for Miles [Davis] and [Stan] Getz. [Count] Basie adored Teddy, and Teddy was responsible for Basie's best stuff. ... Teddy was a freelancer and a wheeler-dealer who suffered no fools and took no prisoners. He could be rude and crude. He smoked enough reefer to launch a rocket. Some considered him a liar and schemer and self-serving schmuck. I liked him. I liked the music he made. I liked the fact that he delivered. Were it not for guys like him, the world of recorded jazz would be considerably poorer.

"Once he was in the studio, Teddy knew how to get what he wanted out of these guys," said producer and friend Bob Porter. "You can hire the greatest musicians in the world, and once the tape starts rolling nothing happens. It's not a good feeling! As far as I'm concerned, [Reig] made [Don] Byas's best records, not to mention Dexter [Gordon], Bird, and a few others. But he was a real master with Basie. The Count Basie band that Teddy produced on Roulette never sounded better anywhere, before or after. Teddy really knew what that band was supposed to sound like and he always got it."

== Temperament ==
Though Reig was supportive of musicians, he was hot-tempered, argumentative and belligerent with those in (and out of) the business. Because of his height, girth, and propensity for yelling loudly, he could be extremely intimidating and often prevailed in getting what he wanted. "The only time I saw Teddy scared was when we were mixing the Basie Beatles album out in California at the TTG Studios," recalled MGM-Verve producer Peter Spargo. "All of a sudden, Frank Zappa walked in. Teddy took one look at him and ran out of the room saying, 'What is that?' Zappa just wanted to hear [Basie's] band, but he looked so weird that Teddy didn't know what to make of him!"

Some questioned Reig's integrity and taste. When Sarah Vaughan signed with Roulette in 1960, Reig became her producer. Jazz historian Gary Giddins considers many of her Roulette recordings to be the worst of Vaughan's career. "Reig ... loved jazz as played by Basie and dollars any way they came," wrote Giddins. "That, at least, is the received wisdom about Vaughan's three years at the label, which she did nothing to dispel. At Basie's funeral service, she sat next to Billy Eckstine and giggled with mild embarrassment as [Eckstine] loudly encouraged Reig to rifle the coffin for any loot he might have overlooked."
