= Basie at Birdland =

1961 live album by the Count Basie Orchestra

Live album by Count Basie
- Released: July 28, 1961
- Recorded: June 27–28, 1961
- Venue: Birdland, New York City
- Genre: Jazz
- Length: 35:48
- Label: Roulette

Count Basie chronology
Count Basie/Sarah Vaughan (1961)	Basie at Birdland (1961)	First Time! The Count Meets the Duke (1961)

Basie at Birdland is a 1961 live album by the Count Basie Orchestra, recorded at Birdland in New York City.

== Reception ==
The AllMusic review by Michael G. Nastos stated: "This has always been one of the more enjoyable live recordings from Basie and company, and still can be easily recommended for novices as well as aficionados of his unflappable ability to swing a band like nobody else."

Professional ratings
Review scores
Source	Rating
AllMusic	4/5 stars
The Penguin Guide to Jazz Recordings	3/4 stars

== Track listing ==
1. "Little Pony" (Neal Hefti) – 2:22
2. "Basie" (Ernie Wilkins) – 3:23
3. "Blues Backstage" (Frank Foster) – 4:58
4. "Blee Blop Blues" (A. K. Salim) – 2:17
5. "Whirly-Bird" (Hefti) – 3:59
6. "One O'Clock Jump" (Count Basie) – 0:55
7. "Good Time Blues" (Wilkins) – 6:40
8. "Segue in C" (Frank Wess) – 9:18
9. "One O'Clock Jump" – 4:41
10. "Easin' It" (Foster) – 5:41
11. "A Little Tempo, Please" (Hefti) – 3:02
12. "Corner Pocket" (Freddie Green) – 5:07
13. "I Needs to Be Bee'd With" (Quincy Jones) – 4:23
14. "Discommotion" (Foster) – 4:16
15. "Segue in C" (Wess) – 8:11
16. "Whirly-Bird" – 3:43
17. "One O'Clock Jump" – 1:02

== Personnel ==
- Count Basie – piano
- Marshal Royal – alto saxophone, clarinet
- Frank Wess – alto saxophone, tenor saxophone, flute
- Frank Foster, Budd Johnson – tenor saxophone
- Charlie Fowlkes – baritone saxophone
- Sonny Cohn, Thad Jones, Leonard Johnson, Snooky Young – trumpet
- Benny Powell, Quentin Jackson, Henry Coker – trombone
- Freddie Green – guitar
- Eddie Jones – double bass
- Sonny Payne – drums
- Jon Hendricks – vocals
