= Li'l Ol' Groovemaker...Basie! =

Studio album by Count Basie
- Released: 1963
- Recorded: April 21–22, 1963
- Genre: Jazz
- Length: 35:18
- Label: Verve

Count Basie chronology
More Hits of the 50's and 60's (1963)	Li'l Ol' Groovemaker...Basie! (1963)	Ella and Basie! (1963)

Professional ratings
Review scores
Source	Rating
AllMusic	3/5 stars
Down Beat	3.5/5 stars

Li'l Ol' Groovemaker...Basie! is a 1963 album by the Count Basie Orchestra released by Verve Records. The music was composed and arranged by Quincy Jones.

The album peaked at No. 123 on the Billboard Top LP's, remaining on the chart for five weeks.

== Track listing ==
All tracks composed by Quincy Jones

1. "Li'l Ol' Groovemaker" – 2:48
2. "Pleasingly Plump" – 4:03
3. "Boody Rumble" – 3:36
4. "Belly Roll" – 2:29
5. "Count 'Em" – 5:21
6. "Nasty Magnus" – 6:04
7. "Dum Dum" – 2:41
8. "Lullaby for Jolie (Jolie Ann)" – 2:29
9. "Kansas City Wrinkles" – 5:41

== Personnel ==
The Count Basie Orchestra

- Count Basie – piano,
- Sonny Cohn, Al Aarons, Snooky Young, Fip Ricard, Don Rader – trumpet
- Grover Mitchell, Benny Powell, Urbie Green, Henry Coker – trombone
- Marshal Royal, Frank Wess – alto saxophone
- Frank Foster, Eric Dixon – tenor saxophone
- Charlie Fowlkes – baritone saxophone
- Freddie Green – guitar
- Buddy Catlett – double bass
- Sonny Payne – drums
- Quincy Jones – arranger

== Charts ==
Chart (1963)	Peak position
US Billboard Top LP's	123
