= First Time! The Count Meets the Duke =

1961 album by Duke Ellington

Studio album by Duke Ellington and Count Basie
- Released: 1961
- Recorded: July 6, 1961
- Studios: Columbia 30th Street, New York City
- Genre: Jazz
- Length: 40:58 (original release); 73:43 (1999 expanded and remastered edition)
- Label: Columbia
- Producer: Teo Macero

Duke Ellington chronology
Paris Blues (1961)	First Time! The Count Meets the Duke (1961)	The Girl's Suite and The Perfume Suite (1961)

Count Basie chronology
Basie at Birdland (1961)	First Time! The Count Meets the Duke (1961)	The Legend (1961)

First Time! The Count Meets the Duke is an album by American pianists, composers and bandleaders Duke Ellington and Count Basie with their combined Orchestras recorded and released on the Columbia label in 1961.

On stereo releases of the album, Basie's band is featured on the left channel and Ellington's on the right.

== Reception ==
Professional ratings
Review scores
Source	Rating
AllMusic	4.5/5 stars
Down Beat	4/5 stars
The Penguin Guide to Jazz Recordings	3/4 stars
The Rolling Stone Jazz Record Guide	5/5 stars

The AllMusic review by Scott Yanow awarded the album 4½ stars calling it "a very successful and surprisingly uncrowded encounter. On most selections Ellington and Basie both play piano (their interaction with each other is wonderful) and the arrangements allowed the stars from both bands to take turns soloing".

== Track listing ==
All compositions by Duke Ellington except as indicated

1. "Battle Royal" - 5:33
2. "To You" (Thad Jones) - 3:53
3. "Take the 'A' Train (Billy Strayhorn) - 3:46
4. "Corner Pocket" [a.k.a. "Until I Met You"] (Freddie Green, Donald Wolf) - 4:53
5. "Wild Man" [a.k.a. "Wild Man Moore"] - 6:20
6. "Segue in C" (Frank Wess) - 8:22
7. "B D B" (Ellington, Strayhorn) - 4:43
8. "Jumpin' at the Woodside" (Count Basie) - 3:09

1999 CD Reissue Bonus Tracks

9. "One More Once" - 3:25
10. "Take the 'A' Train" [alternate take] (Strayhorn) - 5:50
11. "Jumpin' at the Woodside" [alternate take] (Basie) - 3:14
12. "B D B" [alternate take] (Ellington, Strayhorn) - 4:30
13. "Blues in Hoss' Flat" (Basie, Frank Foster) - 3:13
14. "Wild Man" [alternate take] - 5:55
15. "Battle Royal" [alternate take] - 6:32

== Personnel ==
- Duke Ellington, Count Basie – piano
- Cat Anderson, Willie Cook, Eddie Mullens, Ray Nance, Sonny Cohn, Lennie Johnson, Thad Jones, Snooky Young – trumpet
- Lou Blackburn, Lawrence Brown, Henry Coker, Quentin Jackson, Benny Powell – trombone
- Juan Tizol – valve trombone and tambourine on Wild Man
- Jimmy Hamilton – clarinet, tenor saxophone
- Johnny Hodges – alto saxophone
- Russell Procope, Marshal Royal – alto saxophone, clarinet
- Frank Wess – alto saxophone, tenor saxophone, flute
- Paul Gonsalves, Frank Foster, Budd Johnson – tenor saxophone
- Harry Carney, Charlie Fowlkes – baritone saxophone
- Freddie Green – guitar
- Aaron Bell, Eddie Jones – bass
- Sam Woodyard, Sonny Payne – drums
