= The Swinging Count! =

Studio album by Count Basie Sextet
- Released: 1956
- Recorded: July 26 and December 12–13, 1952
- Studio: Fine Sound, New York City
- Genre: Jazz
- Length: 39:39
- Label: Clef
- Producer: Norman Granz

Count Basie chronology
The Count! (1952)	The Swinging Count! (1956)	Basie Jazz (1952)

The Swinging Count! is an album by jazz pianist Count Basie in small group sessions recorded in 1952 and released in 1956 on the Clef label. Selections from this album were released on the 1954 Clef LP Basie Jazz.

== Reception ==
Professional ratings
Review scores
Source	Rating
AllMusic	4.5/5 stars

AllMusic awarded the album 4½ stars.

== Track listing ==
1. "Extended Blues" (Count Basie, Oscar Peterson) – 5:55
2. "I Want a Little Girl" (Murray Mencher, Billy Moll) – 2:50
3. "Oh, Lady Be Good!" (George Gershwin, Ira Gershwin) – 2:24
4. "Song of the Islands" (Charles E. King) – 2:49
5. "Basie Beat" (Count Basie) – 3:20
6. "She's Funny That Way" (Neil Moret, Richard A. Whiting) – 4:10
7. "Count's Organ Blues" (Basie) – 3:09
8. "K.C. Organ Blues" (Basie) – 2:53
9. "Blue and Sentimental" (Basie, Mack David, Jerry Livingston) – 3:02
10. "Stan Shorthair" (Basie) – 2:54
11. "As Long as I Live" (Harold Arlen, Ted Koehler) – 3:08
12. "Royal Garden Blues" (Clarence Williams, Spencer Williams) – 3:05
- Recorded at Fine Sound Studios in New York City on July 26 (track 1), December 12 (tracks 2–4) and December 13 (tracks 5–12), 1952

== Personnel ==
- Count Basie - piano (tracks 2–3 & 5–12), organ (tracks 1–12)
- Reunald Jones (track 2), Joe Newman (tracks 3 & 5–12) - trumpet
- Henry Coker - trombone (track 2)
- Marshall Royal - clarinet (track 2)
- Paul Quinichette - tenor saxophone (tracks 2–12)
- Charlie Fowlkes - baritone saxophone (track 2)
- Oscar Peterson - piano (track 1)
- Freddie Green - guitar (all tracks)
- Ray Brown (track 1), Gene Ramey (tracks 2–12) - bass
- Gus Johnson (track 1), Buddy Rich (tracks 2–12) - drums
- Ernie Wilkins - arranger (track 2)
