= Chairman of the Board (album) =

Studio album by Count Basie
- Released: April 18, 1959
- Recorded: March 4, April 28–29 and December 10–11, 1958
- Studio: Universal, Chicago; Capitol, New York
- Genre: Jazz
- Length: 42:24
- Label: Roulette
- Producer: Teddy Reig

Count Basie chronology
Memories Ad-Lib (1958)	Chairman of the Board (1959)	Basie One More Time (1959)

Professional ratings
Review scores
Source	Rating
AllMusic	4.5/5 stars

The Chairman of the Board is a 1959 studio album by Count Basie and his orchestra.

== Track listing ==
1. "Blues in Hoss' Flat" (Count Basie, Frank Foster) – 3:13
2. "H.R.H. (Her Royal Highness)" (Count Basie, Thad Jones) – 2:40
3. "Segue in C" (Frank Wess) – 6:15
4. "Kansas City Shout" (Henry Wells) – 3:34
5. "Speaking of Sounds" (Thad Jones) – 3:27
6. "TV Time" (Frank Foster) – 3:16
7. "Who, Me?" (Frank Foster) – 5:13
8. "The Deacon" (Thad Jones) – 4:50
9. "Half Moon Street" (Frank Wess) – 3:25
10. "Mutt & Jeff" (Thad Jones, Jack McDuff) – 3:39
11. "Fair and Warmer" (Harry James, Ernie Wilkins) – 3:35 Bonus track on CD reissue
12. "Moten Swing" (Bennie Moten, Buster Moten) – 4:51 Bonus track on CD reissue
- Recorded at Universal Studios, Chicago, on March 4, 1958 (tracks 1 & 2) and Capitol Studios, New York, on April 28 (tracks 7, 9, 12), April 29 (tracks 4, 10, 11), December 10 (tracks 5 & 8) and December 11 (tracks 3 & 6), 1958.

== Personnel ==
The Count Basie Orchestra

- Count Basie - piano
- Frank Foster - arranger, tenor saxophone
- Ernie Wilkins - arranger
- Eddie Jones - double bass
- Charlie Fowlkes - bass clarinet, baritone saxophone
- Marshal Royal - clarinet, alto saxophone
- Sonny Payne - drums
- Frank Wess - flute, arranger, alto saxophone
- Freddie Green - guitar
- Billy Mitchell - tenor saxophone
- Henry Coker - trombone
- Al Grey - trombone
- Benny Powell - trombone
- Thad Jones - trumpet, arranger
- Wendell Culley - trumpet
- Joe Newman - trumpet
- Snooky Young - trumpet
