= Ella and Basie! =

Studio album by Ella Fitzgerald and Count Basie
- Released: September 1963
- Recorded: July 15–16, 1963
- Studio: A & R (New York)
- Genre: Jazz
- Length: 40:57
- Label: Verve; V-4061
- Producer: Norman Granz

Ella Fitzgerald chronology
Ella Fitzgerald Sings the Jerome Kern Songbook (1963)	Ella and Basie! (1963)	These Are the Blues (1963)

Count Basie chronology
Li'l Ol' Groovemaker...Basie! (1963)	Ella and Basie! (1963)	Basie Land (1963)

Ella and Basie! is a 1963 studio album by Ella Fitzgerald, accompanied by Count Basie and his orchestra, with arrangements by Quincy Jones. It was later reissued with slightly different cover art as On the Sunny Side of the Street.

== Overview ==
Professional ratings
Review scores
Source	Rating
AllMusic	4.5/5 stars
The Penguin Guide to Jazz Recordings	3.5/4 stars

Fitzgerald and the Basie band had recorded together once before, on the 1957 album One O'Clock Jump.

This album is revered alongside Clap Hands, Here Comes Charlie! (1961), Ella Fitzgerald Sings Songs from Let No Man Write My Epitaph (1960), Sings the George and Ira Gershwin Songbook (1959), and Ella in Hollywood (1961) as one of Ella's greatest recordings. The album was rated the 175th best album of the 1960s by Pitchfork.

== Track listing ==
For the 1963 Verve LP album, Verve V6-4061

Side One:

1. "Honeysuckle Rose" (Andy Razaf, Fats Waller) – 2:42
2. "'Deed I Do" (Walter Hirsch, Fred Rose) – 2:40
3. "Into Each Life Some Rain Must Fall" (Doris Fisher, Allan Roberts) – 3:20
4. "Them There Eyes" (Maceo Pinkard, Doris Tauber, William Tracey) – 5:04
5. "Dream a Little Dream of Me" (Fabian Andre, Gus Kahn, Wilbur Schwandt) – 4:04
6. "Tea for Two" (Irving Caesar, Vincent Youmans) – 3:10

Side Two:

7. "Satin Doll" (Duke Ellington, Johnny Mercer, Billy Strayhorn) – 3:13
8. "I'm Beginning to See the Light" (Ellington, Don George, Johnny Hodges, Harry James) – 3:57
9. "Shiny Stockings" (Frank Foster, Ella Fitzgerald) – 3:30
10. "This Is My Last Affair" (Haven Johnson) – 3:11
11. "Ain't Misbehavin'" (Harry Brooks, Razaf, Waller) – 3:06
12. "On the Sunny Side of the Street" (Dorothy Fields, Jimmy McHugh) – 3:00

Bonus Tracks; Issued on the 1997 Verve CD Reissue, Verve 539 059-2

13. "My Last Affair" (Alternative take) – 3:26
14. "My Last Affair" (Alternative take) – 3:39
15. "Robbins Nest" (Breakdown) (Illinois Jacquet, Bob Russell, Sir Charles Thompson) – 1:22
16. "Robbins Nest" (Previously unreleased) – 3:40
17. "Robbins Nest" (Alternative take) – 3:09
18. "Robbins Nest" (Alternative take) – 2:55

== Personnel ==
- Ella Fitzgerald – vocals
- The Count Basie Orchestra:
- Count Basie – piano, organ
- Sonny Cohn, Al Aarons, Joe Newman, Don Rader – trumpet
- Eric Dixon – flute, tenor saxophone
- Frank Foster, Frank Wess – flute, alto saxophone, tenor saxophone
- Charlie Fowlkes – baritone saxophone
- Freddie Green – guitar
- Benny Powell, Urbie Green, Henry Coker, Grover Mitchell – trombone
- Flip Ricard – trombone, trumpet
- Marshal Royal – clarinet, alto saxophone
- Buddy Catlett – double bass
- Sonny Payne – drums
- Quincy Jones – Arrangements
- Val Valentin – recording engineer
- Jay Thompson – cover photo
