= Count Basie/Sarah Vaughan =

Studio album by Sarah Vaughan
- Released: 1961
- Recorded: July 19, 1960, and January 10–13, 1961
- Studio: Capitol, New York City
- Genre: Vocal jazz
- Length: 46:43
- Label: Roulette
- Producer: Teddy Reig

Sarah Vaughan chronology
My Heart Sings (1961)	Count Basie/Sarah Vaughan (1961)	After Hours (1961)

Count Basie chronology
Kansas City Suite (1960)	Count Basie/Sarah Vaughan (1961)	Basie at Birdland (1961)

Professional ratings
Review scores
Source	Rating
AllMusic	4/5 stars
The Rolling Stone Jazz Record Guide	3/5 stars

Count Basie/Sarah Vaughan is a 1961 album by the American jazz singer Sarah Vaughan, accompanied by the Count Basie Orchestra, with arrangements by Frank Foster, Thad Jones and Ernie Wilkins. According to James Gavin's liner notes to the 1996 CD release, Basie himself does not perform on any of the tracks.

The original LP was part of Roulette Records' Birdland Series, "which takes its name from the world-renowned jazz nightclub," according to the back cover notes.

== Track listing ==
1. "Perdido" (Ervin Drake, Hans J. Lengsfelder, Juan Tizol) – 2:12
2. "Lover Man (Oh Where Can You Be?)" (Jimmy Davis, Ram Ramirez, James Sherman) – 3:59
3. "I Cried for You" (Gus Arnheim, Arthur Freed, Abe Lyman) – 2:56
4. "Alone" (Nacio Herb Brown, Freed) – 3:56
5. "There Are Such Things" (George W. Meyer, Stanley Adams, Abel Baer) – 3:12
6. "Mean to Me" (Fred E. Ahlert, Roy Turk) – 2:51
7. "The Gentleman Is a Dope" (Oscar Hammerstein II, Richard Rodgers) – 2:46
8. "You Go to My Head" (J. Fred Coots, Haven Gillespie) – 4:53
9. "Until I Met You" (Freddie Green, Don Wolf) – 3:10
10. "You Turned the Tables on Me" (Louis Alter, Sidney Mitchell) – 3:24
11. "Little Man (You've Had a Busy Day)" (Mabel Wayne, Al Hoffman, Maurice Sigler) – 4:53
  1996 CD reissue bonus tracks not included on the original 1961 release:
12. "Teach Me Tonight" (Sammy Cahn, Gene de Paul, arr. Ernie Wilkins) (with Joe Williams) – 2:53
13. "If I Were a Bell" (Frank Loesser) (with Joe Williams) – 2:45
14. "Until I Met You" – 2:48

All tracks arranged by Thad Jones, except "Little Man (You've Had a Busy Day)" by Frank Foster and "Teach Me Tonight" by Ernie Wilkins.

== Personnel ==
- Sarah Vaughan – vocal

The Count Basie Orchestra

- Sonny Cohn – trumpet
- Joe Newman – trumpet, solo on Mean to Me
- Snooky Young – trumpet
- Thad Jones – trumpet, arranger
- Henry Coker – trombone
- Al Grey – trombone
- Benny Powell – trombone
- Marshal Royal – clarinet, alto saxophone
- Frank Wess – flute, alto saxophone, tenor saxophone
- Frank Foster – arranger, tenor saxophone
- Billy Mitchell – tenor saxophone, solo on I Cried for You
- Charlie Fowlkes – baritone saxophone
- Freddie Green – guitar
- Eddie Jones – double bass
- Sonny Payne – drums
- Kirk Stuart – piano
- Joe Williams – vocal (12, 13)
- Ernie Wilkins – arranger
- Thad Jones
- Teddy Reig – producer
