= Basie Land =

Studio album by Count Basie
- Released: 1964
- Recorded: February 5–6, 1964
- Genre: Jazz
- Label: Verve

Count Basie chronology
Ella and Basie! (1963)	Basie Land (1964)	It Might as Well Be Swing (1964)

Professional ratings
Review scores
Source	Rating
AllMusic	4/5 stars
Record Mirror	4/5 stars

Basie Land is a 1964 studio album by Count Basie and his orchestra, of music composed and arranged by Billy Byers.

== Track listing ==
1. "Basie Land" – 2:16
2. "Big Brother" – 3:43
3. "Count Me In" – 4:32
4. "Wanderlust" – 2:38
5. "Instant Blues" – 4:54
6. "Rabble Rouser" – 3:08
7. "Sassy" – 3:21
8. "Gymnastics" – 2:29
9. "Yuriko" – 4:13
10. "Doodle-Oodle" – 3:16

All music composed by Billy Byers.

== Personnel ==
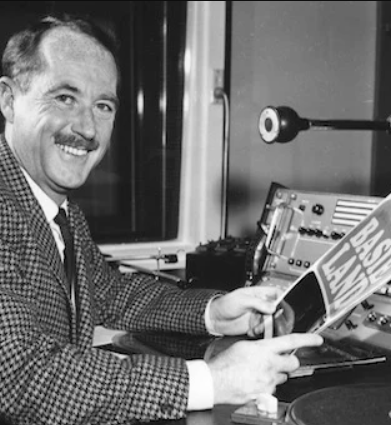
Radio broadcaster Arch McKirdy with a copy

The Count Basie Orchestra

- Count Basie - piano
- Al Aarons - trumpet
- Sonny Cohn
- Don Rader
- Snooky Young
- Henry Coker - trombone
- Urbie Green
- Grover Mitchell
- Benny Powell
- Marshal Royal - clarinet, alto saxophone
- Frank Foster - flute, alto saxophone, tenor saxophone
- Frank Wess
- Charlie Fowlkes - baritone saxophone
- Freddie Green - guitar
- Buddy Catlett - double bass
- Sonny Payne - drums
- Billy Byers - arranger, conductor
