= Sinatra–Basie: An Historic Musical First =

Sinatra-Basie: An Historic Musical First

Studio album by Frank Sinatra
- Released: December 10, 1962 (LP); June 20, 1988 (CD)
- Recorded: October 2–3, 1962
- Studios: United Recording, Hollywood, California
- Genres: Vocal jazz, jazz
- Length: 33:05
- Labels: Reprise; FS 1008

Frank Sinatra chronology
Sinatra Sings of Love and Things (1962)	Sinatra-Basie: An Historic Musical First (1962)	The Concert Sinatra (1963)

Count Basie chronology
Basie in Sweden (1962)	Sinatra-Basie: An Historic Musical First (1962)	On My Way & Shoutin' Again! (1962)

Professional ratings
Review scores
Source	Rating
AllMusic	4/5 stars
Mojo	5/5 stars
New Record Mirror	5/5 stars

Sinatra–Basie: An Historic Musical First (a.k.a. Sinatra-Basie) is the twenty-ninth studio album by Frank Sinatra, with the Count Basie Orchestra arranged by Neal Hefti. It was released in 1962.

This was the first recording that Sinatra made with Basie. In 1964, Sinatra and Basie would make a final studio recording, It Might as Well Be Swing, orchestrated by Quincy Jones, and Sinatra's first live album, Sinatra at the Sands (1966) would feature the Basie band.

Sinatra appeared on an episode of The Dinah Shore Show that aired on December 9, 1962, the day before Sinatra-Basie was released, and performed the album's arrangement of "Please Be Kind".

According to Will Friedwald's book Sinatra! The Song Is You, Basie was unfamiliar with some of the new material and "was a capable but not an expert reader [of sheet music]" quoting Sinatra's longtime pianist Bill Miller. Thus, Basie asked Miller to perform piano on "Pennies from Heaven."

== Track listing ==
1. "Pennies from Heaven" (Arthur Johnston, Johnny Burke) – 3:29
2. "Please Be Kind" (Saul Chaplin, Sammy Cahn) – 2:43
3. "(Love Is) The Tender Trap" (Cahn, Jimmy Van Heusen) – 2:37
4. "Looking at the World Through Rose Colored Glasses" (Jimmy Steiger, Tommy Mailie) – 2:32
5. "My Kind of Girl" (Leslie Bricusse) – 4:37
6. "I Only Have Eyes for You" (Harry Warren, Al Dubin) – 3:31
7. "Nice Work If You Can Get It" (George Gershwin, Ira Gershwin) – 2:37
8. "Learnin' the Blues" (Dolores Vicki Silvers) – 4:25
9. "I'm Gonna Sit Right Down and Write Myself a Letter" (Fred Ahlert, Joe Young) – 2:36
10. "I Won't Dance" (Jerome Kern, Jimmy McHugh, Oscar Hammerstein II, Dorothy Fields, Otto Harbach) – 4:07

== Personnel ==
- Frank Sinatra – vocals
- Count Basie – piano
- Bill Miller – piano
- Eric Dixon – flute, tenor saxophone
- Frank Wess – flute, alto saxophone, tenor saxophone
- Frank Foster – tenor saxophone
- Marshall Royal – clarinet, alto saxophone
- Charlie Fowlkes – baritone saxophone
- Al Aarons – trumpet
- Sonny Cohn – trumpet
- Thad Jones – trumpet
- Al Porcino – trumpet
- Fip Ricard – trumpet
- Henry Coker – trombone
- Benny Powell – trombone
- Rufus Wagner – trombone
- Buddy Catlett – bass
- Freddie Green – guitar
- Sonny Payne – drums
