= One O'Clock Jump (album) =

Studio album by Count Basie, Ella Fitzgerald and Joe Williams
- Released: 1957
- Recorded: January 4–5, June 25–27, 1956 at Fine Sound, New York City; April 23–30, 1957 in Hollywood, Los Angeles
- Genre: Jazz
- Length: 49:51
- Label: Verve MG V-8288
- Producer: Norman Granz

Count Basie chronology
Basie in London (1956)	One O'Clock Jump (1957)	Count Basie at Newport (1963)

Ella Fitzgerald chronology
Like Someone in Love (1957)	One O'Clock Jump (1957)	Ella Swings Lightly (1957)

Joe Williams chronology
A Night at Count Basie's (1956)	One O'Clock Jump (1957)	A Man Ain't Supposed to Cry (1959)

One O'Clock Jump is a 1957 album by the Count Basie Orchestra, arranged by Ernie Wilkins and featuring vocalist Joe Williams on seven of the ten tracks.

Ella Fitzgerald is featured in duet with Williams on the first track, "Too Close for Comfort", arranged by Edgar Sampson. "One O'Clock Jump", "Jamboree" and "From Coast to Coast" are instrumentals by the Count Basie Orchestra.

The 1999 reissue included two additional versions of "One O'Clock Jump" as well as an alternate take of "Too Close for Comfort" sung by Williams without Fitzgerald.

== Reception ==
Professional ratings
Review scores
Source	Rating
AllMusic	3/5 stars
The Rolling Stone Jazz Record Guide	4/5 stars

Bruce Eder, writing on AllMusic said the album compared unfavorably to Basie and Williams' previous records April In Paris, and The Greatest!! Count Basie Plays, Joe Williams Sings Standards, but praised "From Coast to Coast" and "One O'Clock Jump", and Williams' performance on "Stop, Pretty Baby, Stop".

== Track listing ==
1. "Too Close for Comfort" (Jerry Bock, Larry Holofcener, George David Weiss) – 3:02
2. "Smack Dab in the Middle" (Chuck Calhoun) – 3:36
3. "Amazing Love" (Jeannie Burns) – 3:28
4. "Only Forever" (Johnny Burke, James V. Monaco) – 3:34
5. "Don't Worry 'Bout Me" (Rube Bloom, Ted Koehler) – 3:01
6. "Stop, Pretty Baby" (Milton Lovett, Red Saunders, Leon Washington) – 3:04
7. "One O'Clock Jump" (Count Basie) – 4:29
8. "Jamboree" (Ernie Wilkins) – 4:56
9. "I Don't Like You No More" (Cirino Colacrai, Teddy Randazzo) – 2:37
10. "From Coast to Coast" (Wilkins) – 8:31

Bonus Tracks; Issued on the Verve 1999 CD re-issue, Verve 559 806-2

11. "Too Close for Comfort" (without Ella Fitzgerald) – 3:26
12. "One O'Clock Jump" (alternative take) – 2:03
13. "One O'Clock Jump" (alternative take) – 4:34

== Personnel ==
- Joe Williams - vocals (tracks 1, 2, 3, 4, 5, 6, 9 & 11)
- Ella Fitzgerald - vocals (track 1)
- Ernie Wilkins, Edgar Sampson - arranger
- The Count Basie Orchestra:
  - Count Basie - piano
  - Henry Coker, Benny Powell, Bill Hughes - trombone
  - Wendell Culley, Reunald Jones, Thad Jones, Joe Newman - trumpet
  - Frank Foster - tenor saxophone
  - Charlie Fowlkes - baritone saxophone
  - Bill Graham - alto saxophone
  - Marshal Royal - clarinet, alto saxophone
  - Frank Wess - flute, tenor saxophone
  - Freddie Green - guitar
  - Eddie Jones - double bass
  - Sonny Payne - drums

Production

- Sung Lee - artwork (series art directed and designed by)
- Suzanne White - design (coordinated by)
- Nat Hentoff - original liner notes
- Hakim Bhasdachik - mastering
- Herman Leonard - cover photographs
- Tom Greenwood - reissue production coordination
- Carlos Kase - reissue production coordination assistance
- Ben Young - restoration research technician
- Bryan Koniarz - reissue supervision
