= Basie in London =

Live album by Count Basie
- Released: 1956
- Recorded: September 7, 1956
- Venue: Gothenburg, Sweden
- Genre: Jazz
- Length: 42:24
- Label: Verve

Count Basie chronology
| Hall of Fame (1956) | Basie in London (1956) | One O'Clock Jump (1957) |

Professional ratings
Review scores
| Source | Rating |
|---|---|
| AllMusic | 4/5 stars |

Basie in London is a 1956 live album by Count Basie and his orchestra, recorded (despite the inaccurate album title) in Gothenburg, Sweden.

== Track listing ==
1. "Jumpin' at the Woodside" (Count Basie, Jon Hendricks) – 3:38
2. "Shiny Stockings" (Frank Foster) – 5:19
3. "How High the Moon" (Nancy Hamilton, Morgan Lewis) – 3:37
4. "Nails" (Buster Harding) – 6:24
5. "Flute Juice" (Ernie Wilkins) – 3:09
6. "One O'Clock Jump" (Basie, Eddie Durham) – 1:39
7. "Alright, Okay, You Win" (Mayme Watts, Sidney Wyche) – 2:50
8. "Roll 'Em Pete" (Pete Johnson, Big Joe Turner) – 2:32
9. "The Comeback" (Charles Frazier) – 4:08
10. "Blues Backstage" (Foster) – 4:27
11. "Corner Pocket" (Freddie Green, Donald Wolf) – 4:45
12. "Blee Blop Blues" (A. K. Salim) – 2:26
13. "Yesterdays" (Otto Harbach, Jerome Kern) – 3:16 (bonus track on CD reissue)
14. "Untitled" – 5:11 (bonus track on CD reissue)
15. "Sixteen Men Swinging" (Wilkins) – 2:48 (bonus track on CD reissue)
16. "Plymouth Rock" (Neal Hefti) – 6:11 (bonus track on CD reissue)

== Personnel ==
- Count Basie – piano

The Count Basie Orchestra

- Frank Foster – reeds
- Charlie Fowlkes – reeds
- Bill Graham – reeds
- Marshal Royal – reeds
- Frank Wess – reeds
- Henry Coker – trombone
- Matthew Gee – trombone
- Benny Powell – trombone
- Wendell Culley – trumpet
- Reunald Jones – trumpet
- Thad Jones – trumpet
- Joe Newman – trumpet
- Freddie Green – guitar
- Eddie Jones – bass
- Sonny Payne – drums
- Joe Williams – vocals

== Additional information ==
The album was recorded live in Gothenburg, Sweden, on September 7, 1956, during a tour that did not involve any UK dates due to the ongoing AFM/MU dispute between the American Federation of Musicians and the British Musicians' Union. It was released to capitalise on the extensive string of UK tour dates during the spring of 1957. It also helped the Basie Band to catch up in Britain, preparing the ground for the forthcoming 'Atomic' recordings.

The Basie Was Here EP (SEB10083) featuring part of the same cover shot was released for the same purpose, as had been the Basie's Back in Town EP (SEB10070). The latter's sleeve note name checks the April 1957 British dates despite none of these tunes being from the tour.

The cover shot was taken outside the Lambeth Walk Public House, an Ind Coope pub in Lambeth Road, South London. The photograph itself was taken after a matinee concert at the Royal Festival Hall while the band were waiting for their evening gig at the Ritz Hotel in the evening, on April 13, 1957.

The couple arm in arm with Basie on the LP sleeve, according to Al Ryan of BBC Radio 3 Jazz Now, were David and Janet Woodhead. Janet was a pub pianist and played in the Lambeth Walk pub (on the piano featured on the back of the LP).

The Lambeth Walk ceased trading as a pub in 2010, though the building is still there at 17 Lambeth Road.
