= Count Basie at Newport =

Live album by Count Basie and his orchestra
- Released: Early November 1957
- Recorded: July 7, 1957
- Venue: Newport Jazz Festival, Freebody Park, Newport, Rhode Island
- Genre: Jazz
- Length: 54:11
- Label: Verve; MG VS-6024 (1957); MGV 8243 (1958)
- Producer: Norman Granz

Count Basie and his orchestra chronology
One O'Clock Jump (1957)	Count Basie at Newport (1957)	The Atomic Mr. Basie (1957)

Count Basie at Newport is a live album by jazz musician Count Basie and his orchestra. It was originally issued as Verve MGV 8243 and included only the tracks 1–7 and 13. Tracks 9–12 originally included in Count Basie & Joe Williams/Dizzy Gillespie & Mary Lou Williams at Newport (Verve MGV 8244).

== Reception ==
Professional ratings
Review scores
Source	Rating
AllMusic	5/5 stars
Disc	5/5 stars

The AllMusic review by Scott Yanow awarded the album five stars and said that "At the 1957 Newport Jazz Festival, the music was consistently inspired and often historic. Count Basie welcomed back tenor great Lester Young and singer Jimmy Rushing for part of a very memorable set...Young plays beautifully throughout and Rushing is in prime form. An exciting full-length version of "One O'Clock Jump" features Young, Illinois Jacquet, and trumpeter Roy Eldridge...It's a great set of music".

== Track listing ==
1. Introduction by John H. Hammond – 4:52
2. "Swingin' at the Newport" (Ernie Wilkins) – 8:30
3. "Polka Dots and Moonbeams" (Johnny Burke, Jimmy Van Heusen) – 3:33
4. "Lester Leaps In" (Lester Young) – 3:02
5. "Sent for You Yesterday and Here You Come Today" (Count Basie, Eddie Durham, Jimmy Rushing) – 4:04
6. "Boogie Woogie (I May Be Wrong)" (Basie, Rushing) – 3:49
7. "Evenin'" (Charles Daniels, Mitchell Parish, Harry White, Richard Whiting) – 3:32
8. "Blee Blop Blues" (Basie, Ahmad Kharab Salim) – 3:32 (this track was originally released on Verve MG VS-6025, Verve MGV-8244; bonus track on CD reissue)
9. "Alright, Okay, You Win" (Mayme Watts, Sid Wyche) – 2:45 (this track was originally released on Verve MG VS-6025, Verve MGV-8244; bonus track on CD reissue)
10. "The Comeback" (Charles Frazier, Memphis Slim) – 4:10 (this track was originally released on Verve MG VS-6025, Verve MGV-8244; bonus track on CD reissue)
11. "Roll 'Em Pete" (Pete Johnson, Joe Turner) – 3:00 (this track was originally released on Verve MG VS-6025, Verve MGV-8244; bonus track on CD reissue)
12. "Smack Dab in the Middle" (Eddie Calhoun) – 3:44 (this track was originally released on Verve MG VS-6025, Verve MGV-8244; bonus track on CD reissue)
13. "One O'Clock Jump" (Basie) – 9:26

== Personnel ==
- Count Basie - piano

The Count Basie Orchestra

- Wendell Culley - trumpet
- Roy Eldridge - trumpet
- Reunald Jones - trumpet
- Thad Jones - trumpet
- Joe Newman - trumpet
- Henry Coker - trombone
- Bill Hughes - trombone
- Benny Powell - trombone
- Bill Graham - alto saxophone
- Marshal Royal - alto saxophone, clarinet
- Frank Foster - tenor saxophone
- Illinois Jacquet - tenor saxophone (track 13)
- Lester Young - tenor saxophone (tracks 3–7, 13)
- Frank Wess - tenor Saxophone, flute
- Charlie Fowlkes - baritone saxophone
- Freddie Green - guitar
- Eddie Jones - bass
- Jo Jones - drums (tracks 3–7, 13)
- Sonny Payne - drums (tracks 2, 8–12)
- Jimmy Rushing - vocals (5–7)
- Joe Williams - vocals (9–12)

== See also ==
- 1957 in music
