= It Might as Well Be Swing =

Studio album by Frank Sinatra
- Released: August 1964 (LP); October 1986 (CD)
- Recorded: June 9–12, 1964, Hollywood, Los Angeles, California
- Genre: Vocal jazz, traditional pop
- Length: 27:22
- Label: Reprise; FS 1012
- Producer: Sonny Burke

Frank Sinatra chronology
Robin and the 7 Hoods (1964)	It Might as Well Be Swing (1964)	12 Songs of Christmas (1964)

Count Basie chronology
Basie Land (1963)	It Might as Well Be Swing (1964)	Our Shining Hour (1964)

Professional ratings
Review scores
Source	Rating
AllMusic	3.5/5 stars
Record Mirror	5/5 stars
The Rolling Stone Jazz Record Guide	2/5 stars

It Might as Well Be Swing is a 1964 studio album by Frank Sinatra, accompanied by Count Basie and his orchestra. It was Sinatra's first studio recording arranged by Quincy Jones.

== Overview ==
The recording of "Fly Me to the Moon" which appears on this album has become one of Sinatra's most popular. This was Sinatra and Basie's second collaboration after 1962's Sinatra-Basie. Sinatra's cover version of "Hello, Dolly!" on the album features a new second verse improvised by Sinatra, which pays tribute to Louis Armstrong, who had topped the Billboard charts with his own version of the song earlier in 1964. Whilst "Wives and Lovers" was in 3/4 time, the performance in the album was in 4/4 time; according to Bacharach, the record's producer Quincy Jones said "the Basie band can't play in 3/4." It Might as Well Be Swing is a reference to the title of the well known jazz standard "It Might as Well Be Spring".

== Chart performance ==
The album debuted on Billboard magazine's Top LP's chart in the issue dated August 22, 1964, peaking at No. 13 during a thirty-one-week run on the chart. It entered Cashbox magazine's Top Albums chart in the issue dated August 15, 1964, peaking at No. 13 on the Top Monaural Albums chart during a nineteen-week run on it. The album reached No. 15 on the Top Stereo Albums chart during the same-week run on it. In the UK the album reached a lower position of No. 17.

== Reception ==
The initial Record World magazine review stated that "Frank and Count Basie make a stunning combination", continuing "and along with Quincy Jones arrangements, they can't be bettered. The sound is brassy and upbeat." The Record Mirror review stated that Sinatra is "better than ever on this Quincy Jones-arranged set, with his work on 'Can't Stop Loving You' just about the last word in intelligent interpretation," noting "This swings for every groove of the way. So does the whole album."

The retrospective by review Stephen Thomas Erlewine on AllMusic stated that "It Might as Well Be Swing, was a more structured, swing-oriented set than Sinatra-Basie, and in many ways the superior album." He also said that "Both Basie and Sinatra manage to play with the melodies and the beat, even though the album never loses sight of its purpose as a swing album. However, what makes It Might as Well Be Swing more successful is the consistently high level of the performances."

== Track listing ==
Side one
No.	Title	Writer(s)	Length
1.	"Fly Me to the Moon (In Other Words)"	Bart Howard	2:30
2.	"I Wish You Love"	Léo Chauliac, Charles Trenet, Albert Beach	2:56
3.	"I Believe in You"	Frank Loesser	2:21
4.	"More (Theme from Mondo Cane)"	Riz Ortolani, Nino Oliviero, Marcello Ciorciolini, Norman Newell	3:05
5.	"I Can't Stop Loving You"	Don Gibson	3:00

Side two
No.	Title	Writer(s)	Length
6.	"Hello, Dolly!"	Jerry Herman	2:45
7.	"I Wanna Be Around"	Johnny Mercer, Sadie Vimmerstedt	2:25
8.	"The Best Is Yet to Come"	Cy Coleman, Carolyn Leigh	3:10
9.	"The Good Life"	Sacha Distel, Jack Reardon	2:30
10.	"Wives and Lovers"	Burt Bacharach, Hal David	2:50
Total length:			27:22

== Personnel ==
- Frank Sinatra – vocals
- Count Basie – piano
- Quincy Jones – arranger, conductor

The Count Basie Orchestra

- Al Porcino, Don Rader, Wallace Davenport, Al Aarons, George Cohn and Harry "Sweets" Edison – trumpets
- Henry Coker, Grover Mitchell, Bill Hughes, Henderson Chambers and Kenny Shroyer – trombones
- Frank Foster, Charles Fowlkes, Marshal Royal, Frank Wess and Eric Dixon – reeds
- Emil Richards – vibraphone
- George Catlett – double bass
- Freddie Green – guitar
- Sonny Payne – drums

Additional musicians

- Gerald Vinci, Israel Baker, Jacques Gasselin, Thelma Beach, Bonnie Douglas, Marshall Sosson, Erno Neufeld, Lou Raderman, Paul Shure and James Getzoff – violins
- Virginia Majewski, Paul Robyn, Alvin Dinkin and Stan Harris – violas
- Edgar Lustgarten and Ann Goodman – cellos
- Emil Richards – Vibes/Percussion

Production

- Sonny Burke – producer
- Lowell Frank – engineer
- Ted Allen – cover photo
- Gregg Geller – 1998 reissue producer
- Lee Herschberg – 20-bit digital mastering

== Charts ==
Chart (1964)	Peak position
UK Record Retailer Top Albums	17
US Billboard Top LPs	13
US Cashbox Top Albums	13
