= More Hits of the 50's and 60's =

Studio album by Count Basie and His Orchestra
- Released: 1963
- Recorded: April 8–11, 1963; New York City
- Genre: Jazz
- Length: 40:05
- Label: Verve; V/V6 8563

Count Basie chronology
This Time by Basie! (1963)	More Hits of the 50's and 60's (1963)	Li'l Ol' Groovemaker...Basie! (1963)

More Hits of the 50's and 60's (also released as Frankly Basie and Frankly Speaking) is an album released by pianist and bandleader Count Basie and his orchestra featuring jazz versions of songs associated with the singer Frank Sinatra recorded in 1963. It was arranged by Billy Byers and was originally released on the Verve label.

== Reception ==
Professional ratings
Review scores
Source	Rating
AllMusic	3/5 stars
Record Mirror	4/5 stars

AllMusic awarded the album 3 stars.

== Track listing ==
1. "The Second Time Around" (Jimmy Van Heusen, Sammy Cahn) - 4:34
2. "Hey! Jealous Lover" (Kay Twomey, Bee Walker, Cahn) - 2:47
3. "I'll Never Smile Again" (Ruth Lowe) - 3:32
4. "Saturday Night (Is the Loneliest Night of the Week)" (Jule Styne, Cahn) - 4:07
5. "This Love of Mine" (Sol Parker, Hank Sanicola, Frank Sinatra) - 3:09
6. "I Thought About You" (Van Heusen, Johnny Mercer) - 2:55
7. "In the Wee Small Hours of the Morning" (David Mann, Bob Hilliard) - 3:14
8. "Come Fly With Me" (Van Heusen, Cahn) - 2:43
9. "On the Road to Mandalay" (Oley Speaks, Rudyard Kipling) - 2:55
10. "Only the Lonely" (Van Heusen, Cahn) - 3:18
11. "South of the Border" (Michael Carr, Jimmy Kennedy) - 3:53
12. "All of Me" (Gerald Marks, Seymour Simons) - 3:02

== Personnel ==
- Count Basie - piano
- Al Aarons, Sonny Cohn, Rickie Fortunatus, Don Rader, Fip Ricard - trumpet
- Henry Coker, Urbie Green, Grover Mitchell, Benny Powell - trombone
- Marshal Royal - alto saxophone, clarinet
- Eric Dixon, Frank Foster, Frank Wess - tenor saxophone, alto saxophone, flute
- Charlie Fowlkes - baritone saxophone
- Freddie Green - guitar
- Buddy Catlett - bass
- Sonny Payne - drums
- Billy Byers - arranger, conductor

== Charts ==
Chart (1964)	Peak position
US Billboard Top LPs	150
