= Metronome All-Stars 1956 =

Studio album by Metronome All-Stars
- Released: 1956
- Recorded: June 18, 25 & 27, 1956
- Studio: Fine Sound, New York City
- Genre: Jazz
- Label: Clef; MG C-743
- Producer: Norman Granz

Count Basie chronology
The Greatest!! Count Basie Plays, Joe Williams Sings Standards (1956)	Metronome All-Stars 1956 (1956)	Hall of Fame (1956)

Ella Fitzgerald chronology
Ella Fitzgerald Sings the Cole Porter Song Book (1956)	Metronome All-Stars 1956 (1956)	Ella and Louis (1956)

Metronome All-Stars 1956 was the final album by the Metronome All-Stars, a loose amalgamation of musicians representing winners of Metronome magazine's annual poll. This 1956 release contains four tracks documenting the first collaboration between pianist/bandleader Count Basie and vocalist Ella Fitzgerald. The album was originally released on the Clef label in 1956.

== Reception ==
Professional ratings
Review scores
Source	Rating
AllMusic	4/5 stars

AllMusic awarded the album 4 stars stating "This would be the final recording by The Metronome All-Stars (a series that started in the late '30s) and the music on this LP still sounds exciting and joyful".

== Track listing ==
1. "Billie's Bounce" (Charlie Parker) – 20:30
2. "April in Paris" (Vernon Duke, Yip Harburg) – 4:43
3. "Every Day I Have the Blues" (Peter Chatman, William York) – 5:11
4. "Party Blues" (Count Basie, Joe Williams, Ella Fitzgerald) – 3:59
5. "Basie's Back in Town" (Ernie Wilkins) – 3:16
6. "Lady Fair" (George Wallington) – 2:55
- Recorded at Fine Sound in New York City on June 18 (tracks 1 & 6), June 25 (tracks 2–4) and June 27 (track 5), 1956

== Personnel ==
- Ella Fitzgerald (tracks 2, 3 & 4), Joe Williams (tracks 3 & 4) – vocals
- Count Basie (tracks 2–5), Billy Taylor (track 1), George Wallington (track 6) – piano
- Wendell Culley (tracks 2, 3 & 5), Reunald Jones (tracks 2, 3 & 5), Thad Jones (tracks 1–5), Joe Newman (tracks 2–5) – trumpet
- Eddie Bert (track 1), Henry Coker (tracks 2–5), Bill Hughes (tracks 2, 3 & 5), Benny Powell (tracks 2, 3 & 5) – trombone
- Marshall Royal – alto saxophone, clarinet (tracks 2, 3 & 5)
- Tony Scott – clarinet (track 1)
- Bill Graham (tracks 2, 3 & 5), Lee Konitz (track 1) – alto saxophone
- Frank Wess – alto saxophone, tenor saxophone, flute (tracks 2–5)
- Al Cohn (track 1), Frank Foster (tracks 2, 3 & 5), Zoot Sims (track 1) – tenor saxophone
- Serge Chaloff (track 1), Charlie Fowlkes (tracks 2, 3 & 5) – baritone saxophone
- Teddy Charles – vibraphone (track 1)
- Tal Farlow (track 1), Freddie Green (tracks 2–5) – guitar
- Eddie Jones (tracks 2–5), Charles Mingus (track 1) – bass
- Art Blakey (track 1), Sonny Payne (tracks 2–5) – drums
- Ralph Burns (tracks 2 & 3), Wild Bill Davis (track 2), Ernie Wilkins (track 5) – arranger
