= Basie One More Time =

Studio album by Count Basie
- Released: 1959
- Recorded: December 19, 1958 and January 23 & 24, 1959; New York City and Chicago
- Genre: Jazz
- Label: Roulette; SR 52024
- Producer: Teddy Reig and Rudy Traylor

Count Basie chronology
| Chairman of the Board (1959) | Basie One More Time (1959) | Breakfast Dance and Barbecue (1959) |

Basie One More Time (subtitled Music from the Pen of Quincy Jones) is an album by pianist and bandleader Count Basie performing the compositions and arrangements of Quincy Jones recorded in late 1958 and early 1959 and originally released on the Roulette label.

== Reception ==
Professional ratings
Review scores
| Source | Rating |
|---|---|
| AllMusic | 2.5/5 stars |

AllMusic's review states, "Jones's charts helped expand the Basie sound without altering it. An excellent CD".

== Track listing ==
All compositions by Quincy Jones

1. "For Lena and Lennie" - 3:57
2. "Rat Race" - 2:57
3. "Quince" - 3:55
4. "Meet B B" - 3:35
5. "The Big Walk" - 2:55
6. "A Square at the Roundtable" - 2:16
7. "I Needs to Be Bee'd With" - 3:29
8. "Jessica's Day" - 4:24
9. "The Midnite Sun Never Sets" - 3:34
10. "Muttnik" - 5:25
- Recorded in New York City on December 19, 1958 (tracks 1, 2, 4, 5 & 9) and Chicago on January 23 & 24, 1959 (tracks 3, 6, 7, 8 & 10)

== Personnel ==
- Count Basie - piano
- Wendell Culley, Thad Jones, Joe Newman, Snooky Young - trumpet
- Henry Coker, Al Grey, Benny Powell - trombone
- Marshal Royal - alto saxophone, clarinet
- Frank Wess - alto saxophone, tenor saxophone, flute
- Frank Foster, Billy Mitchell - tenor saxophone
- Charlie Fowlkes - baritone saxophone
- Freddie Green - guitar
- Eddie Jones - bass
- Sonny Payne - drums
- Quincy Jones - composition, arranger
