= Breakfast Dance and Barbecue =

Live album by Count Basie and His Orchestra with Joe Williams
- Released: 1959
- Recorded: May 31, 1959
- Venue: The Americana Hotel (Miami, Florida)
- Genre: Jazz
- Length: 74:22 CD reissue with bonus tracks
- Label: Roulette; SR 52028
- Producer: Teddy Reig

Count Basie chronology
Chairman of the Board (1959)	Breakfast Dance and Barbecue (1959)	Basie/Eckstine Incorporated (1959)

Breakfast Dance and Barbecue is a live album by pianist, composer and bandleader Count Basie and his Orchestra with vocalist Joe Williams featuring tracks recorded at a Disc Jockey convention in Florida in 1959 and originally released on the Roulette label.

== Reception ==
Professional ratings
Review scores
Source	Rating
AllMusic	3/5 stars
The Penguin Guide to Jazz Recordings	3.5/4 stars

AllMusic awarded the album 3 stars and its review by Scott Yanow states, "Their first of three sets took place at 2 a.m. but the late hour if anything kept the band loose".

== Track listing ==
1. "The Deacon" (Thad Jones) – 5:52 Bonus track on CD reissue
2. "Cute" (Neal Hefti) – 4:09 Bonus track on CD reissue
3. "In a Mellow Tone" (Duke Ellington, Milt Gabler) – 6:53
4. "No Moon at All" (David Mann, Redd Evans) – 2:57 Bonus track on CD reissue
5. "Cherry Red" (Pete Johnson, Big Joe Turner) – 2:39 Bonus track on CD reissue
6. "Roll 'Em Pete" (Johnson, Turner) – 2:38 Bonus track on CD reissue
7. "Cherry Point" (Hefti) – 4:10 Bonus track on CD reissue
8. "Splanky" (Hefti) – 4:15 Bonus track on CD reissue
9. "Counter Block" (Jones) – 4:34 Bonus track on CD reissue
10. "Li'l Darlin'" (Hefti) – 4:07 Bonus track on CD reissue
11. "Who, Me?" (Frank Foster) – 3:59
12. "Five O'Clock in the Morning" (Joe Williams) – 2:53
13. "Every Day I Have the Blues" (Memphis Slim) – 3:48 Bonus track on CD reissue
14. "Back to the Apple" (Count Basie, Frank Foster) – 5:33 Bonus track on CD reissue
15. "Let's Have a Taste" (Snooky Young) – 4:17
16. "Moten Swing" (Bennie Moten, Buster Moten) – 5:17
17. "Hallelujah I Love Her So" (Ray Charles) – 2:36
18. "One O'Clock Jump" (Count Basie) – 3:45

== Personnel ==
- Count Basie – piano
- Joe Williams – vocals
- Wendell Culley, Thad Jones, Joe Newman, Snooky Young – trumpet
- Henry Coker, Al Grey, Benny Powell – trombone
- Marshal Royal, Frank Wess – alto saxophone
- Frank Foster, Billy Mitchell – tenor saxophone
- Charlie Fowlkes – baritone saxophone
- Freddie Green – guitar
- Eddie Jones – bass
- Sonny Payne – drums
- Harry Edison – trumpet (track 18)
