= Everyday I Have the Blues (Joe Williams album) =

Studio album by Joe Williams with Count Basie & His Orchestra
- Released: 1959
- Recorded: September 19, 1957, and September 24, 1959; Capitol Studios, New York City and Universal Recording, Chicago
- Genre: Jazz
- Length: 39:20
- Label: Roulette; SR 52033
- Producer: Teddy Reig

Count Basie chronology
Breakfast Dance and Barbecue (1959)	Everyday I Have the Blues (1959)	Dance Along with Basie (1959)

Joe Williams chronology
A Man Ain't Supposed to Cry (1958)	Everyday I Have the Blues (1959)	Joe Williams Sings About You! (1959)

Everyday I Have the Blues is an album by singer Joe Williams with Count Basie and His Orchestra featuring tracks recorded in 1959 (with one track from 1957 on the original LP) which was originally released on the Roulette label.

== Reception ==
Professional ratings
Review scores
Source	Rating
AllMusic	4/5 stars
DownBeat	4/5 stars

AllMusic awarded the album 4 stars and its review by John Bush states, "Joe Williams had enlivened the Count Basie band for so long that it was natural for Basie and company to return the favor on his 1959 solo LP for Roulette. And with a trio of Basie arrangers – Frank Foster, Ernie Wilkins, Thad Jones – providing charts for a rather small group here, the results are excellent".

In DownBeat, Ralph Gleason finds "the Basie band really shining as an accompanying instrument" and argues this is Williams' "best album under his own name."

== Track listing ==
1. "Everyday" (William York) – 4:43
2. "Baby Won't You Please Come Home" (Charles Warfield, Clarence Williams) – 1:58
3. "Going to Chicago Blues" (Count Basie, Jimmy Rushing) – 4:08 (this track was originally released on Sing Along With Basie; not on CD reissue)
4. "Gee, Baby, Ain't I Good to You" (Andy Razaf, Don Redman) – 2:28
5. "It's a Low Down Dirty Shame" (Ollie Shepard) – 5:23
6. "Shake, Rattle and Roll" (Charles Calhoun) – 2:14
7. "Just a Dream" (Big Bill Broonzy) – 2:53
8. "Cherry Red" (Pete Johnson) – 2:53
9. "Good Mornin' Blues" (Basie, Eddie Durham, Rushing) – 2:51
10. "What Did You Win" (Sid Wyche, R. Watts) – 2:17
11. "Ain't No Use" (Wyche, Leroy Kirkland) – 2:56
12. "Confessin' the Blues" (Jay McShann, Walter Brown) – 2:48 (bonus track on CD reissue)
13. "Five O'Clock in the Morning" (Joe Williams) – 3:15 (bonus track on CD reissue)
14. "How Can You Lose" (Benny Carter) – 2:34 (bonus track on CD reissue)
- Recorded on September 19, 1957, at Capitol Studios in New York City (tracks 4 & 12), and at Universal Studios in Chicago on March 4, 1958 (tracks 13 & 14) and September 24 & 25, 1959 (tracks 1–2 & 5–11)

== Personnel ==
- Joe Williams – vocals
- Count Basie – piano
- John Anderson (tracks 1–2 & 5–11), Wendell Culley (tracks 4 & 12–14), Thad Jones, Joe Newman, Snooky Young – trumpet
- Henry Coker, Al Grey (tracks 1–2, 5–11, 13 & 14), Bill Hughes (tracks 13 & 14), Benny Powell – trombone
- Marshal Royal – alto saxophone, clarinet
- Frank Wess – alto saxophone, tenor saxophone, flute
- Eddie "Lockjaw" Davis (tracks 4 & 12), Frank Foster, Billy Mitchell (tracks 1–2, 5–11, 13 & 14) – tenor saxophone
- Charlie Fowlkes – baritone saxophone
- Freddie Green – guitar
- Eddie Jones – bass
- Sonny Payne – drums
