= Basie (album) =

Studio album by Count Basie
- Released: 1955
- Recorded: August 16 & 17, 1954; Fine Sound, New York City
- Genre: Jazz
- Label: Clef; MG C-666
- Producer: Norman Granz

Count Basie chronology
Dance Session Album#2 (1954)	Basie (1955)	Count Basie Swings, Joe Williams Sings (1955)

The Band of Distinction cover

Basie (reissued as The Band of Distinction) is an album by pianist/bandleader Count Basie recorded in 1954 and originally released on the Clef label. the album should not be confused with Basie's 1958 album which became known as The Atomic Mr. Basie.

== Reception ==
Professional ratings
Review scores
Source	Rating
AllMusic	3/5 stars

AllMusic awarded the album 3 stars.

== Track listing ==
1. "Blues Backstage" (Frank Foster) - 4:36
2. "Down for the Count" (Foster) - 6:02
3. "Eventide" (Bill Doggett) - 4:40
4. "Ain't Misbehavin'" (Fats Waller, Andy Razaf, Harry Brooks) - 3:43
5. "Perdido" (Juan Tizol) - 4:55
6. "Ska-Di-Dle-Dee-Bee-Doo" (Neal Hefti) - 3:37
7. "Two Franks" (Hefti) - 3:16
8. "Rails" (Dizzy Gillespie, Buster Harding) - 5:57

== Personnel ==
- Count Basie - piano, organ
- Wendell Culley, Reunald Jones, Thad Jones, Joe Newman - trumpet
- Henry Coker, Benny Powell - trombone
- Bill Hughes - trombone, piano
- Marshall Royal - alto saxophone, clarinet
- Ernie Wilkins - alto saxophone, tenor saxophone, arranger
- Frank Wess - tenor saxophone
- Frank Foster - tenor saxophone, arranger
- Charlie Fowlkes - baritone saxophone
- Freddie Green - guitar
- Eddie Jones - bass
- Gus Johnson - drums
- Manny Albam, Buster Harding, Neal Hefti - arranger
