= Please Don't Do It Here =

"Please Don't Do It in Here"

Single by Billie Holiday
- Recorded: Laurie Krauz
- Genre: Jazz
- Songwriter(s): Billie Holiday; Buster Harding

"Please Don't Do It in Here" is a jazz song written by singer Billie Holiday and composer Buster Harding, and published by E.B. Marks. This is one of seven songs written by or co-written by Holiday that she never recorded. The song was finally recorded by Laurie Krauz for her cd "Catch Me If You Can," released in 2001.

Buster Harding directed a recording session for Billie on August 17, 1949, which began an association culminating in his accompanying her as pianist from 1951 to mid 1953. It was during this period that they collaborated on a number of songs, including "Please Don't Do It in Here" and "You'd Do It Anyway."
