= The Legend (Count Basie album) =

Studio album by Count Basie and His Orchestra
- Released: 1962
- Recorded: October 30 – November 2, 1961; New York City
- Genre: Jazz, big band
- Length: 33:11
- Label: Roulette
- Producer: Teddy Reig

Count Basie chronology
First Time! The Count Meets the Duke (1961)	The Legend (1962)	Count Basie and the Kansas City 7 (1962)

The Legend (subtitled From the Pen of Benny Carter) is an album by pianist, composer and bandleader Count Basie featuring tracks composed by Benny Carter recorded in 1961 and originally released on the Roulette label.

== Reception ==
Professional ratings
Review scores
Source	Rating
AllMusic	4.5/5 stars

AllMusic awarded the album 4½ out of 5 stars.

== Track listing ==
All compositions by Benny Carter

1. "The Trot" – 3:09
2. "Easy Money" – 5:19
3. "Amoroso" – 3:47
4. "Goin' On" – 4:24
5. "The Swizzle" – 3:31
6. "The Legend" – 4:35
7. "Who's Blue?" – 4:30
8. "Turnabout" – 3:56
- Recorded in New York City on October 30, 1961 (tracks 1, 4 & 6), November 1, 1961 (tracks 5 & 7), and November 2, 1961 (tracks 2, 3 & 8)

== Personnel ==
- Count Basie – piano
- Al Aarons, Sonny Cohn, Thad Jones, Snooky Young – trumpet
- Henry Coker, Quentin Jackson, Benny Powell – trombone
- Benny Carter, Frank Wess – alto saxophone
- Frank Foster, Budd Johnson – tenor saxophone
- Charlie Fowlkes – baritone saxophone
- Sam Herman – guitar
- Eddie Jones – bass
- Sonny Payne – drums
- Benny Carter – arranger
