= Basie Jazz =

Studio album by Count Basie
- Released: 1954
- Recorded: July 22 & 26 and December 12, 1952; Fine Sound, New York City
- Genre: Jazz
- Label: Clef
- Producer: Norman Granz

Count Basie chronology
The Swinging Count! (1952)	Basie Jazz (1954)	Basie Rides Again! (1952)

Basie Jazz is an album by pianist/bandleader Count Basie recorded in 1952 and released on the Clef label in 1954. Selections from this album were also released on the 1956 Clef LPs The Swinging Count! and Basie Rides Again!.

== Reception ==
Professional ratings
Review scores
Source	Rating
AllMusic	3/5 stars

AllMusic awarded the album 3 stars.

== Track listing ==
1. "Extended Blues" (Count Basie, Oscar Peterson) – 5:58
2. "Be My Guest" (Ernie Wilkins) – 3:03
3. "Blues for the Count and Oscar" (Basie, Peterson) – 3:10
4. "Oh, Lady Be Good!" (George Gershwin, Ira Gershwin) – 2:26
5. "I Want a Little Girl" (Murray Mencher, Billy Moll) – 2:54
6. "Song of the Islands" (Charles E. King) – 2:52
7. "Goin' to Chicago" (Count Basie) – 3:22
8. "Sent for You Yesterday and Here You Come Today" (Count Basie, Eddie Durham, Jimmy Rushing) – 3:13
9. "Bread" (Wilkins) – 2:33
10. "There's a Small Hotel" (Richard Rodgers, Lorenz Hart) – 3:33
11. "Tippin' on the Q. T." (Buck Clayton) – 3:33
12. "Blee-Blop Blues" (A. K. Salim) – 3:03

Recorded at Fine Sound Studios in New York City on July 22 (tracks 9–12), July 26 (tracks 1–3) and December 12 (tracks 4–8), 1952

== Personnel ==
- Count Basie – piano, organ
- Paul Campbell (tracks 2 & 7–12) Wendell Culley (tracks 2 & 7–12), Reunald Jones (tracks 2, 4, 5 & 7–12), Joe Newman (tracks 2 & 7–12) – trumpet
- Henry Coker (tracks 2, 4, 5 & 7–12), Benny Powell (tracks 2 & 7–12), Jimmy Wilkins (tracks 2 & 7–12) – trombone
- Marshall Royal – alto saxophone, clarinet (tracks 2, 4, 5 & 7–12)
- Ernie Wilkins – alto saxophone, tenor saxophone, arranger (tracks 2 & 7–12)
- Eddie "Lockjaw" Davis (tracks 2, 3 & 7–12), Paul Quinichette (tracks 2 & 4–12) – tenor saxophone
- Charlie Fowlkes – baritone saxophone (tracks 2, 4, 5 & 7–12)
- Oscar Peterson – piano, organ (tracks 1–3)
- Freddie Green – guitar
- Ray Brown (tracks 1–3), Jimmy Lewis (tracks 9–12), Gene Ramey (tracks 4–8) – bass
- Gus Johnson (tracks 1–3 & 7–12), Buddy Rich (tracks 4–6) – drums
- Al Hibbler – vocals (tracks 7 & 8)
- Buck Clayton, A. K. Salim – arranger
