= Reunald Jones =

American jazz musician

Reunald Jones Sr. (December 22, 1910 – February 26, 1989), was an American jazz trumpeter, who worked in big bands and as a studio musician. He played lead trumpet with the Count Basie Orchestra (1952–57).

== Career ==
A native of Indianapolis, Indiana, United States, he studied at the Michigan Conservatory and then played with territory bands such as that of Speed Webb. In the 1930s and 1940s, Jones worked with Charlie Johnson, Savoy Bearcats, Fess Williams, Chick Webb (1933–34), Sam Wooding, Claude Hopkins, Willie Bryant, Teddy Hill, Don Redman (1936–38), Erskine Hawkins, Duke Ellington (1946), Jimmie Lunceford, Lucky Millinder and Sy Oliver. He soloed sparingly after his time with Chick Webb.

From 1956 to 1958, Jones was a member of the Quincy Jones band The Jones Boys, a session conceived by Leonard Feather with musicians named "Jones", though none of them were related.

Beginning in the 1940s, Jones worked as a studio musician. He toured with Woody Herman (1959), George Shearing's big band (1960) and with an orchestra accompanying Nat King Cole (1961–64). He played less from the 1970s. His son, Reunald Jones Jr., played trumpet for Sammy Davis Jr. and James Brown, and his grandson, Renny Jones, is a bass guitarist.

Reunald Jones died in February 1989, at the age of 78.

== Discography ==
=== As leader ===
- The Jones Boys with Eddie Jones, Jimmy Jones, Jo Jones, Quincy Jones, Thad Jones (Period, 1957)

=== As sideman ===
- Dance Session (Clef, 1953)
- Basie Jazz (Clef, 1954)
- Basie (Clef, 1955)
- The Count! (Clef, 1955)
- Count Basie Swings, Joe Williams Sings (Clef, 1955)
- Dance Session Album#2 (Columbia, 1956)
- Metronome All-Stars 1956 (Clef, 1956)
- The Greatest!! Count Basie Plays, Joe Williams Sings Standards (Verve, 1956)
- April in Paris (Verve, 1957)
- Basie in London (Verve, 1957)
- Count Basie at Newport (Verve, 1957)
- One O'Clock Jump (Verve, 1957)
- Basie Rides Again! (Verve, 1957)
- Hall of Fame (Verve, 1959)
- A Portrait of an Orchestra (Verve, 1965)
- Count at the Organ (Verve, 1965)
- Inside Basie Outside (VSP, 1966)

With Sammy Davis Jr.

- At the Cocoanut Grove (Reprise, 1961)
- Recorded Live (Reprise, 1963)
- That's All! (Reprise, 1967)

With others

- Gene Ammons, Free Again (Prestige, 1972)
- Cat Anderson, Cat On a Hot Tin Horn (Mercury, 1958)
- Ella Fitzgerald & Count Basie & Joe Williams, One O'Clock Jump (Verve, 1957)
- Woody Herman, The Fourth Herd (Jazzland, 1960)
- Woody Herman, Woody Herman & the Fourth Herd (Windmill, 1972)
- Jimmie Lunceford, The Golden Swing Years (Storyville, 1968)
- Letta Mbulu, There's Music in the Air (A&M, 1977)
- Paul Quinichette, The Kid from Denver (Dawn, 1956)
- George Rhodes, Porgy and Bess (AAMCO, 1959)
- Sonny Rollins, Sonny Rollins and the Big Brass (MetroJazz, 1958)
- Sonny Stitt, Sonny Stitt & the Top Brass (Atlantic, 1962)
- Dinah Washington, Dinah Washington Sings Fats Waller (Mercury/Emarcy, 1959)
