= The Jones Boys =

1957 studio album

Studio album by Thad Jones, Reunald Jones, Quincy Jones, Jimmy Jones, Jo Jones and Eddie Jones
- Released: 1957
- Recorded: January 6, 1957
- Studio: Stereo Sound Studios, NYC
- Genre: Jazz
- Length: 43:19
- Label: Period; SPL 1210
- Producer: Leonard Feather

Thad Jones chronology
Mad Thad (1957)	The Jones Boys (1957)	Olio (1957)

The Jones Boys is an album coordinated by Leonard Feather featuring trumpeter Thad Jones, pianist Jimmy Jones, bassist Eddie Jones and drummer Jo Jones along with Reunald Jones, Quincy Jones on four tracks which was recorded in early 1957 and first released on the Period label. The album was reissued on CD on Original Jazz Classics in 1999.

== Reception ==
Professional ratings
Review scores
Source	Rating
Allmusic	3/5 stars

Allmusic's Ken Dryden noted, "The Jones Boys was a session conceived by Leonard Feather featuring a number of musicians named "Jones," though none of them are related ... a rhythm section consisting of pianist Jimmy Jones, bassist Eddie Jones, and drummer Jo Jones. Thad Jones' muted trumpet carries a swinging version of Rodgers & Hammerstein's "No Other Love," followed by a lush interpretation of "You Leave Me Breathless" and the trumpeter's tasty original "Blues for the Joneses." The somewhat obscure trumpeter Reunald Jones (best known for his section work in the bands of Count Basie, Chick Webb, and Don Redman) and Quincy Jones (heard on flügelhorn) join Thad Jones on several selections, including Quincy's fireworks-filled "The Jones Bash" and the funky blues "Jones Beach"".

== Track listing ==
1. "The Jones Bash" (Quincy Jones) − 3:22
2. "You Leave Me Breathless" (Friedrich Hollaender, Ralph Freed) − 5:42
3. "No Other Love" (Richard Rodgers, Oscar Hammerstein II) − 2:58
4. "You've Changed" (Bill Carey, Carl Fischer) − 4:31
5. "Jones Beach" (Quincy Jones) − 6:08
6. "Montego Bay" (Jane Feather) − 4:25
7. "Blues for the Joneses" (Thad Jones) − 4:59
8. "Salute to the Blue Bird" (Thad Jones) − 5:17
9. "Have You Met Miss Jones?" (Rodgers, Lorenz Hart) − 5:16

== Personnel ==
- Thad Jones − trumpet
- Reunald Jones − trumpet (tracks 1, 5, 8 & 9)
- Quincy Jones - flugelhorn (tracks 1, 5, 8 & 9)
- Jimmy Jones - piano
- Eddie Jones - bass
- Jo Jones - drums
