= Dance Session =

Studio album by Count Basie
- Released: 1954
- Recorded: August 13 and December 12, 1953
- Studio: Los Angeles, CA, and Fine Sound, New York City
- Genre: Jazz
- Length: 34:39
- Label: Clef; MG C-626
- Producer: Norman Granz

Count Basie chronology
Basie Rides Again! (1952)	Dance Session (1954)	Dance Session Album #2 (1954)

Dance Session is an album by pianist/bandleader Count Basie recorded in 1953 and became Basie's first 12-inch LP when it was originally released on the Clef label. Selections from this album were also released on the 1956 Clef LPs Basie Roars Again and King of Swing.

== Track listing ==
1. "Straight Life" (Johnny Mandel) - 4:33
2. "Basie Goes Wess" (Frank Wess) - 3:52
3. "Softly, With Feeling" (Neal Hefti) - 3:05
4. "Peace Pipe" (Ernie Wilkins) - 2:28
5. "Blues Go Away!" (Wilkins) - 3:19
6. "Cherry Point" (Hefti) - 3:19
7. "Bubbles" (Hefti) - 4:05
8. "Right On" (Freddie Green) - 2:39
9. "The Blues Done Come Back" (Wilkins) - 3:37
10. "Plymouth Rock" (Hefti) - 3:42

Recorded in Los Angeles, CA, on August 13 (tracks 5 & 10) and at Fine Sound Studios in New York City on December 12 (tracks 1–4 & 6–9), 1953

== Personnel ==
- Count Basie - piano, organ
- Paul Campbell (tracks 5 & 10), Wendell Culley, Reunald Jones, Joe Newman, Joe Wilder (tracks 1–4 & 6–9) - trumpet
- Johnny Mandel - bass trumpet, arranger (tracks 5 & 10)
- Henderson Chambers (tracks 1–4 & 6–9), Henry Coker, Benny Powell - trombone
- Marshall Royal - alto saxophone, clarinet
- Ernie Wilkins - alto saxophone, tenor saxophone, arranger
- Frank Wess - tenor saxophone, arranger
- Frank Foster - tenor saxophone
- Charlie Fowlkes - baritone saxophone
- Freddie Green - guitar, arranger
- Eddie Jones- bass
- Gus Johnson - drums
- Neal Hefti - arranger
