= On My Way & Shoutin' Again! =

Studio album by Count Basie and His Orchestra
- Released: 1962
- Recorded: November 2, 3 & 5, 1962; New York City
- Genre: Jazz
- Length: 34:13
- Label: Verve
- Producer: Jim Davis

Count Basie chronology
Sinatra–Basie: An Historic Musical First (1962)	On My Way & Shoutin' Again! (1962)	This Time by Basie! (1963)

On My Way & Shoutin' Again! is an album released by pianist, composer and bandleader Count Basie featuring compositions by Neal Hefti recorded in 1962 and originally released on the Verve label.

== Reception ==
Professional ratings
Review scores
Source	Rating
AllMusic	3/5 stars
DownBeat	4/5 stars
New Record Mirror	4/5 stars

DownBeat critic Harvey Pekar commented in his February 28, 1963, review: "generally fine solo work and several admirable Hefti scores plus Basie's inevitably strong rhythm section – all of which adds up to a very good album." AllMusic reviewer Michael G. Nastos described the album as "A solid and worthwhile album that has been out of print for far too long, this will be a welcome addition to any Basie lover's collection, and comes highly recommended to anyone even mildly interested in excellent large-ensemble mainstream jazz".

== Track listing ==
All compositions by Neal Hefti

1. "I'm Shoutin' Again" – 3:50
2. "Ducky Bumps" – 3:35
3. "The Long Night" – 3:42
4. "Jump for Johnny" – 3:16
5. "Ain't That Right" – 2:50
6. "Together Again" – 2:44
7. "Shanghaied" – 3:33
8. "Skippin' with Skitch" – 4:02
9. "Eee Dee" – 3:03
10. "Rose Bud" – 3:38

== Personnel ==
- Count Basie – piano
- Al Aarons, Sonny Cohn, Thad Jones, Fip Ricard, Ernie Royal – trumpet
- Henry Coker, Grover Mitchell, Benny Powell – trombone
- Marshal Royal – alto saxophone, clarinet
- Frank Wess – alto saxophone, tenor saxophone, flute
- Eric Dixon – tenor saxophone, flute
- Frank Foster – tenor saxophone
- Charlie Fowlkes – baritone saxophone, flute
- Freddie Green – guitar
- Buddy Catlett – bass
- Sonny Payne – drums
