= Back with Basie =

Studio album by Count Basie and His Orchestra
- Released: 1962
- Recorded: December 1960 and July 1, 13, 25 & 26, 1962; New York City
- Genre: Jazz
- Length: 40:00
- Label: Roulette
- Producer: Teddy Reig

Count Basie chronology
Easin' It (1962)	Back with Basie (1962)	Basie in Sweden (1962)

Back with Basie (subtitled More Hit Performances of the '60s) is an album released by pianist, composer and bandleader Count Basie featuring tracks recorded in 1962 (with one from 1960) and originally released on the Roulette label.

== Reception ==
Professional ratings
Review scores
Source	Rating
AllMusic	3/5 stars

AllMusic awarded the album 3 stars.

== Track listing ==
1. "Peppermint Pipes" (Frank Wess) – 3:15
2. "Thanks for the Ride" (Roy Alfred) – 3:40
3. "The Elder" (Thad Jones) – 7:00
4. "Summer Frost" (Wess) – 3:06
5. "The Touch of Your Lips" (Ray Noble) – 3:15
6. "Bluish Grey" (Jones) – 4:56
7. "One Note Samba" (Antonio Carlos Jobim, Newton Mendonça) – 4:09
8. "I Got It Bad (and That Ain't Good)" (Duke Ellington) – 3:15
9. "Matte Jersey" (Frank Foster) – 3:55
10. "Red Hot Mama" (Ernie Wilkins) – 3:29
- Recorded in New York City in December 1960 (track 10), July 1, 1962 (tracks 3, 4 & 8), July 13, 1962 (tracks 2 & 9), July 25, 1962 (track 5 & 6), and July 26, 1962 (tracks 1 & 7)

== Personnel ==
- Count Basie – piano
- Al Aarons (tracks 1–9), Sonny Cohn, Thad Jones, Joe Newman (track 10), Fip Ricard (tracks 1–9), Snooky Young (track 10) – trumpet
- Henry Coker, Al Grey (track 10), Quentin Jackson (tracks 1–9), Benny Powell – trombone
- Marshal Royal, Frank Wess – alto saxophone
- Eric Dixon (tracks 1–9), Frank Foster, Billy Mitchell (track 10) – tenor saxophone
- Charlie Fowlkes – baritone saxophone
- Freddie Green – guitar
- Art Davis (tracks 3, 4 & 8), Ike Isaacs (tracks 1, 2, 5–7 & 9), Eddie Jones (track 10) – bass
- Louis Bellson (tracks 1, 3–7 & 8), Sonny Payne (tracks 2, 9 & 10) – drums
- Irene Reid – vocals (tracks 3, 4 & 8)
