= The Greatest!! Count Basie Plays, Joe Williams Sings Standards =

Studio album by Count Basie and His Orchestra with Joe Williams
- Released: 1956
- Recorded: April 28 and May 1, 1956
- Studio: Capitol (Hollywood)
- Genre: Vocal jazz, jazz
- Length: 34:43
- Label: Verve; MGV 2016
- Producer: Norman Granz

Count Basie chronology
| April in Paris (1956) | The Greatest!! Count Basie Plays, Joe Williams Sings Standards (1956) | Metronome All-Stars 1956 (1956) |

Joe Williams chronology
| Count Basie Swings, Joe Williams Sings (1956) | The Greatest!! Count Basie Plays, Joe Williams Sings Standards (1956) | A Night at Count Basie's (1957) |

The Greatest!! Count Basie Plays, Joe Williams Sings Standards is an album by vocalist Joe Williams and pianist/bandleader Count Basie and His Orchestra recorded in 1956 and released on the Verve label. It was Williams' second album with Basie following Count Basie Swings, Joe Williams Sings.

== Reception ==
Professional ratings
Review scores
| Source | Rating |
|---|---|
| AllMusic | 3/5 stars |

AllMusic awarded the album 3 stars.

== Track listing ==
1. "Thou Swell" (Lorenz Hart, Richard Rodgers) – 2:19
2. "There Will Never Be Another You" (Mack Gordon, Harry Warren) – 2:48
3. "Love Is Here to Stay" (George Gershwin, Ira Gershwin) – 3:38
4. "'S Wonderful" (Gershwin, Gershwin) – 2:35
5. "My Baby Just Cares for Me" (Walter Donaldson, Gus Kahn) – 2:24
6. "Nevertheless (I'm in Love with You)" (Bert Kalmar, Harry Ruby) – 3:54
7. "Singin' in the Rain" (Nacio Herb Brown, Arthur Freed) – 2:25
8. "I'm Beginning to See the Light" (Duke Ellington, Don George, Johnny Hodges) – 3:04
9. "A Fine Romance" (Dorothy Fields, Jerome Kern) – 2:28
10. "Come Rain or Come Shine" (Harold Arlen, Johnny Mercer) – 3:58
11. "I Can't Believe That You're in Love with Me" (Clarence Gaskill, Jimmy McHugh) – 2:38
12. "This Can't Be Love" (Hart, Rodgers) – 2:32
- Recorded at Capitol Studios in Hollywood, CA, on April 28, 1956 (tracks 2, 3 & 6–9) and May 1, 1956 (tracks 1, 4, 5 & 10–12)

== Personnel ==
- Joe Williams – vocals
- Count Basie – piano
- Wendell Culley, Reunald Jones, Thad Jones, Joe Newman – trumpet
- Henry Coker, Bill Hughes, Benny Powell – trombone
- Marshall Royal – alto saxophone, clarinet
- Bill Graham – alto saxophone
- Frank Wess – alto saxophone, tenor saxophone, flute, clarinet
- Frank Foster – tenor saxophone, clarinet
- Charlie Fowlkes – baritone saxophone, bass clarinet
- Freddie Green – guitar
- Eddie Jones – bass
- Sonny Payne – drums
- Buddy Bregman – arranger, conductor
