= The Count! =

Studio album by Count Basie
- Released: 1955
- Recorded: January 19 and July 22 & 26, 1952; Fine Sound, New York City
- Genre: Jazz
- Label: Clef; MG C-685
- Producer: Norman Granz

Count Basie chronology
Basie 8 & 16 (1951)	The Count! (1955)	The Swinging Count! (1952)

The Count! is an album by pianist/bandleader Count Basie recorded in 1952 and released on the Clef label in 1955.

== Reception ==
Professional ratings
Review scores
Source	Rating
AllMusic	3/5 stars

AllMusic awarded the album 3 stars.

== Track listing ==
1. "New Basie Blues" (Count Basie) - 3:26
2. "Sure Thing" (Neal Hefti) - 3:03
3. "Why Not?" (Hefti) - 3:31
4. "Fawncy Meetin' You" (Hefti) - 3:03
5. "Bootsie" (Basie) - 3:22
6. "Tom Whaley" (Basie) - 2:56
7. "Paradise Squat" (Basie) - 4:05
8. "Basie Talks" (Basie) - 3:39
9. "Hob Nail Boogie" (Basie) - 2:35
10. "Jack and Jill" (Basie) - 2:55
11. "Bunny" (Basie) - 3:09
12. "Cash Box" (Basie) - 3:24
- Recorded at Fine Sound Studios in New York City on January 19 (tracks 1–4), July 22 (tracks 7–11) and July 26 (tracks 5, 6 & 12), 1952

== Personnel ==
- Count Basie - piano, organ
- Paul Campbell, Wendell Culley, Reunald Jones (tracks 5–12), Joe Newman, Charlie Shavers (tracks 1–4) - trumpet
- Henry Coker, Benny Powell, Jimmy Wilkins - trombone
- Marshall Royal - alto saxophone, clarinet
- Ernie Wilkins - alto saxophone, tenor saxophone, arranger
- Eddie "Lockjaw" Davis (tracks 5–12), Floyd Johnson (tracks 1–4), Paul Quinichette - tenor saxophone
- Charlie Fowlkes - baritone saxophone
- Freddie Green - guitar
- Jimmy Lewis - bass
- Gus Johnson - drums
- Buck Clayton (track 6), Andy Gibson, (track 11), Buster Harding (tracks 7, 9 & 12), Neal Hefti (tracks 2–4), Nat Pierce (track 1), Don Redman (track 10) - arranger
