= Basie Plays Hefti =

Studio album by Count Basie
- Released: 1958
- Recorded: April 3, 4 & 14, 1958
- Studio: Capitol (New York)
- Genre: Jazz
- Label: Roulette; SR 52011
- Producer: Teddy Reig

Count Basie chronology
Count Basie Presents Eddie Davis Trio + Joe Newman (1957)	Basie Plays Hefti (1958)	Sing Along with Basie (1958)

Basie Plays Hefti is an album released by pianist, composer and bandleader Count Basie performing the compositions and arrangements of Neal Hefti recorded in 1958 and originally released on the Roulette label. Basie, Hefti, and producer Teddy Reig had collaborated six months earlier on the album E=MC^{2}.

== Reception ==
Professional ratings
Review scores
Source	Rating
AllMusic	4/5 stars

AllMusic awarded the album 4 out of 5 stars and its review by Scott Yanow states, "The Count Basie Orchestra was in top form for this set".

== Track listing ==
All compositions by Neal Hefti

1. "Has Anyone Here Seen Basie" - 2:42
2. "Cute" - 3:10
3. "Pensive Miss" - 3:48
4. "Sloo Foot" - 3:08
5. "It's Awf'ly Nice to Be With You" - 3:31
6. "Scoot" - 2:28
7. "A Little Tempo, Please" - 2:36
8. "Late Date" - 3:17
9. "Count Down" - 2:45
10. "Bag'a Bones" - 2:42
11. "Pony Tail" - 3:59

== Personnel ==
- Count Basie - piano
- Wendell Culley, Thad Jones, Joe Newman, Snooky Young - trumpet
- Henry Coker, Al Grey, Benny Powell - trombone
- Frank Wess, Marshal Royal - alto saxophone
- Frank Foster, Billy Mitchell - tenor saxophone
- Charlie Fowlkes - baritone saxophone
- Freddie Green - guitar
- Eddie Jones - bass
- Sonny Payne - drums
- Neal Hefti - arranger
