= Li'l Darlin' =

1957 jazz standard by Neal Hefti

"Li'l Darlin'" (copyrighted in 1958 as "Lil' Darlin'") is a jazz standard, composed and arranged in 1957 by Neal Hefti for the Count Basie Orchestra and first recorded on the 1958 album The Atomic Mr. Basie (Roulette Records).

== Style ==
The composition, in the words of jazz writer Donald Clarke, is "an object lesson in how to swing at a slow tempo".

Gary Giddins expands on the importance of tempo in the performance of "Li'l Darlin'", saying that "in the enduring 'Li'l Darlin'', [Hefti] tested the band's temporal mastery with a slow and simple theme that dies if it isn't played at exactly the right tempo. Basie never flinched". Hefti envisioned the piece to be played at a medium swing tempo, not as a ballad.

== History ==
The Jazz Discography (online), as of June 24, 2019, lists 324 recordings of the work.

=== With lyrics added ===
Around 1958, Jon Hendricks wrote and arranged lyrics to "Li'l Darlin'", and his vocal trio, Lambert, Hendricks & Ross, performed it with Basie on May 26, 1958, for Roulette Records, (initially unissued, session no. 13064). Mark Murphy recorded it on Rah in 1961. In 1963, Mel Tormé sang "Li'l Darlin'" with the Basie Band on The Judy Garland Show. Hendricks & Company recorded the song on Love in 1982, and Kurt Elling on Flirting with Twilight in 2001.

Bart Howard wrote new lyrics, "Don't Dream of Anybody But Me", to Hefti's tune in 1959. Tormé recorded that version on Back in Town (1959), Bobby Darin on This Is Darin (1960), Mabel Mercer on Merely Marvelous (1960) and Ella Fitzgerald on Things Ain't What They Used to Be (1971).

=== Big band, combos, and soloists ===
"Li'l Darlin'" rapidly became a small-group and solo instrument standard. Notable guitarists to record the piece include Joe Pass, Charlie Byrd, George Benson, Tal Farlow, Barney Kessel, Kenny Burrell, Howard Alden, George Van Eps and Howard Roberts. Pass performed it live at the Montreux Jazz Festival in 1979. Martin Taylor published his arrangement of the piece in a 2000 issue of Guitar Techniques.

=== TV and videography ===
The Basie arrangement without lyrics was often used as the closing theme for The Tonight Show Starring Johnny Carson.

=== Filmography ===
1995: Mighty Aphrodite from Basie's original 1958 Atomic album
2022: Tár

== Influence ==
"Sweetie Pie" – composed and arranged by Don Sebesky and recorded March 1962 as "Easy Chair" on Maynard Ferguson's Maynard '64 (Roulette R-52107) – has been described by its publisher, Sierra Music Publications, as "Li'l Darlin'-ish", owing to its similarity as a swing ballad. (audio)

== Selected discography ==
Session / performance date	Artist(s) (leader)	Album or Single	Label (Catalog No.)	Studio (Venue)	Matrix No.
21 October 1958	Count Basie and His Orchestra (audio)	The Atomic Mr. Basie	Roulette R 4040	Capitol; New York	R52003B (Side B)
2 July 1960	Ray Charles (video)	Ray Charles Concert, Newport Jazz Festival, July 2, 1960	Wolfgang's Vault 421) (DL) (re-issued on WaxTime)	Newport Jazz Festival	
11 November 1996	The New York Allstars; Randy Sandke (trumpet); Dan Barrett (trombone); Brian Ogilvie (de) (tenor & alto sax, clarinet); Billy Mitchell (tenor sax); Mark Shane (piano); James Chirillo (guitar); Bob Haggart (bass); Joe Ascione (drums) (audio)	Swingin' the Blues: Count Basie Remembered (Vol. 2)	Nagel-Heyer (G) CD 041	Live at the Amerika Haus; Hamburg	Sonopress T-8857
