= The Atomic Mr. Basie =

1958 studio album by Count Basie

Studio album by Count Basie and his orchestra
- Released: January 1958
- Recorded: October 21–22, 1957
- Studio: Capitol (New York) (Note: Basie's session for the Atomic album was at Capitol Studios Studio A (Capitol Records, Inc.), located in the Theater District, Midtown Manhattan, on the first floor (one floor up) in the Eaves Building at 151 West 46th Street. The Eaves Costume Company occupied the ground floor. (see Capitol Studios § 151 West 46th Street, New York))
- Genre: Swing, big band
- Length: 39:30; 56:34 (1994 Reissue)
- Label: Roulette
- Producer: Teddy Reig

Count Basie and his orchestra chronology
Count Basie at Newport (1957)	The Atomic Mr. Basie (1958)	Count Basie Presents Eddie Davis Trio + Joe Newman (1957)

The Atomic Mr. Basie (originally called Basie, also known as E=MC^{2} and reissued in 1994 as The Complete Atomic Basie) is a 1958 album by Count Basie, featuring the song arrangements of Neal Hefti and the Count Basie Orchestra. It is included in the book 1001 Albums You Must Hear Before You Die, Will Fulford-Jones calling it "Basie's last great record." It was voted number 411 in the third edition of Colin Larkin's All Time Top 1000 Albums (2000).

== Recording ==
The tracks were recorded October 21–22, 1957. The tracks on the original release were all composed and arranged by Hefti. Part of the second day was used for recording tracks by Jimmy Mundy – "Silks and Satins" and "Sleepwalker's Serenade". It also featured recordings of "The Late, Late Show", which had been a hit for Dakota Staton that year, also likely arranged by Mundy. These additional tracks were released in 1994 on The Complete Atomic Basie.

== Release ==
This was the first Basie album released by Roulette Records.

== Reception ==
Professional ratings
Review scores
Source	Rating
AllMusic	5/5 stars
Disc	5/5 stars
The Encyclopedia of Popular Music	5/5 stars
The Penguin Guide to Jazz	4/4 stars

The album won Best Jazz Performance, Group and Best Performance by a Dance Band awards at the 1st Annual Grammy Awards. AllMusic gave it 5 stars, reviewer Bruce Eder saying that "it took Basie's core audience and a lot of other people by surprise, as a bold, forward-looking statement within the context of a big-band recording."

The success of the album led to Basie, Hefti and producer Teddy Reig collaborating again six months later to record Basie Plays Hefti.

== Track listing ==
All tracks composed and arranged by Neal Hefti, except where indicated.

Original Release (1958)
No.	Title	Length
1.	"The Kid from Red Bank"	2:38
2.	"Duet"	4:10
3.	"After Supper"	3:22
4.	"Flight of the Foo Birds"	3:21
5.	"Double-O"	2:45
6.	"Teddy the Toad"	3:40
7.	"Whirlybird"	3:46
8.	"Midnite Blue"	4:25
9.	"Splanky"	3:35
10.	"Fantail"	2:50
11.	"Li'l Darlin'"	4:47

The Complete Atomic Basie Bonus Tracks (1994)
No.	Title	Length
12.	"Silks and Satins" (Jimmy Mundy)	4:05
13.	"Sleepwalker's Serenade (Alternative Take)" (Mundy, Hefti)	3:37
14.	"Sleepwalker's Serenade" (Mundy, Hefti)	3:39
15.	"The Late, Late Show" (Roy Alfred, Murray Berlin)	2:52
16.	"The Late, Late Show (Vocal Version)" (Alfred, Berlin)	3:02

== Personnel ==
- Wendell Culley — trumpet
- Snooky Young — trumpet
- Thad Jones — trumpet
- Joe Newman — trumpet
- Henry Coker — trombone
- Al Grey — trombone
- Benny Powell — trombone
- Marshal Royal — reeds
- Frank Wess — reeds
- Eddie "Lockjaw" Davis — reeds
- Frank Foster — reeds
- Charles Fowlkes — reeds
- Count Basie — piano
- Eddie Jones — bass
- Freddie Green — guitar
- Sonny Payne — drums
- Joe Williams — vocals (track 16)
- Neal Hefti — arrangements (tracks 1–11)
- Jimmy Mundy — arrangements (tracks 12–14)
