= Dance Session Album No. 2 =

Dance Session Album #2

Studio album by Count Basie
- Released: 1955
- Recorded: July 26, 1952, and August 16–17, 1954
- Studio: Fine Sound, New York City
- Genre: Jazz
- Length: 34:39
- Label: Clef; MG C-647
- Producer: Norman Granz

Count Basie chronology
Dance Session (1953)	Dance Session Album #2 (1955)	Basie (1954)

Dance Session Album #2 is an album by pianist/bandleader Count Basie recorded in 1954 (with one track from 1952) and originally released on the Clef label. Selections from this album were also released on the 1956 Clef LPs Basie Roars Again and King of Swing.

== Reception ==
Professional ratings
Review scores
Source	Rating
AllMusic	3/5 stars

AllMusic awarded the album 3 stars.

== Track listing ==
1. "Stereophonic" (Ernie Wilkins) - 2:25
2. "Mambo Mist" (Pat "Chico" Barnes) - 4:07
3. "Sixteen Men Swinging" (Wilkins) - 3:03
4. "She's Just My Size" (Wilkins) - 4:32
5. "You're Not the Kind" (Count Basie) - 3:19
6. "I Feel Like a New Man" (Manny Albam) - 2:56
7. "You for Me" (Neal Hefti) - 3:12
8. "Soft Drink" (Reunald Jones) - 3:08
9. "Two for the Blues" (Hefti) - 2:50
10. "Slow But Sure" (Albam) - 3:45

Recorded at Fine Sound Studios in New York City on July 26, 1952 (track 5), August 16, 1954 (tracks 4 & 6–10), and August 17, 1954 (tracks 1–3)

Preceding to Mosaic's 2005 Compilation Reissue "Count Basie - The Complete Clef & Verve Fifties Studio Recordings", the writing credits for track 5 were mostly listed in favor of Irving Mills and Will Hudson.

== Personnel ==
- Count Basie - piano
- Paul Campbell (track 5), Wendell Culley, Reunald Jones, Thad Jones (tracks 1–4 & 6–10), Joe Newman - trumpet
- Henry Coker, Bill Hughes (tracks 1–4 & 6–10), Benny Powell, Jimmy Wilkins (track 5) - trombone
- Marshall Royal - alto saxophone, clarinet
- Ernie Wilkins - alto saxophone, tenor saxophone, arranger (tracks 1, 3, 4)
- Eddie "Lockjaw" Davis (track 5), Frank Foster (tracks 1–4 & 6–10), Paul Quinichette (track 5), Frank Wess (tracks 1–4 & 6–10) - tenor saxophone
- Charlie Fowlkes - baritone saxophone
- Freddie Green - guitar
- Eddie Jones (tracks 1–4 & 6–10), Jimmy Lewis (track 5) - bass
- Gus Johnson - drums
- Manny Albam (tracks 6, 8 & 10), Neal Hefti (tracks 7. 9), Nat Pierce (track 5) - arranger
