= Count Basie Swings, Joe Williams Sings =

Studio album by Count Basie and Joe Williams
- Released: 1955
- Recorded: May 17 and July 26, 1955
- Studios: Fine Sound, New York City
- Genre: Jazz
- Length: 39:39
- Labels: Clef; MG C-678
- Producer: Norman Granz

Count Basie chronology
Basie (1954)	Count Basie Swings, Joe Williams Sings (1955)	April in Paris (1956)

Joe Williams chronology
Joe Williams Sings Everyday (1955)	Count Basie Swings, Joe Williams Sings (1956)	The Greatest!! Count Basie Plays, Joe Williams Sings Standards (1957)

Count Basie Swings, Joe Williams Sings is an album by pianist/bandleader Count Basie and vocalist Joe Williams, recorded in 1955 and released on the Clef label.

== Reception ==
Professional ratings
Review scores
Source	Rating
AllMusic	5/5 stars
The Rolling Stone Jazz Record Guide	3/5 stars

AllMusic awarded the album 5 stars, stating, "Joe Williams' debut as the featured vocalist in Count Basie's band was one of those landmark moments that even savvy observers don't fully appreciate when it occurs, then realize years later how momentous an event they witnessed. Williams brought a different presence to the great Basie orchestra than the one Jimmy Rushing provided; he couldn't shout like Rushing, but he was more effective on romantic and sentimental material, while he was almost as spectacular on surging blues, up-tempo wailers, and stomping standards".

== Track listing ==
1. "Every Day I Have the Blues" (Peter Chapman, Mayall York) – 5:29
2. "The Come Back" (Memphis Slim) – 5:28
3. "Alright, Okay, You Win" (Sidney Wyche) – 3:05
4. "In the Evening (When the Sun Goes Down)" (Leroy Carr, Don Raye) – 3:38
5. "Roll 'Em Pete" (Pete Johnson, Big Joe Turner) – 3:12
6. "Teach Me Tonight" (Sammy Cahn, Gene DePaul) – 3:04
7. "My Baby Upsets Me" (Joe Williams) – 2:58
8. "Please Send Me Someone to Love" (Percy Mayfield) – 3:33
9. "Ev'ry Day" (Sammy Fain, Irving Kahal) – 3:48
10. "As Long as I Love You" (Bernie Moten, Henri Woode) – 3:06 Bonus track on CD reissue
11. "Stop! Don't!" (George Ronald Brown) – 2:36 Bonus track on CD reissue
12. "Too Close for Comfort" (Jerry Bock, Larry Holofcener, George David Weiss) – 2:53 Bonus track on CD reissue

Recorded at Fine Sound in New York City on May 17, 1955 (tracks 1–4), July 26, 1955 (tracks 5–9), June 27, 1956 (track 12) and at Universal Recording Corp, Chicago, on January 23, 1956 (tracks 10 & 11)

== Personnel ==
- Joe Williams – vocals
- Count Basie – piano
- Wendell Culley, Reunald Jones, Thad Jones, Joe Newman – trumpet
- Henry Coker, Bill Hughes, Benny Powell – trombone
- Marshall Royal – alto saxophone, clarinet
- Bill Graham – alto saxophone
- Frank Wess – alto saxophone, tenor saxophone, flute
- Frank Foster – tenor saxophone
- Charlie Fowlkes – baritone saxophone, bass clarinet
- Freddie Green – guitar
- Eddie Jones – bass
- Sonny Payne – drums
- Frank Foster (tracks 2–9), Ernie Wilkins (tracks 1 & 6) – arranger
