= The Saxophone Section =

Studio album by Coleman Hawkins
- Released: 1958
- Recorded: April 24, 1958
- Studio: Van Gelder Studio, Hackensack, NJ
- Genre: Jazz
- Length: 32:21
- Label: World Wide; MG 20001/MGS-200015
- Producer: Ozzie Cadena

Coleman Hawkins chronology
| The High and Mighty Hawk (1958) | The Saxophone Section (1958) | Bean Bags (1958) |

The Saxophone Section (also issued as Coleman Hawkins Meets the Sax Section), is an album by saxophonist Coleman Hawkins which was recorded in 1958 and released on the World Wide label.

== Reception ==
Professional ratings
Review scores
| Source | Rating |
|---|---|
| AllMusic | 3/5 stars |
| DownBeat | 4/5 stars |

Scott Yanow of AllMusic states, "the other saxophonists and part of the rhythm section were taken from the Count Basie Orchestra and outfitted with arrangements by Billy Ver Planck. They play a variety of little-known but swinging material; the logical charts and high-quality solos make this LP well worth acquiring".

DownBeat assigned the album 4 stars. Reviewer John McDonough wrote, "Here is one of the forgotten gems of jazz, no doubt because it was almost completely ignored even when it came out in 1958 on World Wide Records, a division of Savoy that produced early stereo discs. In it Coleman Hawkins is placed in the loving embrace of what was then the reed section of the Count Basie band. In a period when recorded jazz was mostly short order blowing sessions, this date stood out as a delightful middle ground between the lock step discipline of the full scale orchestra and the casual inconsequentiality that often was obvious on so many instant LPs on Prestige, Blue Note and Verve".

== Track listing ==
1. "There Is Nothin' Like a Dame" (Richard Rodgers, Oscar Hammerstein II) – 3:51
2. "Ooga Dooga" (Coleman Hawkins) – 5:46
3. "Thanks for the Misery" (Billy Ver Planck) – 4:19
4. "An Evening at Papa Joe's" (Frank Foster, Frank Wess) – 8:11
5. "I've Grown Accustomed to Her Face" (Frederick Loewe, Alan Jay Lerner) – 5:40
6. "Thanks for the Misery" [alternate take] (Ver Planck) – 4:34 Additional track on reissue

== Personnel ==
- Coleman Hawkins – tenor saxophone
- Marshall Royal, Frank Wess – alto saxophone
- Frank Foster – tenor saxophone
- Charlie Fowlkes – baritone saxophone
- Nat Pierce – piano
- Freddie Green – guitar
- Eddie Jones – bass
- Bobby Donaldson – drums
- Billy Ver Planck – arranger
