= Hall of Fame (Count Basie album) =

Studio album by Count Basie and His Orchestra
- Released: 1959
- Recorded: January 5 & 11 and June 26 & 27, 1956; Fine Sound, New York City
- Genre: Jazz
- Length: 45:02
- Label: Verve; MGV 8291
- Producer: Norman Granz

Count Basie chronology
Metronome All-Stars 1956 (1956)	Hall of Fame (1959)	Basie in London (1956)

Hall of Fame is an album by pianist/bandleader Count Basie and His Orchestra recorded in 1956 and first released on the Verve label in 1959.

== Reception ==
Professional ratings
Review scores
Source	Rating
AllMusic	3/5 stars

AllMusic awarded the album 3 stars.

== Track listing ==
1. "Blues Inside Out" (Ernie Wilkins) - 6:37
2. "Big Red" (Wilkins) - 3:50
3. "Trick or Treat" (Wilkins) - 4:15
4. "Lady in Lace" (Frank Foster) - 4:37
5. "Flute Juice" (Wilkins) - 3:09
6. "Lollypop" (Neal Hefti) - 3:10
7. "Slats" (Joe Newman) - 4:44
8. "Move" (Denzil Best) - 3:28
9. "Dolphin Dip" (Reunald Jones) - 3:14
10. "Stompin' and Jumpin'" (Wilkins) - 2:49
11. "Low Life" (Johnny Mandel) - 5:09
- Recorded at Fine Sound in New York City on January 5, 1956 (track 2), January 11, 1956 (tracks 1, 3-5 & 8–10), June 26, 1956 (tracks 7 & 11) and June 27, 1956 (track 6)

== Personnel ==
- Count Basie - piano
- Wendell Culley, Reunald Jones, Thad Jones, Joe Newman - trumpet
- Henry Coker, Bill Hughes, Benny Powell - trombone
- Marshall Royal - alto saxophone, clarinet
- Bill Graham - alto saxophone
- Frank Wess - alto saxophone, tenor saxophone, flute, clarinet
- Frank Foster - tenor saxophone, clarinet
- Charlie Fowlkes - baritone saxophone, bass clarinet
- Freddie Green - guitar
- Eddie Jones - bass
- Sonny Payne - drums
- Neal Hefti (track 6), Frank Foster (track 4), Johnny Mandel (track 11), Frank Wess (track 8), Ernie Wilkins (tracks 1–3, 5, 7, 9 10) - arranger
