= This Time by Basie! =

Studio album by Count Basie and His Orchestra
- Released: 1963
- Recorded: January 21–24, 1963; New York City
- Genre: Jazz
- Length: 34:13
- Label: Reprise; R/R9 6070

Count Basie chronology
On My Way & Shoutin' Again! (1962)	This Time by Basie! (1963)	More Hits of the 50's and 60's (1963)

Alternative cover

This Time by Basie (subtitled Hits of the 50's & 60's) is an album released by pianist, composer and bandleader Count Basie featuring jazz versions of contemporary hits recorded in 1963 and originally released on the Reprise label.

== Reception ==
Professional ratings
Review scores
Source	Rating
AllMusic	4/5 stars
The Penguin Guide to Jazz Recordings	3/4 stars

The album won the Best Performance by a Band for Dancing at the 6th Annual Grammy Awards. AllMusic awarded the album 4 stars noting "This Time by Basie swings, smooth and easy but taut, or hot and heavy... Quincy Jones arranged and conducted This Time by Basie, and the record was successful, returning the Count to the pop charts on the eve of the British Invasion".

== Track listing ==
1. "This Could Be the Start of Something Big" (Steve Allen) - 3:15
2. "I Left My Heart in San Francisco" (George Cory, Douglass Cross) - 2:30
3. "One Mint Julep" (Rudy Toombs) - 4:00
4. "The Swingin' Shepherd Blues" (Moe Koffman) - 3:13
5. "I Can't Stop Loving You" (Don Gibson) - 4:33
6. "Moon River" (Henry Mancini, Johnny Mercer) - 3:07
7. "Fly Me to the Moon" (Bart Howard) - 3:12
8. "What Kind of Fool Am I?" (Leslie Bricusse, Anthony Newley) - 2:49
9. "Walk, Don't Run" (Johnny Smith) - 2:37
10. "Nice 'n' Easy" (Alan Bergman, Marilyn Keith, Lew Spence) – 3:15
11. "Theme from The Apartment" (Charles Williams) - 3:15

== Personnel ==
- Count Basie - piano
- Al Aarons, Sonny Cohn, Thad Jones, Eddie Preston, Fip Ricard - trumpet
- Henry Coker, Urbie Green, Grover Mitchell, Benny Powell - trombone
- Marshal Royal - alto saxophone, clarinet
- Eric Dixon, Frank Wess - tenor saxophone, flute
- Frank Foster - tenor saxophone, clarinet
- Charlie Fowlkes - baritone saxophone, bass clarinet, flute
- Freddie Green - guitar
- Buddy Catlett - bass
- Sonny Payne - drums
- Quincy Jones - arranger, conductor

== Charts ==
Chart (1963)	Peak position
US Billboard Top Albums	19
