= Charles Fowlkes =

American saxophonist

Charles Baker Fowlkes (February 16, 1916 – February 9, 1980) was an American baritone saxophonist who was a member of the Count Basie Orchestra for over 25 years.

== Early life ==
Fowlkes was born in New York City on February 16, 1916. He studied alto and tenor saxophone, clarinet, and violin before settling on the baritone saxophone (he occasionally played flute).

== Later life and career ==
Fowlkes spent most of his early career in New York. He played with Tiny Bradshaw (1938–1944), Lionel Hampton (1944–1948), and Arnett Cobb (1948–1951).

Fowlkes joined Basie's orchestra in 1953 and remained with it until his death; the main interruptions during his time with Basie were absences due to managing the career of his wife, vocalist Wini Brown. He died in Dallas on February 9, 1980.

== Discography ==
With The Count Basie Orchestra

- The Count! (Clef, 1952 [1955])
- Basie Jazz (Clef, 1952 [1954])
- Dance Session (Clef, 1953)
- Dance Session Album #2 (Clef, 1954)
- Basie (Clef, 1954)
- Count Basie Swings, Joe Williams Sings (Clef, 1955) with Joe Williams
- April in Paris (Verve, 1956)
- The Greatest!! Count Basie Plays, Joe Williams Sings Standards with Joe Williams
- Metronome All-Stars 1956 (Clef, 1956) with Ella Fitzgerald and Joe Williams
- Hall of Fame (Verve, 1956 [1959])
- The Greatest!! Count Basie Plays, Joe Williams Sings Standards with Joe Williams (Verve, 1956)
- Basie in London (Verve, 1956)
- One O'Clock Jump (Verve, 1957) with Joe Williams and Ella Fitzgerald
- Count Basie at Newport (Verve, 1957)
- The Atomic Mr. Basie (Roulette, 1957) aka Basie and E=MC^{2}
- Basie Plays Hefti (Roulette, 1958)
- Sing Along with Basie (Roulette, 1958) - with Joe Williams and Lambert, Hendricks & Ross
- Chairman of the Board (Roulette, 1959)
- Basie One More Time (Roulette, 1959)
- Breakfast Dance and Barbecue (Roulette, 1959)
- Basie/Eckstine Incorporated (Roulette, 1959)
- Strike Up the Band (Roulette, 1959)
- In Person! with Tony Bennett (Verve, 1959)
- Everyday I Have the Blues (Roulette, 1959) - with Joe Williams
- Dance Along with Basie (Roulette, 1959)
- Not Now, I'll Tell You When (Roulette, 1960)
- The Count Basie Story (Roulette, 1960)
- Kansas City Suite (Roulette, 1960)
- Count Basie/Sarah Vaughan with Sarah Vaughan (Roulette, 1960)
- Basie at Birdland (Roulette, 1961)
- First Time! The Count Meets the Duke with Duke Ellington (Columbia, 1961)
- The Legend (Roulette, 1961)
- Easin' It (Roulette, 1962)
- Back with Basie (Roulette, 1962)
- Basie in Sweden (Roulette, 1962)
- Sinatra–Basie: An Historic Musical First (Reprise, 1962)
- On My Way & Shoutin' Again! (Verve, 1962)
- This Time by Basie! (Reprise, 1963)
- More Hits of the 50's and 60's (Verve, 1963)
- Li'l Ol' Groovemaker...Basie! (Verve, 1963)
- Ella and Basie! with Ella Fitzgerald (Verve, 1963)
- Basie Land (Verve, 1964)
- It Might as Well Be Swing with Frank Sinatra (Reprise, 1964)
- Our Shining Hour with Sammy Davis Jr. (Verve, 1965)
- Pop Goes the Basie (Reprise, 1965)
- Basie Meets Bond (United Artists, 1966)
- Live at the Sands (Before Frank) (Reprise, 1966 [1998])
- Sinatra at the Sands (Reprise, 1966) with Frank Sinatra
- Basie's Beatle Bag (Verve, 1966)
- Broadway Basie's...Way (Command, 1966)
- Hollywood...Basie's Way (Command, 1967)
- Basie's Beat (Verve, 1967)
- Basie's in the Bag (Brunswick, 1967)
- The Happiest Millionaire (Coliseum, 1967)
- Half a Sixpence (Dot, 1967)
- The Board of Directors with the Mills Brothers (Dot, 1967)
- Manufacturers of Soul (Brunswick, 1968) with Jackie Wilson
- The Board of Directors Annual Report (Dot, 1968) with The Mills Brothers
- Basie Straight Ahead (Dot, 1968)
- How About This (Paramount, 1968) with Kay Starr
- Standing Ovation (Dot, 1969)
- Basic Basie (MPS, 1969)
- Basie on the Beatles (Happy Tiger, 1969)
- Basie Big Band (Pablo, 1975)
- I Told You So (Pablo, 1976)
- Live in Japan '78 (Pablo, 1978)
- Digital III at Montreux with Ella Fitzgerald (Pablo, 1979)
- A Classy Pair with Ella Fitzgerald (Pablo, 1979)

With Kenny Clarke

- Telefunken Blues (Savoy, 1955)

With Buck Clayton

- The Huckle-Buck and Robbins' Nest (Columbia, 1954)
- How Hi the Fi (Columbia, 1954)
- Jumpin' at the Woodside (Columbia, 1955)
- All the Cats Join In (Columbia 1956)

With Stanley Cowell

- Regeneration (Strata East, 1976)

With Al Grey

- The Last of the Big Plungers (Argo, 1959)
- The Thinking Man’s Trombone (Argo, 1960)

With Coleman Hawkins

- The Saxophone Section (World Wide, 1958)

With Milt Jackson

- Meet Milt Jackson (Savoy, 1955)

With Yusef Lateef

- Part of the Search (Atlantic, 1973)

With Billy Taylor

- My Fair Lady Loves Jazz (Impulse!, 1957)

With Eddie "Cleanhead" Vinson

- Clean Head's Back in Town (Bethlehem, 1957)

With Frank Wess

- Opus de Blues (Savoy, 1959 [1984])
