= April in Paris (album) =

Studio album by Count Basie and His Orchestra
- Released: 1957
- Recorded: July 26, 1955 and January 4 & 5, 1956; Fine Sound, New York City
- Genre: Jazz
- Length: 73:45 CD reissue with bonus tracks
- Label: Verve; MGV 8012
- Producer: Norman Granz

Count Basie chronology
Count Basie Swings, Joe Williams Sings (1955)	April in Paris (1957)	The Greatest!! Count Basie Plays, Joe Williams Sings Standards (1956)

April in Paris is an album by pianist/bandleader Count Basie and His Orchestra, his first released on the Verve label, recorded in 1955 and 1956.

== Reception ==
Professional ratings
Review scores
Source	Rating
AllMusic	5/5 stars
The Rolling Stone Jazz Record Guide	4/5 stars
Penguin Guide to Jazz	3/4 stars
Encyclopedia of Popular Music	5/5 stars

AllMusic awarded the album 5 stars calling it "one of those rare albums that makes its mark as an almost instant classic in the jazz pantheon" and noting "April in Paris proved Count Basie's ability to grow through modern jazz changes while keeping the traditional jazz orchestra vital and alive". The Rolling Stone Jazz Record Guide said it was "a commercial high point for this outfit". The Penguin Guide to Jazz awarded the album 3 stars stating "April in Paris is typical Basie fare of the period: bustling charts, leathery solos and pinpoint timing".

== Track listing ==
=== Original 1957 release ===
1. "April in Paris" (Vernon Duke, E.Y. "Yip" Harburg) – 3:47
2. "Corner Pocket" (Freddie Green) – 5:15
3. "Didn't You?" (Frank Foster) – 4:43
4. "Sweetie Cakes" (Ernest Brooks "Ernie" Wilkins) – 3:58
5. "Magic" (Frank Wess) – 3:06
6. "Shiny Stockings" (Frank Foster) – 5:14
7. "What Am I Here For" (Duke Ellington, Frankie Laine) – 3:19
8. "Midgets" (Joe Newman) – 3:13
9. "Mambo Inn" (Mario Bauzá, Edgar Melvin Sampson, Bobby Woodlen) – 3:23
10. "Dinner with Friends" (Neal Hefti) – 3:05

=== Bonus tracks on 1997 CD reissue ===
11. "April In Paris" [2nd Take] (Duke, Harburg) – 3:45
12. "Corner Pocket" [2nd Take] (Green) – 4:59
13. "Didn't You?" [3rd Take] (Foster) – 4:50
14. "Magic" [1st Take] (Wess) – 3:42
15. "Magic" [2nd Take] (Wess) – 3:50
16. "What Am I Here For?" [1st Take] (Ellington) – 4:06
17. "Midgets" [4th Take] (Newman) – 3:11
- Recorded at Fine Sound in New York City on July 26, 1955 (tracks 1–4 and 11–13), January 4, 1956 (track 5–8 and 14–17) and January 5, 1956 (tracks 9 and 10)

== Personnel ==
- Count Basie – piano
- Wendell Culley (tracks 1–7 & 9–16), Reunald Jones (tracks 1–7 & 9–16), Thad Jones (tracks 1–7 & 9–16), Joe Newman – trumpet
- Henry Coker, Bill Hughes, Benny Powell – trombone (tracks 1–7 & 9–16)
- Marshall Royal – alto saxophone, clarinet (tracks 1–7 & 9–16)
- Bill Graham – alto saxophone (tracks 1–7 & 9–16)
- Frank Wess – alto saxophone, tenor saxophone, flute, clarinet
- Frank Foster – tenor saxophone, clarinet (tracks 1–7 & 9–16)
- Charlie Fowlkes – baritone saxophone, bass clarinet (tracks 1–7 & 9–16)
- Freddie Green – guitar
- Eddie Jones – bass
- Sonny Payne – drums
- José Mangual Sr., Ubaldo Nieto – percussion (track 9)
- William "Wild Bill" Davis (tracks 1 & 11), Neal Hefti (track 10), Frank Foster (tracks 3, 6, 7, 9, 13 & 16), Joe Newman (tracks 8 & 17), Ernie Wilkins (track 2, 4, 12) – arranger
