= Wendell Culley =

American jazz musician

Wendell Philips Culley (January 8, 1906 in Worcester, Massachusetts – May 8, 1983 in Los Angeles, CA) was an American jazz trumpeter and occasional multi instrumentalist.

Growing up in Worcester, Culley played regularly at the AME Zion Church, in the Commerce High School band, and occasionally with Mamie Moffitt and Her Five Jazz Hounds. He also played in Boots Ward's Nite Hawks, and in working groups with his brother Ray, a drummer and singer. His older sister is actress, Zara Cully, best known for her role as Olivia 'Mother Jefferson' Jefferson on the CBS sitcom The Jeffersons. His sister Agnes Cully Brown was a fashion designer for opera singer Marian Anderson.

In 1931, he moved to New York City, where he found early work playing with Horace Henderson and Cab Calloway. He then spent 11 years in the employ of Noble Sissle, recording with him extensively. Following this, he played French horn with Harry James and His Orchestra on a 1942 recording, then tenor saxophone on a 1943-1951 Dinah Washington recording, Lionel Hampton (1944–49) and then worked again briefly with Sissle before playing in the Count Basie Orchestra from 1951 to 1959. In the late 1950s and early 1960s, he doubled on trombone with a Billy Eckstine recording.

After working with Basie, Culley retired from music and pursued a career in insurance.

== Discography ==
With Count Basie

- The Count! (Clef, 1952 [1955])
- Basie Jazz (Clef, 1952 [1954])
- Dance Session (Clef, 1953)
- Dance Session Album#2 (Clef, 1954)
- Basie (Clef, 1954)
- Count Basie Swings, Joe Williams Sings (Clef, 1955) with Joe Williams
- April in Paris (Verve, 1956)
- The Greatest!! Count Basie Plays, Joe Williams Sings Standards with Joe Williams
- Metronome All-Stars 1956 (Clef, 1956) with Ella Fitzgerald and Joe Williams
- Hall of Fame (Verve, 1956 [1959])
- Basie in London (Verve, 1956)
- One O'Clock Jump (Verve, 1957) with Joe Williams and Ella Fitzgerald
- Count Basie at Newport (Verve, 1957)
- The Atomic Mr. Basie (Roulette, 1957) a.k.a. Basie and E=MC^{2}
- Basie Plays Hefti (Roulette, 1958)
- Sing Along with Basie (Roulette, 1958) with Joe Williams and Lambert, Hendricks & Ross
- Basie One More Time (Roulette, 1959)
- Breakfast Dance and Barbecue (Roulette, 1959)
- Everyday I Have the Blues (Roulette, 1959) with Joe Williams
- The Count Basie Story (Roulette, 1960)
