= Buster Harding =

Canadian-born American jazz musician

- Born: Lavere Harding; March 19, 1912; Ontario, Canada
- Died: November 14, 1965 (aged 53) New York City, New York, United States
- Genres: Swing music
- Occupations: Musician, composer, arranger
- Instrument: Piano
- Formerly of: Count Basie

Lavere "Buster" Harding (March 19, 1917 – November 14, 1965) was a Canadian-born American jazz pianist, composer and arranger.

== Early life ==
Born to Benjamin "Ben" and Ada (née Shreve) Harding in North Buxton, Ontario, Harding was raised in Cleveland, Ohio, where as a teenager he started on his own band.

== Later life and career ==
In 1939, Harding went to work for the Teddy Wilson big band, and then in the early 1940s went to work for the Coleman Hawkins band, and later Cab Calloway. He became a freelance arranger and worked with Benny Goodman, Artie Shaw, Roy Eldridge, Dizzy Gillespie, and Count Basie, among others.

In 1949, he was the musical director for Billie Holiday recording sessions. In the early 1960s, Harding played with Jonah Jones, though he was known primarily as an arranger and composer. Harding did not record as a leader. He died on November 14, 1965, in New York City.

== Select discography ==
With Count Basie

- The Count! (Clef, 1952 [1955]) - as arranger
- Basie (Clef, 1954) - as arranger
- The Story of Jazz (Philips Records)
- Basie Ball (Philips Records)
- Sounds of Jazz (Fontana Records)
- One O'Clock Jump (Columbia Records)

With Roy Eldridge

- All the Cats Join In (MCA Records)

With Dizzy Gillespie

- The Big Band Sound of Dizzy Gillespie (Verve Records)
- Dizzy Gillespie: Best of Small Groups (Verve Records)
- Dizzy and Strings (Norgan Records, 1954) also released as Diz Big Band (Verve Records) - as arranger
- Jazz Spectrum Vol. 11: Dizzy Gillespie (Metro Records)

With Billie Holiday

- Broadcast Performances, Vol. 1: Radio And TV Broadcasts (1949-52) (ESP Disk)
- Broadcast Performances, Vol. 2: Radio And TV Broadcasts (1953-56) (ESP Disk)
