= Buddy Catlett =

American jazz musician (1933–2014)

- Born: George James Catlett; May 13, 1933; Long Beach, California, U.S.
- Died: November 12, 2014 (aged 81) Seattle, Washington, U.S.
- Genres: Jazz
- Instruments: Double bass

George James Catlett (May 13, 1933 – November 12, 2014), known professionally as Buddy Catlett, was an American jazz multi-instrumentalist, best known for his work as a bassist.

== Early life ==
Catlett was born in Long Beach, California, and raised in Seattle. A childhood friend of Quincy Jones, he played with Jones in bands led by Charlie Taylor and Bumps Blackwell. He attended Garfield High School.

== Career ==
In 1959, he was hired by Cal Tjader. He joined Jones's band for a European tour. He worked with Louis Armstrong, Bill Coleman, Curtis Fuller, Freddie Hubbard, Coleman Hawkins, Junior Mance, Chico Hamilton, Johnny Griffin and Eddie Lockjaw Davis.

== Personal life ==
He died of heart problems and other illnesses on November 12, 2014, at age 81. He had been living at the Leon Sullivan Health Care Center in the Central District of Seattle.

== Discography ==
As sideman

- 1959: The Great Wide World of Quincy Jones - Quincy Jones
- 1960: From Boogie to Funk – Bill Coleman
- 1960: Big Brass - Benny Bailey
- 1960: Boss of the Soul-Stream Trombone - Curtis Fuller
- 1960: I Dig Dancers - Quincy Jones
- 1961: The Magnificent Trombone of Curtis Fuller - Curtis Fuller
- 1961: Rights of Swing - Phil Woods
- 1962: Goin' to the Meeting – Eddie "Lockjaw" Davis
- 1962: Tough Tenor Favorites - Eddie "Lockjaw" Davis
- 1962: On My Way & Shoutin' Again! - Count Basie
- 1963: This Time by Basie! - Count Basie
- 1963: More Hits of the 50's and 60's - Count Basie
- 1963: Ella and Basie! – Ella Fitzgerald and Count Basie
- 1964: Basie Land - Count Basie
- 1964: It Might As Well Be Swing - Frank Sinatra and Count Basie
- 1966: Wrapped Tight – Coleman Hawkins
