= Bill Graham (musician) =

American jazz saxophonist (1918–1975)

- Born: William Henry Graham; September 8, 1918; Kansas City, Missouri, U.S.
- Died: December 29, 1975 (aged 57) New York, U.S.
- Genres: Jazz
- Occupation: Saxophonist
- Years active: 1940s–1960s
- Formerly of: Dizzy Gillespie; Art Blakey; Count Basie

William Henry Graham (September 8, 1918 – December 29, 1975) was an American jazz saxophonist.

== Biography ==
Graham was born in Kansas City, Missouri in September 1918 and grew up in Denver, Colorado, where he led his own ensemble which included Paul Quinichette among its members. He studied at Tuskegee University and then Lincoln University of Missouri after a stint in the Army during World War II. He worked with Count Basie, Lucky Millinder, Herbie Fields, and Erskine Hawkins early in his career. From 1946 to 1953, he worked with Dizzy Gillespie as a baritone saxophonist; among his compositions for Gillespie was the tune "Oh-Sho-Be-Do-Be".

Following his employment with Gillespie he led his own band in New York City, in addition to touring Europe with Sarah Vaughan in 1953. From 1955 to 1957, he was back with Basie, including on the 1956 release April in Paris and the Newport Jazz Festival. He also found work with Duke Ellington (1958) and Mercer Ellington (1958–59), and again with Quinichette in 1956–57.

Outside of jazz, Graham also played on numerous R&B recordings, including on those of Wynonie Harris, Joe Williams, and Little Willie John. In the 1960s he quit active touring and became a teacher in the New York City Public Schools system. He died in New York in December 1975 at the age of 57.

== Discography ==
With Count Basie

- Count Basie Swings, Joe Williams Sings (Clef, 1955)
- Count Basie and His Band That Swings the Blues (American Recording Society, 1956)
- The Band of Distinction (Clef, 1956)
- April in Paris (Verve, 1957)
- Basie in London (Verve, 1957)
- One O'Clock Jump (Verve, 1957)
- Count Basie at Newport (Verve, 1957)
- Hall of Fame (Verve, 1959)
- Inside Basie Outside (VSP 1966)

With Dizzy Gillespie

- The Champ (Savoy, 1956)
- Dizzy at Home and Abroad (Atlantic, 1957)
- School Days (Regent, 1957)
- Diz 'n' Bird in Concert (Roost, 1959)
- Dee Gee Days: The Savoy Sessions (Savoy, 1976)

With others

- Art Blakey, Art Blakey Big Band (Bethlehem, 1957)
- Art Blakey, Ain't Life Grand (Parlophone, 1959)
- Duke Ellington, Black, Brown and Beige (Columbia, 1958)
- Eddie Jefferson, The Jazz Singer (Inner City, 1976)
- Eddie Jefferson, Joe Carroll, Annie Ross, The Bebop Singers (Prestige, 1970)
- Little Willie John, Fever (Regency, 1956)
- Paul Quinichette, The Kid from Denver (Dawn, 1956)
- Eddie Vinson, Clean Head's Back in Town (Bethlehem, 1957)
