= One O'Clock Jump =

1937 jazz standard by Count Basie

Single by Count Basie
- B-side: "John's Idea"
- Released: 1937
- Recorded: July 7, 1937, New York, NY
- Genre: Jazz
- Length: 3:02
- Label: Decca; 1363
- Songwriter: Count Basie

"One O'Clock Jump" is a jazz standard; a 12-bar blues instrumental, written by Count Basie in 1937.

A lively version of it was an early part of the concert bill of Benny Goodman's famous 1938 concert at Carnegie Hall. Over time it became part of the repertoire of virtually all top swing bands and their fans and jitterbuggers.

== Background ==
The melody derived from band members' riffs—Basie rarely wrote down musical ideas, so Eddie Durham and Buster Smith helped him crystallize his ideas. The original 1937 recording of the tune by Basie and his band is noted for the saxophone work of Herschel Evans and Lester Young, trumpet by Buck Clayton, Walter Page on bass, and Basie himself on piano. The song is typical of Basie's early riff style. The song was called "One O'Clock Jump" because the band first played it near the end of a radio broadcast from the Reno Club at close to 1 AM. The instrumentation is based on "head arrangements" where each section makes up their part based on what the other sections are playing. Individuals take turns improvising over the top of the entire sound. Basie recorded "One O'Clock Jump" several times after the original performance for Decca in June 1937. Notable live radio transcriptions of the song also exist, such as Basie's November 3, 1937 performance of the song at the Meadowbrook (Cedar Grove NJ). Later, Basie recorded the song for Columbia in 1942 and 1950 and on a number of occasions in the fifties. "One O'Clock Jump" became the theme song of the Count Basie Orchestra. They used it to close each of their concerts for the next half century. It was reportedly titled "Blue Ball" at first but a radio announcer feared that title was too risqué.

== Accolades ==
In 1979, the song was inducted into the Grammy Hall of Fame. Later, it was listed in the Songs of the Century.

== Other versions ==
- "Two O'Clock Jump" was a performance by Harry James and his big band in 1939, slightly based on "One O'Clock Jump" but using triplets. Several versions of the original by Harry James and Benny Goodman feature the "Two O'Clock Jump" ending. Lionel Hampton used the song as his theme song for a while as well. Basie later released "Jumpin' at the Woodside" in a similar style.
- Al Hirt released a version on his 1961 album He's the King and His Band.
- It was the last number ever recorded by Earl Hines, in 1981 after a 58-year recording career.
- Rush drummer Neil Peart included "One O'Clock Jump" in his drum solos on the band's concert tours in 2002 and 2004.

== Appearance in film, videogames and television ==
- Reveille with Beverly (1943)
- Bon Voyage, Charlie Brown (and Don't Come Back!!) (1980)
- Harlem Nights (1989)
- The Tuskegee Airmen (1995)
- The Grass Harp (1995)
- The English Patient (1996)
- Enigma (2001)
- L.A. Noire (2011)
- The Gong Show

== See also ==
- List of 1930s jazz standards
