= Eddie Jones (jazz musician) =

American jazz bassist (1929–1997)

Eddie Jones (March 1, 1929, Greenwood, Mississippi – May 31, 1997, West Hartford, Connecticut) was an American jazz double bassist.

Jones grew up in Red Bank, New Jersey, and played early in the 1950s with Sarah Vaughan and Lester Young. He graduated from Red Bank High School in 1946 and graduated in 1951 from Howard University, where he majored in music.

Jones taught music in South Carolina from 1951 to 1952, and became a member of Count Basie's orchestra in 1953, remaining there until 1962. He recorded frequently with this ensemble, and also played with Basie in smaller ensembles; these featured both Basie sidemen (Joe Newman, Frank Foster, Frank Wess, Thad Jones, Ernie Wilkins) and others (Milt Jackson, Coleman Hawkins, Putte Wickman). Jones quit music in 1962 and took a job with IBM; he later became vice president of an insurance company. In the 1980s he returned to jazz and played on and off in swing jazz ensembles.

== Discography ==
With Dorothy Ashby

- The Jazz Harpist (Regent, 1957)

With Count Basie

- Dance Session (Clef, 1953)
- Dance Session Album #2 (Clef, 1954)
- Basie (Clef, 1954)
- Count Basie Swings, Joe Williams Sings (Clef, 1955) with Joe Williams
- April in Paris (Verve, 1956)
- The Greatest!! Count Basie Plays, Joe Williams Sings Standards with Joe Williams
- Metronome All-Stars 1956 (Clef, 1956) with Ella Fitzgerald and Joe Williams
- Hall of Fame (Verve, 1956 [1959])
- Basie in London (Verve, 1956)
- One O'Clock Jump (Verve, 1957) with Joe Williams and Ella Fitzgerald
- Count Basie at Newport (Verve, 1957)
- The Atomic Mr. Basie (Roulette, 1957) a.k.a. Basie and E=MC^{2}
- Basie Plays Hefti (Roulette, 1958)
- Sing Along with Basie (Roulette, 1958) with Joe Williams and Lambert, Hendricks & Ross
- Basie One More Time (Roulette, 1959)
- Everyday I Have the Blues (Roulette, 1959) with Joe Williams
- Dance Along with Basie (Roulette, 1959)
- Not Now, I'll Tell You When (Roulette, 1960)
- The Count Basie Story (Roulette, 1960)
- Kansas City Suite (Roulette, 1960)
- The Legend (Roulette, 1961)
- Back with Basie (Roulette, 1962)

With Bob Brookmeyer

- Jazz Is a Kick (Mercury, 1960)

With Kenny Clarke

- Telefunken Blues (Savoy, 1955)

With Jimmy Cleveland

- Cleveland Style (EmArcy, 1958)

With Frank Foster

- No 'Count (Savoy, 1956)

With Al Grey

- The Last of the Big Plungers (Argo, 1959)
- The Thinking Man’s Trombone (Argo, 1960)

With Coleman Hawkins

- The Saxophone Section (World Wide, 1958)

With Milt Jackson

- Meet Milt Jackson (Savoy, 1955)
- Opus de Jazz (Savoy, 1955)
- Bean Bags with Coleman Hawkins (Atlantic, 1958)

With Hank Jones

- Quartet-Quintet (Savoy, 1955)
- Bluebird (Savoy, 1955)

With Thad Jones

- The Jones Boys (Period, 1957) with Jimmy Jones, Quincy Jones and Jo Jones

With The Jones Brothers: Thad Jones, Hank Jones, Elvin Jones

- Keepin' Up with the Joneses (MetroJazz, 1958)

With Joe Newman

- The Count's Men (Jazztone, 1955)
- I'm Still Swinging (RCA Victor, 1955)
- Salute to Satch (RCA Victor, 1956)
- I Feel Like a Newman (Storyville, 1956)
- The Midgets (Vik, 1956)
- The Happy Cats (Coral, 1957)
- Soft Swingin' Jazz (Coral, 1958) with Shirley Scott
- Joe Newman with Woodwinds (Roulette, 1958)
- Counting Five in Sweden (Metronome, 1958)
- Jive at Five (Swingville, 1960)
- Good 'n' Groovy (Swingville, 1961)

With Paul Quinichette

- Basie Reunion (Prestige, 1958)

With Zoot Sims

- Stretching Out (United Artists, 1959)

With Buddy Tate

- Unbroken (MPS, 1970)

With Eddie "Cleanhead" Vinson

- Clean Head's Back in Town (Bethlehem, 1957)

With Frank Wess

- North, South, East....Wess (Savoy 1956)
- Opus in Swing (Savoy, 1956)
- Opus de Blues (Savoy, 1959 [1984])
- The Frank Wess Quartet (Prestige, 1960)

With Ernie Wilkins

- Flutes & Reeds (Savoy, 1955) with Frank Wess

With Lem Winchester

- Another Opus (New Jazz, 1960)
