= Sonny Payne =

American jazz drummer (1926–1979)

- Born: Percival Payne; May 4, 1926; New York City, New York, U.S.
- Died: January 29, 1979 (aged 52) Los Angeles, California
- Genres: Jazz
- Occupation: Musician
- Instrument: Drums

Sonny Payne (May 4, 1926 – January 29, 1979) was an American jazz drummer, best known for his work with Count Basie and Harry James.

== Biography ==
Payne's father was Wild Bill Davis's drummer Chris Columbus. After early study with Vic Berton, in 1944 Payne started playing professionally around New York with the Dud and Paul Bascomb band, Hot Lips Page, Earl Bostic (1945–1947), Tiny Grimes (between 1947 and 1950), and Lucille Dixon (1948).

From 1950 to 1953, Payne played with Erskine Hawkins' big band, and led his own band for two years, but in late December 1954, he made his most significant move, joining Count Basie's big band for ten years of constant touring and recording. He was originally asked only to temporarily fill in for Basie's ailing regular drummer, but Payne's skillful playing was such a hit with audiences and the band that he was immediately hired to be Basie's permanent drummer.

From Count Basie's autobiography: "Sonny Payne came in there, and right away he touched off a new spark in that band, and we had to keep him . . . but I wouldn't say that showmanship was what made the difference. It was not that easy. You can't see any stick twirling and trickerlating on those next records, but you can hear and feel a difference in the band."

He left Basie in late December 1964, leading his own trio and also touring with Illinois Jacquet in 1976. He was Frank Sinatra's personal drummer for all of the singer's live appearances with Count Basie and his big band in 1964 and 1965 and 1966; in fact, whenever Sinatra sang with Basie in the 1960s, Payne was the drummer. He rejoined Basie as the regular drummer (for almost 8 months in 1965 and 1966) and later at his wife's urging (1972-1974). Most of the rest of his career, however, was spent in the Harry James big band, which he joined in December 1966. He was overseas in Brazil with the Harry James band in December 1978. Upon his return to the US in early January 1979, he contracted the flu and died of pneumonia at the age of 52. When he was dying in the hospital, Harry James paid all of his medical bills and subsequent funeral costs.

Harold Jones, Count Basie's regular drummer from 1967 until 1972, told an interviewer, "I am proud to say that I took everything that I could from Sonny Payne." Butch Miles, Basie's regular drummer for a total of 15 years starting in 1975, told an interviewer, "I took a lot of my cues and a lot of my drumming style from Sonny Payne. When I first joined the band I knew, I knew everything that he had played, so we'd get to a certain point, I'd just play what Sonny had played and it worked." Miles also said, "I memorized all of Sonny Payne's licks. I tried 'em, and they worked." In the early 1990s after Count Basie's death, leader Frank Foster was auditioning a young drummer for the Basie band. Foster asked the drummer to come back for another audition in six months after the young man had listened to every recording he could find of Sonny Payne drumming with Count Basie.

== Discography ==
With Count Basie

- Count Basie Swings, Joe Williams Sings (Verve, 1956)
- April in Paris (Verve, 1956)
- The Greatest!! Count Basie Plays, Joe Williams Sings Standards with Joe Williams
- Metronome All-Stars 1956 (Clef, 1956) with Ella Fitzgerald and Joe Williams
- Hall of Fame (Verve, 1956 [1959])
- Basie in London (Verve, 1956)
- One O'Clock Jump (Verve, 1957) with Joe Williams and Ella Fitzgerald
- Count Basie at Newport (Verve, 1957)
- The Atomic Mr. Basie (Roulette, 1957) a.k.a. Basie and E=MC^{2}
- Basie Plays Hefti (Roulette, 1958)
- Sing Along with Basie (Roulette, 1958) - with Joe Williams and Lambert, Hendricks & Ross
- Basie One More Time (Roulette, 1959)
- Basie/Eckstine Incorporated is a 1959 studio album featuring Billy Eckstine and the Count Basie Orchestra. It was released by Roulette Records, and marked Eckstine and Basie's only recorded collaboration.
- Breakfast Dance and Barbecue (Roulette, 1959)
- Everyday I Have the Blues (Roulette, 1959) - with Joe Williams
- Dance Along with Basie (Roulette, 1959)
- Not Now, I'll Tell You When (Roulette, 1960)
- The Count Basie Story (Roulette, 1960)
- Kansas City Suite (Roulette, 1960)
- The Legend (Roulette, 1961)
- Count Basie/Sarah Vaughan (Roulette, 1961)
- Back with Basie (Roulette, 1962)
- Sinatra–Basie: An Historic Musical First (Reprise, 1962)
- On My Way & Shoutin' Again! (Verve, 1962)
- This Time by Basie! (Reprise, 1963)
- More Hits of the 50's and 60's (Verve, 1963)
- It Might As Well Be Swing (Reprise, 1964) with Frank Sinatra
- Pop Goes the Basie (Reprise, 1965)
- Basie Meets Bond (United Artists, 1966)
- Live at the Sands (Before Frank) (Reprise, 1966 [1998])
- Sinatra at the Sands (Reprise, 1966) with Frank Sinatra
- Basie's Beatle Bag (Verve, 1966)

With Al Grey

- The Last of the Big Plungers (Argo, 1959)
- The Thinking Man's Trombone (Argo, 1960)
- Shades of Grey (Tangerine, 1965)

With Joe Newman

- Counting Five in Sweden (Metronome, 1958)
