= Marshal Royal =

American jazz saxophonist and clarinetist

- Born: Marshal Walton Royal Jr. December 5, 1912; Sapulpa, Oklahoma, U.S.
- Died: May 8, 1995 (aged 82) Culver City, California, U.S.
- Genres: Jazz
- Occupation: Musician
- Instruments: Clarinet, saxophone

Marshal Walton Royal Jr. (December 5, 1912 – May 8, 1995) was an American jazz alto saxophonist and clarinetist best known for his work with Count Basie, with whose band he played for nearly 20 years.

== Early life and education ==
Marshal Royal Jr. was born into a musical family in Sapulpa, Oklahoma.

== Career ==
Royal's first professional gig was with Lawrence Brown's band at Danceland in Los Angeles, and he soon had a regular gig at the Apex, working for Curtis Mosby in Mosby's Blue Blowers, a 10-piece band. He then began an eight-year (1931–1939) stint with the Les Hite orchestra, at Sebastian's Cotton Club which was near the MGM studios in Los Angeles. He spent 1940 to 1942 with Lionel Hampton, until the war interrupted his career.

With his brother, Ernie, he served in the U.S. Navy in the 45-piece regimental band,- that was attached to the Navy's preflight training school for pilots at St. Mary's College in Moraga, California. The band played for bond rallies, regimental reviews, at football games, and in concerts for the cadets and the community. Two swing bands were organized from the larger regimental band, and they played for smokers and dances at USOs and officers clubs. Royal was leader of the Bombardiers, one of those bands, which also included his brother, Ernie, Jackie Kelson (later known as Jackie Kelso), Buddy Collette, Jerome Richardson, and Vernon Alley.

After his military service, Royal played with Eddie Heywood, then went on to work in studios in Los Angeles, California. In 1951 Royal replaced Buddy DeFranco as clarinettist with Count Basie's septet, which Basie had formed after circumstances forced him to dissolve his big band. When the Basie band was reformed the following year, Royal stayed on as lead alto saxophonist and music director and remained in place for almost 20 years.

When he left Basie in 1970, Royal settled permanently in Los Angeles, continuing to play and record, working with Bill Berry's big band, Frank Capp and Nat Pierce, Earl Hines, and Duke Ellington. Royal recorded as a soloist with Dave Frishberg in 1977, and with Warren Vache in 1978. He co-led a band with Snooky Young in the 1970s and 1980s, recording with it in 1978.

Marshal died in Culver City, California on May 8, 1995, aged 82.

== Discography ==
- 1960: Gordon Jenkins Presents (Everest)
- 1978: First Chair (Concord Jazz)
- 1978: Snooky and Marshal's Album with Snooky Young
- 1980: Royal Blue (Concord Jazz)

=== As sideman ===
With Count Basie

- The Count! (Clef, 1952 [1955])
- Basie Jazz (Clef, 1952 [1954])
- Dance Session (Clef, 1953)
- Dance Session Album #2 (Clef, 1954)
- Basie (Clef, 1954)
- Count Basie Swings, Joe Williams Sings (Clef, 1955) with Joe Williams
- April in Paris (Verve, 1956)
- The Greatest!! Count Basie Plays, Joe Williams Sings Standards with Joe Williams
- Metronome All-Stars 1956 (Clef, 1956) with Ella Fitzgerald and Joe Williams
- Hall of Fame (Verve, 1956 [1959])
- Basie in London (Verve, 1956)
- One O'Clock Jump (Verve, 1957) with Joe Williams and Ella Fitzgerald
- Count Basie at Newport (Verve, 1957)
- The Atomic Mr. Basie (Roulette, 1957) aka Basie and E=MC^{2}
- Basie Plays Hefti (Roulette, 1958)
- Sing Along with Basie (Roulette, 1958) - with Joe Williams and Lambert, Hendricks & Ross
- Basie One More Time (Roulette, 1959)
- Breakfast Dance and Barbecue (Roulette, 1959)
- Everyday I Have the Blues (Roulette, 1959) - with Joe Williams
- Dance Along with Basie (Roulette, 1959)
- Not Now, I'll Tell You When (Roulette, 1960)
- The Count Basie Story (Roulette, 1960)
- Kansas City Suite (Roulette, 1960)
- Back with Basie (Roulette, 1962)
- Basie in Sweden (Roulette, 1962)
- On My Way & Shoutin' Again! (Verve, 1962)
- Sinatra - Basie (Reprise Records FS 1008 ,1963)
- This Time by Basie! (Reprise, 1963)
- More Hits of the 50's and 60's (Verve, 1963)
- Pop Goes the Basie (Reprise, 1965)
- Basie Meets Bond (United Artists, 1966)
- Live at the Sands (Before Frank) (Reprise, 1966 [1998])
- Sinatra at the Sands (Reprise, 1966) with Frank Sinatra
- Basie's Beatle Bag (Verve, 1966)
- Broadway Basie's...Way (Command, 1966)
- Hollywood...Basie's Way (Command, 1967)
- Basie's Beat (Verve, 1967)
- Basie's in the Bag (Brunswick, 1967)
- The Happiest Millionaire (Coliseum, 1967)
- Half a Sixpence (Dot, 1967)
- The Board of Directors (Dot, 1967) with The Mills Brothers
- Manufacturers of Soul (Brunswick, 1968) with Jackie Wilson
- The Board of Directors Annual Report (Dot, 1968) with The Mills Brothers
- Basie Straight Ahead (Dot, 1968)
- How About This (Paramount, 1969) with Kay Starr
- Standing Ovation (Dot, 1969)
- Basic Basie (MPS, 1969)
- Basie on the Beatles (Happy Tiger, 1969)

With Kenny Burrell

- Heritage (AudioSource, 1980)

With Clifford Coulter

- Do It Now! (Impulse!, 1971)

With The Gene Harris All Star Big Band

- Tribute to Count Basie (Concord Jazz, 1988)

With Coleman Hawkins

- The Saxophone Section (World Wide, 1958)

With Monk Montgomery

- Monk Montgomery in Africa...Live! (Chisa, 1975)

With Joe Newman

- Joe Newman with Woodwinds (Roulette, 1958)
