= Henry Coker =

American jazz trombonist (1919–1979)

- Born: December 24, 1919; Dallas, Texas
- Died: November 23, 1979 (aged 59); Los Angeles, California
- Genres: Jazz
- Occupation: Musician
- Instrument: Trombone

Henry Coker (December 24, 1919 – November 23, 1979) was an American jazz trombonist.

== Biography ==
Coker was born in Dallas, Texas, United States. He made his professional debut with John White in 1935. From 1937 to 1939 he played with Nat Towles's territory band, then moved to Hawaii to play with Monk McFay. After the Japanese bombed Pearl Harbor, Coker returned to California, playing with Benny Carter (1944–46), Illinois Jacquet (1945), Eddie Heywood (1946–47), and Charles Mingus (late 1940s). Coker fell ill from 1949 to 1951 and played little. After his recovery he worked with Sonny Rollins and then joined Count Basie's band, playing and recording with him from 1952 to 1963.

Coker worked as a studio musician in the 1960s, then toured with Ray Charles from 1966 to 1971. He worked freelance and in film and television studios in the mid-1970s, returning to Basie briefly in 1973 and Charles in 1976. Osie Johnson wrote a tribute to him entitled "Cokernut Tree" in 1955. Coker appeared on J.J. Johnson's Trombones Incorporated session featuring ten trombonists.

Coker died in Los Angeles at the age of 59.

== Discography ==
With Count Basie

- Dance Session (Clef, 1954)
- Basie (Clef, 1955)
- The Count! (Clef, 1955)
- Dance Session Album#2 (Clef, 1955)
- Basie Jazz (Clef, 1955)
- Count Basie Swings, Joe Williams Sings (Clef, 1955)
- Basie Roars Again (Verve, 1956)
- Count Basie and His Band That Swings the Blues (American Recording Society, 1956)
- Metronome All-Stars 1956 (Clef, 1956)
- The Greatest!! Count Basie Plays, Joe Williams Sings Standards (Verve, 1956)
- Count Basie at Newport (Verve, 1957)
- Basie in London (Verve, 1957)
- April in Paris (Verve, 1957)
- Basie Rides Again! (Verve, 1957)
- Basie Plays Hefti (Roulette, 1958)
- Breakfast Dance and Barbecue (Roulette, 1959)
- One More Time (Columbia, 1959)
- Chairman of the Board (Roulette, 1959)
- Compositions of Count Basie and Others (Crown, 1959)
- Basie/Eckstine Incorporated (Roulette, 1959)
- Hall of Fame (Verve, 1959)
- Basie One More Time (Roulette, 1959)
- Everyday I Have the Blues (Roulette, 1959)
- Sing Along with Basie (Roulette, 1959)
- Dance Along with Basie (Roulette, 1960)
- String Along with Basie (Roulette, 1960)
- Not Now, I'll Tell You When (Roulette, 1960)
- Kansas City Suite (Roulette, 1960)
- Basie at Birdland (Roulette, 1961)
- Basie in Sweden (Roulette, 1962)
- On My Way & Shoutin' Again! (Verve, 1962)
- This Time by Basie! (Reprise, 1963)
- Back with Basie (Roulette, 1964)
- The Count Basie Story (Roulette, 1969)
- Li'l Ol' Groovemaker... Basie! (Verve, 1963)
- Big Band Scene '65 (Roulette, 1965)
- Count at the Organ (Verve, 1965)
- Inside Basie Outside (VSP, 1966)
- Arthur Prysock/Count Basie (Verve, 1966)
- Basie Easin' It (Roulette, 1976)

With others

- Ernestine Anderson, Moanin' (Mercury, 1960)
- Donald Byrd, I'm Tryin' to Get Home (Blue Note, 1965)
- Ray Charles, Genius + Soul = Jazz (Impulse!, 1961)
- Ray Charles, At the Club (Philips, 1966)
- Kenny Clarke, Telefunken Blues (Savoy, 1955)
- Nat King Cole, Welcome to the Club (Capitol, 1959)
- Papa John Creach, Filthy! (Grunt, 1972)
- Tadd Dameron, Fontainebleu (Prestige, 1956)
- Sammy Davis Jr., I Gotta Right to Swing (Brunswick, 1960)
- Sammy Davis Jr./Count Basie, Our Shining Hour (Verve, 1979)
- Ella Fitzgerald, One O'Clock Jump (Verve, 1957)
- Frank Foster, No 'Count (Savoy, 1956)
- Slim Gaillard, Son of McVouty (Hep, 1978)
- Dizzy Gillespie, The Greatest Trumpet of Them All (Verve, 1959)
- Freddie Green, Mr. Rhythm (RCA Victor, 1956)
- Eddie Heywood, Lightly and Politely (Decca, 1956)
- Milt Jackson, Meet Milt Jackson (Savoy, 1956)
- Illinois Jacquet, Black Velvet (RCA Victor, 1955)
- Thad Jones, Mad Thad (Period, 1957)
- Leiber-Stoller Big Band, Yakety Yak (Atlantic, 1960)
- Grover Mitchell, Meet Grover Mitchell (Jazz Chronicles 1979)
- Paul Quinichette, The Vice Pres (EmArcy, 1955)
- Paul Quinichette, The Kid From Denver (Dawn, 1956)
- Sonny Rollins/Thad Jones, Sonny Rollins Plays Jazz (Historical, 1972)
- Sonny Rollins/Thad Jones/Zoot Sims, Hot Cool Modern (Jazztone, 1959)
- Diana Ross, Lady Sings the Blues (Motown, 1972)
- Tony Scott, The Complete Tony Scott (RCA Victor, 1957)
- Frank Sinatra/Count Basie, Sinatra/Basie: An Historic Musical First (Reprise, 1962)
- Frank Sinatra/Count Basie, It Might as Well Be Swing (Reprise, 1964)
- Stanley Turrentine, Joyride (Blue Note, 1965)
- Sarah Vaughan, After Hours at the London House (Mercury, 1958)
- Sarah Vaughan, No Count Sarah (Mercury, 1959)
- Eddie "Cleanhead" Vinson, Clean Head's Back in Town (Bethlehem, 1957)
- Frank Wess, North, South, East....Wess (Savoy, 1956)
- Frank Wess, Trombones (Savoy, 1956)
- Frank Wess, The Award Winner (Mainstream, 1964)
- Joe Williams, Everyday I Have the Blues (Roulette, 1979)

== Other sources ==
- Henry Coker at AllMusic
- Leonard Feather and Ira Gitler, The Biographical Encyclopedia of Jazz. Oxford, 1999, p. 137.
