= String Along with Basie =

Studio album by Count Basie
- Released: 1960
- Recorded: July 20, 1959 and May 10 & 11, 1960; New York City
- Genre: Jazz
- Label: Roulette; SR 52051
- Producer: Teddy Reig

Count Basie chronology
Dance Along with Basie (1959)	String Along with Basie (1960)	Not Now, I'll Tell You When (1960)

String Along with Basie is an album by pianist, composer and bandleader Count Basie accompanied by a small band and string section on tracks recorded in 1959 and 1960 and originally released on the Roulette label.

== Reception ==
Professional ratings
Review scores
Source	Rating
AllMusic	4.5/5 stars

AllMusic awarded the album 4½ stars.

== Track listing ==
1. "Summertime" (George Gershwin, DuBose Heyward) - 2:52
2. "Song of the Islands" (Chas. E. King) - 4:14
3. "Stringing the Blues" (Jimmy Jones) - 4:07
4. "The One I Love" (Isham Jones, Gus Kahn) - 3:35
5. "Blue and Sentimental" (Count Basie, Jerry Livingston, Mack David) - 3:34
6. "Blues Bittersweet" (Quincy Jones) - 2:38
7. "Poor Butterfly" (John Golden, Raymond Hubbell) - 4:15
8. "These Foolish Things Remind Me of You" (Holt Marvell, Harry Link, Jack Strachey) - 4:32
9. "She's Funny That Way (I Got A Woman Crazy For Me)" (Neil Moret, Richard Whiting) – 3:14
10. "Sweet Lorraine" (Cliff Burwell, Mitchell Parish) - 3:15
- Recorded in New York City on July 20, 1959 (tracks 5, 6 & 8) and May 10 & 11, 1960 (tracks 1–4, 7, 9 & 10)

== Personnel ==
- Count Basie - piano
- Freddie Green - guitar
- George Duvivier - bass
- Jimmy Crawford - drums
- Unidentified string orchestra
- Henry Coker, Al Grey, Benny Powell - trombone (tracks 5, 6 & 8)
- Illinois Jacquet (tracks 1–4, 7, 9 & 10), Ben Webster (tracks 5, 6 & 8) - tenor saxophone
- Herbie Mann, Frank Wess - flute (tracks 1–4, 7, 9 & 10)
- Andy Fitzgerald - bass flute, bass clarinet (tracks 1–4, 7, 9 & 10)
- Quincy Jones (tracks 5, 6 & 8), George Williams (tracks 1–4, 7, 9 & 10) - arrangers
