= Snap Yo Fingers (disambiguation) =

"Snap Yo Fingers" can refer to either of two songs:

- A 2006 song by Lil Jon featuring E-40 & Sean P of YoungBloodZ
- An unreleased 2008 song by T-Pain and Lil Wayne (T-Wayne), later released in 2017 as "Snap Ya Fangas" on T-Wayne

See also

- Snap Your Fingers (Al Grey album), 1962
- "Snap Your Fingers", a 1962 song by Joe Henderson
- "Snap Your Fingers, Snap Your Neck", a 1994 song by Prong from Cleansing
