= The Count Basie Story =

Studio album by Count Basie and His Orchestra
- Released: 1961
- Recorded: June 7–9, 14–6 & 22–24 and July 12 & 13, 1960
- Studio: Capitol (New York City)
- Genre: Jazz
- Labels: Roulette; SRB-1
- Producer: Teddy Reig

Count Basie chronology
Not Now, I'll Tell You When (1960)	The Count Basie Story (1961)	Kansas City Suite (1960)

Count Basie Story is a double album by pianist, composer and bandleader Count Basie featuring tracks originally performed by his orchestra in the 1930s and 1940s rerecorded in 1960 as a celebration of its 25th anniversary and first released on the Roulette label. Selections from the 2-LP set were also released as Roulette's The Best of Basie in 1962 and The Best of Basie Vol. 2 in 1964. The album was rereleased with bonus tracks in 2004 to commemorate Basie's 100th birthday.

== Reception ==
Professional ratings
Review scores
Source	Rating
AllMusic	3.5/5 stars
All About Jazz	3/5 stars
DownBeat	4/5 stars

AllMusic awarded the album 3½ stars and its review by Scott Yanow states, "These sides were hotly contested when originally issued because of the contrast in accents between the 1937 band and the later one. The sound is so different that it cannot be compared to the pure and bluesy dance band swing of the originals; it is amped up and brassy, with charts (written by Royal or Neal Hefti) that stress tempo and sophisticated ensemble playing rather than riff-based solos, busyness, and dynamics. For any serious Basie fan, these sides are essential".

DownBeat's reviewer John S. Wilson assigned the release 4 stars. He wrote of the then newly recorded versions of the Basie repertory,"These new versions are smooth, polished, and cleanly recorded, and they often swing with rugged fury". But he lamented, "this essentially ensemble band is no match for the collection of brilliant soloists who made up that earlier Basie team . . . Like any re-creations of performances as vital as those by the original Basie band, these fall short of the mark . . . the originals are still the ones to have and to hear".

== Track listing ==
Disc One:

1. "Broadway" (Billy Bird, Teddy McRae, Henri Woode) – 3:23
2. "Down for Double" (Freddie Green) – 2:59
3. "Lester Leaps In" (Lester Young) – 4:17
4. "Topsy" (Edgar Battle, Eddie Durham) – 3:42
5. "Jumpin' at the Woodside" (Count Basie) – 3:11
6. "Taps Miller" (Basie, Bob Russell) – 3:22
7. "Shorty George" (Basie, Andy Gibson) – 2:56
8. "Doggin' Around" (Battle, Herschel Evans) – 3:01
9. "Avenue C" (Buck Clayton) – 2:33
10. "Jive at Five" (Basie, Harry Edison) – 3:02
11. "Rock-a-Bye Basie" (Basie, Shad Collins, Young) – 3:37
12. "Moten Swing" (Bennie Moten, Buster Moten) – 4:50 Bonus track on CD reissue

Disc Two:

1. "Swingin' the Blues" (Basie, Durham) – 3:17
2. "Sent for You Yesterday (And Here You Come Today)" (Basie, Durham, Jimmy Rushing) – 3:09
3. "Tickle Toe" (Young) – 2:36
4. "Blue and Sentimental" (Basie, Mack David, Jerry Livingston) – 4:07
5. "Time Out" (Battle, Durham) – 2:46
6. "9:20 Special" (Earle Warren, William Engvick) – 3:49
7. "Red Bank Boogie" (Basie, Clayton) – 2:15
8. "Every Tub" (Basie, Durham) – 3:11
9. "Dickie's Dream" (Basie, Young) – 4:09
10. "Texas Shuffle" (Battle, Evans) – 3:12
11. "Out the Window" (Basie, Durham) – 2:52
12. "Boogie Woogie" (Basie, Rushing) – 3:06
13. "Good Morning Blues" (Basie, Durham, Rushing) – 2:52 Bonus track on CD reissue
14. "Gee, Baby, Ain't I Good to You" (Andy Razaf, Don Redman) – 2:31 Bonus track on CD reissue

== Personnel ==
- Count Basie – piano
- John Anderson (Disc Two, track 13), Sonny Cohn (out on Disc One, track 12 and Disc Two, tracks 13 & 14), Wendell Culley (Disc One, track 12 and Disc Two, track 14), Thad Jones (out on Disc One track 10, Disc Two Track 5), Joe Newman, Jimmy Nottingham (Disc One track 10, Disc Two Track 5), Snooky Young – trumpet
- Henry Coker, Al Grey (out on Disc Two, track 14), Bill Hughes (Disc Two, track 14), Benny Powell – trombone
- Marshal Royal – alto saxophone, clarinet
- Frank Wess – alto saxophone, tenor saxophone, flute
- Eddie "Lockjaw" Davis (Disc Two, track 14), Frank Foster (out on Disc One track 10, Disc Two Track 5), Billy Mitchell (out on Disc Two, track 14), Seldon Powell (Disc One track 10, Disc Two Track 5) – tenor saxophone
- Charlie Fowlkes – baritone saxophone
- Freddie Green – guitar
- Eddie Jones – bass
- Gus Johnson (Disc One, track 1, Disc Two, tracks 2 & 12), Sonny Payne (all others) – drums
- Joe Williams – vocals (Disc Two, tracks 2 & 12–14)
