= The Al Grey – Billy Mitchell Sextet =

Live album by Al Grey – Billy Mitchell Sextet
- Released: 1962
- Recorded: July 6, 1961
- Venue: Museum of Modern Art, NYC
- Genre: Jazz
- Length: 28:19
- Label: Argo; LP-689
- Producer: Ralph Bass

Billy Mitchell chronology
Dizzy Atmosphere (1957)	The Al Grey – Billy Mitchell Sextet (1962)	This Is Billy Mitchell (1962)

Al Grey chronology
The Thinking Man’s Trombone (1960)	The Al Grey – Billy Mitchell Sextet (1961)	Snap Your Fingers (1962)

The Al Grey – Billy Mitchell Sextet is an album by trombonist Al Grey and saxophonist Billy Mitchell, released in 1961 on Argo Records.

Professional ratings
Review scores
Source	Rating
Allmusic	3/5 stars

== Track listing ==
1. "Bluish Grey" (Thad Jones) – 4:35
2. "Wild Deuce" (Gene Kee) – 3:18
3. "On Green Dolphin Street" (Bronisław Kaper, Ned Washington) – 2:47
4. "Bantu" (Randy Weston) – 3:05
5. "Melba's Blues" (Melba Liston) – 6:40
6. "Home Fries" (Kee) – 3:00
7. "Grey's Blues" (Al Grey) – 4:54

== Personnel ==
- Al Grey – trombone, baritone saxophone
- Billy Mitchell – tenor saxophone, alto saxophone
- Henry Boozier – trumpet
- Gene Kee – piano, alto saxophone
- Art Davis – bass
- Jule Curtis – drums
- Ray Barreto – congas
