= The Thinking Man's Trombone =

The Thinking Man’s Trombone

Studio album by Al Grey
- Released: 1961
- Recorded: August 23–25, 1960
- Venues: Ter-Mar Studios, Chicago, IL
- Genre: Jazz
- Length: 34:19
- Labels: Argo; LP-677
- Producer: Jack Tracy

Al Grey chronology
| The Last of the Big Plungers (1959) | The Thinking Man’s Trombone (1961) | The Al Grey - Billy Mitchell Sextet (1961) |

The Thinking Man's Trombone is an album by trombonist Al Grey released in 1961 on Argo Records.

== Reception ==
Professional ratings
Review scores
| Source | Rating |
|---|---|
| Allmusic | 4/5 stars |

The Allmusic review by Scott Yanow stated: "A boppish trombonist who was a master at using the plunger mute (crossing over into swing), Grey holds his own on this set ... Swinging and witty music".

== Track listing ==
1. "Salty Papa" (Al Grey) – 5:50
2. "Don't Cry Baby" (James P. Johnson, Saul Bernie, Stella Unger) – 2:24
3. "Stranded" (Frank Foster) – 5:30
4. "Rompin'" (Foster) – 4:00
5. "King Bee" (Al Grey) – 6:14
6. "When I Fall in Love" (Victor Young) – 2:32
7. "Al-amo" (Thad Jones) – 5:25
8. "Tenderly" (Walter Gross, Jack Lawrence) – 2:24

== Personnel ==
Performers:

- Al Grey – trombone, bandleader
- Joe Newman – trumpet
- Benny Powell – trombone
- Billy Mitchell – tenor saxophone
- Charlie Fowlkes – baritone saxophone
- Eddie Higgins – piano (tracks 1–7)
- Freddie Green – guitar (tracks 1–7)
- Ed Jones – bass (tracks 1–7)
- Sonny Payne – drums (tracks 1–7)

Arrangers:

- Al Grey – arranger (tracks 1 & 5)
- Thad Jones – arranger (tracks 2 & 7)
- Frank Foster – arranger (tracks 3 & 4)
- Nat Pierce – arranger (track 6)
- Clare Fischer – arranger (track 8) (Note: Note that this was not specifically arranged for this album, as it is identical to Fischer's earlier arrangement of the same song for The Hi-Lo's.)
