= Betsy Braddock =

Character appearing in Marvel Comics

- Various incarnations of Betsy Braddock on the cover of Hellions #13 (September 2021). Art by Russell Dauterman.

Publication information
- Publisher: Marvel Comics
- First appearance: As Betsy Braddock: Captain Britain #8 (December 1976); As Captain Britain: Captain Britain #2 (January 1986); As Psylocke: The New Mutants Annual #2 (October 1986)
- Created by: Chris Claremont (writer); Herb Trimpe (artist)

In-story information
- Full name: Elizabeth "Betsy" Braddock
- Species: Human mutant-Otherworlder hybrid
- Team affiliations: S.T.R.I.K.E. X-Men; The Hand; Exiles; X-Force; Horsemen of Apocalypse; Excalibur; Captain Britain Corps
- Partnerships: Brian Braddock; Jamie Braddock; Kwannon; Warren Worthington; Rachel Summers
- Notable aliases: Captain Britain; Psylocke; Lady Mandarin
- Abilities: Telepathy; Telekinesis; Precognition; Generation of psychic blades and weapons; Master martial artist, hand-to-hand combatant, and swordswoman

Elizabeth "Betsy" Braddock is a superheroine appearing in American comic books published by Marvel Comics. Created by writer Chris Claremont and artist Herb Trimpe, she first appeared in Captain Britain #8 (1976). Introduced as the precognitive twin sister of Brian Braddock, Betsy is later established as a mutant, a subspecies of humans in the Marvel Universe born with an "X-gene" that grants superhuman abilities. Possessing telepathic and telekinetic powers, Betsy joins the X-Men in 1986 as the first incarnation of Psylocke.

Betsy was redesigned in a 1989 story written by Claremont and illustrated by Jim Lee as a Japanese assassin with ninja skills and the ability to manifest her telepathy in the form of various weapons, most notably a "psychic knife", and this revamp proved so popular with fans that it was made permanent. In 1993, writer Fabian Nicieza retroactively revealed that this change in appearance was the result of a body swap with the newly-created character Kwannon. Following nearly 30 years of publication history, both women were returned to their original bodies, and Betsy took up the mantle of Captain Britain from her brother while Kwannon became the new Psylocke. A new series about Betsy's time as Psylocke, Psylocke: Ninja – Rise from the Fall, was published in 2025.

The character has been adapted in various media incarnations, including films, television series, and video games.

== Publication history ==
=== Origins ===
Betsy Braddock becomes the new Captain Britain in Captain Britain, (vol. 2) #13. Art by Alan Davis.

Created by writer Chris Claremont, Elizabeth "Betsy" Braddock first appeared in Captain Britain #8 (December 1976), with Captain Britain #10 (December 1976) as her first cover appearance, published by the Marvel Comics' British imprint Marvel UK. The original spelling of the character's name was "Elizabeth", though relettering of the UK versions for American reprints would occasionally misspell it as "Elisabeth". This led to spelling inconsistencies throughout future publications. The inconsistency was resolved by Claremont 32 years later in 2008 in the series New Exiles, which reasserted the particular spelling of her name as "Elizabeth". In the Captain Britain series, Claremont introduced her as a supporting character, the sister of Brian Braddock, the eponymous Captain Britain, and established her career as a charter pilot. He also established that she had psychic abilities, the full extent of which were unknown, though no explanation is given for these powers. In Marvel UK's Super Spider-Man and Captain Britain #243 (October 1977), Betsy Braddock is presented as a professional model.

In Marvel UK's Daredevils #3 (March 1983), Alan Moore established that the character has begun to work for the fictional governmental organization S.T.R.I.K.E., who are making use of her psychic abilities. Her lover Tom Lennox is also a S.T.R.I.K.E operative and is later murdered. The story also presents the character as having dyed her hair purple after being blonde; this hair color has subsequently become the dominant presentation of the character. The next major change for the character came in the 1986 relaunched Captain Britain series, where Betsy Braddock stands in for her brother as Captain Britain, and is rendered blind by the supervillain Slaymaster.

=== X-Men ===
Cover of Psylocke #1 (2010), her first self-titled issue. Art by David Finch.

In New Mutants Annual #2 (1986), Claremont integrated Betsy Braddock into the X-Men franchise. The story sees her abducted to the Mojoverse, where she is subjected to brainwashing, fitted with bionic eyes, and referred to as "the Psylocke" for the first time. After being rescued by the New Mutants, she takes up residence at their mutant-training academy, run by Magneto at the time in the absence of Professor Charles Xavier. After aiding the team unofficially, Braddock proves herself by distracting the attentions of the murderous supervillain Sabretooth. Afterward, Braddock is formally invited to join the X-Men and officially adopts the codename "Psylocke", becoming an enduring fixture of the team over the next three decades.

Initially written as a pure non-mutant telepath with few fighting skills, Betsy later adopts body armor. In The Uncanny X-Men #251 (November 1989), the X-Men flee from the cybernetic terrorists, the Reavers, through the Siege Perilous, an extra-dimensional teleportation device. The now-amnesiac Betsy is taken in by the Hand, who brainwash and physically alter her to take on an East Asian appearance so that she can blend in in Hong Kong. Braddock now believes herself to be "Lady Mandarin", the Hand's supreme assassin. After she is rescued by the X-Men's Wolverine and overcomes her brainwashing, the character retains the combat skills granted through the Hand's modification techniques as well as the ability to manifest her total focused telepathy in the form of a "psychic knife".

With the launch of the second volume of X-Men (later rebranded X-Men: Legacy) in 1991, the team splits, with Betsy joining the team led by Cyclops. In Jim Lee-written issues, the character becomes flirtatious with Cyclops, eventually attempting to seduce him. At this point, Kwannon, a new character with the physical appearance of Betsy prior to the Hand's manipulation, claims to be the original Betsy Braddock, accusing the Asian-featured Betsy of being an impostor. After Jim Lee and six other creators left Marvel Comics to found Image Comics, new scriptwriter Fabian Nicieza established that Kwannon is the impostor and that Braddock's flirtations with Cyclops were part of a genetic and mental splicing in which the Kwannon impostor was first created, a body swap having occurred.

In 1994, writer Scott Lobdell set up a relationship between Betsy Braddock and her teammate Archangel. The character is severely injured by a crazed Sabretooth in the Lobdell-written The Uncanny X-Men #328. Her life is saved by the use of a mystic artifact known as the Crimson Dawn, the aftereffects of which granted Betsy the ability to teleport in and out of shadows. Lobdell also temporarily took her out of the X-Men roster this issue. Braddock returns to the team in X-Men (vol. 2) #77–78, where she uses her Crimson Dawn-enhanced telepathy to trap the Shadow King in the astral plane. Any use of her telepathy would result in his release, so she forgoes the use of her telepathic ability. Some time later she would develop telekinesis for the first time instead. Betsy's relationship with Archangel ends in the Claremont written X-Men (vol. 2) #109, where the character embarks upon a relationship with new Indian X-Men recruit Neal Shaara, also known as Thunderbird.

In the Claremont-written X-Treme X-Men #2 (2001), the character dies, her comic book death lasting until 2005's The Uncanny X-Men #455; Claremont also wrote this issue, later stating he had always intended to revive her. Briefly, the character was depicted in Exiles, a spin-off comic-book series in the X-Men franchise, set in an alternate universe. With the cancellation of New Exiles, Betsy Braddock starred in her first solo book, the X-Men: Sword of The Braddocks one-shot. Afterwards, the character was brought back to the main Marvel Universe in early 2009 within the pages of The Uncanny X-Men.

In addition to appearing in many X-related team titles over the decades, Psylocke (both Betsy Braddock and Kwannon) have appeared in several limited series. In the year of 1997, the characters appeared in the 4-issue team-up series Psylocke and Archangel: Crimson Dawn. Beginning in November 2009, Betsy Braddock was featured in X-Men: Psylocke a self-titled four issue miniseries written by Christopher Yost and drawn by Harvey Tolibao; Matsu'o Tsurayaba and Wolverine are central characters in the story.

=== Captain Britain ===
At the 2019 San Diego Comic-Con, Editor-in-Chief C. B. Cebulski and writer Jonathan Hickman revealed that, following the franchise-wide relaunch House of X/Powers of X, Betsy Braddock would become the new Captain Britain, with Brian adopting the new title of Captain Avalon and Kwannon taking over the Psylocke moniker. Cebulski compared Betsy's adoption of the Captain Britain mantle to Carol Danvers's transition to Captain Marvel. As part of the Dawn of X, a new volume of Excalibur written by Tini Howard was launched, with Braddock leading a new lineup of the titular team consisting of herself, Gambit, Rogue, Jubilee, Rictor, and Apocalypse. Braddock was included as a central character in the X of Swords crossover by Howard and Hickman. Following the completion of Howard's Excalibur run, Braddock was featured in the Knights of X miniseries and Captain Britain: Betsy Braddock, with Betsy and her long-time friend Rachel Summers confessing their romantic feelings for each other, with their kiss shown in a splash page. A new series about Betsy once again as Psylocke, Psylocke: Ninja – Rise from the Fall (originally known simply as Psylocke: Ninja), was published in 2025.

== Fictional character biography ==
=== Background ===
Elizabeth "Betsy" Braddock was born in England and was raised in the small town of Maldon, Essex. Betsy was Sir James Braddock's second child, born minutes before her twin brother Brian. The twins and their elder brother Jamie, who was nearly a decade older, had a very privileged life. By the time she entered college, Betsy had become a charter pilot. After she and Jamie were taken hostage by the Red Skull's agents and freed by Captain America and Captain Britain, Betsy learned the latter was her brother Brian. At this time Betsy began to develop precognitive powers. She dyed her hair purple and took up modeling. At the age of twenty-one, her psychic powers fully manifested, which grew to include telepathy. Agent Matthew recruited Betsy into S.T.R.I.K.E.'s Psi Division, and she became fellow psi Tom Lennox's lover. As she had inherited membership to the Hellfire Club from her father, Betsy was sent to infiltrate it, but was warned off by Tessa for her own protection. She also met future boyfriend Warren Worthington for the first time during one of the Hellfire Club parties.

When the crime lord Vixen hired Slaymaster to eliminate the Psi-Division, only Betsy, Tom Lennox, and their friend Alison Double were left when Brian defeated him. When reality warped due to the powers of Mad Jim Jaspers, Tom sacrificed himself to give the Braddocks time to escape from a group of superhero hunters. Betsy was in Tom's mind when he died; feeling his death, she was left traumatized. Following the repair of the reality warp, an evil version of Captain Britain from another universe named Kaptain Briton switched places with Brian. The double tried to rape Betsy. In self-defense, she telepathically killed him. The same night, the twins were informed of their father's Otherworld origins, and a new intelligence agency called R.C.X. asked them to billet Warpies, children transformed by Jaspers' warp, at the Manor, which led to an argument between Betsy and Brian.

==== As Captain Britain ====
When Brian went overseas, Matthew (now codenamed Gabriel) convinced Betsy to become the new Captain Britain, wearing Kaptain Briton's modified costume. Working with Captain UK, the duo became public sensations. After several months, crime boss Vixen lured Betsy into a showdown with Slaymaster. During the battle, Betsy called Vixen a "hag", which angered her. Vixen instructed Slaymaster that she wanted Betsy's eyes, so he brutally beat Betsy, then gouged her eyes out. Brian flew to her rescue and killed Slaymaster as Vixen escaped. Betsy refused R.C.X.'s offer of cybernetic eyes, preferring to rely on her psychic abilities to "see". She and Gabriel went to former S.T.R.I.K.E. Psi co-agent Alison Double's Switzerland chateau for Betsy to recuperate.

==== As Psylocke ====
Betsy was kidnapped from the Alps by Mojo, brainwashed, given cybernetic eyes, and, as "Psylocke", became the star of his new show "Wildways". Brian and the New Mutants rescued her, after which Betsy moved to the X-Men's mansion to recover, exactly where Roma, Guardian of the Omniverse, needed her to be. When the Marauders attacked the Morlocks, the X-Mansion was used as a temporary infirmary for injured survivors of the massacre. Knowing that the X-Men were away in New York, the Marauder Sabretooth invaded the mansion. Betsy used herself as bait to lead him away from the injured until the X-Men arrived to help her. While Sabretooth and Wolverine fought, Betsy used her telepathy to gather information about the Marauders and their leader, Mr. Sinister, from Sabretooth's mind. Wolverine, though initially reluctant to involve outsiders in the X-Men's affairs, was impressed by her bravery and nominated her to join the team.

As an X-Man she met Mephisto, Dr. Doom and the Fantastic Four, and the Horde. The X-Men later battled Freedom Force and the Adversary in Dallas, and, in a televised battle, sacrificed themselves to allow Forge to bind the Adversary; Roma secretly restored them to life, and gave Betsy the Siege Perilous, which they could use if they ever wanted to start new lives. The X-Men moved to the Reavers' Australian Outback base, from where they took on the Brood, Genoshan Magistrates, Mister Sinister and the Goblin Queen, M Squad, Mr. Jip and the Serpent Society, Master Mold and Nimrod, Nanny and Orphan-Maker, and Zaladane and the Savage Land Mutates. As they were about to depart the Savage Land, Betsy had a precognitive flash of the Reavers killing the team. To prevent this, she telepathically "convinces" them to abandon the Outback, and subsequently sends them through the Siege Perilous.

=== Lady Mandarin and body swap ===
Betsy in her "Lady Mandarin" armor and with the Crimson Dawn tattoo, on the cover of New Exiles #9: "Soul Awakening" (art by Alex Garner)

Betsy reappeared amnesiac on an island near China, where the Hand, a ninja clan, found her. Matsu'o Tsurayaba, their leader, saw a chance to save his brain-dead lover, Kwannon. Spiral informed Matsu'o that Betsy's telepathy could restore Kwannon, and Matsu'o accepted. Unknown to Matsu'o, however, Spiral actually placed the two women's minds into each other's bodies. She also merged their genetic structures, leaving both women with physical and mental traits of the other, and with each possessing half of Betsy's telepathic power. With some physical and mental conditioning, Betsy—inhabiting Kwannon's body—became the Hand's prime assassin, taking the name Lady Mandarin. She gained highly remarkable fighting skills and learned to focus her telepathic power into a "psychic knife". Lady Mandarin's first mission pitted her against Wolverine. Betsy's psychic knife attack revealed Wolverine's memories of who she used to be and allowed her to break free from the Hand's conditioning.

Betsy rejected her role as Lady Mandarin and escaped with Wolverine and Jubilee, eventually going with them to the island nation of Genosha, where the New Mutants had been kidnapped along with the X-Men's leader, Storm, by Cameron Hodge. Following Hodge's defeat, the X-Men reunited and returned to New York. Betsy then joined the Blue Team led by Cyclops, for whom she displayed an obvious attraction. When Phoenix found out, the two women fought, but were interrupted by the arrival of Kwannon, now calling herself Revanche, in Betsy's former body, claiming to be the real Betsy. Unable to discern which was truly Betsy, both stayed with the X-Men, maintaining an uneasy coexistence. Learning she had the Legacy Virus, Revanche had Matsu'o kill her, restoring Betsy's full personality and telepathic potential. Having become involved with her teammate Angel, the following months saw her fight the Phalanx, try to reach Jamie's comatose mind, battle Legion in Israel, and combat Gene Nation.

=== Crimson Dawn ===
Betsy was gutted by Sabretooth which led Angel, Wolverine, Doctor Strange and Gomurr the Ancient to retrieve a magical liquid from the Crimson Dawn dimension to heal her. This gave her the new ability to teleport through shadows, also marking her with a red tattoo over her left eye. Her personality took on a cold edge, which created distance between her and Warren. Kuragari, Proctor of the Crimson Dawn, tried to claim Betsy as his bride, but was thwarted with Gomurr and Angel's aid, freeing Betsy of the Dawn's influence. Betsy retained the abilities associated with it. Soon after these events, the couple retired from active duty with the X-Men.

Subsequently, she aided Storm against the Shadow King, who tricked Betsy into initiating a psychic shockwave that disabled all other telepaths, leaving him unchallenged on the astral plane. Her own astral form was destroyed, but her exposure to the Crimson Dawn gave her a new shadow form with temporarily enhanced powers, which she used to trap the Shadow King's core. To keep him trapped she was forced to constantly focus her telepathy on him, effectively rendering herself powerless.

=== Revolution and X-Treme ===
Jean Grey's attempt to help Betsy deal with the Shadow King somehow swapped their powers, leaving Betsy telekinetic. With her new abilities Betsy fought Belasco, the Neo, the Goth, the Crimson Pirates, the Twisted Sisters, and the Prime Sentinels, then aided her brother freeing Otherworld from Mastermind's Warpie army. After ending her relationship with Archangel, Betsy joined Storm's X-Treme X-Men team in the search for Destiny's diaries.

In Valencia, Betsy died in combat with the man known as Vargas while protecting Rogue and Beast, who were badly beaten by the villain. Brian Braddock and Meggan collected Betsy's body from Spain. She was buried at the Braddock family estate and a memorial to her was erected at the X-Mansion by Beast.

=== Resurrection ===
One year after her death, Betsy awoke where she had died, unaware of how she had been resurrected, and was soon reunited with the X-Men, helping them against the Saurian Hauk'ka, and Mojo and Spiral. Jamie started to covertly observe his resurrected sister, allowing her to catch occasional glimpses of him. Betsy was reunited with Brian during the Scarlet Witch's "House of M" reality storm. When the timeline was set right, the memories of their encounter took on a dreamlike state, prompting Betsy and several of the X-Men to visit London to check on Brian's status.

Back in the US, Betsy and the X-Men failed to stop Shi'ar Death Commandos from slaughtering the Grey family, targeted for death because of their relationship to Phoenix, but helped defeat them before they could kill Rachel Grey. With the First Fallen's servants, the Foursaken, about to make their move, Jamie revealed his part in Betsy's resurrection to the X-Men: sensing the approaching threat of the cosmically powerful First Fallen (a harbinger of frozen, eternal "perfection") and learning of Betsy's demise, an annoyed Jamie resurrected her, reaching back through time to stop her spirit passing into the afterlife. Intending her to be a weapon to use against the First Fallen, Jamie tightened up the "quantum strings" of Betsy's body, rendering her mostly immune to external manipulation, enhancing her telekinetic powers, and leaving her invisible to the First Fallen's senses. Jamie was abducted by the Foursaken before he could fully inform them of the imminent threat; trying to rescue him, the X-Men were easily captured, except Betsy, who found herself invisible to the Foursaken's senses. Disrupting their attempt to give the First Fallen full access to Earth, Betsy and the X-Men were pulled into his realm, the Singing City, where Betsy's immunity to his mental control allowed her to free the city's residents, including the Foursaken, from his dominance. As a wrathful First Fallen turned on them, Jamie sent the X-Men home while he held the entity back, apparently sacrificing himself.

Returning to the UK to tell Brian of Jamie's fate, Betsy learned that Shadow Xavier, leader of the Shadow X-Men, had taken over the minds of his jailors in Crossmore Prison, and was demanding to see her. Accompanied by Excalibur, Betsy visited the prison, where Xavier revealed his true identity as the Shadow King, and tried to take revenge, having Excalibur attack Brian so that Betsy could witness his death; however, immune to his control, Betsy telekinetically induced a stroke in Xavier's body, freeing Excalibur. Before she could finish him off, Betsy was interdimensionally teleported to the Crystal Palace at the Nexus of All Realities.

=== Exiles ===
Appearing at the headquarters of the Exiles, heroes gathered from several realities to protect the Omniverse; both the Exiles' choice of Betsy as latest recruit, and the timing of same, were apparently the result of Roma's manipulations, again moving one of her pawns to where it would soon be needed as part of a greater plan. Her first mission with the Exiles brought Betsy face to face with Earth-1720's Slaymaster, brutally reminding her of her reality's Slaymaster blinding her. After escaping, Slaymaster-1720 began murdering Betsy Braddock in each reality he visited.

Meanwhile, determined to confront her fear, Betsy began rigorous training to prepare herself for their next encounter. She returned to Earth-616 to let Brian know she was alive. Almost immediately both the Exiles and Excalibur were called to the defense of Otherworld, under attack by an army of Furies created by a resurrected Mad Jim Jaspers; though the heroes prevailed, the Exiles were left as the Omniverse's primary defenders until the devastated Captain Britain Corps could be rebuilt. Choosing to remain with the Exiles, Betsy traveled to several realities. Upon arriving on a certain Earth, Betsy had a mental breakdown due to her counterpart of this world's psyche being at war with Betsy's own psyche to control her body. This reality's Ogun approached Betsy and offered to train her so she could avenge the death of his apprentice, who was killed by Slaymaster. Betsy eventually tracked him to Earth-616 and killed him. Betsy returned to the Crystal Palace, became involved with teammate Sabretooth, and promised to honor her mission as an Exile.

=== Return ===
Somehow, Betsy became trapped between parallel worlds and was rescued by Madelyne Pryor – now calling herself the Red Queen – who controlled her to join the Sisterhood. They also stole Betsy's original body, in which Kwannon had died, at a graveyard. A ritual of sorts with both bodies was performed, resulting in Betsy's original body being brought back to life. The Sisterhood, now including a brainwashed Betsy, attacked the X-Men. Dazzler was forced to use her powers on Betsy, blowing half of her face off. Dazzler's attack shocked Betsy back to consciousness, enabling her to overcome the Red Queen's control and return to her Japanese body.

After these events, Betsy's powers changed once again; she now possessed both telepathic and telekinetic abilities, but with her psionic potential divided between them, neither ability is as strong as it once was. The following days saw Betsy travel back in time alongside Beast's X-Club. Betsy also led the X-Club in a mission to raise Asteroid M, which was at the bottom of the Pacific Ocean, to serve as the X-Men's new base of operations and a haven for mutantkind, called Utopia. Soon after, Betsy went to Japan with Wolverine to re-inter her former body. Upon arriving, she was ambushed by the Hand, who destroyed her original body at the behest of Matsu'o Tsurayaba. Enraged, Betsy tracked Matsu'o down, finding him terribly disfigured as the result of Wolverine's yearly revenge on Matsu'o for his role in the murder of Mariko Yashida. Matsu'o, now missing both hands and other body parts, desired an honorable death and wanted Betsy to grant him that honor since he could not hold a blade to perform seppuku himself. This put Betsy at odds with Wolverine, who felt that Matsu'o's punishment was not over yet. Betsy engaged Wolverine in a brutal fight which ended in a truce. With Wolverine's permission, Betsy finished Matsu'o off mercifully, using her telepathy to project illusions into his mind of his body restored and of Kwannon embracing him. Betsy quickly killed him with her psi-blade.

During the Nation X storyline, Betsy, Wolverine, and Colossus were sent down into the sewers under San Francisco to investigate the case of a missing Predator X. They ran into Fantomex, who had slain the beast. Betsy battled Sublime's associates with the help of Fantomex and her teammates. During the Necrosha storyline, Betsy joined Rogue's team sent to Muir Island to battle the resurrected Proteus. Betsy appeared to have lost her immunity to telepathic attacks and reality alterations, as Proteus easily possessed her. However, her psi-blade was able to break his hold on his hosts. Following the return of Cable and Hope Summers, Betsy was selected as part of Cyclops' "Alpha roster" of X-Men sent to locate and protect the two from the forces of Bastion.

=== Uncanny X-Force ===
In the aftermath of "X-Men: Second Coming", Betsy (along with Deadpool, Fantomex, and Archangel) was selected by Wolverine to be a member of the new X-Force; the sole condition being that no one could learn of the team's existence. Betsy had been using her telepathy to help Warren control the "Archangel" persona in his mind, which led to the two rekindling their previous relationship. The team's first mission was to locate and kill Apocalypse, who had been reborn. Upon discovering that the reborn Apocalypse was a child, most of the team decided against killing him, but Fantomex fatally shot the boy. With X-Force, Betsy also faced long-time rivals such as the Reavers and the Shadow King. The latter succeeded in freeing the Archangel persona in Warren. To prevent Archangel's ascension into Apocalypse, X-Force traveled to the Age of Apocalypse to seek a Life Seed, which could cleanse Warren. Betsy's hesitation to kill Archangel led to her transformation into the Horseman of Death at his hands. Jean Grey of the Age of Apocalypse managed to revert this process, unlocking a previously untapped power in Betsy's mind, who became a full-fledged Omega-level telepath after these events. Betsy stabbed Archangel with the Life Seed, killing Warren and creating a new being in his likeness in the process.

After the Schism between the X-Men, while Betsy decided to stay on Utopia under Cyclops' leadership, she secretly remained part of X-Force to help whenever Wolverine requested. Cyclops also placed her in charge of a new X-Men Security team, asking her to be his spy and spy-hunter.

Soon after, Captain Britain learned of Betsy's activities with X-Force through their bond and decided to retrieve her to Otherworld, where Jamie Braddock was revealed to be alive, and punish Fantomex for his crimes. Betsy took up the Lady Briton mantle to rescue Fantomex and was ultimately forced to kill Jamie to prevent his future self from destroying the multiverse. X-Force faced a new Brotherhood of Mutants, of which the Shadow King was a member. Betsy imprisoned his psyche for good into Omega White, whose ability was to eat psychic energy. After this last mission, X-Force disbanded for good and Fantomex, who had been keeping a relationship with Betsy, but died at the hands of the Brotherhood, was resurrected in three different bodies for each of his brains.

As a member of Cyclops' Extinction Team, Betsy dealt with the fallout from Archangel's machinations in Tabula Rasa and sided with the X-Men against the Avengers once the Phoenix Force returned to Earth to reclaim a host. However, Daredevil made Betsy question her motives, and she joined the Avengers, the X-Men and Nova in the final battle against Cyclops.

=== Marvel NOW! ===
After the events of Avengers vs. X-Men, Betsy and Fantomex spent weeks in Paris, engaging in drinking, sex and thieving. While Betsy and Fantomex grew apart, she and Cluster – Fantomex' female self – grew closer and more devoted to each other, resulting in a romantic relationship. Feeling jealous about the new couple, Fantomex set Betsy up to be blamed for a crime. Once Cluster sided with him over Betsy, Betsy decided to leave them both for good.

Upon returning to New York, Betsy took a teaching position at the Jean Grey School for Higher Learning. Due to Betsy's constant assaulting of the students and aggressiveness, Wolverine was forced to fire her, and instead assigned her a mission to take down Spiral. With the help of Storm and Puck, Betsy faced her longtime rival and Bishop, who had returned to the present day. After taking a trip through Bishop's mind, Betsy managed to tame the Demon Bear in his psyche, making an unusual ally of it. She also rescued Fantomex from Weapon XIII at Cluster's request, but left them once more. Bishop's alliance with Betsy's group put them at war with Cassandra Nova – the Revenant Queen – who wished to unleash her revenants (or mummudrai) on Earth. Betsy ultimately stabbed her to death, breaking her vow not to kill again. Betsy's group also teamed up with Cable's X-Force to rescue Bishop and Hope Summers, both kidnapped by Stryfe. Betsy's posture in this mission impressed Cable.

As a member of the X-Men, Betsy joined an all-female squad led by Storm alongside Rogue, Kitty Pryde and Rachel Summers, and later Omega Sentinel and Monet, taking on villains such as Arkea, the Brotherhood from a future timeline, Lady Deathstrike's Sisterhood and The Future. During this time, Betsy started focusing her powers into different weapons of psychic energy such as a bow and arrow, a crossbow and a grappling line and a flail, mentored a small group of students consisted of Hellion, Anole, Broo, and Rockslide and kept a relationship with a virtual boyfriend created in the Danger Room.

=== All-New Marvel NOW! ===
In the wake of a terrorist attack known as the Alexandria Incident, which claimed 3,000 lives, Cable re-formed the mutant black ops team X-Force so that mutantkind not only had a continued place in the world, but also had a stake in it. While Cable recruited Fantomex, Marrow and Doctor Nemesis as his teammates, Betsy actually sought Cable because she couldn't bear staying away from X-Force as she admitted she was addicted to killing. Their first mission had the team track and face Volga, a wealthy business man responsible for the abduction and weaponization of several mutants and depowered mutants. As a member of X-Force, Braddock grew more bloodthirsty, self-loathing and broken by the day, admitting that resorting to killing was the only way she could feel anything at all. She also kept a sexual relationship with Cable. X-Force also faced Fantomex, who was driven to the point of insanity and received god-like powers. Betsy ultimately used her mind blade to scramble Fantomex's brain.

As a member of the X-Men, Betsy investigated the Shi'ar's Providian Order, while taking on Skrull/Brood hybrids, investigated a mysterious natural phenomena in the Blackrock Desert, helped Nightcrawler against a newly returned Shadow King, and joined the X-Men and Avengers in Genosha to fight the clone of Red Skull during the AXIS storyline. Months later, Betsy and the X-Men took refuge in the X-Nation under Cyclops' leadership, when Earth-616 suffered from an early death as a consequence of the multiversal phenomena known as the incursions.

=== All-New, All-Different Marvel ===
The intervention of Mister Fantastic in the rebirth of Earth-616 caused the Marvel Universe to be a direct continuation of the previous iteration. As part of the All-New, All-Different Marvel event, Betsy reappeared in a world where the Terrigen released in the atmosphere by the Inhumans proved to be deadly to mutants. For this reason, Magneto invited Betsy to be a partner in his endeavors and protect mutantkind. He also offered her the chance to work with a blank slate clone of Archangel he had come across earlier. Although not fully agreeing with Magneto's methods, Betsy remained part of his team, alongside Monet and Sabretooth, for the sake of rehabilitating Archangel, whom she kept under telepathic control. Magneto's X-Men first mission had them face the Dark Riders, who were targeting mutant healers. Following a lead buried in the dormant Archangel's mind, Betsy and Magneto travelled to Colorado, where they found a wingless Warren Worthington brainwashed by the son of Apocalypse, Genocide, and Clan Akkaba, who were harvesting his wings to create an army of Archangel clones. When Warren and Archangel merged, Betsy started working with him to restore the man she once knew and loved.

Once Ulysses, an Inhuman with the ability to forecast the future, emerged, Betsy briefly changed alliances, siding with Storm's X-Men in opposition to Magneto's team, who wanted to eliminate the boy. Betsy also found out Magneto had secretly employed Mystique and Fantomex and made an alliance with the Hellfire Club, much to her annoyance. After the X-Men foiled Someday Corporation's plans to weaponize mutants, Betsy quit the team, vowing to keep an eye on Magneto's operations and putting an end to them if he ever crossed the line. On her own, Betsy tracked down and defeated threats to mutantkind such as Omega Sentinels, Sauron and the Nasty Boys. Betsy also faced Mystique, stabilizing the shapeshifter's psyche once and for all.

When Beast discovered that the Terrigen was saturating and would soon render Earth completely uninhabitable for mutants, Betsy joined the rest of the X-Men in their war against the Inhumans, seeking to destroy the cloud while the Inhumans fought to protect it. After the war ended, Magneto's team of X-Men disbanded and Betsy learned that he was working alongside Emma Frost and knew about her deceptions that led to the war. Making good on her promise, Betsy found Magneto and killed him. She then walked away, feeling like the world and the X-Men were better off without her. When Captain America and Hydra took over the United States, Betsy and a few mutants relocated to the mutant sovereign republic of New Tian, under the leadership of Xorn, who was mind controlled by Emma Frost behind the scenes.

=== ResurrXion ===
While the X-Men rebuilt the Xavier Institute for Mutant Education and Outreach in the middle of Central Park, Betsy decided to return to England. After spending some time in London, Betsy found herself under an overwhelming psychic attack by the Shadow King, which caused her to lose control. Betsy called for help and Rogue, Bishop, Archangel, Gambit, Fantomex and Old Man Logan came to her rescue. She sent the X-Men to the Astral Plane to deal with Farouk and remained behind to maintain the necessary mental link back to the physical world. Betsy found out the Shadow King was keeping Charles Xavier's soul trapped in the Astral Plane, and under the Professor's guidance, she managed to fight Logan and Gambit, both possessed by the Shadow King, contain the psychic infection in London and protect the civilians. After Xavier killed the Shadow King, Betsy was shocked to learn he had taken over the body of Fantomex, who chose to remain in the Astral Plane.

Suspicious of X, as now Xavier started to call himself, Betsy travelled to the Astral Plane herself to make sure Fantomex wasn't fooled into giving up his body. Unbeknownst to the X-Men, X had unintentionally brought someone else with him, a newly resurrected Proteus. Not willing to take a risk with such a powerful being on the loose, the X-Men appointed Betsy as their leader over X and attacked Proteus, ultimately defeating him with a combined effort. However, when Betsy tapped into a psychic network to undo Proteus' reality-bending madness, the Shadow King took the chance to return to the physical world. Betsy and X joined forces to defeat him once more, linking every psychic telepathically and cleansing the world of Farouk's filth. X erased the memories of the other X-Men and told Betsy she would be the only one to remember he had returned.

As a member of the X-Men, Betsy also tutored the time-displaced Jean Grey in the art of creating psychic weaponry and investigated the Phoenix-related phenomenon that led to the resurrection of the adult Jean Grey. Betsy was also selected by Kitty Pryde to join a team with Storm, Rogue, Jubilee and Domino and hunt for a resurrected Wolverine, facing Viper and her Femme Fatales along the way.

During this encounter, Betsy was attacked by the psychic vampire, Sapphire Styx who absorbed her soul into herself. Once inside, Betsy discovered the psychic husks of all the victims Sapphire had claimed over the centuries, including a fragment of Wolverine's soul that she had been unable to purge from herself. Drawing on the strength of all the imprisoned souls, Betsy used her telepathy to destroy Sapphire from within, and emerged in her original body. She later explained to Jubilee that after Sapphire was destroyed, she was able to use the soul energy she left behind to re-create her original body. It was also shown that Kwannon has apparently returned to life in her original body as well, as the new Psylocke.

=== Disassembled and Age of X-Man ===
Betsy Braddock as Captain Britain on the cover of Excalibur (vol. 4) #10 (June 2020). Art by Mahmud Asrar and Matthew Wilson.

Immediately after reclaiming her original body and legal identity as Elizabeth "Betsy" Braddock, Betsy returned to the Xavier Institute, where Jean Grey helped her cope with such a major change. Betsy also traveled to England and reunited with Brian and Meggan and met her niece, Maggie. The following days saw the X-Men responding to unexplained natural phenomena across the globe. The X-Men soon found out Nate Grey was responsible for these disasters in a desperate attempt to enact world peace and remake the world as he saw fit with the help of his Horsemen of Salvation, which included Angel. Betsy engaged Angel head-on and used a massive psychic strike to free Warren from Nate Grey's control, which unintentionally released his Archangel persona. Warren and Betsy had a falling-out, and he blamed her for unleashing the darkness within him. The X-Men responded with force, but were quickly overpowered and subdued. Betsy broke Nate Grey's control over Storm and soon joined forces with Jean Grey and other psychics to defeat X-Man once and for all, but the X-Men were all seemingly killed.

Gone from the Prime Marvel Universe, the X-Men were taken to a plane of existence created by X-Man with false memories, where everyone was a mutant and close relationships and love were forbidden. In this world, Betsy acted as a law enforcer for Department X alongside Iceman, Jubilee, Northstar, and Blob, with whom she developed a special friendship. As the Age of X-Man crumbled down, Betsy returned to Earth-616, where she joined Cyclops and his X-Men to end the threat of Colonel Callahan once and for all.

=== Dawn of X and return as Captain Britain ===
In the following six months, Professor X established the island-nation of Krakoa, welcoming mutants from all over the world and creating the first mutant society. Betsy had returned to her ancestral home in England, now known as Braddock Academy, but ultimately decided to move to Krakoa as well, only to find that her elder brother, Jamie Braddock, had been resurrected. Apocalypse also enlisted Betsy and Brian to investigate a strange, magically sealed Krakoan gate that opened from the Otherworld to the mutant-island. Morgan Le Fay, acting as Queen Regent of Otherworld and enraged about mutantkind's reach on her realm, cursed Brian to become her dark champion. In a desperate attempt to save his sister, Brian gave Betsy his Amulet of Right, the source of his powers. As a result, Betsy once again became Captain Britain, a hero of legend. Betsy was then chosen as one of the ten warriors who fight for Krakoa during the X of Swords tournament. She was defeated in the first round by Isca the Unbeaten and shattered like glass.

It was revealed that this had been a plan of Saturnyne who cast a spell intending to restore Brian Braddock as Captain Britain, but instead shattered Betsy across the multiverse. Multiple alternate versions of Betsy, the Captain Britain Corps, appeared to help fight Amenth. Her spirit later became displaced across realities, even switching with a Queen Elizabeth III variant, before being restored with the help of Excalibur and Psylocke. After her resurrection, it was revealed her body had been possessed by Malice, whom Betsy and Psylocke later confronted and redeemed.

At the Hellfire Gala, Britain—under Coven Akkaba's influence—rejected Krakoan sovereignty and Betsy's legitimacy. The Braddock Lighthouse became Braddock Isle, independent of Britain. In Otherworld, Merlyn stirred anti-mutant sentiment to undermine Saturnyne. Betsy briefly lost her Captain Britain powers but defeated King Arthur in combat. Ultimately, she executed Merlyn and declared independence from both Saturnyne and Roma, redefining Captain Britain as a multiversal champion no longer bound to the Starlight Citadel.

=== Knights of X and X-Corps Unlimited ===
Roma later tasked Betsy with assembling ten knights, forming the Knights of X to find the Siege Perilous. After Gambit died in battle against Merlyn, Betsy accessed Mercator (revealed to be the Siege itself), faced her insecurities, resurrected Gambit, and restored the link between Krakoa and Otherworld. Rachel Summers supported her psychically, and the two began a romantic relationship.

Morgan Le Fay then manipulated Britain and unleashed the Furies against the Captain Britain Corps, attempting to replace Betsy with a controllable version. With help from allies including Tony Stark, Betsy stopped Morgan by mystically binding her to Britain, ending the threat.

When Orchis massacred mutants at the Hellfire Gala and framed mutantkind, Betsy attempted diplomacy with Britain but was met with hostility. After British authorities attacked mutants, she renounced the United Kingdom. Working with X-Corps, she battled the Externals and Selene, who briefly ascended to godhood before being defeated. After Orchis fell, Betsy returned to Rachel's side and continued leading the Captain Britain Corps in defense of the Multiverse.

=== From The Ashes ===
After the fall of Krakoa and Orchis' defeat, Betsy Braddock returned to Braddock Manor in Essex with Rachel Summers. Seeking peace, the two focused on each other. However, Rachel struggled with psychic instability following her resurrection. To help, Betsy secretly shared the burden of containing Rachel's excess energy and created a private mindscape modeled after the Braddock Lighthouse for them to retreat to.

Their quiet life ended when Forge invited them to join his new proactive strike team, guided by a predictive system called the Analog. Though wary of its secrecy, Betsy joined at Rachel's urging as the team—dubbed X-Force—began stopping emerging threats. Their early missions included containing a devastating organic weapon in Japan and surviving a mystical transformation in Wakanda that turned them into medieval versions of themselves before Forge and Sage restored them.

In Cambodia, Betsy and Rachel psychically confronted Nuklo and uncovered the cause of his mental regression but were overwhelmed. Investigating further, X-Force entered the Temple of the Dragon's Breath and the Well of All Things, leading Betsy to open a portal to Otherworld. In the Everglades, they battled dimensional rifts alongside Man-Thing. Later in Quebec, while stopping Nuklo from opening a nexus, teammate Surge sacrificed herself to seal the rift, deepening tensions within the team.

While recovering in their private mindscape, the alchemist La Diabla invaded and trapped Rachel. Betsy fought her in a psychic duel and, with Forge's help, expelled her. The conflict escalated in South America, where Betsy shielded her team and destroyed La Diabla's Elementals of Doom. The battle led to Subterranea, where La Diabla was revealed to be working for Moses Magnum, architect of the fracture nodes. With the Starlight Sword, Betsy cut through La Diabla's alchemy and helped stop Magnum's plan to unleash monsters on Earth.

Disillusioned by Forge's manipulative secrecy, Betsy left as X-Force disbanded.

=== Psylocke: Ninja ===
A new series about Betsy once again as Psylocke, Psylocke: Ninja – Rise from the Fall (originally known simply as Psylocke: Ninja), was published in 2025.

== Powers and abilities ==
The Exiles version of Elizabeth "Betsy" Braddock manifesting her "psychic katana", on the cover of X-Men: Sword of the Braddocks #1: "The Face of Fear" (art by Alex Garner)

=== Early powers ===
In her earliest appearances in Uncanny X-Men, Betsy possessed the power of telepathy. She could read and project thoughts over long distances; control minds; manipulate people's minds and possess them; subdue and tap into other's powers; affect people's memories; project mental illusions; and generate psi-bolts that could stun, injure, or kill others. She could also project her astral self, and the astral bodies of other people, into the astral or physical plane. She could scan entire towns with her mind, and leaf through the psyches of the inhabitants of a city to learn of their condition or intentions. She was powerful enough to telepathically "shout" to her teammates in Australia while she was in Washington, D.C. without the aid of any type of power-enhancing machinery such as Cerebro. She could also probe individuals to check up on their status.

When using her telepathic powers, a butterfly-shaped energy aura would appear around her face. It was never truly made clear in the comic books by the writers whether this was something that could be perceived by others or if this was simply an "effect" to show when Betsy was using her powers to the reading audience (although it was implied that it could be). This "butterfly" (sometimes depicted as having eyes in its wings) was also the form Betsy usually took when manifesting her astral form, both on the astral plane, and in the physical world, although she occasionally used an illusory image of her physical body. After her transformation, Betsy's psi-form changed accordingly.

In addition, Betsy could also use her telepathy to project a focused beam of directed psionic energy called a "psycho-blast" that could incapacitate or kill a living being instantly. This attack was powerful enough to pierce the Juggernaut's psi-proof helmet. The psycho-blast was able to affect inorganic material as well as living targets (when directing a psycho-blast at Sabretooth the energy destroyed the metal Cerebro helmet she was wearing). Betsy also possessed limited precognitive powers that occasionally allowed her to envision probable future events, or to see quick flashes of the immediate future. These visions were random and infrequent, however, and she had no control over them.

While in her original body, Betsy was given bionic eyes by Mojo and Spiral which instantly adjusted to any intensity of light, preventing her from being blinded by brightness. The bionic eyes were also cameras, transmitting to Mojo everything that Betsy saw. For a time, Betsy took the role of Captain Britain from her brother, using the deceased Kaptain Briton's costume which had been modified by the Mastermind computer. This costume gave her superhuman strength and the ability to fly, and restoring her sight after she was briefly rendered temporarily blind.

=== New powers ===
After her physical transformation into a Japanese ninja assassin, she gained highly developed fighting skills in addition to her telepathy, which at this stage was not as powerful as it had been before her transformation, as half of her psionic potential still resided with Revanche in her original body. After Revanche's death, Betsy's telepathy was restored to its previous strength. The most common usage of her powers was the manifestation of a "psychic knife", which operated in the same manner as her "psycho-blast" ability, but at close range. Described as the focused totality of her psychic powers, she often used it to disrupt the minds and nervous systems of her foes by driving the glowing "blade" of psionic energy into their heads. At least once, she utilized two psychic knives simultaneously. During this time she chose to fight up-close most of the time, using her new martial arts skills, although she could still utilize distanced telepathic assaults. At least once, she experienced a precognitive flash while in her new body.

After her exposure to the Crimson Dawn, she also gained the ability to teleport herself and others using areas of shadow as gateways. The teleportation could cover huge distances; on one occasion she transported the X-Men from America to Africa in a few seconds. She could also teleport through the shadows of other dimensions. Betsy has not been seen using this ability since her imprisonment of the Shadow King in the astral plane; during a mission against Stryfe, she mentioned to Nightcrawler that she no longer possessed this ability.

=== Telekinetic powers ===
To keep the Shadow King imprisoned in the Astral Plane, Betsy sacrificed the use of her telepathy, but at some point gained Phoenix's telekinesis instead. At first, due to the relative newness of her telekinesis, she could not exercise fine control over her powers. She could blast an enemy through a brick wall, but could not levitate small objects, like a dime, from the floor. As time progressed, Betsy grew more proficient at using her powers and she could use her telekinesis to reshape a pistol into smaller metal projectiles.

Instead of her psychic knife, Betsy began to manifest a telekinetic katana composed of raw psionic energy. At its lowest intensity her katana functions much like her psychic knife once did, short-circuiting the victim's nervous system on impact. At its highest level, the katana can slice through almost any physical matter. Betsy's control over the katana is such that she can slice an armored opponent and cut through the armor, but only leave her opponent stunned or unconscious. Betsy's telekinetic manifestations produce visible radiance in the physical world, and so she can use her psychic katana as a makeshift light source in areas of darkness. The katana can also affect beings that are more powerful than Betsy herself. She can also use her sword to shatter telepathic power-inhibitors imposed on others, despite her own lack of telepathy. With no telepathy to guide her when performing this task, she must rely on her instincts to give the blade the sufficient strength necessary to break the inhibitors, without doing permanent damage to the subject in question. During the timeline shift known as House of M, Betsy showed the ability to summon two telekinetic katanas at the same time. It is unknown if she is capable of this under normal circumstances.

Aside from the blade, Betsy can use her telekinesis to enhance her speed, strength, and fighting skills to superhuman levels. She can also levitate herself and others, or manipulate matter on a molecular level. She can also create telekinetic shields of various sizes and strength, and her telekinesis has been said to be strong enough to shatter mountains. After her resurrection, Betsy's telekinetic powers have been greatly enhanced. At the time of Betsy's resurrection, Marvel Girl claimed that Betsy's telekinesis was on a level even she could not match.

After her resurrection, Betsy was shown to be immune to all forms of psionic manipulations such as mind-reading, mind-control or mental attacks, and attempts of telepathic communication. This is a result of her brother Jamie's manipulation of the quantum strings that comprise her body. She is also immune or at least highly resistant to other psionic-based powers like the Savage Land Mutate Vertigo's disorientation power, or Nocturne's mind possessing abilities. Due to Jamie's alterations, Betsy is also immune to any physical and mental alteration by beings who can radically restructure reality, such as Proteus. She can, however, still be killed in more traditional manners, such as being stabbed or shot. She is also at least partially resistant to magical manipulation. Somehow these various immunities also affect her detectability from higher order technological equipment. For example, all sensor-arrays of the Exiles Crystal Palace are not able to detect her—as if she does not even exist. Beside this immunity, she is able to use her telekinesis to modify her own molecular structure to render herself invisible to at least the naked eye.

However, Betsy's telekinetic powers seems to evolve with the return of her telepathy since her encounter with the Sisterhood as, at first, she has rarely been seen using her telekinesis to levitate objects or create her trademark telekinetic katana. It appears also, that she is focusing more on developing her returned telepathic powers and that the various immunities that were granted to her by her resurrection at the hands of her brother seem to have vanished or at least greatly diminished, as during the Necrosha event Proteus was not only able to possess Betsy but also was able to alter her body structure. During the "Second Coming" storyline, Betsy has once more been depicted using her telekinesis for considerable feats: such as making a shield to protect herself and X-23 from bullets, ripping a Nimrod robot in two and even achieving what appears to be a form of flight or levitation.

=== Returned powers and abilities ===
The events involving the Sisterhood of Mutants triggered a return of her original telepathic abilities. Upon rejoining the X-Men, Betsy states that while she is still primarily a telekinetic, she has gained the mental ability to telepathically "suggest what people see" (i.e. cast telepathic illusions). In an interview, writer Christopher Yost and editor Daniel Ketchum confirmed that Betsy Braddock now possesses both telekinesis and telepathy. Additionally, she is once again able to focus her telepathic energies into a solid psychic knife and can still manifest her telekinetic katana.

As shown in the events of the Psylocke miniseries, she still appears to be an unusually strong and powerful telepath, with a range of abilities similar to what she possessed at her introduction, as well as manifesting her trademark psychic knife. Betsy is also shown to have levels of telekinesis sufficient to increase the strength and power of her physical blows as well as ward off attacks via force fields and telekinetic "blasts or bursts". During the Utopia storyline, she was seen manifesting her telekinetic katana, but of late she has been seen using a pair of traditional katanas as well. After the events of "Second Coming", Betsy establishes that her psychic abilities fluctuate in strength; if her concentration is divided as a result of a telepathic response to her environment, it has an adverse effect on her telekinesis.

During the "Dark Angel Saga", Betsy's full psionic potential was unlocked by Jean Grey from the Age of Apocalypse timeline. She was able to overcome Archangel with her newly strengthened and increased telepathy – a feat that had previously been beyond her power. Writer Rick Remender has stated that she is now an Omega-class/level mutant and telepath on par with Jean Grey and Charles Xavier.

=== Otherworlder and Captain Britain powers ===
As a half-Otherworlder, Betsy Braddock is a vessel for magic, and has the potential to manifest additional abilities uncommon to normal humans due to her unique origin. When wearing the Captain Britain uniform, her natural abilities are enhanced, and since donning the mantle again, she has been able to detect a type of transformative magic and its power level, demonstrate resistance to the control of other magic, albeit briefly, and create a circle of magical protection to shield her team from La Diabla's alchemy. The natural capabilities of the Captain Britain mantle include superhuman strength, durability, speed, stamina, agility, reflexes, and senses, as well as the ability to fly and teleport to Otherworld. In addition to her natural magical abilities, Betsy's Sword of Starlight possesses numerous unexplored magical properties.

=== Fighting skills ===
Elizabeth "Betsy" Braddock has been classified as a master martial artist, though the specific fighting arts she has mastered have never been revealed. Psylocke's fighting skills and techniques have been shown to surpass those of the average Hand ninja, or Crimson Dawn Undercloak, and have been said to rival those of a ninja master. In addition to the fighting skills she learned from The Hand, Betsy has recently received training from fellow Exiles teammate Sabretooth and from an alternate reality's Ogun, who used science and magic combined to alter the passage of time itself, allowing them to accomplish a lifetime's work in a few short hours, thus improving Betsy's skills once more.

As a telepath, Betsy could take advantage of her powers in a fight by reading her opponents' movements seconds before they made them, giving her the opportunity to counter-attack faster. She could also use her telepathy to mask her presence from other people, humans and superhumans alike, e.g. from Wolverine's super-enhanced senses or from Jean Grey's telepathy. She could also create telepathic illusions to distract her enemies while fighting them, and as a ninja, she can use her psychic knife to incapacitate her opponents instead of killing them; although she will kill her opponents if she finds it to be necessary.

As a telekinetic, she often uses her powers to augment her strength and speed, making her fighting skills strong enough to match, and even outmatch other superhumanly strong opponents, like a holographic version of Sabretooth in the Danger Room. During a training session with Rogue and Thunderbird, Betsy was able to match Rogue's attacks despite the fact that Rogue had greatly enhanced speed and strength at the time.

=== Armor ===
During the time when the X-Men were based in the Australian outback, Betsy Braddock gained possession of a unique suit of armor. Made of an unknown metal, it was lightweight and form-fitting, yet extremely resistant to physical damage, giving Betsy an added protection to her physical body. The armor was also resistant to projectiles and energy weapons. Wolverine had the armor custom-ordered through a weapons and technology firm named Landau, Luckman, and Lake for "a colleague". Mr. Chang, an agent of Landau, Luckman, and Lake, loaned the armor to Lindsay McCabe since Wolverine had sent her to him. Tyger Tiger also wore the body armor for a short time, and she was briefly trapped in the armor due to a built-in security mechanism, which Wolverine managed to free her from. After traveling through the Siege Perilous and trading bodies with Kwannon, Betsy no longer used the body armor. When Kwannon, in Betsy's original body, returned to Xavier's mansion, she was wearing an armor that was similar to the one Betsy used to wear, but it has never been officially stated whether or not this armor had the same capabilities as Betsy's original one. The same can be said for the armor worn by Betsy's resurrected original body, after it was brought back by Madelyne's sisterhood, wearing armor of the same coloring.

== Relationships ==
Elizabeth "Betsy" Braddock has been involved in a series of romantic relationships during the years. As a member of S.T.R.I.K.E.'s Psi Division, she was involved with fellow agent Tom Lennox. He was murdered while trying to defend her, during which time she was telepathically linked to him. Telepathically experiencing Lennox's death left Betsy traumatized for a time.

After returning to the X-Men in Kwannon's body, Betsy telepathically manipulated Cyclops, her team leader, into being romantically attracted to her. After regaining her full personality from Kwannon, Betsy offered a belated apology to Jean Grey, admitting that the flirtation was due to the presence of Kwannon's lingering personality traits in her mind, but that she did in fact find Cyclops attractive. Later, Betsy and Archangel had a romantic relationship, but chose to end it after realizing that the differences between them were too great. After Betsy's death, Archangel felt anguish from being unable to save her, but eventually made peace with it and moved on to a relationship with Paige Guthrie.

Betsy and the X-Man Neal Shaara were romantically involved until her death. After joining the Exiles, Betsy has been flirting with teammate Sabretooth. They passionately kissed each other, eventually leading to both acting on their romantic feelings more intimately. Some time later, Betsy and Archangel have been seen to be in the process of rebuilding their romantic relationship. Betsy later had a brief romantic and sexual relationship with both Fantomex and his female counterpart Cluster, after Fantomex was separated into three people.

Betsy was confirmed to be in a romantic relationship with Rachel Summers during their quest for the Siege Perilous in Otherworld.

== Other versions ==
In addition to her mainstream incarnation (known as the Earth-616 Elizabeth "Betsy" Braddock), the character has had been depicted in the comics set in many other fictional universes and timelines of the Marvel Multiverse, including Age of Apocalypse, Days of Future Past, Earth X, House of M, Marvel Comics 2, Ultimate X-Men, and Age of X. These alternative representations usually differ considerably from the details and events of the main story, without affecting that story's narrative continuity.

=== Age of Apocalypse ===
The "Age of Apocalypse" (Earth-295) incarnation of Betsy Braddock is an Asian ninja with the ability to generate psychic blades. She uses her psychic blades to counteract the brainwashing of Jean Grey and Kirika. At the end of the series, Braddock, Sunfire, Kirika, and Silver Samurai depart for Clan Yashida's refugee colony in New Japan.

=== Age of X ===
In Age of X (Earth-11326) storyline of X-Men: Legacy, Betsy Braddock never swapped bodies with Kwannon and is a member of the Force Warriors, a select group of telekinetics who guard Fortress X. Braddock is in a relationship with the Age of X version of Iceman.

=== Days of Future Past ===
In the "Days of Future Past" timeline (Earth-811), Betsy Braddock is the Red Queen and one of the Lords Cardinal of the Hellfire Club.

In Excalibur, the Earth-9620 Betsy Braddock is a member of the underground resistance against Black Air, the security service that rules Britain.

=== Exiles ===
Several versions of the character appear in the Exiles comics:

- Earth-1081: This Betsy Braddock, created by Judd Winick and Mike McKone, is a member of the X-Men and appears to be identical to the one from Earth-616.
- Earth-2182: A minor character who is an X-Men affiliate with all-blue colored costume, hair and powers, created by Jim Calafiore.
- Earth-7794: A minor character who was murdered by Slaymaster; created by Chris Claremont and Paul Pelletie.
- Earth-51489: A barbarian female warrior killed by Slaymaster; created by Chris Claremont and Paco Diaz Luque.
- Earth-72911: Created by Chris Claremont, she was another Betsy Braddock murdered by Slaymaster.
- Earth-80827: Created by Chris Claremont and Tom Grummett, this version of Betsy Braddock was a Japanese woman affiliated with Ogun and known as Lady Mandarin, who was also killed by Slaymaster when they fought.
- Earth-80911: Married to Victor Creed and murdered by Slaymaster along with her husband and children; created by Chris Claremont and Paco Diaz Luque.
- Earth-89145: In this reality, Braddock was a British pilot, who was murdered by Slaymaster as part of his attempt to kill every version of Betsy Braddock throughout the Multiverse; created by Chris Claremont and Paco Diaz Luque.

=== Earth X ===
The Betsy Braddock version of the Earth-X future timeline (Earth-9997) was brought to Otherworld to hone her powers under Merlyn and Roma's tutelage. Her telepathic signature is left constantly active, bathing her head in bright pink light.

=== "House of M" ===
In the alternate reality of the 2005 "House of M" storyline (Earth-58163) created by the Scarlet Witch, Betsy Braddock is a Princess Royal named Elizabeth Glorianna Braddock, sister to the monarch of Britain. In reality, Braddock is the rightful heir of the throne, being a few minutes older than her twin brother Brian, but steps down in his favor, as she prefers adventuring with her lady-in-waiting, Rachel Summers.

=== Millennial Visions ===
Several versions of the character appear in the X-Men: Millennial Visions comics:

- Earth-1003: Created by John Paul Leon, Betsy Braddock is affiliated with the X-Men and a member of Professor's Secret Service. She, Magneto and Quicksilver are all murdered at a peace summit.
- Earth-1011: Created by Sean Chen, Betsy Braddock is an evil cyborg affiliated with the X-Sentinels.
- Earth-1017: Created by Pablo Raimondi, Betsy Braddock (Code X 11095) is an Asian ninja affiliated with the X-Men, with short spiky hair and a different red tattoo over her left eye.
- Earth-3933: Betsy Braddock was bitten by a monster which ate her family in their sleep, and is empowered with superhuman strength and makes her virtually immortal, though she now hungers for human flesh.

=== Ultimate Marvel ===
In Ultimate X-Men (Earth-1610), Betsy Braddock is initially a colonel for the British Secret Intelligence Service along with Dai Thomas. After Braddock is killed by Colossus, her consciousness survives and moves to the comatose body of Kwannon. Kwannon willingly surrenders control of her body to Braddock before moving to the afterlife. Braddock retains her telepathic powers in Kwannon's body and gains the new ability to create a blade that can cut through most materials, even a Sentinel. Braddock goes on to join the X-Men as Psylocke after she is rejected from S.T.R.I.K.E. due to being a minor.

=== Uncanny X-Force ===
Several versions of the character appear in the Uncanny X-Force comics:

- Earth-11045: In this reality, all superhumans were converted into the cyborg Deathlok, serving as a global police force. Betsy Braddock was among them and was sent to the past together with the rest of X-Force to secure a high-tech, self-contained research facility known as The World and kill X-Force of the past.
- The Earth-12928 version of Elizabeth Braddock, an elderly woman known as Magistrate Braddock, was created by Rick Remender and Julian Totino Tedesco. In this reality, Evan Sabah Nur ascended and became Apocalypse, the greatest threat the Earth had ever faced, which forced Wolverine to create an X-Force composed of various heroes. Together, they managed to defeat Evan and save the world. To prevent someone like Evan from threatening the Earth again, X-Force were elected as the new rulers of Earth. Elizabeth, in her Asian body, became the leader of X-Force and the world.

=== What If ===
Several versions of the character appear in the What If comics:

- Earth-957: Appears to be basically the same as the Earth-616 ninja Betsy Braddock in Kwannon's body; created by Tom DeFalco and Leo Fernandez.
- Earth-983: Created by Stefan Petrucha and Greg Luzniak, this version of Betsy Braddock is very similar to the Earth-616 ninja Betsy Braddock in Kwannon's body, but with a modified costume.
- Earth-34922: When the X-Men were attacked by Sentinels, Betsy Braddock (postbody swap), along with the other members, reluctantly attempts to wake up Wolverine to battle them.
- Earth-77995: Created by Benny Powell and Warren Ellis, this Betsy Braddock is an evil version the Earth-616 ninja Betsy Braddock from X-Men: Legacy. Three months after the deaths of Charles Xavier and Apocalypse, Betsy Braddock joined the Followers of Apocalypse after they were nearly destroyed by Phoenix.
- Earth-89721: An armored and cloaked version of Elizabeth Braddock in her original body, created by Roy Thomas and Ron Wilson. Due to the Evolutionary Bomb she is now able to read the thoughts of everybody around her.
- Earth-95169: This Elizabeth Braddock appears to share her body, power and costume with the Earth-616 X-Men: Legacy version.
- Earth-98193: Captain Britain is briefly seen in an interview with Vulcan as a member of the X-Men. This version of Elizabeth Braddock appears to still be in her blonde, British body.

Betsy Braddock of Earth-21993 was created by Kurt Busiek and Tod Smith. Her history mirrors that of her Earth-616 counterpart until just after she crossed through the Siege Perilous. After Charles Xavier escaped Skrull activity and returned to Earth, she is among the many teams of X-Men gathered by Xavier, who express his disapproval with the state they had left human/mutant affairs in his absence. This meeting erupts into violence due to an argument between Cable and Xavier over what direction to take. Betsy joins the other X-Men in attempting to incapacitate Cable and the New Mutants, but the New Mutants flee. Following Cable's assassination of Xavier, Betsy joins a group of X-Men led by Wolverine in tracking the New Mutants down to their new headquarters, where, as she battle the remaining New Mutants, Wolverine kills Cable. Wolverine then leads his team of X-Men on a mission to slay all their enemies. After killing Mister Sinister and the Nasty Boys, Betsy has enough with the mindless killings and defects over to another team of X-Men led by Storm. By this point, the U.S. government unleashed the Sentinels in response to Magneto taking over Washington. Betsy comes across Storm just as most of the X-Men on her side either defected over to Magneto, or found themselves killed or captured by the Sentinels. Realizing that current events might lead up to the nightmare future (Earth-811) where mutants have been either enslaved or wiped out by the Sentinels, Storm and Betsy seek to try and talk Magneto into stopping his aggressions. Breaking into the United States Capitol, Betsy and Storm attempt to warn Magneto of the possible apocalyptic future ahead of them, but he scoffs at the idea and attempts to destroy another attacking squad of Sentinels. Mentally detecting that one of them carried a nuclear warhead, Betsy attempts to warn Magneto, but she is too late. The bomb goes off, killing them all.

=== Other versions ===
- Earth-161 (X-Men Forever): Elizabeth "Betsy" Braddock in an Asian body, based on Chris Claremont's original story where she was transformed by Spiral to look Asian, but was not bodyswapped with anyone. created by Chris Claremont and Paul Smith.
- Earth-597 (Marvel Graphic Novel): In this universe, where the Nazis won World War II, an evil Elizabeth Braddock, created by Michael Higgins, Tom Morgan and Justin Thyme, is a Nazi agent affiliated with the Reichsmen.
- Earth-2107: Created by Robert Kirkman and Yanick Paquette, Elizabeth "Psylocke" Braddock was Bishop's wife in the future Ultimate universe, seen during a flashback when she got killed.
- Earth-2301 (Marvel Mangaverse): Created by C. B. Cebulski and Jeff Matsuda, this version of Betsy Braddock appears to be of Indian ethnicity and has the ability to project numerous green telepathic gremlins by gesturing with her arms. They are able to pass through solid matter and cause severe physical pain to those they struck, but if interrupted, Betsy herself seems to experience severe headaches.
- Earth-2319 (New Avengers vol. 3): Created by Jonathan Hickman and Simone Bianchi, this Elizabeth "Beth" Braddock is, like her brother Brian, using the identity Captain Britain. They are both members of the Illuminati and are killed by Mapmakers during an incursion.
- Earth-9921 (Gambit): Created by Fabian Nicieza and Yanick Paquette, this Betsy Braddock is an X-Men affiliate similar in appearance to the Earth-616 Asian Betsy Braddock but with a different costume.
- Earth-8101 (Marvel Apes): A simian version of Betsy Braddock.
- Earth-11080 (Marvel Universe Vs Wolverine): Jonathan Maberry, Goran Parlov During a mission with Wolverine, Betsy Braddock was attacked by Angel, who had developed the same cannibalistic hunger as Spider-Man did earlier. All he left behind was her right arm, but using his tracking skills, Wolverine soon found her remains. After samples of Betsy Braddock's DNA were studied, Wolverine tracked down Angel and killed him.
- Earth-41001 (X-Men: The End): The only apparent difference between this version and the ninja Betsy Braddock of Earth-616 is a different costume; created by Chris Claremont and Sean Chen.
- Earth-70105 (Bullet Points): Betsy Braddock lived virtually the same life as she did on Earth-616, and helped defend the Earth from Galactus.
- Earth-95126 (Punisher Kills the Marvel Universe): An Asian version, killed by the Punisher along with every other mutant.
- Earth-807128 (Wolverine/Dark Reign): Betsy Braddock was one of the X-Men Logan was tricked into murdering by Mysterio when the villains got organized and attacked the heroes at once.
- Uncanny X-Men: A male version of Betsy Braddock, ge is a muscular Asian male in a similar costume and powers as the Earth-616 Betsy Braddock.
- 5 Ronin: Created by Peter Milligan and David Aja. In 17th-century Japan, O-Chiyo Braddock is the half-Japanese orphan daughter of a local Japanese woman (who died when she was a baby) and an English expat trader (who committed suicide when she was a child after his business failed), who is forced into the yoshiwara to survive and grows up to become the top-ranked prostitute (codenamed "Butterfly") in a high-end brothel. She crosses paths with this Earth's version of Wolverine (who is also reimagined as a 17th-Century Japanese samurai, along with Punisher, Deadpool, and Hulk), who becomes her regular customer.
- Astonishing X-Men: Created by Tommy Lee Edwards, this Betsy Braddock is a young Asian ninja character affiliated with the evil Mutant Monarchy. She has a shorter hair and is apparently younger, and fights blindfolded with twin daggers.
- Age of X-Man: Created by Zac Thompson and Lonnie Nadler, this Betsy Braddock is a clerk for Department X, maintaining community relations and standards.

== Collections ==
Title	Material collected	Publication date	ISBN
Psylocke & Archangel: Crimson Dawn	Crimson Dawn #1–4	July 20, 2016	ISBN 978-1-3029-0070-0
X-Men: Psylocke – Kill Matsu'o	Psylocke #1–4 and Uncanny X-Men (1963) #256–258	June 8, 2010	978-0-7851-4439-7
Excalibur by Tini Howard – Vol. 1	Excalibur (vol. 4) #1–6	April 22, 2020	978-1-3029-1991-7
Excalibur by Tini Howard – Vol. 2	Excalibur (vol. 4) #7–12	December 1, 2020	978-1-3029-2146-0
Excalibur by Tini Howard – Vol. 3	Excalibur (vol. 4) #16–21	September 15, 2021	978-1-3029-2484-3
Excalibur by Tini Howard – Vol. 4	Excalibur (vol. 4) #22–26	March 1, 2022	978-1-3029-2790-5
Betsy Braddock: Captain Britain	Betsy Braddock: Captain Britain #1–5	January 1, 2024	978-1-3029-5075-0
Psylocke: Ninja – Rise from the Fall	Psylocke: Ninja #1–5	October 20, 2026	978-1-3029-6872-4

== In other media ==
Betsy Braddock has made many appearances in media other than comic books as both Captain Britain and Psylocke. These include television series, films, and numerous video game adaptations and crossover titles. Betsy has been voiced by Grey DeLisle, Heather Doerksen, and Tasha Simm in animated series, and by Laura Bailey, Kimberly Brooks, Catherine Disher, Melissa Disney, Kim Mai Guest, Erica Lindbeck, Junk Luk, Masasa Moyo, and April Stewart in video games. In the film series, she was portrayed by Meiling Melançon and Olivia Munn.

== In merchandise ==
Several statuettes of Betsy Braddock as Psylocke were produced by various manufacturers, including by Bandai in 2005, Hasbro in 2008 (Marvel Super Hero Squad Wave 7), Kotobukiya in 2010 (redesigned in the Japanese bishōjo style by Shunya Yamashita) and 2011, Bowen Designs in 2010, and Sideshow Collectibles in 2010 and 2011. A diorama of Psylocke and Spiral was also created by Sideshow Collectibles in 2009.

Mini-bust statuettes of Psylocke were made by Bowen Designs in 2005, and by Diamond Select Toys, which also released several regular statuettes. Psylocke figures were also released as part of The Classic Marvel Figurine Collection by Eaglemoss Publications and the HeroClix collectible miniature game by NECA (Experienced – Giant-Size X-Men, Veteran – Armor Wars and Veteran – Xplosion.

Three Betsy Braddock "Psylocke" action figures were produced by Toy Biz in 1996, including one as part of the Marvel Legends line which was later picked up by Hasbro. Two other action figures were released by Hasbro, one as part of the Marvel Universe toyline in 2011. Diamond Select Toys released three different Betsy Braddock "Psylocke" Minimates between 2009 and 2011, in the series Wave 7, Wave 28, and the Uncanny X-Force Box Set.

== Reception ==
The character has achieved significant critical praise and popularity following the 1989 redesign. According to UGO, "Basically, Marvel gave a third-rate character a makeover, hence, creating one of the most popular female mutants in X-Men history."

Betsy Braddock was included in IGN's "Battle of the Comic-Book Babes" contest in 2005, winning the first two rounds against Aspen Matthews and then Natsumi and Miyuki, before losing to Emma Frost (the eventual champion of this edition). Betsy, however, emerged victorious from the following year's "Battle of the Comic-Book Babes" in 2006, winning the consecutive rounds against Deena Pilgrim, Rachel Summers and Black Cat. In the final round, she managed to get almost two-thirds of the votes (64%) when pitted against video gaming's female icon Lara Croft. In 2006, IGN also rated Betsy Braddock as the 22nd top X-Men character, comparing her to Rogue" and calling her "a born leader" whose "abilities make her one of the most potent fighters to ever wear the X", and also placed her third on their list of top 'X-Babes' for her being an "Asian gal with incredible body and a British accent". Marvel themselves declared her their own second most favorite hero of 2011, citing her "tremendous and thankless heroism". That same year, UGO ranked her ninth of their list of "superhero power upgrades that kicked complete ass" and also featured her among 25 "hot ninja girls" and called her an "eye candy that's less lollipop and more atomic warhead".

In 2011, IGN included Betsy Braddock among the eight mutants IGN wished to see in the sequel to X-Men: First Class, stating that "mentally, she can go toe-to-toe with fellow telepaths like Emma Frost, and physically, she can kick as much ass as Wolverine when the situation calls for it", and adding that they would prefer to see her appearing as an Asian and a ninja, while disregarding her prior appearances in X2 and X-Men: The Last Stand. Days of Future Past writer and producer Simon Kinberg said Betsy Braddock is a favourite of his, and said the director and producer Bryan Singer "thinks she's a neat character so there's certainly a chance she'll be in an X-Men movie some day". In 2015, Olivia Munn was cast as Betsy Braddock / Psylocke in Singer's X-Men: Apocalypse, which was released the following year.

Some of the praise was directed especially for her many video game roles, including in a series of 2D fighting games by Capcom wherein she was noted as a particularly well animated character. In 1996, MAXIMUM reported Betsy Braddock as being possibly the most popular X-Men character in Japan, where Capcom games have introduced the franchise to general public, "due to her Japanese appearance...and ninja-esque martial arts moves". Betsy Braddock was chosen as one of the 20 "muses" of video games by Brazilian magazine SuperGamePower in 2001. In the 2009 Marvel poll asking who is the better fighter in Marvel vs. Capcom 2, Betsy Braddock got over two-thirds of the votes (68%) against the Street Fighter series icon and the fighting game genre female symbol Chun-Li. UGO ranked her as fifth on their 2011 list of fighting games' finest female fighters for her appearances in Capcom titles, stating that "the only thing more confusing than Psylocke's backstory is what exactly her powers are [but] all you really need to know is this: Psylocke is a sexy Asian lady ninja sporting the most obscene butt-floss this side of Linda Kozlowski in Crocodile Dundee". Complex included her in their 2012 list of the most humiliating victory quotes in fighting games.

- In 2014, Entertainment Weekly ranked Psylocke 22nd in their "Let's rank every X-Man ever" list.
- In 2018, CBR.com ranked Psylocke 4th in their "X-Force: 20 Powerful Members" list.

== See also ==
- Ninja in popular culture
