= Not Now, I'll Tell You When =

Studio album by Count Basie & His Orchestra
- Released: 1960
- Recorded: June 7, 9, 16 & 24, 1960; New York City
- Genre: Jazz
- Length: 35:31
- Label: Roulette; SR 52044

Count Basie chronology
String Along with Basie (1960)	Not Now, I'll Tell You When (1960)	The Count Basie Story (1960)

Not Now, I'll Tell You When is an album by pianist and bandleader Count Basie featuring tracks recorded in 1960 and originally released on the Roulette label.

== Reception ==
Professional ratings
Review scores
Source	Rating
AllMusic	3/5 stars

AllMusic awarded the album 3 stars and its review by Scott Yanow states, "Because of the obscure repertoire, this is a fine LP for veteran Basie collectors. The band is in its usual swinging form".

== Track listing ==
1. "Not Now, I'll Tell You When" (Thad Jones, Count Basie) - 3:37
2. "Rare Butterfly" (Frank Foster, Basie) - 4:32
3. "Back to the Apple" (Foster, Basie) - 4:42
4. "Ol' Man River" (Jerome Kern, Oscar Hammerstein II) - 4:52
5. "Mama's Talkin' Soft" (Jules Styne, Stephen Sondheim) - 4:23
6. "The Daly Jump" (Freddie Green, Basie) - 4:07
7. "Blue on Blue" (Frank Wess, Basie) - 3:02
8. "Swinging at the Waldorf" (Wess, Basie) - 3:40
9. "Sweet and Purty" (Jones, Basie) - 3:26

== Personnel ==
- Count Basie - piano
- Sonny Cohn, Thad Jones, Joe Newman, Snooky Young - trumpet
- Henry Coker, Al Grey, Benny Powell - trombone
- Marshal Royal - alto saxophone, clarinet
- Frank Wess - alto saxophone, tenor saxophone, flute
- Frank Foster, Billy Mitchell - tenor saxophone
- Charlie Fowlkes - baritone saxophone
- Freddie Green - guitar
- Eddie Jones - bass
- Sonny Payne - drums
