= Matsu'o Tsurayaba =

- Matsu'o Tsurayaba from Uncanny X-Men #256. Art by Jim Lee.

Publication information
- Publisher: Marvel Comics
- First appearance: Uncanny X-Men #255 (December 1989)
- Created by: Chris Claremont

In-story information
- Alter ego: Matsu'o Tsurayaba
- Team affiliations: The Hand
- Abilities: Martial artist

Matsu'o Tsurayaba is a fictional character appearing in American comic books published by Marvel Comics. The character is usually depicted as a member of the Hand, Tsurayaba's first appearance came in Uncanny X-Men #255 and was involved in the body swap between Betsy Braddock and Kwannon, which lasted 25 years of publication history before being reversed.

== Fictional character biography ==
Matsu'o Tsurayaba was a Hand assassin working in Japan. His love, another assassin by the name of Kwannon, worked for an opposing crime boss named Nyorin. Though they knew their respective employers would eventually clash, the two remained lovers, and vowed to fight honorably to the death should they have to. Matsu'o was ordered by the Hand to kill Nyorin, and during his fight with Kwannon, she slipped and fell from the cliffs they were on to the ocean below. Matsu'o brought Kwannon's broken body to the labs of the Hand. They were able to keep her body alive, but her mind was shattered beyond repair.

Soon after, Psylocke emerges from the Siege Perilous onto the beach of an island belonging to the Hand, having sustained amnesia. Matsu'o plans to transplant the mind of Kwannon into the body of Psylocke. Kwannon possesses a natural empathic ability that would ensure her mind survives contact with a high-level telepath's like Psylocke, but her body is too weak for such a transfer. Matsu'o contacts the villain Spiral, who agreed to help. Spiral swaps Psylocke and Kwannon's consciousness and splits Psylocke's telepathy between them. Matsu'o aids Psylocke in her recovery, training her in various martial arts and making her into an assassin.

Kwannon is left with amnesia following Spiral's mind transfer and becomes known as Revanche. She later contracts the Legacy Virus, increasing her telepathy to the extent that she remembers her original identity. Near death, Revanche confronts Matsu'o, who finally admits the truth and begs for forgiveness. At Revanche's request, Matsu'o kills her before the virus can. With Kwannon's death, Psylocke regains her full power. Matsu'o intends to commit suicide to join Revanche in death, but is stopped by Psylocke, who convinces him to honor her memory by becoming the man she would have wanted.

Matsu'o's resolve to become a better person would not last. His enmity with Wolverine leads him to initiate an attack on his lover, Mariko Yashida. After distracting Wolverine, Matsu'o sends an assassin to kill Mariko by poisoning her. Enraged, Wolverine attacks Matsu'o and cuts off his arm. He then vows to return each year and cut off more of Matsu'o's body parts.

Some time later, Matsu'o is now missing both hands and other body parts. He desires an honorable death and wants Psylocke to grant him that honor, since he cannot hold a blade to perform seppuku. Before Psylocke can oblige, Wolverine emerges from the shadows and says that Matsu'o's punishment is not over yet. The two X-Men engage in a brutal fight that ends in a standstill. Wolverine relents, allowing Psylocke to kill Matsu'o.

== Powers and abilities ==
Matsu'o Tsurayaba is trained in various martial arts disciplines. He once wore a prosthetic right hand with retractable finger blades.

Matsu'o Tsurayaba's strength has been augmented with cybernetic implants. On occasion, he has worn an armored battlesuit of unrevealed capabilities.
