= A Little Juicy =

Studio album by Billy Mitchell Quintet with Thad Jones
- Released: 1964
- Recorded: August 1 & 6, 1963
- Studio: A & R Studios, NYC
- Genre: Jazz
- Length: 35:07
- Label: Smash; MGS 27042/SRS 67042

Billy Mitchell chronology
Night Song (1962)	A Little Juicy (1964)	Now's the Time (1977)

A Little Juicy is an album by saxophonist Billy Mitchell, released in 1964 on Smash Records.

Professional ratings
Review scores
Source	Rating
Allmusic	3/5 stars

== Track listing ==
All compositions by Thad Jones except where noted

1. "Little Juicy" – 7:48
2. "Stella by Starlight" (Victor Young, Ned Washington) – 6:43
3. "Bossa Nova Ova" – 3:20
4. "Brother Peabody" – 5:54
5. "Oliver Jr." (Billy Mitchell, Kenny Burrell) – 6:10
6. "Kids are Pretty People" – 5:12

== Personnel ==
- Billy Mitchell – tenor saxophone
- Thad Jones – trumpet
- Kenny Burrell – guitar
- Richard Wyands – piano
- Herman Wright – bass
- Oliver Jackson Jr. – drums
