= The Colossus of Detroit =

The Colossus Of Detroit

Studio album by Billy Mitchell
- Released: 1978
- Recorded: April 18, 1978
- Genre: Jazz
- Length: 42:16
- Label: Xanadu; 158
- Producer: Don Schlitten

Billy Mitchell chronology
Now's the Time (1977)	The Colossus Of Detroit (1978)	Xanadu in Africa (1980)

The Colossus Of Detroit is an album by jazz saxophonist Billy Mitchell, released in 1978 by Xanadu Records.

== Reception ==
Professional ratings
Review scores
Source	Rating
Allmusic	4.5/5 stars

The Allmusic review by Scott Yanow stated "Veteran tenor saxophonist Billy Mitchell could not ask for a better rhythm section than he has here ... The results are quite boppish and one of Mitchell's better recordings of the past 20 years".

== Track listing ==
1. "Recorda-Me" (Joe Henderson) - 8:25
2. "I Had the Craziest Dream" (Harry Warren, Mack Gordon) - 6:07
3. "I Should Care" (Axel Stordahl, Paul Weston, Sammy Cahn) - 7:06
4. "Unforgettable" (Irving Gordon) - 9:25
5. "How Am I to Know?" (Jack King, Dorothy Parker) - 5:05
6. "Be My Guest" (Fats Domino) - 6:08

== Personnel ==
- Billy Mitchell - saxophone
- Barry Harris - piano
- Sam Jones - bass
- Walter Bolden - drums
