= Shades of Grey (Al Grey album) =

Studio album by Al Grey
- Released: 1965
- Recorded: February 1965
- Studio: New York City
- Genre: Jazz
- Label: Tangerine
- Producer: Ray Charles

Al Grey chronology
Boss Bone (1963)	Shades of Grey (1965)	Key Bone (1972)

Shades of Grey is an album by trombonist Al Grey released in 1965 on the Tangerine label as TRCS-1504.

Professional ratings
Review scores
Source	Rating
AllMusic	3/5 stars

== Track listing ==
All compositions by Al Grey and Roger Spotts except where noted

1. "Toin Me Loose" (Al Grey) – 4:25
2. "Bewitched" (Richard Rodgers, Lorenz Hart) – 3:46
3. "I Know You Want Me" – 3:26
4. "Put It on Mellow" 7:30
5. "Dinnertime" (Roger Spotts) – 6:35
6. "Dinah" (Harry Akst, Joe Young, Sam M. Lewis) – 3:49
7. "A New Blues" – 4:41
8. "Jilly's Honey" (Grey, Sonny Payne) – 4:30

== Personnel ==
- Al Grey – trombone, leader
- Harry "Sweets" Edison – trumpet
- William Hughes, Grover Mitchell (tracks 2 & 3) – trombone
- Elvira Redd (tracks 4 & 6) – alto saxophone
- Eddie "Lockjaw" Davis – tenor saxophone
- Kirk Stuart – piano, organ
- Wyatt Ruther – bass
- Rufus Jones (track 2–4 & 6), Sonny Payne (tracks 1, 5, 7 & 8) – drums
- Roger Spotts – arranger
