= Struttin' and Shoutin' =

Studio album by Al Grey
- Released: 1983
- Recorded: August 30, 1976
- Studio: New York
- Genre: Jazz
- Label: Columbia; FC 38505
- Producer: John Hammond

Al Grey chronology
Grey's Mood (1973–75)	Struttin' and Shoutin' (1983)	Al Grey Featuring Arnett Cobb and Jimmy Forrest (1977)

Struttin' and Shoutin' is an album by trombonist Al Grey recorded in 1976 but not released on Columbia Records until 1983.

== Reception ==
Professional ratings
Review scores
Source	Rating
Allmusic	4/5 stars
The Rolling Stone Jazz Record Guide	4/5 stars

The Rolling Stone Jazz Record Guide said "the entire date has an energetic but familiar feel". The Allmusic review stated "Trombonist Al Grey, a master of the wah-wah mute, had a rare opportunity to record with a major label in 1976. But Columbia almost lost the master, and when it was finally released in 1983, one of the principals (tenor saxophonist Jimmy Forrest) had already died. Despite its delayed arrival, this upbeat set (dominated by soulful blues but also including two standards) was worth the wait".

== Track listing ==
All compositions by Al Grey except where noted

1. "Blues, Ray and Grey" (Ernie Wilkins) – 6:48
2. "Stardust" (Hoagy Carmichael, Mitchell Parish) – 5:55
3. "Reverend Grey" – 6:01
4. "Struttin' and Shoutin'" – 5:04
5. "All of Me" (Gerald Marks, Seymour Simons) – 4:25
6. "Potholes" (Wilkins) – 4:05
7. "Homage to Norman" – 3:00

== Personnel ==
- Al Grey – trombone
- Danny Moore, Waymon Reed – trumpet
- Jack Jeffers – bass trombone
- Ernie Wilkins – soprano saxophone (track 2)
- Jimmy Forrest – tenor saxophone
- Cecil Payne – baritone saxophone
- Ray Bryant – piano
- Milt Hinton – bass
- Bobby Durham – drums
