= Dance Along with Basie =

Studio album by Count Basie & His Orchestra
- Released: 1960
- Recorded: December 16, 18, 28, 30 & 31, 1959; New York City
- Genre: Jazz
- Label: Roulette; SR 52036
- Producer: Teddy Reig

Count Basie chronology
Everyday I Have the Blues (1959)	Dance Along with Basie (1960)	String Along with Basie (1960)

Dance Along with Basie is an album released by pianist, composer and bandleader Count Basie featuring tracks recorded in late 1959 and originally released on the Roulette label.

== Reception ==
Professional ratings
Review scores
Source	Rating
AllMusic	3/5 stars

The album won the Best Performance by a Band for Dancing at the 3rd Annual Grammy Awards. AllMusic awarded the album 3 stars.

== Track listing ==
1. "It Had to Be You" (Isham Jones, Gus Kahn) - 2:56
2. "Makin' Whoopee" (Walter Donaldson, Kahn) - 4:00
3. "Can't We Be Friends" (Paul James, Kay Swift) - 5:22
4. "Misty" (Erroll Garner) - 3:35
5. "It's a Pity to Say Goodnight" (Billy Reid) - 3:37
6. "How Am I to Know" (Jack King, Dorothy Parker) - 2:26
7. "Easy Living" (Ralph Rainger, Leo Robin) - 3:35
8. "Fools Rush In" (Rube Bloom, Johnny Mercer) - 3:10
9. "Secret Love" (Sammy Fain, Mercer) - 3:17
10. "Give Me the Simple Life" (Bloom, Harry Ruby) - 3:32

== Personnel ==
- Count Basie - piano
- John Anderson, Thad Jones, Joe Newman, Snooky Young - trumpet
- Henry Coker, Al Grey, Benny Powell - trombone
- Marshal Royal - alto saxophone, clarinet
- Frank Wess - alto saxophone, tenor saxophone, flute
- Frank Foster, Billy Mitchell - tenor saxophone
- Charlie Fowlkes - baritone saxophone
- Freddie Green - guitar
- Eddie Jones - bass
- Sonny Payne - drums
