= Grey's Mood =

Studio album by Al Grey
- Released: 1979
- Recorded: April 3, 1973 and October 7, 1975
- Studio: Barclay Studio, Paris, France
- Genre: Jazz
- Length: 55:00 CD reissue with bonus tracks
- Label: Black and Blue; 33.085
- Producer: Disques Black and Blue SARL

Al Grey chronology
Al Grey et Wild Bill Davis (1972)	Grey's Mood (1979)	Struttin' and Shoutin' (1976)

Grey's Mood is an album by trombonist Al Grey recorded in Paris at sessions in 1973 and 1975 and released on the French Black and Blue label in 1979.

== Reception ==
Professional ratings
Review scores
Source	Rating
Allmusic	3/5 stars

The Allmusic review stated "This excellent set features Al Grey on two sessions in peak form. The trombonist is the lead voice in an octet for four numbers that also feature tenorman Hal Singer, and he joins forces with tenor saxophonist Jimmy Forrest (they were both in Count Basie's band at the time) in a quintet also including pianist Tommy Flanagan for three other tunes. ... Accessible and swinging music".

== Track listing ==
All compositions by Al Grey except where noted

1. "Face It Here It Is" – 5:08
2. "Night Train" (Jimmy Forrest) – 5:10 Bonus track on CD reissue
3. "Catch Up With That" – 3:17
4. "Solitude" (Duke Ellington, Eddie DeLange, Irving Mills) – 3:32 Bonus track on CD reissue
5. "Grey's Mood" – 6:24
6. "Drums on Chris" – 3:00
7. "Bedroom Eyes" – 7:07
8. "Something for Grey" (Claude Gousset) – 6:36
9. "Shufflin' in Orange's Arenes" – 2:27 Bonus track on CD reissue
10. "Mellow for Love" – 8:54
11. "Catch Up With That" [alternate take] – 3:25 Bonus track on CD reissue
- Recorded at Barclay Studio in Paris, France, on April 3, 1973 (tracks 4–6, 8 & 9) and October 7, 1975 (tracks 1–3, 7, 10 & 11)

== Personnel ==
- Al Grey – trombone
- Xavier Chambon – trumpet (tracks 4–6, 8 & 9)
- Claude Gousset – trombone (tracks 4–6, 8 & 9)
- Michel Attenoux – alto saxophone (tracks 4–6, 8 & 9)
- Jimmy Forrest (tracks 1–3, 7, 10 & 11), Hal Singer (tracks 4–6, 8 & 9) – tenor saxophone
- Tommy Flanagan – piano (tracks 1–3, 7, 10 & 11)
- Stan Hunter – organ (tracks 4–6, 8 & 9)
- Clarence "Gatemouth" Brown – guitar (tracks 4–6, 8 & 9)
- John Duke – bass (tracks 1–3, 7, 10 & 11)
- Chris Columbus (tracks 4–6, 8 & 9), Bobby Durham (tracks 1–3, 7, 10 & 11) – drums
