= Now's the Time (Billy Mitchell album) =

Live album by Billy Mitchell
- Released: 1976
- Recorded: 1976
- Genre: Jazz
- Length: 46:09
- Label: Catalyst; CAT-7611
- Producer: John R. Rowland, Billy Mitchell

Billy Mitchell chronology
A Little Juicy (1963)	Now's the Time (1976)	The Colossus of Detroit (1978)

Now's the Time is an album by saxophonist Billy Mitchell recorded in 1976 for the Catalyst label.

== Reception ==
Professional ratings
Review scores
Source	Rating
Allmusic	4/5 stars

The Allmusic review by Scott Yanow stated "Billy Mitchell's first album in 13 years is decent, but not all that special. The live set features Mitchell on tenor, soprano and alto performing a pair of lengthy blues and two fairly basic originals. ... Mitchell sounds fine, but nothing that special occurs".

== Track listing ==
All compositions by Billy Mitchell except where noted.

1. "My Song" – 9:08
2. "T.O. Blues" – 7:03
3. "Now's the Time" (Charlie Parker) – 12:33
4. "Wonderful" – 17:44

== Personnel ==
- Billy Mitchell – tenor saxophone, soprano saxophone, alto saxophone
- Roland Prince – electric guitar
- Wes Belcamp – piano
- Earl May – bass
- Al Beldini (track 3), Ron Turso – drums
