= Night Song (Al Grey album) =

Studio album by Al Grey with Billy Mitchell
- Released: 1963
- Recorded: November 2 & 5, 1962
- Studio: Ter-Mar Studios, Chicago, IL
- Genre: Jazz
- Length: 33:20
- Label: Argo; LP-711
- Producer: Esmond Edwards

Al Grey chronology
Snap Your Fingers (1962)	Night Song (1963)	Having a Ball (1963)

Billy Mitchell chronology
This Is Billy Mitchell (1962)	Night Song (1962)	A Little Juicy (1963)

Night Song is an album by trombonist Al Grey with saxophonist Billy Mitchell released in 1963 on the Argo label.

Professional ratings
Review scores
Source	Rating
Allmusic	4/5 stars

== Track listing ==
1. "Blues in the Night" (Harold Arlen, Johnny Mercer) – 5:20
2. "Stella by Starlight" (Victor Young, Ned Washington) – 6:10
3. "The Way You Look Tonight" (Jerome Kern, Dorothy Fields) – 4:55
4. "Through for the Night" (Trummy Young) – 4:10
5. "Stardust" (Hoagy Carmichael, Mitchell Parish) – 5:20
6. "Night and Day" (Cole Porter) – 4:30
7. "Laughing Tonight" (Al Frisch, Roy Alfred) – 2:55

== Personnel ==
- Al Grey – trombone
- Billy Mitchell – tenor saxophone
- David Burns – trumpet
- Bobby Hutcherson – vibraphone
- Earl Washington – piano
- Herman Wright – bass
- Otis "Candy" Finch – drums
- Phil Thomas – percussion
