= Benny Powell =

American jazz trombonist (1930–2010)

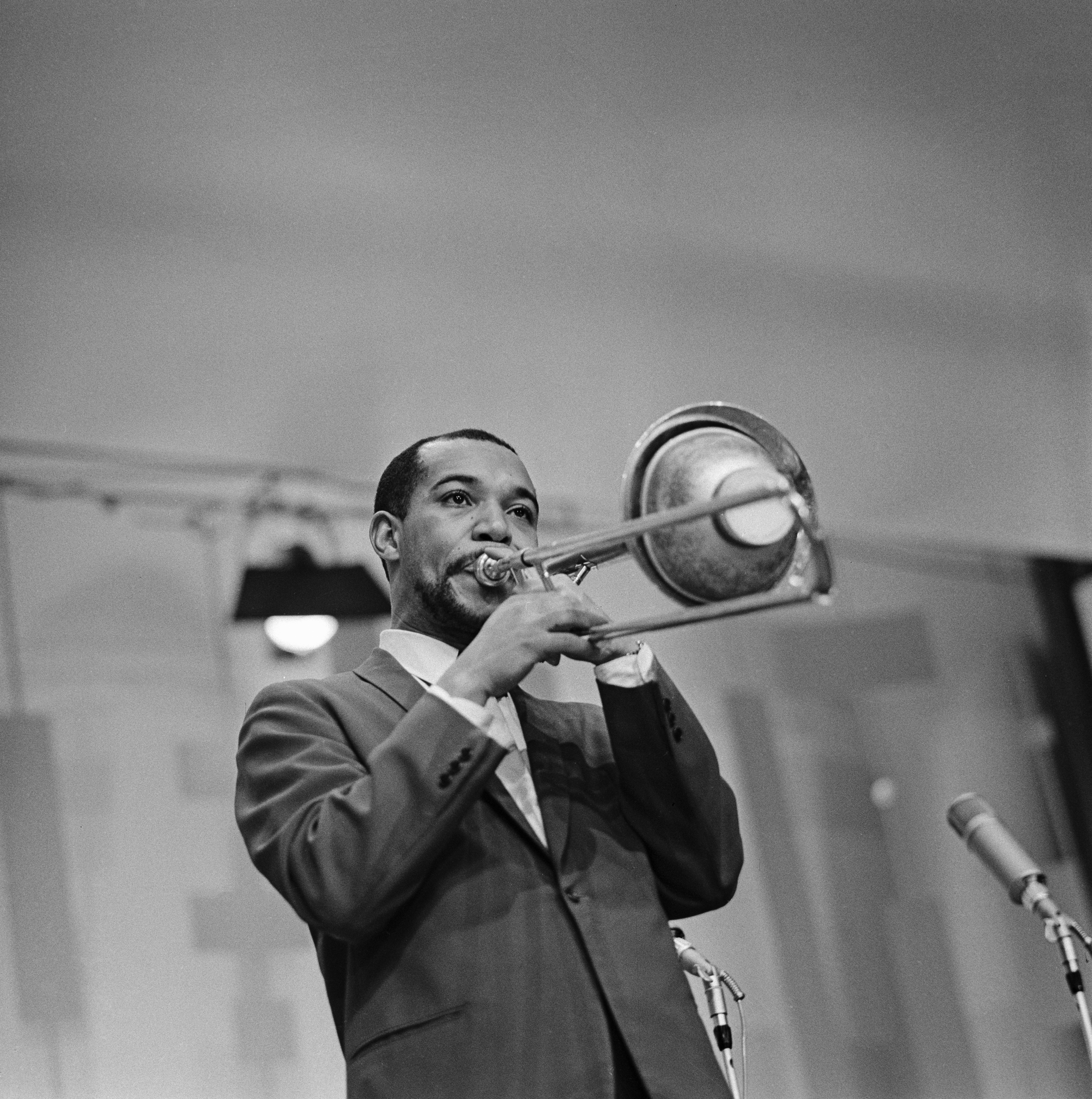
- Benny Powell in 1962

Background information
- Birth name: Benjamin Gordon Powell Jr.
- Born: March 1, 1930; New Orleans, Louisiana
- Died: June 26, 2010 (aged 80); Manhattan
- Genres: Jazz
- Instrument: Trombone
- Years active: 1951–1994
- Spouse: Evelyn Jackson (m. 1958)

Benjamin Gordon Powell Jr. (March 1, 1930 – June 26, 2010) was an American jazz trombonist. He played both standard (tenor) trombone and bass trombone.

== Biography ==
Born Benjamin Gordon Powell Jr. in New Orleans, Louisiana, he first played professionally at the age of 14, and at 18 began playing with Lionel Hampton. In 1951 he left Hampton's band and began playing with Count Basie, in whose orchestra he would remain until 1963. Powell takes the trombone solo in the bridge of Basie's 1955 recording of "April in Paris".

After leaving Basie, he freelanced in New York City. From 1966 to 1970 he was a member of the Thad Jones-Mel Lewis Jazz Orchestra, playing on Monday nights at the Village Vanguard. Among other engagements, he played in the house band of the Merv Griffin Show, and when the show moved to Los Angeles, California, in 1970 Powell also relocated there. He did extensive work as a session musician, including with Abdullah Ibrahim, John Carter, and Randy Weston. Later in his career Powell worked as an educator, including as part of the Jazzmobile project. Having moved back to New York in the 1980s, he began teaching at the New School for Jazz and Contemporary Music in 1994.

He died in a Manhattan hospital at the age of 80, following back surgery.

== Personal ==
Powell married Evelyn Jackson at St. Bernard Catholic Church in New York in 1958.

== Discography ==
=== As leader ===
- Coast to Coast (Trident, 1982)
- The Gift of Love (Faith, 2003)
- Nextep (Origin, 2008)

=== As sideman ===
With Pepper Adams

- Pepper Adams Plays the Compositions of Charlie Mingus (Workshop Jazz, 1964)

With Gene Ammons

- Free Again (Prestige, 1971)

With Count Basie

- The Count! (Clef, 1952 [1955])
- Basie Jazz (Clef, 1952 [1954])
- Dance Session (Clef, 1953)
- Dance Session Album #2 (Clef, 1954)
- Basie (Clef, 1954)
- Count Basie Swings, Joe Williams Sings (Clef, 1955) with Joe Williams
- April in Paris (Verve, 1956)
- The Greatest!! Count Basie Plays, Joe Williams Sings Standards with Joe Williams
- Metronome All-Stars 1956 (Clef, 1956) with Ella Fitzgerald and Joe Williams
- Hall of Fame (Verve, 1956 [1959])
- Basie in London (Verve, 1956)
- One O'Clock Jump (Verve, 1957) with Joe Williams and Ella Fitzgerald
- Count Basie at Newport (Verve, 1957)
- The Atomic Mr. Basie (Roulette, 1957) aka Basie and E=MC^{2}
- Basie Plays Hefti (Roulette, 1958)
- Sing Along with Basie (Roulette, 1958) with Joe Williams and Lambert, Hendricks & Ross
- Basie One More Time (Roulette, 1959)
- Breakfast Dance and Barbecue (Roulette, 1959)
- Everyday I Have the Blues (Roulette, 1959) - with Joe Williams
- Dance Along with Basie (Roulette, 1959)
- String Along with Basie (Roulette, 1960)
- Not Now, I'll Tell You When (Roulette, 1960)
- The Count Basie Story (Roulette, 1960)
- Kansas City Suite (Roulette, 1960)
- The Legend (Roulette, 1961)
- Back with Basie (Roulette, 1962)
- Basie in Sweden (Roulette, 1962)
- On My Way & Shoutin' Again! (Verve, 1962)
- This Time by Basie! (Reprise, 1963)
- More Hits of the 50's and 60's (Verve, 1963)

With Donald Byrd

- Jazz Lab (Columbia, 1957) with Gigi Gryce

With Benny Carter

- Harlem Renaissance (MusicMasters, 1992)

With John Carter

- Castles of Ghana (Gramavision, 1986)
- Dance of the Love Ghosts (Gramavision, 1987)
- Fields (Gramavision, 1988)
- Shadows on a Wall [Gramavision, 1989)

With Buck Clayton

- How Hi the Fi (Columbia, 1954)

With Hank Crawford

- Mr. Blues Plays Lady Soul (Atlantic, 1969)

With Dameronia

- Look Stop Listen (Uptown, 1983)
- Live at the Theatre Boulogne-Billancourt Paris (Soul Note, 1989 [1994])

With Frank Foster

- No 'Count (Savoy, 1956)

With Al Grey

- The Last of the Big Plungers (Argo, 1959)
- The Thinking Man’s Trombone (Argo, 1960)

With Eddie Harris

- Silver Cycles (Atlantic, 1968)
- How Can You Live Like That? (Atlantic, 1976)

With Jimmy Heath

- New Picture (Landmark, 1985)
- Little Man Big Band (Verve, 1992)

With Johnny Hodges

- Triple Play (RCA Victor, 1967)

With J. J. Johnson

- The Total J.J. Johnson (RCA Victor, 1967)

With Clifford Jordan

- Play What You Feel (Mapleshade, 1990 [1997])

With Bobby Bland and B.B. King

- Bobby Bland and B. B. King Together Again...Live (MCA, 1976)

with Melba Liston

- Melba Liston and Her 'Bones (MetroJazz, 1958)

With Herbie Mann

- Glory of Love (CTI, 1967)

With Les McCann

- Comment (Atlantic, 1970)

With David Newman

- Bigger & Better (Atlantic, 1968)
- The Many Facets of David Newman (Atlantic, 1969)
- Cityscape (HighNote, 2006)

With Joe Newman

- The Count's Men (Jazztone, 1955)
- Salute to Satch (RCA Victor, 1956)

With Chico O'Farrill

- Nine Flags (Impulse!, 1966)

With Moacir Santos

- Saudade (Blue Note, 1974)

With Frank Wess

- North, South, East....Wess (Savoy 1956)

With Randy Weston

- Spirits of Our Ancestors (recorded 1991)
- Volcano Blues (recorded 1993)
- Saga (recorded 1995)
- Khepera (recorded 1998)
- Spirit! The Power of Music (recorded 1999)
- Live in St. Lucia (recorded 2002)

With Gerald Wilson

- New York, New Sound (Mack Avenue, 2003)
- In My Time (Mack Avenue, 2005)
