= Dizzy Atmosphere (album) =

1957 studio album

Studio album by Al Grey, Billy Mitchell, Lee Morgan, Charlie Persip, Paul West, Billy Root, Wynton Kelly
- Released: 1957
- Recorded: February 18, 1957
- Venue: Master Recorders, Hollywood, CA
- Genre: Jazz
- Length: 51:46 CD reissue with bonus tracks
- Label: Specialty; SP-5001
- Producer: Art Rupe

Al Grey chronology
Dizzy Atmosphere (1957)	The Last of the Big Plungers (1959)

Billy Mitchell chronology
Dizzy Atmosphere (1957)	The Al Grey – Billy Mitchell Sextet (1961)

Lee Morgan chronology
Lee Morgan Sextet (1956)	Dizzy Atmosphere (1957)	Lee Morgan Vol. 3 (1957)

Dizzy Atmosphere is an album featuring members of Dizzy Gillespie's Orchestra including trombonist Al Grey, saxophonist Billy Mitchell and trumpeter Lee Morgan recorded in 1957 and released on the Specialty label.

== Reception ==
Professional ratings
Review scores
Source	Rating
Allmusic	4/5 stars
Disc	4/5 stars
The Penguin Guide to Jazz	3/4 stars

The Allmusic review by Scott Yanow stated "the music is modern bop for the period. Highlights include the ten-and-a-half-minute "Dishwater," "Over the Rainbow," and an early version of Golson's "Whisper Not." Morgan plays extremely well throughout the spirited set, and he was just 18 at the time".

== Track listing ==
All compositions by Roger Spotts except where noted.

1. "Dishwater" – 12:05
2. "Someone I Know" – 3:59
3. "D.D.T." – 4:04
4. "Whisper Not" (Benny Golson) – 5:55
5. "About Time" – 3:14
6. "Day by Day" (Axel Stordahl, Paul Weston, Sammy Cahn) – 3:26
7. "Rite of Swing" – 3:14
8. "Over the Rainbow" (Harold Arlen, Yip Harburg) – 4:18
9. "Someone I Know" [take 3 – alternate] – 4:07 Bonus track on CD reissue
10. "Whisper Not" [take 3–4 – alternate] (Golson) – 6:01 Bonus track on CD reissue
11. "Over the Rainbow" [take 3 – alternate] (Arlen, Harburg) – 4:34 Bonus track on CD reissue

== Personnel ==
- Lee Morgan – trumpet
- Al Grey – trombone
- Billy Mitchell – tenor saxophone
- Billy Root – baritone saxophone
- Wynton Kelly – piano
- Paul West – bass
- Charlie Persip – drums
- Benny Golson (tracks 4, 6 & 10), Roger Spotts (tracks 1–3, 5, 7–9 & 11) – arranger
