= Kansas City Suite =

Studio album by Count Basie & His Orchestra
- Released: 1960
- Recorded: September 6, 1960; Los Angeles, CA
- Genre: Jazz
- Length: 35:31
- Label: Roulette; SR 52056
- Producer: Teddy Reig

Count Basie chronology
The Count Basie Story (1960)	Kansas City Suite (1960)	Count Basie/Sarah Vaughan (1961)

Kansas City Suite (subtitled The Music of Benny Carter) is an album by pianist, composer and bandleader Count Basie featuring tracks recorded in 1960 and originally released on the Roulette label.

== Reception ==
Professional ratings
Review scores
Source	Rating
AllMusic	4.5/5 stars

AllMusic awarded the album 4½ stars and its review by Scott Yanow states: "The band swings throughout as usual, with concise solos adding color to this memorable modern session".

== Track listing ==
All compositions by Benny Carter

1. "Vine Street Rumble" – 3:33
2. "Katy-Do" – 4:19
3. "Miss Missouri" – 5:10
4. "Jackson County Jubilee" – 2:30
5. "Sunset Glow" – 2:27
6. "The Wiggle Walk" – 3:53
7. "Meetin' Time" – 3:23
8. "Paseo Promenade" – 3:23
9. "Blue Five Jive" – 3:56
10. "Rompin' at the Reno" – 2:14

== Personnel ==
- Count Basie – piano
- Sonny Cohn, Thad Jones, Joe Newman, Snooky Young – trumpet
- Henry Coker, Al Grey, Benny Powell – trombone
- Marshal Royal – alto saxophone, clarinet
- Frank Wess – alto saxophone, tenor saxophone, flute
- Frank Foster, Billy Mitchell – tenor saxophone
- Charlie Fowlkes – baritone saxophone
- Freddie Green – guitar
- Eddie Jones – bass
- Sonny Payne – drums
- Benny Carter – arranger
