= Having a Ball =

Studio album by Al Grey
- Released: 1963
- Recorded: January 29, 1963
- Studios: Van Gelder Studio, Englewood Cliffs, NJ
- Genre: Jazz
- Labels: Argo; LP-718
- Producer: Esmond Edwards

Al Grey chronology
Night Songs (1962)	Having a Ball (1963)	Boss Bone (1963)

Having a Ball is an album by trombonist Al Grey released in 1963 on the Argo label.

Professional ratings
Review scores
Source	Rating
Allmusic	4.5/5 stars

== Track listing ==
All compositions by Al Grey except where noted

1. "Deep Fried" – 3:45
2. "One Day I'll Show You" (Maurice McAllister) – 5:30
3. "Something's Got a Hold on Me" (Etta James, Leroy Kirkland, Pearl Woods) – 5:15
4. "I Don't Want To Cry" (Chuck Jackson, Luther Dixon) – 3:05
5. "Stand By Me" (Ben E. King, Elmo Glick) – 3:50
6. "Boss Tina" – 4:45
7. "Rinky Dink" (David Clowney, Paul Winley) – 3:45
8. "Stone Crazy" – 5:15

== Personnel ==
- Al Grey – trombone
- David Burns – trumpet
- Bobby Hutcherson – vibraphone (tracks 1, 3–6 & 9)
- Calvin Newborn – guitar
- Hugh Lawson – piano
- Herman Wright – bass
- Otis Finch – drums
