= Boss Bone =

Studio album by Al Grey
- Released: 1964
- Recorded: December 17, 1963
- Studio: Ter-Mar Studios, Chicago, IL
- Genre: Jazz
- Label: Argo; LP-731
- Producer: Esmond Edwards

Al Grey chronology
Having a Ball (1963)	Boss Bone (1964)	Shades of Grey (1965)

Boss Bone is an album by trombonist Al Grey recorded in late 1963 and released on the Argo label.

Professional ratings
Review scores
Source	Rating
Allmusic	3/5 stars

== Track listing ==
All compositions by Al Gey except where noted

1. "Smile" (Charlie Chaplin, John Turner, Geoffrey Parsons) – 2:45
2. "Terrible Cap" – 3:02
3. "Mona Lisa" (Ray Evans, Jay Livingston) – 3:30
4. "Tacos and Grits" – 3:22
5. "Can't You Feel It" – 4:05
6. "Salty Mama" – 3:30
7. "The Give Off" – 4:32
8. "Day In, Day Out" (Rube Bloom, Johnny Mercer) – 5:50
9. "Grey Being Blue" – 5:47

== Personnel ==
- Al Grey – trombone
- John Young – piano
- Leo Blevins – guitar
- Ike Isaacs – bass
- Phil Thomas – drums
