= The Last of the Big Plungers =

Studio album by Al Grey and the Basie Wing
- Released: 1960
- Recorded: September 25 & 28, 1959
- Venue: Ter-Mar Studios, Chicago, IL
- Genre: Jazz
- Label: Argo; LP-653
- Producer: Jack Tracy

Al Grey chronology
Dizzy Atmosphere (1957)	The Last of the Big Plungers (1960)	The Thinking Man’s Trombone (1960)

The Last of the Big Plungers is an album by trombonist Al Grey and the Basie Wing released in 1960 on Argo Records.

Professional ratings
Review scores
Source	Rating
Allmusic	3/5 stars
DownBeat	3.5/5 stars

== Track listing ==
1. "Things Ain't What They Used to Be" (Mercer Ellington, Ted Persons) – 3:41
2. "Open Wider, Please" (Al Grey) – 4:48
3. "I Got It Bad (and That Ain't Good)" (Duke Ellington, Paul Francis Webster) – 3:15
4. "Don't Get Around Much Anymore" (Duke Ellington, Bob Russell) – 3:03
5. "How Come You Do Me Like You Do?" (Gene Austin, Roy Bergere) – 2:29
6. "Bluish Grey" (Thad Jones) – 3:10
7. "The Elder" (Jones) – 5:10
8. "Bewitched" (Richard Rodgers, Lorenz Hart) – 3:34
9. "Kenie-Konie" (Frank Foster) – 6:03

== Personnel ==
- Al Grey – trombone, bandleader
- Joe Newman – trumpet
- Benny Powell – trombone
- Billy Mitchell – tenor saxophone
- Charlie Fowlkes – baritone saxophone
- Floyd Morris – piano
- Ed Jones – bass
- Sonny Payne – drums
