= Dave Burns (musician) =

American jazz musician

David Burns (March 24, 1924, Perth Amboy, New Jersey – April 5, 2009, Freeport, New York) was an American jazz trumpeter, flugelhornist, arranger, composer, and teacher.

Burns began playing trumpet when he was nine years old, and heard bebop performances at Minton's Playhouse as a teenager, including Dizzy Gillespie. His first ensemble was Al Cooper's Savoy Sultans, with whom he played from 1941 to 1943, then joined the Army Air Force and led a band from 1943 to 1945 that included James Moody as a sideman. He joined Gillespie's band in 1946 and appeared with Gillespie in Jivin' in Bebop in 1947. After leaving Gillespie's band in 1949, he worked with Duke Ellington from 1950 to 1952 and then with James Moody until 1957.

In the late 1950s, he played shows in New York City, and in the 1960s he recorded for Vanguard Records and worked with Billy Mitchell, Al Grey, Willie Bobo, Art Taylor, Dexter Gordon, Johnny Griffin, Leo Parker, and Milt Jackson. He worked increasingly as a teacher from the 1970s through the end of his career.

== Discography ==
=== As leader ===
- Dave Burns (Vanguard, 1962)
- Warming Up! (Vanguard, 1964)

=== As sideman ===
With Al Grey

- Snap Your Fingers (Argo, 1962)
- Having a Ball (Argo, 1963)
- Night Song (Argo, 1963)

With James Moody

- Hi Fi Party (Prestige, 1955)
- James Moody's Moods (Prestige, 1956)
- Wail, Moody, Wail (Prestige, 1956)
- Moody's Workshop (Prestige, 1960)

With others

- Bill English, Bill English (Vanguard, 1963)
- Dizzy Gillespie, Live at the Downbeat Club Summer 1947 (Jazz Guild, 1977)
- Dexter Gordon, Landslide (Blue Note, 1980)
- Johnny Griffin, Studio Jazz Party (Riverside, 1961)
- Milt Jackson, Big Bags (Riverside, 1962)
- Milt Jackson, For Someone I Love (Riverside, 1963)
- Eddie Jefferson, Body and Soul (Prestige, 1968)
- Billy Mitchell, This Is Billy Mitchell (Smash, 1962)
- Leo Parker, Rollin' with Leo (Blue Note, 1980)
- Dave Pike, Manhattan Latin (Decca, 1964)
- Art Taylor, A.T.'s Delight (Blue Note, 1960)
- Mal Waldron, Sweet Love, Bitter (Impulse!, 1967)
