= No 'Count =

Studio album by Frank Foster
- Released: 1956
- Recorded: March 5 and 7, 1956
- Studio: Van Gelder Studio, Hackensack, New Jersey
- Genre: Jazz
- Length: 35:08
- Label: Savoy; MG 12078
- Producer: Ozzie Cadena

Frank Foster chronology
Hope Meets Foster (1955)	No 'Count (1956)	Basie Is Our Boss (1962)

No 'Count is an album by saxophonist Frank Foster recorded in 1956 and released on the Savoy label.

== Reception ==
Professional ratings
Review scores
Source	Rating
Allmusic	3.5/5 stars

Allmusic reviewer by Jim Todd stating, "the four horns carved out from the Count Basie band for this Frank Foster-led date get along just fine with drummer Kenny Clarke, bassist Eddie Jones, and guitarist Kenny Burrell. The set is a companion to Frank Wess' North, South, East....Wess, recorded by the same players at the same sessions. No Count, however, stays closer to Kansas City swing than the Wess release ... Foster's charts provide for lots of interplay and counterpoint between the two trombones and two tenors".

== Track listing ==
All compositions by Frank Foster except where noted

1. "Stop Gap" – 6:01
2. "Excursion" – 5:13
3. "Casa de Marcel" – 6:31
4. "Apron Strings" – 3:35
5. "Alternative" – 8:56
6. "Serenata" (Leroy Anderson) – 4:52

Recorded at Van Gelder Studio, Hackensack, New Jersey on March 5, 1956 (tracks 1, 5 & 6) and March 7, 1956 (tracks 2–4)

== Personnel ==
- Frank Foster – tenor saxophone
- Henry Coker, Benny Powell – trombone
- Frank Wess – tenor saxophone, flute
- Kenny Burrell – guitar
- Eddie Jones - bass
- Kenny Clarke - drums
