= This Is Billy Mitchell =

Studio album by Billy Mitchell
- Released: 1962
- Recorded: October 29–30, 1962
- Studios: Universal Studios, Chicago, IL
- Genre: Jazz
- Length: 35:07
- Labels: Smash; MGS-27027 / SRS-67027

Billy Mitchell chronology
Snap Your Fingers (1962)	This Is Billy Mitchell (1962)	Night Song (1962)

This Is Billy Mitchell is an album by saxophonist Billy Mitchell, released in 1962 on Smash Records.

== Reception ==
Professional ratings
Review scores
Source	Rating
Allmusic	3/5 stars

The Allmusic review by Scott Yanow stated, "Although the tenor saxophonist is in typically fine form on six obscurities and two standards, this record's main significance is that it features the young vibraphonist Bobby Hutcherson, who was virtually at the beginning of his career. ... Mainstream hard bop of the era".

== Track listing ==
1. "J & B" (Billy Mitchell) – 4:14
2. "Sophisticated Lady" (Duke Ellington, Irving Mills, Mitchell Parish) – 3:25
3. "You Turned the Tables on Me" (Louis Alter, Sidney Mitchell) – 5:41
4. "Passionova" (John Hines) – 4:47
5. "Tamra" (Billy Wallace) – 3:53
6. "Automation" (Dave Burns) – 6:48
7. "Just Waiting" (Melba Liston) – 2:46
8. "Siam" (Gene Kee) – 5:27

== Personnel ==
- Billy Mitchell – tenor saxophone
- Dave Burns – trumpet (tracks 3–6 & 8)
- Bobby Hutcherson – vibraphone
- Clarence "Sleepy" Anderson – organ (tracks 1, 2 & 7)
- Billy Wallace – piano (tracks 3–6 & 8)
- Herman Wright – bass
- Otis "Candy" Finch – drums
