= Billy Mitchell (saxophonist) =

American jazz musician (1926–2001)

William Melvin Mitchell (November 3, 1926 – April 18, 2001) was an American jazz tenor saxophonist.

== Career ==
Mitchell was born in Kansas City, Missouri, United States. He and his family moved to Detroit, where he received early music education at Cass Tech. He was known for his close association with trumpeter Thad Jones, who was also from Detroit, and worked in several big bands, including Woody Herman's when he replaced Gene Ammons. In 1949, Mitchell recorded with the Milt Buckner band, as well as making several recordings with Thad Jones.

From 1951 to 1954, Mitchell led the house band at the Blue Bird Inn in Detroit. The band operated in different configurations, including with drummer Oliver Jackson and his bassist brother Ali; as a quartet with Terry Pollard, Beans Richardson, and Elvin Jones; as a quintet including Thad Jones; and, for several months in 1953, with Miles Davis as a guest soloist.

From 1956 to 1957, he played with Dizzy Gillespie in his big band. From 1957 until 1961, and from 1966 to 1967, Mitchell played with Count Basie. In the early 1960s, he co-led a group with Al Grey, The Al Grey Billy Mitchell Sextet, which won the Down Beat magazine new band award in 1962. Mitchell performed and recorded with the Kenny Clarke/Francy Boland Big Band in Europe in the late 1960s and early 1970s. He was musical director for Stevie Wonder for a short time during this period. From the mid-1970s, through 1997, he led his own quartet at the Long Island NY jazz club Sonny's Place.

He died in Rockville Centre in 2001 of lung cancer at the age of 74.

He is not to be confused with Billy Mitchell, the jazz pianist and keyboardist, whose career was with Optimism Records in the 1980s.

== Discography ==
=== As leader ===
- This Is Billy Mitchell (Smash, 1962)
- A Little Juicy (Smash, 1964)
- Now's the Time (Catalyst, 1976)
- The Colossus of Detroit (Xanadu, 1978)
- De Lawd's Blues (Xanadu, 1980)

With Al Cohn

- Xanadu in Africa (Xanadu, 1981)
- Night Flight to Dakar (Xanadu, 1982)

With Al Grey

- Dizzy Atmosphere (Specialty, 1957)
- Motor City Scene (United Artists, 1959)
- The Last of the Big Plungers (Argo, 1960)
- The Thinking Man's Trombone (Argo, 1961)
- The Al Grey - Billy Mitchell Sextet (Argo, 1962)
- Snap Your Fingers (Argo, 1962)
- Night Song (Argo, 1963)

=== As sideman ===
With Count Basie

- Basie Plays Hefti (Roulette, 1958)
- Sing Along with Basie (Roulette, 1958)
- Basie One More Time (Roulette, 1959)
- Breakfast Dance and Barbecue (Roulette, 1959)
- Strike Up the Band (Roulette, 1959)
- Chairman of the Board (Roulette, 1959)
- Everyday I Have the Blues (Roulette, 1959)
- Dance Along with Basie (Roulette, 1959)
- Not Now, I'll Tell You When (Roulette, 1960)
- The Count Basie Story (Roulette, 1960)
- Kansas City Suite (Roulette, 1960)
- Count Basie/Sarah Vaughan (Roulette, 1961)
- Back with Basie (Roulette, 1962)
- Basie's Beat (Verve, 1967)

With the Kenny Clarke/Francy Boland Big Band

- Handle with Care (Atlantic, 1963)
- Now Hear Our Meanin' (CBS, 1966)
- Off Limits (Polydor, 1971)
- November Girl (Black Lion, 1976) with Carmen McRae

With Dizzy Gillespie

- World Statesman (Norgran, 1956)
- Dizzy Gillespie at Newport (Verve, 1957)
- Birks' Works (Verve, 1958)
- Dizzy in Greece (Verve, 1979)

With Milt Jackson

- Meet Milt Jackson (Savoy, 1949)
- Roll 'Em Bags (Savoy, 1949)
- Soul Brothers with Ray Charles (Atlantic, 1958)

With others

- Ernestine Anderson, Moanin' Moanin' Moanin' (Mercury, 1960)
- Tony Bennett, In Person! (Columbia, 1958)
- Dave Burns, Warming Up! (Vanguard, 1964)
- Paul Chambers, Tommy Flanagan, Motor City Scene (Lone Hill, 2004)
- Dolo Coker, Anniversary (Xanadu, 1985)
- Nat King Cole, Welcome to the Club (Capitol, 1959)
- Sammy Davis Jr., I Gotta Right to Swing (Brunswick, 1960)
- Duke Ellington, Count Basie, First Time! The Count Meets the Duke (Columbia, 1971)
- Jimmy Heath, Little Man Big Band (Verve, 1992)
- Jon Hendricks, Fast Livin' Blues (Columbia, 1962)
- Bobby Hutcherson, The Al Grey & Dave Burns Sessions (Lone Hill, 2004)
- Eddie Jefferson, Things Are Getting Better (Muse, 1974)
- Thad Jones, Detroit-New York Junction (Blue Note, 1956)
- Thad Jones, The Magnificent Thad Jones (Blue Note, 1956)
- Leiber-Stoller Big Band, Yakety Yak (Atlantic, 1960)
- Percy Mayfield, Weakness Is A Thing Called Man (RCA Victor, 1970)
- Jimmy McGriff, The Big Band (Solid State, 1966)
- Martin Mull, Normal (Capricorn, 1974)
- Pony Poindexter, Pony's Express (Epic, 1962)
- Bernard Purdie, Stand by Me (Whatcha See Is Whatcha Get) (Mega, 1971)
- Mel Torme, Night at the Concord Pavilion (Concord 1990)
- Sarah Vaughan, No Count Sarah (Mercury, 1959)
- Ernie Wilkins, Hard Mother Blues (Mainstream, 1970)
- Ernie Wilkins, Screaming Mothers (Mainstream, 1974)
- Joe Williams, Everyday I Have the Blues (Roulette, 1979)
- Frank Vignola, Appel Direct (Concord Jazz, 1993)
- Frank Wess Harry Edison Orchestra, Dear Mr. Basie (Concord Jazz, 1990)
- Frank Wess, Entre Nous (Concord Jazz, 1991)
