= Snap Your Fingers (album) =

Studio album / Live album by Al Grey featuring Billy Mitchell
- Released: 1962
- Recorded: January 31 and February 19, 1962
- Venue: Birdland, NYC
- Studio: Ter-Mar Studios, Chicago, IL
- Genre: Jazz
- Length: 41:28
- Label: Argo; LP-700
- Producer: Ralph Bass

Al Grey chronology
The Al Grey - Billy Mitchell Sextet (1961)	Snap Your Fingers (1962)	Night Song (1962)

Billy Mitchell chronology
The Al Grey - Billy Mitchell Sextet (1961)	Snap Your Fingers (1962)	This Is Billy Mitchell (1962)

Snap Your Fingers is an album by trombonist Al Grey released in 1962 on Argo Records featuring studio and live recordings.

== Reception ==
Professional ratings
Review scores
Source	Rating
Allmusic	4/5 stars
The Penguin Guide to Jazz Recordings	3/4 stars

The Allmusic review by Ken Dryden stated "Trombonist Al Grey is joined by emerging young tenor saxophonist Billy Mitchell on this pair of 1962 sessions ... There's not a bad track on this".

== Track listing ==
1. "Nothing But the Truth" (Billy Bowen) – 3:20
2. "Three-Fourth Blues" (Gene Kee) – 5:23
3. "Just Waiting" (Melba Liston) – 2:57
4. "R. B. Q." (Kee) – 4:58
5. "Green Dolphin Street" (Bronisław Kaper, Ned Washington) – 4:19
6. "Minor on Top" (Thad Jones) – 6:50
7. "African Lady" (Randy Weston) – 4:29
8. "Hi-Fly" (Weston) – 9:22
- Recorded at Birdland, NYC on January 31, 1962 (tracks 6–8) and Ter-Mar Studios, Chicago, IL on February 19, 1962 (tracks 1–5)

== Personnel ==
- Al Grey – trombone
- Billy Mitchell – tenor saxophone
- David Burns (tracks 1–5), Donald Byrd (tracks 6–8) – trumpet
- Bobby Hutcherson – vibraphone
- Herbie Hancock (tracks 6–8), Floyd Morris (tracks 1–5) – piano
- Herman Wright – bass
- Eddie Williams – drums
