= Al Grey =

American jazz trombonist (1925–2000)

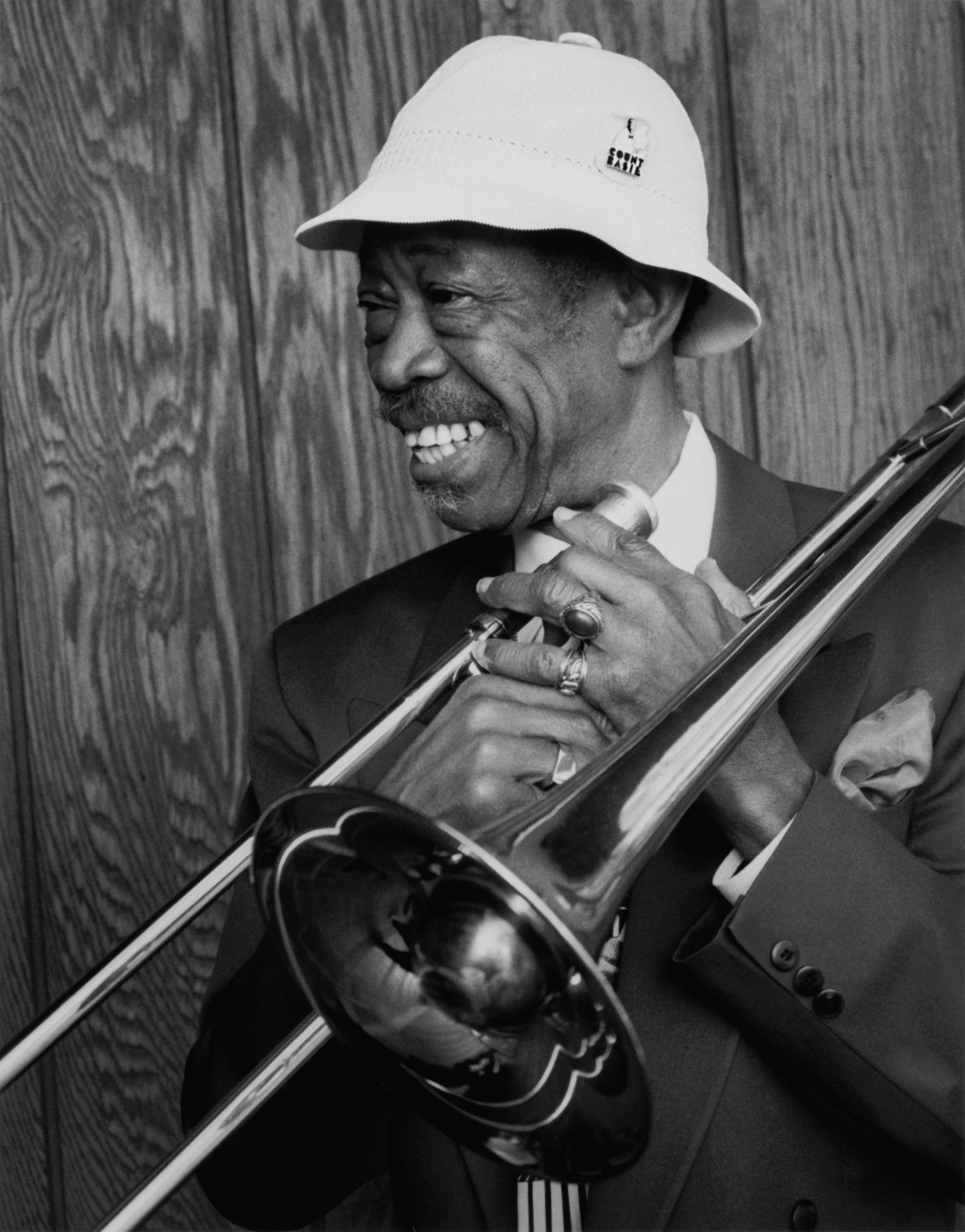
- Al Grey, 1980s

Background information
- Born: Albert Thornton Grey; June 6, 1925; Aldie, Virginia, U.S.
- Died: March 24, 2000 (aged 74) Scottsdale, Arizona, U.S.
- Genre: Jazz
- Occupation: Musician
- Instrument: Trombone
- Years active: 1946–1990
- Labels: Argo; Black & Blue; Tangerine; Chiaroscuro; Arbors; Columbia

Albert Thornton "Al" Grey (June 6, 1925 – March 24, 2000) was an American jazz trombonist who was a member of the Count Basie Orchestra. He was known for his plunger mute technique and wrote an instructional book in 1987 called Plunger Techniques.

== Career ==
Al Grey was born in Aldie, Virginia, United States, and grew up in Pottstown, Pennsylvania. He was introduced to the trombone at the age of four, playing in a band called the Goodwill Boys, which was led by his father. During World War II, he served in the U.S. Navy, where he continued to play the trombone. Soon after his discharge, he joined Benny Carter's band, then the bands of Jimmie Lunceford, Lucky Millinder, and Lionel Hampton. In the 1950s, he was a member in the big bands of Dizzy Gillespie and Count Basie. He led bands in the 1960s with Billy Mitchell and Jimmy Forrest. Later in life, he recorded with Clark Terry and J. J. Johnson. He made thirty recordings under his own name and another seventy with bands.

Grey's early trombone style was inspired by Trummy Young. He developed a wild, strong, and full sound. Solos often consisted of short, pronounced phrases with precisely timed syncopation. However, when playing with the plunger, he would produce the most mellow fill-ins and shape melodic answers to the lead voice. This aspect of his playing can be heard to great effect in response to Bing Crosby's vocals on the 1972 album Bing 'n' Basie.

He died in Scottsdale, Arizona, at the age of 74, after suffering from several ailments, including diabetes.

== Discography ==
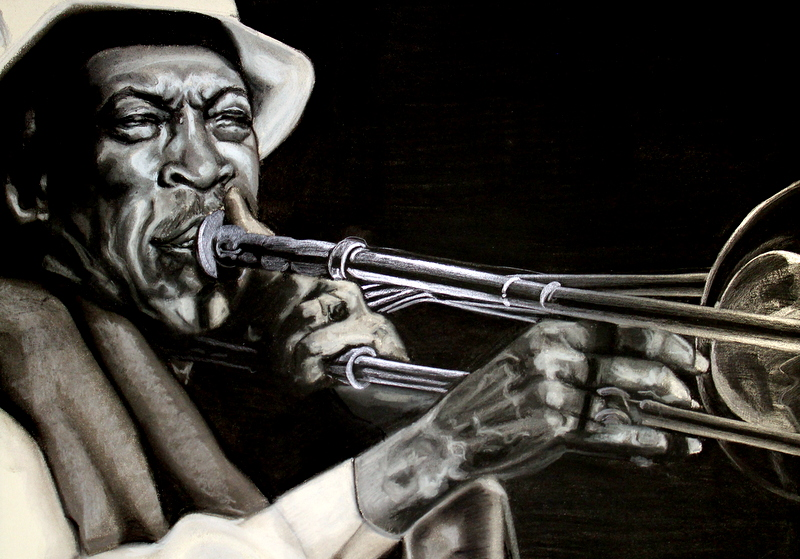
Al Grey, the Last Great Big Time Plunger, charcoal illustration by Gwendolyn Lanier-Gardner, 2015

=== As leader/co-leader ===
- Dizzy Atmosphere (Specialty, 1957)
- The Last of the Big Plungers (Argo 1960)
- The Thinking Man's Trombone (Argo, 1961)
- The Al Grey – Billy Mitchell Sextet (Argo, 1962)
- Snap Your Fingers (Argo, 1962)
- Having a Ball (Argo, 1963)
- Boss Bone (Argo, 1964)
- Night Song (Argo, 1963)
- Shades of Grey (Tangerine, 1965)
- Grey's Mood (Black & Blue, 1979)
- Get It Together (Pizza Express, 1979)
- O.D. (Out 'Dere) with Jimmy Forrest (Greyforrest, 1980)
- Struttin' and Shoutin' (Columbia, 1983)
- Things Are Getting Better All the Time with J. J. Johnson (Pablo, 1984)
- Just Jazz with Buddy Tate (Uptown, 1984)
- Al Grey & Jesper Thilo Quintet (Storyville, 1986)
- Al Grey Featuring Arnett Cobb and Jimmy Forrest (Black & Blue, 1987)
- The New Al Grey Quintet (Chiaroscuro, 1988)
- Al Grey Fab (Capri, 1990)
- Live at the Floating Jazz Festival (Chiaroscuro, 1991)
- Christmas Stockin' Stuffer (Capri, 1992)
- Truly Wonderful with Jimmy Forrest (Stash, 1992)
- Centerpiece: Live at the Blue Note (Telarc, 1995)
- Me 'n' Jack (Pullen Music, 1996)
- Matzoh and Grits (Arbors, 1998)

=== As sideman ===
With Count Basie

- The Atomic Mr. Basie (Roulette, 1957)
- Basie Plays Hefti (Roulette, 1958)
- Basie (Roulette, 1958)
- Breakfast Dance and Barbecue (Roulette, 1959)
- Basie One More Time (Roulette, 1959)
- Chairman of the Board (Roulette, 1959)
- Strike Up the Band (Roulette, 1959)
- Dance Along with Basie (Roulette, 1959)
- Kansas City Suite (Roulette, 1961)
- Count Basie/Sarah Vaughan (Roulette, 1961)
- Easin' It (Roulette, 1963)
- Basie Picks the Winners (Verve, 1965)
- Pop Goes the Basie (Reprise, 1965)
- Big Band Scene '65 (Roulette, 1965)
- Basie Swingin' Voices Singin' (ABC-Paramount, 1966)
- Basie Meets Bond (United Artists, 1966)
- Arthur Prysock/Count Basie (Verve, 1966)
- Broadway Basie's...Way (Command, 1966)
- Have a Nice Day (Daybreak, 1971)
- Bing 'n' Basie (20th Century Fox, 1972)
- Count Basie Plays Quincy Jones & Neal Hefti (Roulette, 1975)
- Basie Big Band (Pablo, 1975)
- I Told You So (Pablo, 1976)
- Montreux '77 (Pablo, 1977)
- Prime Time (Pablo, 1977)
- Basie Jam #2 (Pablo, 1977)
- Basie/Eckstine Incorporated (Roulette, 1979)
- Basie Jam #3 (Pablo, 1979)
- Count On the Coast (Phontastic, 1983)
- Count On the Coast Vol. II (Phontastic, 1984)
- Autumn in Paris (Magic, 1984)
- Count On the Coast '58 (Polydor, 1985)
- Live in Stockholm (Magic, 1985)
- Loose Walk (Pablo, 1988)
- Basie in Europe (LRC, 1985)

With Clarence "Gatemouth" Brown

- San Antonio Ballbuster (Red Lightnin', 1974)
- Atomic Energy (Blues Boy, 1983)
- More Stuff (Black and Blue, 1985)
- Pressure Cooker (Alligator, 1985)

With Ray Charles

- The Genius of Ray Charles (Atlantic, 1959)
- Genius + Soul = Jazz (Impulse!, 1961)
- At the Club (Philips, 1966)

With Dizzy Gillespie

- Dizzy Gillespie at Newport (Verve, 1957)
- Dizzy in Greece (Verve, 1957)
- Birks' Works (Verve, 1958)

With Lionel Hampton

- Newport Uproar! (RCA Victor, 1968)
- Hamp's Big Band Live! (Glad-Hamp, 1979)
- Live at the Blue Note (Telarc, 1991)

With Jon Hendricks

- Fast Livin' Blues (Columbia, 1962)
- Freddie Freeloader (Denon, 1990)
- Boppin' at the Blue Note (Telarc, 1995)

With Quincy Jones

- Golden Boy (Mercury, 1964)
- Gula Matari (A&M, 1970)
- I Heard That!! (A&M, 1976)
- Quincy Jones Talkin' Verve (Verve, 2001)

With Oscar Pettiford

- The Oscar Pettiford Orchestra in Hi-Fi Volume Two (ABC-Paramount, 1958)
- In Memoriam Oscar Pettiford (Philips, 1963)
- Deep Passion (GRP Impulse!, 1994)

With Clark Terry

- Squeeze Me! (Chiaroscuro, 1989)
- What a Wonderful World (Red Baron, 1993)
- Shades of Blues (Challenge, 1994)

With others

- Lorez Alexandria, Early in the Morning (Argo, 1960)
- Ernestine Anderson, Moanin' (Mercury, 1960)
- Louis Armstrong, Louis Armstrong and His Friends (Flying Dutchman, 1970)
- Tony Bennett, Sings Ellington Hot & Cool, (Columbia, 1999)
- Ray Brown, Don't Forget the Blues (Concord Jazz, 1986)
- Ray Bryant, Madison Time (Columbia, 1960)
- Dave Burns, Warming Up! (Vanguard, 1964)
- Joe Bushkin, Play It Again Joe (United Artists, 1977)
- Arnett Cobb, Keep On Pushin' (Bee Hive, 1984)
- Nat King Cole, Welcome to the Club (Capitol, 1959)
- Chris Connor, Sings Ballads of the Sad Cafe (Atlantic, 1959)
- Eddie "Lockjaw" Davis, Jazz at the Philharmonic 1983 (Pablo, 1983)
- Sammy Davis Jr., I Gotta Right to Swing (Brunswick, 1960)
- Buddy DeFranco, Born to Swing! Star (Satelite, 1988)
- Billy Eckstine, Mr. B (Audio Lab, 1960)
- Duke Ellington, Digital Duke (GRP, 1987)
- Ella Fitzgerald, Sweet and Hot (Decca, 1955)
- Ella Fitzgerald, Newport Jazz Festival Live at Carnegie Hall July 5, 1973 (CBS, 1973)
- Dexter Gordon, Settin' the Pace (Proper, 2001)
- Dave Grusin, The Fabulous Baker Boys (GRP, 1989)
- John Hicks, Friends Old and New (Novus, 1992)
- Johnny Hodges, 3 Shades of Blue (Flying Dutchman, 1970)
- Bobby Hutcherson, The Al Grey & Dave Burns Sessions (Lone Hill Jazz, 2004)
- J. J. Johnson, Things Are Getting Better All the Time (Pablo, 1984)
- Leiber-Stoller Big Band, Yakety Yak (Atlantic, 1960)
- Melba Liston, Melba Liston and Her 'Bones (MetroJazz, 1959)
- Jimmy McGriff, Blue to the 'Bone (Milestone, 1988)
- Jay McShann, Some Blues (Chiaroscuro, 1993)
- Lee Morgan/Thad Jones, Minor Strain (Roulette/Capitol, 1990)
- Barbara Morrison, I Know How to Do It (Chartmaker, 1996)
- Joe Newman, Counting Five in Sweden (Metronome, 1958)
- Johnny Pate, Outrageous (MGM, 1970)
- Pony Poindexter, Gumbo! (Prestige, 1963)
- Paul Quinichette, Like Basie! (United Artists, 1959)
- Dianne Reeves, The Grand Encounter (Blue Note, 1996)
- Annie Ross, Music Is Forever (DRG, 1996)
- Buddy Tate, Al Grey, Just Jazz (Reservoir, 1989)
- Leon Thomas, Facets (Flying Dutchman, 1973)
- Mel Torme, Night at the Concord Pavilion (Concord, 1990)
- Robert Trowers, Point of View (Concord, 1995)
- Sarah Vaughan, No Count Sarah (Mercury, 1959)
- Eddie Cleanhead Vinson, Kidney Stew (Black and Blue, 1996)
- George Wein, Swing That Music (Columbia, 1993)
- Frank Wess, Harry Edison, Dear Mr. Basie (Concord Jazz, 1990)
- Randy Weston', Tanjah (Polydor, 1973)
- Ernie Wilkins, Here Comes the Swingin' Mr. Wilkins! (Everest, 1960)
- Joe Williams, Everyday I Have the Blues (Roulette, 1959)
- Joe Williams, Sing Along with Basie (Roulette, 1980)
