= The Count's Men =

Studio album by Joe Newman
- Released: 1955
- Recorded: September 1955; New York City
- Genre: Jazz
- Label: Jazztone; J-1220
- Producer: George T. Simon

Joe Newman chronology
All I Wanna Do Is Swing (1955)	The Count's Men (1955)	I'm Still Swinging (1955)

The Count's Men (also released as Swing Lightly) is an album by alumni of the Count Basie Orchestra led by jazz trumpeter Joe Newman and recorded in 1955 for the mail order Jazztone label.

== Reception ==
Professional ratings
Review scores
Source	Rating
Allmusic	3/5 stars
The Penguin Guide to Jazz Recordings	4/4 stars

Allmusic awarded the album 3 stars.

== Track listing ==
1. "The Sidewalks of New York" (James W. Blake, Charles B. Lawlor) - 5:40
2. "Careless Love" (W. C. Handy) - 8:41
3. "Jumpin' at the Woodside" (Count Basie) - 7:16
4. "Casey Jones" (Eddie Newton, T. Lawrence Seibert) - 4:52
5. "The Midgets" (Joe Newman) - 3:30
6. "Alone In The Night" (Judy Spencer) - 5:00
7. "A. M. Romp" (Ernie Wilkins, Joe Newman) - 10:06
8. "Annie Laurie" (Traditional - 6:58
9. "Frankie and Johnnie" (Traditional) - 7:12 Bonus track on CD reissue

== Personnel ==
- Joe Newman- trumpet
- Benny Powell - trombone
- Frank Wess - flute, tenor saxophone
- Frank Foster - tenor saxophone
- Sir Charles Thompson - piano
- Eddie Jones - bass
- Shadow Wilson - drums
- Ernie Wilkins - arranger
