= Nine Flags =

Studio album by Chico O'Farrill
- Released: 1966
- Recorded: November 10, 11 & 14, 1966
- Genre: Jazz
- Length: 35:17
- Label: Impulse!
- Producer: Bob Thiele

Chico O'Farrill chronology
Spanish Rice (1966)	Nine Flags (1966)	Married Well (1967)

Nine Flags is an album by Cuban composer-arranger Chico O'Farrill featuring performances recorded in 1966 for the Impulse! label.

== Reception ==
The Allmusic review by Scott Yanow awarded the album 3 stars stating "The overall music is quite different from O'Farrill's usual Afro-Cuban jazz outings... None of the individual songs caught on, and the interpretations are usually quite concise, but this LP (which has not yet been reissued) is generally quite fun".

Professional ratings
Review scores
Source	Rating
Allmusic	3/5 stars

== Track listing ==
All compositions by Chico O'Farrill

1. "Live Oak" - 2:41
2. "Patcham" - 4:01
3. "Aromatic Tabac" - 4:17
4. "Dry Citrus" - 3:30
5. "Royal Saddle" - 2:42
6. "Panache" - 2:45
7. "Green Moss" - 4:30
8. "Manzanilla" - 4:23
9. "Clear Spruce" - 3:28
10. "The Lady From Nine Flags" - 3:00

- Recorded in New York City on November 10, 1966 (tracks 2, 3 & 8), November 11, 1966 (tracks 1, 5, 6, & 10) and November 14, 1966 (tracks 4, 7 & 9)

== Personnel ==
- Chico O'Farrill - arranger, conductor
- Clark Terry - trumpet, flugelhorn
- Art Farmer (tracks 1–3, 5, 6, 8 & 10), Bernie Glow (tracks 1, 5, 6, & 10), Jimmy Nottingham (tracks 1, 5, 6, & 10) - trumpet
- Harry DiVito (tracks 1, 5, 6, & 10), Urbie Green (tracks 1, 5, 6, & 10), J. J. Johnson (tracks 2–4 & 7–9), Benny Powell (tracks 1, 5, 6, & 10) - trombone
- Julius Watkins - french horn (tracks 1–3, 5, 6, 8 & 10)
- Jerry Dodgion (tracks 1, 5, 6, & 10), Joe Firrantello (tracks 1–3, 5, 6, 8 & 10), Eddie Wasserman (tracks 1, 5, 6, & 10), Frank Wess (tracks 1, 5, 6, & 10) - woodwinds
- Seldon Powell - tenor saxophone (tracks 2–4 & 7–9)
- Larry Coryell - guitar (tracks 4, 7 & 9)
- Pat Rebillot - piano (tracks 2–4 & 7–9)
- George Duvivier - bass
- Gus Johnson (tracks 4, 7 & 9), Don Lamond (tracks 1, 5, 6, & 10), Mel Lewis (tracks 2, 3 & 8) - drums
- Carl Hard - percussion (tracks 2, 3 & 8)
