= Frank Wess =

American jazz saxophonist & flautist (1922–2013)

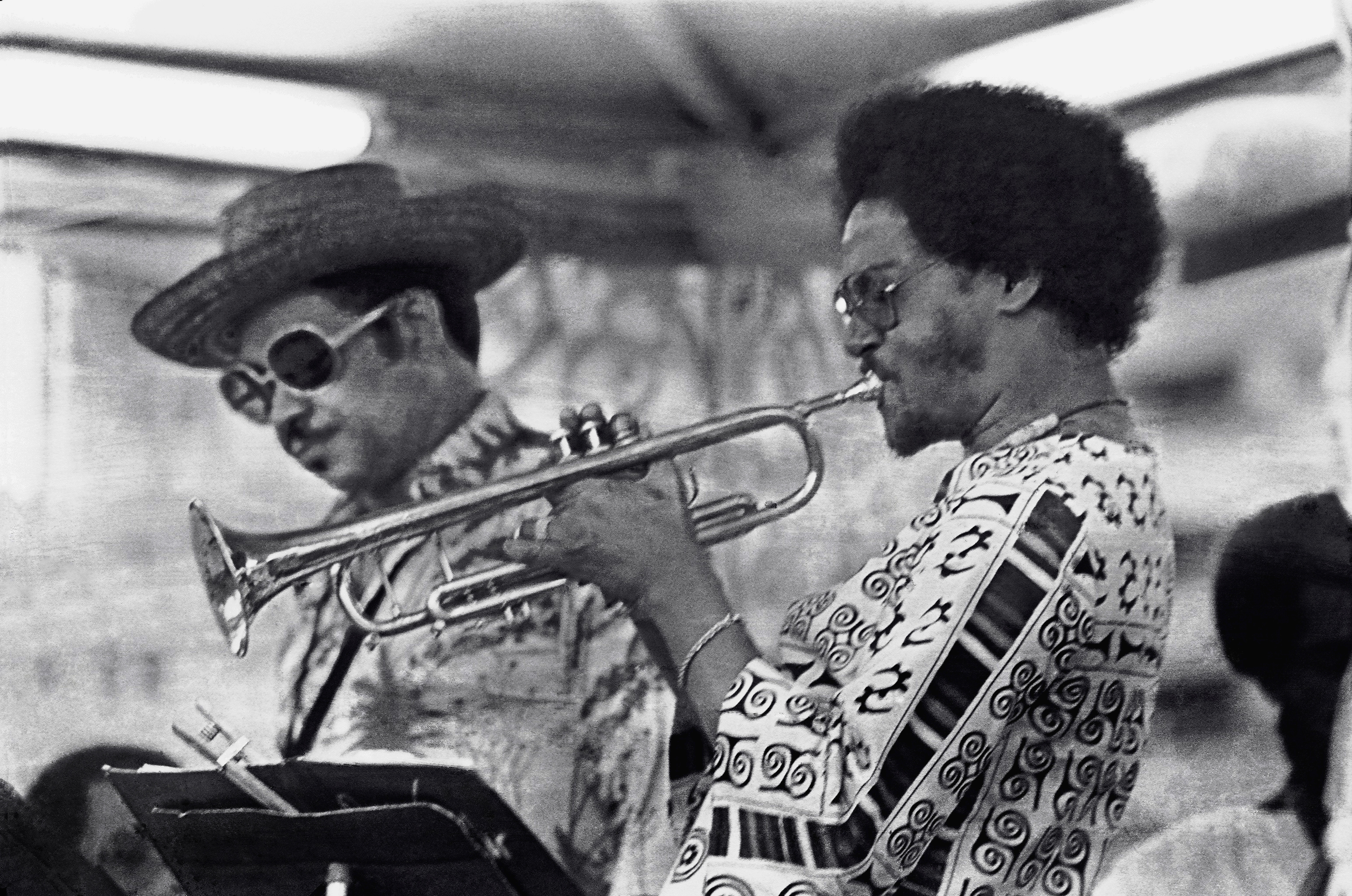
- Frank Wess (left) with Jimmy Owens, 1977

Background information
- Born: Frank Wellington Wess; January 4, 1922; Kansas City, Missouri, U.S.
- Died: October 30, 2013 (aged 91) New York City, U.S.
- Genre: Jazz
- Occupation: Musician
- Instruments: Tenor saxophone; alto saxophone; flute
- Years active: 1950s–2013
- Labels: Commodore; Savoy; Pablo; Progressive; Concord

Frank Wellington Wess (January 4, 1922 – October 30, 2013) was an American jazz saxophonist and flautist. He was renowned for his extensive solo work; however, he was also remembered for his time playing with Count Basie's band during the early 1950s into the early 1960s. Critic Scott Yanow described him as one of the premier proteges of Lester Young, and a leading jazz flautist of his era—using the latter instrument to bring new colors to Basie's music.

== Early life ==
Wess was born in Kansas City, Missouri. Since he was young, Wess grew up listening to music. His mother was one of his major influences as she would take him to watch performers like Roland Hayes and Ida Cox. While speaking to his father, who was a school principal in Oklahoma, on a separate occasion, he discovered that his mother had wanted him to become a musician for a long time. Up until that pivotal moment, Wess had viewed his interactions with his mother as bonding where she emphasized the importance of being aware of culture. Before realizing that jazz was his calling, he had other interests. To name a few, Wess aspired to be a cabinetmaker and then a dentist.

Wess grew up loving the saxophone, specifically the tenor and alto saxophone. He had asked his mother for one since he was young, and she would always tell him, "Wait till you're ten years old." He believed that this life truly started when he turned ten years old as that marked the start of his lengthy music career. Wess was drawn to the instrument as it was "closely related to the human voice." In his eyes, the saxophone was an instrument that was relatively easy to learn, but difficult to master. In an interview with the National Endowment for the Arts, he said, "...if you can play it, it sounds good, you know. Lots of instruments, you put a whole lot into it and it still doesn't sound too good." When he began playing the saxophone, he took influence from the sound of the horn.

Wess began with classical music training and played in Oklahoma in high school. He would travel around with the All-State High School Orchestra to perform. In 1935, Wess and his family moved to Washington, D.C. At this time, he had not been playing any longer as burnout had gotten the best of him, causing him to grow "tired of the music." Having that significant change in scenery revitalized and rekindled Wess's passion for playing music. During lunch time at his high school, students would host jam sessions in the orchestra. Billy Taylor was a student at his high school during that period of time. These sessions lit up that spark in Wess that made him start playing again. He experienced a shift in preferences as he opted to begin playing jazz. To be more specific, he played a big band style of jazz.

Living in Washington, D.C., put him in proximity to Baltimore, Maryland, a city that marked a turning point in his young career. During the summer of 1938, Wess performed at a club in Baltimore with a group called the Hardy Brothers. He had two opening numbers in the same week, which gave him a boost of confidence. The next week, he performed another opening number at the Royal Theater, which only gave him more confidence to keep going.

== World War II and the 1940s ==
In 1941, Wess became a member of the U.S. Army. His ROTC bandleader had been recruiting eligible young people who could play music professionally. He would serve as an assistant bandleader that played a variety of music, including Viennese waltzes, vaudeville, classical, and marches. It was a 17-piece swing band, and they were sent to Africa in 1942. During that tour, they performed in Dakar, Casablanca, Monrovia, Tlemcen, and Algiers. During their first gig, they played for a group of Americans, Germans, and British. The highlight of Wess's time with the Army Band was accompanying Josephine Baker on tours for Allied troops.

Shortly upon returning from his time in the Army in 1944, Wess joined Billy Eckstine and his orchestra. They had known each other before Wess went off to the war. At one point, Wess went to go see Eckstine at the theater; during this interaction, Eckstine said, "look, my tenor player is going into the army. Come on with me." This interaction was fortunate for Wess, as this orchestra was legendary for being the first big band that played a new style of jazz known as bebop. Moreover, Billy Eckstine's Orchestra included pioneers for this new style of jazz: Fats Navarro, Miles Davis, Howard McGhee, Dexter Gordon, Gene Ammons, Leo Parker, Tommy Potter, and Art Blakely. However, this stint did not last for long, as the orchestra disbanded in 1947.

As a result of the disbanding of the Billy Eckstine Orchestra, Wess would proceed to play with the orchestras of Eddie Heywood, Lucky Millinder, and Bull Moose Jackson. Like with Eckstine, these stints were also short-lived, as by 1949, Wess burned out again from the stress of being on the road for so much time. In addition, he was fed up with the maltreatment from society during this time due to his race. As a result, Wess would move back to Washington, D.C., to enroll at the Modern School of Music in pursuit of a Bachelor's of Music degree. During this time, he rediscovered the flute. In high school, Wess's orchestra teacher gave him a flute, but he did not have anyone to teach him how to properly play it. However, this school had teachers from the National Symphony Orchestra, offering him a chance to learn the flute.

== Count Basie and the "New Testament" band ==
Because of Wess's time with Billy Eckstine, he had the opportunity to interact with Count Basie. Eckstine had recommended Wess to Basie, who tried recruiting Wess for several years. However, Wess consistently refused to join the band as he did not want to engage in long tours, which would force him to leave college – when, in the first place, he was attending college to expand his career options and avoid touring.

At the end of Wess's education, Basie called him and said he could help get Wess more exposure. Wess's only condition was that he needed a salary, and Basie agreed.

Wess played a pivotal role in the formation of Count Basie's orchestra as he recruited new musicians to the band: Thad Jones, Bill Hughes, Eddie Jones, Al Aarons, and Eric Dixon. Together, this group of legendary musicians formed Count Basie's "New Testament" band. Throughout the years, other musicians came and went. Wess's versatility as an artist allowed him to play the flute, alto saxophone, and tenor saxophone. Basie's leadership style was unorthodox as he never rehearsed with the band, but rather, he would just sit and listen. Wess and his fellow musicians were the ones who decided on the arrangements. However, this approach to leadership allowed Basie to be aware of everything. He would have an eye on everything and knew what was occurring in the musicians' personal lives. While many could not comprehend Basie's approach, this allowed the members of the band to truly get to know each other so they could stay around long enough so that it translated into cohesive music pieces.

During his time with Count Basie's band, Wess developed a close connection with Frank Foster. There was a lot of interplay between both of the musicians in the various performances, with the song "Two Franks" being their showpiece. Their collaboration and flourishing friendship displayed how Basie's leadership style had encouraged the musicians to form a deeper connection with each other.

When it came to instrumentation, Wess opted for the tenor saxophone and flute. This was critical in helping establish the swing in the orchestra's music, a component that Count Basie highly valued. For Wess, he felt that swing was important for anyone who wanted to play jazz. There had to be a constant pulse throughout the song. The musicians have to truly play together; they need to hear each other so that their instincts can help guide them on how to play next. Again, having that sort of connection points back to how Count Basie had led the band. In 1957, Wess willingly changed to playing the alto saxophone as the band had added Eddie "Lockjaw" Davis.

In 1964, Wess left Count Basie's band.

== Post–Count Basie ==
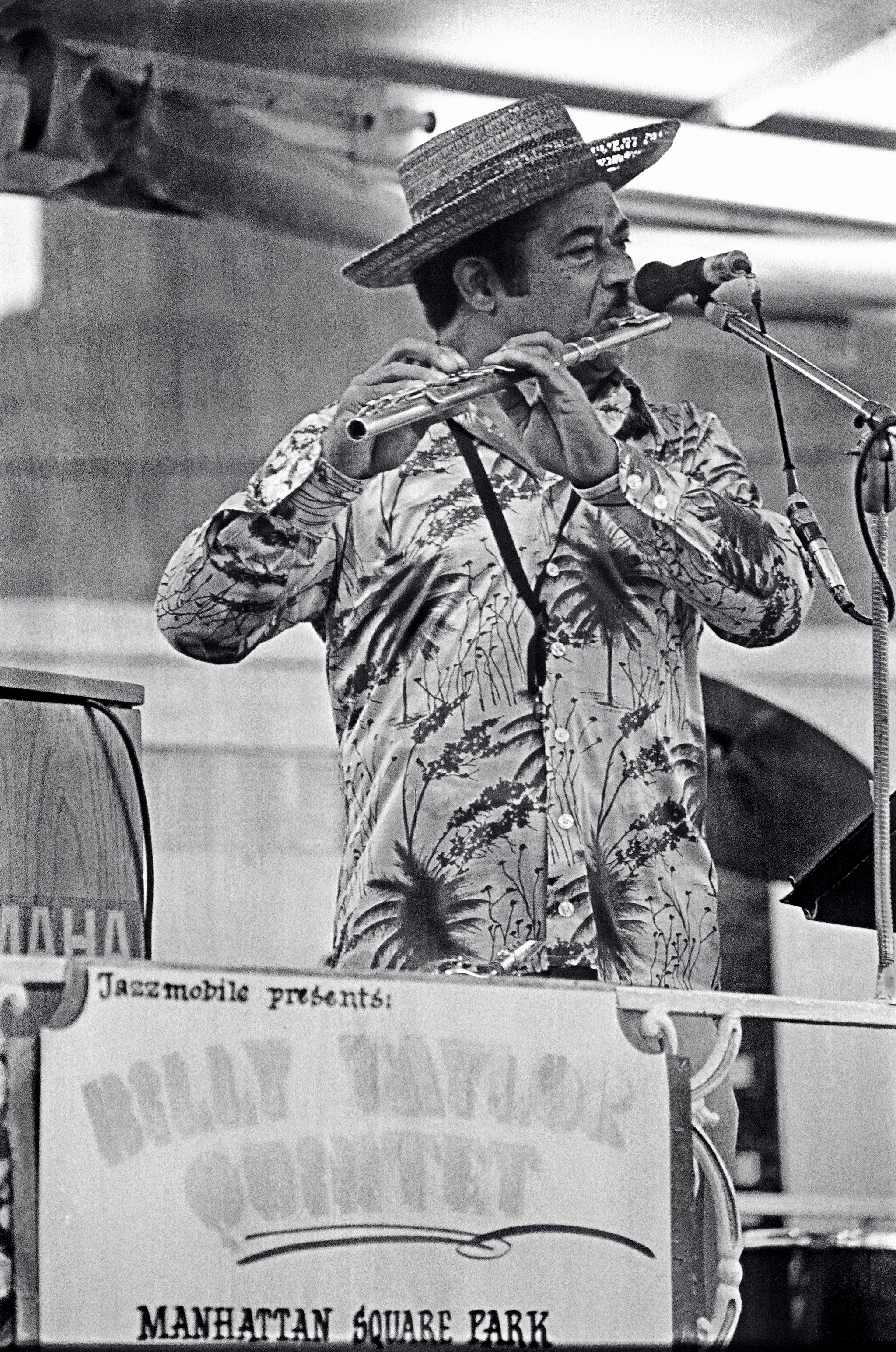
Wess with the Billy Taylor Quintet, presented by Jazzmobile, 1977

Following Wess's departure from the "New Testament" band, this marked a new stage in his career. He turned to Broadway and television as his next career path. For Broadway, Wess was a part of the pit bands for the shows Golden Boy, Chicago, Annie, and Sugar Babies. On television, he would play for The Dick Cavett Show, The David Frost Show, and The Sammy Davis Show, among others.

Wess continued to play outside of musicals and television shows. He became a sideman who was often in high demand by all sorts of musicians. It is estimated "that between 1964 and 2011, he participated in sessions with around 150 different artists or ensembles, from Benny Carter to Jaco Pastorius and from Annie Ross to Diana Ross." He was also a leader and co-leader for numerous sessions for the and Savoy record label. Often, he would actually record sessions with his former bandmates from his time with Count Basie, especially with Frank Foster. Together, they recorded two albums: Two for the Blues (1984) and Frankly Speaking (1985). Both utilized the tenor saxophone, but played with such contrasting styles. Foster utilized a more aggressive approach while Wess focused on sounding more lyrical.

Wess was a part of some additional partnerships. He was a key part of the New York Jazz Quartet, with pianist Roland Hanna, George Mraz or Ron Carter on the bass, and either Ben Riley, Richard Pratt, or Grady Tate on drums. Wess's key was to always find a venture to keep him occupied.

At the age of 89, Frank recorded an album named Magic 101. This album comprised seven songs played by Wess's quartet that included pianist Kenny Barron, bassist Kenny Davis, and drummer Winard Harper. Wess played the tenor saxophone throughout the song, showcasing a slower side of jazz.

The album began with the song "Say It Isn't So", that showcased the swing that Wess had built his legacy on during his time with Count Basie. The second song, "The Very Thought of You", was a stark contrast to how the program started as leaned towards a ballad. The third song, "Pretty Lady", and the fourth one, "Come Rain or Come Shine", go down the blues path as they focused more on raw emotion. The next song, "Easy Living", was a way of showing the late night in a city. The album then moves to "Blue Monk", to pick up the tempo and bring vibrancy to the atmosphere. Wess brought back a steady swing throughout the duration of this song. The album ends with Wess's solo saxophone rendition of Duke Ellington's "All Too Soon", where he created an intimate feeling for the listeners.

== Death ==
On October 30, 2013, at the age of 91, Wess died in a taxi on "his way to get a dialysis treatment", after suffering a sudden heart attack in the cab. He had still been playing music with his friends a month before his death, although his health had been in decline for months. His last public concert was in April of that year in New York at the 54 Below club. He was survived by his partner, Sara Tsutsumi, two daughters (Michele Kane and Francine Wess), two grandchildren, and four great-grandchildren.

Marc Loehrwald, a saxophone player, said that music had been Wess's life. He loved having the opportunity to play with other musicians, and he would try to invite young and moved musicians to his house for a jam session. Wess ensured that his legacy lived far beyond than the confines of his own family.

== Discography ==
=== As leader ===
- Flutes & Reeds (Savoy, 1955) with Ernie Wilkins
- North, South, East....Wess (Savoy, 1956)
- Opus in Swing (Savoy, 1956) with Kenny Burrell and Freddie Green
- Jazz for Playboys (Savoy, 1957) with Joe Newman, Kenny Burrell, and Freddie Green
- Wheelin' & Dealin' (Prestige, 1957) with John Coltrane
- Opus de Blues (Savoy, 1959 [1984]) – also released as I Hear Ya Talkin'
- The Frank Wess Quartet (Moodsville, 1960)
- Southern Comfort (Prestige, 1962)
- Yo Ho! Poor You, Little Me (Prestige, 1963)
- The Award Winner (Mainstream, 1964)
- Wess to Memphis (1970)
- Flute of the Loom (1973)
- Flute Juice (Progressive, 1981)
- Two at the Top (Uptown, 1983) with Johnny Coles
- Two for the Blues (Pablo, 1984) with Frank Foster
- Frankly Speaking (Concord Jazz, 1985) with Frank Foster
- Entre Nous (Concord, 1990)
- Going Wess (1993)
- Tryin' to Make My Blues Turn Green (Concord, 1994)
- Surprise, Surprise (Chiaroscuro, 1995)
- Hank and Frank (Lineage, 2002) with Hank Jones
- Hank and Frank II (Lineage, 2009) with Hank Jones
- Magic 101 (IPO, 2013)

With the New York Jazz Quartet

- In Concert in Japan (Salvation, 1975)
- Surge (Enja, 1977)
- Song of the Black Knight (Sonet, 1977)
- Blues for Sarka (Enja, 1978)
- The New York Jazz Quartet in Chicago (Bee Hive, 1981)
- Oasis (Enja, 1981)

=== As sideman ===
With Toshiko Akiyoshi
- Ten Gallon Shuffle (Victor/BMG, 1984)
- Wishing Peace (Ken [Japan], 1986)
- Carnegie Hall Concert (Columbia, 1992)

With Manny Albam

- The Soul of the City (Solid State, 1966)

With Lorez Alexandria

- Early in the Morning (Argo, 1960)

With Gene Ammons

- Velvet Soul (Prestige, 1960 [1964])
- Angel Eyes (Prestige, 1960 [1965])

With Dorothy Ashby

- The Jazz Harpist (Regent, 1957)
- Hip Harp (Prestige, 1958)
- In a Minor Groove (New Jazz, 1958)

With Count Basie

- Count Basie and the Kansas City 7 (Impulse!, 1962)

With Count Basie Orchestra

- Dance Session (Clef, 1953)
- Dance Session Album No. 2 (Clef, 1954)
- Basie (Clef, 1954)
- Count Basie Swings, Joe Williams Sings (Clef, 1955) with Joe Williams
- April in Paris (Verve, 1956)
- The Greatest!! Count Basie Plays, Joe Williams Sings Standards (Verve, 1956) with Joe Williams
- Metronome All-Stars 1956 (Clef, 1956) with Ella Fitzgerald and Joe Williams
- Hall of Fame (Verve, 1956 [1959])
- Basie in London (Verve, 1956)
- One O'Clock Jump (Verve, 1957)
- The Atomic Mr. Basie (Roulette, 1957) a.k.a. Basie or E=MC^{2}
- Basie Plays Hefti (Roulette, 1958)
- Chairman of the Board (Roulette, 1958)
- Sing Along with Basie (Roulette, 1958) with Joe Williams and Lambert, Hendricks & Ross
- Basie One More Time (Roulette, 1959)
- Breakfast Dance and Barbecue (Roulette, 1959)
- Everyday I Have the Blues (Roulette, 1959)
- Dance Along with Basie (Roulette, 1959)
- String Along with Basie (Roulette, 1960)
- Not Now, I'll Tell You When (Roulette, 1960)
- The Count Basie Story (Roulette, 1960)
- Kansas City Suite (Roulette, 1960)
- First Time! The Count Meets the Duke (Columbia, 1961)
- The Legend (Roulette, 1961)
- Back with Basie (Roulette, 1962)
- Basie in Sweden (Roulette, 1962)
- On My Way & Shoutin' Again! (Verve, 1962)
- This Time by Basie! (Reprise, 1963)
- More Hits of the 50's and 60's (Verve, 1963)
- Ella and Basie! (Verve, 1963)

With Benny Carter

- Over the Rainbow (MusicMasters, 1989)
- Harlem Renaissance (MusicMasters, 1992)

With Ron Carter

- Parade (Milestone, 1979)
- Empire Jazz (RSO, 1980)

With Kenny Clarke

- Telefunken Blues (Savoy, 1955)

With Hank Crawford

- Mr. Blues Plays Lady Soul (Atlantic, 1969)

With Dameronia

- To Tadd with Love (Uptown, 1982)
- Look Stop Listen (Uptown, 1983)
- Live at the Theatre Boulogne-Billancourt Paris (Soul Note, 1989 [1994])

With Charles Earland

- Infant Eyes (Muse, 1979)

With Harry Edison

- Swing Summit (Candid, 1990)

With Frank Foster

- No 'Count (Savoy, 1956)

With Gene Harris

- It's the Real Soul (Concord, 1995)

With Johnny Hartman

- Once in Every Life (Bee Hive, 1980)

With Coleman Hawkins

- The Saxophone Section (World Wide, 1958)

With Johnny Hodges

- Blue Notes (Verve, 1966)
- Don't Sleep in the Subway (Verve, 1967)
- 3 Shades of Blue (Flying Dutchman, 1970)

With Bobby Hutcherson

- Conception: The Gift of Love (Columbia, 1979)

With Milt Jackson

- Meet Milt Jackson (Savoy, 1955)
- Opus de Jazz (Savoy, 1955)
- Bags & Flutes (Atlantic, 1957)

With J. J. Johnson

- Broadway Express (RCA Victor, 1965)

With Elvin Jones

- Elvin! (Riverside, 1961–62)
- And Then Again (Atlantic, 1965)
- Time Capsule (Vanguard, 1977)

With Etta Jones

- Etta Jones Sings (Roulette, 1965)

With Quincy Jones

- The Birth of a Band! (Mercury, 1959)
- Quincy Plays for Pussycats (Mercury, 1959–65 [1965])

With Thad Jones

- Olio (Prestige, 1957)
- After Hours (Prestige, 1957)

With Dick Katz

- In High Profile (Bee Hive, 1984)

With Yusef Lateef

- Part of the Search (Atlantic, 1973)

With Junior Mance

- I Believe to My Soul (Atlantic, 1968)

With Arif Mardin

- Journey (Atlantic, 1974)

With Les McCann

- Another Beginning (Atlantic, 1974)

With Jimmy McGriff

- The Big Band (Solid State, 1966)
- Straight Up (Milestone, 1998)

With Charles McPherson

- Today's Man (Mainstream, 1973)

With Helen Merrill

- You've Got a Date with the Blues (MetroJazz, 1959)

With Oliver Nelson

- The Spirit of '67 (Impulse!, 1967) with Pee Wee Russell

With David Newman

- The Weapon (Atlantic, 1973)

With Joe Newman

- The Count's Men (Jazztone, 1955)
- I Feel Like a Newman (Storyville, 1956)
- The Midgets (Vik, 1956)
- The Happy Cats (Coral, 1957)
- Counting Five in Sweden (Metronome, 1958)
- Jive at Five (Swingville, 1960)

With Chico O'Farrill

- Nine Flags (Impulse!, 1966)

With Houston Person

- Sweet Buns & Barbeque (Prestige, 1972)

With Buddy Rich

- The Wailing Buddy Rich (Norgran, 1955)

With A. K. Salim

- Flute Suite (Savoy, 1957) with Herbie Mann

With Woody Shaw

- Rosewood (Columbia, 1977)

With Zoot Sims

- Passion Flower: Zoot Sims Plays Duke Ellington (1979)

With Melvin Sparks

- Akilah! (Prestige, 1972)

With Leon Spencer

- Where I'm Coming From (Prestige, 1973)

With Dakota Staton

- I Want a Country Man (Groove Merchant, 1973)

With Billy Taylor

- Billy Taylor with Four Flutes (Riverside, 1959)
- Kwamina (Mercury, 1961)

With Earl Washington

- Earl Washington All-Stars (Workshop, 1962)

With Charles Williams

- Stickball (Mainstream, 1972)

With Gerald Wilson

- New York, New Sound (Mack Avenue, 2003)

With Lem Winchester

- Another Opus (New Jazz, 1960)
