= I'm Still Swinging =

Studio album by The Joe Newman Octet
- Released: 1956
- Recorded: October 3 & 4, 1955; Webster Hall, New York City
- Genre: Jazz
- Length: 37:33
- Label: RCA Victor; LPM 1198
- Producer: Jack Lewis

Joe Newman chronology
The Count's Men (1955)	I'm Still Swinging (1956)	New Sounds in Swing (1956)

I'm Still Swinging is an album by jazz trumpeter Joe Newman's Octet recorded in 1955 for the RCA Victor label. The album features cover art by Andy Warhol.

== Reception ==
Professional ratings
Review scores
Source	Rating
Allmusic	3/5 stars

Allmusic awarded the album 3 stars.

== Track listing ==
1. "Top Hat, White Tie and Tails" (Irving Berlin) - 2:41
2. "You Can Depend on Me" (Charles Carpenter, Louis Dunlap, Earl Hines) - 3:33
3. "We'll Be Together Again" (Carl Fischer, Frankie Laine) - 3:38
4. "It's Bad for Me" (Cole Porter) - 3:19
5. "Exactly Like You" (Jimmy McHugh, Dorothy Fields) - 3:15
6. "Shameful Roger" (Manny Albam) - 2:46
7. "The Daughter of Miss Thing" (Ernie Wilkins) - 2:35
8. "Sometimes I'm Happy" (Vincent Youmans, Irving Caesar) - 3:04
9. "Sweethearts on Parade" (Carmen Lombardo, Charles Newman) - 2:41
10. "Slats" (Joe Newman, Wilkins) - 3:51
11. "Lament for a Lost Love" (Duke Ellington, Barney Bigard, Irving Mills) - 3:11
12. "Perfidia" (Alberto Domínguez, Milton Leeds) - 2:50
- Recorded at Webster Hall in New York City on October 3 (tracks 1, 2, 6 & 8–12) and October 4 (tracks 3–5 & 7), 1955

== Personnel ==
- Joe Newman - trumpet
- Urbie Green - trombone
- Gene Quill - alto saxophone
- Al Cohn - tenor saxophone
- Dick Katz - piano
- Freddie Green - guitar
- Eddie Jones - bass
- Shadow Wilson - drums
