= John Adriano Acea =

American jazz pianist

John Adriano Acea (September 11, 1917 – July 25, 1963) was an American jazz pianist. He was born in Philadelphia to Adriano Acea of Cuba and Leona Acea of Virginia. One of six children, he was expected to die during his first decade of life from rheumatic fever, as did his youngest sister, Anna.

== Session musician collaborations ==
During the 1930s, Acea started out as a trumpeter and saxophonist. After his military service (US Army) in 1946, he switched to playing the piano. He later became a session musician with jazz veterans, including:

- Eddie Lockjaw Davis
- Cootie Williams
- Dizzy Gillespie
- Illinois Jacquet
- Dinah Washington
- James Moody
- Zoot Sims
- Roy Haynes

== Compositions ==
Acea is listed as co-composer on "Nice 'N' Greasy" – the closing track to Lou Donaldson's 1962 album, The Natural Soul. He is also credited as a composer on recordings by Gillespie, Jacquet and Moody.

== Discography ==
=== As sideman ===
With Grant Green

- The Latin Bit (Blue Note, 1962)

With Dodo Greene

- My Hour of Need (Blue Note, 1962)

With Roy Haynes

- Busman's Holiday (EmArcy, 1954)

With Illinois Jacquet

- Groovin' with Jacquet (Clef, 1951-53 [1956])
- The Kid and the Brute (Clef, 1955) with Ben Webster

With Joe Newman

- Locking Horns (Rama, 1957) with and Zoot Sims
- The Happy Cats (Coral, 1957)

With Leo Parker

- Rollin' with Leo (Blue Note, 1961)

With Jesse Powell

- It's Party Time (Tru-Sound, 1962)

With Don Wilkerson

- Elder Don (Blue Note, 1962)
