= Counting Five in Sweden =

Live album by Joe Newman and Count Basie's All Stars
- Released: 1958
- Recorded: October 2 & 13, 1958; Gothenburg Concert Hall and Stockholm Concert Hall, Sweden
- Genre: Jazz
- Label: Metronome; MLP 15018

Joe Newman chronology
Joe Newman with Woodwinds (1958)	Counting Five in Sweden (1958)	Jive at Five (1960)

Counting Five in Sweden is a live album by trumpeter Joe Newman with Count Basie's All Stars recorded in Sweden in 1958 for the Swedish Metronome label and also released in the US on World Pacific.

== Reception ==
Professional ratings
Review scores
Source	Rating
Allmusic	3/5 stars

AllMusic awarded the album 3 stars.

== Track listing ==
1. "Feather's Nest" (Ernie Wilkins) - 7:55
2. "Ballad Medley: Easy Living/September Song/Don't Blame Me" (Ralph Rainger, Leo Robin/Kurt Weill/Jimmy McHugh) - 6:30
3. "The Sleeper" (Wilkins) - 7:20
4. "Cute" (Neal Hefti) - 5:55
5. "Slats" (Joe Newman) - 8:45
6. "When the Saints Go Marching In" (Traditional) - 6:20
- Recorded in Gothenburg on October 2 (tracks 1 & 5) and Stockholm on October 13 (tracks 2–4 & 6), 1958

== Personnel ==
- Joe Newman - trumpet
- Al Grey - trombone
- Frank Wess - tenor saxophone, flute
- Nat Pierce - piano
- Eddie Jones - bass
- Sonny Payne - drums
- Putte Wickman - clarinet (track 6)
