= Flute of the Loom =

Studio album by Frank Wess
- Released: 1973
- Genre: Jazz
- Length: 42:32
- Labels: Enterprise; ENS-5006
- Producers: Don Davis, Rudy Robinson

Frank Wess chronology
Wess to Memphis (1970)	Flute of the Loom (1973)	Flute Juice (1981)

Flute of the Loom is an album by jazz flautist and saxophonist Frank Wess released in 1973 on the Enterprise Records label.

Depending on the track, Wess plays tenor saxophone, alto saxophone and mainly the flute. Arrangers are listed as Chico O’Farrill, Rudy Robinson and Jimmy Roach.

The album cover art (Note: Cover depicting a flute behind some foods with intent to imitate the misremembered logo of "Fruit Of The Loom" brand.) (created by Ellis Chappel) is often cited in discussions on the Mandela effect phenomenon surrounding collective memories of Fruit of the Loom depicting a cornucopia in its logo. (Note: One more example of these false memories is evinced in a January 1974 newspaper review of this album: "It's Frank Wess' 'Flute Of The Loom' — that's right, a parody on the famous men's underwear advertising slogan. The horn of plenty in this case is a curved flute (what else?) filled with a bounty of soul food (obviously inspired by this black artist)".)

== Track listing ==
1. Get On Board (The Train Is Coming) – 3:52
2. Red Roses – 2:22
3. Trezia – 5:18
4. Arundelle – 4:08
5. When I Fall in Love – 5:40
6. Wade in the Water (Traditional) – 4:12
7. You Are Everything – 3:08
8. Flowers – 4:00
9. I Know What's On Your Mind – 4:46
10. (Sittin' On) The Dock of the Bay – 5:12

== Personnel ==
- Frank Wess – flute (tracks 1, 2, 3, 6, 7, 9, 10), tenor saxophone (tracks 4, 5), alto saxophone (track 8).
- Ted Dunbar – guitar (tracks 3, 4)
- Unknown – strings, percussions, vibraphone, various instruments.
