= Joe Newman with Woodwinds =

Studio album by Joe Newman
- Released: 1958
- Recorded: May 6 & 7, 1958; New York City
- Genre: Jazz
- Label: Roulette; SR 52014
- Producer: Teddy Reig

Joe Newman chronology
Soft Swingin' Jazz (1958)	Joe Newman with Woodwinds (1958)	Counting Five in Sweden (1958)

Joe Newman with Woodwinds is a 1958 album by trumpeter Joe Newman, featuring members of the Count Basie Orchestra. It was originally released on the Roulette label.

== Reception ==
Professional ratings
Review scores
Source	Rating
AllMusic	3/5 stars

AllMusic awarded the album 3 stars.

== Track listing ==
1. "Star Eyes" (Gene de Paul, Don Raye) - 3:23
2. "Speak Low" (Kurt Weill, Ogden Nash) - 2:07
3. "Time" (Felice Bryant, Boudleaux Bryant) - 2:20
4. "Baby, Won't You Please Come Home" (Charles Warfield, Clarence Williams) - 2:54
5. "You're My Thrill" (Jay Gorney, Sidney Clare) - 2:38
6. "Travelin' Light" (Trummy Young, Jimmy Mundy, Johnny Mercer) - 2:19
7. "That Old Devil Moon" (Burton Lane, Yip Harburg) - 1:53
8. "Lover Man" (Jimmy Davis, Ram Ramirez, James Sherman) - 3:10
9. "Out of Nowhere" (Johnny Green, Edward Heyman) - 2:29
10. "Nancy" (Jimmy Van Heusen, Phil Silvers) - 3:12
11. "My Old Flame" (Arthur Johnston, Sam Coslow) - 3:11
12. "I'll Get By" (Fred E. Ahlert, Roy Turk) - 2:14

== Personnel ==
- Joe Newman - trumpet
- Marshal Royal - alto saxophone, clarinet
- Jerry Sanfino, Frank Wess - tenor saxophone, flute
- George Berg - tenor saxophone, clarinet
- Romeo Penque - tenor saxophone, flute, oboe
- Charlie Fawlkes - baritone saxophone, bass clarinet
- Freddie Green - guitar
- Jimmie Jones - piano
- Eddie Jones - bass
- Charlie Persip, Ed Shaughnessy - drums
- Ernie Wilkins - arranger
