= New Sounds in Swing =

Studio album by Joe Newman and Billy Byers
- Released: 1956
- Recorded: 1956; New York City
- Genre: Jazz
- Label: Jazztone; J-1217
- Producer: George T. Simon

Joe Newman chronology
I'm Still Swinging (1955)	New Sounds in Swing (1956)	Salute to Satch (1956)

New Sounds in Swing (also released as Byers' Guide) is an album by jazz trumpeter Joe Newman and trombonist Billy Byers recorded in 1956 for the mail order Jazztone label.

== Reception ==
Professional ratings
Review scores
Source	Rating
Allmusic	4/5 stars

Writing for AllMusic, Ken Dryden awarded the album four stars, noting "Byers wrote most of the music for the date and the solos remain very fresh. The performances are comparable to other musicians' better-known dates that have had the benefit of better promotion by their record labels and wider exposure through reissues".

== Track listing ==
All compositions by Billy Byers except as indicated

1. "Who's Cool?" – 6:18
2. "Byers' Guide" – 3:56
3. "Happiness Is Just a Thing Called Joe" (Harold Arlen, Yip Harburg) – 4:19
4. "Fingernails on the Windowpane" – 4:09
5. "April's Delight" (Judy Spencer) – 6:36
6. "Gin and Catatonic" – 5:12
7. "Dialogue in F" (Spencer) – 4:17
8. "Tribute to the West" – 4:18
9. "I Found a Million Dollar Baby" (Harry Warren, Mort Dixon, Billy Rose) – 2:24
10. "Which One Is Sali" – 7:31

== Personnel ==
- Joe Newman – trumpet
- Billy Byers – trombone, arranger
- Gene Quill – alto saxophone, clarinet
- Lou Stein – piano
- Milt Hinton – bass
- Osie Johnson – drums
