= Introducing Kenny Burrell: The First Blue Note Sessions =

Compilation album by Kenny Burrell
- Released: 2000
- Recorded: May 29–30, 1956 (1–9); Van Gelder Studio, Hackensack; March 12, 1956 (CD2 1–6); Audio-Video Studios, New York; February 10, 1956 (CD2 7–11); Van Gelder Studio, Hackensack
- Genre: Jazz
- Length: 118:38
- Labels: Blue Note; Blue Note 24561
- Producer: Alfred Lion

Professional ratings
Review scores
Source	Rating
The Penguin Guide to Jazz Recordings	3.5/4 stars

Introducing Kenny Burrell: The First Blue Note Sessions is a compilation album by jazz guitarist Kenny Burrell. It compiles:

Introducing Kenny Burrell (Disc 1, #1–7)
Kenny Burrell Volume 2 (Disc 1, #8–9; Disc 2 #1–4 and 6)
K. B. Blues (Disc 2, #7–11) (1979, Blue Note Japan, GXF-3052)

The album also features the outtake "My Heart Stood Still", originally appeared on the hard to find Swingin' (GXF-3070). All the tracks were recorded mainly at Van Gelder Studio between February and May 1956 and were produced by Alfred Lion.

== Track listing ==
All compositions by Kenny Burrell except as indicated

Disc One

1. "This Time the Dream's on Me" (Arlen, Mercer) - 5:00
2. "Fugue 'N Blues" - 6:48
3. "Takeela" - 4:19
4. "Weaver of Dreams" (Elliott, Young) - 4:43
5. "Delilah" (Young) - 6:04
6. "Rhythmorama" (Kenny Clarke) - 6:28
7. "Blues for Skeeter" - 8:08
8. "Get Happy" (Arlen, Koehler) - 4:02
9. "But Not for Me" (Gershwin, Gershwin) - 3:49

Disc Two

1. "Moten Swing" (Bennie Moten) - 6:08
2. "Cheetah" - 4:43
3. "Now See How You Are" (Woody Harris, Oscar Pettiford) - 5:54
4. "Phinupi" - 4:42
5. "My Heart Stood Still" (Hart, Rodgers) - 5:13
6. "How About You?" (Lane, Ralph Freed) - 5:14
7. "K.B. Blues" - 6:24
8. "D.B. Blues" (Young) - 5:50
9. "Nica's Dream" (Horace Silver) - 9:37
10. "Out for Blood" - 9:06
11. "K.B. Blues" [Alternate Take] - 6:16

Disc One recorded on May 29–30, 1956;
Disc Two #1–6 on March 12, 1956; #7–11 on February 10, 1956.

== Personnel ==
Disc One

- Kenny Burrell – guitar (except on #6)
- Tommy Flanagan – piano (except on #6 & 9)
- Paul Chambers – bass (except on #6 & 9)
- Kenny Clarke – drums (except on #9)
- Candido – conga (except on #2, 4 & 9)

Disc Two #1–6

- Kenny Burrell – guitar
- Tommy Flanagan – piano
- Frank Foster – tenor saxophone
- Oscar Pettiford – bass
- Shadow Wilson – drums

Disc Two #7–11

- Kenny Burrell – guitar
- Horace Silver – piano
- Hank Mobley – tenor saxophone
- Doug Watkins – bass
- Louis Hayes – drums
