= Joe's Hap'nin's =

Studio album by Joe Newman
- Released: 1961
- Recorded: May 9, 1961
- Studio: Van Gelder Studio, Englewood Cliffs, NJ
- Genre: Jazz
- Label: Swingville; SVLP 2027
- Producer: Esmond Edwards

Joe Newman chronology
Good 'n' Groovy (1961)	Joe's Hap'nin's (1961)	Joe Newman Quintet at Count Basie's (1961)

Joe's Hap'nin's is an album by trumpeter Joe Newman featuring tracks recorded in 1961 and originally released on the Swingville label.

== Reception ==
Professional ratings
Review scores
Source	Rating
AllMusic	3/5 stars

AllMusic awarded the album 3 stars.

== Track listing ==
All compositions by Joe Newman except as indicated

1. "Oh Gee" (Matthew Gee) - 4:11
2. "Dacquiri" - 5:00
3. "The Very Thought of You" (Ray Noble) - 6:38
4. "Strike up the Band" (George Gershwin, Ira Gershwin) - 3:01
5. "Blues for Slim" - 6:40
6. "For You" (Johnny Burke, Al Dubin) - 8:11
7. "The Continental" (Con Conrad, Herb Magidson) - 3:20

== Personnel ==
- Joe Newman - trumpet
- Tommy Flanagan - piano
- Wendell Marshall - bass
- Billy English - drums
