= Opus de Blues =

Studio album by Frank Wess
- Released: 1959
- Recorded: December 8, 1959
- Studio: Van Gelder Studio, Englewood Cliffs, New Jersey
- Genre: Jazz
- Length: 33:49
- Label: Savoy; MG 12142/SST 13009
- Producer: Ozzie Cadena

Frank Wess chronology
Wheelin' & Dealin' (1957)	Opus de Blues (1959)	The Frank Wess Quartet (1960)

Opus de Blues is an album nominally led by saxophonist/flautist Frank Wess that was recorded in 1959 but not released on the Savoy label until it was first issued in Japan in 1984 and the United States in 1991. The British label Fresh Sound records released a remastered CD of the original album with bonus tracks from two additional albums.

== Reception ==
Professional ratings
Review scores
Source	Rating
Allmusic	3/5 stars

Allmusic reviewer by Jim Todd stated, "Unlike some of the other Savoy releases in the Opus De series, this is not chamber jazz, but a relaxed, blowing session. The five blues-based themes are pleasant, easygoing vehicles, familiar ground for any Basie associate. The playing is skillful, although unremarkable ... Not essential listening, but of possible interest to Basiephiles. The sound recording is good, accurately capturing the horns, rhythm section, and ensemble parts".

== Track listings ==
Original LP

All compositions by Thad Jones except where noted

1. "I Hear Ya Talkin'" (Frank Wess) – 4:09
2. "Liz" – 3:32
3. "Boop-Pe-Doop" (Curtis Fuller) – 8:37
4. "Opus de Blues" – 10:56
5. "Struttin' Down Broadway" – 5:35

CD remaster by Fresh Sound Records

1. "I Hear Ya Talkin" (Frank Wess) 4:09
2. "Liz" (Thad Jones) 3:33
3. "Boop De Doop" (Curtis Fuller) 8:39
4. "Opus De Blues" (Thad Jones) 10:57
5. "Struttin Down His Broadway (Thad Jones) 5:36
6. "Subtle Rebuttal" (Thad Jones) 3:56
7. "Tip Toe" (Thad Jones) 3:29
8. "H & T Blues" (Thad Jones) 9:47
9. "Friday the 13th" (Thad Jones) 6:49

Tracks 6–8, recorded in 1960, are from the album, The Birdland Story (Roulette SRB-2). Track 9 is from the album Lee Morgan/Thad Jones Minor Strain (Roulette 94574), also recorded 1960.

== Personnel ==
- Frank Wess – flute, tenor saxophone
- Thad Jones – trumpet
- Curtis Fuller – trombone
- Charlie Fowlkes – baritone saxophone
- Hank Jones – piano
- Eddie Jones - bass
- Gus Johnson - drums
