= Kenny Burrell, Volume 2 =

Kenny Burrell

Studio album by Kenny Burrell
- Released: April 1957
- Recorded: March 12, 1956; May 29–31, 1956
- Venue: Café Bohemia, NYC
- Studio: Audio-Video Studios, NYC; Van Gelder Studio, Hackensack, New Jersey
- Genre: Jazz
- Length: 34:32
- Label: Blue Note; BLP 1543
- Producer: Alfred Lion

Kenny Burrell chronology
Introducing Kenny Burrell (1956)	Kenny Burrell (1957)	Swingin' (1956)

Kenny Burrell, also known as Kenny Burrell, Volume 2, is an album by American jazz guitarist Kenny Burrell primarily recorded on March 12, 1956 and released on Blue Note the following year.

== Background ==
=== Artwork ===
The cover art was illustrated by Andy Warhol.

=== Release history ===
In 2000, it was released on the 2 CD-set Introducing Kenny Burrell: The First Blue Note Sessions along with Introducing Kenny Burrell, plus bonus tracks.

== Track listing ==
Side 1
No.	Title	Writer(s)	Date recorded	Length
1.	"Get Happy"	Harold Arlen; Ted Koehler	May 29, 1956	4:02
2.	"But Not for Me"	George Gershwin; Ira Gershwin	May 30, 1956	3:49
3.	"Mexico City" (live)	Kenny Dorham	May 31, 1956	6:03
4.	"Moten Swing"	Bennie Moten	March 12, 1956	6:08

Side 2
No.	Title	Writer(s)	Date recorded	Length
1.	"Cheetah"	Kenny Burrell	March 12, 1956	4:43
2.	"Now See How You Are"	Woody Harris; Oscar Pettiford	March 12, 1956	5:54
3.	"Phinupi"		March 12, 1956	4:42
4.	"How About You?"	Burton Lane; Ralph Freed	March 12, 1956	5:14

- "Mexico City" is an alternate take to the version on Dorham's 'Round About Midnight at the Cafe Bohemia.

== Personnel ==
=== Musicians ===
==== March 12, 1956 ====
- Kenny Burrell – guitar
- Frank Foster – tenor saxophone (except "Moten Swing", "Cheetah")
- Tommy Flanagan – piano
- Oscar Pettiford – bass
- Shadow Wilson – drums
  - recorded at Audio-Video Studios, NYC

==== May 29, 1956 ====
- Kenny Burrell – guitar
- Tommy Flanagan – piano
- Paul Chambers – bass
- Kenny Clarke – drums
- Candido – conga
  - recorded at Van Gelder Studio, Hackensack, New Jersey

==== May 30, 1956 ====
- Kenny Burrell – guitar
  - recorded at Van Gelder Studio, Hackensack, New Jersey

==== May 31, 1956 ====
- Kenny Burrell – guitar
- Kenny Dorham – trumpet
- J. R. Monterose – tenor saxophone
- Bobby Timmons – piano
- Sam Jones – bass
- Arthur Edgehill – drums
  - recorded live at the Café Bohemia, NYC

=== Technical personnel ===
- Alfred Lion – producer
- Rudy Van Gelder – recording engineer, mastering
- Reid Miles – cover design
- Andy Warhol – cover illustration
- Leonard Feather – liner notes
