= Yo Ho! Poor You, Little Me =

Studio album by Frank Wess
- Released: 1963
- Recorded: January 24, 1963
- Studio: Van Gelder Studio, Englewood Cliffs, New Jersey
- Genre: Jazz
- Length: 33:08
- Label: Prestige; PRLP 7266
- Producer: Ozzie Cadena

Frank Wess chronology
| Southern Comfort (1962) | Yo Ho! Poor You, Little Me (1963) | The Award Winner (1964) |

Yo Ho! Poor You, Little Me is an album by jazz saxophonist Frank Wess which was recorded in 1963 and released on the Prestige label.

== Reception ==
Professional ratings
Review scores
| Source | Rating |
|---|---|
| Allmusic | 4/5 stars |

The Allmusic site stated: "For those who were used to hearing Wess in the Basie band, it was a treat to hear him in a more intimate setting. A small group meant more improvising and more stretching out".

== Track listing ==
All compositions by Frank Wess, except where noted.

1. "The Lizard" (Thad Jones) - 5:16
2. "Little Me" (Cy Coleman, Carolyn Leigh) - 5:12
3. "Yo-Ho" - 5:22
4. "Cold Miner" - 3:40
5. "Poor You" (Yip Harburg, Burton Lane) - 3:47
6. "The Long Road" - 9:51

== Personnel ==
- Frank Wess - flute, tenor saxophone
- Thad Jones - trumpet
- Gildo Mahones - piano
- Buddy Catlett - bass
- Roy Haynes - drums
