= Locking Horns =

Studio album by Joe Newman and Zoot Sims
- Released: 1957
- Recorded: April 10, 1957; New York City
- Genre: Jazz
- Label: Rama RLP 1003; Roulette SR 52009
- Producer: Joe Guercio

Joe Newman chronology
| The Happy Cats (1957) | Locking Horns (1957) | Soft Swingin' Jazz (1958) |

Zoot Sims chronology
| Al and Zoot (1957) | Locking Horns (1957) | Stretching Out (1958) |

Roulette Records cover

Locking Horns is an album by trumpeter Joe Newman and saxophonist Zoot Sims recorded in 1957 and originally released on the Rama label before it was sold to Roulette Records.

== Reception ==
Professional ratings
Review scores
| Source | Rating |
|---|---|
| AllMusic | 4/5 stars |

AllMusic awarded the album 4 stars.

== Track listing ==
All compositions by Adriano Acea except as indicated

1. "Corky" (Joe Newman) - 4:45
2. "Mambo for Joe" - 3:50
3. "Wolafunt's Lament" (Bill Graham) - 3:45
4. "Midnite Fantasy" - 3:35
5. "'Tater Pie" - 3:35
6. "Oh Shaye" - 3:50
7. "Bassing Around" (Osie Johnson) - 3:59
8. "Oh Joe" (Newman) - 4:30
9. "Susette" - 4:00
10. "Similar Souls" (Johnson) - 6:18

== Personnel ==
- Joe Newman - trumpet
- Zoot Sims - tenor saxophone
- Adrian Acea - piano
- Oscar Pettiford - bass
- Osie Johnson - drums
