= Swingin' (Kenny Burrell album) =

Studio album by Kenny Burrell
- Released: 1980
- Recorded: March 12, 1956; May 14, 1958; August 26, 1959
- Genre: Jazz
- Label: Blue Note; GXF3070
- Producer: Alfred Lion

Kenny Burrell chronology
Kenny Burrell Volume 2 (1956)	Swingin' (1980)	All Night Long (Kenny Burrell album) (1956)

Swingin' is a 1980 compilation album by American jazz guitarist Kenny Burrell. The album includes five tracks taken from three different studio sessions and a live recording between 1956 and 1959.

== Track listing ==
No.	Title	Writer(s)	Length
1.	"I Never Knew"	Gus Kahn, Ted Fio Rito	12:37
2.	"My Heart Stood Still"	Lorenz Hart, Richard Rodgers	5:15
3.	"Beef Stew Blues"	Randy Weston	4:36
4.	"If You Could See Me Now"	Tadd Dameron, Carl Sigman	5:29
5.	"Swingin'"	Clifford Brown	9:56

Recording sessions

- Track 1 recorded at Manhattan Towers, NYC, on May 14, 1958.
- Track 2 recorded at Audio-Video Studios, NYC, on March 12, 1956.
- Tracks 3, 4, 5 recorded at the Five Spot Café, NYC, on August 25, 1959.

== Personnel ==
Band

- Kenny Burrell – guitar
- Ben Tucker – bass (tracks 3, 4, 5)
- Oscar Pettiford – bass (track 2)
- Sam Jones – bass (track 1)
- Art Blakey – drums (tracks 1, 3, 4, 5)
- Shadow Wilson – drums (track 2)
- Bobby Timmons – piano (track 5)
- Duke Jordan – piano (track 1)
- Roland Hanna – piano (tracks 3, 4)
- Tommy Flanagan – piano (track 2)
- Frank Foster – tenor sax (track 2)
- Junior Cook – tenor sax (track 1)
- Tina Brooks – tenor sax (tracks 1, 5)
- Louis Smith – trumpet (track 1)

Production

- Rudy Van Gelder – engineer
- Bob Porter – liner notes
- K. Abe – photography
- Alfred Lion – producer
- Michael Cuscuna – producer
