= Stretching Out (Zoot Sims and Bob Brookmeyer album) =

Studio album by Zoot Sims-Bob Brookmeyer Octet
- Released: 1959
- Recorded: December 27, 1958
- Studio: Nola Penthouse Studio, New York City
- Genre: Jazz
- Length: 35:55
- Label: United Artists; UAL 4023/UAS 5023
- Producer: Jack Lewis

Bob Brookmeyer chronology
Kansas City Revisited (1958)	Stretching Out (1959)	The Ivory Hunters (1959)

Zoot Sims chronology
Locking Horns (1957)	Stretching Out (1958)	Jazz Alive! A Night at the Half Note (1959)

Stretching Out is an album by the Zoot Sims-Bob Brookmeyer Octet recorded in 1958 for the United Artists label.

== Reception ==
Professional ratings
Review scores
Source	Rating
Allmusic	4/5 stars

The Allmusic review by Ken Dryden stated: "Aside from a few innocuous reed squeaks, the music is essentially flawless and has stood the test of time very well. ...fans of cool jazz will want to locate a copy of this session".

== Track listing ==
1. "Stretching Out" (Bob Brookmeyer) - 6:07
2. "Now Will You Be Good?" (Harry Pease, Arthur Terker, Harry Jentes) - 5:27
3. "Pennies from Heaven" (Arthur Johnston, Johnny Burke) - 6:14
4. "King Porter Stomp" (Jelly Roll Morton) - 4:37
5. "Ain't Misbehavin'" (Harry Brooks, Fats Waller, Andy Razaf) - 6:52
6. "Bee Kay" (Bill Potts) - 6:38

== Personnel ==
- Zoot Sims - tenor saxophone
- Bob Brookmeyer - valve trombone
- Harry "Sweets" Edison - trumpet
- Al Cohn - tenor saxophone, baritone saxophone
- Hank Jones - piano
- Freddie Green - guitar
- Eddie Jones - bass
- Charlie Persip - drums
- Al Cohn (track 3), Bill Potts (track 6), Bob Brookmeyer (tracks 1, 2 & 3–5) - arranger
