= Joe Newman Quintet at Count Basie's =

Live album by Joe Newman Quintet
- Released: 1962
- Recorded: 1961; Count Basie's, New York City
- Genre: Jazz
- Label: Mercury; MG 20696/SR 60696
- Producer: Quincy Jones

Joe Newman chronology
Joe's Hap'nin's (1961)	Joe Newman Quintet at Count Basie's (1962)	In a Mellow Mood (1962)

Joe Newman Quintet at Count Basie's is a live album by trumpeter Joe Newman recorded in New York in 1961 for the Mercury label.

== Reception ==
Professional ratings
Review scores
Source	Rating
AllMusic	3.5/5 stars

AllMusic reviewer Tim Sendra stated: "While this record may have seemed like the beginning of a great solo career for Joe Newman, in fact it was his final session for a major label as a leader... It isn't an essential purchase for the casual jazz fan but Newman fans (and fans of great trumpeters) will be thrilled by its appearance".

== Track listing ==
All compositions by Joe Newman, except as indicated.

1. "Caravan" (Juan Tizol, Duke Ellington, Irving Mills) - 9:46
2. "Love Is Here to Stay" (George Gershwin, Ira Gershwin) - 4:33
3. "Please Send Me Someone to Love" (Percy Mayfield) - 5:46
4. "The Midgets" - 4:18
5. "Cute" (Neal Hefti) Bonus track on reissue
6. "On Green Dolphin Street" (Bronisław Kaper, Ned Washington) - 5:52
7. "Wednesday's Blues" - 8:10
8. "Bird Song" (Thad Jones) - 6:19 Bonus track on reissue

== Personnel ==
- Joe Newman - trumpet
- Oliver Nelson - tenor saxophone
- Lloyd Mayers - piano
- Art Davis - bass
- Ed Shaughnessy - drums
