= Frankly Speaking (album) =

Studio album by Frank Foster and Frank Wess
- Released: 1985
- Recorded: December 1984
- Studio: Skyline Studios, NYC
- Genre: Jazz
- Length: 49:39
- Label: Concord Jazz; CJ-276
- Producer: Bennett Rubin

Frank Foster chronology
Two for the Blues (1984)	Frankly Speaking (1985)	Generations (1985)

Frank Wess chronology
Two for the Blues (1984)	Frankly Speaking (1985)	Entre Nous (1990)

Frankly Speaking is an album by saxophonists Frank Foster and Frank Wess which was recorded in 1984 and released on the Concord Jazz label the following year.

== Reception ==
Professional ratings
Review scores
Source	Rating
AllMusic	4/5 stars

The AllMusic review by Scott Yanow said "Using the same personnel as the previous year's Two for the Blues, this set gets the slight edge and is an excellent introduction to the playing of the two Count Basie saxophonists. ... Recommended".

== Track listing ==
All compositions by Frank Foster except where noted

1. "An' All Such Stuff as 'Dat" – 6:32
2. "The Summer Knows" (Michel Legrand, Alan Bergman, Marilyn Bergman) – 6:47
3. "When Did You Leave Heaven?" (Richard A. Whiting, Walter Bullock) – 7:12
4. "Up and Coming" (Frank Wess) – 4:43
5. "One Morning in May" (Hoagy Carmichael, Mitchell Parish) – 5:01
6. "Two Franks" (Neal Hefti) – 3:09
7. "This Is All I Ask" (Gordon Jenkins) – 10:22
8. "Blues Backstage" – 5:47

== Personnel ==
- Frank Foster – soprano saxophone, tenor saxophone
- Frank Wess – tenor saxophone, flute
- Kenny Barron – piano
- Rufus Reid – double bass
- Marvin "Smitty" Smith – drums
