= Soft Swingin' Jazz =

Studio album by Joe Newman Quartet Featuring Shirley Scott
- Released: 1958
- Recorded: January 13, 15 & 17, 1958; New York City
- Genre: Jazz
- Label: Coral; CRL 57208

Joe Newman chronology
Locking Horns (1957)	Soft Swingin' Jazz (1958)	Joe Newman with Woodwinds (1958)

Soft Swingin' Jazz is an album by trumpeter Joe Newman's Quartet with organist Shirley Scott recorded in early 1958 for the Coral label.

== Reception ==
Professional ratings
Review scores
Source	Rating
Allmusic	3.5/5 stars

Allmusic awarded the album 3½ stars stating "a mellow, lovely session unique within the trumpeter's catalog. For starters, Newman assumes vocal duties on a handful of cuts, proving himself a fine crooner. Moreover, the spacious, nuanced arrangements afford him the room to summon some of his most intimate but impassioned solos. Not to mention that Scott's an uncommonly sympathetic collaborator, shaping and underlining the melodies to create rolling, contoured grooves with the texture of velvet.".

== Track listing ==
1. "Makin' Whoopee" (Walter Donaldson, Gus Kahn) – 3:18
2. "Three Little Words" (Harry Ruby, Bert Kalmar) – 2:38
3. "Scotty" (Shirley Scott) – 4:28
4. "There's a Small Hotel" (Richard Rodgers, Lorenz Hart) – 2:37
5. "I Let a Song Go Out of My Heart" (Duke Ellington, Irving Mills, Henry Nemo, John Redmond) – 3:19
6. "Moonglow" (Will Hudson, Mills, Eddie DeLange) – 3:39
7. "Organ Grinder's Swing" (Hudson, Mills, Mitchell Parish) – 3:01
8. "Rosetta" (Earl Hines, Henri Woode) – 3:35
9. "Too Marvelous for Words" (Richard A. Whiting, Johnny Mercer) – 3:07
10. "The Farmer's Daughter" (Harold Arlen, Yip Harburg) – 2:59
11. "Save Your Love for Me" (Buddy Johnson) – 3:56
- Recorded in New York City on January 13 (tracks 2, 10 & 11), January 15 (tracks 1, 3, 8 & 9) and January 17 (tracks 4–7), 1958

== Personnel ==
- Joe Newman – trumpet, vocals
- Shirley Scott – organ
- Eddie Jones – bass
- Charlie Persip – drums
- Ernie Wilkins – piano (track 11)
