= The Happy Cats =

Studio album by Joe Newman Sextet
- Released: 1957
- Recorded: January 7, 1957; New York City
- Genre: Jazz
- Label: Coral; CRL 57121

Joe Newman chronology
The Midgets (1956)	The Happy Cats (1957)	Locking Horns (1957)

The Happy Cats is an album by trumpeter Joe Newman's Sextet recorded in early 1957 for the Coral label.

== Reception ==
Professional ratings
Review scores
Source	Rating
Allmusic	3/5 stars

Allmusic gave the album 3 stars.

== Track listing ==
All compositions by Joe Newman except as indicated

1. "The Happy Cats" - 3:08
2. "Cocktails for Two" (Arthur Johnston, Sam Coslow) - 2:53
3. "Later for the Happenings" (Johnny Acea) - 3:39
4. "Buttercup" (Bud Powell) - 4:04
5. "Robbin's Nest" (Illinois Jacquet, Sir Charles Thompson) - 4:25
6. "They Can't Take That Away from Me" (George Gershwin, Ira Gershwin) - 2:18
7. "Feather's Nest" (Ernie Wilkins) - 3:46
8. "Mean to Me" (Fred E. Ahlert, Roy Turk) - 3:00
9. "Between the Devil and the Deep Blue Sea" (Harold Arlen, Ted Koehler) - 3:34
10. "Joe's Tune" - 3:19
11. "I Never Knew" (Ted Fio Rito, Gus Kahn) - 3:31

== Personnel ==
- Joe Newman - trumpet
- Frank Rehak - trombone
- Frank Wess - tenor saxophone, flute
- Johnny Acea - piano
- Eddie Jones - bass
- Connie Kay - drums
- Al Cohn (tracks 6, 8 & 9), Ernie Wilkins (tracks 2, 5, 7, 10 & 11), Quincy Jones (tracks 4) - arranger
