= The Midgets =

Studio album by The Joe Newman Septet
- Released: 1956
- Recorded: July 8, 10 & 13, 1956; Webster Hall, New York City
- Genre: Jazz
- Length: 37:21
- Label: Vik; LX 1060
- Producer: Jack Lewis

Joe Newman chronology
I Feel Like a Newman (1956)	The Midgets (1956)	The Happy Cats (1957)

The Midgets is an album by jazz trumpeter Joe Newman's Septet recorded in 1956 for the RCA Records subsidiary Vik label.

== Reception ==
Professional ratings
Review scores
Source	Rating
Allmusic	3/5 stars

Allmusic awarded the album 3 stars.

== Track listing ==
All compositions by Ernie Wilkins except as indicated

1. "The Midgets" (Joe Newman) – 6:09
2. "The Late, Late Show" (Roy Alfred, Murray Berlin) – 2:58
3. "Really? Healy!" – 2:52
4. "One Lamper" – 3:04
5. "She Has Red Hair" – 3:29
6. "Valerie" – 2:55
7. "No Moon at All" (Redd Evans, Dave Mann) – 2:46
8. "Indeed the Blues" – 3:39
9. "Living Dangerously" – 2:50
10. "Scooter" – 2:54
11. "My Dog Friday" – 3:28
- Recorded at Webster Hall in New York City on July 8 (tracks 6, 7, 10 & 11), July 10 (tracks 1, 2 & 8) and July 13 (tracks 3–5 & 9), 1956

== Personnel ==
- Joe Newman – trumpet
- Frank Wess – flute
- Hank Jones – piano, organ
- Barry Galbraith – electric guitar
- Freddie Green – rhythm guitar
- Eddie Jones – bass
- Osie Johnson – drums
- Ernie Wilkins – arranger
