= Introducing Kenny Burrell =

Studio album by Kenny Burrell
- Released: September 1956
- Recorded: May 29–30, 1956
- Studio: Van Gelder Studio; Hackensack, New Jersey
- Genre: Bebop
- Length: 41:30
- Label: Blue Note; BLP 1523
- Producer: Alfred Lion

Kenny Burrell chronology
Introducing Kenny Burrell (1956)	Kenny Burrell Volume 2 (1956)

Introducing Kenny Burrell is the debut album by American jazz guitarist Kenny Burrell, recorded over May 29–30, 1956 and released on Blue Note later that year.

== Release history ==
In 2000, the album was released on the 2 CD-set Introducing Kenny Burrell: The First Blue Note Sessions with Kenny Burrell Volume 2, plus bonus tracks.

== Reception ==
Professional ratings
Review scores
Source	Rating
AllMusic	4/5 stars

The AllMusic review by Scott Yanow awarded the album four stars, stating: "Burrell displays what was already an immediately recognizable tone. At 24, Burrell had quickly emerged to become one of the top bop guitarists of the era, and he is in particularly excellent form... Enjoyable music."

== Track listing ==
All tracks are written by Kenny Burrell, except as noted.

Side 1
No.	Title	Writer(s)	Length
1.	"This Time the Dream's on Me"	Harold Arlen; Johnny Mercer	5:00
2.	"Fugue 'n' Blues"		6:48
3.	"Takeela"		4:19
4.	"Weaver of Dreams"	Jack Elliott; Victor Young	4:43

Side 2
No.	Title	Writer(s)	Length
1.	"Delilah"	Young	6:04
2.	"Rhythmorama"	Kenny Clarke	6:28
3.	"Blues for Skeeter"		8:08

== Personnel ==
=== Musicians ===
- Kenny Burrell – guitar (except "Rhythmorama")
- Tommy Flanagan – piano (except "Rhythmorama")
- Paul Chambers – bass (except "Rhythmorama")
- Kenny Clarke – drums
- Candido Camero – conga (except "Fugue 'n' Blues", "Weaver of Dreams")

=== Technical personnel ===
- Alfred Lion – producer
- Rudy Van Gelder – recording engineer, mastering
- Reid Miles – design
- Francis Wolff – photography
- Leonard Feather – liner notes
