= I Feel Like a Newman =

Studio album by Joe Newman
- Released: 1956
- Recorded: April 1956; New York City
- Genre: Jazz
- Length: 41:43
- Label: Storyville; STLP 905
- Producer: George Wein

Joe Newman chronology
Salute to Satch (1956)	I Feel Like a Newman (1956)	The Midgets (1956)

I Feel Like a Newman is an album by jazz trumpeter Joe Newman recorded in 1956 and originally released on the Storyville label.

== Reception ==
Professional ratings
Review scores
Source	Rating
Allmusic	4/5 stars

Allmusic awarded the album 4 stars stating "the music always swings and the talented musicians are in fine form".

== Track listing ==
1. "This Time the Dream's on Me" (Harold Arlen, Johnny Mercer) - 3:15
2. "Imagination" (Jimmy Van Heusen, Johnny Burke) - 3:24
3. "Midgets" (Joe Newman) - 4:45
4. "Sweetie Cake" (Ernie Wilkins) - 4:44
5. "East of the Sun" (Brooks Bowman) - 5:05
6. "Diffugalty" (Osie Johnston) - 3:12
7. "I Feel Like a Newman" (Manny Albam) - 2:51
8. "King Size" (Wilkins) - 6:38
9. "Gee, Baby, Ain't I Good to You" (Andy Razaf, Don Redman) - 4:11
10. "My Blue Heaven" (Walter Donaldson, George A. Whiting) - 3:38

== Personnel ==
- Joe Newman - trumpet
- Billy Byers - trombone (tracks 1–3 & 6–8)
- Gene Quill - alto saxophone (tracks 1–3 & 6–8)
- Frank Foster - tenor saxophone (tracks 1–3 & 6–8)
- Frank Wess - tenor saxophone, flute (tracks 4, 5, 9 & 10)
- John Lewis (tracks 1–3 & 6–8), Sir Charles Thompson (tracks 4, 5, 9 & 10) - piano
- Freddie Green - guitar (tracks 1–3 & 6–8)
- Milt Hinton (tracks 1–3 & 6–8), Eddie Jones (tracks 4, 5, 9 & 10) - bass
- Osie Johnson (tracks 1–3 & 6–8), Shadow Wilson (tracks 4, 5, 9 & 10) - drums
