= All I Wanna Do Is Swing =

Studio album by The Joe Newman Octet
- Released: 1955
- Recorded: February 8, 1955; Webster Hall, New York City
- Genre: Jazz
- Length: 38:46
- Label: RCA Victor; LPM 1118
- Producer: Jack Lewis

Joe Newman chronology
| Joe Newman and the Boys in the Band (1954) | All I Wanna Do Is Swing (1955) | The Count's Men (1955) |

All I Wanna Do Is Swing (subtitled The Joe Newman Story) is an album by jazz trumpeter Joe Newman's Octet recorded in 1955 for the RCA Victor label.

== Reception ==
Professional ratings
Review scores
| Source | Rating |
|---|---|
| Allmusic | 3/5 stars |

Allmusic awarded the album 3 stars.

== Track listing ==
1. "Soon" (George Gershwin, Ira Gershwin) - 2:42
2. "Limehouse Blues" (Philip Braham, Douglas Furber) - 3:25
3. "Dream a Little Dream of Me" (Fabian Andre, Wilbur Schwandt, Gus Kahn) - 2:36
4. "Corner Pocket" (Freddie Green) - 2:42
5. "If I Could Be with You" (James P. Johnson, Henry Creamer) - 3:07
6. "It's a Thing of the Past" (Manny Albam) - 2:46
7. "Pretty Skinny Bunny" (Ernie Wilkins) - 2:29
8. "Leonice" (Joe Newman) - 3:36
9. "Jack's Wax" (Al Cohn) - 2:31
10. "Topsy" (Eddie Durham, Edgar Battle) - 3:17
11. "Captain Spaulding" (Cohn) - 3:29
12. "I Could Have Told You" (Carl Sigman, Jimmy Van Heusen) – 2:57
13. "Lullaby of Birdland" (George Shearing, George David Weiss) - 3:09 Bonus track on CD reissue

== Personnel ==
- Joe Newman- trumpet
- Frank Rehak - trombone
- Ernie Wilkins - alto saxophone
- Al Cohn - tenor saxophone
- Nat Pierce - piano
- Freddie Green - guitar
- Milt Hinton - bass
- Shadow Wilson - drums
- Manny Albam (tracks 1, 6, 8 & 13), Al Cohn (tracks 2, 5, 9 & 11), Ernie Wilkins (tracks 3, 4, 7, 10 & 12) - arranger
