= Jive at Five =

Studio album by The Joe Newman Quintet Featuring Frank Wess
- Released: 1960
- Recorded: May 4, 1960
- Studio: Van Gelder Studio, Englewood Cliffs, NJ
- Genre: Jazz
- Length: 36:09
- Label: Swingville; SVLP 2011
- Producer: The Sound of America

Joe Newman chronology
| Counting Five in Sweden (1958) | Jive at Five (1960) | Good 'n' Groovy (1961) |

Jive at Five is an album by trumpeter Joe Newman featuring tracks recorded with members of the Count Basie Orchestra in 1960 and originally released on the Swingville label.

== Reception ==
Professional ratings
Review scores
| Source | Rating |
|---|---|
| AllMusic | 4/5 stars |
| The Penguin Guide to Jazz Recordings | 3.5/4 stars |
| DownBeat | 4/5 stars |

AllMusic awarded the album 4 stars stating "Newman and his friends swing their way through four vintage standards and a couple of the leader's original blues in typical fashion".

John A Tynan gave the release 4 stars in his DownBeat review. Tynan called the album "an object lesson in relaxed and intelligent blowing. All the elements fit—compatible musicians, familiar material, assertedly congenial atmosphere — and are doweled together into a deceptively simple and always swinging whole . . . This get-together grooves all the way, coming in and going out swinging".

== Track listing ==
All compositions by Joe Newman except where noted

1. "Wednesday's Blues" - 9:05
2. "Jive at Five" (Count Basie, Harry Edison) - 5:35
3. "More Than You Know" (Vincent Youmans, Edward Eliscu, Billy Rose) - 3:59
4. "Cuein' the Blues" - 4:33
5. "Taps Miller" (Basie, Luis Russell) - 8:18
6. "Don't Worry 'bout Me" (Rube Bloom, Ted Koehler) - 4:39

== Personnel ==
- Joe Newman - trumpet
- Frank Wess - tenor saxophone, flute
- Tommy Flanagan - piano
- Eddie Jones - bass
- Oliver Jackson - drums
