= Jazz Interactions =

Jazz Interactions, Inc. is a non-profit-making organization whose aim is "to stimulate a greater awareness of jazz by providing jazz information and educational services to New York metropolitan area."

The organization was founded in the early 1960s by a group of jazz musicians including Joe Newman and fans including fellow-founder Ernest M. Searle, Jr, and apart from its educational activities it created the Jazz Interactions Orchestra, the Jazz-Line, a telephone line that gave information on Jazz performances throughout the New York City Metro area, and promoted the Jazzmobile, a traveling stage that was used throughout New York City and Long Island, bringing free jazz concerts to many neighborhoods. Jazz Interactions was the original administrator of the Jazz Oral History Project, before handing over responsibility to the Smithsonian Institution (who later passed it on to the Institute of Jazz Studies, a research branch of the John Cotton Dana Library of Rutgers University).

== Sources and external links ==
- Contact details
- "I'm Still learning" — Joe Newman interviewed by Les Tomkins in 1977
