= Good 'n' Groovy =

Studio album by Joe Newman with Frank Foster
- Released: 1961
- Recorded: March 17, 1961
- Studio: Van Gelder Studio, Englewood Cliffs, NJ
- Genre: Jazz
- Length: 38:13
- Label: Swingville; SVLP 2019
- Producer: Esmond Edwards

Joe Newman chronology
Jive at Five (1960)	Good 'n' Groovy (1961)	Joe's Hap'nin's (1961)

Good 'n' Groovy is an album by trumpeter Joe Newman with saxophonist Frank Foster recorded in 1961 and originally released on the Swingville label.

== Reception ==
Professional ratings
Review scores
Source	Rating
AllMusic	4/5 stars
The Penguin Guide to Jazz Recordings	3/4 stars

AllMusic awarded the album 4 stars stating: "This was the second of Joe Newman's three dates he led under the Swingville banner".

== Track listing ==
All compositions by Joe Newman except as indicated

1. "A.M. Romp" - 6:56
2. "Li'l Darlin'" (Neal Hefti) - 5:39
3. "Mo-Lasses" - 6:26
4. "To Rigmor" - 5:15
5. "Just Squeeze Me" (Duke Ellington, Lee Gaines) - 7:03
6. "Loop-D-Loop" - 6:51

== Personnel ==
- Joe Newman - trumpet
- Frank Foster - tenor saxophone
- Tommy Flanagan - piano
- Eddie Jones - bass
- Bill English - drums
