= Opus de Jazz =

Studio album by Milt Jackson
- Released: 1956
- Recorded: October 28, 1955
- Genre: Jazz
- Length: 33:43
- Label: Savoy

Milt Jackson chronology
Quintet / Sextet (1955)	Opus de Jazz (1956)	Ballads & Blues (1956)

Opus de Jazz (subtitled A Hi-Fi Recording for Flute, Vibes, Piano, Bass, Drums) is an album by American jazz vibraphonist Milt Jackson featuring performances recorded in 1955 and released on the Savoy label.

== Reception ==
The AllMusic review by Scott Yanow stated: "This is not essential, but it is enjoyable music."

Professional ratings
Review scores
Source	Rating
AllMusic	3/5 stars

== Track listing ==
1. "Opus de Funk" (Horace Silver) – 13:28
2. "Opus Pocus" (Ozzie Cadena) – 7:25
3. "You Leave Me Breathless" (Ralph Freed, Frederich Hollander) – 6:27
4. "Opus and Interlude" (Cadena) – 6:30

- Recorded in New York City on October 28, 1955

== Personnel ==
- Milt Jackson – vibes
- Frank Wess – tenor saxophone, track 2; flute, tracks 1, 3 and 4
- Hank Jones – piano
- Eddie Jones – bass
- Kenny Clarke – drums
