= Two for the Blues =

Studio album by Frank Foster and Frank Wess
- Released: 1984
- Recorded: October 11–12, 1983
- Studios: Don Elliot Studios, Weston, CT
- Genre: Jazz
- Length: 45:13
- Labels: Pablo; 2310-905
- Producer: Bennett Rubin

Frank Foster chronology
The House That Love Built (1982)	Two for the Blues (1984)	Frankly Speaking (1985)

Frank Wess chronology
Two at the Top (1983)	Two for the Blues (1984)	Frankly Speaking (1985)

Two for the Blues is an album by saxophonists Frank Foster and Frank Wess which was recorded in 1983 and released on the Pablo label the following year.

== Reception ==
Professional ratings
Review scores
Source	Rating
AllMusic	4.5/5 stars
The Penguin Guide to Jazz Recordings	3/4 stars

The AllMusic review by Scott Yanow said it "features Frank Foster (on tenor and soprano) and Frank Wess (tenor, flute and alto) at their best. ... this is an excellent showcase for the two Franks".

== Track listing ==
All compositions by Frank Wess except where noted

1. "Two for the Blues" (Neal Hefti) – 6:41
2. "Send in the Clowns" (Stephen Sondheim) – 6:18
3. "Your Beauty Is a Song of Love" – 4:12
4. "But for the Likes of You" – 4:18
5. "Heat of Winter" (Frank Foster) – 5:44
6. "Nancy (with the Laughing Face)" (Jimmy Van Heusen, Phil Silvers) – 4:16
7. "Spring Can Really Hang You Up the Most" (Fran Landesman, Tommy Wolf) – 5:03
8. "A Time for Love" (Johnny Mandel, Paul Francis Webster) – 5:32
9. "Bay Street" – 3:46

== Personnel ==
- Frank Foster – soprano saxophone, tenor saxophone
- Frank Wess – alto saxophone, tenor saxophone, flute
- Kenny Barron – piano
- Rufus Reid – double bass
- Marvin Smith – drums
