= Southern Comfort (Frank Wess album) =

Studio album by Frank Wess
- Released: 1962
- Recorded: March 22, 1962
- Studio: Van Gelder Studio, Englewood Cliffs, New Jersey
- Genre: Jazz
- Length: 35:37
- Label: Prestige; PRLP 7231
- Producer: Esmond Edwards

Frank Wess chronology
The Frank Wess Quartet (1960)	Southern Comfort (1962)	Yo Ho! Poor You, Little Me (1963)

Southern Comfort is an album by jazz saxophonist Frank Wess which was recorded in 1962 and released on the Prestige label.

== Reception ==
Professional ratings
Review scores
Source	Rating
Allmusic	4/5 stars

The Allmusic site awarded the album 4 stars stating "Nelson's attractive arrangements serve Wess quite well throughout this session... To his credit, Nelson doesn't over-arrange. There is still plenty of room for blowing and improvising, and Wess sounds very uninhibited on everything... One of Wess' most rewarding sessions".

== Track listing ==
All compositions by Frank Wess except where noted:

1. "Southern Comfort" (Oliver Nelson) - 6:33
2. "Blue Skies" (Irving Berlin) - 5:45
3. "Gin's Beguine" - 6:46
4. "Blues for Butterball" (Bob Bryant, Marshall Dodge) - 4:54
5. "Summer Frost" - 3:59
6. "Dancing in the Dark" (Howard Dietz, Arthur Schwartz) - 4:39
7. "Shufflin'" (Nelson) - 3:01

== Personnel ==
- Frank Wess - flute, tenor saxophone
- Al Aarons - trumpet
- George Barrow - baritone saxophone
- Tommy Flanagan - piano
- George Duvivier - bass
- Osie Johnson - drums
- Ray Barretto - congas
- Oliver Nelson - arranger, tenor saxophone
