= Shadow Wilson =

American jazz drummer (1919–1959)

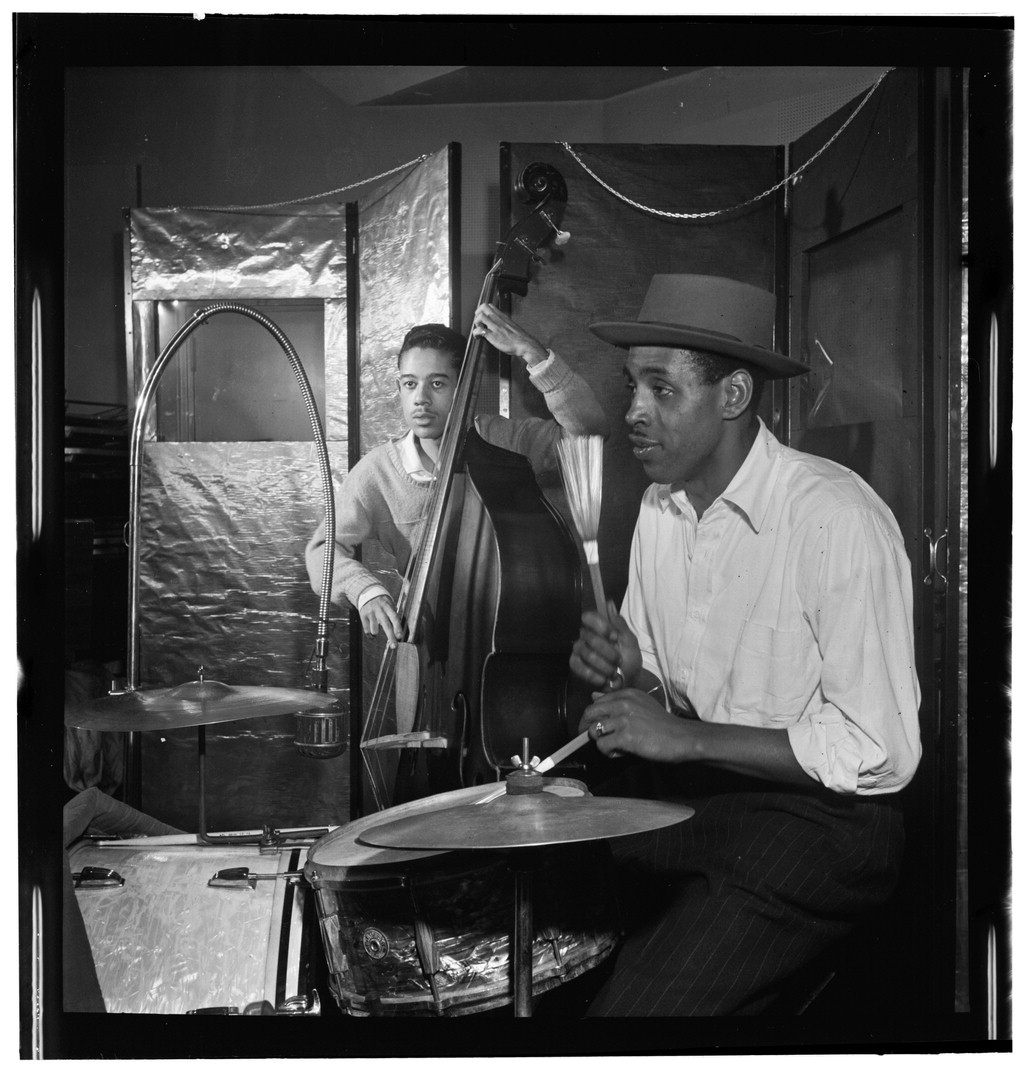

Background information
- Born: Rossiere Wilson; September 25, 1919; Yonkers, New York, US
- Died: July 11, 1959 (aged 39) New York City, US
- Genre: Jazz
- Instrument: Drums

Rossiere "Shadow" Wilson (September 25, 1919 – July 11, 1959) was an American jazz drummer.

Much of Wilson's early work was with swing jazz orchestras. He played with Frankie Fairfax's Campus Club Orchestra in 1936, with Lucky Millinder in 1939, and following this, with Benny Carter, Tiny Bradshaw, Lionel Hampton, Earl Hines, Count Basie, and Woody Herman. Later in his career, he played with Illinois Jacquet, Erroll Garner, Thelonious Monk, Ella Fitzgerald, Joe Newman, Lee Konitz, Sonny Stitt, Phil Woods, Gene Quill, and Tadd Dameron. The drummer was known to sit in at the famed Minton's Playhouse. His nickname came from "his beautiful light touch with brushes," in the words of bassist Peter Ind. Wilson died of meningitis in July 1959. He never recorded as a leader.

== Discography ==
=== As sideman ===
With Thelonious Monk

- Thelonious Monk with John Coltrane (Jazzland, 1957)
- Mulligan Meets Monk (Riverside, 1957)
- Thelonious Monk with John Coltrane (Jazzland, 1961)
- Thelonious Monk Quartet with John Coltrane at Carnegie Hall (Blue Note, 2005)

With Joe Newman

- All I Wanna Do Is Swing (RCA Victor, 1955)
- The Count's Men (Jazztone, 1955)
- I'm Still Swinging (RCA Victor, 1956)
- I Feel Like a Newman (Storyville, 1956)
- Swing Lightly (Jazztone, 1957)

With Sonny Stitt

- Sonny Stitt Plays (Roost, 1955)
- Sonny Stitt Sonny Stitt Sonny Stitt Sonny Stitt (Roost, 1956)
- Kaleidoscope (Prestige, 1957)
- Sonny Stitt with the New Yorkers (Vogue, 1964)

With others

- Kenny Burrell, Kenny Burrell (Blue Note, 1956)
- Kenny Burrell, Swingin' (Blue Note, 1980)
- Earl Coleman, Earl Coleman Returns (Prestige, 1956)
- Tadd Dameron, Fontainebleau (Prestige, 1956)
- Erroll Garner, Encores in Hi Fi (Columbia, 1958)
- Erroll Garner, After Midnight (CBS, 1967)
- Illinois Jacquet, Groovin' with Jacquet (Clef, 1956)
- J. J. Johnson & Kai Winding, Jay and Kai (Columbia, 1957)
- J. J. Johnson, J. J. Johnson's Jazz Quintets (Savoy, 1961)
- Thad Jones, Detroit – New York Junction (Blue Note, 1956)
- Lee Konitz, Very Cool (Verve, 1957)
- Gil Melle, Quadrama (Prestige, 1957)
- Fats Navarro, The Fabulous Fats Navarro Volume 1 (Blue Note, 1957)
- Tony Scott, Both Sides of Tony Scott (RCA Victor, 1956)
- Billy Taylor, The Billy Taylor Touch (Atlantic, 1957)
- Phil Woods & Gene Quill, Phil and Quill (RCA Victor, 1957)
