= The Frank Wess Quartet =

Studio album by Frank Wess
- Released: 1960
- Recorded: May 9, 1960
- Studio: Van Gelder Studio, Englewood Cliffs, New Jersey
- Genre: Jazz
- Length: 37:59
- Label: Moodsville; MVLP 8
- Producer: Esmond Edwards

Frank Wess chronology
Opus de Blues (1959)	The Frank Wess Quartet (1960)	Southern Comfort (1962)

The Frank Wess Quartet is an album by jazz flautist Frank Wess which was recorded in 1960 and released on the Moodsville label.

== Reception ==
Professional ratings
Review scores
Source	Rating
Allmusic	4/5 stars
The Penguin Guide to Jazz Recordings	3/4 stars
DownBeat	4/5 stars

The Allmusic site awarded the album 4 stars stating "Frank Wess has long been one of the most underrated flautists in jazz, but it's his primary instrument on this CD reissue of a Moodsville LP recorded in 1960... Highly recommended".

Leonard Feather assigned the album 4 stars in his DownBeat review. He called the album "lovely, languid music for nocturnal relaxation".

== Track listing ==
1. "It's So Peaceful in the Country" (Alec Wilder) - 4:01
2. "Rainy Afternoon" (Frank Wess) - 8:26
3. "Star Eyes" (Gene de Paul, Don Raye) - 3:54
4. "Stella by Starlight" (Ned Washington, Victor Young) - 5:10
5. "But Beautiful" (Johnny Burke, Jimmy Van Heusen) - 4:36
6. "Gone with the Wind" (Herb Magidson, Allie Wrubel) - 5:46
7. "I See Your Face Before Me" (Howard Dietz, Arthur Schwartz) - 6:05

== Personnel ==
- Frank Wess - flute, tenor saxophone
- Tommy Flanagan - piano
- Eddie Jones - bass
- Bobby Donaldson - drums
