= Salute to Satch =

Studio album by Joe Newman and His Orchestra
- Released: 1956
- Recorded: March 4, 11 & 14, 1956
- Studio: Webster Hall, New York City
- Genre: Jazz
- Length: 36:17
- Label: RCA Victor; LPM 1324
- Producer: Jack Lewis

Joe Newman chronology
New Sounds in Swing (1956)	Salute to Satch (1956)	I Feel Like a Newman (1956)

Salute to Satch is a tribute album to Louis Armstong by jazz trumpeter Joe Newman and His Orchestra recorded in 1956 for the RCA Victor label.

== Reception ==
Professional ratings
Review scores
Source	Rating
Allmusic	3/5 stars

Allmusic awarded the album 3 stars, stating "Newman makes a keen tribute to his mentor, featuring a tart big band".

== Track listing ==
1. "When the Saints Go Marching In" (Traditional) – 2:40
2. "Chinatown, My Chinatown" (Jean Schwartz, William Jerome) – 2:42
3. "West End Blues" (King Oliver) – 4:00
4. "Jeepers Creepers" (Harry Warren, Johnny Mercer) – 2:46
5. "Dipper Mouth Blues" (Oliver, Louis Armstrong) – 2:40
6. "When It's Sleepy Time Down South" (Clarence Muse, Leon René, Otis René) – 3:01
7. "Struttin' with Some Barbeque" (Lil Hardin Armstrong, Don Raye) – 2:40
8. "Pennies from Heaven" (Arthur Johnston, Johnny Burke) – 3:07
9. "Basin Street Blues" (Spencer Williams) – 3:30
10. "Back O'Town Blues" (Louis Armstrong, Luis Russell) – 3:46
11. "Sweethearts on Parade" (Carmen Lombardo, Charles Newman) – 2:13
12. "You Can Depend On Me" (Charles Carpenter, Louis Dunlap, Earl Hines) – 2:55
- Recorded at Webster Hall in New York City on March 4 (tracks 9–12), March 11 (tracks 3 & 6–8) and March 14 (tracks 1, 2, 4 & 5), 1956

== Personnel ==
- Joe Newman- trumpet, vocals
- Conte Candoli, Joe Ferrante, Bernie Glow, Ernie Royal (tracks 3 & 6–8), Nick Travis (tracks 1, 2, 4, 5 & 9–12) – trumpet
- Jimmy Cleveland, Urbie Green (tracks 1, 2, 4, 5 & 9–12), Fred Ohms (tracks 3 & 6–8), Tommy Mitchell (tracks 1, 2, 4, 5 & 9–12), Benny Powell (tracks 3 & 6–8), Chauncey Welsch – trombone
- Phil Woods, Sam Marowitz – alto saxophone
- Al Cohn – tenor saxophone, clarinet
- Eddie Wasserman – tenor saxophone
- Al Epstein – baritone saxophone
- Hank Jones (tracks 1, 2, 4, 5 & 9–12), Nat Pierce (tracks 3 & 6–8) – piano
- Barry Galbraith (tracks 9–12), Freddie Green (tracks 1–8) – guitar
- Buddy Jones (tracks 9–12), Eddie Jones (tracks 1–8) – bass
- Gus Johnson – drums
- Manny Albam (tracks 3 & 5–9), Al Cohn (track 1), Ernie Wilkins (tracks 2, 4 & 10–12
