= David Josefowitz =

British violinist and conductor (1918–2015)

David Josefowitz CBE (25 December 1918 – 10 January 2015) was a British violinist, conductor and music producer. He was the founder of the London Soloists Chamber Orchestra.

== Life ==
David Josefowitz, with his brother, Samuel Mulik Josefowitz (1921–2015), co-founded Concert Hall Society, Inc., a subscription-mail-order classical record label. David was an accomplished violinist and occasionally performed and composed under the pseudonym Jose Davido.

=== Education ===
After completing a year studying at Eidgenössische Technische Hochschule in Zürich, David Josefowitz was admitted as a sophomore around 1938 to the Massachusetts Institute of Technology, where he studied chemistry and played association football. He also pledged to the Sigma Alpha Mu fraternity at MIT in 1938. David Josefowitz was an expert in plastics and, in 1945, earned a PhD in Chemistry from the Polytechnic Institute of Brooklyn, which now is part of the New York University Tandon School of Engineering. David had also studied music (violin) at the Klindworth-Scharwenka Conservatory in Berlin.

== Family ==
David Josefowitz was born on 25 December 1918 in Kharkiv, Ukraine, to the marriage of Zelik Josefowitz (1884–1949) and Frieda Shur (maiden; 1890–1983). David married Tanya R. Kagan on 2 May 1949 in Manhattan.

== See also ==
- Concert Hall Society
