= Joe Newman (American musician) =

American jazz trumpeter (1922–1992)

- Born: Joseph Dwight Newman; September 7, 1922; New Orleans, Louisiana, U.S.
- Died: July 4, 1992 (aged 69) New York City, U.S.
- Genre: Jazz
- Occupations: Trumpeter, composer, educator

Joseph Dwight Newman (September 7, 1922 – July 4, 1992) was an American jazz trumpeter, composer, and educator, best known as a musician who worked with Count Basie during two periods.

== Early life and education ==
Newman was born in New Orleans, Louisiana, to Dwight, (pianist) and Louise Newman, a musical family, having his first music lessons from David Jones. He attended Alabama State College, where he joined the college band (the Bama State Collegians), became its leader, and took it on tour. There he was discovered by Lionel Hampton.

== Career ==
In 1941, he joined Lionel Hampton for two years, before signing with Count Basie, with whom he stayed for a total of thirteen years, interrupted by short breaks and a long period (1947–1952) spent first with saxophonist Illinois Jacquet and then drummer J. C. Heard. During his second period with Basie, which lasted for about nine years, he made a number of small-group recordings as the leader. He also played on Benny Goodman's 1962 tour of the Soviet Union.

In 1961, Newman left the Basie band and helped to found Jazz Interactions, of which he became president in 1967. His wife, Rigmor Alfredsson Newman, was the Executive Director. Jazz Interactions was a charitable organization which provided an information service, brought jazz master classes into schools and colleges, and later maintained its own Jazz Interaction Orchestra (for which Newman wrote).

In the 1970s and 1980s, Newman toured internationally and recorded for several record labels.

== Personal life ==
Newman suffered a stroke in 1991 which seriously disabled him, and he died at Mount Sinai Hospital in Manhattan, New York, of complications from the condition in 1992.

== Discography ==
=== As leader ===
- 1954: Joe Newman and His Band (Vanguard)
- 1954: Joe Newman and the Boys in the Band (Storyville)
- 1955: All I Wanna Do Is Swing (RCA Victor)
- 1955: The Count's Men (Jazztone) also released as Swing Lightly
- 1955: I'm Still Swinging (RCA Victor)
- 1956: New Sounds in Swing (Jazztone) with Billy Byers also released as Byers' Guide
- 1956: Salute to Satch (RCA Victor)
- 1956: I Feel Like a Newman (Storyville)
- 1956: The Midgets (Vik)
- 1957: Locking Horns (Rama) with Zoot Sims
- 1957: The Happy Cats (Coral)
- 1958: Soft Swingin' Jazz (Coral)
- 1958: Joe Newman with Woodwinds (Roulette)
- 1958: Counting Five in Sweden (Metronome) also released on World Pacific
- 1960: Jive at Five (Swingville)
- 1961: Good 'n' Groovy (Swingville)
- 1961: Joe's Hap'nin's (Swingville)
- 1961: Joe Newman Quintet at Count Basie's (Mercury)
- 1962: In a Mellow Mood (Stash)
- 196?: Shiny Stockings (Honey Dew)
- 1975: Satchmo Remembered (Atlantic)
- 1977: At the Atlantic (Phontastic)
- 1978: I Love My Baby (Black & Blue)
- 1984: Hangin' Out (Concord) with Joe Wilder
- 1989: Midgets (Panton)
- 1992: A Grand Night for Swingin': The Joe Newman Memorial Album (Natasha)
- 1994: Jazz for Playboys (Savoy)
- 1999: In Sweden (Jazz Information)
- 2003: Jazz in Paris: Jazz at Midnight (Sunnyside)

=== As sideman ===
With Manny Albam

- The Drum Suite (RCA Victor, 1956) with Ernie Wilkins
- Brass on Fire (Sold State, 1966)
- The Soul of the City (Solid State, 1966)

With Lorez Alexandria

- Early in the Morning (Argo, 1960)

With Gene Ammons

- Twisting the Jug (Prestige, 1961) - with Jack McDuff

With the Count Basie Orchestra

- The Count! (Clef, 1952 [1955])
- Basie Jazz (Clef, 1952 [1954])
- The Swinging Count! (Clef 1952 [1956])
- Dance Session (Clef, 1953)
- Dance Session Album#2 (Clef, 1954)
- Basie (Clef, 1954)
- Count Basie Swings, Joe Williams Sings (Clef, 1955) with Joe Williams
- April in Paris (Verve, 1956)
- The Greatest!! Count Basie Plays, Joe Williams Sings Standards with Joe Williams
- Metronome All-Stars 1956 (Clef, 1956) with Ella Fitzgerald and Joe Williams
- Hall of Fame (Verve, 1956 [1959])
- Basie in London (Verve, 1956)
- One O'Clock Jump (Verve, 1957) with Joe Williams and Ella Fitzgerald
- Count Basie at Newport (Verve, 1957)
- The Atomic Mr. Basie (Roulette, 1957) aka Basie and E=MC^{2}
- Basie Plays Hefti (Roulette, 1958)
- Sing Along with Basie (Roulette, 1958) - with Joe Williams and Lambert, Hendricks & Ross
- Basie One More Time (Roulette, 1959)
- Breakfast Dance and Barbecue (Roulette, 1959)
- Everyday I Have the Blues (Roulette, 1959) - with Joe Williams
- Dance Along with Basie (Roulette, 1959)
- Not Now, I'll Tell You When (Roulette, 1960)
- The Count Basie Story (Roulette, 1960)
- Kansas City Suite (Roulette, 1960)
- Back with Basie (Roulette, 1962)
- High Voltage (MPS, 1970)

With Louis Bellson and Gene Krupa

- The Mighty Two (Roulette, 1963)

With Bob Brookmeyer

- Jazz Is a Kick (Mercury, 1960)
- Gloomy Sunday and Other Bright Moments (Verve, 1961)

With Ray Bryant

- Dancing the Big Twist (Columbia, 1961)
- MCMLXX (Atlantic, 1970) - guest on 1 track

With Benny Carter

- 'Live and Well in Japan! (Pablo Live, 1978)

With Buck Clayton

- The Huckle-Buck and Robbins' Nest (Columbia, 1954)
- How Hi the Fi (Columbia, 1954)
- Jumpin' at the Woodside (Columbia, 1955)
- All the Cats Join In (Columbia 1956)
- Jam Session #1 (Chiaroscuro, 1974)
- Jam Session #2 (Chiaroscuro, 1975)

With Arnett Cobb

- Keep On Pushin' (Bee Hive, 1984)

With Al Cohn

- Mr. Music (RCA Victor, 1955)
- The Natural Seven (RCA Victor, 1955)
- That Old Feeling (RCA Victor, 1955)
- Four Brass One Tenor (RCA Victor, 1955)

With Hank Crawford

- Double Cross (Atlantic, 1968)
- Mr. Blues Plays Lady Soul (Atlantic, 1969)

With Eddie "Lockjaw" Davis

- Count Basie Presents Eddie Davis Trio + Joe Newman (Roulette, 1958) with Count Basie

With Bo Diddley

- Big Bad Bo (Chess, 1974)

With Dexter Gordon

- Swiss Nights Vol. 3 (SteepleChase, 1975 [1979]) - guest on 1 track

With Freddie Green

- Mr. Rhythm (RCA Victor, 1955)

With Al Grey

- The Last of the Big Plungers (Argo, 1959)
- The Thinking Man’s Trombone (Argo, 1960)

With Eddie Harris

- The Electrifying Eddie Harris (Atlantic, 1967)
- Plug Me In (Atlantic, 1968)
- Silver Cycles (Atlantic, 1968)

With Coleman Hawkins

- Things Ain't What They Used to Be (Swingville, 1961) as part of the Prestige Swing Festival

With Johnny Hodges

- Sandy's Gone (Verve, 1963)

With Milt Jackson

- Plenty, Plenty Soul (Atlantic, 1957)

With Illinois Jacquet

- The King! (Prestige, 1968)
- The Soul Explosion (Prestige, 1969)

With Eddie Jefferson

- Things Are Getting Better (Muse, 1974)

With Budd Johnson

- Off the Wall (Argo, 1964)

With J. J. Johnson

- Broadway Express (RCA Victor, 1965)

With Etta Jones

- Etta Jones Sings (Roulette, 1965)

With Quincy Jones

- The Birth of a Band! (Mercury, 1959)
- Golden Boy (Mercury, 1964)
- I/We Had a Ball (Limelight, 1965)
- Quincy Plays for Pussycats (Mercury, 1959–65 [1965])

With Irene Kral

- SteveIreneo! (United Artists, 1959)

With Yusef Lateef

- Part of the Search (Atlantic, 1973)

With Mundell Lowe

- Satan in High Heels (soundtrack) (Charlie Parker, 1961)

With Junior Mance

- I Believe to My Soul (Atlantic, 1968)

With Herbie Mann

- Latin Mann (Columbia, 1965)
- Our Mann Flute (Atlantic, 1966)

With Jack McDuff

- The Fourth Dimension (Cadet, 1974)

With Gary McFarland

- The Jazz Version of "How to Succeed in Business without Really Trying" (Verve, 1962)
- Tijuana Jazz (Impulse!, 1965) with Clark Terry
- Profiles (Impulse!, 1966)

With Jimmy McGriff

- The Big Band (Solid State, 1966)
- A Bag Full of Blues (Solid State, 1967)

With Jay McShann

- The Last of the Blue Devils (Atlantic, 1978)

With the Modern Jazz Quartet

- Plastic Dreams (Atlantic, 1971)

With James Moody

- Moody and the Brass Figures (Milestone, 1966)

With Oliver Nelson

- Main Stem (Prestige, 1962)
- Oliver Nelson Plays Michelle (Impulse!, 1966)
- Happenings with Hank Jones (Impulse!, 1966)
- Encyclopedia of Jazz (Verve, 1966)
- The Sound of Feeling (Verve, 1966)

With David "Fathead" Newman

- Bigger & Better (Atlantic, 1968)

With Buddy Rich

- The Wailing Buddy Rich (Norgran, 1955)

With Jerome Richardson

- Groove Merchant (Verve, 1968)

With Shirley Scott

- Roll 'Em: Shirley Scott Plays the Big Bands (Impulse!, 1966)

With Jimmy Smith

- Hoochie Coochie Man (Verve, 1966)

With Dakota Staton

- I Want a Country Man (Groove Merchant, 1973)

With Sonny Stitt

- Kaleidoscope (Prestige, 1952 [1957])
- Sonny Stitt Plays Arrangements from the Pen of Quincy Jones (Roost, 1955)
- The Matadors Meet the Bull (Roulette, 1965)
- I Keep Comin' Back! (Roulette, 1966)
- The Champ (Muse Records, 1973)

With Clark Terry and Chico O'Farrill

- Spanish Rice (Impulse!, 1966)

With Eddie "Cleanhead" Vinson

- Clean Head's Back in Town (Bethlehem, 1957)

With Frank Wess

- Jazz for Playboys (Savoy, 1957)

With Larry Willis

- A New Kind of Soul (LLP, 1970)

With Kai Winding

- Kai Olé (Verve, 1961)
