= Spanish Rice (album) =

Studio album by Clark Terry and Chico O'Farrill
- Released: 1966
- Recorded: July 18, 19 & 20, 1966
- Genre: Jazz
- Length: 33:43
- Label: Impulse!
- Producer: Bob Thiele

Clark Terry chronology
| Gingerbread Men (1966) | Spanish Rice (1966) | It's What's Happenin' (1966) |

Spanish Rice is an album by American jazz trumpeter Clark Terry and Cuban composer-arranger Chico O'Farrill featuring performances recorded in 1966 for the Impulse! label.

== Reception ==
The Allmusic review by Ken Dryden awarded the album 3 stars stating "This is a fun recording that had the potential to be a memorable one, but it falls a bit short".

Professional ratings
Review scores
| Source | Rating |
|---|---|
| Allmusic | 3/5 stars |
| The Penguin Guide to Jazz Recordings | 3/4 stars |

== Track listing ==
1. "The Peanut Vendor" (Moises Simons) – 2:18
2. "Angelitos Negros" (Andres Eloy Blanco, Manuel Alvarez Maciste) – 2:41
3. "El Cumbanchero" (Rafael Hernández Marín) – 2:12
4. "Jooni" (Clark Terry) – 3:37
5. "Que Sera" (Tito Puente) – 2:45
6. "Mexican hat dance (traditional) – 2:42
7. "Spanish Rice" (Chico O'Farrill, Clark Terry) – 2:47
8. "Say "Si Si"" (Ernesto Lecuona, Francia Luban, Al Stillman) – 2:30
9. "Macarena (La Virgen de la Macarena)" (Bernardo Bautista Monterde) – 3:02
10. "Tin Tin Deo" (Gil Fuller, Chano Pozo) – 2:46
11. "Contigo en la Distancia" (César Portillo de la Luz) – 3:02
12. "Happiness Is" (Paul Evans, Paul Parnes) – 3:21

- Recorded in New York City on July 18, 1966 (tracks 2, 6, 8 & 10), July 19, 1966 (tracks 3, 5, 9 & 11) and July 20, 1966 (tracks 1, 4, 7 & 12)

== Personnel ==
- Clark Terry - trumpet, flugelhorn
- Chico O'Farrill - arranger, conductor
- Joe Newman, Ernie Royal, Snooky Young - trumpet, flugelhorn
- Everett Barksdale, Barry Galbraith - guitar
- George Duvivier - bass
- Julio Cruz, Frank Malabe - percussion
