= Jolly Roger Records =

- Parent company: Paradox Industries
- Founded: 1950
- Founder: Dante Bollettino
- Genre: Bootleg
- Country of origin: United States
- Location: New York City

Jolly Roger Records was a New York City-based bootleg record label active briefly in the early 1950s. It was founded by an enthusiast of early blues and jazz music named Dante Bollettino (sometimes misspelled Bolletino).

== History ==
Bollettino began releasing new music on 78 rpm discs in the late 1940s, including as manager of the label Paradox Industries, which was active from 1948 to 1952 and released music from, among others, Ray Burke and Knocky Parker. He was also a record collector, and noted that many early jazz and blues recordings by musicians such as Louis Armstrong, Bessie Smith, and Jelly Roll Morton were out of print and unavailable except as difficult-to-find used copies. He then founded Pax Records to press discs himself, reissuing recordings from obscure musicians such as Cripple Clarence Lofton. He also started the label British Rhythm Society for reissues.

His next label, Jolly Roger, was founded in 1950 to compile historic out-of-print recordings from major jazz and blues musicians recorded by RCA and Columbia. He contracted with RCA's own custom pressing plant to manufacture the discs. Jolly Roger was one of several labels operating in American cities such as New York, Los Angeles, and Cleveland which in the 1950s issued compilations of early 78 rpm recordings without authorization from the companies that had produced the originals. Rather than reissue them on 78 rpm shellac discs, Bollettino issued them on the new 10-inch, 33 rpm vinyl record, which put dispersed recordings into a single collection for the first time and made them available in a more durable commercial format. Burt Goldblatt designed an album cover for Jolly Roger which was used for a Billie Holiday reissue. By mid-1951, according to historian Adrian Johns, "Jolly Roger was easily the most prominent of all the 'pirate' labels."

Bollettino's activities drew the attention of Columbia Records and Louis Armstrong; in early 1951, Columbia released its own compiled reissue of Armstrong's 1920s-era recordings. At the time Bollettino was operating, sound recordings were not eligible for federal copyright under United States copyright law; only the musical composition underlying the recording was eligible, and a mechanical license was available to Bollettino to release performances of the compositions without permission by paying a flat fee. Bollettino paid royalties for new recordings he commissioned with the profits from Jolly Roger's reissues. However, he did not pay royalties on all of the reissue recordings, and in 1952, the American Federation of Musicians blacklisted Paradox Industries and its subsidiary labels. Columbia then sued Bollettino in New York state court in February 1952, seeking an injunction for unfair competition. Bollettino initially fought the ruling, but was fined $5,000 for copyright infringement, and eventually settled, remarking, "My lawyer insisted that we had a good case and could win, but I knew the record companies would feel they couldn't afford to lose and would throw in everything they had. I was only twenty-three at the time and didn't have the money for a long, expensive court case, so I settled."

== Aftermath ==
Bollettino saw himself as a catalyst of the reissue business, noting later in his life, "afterwards the big companies began to reissue more jazz records, so maybe I accomplished something after all." The legal battles over Jolly Roger's output, which attracted major newspaper and magazine attention in the early 1950s, were used by the recording industry as evidence to Congress that stronger copyright protection was needed. The Recording Industry Association of America (RIAA) was founded in 1951 partly as a response to record piracy incidents at this time. Anti-piracy statutes were implemented in many states in the 1960s, and in 1971, a federal copyright law was passed which made recordings created after February 15, 1972, eligible for copyright protection.
