= Ernie Wilkins =

American jazz musician (1922–1999)

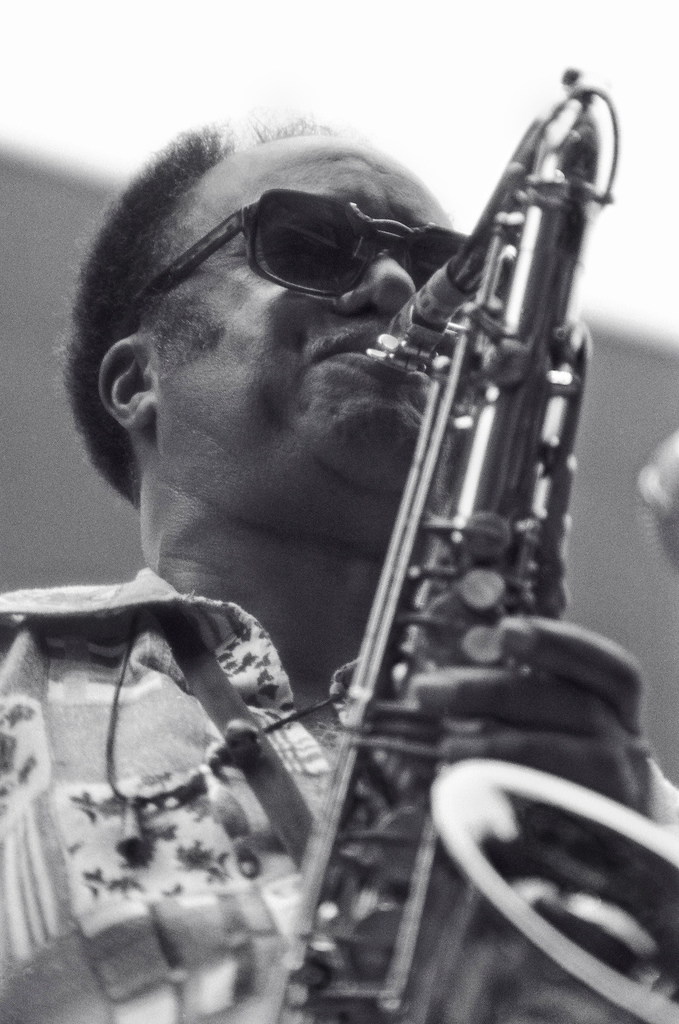
- New York City, July 6, 1976

Background information
- Born: Ernest Brooks Wilkins Jr. July 20, 1922; St. Louis, Missouri
- Died: June 5, 1999 (aged 76) Copenhagen, Denmark
- Genres: Jazz, swing
- Occupations: Musician, arranger, composer
- Instrument: Saxophone

Ernest Brooks Wilkins Jr. (July 20, 1922 – June 5, 1999) was an American jazz saxophonist, conductor and arranger who spent several years with Count Basie. He composed for Tommy Dorsey, Clark Terry, and Dizzy Gillespie. He was musical director for albums by Nat Adderley, Dinah Washington, Sarah Vaughan, and Buddy Rich.

== Early life ==
Ernest Brooks Wilkins Jr. was born on July 20, 1922 in St. Louis, Missouri. He attended Summer High School with his brother, Jimmy Wilkins. Ernie then studied in Wilberforce University and eventually ended up in the navy where he played in a band with Gerald Wilson, led by Willie Smith.

== Career ==
After his military service, Wilkins joined piano virtuoso Earl Hines's last big band in 1948. In 1949-1950, Wilkins recorded with George Hudson's band and did two sessions with backing Dinah Washington with the Teddy Stewart Orchestra. In 1951, Wilkins was introduced to Count Bassie by his friend Clark Terry. The conversation took place in a steam room where Basie told Terry he was in need of an alto saxophonist; Terry immediately thought of Wilkins and reached out to him, asking him to join the band and “bring his alto,” despite Wilkins being primarily a tenor player at the time. Ernie's involvement helped Basie's band move to the top of the charts.

Wilkins's first major arrangement for Basie in 1955 was “Every Day I Have the Blues”, a song originally written for vocalist Joe Williams that became a defining hit and one of the best-selling jazz records of all time. Other notable songs that Wilkins created for the Basie group included “Basie Power”, “Way Out Basie”, and “Right On, Right On".

In the late 1950s, Wilkins performed with and arranged music for Gillespie’s band, and later wrote for Tommy Dorsey's and Harry James' orchestras. Ernie Wilkins provided the arrangements for The Count Basie/Sarah Vaughan Sessions which featured Frank Wess, Joe Newman, Snooky Young, Billy Mitchell, Al Grey, Freddie Green and Marshal Royal, along with Jones and Foster. He also arranged music for celebrated artists like Sarah Vaughan.

In 1959 Ernie Wilkins collaborated with Melba Liston to write music as she toured Europe with the musical Free and Easy in the Quincy Jones orchestra.

== Personal life ==
In the 1960s Wilkins faced personal challenges, which included a heroin addiction that led to a temporary decline in his career. Many stopped offering him work due to his struggles, but Clark Terry continued to support him by inviting him to collaborate on several projects throughout the 1970s in his group Big B-A-D Band. In the band Wilkins became a music director and principal composer. In the band Wilkins recorded music and also featured in a four-minute solo on "One Foot in the Gutter". Wilkins remained in the band throughout the 1970s. From 1971 to 1973 Wilkins was also the head of the artists and repertory division of Mainstream Records. Wilkins eventually overcame his addiction, returning to prominence as a composer and arranger.

== Final years in Denmark ==
In 1980, Wilkins assembled a 13-piece ensemble called the Almost Big Band. The idea was partly inspired by his wife Jenny.

Ernie Wilkins and Clark Terry recorded albums in Denmark and appeared at the Montreux Jazz Festival in 1983. In the same year he went to Paris to record some of his compositions with an all-star lineup, which included former colleagues from the Count Basie Orchestra. In January 1991 Wilkins visited England to conduct the Danish Radio Big Band in a performance of his works, including the recently rediscovered Suite for Jazz Band, a composition written 30 years prior. This concert in Croydon was recorded and released on the Hep label.

Ernie Wilkins died in Copenhagen on June 5, 1999, following a stroke.

He has a street named after him in southern Copenhagen, "Ernie Wilkins Vej" (Ernie Wilkins Street).

== Awards and honors ==
- 1981 Ben Webster Prize

== Discography ==
- Kenny Clarke & Ernie Wilkins (Savoy, 1955) with Kenny Clarke
- Flutes & Reeds (Savoy, 1955)
- Top Brass (Savoy, 1955)
- Trumpet Album (Savoy, 1955)
- The Drum Suite (RCA Victor, 1956) with Manny Albam
- Day In, Day Out (1960)
- The Big New Band of the '60s (Fresh Sound, 1960)
- Here Comes the Swingin' Mr. Wilkins (Everest, 1960)$
- Ernie Wilkins & the Almost Big Band (Storyville, 1980)
- Almost Big Band Live (Matrix Music Marketing, 1981)
- Live! At the Slukefter Jazz Club (Matrix Music Marketing, 1981)
- Montreux (SteepleChase, 1983)
- On the Roll (SteepleChase, 1986)
- Kaleidoduke (Polygram, 1995)
- Hard Mother Blues (P-Vine, 2007)
- Kinda Dukish (Gazell, 2012)

=== As sideman/arranger ===
With Count Basie

- Dance Session (Clef, 1953)
- Basie Jazz (Clef, 1954) – recorded in 1952
- The Count! (Clef, 1955) – recorded in 1952
- Dance Session Album#2 (Clef, 1954)
- Basie (Clef, 1954)

With Louis Bellson

- Let's Call It Swing (Verve, 1957)
- Drummer's Holiday (Verve, 1958)

With DR Big Band

- Suite for Jazz Band (Hep, 1992) – guest conductor, recorded in 1991

With Rob Franken

- Fender Rhodes (Sonic Scenery, 2009) – compilations recorded in 1973-76 & 2009

With Maynard Ferguson

- Maynard '63 (Roulette, 1962)

With Dizzy Gillespie

- Jazz Recital (Norgran, 1955)
- World Statesman (Norgran, 1956)
- Dizzy in Greece (Verve, 1957)

With Al Grey

- Struttin' and Shoutin' (Columbia, 1983) – recorded in 1975

With Joe Newman

- All I Wanna Do Is Swing (RCA Victor, 1955)
- Soft Swingin' Jazz (Coral, 1958)

=== As composer/arranger ===
With Ernestine Anderson

- My Kinda Swing (Mercury, 1960)

With Count Basie

- Count Basie Swings, Joe Williams Sings (Clef, 1955) with Joe Williams
- April in Paris (Verve, 1956)
- Metronome All-Stars 1956 (Clef, 1956) with Ella Fitzgerald and Joe Williams
- One O'Clock Jump (Verve, 1957) with Joe Williams and Ella Fitzgerald
- Me and You (Pablo, 1983)

With Ray Brown

- Ray Brown with the All-Star Big Band (Verve, 1962)

With Kenny Clarke

- Telefunken Blues (Savoy, 1955)

With Jimmy Cleveland

- Cleveland Style (EmArcy, 1958)
- A Map of Jimmy Cleveland (Mercury, 1959)

With Al Cohn

- The Natural Seven (RCA Victor LPM 1116, 1955)
- That Old Feeling (RCA Victor LPM 1207, 1955)

With Eddie "Lockjaw" Davis

- Trane Whistle (Prestige, 1960)

With Maynard Ferguson

- Maynard '62 (Roulette, 1962)

With Dizzy Gillespie

- Birks' Works (Verve, 1957)

With Freddie Green

- Mr. Rhythm (RCA Victor, 1955)

With Milt Jackson

- Big Bags (Riverside, 1962)

With Harry James

- Wild About Harry! (Capitol T/ST-874, 1957)
- The New James (Capitol T/ST-1037, 1958)
- Harry's Choice! (Capitol T/ST-1093, 1958)
- Harry James and His New Swingin' Band (MGM E/SE-3778, 1959)
- Harry James...Today! (MGM E/SE-3848, 1960)
- The Spectacular Sound Of Harry James (MGM E/SE-3897, 1961)
- The Solid Gold Trumpet Of Harry James (MGM E/SE-4058, 1962)
- Harry James Twenty-fifth Anniversary Album (MGM E/SE-4214, 1964)
- The King James Version (Sheffield Lab LAB 3, 1976)
- Comin' From A Good Place (Sheffield Lab LAB 6, 1977)

With Quincy Jones

- The Great Wide World of Quincy Jones (Mercury, 1959)

With Sam Jones

- Down Home (Riverside, 1962)

With Mark Murphy

- Rah (Riverside, 1961)

With Charles McPherson

- Siku Ya Bibi (Day of the Lady) (Mainstream, 1972)
- Today's Man (Mainstream, 1973)

With Joe Newman

- The Count's Men (Jazztone, 1955)
- Salute to Satch (RCA Victor, 1956)
- I Feel Like a Newman (Storyville, 1956)
- The Midgets (Vik, 1956)
- The Happy Cats (Coral, 1957)
- Joe Newman with Woodwinds (Roulette, 1958)

With Herb Pomeroy

- The Band and I (United Artists, 1958) with Irene Kral

With Rex Stewart and Cootie Williams

- The Big Challenge (Jazztone, 1957)

With Sarah Vaughan and the Count Basie Orchestra

- Count Basie/Sarah Vaughan (Roulette, 1960)

With Dinah Washington

- In the Land of Hi-Fi (EmArcy, 1956)

With Eddie "Cleanhead" Vinson

- Clean Head's Back in Town (Bethlehem, 1957)

With Charles Williams

- Stickball (Mainstream, 1972)
