= Concert Hall Society =

US record production and distribution company

Concert Hall Society Handel Society Opera Society Chamber Music Society Musical Masterpiece Society Jazztone Society
- Founded: September 19, 1956 (70 years ago)
- Founder: Sam & David Josefowitz
- Genre: Classical, jazz, pop
- Country of origin: United States; Western Europe
- Location: New York City, New York, U.S.

Concert Hall Society, Inc., was a New York City-based membership-subscription-oriented record production and distribution company founded in 1946 by Samuel Mulik Josefowitz (1921–2015) and David Josefowitz (1918–2015), brothers. The New York office was located at 250 West 57th Street in Manhattan. The Josefowitz's sold Concert Hall Society in 1956 to Crowell-Collier Publishing Company. The name Concert Hall Society was also one of several labels owned by the company.

== History ==
Principal founders
Samuel and David Josefowitz's father, Zachar Josefowitz (1884–1949), owned a large piece of land in Maine that the United States government used for its earliest research in atomic energy, which generated income that helped finance the founding of Concert Hall Society, Inc. Samuel earned a bachelor's degree in industrial engineering in 1942 from Rensselaer Polytechnic Institute. David Josefowitz was an expert in plastics and had a PhD in Chemistry from the Polytechnic Institute of Brooklyn, which now is part of the New York University Tandon School of Engineering. Samuel Josefowitz was born in Anykščiai, Lithuania. David Josefowitz was born in Kharkov, Ukraine. Samuel was an accomplished amateur classical pianist and David was an accomplished violinist. David occasionally composed under the pseudonym Jose Davido.

Impetus for founding the company
Sam and David Josefowitz, with their father as President – while running their family chemical business on Long Island – were offered a 20-ton consignment of vinyl resin, raw material for manufacturing record disks, at a bargain price. Given their love of music and their expertise in chemistry and manufacturing, they pondered the idea of producing classical music records and distributing them through a mail-order record club.

Concert Hall Society, Inc.
Concert Hall Society, Inc., was incorporated in New York in September 1956.

Sale by founding principals to Crowell-Collier
In July 1956, the Josefowitz's sold Concert Hall Society and four record clubs to Crowell-Collier Publishing Company. The four record clubs were (i) Musical Masterpiece Society, (ii) Jazztone Society, (iii) Chamber Music Society, and (iv) Opera Society. At the time of the sale, the company had a combined mailing list of 600,000 LP record buyers. Over 1,000 recordings were included in the transaction. Concert Hall Society reported that its membership had reach 275,000 as of February 10, 1963.

Current status
The entity is, as of 2018, still an active entity, but incorporated as a Delaware corporation and registered in New York as a foreign corporation. Its registered address is:

Concert Hall Society, Inc.
640 Fifth Avenue
New York, New York 10019

== Subsidiaries and sub-labels ==
=== Handel Society ===
The Handel Society was a record label established in 1951 by the Concert Hall Society.

=== Opera Society ===
The Opera Society, Inc., began producing records of opera in 1953.

=== Chamber Music Society ===
Chamber Music Society was established as a membership record label in 1952. The Chamber Music Society disks were pressed on red vinyl. The first offerings, CM-1 through CM-27 have a reputation for ultra quiet surfaces and excellent engineering. The inner sleeves were of a non-scratching "glassine" material and the jackets were a fine weave over cardboard....a class act for the 1950s. The musical selections were the lesser known chamber pieces from a wide range of eras from Bach to Bartok, Mozart to Stravinsky...18 hours in this 27 albums on 32 disks (CM-8 has 3 disks, CM-12,18 and 23 each have 2).

=== Musical Masterpiece Society ===
The Musical Masterpiece Society (MMS) (nl) was a European-based subsidiary of Concert Hall Society founded in 1952. Like Concert Hall Society, MMS was distributed to subscribers, but unlike Concert Hall, subscribers did not have to commit to a fixed number of records. MMS initially focused on the standard classical repertoire, which, from a marketing perspective, made the label an attractive alternative for subscribers who wanted to build a new collection. A Musical Masterpiece disc often sold for 50% less than one of a premium label disc. MMS issued savings stamps to subscribers as part of its "Grammoclub."

The Musical Masterpiece Society was originally named the Musical Masterwork Society. But after Columbia Records claimed use of the "Masterwork" tag, the Josefowitz brothers agreed in 1953 to switch to its present name.

In the mid-1950s, MMS had offices in Amsterdam on Paulus Potterstraat (nl) and a branch office in Utrecht. The MMS brand disappeared from the market in the early-1960s.

Musical Masterpiece Society labels

- Dutch: Muzikale Meesterwerken Serie
- Sweden and Finland: Gala International
- Netherlands and Belgium: Populaire Platen Kring (PPK)
- United Kingdom: Pop Parade
- Italy: Music Hall Internazionale

=== Vargal ===
- Paris: Gala des Variétés
- Switzerland: Grammoclub ex Libris

=== Jazztone Society ===
The Jazztone Society (nl) was the jazz mail-order subscription subsidiary of Concert Hall Society, Inc. Jazztone began in around 1955 with mail-order rights to Milt Gabler's old Commodore catalog. Concert Hall Society also acquired Dial Records in 1954. Jazztone was distributed in French language markets as Guilde du Jazz. The Jazztone Society was the first independent mail-order jazz record club in the United States. Columbia's Record Club, Columbia House, which included a jazz division, was the second. Jazz at the Philharmonic, established in 1955 and launched the following year by Norman Granz, was the third. Jazztone not only re-issued the Dial catalog, but also produced its own.

George T. Simon — jazz journalist, drummer, brother of Richard L. Simon, co-founder of Simon & Schuster, and uncle of singer-songwriter Carly Simon — ran Jazztone from 1956, when it was sold to Crowell-Collier, through 1957.

Jazztone re-issued recordings from the catalogs of Fantasy, Pacific Jazz, Vanguard, Storyville, Commodore, Urania, Period, Roost, Victor (out of catalog recordings), Dial (acquired by Concert Hall Society), Black & White (defunct), Purist, (Note: Purist Records were produced by the London-based Bunk Johnson Appreciation Society between 1954 and 1963.) Paradox, Jazz Information, Black Deuce, (Note: Black Deuce Records was a bootleg label that likely had been operated by Teddy Reig and Herman Lubinsky.) and Okidoke. (Note: Okidoke was one of some 53 bootleg labels operated by Boris Rose (1918–2000), an amateur engineer, expert radio recording hobbyist, and major record collector. He owned over 100,000 records. Rose recorded from AM radio many of Charlie Parker broadcasts during his primacy. Rose is highly lauded for having preserved Parker's early broadcasts.)

Selected artists, re-issued by Jazztone

- Henry "Red" Allen
- Ivie Anderson (Black & White)
- Sidney Bechet
- Clifford Brown
- Dave Brubeck (Fantasy)
- Eddie Condon (Commodore, Comet)
- Pee Wee Erwin (Urania)
- Erroll Garner (Dial, Comet)
- Stan Getz (Roost)
- Dizzy Gillespie (Dial, Black Deuce, Okidoke)
- Benny Goodman (Commodore)
- Dexter Gordon (Dial)
- Marty Grosz (Jolly Roger)
- Coleman Hawkins (Commodore, Comet, Melrose, (Note: The Melrose label only recorded three sessions, all in New York and all in 1945 – one led by Buck Clayton, one by Bobby Hackett, and one by Hot Lips Page. The sessions were produced by Melvin Rose, who owned the label and the masters.) Dial)
- Billie Holiday (Commodore)
- Lena Horne (Black & White)
- Cliff Jackson (Black & White)
- Bunk Johnson (Purist, Paradox, Jazz Information) (Note: The Jazz Information label was distributed by Commodore Records.)
- Jonah Jones (Black & White)
- Dodo Marmarosa (Dial)
- Red Norvo (Dial)
- Hot Lips Page (Melrose)
- Charlie Parker (Dial, Comet, Okidoke)
- Pee Wee Russell (Storyville, Disques Vogue)
- Rex Stewart (Commodore, Comet)
- Sonny Stitt (Roost)
- Art Tatum (Comet)
- Jack Teagarden
- Lee Wiley (Storyville)
- Cootie Williams
- Teddy Wilson (Dial)

Selected artists produced by Jazztone and/or Concert Hall Society

- Henry "Red" Allen
- Paul Barbarin
- Ruby Braff
- Billy Byers
- Joki Freund
- Lionel Hampton
- Coleman Hawkins
- Fletcher Henderson
- Jonah Jones
- Wolfgang Lauth (de) (1931–2011)
- Joe Newman
- Sammy Price
- Pee Wee Russell
- Sister Rosetta Tharpe
- Rex Stewart
- Cootie Williams
- Mary Lou Williams

=== Varieton ===
The Varieton label carried classical music that was more oriented towards lighter classical and chamber music.

=== Guilde Internationale du Disque ===
Guilde Internationale du Disque, founded in France in 1952, got its first subscription in 1953. The company also distributed in retail stores. Disks were pressed by Turicaphon AG. Sublabel: La Division Des Connaisseurs. In 1986, Guilde Internationale du Disque merged with Éditions Atlas (fr).

== Licensing affiliates ==
Nixa Records had a licensing arrangement with a number of American classical music record companies, including Concert Hall Records, to manufacture and market its catalogues in the United Kingdom and the British Commonwealth.

== Membership data ==
Concert Hall Society reported that its membership had reach 275,000 as of February 10, 1963.

== Selected discography ==
- Concert Hall Society's first release:

Prokofiev's String Quartet No. 2 in F major
Gordon String Quartet: Jacques Gordon (1897–1948), 1st violin; Urico Michael Rossi (1916–2001), 2nd violin; David Paul Dawson (1913–1975), viola; Fritz Magg, cello
Liner notes: Kurt List (1913–1970)

- William Horne, tenor, recorded an album of Kurt Weill's songs under the composer's supervision. The recording is the first known performance of the music.

Chamber Music Society (CMS)initial offering, CM-1 Giuseppe Tartini, Sonata in G minor. Francesco Geminiani, Sonata in B flat major. Antonio Vivaldi, Sonatas in A major and F minor. Tomaso Vitali, Chaconne in G minor. Ricardo Odnoposoff, Violin Leo Rostal, Cello Benjamin Oren, Harpsichord Heinz Wehrle, Harpsichord and Organ. Chamber Music Society CM Series finale, CM-27. Arcangelo Correlli Number One in D Major - Number Three in C Minor Number Two in F Major - Number Four in D Major Number Eight in C Minor the Christmas Concerto. Boyd Neel Chamber Orch. Walter Goehr, Conductor Winterhur Chamber Orch. Clemens Dahinden, Cond.

== Other mail-order subscription record clubs ==
- Columbia Record Club
- Musical Heritage Society
- Britannia Music Club
- World Record Club
