= Chico O'Farrill =

Cuban composer and musician (1921–2001)

- Also known as: "Chico"
- Born: Arturo O'Farrill; October 28, 1921; Havana, Cuba
- Died: June 27, 2001 (aged 79) New York, United States
- Genres: Latin jazz; Afro-Cuban jazz; blues; mambo
- Occupations: Musician; composer; arranger; conductor
- Years active: 1949–2001
- Labels: Clef; Norgran; Verve; Impulse!; Milestone

Arturo "Chico" O'Farrill (October 28, 1921 – June 27, 2001) was a Cuban composer, arranger, and conductor, best known for his work in the Latin idiom, specifically Afro-Cuban jazz or "Cubop", although he also composed traditional jazz pieces and even symphonic works.

Born to an aristocratic Cuban family, he played the trumpet early in his career. He composed works for Machito (Afro-Cuban suite with Charlie Parker, 1950) and Benny Goodman's Bebop Orchestra ("Undercurrent Blues"), and arranged for Dizzy Gillespie and Stan Kenton, among others.

In the 1990s, O'Farrill led a big band that took up residence at New York's Birdland nightclub. Chico's son, pianist Arturo O'Farrill, eventually took over the band.

== Biography ==
O'Farrill was born in Havana, Cuba. He was raised to follow family tradition and enter into law practice, though before he could, he became enamored with jazz music and pursued that instead. He discovered big band jazz when he attended military boarding school in Florida, where he first learned to play the trumpet, and after returning to Havana began studying classical music under Felix Guerrero at the Havana Conservatory and playing in local nightclubs alongside figures like Isidro Perez and Armando Romeu. In 1948, he relocated to New York City, where he continued his classical music studies under Stefan Wolpe, Bernard Wagenaar, and others at the Juilliard School, and began to pursue the jazz scene in his free time.

Soon after moving to New York City, he began working as an arranger for Benny Goodman, and wrote "Undercurrent Blues". It was at this point his nickname was born: Goodman had trouble pronouncing his name, and began referring to him as "Chico" instead. During this period, he also worked as an arranger with Stan Kenton (Cuban Episode), Count Basie, Art Farmer, and Machito (the Afro-Cuban Jazz Suite feat. Charlie Parker, recorded on December 21, 1950), and contributed to several Afro-Cuban jazz works by Charlie Parker and Dizzy Gillespie (Manteca Theme, recorded on May 24, 1954). He also started his own band, the Afro-Cuban Jazz Orchestra, during this time, which toured the country, recorded, and played weekly gigs at the Birdland jazz club. In 1957, he moved to Mexico and lived with his wife, singer Lupe Valero, until 1965; while there he wrote a suite for Art Farmer in 1959 and performed concerts in Mexico City.

In 1965, he returned to New York City, where he worked as an arranger and music director for CBS on their TV program "The CBS Festival of Lively Arts for Young People." He also wrote arrangements of pop songs for Count Basie in 1965 and 1966, and recorded Spanish Rice, an album of his Afro-Cuban jazz compositions, with Clark Terry in 1966.

From the 1970s through the mid-1990s, O'Farrill was largely absent from the jazz scene: he was technically active during this period, but the work he released diminished further and further. He wrote scores for Stan Kenton and Art Barbieri during the early part of this inactive period, as well as some for Machito and Dizzy Gillespie's jazz orchestra.

O'Farrill did, however, make a comeback as a band leader in the jazz world with the 1995 release of the Grammy-nominated album Pure Emotion, which marked the first time he'd recorded as a leader in nearly 30 years—though he did lead a 17-piece Afro-Cuban orchestra at the Blue Note Jazz Club in New York City a year before, and arranged several songs for David Bowie's jazz-inspired 1993 album Black Tie White Noise, predicting his return. He was also commissioned to write a trumpet concerto for Wynton Marsalis at this time. From 1995 though his retirement in March 2001, shortly before his death from complications from pneumonia, his band, which included his son Arturo O'Farrill as pianist and, later, de facto leader, recorded two more albums (The Heart of a Legend in 1999 and Carambola in 2000) for Milestone Records, and returned to playing weekly at Birdland. After his retirement, his son continued to lead the band, releasing albums such as Noche Involvidable in 2005 and Song for Chico in 2008.

== Musical style ==
While O'Farrill is primarily known as a prominent figure in the creation and propagation of Afro-Cuban jazz, he was much more preoccupied with jazz than the actual melodic content of Cuban music. As quoted by Bob Blumenthal in the liner notes to Pure Emotion: "It was never my primary interest to preserve the authenticity of Cuban melody and harmonies just for the sake of preservation. When I started my career in the Forties, a lot of Cuban music was very simplistic. I was always more interested in jazz; and when I got to New York, I naturally gravitated to Dizzy and other bebop artists, that fusion of Cuban music with the jazz techniques of harmonic richness and orchestration. Of course, I have been determined to preserve Cuban rhythms, and I always have the rhythm section in mind when I write. You have to write horn parts that don't collide with the rhythmic concept." This is indicative of O'Farrill's general compositional style: he is heavily associated with the Latin idiom in jazz, but his works are typically closer to more mainstream American big band jazz in melody and harmony, and mostly incorporate Cuban music in the rhythms. In fact, it is Chico O'Farrill who is credited with first introducing the clave to jazz band rhythm sections.

Owing to his strict conservatory education, first at the Havana Conservatory and then the Juilliard School, O'Farrill composed in a highly strict, tightly-organized fashion. His pieces are constructed down to minute details, and while improvisation is a hallmark of many jazz styles, his works use a minimum of it; Ben Ratliff, writing for The New York Times, describes his work as "cinematic", saying that the music is "complicated and leaves little to chance."

O'Farrill's style is best described as a fusion of the Cuban music he heard growing up, the jazz music that he became enamored with in school, and the European classical music he studied in conservatories, and it is best summarized in his Afro-Cuban Jazz Suite. Even just the title alludes to the inclusion of these three elements, and several movements are inspired by music of a Latin idiom (Canción, Mambo, Rhumba Abierta), while others are more jazz-inspired (6/8, Jazz), and all are brought together under the orderly form of a European suite. O'Farrill states about this piece, "I was never an expert on Cuban music. What I did, for example, in that suite was purely instinctive [...] They asked me, 'write a suite, Chico,' [so] I just wrote according to my best understanding, letting my jazz sensibility to [sic] guide me most of the time."

== Critical reception ==
Todd Barkan, O'Farrill's manager and record producer from his 90s comeback on, notes in his obituary that O'Farrill "felt a good measure of appreciation for his contributions. The interest that surrounded his work when he returned to recording in the '90s exceeded everything that he had experienced up until that point." Two of the three albums released after his 1990s return were nominated for Grammy awards, and he was featured in the Latin jazz film Calle 54. In a review of Pure Emotion, Paul Verna writes for Billboard, "The return of veteran composer/arranger Chico O'Farrill should earn an enthusiastic welcome for devotees of swinging, straight-ahead Latin jazz."

Few glowing records exist of O'Farrill's works from before the 1990s, but Peter Watrous, writing a review of a 1998 Afro-Cuban jazz concert featuring O'Farrill's older work (specifically, the Manteca Suite composed for Dizzy Gillespie and the Afro-Cuban Jazz Suite) for The New York Times, calls O'Farrill "a gifted musician who stands as one of jazz's great cultural translators", lauding the concert as "[making] the case for [his] brilliance."

== Discography ==
- Jazz (Clef, 1953)
- Afro-Cuban (Clef, 1953)
- 2nd Afro Cuban Suite (Norgran, 1954)
- Mambo Dance Session (Norgran, 1954)
- Latino Dance Session (Norgran, 1954)
- Chico's Cha Cha Cha (Panart, 1956)
- Music from South America (Verve, 1956)
- Mambo Latino Dances (Verve, 1958)
- Nine Flags (Impulse!, 1966)
- Spanish Rice with Clark Terry (Impulse!, 1966)
- Married Well (Verve, 1967)
- Cuban Jazz King (Eco 1973)
- Latin Roots (Philips, 1976)
- Super Chops (Versatile, 1977)
- Guaguasi (Kim, 1984)
- Pure Emotion (Milestone, 1995)
- Heart of a Legend (Milestone, 1999)
- Carambola (Milestone, 2000)
- The Complete Norman Granz Recordings (Malanga Music, 2016)
- Chico O'Farrill (Calle Mayor, 2017)
