= Mel Lewis and Friends =

Studio album by Mel Lewis
- Released: 1977
- Recorded: June 8 & 9, 1976
- Studio: Generation Sound Studios, New York City
- Genre: Jazz
- Length: 45:53
- Label: A&M/Horizon; SP-716
- Producer: John Snyder

Mel Lewis chronology
Greetings and Salutations (1975)	Mel Lewis and Friends (1977)	The Thad Jones Mel Lewis Quartet (1978)

Mel Lewis and Friends is an album by drummer/bandleader Mel Lewis recorded in 1976 and released by the Horizon label the following year.

== Reception ==
Professional ratings
Review scores
Source	Rating
Allmusic	4.5/5 stars

Allmusic awarded the album 4 1/2 stars with the review by Scott Yanow stating "A rare small group date led by drummer Mel Lewis ... the music still communicates quite well. Trumpeter Freddie Hubbard is in top form during five selections; tenor saxophonist Michael Brecker and Gregory Herbert (mostly on alto) get in their licks; pianist Hank Jones and bassist Ron Carter are typically flawless, and trumpeter Cecil Bridgewater makes a guest appearance ... Excellent music".

== Track listing ==
All compositions by Thad Jones except where noted

1. "Ain't Nothin' Nu" − 7:51
2. "A Child Is Born" − 6:35
3. "Moose the Mooche" (Charlie Parker) − 8:06
4. "De Samba" (Ron Carter) − 5:53
5. "Windflower" (Sarah Cassey) − 6:12
6. "Sho' Nuff Did" − 10:19
7. "Mel Lewis - Rhythm" (Mel Lewis) − 0:34

== Personnel ==
- Mel Lewis − drums
- Freddie Hubbard − trumpet, flugelhorn (tracks 1–4 & 6)
- Cecil Bridgewater − trumpet (track 6)
- Gregory Herbert − alto saxophone, tenor saxophone (tracks 1, 3, 4 & 6)
- Michael Brecker − tenor saxophone (tracks: 1, 3, 4 & 6)
- Hank Jones − piano
- Ron Carter − bass
