= The Complete Poland Concerts 1976 & 1978 =

The Complete Poland Concerts...

Live album by Thad Jones / Mel Lewis Jazz Orchestra
- Released: 2009
- Recorded: 1976 August 6 (Sopot) and 1978 October 26 (Warsaw), Poland and 1978 October 2 (Berlin), Germany
- Genre: Jazz
- Length: 136:31
- Label: Gambit

1976 Concert LP
- Polish LP Poljazz ZSX 637

1978 Concert LP
- Polish LP Poljazz ZSX 697

The Complete Poland Concerts, 1976 and 1978 is a compilation of the complete live recordings made by the Thad Jones / Mel Lewis Jazz Orchestra in Poland in August 1976 and October 1978. Two additional tracks from a 1978 Berlin concert round out the album.

== Release history ==
Most of the 1978 Poland concert tracks and the two Berlin tracks were previously released outside Poland on WestWind Jazz releases, A Touch of Class and Body and Soul respectively. The 1976 Sopot (Jazz Jantar) tracks had previously been available only on a domestic Polish release from PolJazz.

== Track listing ==
Disc 1:

1. "Fingers" (T. Jones) – 14:05
2. "Thank You" (J. Dodgion) – 6:55
3. "Take a Ladder" (R. Scott) – 8:50
4. "Greetings and Salutations" (T. Jones) – 13:50
5. "A Child Is Born" – 9:45
6. "Intimacy of the Blues" (Strayhorn) – 16:25

Disc 2:

1. "Quietude" (Jones) – 7:26
2. "Samba Con Get Chu" (Brookmeyer) – 13:35
3. "Cecilia Is Love" (Foster) – 7:06
4. "I Love You" (Porter) – 5:57
5. "And I Love You So" (McLean) – 7:33
6. "That's Freedom" (Jones) – 9:14
7. "Fingers" – 14:14

Tracks 1.1 - 1.4 previously released on Poljazz LP ZSX 637
Tracks 1.5 and 1.6 previously released on Body and Soul, West Wind Jazz WW2048
Tracks 2.1 - 2.3 and 2.7 previously released on Poljazz LP ZSX 697
Tracks 2.1 - 2.6 previously released on A Touch of Class, West Wind Jazz WW2402

== Personnel ==
- Thad Jones – flugelhorn
- Mel Lewis – drums
- John Mosca – trombone

1976 Sopot: Disc 1 tracks 1–4

- Harold Danko – piano
- Dwight R. Bowman – bass
- Edward I. Xiques – alto saxophone
- Jerry D. Dodgion – alto saxophone
- Arnold L. Schneider – tenor saxophone
- Gregory D. Herbert – tenor saxophone
- Pepper Adams – baritone saxophone
- Al Porcino – trumpet
- Earl Gardner – trumpet
- Frank Gordon – trumpet
- Lynn Nicholson – trumpet
- William M. Campbell – trombone
- Clifford A. Adams – trombone
- Earl P. McIntyre – trombone

1978 Berlin: Disc 1 tracks 5–6; 1978 Warsaw: Disc 2

- Jim McNeely – piano
- Jasper Lundgaard – bass
- Dick Oatts – alto saxophone
- Steve Coleman – alto saxophone
- Rick Perry – tenor saxophone
- Robert Rockwell – tenor saxophone
- Charles Davis – baritone saxophone
- Ron Tooley – trumpet
- Simo Salminin – trumpet
- Irvin Stokes – trumpet
- Larry Moss – trumpet
- Doug Purviance – trombone
- Lolly Bienenfeld – trombone
- Lu Robertson – trombone
