= Monday Night =

Live album by The Thad Jones/Mel Lewis Orchestra
- Released: 1968
- Recorded: October 1968
- Venue: Village Vanguard, New York City
- Genre: Jazz
- Label: Solid State

The Thad Jones/Mel Lewis Orchestra chronology
The Big Band Sound... Featuring Miss Ruth Brown (1968)	Monday Night (1968)	Central Park North (1969)

Professional ratings
Review scores
Source	Rating
AllMusic	3/5 stars

Monday Night, Recorded Live at the Village Vanguard is a 1968 big band jazz album recorded at the Village Vanguard in New York City by The Thad Jones/Mel Lewis Orchestra and released on the Solid State Records. All tracks are included on Mosaic's limited edition boxed set, The Complete Solid State Recordings of the Thad Jones/Mel Lewis Orchestra.

== Track listing ==
LP side A:

1. "Mornin' Reverend"
2. "Kids Are Pretty People"
3. "St. Louis Blues"

LP side B:

1. "The Waltz You 'Swang' For Me"
2. "Say It Softly"
3. "The Second Race"

== Personnel ==
- Thad Jones – flugelhorn
- Mel Lewis – drums
- Roland Hanna – piano
- Richard Davis – bass
- Jerome Richardson – alto saxophone, soprano saxophone
- Jerry Dodgion – alto saxophone
- Seldon Powell – tenor saxophone
- Eddie Daniels – tenor saxophone
- Pepper Adams – baritone saxophone
- Richard Willams – trumpet
- Snooky Young – trumpet
- Danny Moore – trumpet
- Jimmy Nottingham – trumpet
- Jimmy Knepper – trombone
- Garnett Brown – trombone
- Jimmy Cleveland – trombone
- Cliff Heather – trombone
