= Live at the Village Vanguard (The Thad Jones/Mel Lewis Orchestra album) =

Live album by Thad Jones/Mel Lewis Jazz Orchestra
- Released: 1967
- Recorded: 1967 April, The Village Vanguard, New York City
- Genre: Jazz
- Length: 49:26
- Label: Solid State

Thad Jones/Mel Lewis Jazz Orchestra chronology
Presenting Joe Williams and Thad Jones/Mel Lewis,... (1966)	Live at the Village Vanguard (1967)	Jazz Casual,... (1968)

alternative cover

alternative cover
- LRC Ltd CD re-issue

alternative cover
- Laserlight CD re-issue

Professional ratings
Review scores
Source	Rating
Allmusic	3/5 stars
The Penguin Guide to Jazz Recordings	3/4 stars

Live at the Village Vanguard is a 1967 big band jazz album recorded by the Thad Jones/Mel Lewis Jazz Orchestra and released on the Solid State Records label. The album was nominated for a 1967 Grammy Award in the "Best Instrumental Jazz Performance - Large Group..." category. All tracks are also included on Mosaic's limited edition boxed set, The Complete Solid State Recordings of the Thad Jones/Mel Lewis Orchestra and seven tracks were also re-issued in the 1990s on CD as Volume 3 of LRC Ltd.'s (and Laserlight's) series Village Vanguard Live Sessions.

== Track listing ==
LP side A:

1. "The Little Pixie" – 10:34
2. "A- That's Freedom" (H. Jones) – 7:01
3. "Bachafillen" (Brown) – 7:08

LP side B:

1. "Don't Git Sassy" – 7:22
2. "Willow Tree" (Razaf, Waller) – 5:04
3. "Samba Con Getchu" (Brookmeyer) – 12:17

Bonus tracks added to later Blue Note CD reissue:

7. "Quietude" – 4:48
8. "The Second Race" – 9:37
9. "Lover Man" (Davis, Ramirez, Sherman) – 4:53

All songs by Thad Jones except as noted.

== Personnel ==
- Thad Jones – flugelhorn
- Mel Lewis – drums
- Roland Hanna – piano
- Richard Davis – bass
- Sam Herman – guitar
- Jerome Richardson – alto saxophone, soprano saxophone, clarinet, flute
- Jerry Dodgion – alto saxophone, flute
- Joe Farrell – tenor saxophone, flute
- Eddie Daniels – tenor saxophone, clarinet
- Pepper Adams – baritone saxophone, clarinet
- Richard Williams – trumpet
- Bill Berry – trumpet
- Snooky Young – trumpet
- Marvin Stamm – trumpet
- Jimmy Nottingham – trumpet
- Bob Brookmeyer – trombone
- Garnett Brown – trombone
- Tom McIntosh – trombone
- Cliff Heather – trombone
