= Cecil Bridgewater =

American jazz trumpeter (born 1942)

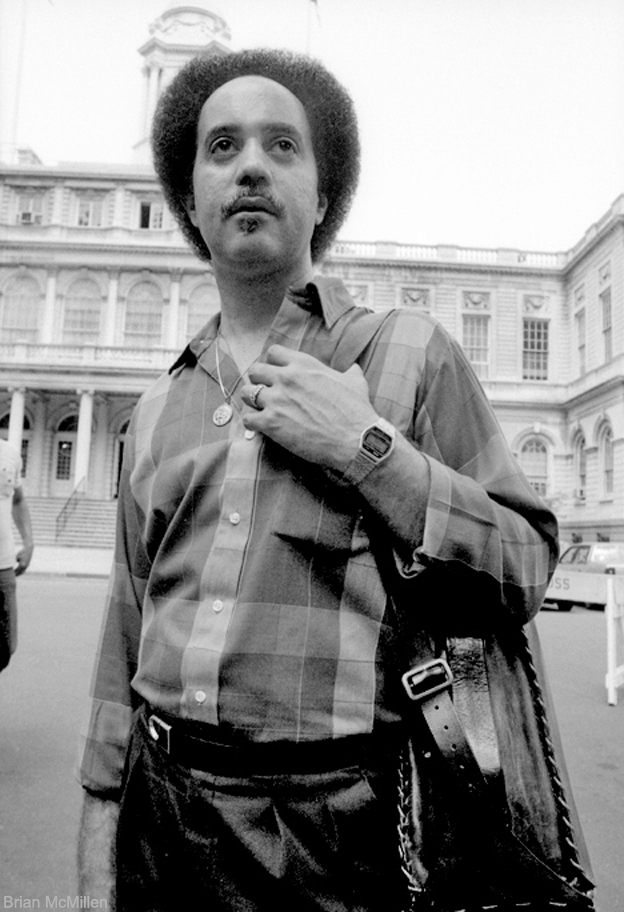
- Bridgewater in 1984

Background information
- Born: October 10, 1942 (age 82); Urbana, Illinois, USA
- Genres: hard bop
- Instrument: trumpet
- Years active: 1969-present

Cecil Bridgewater (born October 10, 1942) is an American jazz trumpeter and composer.

== Biography ==
Bridgewater was born in Urbana, Illinois and studied at the University of Illinois. He and brother Ron formed the Bridgewater Brothers Band in 1969, and in the 1970s he was married to Dee Dee Bridgewater. In 1970, he played with Horace Silver, and following this with Thad Jones and Mel Lewis from 1970 to 1976. Also in the 1970s, he played with Max Roach, starting a decades-long association. Elsewhere he has played with Dizzy Gillespie, Art Blakey, Randy Weston, Charles McPherson, Joe Henderson, Roy Brooks, Abdullah Ibrahim and Sam Rivers. Bridgewater's first disc as a leader appeared in 1993. Bridgewater has also composed works premiered by the Cleveland Chamber Orchestra and Meet the Composer.

Cecil Bridgewater has become a great supporter of The Jazz Foundation of America in their mission to save the homes and the lives of America's elderly jazz and blues musicians including musicians that survived Hurricane Katrina. Cecil performed at the 2008 Benefit Concert, "A Great Night in Harlem" at the Apollo Theater.

He currently teaches as adjunct faculty at Manhattan School of Music, New School, William Paterson University, and The Juilliard School.

== Discography ==
=== As leader ===
- I Love Your Smile (Blue Moon, 1992)
- Mean What You Say (Brownstone, 1997)

=== As sideman ===
With Muhal Richard Abrams

- The Hearinga Suite (Black Saint, 1989)

With Anthony Braxton

- Creative Orchestra Music 1976 (Arista, 1976)

With Jon Faddis and Billy Harper

- Jon & Billy (Trio, 1974)

With Frank Foster

- The Loud Minority (Mainstream, 1972)

With O'Donel Levy

- Dawn of a New Day (Groove Merchant, 1973)
- Simba (Groove Merchant, 1974)

With Mel Lewis

- Mel Lewis and Friends (A&M/Horizon, 1977)

With Charles McPherson

- Today's Man (Mainstream, 1973)

With Jimmy Owens

- Headin' Home (A&M/Horizon, 1978)

With Houston Person

- Houston Express (Prestige, 1970)
- The Talk of the Town (Muse, 1987)

With Max Roach

- Lift Every Voice and Sing (Atlantic, 1971)
- Pictures in a Frame (Soul Note, 1979)
- In the Light (Soul Note, 1982)
- Live at Vielharmonie (Soul Note, 1983)
- It's Christmas Again (Soul Note, 1984)
- Easy Winners (Soul Note, 1985)
- Bright Moments (Soul Note, 1986)
- To the Max! (Enja, 1990–91)

With Horace Silver

- Total Response (Blue Note, 1971)
- All (Blue Note, 1972)

Both above albums compiled on The United States of Mind (Blue Note, 2004)

With Lonnie Liston Smith

- Visions of a New World (RCA/Flying Dutchman, 1975)

With Dakota Staton

- I Want a Country Man (Groove Merchant, 1973)

With John Stubblefield

- Confessin' (Soul Note, 1984)

With Buddy Terry

- Awareness (Mainstream, 1971)

With The Thad Jones / Mel Lewis Orchestra

- Suite for Pops (A&M/Horizon, 1972)
- Live in Tokyo (Denon Jazz, 1974)
- Potpourri (Philadelphia International, 1974)
- Thad Jones / Mel Lewis and Manuel De Sica (Pausa, 1974)
- New Life (A&M/Horizon, 1976)
- Thad Jones / Mel Lewis Orchestra With Rhoda Scott (Barclay, 1976)

With Mickey Tucker

- Mister Mysterious (Muse, 1978)

With McCoy Tyner

- Song of the New World (Milestone, 1973)
- Inner Voices (Milestone, 1977)

With Dee Dee Bridgewater

- Afro Blue (Trio, 1974)
