= Mean What You Say (Thad Jones/Pepper Adams Quintet album) =

Studio album by Thad Jones/Pepper Adams Quintet
- Released: 1966
- Recorded: April 26 and May 4 & 9, 1966
- Studio: Plaza Sound Studios, New York City
- Genre: Jazz
- Length: 40:41
- Label: Milestone; MSP 9001
- Producer: Orrin Keepnews

Thad Jones chronology
Opening Night (1966)	Mean What You Say (1966)	Presenting Thad Jones/Mel Lewis and the Jazz Orchestra (1966)

Pepper Adams chronology
Pepper Adams Plays the Compositions of Charlie Mingus (1963)	Mean What You Say (1966)	Encounter! (1968)

Mean What You Say is an album by the Thad Jones/Pepper Adams Quintet recorded in 1966 and released on the Milestone label.

== Reception ==
Professional ratings
Review scores
Source	Rating
Allmusic	4.5/5 stars
The Rolling Stone Jazz Record Guide	4/5 stars
The Penguin Guide to Jazz Recordings	3/4 stars

Scott Yanow of Allmusic called the band a "high-quality hard bop unit" and stated "Jones and Adams always made for a potent team, but the rise of the Thad Jones/Mel Lewis Orchestra meant that this particular quintet only lasted a short time".

== Track listing ==
All compositions by Thad Jones except where noted.

1. "Mean What You Say" – 4:36
2. "H and T Blues" – 7:42
3. "Wives and Lovers" (Burt Bacharach, Hal David) – 4:55
4. "Bossa Nova Ova" – 3:23
5. "No Refill" – 4:38
6. "Little Waltz" (Ron Carter) – 6:30
7. "Chant" (Duke Pearson) – 5:20
8. "Yes Sir, That's My Baby" (Walter Donaldson, Gus Kahn) – 4:06

== Personnel ==
- Thad Jones – flugelhorn
- Pepper Adams – baritone saxophone
- Duke Pearson – piano
- Ron Carter – bass
- Mel Lewis – drums
