= Consummation (The Thad Jones/Mel Lewis Orchestra album) =

Studio album by Thad Jones/Mel Lewis Jazz Orchestra
- Released: 1970
- Recorded: January 20–21, 28 & May 25, 1970
- Studios: A&R Studios, New York City
- Genre: Jazz
- Length: 46:32
- Label: Solid State (Blue Note)
- Producer: Sonny Lester

Thad Jones/Mel Lewis Jazz Orchestra chronology
Basle, 1969 (1969)	Consummation (1970)	Live in Tokyo (1974)

Alternate cover
- Solid State SR 3110 (Japan. release)

Professional ratings
Review scores
Source	Rating
Allmusic	4.5/5 stars
DownBeat	5/5 stars
Jack Bowers (All About Jazz)	favorable
The Penguin Guide to Jazz	(Core Collection)

Consummation is an album by the Thad Jones/Mel Lewis Jazz Orchestra. It was released in 1970 on Blue Note Records and re-released in 2002. It was recorded at A&R Studios in New York City. The album was nominated for a 1970 Grammy Award in the "Best Jazz Performance - Large Group..." category. All tracks were included in Mosaic's limited edition boxed set, The Complete Solid State Recordings of the Thad Jones/Mel Lewis Orchestra.

== Reception ==
Richard Cook and Brian Morton gave Consummation a four-star review in The Penguin Guide to Jazz, and included it in the book's Core Collection. Cook and Morton described the recording as "one of the best big-band records of its day and some kind of proof that the bands weren't completely dead."

== Track listing ==
All compositions and arrangements are by Thad Jones.

LP side A:

1. "Dedication" – 5:13
2. "It Only Happens Every Time" – 3:07
3. "Tiptoe" – 6:42
4. "A Child Is Born" – 4:09
5. "Us" – 3:37

LP side B:

1. "Ahunk Ahunk" – 7:57
2. "Fingers" – 10:38
3. "Consummation" – 5:09

== Personnel ==
- Thad Jones – flugelhorn
- Snooky Young – lead trumpet
- Danny Moore – trumpet
- Al Porcino – trumpet
- Marvin Stamm – trumpet
- Eddie Bert – trombone
- Benny Powell – trombone
- Jimmy Knepper – trombone
- Cliff Heather – bass trombone
- Jerome Richardson – lead soprano saxophone, alto saxophone, flute, alto flute
- Jerry Dodgion – alto saxophone, clarinet, flute, alto flute
- Billy Harper – tenor saxophone, flute
- Eddie Daniels – tenor saxophone, clarinet, flute
- Richie Kamuca – baritone saxophone (tracks A1, 2, 3, 5, B3), clarinet
- Pepper Adams – baritone saxophone (tracks A4, B1)
- Joe Farrell – baritone saxophone (track B2)
- Roland Hanna – acoustic piano, electric piano
- Richard Davis – acoustic bass, electric bass
- Mel Lewis – drums
- Jimmy Buffington - French horn, tracks A1, B3
- Earl Chapin - French horn, tracks A1, B3
- Dick Berg - French horn, tracks A1, B3
- Julius Watkins - French horn, tracks A1, B3
- Howard Johnson - tuba, tracks A1, B3
- David Spinozza - guitar, tracks A5, B1
