= Central Park North (album) =

Studio album by Thad Jones/Mel Lewis Jazz Orchestra
- Released: 1969
- Recorded: June 17 and 18, 1969
- Studio: A&R Studios, New York City
- Genre: Jazz
- Length: 37:28
- Label: Solid State
- Producer: Sonny Lester

Thad Jones/Mel Lewis Jazz Orchestra chronology
Monday Night (1968)	Central Park North (1969)	Basle, 1969 (1969)

Professional ratings
Review scores
Source	Rating
Allmusic	4/5 stars
The Penguin Guide to Jazz Recordings	3/4 stars

Central Park North is a 1969 big band jazz album recorded by the Thad Jones/Mel Lewis Jazz Orchestra and released on the Solid State Records label. The album was nominated for a 1969 Grammy Award in the "Best Instrumental Jazz Performance - Large Group..." category. All tracks are also included on Mosaic's limited edition boxed set, The Complete Solid State Recordings of the Thad Jones/Mel Lewis Orchestra.

== Track listing ==
All songs composed and arranged by Thad Jones except where indicated.

LP side A:

1. "Tow Away Zone" – 4:25
2. "Quietude" – 4:03
3. "Jive Samba" (Nat Adderley) – 8:50

LP side B:

1. "The Groove Merchant" (Jerome Richardson) – 5:04
2. "Big Dipper" – 5:52
3. "Central Park North" – 9:14

== Personnel ==
- Thad Jones – flugelhorn
- Mel Lewis – drums
- Roland Hanna – piano
- Richard Davis – bass
- Barry Galbraith – guitar
- Sam Brown – guitar
- Jerome Richardson – alto saxophone
- Jerry Dodgion – alto saxophone
- Joe Farrell – tenor saxophone
- Eddie Daniels – tenor saxophone
- Joe Temperley – baritone saxophone
- Snooky Young – trumpet
- Richard Williams – trumpet
- Danny Moore – trumpet
- Jimmy Nottingham – trumpet
- Jimmy Knepper – trombone
- Benny Powell – trombone
- Eddie Bert – trombone
- Cliff Heather – trombone

== References and external Links ==
- Solid State SS-18058
- Central Park North at:
  - Allmusic
  - discogs.com
