= New Life (The Thad Jones/Mel Lewis Orchestra album) =

Studio album by Thad Jones/Mel Lewis Jazz Orchestra
- Released: 1976
- Recorded: July 22, 1975, January 10, December 16–17, 1976
- Studio: A&R Recording, Inc., New York City
- Genre: Jazz
- Length: 44:21
- Label: A&M / Horizon
- Producer: John Snyder

Thad Jones/Mel Lewis Jazz Orchestra chronology
Suite for Pops (1975)	New Life (1976)	Thad Jones/Mel Lewis Orchestra With Rhoda Scott (1976)

Professional ratings
Review scores
Source	Rating
Allmusic	2.5/5 stars

New Life (Dedicated to Max Gordon) is a 1976 big band jazz album recorded by the Thad Jones/Mel Lewis Jazz Orchestra and released on the A&M/Horizon Records label. The album was nominated for a 1976 Grammy award in the Best Jazz Performance by a Big Band category.

== Track listing ==
All songs composed and arranged by Thad Jones except where noted.

Side A

1. "Greetings And Salutations" – 8:49
2. "Love And Harmony" (comp./arr. C. Bridgewater) – 7:23
3. "Little Rascal On A Rock" – 6:17

Side B

1. "Forever Lasting" – 5:50
2. "Love To One Is One To Love" – 4:07
3. "Thank You" (comp./arr. Dodgion) – 6:10
4. "Cherry Juice" – 5:45

== Personnel ==
- Thad Jones – flugelhorn (tracks A2, A3, B1-4)
- Mel Lewis – drums
- Herb Lovelle – drums (tracks B1, B2)
- Roland Hanna – piano (tracks A1, A2, B1-3)
- Walter Norris – piano (tracks A3, B2, B4)
- George Mraz – bass (tracks A1-3, B3, B4)
- Steve Gilmore – acoustic bass (tracks B1, B2)
- Rasan Mfalme (Jerry Jemmott) – electric bass (track B1)
- Barry Finnerty – electric guitar (track A1)
- David Spinozza – electric guitar (track B1)
- Leonard Gibbs – congas (tracks A1, B1)
- Jerry Dodgion – alto saxophone, flute, soprano saxophone
- Frank Foster – tenor saxophone, clarinet (tracks A1-3, B3, B4)
- Lou Marini – clarinet, flute, tenor saxophone (tracks A1 (intro), B1, B2)
- Greg Herbert – tenor saxophone, flute
- Ed Xiques – soprano saxophone, alto saxophone, flute, clarinet
- Pepper Adams – baritone saxophone
- Al Porcino – trumpet (tracks A1-3, B3, B4)
- Jon Faddis – trumpet (tracks B1, B2)
- Lew Soloff – trumpet (tracks B1, B2)
- Waymon Reed – trumpet (tracks A1-3, B3, B4)
- Steve Furtado – trumpet (tracks B1, B2)
- Sinclair Acey – trumpet (tracks A1-3, B3, B4)
- Jim Bossy – trumpet (tracks B1, B2)
- Cecil Bridgewater – trumpet
- Billy Campbell – trombone
- Janice Robinson – trombone
- Earl McIntyre – bass trombone (tracks A1-3, B3, B4), trombone (tracks B1, B2)
- John Mosca – trombone (tracks A1-3, B3, B4)
- Dave Taylor – bass trombone (tracks B1, B2)
- Jim Buffington – French horn (tracks A1, B1, B2)
- Ray Alonge – French horn (tracks A1, B1, B2)
- Peter Gordon – French horn (tracks A1, B1, B2)
- Earl Chapin – French horn (tracks B1, B2)
- Julius Watkins – French horn (track A1)
- Don Butterfield – tuba (tracks B1, B2)
