= Jazz Casual – Thad Jones/Mel Lewis Orchestra and Woody Herman and His Swinging Herd =

Ralph Gleason's Jazz Casual (Jones/Lewis & Herman)

Studio album by Thad Jones / Mel Lewis Jazz Orchestra, Woody Herman and his Swinging Herd
- Released: 2001
- Recorded: 1963 (Herman) and 1968 April 22 (Jones / Lewis), KQED TV, San Francisco
- Genre: Jazz
- Length: 58:01
- Producer: Ralph Gleason

Thad Jones / Mel Lewis Jazz Orchestra chronology
Live at the Village Vanguard (1967)	Ralph Gleason's Jazz Casual... (1968)	The Big Band Sound... Featuring Miss Ruth Brown (1968)

Ralph Gleason's Jazz Casual (Jones/Lewis & Herman)

Video by Thad Jones / Mel Lewis Jazz Orchestra, Woody Herman and his Swinging Herd
- Recorded: 1963 (Herman) and 1968 April 22 (Jones / Lewis), KQED TV, San Francisco
- Genre: Jazz
- Length: 58:01
- Label: Idem
- Producer: Ralph Gleason

Alternate compilation / release
- same Jones/Lewis Band material combined with a Dave Brubeck and an MJQ performance

Alternate compilation / release
- same Woody Herman Band material combined with additional Herman Band performances

Jazz Casual - The Thad Jones / Mel Lewis Jazz Orchestra, Woody Herman and his Swinging Herd consists of a recording of a Woody Herman and his Swinging Herd appearance from 1963 and a Thad Jones / Mel Lewis Jazz Orchestra appearance from 1968 that were combined and released as a single DVD video and also as an audio CD. Jazz Casual was a KQED-produced television show of studio performances by major jazz musicians. The same material has also been released in different packages (e.g. a DVD of the Jones/Lewis Orchestra tracks combined with the 1961 appearance of the Dave Brubeck Quartet and the 1962 Modern Jazz Quartet appearance and another DVD including all 3 Woody Herman appearances from 1963 and 1964 which were both also part of an 8 DVD complete set of all 28 Jazz Casual TV episodes.)

== Track listing ==
1. "Just Blues" – 4:41
2. Thad Jones, Introductions – 0:36
3. "St.Louis Blues" – 12:18
4. Interview With Thad, Mel, Section Leader – 4:07
5. "Kids Are Pretty People" – 5:39
6. "Don't Get Sassy" – 1:05
7. "Molasses" – 6:30
8. Interview – 4:43
9. "El Toro Grande" – 4:52
10. Woody Speaks – 0:21
11. "Lonesome Old Town" – 3:42
12. Woody Speaks – 0:22
13. "That's Where It Is" – 4:06
14. "Cousins" – 4:18

Tracks 1–6: Thad Jones / Mel Lewis Jazz Orchestra
Tracks 7–14: Woody Herman and his Swinging Herd

== Personnel ==
Thad Jones / Mel Lewis Jazz Orchestra:

- Thad Jones – flugelhorn
- Jerome Richardson – alto saxophone
- Jerry Dodgion – alto saxophone
- Eddie Daniels – tenor saxophone
- Seldon Powell – tenor saxophone
- Pepper Adams – baritone saxophone
- Snooky Young – trumpet
- Richard Williams – trumpet
- Randy Brecker – trumpet
- Danny Moore – trumpet
- Bob Brookmeyer – trombone
- Garnett Brown – trombone
- Jimmy Knepper – trombone
- Benny Powell – trombone
- Roland Hanna – piano
- Richard Davis – bass
- Mel Lewis – drums

Woody Herman and his Swinging Herd:

- Woody Herman – clarinet, saxophone
- Bill Chase – trumpet
- Billy Hunt – trumpet
- Dave Dale – trumpet
- Phil Wilson – trombone
- Henry Southall – trombone
- Kenny Wenzel – trombone
- Sal Nistico – tenor sax
- Carmen Leggio – tenor sax
- Jackie Stevens – tenor sax
- Frank Hittner – baritone sax
- Nat Pierce – piano
- Chuck Andrus – bass
- Jake Hanna – drums
