= A Child Is Born (jazz standard) =

1969 instrumental and song

Song by Thad Jones & Mel Lewis

from the album Consummation
- Written: 1969
- Genre: Jazz
- Length: 4:09
- Label: Solid State
- Composer: Thad Jones
- Lyricist: Alec Wilder
- Producer: Sonny Lester

"A Child Is Born" is a 1969 jazz song written by Thad Jones, based on a tune by Roland Hanna. Alec Wilder independently added lyrics after hearing the recording. It has become a jazz standard with many recordings.

== Composition ==
The song was written in 1969 by the jazz trumpeter Thad Jones based on a tune by pianist Roland Hanna.

Roland Hanna improvised the song at the piano between sets with The Thad Jones/Mel Lewis Orchestra. The band would often improvise off of what Hanna played. Over several weeks at the Village Vanguard, Hanna developed the tune with the band.

One night, Jones came in with a full arrangement for the band. Hanna asked, "Is this my tune?" Jones replied, "No, it's mine."

Hanna recognized Jones was doing what every band leader does, writing down material that comes out of the unit. Hanna had no hard feelings about Jones taking credit for the song, since he was the one who wrote it down. Hanna "gifted it to Thad". After hearing the band play it one night at the Vanguard, Alec Wilder went back to the Algonquin Hotel and wrote lyrics for it. It is considered his best independent lyric.

== Lyrics ==
Now, out of the night
New as the dawn
Into the light
This Child
Innocent Child
Soft as a fawn
This Child is born

One small heart
One pair of eyes
One work of art
Here in my arms
Here he lies
Trusting and warm
Blessed this morn
A Child is born

== Form ==
"A Child Is Born" is a waltz. Jazz soloists often shorten it so that the form is only 30 bars. The original was recorded in B-flat major with a long piano introduction. The melody is anchored by repeated low Ds that occasionally climb an octave to the higher D, creating a sense of two distinct vocal registers.

== Recordings ==
"A Child Is Born" was first recorded with Roland Hanna on piano in Richard Davis' band for his 1969 album Muses for Richard Davis. The track begins with Hanna intoning three low B♭s on the piano and saying, "A child is born...Thad Jones". Thad Jones & Mel Lewis recorded it the following year for their 1970 album Consummation.

The Singers Unlimited recorded it on In Tune, their 1971 collaboration with Oscar Peterson's trio. Their version is wordless. One of the first recordings with Wilder's lyrics was on The Free Design's 1972 album There Is a Song. Tony Bennett recorded it with Bill Evans on their 1977 album Together Again. Guitarist Stanley Jordan also covered the instrumental as the closing track on his 1985 album Magic Touch.

It has been frequently recorded as both an instrumental and with Wilder's lyrics by artists like Stanley Turrentine and Bill Evans (also released on Christmas with Sinatra & Friends), Richard Davis, Kenny Burrell, Dee Dee Bridgewater, Hank Jones, and Helen Merrill.

The song was included in a revue of Alec Wilder's music called "Clues to a Life". It ran for 20 performances at the Vineyard Theatre in 1982, and a cast album was released.
