= Basle, 1969 =

Live album by Thad Jones/Mel Lewis Jazz Orchestra
- Released: 1996
- Recorded: 1969 September, Basle, Switzerland
- Genre: Jazz
- Length: 67:46
- Label: TCB Music

Thad Jones/Mel Lewis Jazz Orchestra chronology
Central Park North (1969)	Basle, 1969 (1996)	Consummation (1970)

Alternative cover
- LRC release

Professional ratings
Review scores
Source	Rating
Allmusic (link)	4/5 stars
Jack Bowers (allaboutjazz.com)	Favorable
The Penguin Guide to Jazz Recordings	3.5/4 stars

Basle, 1969 (also released as Live on Tour Switzerland) is a big band jazz album recorded by the Thad Jones/Mel Lewis Jazz Orchestra in Basle (Basel), Switzerland for a Swiss radio broadcast. It was not released until 1996 – as Volume 4 of TCB Music's "Swiss Radio Days" series.

== Track listing ==
1. "Second Race" – 10:53
2. "Don't Ever Leave Me" – 4:29
3. "The Waltz You Swang For Me" – 9:23
4. "A- That's Freedom" (Hank Jones) – 11:09
5. "Come Sunday" (Duke Ellington) – 4:55
6. "Don't Get Sassy" – 11:48
7. "Bible Story" (Roland Hanna) – 6:47
8. "Groove Merchant" (Jerome Richardson) – 8:22

All songs arranged by Thad Jones. All songs composed by Jones except as noted.

== Personnel ==
- Thad Jones – flugelhorn
- Mel Lewis – drums
- Roland Hanna – piano
- Richard Davis – bass
- Jerome Richardson – alto saxophone, soprano saxophone
- Jerry Dodgion – alto saxophone
- Joe Henderson – tenor saxophone
- Eddie Daniels – tenor saxophone
- Pepper Adams – baritone saxophone
- Snooky Young – trumpet
- Richard Williams – trumpet
- Danny Moore – trumpet
- Al Porcino – trumpet
- Jimmy Knepper – trombone
- Ashley Fannell – trombone
- Eddie Bert – trombone
- Cliff Heather – trombone
