= Potpourri (The Thad Jones/Mel Lewis Orchestra album) =

Studio album by Thad Jones/Mel Lewis Jazz Orchestra
- Released: 1974
- Recorded: June 1974
- Studio: Sigma Sound, Philadelphia, Pennsylvania
- Genre: Jazz
- Length: 44:08
- Label: Philadelphia International
- Producer: Bobby Martin

Thad Jones/Mel Lewis Jazz Orchestra chronology
Live in Tokyo (1974)	Potpourri (1974)	Thad Jones/Mel Lewis and Manuel De Sica (1974)

Professional ratings
Review scores
Source	Rating
Allmusic	3/5 stars

Potpourri is a 1974 big band jazz album recorded by the Thad Jones/Mel Lewis Jazz Orchestra and released on the Philadelphia International Records label. The album was nominated for a 1975 Grammy Award in the category, "Best Jazz Performance - Big Band" and Thad Jones' arrangement of "Living for the City"by Stevie Wonder was also nominated in the Best Instrumental Arrangement category that same year.

== Track listing ==
LP side A:

1. "Blues In A Minute" – 8:24
2. "All My Yesterdays" – 4:31
3. "Quiet Lady" – 7:31
4. "Don't You Worry 'Bout a Thing" (Stevie Wonder) – 3:58

LP side B:

1. "For the Love of Money" (Kenneth Gamble, Leon Huff, Anthony Jackson) – 4:12
2. "Yours and Mine" – 3:46
3. "Ambiance" (Marian McPartland; arranged by Jerry Dodgion) – 7:22
4. "Living for the City" (Stevie Wonder) – 4:24

All songs composed and arranged by Thad Jones except as indicated.

== Personnel ==
- Thad Jones – flugelhorn
- Mel Lewis – drums
- Roland Hanna – piano
- George Mraz – bass
- Jerry Dodgion – alto saxophone, flute
- Eddie Xiques – alto saxophone, flute, clarinet
- Billy Harper – tenor saxophone, clarinet
- Ron Bridgewater – tenor saxophone, clarinet
- Pepper Adams – baritone saxophone
- Jon Faddis – trumpet
- Jim Bossy – trumpet
- Steve Furtado – trumpet
- Cecil Bridgewater – trumpet
- Jimmy Knepper – trombone
- Quentin Jackson – trombone
- Billy Campbell – trombone
- Cliff Heather – trombone
- Buddy Lucas – harmonica, jaw harp
