= It Only Happens Every Time =

Studio album by Monica Zetterlund, Thad Jones/Mel Lewis Jazz Orchestra
- Released: 1978
- Recorded: 1977 August, Helsinki/Stockholm
- Genre: Jazz
- Label: EMI/Inner City

Thad Jones/Mel Lewis Jazz Orchestra chronology
| Live in Munich (1976) | It Only Happens Every Time (1977) | Body and Soul (1978) |

Monica Zetterlund chronology
| Hej, man! (1975) | It Only Happens Every Time (1977) | Ur Svenska Ords Arkiv (1982) |

Professional ratings
Review scores
| Source | Rating |
|---|---|
| Allmusic | 2.5/5 stars |

It Only Happens Every Time is a 1977 big band jazz album recorded by the Thad Jones/Mel Lewis Jazz Orchestra with singer Monica Zetterlund in Helsinki and Stockholm and released by EMI in Europe and by Inner City Records in the US.

== Track listing ==
LP side A:

1. "It Only Happens Every Time"
2. "Long Daddy Green"
3. "Silhouette"
4. "He Was Too Good To Me"

LP side B:

1. "The Groove Merchant"
2. "Love To One Is One To Love"
3. "Happy Again"
4. "The Second Time Around"

== Personnel ==
- Monica Zetterlund – vocals
- Thad Jones – flugelhorn
- Mel Lewis – drums
- Harold Danko – piano
- Rufus Reid – bass
- Jerry Dodgion – saxophone, flute
- Ed Xiques – saxophone, flute, clarinet
- Rich Perry – saxophone, flute, clarinet
- Dick Oatts – saxophone, flute, clarinet
- Pepper Adams – saxophone
- Frank Gordon – trumpet
- Earl Gardner – trumpet
- Jeff Davis – trumpet
- Larry Moses – trumpet
- Earl McIntyre – trombone
- John Mosca – trombone
- Clifford Adams – trombone
- Billy Campbell – trombone
