= Live in Munich (The Thad Jones/Mel Lewis Orchestra album) =

Live album by The Thad Jones/Mel Lewis Orchestra
- Released: 1976
- Recorded: September 1976
- Venue: Munich, Germany
- Genre: Jazz, big band
- Length: 44:18
- Label: Horizon

The Thad Jones/Mel Lewis Orchestra chronology
Thad Jones/Mel Lewis Orchestra with Rhoda Scott (1976)	Live in Munich (1976)	It Only Happens Every Time (1977)

Professional ratings
Review scores
Source	Rating
AllMusic	3/5 stars

Live in Munich is an album by The Thad Jones/Mel Lewis Orchestra that won the Grammy Award for Best Jazz Instrumental Performance, Big Band in 1979.

== Track listing ==
No.	Title	Writer(s)	Length
1.	"Mach II"	Rhoda Scott	8:21
2.	"A – That's Freedom"	Hank Jones	8:57
3.	"Mornin' Reverend"	Thad Jones	5:35
4.	"Come Sunday"	Duke Ellington	5:10
5.	"Central Park North"	Thad Jones	16:15

== Personnel ==
- Thad Jones – flugelhorn
- Mel Lewis – drums
- Earl Gardner – trumpet
- Frank Gordon – trumpet
- Lynn Nicholson – trumpet
- Al Porcino – trumpet
- Clifford Adams – trombone
- Billy Campbell – trombone
- Earl McIntyre – trombone
- John Mosca – trombone
- Pepper Adams – saxophone
- Jerry Dodgion – saxophone, flute
- Greg Herbert – saxophone, flute, clarinet
- Larry Schneider – saxophone, flute, clarinet
- Ed Xiques – saxophone, flute
- Harold Danko – piano
- Bob Bowman – double bass
