= The Thad Jones Mel Lewis Quartet =

Live album by The Thad Jones Mel Lewis Quartet
- Released: 1978
- Recorded: September 24, 1977
- Venue: Airliner Loung, Miami, Florida
- Genre: Jazz
- Length: 45:47
- Label: Artists House; AH 6
- Producer: John Snyder

Thad Jones and Mel Lewis chronology
Greetings and Salutations (1977)	The Thad Jones Mel Lewis Quartet (1978)	Thad Jones, Mel Lewis and UMO (1978)

The Thad Jones Mel Lewis Quartet is a live album by the Thad Jones Mel Lewis Quartet recorded in 1977 in Miami and released on the Artists House label in 1978.

== Reception ==
Professional ratings
Review scores
Source	Rating
Allmusic	5/5 stars
DownBeat	4.5/5 stars

Allmusic reviewer by Scott Yanow said "This is one of the finest small-group sessions of cornetist Thad Jones' career ... Jones plays at his peak ... Four of the songs are at least nine minutes long (two are over 15 minutes), yet Jones never loses his momentum. The musicians constantly surprise each other and there are many spontaneous moments during this often brilliant outing".

== Track listing ==
1. "But Not for Me" (George Gershwin) − 16:30
2. "This Can't Be Love" (Richard Rodgers, Lorenz Hart) − 3:52
3. "Autumn Leaves" (Joseph Kosma, Jacques Prévert, Johnny Mercer) − 15:25
4. "What Is This Thing" (Mel Lewis, Thad Jones) − 4:45
5. "Love for Sale" (Cole Porter) − 9:24 Additional track on CD reissue
6. "Things Ain't What They Used to Be" (Mercer Ellington, Ted Persons) − 12:18 Additional track on CD reissue

== Personnel ==
- Thad Jones − cornet, flugelhorn
- Harold Danko − piano
- Rufus Reid − bass
- Mel Lewis − drums
