= Suite for Pops =

Studio album by Thad Jones/Mel Lewis Jazz Orchestra
- Released: 1975
- Recorded: January 1972 – July 1975
- Genre: Jazz
- Label: A&M Horizon

Thad Jones/Mel Lewis Jazz Orchestra chronology
Thad Jones/Mel Lewis and Manuel De Sica (1974)	Suite for Pops (1975)	New Life (1976)

Professional ratings
Review scores
Source	Rating
Allmusic (link)	2/5 stars

Suite for Pops is a 1975 big band jazz album recorded by the Thad Jones/Mel Lewis Jazz Orchestra and released on the A&M Horizon label.

== Track listing ==
LP side A:

1. "Meetin' Place"
2. "The Summary"
3. "The Farewell"
4. "Toledo By Candlelight"

LP side B:

1. "The Great One"
2. "Only For Now"
3. "A Good Time Was Had By All"

== Personnel ==
- Thad Jones – trumpet, flugelhorn, percussion
- Mel Lewis – drums
- Roland Hanna – piano
- Richard Davis – double bass
- George Mraz - double bass
- Steve Gilmore - double bass
- Jerry Dodgion – lead soprano & alto saxophone, flute
- Eddie Xiques – alto saxophone, clarinet, bass clarinet, flute
- Billy Harper – tenor saxophone, flute
- Eddie Daniels – tenor saxophone, clarinet, flute
- Ron Bridgewater - tenor saxophone, clarinet, flute
- Frank Foster - tenor saxophone, clarinet
- Greg Herbert - tenor saxophone
- Lou Marini - tenor saxophone
- Pepper Adams – baritone saxophone, clarinet
- Jon Faddis – lead trumpet, percussion
- Stephen Furtado - trumpet
- Jim Bossy - trumpet
- Lew Soloff - trumpet
- Snooky Young – trumpet
- Marvin Stamm – trumpet
- Virgil Jones – trumpet
- Cecil Bridgewater – trumpet
- Jimmy Knepper – trombone
- Quentin Jackson – trombone
- Eddie Bert – trombone
- Janice Robinson - trombone
- Earl McIntyre - bass trombone
- Cliff Heather - bass trombone
- Jack Jeffers – bass trombone/tuba
- Dave Taylor - bass trombone
- Jimmy Buffington – French horn
- Peter Gordon - French horn
- Earl Chapin - French horn
- Julius Watkins - French horn
- Ray Alonge – French horn
- Leonard Gibbs - percussion
- Dee Dee Bridgewater – vocal

== References and external links ==
- A&M Horizon SP-701
- Suite for Pops at:
  - Allmusic
  - discogs.com
