= In Europe (Thad Jones Mel Lewis Orchestra album) =

Live album by Thad Jones / Mel Lewis Jazz Orchestra
- Released: 2007
- Recorded: 1978 October 2 (Berlin), Germany and 1978 October 26 (Warsaw), Poland
- Genre: Jazz
- Length: 144:33

The Thad Jones Mel Lewis Orchestra In Europe is a compilation of live recordings made by the Thad Jones / Mel Lewis Jazz Orchestra in Poland and Germany in October 1978.

== Release history ==
All tracks were previously released on one of two WestWind Jazz releases, A Touch of Class and Body and Soul.

== Track listing ==
Disc 1:

1. "Samba Con Get Chu" (Brookmeyer) – 13:05
2. "Quietude" – 7:36
3. "Cecilia Is Love" (Foster) – 6:28
4. "I Love You" (Porter) – 5:55
5. "And I Love You So" (McLean) – 7:31
6. "That's Freedom" (H. Jones) – 9:04
7. "The Second Race" – 10:31
8. "Willow Weep for Me" – 9:19

Disc 2:

1. "Sixty First and Richard" – 12:00
2. "Body and Soul" – 7:32
3. "Don't Get Sassy" – 11:07
4. "Child Is Born" – 10:17
5. "Fingers" – 15:38
6. "Intimacy of the Blues" (Strayhorn) – 18:31

All songs composed by Thad Jones except as noted.

== Personnel ==
- Thad Jones – flugelhorn
- Mel Lewis – drums
- Jim McNeely – piano
- Jasper Lundgaard – bass
- Dick Oatts – alto saxophone
- Steve Coleman – alto saxophone
- Rick Perry – tenor saxophone
- Robert Rockwell – tenor saxophone
- Charles Davis – baritone saxophone
- Ron Tooley – trumpet
- Simo Salminin – trumpet
- Irvin Stokes – trumpet
- Larry Moss – trumpet
- John Mosca – trombone
- Doug Purviance – trombone
- Lolly Bienenfeld – trombone
- Lu Robertson – trombone
