= Presenting Joe Williams and Thad Jones/Mel Lewis, the Jazz Orchestra =

1966 big band jazz album

Studio album by Joe Williams, Thad Jones/Mel Lewis Jazz Orchestra
- Recorded: 1966 September, New York City
- Genre: Jazz
- Length: 40:43
- Label: Solid State

Thad Jones/Mel Lewis Jazz Orchestra chronology
Presenting Thad Jones/Mel Lewis... (1966)	Presenting Joe Williams and Thad Jones/Mel Lewis... (1966)	Live at the Village Vanguard (1967)

Joe Williams chronology
The Exciting Joe Williams (1965)	Presenting Joe Williams and Thad Jones/Mel Lewis... (1966)	Worth Waiting For (1970)

Alternative cover
- Nippon Columbia (Japan) LP cover

Professional ratings
Review scores
Source	Rating
Allmusic (link)	5/5 stars

Presenting Joe Williams and Thad Jones/Mel Lewis, the Jazz Orchestra is a 1966 big band jazz album recorded by Joe Williams with the Thad Jones/Mel Lewis Jazz Orchestra and released on the Solid State Records label.

== Track listing ==
LP side A:

1. "Get Out of My Life Woman" (Toussaint) – 3:21
2. "Woman's Got Soul" (Mayfield) – 2:22
3. "Nobody Knows the Way I Feel This Morning" (Delaney, Delaney) – 4:30
4. "Gee Baby, Ain't I Good to You" (Razaf, Redman) – 2:52
5. "How Sweet It Is (To Be Loved by You)" (Dozier, Holland, Holland) – 2:32
6. "Keep Your Hand on Your Heart" (Broonzy) – 3:37

LP side B:

1. "Evil Man Blues" (Feather, Hampton) – 3:26
2. "Come Sunday" (Ellington) – 3:16
3. "Smack Dab in the Middle" (Calhoun) – 3:29
4. "It Don't Mean a Thing (If It Ain't Got That Swing)" (Ellington, Mills) – 3:04
5. "Hallelujah I Love Her So" (Charles) – 3:01
6. "Night Time Is the Right Time (to Be With the One You Love)" (Sykes) – 5:13

== Personnel ==
- Joe Williams – vocals
- Thad Jones – flugelhorn
- Mel Lewis – drums
- Richard Davis – bass guitar
- Roland Hanna – piano
- Sam Herman – guitar
- Jerome Richardson – saxophone
- Jerry Dodgion – saxophone
- Joe Farrell – saxophone
- Eddie Daniels – saxophone
- Pepper Adams – saxophone
- Richard Williams – trumpet
- Bill Berry – trumpet
- Jimmy Nottingham – trumpet
- Snooky Young – trumpet
- Bob Brookmeyer – trombone
- Garnett Brown – trombone
- Tom McIntosh – trombone
- Cliff Heather – trombone

== References and external links ==
- Solid State SS-18008
- Allmusic, Scott Yanow review (link)
