= Opening Night (album) =

Live album by Thad Jones/Mel Lewis Jazz Orchestra
- Released: 2000
- Recorded: 1966 February 7, The Village Vanguard, New York City
- Genre: Jazz
- Length: 71:55
- Label: Alan Grant Presents (AGP); Resonance Records
- Producer: Alan Grant

Thad Jones/Mel Lewis Jazz Orchestra chronology
Opening Night (2000)	Presenting Thad Jones/Mel Lewis and the Jazz Orchestra (1966)

Professional ratings
Review scores
Source	Rating
Allmusic	4.5/5 stars

Opening Night is a big band jazz recording of the Thad Jones/Mel Lewis Jazz Orchestra playing at the Village Vanguard club in New York City in February 1966. This was the first performance of the group at this club although the recording was not released until 2000. A 50-year tradition for Monday nights at the Village Vanguard began from this first evening for the Thad Jones/Mel Lewis Jazz Orchestra which later became the Mel Lewis Jazz Orchestra and eventually the Vanguard Jazz Orchestra. Resonance Records released what they term an "official release", approved by the Jones and Lewis estates, in 2016.

== Track listing ==
All tracks composed by Thad Jones, except as indicated.

1. Introduction (Mel Lewis & Alan Grant) – 1:50
2. "Big Dipper" – 5:10
3. "Polka Dots and Moonbeams" (Van Heusen, Burke) – 3:47
4. "Once Around" – 12:37
5. "All My Yesterdays" – 4:08
6. "Morning Reverend" – 4:50
7. "Low Down" – 4:25
8. "Lover Man" (Davis, Ramirez, Sherman) – 5:08
9. "Mean What You Say" – 5:35
10. "Don't Ever Leave Me" – 4:15
11. "Willow Weep for Me" (Ronell) – 6:25
12. "The Little Pixie" – 13:45

== Personnel ==
- Thad Jones – flugelhorn
- Mel Lewis – drums
- Hank Jones – piano
- Richard Davis – bass
- Sam Herman – guitar
- Jerome Richardson – alto saxophone, soprano saxophone, clarinet, bass clarinet, flute
- Jerry Dodgion – alto saxophone
- Joe Farrell – tenor saxophone, clarinet, flute
- Eddie Daniels – tenor saxophone, clarinet, bass clarinet
- Pepper Adams – baritone saxophone
- Snooky Young – trumpet
- Jimmy Owens – trumpet
- Bill Berry – trumpet
- Jimmy Nottingham – trumpet
- Bob Brookmeyer – trombone
- Jack Rains – trombone
- Garnett Brown – trombone
- Cliff Heather – trombone
