= Live in Tokyo (The Thad Jones/Mel Lewis Orchestra album) =

Live album by Thad Jones / Mel Lewis Jazz Orchestra
- Released: 1974
- Recorded: March 1974, Tokyo, Japan
- Genre: Jazz
- Length: 44:02
- Label: Denon Jazz

Thad Jones / Mel Lewis Jazz Orchestra chronology
Consummation (1970)	Live in Tokyo (1974)	Potpourri (1974)

Alternative cover
- original LP cover with obi strip

Live In Tokyo is a live recording of the Thad Jones/Mel Lewis Jazz Orchestra made in Tokyo, Japan, in 1974.

== Track listing ==
1. "Once Around" – 10:56
2. "Back Bone" – 9:43
3. "Mean What You Say" – 12:40
4. "Little Pixie" – 10:43

== Personnel ==
- Thad Jones – flugelhorn
- Mel Lewis – drums
- Roland Hanna – piano
- George Mraz – bass
- Jerry Dodgion – alto saxophone, flute
- Eddie Xiques – alto saxophone, clarinet
- Billy Harper – tenor saxophone
- Ron Bridgewater – tenor saxophone, clarinet
- Pepper Adams – baritone saxophone
- Jon Faddis –lead trumpet
- Jim Bossy – trumpet
- Steve Furtado – trumpet
- Cecil Bridgewater – trumpet
- Jimmy Knepper – lead trombone
- Quentin Butter Jackson – trombone
- Billy Campbell – trombone
- Cliff Heather – bass trombone

Guest : Buddy Lucas - harmonica
