= Presenting Thad Jones/Mel Lewis and the Jazz Orchestra =

Presenting Thad Jones/Mel Lewis & The Jazz Orchestra

Studio album by Thad Jones/Mel Lewis Jazz Orchestra
- Released: 1966
- Recorded: 1966 May 4–6, A&R Studios, New York City
- Genre: Jazz
- Length: 44:33
- Label: Solid State
- Producer: Sonny Lester

Thad Jones/Mel Lewis Jazz Orchestra chronology
All My Yesterdays	Presenting Thad Jones/Mel Lewis & The Jazz Orchestra (1966)	Presenting Joe Williams and Thad Jones/Mel Lewis,... (1966)

alternative cover

Professional ratings
Review scores
Source	Rating
Allmusic (link)	3/5 stars

Presenting Thad Jones/Mel Lewis & The Jazz Orchestra is a 1966 big band jazz album recorded by the Thad Jones/Mel Lewis Jazz Orchestra and released on the Solid State Records label. It is the debut release by the orchestra (although an earlier live session recording would eventually be released as Opening Night). All tracks are also included on Mosaic's limited edition boxed set, The Complete Solid State Recordings of the Thad Jones/Mel Lewis Orchestra.

The track titled "Three in One" is incorrectly labeled on the album cover. The correct title of the piece is "Three and One." The piece was originally written by Jones for a 1958 small group session titled "Keepin' Up With The Joneses" with Thad, his two siblings (Hank on piano and Elvin on drums), and bass player Eddie Jones (no relation). The title refers to the three Jones siblings plus one other Jones who is unrelated. The correct title is on the original parts as well as the later published version by Kendor.

== Track listing ==
LP side one

1. "Once Around" – 5:24
2. "Willow Weep for Me" (Ann Ronell, arr. Bob Brookmeyer) – 5:34
3. "Balanced Scales = Justice" (Tom McIntosh) – 4:58
4. "Three in One" – 5:45

LP side two

1. "Mean What You Say" – 5:26
2. "Don't Ever Leave Me" – 4:33
3. "A B C Blues" (Brookmeyer)– 12:53

All songs by Thad Jones except as noted.

== Personnel ==
- Thad Jones – flugelhorn
- Mel Lewis – drums
- Sam Herman - Guitar
- Hank Jones – piano
- Richard Davis – bass
- Jerome Richardson – saxophone
- Jerry Dodgion – saxophone
- Joe Farrell – saxophone
- Eddie Daniels – saxophone
- Pepper Adams – baritone saxophone
- Richard Williams – trumpet
- Danny Stiles – trumpet
- Bill Berry – trumpet
- Jimmy Nottingham – trumpet
- Bob Brookmeyer – trombone
- Jack Rains – trombone
- Tom McIntosh – trombone
- Cliff Heather – trombone

== References & external links ==
- Allmusic
- Solid State SS 18003
- United Artists (UK) SULP 1169
