= Thad Jones/Mel Lewis and Manuel De Sica =

Thad Jones/Mel Lewis and Manuel De Sica and the Jazz Orchestra

Studio album by Manuel De Sica, The Thad Jones/Mel Lewis Orchestra
- Released: 1976
- Recorded: 1973 September, London and 1974 July, Perugia
- Genre: Jazz
- Length: 34:06
- Label: PAUSA

Manuel De Sica, The Thad Jones/Mel Lewis Orchestra chronology
| Potpourri (1974) | Thad Jones/Mel Lewis and Manuel De Sica and the Jazz Orchestra (1976) | Suite for Pops (1975) |

Professional ratings
Review scores
| Source | Rating |
|---|---|
| Allmusic | 3/5 stars |

Thad Jones/Mel Lewis and Manuel De Sica and the Jazz Orchestra is a big band jazz recording by the Thad Jones/Mel Lewis Orchestra recorded in Europe in 1973 and 1974.

== Track listing ==
1. "First Jazz Suite" (De Sica)
  1. "Brasserie" – 3:19
  2. "Father" – 4:03
  3. "Sing" – 5:22
  4. "Ballade" – 3:09
  5. "For Life" – 5:54
2. "Little Pixie" (Jones) – 12:19

== Personnel ==
- Manuel De Sica - composer
- Thad Jones – flugelhorn
- Mel Lewis – drums
- Roland Hanna – piano
- George Mraz – bass
- Jerry Dodgion – alto saxophone, flute
- Eddie Xiques – alto saxophone, clarinet
- Billy Harper – tenor saxophone
- Ron Bridgewater – tenor saxophone, clarinet
- Pepper Adams – baritone saxophone
- Jon Faddis – trumpet
- Jim Bossy – trumpet
- Steve Furtado – trumpet
- Cecil Bridgewater – trumpet
- Jimmy Knepper – trombone
- Quentin Jackson – trombone
- Billy Campbell – trombone
- Cliff Heather – trombone
- Dee Dee Bridgewater – vocals
