= The Big Band Sound of Thad Jones/Mel Lewis featuring Miss Ruth Brown =

Studio album by Ruth Brown, Thad Jones/Mel Lewis Jazz Orchestra
- Released: 1968
- Recorded: June–July 1968
- Studio: Bell Sound (New York City)
- Genre: Jazz
- Label: Solid State

Thad Jones / Mel Lewis Jazz Orchestra chronology
Jazz Casual... (1968)	The Big Band Sound... Featuring Miss Ruth Brown (1968)	Monday Night (1968)

Ruth Brown chronology
Ruth Brown '65 (1965)	The Big Band Sound... Featuring Miss Ruth Brown (1968)	Black Is Brown and Brown Is Beautiful (1969)

Alternative cover / title

Professional ratings
Review scores
Source	Rating
Allmusic (link)	3/5 stars

The Big Band Sound of Thad Jones/Mel Lewis featuring Miss Ruth Brown, also released as Fine Brown Frame, is a 1968 Solid State Records recording of vocalist Ruth Brown with the Thad Jones/Mel Lewis Orchestra.

== Track listing ==
LP side A:

1. "Yes Sir, That's My Baby"
2. "Trouble in Mind"
3. "Sonny Boy"
4. "Bye Bye Blackbird"
5. "I'm Gonna Move to the Outskirts of Town" (Razaf/Weldon)

LP side B:

1. "Black Coffee"
2. "Be Anything (but Be Mine)"
3. "You Won't Let Me Go"
4. "Fine Brown Frame"

== Personnel ==
- Ruth Brown – vocals
- Thad Jones – flugelhorn
- Jerome Richardson – alto saxophone
- Jerry Dodgion – alto saxophone
- Eddie Daniels – tenor saxophone
- Seldon Powell – tenor saxophone
- Pepper Adams – baritone saxophone
- Snooky Young – trumpet
- Richard Williams – trumpet
- Jimmy Nottingham – trumpet
- Danny Moore – trumpet
- Bill Berry – trumpet
- Garnett Brown – trombone
- Jimmy Knepper – trombone
- Cliff Heather – trombone
- Jimmy Cleveland – trombone
- Roland Hanna – piano
- Richard Davis – bass
- Mel Lewis – drums
