= Gregory Herbert =

American jazz musician

Gregory Herbert (May 19, 1947 – January 31, 1978) was an American jazz saxophonist and flautist.

Herbert started on alto saxophone at age 12. In 1964 he did a short stint in the Duke Ellington Orchestra, then studied at Temple University from 1965 to 1971. While a student he recorded with Pat Martino in 1968. From 1971 to 1975 he toured with Woody Herman, then played with Harold Danko in 1975 and the Thad Jones/Mel Lewis Orchestra from 1975 to 1977. Afterwards, he played briefly with Chuck Israels and Blood, Sweat and Tears. Additionally, Herbert appeared on Chet Baker's Once Upon a Summertime in 1977 along with Harold Danko, Ron Carter and Mel Lewis.

Herbert died of a heroin overdose in Amsterdam in 1978. He never recorded a session as a leader.

== Discography ==
With Chet Baker

- Once Upon a Summertime (Artists House, 1977)

With Johnny Coles

- Katumbo (Dance) (Mainstream, 1971)

With Harold Danko

- Harold Danko Quartet (Inner City, 1974)

With Woody Herman

- Thundering Herd (Fantasy, 1974)

With Chuck Israels

- National Jazz Ensemble (Chiaroscuro, 1975)

With The Thad Jones/Mel Lewis Orchestra

- Live in Munich (Horizon, 1976)
- Suite for Pops (A&M Horizon, 1975)
- Thad Jones/Mel Lewis Orchestra with Rhoda Scott (Barclay, 1976)

With Mel Lewis

- Mel Lewis and Friends (A&M/Horizon, 1977)

With Pat Martino

- Baiyina (The Clear Evidence) (Prestige, 1968)
