= The Soul of the City =

Studio album by Manny Albam
- Released: 1966
- Recorded: April 26–28, 1966 in New York City
- Genre: Jazz
- Label: Solid State SS-18009
- Producer: Sonny Lester

Manny Albam chronology
Brass on Fire (1966)	The Soul of the City (1966)

The Soul of the City is an album by American jazz arranger and conductor Manny Albam featuring performances recorded in 1966 and originally issued on the Solid State label.

== Reception ==
The Allmusic review by Ken Dryden stated "these progressive big band charts have held up very well over the decades since The Soul of the City was first issued by Solid State in 1966. This beautifully recorded album is well worth picking up".

Professional ratings
Review scores
Source	Rating
Allmusic	4/5 stars

== Track listing ==
All compositions by Manny Albam

1. "Born on Arrival" - 4:30
2. "The Children's Corner" - 2:49
3. "Museum Pieces" - 4:41
4. "The Game of the Year" - 2:47
5. "A View from the Outside" - 5:52
6. "Tired Faces Going Places" - 3:59
7. "A View from the Inside" - 5:28
8. "Ground Floor Rear (Next to the Synagogue)" - 3:57
9. "Riverview" - 2:55
10. "El Barrio Latino" - 2:15

== Personnel ==
- Big Band arranged and conducted by Manny Albam including:
- Freddie Hubbard, Joe Newman, Ernie Royal - trumpet
- Burt Collins - trumpet, flugelhorn
- J. J. Johnson - trombone
- Jerome Richardson - flute
- Phil Woods - alto saxophone
- Frank Wess - tenor saxophone
- Hank Jones - piano
- Mike Mainieri - vibraphone
- Richard Davis - bass
