= A Bag Full of Blues =

Studio album by Jimmy McGriff
- Released: 1967
- Recorded: 1967 in New York City
- Genre: Jazz
- Label: Solid State SS-18017
- Producer: Sonny Lester

Jimmy McGriff chronology
| Cherry (1966) | A Bag Full of Blues (1967) | I've Got a New Woman (1967) |

A Bag Full of Blues is an album by American jazz organist Jimmy McGriff featuring performances recorded in 1967 and originally released on the Solid State label.

== Reception ==
AllMusic gave the album 3 stars.

Professional ratings
Review scores
| Source | Rating |
|---|---|
| AllMusic | 3/5 stars |

== Track listing ==
All compositions by Manny Albam

1. "Better Late Than Never" - 4:50
2. "Finishin'" - 3:23
3. "Slim Jim" - 5:35
4. "Time Waltzes On" - 6:00
5. "The Long Day's Night" - 4:23
6. "The Long Hot Walk" - 5:14
7. "The Deacon's Peekin'" - 4:20
8. "Friday Nite's Rite" - 5:20

== Personnel ==
- Jimmy McGriff - organ
- Joe Newman - trumpet
- Jerome Richardson - tenor saxophone, soprano saxophone
- Barry Galbraith, Wally Richardson - guitar
- Richard Davis - bass
- Mel Lewis - drums
- Manny Albam - arranger, conductor
