= Earl Gardner (musician) =

American jazz trumpeter (born 1950)

- Born: April 19, 1950 (age 76); New York City, New York, United States
- Genre: Jazz
- Occupation: Trumpeter

Earl Wesley Gardner, Jr. (born April 19, 1950 in New York City) is an American jazz trumpeter known for his stint in the house band on Saturday Night Live, a chair he held from 1985 until 2022.

In 1976, he joined The Thad Jones/Mel Lewis Orchestra. He has later joined Carla Bley's Big Band.

== Discography ==
With Carla Bley

- Looking for America (Watt, 2003)
- Appearing Nightly (Watt, 2008)

With George Benson

- Big Boss Band (Warner Bros., 1990)

With Andy Bey

- Tuesdays in Chinatown (N-Coded, 2001)

With Angela Bofill

- I Wanna Love Somebody (Jive, 1983)

With David Bowie

- Never Let Me Down (EMI, 1987)

With David Byrne

- Grown Backwards (Nonesuch, 2004)

With Betty Carter

- The Music Never Stops (Blue Engine, 2019)

With Casiopea

- Sun Sun (Alfa, 1986)
- Platinum (Polydor, 1987)

With Hank Crawford

- Tight (Milestone, 1996)

With Robin Eubanks

- Karma (JMT, 1991)

With Charlie Haden's Liberation Music Orchestra

- Dream Keeper (Blue Note, 1990)

With Tom Harrell

- Time's Mirror (RCA Victor, 1999)

With Joe Henderson

- Big Band (Verve, 1997)

With Dave Holland

- What Goes Around (ECM, 2002)

With James Ingram

- Never Felt So Good (Qwest, 1986)

With Branford Marsalis

- I Heard You Twice the First Time' (Sony, 1992)

With John Scofield

- Up All Night (Verve, 2003)
- That's What I Say: John Scofield Plays the Music of Ray Charles (Verve, 2005)

With Zoot Sims and the Benny Carter Orchestra

- Passion Flower: Zoot Sims Plays Duke Ellington (1979)

With Bob Stewart

- Goin' Home (JMT, 1989)

With The Thad Jones/Mel Lewis Orchestra

- Thad Jones/Mel Lewis Orchestra with Rhoda Scott (Barclay, 1976)
- It Only Happens Every Time (EMI, 1977)
- Live in Munich (Horizon/A&M, 1976)

With Stanley Turrentine

- Nightwings (Fantasy, 1977)

With McCoy Tyner

- The Turning Point (Birdology, 1992)
- Journey (Birdology, 1993)
