= Once Upon a Summertime (Chet Baker album) =

Studio album by Chet Baker
- Released: 1980
- Recorded: February 20, 1977
- Studio: Sound Ideas Studio, NYC
- Genre: Jazz
- Length: 40:35
- Label: Artists House; AH 11
- Producer: John Snyder

Chet Baker chronology
Deep in a Dream of You (1976)	Once Upon a Summertime (1980)	You Can't Go Home Again (1977)

Once Upon a Summertime is an album by trumpeter Chet Baker which was recorded in 1977 and released on the Artists House label in 1980.

== Reception ==
Professional ratings
Review scores
Source	Rating
AllMusic	4/5 stars
The Rolling Stone Jazz Record Guide	3/5 stars

The AllMusic review by Scott Yanow states "The challenging material ("The Song Is You" is the only one of the five songs that is a standard) inspires the musicians to play creative solos".

== Track listing ==
1. "Tidal Breeze" (Harold Danko) – 6:49
2. "Shifting Down" (Kenny Dorham) – 7:30
3. "E.S.P." (Wayne Shorter) – 5:39
4. "The Song Is You" (Jerome Kern, Oscar Hammerstein II) – 9:15
5. "Once Upon a Summertime" (Eddie Barclay, Michel Legrand) – 11:22

== Personnel ==
- Chet Baker – trumpet
- Gregory Herbert – tenor saxophone
- Harold Danko – piano
- Ron Carter – bass
- Mel Lewis – drums
