= Back Again (Bob Brookmeyer album) =

Studio album by Bob Brookmeyer
- Released: 1978
- Recorded: May 23–25, 1978
- Studio: Cl Studio, NYC
- Genre: Jazz
- Length: 42:41
- Label: Sonet
- Producer: Samuel Charters

Bob Brookmeyer chronology
| Gingerbread Men (1966) | Back Again (1978) | The Bob Brookmeyer Small Band (1978) |

Back Again is an album released by American jazz trombonist Bob Brookmeyer featuring tracks recorded in 1978 and originally released on the Sonet label.

== Reception ==
Professional ratings
Review scores
| Source | Rating |
|---|---|
| AllMusic | 4/5 stars |
| The Penguin Guide to Jazz Recordings | 4/4 stars |

Scott Yanow of AllMusic stated: "This session was valve trombonist Bob Brookmeyer's first jazz date in 13 years after a period writing for the studios and then away from music altogether. Brookmeyer, who is featured in a quintet with cornetist Thad Jones, pianist Jimmy Rowles, bassist George Mraz and drummer Mel Lewis, proves to still be in prime form playing in an unchanged style".

== Track listing ==
1. "Sweet and Lovely" (Gus Arnheim, Jules LeMare, Harry Tobias) - 8:30
2. "Carib" (Bob Brookmeyer) - 4:07
3. "Caravan" (Juan Tizol, Duke Ellington, Irving Mills) - 7:37
4. "You'd Be So Nice to Come Home To" (Cole Porter) - 6:49
5. "Willow Weep for Me" (Ann Ronell) - 3:45
6. "I Love You" (Porter) - 5:58
7. "In a Rotten Mood" (Brookmeyer) - 5:55

== Personnel ==
- Bob Brookmeyer - valve trombone
- Thad Jones - cornet, flugelhorn
- Jimmy Rowles - piano
- George Mraz - bass
- Mel Lewis - drums
