= Brass on Fire =

Studio album by Manny Albam
- Released: 1966
- Recorded: April 26–28, 1966 in New York City
- Genre: Jazz
- Label: Solid State SS-18000
- Producer: Sonny Lester

Manny Albam chronology
Jazz Goes to the Movies (1962)	Brass on Fire (1966)	The Soul of the City (1966)

Brass on Fire is an album by American jazz arranger and conductor Manny Albam featuring performances recorded in 1966 and originally issued on the Solid State label as their first proper release.

== Reception ==
Professional ratings
Review scores
Source	Rating
AllMusic	3/5 stars

The AllMusic review by Ken Dryden states, "Albam's arrangements of the dozen standards are still fresh decades later, whether alternating between the trumpet and trombone sections, or showcasing individual soloists".

== Track listing ==
1. "That Old Black Magic" (Harold Arlen, Johnny Mercer) - 2:25
2. "Happiness Is a Thing Called Joe" (Arlen, Yip Harburg) - 4:02
3. "Lullaby of Broadway" (Harry Warren, Al Dubin) - 3:16
4. "My Heart Stood Still" (Richard Rodgers, Lorenz Hart) - 2:18
5. "My Old Flame" (Sam Coslow, Arthur Johnston) 2:52
6. "Zing! Went the Strings of My Heart" (James F. Hanley) - 2:13
7. "Strike Up the Band" (George Gershwin, Ira Gershwin) - 2:04
8. "After You've Gone" (Turner Layton, Henry Creamer) - 2:45
9. "Carioca" (Vincent Youmans, Edward Eliscu, Gus Kahn) - 2:47
10. "I Get a Kick Out of You" (Cole Porter) - 2:20
11. "Ja-Da" (Bob Carleton) - 2:17
12. "Just One of Those Things" (Porter) - 2:28

== Personnel ==
- Manny Albam - arranger, conductor
- Danny Stiles, Ernie Royal, Jimmy Maxwell, Joe Newman, Johnny Frosk, Thad Jones - trumpet
- Bob Brookmeyer, Eddie Bert, Tony Studd, Wayne Andre - trombone
- Al Richmond, Earl Chapin, Howard Howard, James Buffington, Ray Alonge - French horn
- Barry Galbraith - guitar
- Richard Davis - bass
- Mel Lewis - drums
- Ted Sommer - bongos
