= The Blue Note Reissue Series: Thad Jones/Mel Lewis =

The Blue Note Reissue Series: Thad Jones / Mel Lewis

Compilation album by The Thad Jones / Mel Lewis Jazz Orchestra
- Released: 1975
- Recorded: 1966–1970, New York City, etc.
- Genre: jazz
- Label: Blue Note

The Blue Note Reissue Series: Thad Jones / Mel Lewis is a 2 LP compilation album of songs taken from Blue Note (Solid State) releases of the Thad Jones / Mel Lewis Jazz Orchestra.

== Track listing ==
Side A

1. "Jive Samba"
2. "Mean What You Say"
3. "A Child is Born"

Side B

1. "Tiptoe"
2. "Get Out of My Life"
3. "Come Sunday"
4. "Woman's Got Soul"
5. "Groove Merchant"

Side C

1. "Big Dipper"
2. "Little Pixie"
3. "Central Park North"

Side D

1. "Mornin' Reverend"
2. "You Won't Let Me Go"
3. "Fine Brown Frame"
4. "Be Anything (But Be Mine)"

== Personnel ==
See personnel listing of original recordings:
