= Kaj Backlund =

Finnish jazz musician (1945–2013)

- Born: 24 February 1945; Helsinki, Finland
- Died: December 25, 2013 (aged 68) Helsinki, Finland
- Genres: Jazz
- Occupations: Trumpeter; composer; arranger; bandleader; theorist; music teacher
- Instrument: Trumpet
- Formerly of: UMO Jazz Orchestra

Harry Kaj Olof Backlund (24 February 1945 – 25 December 2013) was a Finnish jazz trumpeter, composer, arranger, bandleader, theorist, and one of the founders of the Helsinki Pop & Jazz Conservatory and the Jazz Department of Sibelius Academy. He was also one of the founding members of UMO Jazz Orchestra. He was a contemporary music education pioneer in Finland and a long-running senior music theory teacher in Helsinki Metropolia University of Applied Sciences.

Backlund started playing trumpet at the age of seven in a youth brass band led by his father, at the Church of Paavali in Helsinki. At 14 years of age, he founded his first big band, which also included Paroni Paakkunainen, Teppo Hauta-aho, Eero Ojanen, Pekka Pöyry, and Juhani Aaltonen. Later, Backlund had to take a day job as an assistant accountant, but was able to participate in the Jyväskylä Arts Festival in 1966 and 1967, where George Russell was teaching. He started to get work opportunities as a session musician from Yle Radio Dance Orchestra and UMO Jazz Orchestra.

In the beginning of the 1970s, Backlund started to arrange Toivo Kärki's songs. Backlund helped found the Oulunkylä Pop & Jazz school (later Helsinki Pop & Jazz Conservatory) and planned the first curriculum of the Sibelius Academy Jazz Department.

Kaj Backlund's sons Jari, Jukka, and Tapio are all musicians.

== Selected discography ==
As composer and arranger

- Pori Big Band – Pori Big Band (1974)
- UMO – Our Latin Friends (1976)
- Studio Big Band – No Comments – Finnish Big Band Jazz (1977)
- Kulttis Workshop – Kulttis Workshop (1988)
- Various artists – Julkaisemattomat vol. 8 (2001)

As trumpeter

- UMO, Thad Jones, and Mel Lewis – Thad Jones, Mel Lewis and UMO (1977)
- Eero Koivistoinen – Wahoo! (1973)
- Edward Vesala – Nan Madol (1974)
- Heikki Sarmanto – Everything Is It (1972)

== Bibliography ==
- Improvisointi Pop/Jazz-musiikissa. Helsinki: Musiikki Fazer 1983. ISBN 951-757-108-9
