= Richard Williams (musician) =

- Born: Richard Gene Williams; May 4, 1931; Galveston, Texas, U.S.
- Died: November 4, 1985 (aged 54) Jamaica, Queens, New York, U.S.
- Genre: Jazz
- Occupation: Musician
- Instrument: Trumpet
- Label: Candid Records

Richard Gene Williams (May 4, 1931 – November 4, 1985) was an American jazz trumpeter.

== Biography ==
Williams was born in Galveston, Texas, and played tenor saxophone early in his life before picking up trumpet as a teenager. He played in local Texas bands and attended Wiley College, where he majored in music. After serving in the Air Force from 1952 to 1956, he toured Europe with Lionel Hampton, and upon his return took a master's degree at the Manhattan School of Music.

Williams played with Charles Mingus at the Newport Jazz Festival in 1959, and recorded with Mingus starting in that year. He recorded his only session as a leader, New Horn in Town (1960) for Candid Records, and featuring Reggie Workman, Leo Wright, Richard Wyands, and Bobby Thomas. Williams was a sideman on many releases for Blue Note, Impulse!, New Jazz, Riverside, and Atlantic in the 1960s. Among the musicians he worked with, apart from Mingus, are Oliver Nelson, Grant Green, Lou Donaldson, Yusef Lateef, Gigi Gryce, and Duke Jordan and the big bands of Duke Ellington, Gil Evans, Thad Jones and Mel Lewis, Sam Rivers and Clark Terry.

He also found work on Broadway in pit orchestras, in particular the premiere productions of The Me Nobody Knows and The Wiz. He appears on the original Broadway cast recordings of both musicals. Williams also led bands under his own leadership, playing in New York jazz clubs such as Sweet Basil, the Village Vanguard, and Gerald's. In addition to jazz trumpet, Williams also performed with classical orchestras, playing piccolo trumpet and flugelhorn.

Williams died on November 4, 1985, from kidney cancer in his Jamaica, New York home, at the age of 54.

== Discography ==
=== As leader ===
- New Horn in Town (Candid, 1961)

=== As sideman ===
With Ahmed Abdul-Malik

- Sounds of Africa (New Jazz, 1961)

With Mose Allison

- Hello There, Universe (Atlantic, 1970)

With Jaki Byard

- Out Front! (Prestige, 1964)

With Eddie "Lockjaw" Davis

- Trane Whistle (Prestige, 1960)

With Booker Ervin

- Cookin' (Savoy, 1960)
- The In Between (Blue Note, 1968)

With Bill Evans and George Russell

- Living Time (Columbia, 1972)

With Red Garland

- Soul Burnin' (Prestige, 1960)
- Rediscovered Masters (Prestige, 1977)

With Gigi Gryce

- Saying Somethin'! (New Jazz, 1960)
- The Hap'nin's (New Jazz, 1960)
- The Rat Race Blues (New Jazz, 1960)
- Reminiscin' (Mercury, 1960)
- Doin' the Gigi (Uptown, 2011)

With Slide Hampton

- Sister Salvation (Atlantic, 1960)
- Somethin' Sanctified (Atlantic, 1960)
- Drum Suite (Epic, 1962)
- Exodus (Philips, 1962 [1964])

With John Handy

- In the Vernacular (Roulette, 1958)

With Noah Howard

- Red Star (Mercury, 1977)

With Sam Jones

- Something New (Interplay, 1979)

With Duke Jordan

- Duke's Delight (SteepleChase, 1975)

With Rahsaan Roland Kirk

- The Roland Kirk Quartet Meets the Benny Golson Orchestra (Mercury, 1964)
- Left & Right (Atlantic, 1968)
- Other Folks' Music (Atlantic 1976)

With Yusef Lateef

- The Centaur and the Phoenix (Riverside, 1960)
- Jazz 'Round the World (Impulse!, 1963)
- Live at Pep's (Impulse! 1964)

With Les McCann

- Comment (Atlantic, 1970)

With Jack McDuff

- The Fourth Dimension (Cadet, 1974)

With Charles McPherson

- Today's Man (Mainstream, 1973)

With Carmen McRae

- Something to Swing About (Kapp, 1959)

With Charles Mingus

- Mingus Dynasty (Columbia 1959)
- Pre-Bird (Mingus Revisited) (Mercury 1961)
- The Complete Town Hall Concert (Blue Note, 1962 [1994])
- The Black Saint and the Sinner Lady (Impulse!, 1963)
- Mingus Mingus Mingus Mingus Mingus (Impulse!, 1963)

With Mingus Dynasty

- Reincarnation (Soul Note, SN1042, 1982)

With Oliver Nelson

- Screamin' the Blues (New Jazz, NJ 8243, 1960)

With John Patton

- The Way I Feel (Blue Note 1964)

With Hilton Ruiz

- Excition (SteepleChase, 1977)
- Steppin' Into Beauty (SteepleChase, 1977 [1982])

With Jimmy Smith

- Hoochie Coochie Man (Verve, 1966)

With The Thad Jones/Mel Lewis Orchestra

- Presenting Thad Jones/Mel Lewis and the Jazz Orchestra (Solid State, 1966)
- Presenting Joe Williams and Thad Jones/Mel Lewis, The Jazz Orchestra (Solid State, 1966)
- Live at the Village Vanguard (Solid State, 1967)
- The Big Band Sound of Thad Jones / Mel Lewis Featuring Miss Ruth Brown (Solid State, 1968)
- Monday Night (Solid State, 1968)
- Central Park North (Solid State, 1969)

With Charles Tolliver

- Music Inc. (Strata-East, 1971)
- Impact (Strata-East, 1975)

With Randy Weston

- Uhuru Afrika (Roulette, 1960)

With Leo Wright

- Blues Shout (Atlantic, 1960)

With Max Roach

- It's Time (Impulse!, 1962)
