= New Horn in Town =

Studio album by Richard Williams
- Released: January 1961
- Recorded: September 27, 1960; Nola Penthouse Studio, New York City
- Genre: Jazz
- Length: 40:27
- Label: Candid; CJS 9003
- Producer: Nat Hentoff

New Horn in Town is the sole album led by the jazz trumpeter Richard Williams. It was released through Candid Records in January 1961. It consists of performances recorded in late 1960.

== Reception ==
Professional ratings
Review scores
Source	Rating
AllMusic	4.5/5 stars
The Penguin Guide to Jazz Recordings	3.5/4 stars

Scott Yanow of AllMusic wrote: "Considering how well trumpeter Richard Williams plays on this session, it is hard to believe that this was the only record he ever led. ...a set of strong hard bop".

The Washington Post's Mark Kernis noted the album's "mixed styles, all highlighted by the clean sound of Williams' horn and solid rhythm support from veteran bassist Reginald Workman and drummer Bobby Thomas," and stated that Williams "plays like Harry James on ballads like 'Over the Rainbow' and 'I Remember Clifford'... and bops on more pointed tunes like 'Raucous Notes.'"

Author Dave Oliphant commented: "Given Williams's range of expressiveness, his secure technique, and his 'ease in all areas of modern jazz argot,' it is incomprehensible that this was the trumpeter's first and final album as a leader, for not only is he a consummate soloist on this recording, but here and elsewhere he 'leads ensembles with brilliant abandon' yet always with precision and 'exultant fervor.'"

Marc Myers of All About Jazz acknowledged Williams' "hard bop chops" and "low-flame blow-torch technique," and praised drummer Bobby Thomas, who is "tasteful at every turn."

Writing for Flophouse Magazine, François van de Linde remarked: "the frontline ensemble sound of Williams and Wright is like good cappuccino, vanilla and citrus flavors topped off with full cream milk, the sound of Williams is brassy and marked by joie de vivre, Wright's tone is darker and edgy, Williams has a forthright and stately delivery, Wright seems more introverted and self-absorbed, perhaps a difference between swing and bop but anyhow blending smoothly."

== Track listing ==
All compositions by Richard Williams except as indicated

1. "I Can Dream, Can't I?" (Sammy Fain, Irving Kahal) - 6:09
2. "I Remember Clifford" (Benny Golson) - 6:18
3. "Ferris Wheel" (Richard Wyands) - 4:48
4. "Raucous Notes" - 4:43
5. "Blues in a Quandary" - 4:31
6. "Over the Rainbow" (Harold Arlen, E.Y. "Yip" Harburg) - 8:37
7. "Renita's Bounce" - 5:21

== Personnel ==
- Richard Williams - trumpet
- Leo Wright - alto saxophone, flute
- Richard Wyands - piano
- Reggie Workman - bass
- Bobby Thomas - drums
