= A Touch of Class (album) =

Live album by Thad Jones/Mel Lewis Jazz Orchestra
- Released: 1978
- Recorded: 1978 October 26, Warsaw, Poland
- Genre: Jazz
- Label: West Wind Records

Thad Jones/Mel Lewis Jazz Orchestra chronology
| Body and Soul (Live in Berlin) (1978) | A Touch of Class (1978) |

Initial (Poland domestic) release
- Poljazz LP ZSX 697

A Touch of Class is a big band jazz album recorded by the Thad Jones/Mel Lewis Jazz Orchestra in Warsaw, Poland in November 1978. The first three tracks, together with a 14-minute version of "Fingers", were previously released in Poland on a Poljazz LP and all tracks were also included on the 2007 compilation album, Thad Jones Mel Lewis Orchestra In Europe and on the 2009 compilation CD, The Complete Poland Concerts 1976 & 1978.

== Track listing ==
1. "Quietude" (Thad Jones) – 7:26
2. "Samba Con Get Chu" (Bob Brookmeyer) – 13:35
3. "Cecilia Is Love" (Frank Foster) – 7:06
4. "I Love You" (Cole Porter) – 5:57
5. "And I Love You So" (Don McLean) – 7:33
6. "That's Freedom" (Jones) – 9:14

== Personnel ==
- Thad Jones – flugelhorn
- Mel Lewis – drums
- Jim McNeely – piano
- Jesper Lundgaard – bass
- Dick Oatts – alto saxophone
- Steve Coleman – alto saxophone
- Rich Perry – tenor saxophone
- Robert Rockwell – tenor saxophone
- Charles Davis – baritone saxophone
- Ron Tooley – trumpet
- Simo Salminen – trumpet
- Irvin Stokes – trumpet
- Larry Moss – trumpet
- Doug Purviance – trombone
- Lolly Bienenfeld – trombone
- Lu Robertson – trombone
- John Mosca – trombone
