= The Thad Jones/Mel Lewis Orchestra =

American jazz big band

Thad Jones/Mel Lewis, Vanguard Jazz Orchestra
- Origin: New York City
- Genres: Jazz
- Years active: 1965–1978 (original line); 1978–1990 (Mel Lewis Jazz Orchestra) since 1990 (Vanguard Jazz Orchestra)
- Labels: Solid State/RCA, A&M, Pausa, Telarc, Atlantic, New World, Planet Arts, Resonance
- Website: www.vanguardjazzorchestra.com

The Thad Jones/Mel Lewis Jazz Orchestra was a jazz big band formed by trumpeter Thad Jones and drummer Mel Lewis in New York in 1965. The band performed for twelve years in its original incarnation, including a 1972 tour of the Soviet Union during the height of the Cold War. The collaboration ended in 1978 with Jones suddenly moving to Copenhagen, Denmark, after which the band became the Mel Lewis Jazz Orchestra. Since the death of Lewis in 1990 it has been known as the Vanguard Jazz Orchestra. They have maintained a Monday-night residency at the Village Vanguard jazz club in New York for five decades. The band won Grammy Awards for the album Live in Munich in 1978 and for the album Monday Night Live at the Village Vanguard in 2009.

== History ==
Thad Jones professionally played two instruments, the trumpet and cornet. His older brother was Hank Jones, a jazz pianist, and his younger brother was Elvin Jones, a jazz drummer. Thad Jones had worked as a professional since he was 16, when he played with Hank. After leaving the military in 1946, he performed with territory bands and later with Charles Mingus. From 1954–1963, he was a member of the Count Basie Orchestra, for whom he composed and arranged.

Mel Lewis, a jazz drummer, had been playing in big bands since he was 15, first with Boyd Raeburn, then Alvino Rey, Stan Kenton, Terry Gibbs, and Gerald Wilson. In 1961, he toured the Soviet Union with veteran big band leader Benny Goodman. After Lewis moved to New York City, he met Thad Jones and started the Thad Jones/Mel Lewis Orchestra at the end of 1965. Beginning in February 1966, the band played every Monday night at the Village Vanguard. Since Lewis's death in 1990, the band has been called the Vanguard Jazz Orchestra, continuing its tradition as the Village Vanguard's house band.

The Thad Jones-Mel Lewis Orchestra was arguably the most influential big band since the swing era. Lewis brought a loose, small group style of drumming into the structure of a big band. His cymbal work became a hallmark of the Jones/Lewis Orchestra. Jones's arrangements influenced later, large-ensemble composers, such as Maria Schneider, Bob Brookmeyer, Jim McNeely, and Bob Mintzer. The Jones/Lewis Orchestra was an unusual band, creating new styles, succeeding in an era when big bands were unpopular and remaining integrated during racially tense periods.

The band's members included Bill Berry, Billy Harper, Bob Brookmeyer, Danny Stiles, Eddie Daniels, George Mraz, Hank Jones, Jerome Richardson, Jerry Dodgion, Jimmy Knepper, Joe Farrell, Jon Faddis, Marvin Stamm, Pepper Adams, Quentin Jackson, Richard Davis, Richard Williams, Roland Hanna, and Snooky Young.

== Awards and honors ==
=== Grammy Awards ===
- Thad Jones/Mel Lewis Jazz Orchestra and Mel Lewis Jazz Orchestra

Year	Nominee / work	Award	Result
1967	Live At The Village Vanguard (album)	Best instrumental Jazz Performance, Big Band	Nominated
1969	Central Park North (album)	Best instrumental Jazz Performance, Big Band	Nominated
1970	Consummation (album)	Best instrumental Jazz Performance, Big Band	Nominated
1975	Potpourri (album)	Best instrumental Jazz Performance, Big Band	Nominated
1976	New Life (album)	Best instrumental Jazz Performance, Big Band	Nominated
1978	Live In Munich (album)	Best instrumental Jazz Performance, Big Band	Won
1979	Naturally (album)	Best instrumental Jazz Performance, Big Band	Nominated
1980	Bob Brookmeyer - Composer/Arranger (album)	Best instrumental Jazz Performance, Big Band	Nominated
1982	Make Me Smile & Other New Works by Bob Brookmeyer (album)	Best instrumental Jazz Performance, Big Band	Nominated
1986	20 Years At The Village Vanguard (album)	Best instrumental Jazz Performance, Big Band	Nominated
1989	The Definitive Thad Jones (album)	Best instrumental Jazz Performance, Big Band	Nominated
1990	The Definitive Thad Jones (Volume 2: Live from the Village Vanguard) (album)	Best instrumental Jazz Performance, Big Band	Nominated

- The Vanguard Jazz Orchestra

Year	Nominee / work	Award	Result
2002	Can I Persuade You? (album)	Best instrumental Jazz Performance, Big Band	Nominated
2004	The Way: Music Of Slide Hampton (album)	Best instrumental Jazz Performance, Big Band	Nominated
2006	Up From The Skies: Music Of Jim McNeely (album)	Best instrumental Jazz Performance, Big Band	Nominated
2008	Monday Night Live At The Village Vanguard (album)	Best instrumental Jazz Performance, Big Band	Won
2014	OverTime: Music Of Bob Brookmeyer (album)	Best instrumental Jazz Performance, Big Band	Nominated

=== From DownBeat ===
Year	Music publication	won
1972	Down Beat	Readers' Poll-Big Band of the year
1973	Down Beat	Readers' Poll-Big Band of the year
1974	Down Beat	Critics' Poll-Big Band of the year
1974	Down Beat	Readers' Poll-Big Band of the year
1975	Down Beat	Critics' Poll-Big Band of the year
1975	Down Beat	Readers' Poll-Big Band of the year
1976	Down Beat	Critics' Poll-Big Band of the year
1976	Down Beat	Readers' Poll-Big Band of the year
1977	Down Beat	Critics' Poll-Big Band of the year
1977	Down Beat	Readers' Poll-Big Band of the year
1978	Down Beat	Critics' Poll-Big Band of the year

== Discography ==
=== The Thad Jones/Mel Lewis Orchestra ===
- All My Yesterdays (recorded 1966, released Resonance, 2016) - Live recording including the band's first performance (Monday, Feb. 7, 1966 at the Village Vanguard)
- Presenting Thad Jones/Mel Lewis and the Jazz Orchestra (Solid State, 1966)
- Presenting Joe Williams and Thad Jones/Mel Lewis, the Jazz Orchestra (Solid State, 1966) - with Joe Williams
- Live at the Village Vanguard (Solid State, 1967)
- The Big Band Sound of Thad Jones/Mel Lewis featuring Miss Ruth Brown (Solid State, 1968) - with Ruth Brown
- Monday Night (Solid State, 1968)
- Central Park North (Solid State/Blue Note, 1969)
- Consummation (Solid State/Blue Note, 1970)
- Live in Tokyo (Denon, 1974)
- Potpourri (Philadelphia International, 1974)
- Suite for Pops (Horizon/A&M, 1975)
- New Life: Dedicated to Max Gordon (Horizon/A&M, 1975)
- Thad Jones/Mel Lewis and Manuel De Sica (Pausa, 1976) – rec. 1974
- Thad Jones/Mel Lewis Orchestra With Rhoda Scott (aka Rhoda Scott in New York with the Thad Jones/Mel Lewis Orchestra) (Barclay, 1976)
- Live in Munich (Horizon/A&M, 1976)
- It Only Happens Every Time (EMI, 1977; Inner City, 1978) - with Monica Zetterlund
- Body and Soul (aka Thad Jones/Mel Lewis Orchestra in Europe) (West Wind, 1978)
- A Touch of Class (West Wind, 1978)
- Basle, 1969 (TCB, 1996) – rec. 1969
- Jazz Casual – Thad Jones/Mel Lewis Orchestra... (2001)[DVD-Video] – rec. 1968

Compilations

- The Blue Note Reissue Series: Thad Jones/Mel Lewis (Blue Note, 1975)[2LP] – rec. 1966–1970
- The Complete Solid State Recordings of the Thad Jones/Mel Lewis Orchestra (Mosaic, 1994)[5CD] – rec. 1966–1970
- In Europe (ITM, 2007)
- The Complete (Live in) Poland Concerts 1976 & 1978 (Gambit, 2009)

=== The Mel Lewis Jazz Orchestra ===
- Naturally (Telarc, 1979)
- Play the Compositions of Herbie Hancock (Live in Montreux) (MPS 1980; Pausa, 1982)
- Bob Brookmeyer - Composer/Arranger (Recorded in Concert at the Village Vanguard, February 1980 (Gryphon, 1980)
- Make Me Smile & Other New Works by Bob Brookmeyer (aka Mel Lewis and the Jazz Orchestra...Featuring the Music of Bob Brookmeyer) [live] (Finesse/CBS, 1982; Red Baron/CBS, 1993)
- 20 Years at the Village Vanguard (Atlantic, 1986)
- Soft Lights and Hot Music (Musicmasters, 1988)
- The Definitive Thad Jones (Musicmasters, 1989)
- The Definitive Thad Jones (Volume 2: Live from the Village Vanguard) (Musicmasters, 1990)
- To You: A Tribute to Mel Lewis (Musicmasters, 1991)

=== The Vanguard Jazz Orchestra ===
- Lickety Split: Music of Jim McNeely (New World, 1997)
- Thad Jones Legacy (New World, 1999)
- Can I Persuade You? (Planet Arts, 2002)
- The Way: Music of Slide Hampton (Planet Arts, 2004)
- Up from the Skies: Music of Jim McNeely (Planet Arts, 2006)
- Monday Night Live at the Village Vanguard (Planet Arts, 2008)[2CD]
- Forever Lasting: Live in Tokyo (Planet Arts, 2011)[2CD]
- OverTime: Music of Bob Brookmeyer (Planet Arts, 2014)
- Centennial: The Music of Thad Jones (Live) (BCM&D, 2024)[2CD]

== Alumni ==
Lead trumpet

- Snooky Young (1966–1972)
- Jon Faddis (1972–1975)
- Al Porcino (1975–1976)
- Earl Gardner (1976–2005)
- Nick Marchione (2005–2020)
- John Chudoba (2021–2024)
- Brian Pareschi (2024–present)

Trumpets

- Thad Jones (1966–1979)
- Danny Stiles (1966)
- Jimmy Owens (1966)
- Bill Berry (1966–1968)
- Jimmy Nottingham (1966–1969)
- Richard Williams (1966–1969)
- Marvin Stamm (1966–1973)
- Randy Brecker (1968)
- Danny Moore (1968–1971)
- Al Porcino (1969–1970 and 1975–1976)
- Cecil Bridgewater (1971–1976)
- Stephen Furtado (1972–1975)
- Jim Bossy (1972–1975)
- Lew Soloff (1975)
- Sinclair Acey (1975–1976)
- Waymon Reed (1975–1977)
- Earl Gardner (1975–2005)
- Lynn Nicholson (1976–1977)
- Frank Gordon (1976–1977)
- Jeff Davis (1976–1977)
- Larry Moses (1977–1980)
- Laurie Frink (1978–1987)
- Irvin Stokes (1978)
- Simo Salminen (1978–1980)
- Ron Tooley (1978–1980)
- John Marshall (1979–1983)
- Joe Mosello (1980–2005)
- Tom Harrell (1982)
- Jim Powell (1982–1995)
- Glenn Drewes (1983–2005)
- Ryan Kisor (1995–1997)
- Scott Wendholt (1997–present)
- Frank Greene (2005–2009)
- Terell Stafford (2005–present)
- Tanya Darby (2009–2016)
- John Chudoba (2016–2024)
- Brian Pareschi (2024–present)
- Jon Shaw (2025–present)

Lead trombone

- Bob Brookmeyer (1966–1968)
- Garnett Brown (1968–1969)
- Eddie Bert (1969–1972)
- Jimmy Knepper (1972–1975)
- Billy Campbell (1975–1977)
- John Mosca (1977–2018)
- Marshall Gilkes (2019–2023)
- Dion Tucker (2023–present)

Trombones

- Jack Rains (1966)
- Tom McIntosh (1966–1967)
- Garnett Brown (1966–1969)
- Jimmy Cleveland (1968)
- Jimmy Knepper (1968–1975)
- Benny Powell (1969–1971)
- Quentin Jackson (1972–1975)
- Billy Campbell (1972–1977)
- Alex Kofman (1975)
- Janice Robinson (1975–1976)
- John Mosca (1975–2018)
- Clifford Adams (1976–1977)
- Lolly Bienenfeld (1978–1980)
- Lee Robertson (1978–1981)
- Ed Neumeister (1981–1999)
- Jason Jackson (1998–present)
- Luis Bonilla (1999–2019)
- Dion Tucker (2019–present)
- Rob Edwards (2023–present)

Bass trombone

- Cliff Heather (1966–1974)
- Dave Taylor (1974–1975)
- Earl McIntyre (1975–1998)
- Douglas Purviance (1978–2025)
- Max Seigel (2025–present)

French horn

- Stephanie Fauber (1979–1991)

Saxophones

Lead alto saxophone

- Jerome Richardson (1966–1970)
- Jerry Dodgion (1971–1978)
- Dick Oatts (1978–2025)
- Ted Nash (2025–present)

Second alto saxophone

- Jerry Dodgion (1966–1970)
- Ed Xiques (1971–1977)
- Dick Oatts (1977–1978)
- Steve Coleman (1978–1980)
- Kenny Garrett (1980–1982)
- Bill Easley (1982)
- Ted Nash (1982–1991)
- Billy Drewes (1991–present)

First tenor saxophone

- Joe Farrell (1966–1969)
- Seldon Powell (1968)
- Joe Henderson (1969)
- Billy Harper (1970–1975)
- Frank Foster (1975)
- Larry Schneider (1975–1978)
- Dick Oatts (1977 summer tour)
- Bob Rockwell (1978–1980)
- Joe Lovano (1980–1991)
- Bob Mintzer (1981 Rome tour)
- Rich Perry (1991–present)

Second tenor saxophone

- Eddie Daniels (1966–1972)
- Ron Bridgewater (1972–1975)
- Gregory Herbert (1975–1977)
- Rich Perry (1977–1980)
- Gary Pribeck (1980–1982)
- Ralph Lalama (1983–present)

Baritone saxophone

- Pepper Adams (1966–1977)
- Eddie Xiques (1977–1978)
- Charles Davis (1978)
- Gary Brown (1979)
- Gary Pribeck (1979–1980)
- Gary Smulyan (1980–present)
- Frank Basile (regular sub)

Guitar

- Sam Herman (1966–1968)

Piano

- Hank Jones (1966)
- Roland Hanna (1966–1975)
- Walter Norris (1975–1976)
- Harold Danko (1976–1978)
- Jim McNeely (1978–1984)
- Kenny Werner (1984–1995)
- Jim McNeely (1995–2019)
- Adam Birnbaum (2019–present)
- Michael Weiss (regular sub 1991-2016)

Bass

- Richard Davis (1966–1972)
- Gene Perla (1972)
- George Mraz (1972–1976)
- Steve Gilmore (1975–1976)
- Rufus Reid (1977–1980)
- Ray Drummond (1978)
- Bob Bowman (1976 and 1979)
- John Lockwood (1980)
- Marc Johnson (1981–1982)
- Dennis Irwin (1983–2008)
- Phil Palombi (2008–2009)
- David Wong (2009–present)

Drums

- Mel Lewis (1966–1990)
- Dennis Mackrel (1990–1991)
- Danny Gottlieb (1991–1992)
- John Riley (1992–present)

Vocals

- Dee Dee Bridgewater (1971–1974)
- Ruth Brown (guest)
- Joe Williams (guest)
