= Thad Jones, Mel Lewis and UMO =

1977 studio album by UMO featuring Thad Jones and Mel Lewis

Studio album by UMO, Thad Jones, Mel Lewis
- Recorded: 1977 December, Helsinki
- Genre: Jazz
- Length: 54:09
- Label: RCA

Professional ratings
Review scores
Source	Rating
Allmusic	3/5 stars

Thad Jones, Mel Lewis and UMO is a big band jazz recording by UMO (Finnish acronym for "New Music Orchestra") with guest bandleaders / performers Thad Jones and Mel Lewis. It was recorded in Helsinki in 1977 and was nominated for a 1979 Grammy Award in the "Best Jazz Instrumental Performance - Big Band" category.

== Track listing ==
1. "Groove Merchant" – 5:05
2. "It Only Happens Every Time" – 5:48
3. "Tip-Toe" – 6:37
4. "The Great One" – 9:38
5. "Kids Are Pretty People" – 6:02
6. "Summary" – 5:54
7. "Little Pixie" – 7:55
8. "Only For Now" – 7:10

== Personnel ==
- Thad Jones – flugelhorn
- Mel Lewis – drums
- Simo Salminen – trumpet
- Markku Johansson – trumpet
- Esko Heikkinen – trumpet
- Kaj Backlund – trumpet
- Juhani Aalto – trombone
- Mircea Stan – trombone
- Petri Juutilainen – trombone
- Tom Bildo – trombone
- Pekka Poyry – saxophone, flute
- Juhani Aaltonen – saxophone, flute, clarinet
- Eero Koivistoinen – saxophone
- Teemu Salminen – saxophone, flute, clarinet
- Pentti Lahti – saxophone, clarinet
- Esko Linnavalli – piano
- Otto Berger – guitar
- Pekka Sarmanto – bass
- Esko Rosnell – percussion
