= Body and Soul (The Thad Jones/Mel Lewis Orchestra album) =

1990 live album by Thad Jones/Mel Lewis Orchestra

Body and Soul, Live in Berlin

Live album by The Thad Jones/ Mel Lewis Orchestra
- Released: 1990
- Recorded: 2 October 1978, Berlin, Germany
- Venue: Filmtheater Kosmos, Berlin
- Genre: Jazz, big band
- Length: 1:47:40
- Label: West Wind Jazz

The Thad Jones/ Mel Lewis Orchestra chronology
It Only Happens Every Time (1977)	Body and Soul, Live in Berlin (1990)	A Touch of Class (1978)

Body and Soul, Live in Berlin is a big band jazz album recorded by the Thad Jones/Mel Lewis Orchestra, recorded in Berlin in October 1978 and released on the West Wind Jazz label. West Wind also issued the two discs individually as The Orchestra (WW 2044) and Body and Soul (WW 2048). All tracks except "ABC Blues" are also included in the 2007 compilation album, Thad Jones Mel Lewis Orchestra In Europe.

== Track listing ==
Disc 1:

1. "Second Race" – 9:30
2. "Willow Weep for Me" (Ronell) – 8:45
3. "ABC Blues" (Brookmeyer)– 20:05
4. "Sixty First and Richard" – 11:25

Disc 2:

1. "Body and Soul" (Heyman, Sour, Eyton and Green) – 7:10
2. "Don't Get Sassy" – 10:25
3. "Child Is Born" – 9:45
4. "Fingers" – 14:10
5. "Intimacy of the Blues" (Strayhorn) – 16:25

All songs composed by Thad Jones except as noted.

== Personnel ==
- Thad Jones – flugelhorn
- Mel Lewis – drums
- Jim McNeely – piano
- Jesper Lundgaard – bass
- Dick Oatts – alto saxophone
- Steve Coleman – alto saxophone
- Rick Perry – tenor saxophone
- Robert Rockwell – tenor saxophone
- Charles Davis – baritone saxophone
- Ron Tooley – trumpet
- Simo Salminen – trumpet
- Irvin Stokes – trumpet
- Larry Moss – trumpet
- Doug Purviance – trombone
- Lolly Bienenfeld – trombone
- Lee Robertson – trombone
- John Mosca – trombone

== References / External links ==
- West Wind Jazz WW2048
- West Wind Jazz WW2407
- West Wind Jazz discography
- AllMusic
