= Mel Lewis =

American jazz drummer (1929–1990)

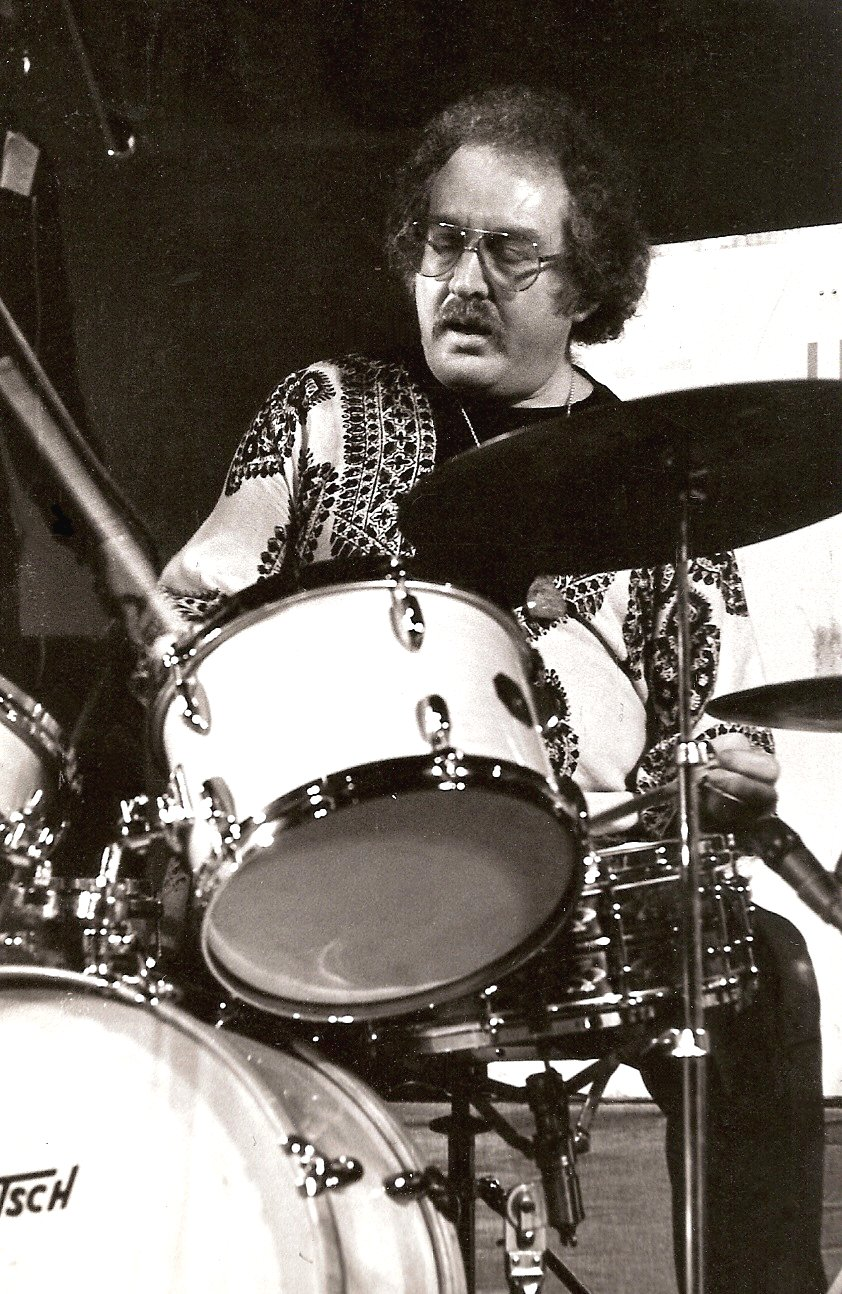
- Lewis in 1978

Background information
- Born: Melvin Sokoloff; May 10, 1929; Buffalo, New York, U.S.
- Died: February 2, 1990 (aged 60) New York City, U.S.
- Genres: Jazz
- Occupation: Musician
- Instrument: Drums
- Years active: 1954–1990
- Labels: Atlantic, Blue Note, VSOP, Solid State, Nimbus, Telarc, A&M, Philadelphia International

Melvin Sokoloff (May 10, 1929 – February 2, 1990), known professionally as Mel Lewis, was an American jazz drummer, session musician, professor, and author. He received fourteen Grammy Award nominations.

== Biography ==
=== Early years ===
Lewis was born in Buffalo, New York, to Russian-Jewish immigrant parents Samuel and Mildred Sokoloff. He started playing professionally as a teen, eventually joining Stan Kenton in 1954. His musical career brought him to Los Angeles in 1957 and New York City in 1963.

=== Career ===
In 1966 in New York, he teamed up with Thad Jones to lead the Thad Jones/Mel Lewis Orchestra. The group started as informal jam sessions with the top studio and jazz musicians of the city, but eventually began performing regularly on Monday nights at the famed venue, the Village Vanguard. In 1979, the band won a Grammy for their album Live in Munich. Like all of the musicians in the band, it was only a sideline. In 1976, he released an album titled Mel Lewis and Friends that featured him leading a smaller sextet that allowed freedom and improvisation.

When Jones moved to Denmark in 1978, the band became known as Mel Lewis and the Jazz Orchestra. Lewis continued to lead the band, recording and performing every Monday night at the Village Vanguard until shortly before his death from cancer at age 60. The band still performs on most Monday nights at the club. Today, it is known as the Vanguard Jazz Orchestra and has released several CDs.

== Playing style and approach ==
Lewis's cymbal work was considered unique among many musicians. Of his style, drummer Buddy Rich had remarked: "Mel Lewis doesn't sound like anybody else. He sounds like himself."

Lewis insisted on playing genuine Turkish-made cymbals, switching from the Zildjian Company later in his career to the Istanbul brand. His setup included a 21-inch ride on his right, a 19-inch crash-ride on his left, and his signature sound, a 22-inch swish "knocker" with rivets on his far right. The rather lightweight cymbals exuded a dark, overtone-rich sound. Lewis' wood-shell drums were considered warm and rich in their sound. He almost exclusively played a Gretsch drums set, although in later years, played Slingerland drums equipped with natural calfskin top heads. Regular mylar heads were used on the bottom. Lewis described a playing philosophy of not "pushing or pulling" but "supporting." "If you watch me, it doesn't look like I'm doing much," he remarked in an interview.

== Declining health and death ==
In the late 1980s, Lewis was diagnosed with melanoma. It was identified in his arm, then surfaced in his lungs, and ultimately went to his brain. He died on February 2, 1990, just days before his band was to celebrate its 24th anniversary at the Village Vanguard.

== Discography ==
- Mellifluous (Gatemouth, 1981)

=== Mel Lewis and the Orchestra ===
- Naturally (Telarc, 1979)
- Live in Montreux: Mel Lewis Plays Herbie Hancock (MPS, 1980))
- Live at the Village Vanguard...Featuring the Music of Bob Brookmeyer (1980)
- Mel Lewis and the Jazz Orchestra (Finesse, 1982)
- 20 Years at the Village Vanguard (Atlantic, 1985)
- The Definitive Thad Jones, Live from the Village Vangard (Nimbus, 1988)
- Definitive Thad Jones, Vol. 1 (MusicMasters, 1988)
- Definitive Thad Jones, Vol. 2 (MusicMasters, 1988)
- Soft Lights and Hot Music (MusicMasters, 1988)
- To You: A Tribute to Mel Lewis (MusicMasters, 1990)

=== Thad Jones/Mel Lewis Orchestra ===
- Opening Night (recorded 1966, released Alan Grant Presents, 2000)
- Presenting Thad Jones / Mel Lewis and the Jazz Orchestra (Solid State, 1966)
- Presenting Joe Williams and Thad Jones/Mel Lewis, the Jazz Orchestra (Solid State, 1966)
- Live at the Village Vanguard (Solid State, 1967)
- The Big Band Sound of Thad Jones / Mel Lewis Featuring Miss Ruth Brown (Solid State, 1968)
- Monday Night (Solid State, 1968)
- Central Park North (Solid State, 1969)
- Basle, 1969 (recorded 1969, released TCB, 1996)
- Consummation (Blue Note, 1970)
- Live in Tokyo (Denon, 1974)
- Potpourri (Philadelphia International, 1974)
- Thad Jones / Mel Lewis and Manuel De Sica (Pausa, 1974)
- Suite for Pops (A&M, 1975)
- New Life: Dedicated to Max Gordon (A&M, 1975)
- Thad Jones / Mel Lewis Orchestra With Rhoda Scott aka Rhoda Scott in New York with... (1976)
- Live in Munich (A&M, 1976)
- It Only Happens Every Time (1977) EMI – with Monica Zetterlund
- Body and Soul aka Thad Jones / Mel Lewis Orchestra in Europe (1978) West Wind – Live in Berlin
- A Touch of Class (West Wind, 1978) – Live in Warsaw

=== Thad Jones Mel Lewis Quartet ===
- The Thad Jones Mel Lewis Quartet (Artists House, 1978)

=== Mel Lewis ===
- Mel Lewis Sextet (Mode Records, 1957)
- Mel Lewis and Friends (A&M, 1977)

==== Video ====
- Jazz Casual – Thad Jones / Mel Lewis Orchestra... (recorded 1968) – a 1968 television appearance

==== Compilations ====
- The Blue Note Reissue Series: Thad Jones / Mel Lewis (Blue Note, recorded 1966 – 1970)
- The Complete Solid State Recordings of the Thad Jones / Mel Lewis Orchestra (recorded 1966 – 1970, Blue Note, 1994)
- In Europe (ITM, 2007)
- The Complete (Live in) Poland Concerts 1976 & 1978 (Gambit, 2009)

=== Jones and Lewis as guests with other orchestras ===
- Greetings and Salutations (1975) Town Crier – Jones, Lewis and Jon Faddis with the Swedish Radio Jazz Group, Stockholm
- Thad Jones, Mel Lewis and UMO (1977) RCA Records – Jones and Lewis with the UMO Jazz Orchestra, Helsinki

=== As sideman ===
With Pepper Adams

- Pepper Adams Quintet (Mode, 1957)
- Critic's Choice (World Pacific, 1957)
- Ephemera (Spotlite, 1973)

With Manny Albam

- Brass on Fire (Sold State, 1966)

With Frankie Avalon

- And Now About Mr. Avalon (Chancellor, 1961)

With Chet Baker

- Theme Music from "The James Dean Story" (World Pacific, 1956) with Bud Shank
- Once Upon a Summertime (Artists House, 1980)

With Tony Bennett

- I've Gotta Be Me (Columbia, 1969)

With Bob Brookmeyer

- Bob Brookmeyer Plays Bob Brookmeyer and Some Others (Clef, 1955)
- The Dual Role of Bob Brookmeyer (Prestige, 1955)
- 7 x Wilder (Verve, 1961)
- Gloomy Sunday and Other Bright Moments (Verve, 1961)
- Back Again (Sonet, 1978)

With Kenny Burrell

- Blue Bash! (Verve, 1963) – with Jimmy Smith
- Ellington Is Forever (Fantasy, 1975)

With Benny Carter

- Sax ala Carter! (United Artists, 1960)
- BBB & Co. (Swingville, 1962) with Ben Webster and Barney Bigard
- Central City Sketches (MusicMasters, 1987)

With Buck Clayton

- A Swingin' Dream (Stash, 1989)

With Al Cohn

- Son of Drum Suite (RCA Victor, 1960)
- Jazz Mission to Moscow (Colpix, 1962)
- Body and Soul (Muse, 1973) with Zoot Sims

With Bob Cooper

- Coop! The Music of Bob Cooper (Contemporary, 1958)

With Hank Crawford and Jimmy McGriff

- Soul Survivors (Milestone, 1986)

With Eddie Daniels

- First Prize! (Prestige, 1967)

With Eric Dolphy

- Live in Germany (Magnetic, 1992)

With Maynard Ferguson

- The Blues Roar (Mainstream, 1965)

With Dean Friedman

- Dean Friedman (Lifesong, 1977)

With Stan Getz

- Stan Getz Plays Music from the Soundtrack of Mickey One (MGM, 1965)

With Dizzy Gillespie

- The New Continent (Limelight, 1962)

With Jimmy Hamilton

- It's About Time (Swingville, 1961)

With Johnny Hodges

- Sandy's Gone (Verve, 1963)

With Thad Jones and Pepper Adams Quintet

- Mean What You Say (Milestone, 1966)

With Stan Kenton

- Contemporary Concepts (Capitol, 1955)
- Kenton in Hi-Fi (Capitol, 1956)
- Cuban Fire! (Capitol, 1956)
- Kenton with Voices (Capitol, 1957)
- The Ballad Style of Stan Kenton (Capitol, 1958)

With Morgana King

- With a Taste of Honey (Mainstream, 1964)
- Miss Morgana King (Reprise, 1965)
- A Taste of Honey (Mainstream, 1971)

With Jimmy Knepper

- Dream Dancing (Criss Cross, 1986)

With Peggy Lee

- Jump for Joy (Capitol, 1958)
- Sugar 'n' Spice (Capitol, 1962)
- Mink Jazz (Capitol, 1963)

With Joe Lovano

- Tones, Shapes & Colors (Soul Note, 1985)

With Johnny Mandel

- I Want to Live (United Artists, 1958)

With Herbie Mann

- Great Ideas of Western Mann (Riverside, 1957)
- The Magic Flute of Herbie Mann (Verve, 1957)
- Impressions of the Middle East (Atlantic, 1966)
- The Herbie Mann String Album (Atlantic, 1967)

With Warne Marsh

- Star Highs (Criss Cross Jazz, 1982)

With Jack McDuff

- Prelude (Prestige, 1963)

With Gary McFarland

- The Jazz Version of "How to Succeed in Business without Really Trying" (Verve, 1962)
- Point of Departure (Impulse!, 1963)
- Tijuana Jazz (Impulse!, 1965)

With Jimmy McGriff

- A Bag Full of Blues (Solid State, 1967)
- The Worm (Solid State, 1968)

With Melanie

- Stoneground Words (Neighborhood, 1972)

With Helen Merrill

- Chasin' the Bird (Inner City, 1980)
- Collaboration (EmArcy, 1988)

With James Moody

- Great Day (Argo, 1963)
- Moody and the Brass Figures (Milestone, 1966)

With Bette Midler

- Thighs and Whispers (Atlantic, 1979)

With Gerry Mulligan

- Gerry Mulligan Meets Johnny Hodges (Verve, 1959) with Johnny Hodges
- The Concert Jazz Band (Verve, 1960)
- Gerry Mulligan and the Concert Jazz Band at the Village Vanguard (Verve, 1961)
- Gerry Mulligan Presents a Concert in Jazz (Verve, 1961)
- Gerry Mulligan and the Concert Jazz Band on Tour (Verve, 1962)
- Two of a Mind (RCA Victor, 1962) with Paul Desmond
- Holliday with Mulligan (DRG, 1980) with Judy Holliday

With Mark Murphy

- This Could Be the Start of Something (Capitol, 1958)
- Mark Murphy's Hip Parade (Capitol, 1960)

With Anita O'Day

- Cool Heat (Verve, 1959)
- All the Sad Young Men (Verve, 1962)

With Chico O'Farrill

- Nine Flags (Impulse!, 1966)

With Esther Phillips

- And I Love Him! (Atlantic, 1966)

With Shorty Rogers

- Gigi in Jazz (RCA Victor, 1958)
- Chances Are It Swings (RCA Victor, 1958)
- The Wizard of Oz and Other Harold Arlen Songs (RCA Victor, 1959)
- The Swingin' Nutcracker (RCA Victor, 1960)
- Jazz Waltz (Reprise, 1962)
- An Invisible Orchard (RCA Victor, 1997)

With Pete Rugolo

- Percussion at Work (EmArcy, 1957)
- Behind Brigitte Bardot (Warner Bros., 1960)

With Sal Salvador

- Starfingers (Bee Hive, 1978)

With Shirley Scott

- Latin Shadows (Impulse!, 1965)

With Bud Shank

- Bud Shank - Shorty Rogers - Bill Perkins (Pacific Jazz, 1955)
- New Groove (Pacific Jazz, 1961)

With Frank Sinatra

- The Concert Sinatra (Reprise, 1963)
- Sinatra's Sinatra (Reprise, 1963)
- Softly, as I Leave You (Reprise, 1964)
- My Kind of Broadway (Reprise, 1965)

With Sonny Stitt

- Sonny Stitt Blows the Blues (Verve, 1959)
- Saxophone Supremacy (Verve, 1959)
- Sonny Stitt Swings the Most (Verve, 1959)

With Mel Tormé

- Mel Tormé and the Marty Paich Dek-Tette (Betlehem, 1956)
- Prelude to a Kiss (Tops, 1958)
- Back in Town (Verve, 1959)
- Mel Tormé Swings Shubert Alley (Verve, 1960)
- Swingin' on the Moon (Verve, 1960)

With Gerald Wilson

- You Better Believe It! (Pacific Jazz, 1961)
- Moment of Truth (Pacific Jazz, 1962)
- Portraits (Pacific Jazz, 1964)

With Jimmy Witherspoon

- Blues for Easy Livers (Prestige, 1965)

With Emily Yancy

- Yancy (Mainstream, 1965)

== Filmography ==
=== Concert performances ===
- 1999: Jazz at the Smithsonian (Kultur Video)
- 2003: Jazz Casual – Thad Jones & Mel Lewis and Woody Herman (Jazz Casual)
- 2005: Jazz Masters Series – Mel Lewis and the Jazz Orchestra (Shanachie)
- 2007: Mel Lewis and His Big Band (VIEW)

=== Film ===
- 1958: Kings Go Forth - Jazz Musician: Drums (uncredited)
