= Greetings and Salutations =

Studio album by Thad Jones, Mel Lewis and the Swedish Radio Orchestra
- Recorded: 1975 June 27, 28 Stockholm, Sweden
- Genre: Jazz
- Length: 40:33
- Label: Four Leaf Clover (Sweden) / Town Crier

alternative cover
- Town Crier cover

alternative cover
- Biograph Records cover

Professional ratings
Review scores
Source	Rating
Allmusic	2.5/5 stars
The Penguin Guide to Jazz Recordings	3.5/4 stars

Greetings and Salutations is a 1975 big band jazz album recorded by the Swedish Radio Jazz Group with Thad Jones, Mel Lewis and Jon Faddis as guest bandleader / performers. The album was nominated for a 1978 Grammy award in the Best Jazz Instrumental Performance - Big Band category.

== Track listing ==
1. "61st And Rich'it" – 8:15
2. "The Waltz You Swang For Me" – 7:23
3. "Forever Lasting" – 6:59
4. "Love To One" – 4:19
5. "Greetings And Salutations" – 13:37

additional bonus tracks on reissues (from 1977 recording session):

6. "Mach 2" (Scott) – 4:52
7. "Rhoda's Map" – 5:04
8. "My Centennial" – 9:48

== Personnel ==
Original 1975 recording session (tracks 1~5):

- Thad Jones – cornet
- Jon Faddis – trumpet
- Americo Bellotto – trumpet
- Bertil Lövgren – trumpet
- Jan Allan – trumpet
- Torgny Nilsson – trombone
- Lars Olofsson – trombone
- Bengt Edwardsson – trombone
- Sven Larson – trombone
- Lennart Åberg – tenor saxophone, soprano saxophone, flute
- Claes Rosendahl – alto saxophone, tenor saxophone, flute
- Erik Nilsson – baritone saxophone, bass clarinet, flute
- Wåge Finer – alto saxophone, tenor saxophone, flute
- Rune Falk – tenor saxophone, clarinet
- Håkan Nyquist – French horn
- Sven Åke Landström – French horn
- Kurt Puke – French horn
- Bengt Olsson – French horn
- Bo Juhlin – tuba
- Rune Gustafsson – guitar
- Bengt Hallberg – piano, electric piano
- Georg Riedel – bass
- Stefan Brolund – electric bass
- Egil Johansen – drums
- Mel Lewis – drums

1977 recording session (bonus tracks 6~8):

- Thad Jones – cornet
- Mel Lewis – drums
- ...
- Al Porcino – trumpet
- Arne Domnérus – reeds
- Bernt Rosengren – reeds
- ...
