= The Complete Solid State Recordings of the Thad Jones/Mel Lewis Orchestra =

Compilation album by The Thad Jones/Mel Lewis Jazz Orchestra
- Released: 1994
- Recorded: 1966–1970, New York City
- Genre: Jazz
- Label: Mosaic, Blue Note

Professional ratings
Review scores
Source	Rating
Allmusic	5/5 stars

The Complete Solid State Recordings of the Thad Jones/Mel Lewis Orchestra is a Mosaic Records limited edition compilation of all previously released songs from the five Solid State Records (later Blue Note) instrumental releases of the Thad Jones/Mel Lewis Jazz Orchestra. Several unissued and/or alternate takes from the original album recording sessions are also included as well as two songs previously released only as a single.

== Track listing ==
CD 1

1. "ABC Blues"
2. "Kids Are Pretty People"
3. "Don’t Ever Leave Me"
4. "Once Around"
5. "Three And One"
6. "Balanced Scales = Justice"
7. "Willow Weep For Me"
8. "Mean What You Say"
9. "Sophisticated Lady"
10. "Willow Tree"
11. "Hawaii"

CD 2

1. "The Little Pixie"
2. "A- That’s Freedom"
3. "The Second Race"
4. "Willow Tree"
5. "Quietude"
6. "Bachafillen"
7. "Lover Man"
8. "Mornin’ Reverend"

CD 3

1. "Samba Con Getchu"
2. "Willow Tree"
3. "Don’t Git Sassy"
4. "Say It Softly"
5. "Mornin’ Reverend"
6. "Kids Are Pretty People"
7. "The Second Race"

CD 4

1. "St. Louis Blues"
2. "The Waltz You Swang For Me"
3. "Central Park North"
4. "Jive Samba"
5. "Quietude"
6. "Big Dipper"
7. "Tow Away Zone"
8. "The Groove Merchant"

CD 5

1. "Consummation"
2. "Dedication"
3. "Tiptoe"
4. "It Only Happens Every Time"
5. "Fingers"
6. "Us"
7. "A Child Is Born"
8. "Ahunk Ahunk"

== Personnel ==
See personnel listing of original recordings:
