= Jimmy Nottingham =

American jazz musician (1925–1978)

James Edward Nottingham, Jr. (December 15, 1925 – November 16, 1978), also known as Sir James, was an American jazz trumpeter and flugelhorn player.

He was born in New York, United States, and started performing professionally in 1943 in Brooklyn with Cecil Payne and Max Roach.

He served in the Navy in 1944-45, where he played in Willie Smith's band. It was while working with Lionel Hampton (1945–47), that he earned his reputation as a high-note player. Following this, in 1947 he worked with Charlie Barnet, Lucky Millinder (and again c. 1950), Count Basie (1948–50), and Herbie Fields. He played Latin jazz from 1951–53, and was hired by CBS as a staff musician in 1954.

He worked for more than 20 years at CBS, and played jazz music in his spare time, co-leading a band with Budd Johnson (1962), and as a sideman with many orchestras, including those of Dizzy Gillespie, Oliver Nelson, Benny Goodman, Thad Jones/Mel Lewis (1966–70), and Clark Terry (1974-75). His only recordings as a leader were four songs for Seeco Records in 1957.

Jimmy Nottingham died in November 1978, at the age of 52.

== Discography ==
=== As sideman ===
With Mose Allison

- Hello There, Universe (Atlantic, 1970)

With Joe Cain

- Latin Explosion (Time Records, 1960)

With Count Basie

- The Count Basie Story (Roulette, 1960)

With Kenny Burrell

- Blues - The Common Ground (Verve, 1968)

With Maynard Ferguson

- The Blues Roar (Mainstream, 1965)

With Dizzy Gillespie

- Afro (Norgran, 1954)
- Dizzy and Strings (Norgran, 1954)

With Coleman Hawkins

- The Hawk in Hi Fi (RCA Victor, 1956)

With Quincy Jones

- Quincy Plays for Pussycats (Mercury, 1959-65 [1965])

With Jimmy McGriff

- The Big Band (Solid State, 1966)

With Oliver Nelson

- The Spirit of '67 with Pee Wee Russell (Impulse!, 1967)

With Chico O'Farrill

- Nine Flags (Impulse!, 1966)

With Shirley Scott

- For Members Only (Impulse!, 1963)
- Great Scott!! (Impulse!, 1964)
- Roll 'Em: Shirley Scott Plays the Big Bands (Impulse!, 1966)

With Sonny Stitt

- Sonny Stitt Plays Arrangements from the Pen of Quincy Jones (Roost, 1955)

With Big Joe Turner

- Boss of the Blues (Atlantic 1956)
- Big Joe Rides Again (Atlantic 1960)
