= Solid State Records (jazz label) =

Defunct jazz record label

- Parent company: United Artists Records
- Founded: 1966
- Founder: Phil Ramone; Sonny Lester; Manny Albam
- Genre: Jazz
- Country of origin: U.S.

Solid State Records was a jazz record label formed in 1966 by producers Sonny Lester and Phil Ramone, with arranger Manny Albam.

The label released original recordings in the mid to late 1960s by Joe Williams, Chick Corea, Jimmy McGriff, Dizzy Gillespie, the Thad Jones/Mel Lewis Jazz Orchestra and many others before its jazz artists were consolidated under United Artists' Blue Note label.

== Discography ==
=== Albums ===
#	Leader	Album	Year
SS-93	Various artists	Demonstration Record: Highlights From Solid State	
SS-94	Various artists	You've Got To Hear It To Believe It	
SS-18000	Manny Albam	Brass on Fire	1966
SS-18001	Jimmy McGriff	The Big Band	1966
SS-18002	Jimmy McGriff	A Bag Full of Soul	1966
SS-18003	Thad Jones/Mel Lewis	Presenting Thad Jones/Mel Lewis and the Jazz Orchestra	1966
SS-18004	Kokee Band	Exotica 1970	1966
SS-18005	Will Bronson	Will Bronson Presents The In Crowd Singers	1966
SS-18006	Jimmy McGriff	Cherry	1966
SS-18007	Manny Albam and the Passion Guitars	Introducing the Passion Guitars	1966
SS-18008	Thad Jones/Mel Lewis	Presenting Joe Williams	1966
SS-18009	Manny Albam	The Soul of the City	1966
SS-18010	Kokee Band	Hawaii And Other Exotic Movie Themes	1966
SS-18011	Will Bronson	The Best of Broadway	
SS-18012	Ted Sommer	Percussive Mariachi	1967
SS-18013	Nelson Riddle	Music for Wives and Lovers	1967
SS-18014	Johnny Lytle	A Man and a Woman	1967
SS-18015	Joe Williams	Something Old, New and Blue	1967
SS-18016	Thad Jones/Mel Lewis	Live At The Village Vanguard	1967
SS-18017	Jimmy McGriff	A Bag Full of Blues	1967
SS-18018	Bill Evans/Jim Hall	Undercurrent	1968 - Originally released as UAJ 14003 in 1962
SS-18019	Charles Mingus	Wonderland	1968 - Originally released as UAL 4036 in 1959
SS-18020	Herbie Mann	Jazz Impressions of Brazil	1968 - Originally released as UAJ 14009 in 1962
SS-18021	King Pleasure	Mr. Jazz	1968 - Originally released as UAJ 14012 in 1962
SS-18022	Duke Ellington	Money Jungle	1968 - Originally released as UAJ 14017 in 1963
SS-18023	Herbie Mann	St. Thomas	1968 - Originally released as UAJ 14022 in 1962
SS-18024	Charles Mingus	Town Hall Concert	1968 - Originally released as UAJ 14024 in 1962
SS-18025	John Coltrane	Coltrane Time	1968 - Originally released as UAL 4014 in 1959
SS-18026	Johnny Lytle	The Sound of Velvet Soul	1968
SS-18027	Dizzy Gillespie	Jazz for a Sunday Afternoon Volume 1	1967
SS-18028	Dizzy Gillespie	Jazz for a Sunday Afternoon Volume 2	1967
SS-18029	Mike Mainieri	Insight	1968
SS-18030	Jimmy McGriff	I've Got a New Woman	1967
SS-18031	Billy Strayhorn	The Peaceful Side of Billy Strayhorn	1968 - Originally released as UAJ 14010 in 1963 recorded 1959
SS-18032	Count Basie	Basie Meets Bond	1968 - Originally released a UAL 3480 in 1966
SS-18033	Art Blakey and the Jazz Messengers	Three Blind Mice	1967 - Originally released as UAJ 14002 in 1962
SS-18034	Dizzy Gillespie	Live at the Village Vanguard	1967
SS-18035	Modern Jazz Quartet	On Tour	1969 - Originally released as UAL 4063 in 1959
SS-18036	Jimmy McGriff	Honey	1968
SS-18037	Various Artists	Jazz for a Sunday Afternoon Vol. 3	1967
SS-18038	Vi Redd	Birdcall	1968 - Originally released as UAJ 14016 in 1962
SS-18039	Chick Corea	Now He Sings, Now He Sobs	1968
SS-18040	Billie Holiday	Ladylove	1969 - Originally released as UAJ 14014 in 1962 recorded in 1954
SS-18041	Thad Jones/Mel Lewis	The Big Band Sound featuring Miss Ruth Brown	1968
SS-18042	Soul Strings	Soul Strings and a Funky Horn	1968
SS-18043	Chico Hamilton	The Gamut	1967
SS-18044	Johnny Lytle	Be Proud	1969
SS-18045	Jimmy McGriff	The Worm	1968
SS-18046	Monk Higgins	Extra Soul Perception	1969
SS-18047	Sonny Stitt	Little Green Apples	1968
SS-18048	Thad Jones/Mel Lewis	Monday Night	1968
SS-18049	Mike Mainieri	Journey Thru an Electric Tube	1969
SS-18050	Chico Hamilton	The Head Hunters	1969
SS-18051	Randy Brecker	Score	1969
SS-18052	Various Artists	Jazz for a Sunday Afternoon Volume 4	1969
SS-18053	Jimmy McGriff	Step 1	1968
SS-18054	Dizzy Gillespie	It's My Way	1969
SS-18055	Chick Corea	Is	1969
SS-18056	Johnny Lytle	Close Enough for Jazz	1969
SS-18057	Sonny Stitt	Come Hither	1968
SS-18058	Thad Jones/Mel Lewis	Central Park North	1969
SS-18059	Jeremy Steig	This Is Jeremy Steig	1969
SS-18060	Jimmy McGriff	A Thing to Come By	1969
SS-18061	Dizzy Gillespie	Cornucopia	1969
SS-18062	Ray Nance	Body and Soul	1969
SS-18063	Jimmy McGriff	The Way You Look Tonight	1969
SS-18064	Earth Disciples	Getaway Train	1969
SS-18065	Wali & The Afro Caravan	Home Lost and Found the Natural Sound	1969
SS-18066	Candido Camero	Thousand Finger Man	1969
SS-18067			
SS-18068	Jeremy Steig	Legwork	1967
SS-19000	Duke Ellington	70th Birthday Concert	1969
