= Thad Jones =

American jazz trumpeter (1923–1986)

- Born: Thaddeus Joseph Jones; March 28, 1923; Pontiac, Michigan, U.S.
- Died: August 20, 1986 (aged 63); Copenhagen, Denmark
- Occupations: Musician; composer; arranger; bandleader
- Relatives: Hank Jones; Elvin Jones
- Musical career
- Genres: Jazz
- Instruments: Trumpet; cornet; flugelhorn
- Years active: 1954–1986
- Labels: A&M; Blue Note, Metrojazz, Debut
- Formerly of: Count Basie Orchestra; DR Big Band; The Thad Jones/Mel Lewis Orchestra

Thaddeus Joseph Jones (March 28, 1923 – August 20, 1986) was an American jazz trumpeter, composer and bandleader who has been called "one of the all-time greatest jazz trumpet soloists".

== Early life, family and education ==
Thad Jones was born in Pontiac, Michigan, to Henry and Olivia Jones, a musical family of 10 (an older brother was pianist Hank Jones and a younger brother was drummer Elvin Jones). A self-taught musician, Thad began performing professionally at the age of 16. He served in U.S. Army bands during World War II (1943–1946).

Many years later, while teaching jazz at the Royal Danish Conservatory in Copenhagen, Jones studied composition formally. He also began learning the valve trombone.

== Career ==
After his military service, which included an association with the US Military School of Music and working with area bands in Des Moines, Iowa; and Oklahoma City, Oklahoma, Jones became a member of the Count Basie Orchestra in May 1954. He was featured as a soloist on such well-known tunes as "April in Paris", "Shiny Stockings", and "Corner Pocket". However, his main contribution to Basie's organization was nearly two dozen arrangements and compositions, which included "The Deacon", "H.R.H." (Her Royal Highness – in honor of the band's command performance in London), "Counter Block", and lesser known tracks such as "Speaking of Sounds". His hymn-like ballad "To You" was performed by the Basie band combined with the Duke Ellington Orchestra in their only recording together, and the recording Dance Along With Basie contains nearly an entire album of Jones's uncredited arrangements of standard tunes. In 1959, Jones played cornet on Thelonious Monk's 5 by Monk by 5 album.

Jones left the Basie Orchestra in 1963 to become a freelance arranger and musician in New York City. In 1965, he and drummer Mel Lewis formed the Thad Jones/Mel Lewis Orchestra. The group started with informal late-night jam sessions among New York City's top studio musicians. They began performing at the Village Vanguard in February 1966, to wide acclaim, and continued with Jones in the lead for 12 years. They won a 1978 Grammy Award for their album Live in Munich.

Jones taught at William Paterson College in New Jersey. At what is now the Thad Jones Archive site, pencil scores and vintage photos are available as part of the Living Jazz Archives.

After abruptly relocating to Copenhagen (as had several other US jazz musicians), he became the leader of The Danish Radio Big Band, Jones transformed the Danish Radio Big Band into one of the world's best. The result can be heard on a live-recording from the Montmartre in Copenhagen. In July 1979, Jones formed a new big band, Eclipse, with which he recorded a live album, Eclipse. Several Americans were on the album: pianist Horace Parlan, baritonist Sahib Shihab, trumpeter Tim Hagans, and trombonist/vocalist Richard B. Boone. The rest of the band comprised trombonists Bjarne Thanning and Ture Larsen, trumpeter Lars Togeby, altoists Ole Thøger and Michael Hove, tenor saxophonist Bent Jædig, and bassist Jesper Lundgaard. Jones further composed for the Danish Radio Big Band and taught jazz at the Royal Danish Conservatory in Copenhagen. He studied composition formally during this period, and also took up the valve trombone. In later years, his playing ability was diminished due to a lip injury, but his composing and arranging skills blossomed. His best-known composition is the standard "A Child Is Born".

In February 1985, Jones returned to the US to take over the leadership of the Count Basie Orchestra, upon his former leader's death. Jones fronted the Basie band on numerous tours, also writing arrangements for recordings and performances with vocalist Caterina Valente and the Manhattan Transfer, but had to step down due to ill health.

== Personal life ==
Jones had a daughter Thedia and a son Bruce from his first marriage in the US.

In January 1979, Jones suddenly moved to Copenhagen, Denmark, to the great surprise of his New York bandmates. He married a Danish woman, Lis. They named their son Thaddeus Joseph William Jones (born January 4,1980).

Jones returned to the US in 1985 to lead the Count Basie Orchestra after his former leader's death. Jones' decline in health caused him to retire from performing. He returned to his home in Copenhagen for the last few months of his life. He died of cancer on August 20, 1986, aged 63, at Herlev Hospital. He is buried in Copenhagen's Vestre Kirkegård Cemetery (Western Churchyard Cemetery).

Thad Jones Vej (Thad Jones Street) in southern Copenhagen is named for Jones.

== Discography ==
=== As leader/co-leader ===
- The Fabulous Thad Jones (Debut, 1954)
- Detroit–New York Junction (Blue Note, 1956)
- The Magnificent Thad Jones (Blue Note, 1956)
- The Magnificent Thad Jones Vol.3 (Blue Note, 1956)
- Mad Thad (Period, 1957)
- Sonny Rollins Plays (Period, 1957) split album with Sonny Rollins
- The Jones Boys (Period, 1957) with Jimmy Jones, Eddie Jones, Quincy Jones and Jo Jones
- Olio (Prestige, 1957) with Frank Wess, Teddy Charles, Mal Waldron, Doug Watkins, Elvin Jones
- After Hours (Prestige, 1957) with – Frank Wess, Kenny Burrell, Mal Waldron, Paul Chambers, Art Taylor
- Keepin' Up with the Joneses (MetroJazz, 1958) as The Jones Brothers with Hank Jones and Elvin Jones
- Motor City Scene (United Artists, 1959)
- Mean What You Say (Milestone, 1966) by the Thad Jones/Pepper Adams Quintet
- Greetings and Salutations (Four Leaf Clover, 1977) with Mel Lewis, Jon Faddis and the Swedish Radio Jazz Group (Lennart Åberg, Arne Domnérus, Bengt Hallberg, Georg Riedel, Rune Gustafsson, ...)
- The Thad Jones Mel Lewis Quartet (Artists House, 1978) with Mel Lewis, Harold Danko, Rufus Reid
- Thad Jones, Mel Lewis and UMO (RCA, 1978) with Mel Lewis and UMO (the Finnish 'New Music Orchestra')
- Live at Montmartre (Storyville, 1978) with Idrees Sulieman, Allan Botschinsky, Jesper Thilo, NHOP
- A tribute to Monk and Bird (Tomato, 1978) with George Adams, George Lewis, Stanley Cowell, Reggie Workman, Lenny White, Heiner Stadler
- Eclipse (Metronome, 1979) with Tim Hagans, Sahib Shihab, Horace Parlan, Jesper Lundgaard
- Jazz Gala 79 (America, 1979) with Carmen McRae, Joe Williams, Claude Bolling, Cat Anderson – live in Midem
- Live at Slukefter (Metronome, 1980) with Tim Hagans, Sahib Shihab, Horace Parlan, Jesper Lundgaard

=== With the Thad Jones / Mel Lewis Orchestra ===
- Presenting Thad Jones / Mel Lewis and the Jazz Orchestra (Solid State Records, 1966)
- Presenting Joe Williams and Thad Jones / Mel Lewis, The Jazz Orchestra (Solid State, 1966)
- Live at the Village Vanguard (Solid State, 1967)
- The Big Band Sound of Thad Jones/Mel Lewis featuring Miss Ruth Brown (Solid State, 1968)
- Monday Night (Solid State, 1968) – live
- Central Park North (Solid State, 1969)
- Consummation (Solid State/Blue Note, 1970)
- Live in Tokyo (Denon Jazz, 1974)
- Potpourri (Philadelphia International, 1974)
- Thad Jones / Mel Lewis and Manuel De Sica (Pausa, 1974)
- Suite for Pops (Horizon/A&M, 1975)
- New Life: Dedicated to Max Gordon (A&M, 1975)
- Thad Jones / Mel Lewis Orchestra With Rhoda Scott (Barclay, 1976) – a.k.a. Rhoda Scott in New York with...
- Live in Munich (Horizon/A&M, 1976)
- It Only Happens Every Time with Monica Zetterlund (EMI Records, 1978) – recorded in 1977
- Body and Soul (West Wind Jazz, 1978) – Live in Berlin. a.k.a. Thad Jones / Mel Lewis Orchestra in Europe
- A Touch of Class (West Wind Jazz, 1978) – Live in Warsaw
- Basle, 1969 (TCB Music, 1996) – recorded in 1969
- Opening Night (Alan Grant Presents, 2000) – recorded in 1966

=== With DR Big Band ===
As chief conductor

- By Jones, I think we've got it (Metronome/Atlantic, 1978) – recorded live at Jazzhus Montmartre, Copenhagen
- A good time was had by all (Metronome/Storyville, 1979) – recorded live at Jazzhus Montmartre, Copenhagen in 1978

=== As sideman ===
With Count Basie

- Basie (Clef, 1954)
- Count Basie Swings, Joe Williams Sings (Clef, 1955) with Joe Williams
- April in Paris (Verve, 1956)
- The Greatest!! Count Basie Plays, Joe Williams Sings Standards with Joe Williams
- Metronome All-Stars 1956 (Clef, 1956) with Ella Fitzgerald and Joe Williams
- Basie in London (Verve, 1956)
- One O'Clock Jump (Verve, 1957) with Joe Williams and Ella Fitzgerald
- Count Basie at Newport (Verve, 1957)
- The Atomic Mr. Basie (Roulette, 1957) – aka Basie and E=MC^{2}
- Basie Plays Hefti (Roulette, 1958)
- Sing Along with Basie (Roulette, 1958) – with Joe Williams and Lambert, Hendricks & Ross
- Hall of Fame (Verve, 1959) – recorded in 1956
- Basie One More Time (Roulette, 1959)
- Breakfast Dance and Barbecue (Roulette, 1959)
- Everyday I Have the Blues (Roulette, 1959) – with Joe Williams
- Dance Along with Basie (Roulette, 1959)
- Not Now, I'll Tell You When (Roulette, 1960)
- The Count Basie Story (Roulette, 1960)
- Kansas City Suite (Roulette, 1960)
- The Legend (Roulette, 1961)
- Back with Basie (Roulette, 1962)
- Basie in Sweden (Roulette, 1962)
- On My Way & Shoutin' Again! (Verve, 1962)
- This Time by Basie! (Reprise, 1963)

With Bob Brookmeyer

- Jazz Is a Kick (Mercury, 1960)
- Back Again (Sonet, 1978)

With Kenny Burrell

- Blues - The Common Ground (Verve, 1968) – recorded in 1967–1968
- Ellington Is Forever (Fantasy, 1975)
- Ellington Is Forever Volume Two (Fantasy, 1977) – recorded in 1975

With Dexter Gordon

- Ca'Purange (Prestige, 1973) – recorded in 1972
- Tangerine (Prestige, 1975) – recorded in 1972

With Coleman Hawkins

- Coleman Hawkins and His Orchestra (Crown, 1960)
- The Hawk Swings (Crown, 1961) – recorded in 1960

With Elvin Jones

- Elvin! (Riverside, 1962) – recorded in 1961–1962
- And Then Again (Atlantic, 1965)
- Midnight Walk (Atlantic, 1966)
- Mr. Jones (Blue Note, 1973) – recorded in 1972

With Oliver Nelson

- More Blues and the Abstract Truth (Impulse!, 1965) – recorded in 1964
- The Spirit of '67 with Pee Wee Russell (Impulse!, 1967)

With Shirley Scott

- For Members Only (Impulse!, 1963)
- Roll 'Em: Shirley Scott Plays the Big Bands (Impulse!, 1966)

With Sonny Stitt

- Sonny Stitt Plays Arrangements from the Pen of Quincy Jones (Roost, 1955)
- Stitt Goes Latin (Roost, 1963)
- Broadway Soul (Colpix, 1965)
- Goin' Down Slow (Prestige, 1972)

With Ben Webster

- Soulmates (with Joe Zawinul) (Riverside, 1963)
- See You at the Fair (Impulse, 1964)

With Frank Wess

- Yo Ho! Poor You, Little Me (Prestige, 1963)
- Opus de Blues (Savoy, 1984) – recorded in 1959

With others

- Pepper Adams, Pepper Adams Plays the Compositions of Charlie Mingus (Workshop Jazz, 1964) – recorded in 1963
- Manny Albam, Brass on Fire (Sold State, 1966)
- Louis Armstrong, Louis Armstrong and His Friends (Flying Dutchman/Amsterdam, 1971) – recorded in 1970
- Al Cohn, Four Brass One Tenor (RCA Victor, 1955)
- Lou Donaldson, Sassy Soul Strut (1973)
- Kenny Drew, Lite Flite (SteepleChase, 1977)
- Curtis Fuller, Imagination (Savoy, 1960) – recorded in 1959
- Herbie Hancock, Speak Like a Child (Blue Note, 1968)
- Milt Jackson, For Someone I Love (Riverside, 1963)
- J. J. Johnson, J.J.! (RCA Victor, 1965) – recorded in 1964
- Osie Johnson, Swingin' Sounds (Jazztone, 1955)
- Hank Jones, Groovin' High (Muse, 1978)
- Yusef Lateef, Yusef Lateef's Detroit (Atlantic, 1969)
- Charles Mingus, The Jazz Experiments of Charlie Mingus (Bethlehem, 1955) – recorded in 1954
- Billy Mitchell, A Little Juicy (Smash, 1964) – recorded in 1963
- Thelonious Monk, 5 by Monk by 5 (Riverside, 1959)
- James Moody, Great Day (Argo, 1963)
- Houston Person, Houston Express (Prestige, 1971)
- Paul Quinichette, The Kid From Denver (Dawn, 1956)
- Johnny "Hammond" Smith, Open House! (Riverside, 1963)
- McCoy Tyner, Today and Tomorrow (Impulse!, 1964) – recorded in 1963–1964
- Joe Williams, At Newport '63 (RCA Victor, 1963)
- Phil Woods, Round Trip (Verve, 1969)
- Various Artists, Leonard Feather's West Coast Vs. East Coast Allstars -- A Battle Of Jazz (MGM, 1956)

=== As arranger ===
With Harry James

- New Versions Of Down Beat Favorites (MGM E4265/SE4265, 1965)
- Our Leader! (Dot DLP 3801/DLP 25801, 1967)
- The King James Version (Sheffield Lab LAB 3, 1976)
- Comin' From A Good Place (Sheffield Lab LAB 6, 1977)
- Still Harry After All These Years (Sheffield Lab LAB 11, 1979)
