= Ed Xiques =

American jazz saxophonist (1939–2020)

- Birth name: Edward Fabian Xiques
- Born: October 9, 1939; Staten Island, New York, U.S.
- Origin: Pelham Manor, New York, U.S.
- Died: December 4, 2020 (aged 81); Las Cruces, New Mexico, U.S.
- Genres: Jazz
- Instruments: Baritone saxophone

Edward Fabian "Ed" Xiques, Jr. (born October 9, 1939 – December 4, 2020) was an American jazz saxophonist.

== Early life and education ==
Xiques was born on Staten Island and raised in Pelham Manor, New York. When he was nine years old, his father gave him a soprano saxophone, which he carried to school every day, wrapped in a blanket. Xiques received his bachelor's degree in music education from Boston University in 1962, where he played with Jaki Byard and Herb Pomeroy.

== Career ==
After graduating from college, Xiques taught in New York schools for much of the 1960s, and played on the side with Buddy Morrow, Les and Larry Elgart, Duke Pearson, and Woody Herman. He worked full-time as a musician from 1968, playing extensively with the Thad Jones-Mel Lewis Orchestra in the 1970s as well as with Ten Wheel Drive, Frank Foster, Bill Watrous' Manhattan Wildlife Refuge and McCoy Tyner.

In the 1980s, he worked frequently with Toshiko Akiyoshi and Liza Minnelli, and later was a member of the Westchester Jazz Orchestra, the New York Jazz Repertory Company, Diana Moser's Composers Big Band, and the groups of Mario Bauza and Maria Schneider. From the late 1990s until his retirement in 2018, he taught music at Vassar College.

== Personal life ==
Xiques most recently lived in Truth or Consequences, New Mexico. He died December 4, 2020, in Las Cruces, New Mexico.

== Discography ==
- Spacewalk (Edex Records, 1994)
- Little Bear (Edex Records, 1988).
- Keep the Dream Alive (Prestige, 1978)
