= Live at the Five Spot =

Live at the Five Spot and variants thereof usually refer to releases of performances recorded at the Five Spot Café in New York, including:

- Thelonious Monk: Live at the Five Spot: Discovery! (1958 recordings; 1993 release)
- Thelonious Monk: Thelonious in Action (Riverside, 1958)
- Thelonious Monk: Misterioso (Thelonious Monk album) (Riverside, 1958)
- Thelonious Monk: At the Five Spot (Thelonious Monk album) (above 1958 recordings; 1977 reissue)
- Thelonious Monk: Complete Live at The Five Spot 1958 (above 1958 recordings; 2009 reissue)
- Pepper Adams: 10 to 4 at the 5 Spot (Riverside, 1958)
- Kenny Burrell: On View at the Five Spot Cafe (Blue Note, 1959)
- Randy Weston: Live at the Five Spot (Randy Weston album) (United Artists, 1959)
- George Russell: George Russell Sextet at the Five Spot (Decca, 1960)
- Eric Dolphy: At the Five Spot, Volumes 1 & 2 (New Jazz, 1961)
- Eric Dolphy: Memorial Album: Recorded Live At the Five Spot (Prestige, 1965 reissue)
- Joey DeFrancesco: Live at the 5 Spot (Columbia, 1993)
