= Walter Norris =

American jazz musician

Walter Norris (December 27, 1931 – October 29, 2011) was an American pianist and composer.

== Biography ==
=== Early life and career ===
Born in Little Rock, Arkansas, on December 27, 1931, Norris first studied piano at home with his mother, then with John Summers, a local church organist. His first professional performances were with the Howard Williams Band in and around Little Rock during his junior high and high school years. After graduating from high school, Norris played briefly with Mose Allison, then did a two-year tour in the US Air Force. After his time in the Air Force, Norris played with Jimmy Ford in Houston, Texas, then moved to Los Angeles where he became an integral part of the West Coast Jazz scene. While in Los Angeles, he played on Jack Sheldon's first album and on Ornette Coleman's first album, Something Else! The Music of Ornette Coleman (1958) for Contemporary Records.

In 1960, Norris relocated to New York City and formed a trio with guitarist Billy Bean and bassist Hal Gaylor, and the group made one album. Norris took a job at the New York City Playboy Club in 1963 and in time became the club's director of entertainment, remaining there until 1970. From 1970 to 1974, Norris was a freelance performer and taught in the New York area. In 1974, he replaced Roland Hanna in the Thad Jones-Mel Lewis Band. After a tour of Scandinavia, he remained in Europe to record a duo album with double bass player George Mraz, titled Drifting.

Returning to the states, Norris joined the Charles Mingus Quintet in 1976. In the dressing room prior to a performance, according to Norris, he made the mistake of calling the temperamental Mingus "Charlie" instead of "Charles," which angered Mingus. At that moment, the stage manager entered the room and told the musicians they were needed onstage immediately, which provided a temporary escape from confrontation. Norris quit the band and accepted a job in Berlin, Germany, as pianist with the Sender Freies Berlin-Orchestra. He moved to Berlin in January 1977 and lived there from that point. He insisted that his fear of Mingus was the primary cause of the move to Europe.

=== Later career ===
In 1990, Norris signed a five-album contract with Concord Records. The resulting recordings were all significant, but especially Sunburst (with saxophonist Joe Henderson), Hues of Blues (with George Mraz), and the Live at Maybeck Recital Hall solo piano album. In 1998, without a record contract, Norris self-financed the album From Another Star, made in New York with bassist Mike Richmond, pressing 1,000 copies.

A documentary film directed by Chuck Dodson, Walter Norris, a documentary, was completed in 2010. In 2005 an autobiography, "In Search of Musical Perfection" and method book "Essentials for Pianist Improvisers" were released. In July 2006, Norris recorded at his home in Berlin with Los Angeles bassist Putter Smith.

He died on October 29, 2011, at his home in Berlin, Germany, and is survived by his wife, Kirsten. His other descendants were two daughters from his previous marriage to Mandy, Dinah and Delia (deceased), and two granddaughters, Emily and Holly.

== Discography ==
=== As leader ===
- The Trio (Riverside, 1961) with Hal Gaylor, Billy Bean
- Drifting (Enja, 1974) with George Mraz
- Synchronicity (Enja, 1978) with Aladár Pege
- Stepping on Cracks (Progressive, 1978) with George Mraz, Ronnie Bedford
- Winter Rose (Enja, 1980) with Aladár Pege
- Lush Life (Concord Jazz, 1991) with Neil Swainson, Harold Jones
- Live at Maybeck Recital Hall, Volume Four (Concord, 1990)
- Sunburst (Concord, 1991) with Joe Henderson, Larry Grenadier, Mike Hyman
- Love Every Moment (Concord, 1992) with Putter Smith, Larance Marable
- Hues of Blues (Concord, 1995)
- From Another Star (Sunburst, 1998) with Mike Richmond
- The Last Set Live at the A-Trane (ACT, 2012) with Leszek Możdżer

=== As sideman ===
With Pepper Adams

- Julian (Enja, 1976)
- Twelfth & Pingree (Enja, 1976)

With The Thad Jones / Mel Lewis Orchestra

- New Life (1975)

With Ornette Coleman

- Something Else!!!! (1958)
