= Five Spot Café =

Jazz club located in New York City

- "the Five Spot"
- Former names: Bowery Café (1937–1951); No. 5 Bar (1951–1956); Two Saints (1974–1976)
- Address: 5 Cooper Square (1956–1962); 2 St. Marks Place (1962–1967); New York City; United States
- Type: Jazz club

Construction
- Opened: 1956
- Closed: 1967

The Five Spot Café was a jazz club located at 5 Cooper Square (1956–1962), in the Bowery neighborhood of New York City, between the East and West Village. In 1962, it moved to 2 St. Marks Place until closing in 1967. Its friendly, non-commercial, and low-key atmosphere with affordable drinks and food and cutting edge bebop and progressive jazz attracted a host of avant-garde artists and writers. It was a venue of historic significance as well, a mecca for musicians, both local and out-of-state, who packed the small venue to listen to many of the most creative composers and performers of the era.

== Early history ==
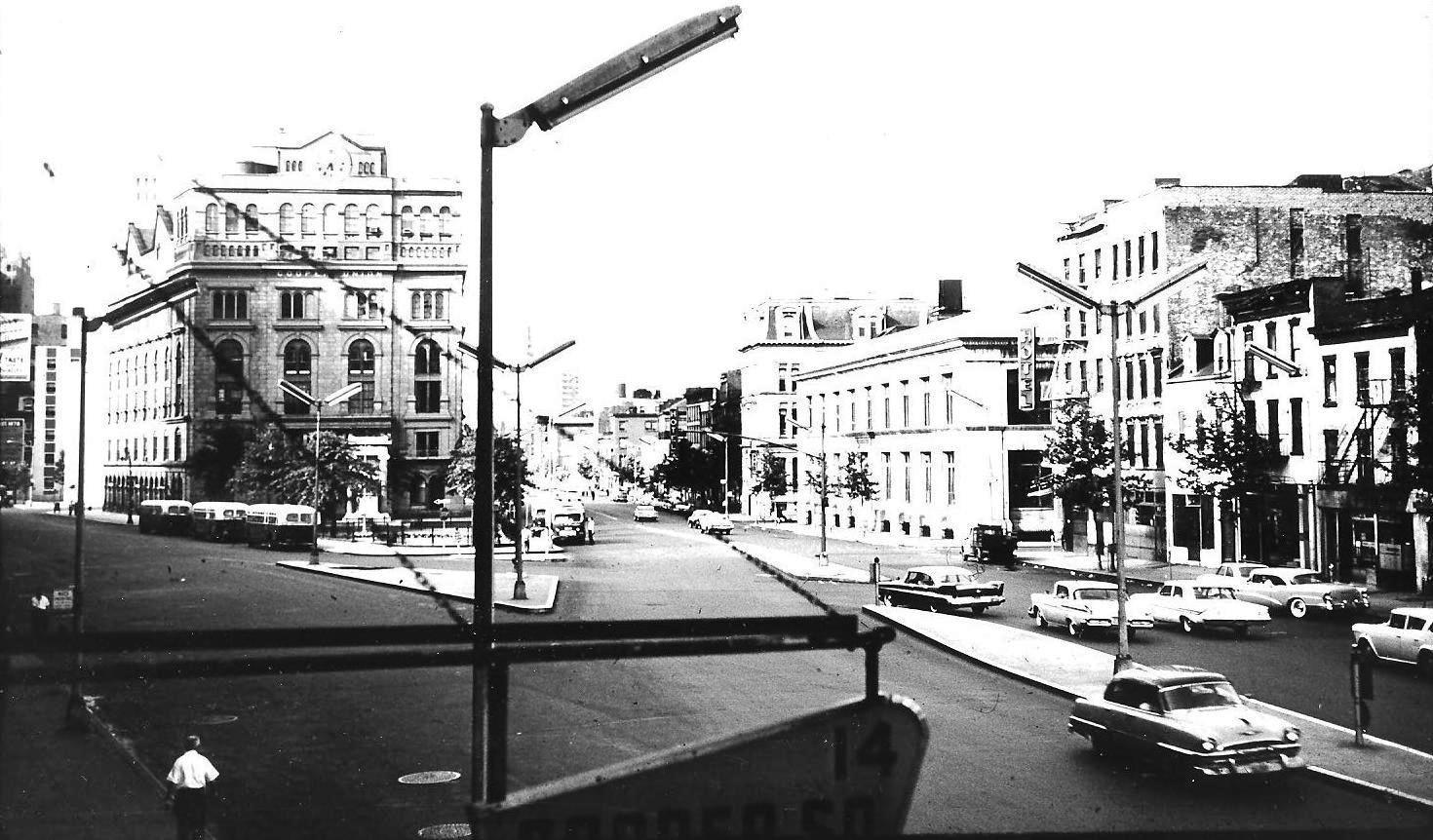
Cooper Square, New York, 1957

In 1937, Salvatore Termini (born 1884) purchased what was then known as the Bowery Café, a working-class bar located under the Third Avenue El. In 1946, two of Termini's sons, Joe and Ignatze (Iggy), returned from the war and helped run the bar. In 1951, the sons purchased the business from their father and renamed it the No. 5 Bar.

In late 1955, the Third Avenue El was demolished and the city embarked on a revitalization of the Bowery, which had deteriorated to become a skid row. During this time, many artists were drawn to the area due to the cheaper rents, as compared to Greenwich Village. Pianist Don Shoemaker was among the influx of artists who moved to the Bowery. Occupying a studio at 1 Cooper Square above the No. 5 Bar, Shoemaker hosted jam sessions during which he would purchase beer from the Terminis. Shoemaker eventually told Joe that if the bar would purchase a piano, he and his band would play. Joe bought a used upright piano, received a cabaret license on August 30, 1956, and opened a week later under the name the Five Spot Café.

== Leading jazz venue ==
Many musicians lived nearby and frequented the sessions, including Elvin Jones and Blossom Dearie. Some, like Lester Young, hung out, while others, such as Cannonball Adderley, sat in. It shared many patrons with the nearby Cedar Tavern; artists including David Smith, Willem de Kooning, Franz Kline, Joan Mitchell, Alfred Leslie, Larry Rivers, Grace Hartigan, Jack Tworkov, Michael Goldberg, Roy Newell, and Howard Kanovitz, as well as writers and poets Jack Kerouac, Allen Ginsberg, Frank O'Hara, Ted Joans, and Gregory Corso who began to frequent the club. The Baroness Nica de Koenigswarter was a regular. Even Paul Newman came to get a better understanding of the "scene".

The first official engagement at the Five Spot was Cecil Taylor, whose band featured Buell Neidlinger on bass and Denis Charles on drums. Later, Steve Lacy (then known as Steve Lackritz) was added to the band. Originally, Taylor's band was initially hired to accompany Dick Whitmore, but Whitmore quit after three nights, giving the job to Taylor. The booking lasted from November 29, 1956, to January 3, 1957.

Not long afterward, Charles "Big Charlie" Turyn, a Holocaust survivor, began bartending and waiting tables at the club, and became another fixture, a walking repository of information about the music of the era and the club.

On July 18, 1957, Thelonious Monk's quartet began a six-month residency at the club. The group featured John Coltrane on tenor saxophone, Wilbur Ware on bass, and Shadow Wilson on drums. It was Monk's first engagement in New York City following a long suspension of his cabaret card, a problem which was resolved with assistance from the Terminis. Monk had another extended booking at the club a year later, this time with Coltrane replaced by Johnny Griffin, Ware by Ahmed Abdul-Malik, and Wilson by Roy Haynes. That group was recorded and issued on the albums Thelonious in Action and Misterioso (both 1958).

On November 17, 1959, the Ornette Coleman Quartet from Los Angeles made its New York debut at the Five Spot. The Quartet featured Coleman on alto saxophone, Don Cherry on cornet, Charlie Haden on bass, and Billy Higgins on drums. The engagement was originally scheduled to last two weeks, but due to its success was extended to ten weeks, ending in late January 1960. Musicians such as Leonard Bernstein, Miles Davis, and John Coltrane were among the attendees on the opening night. On April 5, 1960, the quartet returned to the Five Spot for a second engagement which lasted four months ending in late October 1960. This second engagement featured Ed Blackwell on drums instead of Higgins.

The original Café was demolished in 1962 to make way for senior housing and the club moved to nearby 2 St. Marks Place. That location discontinued live music in 1967 and the brothers let their cabaret license lapse as live jazz dipped in popularity. It resumed jazz performances in 1974, having briefly changed its name to the Two Saints, but it closed in January 1976, having hosted final performances in 1975, because it was never able to regain a cabaret license.

== Live recordings ==
- 1957: Phil Woods, Frank Socolow, Cecil Payne – Bird's Night (Savoy)
- 1958: Pepper Adams – 10 to 4 at the 5 Spot (Riverside)
- 1958: Thelonious Monk – Thelonious in Action (Riverside)
- 1958: Thelonious Monk – Misterioso (Riverside)
- 1959: Randy Weston – Live at the Five Spot (United Artists)
- 1959: Kenny Burrell – On View at the Five Spot Cafe (Blue Note)
- 1960: Jimmy Giuffre – The Jimmy Giuffre Quartet in Person (Verve)
- 1960: George Russell – George Russell Sextet at the Five Spot (Decca)
- 1961: Eric Dolphy – At the Five Spot (Prestige)
- 1961: Eric Dolphy – Memorial Album (Prestige/New Jazz)
- 1966: Charles McPherson – The Quintet/Live! (Prestige)

== See also ==
- List of jazz venues
- The Tin Palace
- Tier 3
- Café Bohemia
- Slugs' Saloon
- Soundscape
