= Jazz poet =

Jazz poet may refer to:

- Jazz Poet, a 1989 album by Tommy Flanagan
- Jazz poetry, a form of poetry
