= Critics' Choice (album) =

Studio album by Pepper Adams
- Released: 1958
- Recorded: August 23, 1957
- Studios: Los Angeles, CA
- Genre: Jazz
- Length: 45:44
- Labels: World Pacific; PJM-407
- Producer: Richard Bock

Pepper Adams chronology
| Pepper Adams Quintet (1957) | Critics' Choice (1958) | The Cool Sound of Pepper Adams (1957) |

Critics' Choice is an album led by baritone saxophonist Pepper Adams which was recorded in 1957 and originally released on the World Pacific label.

== Reception ==
Professional ratings
Review scores
| Source | Rating |
|---|---|
| Allmusic | 4/5 stars |
| Disc | 4/5 stars |
| The Penguin Guide to Jazz | 3/4 stars |

The Allmusic review by Scott Yanow states "During a time when Gerry Mulligan's cool-toned baritone was very influential, Adams rose to prominence with a harder and bigger sound, much more hard bop than cool. This relatively obscure release, originally an LP for the World Pacific label, finds the baritonist in Los Angeles matching his hard-driving style with several players identified with West Coast cool jazz. ... Adams was one of the most consistent of all jazzmen; he never seemed to make an unworthy record, so he is in typically fine form throughout this freewheeling hard bop set". The Penguin Guide to Jazz stated that the album was named for Adams' DownBeat poll win, and described it as "quite light in tone and approach".

== Track listing ==
All compositions by Pepper Adams except where noted.

1. "Minor Mishap" (Tommy Flanagan) – 6:28
2. "Blackout Blues" – 4:58
3. "High Step" (Barry Harris) – 8:44
4. "Zec" (Thad Jones) – 6:35
5. "Alone Together" (Arthur Schwartz, Howard Dietz) – 5:51
6. "50-21" (Jones) – 8:12
7. "Four Funky Folk" 4:59 – Bonus track on CD reissue

== Personnel ==
- Pepper Adams – baritone saxophone
- Lee Katzman – trumpet (tracks 1 & 3–6)
- Jimmy Rowles – piano
- Doug Watkins – bass
- Mel Lewis – drums
