= Straight Flight =

Studio album by John Abercrombie
- Released: 1979
- Recorded: March 19 and 20, 1979
- Studios: Sage and Sound Studios, Los Angeles
- Genre: Jazz
- Length: 38:47
- Label: JAM
- Producer: Lew Tabackin

John Abercrombie chronology
Arcade (1979)	Straight Flight (1979)	Abercrombie Quartet (1980)

Professional ratings
Review scores
Source	Rating
AllMusic	4/5 stars

Straight Flight is a studio album by American jazz guitarist John Abercrombie that was released by Jam in 1979.

== Reception ==
Ken Dryden of Allmusic wrote "John Abercrombie is joined by fellow Berklee alumni George Mraz on bass and drummer Peter Donald for a rare session focusing exclusively on standards and classic jazz compositions. Abercrombie, who has one of the most distinctive approaches to the electric guitar, gives Dave Brubeck's "In Your Own Sweet Way" an intense workout while barely touching on the melody itself. The intimate "My Foolish Heart" is also rather abstract and played very softly, with the primary focus on Mraz. The leader switches to electric mandolin for a breakneck-tempo dash through John Coltrane's "Bessie's Blues," which opens with a furious solo by Donald, while Abercrombie focuses on the upper range of his instrument. "There Is No Greater Love" is relatively straightforward, though the theme never fully emerges until nearly the end of the piece. The brisk reading of "Beautiful Love" is the most accessible track to those not already familiar with Abercrombie's playing. Finally, a sensational interpretation of Miles Davis' landmark modal piece "Nardis" begins with Mraz's haunting arco bass, backed by the leader's floating guitar and Donald's sparse percussion, then a brief drum solo signals the beginning of an intense workout by the trio. Recorded for the Japanese label Discomate and briefly available as a JAM LP, this 1979 release is long out of print."

== Track listing ==
No.	Title	Writer(s)	Length
1.	"In Your Own Sweet Way"	Dave Brubeck	7:01
2.	"My Foolish Heart"	Victor Young	7:20
3.	"Bessie's Blues"	John Coltrane	4:45
4.	"There Is No Greater Love"	Isham Jones, Marty Symes	6:42
5.	"Beautiful Love"	Wayne King, Victor Young, Egbert Van Alstyne	6:15
6.	"Nardis"	Miles Davis	6:44
Total length:			38:47

== Personnel ==
- John Abercrombie – electric guitar
- George Mraz – bass
- Peter Donald – drums
- Lew Tabackin – producer
