= Reflectory (album) =

Studio album by Pepper Adams
- Released: 1978
- Recorded: June 14, 1978
- Studio: CI Recording, NYC
- Genre: Jazz
- Length: 39:29
- Label: Muse; MR 5182
- Producer: Mitch Farber

Pepper Adams chronology
Baritone Madness (1977)	Reflectory (1978)	Be-Bop? (1979)

Reflectory is an album by baritone saxophonist Pepper Adams, recorded in 1978 and released on the Muse label. It was nominated for a Grammy Award, for "Best Jazz Instrumental Performance, Soloist".

== Reception ==
Professional ratings
Review scores
Source	Rating
AllMusic	3.5/5 stars
DownBeat	4/5 stars
The Rolling Stone Jazz Record Guide	5/5 stars

The AllMusic review by Ken Dryden states: "Adams' approach to the baritone sax is sometimes a bit more aggressive and less melodic than Gerry Mulligan, which results in occasional inadvertent reed squeaks in his tricky opener, 'Reflectory'. Better is the outspoken yet still lovely treatment of Duke Ellington's 'Sophisticated Lady'. The most surprising track is his rapid-fire arrangement of the ballad 'That's All', in which Hanna takes top solo honors. This recommended album is worth acquiring."

DownBeat reviewer Fred Bouchard wrote that "left to his own devices, Pepper writes and plays to the very bottom of baritone soul".

== Track listing ==
All compositions by Pepper Adams, except where noted.

1. "Refelectory" – 7:00
2. "Sophisticated Lady" (Duke Ellington) – 5:37
3. "Etude Diablolique" – 7:16
4. "Claudette's Way" – 6:11
5. "I Carry Your Heart" – 6:53
6. "That's All" (Alan Brandt, Bob Haymes) – 6:32

== Personnel ==
- Pepper Adams – baritone saxophone
- Roland Hanna – piano
- George Mraz – bass
- Billy Hart – drums
