= Live at Maybeck Recital Hall, Volume Four =

Live album by Walter Norris
- Recorded: 1990
- Venue: Maybeck Recital Hall, Berkeley, California, U.S.
- Genre: Jazz
- Label: Concord

Live at Maybeck Recital Hall, Volume Four is an album of solo performances by jazz pianist Walter Norris, recorded in 1990.

== Overview ==
Professional ratings
Review scores
| Source | Rating |
|---|---|
| AllMusic | 4.5/5 stars |

The album was recorded in 1990 at the Maybeck Recital Hall in Berkeley, California. "Scrambled" is "a radical reworking of 'I Got Rhythm'". It was released by Concord Records. The AllMusic reviewer concluded: "His 1990 solo set at Maybeck Recital Hall is a perfect place to begin exploring Walter Norris' music." Pianist Liam Noble described Norris's performance of "'Round Midnight": "the tune eases in and out of extended and orthodox harmonies, letting the turn of phrase carry the weight. At nine and a half minutes, Norris takes his time, improvising in slow undulations rather than opting for the burn up, some truly Rachmaninoff-esque flourishes almost threatening to abandon the form before returning eventually to it."

== Track listing ==
1. "The Song Is You"
2. "'Round Midnight"
3. "Waltz for Walt"
4. "The Best Thing for You"
5. "Darn That Dream"
6. "Scrambled"
7. "Modus Vivendi"
8. "It's Always Spring"
9. "Body and Soul"

== Personnel ==
- Walter Norris – piano
