= Generations (Pepper Adams and Frank Foster album) =

Studio album by Pepper Adams and Frank Foster
- Released: 1985
- Recorded: January 25, 1985
- Studio: Van Gelder Studio, Englewood Cliffs, NJ
- Genre: Jazz
- Label: Muse MR 5313
- Producer: James L. Dean

Pepper Adams chronology
Conjuration: Fat Tuesday's Session (1983)	Generations (1985)	The Adams Effect (1985)

Frank Foster chronology
Frankly Speaking (1984)	Generations (1985)	The Count Basie Orchestra Directed by Frank Foster Live at El Morocco (1992)

Generations is an album by saxophonists Pepper Adams and Frank Foster which was recorded and released on the Muse label in 1985.

== Reception ==
Professional ratings
Review scores
Source	Rating
Allmusic	2.5/5 stars

The Allmusic review states "Baritonist Pepper Adams gets first billing on this record but he is actually only on four of the seven cuts. James L. Dean (who is heard on tenor, alto and clarinet) organized the session and it is largely his date despite the presence of Adams, tenor-saxophonist Frank Foster and a fine (if obscure) rhythm section. ... Overall the modern hard bop music is quite successful, but this album should have come out under Dean's name.".

== Track listing ==
All compositions by James L. Dean except where noted

1. "Generations" – 7:42
2. "Dance of Infidels" (Bud Powell) – 10:49
3. "Stable Mates" (Benny Golson) – 5:15
4. "Titter Pipes" (Tommy Newsom) – 5:30
5. "Mood in Question" (Artie Shaw) – 4:20
6. "Milestones" (Miles Davis) – 5:30
7. "Inventory" – 5:45

== Personnel ==
- Pepper Adams – baritone saxophone (tracks 1–4)
- Frank Foster – tenor saxophone, soprano saxophone (tracks 1–3, 6 & 7)
- James L. Dean – tenor saxophone, alto saxophone, clarinet
- Vinnie Cutro – trumpet (track 1)
- Noreen Grey – piano
- Earl Sauls – bass (tracks 1–4, 6 & 7)
- Glenn Davis – drums (tracks 1–4, 6 & 7)
