= Characters (John Abercrombie album) =

Studio album by John Abercrombie
- Released: May 1978
- Recorded: November 1977
- Studio: Talent Studios; Oslo, Norway
- Genre: Jazz
- Length: 44:54
- Label: ECM 1117
- Producer: Manfred Eicher

John Abercrombie chronology
Sargasso Sea (1976)	Characters (1978)	Arcade (1979)

Characters is a solo album by guitarist John Abercrombie, recorded in May 1977 and released on ECM Records in May of the following year.

== Reception ==
Professional ratings
Review scores
Source	Rating
AllMusic	4/5 stars
The Penguin Guide to Jazz	3.5/4 stars
The Rolling Stone Jazz Record Guide	4/5 stars

The AllMusic review by Robert Taylor stated: "Abercrombie makes excellent use of space within both his compositions and solos. Upon the first listen there may not appear to be very much here; however, this music needs to be absorbed over several listens to appreciate Abercrombie's brilliance."

The Penguin Guide to Jazz gave the album 3½ stars, stating, "Characters was Abercrombie's most overt manifesto and calling-card, a demonstration of styles and moods and, even at this point in his career, influences too."

The Rolling Stone Jazz Record Guide called the album "a tremendous solo display of Abercrombie's acoustic/electric guitar and mandolin playing."

== Track listing ==
All tracks are written by John Abercrombie.

No.	Title	Length
1.	"Parable"	10:40
2.	"Memoir"	3:13
3.	"Telegram"	4:35
4.	"Backward Glance"	4:37
5.	"Ghost Dance"	7:01
6.	"Paramour"	3:51
7.	"After Thoughts"	3:22
8.	"Evensong"	7:35

== Personnel ==
- John Abercrombie – electric guitar, acoustic guitar, electric mandolin
