= Twelfth & Pingree =

Live album by Pepper Adams
- Released: 1976
- Recorded: August 13, 1975
- Venue: The Domicile, Munich, West Germany
- Genre: Jazz
- Length: 38:14
- Label: Enja; 2074
- Producer: Horst Weber and Matthias Winckelmann

Pepper Adams chronology
Julian (1973)	Twelfth & Pingree (1976)	Baritone Madness (1977)

Twelfth & Pingree, is a live album by baritone saxophonist Pepper Adams which was recorded in Munich in 1975 and originally released on the Enja label.

== Track listing ==
All compositions by Pepper Adams except where noted.

1. "Twelfth & Pingree" – 9:45
2. "A Child Is Born" (Thad Jones) – 8:26
3. "Well, You Needn't" (Thelonious Monk) – 9:27
4. "Bossa Nouveau" – 9:36

== Personnel ==
- Pepper Adams – baritone saxophone
- Walter Norris – piano
- George Mraz – bass
- Makaya Ntshoko – drums
