= The Master (Pepper Adams album) =

1980 studio album by Pepper Adams

The Master...

Studio album by Pepper Adams
- Released: 1980
- Recorded: March 11, 1980
- Studio: Downtown Sound Studio, NYC
- Genre: Jazz
- Length: 42:31
- Label: Muse; MR 5213
- Producer: Mitch Farber

Pepper Adams chronology
Be-Bop? (1979)	The Master... (1980)	Urban Dreams (1989)

The Master..., is an album by baritone saxophonist Pepper Adams, recorded in 1980 and released on the Muse label.

== Reception ==
Professional ratings
Review scores
Source	Rating
AllMusic	3.5/5 stars
The Rolling Stone Jazz Record Guide	4/5 stars

The AllMusic review by Ken Dryden states: "This 1980 studio date with Tommy Flanagan, George Mraz, and Leroy Williams is a stimulating outing, dominated by the leader's originals".

== Track listing ==
All compositions by Pepper Adams except where noted.

1. "Enchilada Baby" – 5:41
2. "Chelsea Bridge" (Billy Strayhorn) – 8:58
3. "Bossallegro" – 6:03
4. "Rue Serpente" – 8:10
5. "Lovers of Their Time" – 6:07
6. "My Shining Hour" (Harold Arlen, Johnny Mercer) – 7:32

== Personnel ==
- Pepper Adams – baritone saxophone
- Tommy Flanagan – piano
- George Mraz – bass
- Leroy Williams – drums
