= The Cat Walk =

Studio album by Donald Byrd
- Released: February 1962
- Recorded: May 2, 1961
- Studio: Van Gelder Studio, Englewood Cliffs
- Genre: Jazz
- Length: 40:41
- Label: Blue Note; BLP 4075; BST 84075
- Producer: Alfred Lion

Donald Byrd chronology
Chant (1961)	The Cat Walk (1962)	Royal Flush (1961)

The Cat Walk is an album by American trumpeter Donald Byrd recorded in 1961 and released on the Blue Note label in 1962 as BLP 4075.

== Reception ==
The Allmusic review by Steve Leggett awarded the album 4 stars and stated "Trumpeter Donald Byrd and baritone saxophonist Pepper Adams worked together on several recordings between 1958 and 1961, and The Cat Walk is among the best... Byrd's playing throughout is typically sleek and lyrical, and Adams' sturdy, husky baritone sound is the perfect counterbalance, making The Cat Walk an essential Byrd purchase".

Professional ratings
Review scores
Source	Rating
Allmusic	4/5 stars
The Rolling Stone Jazz Record Guide	3/5 stars

== Track listing ==
All compositions by Donald Byrd except as indicated

1. "Say You're Mine" (Duke Pearson) - 7:21
2. "Duke's Mixture" (Pearson) - 7:05
3. "Each Time I Think of You" (Byrd, Pearson) - 5:39
4. "The Cat Walk" - 6:46
5. "Cute" (Neal Hefti) - 6:21
6. "Hello Bright Sunflower" (Pearson) - 7:29

== Personnel ==
- Donald Byrd - trumpet
- Pepper Adams - baritone saxophone
- Duke Pearson - piano
- Laymon Jackson - bass
- Philly Joe Jones - drums

== Charts ==
Chart performance for The Cat Walk
Chart (2026)	Peak position
UK Jazz & Blues Albums (OCC)	18
