= Misterioso (Thelonious Monk album) =

Live album by Thelonious Monk Quartet
- Released: December 1958
- Recorded: August 7, 1958
- Venue: Five Spot Café (New York)
- Genre: Hard bop
- Length: 47:08
- Label: Riverside
- Producer: Orrin Keepnews

Thelonious Monk albums chronology
Thelonious in Action (1958)	Misterioso (1958)	The Thelonious Monk Orchestra at Town Hall (1959)

Misterioso is a 1958 live album by the American jazz ensemble the Thelonious Monk Quartet. By the time of its recording, the pianist and bandleader Thelonious Monk had overcome an extended period of career difficulties and achieved stardom with his residency at New York's Five Spot Café, beginning in 1957. He returned there the following year for a second stint with his quartet, featuring drummer Roy Haynes, bassist Ahmed Abdul-Malik, and tenor saxophonist Johnny Griffin. Along with Thelonious in Action (1958), Misterioso captures portions of the ensemble's August 7 show at the venue.

One of the first successful live recordings of Monk's music, Misterioso was produced by Orrin Keepnews of Riverside Records. According to Keepnews, the pianist played more distinctly here than on his studio albums in response to the audience's enthusiasm during the performance. Misterioso's title was meant to evoke Monk's reputation as an enigmatic, challenging performer, while its cover art was part of Riverside's attempt to capitalize on his popularity with intellectual and bohemian audiences; it appropriated Giorgio de Chirico's 1915 painting The Seer.

Misterioso was originally met with a mixed critical reaction; reviewers applauded Monk's performance but were critical of Griffin, whose playing they felt was out of place with the quartet. The album was remastered and reissued in 1989 and 2012 by Original Jazz Classics, and has since received retrospective acclaim, with some viewing Griffin's playing as the record's highlight. The saxophonist's solo during the performance of "In Walked Bud" in particular has developed renown among critics and jazz musicians.

== Background ==
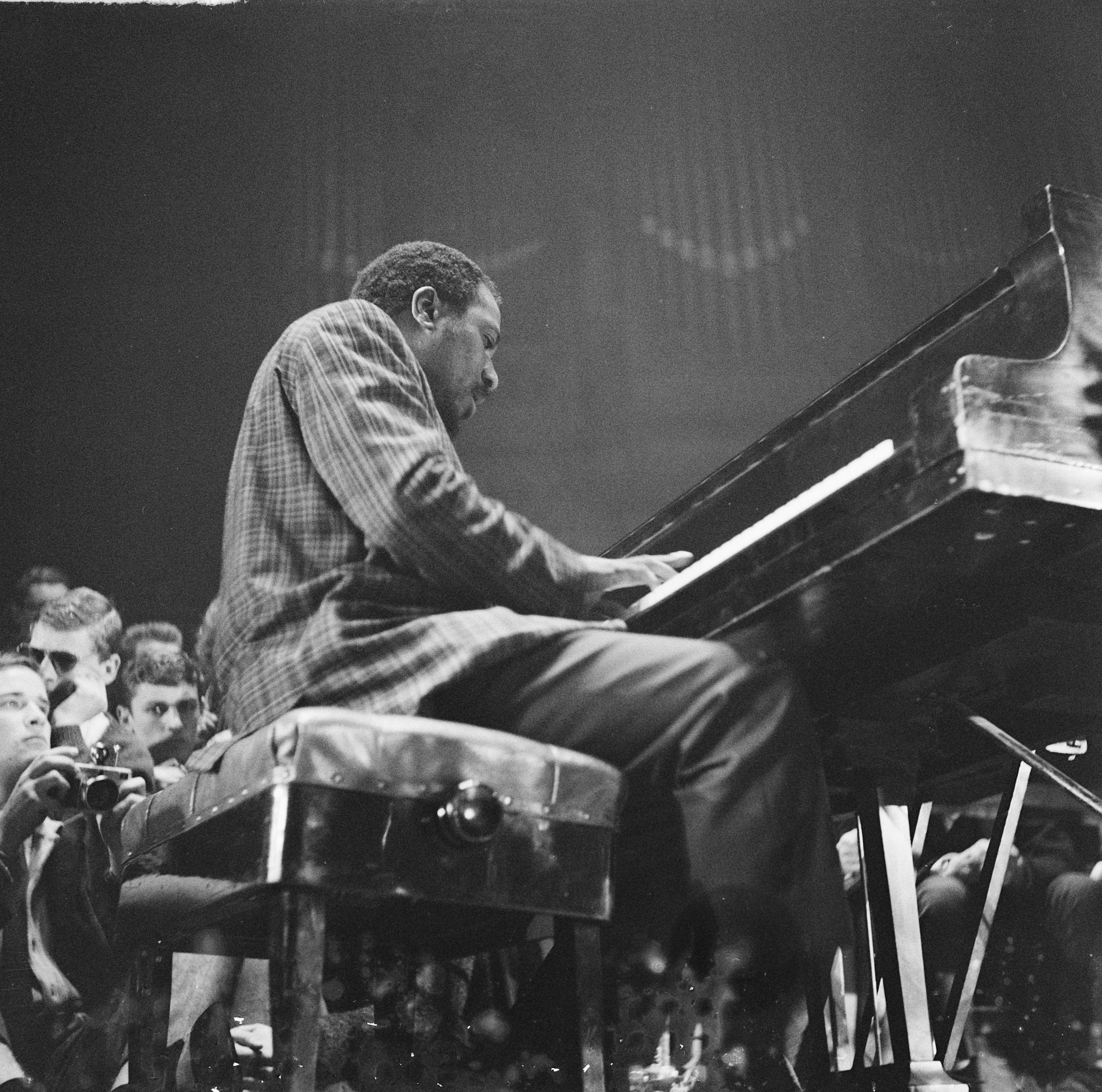
Thelonious Monk in 1961

In 1951, Thelonious Monk was convicted of narcotics possession after refusing to betray his friend, pianist Bud Powell, to the police; a police search of the car belonging to Powell's female companion had discovered his glassine envelope of heroin lying beside Monk's feet. The conviction resulted in the suspension of Monk's cabaret card, the permit required by performers in New York for work in nightclubs. Although the loss limited him professionally, he recorded several albums of original music and received positive press during the 1950s. Monk's manager, Harry Colomby, led an appeal on the pianist's behalf in front of the State Liquor Authority (SLA) to have his card restored. Colomby argued to the SLA that Monk was "a drug-free, law-abiding citizen, whose productivity and growing popularity as a recording artist demonstrates his standing as a responsible working musician".

In May 1957, the SLA said Monk needed to get a club owner to hire him first, prompting Colomby to consider the Five Spot Café in New York City's East Village. "I wanted to find a place that was small", he later said. "I once drove past this place in the Village and there was a bar and I heard music ... A place where poets hung out." Joe Termini, who co-owned the venue with his brother Iggy, testified at Monk's police hearing, which resulted in the reinstatement of his cabaret card and his employment at the Five Spot Café. In his first stable job in years, Monk helped transform the small bar into one of the city's most popular venues, as it attracted bohemians, hipsters, and devout fans of the pianist's music. With the residency, he had finally found jazz stardom after twenty years of career struggles and obscurity.

Monk began his first stint at the venue in July 1957, with saxophonist John Coltrane, bassist Ahmed Abdul-Malik, and drummer Shadow Wilson in his group. However, by the time it ended in December, he had lost Wilson to poor health, while Coltrane left in pursuit of a solo career and a return to Miles Davis's group. Monk returned to New York's club scene in 1958 with a new quartet and received an eight-week offer from Joe and Iggy Termini to play the venue again, beginning on June 12. He played most nights during the weekend to capacity crowds with Abdul-Malik, drummer Roy Haynes, and tenor saxophonist Johnny Griffin, who had performed with Monk before. Griffin was unfamiliar with all of his repertoire and, like Coltrane, found it difficult to solo over Monk's comping during their first few weeks. During their performances, Monk often left the stage for a drink at the bar or danced around, which gave Griffin an opportunity to play with more space. However, the quartet eventually developed a sufficient rapport and grasp of the set list.

== Recording ==
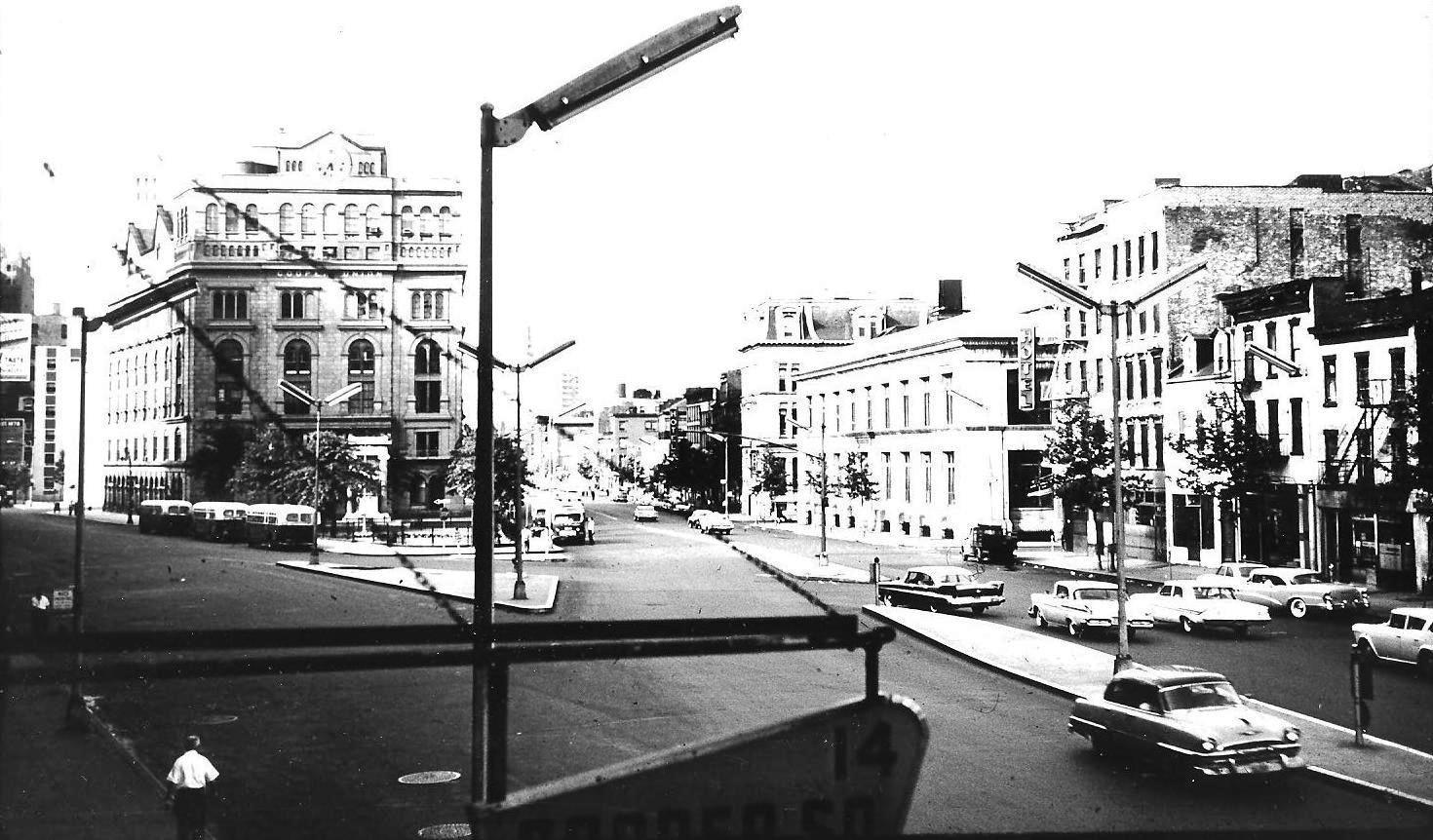
The Five Spot Café was located in New York City's Cooper Square (1957).

Orrin Keepnews attempted to record the quartet live at the Five Spot Café on two different occasions in 1958 for his label, Riverside Records. His first recording of the ensemble was of two sets during their July 9 show. Monk was disappointed with the recording and did not allow Riverside to release it, although it was released years later after his death.

Keepnews returned to the venue on August 7 when Monk performed an evening show in the club's overcrowded room, which the producer had set up with recording equipment. It yielded both Misterioso and Thelonious in Action; the latter was released first in 1958. The show was believed to be the first successful live recording of Monk's music, until the recording of his 1957 concert with Coltrane at Carnegie Hall was discovered and released in 2005. The two live albums from the Five Spot Café are the only recordings that document Monk's time with Griffin.

== Composition and performance ==
According to jazz critic Gary Giddins, Misterioso is a hard bop record. The compositions performed for the album were arranged by Monk, who reworked four of his earlier compositions. In the album's liner notes, Keepnews wrote of Monk's approach to arrangements: "It should be axiomatic that Monk is a constantly self-renewing composer-arranger-musician, that each new recording of an 'old' number, particularly with different personnel, represents a fresh view of it—almost a new composition." In the producer's opinion, Monk played the piano more vividly and less introspectively than on his studio recordings in response to the enthusiastic crowds he drew nightly to the venue.

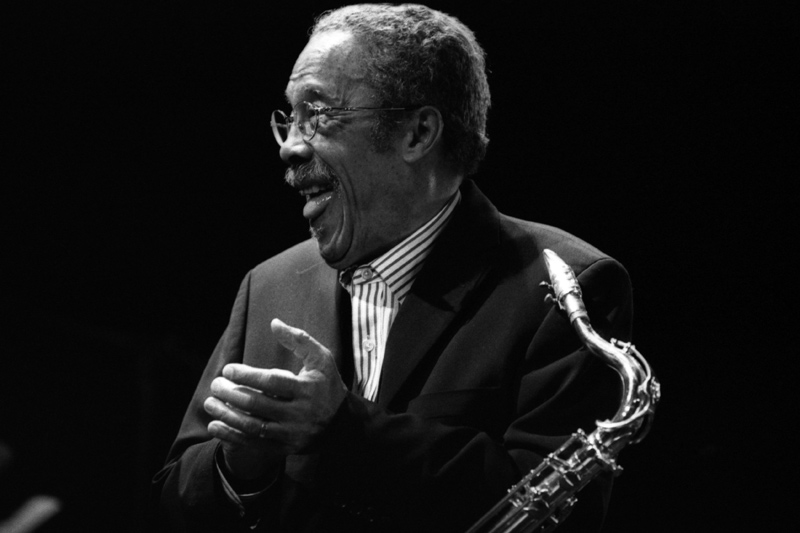
Johnny Griffin in 2007

On "Nutty", Griffin incorporated lines from "The Surrey with the Fringe on Top" and exhibited a frenetic swing that was complemented by counterplay from Haynes and Monk. "Blues Five Spot", a new composition by Monk for the album, is a twelve-bar blues homage to the Five Spot Café and featured solos from each player. Griffin and Monk transfigured chord structures and melodies throughout the performance. Griffin's solo vamp maintained the rhythm while quoting lines from other pieces, including the theme song for the animated Popeye theatrical shorts; he played "The Sailor's Hornpipe" at the end of "Blues Five Spot".

"In Walked Bud"
Monk resumed his piano playing after Griffin's fast-to-moderate saxophone solo during "In Walked Bud", a piece dedicated to Bud Powell.

The quartet began "In Walked Bud" with an eight-bar piano intro and thirty-two-bar form. Griffin began his solo a minute into the performance with saxophone wails. In the third minute, Monk did not play, while Griffin played fast phrases at the top of his register with intermittently slower R&B and free jazz elements. Monk shouted approvingly throughout Griffin's solo before he resumed piano and played a two-minute theme. "Just a Gigolo", a standard, was the only track on the album not composed by Monk, who performed it in a brief, unaccompanied version. It was played as a single chorus repeated at length.

The title track—first recorded for Blue Note Records in 1948 with vibraphonist Milt Jackson—is one of Monk's most influential recordings and is based on a series of major and minor sixths. His performance of "Misterioso" at the Five Spot Café showcased his idiosyncratic playing of one blue note next to another. Monk superimposed musical ideas that deviated from the composition's original tonal center, adding a C blue note to the D-flat blue note. Haynes' subdued drumming backed Griffin's aggressive bop playing and extended solo on "Misterioso".

== Title and packaging ==
The Seer by Giorgio de Chirico, 1914–15, oil on canvas, Museum of Modern Art, New York

According to Keepnews, the album and its title track were named as a slight play on the words "mist" and "mystery", meant to evoke the perception of Monk's music as enigmatic and challenging at the time. Jazz critic Neil Tesser said that the word, which is Latin for "in a mysterious manner", was "used most often as a musical direction in classical music scores. But by the time Monk's quartet recorded this music [in 1958] 'Misterioso' had largely come to identify Monk himself."

To capitalize on Monk's popularity with intellectual and bohemian fans from venues such as the Five Spot Café, Riverside released Misterioso and reissues of his older records with designs that appropriated 20th century works of art. The album's cover art is a reproduction of Giorgio de Chirico's 1915 painting The Seer, which was originally painted as a tribute to French poet Arthur Rimbaud.

According to Monk biographer Robin Kelley, Rimbaud had "called on the artist to be a seer in order to plumb the depths of the unconscious in the quest for clairvoyance". This led Kelley to believe the painting was the best choice for the album cover. "The one-eyed figure represented the visionary", he explained. "The architectural forms and the placement of the chalkboard evoked the unity of art and science—a perfect symbol for an artist whose music has been called 'mathematical.'" In the opinion of musicologist Robert G. O'Meally, the cover reflected "the mysterious violations of convention of perspective, the silences, and oddly attractive angles (the overall futuristic quality) in Monk's music".

== Release and reception ==
Misterioso was released on LP in December 1958 by Riverside and was Monk's eighth album for the label. The following March, Monk was voted pianist of the year in an annual poll of international jazz critics from DownBeat, which said he was heard "at his challenging, consistently creative best" on Misterioso. Jazz critic Nat Hentoff appraised the record that May for Hi Fi Review, in which he said it was not one of the pianist's best albums. He observed "too little space for Monk's soloing and somewhat too much" for Griffin, whose saxophone cry and timing were more impressive than his solos. Hentoff also believed Haynes and Abdul-Malik did not support Monk as creatively as Wilbur Ware and Art Blakey had on his previous Riverside albums, where he said Monk was in more compelling form. When Misterioso was released in 1964 in the United Kingdom, Charles Fox gave it a positive review in Gramophone. He found its music on-par with Monk's usual standards and highlighted by exceptional playing by him and the rhythm section, particularly Haynes, who showed "once again what a great drummer he was then—and, indeed, still is today". However, Fox felt that Griffin did not fit in with the quartet and overshadowed Monk's compositions, finding the saxophonist's solos diffuse and characterized by trivial quotations rather than musical development.

Retrospective professional reviews
Review scores
Source	Rating
All Music Guide to Jazz	5/5 stars
The Encyclopedia of Popular Music	4/5 stars
MusicHound Jazz	5/5 stars
The Penguin Guide to Jazz	3.5/4 stars
PopMatters	9/10
The Rolling Stone Album Guide	5/5 stars

In the All Music Guide to Jazz (2002), Lindsay Planer wrote that Monk's quartet "continually reinvented" their strong, cohesive sound with "overwhelming and instinctual capacities" throughout Misterioso. He especially praised Griffin, saying the saxophonist "consistently liberated the performances". Monk biographer Robin Kelley felt that because Griffin had mastered Monk's compositions at that point, his solos on Misterioso and Thelonious in Action were excursive and spirited. Jazz critic Scott Yanow found Misterioso to be the superior record between the two because of what he said was Griffin's unforgettable solo on a passionate rendition of "In Walked Bud", while music historian Ted Gioia listed Monk and Griffin's "freewheeling" performance on the title track as one of his recommended recordings of the composition. According to Robert Christgau, both this record and Brilliant Corners (1957) represented Monk's artistic peak. He cited Misterioso as his favorite album and, in a 2009 article for The Barnes & Noble Review, wrote that Griffin's tenor solo during "In Walked Bud" remained his "favorite five minutes of recorded music". Liam McManus from PopMatters was less enthusiastic about Griffin's playing, which he believed was occasionally heavy-handed and detracted from the music, but still recommended Misterioso as an exceptional Monk record featuring the pianist in a casual performance with his quartet.

I've recently learned [that the Johnny Griffin solo on 'In Walked Bud'] is more legendary than I'd dreamed—there are jazz musicians who've committed it to memory, I'm told.

— Robert Christgau (2019)

In 1989, Misterioso was digitally remastered by mastering engineer Joe Tarantino for the album's CD reissue. Tarantino used 20-bit K2 Super Coding System technology at Fantasy Studios in Berkeley, California. On May 15, 2012, Concord Music Group reissued the album as part of the company's Original Jazz Classics Remasters series, along with Jazz at Massey Hall (1953) and Bill Evans' 1962 record Moon Beams. The re-release featured 24-bit remastering by Tarantino and three bonus tracks, including a medley of "Bye-Ya" and "Epistrophy" performed with drummer Art Blakey. Concord vice president Nick Phillips, who produced the reissue series, said Misterioso was "an all-time classic live Thelonious Monk record" and "an indelible snapshot of Monk live in the late '50s." McManus said that as with most reissues of jazz albums, the bonus tracks on Misterioso were valuable and showcased uninhibited performances of Monk's past compositions.

== Track listing ==
All compositions are by Thelonious Monk, except where noted.

Side one

1. "Nutty" – 5:22
2. "Blues Five Spot" – 8:11
3. "Let's Cool One" – 9:16

Side two

1. "In Walked Bud" – 11:20
2. "Just a Gigolo" (Irving Caesar and Leonello Casucci) – 2:07
3. "Misterioso" – 10:52

1989 CD bonus tracks

Sides one and two were combined as tracks 1–6, with the following additional tracks:

7. "'Round Midnight" – 6:15
8. "Evidence" – 10:14

2012 CD bonus track

1. "Bye-Ya" / "Epistrophy (Theme)" – 11:54

== Personnel ==
1958 LP

- Thelonious Monk – piano
- Johnny Griffin – tenor saxophone
- Ahmed Abdul-Malik – bass
- Roy Haynes – drums
- Ray Fowler – engineering
- Orrin Keepnews – liner notes, production
- Paul Bacon – cover design
- Giorgio de Chirico – cover painting

2012 reissue

- Art Blakey – drums (track 9)
- Nick Phillips – reissue production
- Joe Tarantino – digital remastering (1989)
- Abbey Anna – project assistance
- Chris Clough – project assistance
- Michelle Tremblay – project assistance
- Neil Tesser – liner notes
- Andrew Pham – design

== Release history ==
Region	Date	Label	Format	Catalog
United States	1958	Riverside Records	stereo LP	RLP 1133
United States	1958	Riverside Records	mono LP	RLP 12–279
United Kingdom	1964	Riverside Records	mono LP	RLP 279
United States	April 7, 1989	Original Jazz Classics	CD	OJCCD-206-25
United States	May 15, 2012	Original Jazz Classics, Concord Music Group	CD	OJC-33725-02

== See also ==
- 1950s in jazz
- Thelonious Monk discography

== Bibliography ==
- Anon. (December 25, 1958). "On Riverside" (PDF). DownBeat. 25 (26).
- Anon. (March 19, 1959). "Thelonious Monk". DownBeat. 26 (16).
- Anon. (1995). Original Jazz Classics Collector's Guide. Fantasy, Inc. ISBN 0963742132.
- Anon. (2001). Brilliant Corners: A Bio-discography of Thelonious Monk. Greenwood Publishing Group. ISBN 0313302391.
- Anon. (2012). "Original Jazz Classics Add Bill Evans, Thelonious Monk and the Quartet Titles". All About Jazz. Archived from the original on May 27, 2013.
- Anon.[b] (n.d.). "Thelonious Monk / Thelonious Quartet Monk – Misterioso CD Album". CD Universe. Muze. Archived from the original on January 17, 2016.
- Anon.[c] (n.d.). "Misterioso OJCCD 206 2 : Thelonious Monk Quartet". Concord Music Group. Archived from the original on March 10, 2014.
- Anon.[d] (n.d.). "Misterioso (Original Jazz Classics Remasters)". Concord Music Group. Archived from the original on October 31, 2013.
- Christgau, Robert (February 22, 2005). "Noise on Music Central". The Village Voice. Archived from the original on March 30, 2013.
- Cook, Richard; Morton, Brian (2006). The Penguin Guide to Jazz Recordings. Penguin Books.
- Christgau, Robert (2009). "Not So Misterioso". The Barnes & Noble Review. Archived from the original on May 11, 2013.
- Christgau, Robert (April 16, 2019). "Xgau Sez". robertchristgau.com. Archived from the original on April 20, 2019.
- Gioia, Ted (2012). The Jazz Standards: A Guide to the Repertoire. Oxford University Press. ISBN 978-0199937394.
- Fox, Charles (August 1964). "Jazz and Swing". Gramophone. 42.
- Giddins, Gary (September 20, 1976). "Two Labels Pull Out the Old Bottles". The Village Voice.
- Hentoff, Nat (May 1959). "Thelonious Monk Quartet – Misterioso". Hi Fi Review. 2.
- Holtje, Steve; Lee, Nancy Ann, eds. (1998). "Thelonious Monk". MusicHound Jazz: The Essential Album Guide. Music Sales Corporation. ISBN 0825672538.
- Keepnews, Orrin (1958). Misterioso (LP liner notes). Thelonious Monk Quartet. Riverside Records. RLP 1133.
- Kelley, Robin (2009). Thelonious Monk: The Life and Times of an American Original. Simon & Schuster. ISBN 978-1439190494.
- Larkin, Colin (2007). The Encyclopedia of Popular Music (4th ed.). Oxford University Press. ISBN 978-0195313734.
- McKnight, Terrance (2010). "Remembering Harlem's Finest: Bud Powell". WNYC News. Archived from the original on March 4, 2016.
- McManus, Liam (2012). "Thelonius Monk Quartet: Misterioso". PopMatters. Archived from the original on March 25, 2014.
- O'Meally, Robert G. (1997). "Jazz Albums as Art: Some Reflections". The International Review of African American Art. 14 (1). Hampton University Museum.
- Planer, Lindsay (2002). "Thelonious Monk: Misterioso". In Bogdanov, Vladimir; Woodstra, Chris; Erlewine, Stephen Thomas (eds.). All Music Guide to Jazz: The Definitive Guide to Jazz Music (4th ed.). Backbeat Books. ISBN 087930717X.
- Schuller, Gunther (November 1958). "Thelonious Monk". The Jazz Review.
- Siegel, Robert (2005). "Unearthing Unknown Monk, Coltrane Recording". NPR. Archived from the original on March 6, 2014.
- Swenson, John, ed. (1999). The Rolling Stone Jazz & Blues Album Guide. Random House.
- Tesser, Neil (2012). Misterioso (CD reissue liner notes). Thelonious Monk Quartet. Original Jazz Classics. OJC-33725-02.
- Yanow, Scott (2001). "Thelonious Monk: Misterioso". In Bogdanov, Vladimir; Woodstra, Chris; Erlewine, Stephen Thomas (eds.). All Music Guide: The Definitive Guide to Popular Music (4th ed.). Hal Leonard Corporation. ISBN 0879306270.
