= Encounter! =

Studio album by Pepper Adams
- Released: 1969
- Recorded: December 11–12, 1968
- Studio: Nola Sound Studios, New York City
- Genre: Jazz
- Length: 44:40
- Label: Prestige; PR 7677
- Producer: Fred Norsworthy and Otto Gust

Pepper Adams chronology
Mean What You Say (1966)	Encounter! (1969)	Ephemera (1973)

Encounter! is an album led by saxophonist Pepper Adams which was recorded in 1968 at Nola Penthouse Sound Studios, NYC, December 11–12, 1968 and released on the Prestige label in 1969.

== Reception ==
Professional ratings
Review scores
Source	Rating
Allmusic	4/5 stars
The Penguin Guide to Jazz	3.5/4 stars
The Rolling Stone Jazz Record Guide	4/5 stars

Allmusic awarded the album 4 stars stating "Baritonist Pepper Adams and tenor saxophonist Zoot Sims (who rarely performed together) make a surprisingly compatible team... The setting is more advanced than usual for Sims, who rises to the challenge". The Penguin Guide to Jazz commented that "Jones overdoes the bashing, and the uptempo pieces are a battle, but the horns don't falter at any point".

== Track listing ==
All compositions by Pepper Adams except where noted.

1. "Inanout" – 5:47
2. "The Star-Crossed Lovers" (Duke Ellington, Billy Strayhorn) – 3:54
3. "Cindy's Tune" – 5:58
4. "Serenity" (Joe Henderson) – 6:27
5. "Elusive" (Thad Jones) – 7:15
6. "I've Just Seen Her" (Lee Adams, Charles Strouse) – 7:17
7. "Punjab" (Henderson) – 4:05
8. "Verdandi" (Tommy Flanagan) – 3:57

== Personnel ==
- Pepper Adams – baritone saxophone
- Zoot Sims – tenor saxophone
- Tommy Flanagan – piano
- Ron Carter – bass
- Elvin Jones – drums
