= Julian (album) =

Live album by Pepper Adams
- Released: 1976
- Recorded: August 13, 1975
- Venues: The Domicile, Munich, West Germany
- Genre: Jazz
- Length: 60:47
- Labels: Enja; 2060
- Producers: Horst Weber and Matthias Winckelmann

Pepper Adams chronology
Ephemera (1973)	Julian (1976)	Twelfth & Pingree (1975)

Julian, is a live album by baritone saxophonist Pepper Adams which was recorded in Munich in 1975 and originally released on the Enja label.

== Reception ==
Professional ratings
Review scores
Source	Rating
Allmusic	4/5 stars
The Rolling Stone Jazz Record Guide	4/5 stars

The Allmusic review by Scott Yanow states "Recorded five days before Julian "Cannonball" Adderley's death, the title cut of this album was retitled and dedicated to the late altoist. The powerful baritonist Pepper Adams is well showcased ... in typically excellent form, playing intense solos that push but stay within the boundaries of hard bop". In JazzTimes, Miles Jordan wrote "The caliber of musicianship and the intricately worked-out tunes raise this performance far above a routine club gig". In Jazz Review, Lee Prosser stated "Julian is an example of mainstream jazz at its timeless best, helmed by a neglected master of one of The Big Horns".

== Track listing ==
All compositions by Pepper Adams except where noted.

1. "Jirge" – 9:00
2. "Julian" (George Mraz, Pepper Adams) – 7:13
3. "Spacemaker" (Walter Norris) – 6:01
4. "Ad Astra" – 7:41
5. "Three and One" (Thad Jones) – 10:21
6. "'Tis" (Jones) – 3:02
7. "Time on My Hands" (Vincent Youmans, Harold Adamson, Mack Gordon) – 10:24 Bonus track on CD reissue
8. "Lady Luck" (Jones) – 7:11 Bonus track on CD reissue

== Personnel ==
- Pepper Adams – baritone saxophone
- Walter Norris – piano
- George Mraz – bass
- Makaya Ntshoko – drums
