= Skippy Williams =

American jazz saxophonist and arranger (1916–1994)

- Born: Elmer (or Elbert) Williams; July 27, 1916
- Died: February 28, 1994 (aged 77)
- Genre: Jazz
- Occupations: Musician; arranger
- Instrument: Tenor saxophone
- Years active: 1939–1950s
- Formerly of: Earl Hines; Duke Ellington; Thelonious Monk

Elmer (or Elbert) "Skippy" Williams (July 27, 1916 – February 28, 1994) was an American jazz tenor saxophonist and arranger.

First credited as the arranger for some July 12, 1939, recordings for Earl Hines and His Orchestra, Williams is best remembered as the substitute for Ben Webster in Duke Ellington's orchestra. Replacing Webster in August 1943, Williams appears on Ellington's Carnegie Hall recordings in December 1943. He left Ellington in May 1944 to start his own band and was replaced by Al Sears.

In the mid-1940s, he gave tenor saxophone lessons to Pepper Adams in Rochester, New York, and was working with Thelonious Monk in 1946, credited as bandleader for Monk.

Williams also worked with Art Tatum, Fletcher Henderson, Count Basie, Lucky Millinder, Bob Chester, and, according to some sources, played tenor saxophone on the original recording of Bill Haley's "Rock Around the Clock" and "Shake, Rattle and Roll". This claim is, however, false.

== Filmography ==
- Mistaken Identity (1941)
