= The Cooker =

1958 album by US jazz trumpeter Lee Morgan

Studio album by Lee Morgan
- Released: January 1958
- Recorded: September 29, 1957
- Studio: Van Gelder Studio; Hackensack, NJ
- Genre: Hard bop
- Length: 38:51
- Label: Blue Note; BLP 1578
- Producer: Alfred Lion

Lee Morgan chronology
City Lights (1957)	The Cooker (1958)	Candy (1958)

The Cooker is a studio album by the American jazz trumpeter Lee Morgan. It was released through Blue Note Records in January 1958. The quintet features saxophonist Pepper Adams and rhythm section Bobby Timmons, Paul Chambers and Philly Joe Jones. The recording was made on September 29, 1957.

== Background ==
=== Recording and composition ===
Recorded and released while Morgan was still just nineteen years old, The Cooker is the first album to feature his own original compositions, as well as the first without any compositions written by Benny Golson.

=== Style ===
The Cooker is considered a demonstration of Morgan's early bebop virtuosity, with its frequent double time improvisational lines. It is also noted for performance trademarks which would later come to typify Morgan's style, such as clipped notes, upward slurs, half-valving, and triple-tonguing.

== Reception ==
Professional ratings
Review scores
Source	Rating
AllMusic	3.5/5 stars
The Rolling Stone Jazz Record Guide	4/5 stars

The AllMusic review by Scott Yanow states, "Morgan plays remarkably well for his age (already ranking just below Dizzy Gillespie and Miles Davis), making this an essential acquisition."

== Track listing ==
Side 1
No.	Title	Writer(s)	Length
1.	"A Night in Tunisia"	Dizzy Gillespie; Frank Paparelli	9:24
2.	"Heavy Dipper"	Morgan	7:05

Side 2
No.	Title	Writer(s)	Length
1.	"Just One of Those Things"	Cole Porter	7:18
2.	"Lover Man"	Jimmy Davis; Ram Ramirez; Sherman	6:50
3.	"New-Ma"	Morgan	8:14

CD bonus track
No.	Title	Writer(s)	Length
6.	"Just One of Those Things" (alternate take)	Porter	7:50

== Personnel ==
=== Musicians ===
- Lee Morgan – trumpet
- Pepper Adams – baritone saxophone
- Bobby Timmons – piano
- Paul Chambers – bass
- Philly Joe Jones – drums

=== Technical personnel ===
- Alfred Lion – producer
- Rudy Van Gelder – recording engineer, mastering
- Reid Miles – design
- Francis Wolff – photography
- Robert Levin – liner notes
