= Out of This World (Pepper Adams Donald Byrd Quintet album) =

Studio album by Pepper Adams Donald Byrd Quintet
- Released: 1961
- Recorded: March 2, 1961
- Genre: Jazz
- Label: Warwick; W 2041
- Producer: Teddy Charles

Pepper Adams chronology
Motor City Scene (1960)	Out of This World (1961)	Pepper Adams Plays the Compositions of Charlie Mingus (1963)

Donald Byrd chronology
Motor City Scene (1960)	Out of This World (1961)	Chant (1961)

Out of This World is an album by the Pepper Adams Donald Byrd Quintet. The album features the recording debut of pianist Herbie Hancock.

== Reception ==
Professional ratings
Review scores
Source	Rating
AllMusic	4/5 stars
DownBeat	4/5 stars
The Penguin Guide to Jazz Recordings	3/4 stars

The contemporaneous DownBeat reviewer, Leonard Feather, stated that the album was "the most successful Adams–Byrd collaboration to date", and described Hancock as "a capable and promising pianist".

== Track listing ==
Original issue, Warwick W 2041

1. "Out of This World" (Harold Arlen, Johnny Mercer)
2. "Curro's" (Donald Byrd)
3. "It's a Beautiful Evening" (Ray Rasch, Dotty Wayne)
4. "Mr. Lucky Theme" (Henry Mancini) (theme of TV-series Mr. Lucky)
5. "Bird House" (Donald Byrd)
6. "Day Dreams" (Duke Ellington, John Latouche, Billy Strayhorn)

Volume 2, Warwick W 2041-2

1. "I'm an Old Cowhand" (Johnny Mercer) (previously unreleased) 9:42
2. "Day Dreams"(alt. take) 4:50
3. "Out of This World" (alt. take) 3:55
4. "Mr. Lucky" (alt. take) 6:42
5. "Curro's" (alt. take) 6:40
6. "Byrd House" (alt. take) 5:50

2010 issue, Fresh Sound Records

1. "Byrd House" 10:52
2. "Mr. Lucky" 8:09
3. "Day Dreams" 5:10
4. "I'm an Old Cowhand" 9:44
5. "Curro's" 11:51
6. "It's a Beautiful Evening" 5:21
7. "Out of This World" 9:40

== Personnel ==
- Pepper Adams – baritone saxophone - ballad feature on "Day Dreams"
- Donald Byrd – trumpet
- Herbie Hancock – piano
- Laymon Jackson – double bass
- Jimmy Cobb – drums
- Teddy Charles - vibes on "It's a Beautiful Evening"

== Reissues ==
The recording sessions were reissued under various titles and leading artists, some even with changed track titles (false composer credits, missing names of bassist and drummer and the recording date). The first rereleases in the 1970s were probably the following on the American TCB label:

- Donald Byrd/Herbie Hancock – Takin' Care of Business (TCB LP 1002)
- Jammin' with Herbie Hancock (TCB LP 1006)
1. "T.C.B. with Herbie" = "Out of This World"
2. "Jammin' with Herbie" = "Curro's"
3. "Rock Your Soul" = "Mr. Lucky Theme"
4. "Herbie's Blues" = "Bird House"
5. "Soul Power" = "Day Dreams"
6. "Cat Call" = "I'm an Old Cowhand"

("It's a Beautiful Evening" is missing.)

Further titles with Hancock starring on the (CD) cover were e.g. Rock Your Soul, Voyager, Jammin' or just Hancock!. Other examples are "Donald Byrd Pepper Adams Quintet featuring Herbie Hancock – Touchstone" or "Herbie Hancock with Donald Byrd/Pepper Adams Quintet".
