= Abercrombie Quartet =

Studio album by the Abercrombie Quartet
- Released: 1980
- Recorded: November 1979
- Studios: Talent; Oslo, Norway
- Genre: Jazz
- Length: 45:11
- Label: ECM 1164
- Producer: Manfred Eicher

John Abercrombie chronology
Straight Flight (1979)	Abercrombie Quartet (1980)	M (1981)

Professional ratings
Review scores
Source	Rating
AllMusic	2.5/5 stars
The Rolling Stone Jazz Record Guide	3/5 stars
DownBeat	3.5/5 stars

Abercrombie Quartet is an album by the Abercrombie Quartet, recorded in November 1979 and released on ECM Records the following year. The quartet features guitarist John Abercrombie with rhythm section Richie Beirach, George Mraz and Peter Donald.

== Track listing ==
All tracks are written by John Abercrombie except as noted.

No.	Title	Writer(s)	Length
1.	"Blue Wolf"		8:20
2.	"Dear Rain"		6:49
3.	"Stray"	Richie Beirach	6:39
4.	"Madagascar"	Beirach	9:00
5.	"Riddles"	Beirach	8:07
6.	"Foolish Dog"		6:16

== Personnel ==
- John Abercrombie – guitar, mandolin
- Richie Beirach – piano
- George Mraz – double bass
- Peter Donald – drums
