= California Cookin' =

1991 live album by Pepper Adams

Live album by Pepper Adams
- Released: 1991
- Recorded: March 26, 1983
- Venue: Orange Coast College, Costa Mesa, CA
- Genre: Jazz
- Length: 50:29
- Label: Interplay IP 8608
- Producer: Fred Norsworthy

Pepper Adams chronology
Urban Dreams (1981)	California Cookin' (1991)	Conjuration: Fat Tuesday's Session (1983)

California Cookin', is a live album by baritone saxophonist Pepper Adams that was recorded in California in 1983 and originally released on the Interplay label in 1991.

== Track listing ==
All compositions by Pepper Adams except where noted

1. "Valse Celtique" – 13:31
2. "Summertime" (George Gershwin, DuBose Heyward) – 9:57
3. "Last Resort" (Victor Feldman) – 7:01
4. "Now in Our Lives" – 10:27
5. "Oleo" (Sonny Rollins) – 9:33
6. "Doctor Deep"

== Personnel ==
- Pepper Adams – baritone saxophone
- Ted Curson – trumpet
- Victor Feldman – piano
- Bob Magnusson – bass
- Carl Burnett – drums
