= City Lights (Lee Morgan album) =

Studio album by Lee Morgan
- Released: June 1958
- Recorded: August 25, 1957
- Studio: Van Gelder Studio; Hackensack, NJ
- Genre: Hard bop
- Length: 37:19
- Label: Blue Note; BLP 1575
- Producer: Alfred Lion

Lee Morgan chronology
Lee Morgan Vol. 3 (1957)	City Lights (1958)	The Cooker (1958)

City Lights is an album by American jazz trumpeter Lee Morgan recorded on August 25, 1957 and released on Blue Note the following year. The sextet features horn section Curtis Fuller and George Coleman and rhythm section Ray Bryant, Paul Chambers and Art Taylor.

== Reception ==
The AllMusic review by Scott Yanow states, "Trumpeter Lee Morgan (then 19) is in excellent form, holding his own with his impressive sidemen (trombonist Curtis Fuller, George Coleman on tenor and alto, pianist Ray Bryant, bassist Paul Chambers and drummer Art Taylor). Highlights include 'City Lights,' 'You're Mine You' and 'Just By Myself'. This fine session has been reissued as part of Lee Morgan's four-CD Mosaic box set."

In an October 1958 edition of DownBeat, Dom Cerulli awarded the album four of five stars, noting that Morgan "has remarkable control of his horn, a wealth of creativity, and an assurance that promises more to come if he can sustain his present pace."

Professional ratings
Review scores
Source	Rating
AllMusic	4/5 stars
DownBeat	4/5 stars

== Track listing ==
Side 1
No.	Title	Writer(s)	Length
1.	"City Lights"	Benny Golson	5:46
2.	"Tempo de Waltz"	Golson	6:24
3.	"You're Mine You"	Johnny Green; Edward Heyman	6:03

Side 2
No.	Title	Writer(s)	Length
1.	"Just by Myself"	Golson	9:24
2.	"Kin Folks"	Gigi Gryce	9:42

== Personnel ==
=== Musicians ===
- Lee Morgan – trumpet
- Curtis Fuller – trombone
- George Coleman – tenor saxophone, alto saxophone (on "Tempo de Waltz" and "Kin Folks")
- Ray Bryant – piano
- Paul Chambers – bass
- Art Taylor – drums

=== Technical personnel ===
- Alfred Lion – producer
- Rudy Van Gelder – recording engineer, mastering
- Reid Miles – design
- Francis Wolff – photography
- Leonard Feather – liner notes
