= Motor City Scene =

Studio album by Pepper Adams & Donald Byrd
- Released: 1961
- Recorded: 1960; New York City, NY
- Genre: Jazz
- Length: 42:56
- Label: Bethlehem

Pepper Adams chronology
10 to 4 at the 5 Spot (1960)	Motor City Scene (1961)	Out of this World (1961)

Donald Byrd chronology
At the Half Note Cafe (1960)	Motor City Scene (1960)	Out of this World (1961)

Motor City Scene, also released as Stardust, is an album by American saxophonist Pepper Adams and trumpeter Donald Byrd, recorded in 1960 and released on the Bethlehem label as BCP 6056 featuring Byrd and Adams with Kenny Burrell, Tommy Flanagan, Paul Chambers, and Louis Hayes. It is not to be confused with the identically titled 1959 Thad Jones album on United Artists Records (UAS 5025) that also featured Tommy Flanagan and Paul Chambers, along with Al Grey, Billy Mitchell, and Elvin Jones.

== Reception ==
The Allmusic review by Michael G. Nastos awarded the album 3 stars and stated "Fine solos from the front-liners save this disc, as their formidable powers still show great promise. Two years hence, this band was a top-drawer attraction, but somehow this session doesn't gel to the extent many might have hoped it would". The review by Scott Yanow of Pepper Adams' album Stardust awarded the album 4 stars and stating it was "Well worth searching for". It was also released on CD as In a Soulful Mood by Donald Byrd

Professional ratings
Review scores
Source	Rating
Allmusic	3/5 stars

== Track listing ==
1. "Stardust" (Hoagy Carmichael, Mitchell Parish) – 10:16
2. "Philson" (Pepper Adams) – 10:44
3. "Trio" (Erroll Garner) – 8:06
4. "Libeccio" (Pepper Adams) – 8:38
5. "Bitty Ditty" (Thad Jones) – 5:12

== Personnel ==
- Pepper Adams – baritone saxophone - except track 1
- Donald Byrd – trumpet
- Kenny Burrell – electric guitar - except track 1
- Tommy Flanagan – piano
- Paul Chambers – bass
- Louis Hayes – drums

Technical

- Dan Quest – cover illustration
