= Chant (Donald Byrd album) =

Studio album by Donald Byrd
- Released: 1979
- Recorded: April 17, 1961
- Studio: Van Gelder Studio, Englewood Cliffs
- Genre: Jazz
- Length: 44:57
- Label: Blue Note; LT 991
- Producer: Alfred Lion

Donald Byrd chronology
Out of this World (1961)	Chant (1979)	The Cat Walk (1961)

Alternative cover
- Japanese issue

Chant is an album by American trumpeter Donald Byrd recorded in 1961 but not released on the Blue Note label until 1979.

== Reception ==
Allmusic awarded the album 4 1/2 stars and the review by Scott Yanow states, "This is superior hard bop from the early '60s".

Professional ratings
Review scores
Source	Rating
Allmusic	4.5/5 stars

== Track listing ==
1. "I'm an Old Cowhand from the Rio Grande" (Johnny Mercer) – 7:39
2. "You're Next" (Donald Byrd) – 7:25
3. "Chant" (Duke Pearson) – 8:50
4. "That's All" (Alan Brandt, Bob Haymes) – 9:33
5. "Great God" (Byrd) – 6:58
6. "Sophisticated Lady" (Duke Ellington, Irving Mills, Mitchell Parish) – 4:32

== Personnel ==
- Donald Byrd – trumpet (tracks 1–5)
- Pepper Adams – baritone saxophone
- Herbie Hancock – piano
- Doug Watkins – bass
- Teddy Robinson – drums ("Eddy" on album cover)
