= Urban Dreams =

1981 album by baritone saxophonist Pepper Adams

Studio album by Pepper Adams
- Released: 1981
- Recorded: September 30, 1981
- Studio: Van Gelder Studio, Englewood Cliffs, NJ
- Genre: Jazz
- Length: 38:58
- Label: Palo Alto; PA 8009
- Producer: Bob Porter

Pepper Adams chronology
The Master... (1980)	Urban Dreams (1981)	California Cookin' (1983)

Urban Dreams, is an album by jazz baritone saxophonist Pepper Adams, recorded in 1981 and originally released on the Palo Alto label.

== Reception ==
Professional ratings
Review scores
Source	Rating
AllMusic	4/5 stars
The Penguin Guide to Jazz	3.5/4 stars
The Rolling Stone Jazz Record Guide	4/5 stars

The AllMusic review by Scott Yanow states that "it is one of his best recordings". On All About Jazz, Derek Taylor said: "Pepper Adams' memory lives on in this immensely enjoyable and easily recommendable album." The Penguin Guide to Jazz described the album as "a late, great flowering of Pepper's talent".

== Track listing ==
All compositions by Pepper Adams, except where indicated.

1. "Dexter Rides Again" (Dexter Gordon) – 6:27
2. "Urban Dreams" – 4:44
3. "Three Little Words" (Harry Ruby, Bert Kalmar) – 7:18
4. "Time on My Hands" (Vincent Youmans, Harold Adamson, Mack Gordon) – 6:55
5. "Pent Up House" (Sonny Rollins) – 7:04
6. "Trentino" – 6:51

== Personnel ==
- Pepper Adams – baritone saxophone
- Jimmy Rowles – piano
- George Mraz – bass
- Billy Hart – drums
