= Conjuration: Fat Tuesday's Session =

Live album by Pepper Adams
- Released: 1984
- Recorded: August 19–20, 1983
- Venues: Fat Tuesday's, NYC
- Genre: Jazz
- Length: 68:17 CD with bonus tracks
- Labels: Uptown UP 27.16; Reservoir RSR CD 113
- Producer: Mark Feldman

Pepper Adams chronology
California Cookin' (1983)	Conjuration: Fat Tuesday's Session (1984)	Generations (1984)

Live at Fat Tuesday's cover

Conjuration: Fat Tuesday's Session is a live album by baritone saxophonist Pepper Adams featuring trumpeter Kenny Wheeler which was recorded in August 1983 and originally released on the Uptown label in 1984 as Live at Fat Tuesdays then released on CD with additional tracks on Reservoir Records in 1990.

== Reception ==
Professional ratings
Review scores
Source	Rating
The Penguin Guide to Jazz	3.5/4 stars
Allmusic	4.5/5 stars

Adams' and Wheeler's performance on Conjuration was nominated in the 27th Annual Grammy Awards for "Best Jazz Instrumental Performance as a Soloist"; the award ultimately went to Wynton Marsalis for "Hot House Flowers".

According to The Penguin Guide to Jazz, Conjuration is: "A heartening farewell to Adams career on record" noting "this live set emphasises his virtues – the muscularity of sound, oversized tone and plangent phrasing – so decisively that one overlooks any scent of routine in his playing". The AllMusic review states "The great baritonist Pepper Adams is teamed up with the adventurous trumpeter Kenny Wheeler and veteran pianist Hank Jones for this live quintet date. Wheeler, although often associated with the avant-garde, has never had any difficulty playing changes and his strong style clearly inspired Adams".

== Track listing ==
All compositions by Pepper Adams, except where indicated.

1. "Conjuration" – 7:47
2. "Alone Together" (Arthur Schwartz, Howard Dietz) – 8:17
3. "Diabolique II" – 7:58
4. "Claudette's Way" – 7:35 Bonus track on CD release
5. "Dylan's Delight" – 6:46 Bonus track on CD release
6. "Dr. Deep" – 7:33
7. "Old Ballad" – (Kenny Wheeler) 7:10
8. "Quittin' Time" (Thad Jones) – 6:52 Bonus track on CD release
9. "Dobbin" – 5:45
10. "Tis" (Jones) – 2:34

== Personnel ==
- Pepper Adams – baritone saxophone
- Kenny Wheeler – trumpet, flugelhorn
- Hank Jones – piano
- Clint Houston – bass
- Louis Hayes – drums
