= Newklear Music =

Studio album by Keystone Trio
- Recorded: February 19, 1997
- Studio: Clinton Recording Studios, New York City
- Genre: Jazz
- Label: Milestone
- Producer: Todd Barkan

John Hicks chronology
Heart Beats (1995)	Newklear Music (1997)	Something to Live For: A Billy Strayhorn Songbook (1997)

Newklear Music is an album by the Keystone Trio – pianist John Hicks, bassist George Mraz, and drummer Idris Muhammad.

== Background ==
The trio of pianist John Hicks, bassist George Mraz, and drummer Idris Muhammad was assembled for a recording led by saxophonist Archie Shepp in 1995. That session was produced by Todd Barkan for Venus Records. He commented that "It was magic! A telepathy, balance, and cohesiveness that I rarely hear." The trio subsequently recorded Heart Beats in December 1995. Newklear Music is a tribute to the music of saxophonist Sonny Rollins, whose nickname is "Newk".

== Recording and music ==
The album was recorded at Clinton Recording Studios in New York City, on February 19, 1997. Barkan was the producer. The Penguin Guide to Jazz observed that "What is immediately clear is that Newk writes songs, not chord shapes."

== Release ==
Newklear Music was released by Milestone Records.

== Reception ==
Professional ratings
Review scores
Source	Rating
AllMusic	3/5 stars
The Penguin Guide to Jazz	4/4 stars

The Penguin Guide to Jazz described the album as "piano-trio jazz of the very highest quality". AllMusic concluded that "Although the performances at times lack character, this classy piano trio does provide a fresh perspective on Rollins' music."

== Track listing ==
All compositions by Sonny Rollins except as indicated.

1. "O.T.Y.O.G." – 5:28
2. "Times Slimes" – 8:16
3. "Wynton" – 7:47
4. "Here's to the People" – 5:31
5. "Airegin" – 6:47
6. "Tell Me You Love Me" – 5:58
7. "Silk 'n' Satin" – 6:27
8. "Kids Know" – 4:30
9. "Love Note for Sonny" (John Hicks) – 7:23

== Personnel ==
- John Hicks – piano
- George Mraz – bass
- Idris Muhammad – drums
