= Pepper Adams Plays the Compositions of Charlie Mingus =

Studio album by Pepper Adams
- Released: August 10, 1964
- Recorded: September 9 & 12, 1963
- Studio: NYC
- Genre: Jazz
- Length: 33:11
- Label: Workshop Jazz; WS 219

Pepper Adams chronology
| Out of This World (1961) | Pepper Adams Plays the Compositions of Charlie Mingus (1964) | Mean What You Say (1966) |

Pepper Adams Plays the Compositions of Charlie Mingus, is an album by baritone saxophonist Pepper Adams featuring Quintet and Octet performances of Charles Mingus' compositions which was recorded in 1963 and originally released on the Motown subsidiary label, Workshop Jazz.

== Reception ==
Professional ratings
Review scores
| Source | Rating |
|---|---|
| The Penguin Guide to Jazz | 3/4 stars |
| Allmusic | 4/5 stars |

The Penguin Guide to Jazz states "Adams led this date with his usual no-nonsense authority ... A solid jazz record".

The Allmusic review by Thom Jurek states "This is one of those must-own recordings for fans of Adams; but it is also for those who revere Mingus' work, because, as radical as some of these interpretations are, they were not only sanctioned by, but delighted in by the composer".

== Track listing ==
All compositions by Charles Mingus.

1. "Fables of Faubus" – 4:30
2. "Black Light" – 3:45
3. "Song with Orange" – 2:35
4. "Carolyn" – 5:10
5. "Better Git It in Your Soul" – 4:05
6. "Incarnation" – 5:45
7. "Portrait" – 2:55
8. "Haitian Fight Song" – 7:55
9. "Strollin' Honies" – 5:50

== Personnel ==
- Pepper Adams – baritone saxophone
- Thad Jones – trumpet
- Benny Powell – trombone (tracks 5, 7 & 8)
- Charles McPherson – alto saxophone (tracks 5, 7 & 8)
- Zoot Sims – tenor saxophone (tracks 5, 7 & 8)
- Hank Jones – piano
- Paul Chambers (tracks 1–4, 6 & 9), Bob Cranshaw (tracks 5, 7 & 8) – bass
- Dannie Richmond – drums
