= Heart Beats (Keystone Trio album) =

Studio album by Keystone Trio
- Recorded: December 4, 1995
- Studio: Clinton Recording Studios, New York City
- Genre: Jazz
- Label: Milestone
- Producer: Todd Barkan

John Hicks chronology
Piece for My Peace (1995)	Heart Beats (1995)	Newklear Music (1997)

Heart Beats is an album by the Keystone Trio – pianist John Hicks, bassist George Mraz, and drummer Idris Muhammad.

== Background ==
The trio of pianist John Hicks, bassist George Mraz, and drummer Idris Muhammad was assembled for a recording led by saxophonist Archie Shepp in 1995. That session was produced by Todd Barkan for Venus Records. He commented that "It was magic! A telepathy, balance, and cohesiveness that I rarely hear."

== Recording and music ==
The album was recorded at Clinton Recording Studios in New York City, on December 4, 1995. Barkan was the producer. Vocalist Freddy Cole was added for the track "It Had to Be You".

== Release ==
Heart Beats was released by Milestone Records.

== Reception ==
Professional ratings
Review scores
Source	Rating
AllMusic	4.5/5 stars
The Penguin Guide to Jazz	4/4 stars

The Penguin Guide to Jazz described the album as "piano-trio jazz of the very highest quality". AllMusic concluded that "You're not going to find a better trio than this one, and even more impressive is that each tune seems to be just the right length, with no excess or filler."

== Track listing ==
1. "Speak Low"
2. "I Fall in Love Too Easily"
3. "If I Should Lose You"
4. "It Had to Be You"
5. "How Deep Is the Ocean"
6. "Bewitched, Bothered, and Bewildered"
7. "Dancing in the Dark"
8. "Two Hearts"
9. "Stay as Sweet as You Are"

== Personnel ==
- John Hicks – piano
- George Mraz – bass
- Idris Muhammad – drums
- Freddy Cole – vocals (track 4)
