= Candy (Lee Morgan album) =

Studio album by Lee Morgan
- Released: Late November 1958
- Recorded: November 18, 1957; February 2, 1958
- Studio: Van Gelder Studio; Hackensack, New Jersey
- Genre: Jazz
- Length: 36:35 (LP); 42:01 (CD)
- Label: Blue Note; BLP 1590
- Producer: Alfred Lion

Lee Morgan chronology
The Cooker (1958)	Candy (1958)	Peckin' Time (1959)

Candy is a studio album by American jazz trumpeter Lee Morgan, recorded on November 18, 1957, and February 2, 1958, and released by Blue Note Records in late 1958. The album features Morgan in a quartet setting with pianist Sonny Clark, bassist Doug Watkins, and drummer Art Taylor.

== Reception ==
The AllMusic review by Stacia Proefrock states: "Not merely a technical marvel, his tone on this album was sweet and his playing fluid, infused with joy and crisply articulated emotion. Morgan would later turn out to be an expert songwriter, but here songs like Buddy Johnson's 'Since I Fell for You' and Jimmy Heath's 'C.T.A.' gave him ample space to show off his talents."

Professional ratings
Review scores
Source	Rating
AllMusic	4/5 stars
The Penguin Guide to Jazz	3/4 stars

== Track listing ==
Side 1
No.	Title	Writer(s)	Date recorded	Length
1.	"Candy"	Mack David; Alex Kramer; Joan Whitney Kramer	February 2, 1958	7:06
2.	"Since I Fell for You"	Buddy Johnson	November 18, 1957	5:39
3.	"C.T.A."	Jimmy Heath	February 2, 1958	5:06

Side 2
No.	Title	Writer(s)	Date recorded	Length
1.	"All the Way"	Sammy Cahn; Jimmy Van Heusen	February 2, 1958	7:27
2.	"Who Do You Love, I Hope"	Irving Berlin	February 2, 1958	5:01
3.	"Personality"	Johnny Burke; Van Heusen	November 18, 1957	6:16

CD reissue bonus track
No.	Title	Writer(s)	Date recorded	Length
7.	"All at Once You Love Her"	Hammerstein, Rodgers	November 18, 1957	5:26

== Personnel ==
=== Musicians ===
- Lee Morgan – trumpet
- Sonny Clark – piano
- Doug Watkins – bass
- Art Taylor – drums

=== Technical personnel ===
- Alfred Lion – producer
- Rudy Van Gelder – recording engineer
- Reid Miles – cover design
- Emerick Bronson – photography
- Robert Levin – liner notes
