= Ephemera (Pepper Adams album) =

Studio album by Pepper Adams Quartet
- Released: 1974
- Recorded: September 10, 1973
- Studios: EMI Studios, Manchester Square, London, England
- Genre: Jazz
- Labels: Spotlite; SPJ PA6
- Producer: Tony Williams

Pepper Adams chronology
Encounter! (1968)	Ephemera (1974)	Julian (1975)

Ephemera, is an album by baritone saxophonist Pepper Adams which was recorded in London in 1973 and originally released on the Spotlite label.

== Reception ==
Professional ratings
Review scores
Source	Rating
AllMusic	3.5/5 stars
The Rolling Stone Jazz Record Guide	4/5 stars

The AllMusic review by Scott Yanow states "Adams performs four of his obscure originals (most memorable is the melodic title cut), Thad Jones' "Quiet Lady," "Jitterbug Waltz" and a romping version of Bud Powell's classic "Bouncing with Bud." A fine example of the deep-toned baritonist at his best."

== Track listing ==
All compositions by Pepper Adams except where noted.

1. "Ephemera" – 7:15
2. "Bouncing with Bud" (Bud Powell) – 10:55
3. "Civilization and Its Discontents" – 6:11
4. "Jitterbug Waltz" (Fats Waller) – 6:17
5. "Quiet Lady" (Thad Jones) – 9:23
6. "Patrice" – 6:09
7. "Hellure (How Are You're)" – 4:56

== Personnel ==
- Pepper Adams – baritone saxophone
- Roland Hanna – piano
- George Mraz – bass
- Mel Lewis – drums
