= Royal Flush (album) =

Studio album by Donald Byrd
- Released: September 1962
- Recorded: September 21, 1961
- Studio: Van Gelder Studio; Englewood Cliffs, New Jersey
- Genre: Jazz
- Length: 41:00
- Label: Blue Note; BLP 4101
- Producer: Alfred Lion

Donald Byrd chronology
The Cat Walk (1961)	Royal Flush (1962)	Free Form (1962)

Royal Flush is an album by American jazz trumpeter Donald Byrd recorded on September 21, 1961 and released on Blue Note the following year. Byrd's quintet features saxophonist Pepper Adams and rhythm section Herbie Hancock, Butch Warren and Billy Higgins.

== Background ==
The album is Herbie Hancock's first Blue Note session to be released.

== Reception ==
The AllMusic review by Stephen Thomas Erlewine states, "For the most part, the quintet plays a set of vital hard bop... But what's really interesting is when they begin pushing the boundaries."

Professional ratings
Review scores
Source	Rating
DownBeat	4/5 stars
AllMusic	3/5 stars

== Track listing ==
All compositions by Donald Byrd except as indicated

=== Side 1 ===
1. "Hush" – 6:24
2. "I'm a Fool to Want You" (Joel Herron, Frank Sinatra, Jack Wolf) – 6:15
3. "Jorgie's" – 8:07

=== Side 2 ===
1. "Shangri-La" – 6:37
2. "6M's" – 6:30
3. "Requiem" (Hancock) – 7:07

== Personnel ==
=== Musicians ===
- Donald Byrd – trumpet
- Pepper Adams – baritone saxophone (except "I'm a Fool to Want You")
- Herbie Hancock – piano
- Butch Warren – bass
- Billy Higgins – drums

=== Technical personnel ===
- Alfred Lion – producer
- Rudy Van Gelder – recording engineer
- Reid Miles – design
- Francis Wolff – photography
- Leonard Feather – liner notes

== Charts ==
Chart performance for Royal Flush
Chart (2026)	Peak position
Greek Albums (IFPI)	39
