= Pepper Adams Quintet =

Studio album by Pepper Adams
- Released: 1957
- Recorded: July 10, 1957
- Studio: Radio Recorders, Los Angeles, CA
- Genre: Jazz
- Length: 30:35
- Label: Mode; MOD-LP 112

Pepper Adams chronology
Baritones and French Horns (1957)	Pepper Adams Quintet (1957)	Critics' Choice (1958)

Pepper Adams 5 cover

Pepper Adams Quintet (reissued as Pepper Adams 5), is the debut album by baritone saxophonist Pepper Adams recorded in 1957 and originally released on the Mode label.

== Reception ==
Professional ratings
Review scores
Source	Rating
Allmusic	3/5 stars
The Penguin Guide to Jazz	3/4 stars

The Allmusic review by Ron Wynn states "Pepper Adams ranked among modern jazz's finest baritone saxophonists. His mastery of the middle and lower registers and technical acumen enabled him to play the physically cumbersome baritone with a speed, facility, and style usually restricted to smaller horns. This '57 quintet date featured him in a more relaxed context with West Coast jazz types". The Penguin Guide to Jazz described the album as "unusually relaxed".

== Track listing ==
1. "Unforgettable" (Irving Gordon) – 6:22
2. "Baubles, Bangles and Beads" (George Forrest, Robert Wright) – 8:29
3. "Freddie Froo" (Pepper Adams) – 6:02
4. "My One and Only Love" (Guy Wood, Robert Mellin) – 3:52
5. "Muezzin" (Adams) – 5:52

== Personnel ==
- Pepper Adams – baritone saxophone
- Stu Williamson – trumpet, except track 4
- Carl Perkins – piano
- Leroy Vinnegar – bass
- Mel Lewis – drums
