= Baritone Madness =

1978 debut album by Nick Brignola Sextet featuring Pepper Adams

Studio album by Nick Brignola Sextet featuring Pepper Adams
- Released: 1978
- Recorded: December 22, 1977
- Studio: Blue Rock Studio, NYC
- Genre: Jazz
- Label: Bee Hive; BH 7000
- Producer: Jim Neumann

Pepper Adams chronology
Twelfth & Pingree (1975)	Baritone Madness (1978)	Reflectory (1978)

Nick Brignola chronology
Baritone Madness (1977)	Burn Brigade (1979)

Baritone Madness, is the debut album by baritone saxophonist Nick Brignola's Sextet featuring Pepper Adams which was recorded in late 1977 becoming the first release on the Bee Hive label.

== Reception ==
Professional ratings
Review scores
Source	Rating
Allmusic	4/5 stars

Allmusic writer Scott Yanow states "This album lives up to its title. ... It is obvious from the song titles that this is very much a bebop jam session date, and quite a few sparks do fly.".

== Track listing ==
All compositions by Charlie Parker except where noted.

1. "Donna Lee" – 9:33
2. "Billie's Bounce" – 11:15
3. "Marmeduke" – 11:30
4. "Body and Soul" (Johnny Green, Edward Heyman, Robert Sour, Frank Eyton) – 7:01
5. "Alone Together" (Arthur Schwartz, Howard Dietz) – 6:57

== Personnel ==
- Nick Brignola (tracks 1–4), Pepper Adams (tracks 1–3) – baritone saxophone
- Ted Curson – trumpet, flugelhorn (tracks 2 & 3)
- Derek Smith – piano
- Dave Holland – bass
- Roy Haynes – drums
