= Arcade (John Abercrombie album) =

Studio album by the John Abercrombie Quartet
- Released: 1979
- Recorded: December 1978
- Studio: Talent; Oslo, Norway
- Genre: Jazz
- Length: 39:30
- Label: ECM 1133
- Producer: Manfred Eicher

John Abercrombie chronology
Characters (1978)	Arcade (1979)	Straight Flight (1979)

Arcade is an album by the John Abercrombie Quartet, recorded in December 1978 and released on ECM Records the following year. The quartet features pianist Richie Beirach and rhythm section George Mraz and Peter Donald.

== Critical reception ==
Professional ratings
Review scores
Source	Rating
AllMusic	3/5 stars
The Rolling Stone Jazz Record Guide	3/5 stars
DownBeat	4.5/5 stars
Tom Hull	B+

The Globe and Mail noted that "there's a yearning feeling to [Abercrombie's] playing, a funny decay to his tone and a flitting rhythmic quality to his phrasing."

DownBeat assigned 4.5 stars. Reviewer Douglas Clark wrote, "Some people would call this music arty; I say it is artful. Sure, it’s overly precious sometimes, too poetic maybe, and a little more grit from the barroom floor might not hurt. But there is nothing false here. This, plus the high level of musicianship, makes the album a pleasure to listen to".

== Track listing ==
No.	Title	Writer(s)	Length
1.	"Arcade"	Abercrombie	9:41
2.	"Nightlake"	Beirach	5:35
3.	"Paramour"	Abercrombie	5:10
4.	"Neptune"	Beirach	7:34
5.	"Alchemy"	Beirach	11:30

== Personnel ==
- John Abercrombie – guitar, electric mandolin
- Richie Beirach – piano
- George Mraz – double bass
- Peter Donald – drums
