= The Adams Effect =

Studio album by Pepper Adams
- Released: 1988
- Recorded: June 25–26, 1985
- Studio: Van Gelder Studio, Englewood Cliffs, NJ
- Genre: Jazz
- Length: 49:12 CD with bonus track
- Label: Uptown UP 27.31
- Producer: Robert Sunenblick M.D., Mabel Fraser

Pepper Adams chronology
Generations (1985)	The Adams Effect (1988)

The Adams Effect, is the final album recorded by baritone saxophonist Pepper Adams which was originally released on the Uptown label in 1988 following Adams' death in 1986.

== Reception ==
Professional ratings
Review scores
Source	Rating
Allmusic	2.5/5 stars

The Allmusic review by Scott Yanow states: "Adams still sounded in prime form at the time and, even if none of his tunes became standards, they served as strong and diverse vehicles for the musicians' improvisations. A fine effort by a classic baritone saxophonist".

== Track listing ==
All compositions by Pepper Adams, except where noted.

1. "Binary" – 6:57
2. "Now in Our Lives" – 6:56
3. "Valse Celtique" – 5:45
4. "Dylan's Delight" – 6:21
5. "How I Spent the Night" (Frank Foster) – 7:02
6. "Claudette's Way" – 7:27
7. "Now in Our Lives" [alternate take] – 8:44 Bonus track on CD release

== Personnel ==
- Pepper Adams – baritone saxophone
- Frank Foster – tenor saxophone
- Tommy Flanagan – piano
- Ron Carter – bass
- Billy Hart – drums
