= George Mraz =

Czech-born American jazz bassist (1944–2021)

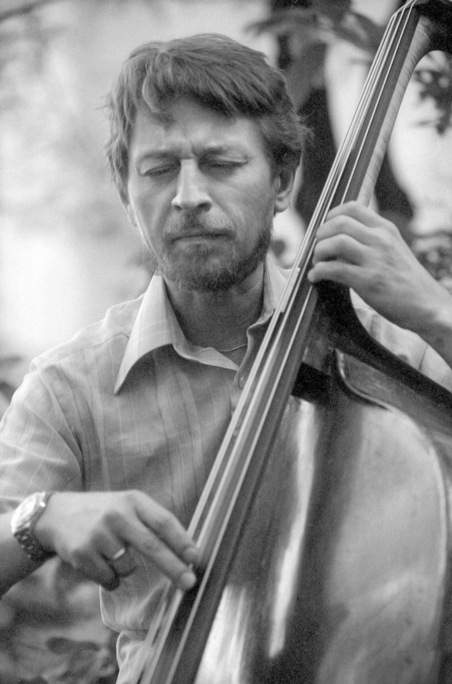
- Mraz in 1983

Background information
- Born: 9 September 1944; Písek, Protectorate of Bohemia and Moravia
- Died: 16 September 2021 (aged 77) Prague, Czech Republic
- Genres: Jazz
- Instruments: Double bass; alto saxophone

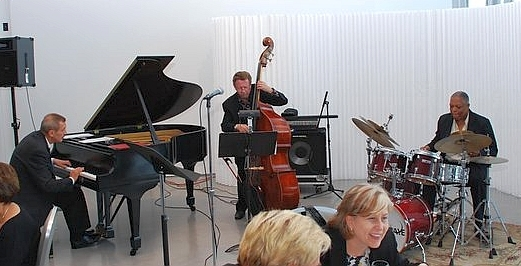
Mraz (center) performing with Emil Viklický (piano) and Billy Hart (drums)

George Mraz (born Jiří Mráz; 9 September 1944 – 16 September 2021) was a Czech-born American jazz bassist and alto saxophonist. He was a member of Oscar Peterson's group, and worked with Pepper Adams, Stan Getz, Michel Petrucciani, Stephane Grappelli, Tommy Flanagan, Jimmy Raney, Chet Baker, Barry Harris, Joe Henderson, John Abercrombie, John Scofield, and Richie Beirach, among others.

During the 1970s, he was a member of the New York Jazz Quartet and The Thad Jones/Mel Lewis Orchestra, and in the 1980s a member of Quest. He also appeared with Joe Lovano, Hank Jones and Paul Motian on Lovano's records I'm All For You and Joyous Encounter.

Mraz died on September 16, 2021, in Prague. The immediate cause of death was undisclosed, though he had battled pancreatic cancer in 2016.

== Discography ==
=== As leader/co-leader ===
- 1977: Alone Together with Masaru Imada (Three Blind Mice)
- 1982: Classic Jazz Duets with Adam Makowicz
- 1992: Catching Up
- 1995: Jazz with Richie Beirach, Billy Hart, Larry Willis, Rich Perry
- 1995: My Foolish Heart with Richie Beirach, Billy Hart
- 1997: Bottom Lines with Cyrus Chestnut, Al Foster, Rich Perry
- 1999: Duke's Place with Renee Rosnes, Billy Drummond, Cyrus Chestnut
- 2002: Morava with Billy Hart, Emil Viklicky, Zuzana Lapčíková
- 2007: Moravian Gems with Iva Bittova, Emil Viklicky, Laco Tropp
- 2012: George Mraz quartet-Jazz na Hrade with David Hazeltine, Rich Perry, Joey Baron
- 2014: Together Again with Emil Viklický

=== As a member ===
The Thad Jones/Mel Lewis Orchestra

- Suite for Pops (A&M, 1972)
- Potpourri (Philadelphia International, 1974)
- Live in Tokyo (Denon, 1974)
- Thad Jones/Mel Lewis and Manuel De Sica (Pausa, 1976)
- New Life (A&M, 1976)

The New York Jazz Quartet

- The New York Jazz Quartet In Concert In Japan (Salvation (Japan), 1975)
- Surge (Enja, 1977)
- Song of the Black Knight (Sonet, 1977)
- Blues for Sarka (Enja, 1978)
- New York Jazz Quartet in Chicago (Bee Hive, 1981)
- Oasis (Enja, 1981)
- Manhattan David Hazeltine - George Mraz Trio (Chesky, 2006)
- Your StoryGeorge Mraz / David Hazeltine Trio (Cube - Metier, 2012)

Keystone Trio

- Heart Beats (Milestone, 1995)
- Newklear Music (Milestone, 1997)

=== As sideman ===
With John Abercrombie

- Arcade (ECM, 1978)
- Abercrombie Quartet (ECM, 1979)
- Straight Flight (JAM, 1979)
- M (ECM, 1980)
- Solar (1985)
- Farewell (Emarcy 9832649, 1993)

With Pepper Adams

- Ephemera (Spotlite, 1973)
- Julian (Enja, 1975)
- Twelfth & Pingree (Enja, 1975)
- Reflectory (Muse, 1978)
- The Master... (Muse, 1980)
- Urban Dreams (Palo Alto, 1981)

With Toshiko Akiyoshi

- Time Stream (1984)
- Four Seasons (1990)
- Remembering Bud: Cleopatra's Dream (1990)
- Time Stream: Toshiko Plays Toshiko (1996)
- Hope (2006)
- 50th Anniversary Concert in Japan (2006)

With Richie Beirach

- Elm (ECM, 1979)
- Rendezvous (International Phonograph Inc., 1981)
- Elegy for Bill Evans (Storyville, 1981)
- Inborn (Jazzline n 78049, 1989)
- Some Other Time : A Tribute to Chet Baker (Triloka, 1992)
- The Snow Leopard (Evidence, 1997)
- What Is This Thing Called Love? (Venus, 1999)
- Round about Bartok (ACT, 2002)
- Round about Monteverdi (ACT 9412-2, 2003)

With Benny Carter

- In the Mood for Swing (MusicMasters, 1988)
- My Man Benny, My Man Phil (MusicMasters, 1990)

With Jon Faddis

- Jon & Billy (Trio, 1974) with Billy Harper
- Youngblood (Pablo, 1976)

With Tommy Flanagan

- Eclypso (Enja, 1977)
- Ballads & Blues (Enja, 1978)
- Confirmation (Enja, 1977–78 [1982])
- The Magnificent Tommy Flanagan (Progressive, 1981)
- Giant Steps (Enja, 1982)
- Thelonica (Enja, 1982)
- Nights at the Vanguard (Uptown, 1986)
- Jazz Poet (Timeless SPJ301, 1989)
- Beyond the Blue Bird (1990)

With Stan Getz

- Line for Lyons (Sonet, 1983) with Chet Baker
- The Stockholm Concert (Sonet, 1983 [1989])
- Voyage (Blackhawk, 1986)
- Bossas & Ballads – The Lost Sessions (Verve, 1989 [2003])

With Dizzy Gillespie

- The Winter in Lisbon (Milan, 1990)
- Bird Songs: The Final Recordings (Telarc, 1992)
- To Bird with Love (Telarc, 1992)

With Sir Roland Hanna

- 1 X 1 (Toho (Japan), 1974)
- Porgy & Bess (Trio (Japan), 1976)
- 24 Preludes Book 1 (Salvation (Japan), 1976)
- Time for the Dancers (Progressive, 1977)
- Sir Elf Plus 1 (Choice, 1977)
- Glove (Trio (Japan), 1977)
- 24 Preludes Book 2 (Salvation (Japan), 1977)
- This Must Be Love (Progressive 1978)
- Rolandscape (Progressive, 1978)
- Roland Hanna and George Mraz Play for Monk (Musical Heritage Society, 1978)
- Sunrise, Sunset (LOB, 1979)
- Romanesque (Trio (Japan), 1982)
- This Must Be Love (Audiophile, 1983)
- Milano, Paris, New York: Finding John Lewis (Venus, 2002)

With Elvin Jones

- Earth Jones (Palo Alto, 1982)
- Youngblood (Enja, 1992)

With Jimmy Knepper

- Cunningbird (SteepleChase, 1976)
- I Dream Too Much (Soul Note, 1984)
- Dream Dancing (Criss Cross, 1986)

With Joe Lovano

- Grand Slam
- Celebrating Sinatra (Blue Note, 1996)
- I'm All For You (Blue Note, 2003)
- Joyous Encounter (Blue Note, 2004)
- Classic! Live at Newport (Blue Note, 2016)

With Warne Marsh

- Star Highs (Criss Cross Jazz, 1982)
- Posthumous (Interplay, 1985 [1987])

With Greg Marvin

- The Greg Marvin Quartet (Hi Hat, Planet X, 1986)
- I'll Get By (Planet X, 1987)
- Workout! (Planet X, 1988)
- Wake-up Call! (Planet X, 1996)
- Special Edition (Planet X, 2001)

With Tete Montoliu

- Body & Soul (Enja, 1971 [1983])
- I Wanna Talk About You (SteepleChase, 1980)
- The Man from Barcelona (Timeless, 1990)

With Art Pepper

- Thursday Night at the Village Vanguard (Contemporary, 1977 [1979])
- Friday Night at the Village Vanguard (Contemporary, 1977 [1979])
- Saturday Night at the Village Vanguard (Contemporary, 1977 [1979])
- More for Les at the Village Vanguard (Contemporary, 1977 [1985])

With Oscar Peterson

- Another Day (MPS, 1970)
- In Tune (MPS, 1971)
- Walking the Line (MPS, 1971)

With Jimmy Raney

- Wisteria (Criss Cross, 1985) with Tommy Flanagan
- But Beautiful (Criss Cross, 1991)

With Zoot Sims

- Zoot Sims and the Gershwin Brothers (Pablo, 1975)
- Soprano Sax (Pablo, 1976)
- If I'm Lucky (Pablo, 1977) with Jimmy Rowles
- For Lady Day (Pablo, 1978 [1991])
- Warm Tenor (Pablo, 1979) with Jimmy Rowles
- The Sweetest Sounds (Pablo Today, 1979) with Rune Gustafsson

With others

- Eric Alexander, Solid! (Milestone, 1998)
- Lorez Alexandria, My One and Only Love (CBS/Sony, 1987)
- Chet Baker, Studio Trieste (CTI, 1982) with Jim Hall and Hubert Laws
- Kenny Barron, Minor Blues (Venus, 2009)
- Dee Dee Bridgewater, Afro Blue (Trio, 1974)
- Bob Brookmeyer, Back Again (Sonet, 1978)
- Kenny Burrell, Ellington Is Forever Volume Two (Fantasy, 1975)
- George Cables, Senorita de Aranjuez (Meldec Jazz, 2001)
- Arnett Cobb, Arnett Cobb Is Back (Progressive, 1978)
- Larry Coryell, Comin' Home (Muse, 1984)
- Kenny Drew, Lite Flite (SteepleChase, 1977)
- Yelena Eckemoff, A Touch of Radiance (L&H, 2014)
- Art Farmer, Crawl Space (CTI, 1977)
- Urbie Green, The Fox (CTI, 1976)
- Jim Hall, Jim Hall & Basses (Telarc, 2001)
- Jaroslav Jakubovič, Coincidence (VMM, 2009)
- Scott Hamilton, The Grand Appearance (Progressive, 1979)
- Fred Lipsius, Dreaming of Your Love, (mja Records, 1995)
- Steve Kuhn, Steve Kuhn Live in New York (Cobblestone, 1972)
- Andy LaVerne and Al Foster, Time Well Spent (1994)
- John Lewis, Evolution II (Atlantic, 2001)
- Kevin Mahogany, An Evening of Ballads (Live) (Mahogany Jazz, 2024)
- Carmen McRae, Carmen Sings Monk (Bluebird, 1988)
- Charles Mingus, Three or Four Shades of Blues (Atlantic, 1977)
- Mark Murphy, The Artistry of Mark Murphy (Muse, 1982)
- Mike Nock, In Out and Around (featuring Mike Brecker and Al Foster) (1979)
- Michel Petrucciani & Stephane Grappelli, Flamingo (Dreyfus, 1996)
- Quest, Quest (Trio/Palo Alto, 1981)
- John Scofield, John Scofield Live (Enja, 1977)
- McCoy Tyner, McCoy Tyner Plays John Coltrane: Live at the Village Vanguard (Impulse!, 1997)
- Mal Waldron, Mal 81 (Progressive, 1981)
- Larry Willis, My Funny Valentine (Jazz City, 1988)
