= M (John Abercrombie Quartet album) =

Studio album by the Abercrombie Quartet
- Released: 1981
- Recorded: November 1980
- Studio: Tonstudio Bauer; Ludwigsburg, W. Germany
- Genre: Jazz
- Length: 45:28
- Label: ECM 1191
- Producer: Manfred Eicher

John Abercrombie chronology
Abercrombie Quartet (1980)	M (1981)	Five Years Later (1982)

M is an album by the Abercrombie Quartet, recorded in November 1980 and released on ECM Records the following year. the quartet features guitarist John Abercrombie and pianist Richie Beirach with rhythm section George Mraz and Peter Donald.

== Reception ==
The AllMusic review by Jim Todd stated: "If only all of this set were as brilliantly melodic and driving as its best three tracks."

Professional ratings
Review scores
Source	Rating
AllMusic	2.5/5 stars
The Rolling Stone Jazz Record Guide	3/5 stars

== Track listing ==
All tracks are written by John Abercrombie except as noted.

No.	Title	Writer(s)	Length
1.	"Boat Song"		9:52
2.	"M"		6:17
3.	"What Are the Rules?"	Richie Beirach	7:28
4.	"Flashback"	Beirach	6:13
5.	"To Be"		5:14
6.	"Veils"	Beirach	5:42
7.	"Pebbles"	George Mraz	4:42

== Personnel ==
- John Abercrombie – electric guitar, acoustic guitar
- Richie Beirach – piano
- George Mraz – double bass
- Peter Donald – drums
