= Beyond the Blue Bird =

Studio album by Tommy Flanagan
- Released: 1991
- Recorded: April 29–30, 1990
- Studio: Studio 44, Monster, Netherlands
- Genre: Jazz
- Label: Timeless; SJP 350

Tommy Flanagan chronology
Jazz Poet (1989)	Beyond the Blue Bird (1991)	Flanagan's Shenanigans (1993)

Professional ratings
Review scores
Source	Rating
AllMusic	4.5/5 stars
The Penguin Guide to Jazz	3.5/4 stars

Beyond the Blue Bird is an album by jazz pianist Tommy Flanagan, with guitarist Kenny Burrell, bassist George Mraz, and drummer Lewis Nash.

== Background ==
Flanagan's first musical residence, in 1949, was at the Blue Bird Inn in Detroit. As a teenager, he also played with guitarist Kenny Burrell. After two years of military service, Flanagan again became house pianist at the Blue Bird, and again worked with Burrell.

== Recording and music ==
The album was recorded on April 29 and 30, 1990, at Studio 44, in Monster, the Netherlands.

== Reception ==
The AllMusic reviewer concluded that the album is "a perfect introduction to this tasteful, swinging and creative (within the bop mainstream) pianist."

== Track listing ==
1. "Bluebird"
2. "Yesterdays"
3. "50-21"
4. "Blues in My Heart"
5. "Barbados"
6. "Beyond the Bluebird"
7. "Nascimento"
8. "The Con Man"
9. "Something Borrowed Something Blue"
10. "Bluebird After Dark"

== Personnel ==
- Tommy Flanagan – piano
- Kenny Burrell – guitar
- George Mraz – bass
- Lewis Nash – drums
