= 10 to 4 at the 5 Spot =

Live album by Pepper Adams Quintet
- Released: 1958
- Recorded: April 15, 1958
- Venues: Five Spot Café, New York City
- Genre: Jazz
- Length: 39:12
- Labels: Riverside; RLP 12-265
- Producer: Orrin Keepnews

Pepper Adams chronology
The Pepper-Knepper Quintet (1958)	10 to 4 at the 5 Spot (1958)	Motor City Scene (1960)

10 to 4 at the 5 Spot is a live album by saxophonist Pepper Adams' Quintet which was recorded at the Five Spot Café in 1958 for the Riverside label.

== Reception ==
Allmusic awarded the album 4 1/2 stars. In his review, Michael G. Nastos states, "This album, one of the first club dates recorded for the Riverside label, may have presented logistic problems with the acoustics, mic placements, and reel to reel tape technology, but there were no such issues with the extraordinary music contained on this effort... There's a palpable sense of democracy, shared values, and above all, balance in this band of expert modern jazz pioneers. It's a keeper, and one of the best recordings of any band in this era". The Penguin Guide to Jazz awarded the album 3 stars (out of 4) stating "The live session, made with a frequent partner at the time, Donald Byrd, is typical of Adams's kind of date, with muscular blow-outs of the order of 'Hastings Street Bounce' sitting next to a clear-headed ballad reading of 'You're My Thrill'; That said it's sometimes only the novelty of hearing a baritone in the ensembles that lifts the music out of a professional hard-bop routine".

Professional ratings
Review scores
Source	Rating
Allmusic	4.5/5 stars
The Penguin Guide to Jazz	3/4 stars
The Rolling Stone Jazz Record Guide	4/5 stars

== Track listing ==
No.	Title	Writer(s)	Length
1.	"'Tis (Theme)"	Thad Jones	6:07
2.	"You're My Thrill"	Sidney Clare, Jay Gorney	5:09
3.	"The Long Two/Four"	Donald Byrd	10:41
4.	"Hastings Street Bounce"	Traditional	11:25
5.	"Yourna"	Byrd	6:40

== Personnel ==
- Pepper Adams – baritone saxophone
- Donald Byrd – trumpet (tracks 1 & 3–5)
- Bobby Timmons – piano
- Doug Watkins – bass
- Elvin Jones – drums
