= On View at the Five Spot Cafe =

Live album by Kenny Burrell with Art Blakey
- Released: 1959
- Recorded: August 25, 1959
- Genre: Jazz
- Length: 50:38
- Label: Blue Note
- Producer: Alfred Lion

Kenny Burrell chronology
Blue Lights (1958)	On View at the Five Spot Cafe (1959)	A Night at the Vanguard (1959)

On View at the Five Spot Cafe is a live album by American jazz guitarist Kenny Burrell, with drummer Art Blakey, recorded at the Five Spot Café in New York City on August 25, 1959, and released on Blue Note.

== Reception ==
The AllMusic review by Michael G. Nastos states, "As the dawn of the 1960s saw new-breed jazz being fomented, Burrell, Blakey, and company proved you could still swing and remain melodic while creating new sonic vistas. This recording is easily recommended to all".

English jazz guitarist Andy Summers referred to Burrell's solo on "Lover Man" as "one of the best jazz guitar solos ever recorded."

Professional ratings
Review scores
Source	Rating
AllMusic	3.5/5 stars
DownBeat	3.5/5 stars

== Track listing ==
Note: On all releases issued by Blue Note, Blue Note Japan, or otherwise licensed by EMI Records, the composition "Hackensack" by Thelonious Monk and Coleman Hawkins is listed as "Lady Be Good" by George Gershwin and Ira Gershwin. "Hackensack" is a contrafact of "Oh, Lady Be Good!". The track listings that follow reflect the listings of the physical LP, cassette, and CD releases.

=== Original release ===
==== Side 1 ====
1. "Birks' Works" (Dizzy Gillespie) – 9:15
2. "Hallelujah" (Clifford Grey, Leo Robin, Vincent Youmans) – 11:43

==== Side 2 ====
1. "Lady Be Good" (George Gershwin, Ira Gershwin) – 8:15
2. "Lover Man" (Jimmy Davis, Ram Ramirez, James Sherman) – 9:48
3. "36-23-36" (Kenny Burrell) – 3:35

=== CD reissue ===
1. "Birks' Works" (Dizzy Gillespie) – 9:15
2. "Lady Be Good" (George Gershwin, Ira Gershwin) – 8:15
3. "Lover Man" (Jimmy Davis, Ram Ramirez, James Sherman) – 9:48
4. "Swingin'" (Clifford Brown) – 9:48 (Bonus track on CD reissue)
5. "Hallelujah" (Clifford Grey, Leo Robin, Vincent Youmans) – 11:43
6. "Beef Stew Blues" (Randy Weston) – 4:32 (Bonus track on CD reissue)
7. "If You Could See Me Now" (Tadd Dameron, Carl Sigman) – 5:25 (Bonus track on CD reissue)
8. "36-23-36" (Kenny Burrell) – 3:35

=== 2025 CD reissue ===
==== Disc One ====
1. "Birks' Works" (Dizzy Gillespie) – 9:43
2. "Hallelujah" (Vincent Youmans) – 8:19 (with Roland Hanna piano)
3. "Lady Be Good" (George Gershwin, Ira Gershwin) – 9:58
4. "Lover Man" (Jimmy Davis, Jimmy Sherman, Roger Ramirez) – 8:20
5. "36-23-36" (Kenny Burrell) – 3:35 (with Roland Hanna piano)
6. "Swingin'" (Clifford Brown) – 9:03
7. "If You Could See Me Now" (Carl Sigman, Tadd Dameron) – 5:25 (with Roland Hanna piano)
8. "Beef Stew Blues" (Randy Weston) – 4:32 (with Roland Hanna piano)

==== Disc Two ====
1. "The Next Time You See Me, Things Won't Be The Same" (Bill Harvey, Earl Forest) – 7:30 (with Roland Hanna piano)
2. "The Take Off" (Kenny Burrell) – 5:30 (with Roland Hanna piano)
3. "Birks' Works" [Alternate Take] (Dizzy Gillespie) – 9:39
4. "Lady Be Good" [Alternate Take] (George Gershwin, Ira Gershwin) – 9:55
5. "Love Walked In" (George Gershwin, Ira Gershwin) – 5:45
6. "36-23-36" / "The Theme" (Kenny Burrell) – 12:27

== Personnel ==
=== Musicians ===
- Kenny Burrell - guitar
- Tina Brooks - tenor saxophone (tracks 1–4)
- Bobby Timmons - piano (tracks 1–4)
- Roland Hanna - piano (tracks 5–8)
- Ben Tucker - bass
- Art Blakey - drums

=== Technical personnel ===
==== Original ====
- Alfred Lion – production
- Rudy Van Gelder – recording engineer, mastering
- Reid Miles – design
- Francis Wolff – photography
- Joe Goldberg – liner notes

==== Reissue ====
- Michael Cuscuna – producer, liner notes
- Ron McMaster – digital transfers

== Charts ==
Chart performance for On View at the Five Spot Cafe
Chart (2025)	Peak position
German Albums (Offizielle Top 100)	77
