= Thelonious in Action =

Live album by the Thelonious Monk Quartet with Johnny Griffin
- Released: 1958
- Recorded: August 7, 1958
- Venue: Five Spot Café, NYC
- Genre: Jazz
- Length: 39:32
- Label: Riverside
- Producer: Orrin Keepnews

Thelonious Monk chronology
Art Blakey's Jazz Messengers with Thelonious Monk (1958)	Thelonious in Action (1958)	Misterioso (1958)

Professional ratings
Review scores
Source	Rating
AllMusic	4.5/5 stars
The Encyclopedia of Popular Music	4/5 stars
The Penguin Guide to Jazz Recordings	3.5/4 stars
The Rolling Stone Jazz Record Guide	5/5 stars

Thelonious in Action is a 1958 live album by American jazz pianist Thelonious Monk, recorded at the Five Spot Café in the Bowery neighborhood of Manhattan on August 7, 1958, at the same show that produced Misterioso. It features the debuts of Monk's compositions "Light Blue" and "Coming on the Hudson".

== Track listing ==
Side one

1. "Light Blue" – 5:14
2. "Coming on the Hudson" – 5:24
3. "Rhythm-A-Ning" – 9:25
4. "Epistrophy (Theme)" – 1:05

Side two

1. "Blue Monk" - 8:31
2. "Evidence" – 8:48
3. "Epistrophy (Theme)" – 1:05

CD bonus tracks

1. "Unidentified Solo Piano" – 1:54*
2. "Blues Five Spot" – 9:56*
3. "In Walked Bud / Epistrophy (Theme)" – 10:57*

* CD bonus tracks were recorded on July 9, 1958

== Personnel ==
Thelonious Monk Quartet

- Thelonious Monk – piano
- Johnny Griffin – tenor saxophone
- Ahmed Abdul-Malik – bass
- Roy Haynes – drums

Technical personnel

- Orrin Keepnews – producer
- Ray Fowler – recording engineer
- Shigeo Miyamoto – mastering engineer
- Paul Bacon – cover design
