= Jazz Poet =

Jazz albym by Tommy Flanagan

Studio album by Tommy Flanagan
- Released: 1989
- Recorded: January 17, 19, 1989
- Studio: Van Gelder, Englewood Cliffs, New Jersey
- Genre: Jazz
- Label: Timeless, Alfa Jazz
- Producer: Wim Wigt, Diana Flanagan

Tommy Flanagan chronology
| Nights at the Vanguard (1986) | Jazz Poet (1989) | Beyond the Blue Bird (1990) |

Jazz Poet is an album by jazz pianist Tommy Flanagan, with bassist George Mraz, and drummer Kenny Washington.

== Recording and music ==
The album was recorded on January 17 and 19, 1989, at Van Gelder Studio, Englewood Cliffs, New Jersey.

== Reception ==
Professional ratings
Review scores
| Source | Rating |
|---|---|
| AllMusic | 4.5/5 stars |
| The Penguin Guide to Jazz | 3/4 stars |

The AllMusic reviewer commented that "Flanagan is at the peak of his powers. Never flashy, never showy, this is just outstanding music performed by a true master". The Penguin Guide to Jazz stated that "the title's a fair passport entry for Tommy; beautifully judged and perfectly performed".

== Track listing (CD releases) ==
1. "Raincheck" (Billy Strayhorn) – 4:58
2. "Lament" (J. J. Johnson) – 5:07
3. "Willow, Weep for Me" (Ann Ronell) – 6:01
4. "Caravan" (Duke Ellington, Juan Tizol, Irving Mills) – 6:21
5. "That Tired Routine Called Love" (Matt Dennis) – 6:47
6. "Glad to Be Unhappy" (Richard Rodgers, Lorenz Hart) – 4:45
7. "St. Louis Blues" (W. C. Handy) – 6:32
8. "Mean Streets" (originally titled "Verdandi") (Tommy Flanagan) – 4:10
9. "I'm Old Fashioned" (Jerome Kern, Johnny Mercer) – 5:40
10. "Você Abusou" (Antonio Carlos & Jocasi) – 4:49

== Personnel ==
- Tommy Flanagan – piano
- George Mraz – bass
- Kenny Washington – drums
