= New York City Cabaret Card =

Card formerly required to perform in New York City

The New York City Cabaret Identification Card was a permit required of all workers, including performers, in nightclubs in New York City, United States from Prohibition to 1967. Its administration was fraught with politics, and some artists' cards were revoked on specious grounds. For many performers, the revocation of their cabaret cards resulted in the loss of their livelihood. Those of Chet Baker, Charlie Parker, Thelonious Monk, Jackie McLean, Elmo Hope, Billy Higgins and Billie Holiday were suspended because of drug charges, Lenny Bruce's for his reputed obscenity.

Burlesque dancer Sally Rand challenged the refusal to issue her a cabaret card, which was refused based on her alleged scanty attire. A judge overturned the decision as an "arbitrary and an unjustified act" but noted that the cabaret regulations took effect only after a card had been issued to a performer and warned her that her privileges could be revoked if she did not follow regulations. J. J. Johnson challenged the withholding of his card at the New York State Supreme Court in May 1959 and won the issue of a valid card.

In 1960, Lord Buckley had his card seized for failure to disclose a 1941 marijuana arrest. Following the seizure of Buckley's card, Harold L. Humes convened a "Citizens' Emergency Committee," which included Norman Mailer, David Amram, and Norman Podhoretz, in the apartment of writer George Plimpton. Humes, Plimpton, Mailer, and Maxwell T. Cohen, Buckley's lawyer, confronted Police Commissioner Stephen P. Kennedy at a raucous hearing. Three weeks later, Buckley died of a stroke, partially attributed to the fight over his card. The scandal of Buckley's death, partially attributed to the seizure of his cabaret card, helped lead to the removal of authority over cabaret cards from the police.

In January 1961, Mayor Robert F. Wagner, Jr., announced that control of the cabaret card system would be removed from the New York City Police Department to the Licensing Department. Due to opposition from the new Mayor, John Lindsay and his appointed Licensing Commissioner, the system was abolished in its entirety in 1967, with the New York City Council voting 35-1 to eliminate the required cards. The Council's discussion of the issue included the reading of a message from Frank Sinatra, who would not perform in New York City and had refused to apply for a cabaret card; he cited the application and investigation process to be "demeaning."
