= Pepper Adams =

American jazz saxophonist (1930–1986)

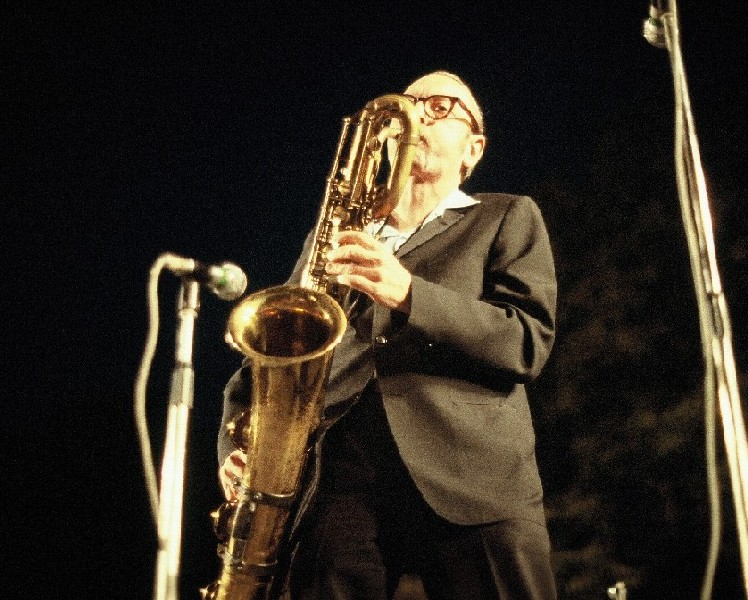
- Adams in 1978

Background information
- Born: Park Frederick Adams III; October 8, 1930; Highland Park, Michigan, U.S.
- Origin: Rochester, New York
- Died: September 10, 1986 (aged 55) Brooklyn, New York
- Genres: Jazz, hard bop, big band
- Occupations: Musician, composer
- Instruments: Baritone saxophone, clarinet
- Years active: 1947–1986
- Labels: Savoy, Prestige, Blue Note, Warwick, Riverside, Enja, Muse
- Formerly of: Thad Jones/Mel Lewis Big Band
- Website: PepperAdams.com

Park Frederick "Pepper" Adams III (October 8, 1930 – September 10, 1986) was an American jazz baritone saxophonist and composer. He composed 42 pieces, was the leader on eighteen albums spanning 28 years, and participated in 600 sessions as a sideman. He worked with an array of musicians, and had especially fruitful collaborations with trumpeter Donald Byrd and as a member of the Thad Jones/Mel Lewis Big Band.

== Biography ==
=== Early life ===
Pepper Adams was born in Highland Park, Michigan, to father Park Adams II, who worked as the manager of a furniture store, and mother, Cleo Marie Coyle. Both of his parents were college graduates, with each spending some time at the University of Michigan.

Due to the onset of the Great Depression, Adams' parents separated to allow his father to find work without geographic dependence. In the fall of 1931, Adams moved with his mother to his extended family's farm near Columbia City, Indiana, where food and support were more readily available. In 1933, Adams began playing piano. His father having reunited with the family, they moved to Rochester, New York, in 1935 and in that city he began his musical efforts on tenor sax and clarinet. Two years later, Adams began deepening his developing passion for music by listening to Fats Waller's daily radio show. He was also influenced at a young age by listening to Fletcher Henderson's big band radio broadcasts out of Nashville, Jimmie Lunceford, Duke Ellington, and Cab Calloway. Adams would later describe "[his] time up until the age of eight or so [as] really just traveling from one place to another". As early as fourth grade, Adams sold cigarettes and candy door-to-door in order to contribute to his family's income for essential items.

Adams' interest in performing further grew in sixth grade when the public school system offered a loaned musical instrument to any student who was interested, and further musical instruction if he could get into the school band. Initially Adams chose the trumpet, then the trombone, but eventually settled on the clarinet, which he played in the school band. The following year Adams attained his lifelong nickname of "Pepper" due to former St. Louis Cardinals star Pepper Martin signing on to manage and play for the hometown minor league team, the Rochester Red Wings. Adams' classmates saw a resemblance between the two, and the nickname stuck. Later in his career, Adams also attained the nickname "the Knife" for "his 'slashing and chopping technique', which had a humbling effect upon musicians fortunate enough to gig with him".

In 1943, Adams skipped school for a week in order to see Ellington play local gigs. He eventually met Rex Stewart, who further introduced him to Harry Carney and other band members. This led to Adams being able to take lessons from Skippy Williams, who was the tenor saxophonist in Ellington's band.

Adams switched to tenor saxophone in the fall of 1943, which was made possible due to his jobs as a box cutter in the mail order room of a jazz store and an usher at a movie theater, allowing him to make enough money to buy the instrument. His job at the jazz store also allowed him to listen to all of the newest available jazz records and led to his emulation of Coleman Hawkins, who he had heard play locally in 1945, and interest in the music of Don Byas. His first steady gig came in 1946 with a six-piece group led by Ben Smith, which then caused him to drop out of school in the 11th grade due to working six nights a week.

=== Early playing career ===
At age 16, Adams and his mother moved to Detroit, where he soon began playing with Willie Wells, who he had heard play for Fletcher Henderson, Fats Navarro, Tommy Flanagan, and Willie Anderson. He had received casual instruction from Wardell Gray and Billy Mitchell, and played with a group led by Little John Wilson as well. Through the employee discount from his job at Grinnell's, a music store in Detroit, Adams purchased what would become his main instrument: the baritone saxophone. He initially purchased a used Bundy baritone saxophone, but later traded it in for a new Selmer 'Balanced Action' E-flat baritone in 1948, which he used until 1978. This switch proved to be successful, as he was soon playing in Lucky Thompson's band. In Detroit, Adams also met several jazz musicians who would become future performing partners, including trumpeter Donald Byrd. He attended Wayne State University. Adams became interested in Wardell Gray's approach to the saxophone, later naming Gray and Harry Carney as his influences. He spent time in a United States Army band, and briefly had a tour of duty in Korea.

Upon returning from Korea, Adams began playing at the Blue Bird Inn in Detroit where he played with Thad Jones. When Jones left to play with Count Basie, Adams then became the music director at the Blue Bird. In late 1954, Adams left the Blue Bird to join Kenny Burrell's group at Klein's Show Bar, also in Detroit, where he would later become musical director following Burrell's departure.

Following the recommendation of friend Oscar Pettiford, Adams joined the Stan Kenton Orchestra in 1956, where he played for a majority of the year until leaving the group to form a new ensemble with Lee Katzman and Mel Lewis in Los Angeles. Before moving to California, he recorded with Kenny Clarke, Curtis Fuller, and Quincy Jones. In April 1957, Adams joined Chet Baker's group, where he played for about a year.

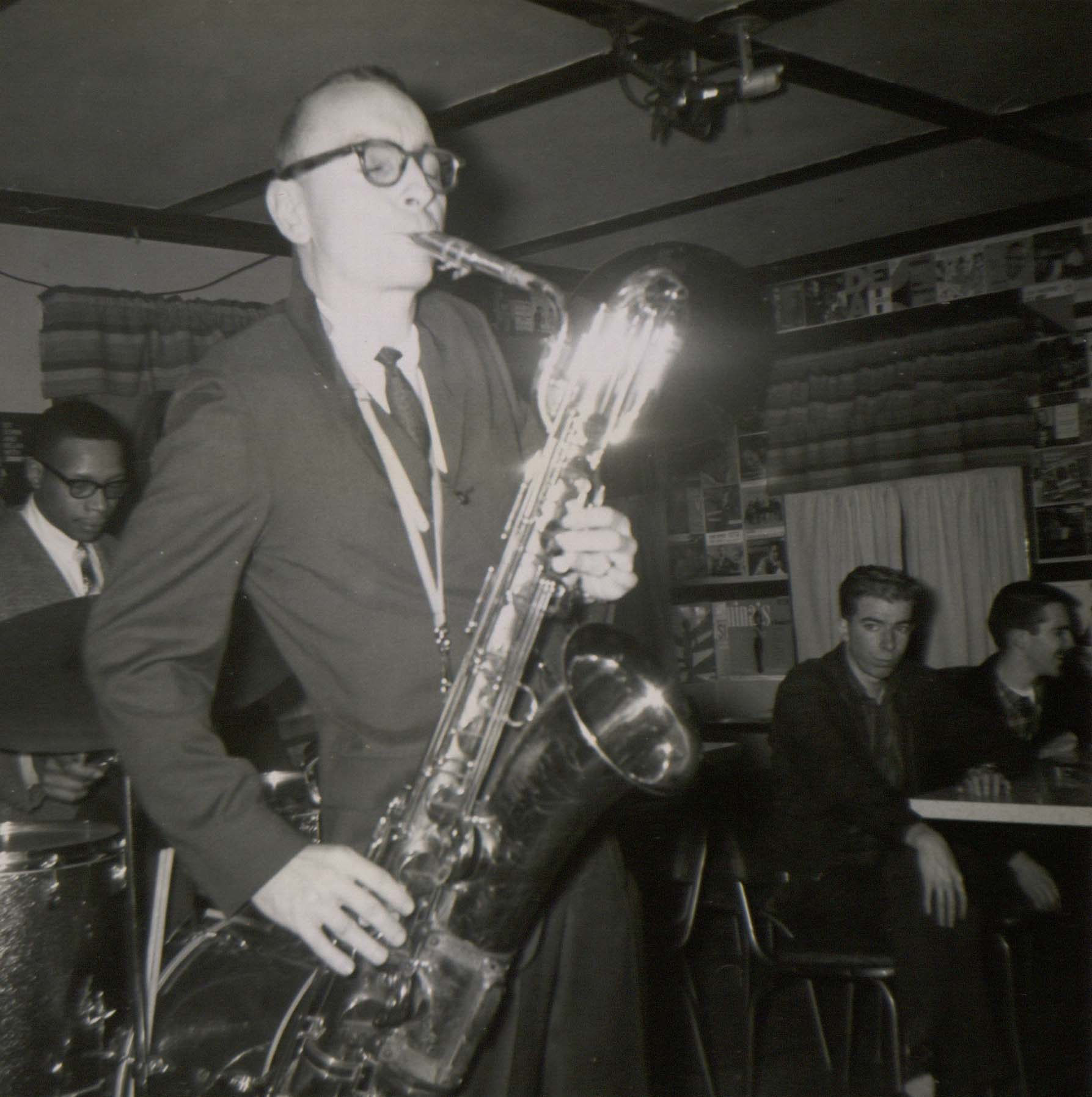
Adams playing at Lennie's on the Turnpike in May 1963

He later moved to New York City, where he performed on the album Baritones and French Horns with Cecil Payne (later re-issued as Dakar as by John Coltrane, who also played on the album), worked with Lee Morgan on The Cooker, and briefly worked with Benny Goodman's band in 1958. During this time, Adams also began working with Charles Mingus, performing on one of Mingus's Atlantic albums of the period, Blues & Roots, which includes Adams' extended solo on "Moanin'". Thereafter, he recorded with Mingus sporadically until the latter's death in 1979. Adams formed a quintet with Donald Byrd in 1958 that lasted until 1961. Following the breakup of the Donald Byrd–Pepper Adams Quintet, Adams lacked a consistent band association until 1965 and the formation of the Thad Jones–Pepper Adams Quintet. During this phase, he performed with the likes of Teddy Charles, Pony Poindexter, Marcus Belgrave, Thelonious Monk, and Lionel Hampton.

In September 1963, Adams made an agreement with Motown Records for an exclusive recording contract and an exclusive management contract with International Talent Management, a Motown affiliate. Prior to signing with Motown, Adams turned down an offer from Harry James to play in his Las Vegas-based band because it was extremely commercial and presented few opportunities to solo, despite its $10,000 annual salary.

=== Partnership with Thad Jones ===
He later became a founding member of the Thad Jones/Mel Lewis Big Band, with whom he played from 1965 to 1976, and thereafter continued to record Jones's compositions on many of his own albums. Adams co-led a quintet with Donald Byrd from 1958 to 1962, with whom he recorded a live date, 10 to 4 at the 5 Spot (Riverside), featuring Elvin Jones, and a sequence of albums for Blue Note. During this time he also played with the Sal Salvador Big Band at the Diamond Beach Club in Wildwood, New Jersey, in August 1965, along with Teddy Charles in early 1966, and Ella Fitzgerald in 1967. Most of the Thad Jones/Mel Lewis Big Band performances took place at the Village Vanguard in New York City, along with many colleges and other locations around the United States, Europe, and Asia. The 18-year period spent with Thad Jones was filled with almost constant touring when the band was not playing their steady gig at the Village Vanguard. One of the ensemble's most frequent performing locations outside the United States was the Montmartre in Copenhagen, Denmark.

=== Solo career ===
Adams' solo career began in 1977 in California, where he initially stayed with John and Ron Marabuto. He soon played gigs with Mingus, Baker, and Hampton, with whom he went on a two-month European tour in 1978. On March 18, 1978, Adams purchased a new Selmer baritone saxophone that served as his interim back-up instrument for his original saxophone that he had been using since 1948. In 1979, Adams played several gigs with Per Husby across Norway. On June 5, 1980, the Berg Larsen mouthpiece Adams had been using for 32 years finally broke, which led him to replace it with a Dukoff D-5 mouthpiece and a Bari plastic reed. The following day, Adams premiered his new set-up at One Step Down in Washington, D.C.

Adams began composing "Urban Dreams" on July 29, 1980, on a flight to London for a short European tour. Adams finally replaced his original Selmer E-flat 'Balanced Action' baritone saxophone in December 1980 after 31 years of use. In 1981, Adams performed with Rein de Graaff's trio, Per Husby's trio, and the Franco D'Andrea trio for three short European tours. When in New York City, Adams performed at Fat Tuesday's several times during this period of his career, one of which, Conjuration: Fat Tuesday's Session, earned him a Grammy nomination in 1985 for Best Jazz Instrumental Performance as a Soloist. In later years, Adams toured England and continental Europe several times, performing there with local rhythm sections, and he performed with a Count Basie tribute band at the Grande Parade du Jazz in Nice.

=== Leg injury and end of career ===
Adams' life was severely altered by the leg injury he sustained in December 1983, which was caused by his car's parking brake becoming disengaged on his slanted driveway. This led the car to pin Adams up against his garage door, crushing his leg and restricting him to bed rest for the following five months. Despite the long recovery from his injury, Adams began playing again and exhibited his love for performing in October 1984 by flying from New York City all the way to Singapore for a one-night gig, then returning two days later. He eventually regained the strength in his leg to move without the use of a wheelchair or cane in January 1985, after more than a year of recovery.

Adams was a chain smoker for most of his life. While in Sweden in March 1985, he visited a thoracic specialist at the suggestion of a friend, Gunnar Windahl, and was diagnosed with lung cancer. He was hospitalized for testing later that month in New York, then was forced to take a break from performing or traveling for two months that summer in order to undergo radiation treatments.

A benefit concert was held for Adams on September 29, 1985, in New York City that featured Dizzy Gillespie, Frank Foster, Kenny Burrell, Tommy Flanagan, and the Mel Lewis Jazz Orchestra, among others. Despite his various health issues, Adams continued pushing himself professionally, which was exemplified by his stretch in Dublin, Ireland, April 4–6, 1986, when he played five gigs over three days with five different bands.

Adams was diagnosed with pleurisy in April 1986 and died of lung cancer in Brooklyn, New York, on September 10, 1986. His final performance took place on July 2, 1986, at the Spectrum in Montreal as part of the Montreal Jazz Festival. Before counting off the first song, he received a standing ovation from the crowd.

== Style ==
Pepper Adams was in many ways the antithesis of near-contemporary baritone players Gerry Mulligan and Serge Chaloff, who favored melodic cool jazz. In contrast, Adams managed to bring the cumbersome baritone into the blisteringly fast speeds of hard bop. Gary Carner, Adams's biographer, described his style as having "very long, tumbling, double-time melodic lines. And that raw, piercing, bark-like timbre." Adams "succeeded in elevating [the baritone saxophone] to the level of all other solo instruments [with] blinding speed, penetrating timbre, distinctive sound, harmonic ingenuity, precise articulation, confident time-feel, and use of melodic paraphrase".

Throughout his career, Adams consistently chose musical expression over large paychecks, as "[he] repeatedly recalled with great satisfaction his decision to play [in groups focused on musical expression] rather than to change his style to secure better paying jobs with now little-known white musicians". A large part of Adams' appeal was that "[he] had the remarkable ability to blow low with enormous power and swing, becoming a hefty addition to big band reed sections. He also was an equally dominant voice in small groups, adding ferocious excitement and stamina".

Despite his prowess at hard bop, Adams was also adept at ballads and slower numbers. An example is his contribution to the album Chet (1958) including a solo on the bittersweet "Alone Together" that critic Dave Nathan described as "one of the album's high points".

== Awards and honors ==
He won DownBeat's New Star award in 1957 and was named baritone soloist of the year for 1980. Adams was nominated three times for a Grammy Award, including nominations for Best Jazz Instrumental Performance as a Soloist for Reflectory in 1979 and Best Jazz Soloist for The Master.... In the 1975 Playboy magazine annual music poll, he was named an All Star's All-Star. In 1967 Adams received the Talent Deserving of Wider Recognition award from DownBeat. From 1979 to 1982, Adams won the award for best baritone saxophonist from DownBeat's International Jazz Critics' Poll on four consecutive occasions, something Adams attributed to his frequent touring of Europe throughout his career. In December 1982, Adams won the DownBeat Readers' Poll award for the best baritone saxophonist in the world, unseating Gerry Mulligan, who had held that distinction since 1953.

== Discography ==
=== As leader/co-leader ===
- Baritones and French Horns (Prestige, 16rpm LP issue, 1957) with the Prestige All Stars; conventional LP release of session led by Adams as Dakar under John Coltrane's name
- Pepper Adams Quintet (Mode, 1957)
- Critics' Choice (Pacific Jazz, 1957)
- The Cool Sound of Pepper Adams (Regent/Savoy, 1957)
- The Pepper-Knepper Quintet (MetroJazz, 1958) with Jimmy Knepper
- 10 to 4 at the 5 Spot (Riverside, 1958)
- Motor City Scene (Bethlehem, 1960) with Donald Byrd
- Out of This World (Warwick, 1961) with Donald Byrd
- Pepper Adams Plays the Compositions of Charlie Mingus (Workshop Jazz, 1963)
- Mean What You Say (Milestone, 1966) with Thad Jones
- Encounter! (Prestige, 1968)
- Ephemera (Spotlite, 1973)
- Julian (Enja, 1975)
- Twelfth & Pingree (Enja, 1975)
- Baritone Madness (Bee Hive, 1977) with Nick Brignola
- Reflectory (Muse, 1978)
- Be-Bop? (Musica, 1979) with Barry Altschul
- The Master (Muse, 1980)
- Urban Dreams (Palo Alto, 1981)
- California Cookin' (Interplay, 1983)
- Conjuration: Fat Tuesday's Session (Reservoir, 1983)
- Generations (Muse, 1985) with Frank Foster
- The Adams Effect (Uptown, 1985 [1988])

=== As sideman ===
With Gene Ammons

- The Big Sound (Prestige, 1958)
- Groove Blues (Prestige, 1958)
- Blue Gene (Prestige, 1958)

With Chet Baker

- Theme Music from "The James Dean Story" (World Pacific, 1956) – with Bud Shank
- Chet (Riverside, 1959)
- Chet Baker Plays the Best of Lerner and Loewe (Riverside, 1959)

With Donald Byrd

- Byrd in Hand (Blue Note, 1959)
- Off to the Races (Blue Note, 1959)
- At the Half Note Cafe (Blue Note, 1960)
- Chant (Blue Note, 1961)
- Royal Flush (Blue Note, 1961)
- The Cat Walk (Blue Note, 1961)
- The Creeper (Blue Note, 1967)
- Electric Byrd (Blue Note, 1970)

With Hank Crawford

- Double Cross (Atlantic, 1968)
- Mr. Blues Plays Lady Soul (Atlantic, 1969)
- Help Me Make it Through the Night (Kudu, 1972)

With Johnny Hammond

- Wild Horses Rock Steady (Kudu, 1971)
- The Prophet (Kudu, 1972)

With Barry Harris

- Luminescence! (Prestige, 1967)
- Bull's Eye! (Prestige, 1968)

With Elvin Jones

- Poly-Currents (Blue Note, 1969)
- Merry-Go-Round (Blue Note, 1971)

With Quincy Jones

- I/We Had a Ball (Limelight, 1965)
- Gula Matari (CTI, 1970)

With The Thad Jones/ Mel Lewis Orchestra

- Opening Night (Alan Grant Presents, 1966)
- Presenting Thad Jones/Mel Lewis and the Jazz Orchestra (Solid State, 1966)
- Presenting Joe Williams and Thad Jones/Mel Lewis, the Jazz Orchestra (Solid State, 1966)
- Live at the Village Vanguard (Solid State, 1967)
- The Big Band Sound of Thad Jones/Mel Lewis featuring Miss Ruth Brown (Solid State, 1968)
- Monday Night (Solid State, 1968)
- Basle, 1969 (TCB Music, 1969)
- Consummation (Solid State/Blue Note1970)
- Suite for Pops (A&M Horizon, 1972)
- Live in Tokyo (Denon Jazz, 1974)
- Potpourri (Philadelphia International, 1974)
- Thad Jones/Mel Lewis and Manuel De Sica (Pausa, 1974)
- New Life (A&M / Horizon, 1976)
- Thad Jones/Mel Lewis Orchestra with Rhoda Scott (Barclay (France), 1976)
- Live in Munich (Horizon, 1976)
- It Only Happens Every Time (EMI/Inner City, 1977)

With Charles Mingus

- Blues & Roots (Atlantic, 1959)
- The Complete Town Hall Concert (Blue Note, 1962 [1994])

With Blue Mitchell

- A Sure Thing (Blue Note, 1962)
- Boss Horn (Blue Note, 1966)
- Heads Up! (Blue Note, 1967)

With Lee Morgan

- The Cooker (Blue Note, 1957)
- Standards (Blue Note, 1967)

With Duke Pearson

- Dedication! (Prestige, 1970, rec. 1961), issued as Minor Mishap (Black Lion, 1989) under Freddie Hubbard's name
- Honeybuns (Atlantic, 1965)
- Introducing Duke Pearson's Big Band (Blue Note, 1967)
- Now Hear This (Blue Note, 1968)

With Shorty Rogers

- Shorty Rogers Plays Richard Rodgers (RCA Victor, 1957)
- Portrait of Shorty (RCA Victor, 1957)

With others

- Ray Alexander, Cloud Patterns (Nerus, 1983)
- Mose Allison, Hello There, Universe (Atlantic, 1970)
- Walter Bishop Jr., Cubicle (Muse, 1978)
- Joshua Breakstone, Echoes (Contemporary, 1987)
- Ray Bryant, MCMLXX (Atlantic, 1970)
- Richard Davis, Muses for Richard Davis (MPS, 1969)
- Maynard Ferguson, Ridin' High (Enterprise, 1967)
- Don Friedman, Hot Knepper and Pepper (Progressive, 1980)
- Jimmy Forrest, Soul Street (Prestige, 1962)
- Curtis Fuller, Four on the Outside (Timeless, 1978)
- Red Garland, Red's Good Groove (Jazzland, 1962)
- Dizzy Gillespie, Live at the Village Vanguard (Solid State, 1968)
- Bobby Hackett, Creole Cookin' (Verve, 1967)
- Philly Joe Jones, Showcase (Riverside, 1959)
- Stan Kenton, Kenton with Voices (Capitol, 1957)
- Peter Leitch, Exhilaration (Reservoir, 1991)
- Herbie Mann, Our Mann Flute (Atlantic, 1966)
- Arif Mardin, Journey (Atlantic, 1974)
- Howard McGhee, Dusty Blue (Bethlehem, 1960)
- Helen Merrill, Chasin' the Bird (EmArcy, 1979)
- The Mitchells: Red Mitchell, Whitey Mitchell, Blue Mitchell and André Previn, Get Those Elephants Out'a Here (MetroJazz, 1958)
- Hank Mobley, Poppin' (Blue Note, 1957)
- Thelonious Monk, The Thelonious Monk Orchestra at Town Hall (Riverside, 1959)
- Oliver Nelson, More Blues and the Abstract Truth (Impulse!, 1964)
- Houston Person, Blue Odyssey (Prestige, 1968)
- Pony Poindexter, Pony's Express (Epic, 1962)
- A. K. Salim, Pretty for the People (Savoy, 1957)
- Lalo Schifrin, Black Widow (CTI, 1976)
- Ben Sidran, Too Hot to Touch (Windham Hill, 1988)
- Dakota Staton, I Want a Country Man (Groove Merchant, 1973)
- Idrees Sulieman, Roots (New Jazz, 1957) with the Prestige All Stars
- Toots Thielemans, Man Bites Harmonica! (Riverside, 1957)
- Mickey Tucker, Mister Mysterious (Muse, 1978)
- Stanley Turrentine, The Spoiler (Blue Note, 1966)
- Jimmy Witherspoon, Blues for Easy Livers (Prestige, 1965)
- Joe Zawinul, Money in the Pocket (Atlantic, 1967)

=== Live recordings released posthumously ===
- Live in Europe (Marge (F), 1977) with the Georges Arvanitas Trio
- Pepper Adams Live (aka Live Jazz by the Sea) (1977), live in California
- California Cookin' (1983), live in California
