= Easy Walker =

Studio album by Stanley Turrentine
- Released: February 1968
- Recorded: July 8, 1966 (#1–6); July 28, 1967 (#7); June 23, 1969 (#8–11)
- Studios: Van Gelder Studio, Englewood Cliffs, NJ
- Genre: Jazz
- Length: 37:14 original LP; 71:05 CD reissue
- Labels: Blue Note; BST 84268
- Producers: Alfred Lion (#1–7); Francis Wolff (#8–11)

Stanley Turrentine chronology
Rough 'n' Tumble (1966)	Easy Walker (1968)	The Spoiler (1966)

Easy Walker is an album by jazz saxophonist Stanley Turrentine recorded for the Blue Note label in 1966 and performed by Turrentine with McCoy Tyner, Bob Cranshaw and Mickey Roker. One additional track from an unreleased session arranged by Duke Pearson was added to the original CD release and another four bonus tracks recorded in 1969 and originally released on Ain't No Way (LT 1095, 1980) were added to the 1997 CD reissue.

== Reception ==
Professional ratings
Review scores
Source	Rating
Allmusic	4/5 stars

The Allmusic review by Stephen Thomas Erlewine awarded the album 4 stars and states "Easy Walker doesn't offer much challenging material, but it does let the musicians work a good groove, and occasionally showcase their improvisational skills, making it a good, relaxing soul-jazz session". A review of the reissued CD in All About Jazz stated that "Blue Note has thrown in some real bonuses [that] make this CD worth the price of admission at 70 minutes. The 1966 material is good and will surprise few who are familiar with the tenor's Blue Note work... both Tyner and Turrentine attack the songs with their respective signatures and illustrate some of their finest playing of the period. Good stuff".

== Track listing ==
1. "Meat Wave" (Hank Johnson) - 4:45
2. "They All Say I'm the Biggest Fool" (Buddy Johnson) - 7:43
3. "Yours Is My Heart Alone" (Franz Lehár) - 5:07
4. "Easy Walker" (Billy Taylor) - 6:14
5. "What the World Needs Now" (Burt Bacharach, Hal David) - 6:43
6. "Alone Together" (Howard Dietz, Arthur Schwartz) - 5:42

Bonus tracks on CD reissue:

7. "A Foggy Day" (George Gershwin, Ira Gershwin) - 6:25
8. "Stan's Shuffle" (Stanley Turrentine) - 6:58
9. "Watch What Happens" (Norman Gimbel, Michel Legrand) - 5:33
10. "Intermission Walk" (Tommy Turrentine) - 6:42
11. "Wave" (Antônio Carlos Jobim) - 8:13

== Personnel ==
Tracks 1–6

- Stanley Turrentine - tenor saxophone
- McCoy Tyner - piano, electric piano
- Bob Cranshaw - bass
- Mickey Roker - drums

Track 7

- Stanley Turrentine - tenor saxophone
- McCoy Tyner - piano
- Bob Cranshaw - bass
- Ray Lucas - drums

Tracks 8–11

- Stanley Turrentine - tenor saxophone
- McCoy Tyner - piano
- Gene Taylor - bass
- Billy Cobham - drums
