= Merry Ole Soul =

Studio album by Duke Pearson
- Released: 1969
- Recorded: February 25 & August 19, 1969
- Studio: Van Gelder Studio, Englewood Cliffs, New Jersey
- Genre: Jazz, Christmas
- Label: Blue Note
- Producer: Duke Pearson

Duke Pearson chronology
How Insensitive (1969)	Merry Ole Soul (1969)	I Don't Care Who Knows It (1968–70)

Merry Ole Soul is a Christmas album by jazz pianist and arranger Duke Pearson, featuring performances recorded in 1969 and originally released on the Blue Note label.

== Reception ==
The AllMusic review awarded the album 2 out of 5 stars.

Professional ratings
Review scores
Source	Rating
Allmusic	2/5 stars

== Track listing ==
1. "Sleigh Ride" (Leroy Anderson, Mitchell Parish) - 6:25
2. "The Little Drummer Boy" (Katherine K. Davis, Henry Onorati, Harry Simeone) - 5:47
3. "Have Yourself a Merry Little Christmas" (Ralph Blane, Hugh Martin) - 2:00
4. "Jingle Bells" (James Pierpont) - 5:10
5. "Santa Claus Is Coming to Town" (J. Fred Coots, Haven Gillespie) - 4:07
6. "Go Tell It on the Mountain" (Traditional) - 3:44
7. "Wassail Song" (Traditional) - 3:04
8. "Silent Night" (Franz Gruber, Joseph Mohr) - 4:12
9. "O Little Town of Bethlehem" (Phillips Brooks, Lewis Redner) - 1:14

- Recorded at Rudy Van Gelder Studio, Englewood Cliffs, New Jersey, on February 25 (track 1) & August 19 (tracks 2–9), 1969
- A 2004 import CD reissue of the album on Toshiba EMI includes an outtake from the sessions, "Old Fashioned Christmas", as a bonus track.

== Personnel ==
- Duke Pearson - piano, celeste (tracks 1, 3)
- Bob Cranshaw - bass (tracks 1–8)
- Mickey Roker - drums (tracks 1–8)
- Airto Moreira - percussion (tracks 4, 5, & 7)
