= Fancy Free (Donald Byrd album) =

Studio album by Donald Byrd
- Released: December 1969
- Recorded: May 9 & June 6, 1969
- Studios: Van Gelder Studio, Englewood Cliffs, New Jersey
- Genres: Jazz, jazz fusion
- Length: 39:10
- Label: Blue Note
- Producer: Duke Pearson

Donald Byrd chronology
The Creeper (1967)	Fancy Free (1969)	Electric Byrd (1970)

Fancy Free is an album by American jazz trumpeter Donald Byrd, recorded and released in 1969 by Blue Note Records.

== Reception ==
Professional ratings
Review scores
Source	Rating
AllMusic	3/5 stars

AllMusic awarded the album with 3 stars and its review by Steve Huey says, "Recorded just a few months after Miles Davis' In a Silent Way, Fancy Free finds Byrd leading a large ensemble prominently featuring Frank Foster on tenor, Lew Tabackin or Jerry Dodgion on flute, and several percussionists. But the most important piece of the puzzle is Duke Pearson's electric piano, the first time Byrd utilized the instrument." Critic Marc Myers described the album in 2018 as "decades ahead of its time". Myers also wrote that the album began a new period in Byrd's career, in which, "Unlike rock fusion, which was popular with sit-down audiences in college dorm rooms and events, Byrd focused more on grooves and beats, accompanying them on his trumpet rather than being driven by them."

== Track listing ==
1. "Fancy Free" (Donald Byrd) – 12:06
2. "I Love the Girl" (Byrd) – 8:48
3. "The Uptowner" (Mitch Farber) – 9:16
4. "Weasil" (Charles Hendricks) – 9:00

Notes

- Recorded on May 9 (#2, 4) and June 6 (#1, 3) 1969.

== Personnel ==
- Donald Byrd – trumpet
- Julian Priester – trombone
- Frank Foster – tenor and soprano saxophone
- Duke Pearson – electric piano
- Jimmy Ponder – guitar
- Roland Wilson – bass guitar
- Nat Bettis – percussion
- John H. Robinson Jr. – percussion
- Jerry Dodgion (#1, 3) – flute
- Leo Morris (#1, 3) – drums
- Lew Tabackin (#2, 4) – flute
- Joe Chambers (#2, 4) – drums
