= Live at the Half Note =

Live at the Half Note may refer to:

- Live at the Half-Note, a 1964 album by Art Farmer's Quartet
- Live at the Half Note (Lee Konitz album), recorded in 1959, released in 1994
- Live at the Half Note: One Down, One Up, a 2005 compilation of 1965 radio broadcasts from the Half Note Club

== See also ==
- At the Half Note Cafe, a 1960 album by Donald Byrd
- Jazz Alive! A Night at the Half Note, a 1959 album by Zoot Sims, Al Cohn and Phil Woods
