= Lex Humphries =

American jazz drummer (1936–1994)

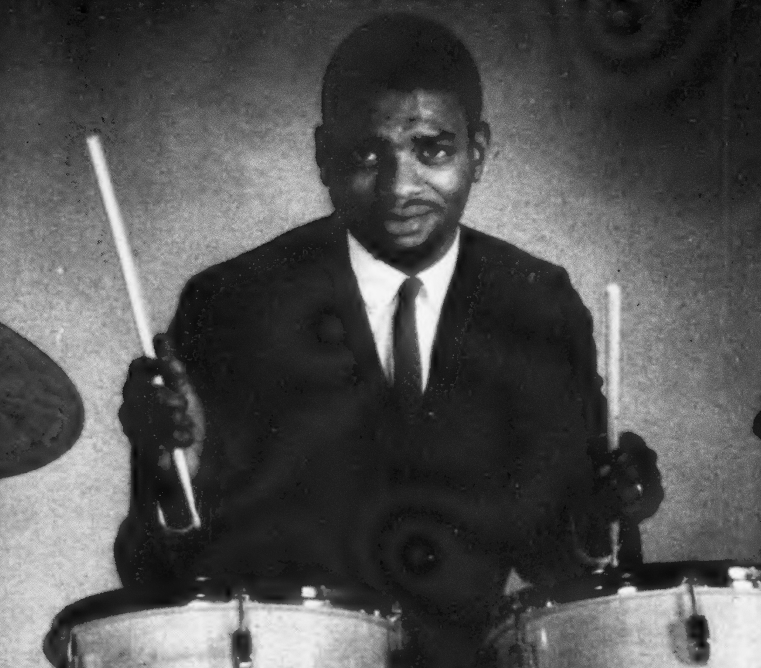
- Humphries in a 1960 advertisement

Background information
- Born: August 22, 1936
- Origin: New York City, US
- Died: July 11, 1994 (aged 57)
- Genre: Jazz
- Occupation: Musician
- Instrument: Drums

Lex Humphries (August 22, 1936 – July 11, 1994) was an American jazz drummer. He worked with two musicians known for mixing world music with jazz: Sun Ra and Yusef Lateef. As a member of Sun Ra's "Arkestra" he appeared in the film Space Is the Place.

Humphries played on the Giant Steps sessions with John Coltrane. The alternate versions of "Giant Steps", "Naima", and "Like Sonny" that he and Cedar Walton recorded with Coltrane were first released in 1974. He was also the first drummer in the Jazztet, appearing on their first album, Meet the Jazztet, in 1960.

He died in Philadelphia in 1994, aged 57. The cause of death was undisclosed, but according to fellow drummer Mickey Roker, he was distraught in his later years due to marital problems and being separated from his son.

== Discography ==
=== As sideman ===
With Donald Byrd

- Fuego (1959)
- Byrd in Flight (1960)
- At the Half Note Cafe (1963)
- A New Perspective (1963)

With John Coltrane

- Alternate Takes
- The Heavyweight Champion: The Complete Atlantic Recordings

With Art Farmer and Benny Golson

- Meet the Jazztet (Argo, 1960)

With Dizzy Gillespie

- The Ebullient Mr. Gillespie (Verve, 1959)
- Have Trumpet, Will Excite! (Verve, 1959)

With John Handy

- No Coast Jazz (Roulette, 1960)

With Freddie Hubbard

- Minor Mishap (Black Lion, 1989)

With Yusef Lateef

- The Three Faces of Yusef Lateef (Riverside, 1960)
- The Centaur and the Phoenix (Riverside, 1960)
- Eastern Sounds (Prestige, 1961)
- Jazz 'Round the World (Impulse!, 1963)

With Junior Mance

- Junior (Verve, 1959)

With Wes Montgomery

- SO Much Guitar! (1961)

With Duke Pearson

- Profile (1959)
- Tender Feelin's (1959)
- Angel Eyes (1961)
- Dedication! (1961)

With Sonny Red

- Images (Jazzland, 1962)

With Sonny Stitt

- Rearin' Back (Argo, 1962)

With Sun Ra

- It's After the End of the World (MPS, 1970)
- Black Myth/Out in Space (Motor Music, 1970 [1998])
- Space Is the Place (soundtrack) (Evidence, 1972 [1993])
- Space Is the Place (Impulse!, 1973)

With Leon Thomas

- Leon Thomas in Berlin (Flying Dutchman, 1971) with Oliver Nelson

With McCoy Tyner

- Nights of Ballads & Blues (1963)

With Doug Watkins

- Soulnik (New Jazz, 1960)
