= The Creeper (album) =

Studio album by Donald Byrd
- Released: 1981
- Recorded: October 5, 1967
- Studio: Van Gelder Studio, Englewood Cliffs, NJ
- Genre: Jazz
- Length: 48:48
- Label: Blue Note; LT 1096
- Producer: Alfred Lion, Duke Pearson, Francis Wolff

Donald Byrd chronology
Slow Drag (1967)	The Creeper (1981)	Fancy Free (1969)

The Creeper is an album by American trumpeter Donald Byrd. Along with Byrd, the album Sonny Red, Pepper Adams, Chick Corea, Miroslav Vitous, and Mickey Roker. It was recorded in October 1967 but not released on the Blue Note label until 1981.

== Reception ==
The AllMusic review by Scott Yanow stated: "For the last time, Byrd was heard in prime form in an acoustic format... although none of the originals caught on as standards (or have been performed since), together as a whole they give one a lot of variety in the then-modern hard bop field. Pity that this album has been out of print since the mid-'80s".

Professional ratings
Review scores
Source	Rating
AllMusic	2.5/5 stars
The Rolling Stone Jazz Record Guide	3/5 stars

== Track listing ==
All compositions by Donald Byrd except as indicated

1. "Samba Yantra" (Chick Corea) – 9:35
2. "I Will Wait for You" (Norman Gimbel, Jacques Demy, Michel Legrand) – 9:05
3. "Blues Medium Rare" – 6:06
4. "The Creeper" (Sonny Red) – 4:38
5. "Chico-San" (Corea) – 6:45
6. "Early Sunday Morning" – 6:18
7. "Blues Well Done" – 6:21

== Personnel ==
- Donald Byrd – trumpet
- Sonny Red – alto saxophone (tracks 1, 3–7)
- Pepper Adams – baritone saxophone (tracks 1, 3–7)
- Chick Corea – piano
- Miroslav Vitouš – bass
- Mickey Roker – drums
