= Prairie Dog (album) =

Studio album by Duke Pearson
- Released: 1966
- Recorded: 1966
- Genre: Soul Jazz, Hard Bop
- Length: 34:41
- Label: Atlantic
- Producer: Joel Dorn

Duke Pearson chronology
Honeybuns (1965)	Prairie Dog (1966)	Sweet Honey Bee (1966)

Prairie Dog is the eighth album by American pianist and arranger Duke Pearson, and his second for the Atlantic label, recorded in 1966.

== Reception ==
The Allmusic review by Thom Jurek awarded the album 3½ stars stating "this is Pearson in full soul-jazz mode, driven deeply by the blues, with an all-star band... This is as fine as any date Pearson released for Atlantic, and grooves all the way through, seamlessly".

Professional ratings
Review scores
Source	Rating
Allmusic	3.5/5 stars
The Penguin Guide to Jazz Recordings	4/4 stars

== Track listing ==
All compositions by Duke Pearson except as indicated

1. "The Fakir" - 5:14
2. "Prairie Dog" - 6:45
3. "Hush-A-Bye" (Sammy Fain, Jerry Seelen) - 4:11
4. "Soulin'" (Joe Henderson) - 6:59
5. "Little Waltz" (Ron Carter) - 6:04
6. "Angel Eyes" (Earl Brent, Matt Dennis) - 5:28

- Recorded in New York City in 1966

== Personnel ==
- Duke Pearson - piano, (trio track 6), celeste, (track 3), arranger
- Johnny Coles - trumpet
- James Spaulding - alto saxophone, flute
- George Coleman - tenor saxophone
- Harold Vick - tenor saxophone, soprano saxophone
- Gene Bertoncini - guitar
- Bob Cranshaw - bass
- Mickey Roker - drums
