= Hush! (Duke Pearson album) =

Studio album by Duke Pearson
- Released: 1962
- Recorded: January 12, 1962
- Studio: Bell Sound (New York City)
- Genre: Jazz
- Label: Jazzline
- Producer: Fred Norsworthy

Duke Pearson chronology
Dedication! (1961)	Hush! (1962)	Wahoo! (1964)

Hush! is the fifth album by American pianist and arranger Duke Pearson recorded in 1962 and released on the short-lived Jazzline label in 1962 as The Duke Pearson Quintet. Hush! features performances by an unusual quintet featuring two trumpeters, Donald Byrd, and Johnny Coles. The album was later reissued on the Polydor label and in 1989 released on CD under Byrd's & Coles' name on the Black Lion label as Groovin' for Nat with additional takes and unissued tracks. It has been subsequently released on other labels, particularly under Donald Byrd's name. It was released on digital media by the Blue Velvet label as "Duke Pearson: Hush", including the bonus tracks, in 2017.

== Reception ==
The Allmusic review awarded the album 4 stars.

Professional ratings
Review scores
Source	Rating
Allmusic	4/5 stars

== Track listing ==
All compositions by Duke Pearson except as indicated

1. "Hush" (Donald Byrd) - 6:07 (take 2)
2. "Child's Play" (Donald Byrd) - 6:40 (take 3)
3. "Angel Eyes" (Matt Dennis, Earl Brent) - 5:58 (take 4)
4. "Smoothie" (Rudy Stevenson) - 5:50 (take 4)
5. "Sudel" - 6:02 (take 2)
6. "Friday's Child" (Paul Mitchell) - 6:26 (take 1)
7. "Out of This World" (Harold Arlen, Johnny Mercer) - 6:40

Groovin' for Nat bonus tracks

1. "Groovin' for Nat" (Ernie Wilkins) - 3:45
2. "Hush" [Take 1] (Donald Byrd) - 7:35 (alternative take bonus track)
3. "Child's Play" [Take 2] (Donald Byrd) - 6:46 (alternative take bonus track)
4. "Sudel" [Take 4] - 6:09 (alternative take bonus track)

All tracks recorded at Bell Sound Studios, New York City on January 12, 1962

== Personnel ==
- Duke Pearson - piano
- Donald Byrd - trumpet (except tracks 3, 7)
- Johnny Coles - trumpet (except tracks 3, 6, 7)
- Bob Cranshaw - bass
- Walter Perkins - drums
