= I Don't Care Who Knows It =

Studio album by Duke Pearson
- Released: 1996
- Recorded: June 24, 1968; May 5, October 3 and November 21, 1969; February 13, 1970
- Studio: Van Gelder (Englewood Cliffs, N.J.) and A & R (New York City)
- Genre: Jazz
- Length: 59:39
- Label: Blue Note

Duke Pearson chronology
| Merry Ole Soul (1969) | I Don't Care Who Knows It (1996) | It Could Only Happen with You (1970) |

I Don't Care Who Knows It is an album by American pianist and arranger Duke Pearson featuring performances recorded between 1968 and 1970. The album was released on the Blue Note label in 1996.

== Reception ==
The Allmusic review by Stephen Thomas Erlewine awarded the album 4 stars stating "the music swings with an understated funk, with the band alternating between standard hard-bop and mellow, soulful grooves. On the whole, I Don't Care Who Knows It is fairly uneven — the sessions don't set well together, but work well as individual sets. Nevertheless, there is enough good material here to make it worthwhile for soul-jazz, Latin-jazz and, especially, Pearson aficionados".

Professional ratings
Review scores
| Source | Rating |
|---|---|
| Allmusic | 4/5 stars |

== Track listing ==
All compositions by Duke Pearson except as indicated

1. "I Don't Care Who Knows It" (Buddy Johnson) – 3:10
2. "Bloos" – 7:38
3. "A Beautiful Friendship" (Donald Kahn, Stanley Styne) – 6:37
4. "Horn In" (Frank Foster) – 5:51
5. "Canto Ossanha" (Baden Powell, Vinicius de Moraes) – 6:36
6. "Xibaba" (Airto Moreira) – 6:32
7. "I Don't Know" (Moreira) – 7:00
8. "Once I Loved (O Amor en Paz)" (Antônio Carlos Jobim) – 5:22
9. "Upa, Neguinho" (Edú Lobo, Gianfrancesco Guarnieri) – 1:57
10. "Captain Bicardi" (Antônio Carlos Jobim) – 5:40
11. "Theme from Rosemary's Baby" (Krzysztof Komeda) – 3:16

- Recorded at Rudy Van Gelder Studio, Englewood Cliffs, NJ on June 24, 1968 (track 11), May 5, 1969 (track 9) and February 13, 1970 (tracks 1–5) and at A & R Studios, New York City on October 3, 1969 (tracks 6 & 8) and November 21, 1969 (tracks 7 & 10).

== Personnel ==
- Duke Pearson – piano, electric piano, arranger
- Burt Collins – trumpet (tracks 1–6 & 8)
- Kenny Rupp – trombone (tracks 1–5)
- Jerry Dodgion – flute, alto flute, alto saxophone (tracks 1–8, 10 & 11)
- Al Gibbons – flute (tracks 6 & 8)
- Lew Tabackin – tenor saxophone, flute (tracks 1–5, 7 & 10)
- Frank Foster – tenor saxophone, alto clarinet (tracks 1–5)
- Bobby Hutcherson – vibes (tracks 6–8, 10 & 11)
- Sam Brown (track 11), Ralph Towner (tracks 7 & 10) – acoustic guitar
- Dorio Ferreira – guitar, percussion (track 9)
- Al Gafa (tracks 6–8 & 10), Wally Richardson (tracks 7 & 10) – guitar
- Bob Cranshaw – bass (tracks 6–8, 10 & 11)
- Ron Carter – bass (tracks 1–5)
- Bebeto Jose Souza – bass (track 9)
- Mickey Roker – drums (tracks 1–8, 10 & 11), percussion (track 9)
- Airto Moreira – percussion, vocals (track 5–8, & 10), drums (track 9)
- Stella Mars – vocals (track 8)
- Andy Bey – vocals (track 1)
- Flora Purim – vocals (track 9)
