= Skylark (Shirley Scott album) =

Live album by Shirley Scott
- Released: 1991
- Recorded: November 22–23, 1991; Birdland, New York City
- Genre: Jazz
- Length: 59:52
- Label: Candid; CCD79705
- Producer: Mark Morganelli, Alan Bates

Shirley Scott chronology
Blues Everywhere (1991)	Skylark (1991)	A Walkin' Thing (1992)

Professional ratings
Review scores
Source	Rating
Allmusic	4/5 stars
The Penguin Guide to Jazz Recordings	3/4 stars

Skylark is a live album by the Shirley Scott Trio recorded in 1991 at Birdland and released on the Candid label.

== Reception ==
The Allmusic site awarded the album 4 stars.

== Track listing ==
1. "Skylark" (Hoagy Carmichael, Johnny Mercer) - 8:21
2. "I Still Want You/You Are My Heart's Delight" (Timothy Carpenter/Ludwig Herzer, Franz Lehár, Fritz Löhner-Beda) - 9:07
3. "All the Things You Are" (Oscar Hammerstein II, Jerome Kern) - 8:45
4. "Alone Together" (Howard Dietz, Arthur Schwartz) - 10:56
5. "Peace" (Horace Silver) - 7:25
6. "McGhee and Me" (Shirley Scott) - 8:54
7. "The Party's Over/The Theme" (Betty Comden, Adolph Green, Jule Styne/Miles Davis) - 6:23

== Personnel ==
- Shirley Scott - piano
- Arthur Harper - bass
- Mickey Roker - drums
