= Oasis (Shirley Scott album) =

Studio album by Shirley Scott
- Released: 1989
- Recorded: August 28, 1989; Fox Recording Studio, Rutherford, New Jersey
- Genre: Jazz
- Label: Muse; MR5388
- Producer: Houston Person

Shirley Scott chronology
One for Me (1974)	Oasis (1989)	Great Scott! (1991)

Professional ratings
Review scores
Source	Rating
Allmusic	4/5 stars

Oasis is an album by organist Shirley Scott recorded in 1989 and released on the Muse label.

== Reception ==
The Allmusic site awarded the album 4 stars stating "Scott is in fine form throughout the album, playing with plenty of warmth and feeling on original material as well as soulful interpretations".

== Track listing ==
All compositions by Shirley Scott except as indicated

1. "Oasis" - 6:53
2. "Lament" (J. J. Johnson) - 7:19
3. "Blues Everywhere" - 8:48 Bonus track on CD
4. "Alone Together" (Howard Dietz, Arthur Schwartz) - 7:08
5. "Basie in Mind" - 7:11
6. "Do You Know a Good Thing When You See One?" - 6:54
7. "Nature Boy" (eden ahbez) - 8:45

== Personnel ==
- Shirley Scott - organ
- Virgil Jones - trumpet (tracks 1–3 & 5–7)
- Charles Davis - tenor saxophone (tracks 1–3 & 5–7)
- Houston Person - tenor saxophone (track 3)
- Arthur Harper - bass
- Mickey Roker - drums
