= Al Gafa =

American jazz musician

Alexander "Al" Gafa (born April 9, 1941, New York City) is an American jazz guitarist.

== Career ==
Gafa worked extensively as a session musician for recordings in the mid and late 1960s in New York. In jazz he worked in that decade with Kai Winding, Michel Legrand, Sam Donahue, Duke Pearson, and Carmen McRae. He worked with McRae until 1971, then played in the 1970s with Dizzy Gillespie, Mike Longo, and Yusef Lateef. Gafa put together his own small groups in the decade; his sidemen included Kenny Barron, Ben Brown, Al Foster, Steve LaSpina, Andy LaVerne, Dave Shapiro, and Richard Wyands. He worked with Johnny Hartman from 1978 to 1982 and in the early 1980s with Susannah McCorkle and Joe Albany, Sammy Davis Jr., Sylvia Syms, Morgana King, Shirley Horn.

== Discography ==
=== As leader ===
- Leblon Beach (Pablo, 1976)

=== As sideman ===
With Dizzy Gillespie

- Dizzy Gillespie, Sonny Stitt Quintet Live in Paris & Copenhagen 1974
- Dizzy Gillespie in Brazil with Trio Mocoto (1974)
- Bahiana (Pablo, 1976)

With Johnny Hartman

- I've Been There (Perception, 1973)
- Once in Every Life (Bee Hive, 1981)

With Mike Longo

- The Awakening (Mainstream, 1972)
- Matrix (Mainstream, 1972)

With Susannah McCorkle

- The People That You Never Get to Love (Inner City, 1981)
- Let's Face to Music (Concord Jazz, 1997)
- From Broken Hearts to Blue Skies (Concord Jazz, 1999)

With Duke Pearson

- The Phantom (Blue Note, 1968)
- How Insensitive (Blue Note, 1969)
- I Don't Care Who Knows It (Blue Note, 1996)

With others

- Joe Albany, Portrait of an Artist (Elektra Musician, 1982)
- Astrud Gilberto, Now (Perception, 1972)
- Shirley Horn, Where Are You Going (Perception, 1973)
- Carmen McRae, Just a Little Lovin (Atlantic, 1970)
- The Monkees, More of the Monkees (Rhino, 1994)
- Joe Newman, Sing to the Lord a New Song
- Paul Simon, There Goes Rhymin' Simon (Columbia, 1973)
- Larry Willis, A New Kind of Soul (1970)
- Kai Winding, Dirty Dog
