= Ethiopian Knights =

Album by Donald Byrd

Studio album by Donald Byrd
- Released: April 1, 1972
- Recorded: August 25, 1971 (#1–2); August 26, 1971 (#3)
- Studios: A&M Studios, Los Angeles
- Genre: Jazz-funk
- Length: 36:33
- Labels: Blue Note; BST 84380
- Producer: George Butler

Donald Byrd chronology
Kofi (1969–70)	Ethiopian Knights (1972)	Black Byrd (1972)

Ethiopian Knights is an album by American trumpeter Donald Byrd featuring performances by Byrd with Thurman Green, Harold Land, Bobby Hutcherson, Joe Sample, and others, recorded for the Blue Note label in 1971.

== Reception ==
The AllMusic review by Steve Huey awarded the album four stars and stated, "Even if it isn't quite as consistent as Kofi and Electric Byrd, Ethiopian Knights is another intriguing transitional effort that deepens the portrait of Byrd the acid jazz legend".

Professional ratings
Review scores
Source	Rating
AllMusic	4/5 stars

== Track listing ==
All compositions by Donald Byrd except as indicated

1. "The Emperor" - 15:14
2. "Jamie" - 3:38
3. "The Little Rasti" - 17:41

== Personnel ==
- Donald Byrd – trumpet
- Thurman Green – trombone
- Harold Land – tenor saxophone
- Bobby Hutcherson – vibes
- Joe Sample – organ
- Bill Henderson III – electric piano
- Don Peake – guitar
- Wilton Felder – electric bass
- Ed Greene – drums
- Bobbye Porter Hall – congas, tambourine
- Greg Poree – guitar (tracks 1–2)
- David T. Walker – guitar (track 3)
