= Introducing Duke Pearson's Big Band =

Studio album by Duke Pearson
- Released: 1968
- Recorded: December 15, 1967 (#1–9); December 3, 1968 (#10–15)
- Studio: Van Gelder Studio, Englewood Cliffs, New Jersey
- Genre: Jazz
- Length: 42:23 original LP
- Label: Blue Note; BST 84276
- Producer: Duke Pearson

Duke Pearson chronology
The Right Touch (1967)	Introducing Duke Pearson's Big Band (1968)	The Phantom (1968)

Introducing Duke Pearson's Big Band is the eleventh album by American pianist and arranger Duke Pearson, featuring big band performances recorded in 1967 and released on the Blue Note label. The album was rereleased with six bonus tracks from Now Hear This, Pearson's 1968 big band recording, on a single CD in 1998.

== Reception ==
The Allmusic review by Stephen Thomas Erlewine awarded the album 4 stars stating, "[Pearson's] originals are continually unpredictable and memorable, and his arrangements, especially of the standards, are provocative and intriguing. While it might not appeal to fans of Pearson's wonderful small-group hard bop sessions, it is unquestionably an experiment that works, and one that confirms his remarkable skills and talents."

Professional ratings
Review scores
Source	Rating
Allmusic	4/5 stars
The Penguin Guide to Jazz Recordings	3/4 stars

== Track listing ==
All compositions by Duke Pearson except where noted

1. "Ground Hog" - 3:06
2. "New Girl" - 6:04
3. "Bedouin" - 5:27
4. "Straight Up and Down" (Chick Corea) - 6:59
5. "Ready When You Are C.B." - 2:56
6. "New Time Shuffle" (Joe Sample) - 5:36
7. "Mississippi Dip" - 2:35
8. "A Taste of Honey" (Bobby Scott, Ric Marlow) - 5:29
9. "Time After Time" (Sammy Cahn, Jule Styne) - 4:11

Bonus tracks on CD reissue: From "Now Hear This" (Blue Note 84308)

10. "Disapproachment" (Frank Foster) - 5:49
11. "Tones for Joan's Bones" (Corea) - 5:33
12. "Minor League" - 6:37
13. "Here's That Rainy Day" (Johnny Burke, Jimmy Van Heusen) - 4:26
14. "Make It Good" - 4:41
15. "Days of Wine and Roses" (Henry Mancini, Johnny Mercer) - 6:01

== Personnel ==
- Duke Pearson - piano, arranger (tracks 1–9 & 11–15)
- Jim Bossy (tracks 10–15), Randy Brecker, Burt Collins, Joe Shepley, Marvin Stamm - trumpet
- Garnett Brown, Jimmy Cleveland (tracks 10–15), Benny Powell, Julian Priester (tracks 1–9) - trombone
- Kenny Rupp - bass trombone
- Jerry Dodgion - alto saxophone, flute, piccolo
- Al Gibbons - alto saxophone, flute, bass clarinet
- Lew Tabackin - tenor saxophone
- Frank Foster - tenor saxophone, arranger (track 10)
- Pepper Adams - baritone saxophone, clarinet
- Bob Cranshaw - bass
- Mickey Roker - drums
