= Angel Eyes (Duke Pearson album) =

Studio album by Duke Pearson
- Released: 1968
- Recorded: Aug 1, 1961, and Jan 12, 1962
- Studio: Bell Sound (New York City)
- Genre: Jazz
- Label: Polydor
- Producer: Alan Bates

Duke Pearson chronology
Tender Feelin's (1959)	Angel Eyes (1968)	Dedication! (1961)

Bags Groove cover

Angel Eyes is the third album by American pianist and arranger Duke Pearson featuring performances by Pearson with Thomas Howard, and Lex Humphries originally recorded in 1961/62 for the Jazzline label but not released until 1968 on the Polydor label. The majority of the tracks (without the title track) were released on CD in 1991 on the Black Lion label as Bags Groove with three additional takes.

== Reception ==
The Allmusic review by Scott Yanow of the Bags' Groove release awarded the album 4 stars and stated "Recommended for straightahead jazz collectors".

Professional ratings
Review scores
Source	Rating
Allmusic	4/5 stars

== Track listing ==
All compositions by Duke Pearson except as indicated.

1. "Bags' Groove" (Milt Jackson) - 5:02
2. "Le Carrousel" - 4:50
3. "Angel Eyes" (Earl Brent, Matt Dennis) - 2:42
4. "I'm an Old Cowhand from the Rio Grande" (Johnny Mercer) - 4:45
5. "Jeannine" - 5:30
6. "Say You're Mine" - 5:30
7. "Exodus" (Ernest Gold) - 5:50
  - Recorded at Bell Sound Studios, NYC on August 1, 1961 (tracks 1, 2 & 4–7) and January 12, 1962 (track 3)

=== Bags Groove bonus tracks ===
1. "I'm an Old Cowhand (From the Rio Grande)" [Take 3] (Mercer) - 4:31
2. "Say You're Mine" [Take 3] - 5:30
3. "Le Carrousel" [Take 2] - 4:14

== Personnel ==
- Duke Pearson - piano
- Bob Cranshaw (track 3), Thomas Howard (tracks 1, 2 & 4–7) - bass
- Lex Humphries (tracks 1, 2 & 4–7), Walter Perkins (track 3) - drums
