= Ben Brown (musician) =

American jazz double-bassist

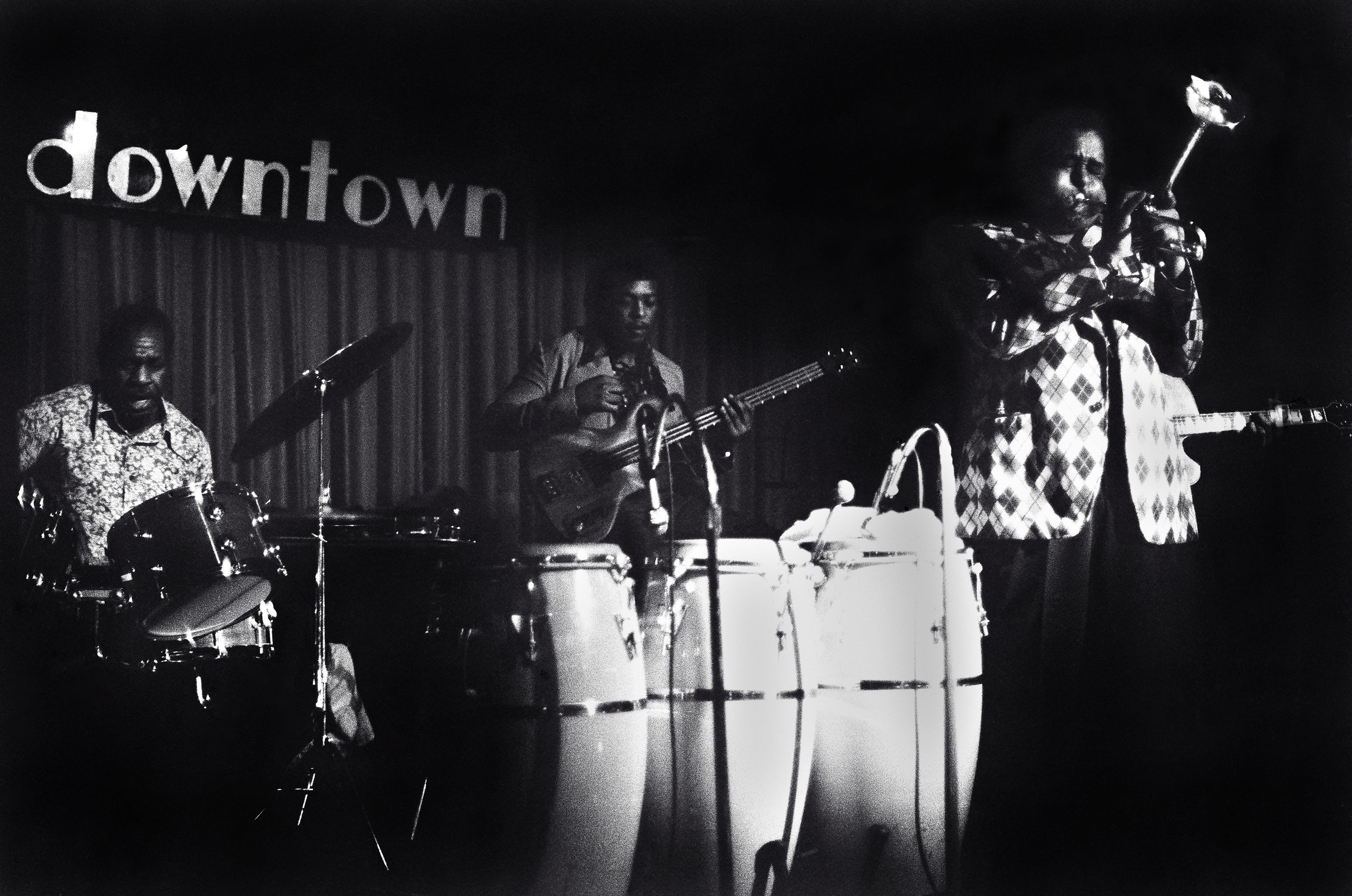
Ben Brown (center) with Mickey Roker (left), Dizzy Gillespie (right), and Rodney Jones (hidden), in Buffalo, New York, 1977

Benjamin Franklin Brown (born August 25, 1952, Opa-Locka, Florida) is an American jazz double-bassist.

Brown grew up in a musical family and initially learned piano before switching to guitar. He played briefly as a guitarist early in his professional career before studying bass formally at Miami Dade Junior College and the University of Miami, graduating in 1974. While a student, he played in the Miami Philharmonic Orchestra and was the bassist in the house band for a Miami jazz club, where he played behind touring musicians such as Mose Allison, Barney Kessel, and Sonny Stitt. After he finished his degree he worked with Al Gafa, Lou Rawls, Buddy Rich, Dizzy Gillespie, and Al Haig. He also began a longtime association with Rodney Jones, with whom he would work into the 1990s. In the early 1980s he played bass for Broadway musicals and played behind Tony Bennett and Lena Horne. In 1985 he began playing with Jimmy Heath; the pair collaborated into the early 1990s. He toured with Gregory Hines in 1987 and worked with Walter Bishop, Jr. near the end of the decade, including on a tour of Japan. He played with the Broadway shows Jelly's Last Jam and Bring in 'da Noise, Bring in 'da Funk in the early 1990s, and played in that decade with Ruth Brown, Al Grey, Harry Edison, Mike Longo, and Carol Sloane.

Brown has also worked as an educator, teaching at Queens College (1995-1997).
