= Slow Drag =

Slow Drag or Slow drag may refer to:

- Slow drag (dance), an American ragtime jazz musical form and a social dance
- Slow Drag (album), by Donald Byrd, 1967
- Alcide Pavageau (1888–1969), American jazz double bassist and guitarist
