= Tender Feelin's =

Studio album by Duke Pearson
- Released: 1960
- Recorded: December 16 and 19, 1959; Van Gelder Studio, Englewood Cliffs, New Jersey
- Genre: Jazz
- Length: 40:30
- Label: Blue Note; BST 84035
- Producer: Alfred Lion

Duke Pearson chronology
Profile (1959)	Tender Feelin's (1960)	Angel Eyes (1961)

Tender Feelin's is the second album by American pianist and arranger Duke Pearson featuring performances originally recorded in 1959 and released on the Blue Note label in 1960.

In the liner notes, producer Alfred Lion recalls the off-the-cuff recording of "3 A.M.": "The session was over, and everybody was ready to pack up and the lights in the studio had been turned off. Then, Duke started to play the blues, with his hat on, and quickly Gene grabbed his bass and Lex got ready. In the control room, we got set, but fast, and this is the result."

== Reception ==
The AllMusic review by Stephen Thomas Erlewine stated: "Tender Feelin's remains a wonderfully understated, romantic mainstream jazz record."

Professional ratings
Review scores
Source	Rating
AllMusic	3/5 stars

== Track listing ==
All compositions by Duke Pearson, except as indicated.

1. "Bluebird of Happiness" (Sandor Harmati, Edward Heyman, Harry Parr-Davies) – 4:19
2. "I'm a Fool to Want You" (Joel Herron, Frank Sinatra, Jack Wolf) – 5:24
3. "I Love You" (Cole Porter) – 4:33
4. "When Sunny Gets Blue" (Marvin Fisher, Jack Segal) – 5:09
5. "The Golden Striker" (John Lewis) – 5:24
6. "On Green Dolphin Street" (Bronislau Kaper, Ned Washington) – 6:46
7. "3 A.M." – 8:55

Recorded December 16 (tracks 6 & 7) and December 19 (tracks 1–5), 1959.

== Personnel ==
- Duke Pearson – piano
- Gene Taylor – bass
- Lex Humphries – drums, tambourine
