= Profile (Duke Pearson album) =

Studio album by Duke Pearson
- Released: 1960
- Recorded: October 25, 1959
- Studio: Van Gelder Studio; Englewood Cliffs, New Jersey
- Genre: Jazz
- Length: 36:36
- Label: Blue Note; BLP 4022
- Producer: Alfred Lion

Duke Pearson chronology
Profile (1960)	Tender Feelin's (1960)

Profile is the debut album by American jazz pianist Duke Pearson, recorded on October 25, 1959 and released on Blue Note the following year. Pearson's trio features rhythm section Gene Taylor and Lex Humphries.

== Background ==
Duke dedicated this album to his mother, Emily Pearson, "the one responsible for my coming this far".

=== Release history ===
Like the following Tender Feelin's, Profile has been released singularly on CD only in Japan by Blue Note/EMI. In May 2011, Fresh Sound reissued the album backed with Tender Feelin's (1960) as Profile & Tender Feelin's – Duke Pearson Trio.

== Reception ==
Professional ratings
Review scores
Source	Rating
AllMusic	3/5 stars
DownBeat	3/5 stars

The AllMusic review awarded the album 3 stars.

== Track listing ==
=== Side 1 ===
1. "Like Someone in Love" (Johnny Burke, Jimmy Van Heusen) – 5:30
2. "Black Coffee" (Sonny Burke, Paul Francis Webster) – 4:32
3. "Taboo" (Margarita Lecuona, Bob Russell) – 4:57
4. "I'm Glad There Is You" (Jimmy Dorsey, Paul Madeira) – 4:52

=== Side 2 ===
1. "Gate City Blues" (Duke Pearson) – 5:09
2. "Two Mile Run" (Pearson) – 5:54
3. "Witchcraft" (Cy Coleman, Carolyn Leigh) – 5:42

== Personnel ==
=== Musicians ===
- Duke Pearson – piano
- Gene Taylor – bass
- Lex Humphries – drums

=== Technical personnel ===
- Alfred Lion – production
- Rudy Van Gelder – recording engineer, mastering
- Reid Miles – design
- Francis Wolff – photography
- Ira Gitler – liner notes
