= Jerry Dodgion =

American jazz saxophonist and flautist (1932–2023)

- Born: August 29, 1932; Richmond, California, U.S.
- Died: February 17, 2023 (aged 90); Queens, New York, U.S.
- Genres: Jazz
- Occupation: Musician
- Instrument(s): Saxophone, flute, clarinet

Jerry Dodgion (August 29, 1932 – February 17, 2023) was an American jazz saxophonist, clarinetist and flautist.

Dodgion was born in Richmond, California. He played alto sax in middle school and began working locally in the San Francisco area in the 1950s. He played in bands with Rudy Salvini, John Coppola/Chuck Travis and Gerald Wilson and worked with the Vernon Alley Quartet, who accompanied Billie Holiday in 1955. He played with Gerald Wilson from 1953 to 1955, Benny Carter in the 1950s, Red Norvo from 1958 to 1961, Benny Goodman (for his 1962 tour of the Soviet Union), Oliver Nelson, Thad Jones and Mel Lewis (from 1965-1979), Herbie Hancock, Duke Pearson, Blue Mitchell, Count Basie, and Marian McPartland. Dodgion was married to drummer/singer Dottie Dodgion for 20 years.

Dodgion had a long career as a sideman, recording up to 2004 only two dates as leader or co-leader: two tracks in 1955 for Fantasy Records with Sonny Clark on piano and an album in 1958 for World Pacific with Charlie Mariano. Dodgion's first true release as a bandleader was issued in 2004 with an ensemble called The Joy of Sax, featuring saxophonists Frank Wess, Brad Leali, Dan Block and Jay Brandford, pianist Mike LeDonne, bassist Dennis Irwin and percussionist Joe Farnsworth.

Dodgion died from complications of an infection in Queens, New York, on February 17, 2023, at the age of 90.

== Discography ==
=== As leader ===
- Modern Music From San Francisco (Fantasy, 1955) – 2 tracks on shared album; 2 more tracks featuring Dodgion led by Vince Guaraldi
- Beauties Of 1918/Something for Both Ears (World Pacific, 1957 [1958]) – co-led with Charlie Mariano

=== As sideman ===
With Louis Armstrong

- Louis Armstrong and His Friends (Flying Dutchman/Amsterdam, 1970)

With the Count Basie Orchestra

- Hollywood...Basie's Way (Command, 1967)
- High Voltage (MPS, 1970)

With Randy Brecker

- Score (Solid State, 1969)

With Donald Byrd

- Electric Byrd (Blue Note, 1970)

With Betty Carter

- The Music Never Stops (Blue Engine, 2019)

With Ron Carter

- Parade (Milestone, 1979)

With Al Cohn

- Jazz Mission to Moscow (Colpix, 1962)

With Tadd Dameron

- The Magic Touch (Riverside, 1962)

With Richard Davis

- Muses for Richard Davis (MPS, 1969)

With Lou Donaldson

- Lush Life (Blue Note, 1967)

With Benny Green

- The Place To Be (Blue Note, 1994)

With Bobby Hackett

- Creole Cookin' (Verve, 1967)

With Johnny Hammond

- The Prophet (Kudu, 1972)

With Herbie Hancock

- Speak Like a Child (Blue Note, 1968)

With Antônio Carlos Jobim

- Stone Flower (CTI, 1970)
- Tide (MCA, 1972)
- Matita Perê (A&M, 1970)

With J. J. Johnson

- J.J.! (RCA Victor, 1964)

With Etta Jones

- From the Heart (Prestige, 1962)

With Quincy Jones

- I/We Had a Ball (Limelight, 1965)

With The Thad Jones/ Mel Lewis Orchestra

- All My Yesterdays (Resonance, 1966)
- Presenting Thad Jones/Mel Lewis and the Jazz Orchestra (Solid State, 1966)
- Presenting Joe Williams and Thad Jones/Mel Lewis, the Jazz Orchestra (Solid State, 1966)
- Live at the Village Vanguard (Solid State, 1967)
- Monday Night (Solid State, 1968)
- Central Park North (Solid State, 1969)
- Basle, 1969 (TCB Music, 1969)
- Consummation (Solid State/Blue Note, 1969)
- Live in Tokyo (Denon Jazz, 1974)
- Potpourri (Philadelphia International, 1974)
- Thad Jones/Mel Lewis and Manuel De Sica and the Jazz Orchestra (PAUSA, 1974)
- Suite for Pops (A&M Horizon, 1975)
- New Life (A&M Horizon, 1976)
- Thad Jones/Mel Lewis Orchestra With Rhoda Scott (Barclay, 1976)
- Live in Munich (A&M Horizon, 1976)
- It Only Happens Every Time (EMI/Inner City, 1977)

With Yusef Lateef

- Part of the Search (Atlantic, 1973)
- In a Temple Garden (CTI, 1979)

With Herbie Mann

- My Kinda Groove (Atlantic, 1965)
- Our Mann Flute (Atlantic, 1966)

With Marian McPartland

- Portrait of Marian McPartland (Concord, 1980)

With Blue Mitchell

- Boss Horn (Blue Note, 1966)
- Heads Up! (album) (Blue Note, 1967)

With Wes Montgomery

- Goin' Out of My Head (Verve, 1966)

With Oliver Nelson

- Happenings with Hank Jones (Impulse!, 1966)
- Encyclopedia of Jazz (Verve, 1966)
- The Sound of Feeling (Verve, 1966)
- The Spirit of '67 with Pee Wee Russell (Impulse!, 1967)

With David "Fathead" Newman

- Scratch My Back (Prestige, 1979)

With Chico O'Farrill

- Nine Flags (Impulse!, 1966)

With Jimmy Owens

- Headin' Home (A&M/Horizon, 1978)

With Duke Pearson

- The Right Touch (Blue Note, 1966)
- Introducing Duke Pearson's Big Band (Blue Note, 1967)
- The Phantom (Blue Note, 1968)
- Now Hear This (Blue Note, 1969)
- I Don't Care Who Knows It (Blue Note, 1970)
- It Could Only Happen with You (Blue Note, 1970)

With Lalo Schifrin

- Black Widow (CTI, 1976)

With Shirley Scott

- Roll 'Em: Shirley Scott Plays the Big Bands (Impulse!, 1966)

With Jack Sheldon

- Playing for Change (Uptown, 1986 [1997])

With Dinah Shore and Red Norvo

- Dinah Sings Some Blues with Red (Capitol, 1960)

With Jimmy Smith

- Any Number Can Win (Verve, 1963)
- Hoochie Coochie Man (Verve, 1966)

With Jimmy Smith and Wes Montgomery

- Jimmy & Wes: The Dynamic Duo (Verve, 1967)

With Dakota Staton

- I Want a Country Man (Groove Merchant, 1973)

With Sonny Stitt

- I Keep Comin' Back! (Roulette, 1966)

With Cal Tjader

- Soul Burst (Verve, 1966)

With Stanley Turrentine

- A Bluish Bag (Blue Note, 1967)
- Don't Mess with Mister T. (CTI, 1973)

With Grover Washington, Jr.

- Mister Magic (Kudu, 1975)

With Gerald Wilson

- New York, New Sound (Mack Avenue, 2003)
- In My Time (Mack Avenue, 2005)

With Kai Winding

- Penny Lane & Time (Verve, 1967)

With Phil Woods

- Round Trip (Verve, 1969)
