= This Game of Love =

Studio album by Vic Damone
- Released: November 1959
- Genre: Traditional pop, vocal pop
- Length: 35:08
- Label: Columbia
- Producer: Robert Smale

Vic Damone chronology
Closer Than a Kiss (1958)	This Game of Love (1959)	On the Swingin' Side (1960)

This Game of Love is the eleventh studio album by American singer Vic Damone, released in November 1959 by Columbia Records. and was available both in stereo and mono. It was produced by Robert Smale.

It features a collection of ballads from the orchestra of Robert Smale, such as "Alone Together", "Ain't Misbehavin'", "Me and My Shadows", and "A Fellow Needs a Girl".

The album was released on compact disc by Sony Music Distribution on March 9, 1997, as tracks 13 through 24 on a pairing of two albums on one CD with tracks 1 through 12 consisting of Damone's 1958 album, Closer Than a Kiss.

In 2007, Collectables included this CD in a box set entitled Only the Best of Vic Damone, which contains six of his studio albums and one compilation. This Game of Love was included in a box set entitled Seven Classic Albums Box Set, which contains all 7 of his studio albums, and was released on February 5, 2016.

== Critical reception ==
Professional ratings
Review scores
Source	Rating
AllMusic	4.5/5 stars
Billboard	4/5 stars
The Encyclopedia of Popular Music	3/5 stars
Disc	5/5 stars

Nick Dedina of AllMusic described the album as "the best album that Damone ever cut", and noted "Damone recorded the session with a small but superb jazz group that gives diverse backings to a strong selection of ballads and rhythm tunes."

Giving it four stars to indicate "strong sales potential", Billboard noted: "Damone gives out with highly listenable renditions of a flock of romantically styled standards."

Cashbox described the album as ”a beautiful love mood expressions", and stated that "A dozen sensitive love songs are expressively conveyed by the singer in warm and tender interpretations."

Ken Graham of Disc identified the album as a "Album of The Month" in its review from February 1960, stating that the album "features nicely balanced selection of material covering quite a range of song styles," giving it a five-star rating.

== Track listing ==
=== Side one ===
No.	Title	Writer(s)	Length
1.	"Alone Together" (from the Broadway musical: Flying Colors)	Arthur Schwartz, Howard Dietz	1:57
2.	"My Romance" (from the Broadway musical: Jumbo)	Richard Rodgers, Lorenz Hart	2:18
3.	"Ain't Misbehavin'" (from the Broadway musical: Connie's Hot Chocolates)	Andy Razaf, Fats Waller, Harry Brooks	4:47
4.	"But Beautiful"	Jimmy Van Heusen, Johnny Burke	3:27
5.	"The End of a Love Affair" (from the Broadway musical: Three Twins)	Edward C. Redding,	3:16
6.	"The Things We Did Last Summer"	Sammy Cahn, Jule Styne	2:52

=== Side two ===
No.	Title	Writer(s)	Length
1.	"Am I Blue?" (from the Warner Bros. Pictures film: On with the Show!)	Harry Akst, Grant Clarke	2:24
2.	"I'll Be Around"	Alec Wilder	3:35
3.	"It's a Lonesome Old Town"	Harry Tobias, Charles Kisco	2:59
4.	"Me and My Shadow"	Al Jolson, Billy Rose, Dave Dreyer	2:29
5.	"I Like the Likes of You"	Vernon Duke, E. Y. Harburg	2:50
6.	"A Fellow Needs a Girl" (from the Broadway musical: Allegro)	Richard Rodgers, Oscar Hammerstein II	2:35
