= Billie Poole =

American singer

- Born: Lucille Poole; March 21, 1929; Edwardsville, Illinois, U.S.
- Died: May 21, 2005 (aged 76) Oakland, California, U.S.
- Genres: Jazz, blues
- Occupation: Singer

Lucille "Billie" Poole (March 21, 1929 – May 21, 2005) was an American jazz and blues singer.

== Life and career ==
Born in Edwardsville, Illinois, Billie Poole moved to California with her family in 1943, where she founded choirs. She had performances with them in numerous concerts around San Francisco. In 1954 she went to France and acted in the German/French movie "The heroes are tired/Les héros sont fatigués". Besides she sang spirituals and Jazz. In 1959 she made recordings with Art Simmons, supported by Clark Terry, Elek Bacsik, Michel Gaudry and Kenny Clarke. Through 1960 she appeared regularly on a French TV series 'Jazz Memories'. On 30 August 1961 she had a live TV-appearance in the German programme Jazz gehört und gesehen (Jazz for listeners and viewers) hosted by Joachim-Ernst Behrendt). alongside Humphrey Lyttelton and Eric Dolphy

After an appearance in Cologne in that year, a recording with the Kenny Clarke/Francy Boland Big Band was planned, and resulted in a single, but had to be cancelled as Poole needed to return to the US.
In 1962 her first album Sermonette for Riverside was published. She sang with pianist Jimmy Jones and orchestra. Her second album Confessin' the Blues (1963) featured Junior Mance, Kenny Burrell, Bob Cranshaw and Mickey Roker).

In 1968/69 Billie Poole was back in France and performed with Memphis Slim. In her last years she sang with her half-sister Betty Gadling, who led a choir called Allen Temple Baptist Church Mass Choir (Hand in Hand).

== Discography ==
- Sermonette (with Jimmy Jones & Orchestra, 1961–62)
- Confessin' the Blues (with Junior Mance, Kenny Burrell, Bob Cranshaw and Mickey Roker, 1963)
