= Virtuoso No. 3 =

Studio album by Joe Pass
- Released: 1977
- Recorded: May 27 & June 1, 1977
- Studio: Group lV Recording, Hollywood
- Genre: Jazz
- Length: 56:06
- Label: Pablo
- Producer: Norman Granz

Joe Pass chronology
Montreux '77 – Live (1977)	Virtuoso No. 3 (1977)	Tudo Bem! (1978)

Alternative Cover
- Reissue cover

Virtuoso No. 3 is a 1977 album by American jazz guitarist Joe Pass. It was re-issued in 1992 on CD by Original Jazz Classics.

Virtuoso No. 3 differs from Virtuoso and Virtuoso No. 2 in that it contains all original material instead of jazz standards. The track "Paco de Lucia" is named after the noted flamenco composer and guitarist.

== Reception ==
Professional ratings
Review scores
Source	Rating
AllMusic	3/5 stars
The Penguin Guide to Jazz Recordings	3/4 stars
The Rolling Stone Jazz Record Guide	4/5 stars

In his AllMusic review, critic Scott Yanow wrote: "There are more ballads than usual in a Pass solo showcase, but there is enough variety to hold one's interest..."

== Track listing ==
All songs by Joe Pass.

1. "Off Beat" – 4:47
2. "Trinidad" – 6:11
3. "Nina's Blues" – 5:15
4. "Sevenths" – 4:12
5. "Ninths" – 5:21
6. "Dissonance, No. 1" – 1:53
7. "Minor Detail" – 6:01
8. "Paco de Lucia" – 5:52
9. "Sultry" – 4:25
10. "Passanova" – 4:29
11. "Pasta Blues" – 4:36
12. "Dissonance, No. 2" – 3:04

== Personnel ==
- Joe Pass - guitar
- Norman Granz – producer
- Val Valentin – engineer
