= Honeybuns =

Studio album by Duke Pearson
- Released: 1966
- Recorded: May 25 & 26, 1965
- Genre: Jazz
- Length: 30:50
- Label: Atlantic
- Producer: Joel Dorn

Duke Pearson chronology
Wahoo! (1964)	Honeybuns (1966)	Prairie Dog (1966)

Honeybuns is the seventh album by American pianist and arranger Duke Pearson featuring performances by Pearson's nonet recorded in 1965 and released on the Atlantic label in 1966.

== Track listing ==
All compositions by Duke Pearson except as indicated

1. "Honeybuns" - 7:07
2. "New Girl" - 5:15
3. "You Know I Care" - 4:08
4. "Is That So?" - 4:15
5. "Our Love" (Buddy Bernier, Larry Clinton, Bob Emmerich) - 4:07
6. "Heavy Legs" - 5:58

- Recorded in New York City on May 25 & 26, 1965

== Personnel ==
- Duke Pearson - piano, arranger
- Johnny Coles - trumpet
- Garnett Brown - trombone
- Les Spann - flute
- James Spaulding - alto saxophone
- George Coleman - tenor saxophone
- Pepper Adams - baritone saxophone, clarinet
- Bob Cranshaw - bass
- Mickey Roker - drums
