= Rough 'n' Tumble =

Studio album by Stanley Turrentine
- Released: October 1966
- Recorded: July 1, 1966
- Studio: Van Gelder Studio, Englewood Cliffs, NJ
- Genre: Jazz
- Length: 37:09
- Label: Blue Note
- Producer: Alfred Lion

Stanley Turrentine chronology
Let It Go (1966)	Rough 'n' Tumble (1966)	Easy Walker (1966)

Rough 'n' Tumble is an album by jazz saxophonist Stanley Turrentine issued in 1966 on Blue Note Records. The album reached No. 20 on the Billboard Top Soul Albums chart.

== Overview ==
Rough and Tumble was produced by Alfred Lion and arranged by Duke Pearson. Artists such as Blue Mitchell, James Spaulding, Pepper Adams, McCoy Tyner, Grant Green, Bob Cranshaw, and Mickey Roker performed upon the album.

== Reception ==
Professional ratings
Review scores
Source	Rating
Allmusic	3/5 stars
The Penguin Guide to Jazz Recordings	3/4 stars

The Allmusic review by Jason Elias awarded the album 3 stars and states "the star of the show is Turrentine, and his warmth and playing make this a necessity, especially for fans '60s pre-funk Blue Note jazz".

== Track listing ==
1. "And Satisfy" (Ronnell Bright) - 6:48
2. "What Could I Do Without You" (Ray Charles) - 4:35
3. "Feeling Good" (Newley, Bricusse) - 7:15
4. "Shake" (Sam Cooke) - 5:55
5. "Walk On By" (Bacharach, David) - 5:57
6. "Baptismal" (John Hines) - 6:39

== Personnel ==
- Stanley Turrentine - tenor saxophone
- Blue Mitchell - trumpet
- James Spaulding - alto saxophone
- Pepper Adams - baritone saxophone
- McCoy Tyner - piano
- Grant Green - guitar
- Bob Cranshaw - bass, electric bass
- Mickey Roker - drums
- Duke Pearson - arranger

=== Production ===
- Alfred Lion - producer
- Rudy Van Gelder - engineer

== Charts ==
Chart performance for Rough 'n' Tumble
Chart (2022)	Peak position
German Albums (Offizielle Top 100)	53
