= Tudo Bem! =

Studio album by Joe Pass and Paulinho da Costa
- Released: 1978
- Recorded: May 8, 1978
- Studio: Hollywood
- Genre: Jazz
- Length: 51:41
- Label: Pablo
- Producer: Norman Granz

Joe Pass chronology
Virtuoso No. 3 (1977)	Tudo Bem! (1978)	Chops (1979)

Tudo Bem! is an album by American jazz guitarist Joe Pass and percussionist Paulinho da Costa that was released in 1978.

"I Live to Love" is a duet with Brazilian guitarist Oscar Castro-Neves.

== Reception ==
Professional ratings
Review scores
Source	Rating
AllMusic	4/5 stars
The Rolling Stone Jazz Record Guide	3/5 stars
The Penguin Guide to Jazz	2.5/4 stars

Writing for AllMusic, music critic Scott Yanow wrote of the album: "Pass plays warm solos on a variety of Brazilian tunes. Highlights include three songs by Antônio Carlos Jobim (including 'Corcovado' and 'Wave'), Deodato's 'Tears,' and Luiz Bonfa's 'The Gentle Rain.' A melodic and infectious date".

== Track listing ==
1. "Corcovado" (Antônio Carlos Jobim, Vinicius de Moraes) – 6:20
2. "Tears (Razao de Viver)" (Eumir Deodato, Paulo Sérgio Valle) – 3:32
3. "Wave" (Jobim) – 10:08
4. "Voce (You)" (Ronaldo Bôscoli, Roberto Menescal) – 3:10
5. "If You Went Away" (Marcos Valle) – 3:04
6. "Que Que Ha?" (Octavio Bailly, Jr., Don Grusin) – 6:50
7. "The Gentle Rain (Chuva Delicada)" (Luiz Bonfá, Matt Dubey) – 4:11
8. "Barquinho" (Bôscoli, Menescal) – 6:11
9. "Luciana" (de Moraes, Jobim, Gene Lees) – 4:55
10. "I Live to Love" (Oscar Castro-Neves, Luverci Fiorini, Ray Gilbert) – 3:20

== Personnel ==
- Joe Pass – guitar
- Paulinho da Costa – percussion
- Octavio Bailly, Jr. – bass
- Oscar Castro-Neves – guitar on "I Live to Love"
- Don Grusin – keyboards
- Claudio Slon – drums

Production notes

- Norman Granz – producer
- Val Valentin – engineer
