= Blackjack (Donald Byrd album) =

Studio album by Donald Byrd
- Released: March 1968
- Recorded: January 9, 1967; May 27, 1963 (Bonus track)
- Studio: Van Gelder Studio, Englewood Cliffs, NJ
- Genre: Jazz
- Length: 40:36
- Label: Blue Note; BLP 4259; BST 84259
- Producer: Alfred Lion

Donald Byrd chronology
Mustang! (1966)	Blackjack (1968)	Slow Drag (1967)

Blackjack is an album by American trumpeter Donald Byrd featuring performances by Byrd with Sonny Red, Hank Mobley, Cedar Walton, Walter Booker, and Billy Higgins recorded in 1967 and released on the Blue Note label as BLP 4259. The CD reissue included one bonus track recorded in 1963. The title track was sampled by Gang Starr & Dream Warriors in their 1991 collaboration "I've Lost My Ignorance".

== Reception ==
The Allmusic review by Scott Yanow awarded the album 3 stars and stated "One can sense that Byrd wanted to break through the boundaries and rules of hard bop but had not yet decided on his future directions".

Professional ratings
Review scores
Source	Rating
Allmusic	3/5 stars

== Track listing ==
All compositions by Donald Byrd except as indicated

1. "Blackjack" - 6:16
2. "West of Pecos" (Sonny Red) - 5:29
3. "Loki" (Red) - 5:53
4. "Eldorado" (Mitch Farber) - 8:00
5. "Beale Street" (Red) - 5:25
6. "Pentatonic" - 4:59
7. "All Members" (Heath) - 4:34 Bonus track on CD reissue

Recorded on May 27, 1963 (track 7) & January 9, 1967 (tracks 1–6).

== Personnel ==
Tracks 1–6

- Donald Byrd - trumpet
- Sonny Red - alto saxophone
- Hank Mobley - tenor saxophone
- Cedar Walton - piano
- Walter Booker - bass
- Billy Higgins - drums

Track 7

- Donald Byrd - trumpet
- Sonny Red - alto saxophone
- Jimmy Heath - tenor saxophone
- Herbie Hancock - piano
- Eddie Khan - bass
- Albert Heath - drums
