= Byrd in Flight =

Studio album by Donald Byrd
- Released: December 1960; 1993 (CD in Japan)
- Recorded: January 17, 1960 (#3, 9); January 25, 1960 (#1, 4, 7–8); July 10, 1960 (#2, 5–6)
- Studio: Van Gelder Studio, Englewood Cliffs
- Genre: Jazz
- Length: 39:51 original LP; 58:06 CD reissue
- Label: Blue Note; BLP 4048; TOCJ-4048 (CD)
- Producer: Alfred Lion

Donald Byrd chronology
Fuego (1959)	Byrd in Flight (1960)	At the Half Note Cafe (1960)

Byrd in Flight is an album by American trumpeter Donald Byrd recorded in 1960 and released on the Blue Note label as BLP 4048 and BST 84048 featuring Byrd with Jackie McLean or Hank Mobley, Duke Pearson, Doug Watkins or Reggie Workman, and Lex Humphries.

== Reception ==
The Allmusic review by Michael G. Nastos awarded the album 4 stars and stated "By the time of this fourth Blue Note album by trumpeter Donald Byrd, it became clear that his playing was becoming stronger with the passing of time".

Professional ratings
Review scores
Source	Rating
Allmusic	4/5 stars

== Track listing ==
All compositions by Donald Byrd except as indicated

1. "Ghana" - 7:20
2. "Little Girl Blue" (Richard Rodgers, Lorenz Hart) - 7:28 mistitled Little Boy Blue
3. "Gate City" (Duke Pearson) - 5:04
4. "Lex" - 7:37
5. "Bo" (Pearson) - 6:34
6. "My Girl Shirl" (Pearson) - 5:48

Bonus tracks on CD release (1996)

7. "Child's Play" (Byrd, Pearson) - 6:56
8. "Carol" - 5:42
9. "Soulful Kiddy" - 5:37

== Personnel ==
- Donald Byrd - trumpet
- Jackie McLean - alto saxophone (tracks 5–6)
- Hank Mobley - tenor saxophone (tracks 1, 3, 4 & 7–9)
- Duke Pearson - piano
- Doug Watkins (tracks 1, 3, 4 & 7–9), Reggie Workman (tracks 2, 5–6) - bass
- Lex Humphries - drums
