= Kofi (album) =

Studio album by Donald Byrd
- Released: February 24, 1995
- Recorded: December 16, 1969 (#1–2); December 4, 1970 (#3–5)
- Studios: A&R Studios, New York City
- Genre: Jazz
- Length: 33:40 (original LP)
- Labels: Blue Note; Blue Note 31875
- Producer: Duke Pearson

Donald Byrd chronology
Electric Byrd (1970)	Kofi (1995)	Ethiopian Knights (1971)

Kofi is an album by the American trumpeter Donald Byrd, featuring performances by Byrd with Frank Foster, Lew Tabackin, Duke Pearson, Ron Carter, Bob Cranshaw, Airto Moreira, Wally Richardson, and Mickey Roker, recorded in 1969 and 1970 and released on the Blue Note label in 1995.

== Reception ==
The AllMusic review by Rob Theakston stated: "The playing here is no less than stellar ... The subtle relaxed tones of this album make it truly one of the essential releases in Byrd's catalog".

Professional ratings
Review scores
Source	Rating
AllMusic	4/5 stars
The Penguin Guide to Jazz Recordings	3/4 stars

== Track listing ==
All compositions by Donald Byrd except as indicated

1. "Kofi" - 7:46
2. "Fufu" - 9:39
3. "Perpetual Love" - 7:38
4. "Elmina" - 8:37
5. "The Loud Minority" (Frank Foster) - 9:57 Bonus track on the CD

== Personnel ==
- Donald Byrd - trumpet
- William Campbell - trombone (track 1)
- Frank Foster - tenor saxophone
- Lew Tabackin - tenor saxophone, flute (tracks 1–2)
- Duke Pearson - electric piano
- Wally Richardson - guitar (tracks 3–5)
- Ron Carter - bass
- Bob Cranshaw - electric bass (track 2)
- Airto Moreira - drums (tracks 1–2), percussion (tracks 3–5)
- Mickey Roker - drums (tracks 3–5)
- Dom Um Romão - percussion (tracks 3–5)

== Covers ==
In 2013, the German House/Techno DJ SCNTST remixed "Kofi" and renamed it "Mind What".
