= Blues Everywhere =

Live album by Shirley Scott
- Released: 1991
- Recorded: November 22, 1991; Birdland, New York City
- Genre: Jazz
- Label: Candid; CCD79525
- Producer: Mark Morganelli

Shirley Scott chronology
Great Scott! (1991)	Blues Everywhere (1991)	Skylark (1991)

Blues Everywhere is a live album by Shirley Scott recorded in 1991 at Birdland and released on the Candid label.

== Reception ==
Professional ratings
Review scores
Source	Rating
Allmusic	4/5 stars
The Penguin Guide to Jazz Recordings	3/4 stars

Allmusic awarded the album 4 stars with reviewer, Michael Erlewine, stating "The twist is that Scott is playing acoustic piano throughout. It's not the usual sound, but she can play that thing".

== Track listing ==
All compositions by Shirley Scott except as indicated

1. "Autumn Leaves" (Joseph Kosma, Johnny Mercer, Jacques Prévert) - 6:16
2. "Blues Everywhere" - 9:09
3. "Oasis" - 8:41
4. "Embraceable You" (George Gershwin, Ira Gershwin) - 9:16
5. "Triste" (Antônio Carlos Jobim) - 8:55
6. "'Round Midnight" (Thelonious Monk) - 8:58
7. "The Theme" (Miles Davis) - 6:06

== Personnel ==
- Shirley Scott - piano
- Arthur Harper - bass
- Mickey Roker - drums
