= A Walkin' Thing =

Studio album by Shirley Scott
- Released: 1992
- Recorded: November 17, 1992; Van Gelder Studio, Englewood Cliffs, New Jersey
- Genre: Jazz
- Length: 44:36
- Label: Candid; CCD79719
- Producer: Maxine Gordon

Shirley Scott chronology
Skylark (1991)	A Walkin' Thing (1992)	Rencontres du Cloítre, Vol. 1 (1996)

Professional ratings
Review scores
Source	Rating
Allmusic	4/5 stars
The Penguin Guide to Jazz Recordings	3/4 stars

A Walkin' Thing is the final studio album by organist Shirley Scott recorded in 1992 at Van Gelder Studio and released on the Candid label.

== Reception ==
The Allmusic site awarded the album 4 stars stating "One of Shirley Scott's last viable recordings before she passed away is a sweet, delicious collection of jazz standards and originals with a fresh-faced group that the organist was happy she was able to present, if the music is any indication ... On this solid top-to-bottom recording, and one of her better contemporary efforts, Shirley Scott carries on fine and mellow, emphasizing her strengths and letting her very capable band do the work while she lingers in her own serene, soulful way".

== Track listing ==
1. "Carnival (Panamanian Independence Song)" (Traditional) - 4:07
2. "D.T. Blues" (Terell Stafford) - 6:06
3. "A Walkin' Thing" (Benny Carter) - 10:43
4. "When a Man Loves a Woman" (Calvin Lewis, Andrew Wright) - 3:51
5. "What Makes Harold Sing?" (Shirley Scott) - 4:12
6. "Shades of Bu" (Tim Warfield) - 6:51
7. "How Am I to Know?" (Jack King, Dorothy Parker) - 8:36
8. "Remember" (Irving Berlin) - 9:09

== Personnel ==
- Shirley Scott - organ
- Terell Stafford - trumpet
- Tim Warfield - tenor saxophone
- Arthur Harper - bass
- Aaron Walker - drums
