= Quadrant (album) =

Studio album by Joe Pass and Milt Jackson
- Released: 1977
- Recorded: February 4, 1977
- Studio: Sun West, Los Angeles
- Genre: Jazz
- Label: Pablo

Joe Pass chronology
Fitzgerald and Pass... Again (1976)	Quadrant (1977)	Montreux '77 – Live (1977)

Professional ratings
Review scores
Source	Rating
AllMusic	4/5 stars

Quadrant is an album by jazz guitarist Joe Pass and vibraphonist Milt Jackson that was released in 1977.

== Track listing ==
1. "Concorde" (Joe Pass) – 4:14
2. "Joe's Tune" (Pass) – 4:28
3. "Oh, Lady be Good!" (George Gershwin, Ira Gershwin) – 7:46
4. "Ray's Tune" (Ray Brown) – 4:36
5. "Grooveyard" (Carl Perkins) – 6:57
6. "The Man I Love" (Gershwin, Gershwin) – 7:47
7. "Blues for the Stone" (Milt Jackson) – 6:16

== Personnel ==
- Joe Pass – guitar
- Milt Jackson – vibes
- Ray Brown – bass
- Mickey Roker – drums

== Chart positions ==
Year	Chart	Position
1979	Billboard Jazz Albums	37
