= Dedication! =

Studio album by Duke Pearson
- Released: 1970
- Recorded: August 2, 1961
- Studio: Bell Sound (New York City)
- Genre: Jazz
- Length: 38:55
- Label: Prestige; PRLP 7729
- Producer: Fred Norsworthy

Duke Pearson chronology
Angel Eyes (1961)	Dedication! (1970)	Hush! (1962)

Dedication! is the fourth album attributed to American pianist and arranger Duke Pearson featuring performances originally recorded in 1961 for the Jazzline label but not released until 1970 on the Prestige label. The Bell Sound Studios recording session was led by the short-lived trombonist Willie Wilson, who died in 1961. The same album was released in 1966 by the Dutch Fontana label as the Freddie Hubbard album Groovy!, by the Japanese Trio label as Freddie Hubbard's Number 5 in 1975, and by the Black Lion label in 1989 as Hubbard's Minor Mishap with alternate takes.

== Reception ==
The Allmusic review by Ronnie D. Lankford Jr. awarded the album 4 stars and stated "Pearson would make a number of other fine recordings for Blue Note during the '60s, but none finer than this one. Dedication! serves as a fine introduction to a talented pianist".

Professional ratings
Review scores
Source	Rating
Allmusic	4/5 stars
The Penguin Guide to Jazz Recordings	3/4 stars

== Track listing ==
All compositions by Duke Pearson, except as indicated

No.	Title	Length
1.	"Minor Mishap" (Tommy Flanagan)	4:27
2.	"Number Five"	3:49
3.	"The Nearness of You" (Hoagy Carmichael, Ned Washington)	5:04
4.	"Apothegm" (Pepper Adams)	5:39
5.	"Lex" (Donald Byrd)	5:51
6.	"Blues for Alvina" (Willie Wilson)	7:14
7.	"Time After Time" (Sammy Cahn, Jule Styne)	6:51

== Personnel ==
- Duke Pearson – piano
- Freddie Hubbard – trumpet
- Willie Wilson – trombone
- Pepper Adams – baritone saxophone
- Thomas Howard – bass
- Lex Humphries – drums
