= A New Perspective =

Studio album by Donald Byrd
- Released: Early February 1964
- Recorded: January 12, 1963
- Studios: Van Gelder Studio, Englewood Cliffs, New Jersey
- Genres: Jazz, hard bop
- Length: 40:37
- Label: Blue Note
- Producer: Alfred Lion

Donald Byrd chronology
Free Form (1962)	A New Perspective (1964)	Up with Donald Byrd (1964)

Professional ratings
Review scores
Source	Rating
AllMusic	5/5 stars
The Penguin Guide to Jazz Recordings	2/4 stars

A New Perspective is a 1964 studio album by jazz trumpeter Donald Byrd. It was released on the Blue Note label as BLP 4124 and BST 84124.

In 2017, it was ranked at number 194 on Pitchfork's list of the "200 Best Albums of the 1960s". The album was remastered by Rudy Van Gelder in 1998.

== Inspiration ==
The album features a fusion of jazz with spirituals, and features a vocal choir singing wordlessly to accompany the instruments.

About the project, Byrd said: "I mean this album seriously. Because of my own background, I've always wanted to write an entire album of spiritual-like pieces. The most accurate way I can describe what we were all trying to do is that this is a modern hymnal. In an earlier period, the New Orleans jazzmen would often play religious music for exactly what it was - but with their own jazz textures and techniques added. Now, as modern jazzmen, we're also approaching this tradition with respect and great pleasure."

== Track listing ==
No.	Title	Writer(s)	Length
1.	"Elijah"	Donald Byrd	9:21
2.	"Beast of Burden"	Donald Byrd	10:07
3.	"Cristo Redentor"	Duke Pearson	5:43
4.	"The Black Disciple"	Donald Byrd	8:12
5.	"Chant"	Duke Pearson	7:31

== Personnel ==
- Donald Byrd – trumpet
- Hank Mobley – tenor saxophone
- Herbie Hancock – piano
- Kenny Burrell – guitar
- Donald Best – vibraphone, vocals
- Butch Warren – bass
- Lex Humphries – drums
- Duke Pearson – arranger
- Coleridge-Taylor Perkinson – choir direction
- Unidentified vocalists: Four men (two basses, two tenors) and four women (two altos, two sopranos)

Technical

- Rudy Van Gelder – recording
- Reid Miles – cover design, cover photography

== Charts ==
Chart	Peak position
US Billboard 200	110
