= Montreux '77 – Live =

Live album by Joe Pass
- Released: 1977
- Recorded: July 15, 1977
- Venue: Montreux Jazz Festival
- Genre: Jazz
- Length: 40:06
- Label: Pablo
- Producer: Norman Granz

Joe Pass chronology
Quadrant (1977)	Montreux '77 – Live (1977)	Virtuoso No. 3 (1977)

Montreux '77 – Live is a live album by American jazz guitarist Joe Pass that was recorded in 1977 at the Montreux Jazz Festival.

== Reception ==
Professional ratings
Review scores
Source	Rating
AllMusic	3/5 stars
The Rolling Stone Jazz Record Guide	3/5 stars
The Penguin Guide to Jazz Recordings	3/4 stars

In his AllMusic review, critic Scott Yanow wrote: "All of Joe Pass' Pablo dates (this one has been reissued on CD via the OJC imprint) are well worth acquiring, but since there are so many others, this one falls just short of being essential."

== Track listing ==
1. "Blues for Yano San" (Joe Pass) – 6:10
2. "Blues for Sitges" (Pass) – 8:55
3. "Blues for Val" (Pass) – 6:05
4. "Wait till You See Her" (Richard Rodgers, Lorenz Hart) – 5:23
5. "She's Funny That Way" (Neil Moret, Richard A. Whiting) – 5:03
6. "Blues for Martin" (Pass) – 4:20
7. "This Masquerade" (Leon Russell) – 5:56

== Personnel ==
- Joe Pass – guitar
