= It Could Only Happen with You =

Studio album by Duke Pearson
- Released: 1974
- Recorded: February 13 & April 10, 1970
- Studio: Van Gelder Studio, Englewood Cliffs, New Jersey
- Genre: Jazz
- Length: 34:07
- Label: Blue Note
- Producer: Duke Pearson

Duke Pearson chronology
I Don't Care Who Knows It (1968–70)	It Could Only Happen with You (1974)

It Could Only Happen with You is the final album by American pianist and arranger Duke Pearson featuring performances recorded in 1970 but not released on the Blue Note label until 1974.

== Reception ==
Professional ratings
Review scores
Source	Rating
AllMusic	4/5 stars

The AllMusic review by Stephen Thomas Erlewine states "Duke Pearson followed the conventions of the time and cut a smooth, commercially-oriented jazz album that made allusions to traditional and contemporary pop, hard bop, soul-jazz and bossa nova... Although the record is a pleasant artifact of its time, it's a rather sad, undistinguished way to close out Pearson's career.

== Track listing ==
1. "Gira, Girou (Round and Round)" (Milton Nascimento) – 7:20
2. "It Could Only Happen with You" (Antônio Carlos Jobim, Louis Oliveira, Ray Gilbert) – 3:35
3. "Book's Bossa" (Walter Booker, Cedar Walton) – 6:35
4. "Hermeto" (Hermeto Pascoal) – 5:35
5. "Lost in the Stars" (Kurt Weill, Maxwell Anderson) – 3:27
6. "Stormy" (Buddy Buie, J. R. Cobb) – 3:35
7. "Emily" (Johnny Mandel, Johnny Mercer) – 4:00
- Recorded at Van Gelder Studio, Englewood Cliffs NJ on February 13 (track 7) & April 10 (tracks 1–6), 1970

== Personnel ==
- Duke Pearson – piano, electric piano
- Burt Collins, Joe Shepley (tracks 1–6) – trumpet
- Kenny Rupp – trombone
- Hermeto Pascoal – flute, guitar, bass (tracks 1–6)
- Theo - guitar, bass (tracks 1–4, 6)
- Jerry Dodgion (track 8). Al Gibbons (tracks 1–7) – alto saxophone, alto flute
- Frank Foster – tenor saxophone (tracks 1–6)
- Lew Tabackin – tenor saxophone, flute (track 7)
- Bob Cranshaw – bass, electric bass (tracks 1–6)
- Ron Carter – bass (track 7)
- Mickey Roker – drums
- Flora Purim – vocals (tracks 1, 2 & 6)
