= Alternate Takes =

Compilation album by John Coltrane
- Released: March 1975
- Recorded: March 26, 1959; May 4–5, 1959; November 24, 1959; October 24, 1960
- Genre: Jazz
- Label: Atlantic
- Producer: Nesuhi Ertegün

Professional ratings
Review scores
Source	Rating
AllMusic	4/5 stars

Alternate Takes is a compilation album credited to jazz musician John Coltrane, released in 1975 on Atlantic Records, catalogue SD 1668. Issued posthumously, it consists of outtakes from recording sessions which yielded the albums Giant Steps, Coltrane Jazz, and Coltrane's Sound. All selections were unreleased at the time.

== Track listing ==
All tracks by John Coltrane except as indicated.

=== Side one ===
1. "Giant Steps" – 3:40
2. "Naima" – 4:27
3. "Like Sonny" – 6:03
4. "Cousin Mary" – 5:54

=== Side two ===
1. "I'll Wait and Pray" (George Treadwell, Jerry Valentine) – 3:25
2. "Countdown" – 4:33
3. "Body and Soul" (Heyman, Sour, Eyton, Green) – 5:59
4. "Syeeda's Song Flute" – 7:02

== Personnel ==
- John Coltrane – tenor saxophone
- Cedar Walton – piano on "Giant Steps," "Naima," "Like Sonny"
- Tommy Flanagan – piano on "Cousin Mary," "Countdown," "Syeeda's Song Flute"
- Wynton Kelly – piano on "I'll Wait and Pray"
- McCoy Tyner – piano on "Body and Soul"
- Paul Chambers – bass on all tracks except "Body and Soul"
- Steve Davis – bass on "Body and Soul"
- Lex Humphries – drums on "Giant Steps," "Naima," "Like Sonny"
- Art Taylor – drums on "Cousin Mary," "Countdown," "Syeeda's Song Flute"
- Jimmy Cobb – drums on "I'll Wait and Pray"
- Elvin Jones – drums on "Body and Soul"
