= Superstition (Shirley Scott album) =

Studio album by Shirley Scott
- Released: 1973
- Recorded: 1973
- Studio: Mediasound, New York City; Chess, Chicago
- Genre: Jazz
- Length: 39:40
- Label: Cadet; CA 50036
- Producer: Esmond Edwards

Shirley Scott chronology
Queen Talk: Live at the Left Bank (2023)	Superstition (1973)	One for Me (1974)

Superstition is an album by organist Shirley Scott recorded in 1973 and released on the Cadet label.

== Track listing ==
All compositions by Shirley Scott except where noted

1. "Hanky's Panky" - 7:49
2. "Lady Madonna" (John Lennon, Paul McCartney) - 6:13
3. "Last Tango in Paris" (Gato Barbieri) - 6:56
4. "Superstition" (Stevie Wonder) - 4:11
5. "People Make The World Go 'Round" (Linda Creed, Thom Bell) - 4:57
6. "Liberation Song" - 4:39
7. "Rainy Days and Mondays Always Get Me Down" (Paul Williams, Roger Nichols) - 4:55

== Personnel ==
- Shirley Scott - organ
- Arthur Hoyle, Murray Watson - trumpet, flugelhorn (tracks 6 & 7)
- Jimmy Owens - trumpet (tracks 1–5)
- Clifford Davis (tracks 6 & 7), Ramon Morris (tracks 1–5) - tenor saxophone
- Jimmy Ponder (tracks 6 & 7), David Spinozza (tracks 1–5) - guitar
- Ron Carter (tracks 6 & 7), Richard Evans (tracks 1–5) - bass
- Grady Tate - drums
- Frederick "Derf" Walker - congas
- Richard Evans - arranger
