= Closer Than a Kiss (Vic Damone album) =

Studio album by Vic Damone
- Released: July 1958
- Genres: Traditional pop, vocal pop, standards
- Length: 40:55
- Label: Columbia
- Producer: Frank De Vol

Vic Damone chronology
Angela Mia (1958)	Closer Than a Kiss (1958)	This Game of Love (1959)

Closer Than a Kiss is the tenth studio album by American singer Vic Damone, released in July 1958 by Columbia Records. and was available both in stereo and mono. It was produced by Frank De Vol.

It features a collection of ballads from the baton of Frank De Vol's Orchestra such as "Day by Day", "As Time Goes By", "Out of Nowhere", and "You and the Night and the Music".

The album was released on compact disc by Sony Music Distribution on March 9, 1997, as tracks 1 through 12 on a pairing of two albums on one CD with tracks 13 through 24 consisting of Damone's 1959 album, This Game of Love.

In 2007, Collectables included this CD in a box set entitled Only the Best of Vic Damone, which contains six of his studio albums and one compilation. Closer Than a Kiss was included in a box set entitled Seven Classic Albums Box Set, which contains all 7 of his studio albums, and was released on February 5, 2016.

== Reception ==
Professional ratings
Review scores
Source	Rating
AllMusic	3/5 stars
The Encyclopedia of Popular Music	4/5 stars
Billboard	4/5 stars

Nick Dedina of AllMusic said the album "showcases Damone's beautiful yet somewhat emotionally empty voice on a respectable but ultimately dull collection of standards."

Giving it four stars to indicate "strong sales potential", Billboard notes "Damone warbles with his usual rich quality an tasteful phrasing on a group of romantic standards."

Cashbox believed that the album was done on "a well-crooned pace" and stated that "Damone treats them warmly, and respectfully".

Variety described the album as "The romantic side of Vic Damone."

Nashville Banner believed "Frank De Vol's orchestrations contribute immensely to a fully enjoyable diso by a singer of sincere offerings and decidedly romantic atmospheres."

Will Friedwald in Stardust Melodies' The Biography of Twelve of America's Most Popular Songs praised Frank De Vol for "one of his finest orchestrations ever credited".

== Track listing ==
=== Side one ===
No.	Title	Writer(s)	Length
1.	"Closer Than a Kiss"	Jimmy Van Heusen, Sammy Cahn	3:07
2.	"Out of Nowhere" (from the Paramount Pictures film: Confessions of a Co-Ed)	Johnny Green, Edward Heyman	3:38
3.	"I Kiss Your Hand, Madame" (from the Deutsche Lichtspiel-Syndikat Pictures film: I Kiss Your Hand, Madame)	Ralph Erwin, Fritz Rotter	3:35
4.	"We Kiss in a Shadow" (from the Broadway musical: The King and I)	Richard Rodgers, Oscar Hammerstein II	3:58
5.	"Cuddle up a Little Closer, Lovey Mine" (from the Broadway musical: Three Twins)	Karl Hoschna, Otto Harbach	3:16
6.	"A Toujours"	Frederick Loewe, Alan Jay Lerner	2:39

=== Side two ===
No.	Title	Writer(s)	Length
1.	"You and the Night and the Music" (from the Broadway musical: Revenge with Music)	Ralph Erwin, Fritz Rotter	3:21
2.	"Prelude to a Kiss"	Duke Ellington, Irving Gordon, Irving Mills	3:23
3.	"How Deep Is the Ocean?"	Irving Berlin	3:58
4.	"Day by Day"	Axel Stordahl, Paul Weston, Sammy Cahn	3:08
5.	"As Time Goes By" (from the Warner Bros. Pictures film: Casablanca)	Herman Hupfeld,	3:33
6.	"Close as Pages in a Book"	Sigmund Romberg, Dorothy Fields	3:14
