= Great Scott! (1991 Shirley Scott album) =

Studio album by Shirley Scott
- Released: 1991
- Recorded: July 7, 1991; Van Gelder Studio, Englewood Cliffs, New Jersey
- Genre: Jazz
- Length: 51:36
- Label: Muse; MR5435
- Producer: Houston Person

Shirley Scott chronology
Oasis (1989)	Great Scott! (1991)	Blues Everywhere (1991)

Professional ratings
Review scores
Source	Rating
Allmusic	3/5 stars

Great Scott! is an album by organist Shirley Scott recorded in 1991 and released on the Muse label.

== Reception ==
The Allmusic site awarded the album 3 stars.

== Track listing ==
All compositions by Shirley Scott except as indicated

1. "Skylark" (Hoagy Carmichael, Johnny Mercer) - 6:56
2. "Triste" (Antônio Carlos Jobim) - 6:22
3. "More Than You Know" (Edward Eliscu, Billy Rose, Vincent Youmans) - 5:32
4. "Blues for Groove" - 5:46
5. "Have You Met Miss Jones?" (Lorenz Hart, Richard Rodgers) - 7:40
6. "I Could Have Told You" (Jimmy Van Heusen, Carl Sigman) - 6:31
7. "Don't Misunderstand" (Charles Trenet, Sigman) - 5:49
8. "Yours Is My Heart Alone" (Ludwig Herzer, Franz Lehár, Beda Fritz Loehner) - 7:00

== Personnel ==
- Shirley Scott - organ
- Buck Hill - tenor saxophone (tracks 3 & 5)
- Arthur Harper - bass
- Mickey Roker - drums
