= The Phantom (album) =

Studio album by Duke Pearson
- Released: 1968
- Recorded: June 24, 1968 (#3); September 11, 1968 (#1–2, 4–6)
- Studio: Van Gelder Studio, Englewood Cliffs, New Jersey
- Genre: Jazz
- Length: 38:36
- Label: Blue Note; BST 84293
- Producer: Francis Wolff

Duke Pearson chronology
Introducing Duke Pearson's Big Band (1967)	The Phantom (1968)	Now Hear This (1968)

The Phantom is the twelfth album by American pianist and arranger Duke Pearson featuring performances recorded in 1968 and released on the Blue Note label.

== Reception ==
The Allmusic review by Stephen Thomas Erlewine awarded the album 3 stars stating "The Phantom finds Pearson writing an ambitious set of post-bop that expands the boundaries of the music with Latin percussion and complex harmonies derived from the avant-garde... The results aren't always successful, but they are intriguing and worth investigating".

Professional ratings
Review scores
Source	Rating
Allmusic	3/5 stars
The Penguin Guide to Jazz Recordings	3/4 stars

== Track listing ==
All compositions by Duke Pearson except as indicated

1. "The Phantom" - 10:21
2. "Blues for Alvina" (Willie Wilson) - 3:09
3. "Bunda Amerela (Little Yellow Streetcar)" - 5:46
4. "Los Ojos Alegres (The Happy Eyes)" - 6:17
5. "Say You're Mine" - 5:40
6. "The Moana Surf" (Jerry Dodgion) - 7:23

== Personnel ==
- Duke Pearson - piano
- Jerry Dodgion - flute, alto flute
- Bobby Hutcherson - vibraphone
- Sam Brown, Al Gafa - guitar
- Bob Cranshaw - bass
- Mickey Roker - drums
- Victor Pantoja - congas
- Carlos 'Patato' Valdés - conga, güiro
