= Sweet Honey Bee =

Studio album by Duke Pearson
- Released: 1967
- Recorded: December 7, 1966
- Studio: Van Gelder Studio, Englewood Cliffs, New Jersey
- Genre: Jazz
- Length: 39:27
- Label: Blue Note; BST 84252
- Producer: Alfred Lion

Duke Pearson chronology
Prairie Dog (1966)	Sweet Honey Bee (1967)	The Right Touch (1967)

Professional ratings
Review scores
Source	Rating
Allmusic	4/5 stars
The Penguin Guide to Jazz	3.5/4 stars

Sweet Honey Bee is an album by American jazz pianist and composer Duke Pearson, released on the Blue Note label in 1967. The woman on the cover was Pearson's fiancee Betty.

== Reception ==
Allmusic awarded the album with 4 stars and its review by Scott Yanow states: "Pianist/composer Duke Pearson leads an all-star group on this run-through of seven of his compositions. The musicians (trumpeter Freddie Hubbard, altoist James Spaulding, Joe Henderson on tenor, bassist Ron Carter, drummer Mickey Roker, and the pianist/leader) are actually more impressive than many of the compositions, although the swinging minor-toned "Big Bertha" deserved to become a standard." The Penguin Guide review says: "the highlights are the lushly voiced melodies of 'Sudel' and 'Gaslight', the former a tune which Pearson had recorded some years earlier with a different group. Hubbard and Henderson eat up their solo opportunities without sundering the essentially easy-going feel which was [a] Pearson trademark, and while not all the material is up to this standard, as a showcase for the pianist as writer and group-leader, this is surely the best thing available at present [2004]."

== Popular culture ==
In David Mitchell's novel Ghostwritten, Satoru, a young Japanese jazz-lover working in a record shop in Tokyo, says of a girl who comes into the store, "if you know Duke Pearson's 'After the Rain,' well, she was as beautiful and pure as that."

== Track listing ==
All compositions by Duke Pearson.

1. "Sweet Honey Bee" – 5:00
2. "Sudel" – 5:43
3. "After the Rain" – 4:45
4. "Gaslight" – 6:01
5. "Big Bertha" – 5:58
6. "Empathy" – 6:00
7. "Ready Rudy?" – 6:01

== Personnel ==
- Duke Pearson – piano
- Joe Henderson – tenor saxophone
- Freddie Hubbard – trumpet
- James Spaulding – flute, alto saxophone
- Ron Carter – bass
- Mickey Roker – drums
