= The Right Touch =

Studio album by Duke Pearson
- Released: 1968
- Recorded: September 13, 1967
- Studios: Van Gelder Studio, Englewood Cliffs, New Jersey
- Genre: Jazz
- Length: 37:44 original LP
- Labels: Blue Note; BST 84267
- Producer: Francis Wolff

Duke Pearson chronology
Sweet Honey Bee (1966)	The Right Touch (1968)	Introducing Duke Pearson's Big Band (1967)

The Right Touch is the tenth album by American pianist and arranger Duke Pearson featuring performances recorded in 1967 and released on the Blue Note label in 1968.

== Reception ==
The Allmusic review by Scott Yanow awarded the album 5 stars calling it "one of the finest recordings of Duke Pearson's career".

Professional ratings
Review scores
Source	Rating
Allmusic	5/5 stars
The Penguin Guide to Jazz Recordings	3.5/4 stars

== Track listing ==
All compositions by Duke Pearson.

1. "Chili Peppers" - 6:52
2. "Make It Good" - 6:41
3. "My Love Waits (O Meu Amor Espera)" - 5:56
4. "Los Malos Hombres" - 6:34
5. "Scrap Iron" - 5:23
6. "Rotary" - 6:18
7. "Los Malos Hombres" [Alternate Take] - 5:02 Bonus track on CD reissue and digital media releases

== Personnel ==
- Duke Pearson - piano
- Freddie Hubbard - trumpet, flugelhorn track 3
- Garnett Brown - trombone
- Jerry Dodgion - alto saxophone, flute
- James Spaulding - alto saxophone
- Stanley Turrentine - tenor saxophone
- Gene Taylor - bass
- Grady Tate - drums

== Charts ==
Chart performance for Right Touch
Chart (2023)	Peak position
US Top Jazz Albums (Billboard)	17
