= The Spoiler (album) =

Studio album by Stanley Turrentine
- Released: End of September 1967
- Recorded: September 22, 1966
- Studio: Van Gelder Studio, Englewood Cliffs, NJ
- Genre: Jazz
- Length: 39:19
- Label: Blue Note; BST 84256
- Producer: Alfred Lion

Stanley Turrentine chronology
Easy Walker (1966)	The Spoiler (1967)	A Bluish Bag (1967)

The Spoiler is an album by jazz saxophonist Stanley Turrentine recorded for the Blue Note label in 1966 and performed by Turrentine with Blue Mitchell, James Spaulding, Pepper Adams, McCoy Tyner, Julian Priester, Bob Cranshaw, and Mickey Roker with arrangements by Duke Pearson.

== Reception ==
Professional ratings
Review scores
Source	Rating
Allmusic	4.5/5 stars
The Penguin Guide to Jazz Recordings	3.5/4 stars

The Allmusic review by Scott Yanow awarded the album 4½ stars and states "despite some potentially indifferent material, Turrentine is in fine form throughout the date".

== Track listing ==
1. "The Magilla" (Duke Pearson) – 6:06
2. "When the Sun Comes Out" (Harold Arlen, Ted Koehler) – 6:00
3. "La Fiesta" (Armando Boza) – 5:05
4. "Sunny" (Bobby Hebb) – 7:23
5. "Maybe September (Theme from the Oscar)" (Ray Evans, Percy Faith, Jay Livingston) – 4:46
6. "You're Gonna Hear From Me" (André Previn, Dory Previn) – 5:21
7. "Lonesome Lover" (Billy Eckstine, Max Roach) – 4:38 Bonus track on CD

== Personnel ==
- Stanley Turrentine – tenor saxophone
- Blue Mitchell – trumpet
- Julian Priester – trombone
- James Spaulding – alto saxophone, flute
- Pepper Adams – baritone saxophone
- McCoy Tyner – piano
- Bob Cranshaw – bass, electric bass
- Mickey Roker – drums
- Joseph Rivera – percussion (tracks 1,3 & 4)
- Duke Pearson – arranger

=== Production ===
- Alfred Lion – producer
- Rudy Van Gelder – engineer
