= One for Me =

Studio album by Shirley Scott
- Released: January 1975
- Recorded: November 1974; Blue Rock Studios, New York City
- Genre: Jazz
- Label: Strata-East; SES-7430
- Producer: Shirley Scott

Shirley Scott chronology
Superstition (1973)	One for Me (1975)	Oasis (1979)

Professional ratings
Review scores
Source	Rating
Allmusic	3/5 stars

One for Me is an album by organist Shirley Scott recorded in 1974 and released on the Strata-East label.

== Reception ==
The Allmusic site awarded the album 3 stars stating "while it is nothing overly heavy or deep, it's thoughtfully and sensitively produced and of its kind an almost perfect album".

== Track listing ==
All compositions by Shirley Scott except as indicated

1. "What Makes Harold Sing?" - 8:53
2. "Keep on Movin' On" (Harold Vick) - 9:52
3. "Big George" - 5:22
4. "Don't Look Back" - 8:56
5. "Do You Know a Good Thing When You See One?" - 8:51

== Personnel ==
- Shirley Scott - organ, mellotron
- Harold Vick - tenor saxophone
- Billy Higgins - drums
- Jimmy Hopps - cowbell (track 2)
