= How Insensitive (album) =

Studio album by Duke Pearson
- Released: 1969
- Recorded: April 11, April 14 & May 5, 1969
- Studio: Van Gelder Studio, Englewood Cliffs, New Jersey
- Genre: Jazz
- Length: 33:58
- Label: Blue Note
- Producer: Duke Pearson

Duke Pearson chronology
| Now Hear This (1968) | How Insensitive (1969) | Merry Ole Soul (1969) |

How Insensitive is the fourteenth album by American pianist and arranger Duke Pearson featuring performances by Pearson's band augmented by a choir, recorded over three sessions in 1969 and released on the Blue Note label.

== Reception ==
The Allmusic review by Stephen Thomas Erlewine awarded the album with a 2-star rating, saying "Each song on How Insensitive boasts extravagant, layered arrangements that flirt with schmaltz, but the voicings and attack are so unusual, the result is a weird variation on easy listening. There is little opportunity for Pearson to showcase his tasteful playing through improvisation, yet the arrangements are so off-kilter, the music never quite works as background music. In other words, it's a very interesting failure and one of the strangest by-products of Blue Note's late-'60s commercialization".

Professional ratings
Review scores
| Source | Rating |
|---|---|
| Allmusic | 2/5 stars |

== Track listing ==
All compositions by Duke Pearson except were noted

1. "Stella by Starlight" (Ned Washington, Victor Young) – 4:39
2. "Clara" (George Gershwin, Dubose Heyward) – 2:43
3. "Give Me Your Love" – 3:24
4. "Cristo Redentor" – 3:53
5. "Little Song" (Jack Manno) – 2:53
6. "How Insensitive" (Antônio Carlos Jobim, Vinicius de Moraes, Norman Gimbel) – 2:13
7. "Sandalia Dela" (Pearson, Manno) – 3:28
8. "My Love Waits (O Meu Amor Espera)" (Pearson, Manno) – 4:35
9. "Tears" (Eumir Deodato, Ray Gilbert, Paulo Valle) – 3:29
10. "Lamento" (Jobim, de Moraes) – 2:51

- Recorded at Rudy Van Gelder Studio, Englewood Cliffs, NJ on April 11 (tracks 1 & 3–5), April 14 (tracks 2, 6 & 8), & May 5 (tracks 7, 9 & 10), 1969

== Personnel ==
- Duke Pearson – piano, electric piano, arranger
- Al Gafa – guitar (tracks 1–6 & 8)
- Dorio Ferreira – guitar, percussion (tracks 7, 9 & 10)
- Bob Cranshaw – bass (tracks 1–6 & 8)
- Bebeto Jose Souza – bass (tracks 7, 9 & 10)
- Mickey Roker – drums
- Airto Moreira – percussion
- Andy Bey – lead vocals (track 2), vocals (1, 3–6 & 8)
- Flora Purim – lead vocals (tracks 7, 9 & 10)
- The New York Group Singers' Big Band – vocals (tracks 1–6 & 8)
- Jack Manno – conductor
