= All My Yesterdays =

Live album by Thad Jones/Mel Lewis Jazz Orchestra
- Released: 2016 February 19
- Recorded: 1966 February 7 and 1966 March 21 The Village Vanguard, New York City
- Genre: Jazz
- Length: 2:05:16
- Label: Resonance
- Producer: George Klabin, Zed Feldman, Chris Smith

Thad Jones/Mel Lewis Jazz Orchestra chronology
All My Yesterdays (2016)	Presenting Thad Jones/Mel Lewis and the Jazz Orchestra (1966)

Professional ratings
Review scores
Source	Rating
Allmusic	4.5/5 stars

All My Yesterdays is a big band jazz recording of the Thad Jones/Mel Lewis Jazz Orchestra playing at the Village Vanguard club in New York City in February and March 1966. The February 7 tracks are the first recordings of the group at this club although the recording was not released until 2016. A 50-year tradition for Monday nights at the Village Vanguard began from this first evening for the Thad Jones/Mel Lewis Jazz Orchestra which later became the Mel Lewis Jazz Orchestra and eventually the Vanguard Jazz Orchestra.

The release includes a 92-page book, featuring rare, previously unpublished photos, essays, interviews and memoirs.

== Track listing ==
Disc 1

1. "Back Bone" – 13:22
2. "All My Yesterdays" 4:22
3. "Big Dipper" – 5:51
4. "Mornin' Reverend" – 4:49
5. "The Little Pixie" – 14:25
6. "Big Dipper" (alt. take) – 5:44

Disc 2

1. "Low Down" – 4:38
2. "Lover Man (Oh Where Can You Be?)" (Davis, Ramirez, Sherman) – 5:25
3. "Ah, That's Freedom" – 10:08
4. "Don't Ever Leave Me" – 4:28
5. "Willow Weep for Me" (Ronell) – 6:15
6. "Mean What You Say" – 5:51
7. "Once Around" – 12:45
8. "Polka Dots and Moonbeams" (Van Heusen, Burke) – 4:02
9. "Mornin' Reverend" – 5:49
10. "All My Yesterdays" – 4:25
11. "Back Bone" – 12:59

All songs composed by Thad Jones except as noted

== Personnel ==
- Thad Jones – flugelhorn
- Mel Lewis – drums
- Hank Jones – piano
- Richard Davis – bass
- Sam Herman – guitar
- Jerome Richardson – alto saxophone, soprano saxophone, clarinet, bass clarinet, flute
- Jerry Dodgion – alto saxophone
- Joe Farrell – tenor saxophone, clarinet, flute
- Eddie Daniels – tenor saxophone, clarinet, bass clarinet
- Pepper Adams – baritone saxophone
- Snooky Young – trumpet
- Jimmy Owens – trumpet
- Bill Berry – trumpet
- Jimmy Nottingham – trumpet
- Bob Brookmeyer – trombone
- Jack Rains – trombone
- Garnett Brown – trombone
- Cliff Heather – trombone
