= Wahoo! =

Studio album by Duke Pearson
- Released: 1965
- Recorded: November 21, 1964
- Studio: Van Gelder Studio, Englewood Cliffs, NJ
- Genre: Jazz
- Length: 43:04
- Label: Blue Note; BST 84191
- Producer: Alfred Lion

Duke Pearson chronology
Hush! (1962)	Wahoo! (1965)	Honeybuns (1965)

Alternative cover

Wahoo! is an album by American pianist and arranger Duke Pearson, featuring performances recorded in 1964 and released on the Blue Note label in 1964.

== Reception ==
Professional ratings
Review scores
Source	Rating
AllMusic	5/5 stars

The AllMusic review by Stephen Thomas Erlewine calls the album "A truly wonderful advanced hard bop date, Wahoo captures pianist Duke Pearson at his most adventurous and creative... one of the finest sophisticated hard bop dates Blue Note released in the mid-'60s".

== Track listing ==
All compositions by Duke Pearson, except where noted.

1. "Amanda" – 9:26
2. "Bedouin" – 9:30
3. "Farewell Machelle" – 2:48
4. "Wahoo" – 7:19
5. "ESP (Extrasensory Perception)" – 7:50
6. "Fly Little Bird Fly" (Donald Byrd) – 6:11

== Personnel ==
- Duke Pearson – piano
- Donald Byrd – trumpet (all tracks except #3)
- James Spaulding – alto saxophone, flute (all tracks except #3)
- Joe Henderson – tenor saxophone (all tracks except #3)
- Bob Cranshaw – bass
- Mickey Roker – drums
