= Blue Ballads =

Studio album by Archie Shepp
- Released: March 1996
- Recorded: 24–25 November 1995
- Studio: Clinton Studio "A", New York City
- Genre: Jazz
- Label: Venus; TKCV-79307

Archie Shepp chronology
The Rising Sun Collection (19924)	Blue Ballads (1996)	True Ballads (1997)

Blue Ballads is an album by saxophonist Archie Shepp and his quartet which was recorded in New York City in 1995 and released on the Venus label.

== Reception ==
Professional ratings
Review scores
Source	Rating
AllMusic	4.5/5 stars

The AllMusic review by arwulf arwulf called it and its counterparts Black Ballads, and True Ballads "intimate studies in shared introspection...[that] document Shepp's astute exploration of the ballad form during the 1990s...Once again and in all the best ways, Shepp shines in parallel with his contemporary Pharoah Sanders. Both are skilled balladeers as well as free spirits who simply cannot be bottled or pigeonholed".

== Track listing ==
1. "Little Girl Blue" (Richard Rodgers, Lorenz Hart) – 6:03
2. "More Than You Know" (Billy Rose, Edward Eliscu, Vincent Youmans) – 7:18
3. "Blue in Green" (Bill Evans, Miles Davis) – 7:58
4. "Blue and Sentimental" (Count Basie) – 5:12
5. "Cry Me a River" (Arthur Hamilton) – 7:54
6. "If I Should Lose You" (Leo Robin, Ralph Rainger) – 7:32
7. "Alone Together" (Arthur Schwartz, Howard Dietz) – 10:51

== Personnel ==
Musicians

- Archie Shepp – tenor saxophone, soprano saxophone, vocals
- George Mraz – bass
- John Hicks – piano
- Idris Muhammad – drums

Production

- Tetsuo Hara – producer
- Troy Halderson – engineer
- Brock South – assistant engineer
- Shuji Kitamura – mastering
- Iruka Studio – design
- Dennis Stock – cover photography
