= Two Elegiac Melodies =

Composition by Edvard Grieg

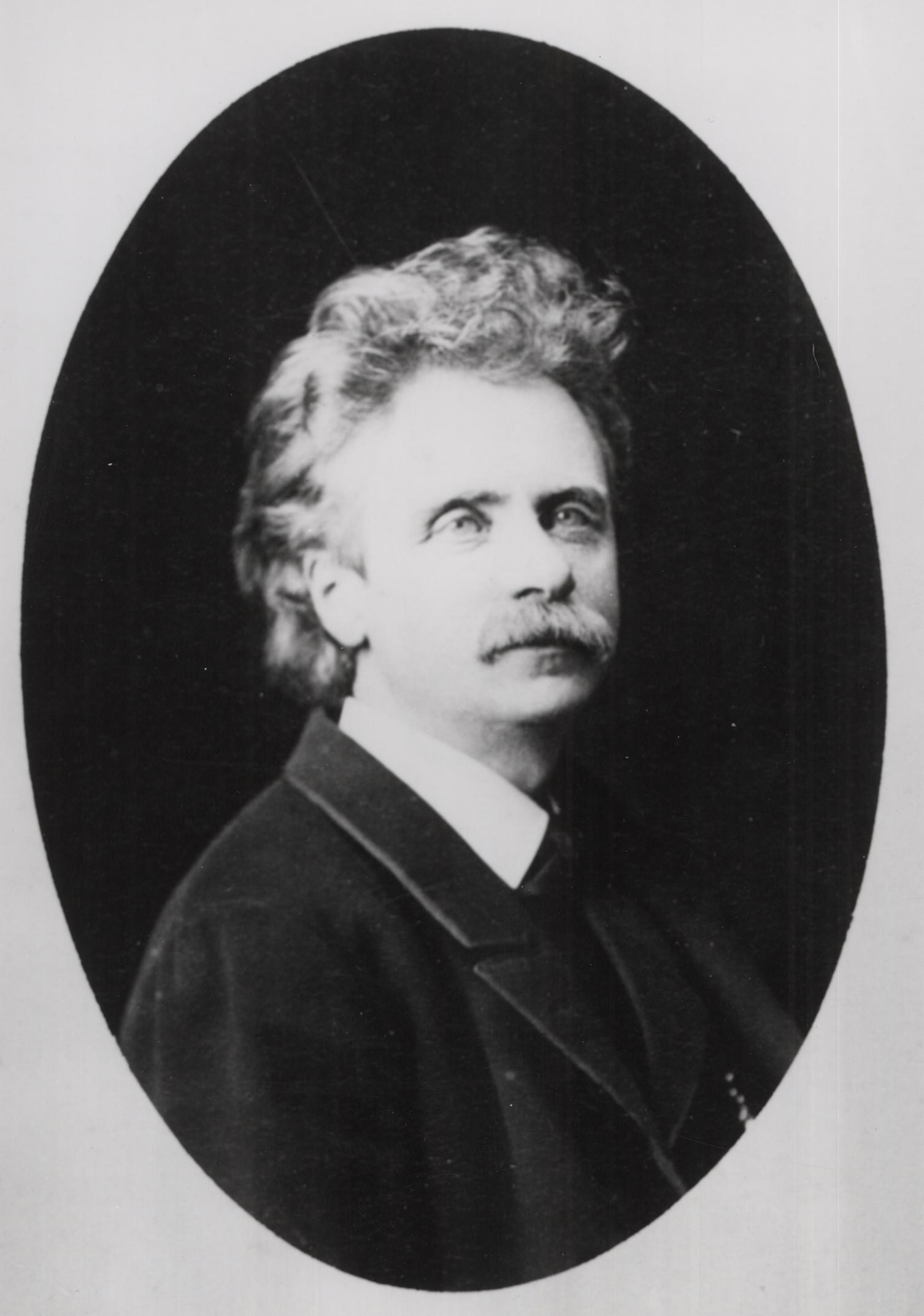
Edvard Grieg ca. 1870

Two Elegiac Melodies, Op. 34, is a composition in two movements for string orchestra by Edvard Grieg, completed in 1880 and first published in 1881.

== Background ==
The two movements are instrumental arrangements Grieg made of two of his 12 Melodies, Op. 33, published in 1880: these were settings for voice and piano of words by the Norwegian poet and journalist Aasmund Olavsson Vinje.

Two Elegiac Melodies was dedicated to Heinrich von Herzogenberg. Grieg also made an arrangement for solo piano.

== Description ==
It is scored for 1st violins (sometimes in two parts), 2nd violins (in two parts), violas (in two parts), cellos and double basses. The many parts allow for a thick texture when required.

=== "The Wounded Heart" ===
Norwegian: Hjertesår. German: Herzwunden.

Vinje's words, from Grieg's Op. 33 No. 3, relate that wounds have been suffered by the heart in the struggles of life, but it has survived; faith is not destroyed.

The music is in C minor. There are three verses: in verse 1 the melody is played by the first violins; in verse 2 by the cellos, with an insistent quaver accompaniment from all other parts, contrasting with the other verses; and in verse 3 by the first violins, the orchestration being similar to the first verse, but heavier.

The beginning of the melody of "The Wounded Heart", played by the 1st violins

=== "The Last Spring" ===
Norwegian: Våren. German: Letzter Frühling.

In Vinje's words, from Grieg's Op. 33 No. 2, the poet describes the beauty of the countryside in spring, appearing after the snow of winter; he thinks he might be seeing it for the last time.

The music is in G major. There are two verses: in both the melody is played by the first violins. The orchestration of the second verse is more developed, starting with the violins, in four parts, in high register; the rest of the strings gradually join in during the verse, until a thick texture is heard from the full string orchestra towards the end.

The beginning of the melody of "The Last Spring", played by the 1st violins
