= Electric Byrd =

Album by Donald Byrd

Studio album by Donald Byrd
- Released: November 1970
- Recorded: May 15, 1970
- Studios: Van Gelder Studio, Englewood Cliffs, New Jersey
- Genres: Jazz fusion; hard bop; samba jazz
- Length: 43:47
- Labels: Blue Note; BST 84349
- Producer: Duke Pearson

Donald Byrd chronology
Fancy Free (1969)	Electric Byrd (1970)	Kofi (1969–70)

Professional ratings
Review scores
Source	Rating
AllMusic	4.5/5 stars

Electric Byrd is a jazz fusion album by Donald Byrd released by the Blue Note label in 1970.

== Reception ==
The AllMusic review by Steve Huey awarded the album 4 stars and stated, "Donald Byrd's transitional sessions from 1969–1971 are actually some of the trumpeter's most intriguing work, balancing accessible, funky, Davis-style fusion with legitimate jazz improvisation. Electric Byrd, from 1970, is the best of the bunch, as Byrd absorbs the innovations of Bitches Brew and comes up with one of his most consistent fusion sets of any flavor."

== Track listing ==
All tracks by Donald Byrd, unless otherwise noted

1. "Estavanico" - 11:35
2. "Essence" - 10:42
3. "Xibaba" (Airto Moreira) - 13:42
4. "The Dude" - 7:48

== Personnel ==
- Donald Byrd - trumpet
- Jerry Dodgion - alto sax, soprano sax, and flute
- Frank Foster - tenor saxophone and alto clarinet
- Lew Tabackin - tenor saxophone and flute
- Pepper Adams - baritone saxophone and clarinet
- Bill Campbell - trombone
- Hermeto Pascoal - flute (on "Xibaba" only)
- Wally Richardson - guitar
- Duke Pearson - electric piano
- Ron Carter - bass
- Mickey Roker - drums
- Airto Moreira - percussion
