= Slow Drag (album) =

Studio album by Donald Byrd
- Released: December 1968
- Recorded: May 12, 1967
- Studios: Van Gelder Studio, Englewood Cliffs, NJ
- Genres: Jazz; hard bop
- Length: 38:35
- Labels: Blue Note; BST 84292
- Producer: Alfred Lion

Donald Byrd chronology
| Blackjack (1967) | Slow Drag (1968) | The Creeper (1967) |

Professional ratings
Review scores
| Source | Rating |
|---|---|
| Allmusic | 4/5 stars |

Slow Drag is a jazz album by trumpeter Donald Byrd recorded in 1967 and released on the Blue Note label as BST 84292.

== Track listing ==
1. "Slow Drag" (Byrd) – 9:47
2. "Secret Love" (Sammy Fain, Paul Francis Webster) – 3:57
3. "Book's Bossa" (Walter Booker, Walton) – 6:52
4. "Jelly Roll" (Sonny Red Kyner) – 5:21
5. "The Loner" (Ronnie Mathews, Walton) – 6:17
6. "My Ideal" (Richard A. Whiting, Newell Chase, Leo Robin) – 6:21

== Personnel ==
- Donald Byrd – trumpet
- Sonny Red – alto sax
- Cedar Walton – piano
- Walter Booker – bass
- Billy Higgins – drums, vocals (track 1)
