= Now Hear This (Duke Pearson album) =

Studio album by Duke Pearson
- Released: 1969
- Recorded: December 3, 1968
- Studio: Van Gelder Studio, Englewood Cliffs, New Jersey
- Genre: Jazz
- Length: 43:19
- Label: Blue Note; BST 84308
- Producer: Duke Pearson

Duke Pearson chronology
The Phantom (1968)	Now Hear This (1969)	How Insensitive (1969)

Now Hear This is the thirteenth album by American pianist and arranger Duke Pearson. It features big band performances recorded in 1968 and released on the Blue Note label.

== Reception ==
The Allmusic review by Stephen Thomas Erlewine awarded the album 4½ stars stating "Duke Pearson returned to a big band setting for Now Hear This!, once again proving his agility and inventiveness as an arranger and leader... Even if much of this music is beautiful, Pearson's arrangements take chances and are unconventional, which means it rewards close listening as well".

Professional ratings
Review scores
Source	Rating
Allmusic	4.5/5 stars

== Track listing ==
All compositions by Duke Pearson except where noted

1. "Disapproachment" (Frank Foster) - 5:49
2. "I'm Tired Crying Over You" (Buddy Johnson) - 3:43
3. "Tones for Joan's Bones" (Chick Corea) - 5:33
4. "Amanda" - 3:42
5. "Dad Digs Mom" (and Mom Digs Dad)" - 2:47
6. "Minor League" - 6:37
7. "Here's That Rainy Day" (Jimmy Van Heusen, Johnny Burke) - 4:26
8. "Make It Good" - 4:41
9. "Days of Wine and Roses" (Henry Mancini, Johnny Mercer) - 6:01

== Personnel ==
- Duke Pearson - piano, arranger (tracks 2–9)
- Jim Bossy, Randy Brecker, Burt Collins, Joe Shepley, Marvin Stamm - trumpet
- Garnett Brown, Jimmy Cleveland, Benny Powell - trombone
- Kenny Rupp - bass trombone
- Jerry Dodgion, Al Gibbons - alto saxophone
- Lew Tabackin - tenor saxophone
- Frank Foster - tenor saxophone, arranger (track 1)
- Pepper Adams - baritone saxophone
- Bob Cranshaw - bass
- Mickey Roker - drums
- Andy Bey - vocals (track 2)
