= At the Half Note Cafe =

Live album by Donald Byrd
- Released: 1961
- Recorded: November 11, 1960
- Venues: Half Note Cafe, NYC
- Genre: Jazz
- Length: 121:26 (Double CD reissue)
- Labels: Blue Note; BLP 4060 (Vol. 1); BLP 4061 (Vol. 2)

Donald Byrd chronology
Byrd in Flight (1960)	At the Half Note Cafe (1961)	Motor City Scene (1960)

At the Half Note Cafe, Vols. 1 & 2 are a pair of separate but related live albums by American trumpeter Donald Byrd recorded at the Half Note in Manhattan on November 11, 1960 and released on Blue Note the following year. Byrd's quintet features saxophonist Pepper Adams and rhythm section Duke Pearson, Laymon Jackson and Lex Humphries.

== Release history ==
The albums were later reissued as a double CD set, At the Half Note Cafe, Volumes 1&2.

== Reception ==
Professional ratings
Review scores
Source	Rating
AllMusic	4.5/5 stars
The Penguin Guide to Jazz	3/4 stars

The AllMusic review by Thom Jurek states, "This was a hot quintet, one that not only swung hard, but possessed a deep lyricism and an astonishing sense of timing, and one need only this set by them to feel the full measure of their worth."

The Penguin Guide to Jazz says the sessions were "impeccable played and atmospherically recorded, but they tend to show off the best and worst of Byrd: ... he peels off chorus after chorus of manicured licks, and the process gets repeated throughout".

== Track listing ==
=== At the Half Note Cafe, Volume 1 ===
All tracks are written by Donald Byrd.

Side 1
No.	Title	Writer(s)	Length
1.	"My Girl Shirl"	Duke Pearson
2.	"Soulful Kiddy"

Side 2
No.	Title	Writer(s)	Length
1.	"A Portrait of Jennie"	Gordon Burdge; J. Russel Robinson
2.	"Cecile"
3.	"The Theme"

=== At the Half Note Cafe, Volume 2 ===
Side 1
No.	Title	Writer(s)	Length
1.	"Jeannine"	Duke Pearson
2.	"Pure D. Funk"

Side 2
No.	Title	Writer(s)	Length
1.	"Kimyas"
2.	"When Sonny Gets Blue"	Marvin Fisher; Jack Segal

=== At the Half Note Cafe, Volumes 1&2 ===
All tracks are written by Donald Byrd, except as noted.

Disc one
No.	Title	Writer(s)	Length
1.	"Introduction by Ruth Mason"		1:20
2.	"My Girl Shirl"	Duke Pearson	10:32
3.	"Soulful Kiddy"		9:55
4.	"Child's Play"	Byrd; Pearson	8:45
5.	"Chant"	Pearson	11:03
6.	"A Portrait of Jennie"	Gordon Burdge; J. Russel Robinson	6:48
7.	"Cecile"		14:46

Disc two
No.	Title	Writer(s)	Length
1.	"Jeannine"	Oscar Brown, Jr.; Pearson	13:08
2.	"Pure D. Funk"		6:09
3.	"Between the Devil and the Deep Blue Sea"	Harold Arlen; Ted Koehler	9:54
4.	"Theme from Mr. Lucky"	Henry Mancini	10:51
5.	"Kimyas"		11:58
6.	"When Sunny Gets Blue"	Marvin Fisher; Jack Segal	6:17

== Personnel ==
=== Musicians ===
- Donald Byrd – trumpet
- Pepper Adams – baritone saxophone
- Duke Pearson – piano
- Laymon Jackson – bass
- Lex Humphries – drums

=== Technical personnel ===
- Alfred Lion – producer
- Rudy Van Gelder – recording engineer, mastering
- Reid Miles – cover design
- Francis Wolff – photography
- Leonard Feather – liner notes
