= Earl K. Brent =

American songwriter

Earl Karl Brent (June 21, 1914 in St. Louis, Missouri – July 8, 1977 in Hollywood, California) was an American songwriter, lyricist and composer.

He is best known as the lyricist of the 1946 song "Angel Eyes", written with Matt Dennis.

Brent contributed songs or to the scores of many films, most notably during the 1940s. These included, as lyricist, "Love Is Where You Find It", written with Nacio Herb Brown for the film version of A Date with Judy, and "Let There Be Music", written with Yip Harburg. Some of his songs were set to music of classical composers, including "Springtide" (sung by Jeanette MacDonald), set to Grieg's "The Last Spring", and "Waltz Serenade", set to Tchaikovsky's "Valse" from Serenade for Strings.
