= Alone Together (Flying Colors song) =

1932 song by Arthur Schwartz and Howard Dietz

"Alone Together" is a song composed by Arthur Schwartz with lyrics by Howard Dietz. It was introduced in the Broadway musical Flying Colors in 1932 by Jean Sargent.

The song soon became a hit, with Leo Reisman and His Orchestra's 1932 recording (vocal by Frank Luther) being the first to reach the charts. It has become a jazz standard. The first jazz musician to record the song was Artie Shaw in 1939.

First measures of Alone Together

== Other versions ==
- Pepper Adams – Conjuration: Fat Tuesday's Session (1957)
- Chet Baker – Chet (1959)
- Tony Bennett – recorded on February 28, 1960, for his album Alone Together (1960).
- Pat Boone – for his album The Touch of Your Lips (1964).
- Ray Charles and Betty Carter – Ray Charles and Betty Carter (1961)
- Vic Damone – for his album This Game of Love (1959).
- Miles Davis – Blue Moods (1955)
- Paul Desmond with Jim Hall – Take Ten (1963)
- Kenny Dorham — Quiet Kenny (1960)
- Jim Hall–Ron Carter Duo – Alone Together (Ron Carter and Jim Hall album) (1973)
- Judy Garland – That's Entertainment! (1960)
- Dizzy Gillespie – (1950)
- Charlie Haden – None but the Lonely Heart (1997)
- Peggy Lee – for the album Things Are Swingin' (1959).
- Julie London – Make Love to Me (1957).
- Barry Manilow – Night Songs (2014).
- Sonny Rollins – Sonny Rollins and the Contemporary Leaders (1958)
- Wallace Roney – Obsession (1990)
- Artie Shaw – (1939)
- Archie Shepp – Blue Ballads (1996)
- Carly Simon – included in her album Moonlight Serenade (2005).
- Jo Stafford – a single release (1945).
- Mel Torme – included in his album My Kind of Music (1961).
- Stanley Turrentine – Easy Walker (1966)
- Mal Waldron – No More Tears (1988)
- Margaret Whiting – recorded on August 19, 1952, for Capitol Records (catalog No. 2217).
- Bill Evans – Live At The Trident Club (1964)

== See also ==
- List of 1930s jazz standards
