= Mickey Roker =

American drummer

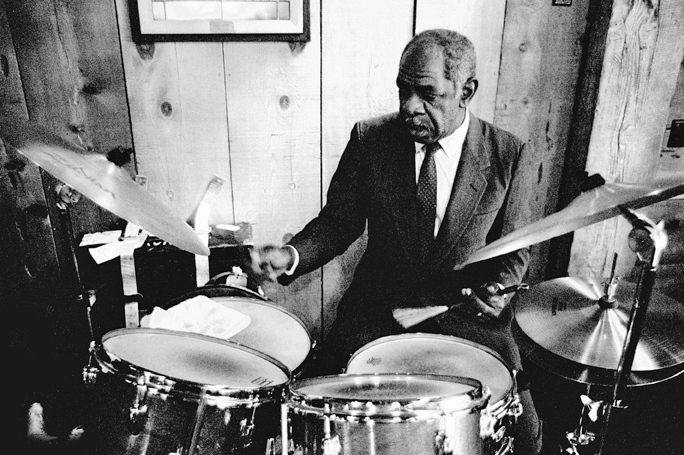
- Roker in the 1980s

Background information
- Born: Granville William Roker; September 3, 1932; Miami, Florida, U.S.
- Died: May 22, 2017 (aged 84) Philadelphia, Pennsylvania, U.S.
- Genres: Jazz, hard bop, bebop
- Occupation: Musician
- Instrument: Drums

Granville William "Mickey" Roker (September 3, 1932 – May 22, 2017) was an American jazz drummer.

== Biography ==
Roker was born into extreme poverty in Miami to Granville (Sr.) and Willie Mae Roker. After his mother died (his father never lived with them), when he was only ten, he was taken by his grandmother to live in Philadelphia with his uncle Walter, who gave him his first drum kit and communicated his love of jazz to his nephew. He also introduced the young Roker to the jazz scene in Philadelphia, where drummer Philly Joe Jones became Roker's idol.

In the early 1950s, he began to gain recognition as a sensitive yet hard-driving big-band drummer. He was especially favored by Dizzy Gillespie, who remarked of him that "once he sets a groove, whatever it is, you can go to Paris and come back and it's right there. You never have to worry about it." Roker was soon in demand for his supportive skills in both big-band and small-group settings.

While in Philadelphia he played with Jimmy Oliver, Jimmy Heath, Jimmy Divine, King James and Sam Reed before moving to New York in 1959, where his first gigs were with Gigi Gryce, Ray Bryant, Joe Williams, Junior Mance, Nancy Wilson and the Duke Pearson big band.

In 1965 Mickey joined Art Farmer and Benny Golson's revamped group, the "New York Jazz Sextet".

In 1992, he replaced Connie Kay in the Modern Jazz Quartet.

He recorded with Dizzy Gillespie, Sonny Rollins, Duke Pearson, Tommy Flanagan, Ella Fitzgerald, Zoot Sims, Horace Silver, Junior Mance, Sarah Vaughan, Milt Jackson, Herbie Hancock, Phil Woods, Oscar Peterson, Ray Brown, Bucky Pizzarelli, Stanley Turrentine, Toshiko Akiyoshi, Hank Jones, Bobby Hutcherson, Joe Locke, and many other jazz musicians.

Roker was still active on the Philadelphia music scene during the 21st century. He died in Philadelphia, Pennsylvania, at the age of 84, of natural causes, though he had been suffering from diabetes, lung cancer, and other health issues.

== Discography ==
=== As sideman ===
With Nat Adderley

- Little Big Horn (Riverside, 1963)

With Gene Ammons

- Got My Own (Prestige, 1972)
- Big Bad Jug (Prestige, 1972)
- Together Again for the Last Time (Prestige, 1973 [1976]) - with Sonny Stitt

With Roy Ayers

- Daddy Bug (Atlantic, 1969)

With Joshua Breakstone

- Let's Call This Monk! (Double-Time, 1997)

With Randy Brecker

- Score (Solid State, 1969)

With Ray Brown

- Red Hot Ray Brown Trio (Concord, 1987)

With Ray Bryant

- Con Alma (Columbia, 1960)
- Dancing the Big Twist (Columbia, 1961)

With Donald Byrd

The Creeper (Blue Note, 1967)

Electric Byrd (Blue Note, 1970)

Kofi (Blue Note, 1969, 1970)00

With Jon Faddis

- Youngblood (Pablo, 1976)

With Art Farmer

- The Time and the Place: The Lost Concert (Mosaic, 1966 [2007])
- The Time and the Place (Columbia, 1967)
- The Art Farmer Quintet Plays the Great Jazz Hits (Columbia, 1967)

With Frank Foster

- Manhattan Fever (Blue Note, 1968)

With Dizzy Gillespie

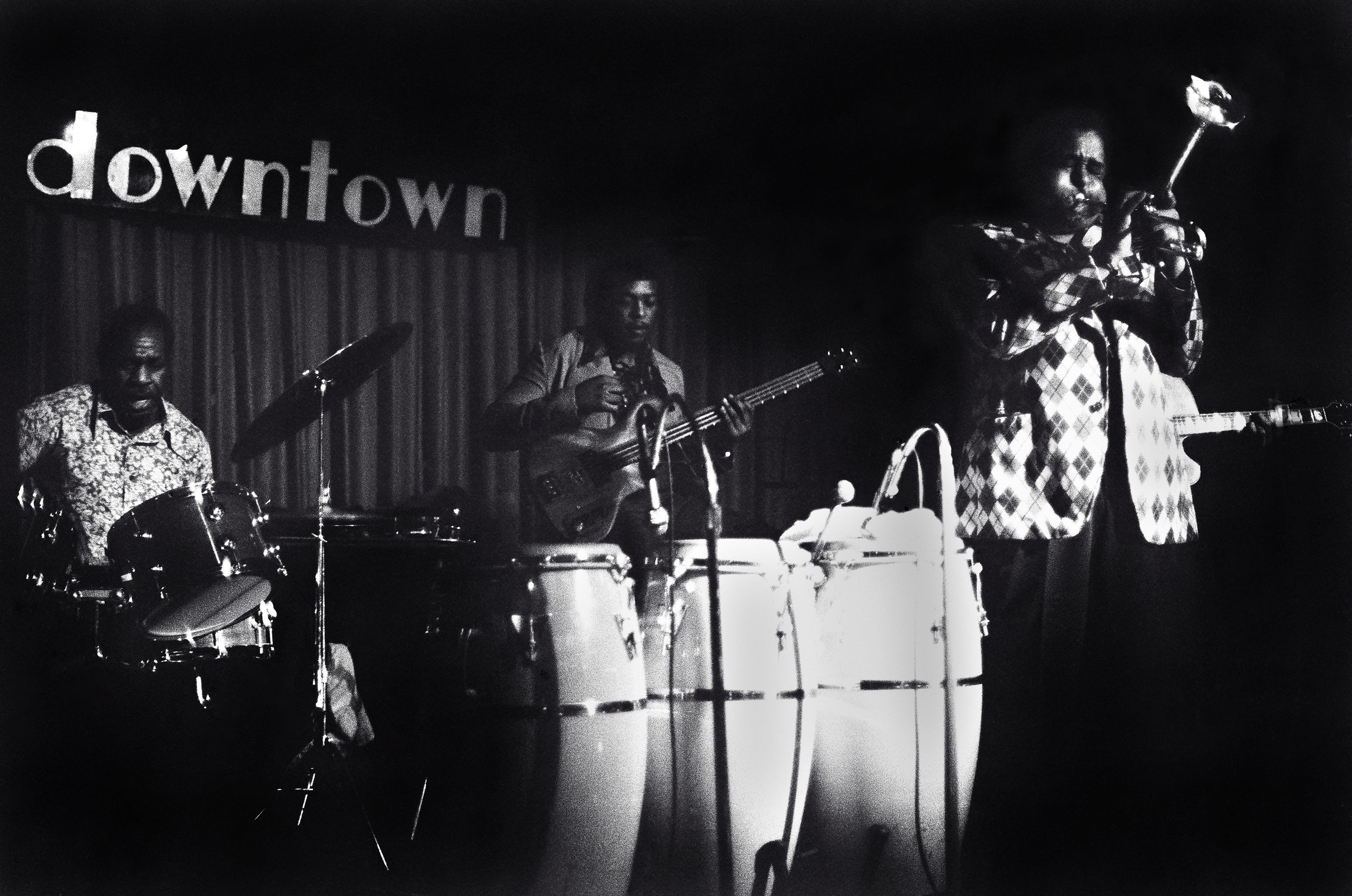
Left to right: Roker, Ben Brown, Dizzy Gillespie, and a hidden Rodney Jones in Buffalo, N.Y., 1977

- Dizzy Gillespie's Big 4 (Pablo, 1974)
- Afro-Cuban Jazz Moods (Pablo, 1975) with Machito
- The Dizzy Gillespie Big 7 (Pablo, 1975)
- Bahiana (Pablo, 1975)
- Carter, Gillespie Inc. (Pablo, 1976) with Benny Carter
- Dizzy's Party (Pablo, 1976)

With Gigi Gryce

- Saying Somethin'! (New Jazz, 1960)
- The Hap'nin's (New Jazz, 1960)
- The Rat Race Blues (New Jazz, 1960)
- Doin' the Gigi (Uptown, 2011)

With Herbie Hancock

- Speak Like a Child (Blue Note, 1968)

With Gene Harris

- The Gene Harris Trio Plus One (Concord, 1984)

With Bobby Hutcherson

- San Francisco (Blue Note, 1970)

With Milt Jackson

- Born Free (Limelight, 1966)
- Milt Jackson and the Hip String Quartet (Verve, 1968)
- Olinga (CTI, 1974)
- The Milt Jackson Big 4 (Pablo, 1975)

With Willis Jackson

- Really Groovin' (Prestige, 1961)
- In My Solitude (Moodsville, 1961)

With Hank Jones

- Groovin' High (Muse, 1978)

With Sam Jones

- Something New (Interplay, 1979)

With Irene Kral

- Better Than Anything (Äva, 1963)

With Charles Kynard

- The Soul Brotherhood (Prestige, 1969)

With Mike Longo

- Funkia (Groove Merchant, 1973)
- Talk with the Spirits (Pablo, 1976)

With Junior Mance

- Junior's Blues (Riverside, 1962)
- Happy Time (Jazzland, 1962)
- Monk (Live) (Chiaroscuro, 2003)

With Herbie Mann

- Stone Flute (Embryo, 1969 [1970])

With Blue Mitchell

- Boss Horn (Blue Note, 1966)

With the Modern Jazz Quartet

- MJQ & Friends: A 40th Anniversary Celebration (Atlantic, 1994)

With Lee Morgan

- Standards (Blue Note, 1967)
- Live at the Lighthouse (Blue Note, 1970)
- Sonic Boom (Blue Note, released 1979)

With The N.Y. Hardbop Quintet

- Rokermotion (TCB, 1996)

With Joe Pass

- Quadrant (Pablo, 1977)

With Duke Pearson

- Wahoo! (1964)
- Honeybuns (1965)
- Prairie Dog (1966)
- Sweet Honey Bee (Blue Note, 1966)
- Introducing Duke Pearson's Big Band (Blue Note, 1967)
- The Phantom (Blue Note, 1968)
- Now Hear This (Blue Note, 1968)
- How Insensitive (Blue Note, 1969)
- It Could Only Happen with You (1970)

With Oscar Peterson and Stephane Grappelli

- Skol (Pablo, 1979)

With Billie Poole

- Confessin' the Blues (Riverside, 1963)

With Sonny Rollins

- There Will Never Be Another You (album) (Impulse!, 1965)
- Sonny Rollins on Impulse! (Impulse!, 1965)

With Shirley Scott

- Soul Duo (Impulse!, 1966) with Clark Terry
- Oasis (Muse, 1989)
- Great Scott! (Muse, 1991)
- Blues Everywhere (Candid, 1991)
- Skylark (Candid, 1991)

With Horace Silver

- All (Blue Note, 1972)
- In Pursuit of the 27th Man (Blue Note, 1973)

With Buddy Terry

- Awareness (Mainstream, 1971)

With Stanley Turrentine

- Rough 'n' Tumble (Blue Note, 1966)
- The Spoiler (Blue Note, 1966)

With McCoy Tyner

- Live at Newport (Impulse!, 1963)

With Harold Vick

- The Caribbean Suite (RCA Victor, 1966)
- Commitment (Muse, 1967 [1974])

With Mary Lou Williams

- Zoning (Mary Records, 1974 - later reissued by Smithsonian Folkways, with expansion)
- Free Spirits (SteepleChase, 1975)

With Cedar Walton

- The Electric Boogaloo Song (Prestige, 1969)

With Joe Williams

- At Newport '63 (RCA Victor, 1963)

With Reuben Wilson

- The Cisco Kid (Groove Merchant, 1973)

With Phil Woods

- Rights of Swing (Candid, 1961)
