= Duke Pearson =

American jazz pianist and composer (1932–80)

Background information
- Born: Columbus Calvin Pearson Jr. August 17, 1932; Atlanta, Georgia, U.S
- Died: August 4, 1980 (aged 47) Atlanta, Georgia, U.S
- Genres: Jazz; hard bop; soul jazz
- Occupations: Musician; composer; record producer
- Instrument: Piano
- Years active: 1950s–1980
- Labels: Blue Note; Atlantic

Columbus Calvin "Duke" Pearson Jr. (August 17, 1932 – August 4, 1980) was an American jazz pianist and composer. Allmusic describes him as having a "big part in shaping the Blue Note label's hard bop direction in the 1960s as a record producer."

== Early life ==
Pearson was born Columbus Calvin Pearson Jr. in Atlanta, Georgia, to Columbus Calvin and Emily Pearson. The moniker "Duke" was given to him by his uncle, who was a great admirer of Duke Ellington. Before he was six, his mother started giving him piano lessons. He studied the instrument until he was twelve, when he took an interest in brass instruments: mellophone, baritone horn and ultimately trumpet. He was so fond of the trumpet that through high school and college he neglected the piano. He attended Clark College while also playing trumpet in groups in the Atlanta area. While in the U.S. Army, during his 1953–54 draft, he continued to play trumpet and met, among others, the pianist Wynton Kelly. Pearson himself confessed in a 1959 interview that he was "so spoiled by Kelly's good piano" that he decided to switch to piano again. Also, it seems that dental problems forced him to give up brass instruments.

== Career ==
Pearson performed with different ensembles in Georgia and Florida, including with Tab Smith and Little Willie John, before he moved to New York City in January 1959. He had, however, been able to get at least one song, "Tribute to Brownie" (dedicated to Clifford Brown), recorded by the Cannonball Adderley Quintet on their 1957 album, Sophisticated Swing. In New York, Pearson gained the attention of the trumpeter Donald Byrd, who saw Pearson performing with the Art Farmer/Benny Golson Sextet (known as the Jazztet). Shortly afterwards, Byrd asked Pearson to join his newly formed band, the Donald Byrd–Pepper Adams Quintet. Pearson was also the accompanist for Nancy Wilson on tour in 1961. During that same year, Pearson became ill before a Byrd-Adams show, and a newcomer, Herbie Hancock, took over for him. Hancock eventually took over the position permanently.

On the 1963 Byrd album A New Perspective, Pearson arranged four tracks, including "Cristo Redentor", which became a hit. The composition, Pearson later commented, was inspired by a trip he took to Brazil while touring with Wilson. Also that year, after the death of Ike Quebec, Pearson took over his position as A&R man of Blue Note. From that year until 1970, Pearson was a frequent session musician and producer for numerous Blue Note albums while also recording his own albums as bandleader. This was odd, since Pearson also recorded with his co-led big band with Byrd for Atlantic Records, a stipulation he made sure was in his Atlantic contract. The Byrd-Pearson band consisted of musicians such as Chick Corea, Pepper Adams, Randy Brecker, and Garnett Brown; the latter three were members also of the Thad Jones-Mel Lewis band that played the same night club, The Village Vanguard, but on different nights. Between the two ensembles, the musicians performed at their own discretion.

Pearson's compositions include the now standard, frequently covered "Jeannine", composed c. 1960. An early cover of "Jeannine" appears on the Cannonball Adderley album Them Dirty Blues, recorded in February 1960; the song was also covered by Donald Byrd on the album At the Half Note Cafe, recorded in November 1960. A vocalese version with lyrics by Oscar Brown, Jr. was recorded by Eddie Jefferson on the album The Main Main, recorded in October 1974, and was covered on The Manhattan Transfer's 1984 album Bop Doo-Wopp. The Steve Lehman Trio recorded the song on their 2011 album Dialect Fluorescent.

As a small side project at Blue Note, Pearson penned the liner notes for Grant Green’s 1963 album, Idle Moments. He was the pianist for the recording. Having also composed the album’s title track, he wrote, “I wonder while listening to this recording, just what the people involved were thinking of while idling away (so to speak). The dreamlike mood that prevails gave me the idea of naming this tune Idle Moments.”

Pearson eventually retired from his position with Blue Note in 1971 after personnel changes were made; co-founder Alfred Lion retired in 1967 after the label was sold to Liberty Records the previous year, and co-founder Francis Wolff died in 1971. Pearson opted to teach at Clark College in 1971, toured with Carmen McRae and Joe Williams through 1973, and eventually re-formed his big band during that time.

He was diagnosed with multiple sclerosis in the 1970s, from which he died in 1980 at Atlanta Veterans Hospital.

== Discography ==
=== As leader ===
Year recorded	Title	Label	Year released	Notes
1959	Profile	Blue Note	1960	Trio, with Gene Taylor (bass), Lex Humphries (drums)
1959	Tender Feelin's	Blue Note	1960	Trio, with Gene Taylor (bass), Lex Humphries (drums)
1961	Angel Eyes	Polydor	1968	Also released as Bags Groove on Black Lion with 3 alternative takes
1961	Dedication!	Prestige	1970	Reissued by Black Lion in 1989 under Freddie Hubbard's name as Minor Mishap
1962	Hush!	Jazztime	1962	
1964	Wahoo!	Blue Note	1965	
1965	Honeybuns	Atlantic	1966	
1966	Prairie Dog	Atlantic	1966	
1966	Sweet Honey Bee	Blue Note	1967	
1967	The Right Touch	Blue Note	1968	
1967	Introducing Duke Pearson's Big Band	Blue Note	1968	
1968	The Phantom	Blue Note	1968	
1968	Now Hear This	Blue Note	1969	
1969	How Insensitive	Blue Note	1969	
1969	Merry Ole Soul	Blue Note	1969	
1968–1970	I Don't Care Who Knows It	Blue Note	1996	
1970	It Could Only Happen with You	Blue Note	1974	

=== As sideman ===
With Donald Byrd

- Fuego (Blue Note, 1960) – rec. 1959
- Byrd in Flight (Blue Note, 1960)
- At the Half Note Cafe (Blue Note, 1961) – rec. 1960
- The Cat Walk (Blue Note, 1962) – rec. 1961
- A New Perspective (Blue Note, 1964) – rec. 1963
- Fancy Free (Blue Note, 1969)
- Electric Byrd (Blue Note, 1970)
- Kofi (Blue Note, 1995) – rec. 1969–1970

With others

- Johnny Coles, Little Johnny C (Blue Note, 1963, and arranger)
- Grant Green, Idle Moments (Blue Note, 1963)
- Bobby Hutcherson, The Kicker (Blue Note, 1963)
- Thad Jones/Pepper Adams Quintet, Mean What You Say (Milestone, 1966)
- Carmen McRae, Carmen (1972)

=== As Arranger ===
- Lou Donaldson - Lush Life (1967)
- Donald Byrd - A New Perspective (1963), I'm Tryin' to Get Home (1964)
- Grant Green - Am I Blue (1963)
- Blue Mitchell - Boss Horn (1966), Heads Up! (1967)
- Hank Mobley - A Slice of the Top (1966)
- Lee Morgan - Standards (1967)
- Stanley Turrentine - Rough 'n' Tumble (1966), The Spoiler (1966), A Bluish Bag (1967), The Return of the Prodigal Son (1967), The Look of Love (1968)
