= I've Got a Right to Sing the Blues =

Studio album by Sir Roland Hanna and Carrie Smith
- Released: 2002
- Recorded: 2002
- Genre: Jazz
- Length: 59:14
- Label: IPO; IPOC1003
- Producer: William F. Sorin

Sir Roland Hanna chronology
Everything I Love (2002)	I've Got a Right to Sing the Blues (2002)	Milano, Paris, New York: Finding John Lewis (2003)

I've Got a Right to Sing the Blues is an album by pianist Sir Roland Hanna and vocalist Carrie Smith performing songs by Harold Arlen which was released by IPO Recordings in 2002.

== Reception ==
Professional ratings
Review scores
Source	Rating
AllMusic	4/5 stars
The Penguin Guide to Jazz Recordings	3/4 stars
The Village Voice	A−

Reviewing for The Village Voice in July 2004, Tom Hull said that Hanna is "a model of precise economy, which serves him especially well as sole accompanist here. His leads frame the songs lucidly. Then he provides the unobtrusive support Smith needs."

AllMusic reviewer Scott Yanow stated "Smith initially gained recognition for her ability to emulate Bessie Smith a bit, but on this date she is a lighter-toned swing singer whose subtle creativity uplifts the familiar songs. Hanna, on one of his final recordings, functions as both Smith's accompanist and as a full orchestra by himself. ... The results are quite enjoyable".

In JazzTimes Doug Ramsey wrote "Smith is Sir Roland’s full partner in the collaboration. They find the profound moods and bright colors in Arlen’s music ... Smith modifies the power of her deep voice ... He solos on every piece at his customary high level. Pairing these individualists was an inspired idea".

On All About Jazz C. Michael Bailey said "As an introduction to Arlen’s music, one could not ask for more than what's on this disc"

== Track listing ==
1. "Accentuate the Positive" (Harold Arlen, Johnny Mercer) – 5:05
2. "When the Sun Comes Out" (Arlen, Ted Koehler) – 4:18
3. "Happiness Is a Thing Called Joe" (Arlen, Yip Harburg) – 4:59
4. "Ill Wind" (Arlen, Koehler) – 5:37
5. "I've Got the World on a String" (Arlen, Koehler) – 4:05
6. "Let's Fall in Love" (Arlen, Koehler) – 3:59
7. "I Gotta Right to Sing the Blues" (Arlen, Koehler) – 7:38
8. "Blues in the Night" (Arlen, Mercer) – 5:30
9. "Stormy Weather" (Arlen, Koehler) – 4:28
10. "It's Only a Paper Moon" (Arlen, Harburg, Billy Rose) – 3:32
11. "That Old Black Magic" (Arlen, Mercer) – 4:32
12. "Over the Rainbow" (Arlen, Harburg) – 6:20

== Personnel ==
- Sir Roland Hanna – piano
- Carrie Smith – vocals
