= Tom Pierson =

American conductor, composer and film director

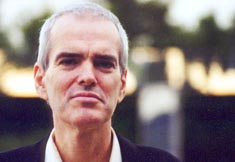
Tom Pierson

Thomas Pierson (born March 11, 1948 Ashland, Wisconsin) is an American composer, conductor and film director.

At the age of 13, he debuted as a soloist with the Houston Symphony. He studied at the Juilliard School to become a classical pianist and later turned to jazz. He conducted Leonard Bernstein's Mass at the Metropolitan Opera. He has conducted other works as well, including Candide. He has scored films for Woody Allen, notably Manhattan, and Robert Altman's Quintet. He filmed Turkey Boy in Japan in 2008.

== Work ==
- Songs from the movie "Turkey Boy", 2008, CD
- "Turkey Boy", 2008, DVD
- Deep Forest By Bruce Huebner, Zabu Tone Music ZT006, CD 2008, as pianist
- Olathe By Richie Pratt, Artists Recording Collective ARC-2093, CD 2007, as pianist
- The Hidden Goddess, 2003, CD, Point of No Return Music (806635019475), AUTEUR
- Left, Right, 2001, CD
- Tom Pierson III, 1999, CD, Oglio Records
- Tom Pierson II, 1993, CD, AUTEUR
- Planet of Tears, 1990, CD
- American Playhouse, 1982, orchestrator; 1 episode - Working TV episode
- Popeye (film), 1980, composer: additional score
- Manhattan (film), 1979, music adapted/arranged by
- Hair (film), 1979, conductor/arranger, vocals, as Thomas Pierson
- Quintet (film), 1979
- A Perfect Couple, 1979, Orchestra Conductor
- The World of Magic, NBC 1975, hosted by Bill Cosby, as music director
