= To My Queen Revisited =

Studio album by Walt Dickerson Quartet
- Released: 1979
- Recorded: July 6, 1978
- Genre: Jazz
- Length: 48:41
- Label: SteepleChase; SCS 1112
- Producer: Nils Winther

Walt Dickerson chronology
Shades of Love (1978)	To My Queen Revisited (1979)	Visions (1978)

To My Queen Revisited is an album by vibraphonist Walt Dickerson's Quartet recorded in 1978 for the SteepleChase label. The album references Dickerson's 1962 album To My Queen and the title composition.

== Reception ==
Professional ratings
Review scores
Source	Rating
Allmusic	3/5 stars
The Penguin Guide to Jazz Recordings	2.5/4 stars

Allmusic gave the album 3 stars.

== Track listing ==
All compositions by Walt Dickerson

1. "Liz" – 5:30
2. "The Ultimate You" – 13:43
3. "To My Queen Revisited" – 23:49
4. "Liz" [take 1] – 5:32 Bonus track on CD reissue

== Personnel ==
- Walt Dickerson – vibraphone
- Albert Dailey – piano
- Andy McKee – bass
- Jimmi Johnsun – drums
