= A Sense of Direction =

Studio album by Walt Dickerson
- Released: 1961
- Recorded: May 5, 1961
- Studio: Van Gelder Studio, Englewood Cliffs, New Jersey
- Genre: Jazz
- Length: 40:54
- Label: New Jazz; NJLP 8268
- Producer: Esmond Edwards

Walt Dickerson chronology
This Is Walt Dickerson! (1961)	A Sense of Direction (1961)	Relativity (1962)

A Sense of Direction is an album led by vibraphonist and composer Walt Dickerson recorded in 1961 and released on the New Jazz label.

== Reception ==
Professional ratings
Review scores
Source	Rating
AllMusic	4.5/5 stars
Down Beat	4.5/5 stars
The Penguin Guide to Jazz Recordings	2.5/4 stars

AllMusic reviewer Steve Huey stated: "If it's a shade less challenging and inventive than This Is Walt Dickerson!, A Sense of Direction compensates by making Dickerson's innovations more accessible and inviting". DownBeat reviewer Pete Welding wrote: "if it is only slightly less adventurous than his initial recording, it is still an ardent collection -- primarily of ballads -- treated with unflagging invention and restrain ...Were it not for the slight conventionality of some of the numbers, the rating would have been five stars."

== Track listing ==
All compositions by Walt Dickerson except as indicated

1. "Sense of Direction" - 6:00
2. "Ode to Boy" - 5:30
3. "Togetherness" - 3:00
4. "What's New?" (Johnny Burke, Bob Haggart) - 4:44
5. "Good Earth" - 3:33
6. "Why" - 4:48
7. "You Go to My Head" (J. Fred Coots, Haven Gillespie) - 8:19
8. "If I Should Lose You" (Ralph Rainger, Leo Robin) - 5:00

== Personnel ==
- Walt Dickerson – vibraphone
- Austin Crowe – piano
- Eustis Guillemet Jr. – bass
- Edgar Bateman – drums
