= Shades of Love =

Shades of Love can mean:

- Shades of Love (film series), a series of made-for-television movies
- Shades of Love (band), a dance-music group in which Meli'sa Morgan sang
- Shades of Love (album), a 1977 album by Walt Dickerson
- "Shades of Love" (Casualty), a 1987 television episode
