= Artists Recording Collective =

Independent music label

- Parent company: Burnett Music Foundation
- Founded: 2007
- Founder: Chris Burnett; Erica Lindsay; Sumi Tonooka
- Distributor: CD Baby
- Genre: Various
- Country of origin: U.S.
- Official website: www.artistsrecordingcollective.biz

Artists Recording Collective (ARC) is an independent music label. Using the Internet and related technologies, it provides an alternative to the traditional recording and promotion business models. ARC is a program of the Burnett Music Foundation, a nonprofit corporation based in Kansas.

ARC was founded on December 7, 2007 by Chris Burnett, Erica Lindsay, and Sumi Tonooka, all of whom are active professional musicians, producers and educators who were motivated by the need for a professional platform for their projects. In early 2008 ARC released its first CD, Long Ago Today by jazz pianist Sumi Tonooka, with drummer Bob Braye, and bassist Rufus Reid to critical acclaim and national radio chart success.

== Business model ==
ARC is configured so that artists retain control of all aspects of their business as professional musicians. Another goal is to validate the contention that superior talent will thrive by finding its own audience when given the opportunity outside of traditional corporate filters. It puts much of the control in the hands of the listener and buyer.

The initial business model was based on the experiences of co-founder, Chris Burnett, who had been successfully promoting his own music on the Internet since the middle 1990s, first via various MIDI music networks and usegroups, then at MP3.com from 1999-2003.

== Brand ==
Artists Recording Collective has become an internationally recognized brand and notable recording label that emphasizes promoting and distributing the work of ARC members. It is now widely recognized as among the first model of its kind for the purpose of promoting artistic works through both the Internet and traditional media resources.

== Notability ==
Artists Recording Collective was featured in the March 2009 issue of Down Beat. Other articles and reviews in major print publications include: JazzTimes (US), JazzWise (UK), JAZZ PODIUM (DE), All About Jazz-New York (US), Jazz Improv NY (US). Feature articles and reviews at leading music portals and digital publications include: All About Jazz, JazzReview, All Your Jazz, eJazz News, LA Jazz, Jazz.com, and many others.

== Member artists and labels ==
Co-founding members:

- Erica Lindsay - saxophonist, composer, educator
- Sumi Tonooka - pianist, composer, educator

Some current and past member artists and labels:

- B.J. Jansen - baritone saxophonist, composer, International Woodwinds artist/endorser
- Bill Caldwell - saxophonist, composer, educator (Wichita State University)
- Christopher White - saxophonist, composer, educator (Radford University)
- Courtney Lemmon - vocalist and recording artist
- Dan Arcamone - guitarist, composer and recording artist
- Don Aliquo - saxophonist, composer, educator (Middle Tennessee State University)
- George Kahn - Los Angeles based jazz pianist and composer
- Jeff Siegel - New York based drummer and composer
- John Blake, Jr. - jazz violinist, recording artist and educator and sideman to such jazz artists as Grover Washington, Jr., McCoy Tyner among others
- Lee Shaw - Albany based pianist, composer and educator
- Zane Forshee - guitarist, composer, educator, author (Fulbright Scholar)*Mark Taylor (french horn) - recording artist and former member of Henry Threadgill ensembles
- Michael Jefry Stevens - NYC/Memphis based pianist, composer, educator and touring artist
- PM Records (Ed Bickert, Elvin Jones, Doug Riley, Bug Alley, Pat La Barbera, Bernie Senensky, Sonny Greenwich, David Liebman, Nina Simone, Steve Grossman, Kathryn Moses, Don Thompson)
- Reptet - Seattle, Washington based progressive music ensemble
- Richie Pratt - former NFL player; and professional drummer for Lionel Hampton, Broadway, Film
- Stan Kessler - Kansas City based trumpet player, composer and band leader and sideman to such artists as Karrin Allyson, Bobby Watson among others
- Toni Gates - Kansas City based vocalist
- Trace Elements - San Francisco based ensemble
- Will Matthews (musician) - guitarist for the Count Basie Orchestra
