= Impressions of a Patch of Blue =

Studio album by Walt Dickerson Quartet and Sun Ra
- Released: 1966
- Recorded: 1965
- Genre: Jazz
- Length: 35:21
- Label: MGM
- Producer: Tom Wilson

Walt Dickerson chronology
Walt Dickerson Plays Unity (1964)	Impressions of a Patch of Blue (1966)	Tell Us Only the Beautiful Things (1974)

Professional ratings
Review scores
Source	Rating
Allmusic	link

Impressions of a Patch of Blue is a 1966 album by vibraphonist Walt Dickerson with keyboardist Sun Ra in a rare appearance as a sideman. It is based on themes from Jerry Goldsmith's score for the film A Patch of Blue (1965) starring Sidney Poitier. Sun Ra plays the harpsichord, an instrument rarely used in a jazz setting. It is the last album Dickerson recorded before his decade long sabbatical from jazz before his comeback in the mid-1970s.

== Track listing ==
1. "A Patch of Blue (Part 1)"
2. "A Patch of Blue (Part 2)"
3. "Bacon & Eggs"
4. "High Hopes"
5. "Alone in the Dark (Part 1)"
6. "Alone in the Dark (Part 2)"
7. "Selina's Fantasy"
8. "Thataway"

== Personnel ==
- Walt Dickerson – vibraphone
- Sun Ra – piano, harpsichord, celeste
- Bob Cunningham – bass
- Roger Blank – drums
