= Sirone's Concord =

Studio album by Sirone
- Released: 2003
- Recorded: June 10 and 24, 2003
- Studio: Das Tonstudio 24, Berlin
- Genre: Free jazz
- Label: Not Two Records; MW 751-2

Sirone chronology
Life Rays (1982)	Sirone's Concord (2003)	Live (2005)

Sirone's Concord is an album by bassist Sirone, his second as a leader. It was recorded in June, 2003, at Das Tonstudio 24 in Berlin, and was released later that year by Not Two Records. On the album, Sirone is joined by saxophonist Ben Abarbanel-Wolff, violinist Ulli Bartel, and drummer Maurice de Martin. Sirone's Concord was the bassist's first album under his own name in over 23 years, his previous release being Artistry (Of The Cosmos, 1979).

== Reception ==
In a review for Paris Transatlantic, Dan Warburton stated that "one wonders why on earth we didn't hear more of" Sirone since his previous release as a leader, and wrote that the playing on the album is "solid and convincing without being flashy." He commented: "It all flows effortlessly, and manages to be constantly engaging, even passionate, without ever going overboard... European concert promoters who fall over themselves to book acts from New York... should turn their gaze to the east and sign these boys up fast."

Ken Waxman, writing for Jazz Word, stated that Concord demonstrates that "the bassist is most comfortable as a rhythm rock and accompanist." He remarked: "The compositions he wrote for the date illustrate his strength – and each gives his young quartet members ample solo space."

== Track listing ==
All compositions by Sirone.

1. "Aisha's Serenade" – 10:41
2. "You are not alone but we are few" – 7:34
3. "For all we don't know" – 10:19
4. "Swingin' on a string of things / For Albert" – 7:54
5. "You are not alone but we are few / Reprise" – 5:40

== Personnel ==
- Ben Abarbanel-Wolff – saxophone
- Ulli Bartel – violin
- Sirone – bass
- Maurice de Martin – drums
