= Walt Dickerson 1976 =

Studio album by Walt Dickerson
- Released: 1976
- Recorded: 1976
- Studio: Frank Virtue Studio, Philadelphia, PA
- Genre: Jazz
- Length: 42:09
- Label: Whynot; MTCJ-2009
- Producer: Masahiko Yuh

Walt Dickerson chronology
Peace (1976)	Walt Dickerson 1976 (1976)	Serendipity (1977)

Walt Dickerson 1976 is an album by vibraphonist Walt Dickerson recorded in 1976 for the Japanese Whynot label.

== Track listing ==
All compositions by Walt Dickerson except where noted.

1. "Sky" – 10:17
2. "Awareness" – 4:29
3. "Keys of Wisdom" – 5:59
4. "Yesterdays" (Jerome Kern, Otto Harbach) – 9:24
5. "I Love You" (Cole Porter) – 12:00

== Personnel ==
- Walt Dickerson – vibraphone
- Wilbur Ware – bass (tracks 3–5)
- Jamaaladeen Tacuma – electric bass (track 1)
- Edgar Bateman – drums (tracks 1 & 3–5)
