= Relativity (Walt Dickerson album) =

Studio album by Walt Dickerson
- Released: 1962
- Recorded: January 16, 1962
- Studio: Van Gelder Studio, Englewood Cliffs, New Jersey
- Genre: Jazz
- Length: 34:24
- Label: New Jazz; NJLP 8275
- Producer: Esmond Edwards

Walt Dickerson chronology
A Sense of Direction (1961)	Relativity (1962)	To My Queen (1962)

Relativity is an album led by vibraphonist and composer Walt Dickerson which was recorded in 1962 and released on the New Jazz label.

== Reception ==
Professional ratings
Review scores
Source	Rating
Allmusic	4/5 stars
Down Beat	4/5 stars
The Penguin Guide to Jazz Recordings	3.5/4 stars

The Allmusic reviewer stated: "If there is a flaw with Relativity, it's that it doesn't have quite the same spark of revelation as Dickerson's first two albums; critics were beginning to identify his brief note clusters and stop-start phrasing as stylistic trademarks, and aside from the duet with Abdul-Malik, the record doesn't really push Dickerson's sound into new territory. Still, taken independently of context, Relativity is another fine recording and one of the better pieces of Dickerson's underappreciated legacy". Down Beat reviewer Don DeMichael wrote: "This third Dickerson album, like the first two, offers excitement, emotional experience, and music of high quality. ...this is a very good album and is heartily recommended for the sometime electrifying emotion Dickerson is able to generate."

== Track listing ==
All compositions by Walt Dickerson except where noted

1. "Relativity" - 5:20
2. "It Ain't Necessarily So" (George Gershwin, Ira Gershwin) - 4:25
3. "I Can't Get Started" (Vernon Duke, I. Gershwin) - 5:05
4. "Steppin' Out" - 2:05
5. "The Unknown" - 3:59
6. "Sugar Lump" - 6:05
7. "Autumn in New York" (Duke) - 7:25

== Personnel ==
- Walt Dickerson – vibraphone
- Austin Crowe – piano
- Ahmed Abdul-Malik – bass
- Andrew Cyrille – drums
