= Easy to Love (Roland Hanna album) =

Studio album by Roland Hanna
- Released: 1960
- Recorded: September 25, 1959
- Studio: New York City, NY
- Genre: Jazz
- Length: 37:20
- Label: ATCO; SD 33-121
- Producer: Gary Kramer, Nesuhi Ertegun

Roland Hanna chronology
Destry Rides Again (1959)	Easy to Love (1960)	Child of Gemini (1971)

Easy to Love (surtitled The Piano of Roland Hanna) is an album by pianist Roland Hanna recorded in 1959 and released by the ATCO label early the following year.

Professional ratings
Review scores
Source	Rating
AllMusic	4/5 stars
The Penguin Guide to Jazz Recordings	3/4 stars

== Track listing ==
1. "The Best Things in Life Are Free" (Ray Henderson, Buddy DeSylva, Lew Brown) – 4:03
2. "Next Time You See Me" (Ben Tucker) – 5:04
3. "From This Day On" (Leigh Harline, Mort Greene) – 4:38
4. "Like Someone in Love" (Jimmy Van Heusen, Johnny Burke) – 4:27
5. "Yesterdays" (Jerome Kern, Otto Harbach) – 4:09
6. "Farouk Thelonious" (Tucker) – 3:40
7. "It Never Entered My Mind" (Richard Rodgers, Lorenz Hart) – 4:03
8. "Easy to Love" (Cole Porter) – 3:37
9. "Night in Tunisia" (Dizzy Gillespie, Frank Paparelli) – 3:08

== Personnel ==
- Roland Hanna – piano
- Ben Tucker – bass
- Roy Burnes – drums
