= Serendipity (Walt Dickerson album) =

Live album by Walt Dickerson Trio
- Released: 1977
- Recorded: August 11, 1976
- Venues: Players Palace, Philadelphia, PA
- Genre: Jazz
- Length: 60:01
- Labels: SteepleChase; SCS 1070
- Producer: Nils Winther

Walt Dickerson chronology
Walt Dickerson 1976 (1976)	Serendipity (1977)	Divine Gemini (1977)

Serendipity is a live album recorded by composer and vibraphonist Walt Dickerson in Philadelphia in 1976 for the SteepleChase label.

== Reception ==
Professional ratings
Review scores
Source	Rating
Allmusic	4/5 stars
The Penguin Guide to Jazz Recordings	3/4 stars

Allmusic reviewer Stewart Mason said "Serendipity is a stunner for fans of Dickerson's more out-there sets".

== Track listing ==
All compositions by Walt Dickerson

1. "My Prayer" - 5:34
2. "Magnificent Glimps" - 14:55
3. "Serendipity" - 10:48
4. "This Way, Please" - 13:53
5. "Inner View" - 14:51 Bonus track on CD reissue

== Personnel ==
- Walt Dickerson - vibraphone
- Rudy McDaniel - electric bass
- Edgar Bateman - drums
