= Landscape with Open Door =

Studio album by Pierre Dørge & Walt Dickerson
- Released: 1979
- Recorded: September 30, 1978
- Studio: Sweet Silence Studios, Copenhagen, Denmark
- Genre: Jazz
- Length: 47:38
- Label: SteepleChase; SCS 1115
- Producer: Nils Winther

Pierre Dørge chronology
Landscape with Open Door (1979)	Ballad Round the Left Corner (1979)

Walt Dickerson chronology
Visions (1978)	Landscape with Open Door (1978)	I Hear You John (1978)

Landscape with Open Door is an album by guitarist Pierre Dørge and vibraphonist Walt Dickerson recorded in 1978 for the SteepleChase label.

== Reception ==
Professional ratings
Review scores
Source	Rating
Allmusic	3/5 stars
The Penguin Guide to Jazz Recordings	3/4 stars

Allmusic gave the album 3 stars.

== Track listing ==
All compositions by Pierre Dørge.

1. "Song for Irene" – 1:06
2. "Tribute to Master Tchicai" – 4:08
3. "Landscape with Open Door" – 10:37
4. "Mirjam's Blue Umbrella" – 1:49
5. "Bossa Kodania" – 4:58
6. "Green Symmetry/Witches Weep and Dance" – 17:42
7. "Tai-Gong" – 7:18

== Personnel ==
- Pierre Dørge – guitar, percussion
- Walt Dickerson – vibraphone, percussion
