= Pierre Dørge =

Danish avant-garde jazz guitarist

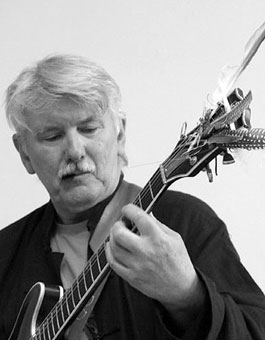

Background information
- Born: 28 February 1946 (age 79); Copenhagen, Denmark
- Genres: Avant-garde jazz
- Occupations: Musician, composer
- Instruments: Guitar, percussion
- Website: newjungleorchestra.com

Pierre Dørge (born 28 February 1946) is a Danish avant-garde jazz guitarist. As leader of the New Jungle Orchestra, he combined traditional and modern jazz with West African Highlife guitar music. Among his collaborators have been his wife, pianist Irene Becker, saxophonist John Tchicai, bassist Johnny Dyani, and percussionist Marilyn Mazur.

== Career ==
A native of Copenhagen, Dørge belonged to a free-jazz big band from 1969 to 1971 that was led by John Tchicai. As leader of Thermaenius in 1978, he borrowed from Balkan folk music. Two years later, he led the New Jungle Orchestra, borrowing from African styles. He has worked with Johnny Dyani, Khan Jamal, David Murray, and Don Cherry.

== Discography ==
- Landscape with Open Door with Walt Dickerson (SteepleChase, 1979)
- Ballad Round the Left Corner (SteepleChase, 1980)
- Copenhagen Boogie (CBS, 1982)
- Ball at Louisiana Museum of Modern Art with John Tchicai (SteepleChase, 1983)
- Brikama (SteepleChase, 1984)
- Even the Moon Is Dancing (SteepleChase, 1985)
- Johnny Lives (SteepleChase, 1987)
- La Luna with Irene Becker, Morten Carlsen (Olufsen, 1987)
- Live in Denmark with Jan Kaspersen (Olufsen, 1988)
- Peer Gynt (Olufsen, 1989)
- Different Places Different Bananas (Olufsen, 1989)
- Echoez Of... with Harry Beckett (Olufsen, 1990)
- Live in Chicago (Olufsen, 1991)
- Karawane (Olufsen, 1994)
- The Jazzpar Prize (Enja, 1992)
- Bryllupsfotografen (The Wedding Photographer) with Irene Becker (Olufsen, 1994
- Absurd Bird (Olufsen, 1995)
- The Olufsen Years 1-4: Different Places Different Bananas (Olufsen, 1989), Peer Gynt (Olufsen, 1989), Live in Chicago (Olufsen, 1991), Karawane (Olufsen, 1994), Absurd Bird (Olufsen, 1995) (SteepleChase, 2010)
- Music from the Danish Jungle (Dacapo, 1996)
- China Jungle (Dacapo, 1997)
- Chinese Compass (Dacapo, 1999)
- Zig Zag Zimfoni (Stunt, 2001)
- Hope is Bright Green Up North with John Tchicai, Lou Grassi (CIMP, 2003)
- Live at Birdland (Stunt, 2003)
- Dancing Cheek to Cheek (Stunt, 2004)
- Jazz is Like a Banana (SteepleChase, 2007)
- Whispering Elephants (SteepleChase, 2008)
- Kryss with Færd, Irene Becker, Julie Hjetland (Tutl, 2008)
- Pierre Dorge Presents New Jungle Orchestra (SteepleChase, 2010)
- Sketches of India (SteepleChase, 2011)
- Like Salamanders We Survive with Torben Westergaard, Tyshawn Sorey (TW Musik, 2013)
- Blui (SteepleChase, 2015)
- Ubi Zaa (SteepleChase, 2016)
- Soundscapes (SteepleChase, 2018)
- Bluu Afroo (SteepleChase, 2020)

=== As sideman ===
- Kristian Blak, Antifonale (Tutl, 1987)
- Povl Dissing, Over Adskillige Graenser... (Rosen, 1988)
- Povl Dissing, Zoo Sange (Olufsen, 1996)
- Johnny Dyani, Grand Mother's Teaching (Jam, 1982)
- Johnny Dyani, Born Under the Heat (Dragon, 1996)
- Doudou Gouirand, Mouvements Naturels (JAM, 1982)
- Doudou Gouirand, Chanting & Dancing Live at Zurich Jazz Festival (Jam, 1985)
- Doudou Gouirand, Forgotten Tales Vent Du (Sud, 1985)
- Khan Jamal, Three (SteepleChase, 1985)
- Butch Morris, Homeing (Sound Aspects, 1989)
- John Tchicai, Afrodisiaca (MPS, 1969)
- John Tchicai, Real Tchicai (SteepleChase, 1977)

== See also ==
- List of experimental big bands
