= New York Jazz Quartet =

American jazz band

The New York Jazz Quartet was founded by pianist Roland Hanna. Initially consisting of flautist Hubert Laws, bassist Ron Carter, and drummer Billy Cobham, the lineup changed in 1974 to Frank Wess, bassist George Mraz, and drummer Ben Riley. Richie Pratt and Grady Tate also contributed to the group. The group recorded for the Inner City, Enja, Salvation and Sonet Records from 1972 to 1982.

== Discography ==
- In Concert In Japan with Ron Carter, Ben Riley, Frank Wess (Salvation, 1975)
- Song of the Black Knight with George Mraz, Richard Pratt, Frank Wess (Sonet, 1977)
- Surge with George Mraz, Richard Pratt, Frank Wess (Enja, 1977)
- Blues for Sarka with George Mraz, Grady Tate, Frank Wess (Enja, 1978)
- New York Jazz Quartet in Chicago with George Mraz, Ben Riley, Frank Wess (Bee Hive, 1981)
- Oasis with George Mraz, Ben Riley, Frank Wess (Enja, 1981)
