= Walt Dickerson Plays Unity =

Studio album by Walt Dickerson
- Released: 1964
- Recorded: March 5, 1964; New York City
- Genre: Jazz
- Length: 34:03
- Label: Audio Fidelity; AFSD 6131
- Producer: Herman D. Gimbel

Walt Dickerson chronology
Jazz Impressions of Lawrence of Arabia (1963)	Walt Dickerson Plays Unity (1964)	Impressions of a Patch of Blue (1966)

Walt Dickerson Plays Unity is an album led by vibraphonist and composer Walt Dickerson recorded in 1964 and released on the Audio Fidelity label.

== Reception ==
Professional ratings
Review scores
Source	Rating
Allmusic	4.5/5 stars
Down Beat	3/5 stars

The Allmusic site awarded the album 4½ stars. The DownBeat reviewer stated: "Unity is a brooding, darkly moody excursion into tonal and rhythmic (both drummers play simultaneously) impressionism. The trouble is that it never gets beyond the immediate impressionistic moment into a larger design above and beyond the performances".

== Track listing ==
All compositions by Walt Dickerson and Sidney Frey.

1. "Unity" - 16:23
2. "High Moon" - 17:40

== Personnel ==
- Walt Dickerson – vibraphone
- Walter Davis, Jr. – piano
- George Tucker – bass
- Edgar Bateman, Andrew Cyrille – drums
