= Roy Burns (drummer) =

American drummer (1935–2018)

- Born: November 30, 1935; Emporia, KS
- Died: May 2, 2018
- Genres: Jazz, funk, rock
- Occupation(s): drummer, author, instrument accessory manufacturer
- Instrument: drum kit
- Years active: 1952-2012

Roy Burns (November 30, 1935 – May 2, 2018) was an American drummer, teacher, and percussion manufacturer.

== Career ==
Burns was born in Emporia, Kansas. Louie Bellson heard him play in Kansas City and advised him to study in New York City. In August 1955, at the age of 20, Burns left Kansas with $300 and a drum set to study drumming in New York City. Within a year, he was Woody Herman's drummer. Shortly after, he left to join Benny Goodman's band, which was having a resurgence due to the film The Benny Goodman Story (1956). In 1958, Burns was with Goodman's band as they toured Europe and recorded several albums at the Brussels World's Fair.

In 1960, he was a teacher and studio musician with the NBC Orchestra, The Merv Griffin Show, and The Tonight Show. From 1968 to 1980, he worked for the Rogers Drum Company and traveled the world as a clinician. For nine years, during the 1970s, he was the house drummer for the Monterey Jazz Festival.

In 1980, he began writing a column in Modern Drummer magazine which ran until 1992. In 1980, he and Ron Marquez started Aquarian Accessories to manufacture percussion equipment.

Burns is a member of the Percussive Arts Society Hall of Fame. Burns died on May 2, 2018, at the age of 82.

== Discography ==
=== As leader ===
- Skin Burns (Roulette, 1963)
- Big, Bad & Beautiful (FPM, 1973)

=== As sideman ===
- Roland Hanna, Destry Rides Again (ATCO, 1959)
- Roland Hanna, Easy to Love (ATCO, 1960)
- Chubby Jackson, Chubby Jackson Discovers Maria Marshall (Crown, 1961)
- Charlie Shavers, Girl of My Dreams (Everest, 1960)

== Bibliography ==
- Developing Finger Control (1958) with Lewis Malin
- Elementary Drum Method (1961)
- Intermediate Drum Method (1967) with Sandy Feldstein
- Studio Funk Drumming (1981) With Joey Farris
- Elementary Rock and Roll Drumming (1985) with Howard Halpern
- New Orleans Drumming (1990) With Joey Farris
- One Surface Learning (1995) With Joey Farris
- Advanced Rock Drumming (1997)
- Relaxed Hand Technique (2012)
- Solo Secrets of the Left Hand and bass drum (2012)
- The Creative Drum Set Workbook (2012)
- Single Strokes Made Easy: A Drummer’s Approach for Developing Speed and Endurance (2018)
