= Divine Gemini =

Studio album by Walt Dickerson and Richard Davis
- Released: 1978
- Recorded: February 9, 1977
- Studios: C.I., NYC
- Genre: Jazz
- Length: 33:48
- Labels: SteepleChase; SCS 1089
- Producer: Nils Winther

Walt Dickerson chronology
| Serendipity (1977) | Divine Gemini (1978) | Tenderness (1977) |

Richard Davis chronology
| Fancy Free (1977) | Divine Gemini (1977) | Tenderness (1977) |

Divine Gemini is an album of duets by vibraphonist Walt Dickerson and bassist Richard Davis, recorded in 1977 for the SteepleChase label.

== Reception ==
Professional ratings
Review scores
| Source | Rating |
|---|---|
| AllMusic | 4/5 stars |
| The Penguin Guide to Jazz Recordings | 3/4 stars |

The Globe and Mail wrote that "Richard Davis here alters the context just enough to put Dickerson's rather small world of pensive, psychologically intense music in a new and still interesting perspective."

== Track listing ==
All compositions by Walt Dickerson

1. "Lucille" – 12:33
2. "Divine Gemini" – 4:02
3. "Always Positive" – 2:49
4. "Her Intuition" – 14:24

== Personnel ==
- Walt Dickerson – vibraphone
- Richard Davis – bass
