= Tributaries: Reflections on Tommy Flanagan =

Studio album by Sir Roland Hanna
- Released: September 30, 2003
- Recorded: June 2002
- Studio: SUNY Performing Arts Center, Purchase, NY
- Genre: Jazz
- Length: 64:48
- Label: IPO; IPOC1004
- Producer: William F. Sorin

Sir Roland Hanna chronology
Everything I Love (2002)	Tributaries: Reflections on Tommy Flanagan (2003)	Après Un Rêve (2003)

Tributaries: Reflections on Tommy Flanagan is a solo album by pianist Sir Roland Hanna performing compositions associated with Tommy Flanagan recorded in 2002 and released by IPO Recordings.

== Reception ==
Professional ratings
Review scores
Source	Rating
AllMusic	4.5/5 stars
Tom Hull	A−
The Penguin Guide to Jazz Recordings	3/4 stars

In his "Jazz Consumer Guide" for The Village Voice, Tom Hull said of this recording: "All of Hanna's solo albums are thoughtful, but his fellow Detroiter sets the bar higher than ever." In another commentary published on his website, he said, "both were meticulous craftsmen, and were especially adroit accompanists. This is solo, of course. The subject and the extra care raise it a bit above Hanna's usual high standard."

AllMusic reviewer Scott Yanow stated, "It is difficult to believe in listening to Tributaries: Reflections on Tommy Flanagan, a solo recital by Sir Roland Hanna, that the pianist passed away just five months later. Hanna's tribute to the recently deceased Flanagan is so full of life, creativity, and swing. ... [E]very selection on this set is well worth hearing. There can be little doubt after hearing this highly recommended CD that Hanna was very much in his playing prime up until the end of his productive life."

== Track listing ==
All compositions by Tommy Flanagan except where noted

1. "Sea Changes" – 4:22
2. "A Child Is Born" (Thad Jones) – 6:50
3. "Body and Soul" (Johnny Green, Frank Eyton, Edward Heyman, Robert Sour) – 8:28
4. "Soon" (George Gershwin, Ira Gershwin) – 4:43
5. "Things Ain't What They Used to Be" (Mercer Ellington) – 5:29
6. "Never Let Me Go" (Jay Livingston, Ray Evans) – 7:00
7. "The Cup Bearers" (Tom McIntosh) – 7:25
8. "'Tis" (Jones) – 4:33
9. "I Concentrate on You" (Cole Porter) – 6:37
10. "Robin's Nest" (Illinois Jacquet, Bob Russell, Sir Charles Thompson) – 4:03
11. "Delarna" – 5:18

== Personnel ==
- Sir Roland Hanna – piano
