= Sir Elf =

Studio album by Roland Hanna
- Released: 1973
- Recorded: April 1973
- Studio: Nola Recording Studios, New York City, NY
- Genre: Jazz
- Length: 57:11 CD reissue with additional tracks
- Label: Choice; CRS 1003
- Producer: Gerry Macdonald

Roland Hanna chronology
Child of Gemini (1960)	Sir Elf (1973)	The New Heritage Keyboard Quartet (1974)

Sir Elf is a solo piano album by Roland Hanna recorded in New York in 1973 and released by the Choice label.

== Reception ==
Professional ratings
Review scores
Source	Rating
AllMusic	4.5/5 stars

AllMusic reviewer Scott Yanow stated: "Pianist Roland Hanna's first solo album is one of his finest recordings. ... Hanna is in top form on this well-paced and inventive set".

== Track listing ==
1. "Yours Is My Heart Alone" (Franz Lehár) – 6:56
2. "Night of My Nights" (Alexander Borodin, Robert Wright, George Forrest) – 3:27
3. "You Took Advantage of Me" (Richard Rodgers, Lorenz Hart) – 4:57
4. "Killing Me Softly with His Song" (Charles Fox, Norman Gimbel) – 5:09
5. "There Is No Greater Love" (Isham Jones, Marty Symes) – 5:56
6. "Morning" (Roland Hanna) – 6:36
7. "Walkin'" (Richard Carpenter) – 4:15
8. "Bye Bye Blackbird" (Ray Henderson, Mort Dixon) – 2:47
9. "Back Home in Indiana" (Hanna) – 4:20 Additional track on CD reissue
10. "If You Could See Me Now" (Tadd Dameron) – 6:15 Additional track on CD reissue
11. "This Is All I Ask" (Gordon Jenkins) – 6:33 Additional track on CD reissue

== Personnel ==
- Roland Hanna – piano
