= Richie Pratt =

American jazz drummer (1943–2015)

Background information
- Born: Richard Dean Tyree; March 11, 1943; Olathe, Kansas, United States
- Died: February 12, 2015 (aged 71) Leavenworth, Kansas, United States
- Genres: Jazz, Broadway, bebop, hard bop
- Occupation(s): Musician, bandleader, composer, sideman
- Instrument(s): Drums, Percussion, Piano
- Years active: 1961–2011
- Labels: Artists Recording Collective; Enja; CBS; Timeless; Arista; Hip-O; Atlantic; Columbia; A&M Records; SONY; RCA
- Website: RichiePratt.net

Richie Pratt (born Richard Dean Tyree; March 11, 1943 – February 12, 2015) was an American jazz drummer. He embarked upon a career as a professional musician on the New York scene in the early 1970s, it was as much due to an unanticipated sporting injury as anything else. Pratt was born into a musical family (his mother was a church pianist and a brother is saxophonist Chris Burnett) and grew up in the Kansas City metro city of Olathe, Kansas. He first studied music via the piano, as well as attended various music camps as a youth prior to attending college as a music major at the University of Kansas.

== Early life and football career ==
Pratt was born at the University of Kansas Medical Center to Wayne Tyree and Violet Lorraine Jackson Tyree, then later adopted by his great-aunt and great-uncle, John and Willa Pratt, in the Kansas City area. Eventually growing into a rather large and powerful man, he attended the University of Kansas under a full four-year scholarship to play varsity football, majoring in music education. While enrolled in school and living in Lawrence, Kansas he would not only block for Pro Football Hall of Fame running back Gale Sayers as an All-Time KU Football Letterman, but Pratt also continued his musical development. He performed in orchestra, jazz and wind ensembles, along with performing in a student USO show that first took him to Hawaii as a performer. He was eventually drafted to play professional football by the NFL’s New York Giants.

== Music career ==
Richie Pratt’s prolific tenure as a first-call percussionist on the highly competitive New York City music scene began after he suffered a career-ending injury during his second season with the Giants. His professional tenure as a musician in New York actually began while he was employed as a host at the famed Village Gate.

Pratt began sitting in with Jaki Byard and word began to spread about the big guy from the Midwest who played drums. Bassist Major Holley eventually invited Pratt to jam on Sundays at Jacques, which resulted in Junior Mance hearing him play drums and offering him his first paid gig as a drummer in New York. He was sponsored into the American Federation of Musicians, Local 802, by pianist Ahmad Jamal, and eventually worked significantly as a studio session musician, contractor and sideman in numerous contexts.

Initially described in the New York press as a "bubbling cauldron of musical vitality", Pratt subsequently added musical diversity to his cauldron by performing with the American Symphony Orchestra, the Joffrey Ballet, Alvin Ailey; in the Broadway hits: Ain't Supposed to Die a Natural Death; Dude; Raisin; and notably, Pratt was the drum soloist in Broadway's smashing tribute to Duke Ellington, Sophisticated Ladies.

In the traditional jazz arena, Pratt spent over three years as a member of the New York Jazz Quartet, which included Sir Roland Hanna, Frank Wess, and George Mraz. Pratt also accompanied Billy Taylor, Milt Jackson, Milton Hinton, Frank Foster, Monty Alexander, Michel Legrand, Lionel Hampton, Benny Goodman, and Benny Carter among others. The lightness and sensitivity of his drumming has enhanced such legendary vocalists as: Nancy Wilson, Aretha Franklin, Marlena Shaw, Barry White, Melba Moore, the Temptations, Della Reese, Johnny Hartman, Carol Sloane, and Johnny Desmond as well.

Pratt was based in Honolulu, Hawaii, upon leaving New York City and continued to be an active performer on the local Honolulu music scene, as well as co-founding and contributing to establishing such local groups as Honolulu Jazz Quartet. Pratt also often worked with touring artists, such as the Russian-born trumpeter, Valery Ponomarev, who make the Hawaiian islands part of their itineraries.

He signed with the Kansas City-based new concept music label Artists Recording Collective in 2007. The commercial and formal record label affiliated debut release as a leader of his own original music on compact disc (ARC-2093) took over 20 years to be realized. His album entitled Olathe is available worldwide at all of the major retailers such as iTunes, Amazon.com and CD Baby.

On October 6, 2012, Pratt returned home to the mainland to live in the midwest and remained based permanently in his native Kansas City metropolitan area.

He died at his home on February 12, 2015.

== Discography ==
=== As Leader ===
- Olathe (Artists Recording Collective, 2007)

=== As sideman ===
With Frank Foster

- The Loud Minority (Mainstream, 1972)

With Carol Sloan

- Out of the Blue (Columbia)

With Lionel Hampton

- LIONEL HAMPTON AND HIS BIG BAND - OUTRAGEOUS (Timeless)
- LIONEL HAMPTON & HIS GIANTS OF JAZZ 1979 (Timeless)
- HAMP PRESENTS WOODY HERMAN (Timeless)
- HAMP IN HAARLEM (Timeless)

With Aretha Franklin

- Hey Now Hey (The Other Side of the Sky) (Atlantic, 1973)

With Sir Roland Hanna

- Time for the Dancers (Progressive, 1977)

With New York Jazz Quartet

- Song of The Black Knight with George Mraz, Richard Pratt, Frank Wess, 1977
- Surge with George Mraz, Richard Pratt, Frank Wess, 1977

With Phyllis Hyman

- One on One (Hip-O, 1998)
- The Legacy of Phyllis Hyman (Arista, 1996)

With Carrie Smith

- Only You Can Do It (GP, 1982)

On Broadway

- Ain't Supposed to Die a Natural Death (A&M Records, Original Cast Album, 1971)
- Raisin (musical) (SONY Broadway, Original Cast Album, 1973)
- Sophisticated Ladies (RCA, Original Cast Album, 1981)

Off Broadway

- Taking My Turn (Original Cast Album, 1982)
