= Doudou Gouirand =

French jazz saxophonist and composer (born 1940)

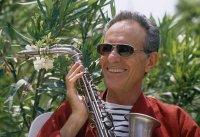
- Gouirand holding a saxophone

Background information
- Birth name: Gérard Gouirand
- Born: April 28, 1940 (age 84)
- Origin: Nice, Côte d'Azur, France
- Genres: Jazz, World music
- Occupation(s): Saxophonist, Composer
- Website: http://doudougouirand.com

Doudou Gouirand (born April 28, 1940) is a French jazz saxophonist and composer.

== Early career ==
Gouirand was living in Sweden when he met the great trumpeter and composer Don Cherry, who gave him the opportunity to study and work with him in Sweden and Scandinavia and eventually throughout Europe. This experience developed Gouirand's interest in and knowledge of Indian and African music, and World music in general. Cherry's interest in Ornette Coleman led Gouirand to become interested in improvised music as well.

Working with Cherry gave Gouirand the opportunity to meet J. M’Bizo Dyani, Okay Temiz, Trilok Gurtu, Djaya-Deva, Bobo Stenson, and Palle Danielsson, some of whom he worked with later in his career. This musical experience and his Latin and Mediterranean roots inspired Gouirand to meld his Mediterranean culture with contemporary jazz.

When Gouirand returned to France in the late 1970s, he worked for a period of time with Okay Temiz's "Oriental Wind" and Brazilian singer-songwriters Teca and Ricardo.

== Recording and composing ==
Gouirand then began to compose and record regularly, first for JAM. His first album, Islands (1981), featured Chris Mc Gregor on piano. In 1982, Gouirand appeared on Dyani's album Grand Mother's Teaching, a selection of music with jazz and South African roots.

The albums Mouvements Naturels (1982) and Chanting & Dancing (1985) were recorded with his new group World Music Company, and feature Pierre Dorge, Johnny Dyani, Sangoma Everett and Cheikh Tidiane Fall. Gouirand recorded Forgotten Tales (VDS/52° rue, 1986), an album of original material which features Don Cherry. This record was re-issued in November 2000 by Great Winds/Musea.

During the following years, Gouirand explored new directions with Space (VDS/52° rue), a trio album with Mal Waldron on piano and Michel Marre on trumpet, then La Nuit de Wounded Knee (Blue Line, 1990) with Bobo Stenson, Aldo Romano and Palle Danielsson—dedicated to native Americans, and Le Matin d'un Fauve (AA/WMD, 1994) again with Mal Waldron and Michel Marre.

With the very successful Nino Rota/Fellini album (Deux Z/Harmonia Mundi, 1995), acclaimed arrangement and composition work done around Nino Rota's film music, he explored a more European and typically Mediterranean idiom, while keeping a lot of improvisation. Between 1996 and 1998, he toured in France and Switzerland with "Third Dimension", a trio with Mal Waldron and vocalist Jeanne Lee. The group did not release any recordings. His album Passages (June 1999, distributed by Harmonia Mundi) features Rita Marcotulli, JJ Avenel, J. Allouche, plus Elise Caron (vocals) and Kevin Davy (trumpet).

Gouirand has presented a number of special projects, including one based on the compositions of Nino Rota, a project built around Lapland music with singer Inga Yuuso, and various works with African musicians.

== Recent activities ==
Les Saisons du Paradis, an ode to Provence with original music and texts from Jean Giono, was produced in 2000-2002.

Associated improvisers Garrigues-Sahel, a stage project including traditional African musicians and French jazz improvisers in September 1999, led to the 2000 record project Les Racines du Ciel (BMG, May 2002), with the subsequent stage group "Indigo Song".

In 2006 he issued a record with the group "Aumja", an attempt to mix creative aspects from Indian and Mediterranean music which included a set of new personal compositions. The group was co-led with sitar player Brigitte Menon.

In 2007, he published Boleros, a project that was prepared a year in advance and recorded on his second trip to Santiago de Cuba, where he blends his saxophone with the traditional and modern Bolero and Nueva Trova.

Gouirand has performed extensively in concert and at festivals in France and worldwide with Don Cherry, Mal Waldron, Jeanne Lee, J. M’Bizo Dyani, Pierre Dorge, Palle Danielsson, Bobo Stenson, Aldo Romano, and also with Paul Bley, Jim Pepper, Dino Saluzzi, and Lester Bowie.

== Selected discography ==
- Islands (1981), with Chris Mc Gregor, Michel Benita, J.C. Montredon and Lelle Kullgren
- Mouvements naturels (1982), with Johny Dyani, M. Benita, JC Montredon, Merzak Mouthana, Pierre Dorge
- Chanting & Dancing (1985), live with J. Dyani, Pierre Dorge, Sangoma Everett, Cheikh Tidiane Fall
- Space (1985) with Mal Waldron and Michel Marre (VDS/52e rue Est), CD VDS/Media 7 (1987)
- La nuit de Wounded Knee (1990), with Bobo Stenson, Palle Danielsson, Aldo Romano (Blue Line)
- Nino Rota/Fellini (1995, Deux Z), in collaboration with Gérard Pansanel
- Le Matin d’un Fauve (1995, AA records), with Mal Waldron and Michel Marre
- Passages (1999, Deux Z), with Rita Marcotulli, Jean-Jacques Avenel, Joël Allouche, Kevin Davy and Elise Caron
- Indigo Song - Les Racines du Ciel (2002, RDC/Plume/BMG), with Cheikh Tidiane Seck, Baptiste Trotignon, G. Pansanel, Hadja Kouyate, Yakhouba Sissoko, Ali Boulo Santo, Moriba Koita, A. Wague, S. Everett, J.J. Avenel, Kevin Davy, Pinise Saul, Pibo Marques, Marcia Escoffery, Samir Toukour
- Mythologies (2006), with Brigitte Menon and Aumja (DOM Disques)
- Boleros (2007), recorded in Santiago de Cuba.
