= Duke Ellington Piano Solos =

Studio album by Sir Roland Hanna
- Released: 1991
- Recorded: March 22 & 23, 1990
- Studio: BMG Studios, New York City, NY
- Genre: Jazz
- Length: 45:40
- Label: MusicMasters; 5045-2
- Producer: John Snyder

Sir Roland Hanna chronology
Memoir (1990)	Duke Ellington Piano Solos (1991)	Plays Gershwin (1993)

Duke Ellington Piano Solos is a solo album by jazz pianist Sir Roland Hanna performing compositions by Duke Ellington recorded in 1990 and released by the MusicMasters label.

== Reception ==
Professional ratings
Review scores
Source	Rating
AllMusic	4.5/5 stars

AllMusic reviewer Stephen Cook stated: "For lovers of solo jazz piano, this Roland Hanna disc offers one of the most consistently enjoyable 46 minutes of music to be heard. ... Hanna finely works the subtle phrasing and singing tone he once plied in Mingus' band and perfected on many solo outings during the '70s and '80s. ... Bolstered by excellent sound, this top-notch set is a must for Hanna enthusiasts and highly recommended to all fans of straight-ahead jazz".

== Track listing ==
All compositions by Duke Ellington, except where indicated.

1. "In My Solitude" – 5:07
2. "Something to Live For" (Ellington, Billy Strayhorn) – 4:45
3. "In a Sentimental Mood" – 3:38
4. "A Portrait of Bert Williams" – 2:44
5. "Warm Valley" – 5:14
6. "Isfahan" (Strayhorn) – 1:57
7. "Single Petal of a Rose" – 4:37
8. "I Got It Bad (and That Ain't Good)" – 7:00
9. "Reflections in D" – 4:03
10. "Come Sunday" – 2:25
11. "Caravan" (Ellington, Juan Tizol, Irving Mills) – 4:10

== Personnel ==
- Sir Roland Hanna – piano
