= Erica Lindsay =

American jazz saxophonist and composer

- Born: June 5, 1955 (age 70); San Francisco, California, United States
- Genres: Jazz
- Occupation: Musician
- Instrument: saxophone
- Labels: Candid, Artists Recording Collective
- Website: www.ericalindsay.com

Erica Lindsay (born June 5, 1955 in San Francisco, California, United States) is an American jazz saxophone player and composer.

== Music career ==
Lindsay's parents, both teachers, lived in Europe in the 1960s. She began her studies in composition with Mal Waldron in Munich when she was fifteen years old. She played clarinet, then alto and tenor saxophone. In 1973, she studied for a year at the Berklee School of Music in Boston and then went back to Europe, where she began her music career. She formed a local quartet and went on tour. Since 1980, she has lived in New York.

As a saxophonist, she worked with Melba Liston, Clifford Jordan, Dizzy Gillespie, McCoy Tyner, Reggie Workman, George Gruntz, and Pheeroan akLaff. Lindsay composed for theater, television, and dance productions and worked with poets and performance artists such as Carl Hancock Rux, Janice King, Janine Vega, Mikhail Horowitz and Nancy Ostrovsky. She led her own quartet and was the co-leader of a quartet with Sumi Tonooka.

In 1989, her debut album Dreamer was recorded for Candid Records, with contributions from Robin Eubanks, Howard Johnson, Francesca Tanksley, and Anthony Cox.

In the 1990s and 2000s, Lindsay played with Oliver Lake, Baikida Carroll, Howard Johnson, Jeff Siegel, Thurman Barker and the band Trace Elements. Their album Yes – Live at the Rosendale Cafe appeared in 2008.

She is co-founder of the Artists Recording Collective recording label.

Lindsay is a visiting Assistant Professor at Bard College.

== Discography ==
As leader or co-leader

- Dreamer (Candid, 1989)
- Yes: Live at the Rosendale Cafe (Artists Recording Collective, 2008)
- Initiation (Artists Recording Collective, 2009) with Sumi Tonooka

With Alchemy Sound Project

- Further Explorations (Alchemysoundproject, 2016)

With Baikida Carroll

- Door of the Cage (Soul Note, 1995)
- Marionettes on a High Wire (OmniTone, 2001)

With Oliver Lake

- Cloth (Passin' Thru, 2003)

With Jeff Siegel

- Live in Europe (Artists Recording Collective, 2005)
