= Walt Dickerson =

American jazz vibraphone player

Background information
- Born: Walter Roland Dickerson; April 16, 1928; Philadelphia, Pennsylvania, United States
- Died: May 15, 2008 (aged 80)
- Genres: Jazz
- Occupation: Musician
- Instrument: Vibraphone
- Labels: Prestige; SteepleChase
- Formerly of: Andrew Hill; Andrew Cyrille; Sun Ra

Walter Roland Dickerson (April 16, 1928 – May 15, 2008) was an American jazz vibraphone player, most associated with the post-bop idiom.

== Biography ==
Born in Philadelphia, Pennsylvania, United States, Walt Dickerson graduated from Morgan State University in 1953 and after two years in the Army he settled in California. There he started to gain attention by leading a group with Andrew Hill and Andrew Cyrille, but it was Dickerson's later period in New York City when he gained some further notice. For the Prestige label he recorded four albums. In 1962 Down Beat named him the best new artist.

From 1965 to 1975, he took a break from jazz, but later he worked again with Andrew Hill and Sun Ra. After 1975 Dickerson recorded several albums for the Danish Steeplechase label.

He died in May 2008 from a cardiac arrest.

== Discography ==
=== As leader/co-leader ===
Recording date	Album	Personnel	Label	Year released
1961–03	This Is Walt Dickerson!	Austin Crowe (piano), Bob Lewis (bass), Andrew Cyrille (drums)	New Jazz	1961
1961–05	A Sense of Direction	Austin Crowe (piano), Eustis Guillemet, Jr. (bass), Edgar Bateman (drums)	New Jazz	1961
1962–01	Relativity	Austin Crowe (piano), Ahmed Abdul-Malik (bass), Andrew Cyrille (drums)	New Jazz	1962
1962–09	To My Queen	Andrew Hill (piano), George Tucker (bass), Andrew Cyrille (drums)	New Jazz	1963
1963–03	Jazz Impressions of Lawrence of Arabia also released as Vibes in Motion	Austin Crowe (piano), Henry Grimes / Ahmed Abdul-Malik (bass), Andrew Cyrille (drums)	Dauntless	1963
1964–03	Walt Dickerson Plays Unity	Walter Davis, Jr. (piano), George Tucker (bass), Edgar Bateman, Andrew Cyrille (drums)	Audio Fidelity	1964
1965	Impressions of a Patch of Blue	Sun Ra (piano, harpsichord, celeste), Bob Cunningham (bass), Roger Blank (drums)	MGM	1966
1975–07	Tell Us Only the Beautiful Things	Wilbur Ware (bass), Andrew Cyrille (drums)	Whynot	1975
1975–11	Peace	Lisle Atkinson (bass), Andrew Cyrille (drums)	SteepleChase	1976
1976	Walt Dickerson 1976	Wilbur Ware (bass), Jamaaladeen Tacuma (electric bass), Edgar Bateman (drums)	Whynot	1976
1976–08	Serendipity	Jamaaladeen Tacuma (electric bass), Edgar Bateman (drums)	SteepleChase	1977
1977–02	Divine Gemini	Co-led duo with Richard Davis (bass)	SteepleChase	1978
1977–02	Tenderness	Co-led duo with Richard Davis (bass)	SteepleChase	1985
1977–11	Shades of Love	Solo	SteepleChase	1978
1978–07	To My Queen Revisited	Albert Dailey (piano), Andy McKee (bass), Jimmy Johnson (drums)	SteepleChase	1979
1978–07	Visions	Co-led duo with Sun Ra (piano)	SteepleChase	1978
1978–09	Landscape with Open Door	Co-led duo with Pierre Dørge (g, per)	SteepleChase	1979
1978–10	I Hear You John	Andy McKee (bass), Jimmy Johnson (drums)	SteepleChase	1980
1978–11	To My Son	Andy McKee (bass), Jimmy Johnson (drums)	SteepleChase	1980
1982–02	Life Rays	Sirone (bass), Andrew Cyrille (drums)	Soul Note	1982

=== As arranger ===
- Elmo Hope, Sounds from Rikers Island (Audio Fidelity, 1963)
