= Marionettes on a High Wire =

Studio album by Baikida Carroll
- Released: 2001
- Recorded: September 14–15, 2000
- Studio: Systems 2, Brooklyn, New York
- Genre: Free jazz
- Length: 1:02:11
- Label: OmniTone; 12101
- Producer: Baikida Carroll, Frank Tafuri

Baikida Carroll chronology
Door of the Cage (1995)	Marionettes on a High Wire (2001)

Marionettes on a High Wire is an album by trumpeter and composer Baikida Carroll. It was recorded on September 14 and 15, 2000, at Systems 2 in Brooklyn, New York, and was released in 2001 by OmniTone, Inc. On the album, which features original compositions, some of which were drawn from theater works, Carroll is joined by saxophonist Erica Lindsay, pianist Adegoke Steve Colson, double bassist Michael Formanek, and drummer Pheeroan akLaff.

== Reception ==
Professional ratings
Review scores
Source	Rating
AllMusic	4/5 stars
The Penguin Guide to Jazz Recordings	3/4 stars

In a review for AllMusic, David R. Adler wrote: "There's a beautiful kind of daring in the music -- a rough tenderness in Carroll's trumpet tone, a palpable spiritual commitment from all the players involved... Carroll and his group unleash a highly adventurous sound while remaining within certain jazz parameters: planned solo rotation, distinct harmony and form, straight swing tempo."

The authors of The Penguin Guide to Jazz Recordings stated: "It's hard to locate Carroll on the continuum from traditional blues-based jazz to the free idiom, because he constantly balances elements of the two... Colson is excellent in accompaniment, and akLaff as ever provides powerful rhythmic support."

Glenn Astarita of All About Jazz noted that, on the album, Carroll "demonstrates acute technical skills along with his stature as a gifted composer who here, reaps the benefits of a power house ensemble." He commented: "Carroll's latest release equates to one beautifully fabricated production, that imparts a lasting impression... Recommended!!"

JazzWord's Ken Waxman remarked: "this fine CD shows that despite setbacks, Carroll has lost neither his chops nor his inventiveness. A strong freebop quintet session, it could be seen as extending the modal conception Miles Davis abandoned when he turned to electronic fusion in the early 1970s."

Writing for Bells, Henry Kuntz stated that the album features "music that's fresh, intelligent and dynamic, tight yet open," and wrote: "It swings, sings, probes, and has more of the engaging group interplay Baikida Carroll the musician and composer inspires."

== Track listing ==
Composed by Baikida Carroll.

1. "Ebullient Secrets" – 5:00
2. "Griot's Last Dance" – 7:29 (dedicated to Don Cherry)
3. "Marionettes on a High Wire" – 8:08
4. "Miss Julie" – 9:06 (from the play "Miss Julie" by August Strindberg)
5. "Our Say" – 5:32 (from the Broadway play "Having Our Say" by Emily Mann)
6. "A Thrill a Minute" – 6:36
7. "Velma" – 7:21 (dedicated to Velma Porter)
8. "Flamboye" – 5:44 (dedicated to Julius Hemphill)
9. "Down Under" – 5:04
10. "Cab" – 1:54 (from "Having Our Say")

== Personnel ==
- Baikida Carroll – trumpet
- Erica Lindsay – tenor saxophone
- Adegoke Steve Colson – piano
- Michael Formanek – double bass
- Pheeroan akLaff – drums
