= Kevin Davy =

British musician

Kevin G. Davy (born 29 October 1961, Nottingham, UK) is a British jazz trumpeter/flugelhorn player, composer, arranger and bandleader. He has recorded with and toured with Finley Quaye, Lamb, Adam F and Lemn Sissay's Secret Society. He has led the Kevin Davy Quartet (KDQ), D’Semble, and Kevin Davy's Monster Jam . In 1992 Davy was given the Manchester Jazz Musician of the Year Award by BBC Radio Manchester show The People.

Relocating to Manchester in 1986, Davy studied at the Manchester Metropolitan University, attaining a Bachelor of Arts Degree (B.A) in General Arts (Humanities) in 1990. While enrolled there he attended the weekly jazz improvisation workshops organized by Colin Stansfield in the nearby All Saints College, subsumed into the campus of Manchester Metropolitan University.

== Career ==
Davy remained in Manchester until 1994, playing at venues such as Band on the Wall and PJ Bells, where he was booked for residencies. He also led open jam sessions for musicians and vocalists of varying skills to participate. These sessions ran for nine years.

In 1994, after being recommended by the late Colin Goddard, former studio owner of Moonrakers Studio, Manchester, Davy relocated to London, where he took up the post of trumpet chair and actor/musician at the Donmar Warehouse on their production of the Brecht/Weil, work;The Threepenny Opera directed by Phyllida Lloyd, and under the musical direction of Gary Yershon, and Kate Edgar. Collaborations with writer SuAndi followed, leading to Davy's participation in community-driven projects and a long-standing international tour with the show Afrika Afrika (Oct 2008 – March 2009), conceived by André Heller and choreographed by Georges Mamboye. Produced by Matthias Hoffman.

Davy has continued to develop his own writing and producing, via his group the Kevin Davy Quartet (KDQ). This unison resulted in the album The Thoth Project, which has been performed at several venues in the UK, including in the Attic at the Hackney Picturehouse.

Davy has collaborated with jazz musicians from several countries, including Sangoma Everett (the US, now based in France), Pibo Marquez(Venezuela), Paul Shigihara (Japanese-German), Doudou Gouirand (France), Roman Rahut (Poland), Krzesimir Debski (Poland), and Claude Deppa (South Africa). He has also worked with Crass Agenda.

Following work on his album, The Thoth Project, Davy resumed freelancing on trumpet in London with a number of artists, including Finley Quaye, Lamb, and more recently, Cymande.

He has also periodically held revivals of "Kevin Davy's Monster Jam", at various London venues, combining musicians and vocalists from around the U.K. Most recently he has hosted jam sessions at the Rich Mix venue in Bethnal Green, and at the Cat's Back in Wandsworth. During one of the original Monster Jams held at Band On The Wall, in Manchester between 1995–96, he met Andy Barlow and Lou Rhodes of Lamb, leading to touring and recording sessions; playing on Lamb's first two albums. Davy began playing in the emerging drum and bass and trip hop genres. He remains an occasional guest performer with Lamb, and featured on their recent album: "The Secret of Letting Go". Kevin also worked with producers, Adam F, Sugizo, and Hideaki Takahashi a.k.a. MJUC. He has more recently performed in the UAE, India and Sri Lanka, in tribute to the Trumpet legend; Miles Davis, on jazz festivals, also headlining at London's Jazz Cafe, in a tribute to the great Dizzy Gillespie. Davy is also in demand for recordings and studio work as well as live performances.

Kevin G Davy, has been a presenter on Jazz London Radio for the last three years, with his weekly podcast entitled; Kevin Davy's D'semble, which is a reprise of the moniker he used for his group formed in Manchester in 1990.

== Discography ==
- Savage Utopia - Crass Agenda (Babel Label, 2004)
- Grand Cross - Sugizo (Polydor, 1999) (Japan only)
