= Andy McKee (bassist) =

American jazz musician (born 1953)

Andrew G. McKee (born November 11, 1953) is a New York-based, American bassist who has been performing and recording in North America, South America, Europe, and Japan since 1978. McKee's most important rhythm section mentors have included Philly Joe Jones, Elvin Jones and Idris Muhammad. He travelled widely in Europe with both Elvin Jones and with French pianist Michel Petrucciani. He played for about a decade with the Mingus Big Band and has had his own groups. He is the author of two books on upright bass technique and has taught at The New School for Jazz and Contemporary Music since 1993.

== Life and career ==
Born in Philadelphia, McKee first studied piano and alto saxophone before turning to the double bass at age 14. Among his teachers were Homer Mensch, Richard Davis and Al Stauffer. McKee's first significant jazz mentor was drummer Philly Joe Jones. McKee joined the Philly Joe Jones Quartet, performing and touring the US and Canada in 1979-80.

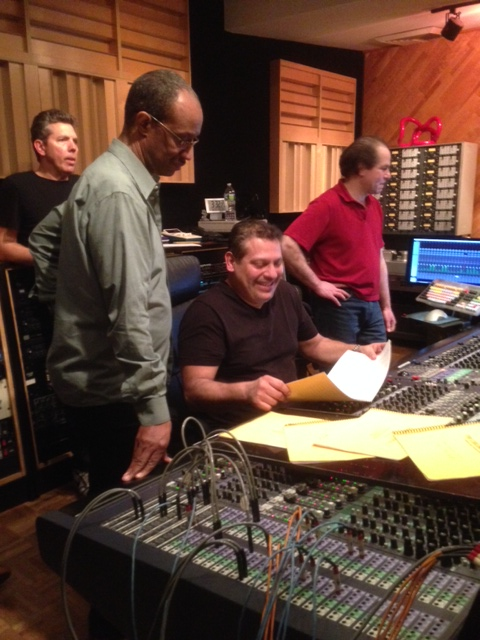
Andy McKee (background left) with Douglas Purviance, Luis Bonilla and Michael Marchione during recordings for Mists: Charles Ives for Jazz Orchestra, April 2014

McKee's first European tour was of Denmark, Norway, Sweden and Germany with the Walt Dickerson Trio in the late 1970s; he is heard on two live recordings released after the tour by Steeplechase in 1978 and 1980. In 1980, McKee moved to New York City, and his long partnership with master drummer Elvin Jones began. McKee's first major engagement with the Elvin Jones Jazz Machine was in April 1983 at the Village Vanguard. He went on to be the staff bassist with the Jazz Machine, touring Europe and the US from 1986-91.

In 1984, McKee moved to Paris, and began to perform and tour with Chet Baker, Mal Waldron and Steve Grossman among others. In the years between 1986 and 1991, Andy toured the United States, Canada, Europe, and Japan as the regular bassist in the Michel Petrucciani Group with drummer Victor Jones. He joined Hank Jones, Slide Hampton, Satolu Oda and Lewis Nash on two recordings made during a tour of Japan in 1994.

Back in New York starting in 1991, McKee was for ten years the bassist and part-time musical director of the Mingus Big Band, playing weekly engagements at NYC's Time Café, touring worldwide and playing on numerous recordings. Working with Dave Stryker, Steve Slagle and Manolo Badrena, he helped form the band Trio Mundo, which released two albums. McKee has also formed his own groups, leading colleagues in recording One World (1997) and Sound Roots (2002).

McKee has appeared on the recent releases of trombonist Luis Bonilla. He has recorded with composer and pianist Peter Madsen and taken part in several big band ventures including an arrangement of Charles Ives' music by Jack Cooper.

McKee has been a faculty member at The New School for Jazz and Contemporary Music in New York City teaching bass, improvisation and Mingus repertory since 1993. McKee has two books published by Hal Leonard Corporation, Jazz Bass on Top (2011) and 101 Upright Bass Tips (2014).

McKee lives in Montclair, New Jersey.

== Discography ==
As leader

- One World 2002 (Cap Records 965) Andy McKee with Idris Muhammad, Joe Locke, Alex Foster, Badal Roy, Milton Cadonna, Kenny Werner.
- Sound Roots 1997 (Mapleshade 04432) Andy McKee & NEXT with Ed Cherry, Alex Foster, Ryan Kisor, Billy Kilson.

Collaborations

- Autumn in New York 2013 (AJM 24) René Boutlang and Andy McKee with Oliver Lake, Vic Juris, Billy Hart.
- Trio Mundo Rides Again 2004 (ZM 200410) with Dave Stryker, Steve Slagel, Manolo Badrena.
- Trio Mundo Carnaval 2002 (KWM 200204) with Dave Stryker, Steve Slagel, Manolo Badrena.
- Earthbound Unity 1993 (LR 189) with Alexandros, Alex Foster, Victor Jones, Steve Thornton.

As a sideman

- Mists: Charles Ives for Jazz Orchestra 2014 (Planet Arts 101420) Arranged by Jack Cooper.
- The Litchfield Suite: Peter Madsen Trio 2010 (PSR 080308) with Peter Madsen, Gerald Cleaver.
- Twilight 2010 (NJM 300977) with Luis Bonilla, Bruce Barth, Ivan Renta, John Riley.
- I Talking Now! 2009 (NJM 300977) with Luis Bonilla, Arturo O'Farrill, Ivan Renta, John Riley.
- High Noon: The Jazz Soul of Frankie Laine 2008 (RSR 195) with Gary Smulyan, Dick Oatts, Pete Malinverni, John Clark and others.
- Strike Up the Band 2008 (SCCD 31637) with Dave Stryker, Xavier Davis, Billy Hart.
- Space Messengers: Wolfgang Schalk Quartet 2005 (EMARCY 987189-4) with Wolfgang Schalk, Dave Kikoski, Ian Froman.
- Rainbows in the Night: Wolfgang Schalk Quartet 2002 (WEM 911501-2) with Wolfgang Schalk, Dave Kikoski, Ian Froman.
- Tonight at Noon 2001 (DRYCD 36633) Mingus Big Band.
- Blues and Politics 1999 (FDM 36603-2) Mingus Big Band.
- Steve Grossman Quartet with Michel Petrucciani 1999 (FDM 36602-2) with Steve Grossman, Michel Petrucciani, Joe Farnsworth.
- Que Viva Mingus 1997 (FDM36593-2) Mingus Big Band.
- Mingus Big Band Live In Time 1996 (FDM 36603-2) Mingus Big Band.
- Tarantula 1996 (ENJ 93022) with Daniel Schnyder and other artists.
- Gun-slinging Birds 1995 (FDM 36575-2) Mingus Big Band.
- Nostalgia in Times Square 1993 (FDM 36559-2) Mingus Big Band.
- Three Saxophone Band Plays Mulligan 1997 (FDM 36588-2) with Ronnie Cuber, Nick Brignola, Garry Smulyan, Joe Farnsworth.
- Keep In Touch: Jack Wilkins-Kenny Drew Quartet 1996 (Claves Jazz 50-1295) with Jack Wilkins, Kenny Drew, Jr. Akira Tana.
- Satolism: The Great Jazz Quintet 1995 (TKCV 79096) with Hank Jones, Satolu Oda, Slide Hampton, Lewis Nash.
- In a New York Minute: Ronnie Cuber Quartet 1995 (SCCD 31372) with Ronnie Cuber, Kenny Drew, Jr., Adam Cruz.
- Minority Anyone: The Great Jazz Quintet 1995 (SRCL 3199) with Hank Jones, Satolu Oda, Slide Hampton, Lewis Nash.
- A Second Look 1994 (Groovin High 523 799-2) with Ed Cherry, Kenny Barron, John Patton.
- Music 1986 (BI 92563) with Michel Petrucciani, Victor Jones and others.
- That's Nice: The Barry Altschul Quartet/Quintet 1986 (SN 1151) with Barry Altschul, Glenn Ferris, Sean Bergin, Mike Mellilo.
- Forgotten Tales: Doudou Gouirand featuring Don Cherry 1985 (VS 106) with Doudou Gouirand, Don Cherry, Cheikh Fall and others.
- What it is to be Frank: Bill Kirshner Nonet 1982 (SB 2010) with Bill Kirshner, Doug Purviance, Ralph Lalama and others.

With Walt Dickerson

- To My Queen Revisited (SteepleChase, 1978)
- I Hear You John (SteepleChase, 1978)
- To My Son (SteepleChase, 1980)
