= Live (Sirone album) =

Live album by Sirone
- Released: 2005
- Recorded: November 7, 1980
- Studio: The Public Theater, New York City
- Genre: Free jazz
- Length: 42:16
- Label: Atavistic Records; ALP 253
- Producer: Sirone, Kazunori Sugiyama

Sirone chronology
Sirone's Concord (2003)	Live (2005)	Configuration (2005)

Live is a live album by bassist Sirone, recorded in November, 1980, at The Public Theater in New York City. It was initially released in 1981 on Sirone's label Serious Music, and was reissued in 2005 by Atavistic Records as part of their Unheard Music Series. On the album, Sirone is joined by saxophonist Claude Lawrence and drummer Dennis Charles.

== Reception ==
Professional ratings
Review scores
Source	Rating
AllMusic	5/5 stars
The Penguin Guide to Jazz	3/4 stars

The editors of AllMusic awarded the album 5 stars. Reviewer Michael G. Nastos called it "potent, creative music."

The authors of the Penguin Guide to Jazz Recordings wrote: "Sirone's deep, bluesy tone and background in horn-playing are evident... Charles and Lawrence are largely present to set up ideas and improvising contexts... it's his bass playing that is most revelatory, rich and resonant sounds and some nimbly inventive ideas."

Writing for All About Jazz, John Eyles commented: "Live is both a valuable historical snapshot and a curate's egg of an album, very good in parts." Regarding "Eyes of the Wind," he stated: "Sirone has been quoted as saying, 'The music has been abused by that word 'free.' Sometimes you get a lot of noise.' This track is a powerful antidote to that tendency: noisy or anarchic it isn't... Free it may be, but it does not sacrifice musicality or logic as a result." He concluded: "Overall, this album makes a very welcome return to Sirone's catalogue."

== Track listing ==
1. "Flute Song" (Sirone) – 10:00
2. "Eyes of the Wind" (Lawrence/Charles) – 11:00
3. "The Journey" (Sirone) – 6:00
4. "When It's Over" (Lawrence/Sirone) – 7:40
5. "Vision" (Sirone) – 8:30

== Personnel ==
- Claude Lawrence – alto saxophone
- Sirone – bass, wood flute, trombone
- Dennis Charles – drums
