= Persia My Dear =

Studio album by Richard Davis, Sir Roland Hanna and Frederick Waits
- Released: 1987
- Recorded: August 1, 1987
- Studio: CBS Studio, Tokyo, Japan
- Genre: Jazz
- Length: 50:45
- Label: DIW; DIW-8015
- Producer: Eiji Nakayama

Richard Davis chronology
Tenderness (1978)	Persia My Dear (1987)	Live at Sweet Basil (1990)

Persia My Dear is an album by bassist Richard Davis, pianist Sir Roland Hanna and drummer Frederick Waits recorded in Japan in 1987 and released on the Japanese DIW label.

== Reception ==
Professional ratings
Review scores
Source	Rating
Allmusic	3.5/5 stars
The Penguin Guide to Jazz Recordings	3/4 stars

AllMusic reviewer Thom Jurek described Persia My Dear as "a sweet little session that features Davis in light of his brilliant arco skills as well as his deep, intricate melodic interplay".

== Track listing ==
1. "Manhattan Safari" (Roland Hanna) - 7:49
2. "Southpark and Richard" (Hanna) - 6:02
3. "Summer in Central Park" (Horace Silver) - 5:06
4. "Brownie Speaks" (Clifford Brown) - 6:25
5. "Persia My Dear" (Richard Davis) - 5:25
6. "Strange Vibes" (Silver) - 11:04
7. "Let Me Try" (Hanna) - 8:54

== Personnel ==
- Richard Davis - bass
- Sir Roland Hanna - piano
- Frederick Wait - drums
