= Roland Hanna =

American jazz musician (1932–2002)

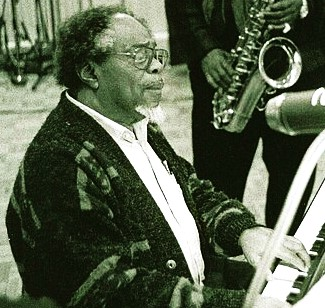
- Hanna in 2001

Background information
- Born: Roland Pembroke Hanna; February 10, 1932; Detroit, Michigan, U.S.
- Died: November 13, 2002 (aged 70) Hackensack, New Jersey, U.S.
- Genres: Jazz, avant-garde, jazz fusion
- Occupations: Musician, composer, bandleader
- Instruments: Piano, electric piano, cello

Roland Pembroke Hanna (February 10, 1932 – November 13, 2002) was an American jazz pianist, composer, and teacher. He was sometimes billed as Sir Roland Hanna after receiving an honorary knighthood in 1970, and he also founded the New York Jazz Quartet.

== Biography ==
Hanna studied classical piano from the age of 11, but was strongly interested in jazz, having been introduced to it by his friend, pianist Tommy Flanagan. This interest increased after his time in military service (1950–1952). He studied briefly at the Eastman School of Music in 1953 and then enrolled at the Juilliard School when he moved to New York City two years later. He worked with several big names in the 1950s, including Benny Goodman and Charles Mingus, and graduated in 1960. Between 1963 and 1966, Hanna led his own trio, then from 1966 to 1974 he was a regular member of The Thad Jones/Mel Lewis Orchestra. Hanna also toured the Soviet Union with the orchestra in 1972. During the 1970s, he was a member of the New York Jazz Quartet.

Roland Hanna was in semi-retirement for most of the 1980s, though he played piano and wrote the song "Seasons" for Sarah Vaughan's 1982 album Crazy and Mixed Up, and returned to music later in the decade. In the late 1980s and early 1990s, Hanna was a member of the Lincoln Center Jazz Orchestra and the Smithsonian Jazz Masterworks Orchestra. Around this time, he also began composing chamber and orchestral music; a ballet he wrote has also been performed.

In 1970, Hanna was given an honorary knighthood by President William Tubman of Liberia in recognition of concerts he played in the country to raise money for education. Thereafter, Hanna was often known as "Sir Roland Hanna." Hanna was a professor of jazz at the Aaron Copland School of Music at Queens College in Flushing, New York, and taught at several other music schools. He was a resident of Teaneck, New Jersey.

He died in Hackensack, New Jersey, of a viral infection of the heart, on November 13, 2002.

Critic and jazz pianist Len Lyons grouped Hanna with fellow Detroit pianists Hank Jones, Barry Harris, and Flanagan for their "tasteful accompaniment and the sophisticated use of modern jazz elements in their soloing and trio work." Jazz pianist Dick Katz observed, "Because of Roland's extensive [classical] training ... he developed a bravura technique that led him into areas where many jazz pianists don't go. He learned how to integrate his classical background into much of what he composed and played. ... Roland had the rare gift of being able to truly improvise from scratch, letting his imagination take him almost anywhere on a given theme. He was not dependent on any specific style to tell his stories. Like Earl Hines and few others, he never played a piece the same way twice."

== Discography ==
=== As leader/co-leader ===
Year recorded	Title	Label	Year released	Personnel/Notes
1959	Destry Rides Again	ATCO	1959	Trio/quartet, with George Duvivier, Roy Burns, Kenny Burrell
1959	Easy to Love	ATCO	1960	Trio, with Ben Tucker, Roy Burns
1971	Child of Gemini	MPS	1971	Trio, with Dave Holland, Daniel Humair
1973	The New Heritage Keyboard Quartet	Blue Note	1973	As The New Heritage Keyboard Quartet, with Mickey Tucker, Richard Davis, Eddie Gladden
1973	Sir Elf:	Choice	1973	Solo piano
1974	Let It Happen	RCA	1974	As The Jazz Piano Quartet, with Dick Hyman, Hank Jones, Marian McPartland
1973–1974	Walkin'	Jazz Hour	1990	Some tracks trio, with George Mraz, Mel Lewis; some tracks quartet, with Stéphane Grappelli added
1974	Perugia	Freedom	1975	Solo piano; in concert
1974	Informal Solo	Hi-Fly	1974	Solo piano. Reissued as Solo Piano (Storyville, 2005)
1974	1 X 1	Toho (Japan)	1974	Duo, with George Mraz
1975	Roland Hanna Trio	Salvation (Japan)	1975	Trio, with Ron Carter, Ben Riley
1976	Porgy & Bess	Trio (Japan)	1976	Duo, with George Mraz
1976	24 Preludes Book 1	Salvation (Japan)	1976	Some tracks solo piano; some tracks duo, with George Mraz
1977	At Home With Friends	Progressive	1977	Trio, with George Mraz, Richard Pratt; also released as Time for the Dancers (1980)
1977	Sir Elf Plus 1	Choice	1978	Some tracks solo piano; some tracks duo, with George Mraz
1977	Glove	Trio (Japan)	1977	Trio, with George Mraz, Motohiko Hino
1977	24 Preludes Book 2	Salvation (Japan)	1978	Some tracks solo piano; some tracks duo, with George Mraz
1978	Roland Hanna Plays the Music of Alec Wilder	Trio (Japan)	1978	Solo piano
1978	This Must Be Love	Progressive	1978	Trio, with George Mraz, Ben Riley
1978	Rolandscape	Progressive	1978	Trio, with George Mraz, Ben Riley
1978	Bird Watching	Progressive	1978	Solo piano
1978	Roland Hanna and George Mraz Play for Monk	Musical Heritage Society	1978	Duo, with George Mraz
1978	A Gift from the Magi	West 54	1979	Solo piano
1979	Swing Me No Waltzes	Storyville	1980	Solo piano. Additional tracks from 1973 included in 2000 reissue.
1979	Trinity	L+R	1979	Trio, with Hans Koller, Attila Zoller
1979	Piano Soliloquy	L+R	1980	Solo piano
1979	Impressions	Black & Blue	1979	Trio, with Major Holley, Alan Dawson. also released as Lover Come Back to Me (Norma, 1979).
1979	Och Jungfrun Gick Åt Killan...	Sonet	1979	Solo piano
1979	Sunrise, Sunset	Lob (Japan)	1979	Duo, with George Mraz. Reissued as When You Wish Upon a Star (AMJ, 2002)
1982	Romanesque	Trio (Japan)	1982	Duo, with George Mraz
1982	Gershwin Carmichael Cats	CTI	1982	Duo/trio/quartet/quintet/sextet/dectet
1987?	Manhattan Christmas	Fun House	1987	Solo piano
1987	Round Midnight	Town Crier Recordings	1987	Solo piano
1987	This Time It's Real - Live At Slukefter-Tivoli Gardens	Storyville	1988	Quartet, with Jesper Thilo, Mads Winding, Aage Tanggaard; in concert
1987	Persia My Dear	DIW	1987	Trio, with Richard Davis, Freddie Waits
1987?	The Bar	Fun House	1988	Trio, with Clint Houston, Lewis Nash
1990	Duke Ellington Piano Solos	MusicMasters	1991	Solo piano
1990	Memoir	Century (Japan)	1990	Duo, with Eiji Nakayama
1993	Sir Roland Hanna Quartet Plays Gershwin	LRC/Laserlight	1993	Quartet, with Bill Easley, Jon Burr, Ronnie Burrage
1993	Maybeck Recital Hall Series, Volume Thirty-Two	Concord	1994	Solo piano; in concert
1994?	Jazz Sonatas	Angel	1994	Some tracks duo, with Dick Hyman; some tracks quartet, with chamber trio
1995	Ancestral Light	Red Earth Jazz	1999	Duo, with George Mraz
1996	3 for All	Cei Cymekob	1996	Trio, with Bucky Pizzarelli, Jon Burr
1996	Hush A Bye	What'sNew (Japan)	1997	Trio, with Eiji Nakayama, Seiji Komatsu
1997	The Three Black Kings	Jazz Friends Productions	1997	Trio, with Richard Davis, Andrew Cyrille
1997	I Love Be-Bop	Rahanna Music	1998	Trio, with Yoshio Aomori, Cris Roselli. Self-released.
1998?	Family & Friends	Prestige Elite	1998	With Michael Hanna
1998	Royal Essence: An Evening of Ellington	Jazzmont	1999	Duo, with Davey Yarborough; in concert
2001	Dream	Venus	2001	Trio, with Paul West, Eddie Locke (drums)
2002	Milano, Paris, New York: Finding John Lewis	Venus	2002	Trio, with George Mraz, Lewis Nash
2002	Everything I Love	IPO	2002	Solo piano
2002	I've Got a Right to Sing the Blues	IPO	2002	Duo, with Carrie Smith
2002	Tributaries: Reflections on Tommy Flanagan	IPO	2003	Solo piano
2002	Après Un Rêve	Venus	2003	Trio, with Ron Carter, Grady Tate
2002	Last Concert	What's New (Japan)	2003	Some tracks duo, with Eiji Nakayama and Mihoko Hazama (separately); some tracks trio, with Nakayama and Hazama; in concert

Posthumous compilations

- Memoir One For Eiji with Eiji Nakayama (What's New, 2004)
- Colors from a Giant's Kit (IPO, 2011)

=== As member of a group ===
The Thad Jones/Mel Lewis Orchestra

- Presenting Joe Williams and Thad Jones/Mel Lewis, the Jazz Orchestra (Solid State, 1966)
- Live at the Village Vanguard (Solid State, 1967)
- Jazz Casual – Thad Jones/Mel Lewis Orchestra and Woody Herman and His Swinging Herd (1968)
- The Big Band Sound of Thad Jones/Mel Lewis featuring Miss Ruth Brown (Solid State, 1968)
- Monday Night (Solid State, 1968)
- Central Park North (Solid State, 1969)
- Basle, 1969 (TCB Music, 1969, released 1996)
- Consummation (Solid State/Blue Note, 1969)
- Live in Tokyo (Denon Jazz, 1974)
- Potpourri (Philadelphia International, 1974)
- Thad Jones/Mel Lewis and Manuel De Sica (PAUSA, 1974)
- Suite for Pops (A&M Horizon, 1975)
- New Life (A&M Horizon, 1976)

The New York Jazz Quartet

- In Concert in Japan with Ron Carter, Ben Riley, Frank Wess (Salvation, 1975) – live
- Surge with George Mraz, Richard Pratt, Frank Wess, (Enja, 1977)
- Song of the Black Knight with George Mraz, Richard Pratt, Frank Wess (Sonet, 1978)
- Blues for Sarka with George Mraz, Grady Tate, Frank Wess (Enja, 1978) – live
- Oasis with George Mraz, Ben Riley, Frank Wess (Enja, 1981)
- The New York Jazz Quartet in Chicago with George Mraz, Ben Riley, Frank Wess (Bee Hive, 1981)

Mingus Dynasty

- Live At Montreux (Atlantic, 1981) – live
- Reincarnation (Soul Note, 1982)
- Mingus' Sounds Of Love (Soul Note, 1988)
- Live At The Village Vanguard (Storyville, 1989) – live
- Epitaph (Charles Mingus composition) (Columbia, 1990) – live recorded in 1989

=== As sideman ===
With Pepper Adams

- Ephemera (Spotlite, 1974) – recorded in 1973
- Reflectory (Muse, 1978)

With Kenny Burrell

- Swingin' (Blue Note, 1980) – recorded in 1956
- On View at the Five Spot Cafe (Blue Note, 1959) – live
- Asphalt Canyon Suite (Verve, 1969)
- Ellington Is Forever Volume Two (Fantasy, 1977) – recorded in 1975

With Ron Carter

- All Blues (CTI, 1973)
- Spanish Blue (CTI, 1974)
- Stardust (Somethin' Else, 2001)

With Richard Davis

- Muses for Richard Davis (MPS, 1969)
- Persia My Dear (DIW, 1987)

With Elvin Jones

- Dear John C. (Impulse!, 1965)
- Very R.A.R.E. (Trio (Japan), 1979)

With Jimmy Knepper

- Cunningbird (SteepleChase, 1977)
- I Dream Too Much (Soul Note, 1984)

With Red Rodney

- The Red Tornado (Muse, 1975)
- Red, White and Blues (Muse, 1978)
- The 3R's (Muse, 1982) – recorded in 1979

With Sonny Stitt

- Mr. Bojangles (Cadet, 1973)
- Satan (Cadet, 1974)

With others

- Gene Ammons, My Way (Prestige, 1971)
- George Benson, Good King Bad (CTI, 1975)
- Dee Dee Bridgewater, Afro Blue (Trio, 1974)
- Ruth Brown, Ruth Brown '65 (Mainstream, 1965)
- Benny Carter, In the Mood for Swing (MusicMasters, 1988)
- Eddie "Lockjaw" Davis, Love Calls (RCA Victor, 1968)
- Eddie Daniels, First Prize! (Prestige, 1967)
- Mercer Ellington, Digital Duke (GRP, 1987)
- Jon Faddis and Billy Harper, Jon & Billy (Trio, 1974)
- Stéphane Grappelli, Meets the Rhythm Section (Black Lion, 1973; reissued with bonus tracks as Parisian Thoroughfare)
- Jim Hall, Concierto (CTI, 1975)
- John Handy, In the Vernacular (Roulette, 1958)
- Jimmy Heath, Little Man Big Band (Verve, 1992)
- Al Hibbler, Early One Morning (LMI, 1964)
- Freddie Hubbard, The Hub of Hubbard (MPS, 1970)
- Miriam Klein, By Myself (L+R, 1979)
- Hubert Laws, Laws' Cause (Atlantic, 1968)
- Lincoln Center Jazz Orchestra, Lincoln Center Jazz Orchestra – Jazz At Lincoln Center: They Came To Swing (Sony, 1992)
- Herbie Mann, Glory of Love (A&M, 1967)
- Les McCann, Comment (Atlantic, 1970)
- Charles Mingus, Mingus Dynasty (Columbia, 1959)
- Frank Morgan, You Must Believe in Spring (Antilles, 1992, Hanna plays on 2 tracks)
- Idris Muhammad, House of the Rising Sun (Kudu, 1976)
- Ray Nance, Body and Soul (Solid State, 1969)
- Kwame Nkrumah, The Ninth Son (Columbia, 1969)
- Maurice Peress, Four Symphonic Works by Duke Ellington (MusicMasters, 1989)
- Seldon Powell, Seldon Powell Sextet Featuring Jimmy Cleveland (Roost, 1956)
- Don Sebesky, The Rape of El Morro (CTI, 1975)
- Carol Sloane, Sophisticated Lady (Audiophile, 1977)
- Louis Smith (musician), Prancin (Steeple Chase, 1979)
- Stanley Turrentine, If I Could (MusicMasters, 1993)
- Sarah Vaughan, Crazy and Mixed Up (Pablo, 1982)
- Phil Woods, Round Trip (Verve, 1969)
