= Jazz Impressions of Lawrence of Arabia =

Studio album by Walt Dickerson
- Released: 1963
- Recorded: March 21 & 25, 1963
- Studio: Gotham Studios, New York City
- Genre: Jazz
- Label: Dauntless; DS 6313
- Producer: Herman D. Gimbel

Walt Dickerson chronology
To My Queen (1962)	Jazz Impressions of Lawrence of Arabia (1963)	Walt Dickerson Plays Unity (1964)

Vibes in Motion Cover

Jazz Impressions of Lawrence of Arabia is an album led by vibraphonist and composer Walt Dickerson featuring music from the film Lawrence of Arabia (1962) which was recorded in 1963 and first released on the Dauntless label. It was later released on the Audio Fidelity label under the title, Vibes in Motion.

== Reception ==
Professional ratings
Review scores
Source	Rating
Allmusic	4.5/5 stars
Down Beat	3.5/5 stars

The Allmusic site awarded the album 4 1/2 stars, stating: "This effort from the vibraphonist stretches the parameters of Maurice Jarre's themes". DownBeat reviewer Harvey Pekar wrote: "Many jazz versions of movie soundtracks are weighed down with uninteresting material, but this album is better than most others partly because it has passable thematic material. Dickerson's arranging is eclectic."

== Track listing ==
No.	Title	Length
1.	"Theme from Lawrence of Arabia"	2:46
2.	"That Is the Desert"	5:08
3.	"Motif from Overture Part I"	3:55
4.	"Motif from Overture Part II"	3:47
5.	"Arrival at Auda's Camp"	2:21
6.	"Nefud Mirage Part I"	4:36
7.	"Nefud Mirage Part II"	4:20
8.	"The Voice of the Guns"	3:27
Total length:		30:06

== Personnel ==
- Walt Dickerson – vibraphone
- Austin Crowe – piano
- Ahmed Abdul-Malik (tracks 1 & 2), Henry Grimes (tracks 3–8) – bass
- Andrew Cyrille – drums
