= Destry Rides Again (Roland Hanna album) =

Studio album by Roland Hanna
- Released: 1959
- Recorded: April 16 & 17, 1959
- Studio: New York City, NY
- Genre: Jazz
- Length: 35:24
- Label: ATCO; SD 33-108
- Producer: Nesuhi Ertegun

Roland Hanna chronology
Destry Rides Again (1959)	Easy to Love (1960)

Destry Rides Again (full title Roland Hanna Plays Harold Rome's Destry Rides Again) is the debut album by pianist Roland Hanna performing selections from Harold Rome's stage musical Destry Rides Again, recorded in 1959 and released that year by the ATCO label.

== Reception ==
Professional ratings
Review scores
Source	Rating
AllMusic	3.5/5 stars
The Penguin Guide to Jazz Recordings	3/4 stars

AllMusic reviewer Ken Dryden stated: "This session was actually his first as a leader, though opportunities to record on a regular basis on his own were infrequent until the '70s. The pianist, who is joined by bassist George Duvivier and drummer Roy Burness, with guitarist Kenny Burrell added on four tracks, does his best with lively interpretations of each song, but the compositions never really caught on to become standards and they just aren't all that remarkable decades after their premiere, even if none of them are really bad or bland."

== Track listing ==
All compositions by Harold Rome

1. "I Know Your Kind" – 5:01
2. "Fair Warning" – 4:38
3. "Rose Lovejoy of Paradise Valley" – 4:06
4. "That Ring on the Finger" – 3:44
5. "Once Knew a Fella" – 4:42
6. "Anyone Would Love You" – 3:43
7. "I Say Hello" – 4:01
8. "Hoop De Dingle" – 5:31

== Personnel ==
- Roland Hanna – piano
- George Duvivier – bass
- Roy Burns – drums
- Kenny Burrell – guitar (tracks 2, 3, 7 & 8)
