= To My Son =

Studio album by Walt Dickerson Trio
- Released: 1980
- Recorded: November 29, 1978
- Studio: Sweet Silence Studios, Copenhagen, Denmark
- Genre: Jazz
- Length: 42:10
- Label: SteepleChase; SCS 1130
- Producer: Nils Winther

Walt Dickerson chronology
| I Hear You John (1978) | To My Son (1980) | Life Rays (1982) |

To My Son is an album by vibraphonist Walt Dickerson recorded in 1978 for the SteepleChase label.

== Reception ==
Professional ratings
Review scores
| Source | Rating |
|---|---|
| Allmusic | 3/5 stars |
| The Penguin Guide to Jazz Recordings | 3/4 stars |

Allmusic gave the album 3 stars.

== Track listing ==
All compositions by Walt Dickerson

1. "You Can" – 11:31
2. "You Will" – 9:16
3. "It Is Done" – 8:08
4. "Thank You Son" – 11:15

== Personnel ==
- Walt Dickerson – vibraphone
- Andy McKee – bass
- Jimmi Johnsun – drums
