= Door of the Cage =

Studio album by Baikida Carroll
- Released: 1995
- Recorded: March 16–17, 1994
- Studio: Eastside Sound, New York City
- Genre: Free jazz
- Length: 1:01:04
- Label: Soul Note; 121123-2
- Producer: Baikida Carroll, Flavio Bonandrini

Baikida Carroll chronology
Shadows and Reflections (1982)	Door of the Cage (1995)	Marionettes on a High Wire (2001)

Door of the Cage is an album by trumpeter and composer Baikida Carroll. It was recorded on March 16 and 17, 1994, at Eastside Sound in New York City, and was released in 1995 by Soul Note. On the album, Carroll is joined by saxophonist Erica Lindsay, pianist Steve Adegoke Colson, double bassist Santi Debriano, and drummer Pheeroan akLaff.

== Reception ==
Professional ratings
Review scores
Source	Rating
AllMusic	4/5 stars
The Penguin Guide to Jazz	3.5/4 stars

In a review for AllMusic, Scott Yanow wrote: "The ten compositions are all Carroll's, and they cover a variety of moods and grooves. The music overall is more accessible than one would expect, making this an excellent introduction to Baikida Carroll's music."

The authors of The Penguin Guide to Jazz Recordings called the album an "enormously impressive record," and noted Carroll's "line-driven, melodic approach" and soft, "plangent tone." They commented: "There is still a brassy bite on numbers like "King" and "At Roi", which was originally written for [Julius] Hemphill... in friendly revenge for some of the charts he gave the young trumpeter to play."

== Track listing ==
Composed by Baikida Carroll.

1. "Door of the Cage" – 7:02
2. "King" – 8:11
3. "At Roi" – 7:14
4. "Against Your Warmth" – 6:59
5. "Speak" – 4:29
6. "Legacies" – 6:27
7. "I Thought You Knew" – 4:40
8. "Hannah Pearl" – 5:07
9. "I Need..." – 4:11
10. "Spade Hearts in Clubs" – 6:44

== Personnel ==
- Baikida Carroll – trumpet
- Erica Lindsay – tenor saxophone
- Steve Adegoke Colson – piano
- Santi Debriano – double bass
- Pheeroan akLaff – drums
