= Visions (Sun Ra album) =

Studio album by Sun Ra and Walt Dickerson
- Released: 1978
- Recorded: July 11, 1978
- Studio: C.I., NYC
- Genre: Jazz
- Length: 61:34
- Label: SteepleChase; SCS 1126
- Producer: Walt Dickerson

Sun Ra chronology
Disco 3000 (1978)	Visions (1978)	Lanquidity (1978)

Walt Dickerson chronology
To My Queen Revisited (1978)	Visions (1978)	Landscape with Open Door (1978)

Original Cover

Visions is a duet album issued on LP format credited to Walt Dickerson (with Sun Ra), and later reissued on CD credited to Sun Ra and Walt Dickerson.

== Reception ==
Professional ratings
Review scores
Source	Rating
AllMusic	4/5 stars
The Penguin Guide to Jazz Recordings	2.5/4 stars
The Rolling Stone Jazz Record Guide	3/5 stars
Spin Alternative Record Guide	9/10
DownBeat	4/5 stars

In his review for AllMusic, Stewart Mason stated: "Visions matches Walt Dickerson's cool vibes with Sun Ra's idiosyncratic piano in a way that shows both men's contrasting styles to surprisingly cohesive effect... Fans of Sun Ra's outer space mythology and chanting lyrics will have to look elsewhere for their fun, but fans of Ra's exceptionally gifted and distinctive free jazz piano playing should be fascinated. Dickerson, one of the few jazz vibraphonists to have little audible debt to Lionel Hampton, also plays with his characteristic exploratory but controlled style".

== Track listing ==
All compositions by Walt Dickerson.

1. "Astro" – 7:50
2. "Utopia" – 8:10
3. "Visions" – 2.50
4. "Constructive Neutrons" – 10:10
5. "Space Dance" – 8:10
6. "Light Years" – 15:18 Bonus track on CD reissue
7. "Prophesy" – 9:06 Bonus track on CD reissue

== Personnel ==
- Walt Dickerson: Vibraphone
- Sun Ra: Piano

== See also ==
- Sun Ra discography
