= I Hear You John =

Live album by Walt Dickerson & Jimmi Johnsun
- Released: 1980
- Recorded: October 2, 1978
- Venue: Værkstedet, Holbæk, Denmark
- Genre: Jazz
- Length: 73:24
- Label: SteepleChase; SCS 1146
- Producer: Nils Winther

Walt Dickerson chronology
Landscape with Open Door (1978)	I Hear You John (1980)	To My Son (1982)

I Hear You John is an album by vibraphonist Walt Dickerson and percussionist Jimmi Johnsun recorded in Denmark in 1978 for the SteepleChase label. This album was a dedication to the late saxophone legend, John Coltrane. The 1995 CD reissue added an additional track featuring Andy McKee.

== Reception ==
Professional ratings
Review scores
Source	Rating
AllMusic	3/5 stars
The Encyclopedia of Popular Music	3/5 stars
MusicHound Jazz	4/5 stars
The Penguin Guide to Jazz Recordings	3/4 stars

AllMusic gave the album 3 stars. The authors of The Penguin Guide to Jazz Recordings stated that "there is no mistaking the amount of emotion" that went into the recording, and commented: "As an attempt to make a record with another percussionist, it is fascinating."

== Track listing ==
All compositions by Walt Dickerson.

1. "I Hear You John" – 35:19
2. "We Wish You Well, Wilbur Ware" – 38:05 Bonus track on CD reissue

== Personnel ==
- Walt Dickerson – vibraphone
- Jimmi Johnsun – drums
- Andy McKee – bass (track 2)
