= Dream (Roland Hanna album) =

Studio album by Sir Roland Hanna
- Released: 2001
- Recorded: February 1, 2001
- Studio: The Studio, New York City, NY
- Genre: Jazz
- Length: 63:50
- Label: Venus; VHCD-2054
- Producer: Tetsuo Hara, Todd Barkan

Sir Roland Hanna chronology
Royal Essence (1999)	Dream (2001)	Milano, Paris, New York: Finding John Lewis (2002)

Dream is an album by pianist Sir Roland Hanna performing tunes associated with the Great American Songbook recorded in 2002 and released by the Japanese Venus label.

== Reception ==
Professional ratings
Review scores
Source	Rating
AllMusic	4.5/5 stars

AllMusic reviewer Ken Dryden stated "With seven of the 12 songs incorporating the word "dream" in their titles, it seemed to be a fitting title for the CD. ... Highly recommended".

== Track listing ==
1. "When I Grow Too Old to Dream" (Sigmund Romberg, Oscar Hammerstein II) – 4:59
2. "Street of Dreams" (Victor Young, Sam M. Lewis) – 4:17
3. "You Stepped Out of a Dream" (Nacio Herb Brown, Gus Kahn) – 6:04
4. "Day Dream" (Billy Strayhorn, John Latouche) – 6:39
5. "This Time the Dream's on Me" (Harold Arlen, Johnny Mercer) – 5:36
6. "Skylark" (Hoagy Carmichael, Mercer) – 4:33
7. "I Hear a Rhapsody" (George Fragos, Jack Baker, Dick Gasparre) – 6:06
8. "Dream) (Mercer) – 5:12
9. "So in Love" (Cole Porter) – 4:31
10. "Dream Dancing" (Porter) – 5:35
11. "A Sleepin' Bee" (Arlen, Truman Capote) – 4:27
12. "You Do Something to Me" (Porter) – 5:51

== Personnel ==
- Sir Roland Hanna – piano
- Paul West – bass
- Eddie Locke – drums
