= Child of Gemini =

Studio album by Roland Hanna
- Released: 1971
- Recorded: February 11 & 12, 1971
- Studio: MPS Tonstudio, Villagen, Black Forest, Germany
- Genre: Jazz
- Length: 39:13
- Label: MPS; SD 33-108
- Producer: Joachim-Ernst Berendt

Roland Hanna chronology
Easy to Love (1960)	Child of Gemini (1971)	Sir Elf (1973)

Child of Gemini is an album by pianist Roland Hanna recorded in Germany in 1971 and released by the MPS label.

== Reception ==
Professional ratings
Review scores
Source	Rating
AllMusic	3.5/5 stars

AllMusic reviewer Ken Dryden stated: "Sir Roland Hanna's 1971 sessions for MPS pairs the veteran pianist with bassist David Holland [sic] and drummer Daniel Humair, focusing exclusively on the leader's originals that were originally intended as a suite, though they stand very well individually, too. ... Overall, the music is not quite up to the level of other recordings under Hanna's leadership, though it is still a worthwhile LP". On All About Jazz, Marc Myers observed: "It's stormy, lyrical and loaded with innovative solo passages by all three musicians. Holland's bass solos are woody and superb while Humair's drumming has persistent force and a sense of freedom. Hanna is exceptional here and highly inventive. The Child of Gemini suite is exceptional and the trio together was delightfully percussive".

== Track listing ==
All compositions by Roland Hanna.

1. "Prelude - So You'll Know My Name" – 3:14
2. "Allemande-Dance" – 5:48
3. "Courrante-Blue" – 3:00
4. "Child of Gemini" – 3:47
5. "Arsenic and New Lace" – 4:20
6. "Ha-Ho-Da" – 6:57
7. "Blue Lilly" – 3:09
8. "A Statement for the Truth" – 8:58

== Personnel ==
- Roland Hanna – piano
- Dave Holland – bass
- Daniel Humair – drums
