= Blues for Sarka =

Live album by New York Jazz Quartet
- Released: 1978
- Recorded: May 17, 1978; The Domicile in Munich, West Germany
- Genre: Jazz
- Length: 45:11
- Label: Enja; ENJA 3025
- Producer: Horst Weber, Matthias Winckelmann

New York Jazz Quartet chronology
Song of the Black Knight (1977)	Blues for Sarka (1978)	New York Jazz Quartet in Chicago (1981)

Blues for Sarka is a live album by the New York Jazz Quartet, recorded in 1978 and released on the Enja label. George Mraz wrote the title track for his daughter.

== Reception ==
Professional ratings
Review scores
Source	Rating
AllMusic	4.5/5 stars

AllMusic awarded the album 4½ stars and reviewer Ken Dryden called it "easily one of the best releases by the New York Jazz Quartet".

== Track listing ==
All compositions by Roland Hanna except as indicated

1. "All Blues" (Miles Davis) – 15:29
2. "Rodney Round Robin" – 5:44
3. "I'll Tell You Tonite" (George Mraz) – 7:14
4. "Blues for Sarka" (Mraz) – 7:11
5. "Smelly Jelly Belly" – 9:33

== Personnel ==
- Frank Wess – flute, tenor saxophone
- Roland Hanna – piano
- George Mraz – bass
- Grady Tate – drums
