= Quintet (film) =

1979 film by Robert Altman

- Theatrical release poster
- Directed by: Robert Altman
- Written by: Frank Barhydt; Patricia Resnick; Robert Altman
- Story by: Robert Altman; Lionel Chetwynd; Patricia Resnick
- Produced by: Robert Altman
- Starring: Paul Newman; Vittorio Gassman; Fernando Rey; Bibi Andersson; Brigitte Fossey; Nina Van Pallandt
- Cinematography: Jean Boffety
- Edited by: Dennis M. Hill
- Music by: Tom Pierson
- Distributed by: 20th Century Fox
- Release date: February 9, 1979
- Running time: 118 minutes
- Country: United States
- Language: English
- Budget: $9.3 million
- Box office: $1.0 million

Quintet is a 1979 American post-apocalyptic science fiction film directed by Robert Altman. It stars Paul Newman, Brigitte Fossey, Bibi Andersson, Fernando Rey, Vittorio Gassman and Nina Van Pallandt.

Quintet was released on February 9, 1979, and it received negative reviews by the critics.

== Plot summary ==
During a second ice age, two people walk through a blank, frozen tundra, the seal hunter Essex and his pregnant companion Vivia, the daughter of one of Essex's late hunting partners. They are traveling north, where Essex hopes to reunite with his brother, Francha.

Essex and Vivia eventually find Francha's apartment, but the reunion is short-lived. While Essex is out buying firewood, a gambler named Redstone throws a bomb into Francha's apartment, killing everyone inside, including Vivia. Essex sees Redstone fleeing the scene and chases him to the sector's "Information Room". Essex witnesses the murder of Redstone by an Italian gambler named St. Christopher. When St. Christopher leaves, Essex searches Redstone's pockets and finds a piece of paper with a list of names: Francha, Redstone, Goldstar, Deuca, St. Christopher, and Ambrosia.

Puzzled by the mystery, Essex discovers that Redstone had previously checked into the Hotel Electra, a gambling resort in another sector. He visits the hotel and assumes Redstone's identity. Immediately after checking in, Essex is given an unexpected welcome by Grigor, who is the dealer in the casino. Insisting that he means no harm, Grigor invites Essex (as "Redstone") to the casino, where gamblers are now heavily involved in a "Quintet" tournament. While there he meets Ambrosia, who always assumes the role of the "sixth player" in the game.

Essex is unaware that the current Quintet tournament is a fight for the survival of the fittest. Those who are "killed" in game are executed in real life. Grigor and St. Christopher are aware that Essex is not the real Redstone, so they ignore him and focus on the other players. Goldstar is the first killed, followed by Deuca, until the only two players left are St. Christopher and Ambrosia. Ambrosia, however, insists that Essex be counted as a player in the game since he has assumed Redstone's identity. Grigor agrees and informs St. Christopher that he has to eliminate Essex before he can face off against Ambrosia.

Essex and St. Christopher have a showdown outside the city, where St. Christopher is killed by falling into a rupture of the ice sheet. Essex returns to Francha's apartment and finds the same list that Redstone had. Ambrosia follows Essex to the apartment. Essex slits her throat moments before her attempt to slit his throat.

Returning to the Hotel Electra to cremate Ambrosia's body, Essex confronts Grigor to demand his "prize", since he was the winner of Quintet. Grigor reveals that the only prize is the thrill of the game itself. Grigor insists he stay and participate in future tournaments, but a disgusted Essex condemns Quintet and leaves the hotel for good.

== Cast ==
- Paul Newman as Essex
- Vittorio Gassman as Saint Christopher
- Fernando Rey as Grigor
- Bibi Andersson as Ambrosia
- Brigitte Fossey as Vivia, Essex's Wife
- Nina Van Pallandt as Deuca
- David Langton as Goldstar
- Thomas Hill as Francha
- Monique Mercure as Redstone's Mate
- Craig Richard Nelson as Redstone
- Maruska Stankova as Jaspera
- Anne Gerety as Aeon
- Michel Maillot as Obelus
- Max Fleck as Wood Supplier
- Françoise Berd as Charity house woman

== Production ==
Robert Altman came up with the original idea but said he wanted Walter Hill to write and direct the film. He also told author/director Lionel Chetwynd of a dream he had about a fantastical game of chance that involved a quintet of players. He not only envisioned making a board game of it but also a film, provided that Chetwynd write a novella to serve as the basis for the film. Disagreements in the draft process led to this falling through. Writers such as Patricia Resnick were consulted for suggestions; she left the project early, not wanting to be present during filming in the cold and had another opportunity waiting. Frank Barhydt was brought in to work with Altman on the screenplay.

Quintet was filmed in early 1978 on the site of Montreal's Expo 67 world's fair. The extreme cold made the shoot challenging for the cast and crew. The soundtrack was recorded by the New York Philharmonic.

This was the first film for which Altman's son, Stephen Altman, served as property master.

At the time of the film's release, 20th Century Fox president Alan Ladd Jr. told Variety that Altman was not given final cut on what Ladd termed "a complicated picture".

== Reception ==
According to a report in Daily Variety, the film was "a financial disaster".

Reviews were mostly negative. Roger Ebert gave the film two stars out of four, calling it "a puzzlement, and not a very interesting one". Gene Siskel awarded one-and-a-half stars out of four, writing, "These are metaphors that college filmmakers wouldn't consider making into movies, but Altman somehow considers this profound. Actually, his script is derivative of the Italian comedy The Tenth Victim and Harlan Ellison's sci-fi parable A Boy and His Dog." Variety called it "Robert Altman's latest impenetrable exercise in self-indulgence".

Stanley Kauffmann of The New Republic described Quintet as "paralyzingly stupid: stupefied with a mumbling guttural pretentiousness".

Vincent Canby of The New York Times wrote, "Quintet is depressing not because it's about the end of the world, but because its artistic vision is feeble. Yet it's the work of one of the most original, vital, enterprising directors of our time. How to reconcile these facts? I'm not sure they can be." Gary Arnold of The Washington Post declared, "Robert Altman's Quintet, now at area theaters, earns a little five-sided niche next to Zardoz and The Heretic in the '70s memory album of pseudo-profound fiascoes." Pauline Kael of The New Yorker lamented that Altman was "giving weight to scenes that he would have treated as comedy skits only a few years ago ... with dialogue such as the diabolical Gassman's 'Hope is an obsolete word,' contrasted with the inspirational music as Newman presses on northward, it's like a Monty Python show played at the wrong speed."

Charles Champlin of the Los Angeles Times, however, wrote in a positive review: "It invites easy charges that it is self-indulgent and pretentious. Yet I am bound to say that I was fascinated by it. Like it or not, it is a true tour de force of film-making, an exercise in tone and atmosphere sustained from start to finish."

Jack Kroll wrote in Newsweek: "It's clear that the game of Quintet is Altman's metaphor for the erosion of art, philosophy and the humane activities of civilization. That's one of the weaknesses of the film - the game itself can't bear this symbolic weight ... But this is transcended by the strong acting and by the great beauty and hypnotic rhythm of the film."

On Rotten Tomatoes, the film has an approval rating of 27% based on 11 reviews.
