= Time for the Dancers =

Studio album by Roland Hanna
- Released: 1977
- Recorded: February 17, 1977
- Studio: Downtown Sound Studio, New York City, NY
- Genre: Jazz
- Length: 46:32
- Label: Progressive; 7012
- Producer: Gus Statiras

Roland Hanna chronology
24 Preludes Book 1 (1976)	Time for the Dancers (1977)	Sir Elf Plus 1 (1977)

Time for the Dancers (also released as At Home with Friends) is an album by pianist Roland Hanna recorded in New York in 1977 and released by the Progressive label.

== Reception ==
Professional ratings
Review scores
Source	Rating
AllMusic	3/5 stars

AllMusic reviewer Scott Yanow stated: "The interplay between the players, the wide variety of moods covered, and the general swinging feel of the music makes this a recommended set".

== Track listing ==
All compositions by Roland Hanna except where noted

1. "Cheryl" (Charlie Parker) – 9:39
2. "Time for the Dancers" – 7:55
3. "Flight to Ann's Ville" – 5:43
4. "Ode to a Potato Plant" – 7:47
5. "Jed" (George Mraz) – 6:58
6. "Double Intentions" – 8:30

== Personnel ==
- Roland Hanna – piano
- George Mraz – bass
- Richard Pratt – drums
