= Life Rays =

Studio album by Walt Dickerson, Sirone, Andrew Cyrille
- Released: 1982
- Recorded: February 4–5, 1982
- Studio: Barigozzi Studios, Milan, Italy
- Genre: Jazz
- Length: 45:45
- Label: Soul Note; SN 121 028
- Producer: Giovanni Bonandrini

Walt Dickerson chronology
To My Son (1978)	Life Rays (1982)

Sirone chronology
Artistry (1979)	Life Rays (1982)	Sirone's Concord (2003)

Life Rays is an album by vibraphonist Walt Dickerson, bassist Sirone, and drummer Andrew Cyrille. Dickerson's final release, it was recorded in Italy in 1982 for the Soul Note label.

== Reception ==
Professional ratings
Review scores
Source	Rating
AllMusic	3/5 stars
The Penguin Guide to Jazz Recordings	3/4 stars

AllMusic gave the album 3 stars.

The authors of the Penguin Guide to Jazz Recordings wrote: "In the dynamic company of Sirone and Cyrille, Walt emerges as a particular kind of modernist, a radical-conservative... Dickerson seems to be striking harder than usual, Cyrille is faultless and the music has a strongly percussive quality. Sirone is magnificent whenever soloing..."

Writing for JazzTimes, Duck Baker commented that Dickerson's "conception of melodic/percussive development is really his own. He may at times sound impressionistic, as when he creates such long shimmering lines that they cease to be heard as lines and become a sonic waterfall, but it’s not just a pretty thing." Regarding Sirone and Cyrille, he stated: "The context calls for the utmost in understatement and controlled passion, and even staunch fans of these two may be surprised at how well they answer the call."

== Track listing ==
All compositions by Walt Dickerson except where noted.

1. "No Ordinary Man" – 9:02
2. "Good Relationship" – 13:37
3. "Life Rays" – 4:42
4. "It Ain't Necessarily So" (George Gershwin, Ira Gershwin) – 18:06

== Personnel ==
- Walt Dickerson – vibraphone
- Sirone – bass
- Andrew Cyrille – drums
