= Peace (Walt Dickerson album) =

Studio album by Walt Dickerson Trio
- Released: 1976
- Recorded: November 14, 1975
- Studio: C.I. Recording Studio, New York City
- Genre: Jazz
- Length: 49:15
- Label: SteepleChase; SCS 1042
- Producer: Nils Winther

Walt Dickerson chronology
| Tell Us Only the Beautiful Things (1974) | Peace (1976) | Walt Dickerson 1976 (1976) |

Peace is an album recorded by composer and vibraphonist Walt Dickerson in 1975 for the SteepleChase label.

== Reception ==
Professional ratings
Review scores
| Source | Rating |
|---|---|
| Allmusic | 3/5 stars |
| The Penguin Guide to Jazz Recordings | 3.5/4 stars |

Allmusic gave the album 3 stars.

== Track listing ==
All compositions by Walt Dickerson.

1. "Universal Peace" – 17:47
2. "Chant of Peace" – 28:10
3. "Warm Up" – 3:18 Bonus track on CD reissue

== Personnel ==
- Walt Dickerson – vibraphone
- Lisle Atkinson – bass
- Andrew Cyrille – drums
