= Tenderness (Walt Dickerson and Richard Davis album) =

Studio album by Walt Dickerson and Richard Davis
- Released: 1985
- Recorded: February 9, 1977
- Studio: C.I. Recording Studio, NYC
- Genre: Jazz
- Length: 35:16
- Label: SteepleChase; SCS 1213
- Producer: Nils Winther

Walt Dickerson chronology
Divine Gemini (1977)	Tenderness (1985)	Shades of Love (1977)

Richard Davis chronology
Divine Gemini (1977)	Tenderness (1977)	Persia My Dear (1987)

Tenderness is an album of duets by vibraphonist Walt Dickerson and bassist Richard Davis recorded in 1977 for the SteepleChase label but not released until 1985.

== Reception ==
Professional ratings
Review scores
Source	Rating
Allmusic	4/5 stars
The Penguin Guide to Jazz Recordings	3/4 stars

Allmusic reviewer Scott Yanow said "Although the music is often complex and a touch esoteric, the attractive sound of the intimate duo makes the performances much more accessible than they would normally be".

== Track listing ==
All compositions by Walt Dickerson

1. "Tenderness" - 9:40
2. "Divine Gemini" - 3:39
3. "So Thoughtful" - 4:47
4. "The Road Must Bend" - 9:02
5. "Play Son Play" - 8:08

== Personnel ==
- Walt Dickerson - vibraphone
- Richard Davis - bass
