= This Is Walt Dickerson! =

Studio album by Walt Dickerson
- Released: 1961
- Recorded: March 7, 1961
- Studio: Van Gelder Studio, Englewood Cliffs, New Jersey
- Genre: Jazz
- Length: 37:58
- Label: New Jazz; NJLP 8254
- Producer: Esmond Edwards

Walt Dickerson chronology
This Is Walt Dickerson! (1961)	A Sense of Direction (1961)

This Is Walt Dickerson! is the groundbreaking debut album by American jazz vibraphonist and composer Walt Dickerson, recorded on March 7, 1961, at Van Gelder Studio and released later that year by New Jazz. Renowned for its innovative approach and expressive intensity, the album not only introduced Dickerson's highly individual style to the jazz world but also established his reputation as a forward-thinking musician. Blending lyrical compositions with bold improvisation, Dickerson's debut album is celebrated as a significant contribution to post-bop jazz and marked the beginning of a remarkable recording career..

== Background and Production ==
Walt Dickerson arrived on the scene with a distinct musical voice, diverging from the influences of noted vibraphonists such as Lionel Hampton and Milt Jackson. The album was produced by Esmond Edwards and featured a quartet including Austin Crowe (piano), Bob Lewis (bass), and Andrew Cyrille (drums). Recorded at the legendary Rudy Van Gelder Studio, the session captured Dickerson’s forward-thinking jazz sensibility in a space renowned for its acoustics and role in shaping the sound of modern jazz.

== Composition and Musical Style ==
Dickerson’s compositional style on the album encompasses subtle tension between tradition and experiment, resulting in a set described as both hypnotic and charged with emotion. Tracks range from modal swingers (“Infinite You”), blues (“Time”), ballads (“Elizabeth,” “Evelyn”), and waltzes (“Death and Taxes”), each distinguished by Dickerson’s characteristic use of double-timing and expressive note choices. Dickerson is noted for his willingness to exploit the metal properties of the vibraphone, creating a unique and metallic timbre that set him apart from contemporaries.

== Reception ==
Professional ratings
Review scores
Source	Rating
AllMusic	4.5/5 stars
DownBeat	4.5/5 stars
The Penguin Guide to Jazz Recordings	3/4 stars

The AllMusic reviewer stated: "A striking debut, This Is Walt Dickerson! sets the stage for continued excellence, but also proves that Dickerson's talent was already fully formed." DownBeat reviewer Don DeMichael wrote: "Dickerson plays the whole instrument, not just part of it. But more important than his approach to the instrument is Dickerson's approach to music. The challenge he throws at himself and the listener outweighs other considerations one might have... what he offers in this album is far above the usual. This album is experience-giving and provocative."

== Track listing ==
All compositions by Walt Dickerson

1. "Time" - 6:29
2. "Elizabeth" - 5:07
3. "The Cry" - 7:01
4. "Death and Taxes" - 6:06
5. "Evelyn" - 6:14
6. "Infinite You" - 7:01

== Personnel ==
- Walt Dickerson – vibraphone
- Austin Crowe – piano
- Bob Lewis – bass
- Andrew Cyrille – drums
