= Carrie Smith =

American blues and jazz singer

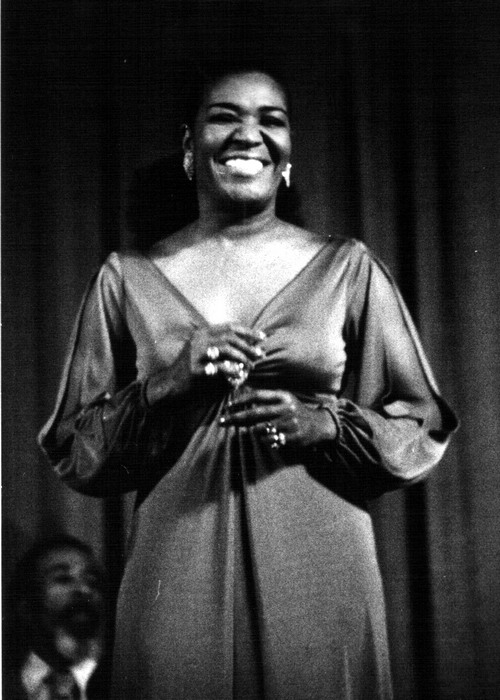
- Carrie Smith with Eddie Locke, 1977

Background information
- Born: Carrie Louise Smith; August 25, 1925; Fort Gaines, Georgia, U.S.
- Died: May 20, 2012 (aged 86) Englewood, New Jersey, U.S.
- Genre: Jazz
- Occupation: Singer

Carrie Louise Smith (August 25, 1925 – May 20, 2012) was an American blues and jazz singer. She was not well known in the United States, but had more success in Europe.

== Career ==
Smith was born in Fort Gaines, Georgia, United States. She was a member of a church choir that performed at the 1957 Newport Jazz Festival. In the early 1960s, Smith appeared on TV Gospel Time, a show designed to appeal to black audiences. She first won notice singing with Big Tiny Little in the early 1970s, but became internationally known in 1974 when she played Bessie Smith (to whom she is of no relation) in Dick Hyman's Satchmo Remembered at Carnegie Hall. Smith then launched a solo career, performing with the New York Jazz Repertory Orchestra, Tyree Glenn (1973), Yank Lawson (1987), and the World's Greatest Jazz Band, in addition to recording numerous solo albums. She starred in the Broadway musical Black and Blue from 1989 to 1991. The liner notes to the CD reissue of Only You Can Do It, featured laudatory remarks from jazz critics Rex Reed, Leonard Feather, Richard Sudhalter, and John S. Wilson. The album, produced by Ben Arrigo for GPRT Records, featured the compositions of Gladys Shelley.

== Discography ==
=== As leader/co-leader ===
- Do Your Duty (Black & Blue, 1976)
- When You're Down and Out (Black & Blue, 1977)
- Carrie Smith (West 54, 1979)
- Gospel Time (Black & Blue, 1982)
- Fine and Mellow (Audiophile, 1983)
- Only You Can Do It (GP, 1983)
- June Night (Black & Blue, 1993) – recorded in 1992
- Every Now and Then (Silver Shadow, 1994)
- I've Got a Right to Sing the Blues with Roland Hanna (IPO, 2002)
- Since I Fell for You (Squatty Roo, 2015)

=== As guest ===
- Doc Cheatham, Buddy Tate, Hank Jones, Harlem on Parade 77 (Black and Blue, 1977)
- Wycliffe Gordon, The Gospel Truth (Criss Cross, 2000)
- Winard Harper, Faith (Savant, 2000)
- Clark Terry, Live on QE2 (Chiaroscuro, 2001)
- Bross Townsend, I Love Jump Jazz (Claves, 1995)
