= Sumi Tonooka =

American jazz pianist and composer (born 1956)

- Born: October 3, 1956 (age 69)
- Genres: Jazz
- Occupations: Musician, composer
- Instrument: Piano
- Website: sumitonooka.com

Sumi Tonooka (born October 3, 1956) is an American jazz pianist and composer.

== Life ==
Tonooka has an African American father and a Japanese American mother. She earned her B.A in music from the Philadelphia College of Performing Arts.

Throughout her career, Tonooka has worked as a jazz pianist with musicians such as Kenny Burrell, Little Jimmy Scott, Sonny Fortune, Red Rodney, Benny Golson, Erica Lindsay, Odean Pope, Philly Joe Jones, and David Fathead Newman.

In 1985, she was commissioned by the Japanese American Cultural Association to write a piece based on the experiences of her mother, who was interned at Manzanar, California, during the Second World War. This work, Out from the Silence, incorporates the koto and shakuhachi alongside standard jazz instrumentation. The work was used in the soundtrack for the film Susumu in 1991.

In addition to her activities as a musician, Tonooka has contributed as a composer to numerous film scores, such as the documentary Queen of the Mountain (2005). She has also taught piano at Bard College and at Dutchess Community College in New York and worked as an assistant to Kenny Barron at Rutgers University.

== Discography ==
- With an Open Heart (with Rufus Reid, Akira Tana) (1990)
- Taking Time (with Craig Handy, Rufus Reid, Akira Tana) (1991)
- Here Comes Kai (with Rufus Reid, Lewis Nash) (1992)
- Secret Places (with Rufus Reid, Lewis Nash) (1998)
- Kindred Spirits (with John Blake Jr.) (2000)
- Long Ago Today (with Rufus Reid, Bob Braye) (2005)
- Initiation (with Erica Lindsay, Rufus Reid, Bob Braye) (2009)
- Now (Solo Live at the Howland) (2012)
- Under the Surface (2025)
