= Artistry (album) =

Studio album by Sirone
- Released: 1979
- Recorded: July 5, 1978
- Studio: Generation Sound, New York City
- Genre: Free jazz
- Label: Of The Cosmos; OTC 801
- Producer: Jim Silverman

Sirone chronology
Artistry (1979)	Life Rays (1982)

Artistry is an album by bassist Sirone, his first as a leader. It was recorded on July 5, 1978, at Generation Sound in New York City, and was released in 1979 by the Of The Cosmos label. On the album, Sirone is joined by flutist James Newton, cellist Muneer Bernard Fennell, and percussionist Don Moye. Liner notes were provided by Stanley Crouch.

== Reception ==
Professional ratings
Review scores
Source	Rating
AllMusic	4.5/5 stars
The Encyclopedia of Popular Music	3/5 stars
MusicHound Jazz	3.5/5 stars

The editors of AllMusic awarded the album 4½ stars. Reviewer Michael G. Nastos called it "very enjoyable."

Jon Dale, writing for Fact Magazine, commented: "it's a beautiful set, with James Newton's flute giving the quartet performances a breathy lilt, while the interaction between Sirone on bass and Muneer Bernard Fennell... on cello is lovely, particularly when Sirone is playing arco: parts of 'Circumstances' feel like they're levitating on lambent strings... Famoudou Don Moye... is a sympathetic, apposite percussionist too." Dale stated that the album's "most potent moment" is "when Sirone is playing solo, singing out from and stretching the parameters of the instrument, running rivulets of melody down the instrument's spine on 'Breath of Life'."

In his book Vinyl Freak, John Corbett described the album as "a lost treasure," and commented: "Cool cover with tipped-on corrugated cardboard frame, liner notes by Stanley Crouch, before the opening bell in New York's jazz wars had been sounded."

Phil Freeman of Burning Ambulance remarked: "Artistry is a stunning album unlike anything else of its era. Sirone and company came up with a collective music that combines avant-garde jazz, modern composition, and the joy of pure sound."

== Track listing ==
All compositions by Sirone.

1. "Illusions of Reality" – 5:47
2. "Breath of Life" – 13:56
3. "Circumstances" – 8:05
4. "Libido" – 14:13

== Personnel ==
- James Newton – flute
- Muneer Bernard Fennell – cello
- Sirone – bass
- Don Moye – percussion
