= Jazz Improv (magazine) =

American jazz magazine (1997–2009)

Jazz Improv, Jazz Improv NY, and Jazz Inside
- Editor: Eric Nemeyer; Jennifer Nemeyer; Gary Heimbauer
- Frequency: Quarterly
- Format: Hardcopy, PDF, online
- Publisher: Eric Nemeyer; Jenkintown, Pennsylvania; E.S. Proteus, Inc. Grafton, Vermont; Eric Nemeyer Corporation; Elkins Park, Pennsylvania
- Founder: Eric Nemeyer
- Founded: 1997
- First issue: Winter 1998 (issued December 1997)
- Final issue Number: June–July 2009 (12 years); Vol. 9, No. 4
- Language: English
- Website: www.jazzinsidemagazine.com
- ISSN: 2150-3397
- OCLC: 705484080

Jazz Improv (1997-2009) was an influential quarterly magazine established in 1997 by Eric Nemeyer. The articles featured jazz artists, music analysis, jazz history, and other commentary. The final issue ran June–July 2009 (vol. 9, no. 4).

== History ==
The first issue was dated Winter 1998. Each issue of Jazz Improv contained from 160 to 304 pages, and often included 1 or 2 companion CDs that featured full-track performances of jazz artists. Nemeyer, doing business from inception as E.S. Proteus, Inc., then beginning around 2002, as Eric Nemeyer Corporation, both Pennsylvania entities, is, as of February 2019, the sole shareholder of both companies – both companies are, as of 2019, active. For a short time, around 2001, E.S. Proteus, Inc., was a Vermont entity; but that entity is currently inactive.

The June–July 2009 issue (vol. 9, no. 4) was the final issue of Jazz Improv. Also, in 2009, Nemeyer published the final issue of Jazz Improv NY.

== Sister publications and spinoffs ==
In 2005, Nemeyer, launched a monthly publication, Jazz Improv NY in hardcopy and digital formats. The monthly publication featured interviews, reviews, articles, and comprehensive listings of jazz events. In October 2007, Nemeyer, produced Jazz Improv LIVE, a four-day convention at the New Yorker Hotel, which featured some 80 panels and workshops and 100 performances by jazz artists.

In the Winter 2010 issue (vol. 8, no. 4), Nemeyer launched Jazz Inside (in hardcopy and digital), a free quarterly magazine distributed mostly at music oriented venues – jazz clubs, performance venues, retail outlets, tourist centers, school music programs – in the New York City area.

== Editors ==
=== Jazz Improv ===
- Eric Henry Nemeyer
- Jennifer Nemeyer
- John Barrett, Jr.

=== Jazz Inside ===
- Gary Heimbauer
