= Milano, Paris, New York: Finding John Lewis =

Studio album by Sir Roland Hanna
- Released: June 26, 2002
- Recorded: April 1, 2002
- Studio: The Studio, New York City, NY
- Genre: Jazz
- Length: 57:03
- Label: Venus; VHCD-2031
- Producer: William F. Sorin

Sir Roland Hanna chronology
Dream (2001)	Milano, Paris, New York: Finding John Lewis (2002)	Everything I Love (2002)

Milano, Paris, New York: Finding John Lewis is an album by pianist Sir Roland Hanna performing compositions associated with John Lewis recorded in 2002 and released by the Japanese Venus label.

== Reception ==
Professional ratings
Review scores
Source	Rating
AllMusic	3/5 stars

AllMusic reviewer Judith Schlesinger stated "This CD represents one venerable pianist paying tribute to another: Sir Roland Hanna and his fine trio playing compositions by, associated with, or written for John Lewis, the musical director of the Modern Jazz Quartet for all of its life. Lewis was admired for his distinctive bop playing and his creative involvement with one of the greatest groups in jazz history, but only one of his originals has become a standard ... In fact, the standouts on this CD are actually Hanna's pieces ... Overall, a genteel and refined session".

== Track listing ==
All compositions by John Lewis except where noted

1. "Django" – 6:09
2. "Skating in Central Park" – 5:32
3. "Afternoon in Paris" – 6:58
4. "Milano" – 5:54
5. "Bag's Groove" (Milt Jackson) – 6:11
6. "New York 19" – 7:16
7. "Portrait of John Lewis" (Roland Hanna) – 7:57
8. "The Clarion Bells of Zurich" (Hanna) – 5:17
9. "Perugia" (Hanna) – 5:49

== Personnel ==
- Sir Roland Hanna – piano
- George Mraz – bass
- Lewis Nash – drums
