= Everything I Love (Roland Hanna album) =

Studio album by Sir Roland Hanna
- Released: October 29, 2002
- Recorded: June 2002
- Studio: SUNY Performing Arts Center, Purchase, NY
- Genre: Jazz
- Length: 72:11
- Label: IPO; IPOC1002
- Producer: William F. Sorin

Sir Roland Hanna chronology
Milano, Paris, New York: Finding John Lewis (2002)	Everything I Love (2002)	Tributaries: Reflections on Tommy Flanagan (2003)

Everything I Love is a solo album by pianist Sir Roland Hanna recorded in 2002 and released by IPO Recordings.

== Reception ==
Professional ratings
Review scores
Source	Rating
AllMusic	4/5 stars
The Penguin Guide to Jazz Recordings	3/4 stars

AllMusic reviewer Scott Yanow stated, "On Everything I Love, one of pianist Sir Roland Hanna's final recordings, he is in a relaxed mood, digging into a variety of strong melodies. Hanna, who is heard throughout playing solo, strides lightly, alters the mood and tempos enough to keep one's interest, and shows that he was a masterful interpreter. ... Hanna's style was based in swing but open to bop and later styles, and since he was very much a two-handed pianist, his solo outing is a constant delight."

In JazzTimes, Doug Ramsey wrote, "His repertoire in the solo album Everything I Love consists mostly of standards and reflects a love of minor keys that encourage his blues leanings. ... Through this collection of 13 songs, Hanna entertains and enlightens with inspiration and an eclecticism that never interferes with his ability to get to the heart of the music."

On All About Jazz, C. Michael Bailey said, "Sir Roland Hanna has left us a beautiful love letter in the form of Everything I Love. We are blessed that he thought of us before leaving."

== Track listing ==
1. "Comedy Tonight" (Stephen Sondheim) – 3:19
2. "Bags - A Tribute" (Roland Hanna) – 5:23
3. "Lullaby of the Leaves" (Bernice Petkere, Joe Young) – 2:48
4. "I Hear a Rhapsody" (George Fragos, Jack Baker, Dick Gasparre) – 6:30
5. "You'd Be So Nice to Come Home To" (Cole Porter) – 5:22
6. "Send in the Clowns" (Sondheim) – 4:50
7. "In the Blue of the Evening" (Al D'Artega, Tom Adair) – 5:26
8. "All Blues" (Miles Davis) – 5:57
9. "Comes Autumn" (Hanna) – 7:18
10. "Embraceable You" (George Gershwin, Ira Gershwin) – 6:30
11. "How Deep Is the Ocean?" (Irving Berlin) – 7:24
12. "Alone Together" (Arthur Schwartz, Howard Dietz) – 6:45
13. "Ev'rything I Love" (Porter) – 4:39

== Personnel ==
- Sir Roland Hanna – piano
