= To My Queen =

Studio album by Walt Dickerson
- Released: 1963
- Recorded: September 21, 1962
- Studio: Van Gelder Studio, Englewood Cliffs, New Jersey
- Genre: Jazz
- Length: 32:31
- Label: New Jazz; NJLP 8283
- Producer: Esmond Edwards

Walt Dickerson chronology
Relativity (1962)	To My Queen (1963)	Jazz Impressions of Lawrence of Arabia (1963)

To My Queen is an album led by vibraphonist and composer Walt Dickerson recorded in 1962 and released on the New Jazz label.

== Reception ==
Professional ratings
Review scores
Source	Rating
Allmusic	5/5 stars
Down Beat	5/5 stars
The Penguin Guide to Jazz Recordings	4/4 stars

The Allmusic reviewer stated: "The whole album is swathed in a gauzy glow that speaks even more eloquently than its creator's conceptual ambition; this is music from the heart as well as the mind". Down Beat reviewer Don Nelson wrote: "This tribute from Dickerson to his wife constitutes some of the finest jazz I have heard this year. It is necessary listening not only to those interested in the forward march of Walt Dickerson, but to those interested in the forward march of jazz".

== Track listing ==
1. "To My Queen" (Walt Dickerson) - 17:32
2. "How Deep Is the Ocean?" (Irving Berlin) - 11:05
3. "God Bless the Child" (Billie Holiday, Arthur Herzog, Jr.) - 3:54

== Personnel ==
- Walt Dickerson – vibraphone
- Andrew Hill – piano
- George Tucker – bass
- Andrew Cyrille – drums
