= Tell Us Only the Beautiful Things =

Studio album by Walt Dickerson
- Released: 1975
- Recorded: July 21, 1975
- Studio: Virtue Recording Studio, Philadelphia, PA
- Genre: Jazz
- Length: 41:08
- Label: Whynot; PA 7118
- Producer: Masahiko Yuh

Walt Dickerson chronology
Vibes in Motion (1968)	Tell Us Only the Beautiful Things (1975)	Peace (1976)

Tell Us Only the Beautiful Things is an album by vibraphonist Walt Dickerson recorded in 1975 for the Japanese Whynot label.

== Track listing ==
All compositions by Walt Dickerson

1. "The Nexus" – 22:34
2. "Tell Us Only the Beautiful Things" – 18:30

== Personnel ==
- Walt Dickerson – vibraphone
- Wilbur Ware – bass
- Andrew Cyrille – drums
