= Shades of Love (album) =

Studio album by Walt Dickerson
- Released: 1978
- Recorded: November 6, 1977
- Studio: Mediasound (New York City)
- Genre: Jazz
- Length: 47:38
- Label: SteepleChase; SCS 1115
- Producer: Nils Winther

Walt Dickerson chronology
Tenderness (1977)	Shades of Love (1978)	To My Queen Revisited (1978)

Shades of Love is a solo album by vibraphonist Walt Dickerson performing on two vibraphones which was recorded direct to disc in 1977 for the SteepleChase label.

== Reception ==
Professional ratings
Review scores
Source	Rating
Allmusic	3/5 stars
The Penguin Guide to Jazz Recordings	3/4 stars
DownBeat	4.5/5 stars

Allmusic gave the album 3 stars.

== Track listing ==
All compositions by Walt Dickerson.

1. "Infinite Love" – 13:41
2. "Love Is You" – 4:15
3. "Interim Love" – 5:17
4. "Infinite Love" [Take 2] – 4:30 Bonus track on CD reissue

== Personnel ==
- Walt Dickerson – vibraphone
