= Edgar Bateman (drummer) =

American drummer (1929–2010)

Edgar Leon Bateman, Jr.
- Born: January 11, 1929; St. Louis, Missouri, U.S.
- Died: May 18, 2010 (aged 81) Philadelphia, Pennsylvania, U.S.
- Genres: Jazz, avant-garde jazz
- Occupation: Musician
- Instrument: Drums
- Years active: 1960–2009
- Labels: Fontana, Whynot

Edgar Leon Bateman Jr. (January 11, 1929 – May 18, 2010) was an American jazz drummer. He first recorded with Walt Dickerson and would later work with Eric Dolphy, Herbie Hancock, and Booker Ervin. His final recording was with Khan Jamal. He neither smoked nor drank alcohol and was said to be health conscious. He had rheumatic fever as a child and was from St. Louis. In St. Louis he and Oliver Nelson were in high school band together.

== Discography ==
=== As sideman ===
With Walt Dickerson

- A Sense of Direction (New Jazz, 1961)
- Plays Unity (Audio Fidelity, 1964)
- Walt Dickerson 1976 (Whynot, 1976)
- Serendipity (SteepleChase, 1977)

With others

- Dave Burns, Dave Burns (Vanguard, 1962)
- Ted Curson, Urge (Fontana, 1966)
- Orrin Evans, Blessed Ones (Criss Cross 2001)
- Khan Jamal, Impressions of Coltrane (SteepleChase, 2009)
- John Handy, Jazz: John Handy III (Roulette, 1962)
- Ken McIntyre, Way Way Out (United Artists, 1963)
- Jamaaladeen Tacuma, The Night of Chamber Music (Moers Music, 1993)
