= List of works by Dizzy Gillespie =

This is a list of works by American jazz musician Dizzy Gillespie.

== Discography ==
=== As leader ===
==== Studio albums ====
===== 10" LPs =====
Year	Title	Label	Notes
1951	Dizzy Gillespie Plays Johnny Richards Conducts	Discovery	conducted by Johnny Richards
1952	Dizzy Gillespie	Dee Gee	
1952	Dizzy Gillespie – Vol. 2	Dee Gee	
1952	Dizzy, Volume I	Atlantic	as Dizzy Gillespie and His Orchestra
1952	Dizzy, Volume II	Atlantic	
1952	Bird and Diz	Mercury/Clef	with Charlie Parker
1953	Horn of Plenty	Blue Note	
1953	Dizzy in Paris	Swing/Contemporary	reissued by Vogue in 1955
1953	Dizzy Gillespie Plays in Paris	Vogue	reissued as Dizzy Gillespie Plays in 1954
1954	The Dizzy Gillespie Stan Getz Sextet	Norgran	with Stan Getz; reissued on Diz and Getz
1954	More of the Dizzy Gillespie Stan Getz Sextet (Album 2)	Norgran	with Stan Getz; reissued on Diz and Getz

===== 12" LPs =====
Year	Title	Label	Notes
Verve years: 1952–1961
1954	Roy and Diz	Clef	with Roy Eldridge; reissued on Roy and Diz
1954	Roy and Diz #2	Clef	with Roy Eldridge; reissued on Roy and Diz
1954	Afro	Norgran	
1954	Dizzy and Strings	Norgran	also released as Diz Big Band
1955	Jazz Recital	Norgran	
1956	The Modern Jazz Sextet	Norgran	as The Modern Jazz Sextet
1956	World Statesman	Norgran	
1957	Dizzy in Greece	Verve	
1957	For Musicians Only	Verve	with Stan Getz and Sonny Stitt
1957	Dizzy Gillespie and Stuff Smith	Verve	with Stuff Smith
1958	Birks' Works	Verve	
1958	Sittin' In	Verve	with Stan Getz and Coleman Hawkins
1958	Duets	Verve	with Sonny Rollins and Sonny Stitt
1959	Sonny Side Up	Verve	with Sonny Stitt and Sonny Rollins
1959	The Ebullient Mr. Gillespie	Verve	
1959	Have Trumpet, Will Excite!	Verve	
1959	The Greatest Trumpet of Them All	Verve	as The Dizzy Gillespie Octet featuring Benny Golson
1960	A Portrait of Duke Ellington	Verve	arranged by Clare Fischer
1960	Gillespiana	Verve	composed and arranged by Lalo Schifrin
1961	Perceptions	Verve	composed and arranged by J.J. Johnson, conducted by Gunther Schuller
1962–1975
1963	New Wave!	Philips	
1963	Something Old, Something New	Philips	
1964	Dizzy Gillespie and the Double Six of Paris	Philips	
1964	Dizzy Goes Hollywood	Philips	
1964	The Cool World	Philips	
1964	Jambo Caribe	Limelight	
1965	The New Continent	Limelight	composed and arranged by Lalo Schifrin
1967	The Melody Lingers On	Limelight	
1969	It's My Way	Solid State	also released as My Way
1970	Cornucopia	Solid State	
1970	The Real Thing	Perception	featuring James Moody
1970	Portrait of Jenny	Perception	
1975	The Bop Session	Sonet	with Sonny Stitt, John Lewis, Hank Jones, Percy Heath, Max Roach
Pablo years: 1975–1983
1975	Dizzy Gillespie's Big 4	Pablo	also released as Dizzy's Big 4
1975	Oscar Peterson and Dizzy Gillespie	Pablo	with Oscar Peterson
1976	Afro-Cuban Jazz Moods	Pablo	with Machito
1976	Bahiana	Pablo	2xLP
1976	Carter, Gillespie Inc.	Pablo	with Benny Carter
1977	Dizzy's Party	Pablo	as The Dizzy Gillespie 6
1977	Free Ride	Pablo	composed and arranged by Lalo Schifrin
1978	Jazz Maturity... Where It's Coming From	Pablo	with Roy Eldridge
1979	The Gifted Ones	Pablo	with Count Basie
1980	The Trumpet Summit Meets the Oscar Peterson Big 4	Pablo	with Freddie Hubbard, Clark Terry, Oscar Peterson
1982	The Alternate Blues	Pablo	with Freddie Hubbard, Clark Terry, Oscar Peterson
1983	To a Finland Station	Pablo	with Arturo Sandoval
1984–1990
1984	Closer to the Source	Atlantic	
1985	New Faces	GRP	
1987	Dizzy Gillespie Meets Phil Woods Quintet	Timeless	with Phil Woods
1988	Endlessly	Impulse!	
1989	The Symphony Sessions	ProJazz	also released as A Night in Tunisia (Fast Choice, 1991) with Rochester Philharmonic conducted by Johnny Dankworth; with Ron Holloway, Ed Cherry, John Lee, Ignacio Berroa
1990	The Winter in Lisbon	Milan Entertainment	original soundtrack

==== Live albums ====
Year	Title	Label	Notes
1953	Dizzy Over Paris	Royal Roost	10" LP
1953	Jazz at Massey Hall	Debut	as The Quintet, with Charlie Parker, Bud Powell, Charles Mingus, Max Roach
1953	The Fabulous Pleyel Jazz Concert, Vol. 1	Vogue/Swing	10" LP; as Dizzy Gillespie and His Orchestra
1953	The Fabulous Pleyel Jazz Concert, Vol. 2	Vogue/Swing	10" LP; as Dizzy Gillespie and His Orchestra
1954	Dizzy Gillespie and His Orchestra Featuring Chano Pozo	Vogue	10" LP
1956	A Night at Carnegie Hall with Charlie Parker and Dizzy Gillespie	Birdland	10" LP
1957	In Concert	GNP Crescendo	expanded reissue of Dizzy Gillespie and His Orchestra Featuring Chano Pozo
1957	Dizzy Gillespie at Newport	Verve	
1961	An Electrifying Evening with the Dizzy Gillespie Quintet	Verve	
1961	Carnegie Hall Concert	Verve	
1962	Dizzy on the French Riviera	Philips	arranged by Lalo Schifrin
1967	Swing Low, Sweet Cadillac	Impulse!	
1968	Live at the Village Vanguard	Solid State	
1968	The Dizzy Gillespie Reunion Big Band	MPS	
1971	Giants	Perception	also released as Mary Lou Williams and the Trumpet Giants; with Bobby Hackett, Mary Lou Williams
1971	Dizzy Gillespie and the Mitchell Ruff Duo in Concert	Mainstream	with Willie Ruff, Dwike Mitchell
1972	The Giants of Jazz	Atlantic	with Art Blakey, Al McKibbon, Thelonious Monk, Sonny Stitt, Kai Winding
1973	The Giant	America	
1973	The Source	America	
1975	The Dizzy Gillespie Big 7 at the Montreux Jazz Festival	Pablo	
1975	The Trumpet Kings at Montreux '75	Pablo	as The Trumpet Kings; with Roy Eldridge, Clark Terry, Oscar Peterson
1977	Montreux '77: Dizzy Gillespie Jam	Pablo Live	
1980	Digital at Montreux, 1980	Pablo Live	
1982	Musician-Composer-Raconteur	Pablo Live	2xLP
1983	One Night in Washington	Elektra Musician	
1990	Live at the Royal Festival Hall	Enja	with the United Nations Orchestra
1990	Max + Dizzy: Paris 1989	A&M	with Max Roach
1992	The Copenhagen Concert	SteepleChase	
1992	Live! at Blues Alley	Blues Alley	with Ron Holloway, Ed Cherry, John Lee, Ignacio Berroa
1992	Bird Songs: The Final Recordings	Telarc	
1992	To Bird with Love	Telarc	
1992	To Diz with Love	Telarc	

==== Compilations ====
Year	Title	Label	Notes
1947	Dizzy Gillespie and His All-Stars	Musicraft	4x10" shellac
1955	Diz and Getz	Norgran	with Stan Getz; compiles The Dizzy Gillespie Stan Getz Sextet, and More of the Dizzy Gillespie Stan Getz Sextet (Album 2)
1955	Groovin' High	Savoy	
1956	Trumpet Battle	Clef	with Roy Eldridge
1956	The Trumpet Kings	Clef	with Roy Eldridge
1976	Dee Gee Days: The Savoy Sessions (1951–1952)	Savoy	includes all tracks on The Champ (Savoy) and School Days (Regent)
1977	Diz and Roy	Verve	2xLP; with Roy Eldridge
1994	Roy and Diz	Verve	with Roy Eldridge; compiles Roy and Diz, and Roy and Diz #2
1995	Birks Works: The Verve Big Band Sessions	Verve	2xCD; compiles World Statesman, Dizzy in Greece, and Birks' Works
1995	The Complete RCA Victor Recordings (1946–1949)	Bluebird RCA	2xCD
2004	The Great Blue Star Sessions 1952–1953	EmArcy	2xCD; includes all tracks on Dizzy Gillespie and His Operatic Strings Orchestra (Fontana) and some tracks released on Dizzy at Home and Abroad (Atlantic)
2006	Dizzy Digs Paris	Giant Steps	2xCD; live and studio recordings; includes all tracks on Dizzy Over Paris (Roost)

==== Box sets ====
Year	Title	Label	Notes
2006	The Verve/Philips Dizzy Gillespie Small Group Sessions	Mosaic	7xCD

=== Appears on ===
- Modern Jazz Trumpets (Prestige, 1951, 10") credited to Fats Navarro / Dizzy Gillespie / Miles Davis / Kenny Dorham
- Hot vs. Cool: A Battle of Jazz (MGM, 1952, 10") credited to Jimmy McPartland and the Dixieland Stars / Dizzy Gillespie and the Birdland Stars
- 1941 (Minton's Playhouse & Monroe's Uptown, New York City) (Esoteric, 1953) live; credited to Dizzy Gillespie / Charley Christian; reissued by Vogue in 1957 as At Minton's
- Bird - Diz - Bud - Max (Savoy, 1953, 10")
- I/We Had a Ball (Limelight, 1965) 1 track by Dizzy's quintet, plus 3 tracks by Quincy Jones with Dizzy

=== With The Paris All Stars ===
- 1989: Homage to Charlie Parker (A&M) with Jackie McLean, Phil Woods, Stan Getz, Milt Jackson, Hank Jones, Percy Heath, Max Roach

=== As sideman ===
With Benny Carter

- New Jazz Sounds (Norgran, 1954)
- In the Mood for Swing (MusicMasters, 1988)

With Arnett Cobb

- Show Time (Fantasy, 1987)

With CTI All Stars

- Rhythmstick (CTI, 1990)

With Duke Ellington

- Jazz Party (Columbia, 1959)

With Aretha Franklin

- Who's Zoomin' Who? (Arista, 1985)

With Gil Fuller

- Gil Fuller & the Monterey Jazz Festival Orchestra featuring Dizzy Gillespie (Pacific Jazz, 1965)

With Coleman Hawkins

- Rainbow Mist (Delmark, 1944 [1992]) compilation of Apollo recordings

With Woody Herman

- Woody and Friends at Monterey Jazz Festival 1979 (Concord Jazz, 1981) with Stan Getz, Slide Hampton, Woody Shaw

With Quincy Jones

- Back on the Block (Warner Bros., 1989)

With Chaka Khan

- What Cha' Gonna Do for Me (Warner Bros., 1981)

With Moe Koffman

- Oop-Pop-A-Da (Soundwings, 1988)

With Gene Krupa and Buddy Rich

- Krupa and Rich (Clef, 1955)

With Mike Longo

- Talk with the Spirits (Pablo, 1976)

With Louie Louie

- Sittin' in the Lap of Luxury (WTG/Epic, 1990)

With Chuck Mangione

- Tarantella (A&M, 1981)

With the Manhattan Transfer

- Vocalese (Atlantic, 1985)

With Carmen McRae

- November Girl (Black Lion, 1970 [1975]) with the Kenny Clarke/Francy Boland Big Band
- At the Great American Music Hall (Blue Note, 1976)

With Charles Mingus

- Charles Mingus and Friends in Concert (Columbia, 1972)

With Katie Bell Nubin

- Soul, Soul Searching (Verve, 1960)

With Oscar Peterson

- Oscar Peterson Jam - Montreux '77 (Pablo)
- Jousts (Pablo, 1978)

With Mongo Santamaria

- Montreux Heat! (Pablo, 1980)
- Summertime (Pablo, 1980)

With Lillian Terry

- Oo-Shoo-Be-Doo-Be...Oo, Oo...Oo, Oo (Black Saint, 1985)

With Big Joe Turner

- The Trumpet Kings Meet Joe Turner (Pablo, 1975)

With Randy Weston

- Spirits of Our Ancestors (Verve, 1993)

== Compositions ==
- "Anthropology" (AKA "Thriving from a Riff")
- "Be-Bop"
- "Birks' Works"
- "Blue 'n' Boogie"
- "The Champ"
- "Con Alma"
- "Cool Breeze"
- "Cubana Be/Cubana Bop"
- "Dizzy Atmosphere"
- "Emanon"
- "Fiesta Mojo"
- "Groovin' High"
- "Guarachi Guara" (AKA "Soul Sauce")
- "He Beeped When He Shoulda Bopped"
- "In the Land of Oo-Bla-Dee"
- "Kush"
- "Lorraine"
- "Manteca"
- "A Night in Tunisia" (AKA "Interlude")
- "One Bass Hit"
- "Ool-Ya-Koo"
- "Oop Bop Sh'Bam"
- "Ow!"
- "Ray's Idea"
- "Salt Peanuts"
- "Shaw 'Nuff"
- "Swing Low, Sweet Cadillac"
- "That's Earl, Brother"
- "Things to Come"
- "Tin Tin Deo"
- "Tour De Force"
- "Two Bass Hit"
- "Woody 'n' You" (AKA "Algo Bueno")

== Filmography ==
- 1946: Jivin' In Be-Bop
- 1983: Jazz in America (Embassy)
- 1986: In Redondo Beach/Jazz in America (Embassy)
- 1991: Dizzy Gillespie: A Night in Tunisia (View)
- 1993: Live in London (Kultur)
- 1998: Dizzy Gillespie & Charles Mingus (Vidjazz)
- 1998: Dizzy Gillespie: Ages (Vidjazz)
- 1999: Jazz Casual: Dizzy Gillespie (Rhino)
- 2001: Jivin'in Be-Bop (Jazz Classic Video)
- 2001: Dizzy Gillespie: A Night in Chicago (View)
- 2001: Live at the Royal Festival Hall 1987 (Pioneer)
- 2002: Live in Montreal (Image)
- 2003: 20th Century Jazz Masters (Idem)
- 2003: Swing Era (with Mel Tormé) (Idem)
- 2005: Norman Granz Jazz in Montreux: Presents Dizzy Gillespie Sextet '77 (Eagle Vision)
- 2005: Summer Jazz Live at New Jersey 1987 (FS World Jazz/Alpha Centauri Entertainment)
- 2005: A Night in Havana: Dizzy Gillespie in Cuba (New Video Group) filmed in 1985 with Arturo Sandoval, Sayyd Abdul Al Khabyyr)
- 2006: Jazz Icons: Live in '58 & '70 (Universal)
- 2008: London Concerts 1965 & 1966 (Impro-Jazz [Spain])

== Bibliography ==
- To Be or Not to Bop. New York: Doubleday, 1979.
- To Be or Not to Bop. Minneapolis: University of Minnesota Press, 2009.
