= I'm Sitting on Top of the World =

1925 song

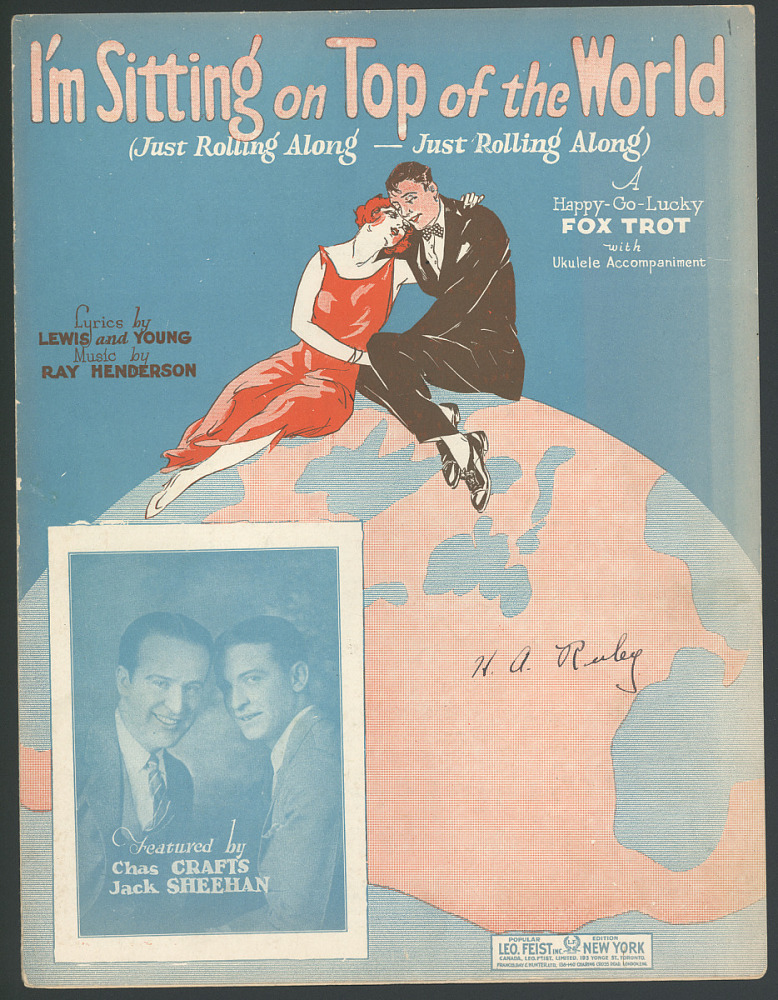
- Sheet music cover, 1925

Song
- Published: October 7, 1925 Leo Feist, Inc.
- Genre: popular
- Composer: Ray Henderson
- Lyricists: Sam M. Lewis and Joe Young

"I'm Sitting on Top of the World" is a popular song with music written by Ray Henderson and lyrics by Sam M. Lewis and Joe Young. It was published in 1925. This composition is not to be confused with, "Sitting on Top of the World" written by Walter Vinson and notably performed by Taj Mahal and Corey Harris.

The song was most likely first recorded by Art Gillham (‘the Whispering Pianist’), who recorded ‘I'm Sitting on Top of the World’ on 24 October 1925. Al Jolson's recording was made on December 21, 1925. Jolson sang it in the 1928 part-talkie film The Singing Fool and in his biographical movie The Jolson Story in 1946, where it was lip-synced by actor Larry Parks.

Popular recordings in 1926 were by Jolson, Roger Wolfe Kahn and His Hotel Biltmore Orchestra, and by Frank Crumit.

The song entered the public domain in the United States along with all other works from 1925 in 2021.

== Notable cover versions ==
Notable interpretations have been recorded by these performers:

- Les Paul and Mary Ford - reached no. 10 in the Billboard charts in 1953.
- The Four Aces with the Jack Pleis Orchestra - for the album, Mood For Love (1955)
- Jerry Lewis for his album Just Sings (1956)
- Doris Day - for the album Cuttin' Capers (1959).
- Aretha Franklin recorded the song for her album The Tender, the Moving, the Swinging Aretha Franklin (1962).
- Brenda Lee - included in her album Brenda, That's All (1962)
- Dean Martin - for his album Sittin' on Top of the World (1973)
- Dizzy Gillespie - for his Digital at Montreux, 1980 (1980)
- Bobby Darin (unreleased) - included in his album Great Gentlemen Of Song:Spotlight on Bobby Darin (1995)
- Frank Sinatra

== Appearances of the song ==
Jolson's recording (1925) was played:

- As part of the soundtrack of Woody Allen's film Zelig (1983).
- In the closing sequence of Richard Loncraine's film Richard III (1995).
- In the beginning of the sixth episode of Monarch: Legacy of Monsters

Jolson’s recording (1947) was played:

- During the opening montage of 1930s New York City in the 2005 remake of King Kong.

== Legacy ==
- Additionally, the song "I'm On My Way" by The Proclaimers makes reference to the song, saying "I'd have Al Jolson sing 'I'm sittin' on top of the world'."
