= Ronnie Blye =

American football player (born 1943)

No. 22, 33
- Position: Running back

Personal information
- Born: December 29, 1941; Clearwater, Florida, U.S.
- Died: December 28, 2016 (aged 74); Shoreline, Washington, U.S.
- Listed height: 6 ft 1 in (1.85 m)
- Listed weight: 202 lb (92 kg)

Career information
- High school: Pinellas (Clearwater, FL); Samuel J. Tilden (Brooklyn, NY)
- College: Notre Dame (1962-1963); Florida A&M (1964-1965)

Career history
- 1966: Jersey Jets
- 1967: Westchester Bulls
- 1968: New York Giants
- 1969: Philadelphia Eagles
- 1970: Long Island Bulls
- 1971: Jersey Jays
- Stats at Pro Football Reference

Ronald Jerry Blye (December 29, 1941 – December 28, 2016) was an American football running back in the National Football League (NFL) for the New York Giants and the Philadelphia Eagles. He played college football at the University of Notre Dame.

== Early life ==
Blye was born on December 29, 1941, in Clearwater, Florida. Blye attended Pinellas High School in Clearwater, Florida and Samuel J. Tilden High School in Brooklyn, New York.

== College career ==
Blye played football at University of Notre Dame from 1962 to 1963 on scholarship. He later attended Florida A&M University from 1964 to 1965.

== Professional career ==
Blye played in the NFL for the New York Giants in 1968 and the Philadelphia Eagles in 1969. Playing at the running back position, Blye appeared in 27 games during his NFL career from 1968 to 1969. He scored the only touchdown of his career as a member of the Giants, in a 48–21 win over the Washington Redskins on September 29, 1968, at Yankee Stadium.

Besides his time spent in the NFL, Blye spent several years playing in the Atlantic Coast Football League. He played for the Jersey Jets, Westchester Bulls, Long Island Bulls, and Jersey Jays.

== Death ==
Blye died on December 28, 2016, in Shoreline, Washington.
