= It's My Way =

It's My Way may refer to:

- It's My Way (Dizzy Gillespie album)
- It's My Way!, 1964 album by Buffy Sainte-Marie
