= Groovin' High (disambiguation) =

"Groovin' High" is a 1945 jazz standard by Dizzy Gilespie.

Groovin' High may also refer to:

- Groovin' High (Dizzy Gillespie album), 1955
- Groovin' High (Booker Ervin album), 1966
- Groovin' High (Hank Jones album), 1978
- Groovin' High (Kenny Burrell album), 1981
