= New Faces (album) =

Studio album by Dizzy Gillespie
- Released: 1985
- Recorded: 1984–85
- Genre: Jazz
- Length: 42:40
- Label: GRP; A-1012
- Producer: Dave Grusin and Larry Rosen

Dizzy Gillespie chronology
Closer to the Source (1984)	New Faces (1985)	Dizzy Gillespie Meets Phil Woods Quintet (1986)

New Faces is an album by trumpeter Dizzy Gillespie recorded in 1984–85 and released on the GRP label.

== Reception ==
Scott Yanow of Allmusic called the album a "decent effort".

Professional ratings
Review scores
Source	Rating
Allmusic	3/5 stars

== Track listing ==
All compositions by Dizzy Gillespie except as indicated

1. "Birk's Works" - 6:26
2. "Lorraine" - 7:40
3. "Tin Tin Deo" (Gil Fuller, Gillespie, Chano Pozo) - 6:30
4. "Tenor Song" - 4:01
5. "Ballad" - 7:18
6. "Fiesta Mojo" - 6:15
7. "Every Mornin'" (Mike Longo) - 4:30

== Personnel ==
- Dizzy Gillespie - trumpet
- Branford Marsalis - tenor saxophone, soprano saxophone
- Kenny Kirkland - piano
- Lonnie Plaxico - bass (tracks 1–6)
- Lincoln Goines - bass (track 7)
- Robby Ameen - drums
- Steve Thornton - percussion (tracks 3 & 6)
