= Oop-Pop-A-Da =

Studio album by Moe Koffman Quintet featuring Dizzy Gillespie
- Released: 1988
- Recorded: 1988
- Genre: Jazz
- Length: 61:27
- Label: Soundwing; SW 2108

Dizzy Gillespie chronology
Endlessly (1988)	Oop-Pop-A-Da (1988)	Live at the Royal Festival Hall (1989)

Oop-Pop-A-Da is an album by the Moe Koffman Quintet featuring trumpeter Dizzy Gillespie recorded in 1988 and released on the Soundwing label.

== Reception ==
The Allmusic review stated "Diz's trumpet playing was clearly past its prime by 1988, but his scat singing on 'Oop-Pop-A-Da' is quite virtuosic and outstanding, easily the high point of this little-known set".

Professional ratings
Review scores
Source	Rating
Allmusic	4/5 stars

== Track listing ==
All compositions by Dizzy Gillespie except as indicated

1. "Oop-Pop-A-Da" (Babs Gonzales) – 10:15
2. "Lush Life" (Billy Strayhorn) – 5:13
3. "Fried Banana" (Moe Koffman) – 4:40
4. "Elie's Dream" (Koffman) – 4:54
5. "No Siesta Ees Fiesta" (Koffman) – 4:32
6. "A Night in Tunisia" (Gillespie, Felix Paparelli) – 11:08
7. "Fun" (Bernie Senensky) – 6:03
8. "Groovin' High" – 8:20
9. "Jade Eyes" (Senesky) – 6:22

== Personnel ==
- Dizzy Gillespie – trumpet, vocals
- Moe Koffman – alto saxophone, soprano saxophone, flute
- Ed Bickert – guitar
- Bernie Senensky – keyboards
- Kieran Overs – bass
- Barry Elmes – drums
