= Dizzy Gillespie Meets Phil Woods Quintet =

Studio album by Dizzy Gillespie and Phil Woods
- Released: 1987
- Recorded: December 14, 1986
- Studio: Studio 44, Monster, South Holland
- Genre: Jazz
- Length: 41:59
- Label: Timeless; SJP 250
- Producer: Bill Goodwin and Peter Huijts

Dizzy Gillespie chronology
New Faces (1985)	Dizzy Gillespie Meets Phil Woods Quintet (1987)	Endlessly (1988)

Dizzy Gillespie Meets Phil Woods Quintet is an album by trumpeter Dizzy Gillespie with saxophonist Phil Woods Quintet recorded in 1986 and released on the Dutch Timeless label.

== Reception ==
The Allmusic review stated "This European studio session features Dizzy as a special guest sitting in with one of Woods' greatest quintets, with pianist Hal Galper and the brilliant trumpeter and flugelhornist Tom Harrell. In fact Dizzy's chops had already slipped somewhat during the decade and Harrell clearly outplays him even though he clearly isn't trying to embarrass the legendary trumpeter".

Professional ratings
Review scores
Source	Rating
Allmusic	4/5 stars

== Track listing ==
All compositions by Dizzy Gillespie except as indicated

1. "Oon-Ga-Wa" - 6:21
2. "Loose Change" (Hal Galper) - 8:06
3. "Whasdishean" - 6:01
4. "'Round Midnight" (Thelonious Monk) - 12:42
5. "Love for Sale" (Cole Porter) - 8:49

== Personnel ==
- Dizzy Gillespie - trumpet
- Phil Woods - alto saxophone
- Hal Galper - piano
- Steve Gilmore - bass
- Bill Goodwin - drums
- Tom Harrell - trumpet, flugelhorn
