= The Giants of Jazz (album) =

1972 live album by a set of jazz all-stars

Live album by Art Blakey, Dizzy Gillespie, Al McKibbon, Thelonious Monk, Sonny Stitt and Kai Winding
- Released: 1972
- Recorded: November 14, 1971
- Venue: Victoria Theatre, London
- Genre: Jazz
- Length: 90:32
- Label: Atlantic
- Producer: George Wein

Dizzy Gillespie chronology
Dizzy Gillespie and the Mitchell Ruff Duo in Concert (1971)	The Giants of Jazz (1972)	The Giant (1972)

Art Blakey chronology
Jazz Messengers '70 (1970)	The Giants of Jazz (1971)	Child's Dance (1972)

The Giants of Jazz is a live album of an English concert recorded at Victoria Theatre in London in two concerts on the same date, November 14, 1971, by Art Blakey, Dizzy Gillespie, Al McKibbon, Thelonious Monk, Sonny Stitt, and Kai Winding, who were billed as The Giants of Jazz. The album was released by the Atlantic.

== Reception ==
The Allmusic review called the album "A historic and superlative set".

Professional ratings
Review scores
Source	Rating
Allmusic	4.5/5 stars

== Track listing ==
1. "Tin Tin Deo" (Gil Fuller, Chano Pozo) – 11:42
2. "Night in Tunisia" (Dizzy Gillespie, Felix Paparelli) – 10:22
3. "Woody 'n' You" (Gillespie) – 8:34
4. "Tour de Force" (Gillespie) – 13:22
5. "Allen's Alley (Be Bop Tune)" (Denzil Best) – 8:38
6. "Blue 'n' Boogie" (Gillespie, Frank Paparelli) – 13:50
7. "Everything Happens to Me" (Tom Adair, Matt Dennis) – 4:52
8. Dizzy's Rap – 1:09
9. "Blue Monk" (Thelonious Monk) – 9:44
10. "'Round Midnight" (Monk) – 8:19

== Personnel ==
- Dizzy Gillespie – trumpet
- Kai Winding – trombone
- Sonny Stitt – saxophone
- Al McKibbon – double bass
- Thelonious Monk – piano
- Art Blakey – drums
