= Dwike Mitchell =

- Born: Ivory Mitchell Jr. February 14, 1930; Dunedin, Florida, United States
- Died: April 7, 2013 (aged 83) Jacksonville, Florida, United States
- Genres: Jazz
- Occupation: Jazz musician
- Instrument: Piano
- Years active: 1954–2011
- Label: Epic

Dwike Mitchell (born Ivory Mitchell Jr.; February 14, 1930 – April 7, 2013) was an American piano player and teacher. He began his career as pianist for the Lionel Hampton Orchestra before joining Willie Ruff to form The Mitchell-Ruff Duo jazz group.

== Early life ==
Mitchell was born and raised in Dunedin, Florida. He began playing piano around the age of three after his father, who had a job driving a garbage truck, brought home an old piano discarded by its owner. With the help of his mother, who made him play exercises and scales, and a cousin, who had been taking piano lessons herself, Mitchell soon displayed an exceptional aptitude for the instrument. He began performing in public at the age of five. His mother, a soloist in her church choir, needed an accompanist and gave the job to her young son. Before long he was playing for the entire Sunday morning service, a role he would continue to perform through the age of seventeen. He attended Pinellas High School.

In the spring of 1946, Mitchell enlisted in the armed services and eventually was stationed at Lockbourne Air Force Base. Lockbourne, at that time an all-black facility, was renowned for its excellent music program, and in particular its concert band and legendary bandmaster John Brice. This proved to be a major step in Mitchell's musical education. Assigned to the band, he met an older musician, Sergeant Proctor, who suggested that Mitchell "learn the Grieg A Minor Concerto and play it with the concert band." Still a slow reader of music, Mitchell had never before seen a concerto score. But with the help of another pianist at the base, Captain Alvin Downing, he eventually mastered the Grieg score and played the work with the concert band.

It was also at Lockbourne that Mitchell was introduced to the music of Rachmaninoff, whose compositions would influence Mitchell as he developed his own jazz piano style. A pilot who went by the nickname "Flaps" had recordings of virtually every work Rachmaninoff had written. Mitchell later told a writer that, after hearing the first of those recordings, he "began to cry. . . . The chords . . . go through incredible progressions, and they're also very jazz-oriented."

Following his discharge from the Army, Mitchell enrolled in the Philadelphia Musical Academy, where he studied with Hungarian-born pianist Agi Jambor. Under her tutelage, Mitchell learned the Khachaturian Piano Concerto and performed it with the academy's orchestra.

== Professional career ==
After graduating from the academy, Mitchell joined the orchestra of the jazz musician Lionel Hampton. Hampton had heard Mitchell play at Lockbourne five years earlier and told him at the time that he wanted him as his pianist. Mitchell had abandoned his given name, Ivory, because of its popular association with piano keys. His new professional name, Dwike, was his mother's suggestion, based on several family names.

In 1954 Mitchell was reunited with French horn player Willie Ruff, whom Mitchell had befriended when both were stationed at Lockbourne. Ruff had just received a master's degree in music from Yale and was considering offers from two symphony orchestras. On television, he had seen Lionel Hampton's orchestra perform on The Ed Sullivan Show and recognized Mitchell when the camera panned to the pianist. Ruff immediately phoned the television station, and in the ensuing conversation Mitchell convinced Ruff to abandon his symphony plans and instead join the Hampton orchestra.

In 1955 the two men left the orchestra to form the Mitchell-Ruff jazz duo. The duo placed an emphasis on introducing American jazz music in parts of the world unfamiliar with the idiom. Among these, were visits to the Soviet Union in 1959 and to China in 1981. On the former trip they made a pretext of performing with the Yale Russian Chorus, jazz being prohibited at the time by the Soviet government. In fact, they held two jazz concerts at the Tchaikovsky Conservatory. In appreciation for the duo's performances, Mitchell and Ruff were invited to attend the Bolshoi Theater to see the final performance of the Russian ballerina Galina Ulanova. The 1981 trip to China marked the first time Americans had played and conducted workshops on jazz in that country after the Cultural Revolution.

== Later years ==
Throughout his time with the duo, Mitchell maintained a residence in New York City and a parallel career teaching piano there. He remained in touch with his childhood hometown of Dunedin, giving concerts at both the University of South Florida and Dunedin High School. He also went back in 1983 to spend time with his dying father. In 2012, after becoming ill, he returned to his native South, spending his last months in Jacksonville, Florida. He died on April 7, 2013, of pancreatic disease.

== Discography ==
=== With the Mitchell-Ruff Duo ===
- Campus Concert (Epic Records) 1956
- Appearing Nightly (Roulette Records, R-52002) 1957
- The Mitchell-Ruff Duo plus Strings & Brass (Roulette) 1958
- Jazz for Juniors (Roulette) 1958-1959
- Jazz Mission to Moscow (Roulette) 1959
- The Sound of Music by Rodgers and Hammerstein (Roulette) 1960
- Mitchell and Ruff: Brazilian Trip (Epic Records) 1960
- Strayhorn: A Mitchell-Ruff Interpretation (Mainstream; 50th anniversary reissue, Kepler Label, CD MR-2421) 1969
- Dizzy Gillespie and the Mitchell Ruff Duo in Concert (Mainstream) 1971
- Dizzy Gillespie and the Mitchell-Ruff Duo: Enduring Magic (Blackhawk Records) 1970-1980
- Virtuoso Elegance in Jazz (Kepler Label, M-R 1234) 1983
- Breaking the Silence (Kepler Label, 2380, 2000)

=== With the Mitchell-Ruff Trio ===
- The Catbird Seat (Atlantic Records) 1961
- After This Message (Atlantic) 1965

=== As sideman ===
With Lionel Hampton Orchestra

- Lionel Hampton in Vienna Vol. 2 (RST, 1503658, 1954)
