= Talk with the Spirits =

Studio album by Mike Longo
- Released: 1976
- Recorded: January 16, 1976
- Studio: RCA Studios, New York City, NY
- Genre: Jazz
- Length: 33:57
- Label: Pablo; 2310 769
- Producer: Dizzy Gillespie

Mike Longo chronology
900 Shares of the Blues (1974)	Talk with the Spirits (1976)	New York '78 (1978)

Talk with the Spirits is an album by pianist/composer Mike Longo recorded in 1976 and released by the Pablo label.

== Reception ==
Professional ratings
Review scores
Source	Rating
AllMusic	4/5 stars

AllMusic reviewer Scott Yanow stated "Longo gathered together an impressive sextet ... The music, five of Longo's originals, is less memorable than the solos, but this remains a fine effort that ranges from lightly funky to straight-ahead".

== Track listing ==
All compositions by Mike Longo

1. "Wyyowa" – 7:50
2. "Roma" – 6:20
3. "The Proclamation" – 7:10
4. "Angel of Love" – 9:18
5. "Talk with the Spirits" – 13:19

== Personnel ==
- Virgil Jones – trumpet
- Harold Vick – tenor saxophone
- George Davis – guitar
- Mike Longo – piano
- Bob Cranshaw – bass
- Mickey Roker – drums
- Dizzy Gillespie – conga drums, vocals
