= Endlessly (Dizzy Gillespie album) =

Studio album by Dizzy Gillespie
- Released: 1988
- Genres: Jazz, pop
- Label: Impulse!
- Producer: T. Brooks Shepard

Dizzy Gillespie chronology
Dizzy Gillespie Meets Phil Woods Quintet (1987)	Endlessly (1988)	Oop-Pop-A-Da (1988)

Endlessly is an album by the American trumpeter Dizzy Gillespie, released in 1988. Gillespie supported the album with a North American tour. Endlessly peaked in the top ten of Billboard's Jazz Albums chart.

== Production ==
The album was produced by T. Brooks Shepard. David Peaston sang on the cover of Kris Kristofferson's "For the Good Times". "There You Are" is a cover of the Clyde Otis song. "Just Tippin' In" was written by Horace Ott. "Goodbye, El Barrio" is a version of a song that appeared on the soundtrack to Crossover Dreams. Arthur Blythe played saxophone on the Marvin Gaye medley.

== Critical reception ==
Professional ratings
Review scores
Source	Rating
AllMusic	1/5 stars
Los Angeles Times	3.5/5 stars
Orlando Sentinel	3/5 stars

The Washington Post considered the album "for light pop and diehard Dizzy fans only," writing that "the mood is more sentimental than moving." The Los Angeles Times wrote that Gillespie "plays exceptionally well." The Orlando Sentinel deemed Endlessly "an understated, comfortable, pop-oriented album," stating that "Gillespie's music is sweet enough these days without the extra serving of synthesized syrup." The San Diego Union-Tribune opined that "Gillespie especially has a strong feel for Latin idioms, and his playing is not only respectful of other musical traditions, it is highly complementary." The Ottawa Citizen said that "the music is formula pop, the production is studio sterile and the playing is both uninspired and tentative."

== Track listing ==
No.	Title	Length
1.	"Just Tippin' In"
2.	"Moments Aren't Moments"
3.	"Endlessly"
4.	"For the Good Times"
5.	"I Should Care"
6.	"Goodbye, El Barrio"
7.	"Flyin' High in the Friendly Sky/Save the Children"
8.	"There You Are"
