= Dizzy Gillespie and the Mitchell Ruff Duo in Concert =

Live album by Dizzy Gillespie and the Mitchell-Ruff Duo
- Released: 1971
- Recorded: April 21, 1971; Dartmouth College, New Hampshire
- Genre: Jazz
- Length: 35:43
- Label: Mainstream; MRL 325
- Producer: Willie Ruff

Dizzy Gillespie chronology
Giants (1971)	Dizzy Gillespie and the Mitchell Ruff Duo in Concert (1971)	The Giants of Jazz (1971)

Dizzy Gillespie and the Mitchell Ruff Duo in Concert is a live album by trumpeter Dizzy Gillespie and the Mitchell-Ruff Duo recorded at Dartmouth College in 1971 and released on the Mainstream label.

== Reception ==
The Allmusic review states "This is one of Gillespie's stronger sets of the '70s".

Professional ratings
Review scores
Source	Rating
Allmusic	4/5 stars
The Rolling Stone Jazz Record Guide	3/5 stars

== Track listing ==
All compositions by Dizzy Gillespie except as indicated

1. "Con Alma" - 8:54
2. "Dartmouth Duet" (Gillespie, Willie Ruff) - 3:17
3. "Woody 'n' You" - 4:53
4. "Blues People" (Gillespie, Dwike Mitchell, Ruff) - 11:17
5. "Bella Bella" (Ruff) - 7:22

== Personnel ==
- Dizzy Gillespie - trumpet
- Dwike Mitchell - piano
- Willie Ruff - bass, French horn
