= To Bird with Love =

Live album by Dizzy Gillespie
- Released: 1992
- Recorded: January 23–25, 1992
- Venue: Blue Note Jazz Club, Greenwich Village, New York City
- Genre: Jazz
- Length: 63:20
- Label: Telarc; CD-83316

Dizzy Gillespie chronology
| Bird Songs: The Final Recordings (1992) | To Bird with Love (1992) | To Diz with Love (1992) |

To Bird with Love is a live album by trumpeter Dizzy Gillespie with an array of guest stars. It was recorded at the Blue Note Jazz Club in New York City on January 23–25, 1992 and released on the Telarc label. Gillespie's performances at the club in January and February of that year yielded two additional live albums, Bird Songs: The Final Recordings and To Diz with Love. Together, these three titles represent his final recordings prior to his death in 1993.

== Reception ==
The Allmusic review stated "The good spirits and obvious love that these musicians had for Gillespie make up for his technical lapses".

Professional ratings
Review scores
| Source | Rating |
|---|---|
| Allmusic | 3/5 stars |
| The Penguin Guide to Jazz Recordings | 2.5/4 stars |

== Track listing ==
1. "Billie's Bounce" (Charlie Parker) – 15:21
2. "Bebop" (Gillespie) – 11:44
3. "Ornithology" (Benny Harris, Parker) – 10:40
4. "Anthropology" (Gillespie, Parker) – 10:56
5. "Oop-Pop-A-Da" (Babs Gonzales) – 11:21
6. "The Diamond Jubilee Blues" (Gillespie) – 1:53
7. "The Theme" (Miles Davis) – 1:25

== Personnel ==
- Dizzy Gillespie – trumpet
- Antonio Hart (tracks 2–4), Paquito D'Rivera (tracks 5–7), Jackie McLean (tracks 5–7) – alto saxophone
- Benny Golson (track 1), Clifford Jordan (tracks 2–4), David Sánchez (track 1) – tenor saxophone
- Danilo Pérez – piano
- George Mraz – bass
- Kenny Washington (tracks 1 & 5–7), Lewis Nash (tracks 2–7) – drums
- Bobby McFerrin – vocals (tracks 5–7)
