= The Giants of Jazz =

American jazz supergroup

The Giants of Jazz was a jazz all-star group of the early 1970s which featured Art Blakey (drums), Dizzy Gillespie (trumpet), Al McKibbon (bass), Thelonious Monk (piano), Sonny Stitt (alto and tenor sax), and Kai Winding (trombone). They recorded albums for Atlantic Records, Concord Records. and Emarcy Records. The group toured internationally in 1971-1972. Their 1971 concert tour stops in the cities of Prague and Copenhagen were both filmed, and were subsequently released on separate DVDs in the 2000s.

== Discography ==
- The Giants of Jazz (Atlantic, 1971)
- The Giants of Jazz: Live in Prague 1971 (recorded at the Mezinárodní Jazz Festival on October 30, 1971; Impro-Jazz, 2006 DVD)
- Giants of Jazz: Copenhagen 1971 (Standing Ovation, 2009 DVD)
