= Live at the Village Vanguard (Dizzy Gillespie album) =

Live album by Dizzy Gillespie
- Released: 1967
- Recorded: October 1, 1967
- Venues: Village Vanguard, NYC
- Genre: Jazz
- Length: 33:25; 104:45 (reissue)
- Labels: Solid State; Blue Note (reissue)
- Producer: Sonny Lester

Dizzy Gillespie chronology
Swing Low, Sweet Cadillac (1967)	Live at the Village Vanguard (1967)	The Dizzy Gillespie Reunion Big Band (1968)

Live at the Village Vanguard is a live album by American jazz trumpeter Dizzy Gillespie recorded on October 1, 1967, at the Village Vanguard and released on Solid State later that year. The complete recordings were released by Blue Note in 1992 under the same title.

== Release history ==
The unused recordings from the concert were originally released in edited form by Solid State on two compilations entitled Jazz for a Sunday Afternoon Volume 1 and Jazz for a Sunday Afternoon Volume 2. The recordings were subsequently re-released in unedited form as a 2-CD set on the Blue Note label in 1992.

== Reception ==
The AllMusic review stated "These lengthy performances (all but one of the seven songs are over 11 minutes) contain some loose and rambling moments but also plenty of creative playing by this unusual group of all-stars".

Professional ratings
Review scores
Source	Rating
AllMusic	4/5 stars
The Penguin Guide to Jazz Recordings	3/4 stars

== Track listing ==
=== Original release ===
All music is composed by Dizzy Gillespie, except as noted.

Side A
No.	Title	Writer(s)	Length
1.	"Dizzy's Blues" (AKA Birk's Works)	Ahmad Salim	14:30

All music is composed by Dizzy Gillespie, except as noted.

Side B
No.	Title	Length
1.	"Blues For Max"	9:10
2.	"Tour de force"	9:45
Total length:		33:25

=== Blue Note reissue ===
Disc one
No.	Title	Writer(s)	Length
1.	"Dizzy's Blues" (AKA Birk's Works)		17:57
2.	"Lullaby of the Leaves"	Bernice Petkere, Joe Young	13:30
3.	"Lover, Come Back to Me"	Oscar Hammerstein II, Sigmund Romberg	19:15
4.	"Blues for Max"		9:10

Disc two
No.	Title	Writer(s)	Length
1.	"Tour de force"		11:51
2.	"On the Trail"	Ferde Grofe	16:43
3.	"Sweet Georgia Brown"	Ben Bernie, Maceo Pinkard, Kenneth Casey	16:19

- Tracks 1-2–1-4 released on Jazz for a Sunday Afternoon Volume 1 in edited form
- Tracks 2-1–2-3 released on Jazz for a Sunday Afternoon Volume 2 in edited form

== Personnel ==
- Dizzy Gillespie – trumpet
- Pepper Adams – baritone saxophone
- Garnett Brown – trombone (disc two)
- Ray Nance – violin (disc one)
- Chick Corea – piano
- Richard Davis – bass
- Elvin Jones (tracks 1-1, 1-2), Mel Lewis (tracks 1-3–2-3) – drums
