= To a Finland Station =

Studio album by Dizzy Gillespie and Arturo Sandoval
- Released: 1983
- Recorded: September 9, 1982; Helsinki, Finland
- Genre: Jazz
- Length: 44:32
- Labels: Pablo; 2310-889
- Producer: Dizzy Gillespie

Dizzy Gillespie chronology
Musician, Composer, Raconteur (1981)	To a Finland Station (1983)	Closer to the Source (1984)

To a Finland Station is an album by trumpeters Dizzy Gillespie and Arturo Sandoval recorded in 1982 and released on the Pablo label. Gillespie visited Finland in 1982 to do a concert with the Finnish Studio Orchestra. By coincidence a Cuban group, led by Sandoval, was also appearing in Helsinki at the time. The two musicians got together and recorded this album in a single all-night session that extended into the following morning.

== Reception ==
The Allmusic review stated "this recording is of great historic value".

Professional ratings
Review scores
Source	Rating
Allmusic	4/5 stars
The Rolling Stone Jazz Record Guide	3/5 stars

== Track listing ==
All compositions by Dizzy Gillespie

1. "Wheatleigh Hall" - 8:12
2. "First Chance" - 6:12
3. "And Then She Stopped" - 9:17
4. "Rimsky" - 8:44
5. "Dizzy the Duck" - 12:07

== Personnel ==
- Dizzy Gillespie - trumpet, Jew's harp
- Arturo Sandoval - trumpet
- Esko Linnavalli - piano
- Pekka Sarmanto - bass
- Esko Rosnell - drums
