= The Melody Lingers On (Dizzy Gillespie album) =

Studio album by Dizzy Gillespie
- Released: 1967
- Recorded: October 1966
- Genre: Jazz
- Length: 39:00
- Label: Limelight; LM 82042 / LS 86042
- Producer: Hal Mooney

Dizzy Gillespie chronology
Gil Fuller & the Monterey Jazz Festival Orchestra featuring Dizzy Gillespie (1965)	The Melody Lingers On (1967)	Swing Low, Sweet Cadillac (1967)

Professional ratings
Review scores
Source	Rating
Allmusic	3/5 stars

The Melody Lingers On is an album by trumpeter Dizzy Gillespie recorded in 1966 and released on the Limelight label.

== Track listing ==
1. "Winchester Cathedral" (Geoff Stephens) - 2:21
2. "Cherry, Cherry" (Neil Diamond) - 3:46
3. "Summer Samba (Samba de Verão)" (Norman Gimbel, Marcos Valle) - 3:24
4. "Cherish" (Terry Kirkman) - 2:41
5. "Bang! Bang!" (Joe Cuba, Jimmy Sabater) - 3:04
6. "Mas que Nada" (Jorge Ben) - 4:58
7. "Tequila" (Chuck Rio) - 3:15
8. "The Song Is Ended (but the Melody Lingers On)" (Irving Berlin) - 2:27
9. "Portuguese Washerwoman (Les Lavandieres du Portugal)" (André Popp, Roger Antoine Lucchesi) - 2:47
10. "Winter Samba" (Dizzy Gillespie) - 3:11
11. "Get That Money Blues" (Jimmy Owens) - 7:06

== Personnel ==
- Dizzy Gillespie - trumpet
- James Moody - tenor saxophone, flute
- Billy Butler - guitar
- Kenny Barron - piano
- Frank Schifano - bass, vocals
- Otis "Candy" Finch, Jr. - drums
- Candido Camero - congas
- Panama Francis - percussion
