= The Source (Dizzy Gillespie album) =

Live album by Dizzy Gillespie
- Released: 1973
- Recorded: April 13, 1973; Paris, France
- Genre: Jazz
- Length: 36:13
- Label: America; AM 6135

Dizzy Gillespie chronology
The Giant (1973)	The Source (1973)	Dizzy Gillespie's Big 4 (1974)

The Source is a live album by trumpeter Dizzy Gillespie recorded in Paris, France, in 1973 and first released on the French America label.

== Reception ==
The Allmusic review stated: "This CD finds trumpeter Dizzy Gillespie at age 55, just beginning to slip. Gillespie plays well enough... Still, the edge is missing on these explorations of standards and recent originals".

Professional ratings
Review scores
Source	Rating
Allmusic	3/5 stars
The Rolling Stone Jazz Record Guide	3/5 stars

== Track listing ==
1. "Manteca" (Gil Fuller, Dizzy Gillespie, Chano Pozo) - 13:30
2. "Alone Together" (Howard Dietz, Arthur Schwartz) - 5:26
3. "Brother "K"" (Gillespie) - 9:27
4. "Wheatleigh Hall" (Gillespie) - 7:50

== Personnel ==
- Dizzy Gillespie - trumpet
- Johnny Griffin - tenor saxophone (tracks 1 & 4)
- Kenny Drew - piano
- Niels-Henning Ørsted Pedersen - bass
- Kenny Clarke - drums
- Humberto Canto - conga drums
