= Portrait of Jenny =

Studio album by Dizzy Gillespie
- Released: 1970
- Recorded: 1970
- Studio: Van Gelder, Englewood Cliffs, NJ
- Genre: Jazz
- Length: 34:56
- Label: Perception; PLP 13
- Producer: Dizzy Gillespie, Boo Frazier

Dizzy Gillespie chronology
The Real Thing (1970)	Portrait of Jenny (1970)	Giants (1971)

Portrait of Jenny is an album by American jazz trumpeter Dizzy Gillespie featuring performances recorded in 1970 and originally released on the Perception label.

== Reception ==
The AllMusic review called it a "little-known but beautifully-played combo session from the 70s".

Professional ratings
Review scores
Source	Rating
AllMusic	3/5 stars

== Track listing ==
All compositions by Dizzy Gillespie

1. "Olinga" - 7:51
2. "Diddy Wa Diddy (Mozambique)" - 10:26
3. "Me 'n Them" - 12:20
4. "Timet (Mozambique)" - 4:19

== Personnel ==
- Dizzy Gillespie - trumpet
- George Davis - guitar
- Mike Longo - piano
- Andy González - bass
- Jerry González, Carlos "Patato" Valdés - congas
- Nicky Marrero - timbales
