= Swing Low, Sweet Cadillac =

Live album by Dizzy Gillespie
- Released: 1967
- Recorded: May 25 & 26, 1967
- Genre: Jazz
- Length: 33:07
- Label: Impulse!
- Producer: Bob Thiele

Dizzy Gillespie chronology
The Melody Lingers On (1966)	Swing Low, Sweet Cadillac (1967)	Live at the Village Vanguard (1967)

Swing Low, Sweet Cadillac is a live album by American jazz trumpeter Dizzy Gillespie featuring performances recorded in 1967 for the Impulse! label.

== Reception ==
The Allmusic review by Michael G. Nastos awarded the album 3 stars stating "A strangely popular album for Dizzy Gillespie, Swing Low, Sweet Cadillac represents a period in his career where he was adapting to the times, keeping his goof factor on board, and individually playing as well as he ever had... This is not an essential listing in the vast discography of such a great jazz artist, but remains a curiosity in his collection, especially considering the two-day time frame where much more music could have been considered to be issued. It is not to be completely ignored, but less worthy than many of his other seminal groundbreaking recordings".

Professional ratings
Review scores
Source	Rating
Allmusic	3/5 stars
The Penguin Guide to Jazz Recordings	3/4 stars

== Track listing ==
All compositions by Dizzy Gillespie except as indicated

1. "Swing Low, Sweet Cadillac" – 7:17
2. "Mas que Nada" (Jorge Ben) – 6:15
3. "Bye" – 1:15
4. "Something in Your Smile" (Leslie Bricusse) – 2:40
5. "Kush" – 15:50

- Recorded at Memory Lane in Los Angeles, California on May 25 & 26, 1967

== Personnel ==
- Dizzy Gillespie – trumpet, vocals
- James Moody – tenor saxophone, alto saxophone, flute, vocals
- Mike Longo – piano
- Frank Schifano – bass
- Otis Candy Finch Jr. – drums
