= Musician-Composer-Raconteur =

Live album by Dizzy Gillespie
- Released: 1982
- Recorded: July 17, 1981
- Venue: Montreux Jazz Festival, Montreux, Switzerland
- Genre: Jazz
- Length: 90:32
- Label: Pablo Live; 2620-116
- Producer: Dizzy Gillespie

Dizzy Gillespie chronology
| Digital at Montreux, 1980 (1980) | Musician-Composer-Raconteur (1982) | To a Finland Station (1982) |

Original LP Cover

Musician-Composer-Raconteur is a live double album by trumpeter Dizzy Gillespie recorded at the Montreux Jazz Festival in 1981 and released on the Pablo label.

== Reception ==
The AllMusic review stated "This double album is subtitled "Dizzy Gillespie Plays and Raps in His Greatest Concert," an exaggeration to say the least. In reality, this set (which contains some of his humorous joking with the audience) is a fine all-around example of Gillespie at a typical concert in 1981. At the age of 63, he was no longer the powerful trumpeter he once was, but he still had something to contribute".

Professional ratings
Review scores
| Source | Rating |
|---|---|
| Allmusic | 2/5 stars |
| The Rolling Stone Jazz Record Guide | 2/5 stars |
| The Penguin Guide to Jazz Recordings | 3/4 stars |

== Track listing ==
All compositions by Dizzy Gillespie except as indicated

Disc One:

1. Introduction of the band by Claude Nobs – 1:23
2. "Manteca" (Gil Fuller, Gillespie, Chano Pozo) – 7:55
3. Dizzy Rapping with the Audience – 2:30
4. "Con Alma" – 15:07
5. Introduction of Milt Jackson by Dizzy – 1:49
6. "SKJ" (Milt Jackson) – 6:07
7. Dizzy Rapping with the Audience – 0:52
8. "A Night in Tunisia" (Gillespie, Felix Paparelli) – 17:22

Disc Two:

1. Introduction of the band by Dizzy – 1:33
2. "Brother King" – 9:09
3. "Body and Soul" (Frank Eyton, Johnny Green, Edward Heyman, Robert Sour) – 7:26
4. "Tanga" – 3:06
5. "Olinga" – 16:13

== Personnel ==
- Dizzy Gillespie – trumpet, vocals
- James Moody – tenor saxophone, alto saxophone, flute
- Milt Jackson – vibraphone
- Ed Cherry – guitar
- Michael Howell – bass
- George Hughes – drums
