= Digital at Montreux, 1980 =

Live album by Dizzy Gillespie
- Released: 1981
- Recorded: July 19, 1980
- Venue: Montreux Jazz Festival, Montreux, Switzerland
- Genre: Jazz
- Length: 41:03
- Label: Pablo Live; 2308-226
- Producer: Dizzy Gillespie

Dizzy Gillespie chronology
The Alternate Blues (1977)	Digital at Montreux, 1980 (1981)	Musician, Composer, Raconteur (1981)

Original LP Cover

Digital at Montreux, 1980 is a live album by trumpeter Dizzy Gillespie with Toots Thielemans and Bernard Purdie recorded at the Montreux Jazz Festival in 1980 and released on the Pablo label.

== Reception ==
The Allmusic review stated "Purdie, a consummate funk and R&B percussionist, makes the switch to mainstream material adequately, while Gillespie and Thielemans establish a quick, consistent rapport".

Professional ratings
Review scores
Source	Rating
Allmusic	3/5 stars
The Penguin Guide to Jazz Recordings	2.5/4 stars

== Track listing ==
1. Introduction by Claude Nobs – 0:51
2. "Christopher Columbus" (Chu Berry, Andy Razaf) – 9:30
3. "I'm Sitting on Top of the World" (Ray Henderson, Sam M. Lewis, Joe Young) – 12:20
4. "Manteca" (Gil Fuller, Dizzy Gillespie, Chano Pozo) – 9:20
5. "Get That Booty" (Gillespie) – 2:22
6. "Kisses" (Gillespie) – 6:40

== Personnel ==
- Dizzy Gillespie – trumpet, piano, cowbell, Jew's harp, vocals
- Toots Thielemans – guitar
- Bernard Purdie – drums
