= The Dizzy Gillespie Reunion Big Band =

Live album by Dizzy Gillespie
- Released: 1968
- Recorded: November 7, 1968
- Venue: Berlin Philharmonic Hall, Berlin Jazz Festival, Germany
- Genre: Jazz
- Length: 39:34
- Label: MPS
- Producer: Joachim-Ernst Berendt

Dizzy Gillespie chronology
Live at the Village Vanguard (1967)	The Dizzy Gillespie Reunion Big Band (1968)	It's My Way (1969)

The Dizzy Gillespie Reunion Big Band (subtitled 20th and 30th Anniversary) is a live album by trumpeter Dizzy Gillespie that was recorded at the Berlin Jazz Festival in 1968 and released by MPS.

== Reception ==
The Allmusic review stated "This little-known LP actually contains one of Dizzy Gillespie's greatest performances of the 1960s... Although already 51, the trumpeter is heard at his best on this hard-to-find but essential LP".

Professional ratings
Review scores
Source	Rating
Allmusic	4.5/5 stars

== Track listing ==
1. "Things to Come" (Dizzy Gillespie, Gil Fuller) - 5:29
2. "One Bass Hit" (Gillespie, Fuller) - 6:35
3. "Frisco" (Mike Longo) - 7:55
4. "Con Alma" (Gillespie) - 10:15
5. "The Things Are Here" (Gillespie) - 7:40
6. "Theme - Birks' Works" (Gillespie, Barney Kessel) - 1:40

== Personnel ==
- Dizzy Gillespie – trumpet
- Stu Hamer – trumpet
- Jimmy Owens – trumpet
- Victor Paz – trumpet
- Dizzy Reece – trumpet
- Curtis Fuller – trombone
- Ted Kelly – trombone
- Tom McIntosh – trombone
- James Moody – alto saxophone, tenor saxophone
- Sahib Shihab – alto saxophone, baritone saxophone
- Chris Woods – alto saxophone
- Paul Jeffrey – tenor saxophone
- Cecil Payne – baritone saxophone
- Mike Longo – piano
- Paul West – double bass
- Otis Finch – drums
