= Closer to the Source (Dizzy Gillespie album) =

Studio album by Dizzy Gillespie
- Released: 1984
- Recorded: 1984
- Studio: Bear Tracks (New York), A&M Studios (California) and Criteria Studio (Miami)
- Genre: Jazz; Smooth Jazz
- Length: 38:02
- Label: Atlantic; 81646-1
- Producer: T. Brooks Shepard

Dizzy Gillespie chronology
To a Finland Station (1982)	Closer to the Source (1984)	New Faces (1985)

Closer to the Source is an album by trumpeter Dizzy Gillespie, recorded in 1984, featuring an all star cast of guest musicians and released on the Atlantic label.

== Critical reception ==
Professional ratings
Review scores
Source	Rating
AllMusic	1/5 stars
The Penguin Guide to Jazz Recordings	1.5/4 stars

The AllMusic review stated: "This set of commercial material (with guest spots by Stevie Wonder, tenor saxophonist Branford Marsalis and bassist Marcus Miller) is quite forgettable -- throwaway funk tunes with the parts of the sidemen sounding as if they were phoned in".

The album was also Grammy nominated in the category of Best Jazz Instrumental Performance, Soloist.

== Track listing ==
1. "Could It Be You" (Marcus Miller) - 5:15
2. "It's Time for Love" (Kenny Gamble, Leon Huff) - 5:01
3. "Closer to the Source" (Leroy Hutson, Lonnie Reaves, Alfonzo Surrett) - 4:58
4. "You're No. 1 in My Book" (Dana Meyers, Wilmer Raglin Jr., Leon F. Silvers, William Zimmerman) - 4:23
5. "Iced Tea" (Vincent Fielder) - 6:21
6. "Just Before Dawn" (Delores Allen, Al Foster) - 4:54
7. "Textures" (Herbie Hancock) - 7:10

== Personnel ==
- Dizzy Gillespie - trumpet
- Sonny Fortune - alto saxophone
- Branford Marsalis - tenor saxophone (track 2)
- Barry Eastmond, Kenny Kirkland - keyboards
- Hiram Bullock - guitar
- Tom Barney - bass
- Marcus Miller - synthesizer, bass
- Stevie Wonder - synthesizer, harmonica (track 3)
- Buddy Williams, Tony Cintron Jr. - drums
- Angel Rogers - vocals
