= Groovin' High (Dizzy Gillespie album) =

Compilation album by Dizzy Gillespie
- Released: 1955
- Recorded: 1945 – December 11, 1947
- Genre: Jazz, bebop
- Length: 36:38
- Label: Savoy

Groovin' High is a 1955 compilation album of studio sessions by jazz composer and trumpeter Dizzy Gillespie. The Rough Guide to Jazz describes the album as "some of the key bebop small-group and big band recordings."

== Reception ==
Jazz critic Scott Yanow concedes that the music included is classic, but dismisses the compilation over-all as "so-so" because of its brevity, because of the outdated and lightweight liner notes and because the material presented does not represent the complete sessions at which the material was played. The compilation features Gillespie with a number of combinations and other musicians, including his 1946 big band, Charlie Parker, a sextet with Dexter Gordon and a combo featuring Sonny Stitt.

Professional ratings
Review scores
Source	Rating
The Encyclopedia of Popular Music	3/5 stars

== Track listing ==
1. "Blue 'n' Boogie" (Dizzy Gillespie, Frank Paparelli) – 3:00
2. "Groovin' High" (Gillespie) – 2:40
3. "Dizzy Atmosphere" (Gillespie) – 2:45
4. "All the Things You Are" (Oscar Hammerstein, Jerome Kern) – 2:52
5. "Hot House" (Tadd Dameron) – 2:27
6. "Salt Peanuts" (Kenny Clarke, Gillespie) – 2:20
7. "Oop Bop Sh'Bam" (Ray Brown, Gil Fuller, Gillespie) – 3:06
8. "That's Earl, Brother" (Brown, Fuller, Gillespie) – 2:55
9. "Things to Come" (Fuller, Gillespie) – 2:47
10. "One Bass Hit, Pt. 2" (Brown, Fuller, Gillespie) – 2:46
11. "Ray's Idea" (Brown, Fuller, Gillespie) – 3:09
12. "Our Delight" (Dameron) – 2:40
13. "Emanon" (Gillespie, Shaw) – 3:11

== Personnel ==
- Ray Abrams – tenor saxophone
- Taswell Baird – trombone
- John Brown – alto saxophone
- Ray Brown – bass
- Slam Stewart – bass
- Dave Burns – trumpet
- Scoops Carey – alto saxophone
- Big Sid Catlett – drums
- Kenny Clarke – drums
- Cozy Cole – drums
- Leon Cormenge – trombone
- Talib Dawud – trumpet
- Kenny Dorham – trumpet
- Bill Frazier – saxophone
- Dizzy Gillespie – trumpet, leader
- Dexter Gordon – tenor saxophone
- Al Haig – piano
- Joe Harris – drums
- Clyde Hart – piano
- Milt Jackson – vibraphone
- Howard E. Johnson – alto saxophone
- Yujiro Kasai – remastering
- John Lewis – piano
- Warren Lucky – tenor saxophone
- John Lynch – trumpet
- Shelly Manne – drums
- Matthew McKay – trumpet
- Alton Moore – trombone
- Raymond Orr – trumpet
- Remo Palmieri – guitar
- Frank Paparelli – piano
- Charlie Parker – alto saxophone
- Leo Parker – baritone saxophone
- Curly Russell – bass
- Murray Shipinski – bass
- Sonny Stitt – alto saxophone
- Gordon Thomas – trombone
- Lucky Thompson – tenor saxophone
- Rudy Van Gelder – remastering
- Chuck Wayne – guitar
- Elmon Wright – trumpet
