= Richard V. Moore =

Richard Vernon Moore Sr.

3rd President of Bethune-Cookman College
- In office 1947–1975
- Preceded by: James A. Colston
- Succeeded by: Oswald P. Bronson Sr.

Personal details
- Born: Richard Vernon Moore; November 20, 1906 Quincy, Florida, U.S.
- Died: January 2, 1994 (aged 87) Daytona Beach, Florida, U.S.
- Spouse: Beauford Jones (m. 1934)
- Children: 9
- Education: Georgia Normal and Agricultural College, Knoxville College, Atlanta University
- Profession: Educator, principal, school administrator, university president

Richard Vernon Moore Sr. (November 20, 1906 – January 2, 1994) was an American educator, principal, and university president. He served as the third president of Bethune-Cookman College in Daytona Beach, Florida (1947–1975). Moore was also the state of Florida's first African-American Supervisor of Secondary Schools for Negroes.

== Early life and education ==
Moore was born on November 20, 1906, in Quincy, Florida. He attended elementary and junior schools in Quincy before receiving his high school training at Georgia Normal and Agricultural College.

In 1932, Moore graduated with a bachelor of arts degree from Knoxville College in Tennessee. He received a masters degree from Atlanta University in 1944.

== Career ==
Moore commenced his career as an instructor of Social Studies and Coach of Athletics at Pinellas High School in Clearwater, Florida (1932 to 1934), after which he was appointed the principal of Union Academy in Tarpon Springs, Florida (1934 to 1937), principal of Rosenwald High School in Panama City, Florida (1937 to 1944), then principal of Booker T. Washington High School in Pensacola, Florida (1944 to 1945) and Florida's first African-American Supervisor of Secondary Schools for Negroes.

Moore was appointed president of Bethune-Cookman in 1947. On June 30, 1975, Moore retired as president of the college, during his 28-year tenure, the college grew from 400 to 1,200 students (whilst maintaining an 18:1 faculty student ratio), tripled the number of buildings to 25 (with the construction of the Heyn Chapel (1961), Helen Kottle Memorial Classroom building (1964), Lefevre Residence Hall (1966), Charles Parlin Student Center (1966), Swisher Library (1970), and Ja-Flo Davis Residence Hall (1972), increased its endowment by $800,000, was accredited by the Southern Association of Colleges and Schools in 1970, and joined the United Negro College Fund.

Moore was awarded honorary doctoral degrees from fourteen different universities, including Edward Waters College (1948), Knoxville College (1950), Morris Brown College (1969), Syracuse University (1969), Claflin College (1969), Jacksonville University (1970), Ohio Northern University (1971), Florida Institute of Technology (1972), Florida International University (1972), Bethune-Cookman College (1973), Rust College (1974), Florida Southern College (1975), Florida Atlantic University (1975) and University of Florida (1983).

Moore married Beauford Jones in 1934 and they had nine children, five boys and four girls.

== Death and legacy ==
He died on January 2, 1994, and is buried on the Bethune-Cookman campus. There has been a Richard V. Moore Legacy Society at the college.

Bethune-Cookman's 3,000-seat multi-purpose arena, Moore Gymnasium, is named after him. In 2000 he was honored with the designation as a Great Floridian, and his memorial plaque is located in the front of the Richard V. Moore Community Center, Daytona Beach, Florida.
