= Bird Songs: The Final Recordings =

Live album by Dizzy Gillespie
- Released: 1992
- Recorded: January 23–25, 1992
- Venue: Blue Note Jazz Club, Greenwich Village, New York City
- Genre: Jazz
- Length: 62:58
- Label: Telarc; 83421

Dizzy Gillespie chronology
| The Winter in Lisbon (1990) | Bird Songs: The Final Recordings (1992) | To Bird with Love (1992) |

Bird Songs: The Final Recordings is a live album trumpeter Dizzy Gillespie with an array of guest stars recorded at the Blue Note Jazz Club, New York City in 1992 and released on the Telarc label. The album, along with To Bird with Love and To Diz with Love, represent the last recordings made by the legendary trumpeter before his death in 1993.

== Reception ==
The Allmusic review stated "This album and its companions might have worked better as videos, where one could still bask in Dizzy's live presence and thus experience the atmosphere of this celebration more fully".

Professional ratings
Review scores
| Source | Rating |
|---|---|
| Allmusic | 2/5 stars |
| The Penguin Guide to Jazz Recordings | 2.5/4 stars |

== Track listing ==
All compositions by Dizzy Gillespie except as indicated

1. "Ornithology" (Benny Harris, Charlie Parker) – 15:31
2. "Con Alma" – 9:20
3. "Confirmation" (Parker) – 10:41
4. "A Night in Tunisia" (Dizzy Gillespie, Frank Paparelli) – 21:46
5. "The Diamond Jubilee Blues" – 4:14
6. "Theme" – 1:26

== Personnel ==
- Dizzy Gillespie – trumpet
- Antonio Hart (track 3), Paquito D'Rivera (track 1), Jackie McLean (track 1) – alto saxophone
- Benny Golson (tracks 4–6), Clifford Jordan (track 3), David Sánchez (tracks 4–6) – tenor saxophone
- Danilo Pérez – piano
- George Mraz – bass
- Kenny Washington (tracks 4–6), Lewis Nash (tracks 1–3) – drums
- Bobby McFerrin – vocals (track 1)
