= Giants (Dizzy Gillespie album) =

Live album by Dizzy Gillespie, Bobby Hackett and Mary Lou Williams
- Released: 1971
- Recorded: January 31, 1971; Overseas Press Club, New York City
- Genre: Jazz
- Length: 49:16
- Label: Perception; PLP 19
- Producer: Dizzy Gillespie

Dizzy Gillespie chronology
Portrait of Jenny (1970)	Giants (1971)	Dizzy Gillespie and the Mitchell Ruff Duo in Concert (1971)

Giants (also released as Mary Lou Williams and the Trumpet Giants) is a live album by trumpeters Dizzy Gillespie and Bobby Hackett and pianist Mary Lou Williams recorded in 1971 and originally released on the Perception label.

== Reception ==
The Allmusic review stated "The music (seven standards) is generally quite melodic and swinging but the closer, a classic version of "My Man," steals the show. It is interesting to hear the contrast between the two brassmen. Hackett was always a very complementary player, so the combination works well".

Professional ratings
Review scores
Source	Rating
Allmusic	3/5 stars

== Track listing ==
1. "Love for Sale" (Cole Porter) - 8:22
2. "Autumn Leaves" (Joseph Kosma, Johnny Mercer, Jacques Prévert) - 6:33
3. "Caravan" (Duke Ellington, Irving Mills, Juan Tizol) - 6:19
4. "Jitterbug Waltz" (Fats Waller) - 7:10
5. "Willow Weep for Me" (Ann Ronell) - 5:23
6. "Birk's Works" (Dizzy Gillespie) - 7:06
7. "My Man" (Jacques Charles, Channing Pollock, Albert Willemetz, Maurice Yvain) - 8:23

== Personnel ==
- Dizzy Gillespie, Bobby Hackett - trumpet
- Mary Lou Williams - piano
- George Duvivier - bass
- Grady Tate - drums
