= Live at the Royal Festival Hall (Dizzy Gillespie album) =

Live album by Dizzy Gillespie
- Released: 1990
- Recorded: June 10, 1989
- Venue: Royal Festival Hall, London, England
- Genre: Jazz
- Length: 71:40
- Label: Enja (1989); Eagle Records (2001)
- Director: Stanley Dorfman

Dizzy Gillespie chronology
| Oop-Pop-A-Da (1988) | Live at the Royal Festival Hall (1990) | Max + Dizzy: Paris 1989 (1989) |

Live at the Royal Festival Hall is an album by Dizzy Gillespie and the United Nation Orchestra. It won the Grammy Award for Best Large Jazz Ensemble Album in 1991. The concert was also released on DVD.

== Reception ==
The AllMusic review stated "every selection on this excellent CD works" and awarded the album four stars. The JazzTimes review stated "Though Dizzy's tone and technique had slipped a bit in his 72nd year, he could always summon the magic when he needed to... It's a wonder the walls of the Hall didn't come tumbling down".

Professional ratings
Review scores
| Source | Rating |
|---|---|
| Allmusic | 4/5 stars |

== Track listing ==
All compositions by Dizzy Gillespie except where noted.

1. "Tin Tin Deo" (Dizzy Gillespie, Gil Fuller, Chano Pozo) - 10:14
2. "Seresta: Samba for Carmen" (Paquito D'Rivera, Hank Levy) - 8:31
3. "And Then She Stopped" - 7:26
4. "Tanga" - 14:09
5. "Kush" - 9:08
6. "Dizzy Shells" (Steve Turre) - 6:19
7. "A Night in Tunisia" (Gillespie, Felix Paparelli) - 18:51

(The DVD includes additional vocal features of "Moody's Mood for Love" by James Moody and "Esquinas" by Flora Purim.)

== Personnel ==
- Dizzy Gillespie—trumpet
- Claudio Roditi – trumpet, percussion
- Arturo Sandoval – trumpet, flugelhorn, piccolo trumpet
- Slide Hampton – trombone, arranger
- Steve Turre – trombone, bass trombone, shells
- Paquito D'Rivera – alto saxophone, clarinet, percussion
- James Moody – alto saxophone, tenor saxophone, flute, percussion
- Mario Rivera – tenor saxophone, soprano saxophone, percussion
- John Lee – bass guitar
- Ed Cherry – guitar
- Danilo Pérez – piano
- Flora Purim – vocals
- Ignacio Berroa – drums, percussion
- Airto Moreira – percussion, drums
- Giovanni Hidalgo – percussion, congas
