= Max + Dizzy: Paris 1989 =

Live album by Max Roach and Dizzy Gillespie
- Released: 1990
- Recorded: March 23, 1989
- Venue: Maison de la Culture de la Seine-Saint-Denis, Bobigny, France
- Genre: Jazz
- Length: 125:52
- Label: A&M; CD 6404
- Producer: John Snyder

Dizzy Gillespie chronology
Live at the Royal Festival Hall (1989)	Max + Dizzy: Paris 1989 (1990)	The Paris All Stars Homage to Charlie Parker (1989)

Max Roach chronology
Bright Moments (1986)	Max + Dizzy: Paris 1989 (1989)	The Paris All Stars Homage to Charlie Parker (1989)

Max + Dizzy: Paris 1989 is a live album by drummer Max Roach and trumpeter Dizzy Gillespie recorded in France in 1989 and released on the A&M label.

== Reception ==
The Allmusic review stated "This double-CD set is a big mistake. Teaming drummer Max Roach and trumpeter Dizzy Gillespie together as a duo might have worked had it taken place 20 years earlier when Dizzy was still in his musical prime. However the immortal players did not even discuss what they were going to play beforehand and the result is a series of rambling sketches, essentially a long drum solo with occasional trumpet interludes that are full of clams" yet confusingly still awarded the album 4½ stars.

Professional ratings
Review scores
Source	Rating
Allmusic	4.5/5 stars

== Track listing ==
All compositions by Dizzy Gillespie and Max Roach except as indicated

Disc One:

1. "In the Beginning (Part I)" (Roach) - 2:39
2. "In the Beginning (Part II)" (Gillespie) - 4:32
3. "The Arrival" - 3:43
4. "Versailles" - 3:51
5. "Place de la Concorde" - 3:21
6. "Georges Cinq" (Roach) - 1:58
7. "Struttin' on the Champs" - 4:46
8. "Brother K/South Africa Goddamn" (Gillespie/Roach) - 5:54
9. "Salt Peanuts" (Kenny Clarke, Gillespie) - 3:39
10. "Word" - 5:07
11. "Fountain Blues" - 3:03
12. "Bastille Day" - 4:11
13. "The Underground" - 4:41
14. "The Antilles" - 6:11
15. "'Round Midnight" (Thelonious Monk) - 1:41
16. "Messin' Around" - 6:05
17. "Metamorphosis" (Gillespie) - 2:30

Disc Two:

1. "Just Dreaming" (Gillespie) - 2:33
2. "Nairobi" - 9:27
3. "Allen's Alley" (Denzil Best) - 5:04
4. "The Theme" (Art Blakey, Miles Davis, Kenny Dorham) - 0:52
5. "The Smoke That Thunders" (Roach) - 4:46
6. "Oo Pa Pa Da" (Babs Gonzales) - 2:38
7. Interview - 32:40

== Personnel ==
- Dizzy Gillespie - trumpet
- Max Roach - drums
