= To Diz with Love =

Live album by Dizzy Gillespie
- Released: 1992
- Recorded: January 29–31 and February 1, 1992
- Venue: Blue Note Jazz Club, Greenwich Village, New York City
- Genre: Jazz
- Length: 65:48
- Label: Telarc; 83307-25

Dizzy Gillespie chronology
To Bird with Love (1992)	To Diz with Love (1992)

To Diz with Love is a live album by trumpeter Dizzy Gillespie with an array of guest stars recorded at the Blue Note in 1992 and released on the Telarc label. The album, along with To Bird with Love and Bird Songs: The Final Recordings, represent the last recordings made by the trumpeter before his death in 1993.

== Reception ==
The Allmusic review stated "Although he was no longer up to the competition, the love that these fellow trumpeters had for Gillespie (and some fine solos) makes this historic CD worth getting."

Professional ratings
Review scores
Source	Rating
Allmusic	3/5 stars
The Penguin Guide to Jazz Recordings	3/4 stars

== Track listing ==
1. "Billie's Bounce" (Charlie Parker) - 14:31
2. "Confirmation" (Parker) - 10:27
3. "Mood Indigo" (Barney Bigard, Duke Ellington, Irving Mills) - 12:48
4. "Straight, No Chaser" (Thelonious Monk) - 11:22
5. "A Night in Tunisia" (Dizzy Gillespie, Felix Paparelli) - 16:40

== Personnel ==
- Dizzy Gillespie - trumpet
- Doc Cheatham (track 3), Jon Faddis (track 3), Wynton Marsalis (tracks 2 & 4), Claudio Roditi (tracks 1 & 5), Wallace Roney (tracks 1 & 5), Charlie Sepulveda (track 4), Lew Soloff (unbilled, track 5) - trumpet
- Red Rodney - flugelhorn (track 2)
- Junior Mance - piano
- Peter Washington - bass
- Kenny Washington - drums
