= The Giant (Dizzy Gillespie album) =

Live album by Dizzy Gillespie
- Released: 1973
- Recorded: April 13, 1973
- Venue: Paris, France
- Genre: Jazz
- Length: 33:28
- Label: America; AM 6133

Dizzy Gillespie chronology
The Giants of Jazz (1971)	The Giant (1973)	The Source (1973)

The Giant is a live album by trumpeter Dizzy Gillespie. It was recorded in Paris, France, in 1973, and first released on the French America label.

== Reception ==
The Allmusic review stated: "Gillespie plays well enough... Still, the edge is missing on these explorations of standards and recent originals although he is in particularly fine form on the ballads".

Professional ratings
Review scores
Source	Rating
Allmusic	3/5 stars
The Rolling Stone Jazz Record Guide	3/5 stars
The Village Voice	B+
The Penguin Guide to Jazz Recordings	2/4 stars

== Track listing ==
1. "Stella By Starlight" (Victor Young, Ned Washington) - 7:45
2. "I Waited For You" (Gil Fuller, Dizzy Gillespie) - 3:50
3. "The Girl of My Dreams" (Sunny Clapp) - 5:24
4. "Fiesta Mo-Jo" (Gillespie) - 11:21
5. "Serenity" (Kenny Drew) - 5:08

== Personnel ==
- Dizzy Gillespie - trumpet
- Johnny Griffin - tenor saxophone (tracks 4 & 5)
- Kenny Drew - piano
- Niels-Henning Ørsted Pedersen - bass
- Kenny Clarke - drums
- Humberto Canto - conga drums
