= The Real Thing (Dizzy Gillespie album) =

Studio album by Dizzy Gillespie
- Released: 1970
- Recorded: 1969
- Genre: Jazz
- Length: 37:55
- Label: Perception; PLP 002
- Producer: Dizzy Gillespie

Dizzy Gillespie chronology
Cornucopia (1969)	The Real Thing (1970)	Portrait of Jenny (1970)

Professional ratings
Review scores
Source	Rating
Allmusic	3/5 stars

The Real Thing is an album by American jazz trumpeter Dizzy Gillespie featuring James Moody recorded in 1969 and originally released on the Perception label.

== Track listing ==
All compositions by Mike Longo except as indicated

1. "N'Bani" (Dizzy Gillespie) - 4:05
2. "Matrix" - 4:04
3. "Alligator" - 5:06
4. "Closer" [vocal] / "Closer" [instrumental] (George Davis) - 3:17
5. "Soul Kiss" - 4:07
6. "High on a Cloud" (Fred Norman, Cliff Owens) - 3:20
7. "Summertime" (George Gershwin) - 3:46
8. "Let Me Outta Here" - 5:13
9. "Ding-A-Ling" - 5:03

== Personnel ==
- Dizzy Gillespie - trumpet
- James Moody - tenor saxophone (tracks 1, 5-8 & 10)
- Eric Gale (tracks 1, 6, 7 & 10), George Davis (tracks 2–5, 8 & 9) - guitar
- Mike Longo - piano
- Nate Edmonds - organ (track 6)
- Chuck Rainey (track 6), Phil Upchurch (tracks 2–4, 7 & 8) - electric bass
- Paul West - bass (tracks 1, 5, 7 & 10)
- Otis "Candy" Finch (track 1, 7 & 10), David Lee (tracks 2–5, 8 & 9), Bernard Purdie (track 6) - drums
