= Oop Bop Sh'Bam =

Jazz standard by Dizzy Gillespie

"Oop Bop Sh'Bam" is a jazz standard by Dizzy Gillespie. It has been described as "tailor made for tenor saxophone". The song title and word usage developed from "verbalizing the sounds of the new music [bebop]". The scat lyrics, "Oop bop sh'bam a klook a mop", are a homage to drummer Kenny Clarke, nicknamed "Klook", who played drums in a 1946 recording of the composition with Gillespie's sextet.

"Oop Bop Sh'Bam" is based on the "rhythm changes" chord progression with a new middle eight. It was written by Gillespie with Gil Fuller taking writing credit in order to secure publishing royalties.
