= The Winter in Lisbon =

Soundtrack album by Dizzy Gillespie
- Released: 1991
- Recorded: 1990
- Genre: Jazz
- Length: 55:44
- Label: Milan; 35600

Dizzy Gillespie chronology
The Symphony Sessions (1989)	The Winter in Lisbon (1991)	Bird Songs: The Final Recordings (1992)

The Winter in Lisbon is a soundtrack album for the European film of the same name directed by José A. Zorrilla composed and performed by trumpeter Dizzy Gillespie in 1990 and released on the Milan label. The album represents the final studio recordings by the trumpet legend.

== Reception ==
The Allmusic review stated "as with most soundtracks, the music sounds incomplete without the picture". The Guardian review stated "it's a full-on jazz album, with Gillespie fronting a fine band... A fine way to remember a few more of a jazz giant's final choruses".

Professional ratings
Review scores
Source	Rating
Allmusic	2/5 stars
The Guardian	4/5 stars

== Track listing ==
All compositions by Dizzy Gillespie except as indicated

1. "Opening Theme" (Charles Fishman, Gillespie) – 3:28
2. "San Sebastian" – 5:55
3. "Lucretia's Theme" (Gillespie, Danilo Pérez) – 3:38
4. "Magic Summer" [Vocal Version] (Fishman, Gillespie, Leola Jiles) – 5:26
5. "Isthmus" – 8:12
6. "Magic Summer" [Orchestral Version] (Fishman, Gillespie) – 2:30
7. "Lisbon" – 6:09
8. "Magic Summer" [Piano Version] (Fishman, Gillespie) – 4:59
9. "Burma" (Gillespie, Pérez) – 8:08
10. "Bill's Song" – 2:17
11. "Final Theme" (Fishman, Gillespie) – 5:48

== Personnel ==
- Dizzy Gillespie – trumpet
- Leola Jiles – vocals
- Mario Rivera – flute, soprano saxophone
- Danilo Pérez – piano
- George Mraz – bass
- Grady Tate – - drums
- Richard Spencer – viola
- Bob Carlisle – French horn
- Sandra Billingslea – violin
- Akua Dixon – cello
