= It's My Way (Dizzy Gillespie album) =

Studio album by Dizzy Gillespie
- Released: 1969
- Recorded: 1969
- Genre: Jazz
- Length: 34:29
- Label: Solid State SS 18054
- Producer: Richard Carpenter

Dizzy Gillespie chronology
The Dizzy Gillespie Reunion Big Band (1968)	It's My Way (1969)	Cornucopia (1969)

My Way Cover

Professional ratings
Review scores
Source	Rating
Allmusic	2/5 stars

It's My Way (also released as My Way) is an album by American jazz trumpeter Dizzy Gillespie featuring performances of popular songs recorded in 1969 and originally released on the Solid State label.

== Track listing ==
1. "Galveston" (Jimmy Webb) - 2:38
2. "This Girl's in Love with You" (Burt Bacharach, Hal David) - 4:00
3. "Games People Play" (Joe South) - 2:58
4. "Magic Tree" (Richard Carpenter, Gladys Bruce, Gerald Ginsberg) - 3:06
5. "Whatever Possess'd Me" (Tadd Dameron, Bernie Hanighen) - 3:47
6. "Aquarius/Let the Sunshine In" (James Rado, Gerome Ragni, Galt MacDermot) - 3:10
7. "Bésame Mucho" (Consuelo Velázquez) - 4:03
8. "I'm Gonna Sit Right Down and Write Myself a Letter" (Fred E. Ahlert, Joe Young) - 3:03
9. "Exotica" (L. Gillespie) - 4:17
10. "Birk's Works" (Dizzy Gillespie) - 3:27

== Personnel ==
- Dizzy Gillespie - trumpet
- Jerome Richardson - baritone saxophone, flute, piccolo
- Joe De Angelis, Don Corrado, Paul Ingraham - French horn
- Billy Butler - electric guitar
- Paul Griffin - piano
- Bob Bushnell - electric bass
- Joe Marshall - drums
- Paul Fein - tympani
- Unnamed string section arranged and conducted by Jimmy Mundy
