= Pinellas High School =

- Florida; United States

Information
- Type: Public
- Mottoes: Clearwater
- Established: 1934
- Closed: 1968

Pinellas High School was a public high school from 1934 until 1968 in Clearwater, Florida. It served African Americans from the surrounding area of northern Pinellas County including Largo, Clearwater, Dunedin, Safety Harbor and Tarpon Springs during the era of segregation. It was at 1220 Palmetto Street. During its existence, it was the first segregated school in the region and it was the only school exclusively serving Black students in Pinellas County.

The neighborhood of Dansville, which was named for Dan Henry, was one of the areas African Americans lived and were able to buy homes. Residents included orange grove workers. Williams Elementary school was open to African Americans up through 6th grade and then Pinellas High School. During the segregation era, Gibbs High School served African American students in southern Pinellas County.

An elementary school in Clearwater was named for a former principal of the school and is now a museum of African American history, the Pinellas County African American History Museum.

== History ==
The school opened on Madison Avenue. Richard V. Moore taught social studies and coached at Pinellas High School from 1932 until 1934 before serving as the president of Bethune-Cookman College in Daytona Beach. In 1954, a new school building opened on Palmetto Street, where Clearwater Intermediate is now.

== Alumni ==
- Ivory "Dwike" Mitchell Jr., Jazz pianist
- Calvin Harris, (class of 1959) former Pinellas County Commissioner
- Christine Wigfall Morris, the first African American librarian in Clearwater
- Joseph Hatchett, Florida Supreme Court's first African American justice
