= Dee Gee Records =

Record label in Detroit, Michigan, USA

- Parent company: Savoy Records
- Founded: 1951
- Founder: Dizzy Gillespie; Dave Usher
- Defunct: 1953
- Status: Defunct
- Genre: Jazz
- Country of origin: U.S.
- Location: Detroit, Michigan

Dee Gee Records was a jazz record company and independent record label founded in Detroit, Michigan in 1951 by Dizzy Gillespie and Dave Usher.

== History ==
Billboard relates that Dee Gee opened for business on April 7, 1951. According to Gillespie, Dee Gee Records was the result of his desire to control his own recorded output. Dave Usher was a 21-year-old fan and friend of Gillespie. Dee Gee Records was based in Detroit where Usher lived, and its sessions were held there, in New York City, and in Chicago. Initial response was encouraging, and within a short time Dee Gee began to record artists other than Gillespie. But over time Usher found it difficult to handle the financial matters of the company, and in 1953 Dee Gee closed, with Gillespie returning to established firms to make his recordings.

In 1956 the label and its catalog were acquired by Savoy Records, which has controlled it ever since. Despite Dee Gee's failure, Gillespie and Usher remained lifelong friends; after a break from music, Usher became a producer with Argo Records and ultimately the head of Marine Pollution Control, which specializes in cleaning up major industrial oil spills.

== Legacy ==
For Dee Gee, Dizzy Gillespie recorded the first commercially released versions of "Tin Tin Deo", "Birks' Works" and "The Champ". Among others who recorded for Dee Gee were the Milt Jackson Quartet, a predecessor to the Modern Jazz Quartet, Jackie Wilson under the name "Sonny Wilson", drummers Shelly Manne and Kenny Clarke, jazz composer William Russo, jazz singer Annie Ross, and popular vocal group The Tattletales, featuring singer Jerri Adams. Among Gillespie's sidemen were John Coltrane, making some of his first recordings, and guitarist Kenny Burrell, who recorded his first solo on "Birk's Works".

For Savoy, the Dee Gee output provided selections by Gillespie that remained in their catalog for decades, including the albums The Champ and Dee Gee Days: The Savoy Sessions. Gillespie expressed regret at losing control of Dee Gee; running his own label offered a freedom from commercial constraints to experiment with a populist form of bebop, comedy, and elements of calypso, R&B, and other styles. In retrospect, Gillespie complained that some purists within bebop felt he had "sold out".

Dizzy Gillespie's Dee Gee Records label is not to be confused with a 1960s Dee Gee Records (named after Doris Gilbert) based in Hollywood, nor a 1980s Dee Gee Records based in Wooster, Ohio.
