= Mike Longo =

American pianist and composer (1937–2020)

- Born: March 19, 1937; Cincinnati, Ohio, US
- Died: March 22, 2020 (aged 83) New York City
- Genres: Jazz
- Occupations: Musician, composer, author
- Instrument: Piano
- Spouse: Dorothy Longo

Michael Josef Longo (March 19, 1937 – March 22, 2020) was an American jazz pianist, composer, and author.

== Early life ==
Longo was born in Cincinnati, Ohio to parents who had a musical background. His father played bass, his mother played organ at church, and his music training began at a young age. Mike recalled seeing Sugar Chile Robinson playing boogie woogie piano: "The first time I saw him, man, he knocked me out. I must have been three or four years old. He played after the Count Basie show, so I went home and started picking out boogie woogie bass lines." His parents took him for formal lessons at the Cincinnati Conservatory of Music at four. He moved to Fort Lauderdale, Florida soon after. At the age of 12, he won a local talent contest.

== Career ==
Longo's career began in his father's band, but later Cannonball Adderley helped him get gigs of his own. Their working relationship pre-dated Adderley's emergence as a band leader. Adderley approached the teenaged Longo because he needed a pianist at his church. At this time the town was largely segregated, so the white Longo playing at a black church was unusual. When this led to recordings with Adderley in the mid-1950s, Longo was too young to go to clubs with him. Longo played at Porky's, which was later portrayed in the movie. He would go on to receive his Bachelor of Music degree from Western Kentucky University.

Dizzy Gillespie heard Longo at the Metropole. "I was playing downstairs with Red Allen, and Dizzy was playing upstairs with his band. So every time he wanted to go outside for a break, he had to come down the stairs and pass us on the way out. There was a joint across the street called the Copper Rail, which was a soul food restaurant and a bar where the musicians from the Metropole would all hang out. Soon I learned Dizzy mentioned me in an interview in International Musician, the musician union's magazine, when he was asked about any promising young musicians he'd heard." Longo was a fan of Oscar Peterson from a young age and he studied with the pianist from 1961 to 1962. "In terms of technique, touch, I was playing with locked wrists and too much arm technique. The main thing I got from Peterson was how to play piano and how to be a jazz pianist- textures, voicings, touch, time, conception, tone on the instrument."

In the 1960s, Longo began to lead the Mike Longo Trio, which would remain active for the next 42 years. Gillespie was playing at the Metropole again and Longo, depressed after divorcing his first wife, had just gained a gig at Embers West playing with Roy Eldridge. Eldridge brought Gillespie to see Longo playing with Paul Chambers. Gillespie hired Longo the next day. Longo became musical director for the Dizzy Gillespie Quintet and later Gillespie chose him to be the pianist for the Dizzy Gillespie All-Star Band. From 1966 onward, his music career would be linked to Gillespie. In 1993, Longo was with Gillespie on the night he died and later delivered a eulogy at his funeral.

Longo performed at weekly jazz sessions held at the Baháʼí center in honor of Gillespie, a tradition he helped start. Like Gillespie, he was a member of the Baháʼí Faith. Longo also taught a master class to upcoming jazz musicians including Adam Rafferty. Longo's big band, the New York State of the Art Jazz Ensemble, would play at the center intermittently and provide upcoming musicians a chance to learn on stage and the audience receives a jazz experience at reasonable cost. A big part of Mike Longo's mission was to re-establish the apprenticeship relationship in teaching jazz. He said "I know jazz education is an important thing and I know that the field means well, but there seems to be a trend in that field to teach jazz where people are actually copying off recordings instead of actually learning to play jazz. The apprenticeship aspect of jazz has always been the way it has evolved."

== Awards and honors ==
Mike Longo received a scholarship from the Ft. Lauderdale Symphony Orchestra in 1955, a Downbeat Hall of Fame Scholarship in 1959, and a National Endowment for the Arts Grant in 1972. He was inducted into Western Kentucky University's Wall of Fame in 2002.

== Death ==
Longo died in Manhattan on March 22, 2020, three days after his 83rd birthday, from complications of COVID-19. He was survived by his wife of 32 years, Dorothy Longo.

== Discography ==
=== As leader/co-leader ===
Year recorded	Title	Label	Personnel/Notes
1962?	A Jazz Portrait of Funny Girl	Clamike	Trio, with Herman Wright (bass), Roy Brooks (drums)
1972	The Awakening	Mainstream	
1972	Matrix	Mainstream	
1974	Funkia	Groove Merchant	
1974	900 Shares of the Blues	Groove Merchant	
1976	Talk with the Spirits	Pablo	Septet, with Virgil Jones (trumpet), Harold Vick (tenor sax), George Davis (guitar), Bob Cranshaw (bass), Mickey Roker (drums), Dizzy Gillespie (congas, vocals)
1977	Jazzberry Patch	JPB	
1978	New York '78	Consolidated Artists	With big band; released 1990s
1981	Solo Recital	Consolidated Artists	
1990	The Earth Is But One Country	Consolidated Artists	
1993	First Impressions	Consolidated Artists	
1997	I Miss You John	Consolidated Artists	
1998	Dawn of a New Day	Consolidated Artists	
2000	Explosion	Consolidated Artists	With the New York State of the Art Jazz Ensemble
2001	Still Swingin'	Consolidated Artists	Trio, with Ben Brown (bass), Ray Mosca (drums)
2001	Aftermath	Consolidated Artists	With big band
2002	Live: The Detroit International Jazz Festival	Consolidated Artists	Trio, with Santi Debriano (bass), Ray Mosca (drums); in concert
2004	Oasis	Consolidated Artists	With big band
2007	Float Like a Butterfly	Consolidated Artists	Trio, with Paul West (bass), Jimmy Wormworth (drums)
2009	Sting Like a Bee	Consolidated Artists	Trio, with Bob Cranshaw (bass), Lewis Nash (drums)
2011	To My Surprise	Consolidated Artists	Six tracks trio, with Bob Cranshaw (bass), Lewis Nash (drums); six tracks quintet, with Lance Bryant (tenor sax), Jimmy Owens (trumpet) added
2012	A Celebration of Diz and Miles	Consolidated Artists	Trio, with Paul West (bass), Ray Mosca (drums); in concert
2013	Celebrates Oscar Peterson	Consolidated Artists	Trio, with Paul West (bass), Ray Mosca (drums); in concert
2017	Only Time Will Tell	Consolidated Artists	Trio, with Paul West (bass), Lewis Nash (drums)

=== As sideman ===
With Dizzy Gillespie

- Swing Low, Sweet Cadillac (Impulse!, 1967)
- The Dizzy Gillespie Reunion Big Band (MPS, 1968)
- The Real Thing (Perception, 1969)
- Portrait of Jenny (Perception, 1970)

With Lee Konitz

- Chicago 'n All That Jazz (Groove Merchant, 1975)
