= Dizzy Gillespie =

American jazz trumpeter (1917–1993)

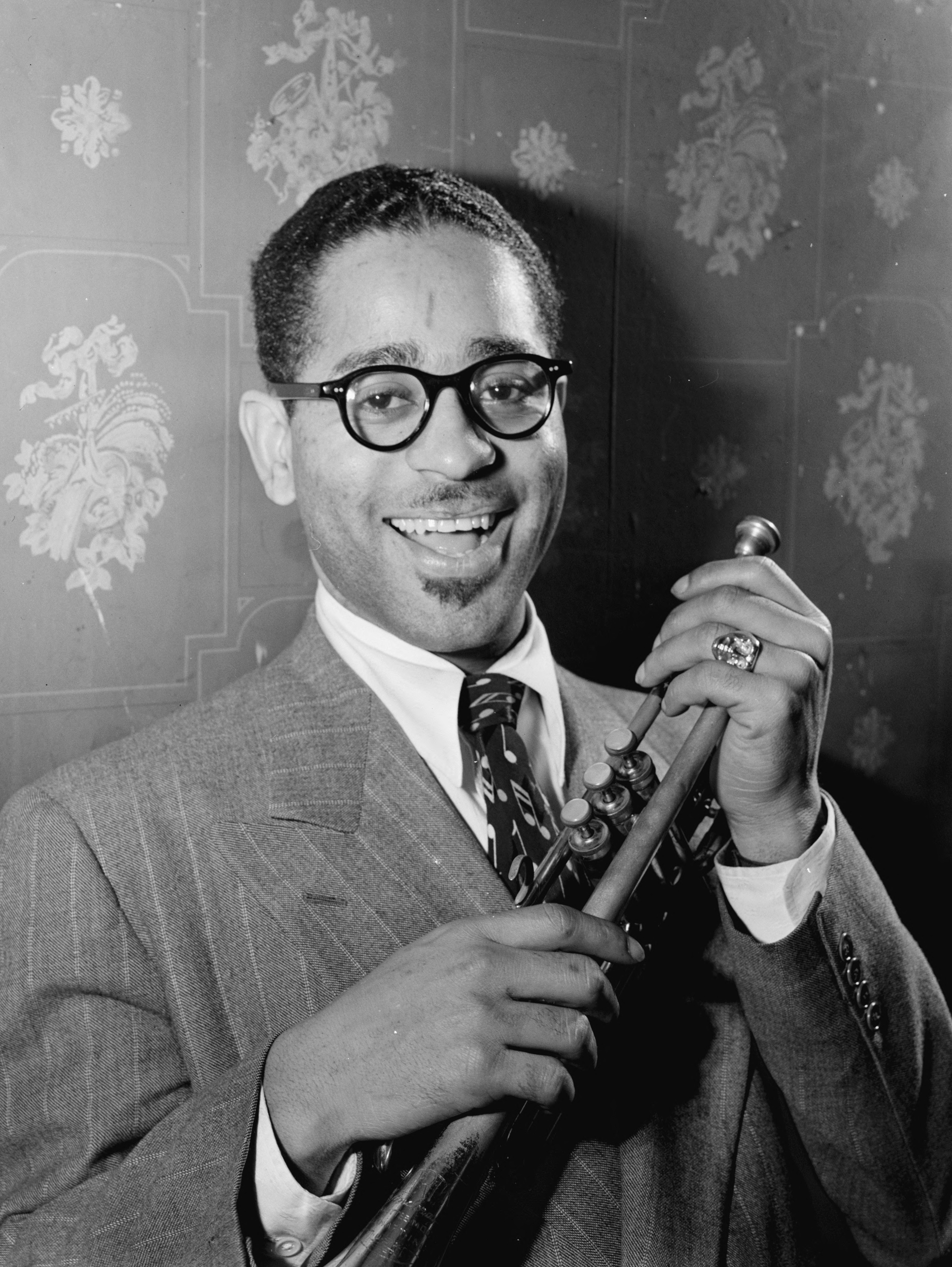
- Gillespie in 1946

Background information
- Born: John Birks Gillespie; October 21, 1917; Cheraw, South Carolina, U.S.
- Died: January 6, 1993 (aged 75) Englewood, New Jersey, U.S.
- Genres: Jazz; bebop; Afro-Cuban jazz
- Occupations: Musician; composer
- Instruments: Trumpet; vocals; piano
- Works: List of works by Dizzy Gillespie
- Years active: 1935–1993
- Labels: Dee Gee; Pablo; RCA Victor; Savoy; Verve; Discovery; Impulse!
- Spouse: Lorraine Willis (m. 1940)
- Children: Jeanie Bryson

John Birks "Dizzy" Gillespie (/ɡɪˈlɛspi/ ghih-LES-pee; October 21, 1917 – January 6, 1993) was an American jazz trumpeter, bandleader, composer, educator, and singer. He was a trumpet virtuoso and improviser, building on the virtuosic style of Roy Eldridge but adding layers of harmonic and rhythmic complexity previously unheard in jazz. His combination of musicianship, showmanship, and wit made him a leading popularizer of early bebop styles. His beret and horn-rimmed spectacles, scat singing, bent horn, pouched cheeks, and light-hearted personality have made him an enduring icon.

In the 1940s, Gillespie, with Charlie Parker, became a major figure in the development of bebop and modern jazz. He taught and influenced many other musicians, including trumpeters Miles Davis, Jon Faddis, Fats Navarro, Clifford Brown, Arturo Sandoval, Lee Morgan, Chuck Mangione, and balladeer Johnny Hartman.

He won several Grammy Awards. Critic Scott Yanow wrote, "Dizzy Gillespie's contributions to jazz were huge. One of the greatest jazz trumpeters of all time, Gillespie was such a complex player that his contemporaries ended up being similar to those of Miles Davis and Fats Navarro instead, and it was not until Jon Faddis's emergence in the 1970s that Dizzy's style was successfully recreated [...] Gillespie is remembered, by both critics and fans alike, as one of the greatest jazz trumpeters of all time".

== Biography ==
=== Early life and career ===
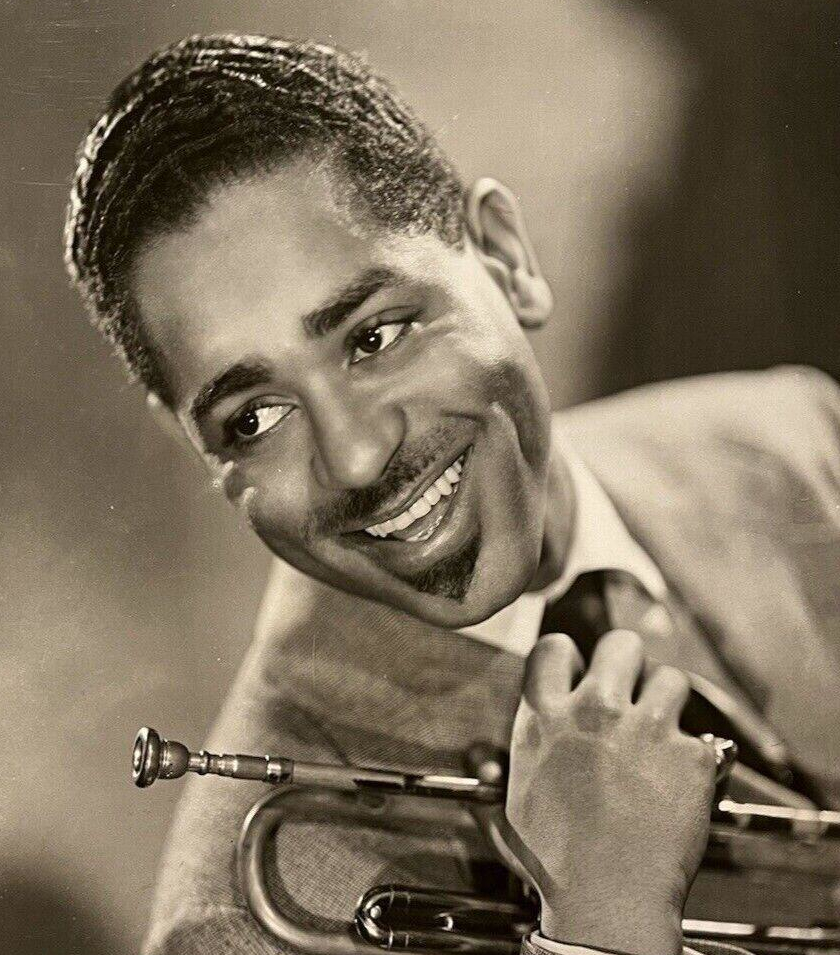
Gillespie in a publicity photo (1955)

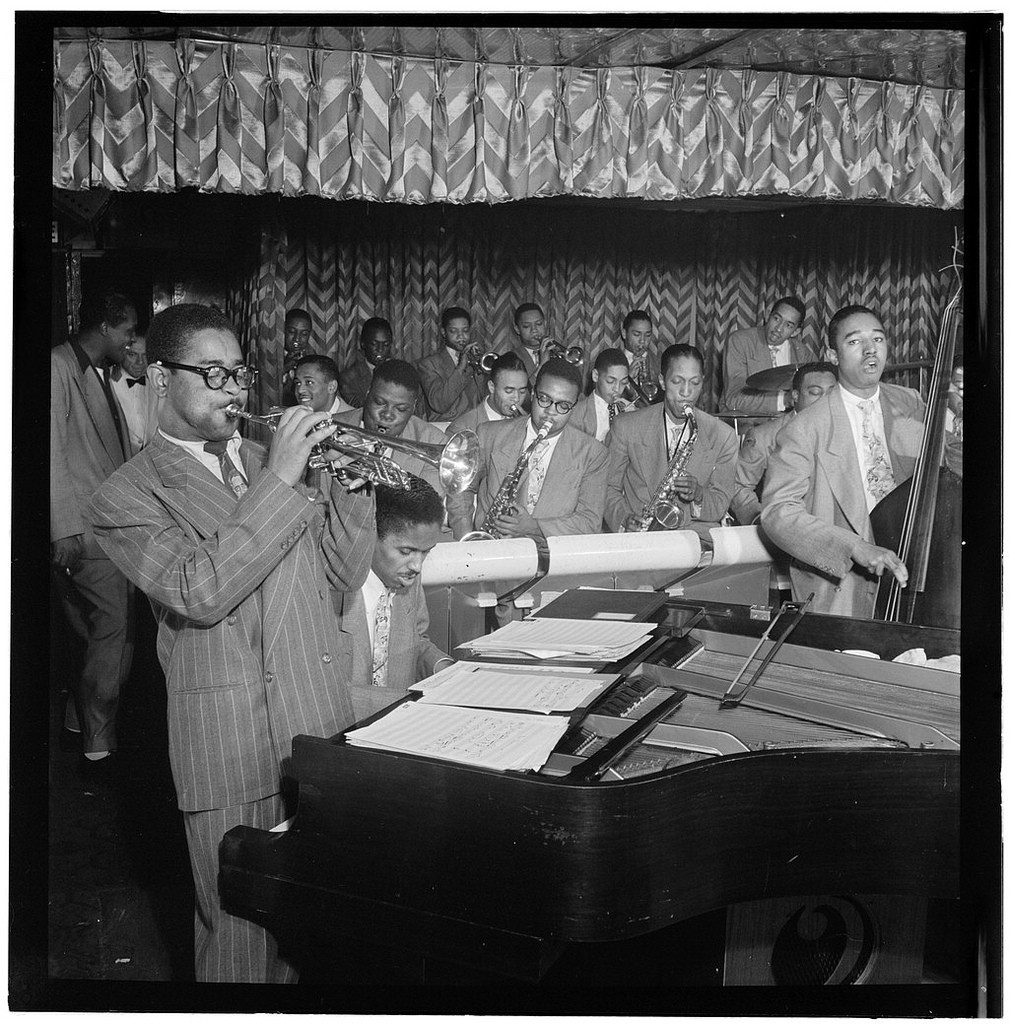
Gillespie (left), with John Lewis, Cecil Payne, Miles Davis, and Ray Brown, between 1946 and 1948

The youngest of nine children of Lottie and James Gillespie, Dizzy Gillespie was born in Cheraw, South Carolina. His father was a local bandleader, so instruments were made available to the children. James died when Dizzy was only ten years old.

Gillespie started to play the piano at age four; by the time he was 12, he taught himself how to play the trombone and the trumpet.

From the night Gillespie heard his idol, Roy Eldridge, on the radio, he dreamed of becoming a jazz musician. He won a music scholarship to the Laurinburg Institute in North Carolina, which he attended for two years before accompanying his family when they moved to Philadelphia in 1935.

Gillespie's first professional job was with the Frank Fairfax Orchestra in 1935, after which he joined the orchestras of Edgar Hayes and later Teddy Hill, replacing Frankie Newton as second trumpet in May 1937. Teddy Hill's band was where Gillespie made his first recording, "King Porter Stomp". In August 1937, while gigging with Hayes in Washington, D.C., Gillespie met a young dancer named Lorraine Willis who worked a Baltimore–Philadelphia–New York City circuit which included the Apollo Theater. Willis was not immediately friendly, but Gillespie was attracted anyway. The two married on May 9, 1940.

Gillespie stayed with Teddy Hill's band for a year, then left and freelanced with other bands. In 1939, with the help of Willis, Gillespie joined Cab Calloway's orchestra. He recorded one of his earliest compositions, "Pickin' the Cabbage", with Calloway in 1940. After an altercation between the two, Calloway fired Gillespie in late 1941.

The incident is recounted by Gillespie and Calloway's band members Milt Hinton and Jonah Jones in Jean Bach's 1997 film, The Spitball Story. Calloway disapproved of Gillespie's mischievous humor and his adventuresome approach to soloing. According to Jones, Calloway referred to it as "Chinese music". During rehearsal, someone in the band threw a spitball. Already in a foul mood, Calloway blamed Gillespie, who refused to take the blame. Gillespie stabbed Calloway in the leg with a knife; Calloway had minor cuts on the thigh and wrist. After the two were separated, Calloway fired Gillespie. A few days later, Gillespie tried to apologize to Calloway, but he was dismissed.

During his time in Calloway's band, Gillespie began writing big band arrangements for Woody Herman, Jimmy Dorsey, and others. He then freelanced with a few bands, most notably Ella Fitzgerald's orchestra, composed of members of Chick Webb's band.

Gillespie did not serve in World War II. At his Selective Service interview, he told the local board, "in this stage of my life here in the United States whose foot has been in my ass?" and "So if you put me out there with a gun in my hand and tell me to shoot at the enemy, I'm liable to create a case of 'mistaken identity' of who I might shoot." He was classified 4-F.

In 1943, he joined the Earl Hines band. Composer Gunther Schuller said,

... In 1943 I heard the great Earl Hines band which had Bird in it and all those other great musicians. They were playing all the flatted fifth chords and all the modern harmonies and substitutions and Gillespie runs in the trumpet section work. Two years later I read that that was 'bop' and the beginning of modern jazz ... but the band never made recordings.

Gillespie stated, "[p]eople talk about the Hines band being 'the incubator of bop' and the leading exponents of that music ended up in the Hines band. But people also have the erroneous impression that the music was new. It was not. The music evolved from what went before. It was the same basic music. The difference was in how you got from here to here to here ... naturally each age has got its own shit."

Gillespie joined the big band of Hines's long-time collaborator, Billy Eckstine, and it was as a member of Eckstine's band that he was reunited with fellow band member Charlie Parker. In 1944, Gillespie left Eckstine's band because he wanted to play with a small combo (which typically comprised no more than five musicians, playing trumpet, saxophone, piano, bass, and drums). Dizzy recommended Fats Navarro for the job with Eckstine, who proved to be an ample replacement.

=== Rise of bebop ===
Bebop was known as the first modern jazz style, but was unpopular at its onset. In fact, bebop was not considered revolutionary at first, but was seen as an outgrowth of swing. Regardless, swing introduced a diversity of new musicians in the bebop era, such as Charlie Parker, Thelonious Monk, Bud Powell, Kenny Clarke, Oscar Pettiford, and Gillespie. Through these musicians, a new vocabulary of musical phrases was created. Parker's system also held methods of adding chords to existing chord progressions and implying additional chords within the improvised lines. With Parker, Gillespie performed at famous jazz clubs including Minton's Playhouse and Monroe's Uptown House.

Gillespie compositions like "Groovin' High", "Woody 'n' You", and "Salt Peanuts" sounded radically different, harmonically and rhythmically, from the swing popular at the time. "A Night in Tunisia", written in 1942 while Dizzy was with Earl Hines's band, is noted for its syncopated bass line—a feature common in today's music. "Woody 'n' You" was recorded in a session led by Coleman Hawkins with Gillespie as a featured sideman on February 16, 1944 (on Apollo Records), the first formal recording of bebop. Dizzy appeared in recordings by the Billy Eckstine band and started recording prolifically as a leader and sideman in early 1945. He was not content to let bebop sit in a niche of small groups in small clubs. A concert by one of his small groups in New York's Town Hall on June 22, 1945, presented bebop to a broad audience; recordings of it were released in 2005. He began organizing big bands in late 1945.

In December 1945, Dizzy Gillespie and his Bebop Six, which included Parker, started an extended gig at Billy Berg's club in Los Angeles. Reception was mixed and the band broke up. In February 1946, Gillespie signed a contract with Bluebird Records, gaining the distribution power of RCA for his music. He and his big band headlined the 1946 film Jivin' in Be-Bop.

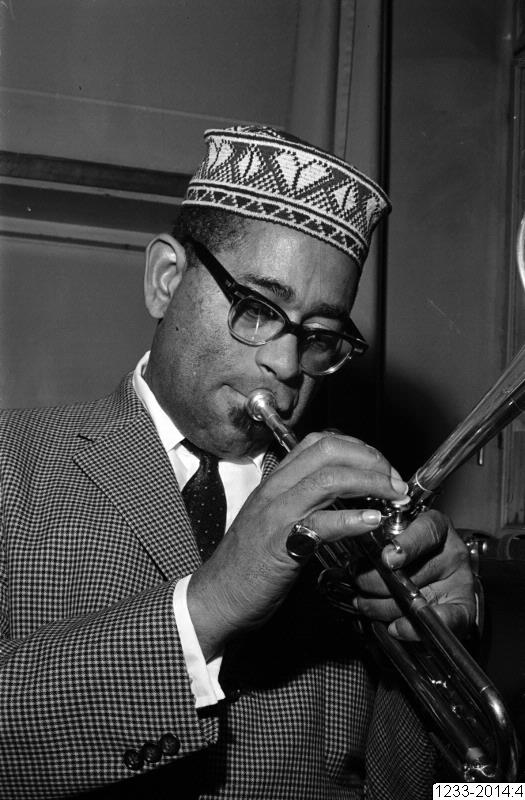
Gillespie performing in Helsingborg, Sweden, 1959

Following his work with Parker, Gillespie led other small combos (including ones with Milt Jackson, John Coltrane, Lalo Schifrin, Ray Brown, Kenny Clarke, James Moody, J. J. Johnson, and Yusef Lateef) and put together his successful big bands starting in 1947. Gillespie and his big bands, with arrangements provided by Tadd Dameron, Gil Fuller, and George Russell, popularized bebop and made him a symbol of the new music.

His big bands of the late 1940s also featured Cuban rumberos Chano Pozo and Sabu Martinez, sparking interest in Afro-Cuban jazz. Gillespie appeared frequently as a soloist with Norman Granz's Jazz at the Philharmonic.

Gillespie and his Bebop Orchestra was the featured star of the 4th Cavalcade of Jazz concert held at Wrigley Field in Los Angeles, which was produced by Leon Hefflin Sr. on September 12, 1948. The young Gillespie had recently returned from Europe where his music was widely popular. The program description noted "the musicianship, inventive technique, and daring of this young man has created a new style, which can be defined as off the chord solo gymnastics." Also performing that day were Frankie Laine, Little Miss Cornshucks, The Sweethearts of Rhythm, the Honeydrippers, Big Joe Turner, Jimmy Witherspoon, the Blenders, and the Sensations.

In 1948, Gillespie was involved in a traffic accident when the bicycle he was riding was bumped by an automobile. He was slightly injured and found he could no longer hit the B-flat above high C. He won the case, but the jury awarded him only $1,000 in view of his high earnings up to that point.

In 1951, Gillespie founded his record label, Dee Gee Records; it closed in 1953.

On January 6, 1953, he threw a party for his wife Lorraine at Snookie's, a club in Manhattan, where his trumpet's bell was accidentally bent upward. However, he liked the sound so much he had a special trumpet made with a 45-degree raised bell, a customization that would become his trademark.

In 1956, Gillespie organized a band to travel on a State Department tour of the Middle East, which was well-received internationally and earned him the nickname "the Ambassador of Jazz". During this time, he also continued to lead a big band that performed throughout the United States and featured musicians including Pee Wee Moore and others. This band recorded a live album at the 1957 Newport Jazz Festival that featured Mary Lou Williams as a guest artist on piano.

=== Afro-Cuban jazz ===
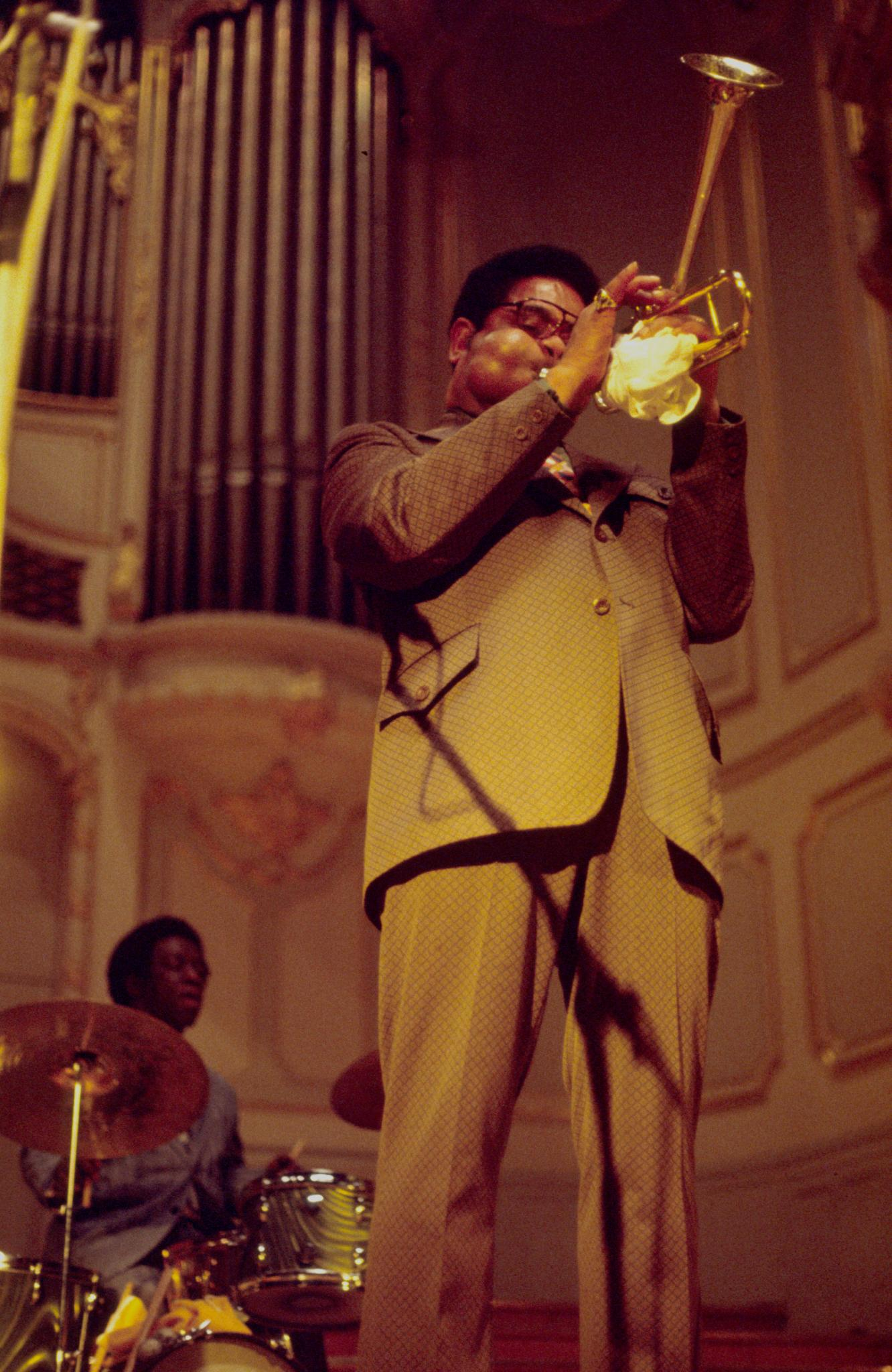
Gillespie performing at a Giants of Jazz concert in 1973 (behind him is drummer Art Blakey)

In the late 1940s, Gillespie was involved in the movement called Afro-Cuban music, bringing Afro-Latin American music and elements to greater prominence in jazz and even pop music, particularly salsa. Afro-Cuban jazz is based on traditional Afro-Cuban rhythms. Gillespie was introduced to Chano Pozo in 1947 by Mario Bauzá, a Latin jazz trumpeter. Pozo became Gillespie's conga drummer for his band. Gillespie also worked with Bauzá in New York jazz clubs on 52nd Street and several famous dance clubs such as the Palladium and the Apollo Theater in Harlem. They played together in the Chick Webb band and the Cab Calloway band, where Gillespie and Bauza became lifelong friends. Gillespie helped develop and mature the Afro-Cuban jazz style. Afro-Cuban jazz was considered bebop-oriented, and some musicians classified it as a modern style. Afro-Cuban jazz was successful because it never decreased in popularity and it always attracted people to dance.

Gillespie's most famous contributions to Afro-Cuban music are the songs "Manteca" and "Tin Tin Deo" (both co-written with Chano Pozo); he was responsible for commissioning George Russell's "Cubano Be, Cubano Bop", which featured Pozo. In 1977, Gillespie met Arturo Sandoval during a jazz cruise to Havana. Sandoval toured with Gillespie and defected in Rome in 1990 while touring with Gillespie and the United Nations Orchestra.

=== Final years ===
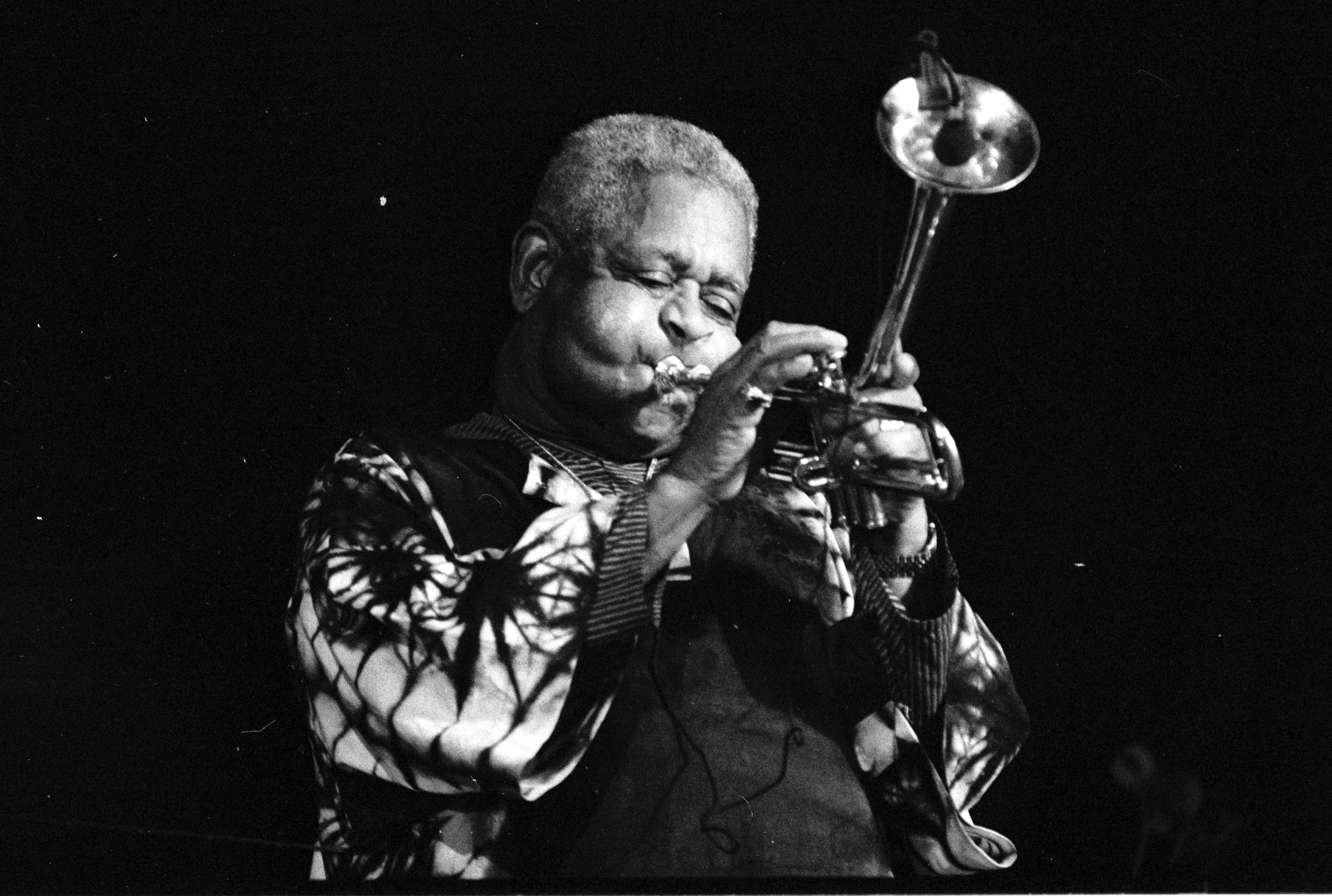
Gillespie in concert, Deauville, Normandy, France, July 1991

In the 1980s, Gillespie led the United Nations Orchestra. For three years, Flora Purim toured with the orchestra. She credits Gillespie with improving her understanding of jazz.

In 1982, he was sought out by Motown musician Stevie Wonder to play his solo in Wonder's 1982 hit single "Do I Do".

He starred in the film The Winter in Lisbon that was released as El invierno en Lisboa in 1992 and re-released in 2004. The soundtrack album, featuring him, was recorded in 1990 and released in 1991. The film is a crime drama about a jazz pianist who falls for a dangerous woman while in Portugal with an American expatriate's jazz band.

In December 1991, during an engagement at Kimball's East in Emeryville, California, he suffered a crisis from what turned out to be pancreatic cancer. He performed one more night but cancelled the rest of the tour for medical reasons, ending his 56-year touring career. He led his last recording session on January 25, 1992.

Gillespie and his touring band performed at Jazz Alley in Seattle for several successive days, the final performance of his touring career being February 29, 1992.

On November 26, 1992, Carnegie Hall, following the Second Baháʼí World Congress, celebrated Gillespie's 75th birthday concert and his offering to the celebration of the centenary of the passing of Baháʼu'lláh. Gillespie was to appear at Carnegie Hall for the 33rd time. The line-up included Jon Faddis, James Moody, Paquito D'Rivera, and the Mike Longo Trio with Ben Brown on bass and Mickey Roker on drums. Gillespie was too unwell to attend, "But the musicians played their real hearts out for him, no doubt suspecting that he would not play again. Each musician gave tribute to their friend, this great soul and innovator in the world of jazz."

=== Death ===
A longtime resident of Englewood, New Jersey, Gillespie died of pancreatic cancer on January 6, 1993, at the age of 75. A private memorial service was held at St. Peter’s Lutheran Church. A public memorial service was held on January 12 at Cathedral of St. John the Divine, with Roberta Flack singing "Amazing Grace". His grave in Flushing Cemetery, Queens, is unmarked.

== Politics and religion ==
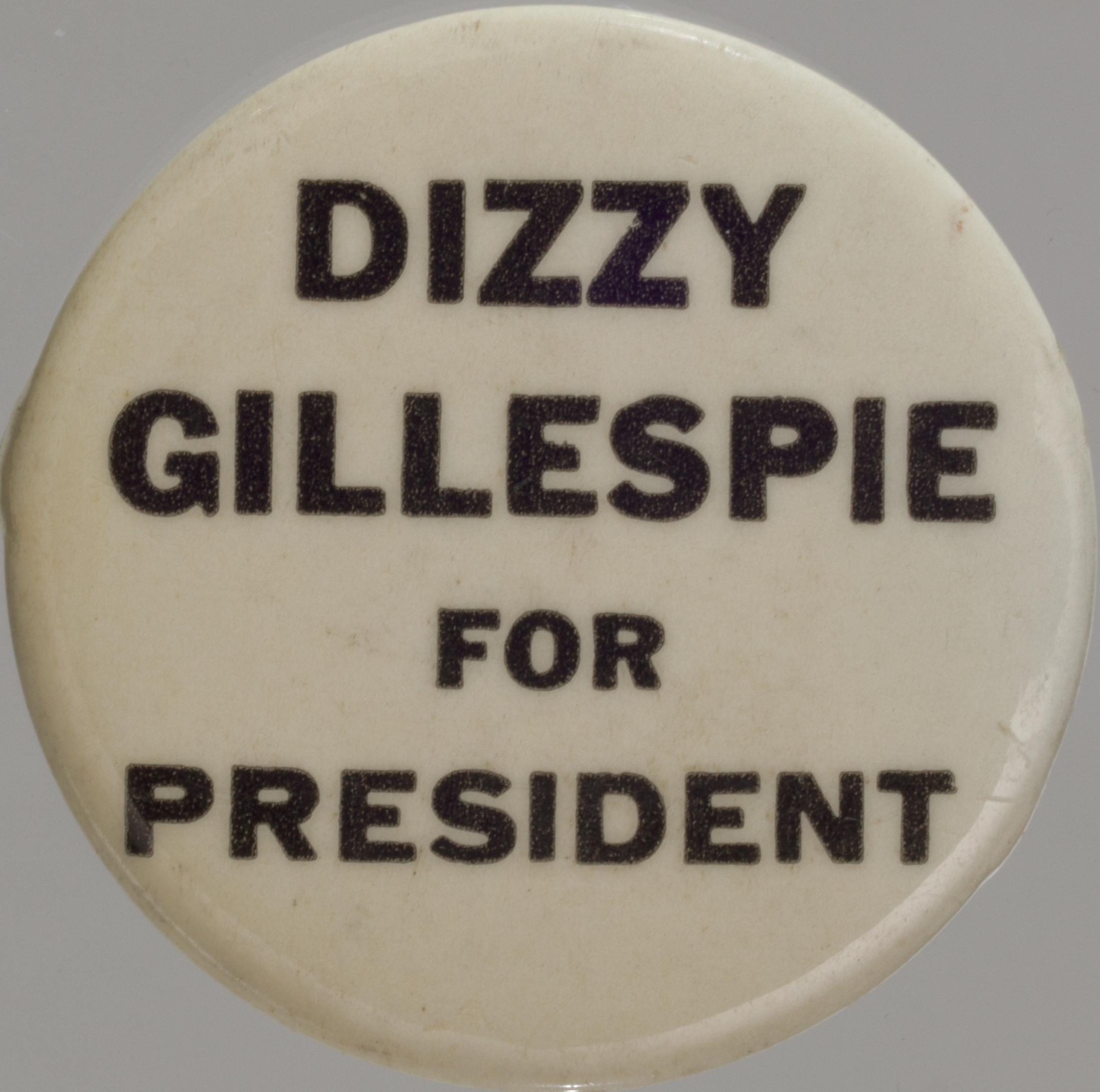
A "Dizzy Gillespie for President" pinback button, 1964

In 1962, Gillespie and actor George Mathews starred in The Hole, an animated short film by John and Faith Hubley. Released the same year as the Cuban Missile Crisis, it uses audio from an improvised conversation between the two debating the causes of accidents and the possibility of accidentally launching nuclear weapons. The short went on to win the Academy Award for Best Animated Short Film the following year.

During the 1964 United States presidential campaign, Gillespie put himself forward as an independent write-in candidate. He promised that if he were elected, the White House would be renamed the Blues House, and he would have a cabinet composed of Duke Ellington (Secretary of State), Miles Davis (Director of the CIA), Max Roach (Secretary of Defense), Charles Mingus (Secretary of Peace), Ray Charles (Librarian of Congress), Louis Armstrong (Secretary of Agriculture), Mary Lou Williams (Ambassador to the Vatican), Thelonious Monk (Travelling Ambassador), and Malcolm X (Attorney General). He said his running mate would be Phyllis Diller. Campaign buttons had been manufactured years before by Gillespie's booking agency as a joke, but proceeds went to the Congress of Racial Equality, the Southern Christian Leadership Conference, and Martin Luther King Jr.; in later years they became a collector's item. In 1971, he announced he would run again but withdrew before the election.

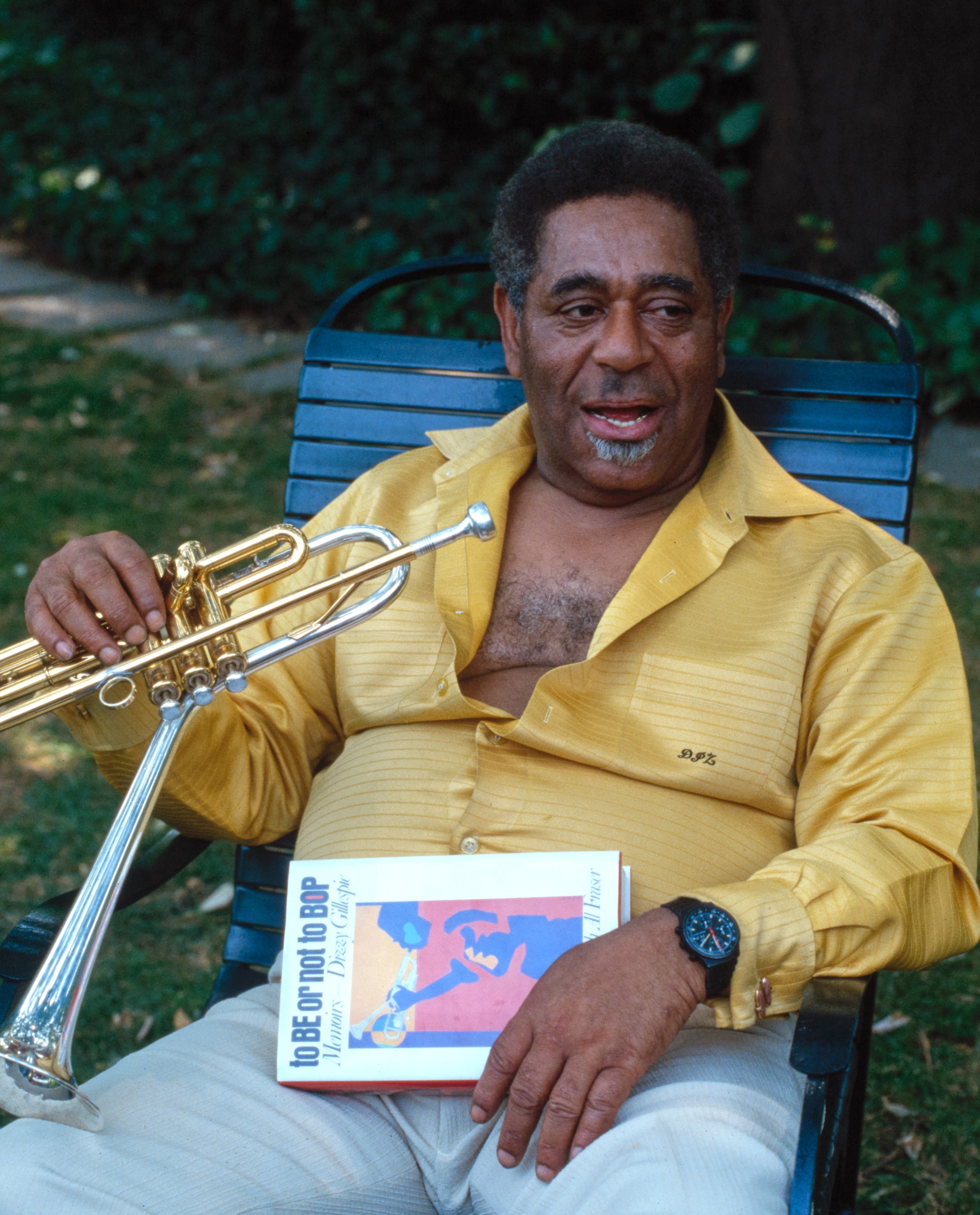
Gillespie holding his memoir: To Be or Not to Bop (1979)

Shortly after the death of Charlie Parker, Gillespie encountered an audience member after a show. They had a conversation about the oneness of humanity and the elimination of racism from the perspective of the Baháʼí Faith. Impacted by the assassination of Martin Luther King Jr. in 1968, he became a Baháʼí that same year. The universalist emphasis of his religion prodded him to see himself more as a global citizen and humanitarian, expanding on his interest in his African heritage. His spirituality brought out generosity and what author Nat Hentoff called an inner strength, discipline, and "soul force".

Gillespie's conversion was most affected by Bill Sears' book Thief in the Night. Gillespie spoke about the Baháʼí Faith frequently on his trips abroad. He is honored with weekly jazz sessions at the New York Baháʼí Center in the memorial auditorium. A concert in honor of his 75th birthday was held in New York City's Carnegie Hall, November 26, 1992, in conjunction with the second Baháʼí World Congress, however, he was too ill to personally attend.

== Personal life ==
Gillespie married dancer Lorraine Willis in Boston on May 9, 1940. They remained together until his death in 1993; Lorraine converted to Catholicism with Mary Lou Williams in 1957. Lorraine managed his business and personal affairs. The couple had no children, but Gillespie fathered a daughter, jazz singer Jeanie Bryson, born in 1958 from an affair with songwriter Connie Bryson. Gillespie met Bryson, a Juilliard-trained pianist, at the Birdland jazz club in New York City. In the mid-1960s, Gillespie settled down in Englewood, New Jersey, with his wife. The local Englewood public high school, Dwight Morrow High School, named its auditorium after him: the Dizzy Gillespie Auditorium.

== Artistry ==
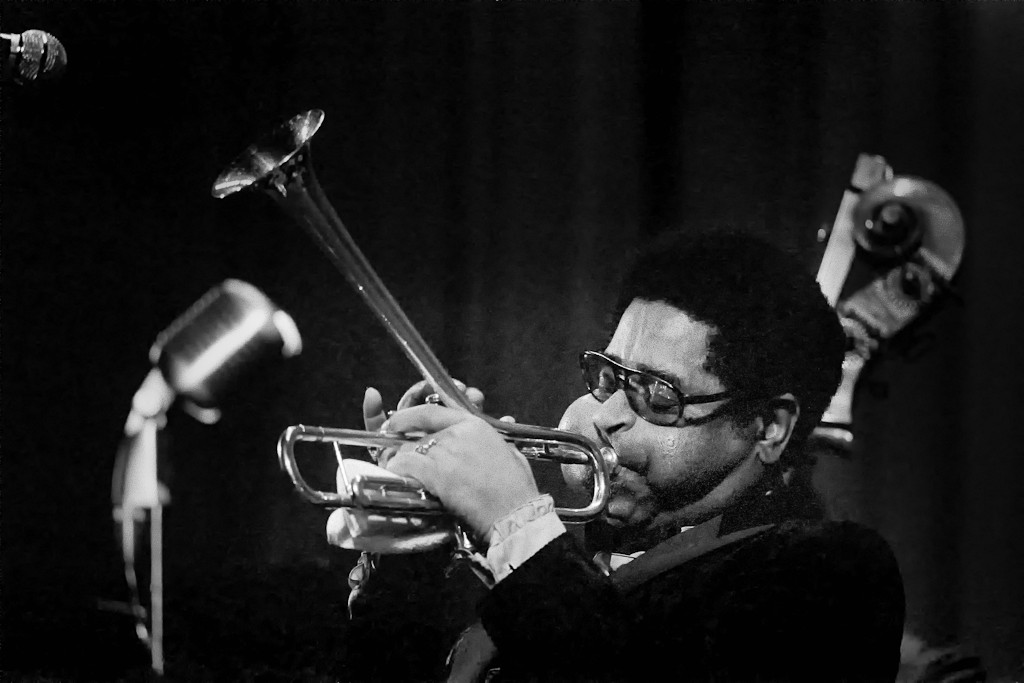
Gillespie performing for The Giants of Jazz in 1971, an exemplar shown also of his cheek-oriented laryngoceles

=== Style ===
Gillespie has been described as the "sound of surprise". The Rough Guide to Jazz describes his musical style:

The whole essence of a Gillespie solo was cliff-hanging suspense: the phrases and the angle of the approach were perpetually varied, breakneck runs were followed by pauses, by huge interval leaps, by long, immensely high notes, by slurs and smears and bluesy phrases; he always took listeners by surprise, always shocking them with a new thought. His lightning reflexes and superb ear meant his instrumental execution matched his thoughts in its power and speed. And he was concerned at all times with swing—even taking the most daring liberties with pulse or beat, his phrases never failed to swing. Gillespie's magnificent sense of time and emotional intensity of his playing came from childhood roots. His parents were Methodists, but as a boy he used to sneak off every Sunday to the uninhibited Sanctified Church. He said later, "The Sanctified Church had deep significance for me musically. I first learned the significance of rhythm there and all about how music can transport people spiritually."

In Gillespie's obituary, Peter Watrous describes his performance style:

In the naturally effervescent Mr. Gillespie, opposites existed. His playing—and he performed constantly until nearly the end of his life—was meteoric, full of virtuosic invention and deadly serious. But with his endlessly funny asides, his huge variety of facial expressions and his natural comic gifts, he was as much a pure entertainer as an accomplished artist.

Wynton Marsalis summarized Gillespie as a player and teacher:

His playing showcases the importance of intelligence. His rhythmic sophistication was unequaled. He was a master of harmony—and fascinated with studying it. He took in all the music of his youth—from Roy Eldridge to Duke Ellington—and developed a unique style built on complex rhythm and harmony balanced by wit. Gillespie was so quick-minded, he could create an endless flow of ideas at unusually fast tempo. Nobody had ever even considered playing a trumpet that way, let alone had actually tried. All the musicians respected him because, in addition to outplaying everyone, he knew so much and was so generous with that knowledge...

=== Bent trumpet ===
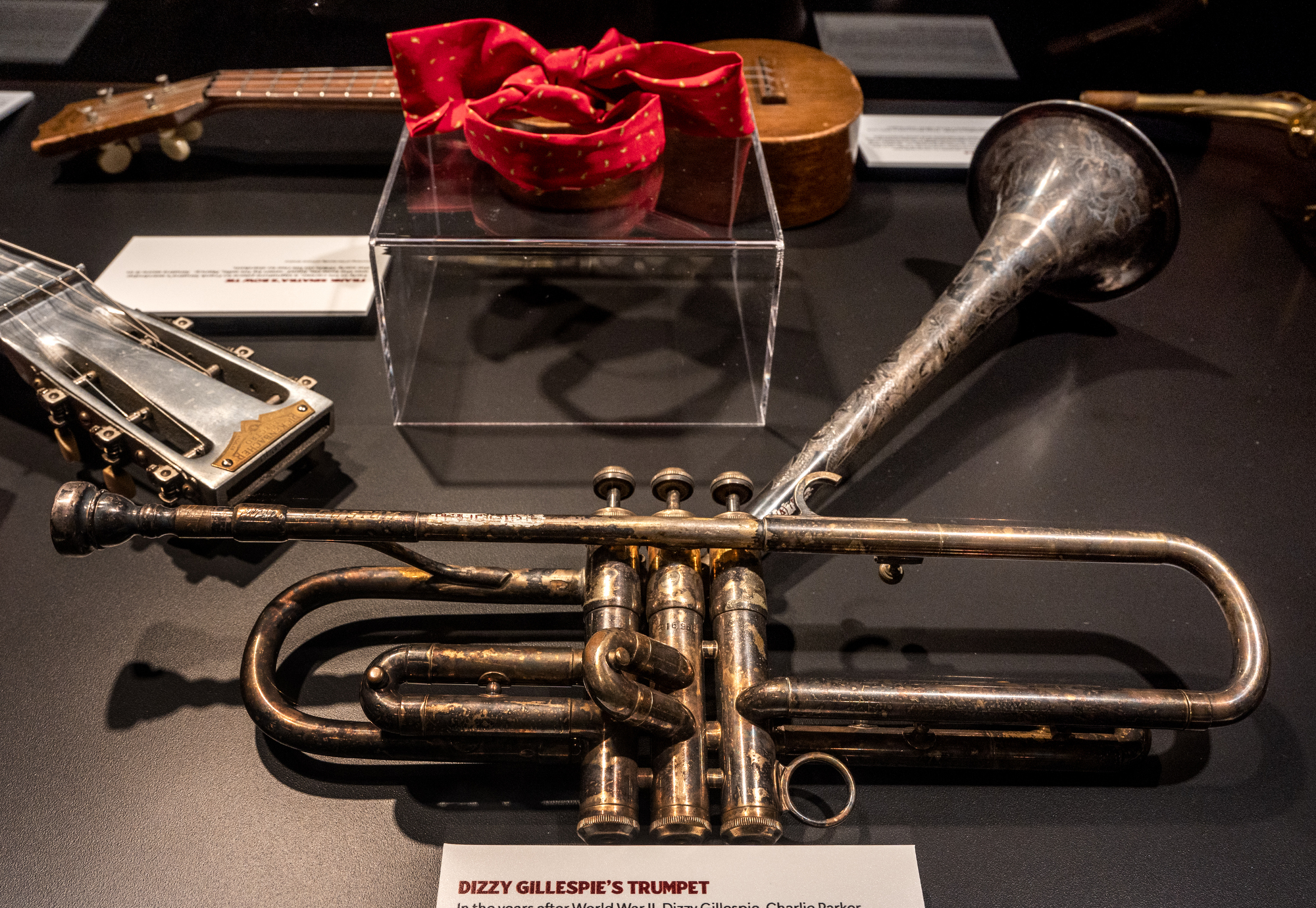
Gillespie's bent trumpet on display at the LBJ Presidential Library in February 2024

Gillespie's trademark trumpet featured a bell which bent upward at a 45-degree angle rather than pointing straight ahead as in the conventional design. According to Gillespie's autobiography, this was originally the result of accidental damage caused by the dancers Stump and Stumpy falling onto the instrument while it was on a trumpet stand on stage at Snookie's in Manhattan on January 6, 1953, during a birthday party for Gillespie's wife Lorraine. The constriction caused by the bending altered the tone of the instrument, and Gillespie liked the effect. He had the trumpet straightened out the next day, but he could not forget the tone. Gillespie sent a request to the Martin Band Instrument Company to make him a "bent" trumpet from a sketch produced by Lorraine, and from that time forward played a trumpet with an upturned bell.

By June 1954, he was using a professionally manufactured horn of this design, and it was to become a trademark for the rest of his life. Such trumpets were made for him by Martin (from 1954), King Musical Instruments (from 1972), and Renold Schilke (from 1982, a gift from Jon Faddis). Gillespie favored mouthpieces made by Al Cass. In December 1986, Gillespie gifted the National Museum of American History his 1972 King "Silver Flair" trumpet with a Cass mouthpiece.

In April 1995, Gillespie's Martin trumpet was auctioned at Christie's in New York City alongside instruments used by Coleman Hawkins, Jimi Hendrix, and Elvis Presley. An image of Gillespie's trumpet was selected for the cover of the auction program. The battered instrument was sold to Manhattan builder Jeffery Brown for $63,000, the proceeds benefiting jazz musicians with cancer.

== Awards and honors ==
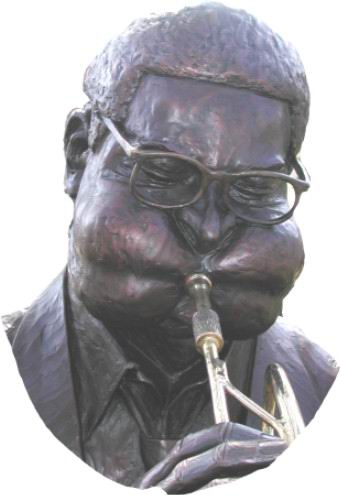
Statue of Gillespie, by Ed Dwight, in his hometown of Cheraw, South Carolina

In 1989, Gillespie received the Grammy Lifetime Achievement Award. The next year, at the Kennedy Center ceremonies celebrating the centennial of American jazz, Gillespie was awarded the Kennedy Center Honors and the American Society of Composers, Authors, and Publishers (ASCAP) Duke Ellington Award for 50 years of achievement as a composer, performer, and bandleader.

In 1989, Gillespie was awarded with an honorary doctorate of music from Berklee College of Music.

In 1991, Gillespie received the Golden Plate Award of the American Academy of Achievement, presented by Awards Council member Wynton Marsalis.

In 1993, he received the Polar Music Prize in Sweden. In 2002, he was posthumously inducted into the International Latin Music Hall of Fame for his contributions to Afro-Cuban music. He was honored on December 31, 2006, in "A Jazz New Year's Eve: Freddy Cole & the Dizzy Gillespie All-Star Big Band" at the Kennedy Center. In 2014, Gillespie was inducted into the New Jersey Hall of Fame.

== In popular culture ==
Samuel E. Wright played Dizzy Gillespie in the film Bird (1988), about Charlie Parker. Kevin Hanchard portrayed Gillespie in the Chet Baker biopic Born to Be Blue (2015). Charles S. Dutton played him in For Love or Country: The Arturo Sandoval Story (2000).
