= Jousts (album) =

Studio album by Oscar Peterson and the Trumpet Kings
- Released: 1978
- Recorded: 1974–1975
- Genre: Jazz
- Length: 48:26
- Label: Pablo
- Producer: Norman Granz

Oscar Peterson and the Trumpet Kings chronology
Oscar Peterson and Dizzy Gillespie (1974)	Jousts (1978)	Satch and Josh (1974)

Dizzy Gillespie chronology
Oscar Peterson and Dizzy Gillespie (1974)	Oscar Peterson and the Trumpet Kings - Jousts (1974)	The Bop Session (1975)

Professional ratings
Review scores
Source	Rating
AllMusic	4/5 stars
DownBeat	4.5/5 stars

Jousts is a 1978 album by Oscar Peterson and the Trumpet Kings, consisting of duets with the trumpeters Harry "Sweets" Edison, Jon Faddis, Clark Terry, Roy Eldridge and Dizzy Gillespie. Peterson had recently recorded individual albums with each of the trumpeters, released as Oscar Peterson and Dizzy Gillespie (1974), Oscar Peterson and Roy Eldridge (1974), Oscar Peterson and Harry Edison (1974), Oscar Peterson and Clark Terry (1975), and Oscar Peterson and Jon Faddis (1975).

== Track listing ==
1. "Danish Pastry" (Oscar Peterson, Clark Terry) – 5:53
2. "Crazy Rhythm" (Irving Caesar, Roger Wolfe Kahn, Joseph Meyer) – 5:34
3. "Stella by Starlight" (Ned Washington, Victor Young) – 5:58
4. "Satin Doll" (Duke Ellington, Johnny Mercer, Billy Strayhorn) – 5:33
5. "Oakland Blues" (Jon Faddis, Peterson) – 8:10
6. "There Is No Greater Love" (Marty Symes, Isham Jones) – 4:47
7. "Caravan" (Duke Ellington, Irving Mills, Juan Tizol) – 3:48
8. "Makin' Whoopee" (Walter Donaldson, Gus Kahn) – 4:39
9. "Trust in Me" (Milton Ager, Arthur Schwartz, Ned Wever) – 4:04

== Personnel ==
=== Performance ===
- Oscar Peterson – piano and organ
- Roy Eldridge – trumpet (tracks 2, 7)
- Harry "Sweets" Edison – trumpet (tracks 4, 8)
- Dizzy Gillespie – trumpet (tracks 3, 6)
- Jon Faddis – trumpet (track 5)
- Clark Terry – trumpet (tracks 1, 9)
