= Teddy Brannon =

American musician (1916–1989)

Humphrey "Teddy" Brannon (September 27, 1916, Moultrie, Georgia – February 24, 1989, Newark, New Jersey) was an American jazz and blues pianist.

Brannon began on piano at age nine. He played in dance bands in high school and worked locally in nightclubs in Newark from 1937 to 1942. From November 1942 to early 1944 he toured and recorded with Benny Carter. He recorded with Roy Eldridge in 1944.

From the mid-1940s to 1950, Brannon led his own groups in New York, while performing as a sideman at sessions led by Rubberlegs Williams (1945), with whom he recorded "Bring It On Home," featuring an 18-year old Miles Davis on trumpet, Don Byas (1946), and Dinah Washington (1947–8). Washington recorded several songs with the Teddy Brannon Quartet, including "Stairway to the Stars," "I Love You, Yes I Do," and "I Wish I Knew the Name of the Boy."

In the 1950s and 1960s Brannon worked in the studios with doo wop groups and played extensively in jazz idioms, including with Don Byas, again with Roy Eldridge (recording in 1951), Buddy Rich, Bennie Green (recording in 1951), Johnny Hodges, Illinois Jacquet and recorded with Tab Smith. He also accompanied singers such as Ruth Brown, Billie Holiday, Babs Gonzales (Brannon's cousin). During the 1950s and 1960s, he also was a member of the Grammy Award-winning Jonah Jones Quartet, and appeared with them on the 1958 television special "An Evening with Fred Astaire" and the 1959 special "Another Evening with Fred Astaire."

== Discography ==
With Jonah Jones

- Swingin' Round the World (Capitol, 1959)
- Jumpin' with a Shuffle (Capitol, 1961)
- The Unsinkable Jonah Jones Swings the Unsinkable Molly Brown (Capitol, 1961)
- Great Instrumental Hits Styled by Jonah Jones (Capitol, 1961)

With Roy Eldridge

- Rockin' Chair (Clef, 1951)
