= The Lionel Hampton Quintet =

Studio album by Lionel Hampton
- Released: 1954
- Recorded: April 12–13, 1954 at Fine Sound, New York City
- Genre: Jazz
- Label: Clef - MGC 628
- Producer: Norman Granz

Lionel Hampton chronology
Crazy Hamp (1954)	The Lionel Hampton Quintet (1954)	The Lionel Hampton Art Tatum Buddy Rich Trio (1955)

The Lionel Hampton Quintet is a 1954 album by Lionel Hampton accompanied by a quintet including clarinetist Buddy DeFranco.

The album was reissued by Verve Records in 1999, with four extra tracks.

== Reception ==
Professional ratings
Review scores
Source	Rating
Allmusic	4/5 stars
The Penguin Guide to Jazz Recordings	3.5/4 stars

Scott Yanow reviewed the album for Allmusic and wrote that "...Hampton is typically exuberant throughout (grunting rather loudly during a few later ensemble choruses on "Flying Home"), DeFranco and Peterson are as swinging as usual, and the overall music is quite joyous. Even if "Flying Home" does not reach Granz's claim of being the best-ever version of the song (one misses the honking tenor and screaming trumpet), this is an excellent and rather spontaneous outing."

== Track listing ==
1. "Flying Home" (Benny Goodman, Lionel Hampton, Sydney Robin) - 17:11
2. "Je Ne Sais Pas" (Hampton) - 6:33
3. "On the Sunny Side of the Street" (Dorothy Fields, Jimmy McHugh) - 5:52
4. "April in Paris" (Vernon Duke, E.Y. "Yip" Harburg) - 6:25

Bonus tracks; Issued on the 1999 Verve CD Reissue, Verve 314-589-100-2

5. "Don't Be That Way" (Goodman, Mitchell Parish, Edgar Sampson) - 9:28
6. "These Foolish Things" (Harry Link, Holt Marvell, Jack Strachey) - 8:36
7. "The Way You Look Tonight" (Fields, Jerome Kern) - 11:14
8. "It's Only a Paper Moon" (Harold Arlen, Harburg, Billy Rose) - 6:48

== Personnel ==
- Lionel Hampton - vibraphone
- Buddy DeFranco - clarinet
- Oscar Peterson - piano
- Ray Brown - double bass
- Buddy Rich - drums

Production

- David Stone Martin - cover illustration
- Norman Granz - producer
