= I'm Coming Virginia =

1926 song by Donald Heywood and Will Cook

"I'm Coming Virginia" is a song composed in 1926 by Donald Heywood with lyrics by Will Marion Cook. It is often wrongly attributed to vocalist Ethel Waters, who first recorded it on September 18, 1926, with Will Marion Cook's Singing Orchestra. Waters is credited with popularizing it. Cornetist Bix Beiderbecke, pianist Fats Waller (with Fletcher Henderson) and the Paul Whiteman Orchestra featuring Bing Crosby all recorded it in 1927. The song has become a jazz standard performed by Dixieland musicians.

== History ==
Ethel Waters first recorded it for Columbia Records on September 18, 1926 and she identified Heywood and Cook as the authors in her autobiography. The following year, Waters first sang it during her Broadway premiere in a production of Africana at Daly's Sixty-third Street Theatre.

After the Waters release, the tune was adopted by numerous Dixieland groups, who increased the tempo. Cornetist Bix Beiderbecke recorded the song in 1927 with Frankie Trumbauer, and it was subsequently widely recorded in the late 1920s and 1930s by artists such as Fats Waller (with the Fletcher Henderson Orchestra in New York on 11 May 1927), Bing Crosby with the Paul Whiteman Orchestra on April 29, 1927 in one of Crosby's earliest recordings, Django Reinhardt, Artie Shaw, Art Tatum (The Genius of Art Tatum, 1953), Maxine Sullivan, Sidney Bechet, and Louis Armstrong. Teddy Wilson recorded the song in 1937. In 1938, Benny Goodman featured it in his Carnegie Hall concert of that year. Paul Whiteman re-recorded the song, and had a second hit with it in December. In following decades, it was recorded by Erroll Garner, Gene Krupa, Al Cohn, and Steve Lacy. Billie Holiday adopted the tune, and performed it "Chicago style". The song remains a staple of Dixieland musicians.

Jimmy Rushing also recorded "I'm Coming Virginia" with his big band in 1958. In 1974, guitarist Charlie Byrd performed a rendition of the tune at the Concerts by the Sea in Redondo Beach, California, which appeared on his Byrd by the Sea album. Billboard praised the sensitivity and delicate nature of the album recording. Violinist Stephane Grappelli recorded it with George Shearing for their 1976 album The Reunion. In 2000, bassist Michael Moore's trio recorded it for the History of Jazz, Vol. 1 compilation.

== Structure ==
Alec Wilder says of the song in American Popular Song: The Great Innovators, 1900-1950:

In 1927, 'I'm Coming Virginia,' with music by Donald Heywood was another lively rhythm song. The main strain is a series of strong rhythmic imitative phrases which establish the swinging character of the song, but I find the release and its continuous motion into a variant of the A sections the most interesting. I shouldn't have said 'A sections' since the first section, though it repeats the first phrase of the song, then moves away and almost immediately into what I suppose should be called 'the release.' It's a twenty-four measure song, and the only feeling of stopping and starting up again (too often the awkwardness of pop songs) is in the seventh-measure cadence. But even this, due to adroit use of harmony, conveys continuous motion. It's an unusual and a very good song.

The song features lyrics such as "And if I can win ya, I'll never more roam, I'm coming Virginia, My Dixieland home."
