= Roy's Got Rhythm =

Studio album by Roy Eldridge
- Released: 1956
- Recorded: January 20, 22 & 29, 1951; Stockholm, Sweden
- Genre: Jazz
- Label: EmArcy; MG 36084

Roy Eldridge chronology
Roy Eldridge in Paris (1950)	Roy's Got Rhythm (1956)	Rockin' Chair (1951)

Roy's Got Rhythm is an album by American jazz trumpeter Roy Eldridge featuring tracks recorded in Sweden in 1951 and released on the EmArcy label. The album was originally recorded for the Swedish label Metronome, and some cuts were also released on Prestige Records.

== Reception ==
Professional ratings
Review scores
Source	Rating
Allmusic	4/5 stars

Allmusic awarded the album 4 stars with its review by Scott Yanow stating: "Between his Paris sessions of 1950 and 1951 for Vogue, trumpeter Roy Eldridge traveled to Sweden and recorded nine spirited selections for Metronome which were reissued on this EmArcy LP. None of Eldridge's sidemen (except for clarinetist Ove Lind who is just on two songs) gained much of a reputation outside of Sweden, but they fare well during these fairly basic performances which are based in swing but also influenced a little by early rhythm & blues".

== Track listing ==
All compositions by Roy Eldridge except as indicated

1. "Scotty" (George Duvivier) – 3:02
2. "No Rolling Blues" (John Collins) – 3:06
3. "The Heat's On" – 3:02
4. "Saturday Nite Fish Fry Part 1" (Louis Jordan, Ellis Walsh) – 2:24
5. "Saturday Nite Fish Fry Part 2" (Jordon, Walsh) – 2:34
6. "Hoppin' John" (Collins) – 3:09
7. "They Raided the Joint" – 3:15
8. "School Days" (Will Cobb, Gus Edwards) – 2:58
9. "Echos of Harlem" (Duke Ellington) – 2:47
10. "Roy's Got Rhythm" – 3:26
- Recorded in Stockholm, Sweden on January 20 (3–5, 8 & 9), January 22 (tracks 2, 7 & 10) and January 29 (tracks 1 & 6), 1951

== Personnel ==
- Roy Eldridge – trumpet, vocals
- Leppe Sundevall – bass trumpet (tracks 3–5 & 8)
- Ove Lind – clarinet (tracks 1 & 6)
- Carl-Henrik Norin – tenor saxophone (tracks 3–5 & 8)
- Rolf Berg – guitar (tracks 1 & 6)
- Charles Norman – piano, harpsichord
- Gunnar Almstedt (tracks 1 & 6), Thore Jederby (tracks 2–5 & 7–10) – bass
- Anders Burman – drums
