= The Genius of Art Tatum =

Album by Art Tatum

The Genius of Art Tatum is a 1953–54 series of solo albums by jazz pianist Art Tatum originally issued on LP over 11 volumes. First released on the Clef Records label, they were added to the Grammy Hall of Fame in 1978. A 7-CD box-set of these recordings, now under the title of The Complete Pablo Solo Masterpieces, was issued on the Pablo label in July 1991.

== Volumes ==
=== Volume 1 ===
1. "Can't We Be Friends"
2. "Elegy" – 3:36
3. "This Can't Be Love" – 2:37
4. "Blues in My Heart"
5. "Dixieland Band" – 3:07
6. "Humoresque"
7. "Begin The Beguine" – 2:58
8. "Judy"

=== Volume 2 ===
1. "Memories of You" – 5:00
2. "Over the Rainbow" – 3:42
3. "Body and Soul" – 5:49
4. "Makin' Whoopee" – 2:47
5. "Mighty Like a Rose" – 6:07

=== Volume 3 ===
1. "Louise" – 4:58
2. "Love for Sale"
3. "I'm Coming Virginia"/"Wrap Your Troubles in Dreams"
4. "Embraceable You"
5. "Come Rain or Come Shine" – 5:06

=== Volume 4 ===
1. "Just A-Sittin' and A-Rockin'"
2. "There Will Never Be Another You"
3. "Tenderly"
4. "What Does It Take"
5. "You Took Advantage of Me"
6. "I've Got the World on a String"
7. "Yesterdays" – 3:27

=== Volume 5 ===
1. "Have You Met Miss Jones?" – 4:49
2. "In a Sentimental Mood" – 6:02
3. "Isn't This a Lovely Day?"
4. "Without a Song" – 5:47
5. "Stompin' at the Savoy"
6. "My Last Affair"
7. "Taboo" – 2:50

=== Volume 6 ===
1. "September Song"
2. "Stars Fell on Alabama"
3. "Blue Moon" – 4:59
4. "Mighty Like a Rose" – 6:07
5. "Stars Fell on Alabama"
6. "Blue Moon"

=== Volume 7 ===
1. "I Don't Stand a Ghost of a Chance With You"
2. "The Very Thought of You"
3. "Someone to Watch Over Me"
4. "Stardust"
5. "Where or When"
6. "Stay as Sweet as You Are"
7. "I'll See You Again"

=== Volume 8 ===
1. "I Cover the Waterfront"
2. "Fine and Dandy"
3. "All the Things You Are"
4. "I'm in the Mood for Love"/"When a Woman Loves a Man"
5. "Willow Weep for Me"
6. "Ain't Misbehavin'"

=== Volume 9 ===
1. "Lover, Come Back to Me"
2. "I'll See You in My Dreams"
3. "Ill Wind"
4. "Blue Skies"
5. "Would You Like to Take a Walk?"
6. "I've Got a Crush on You"
7. "Japanese Sandman"
8. "Aunt Hagar's Blues"

=== Volume 10 ===
1. "Caravan"
2. "Too Marvelous for Words"
3. "Just Like a Butterfly (That's Caught in the Rain)"
4. "Gone With the Wind"
5. "Danny Boy"
6. "They Can't Take That Away from Me"
7. "Tea for Two"
8. "It's the Talk of the Town"
9. "Blue Lou"

=== Volume 11 ===
1. "There's a Small Hotel"
2. "The Way You Look Tonight"
3. "You Go to My Head"
4. "Cherokee"
5. "These Foolish Things"
6. "After You've Gone"
