= Ethel Waters =

American vocalist and actress (1896–1977)

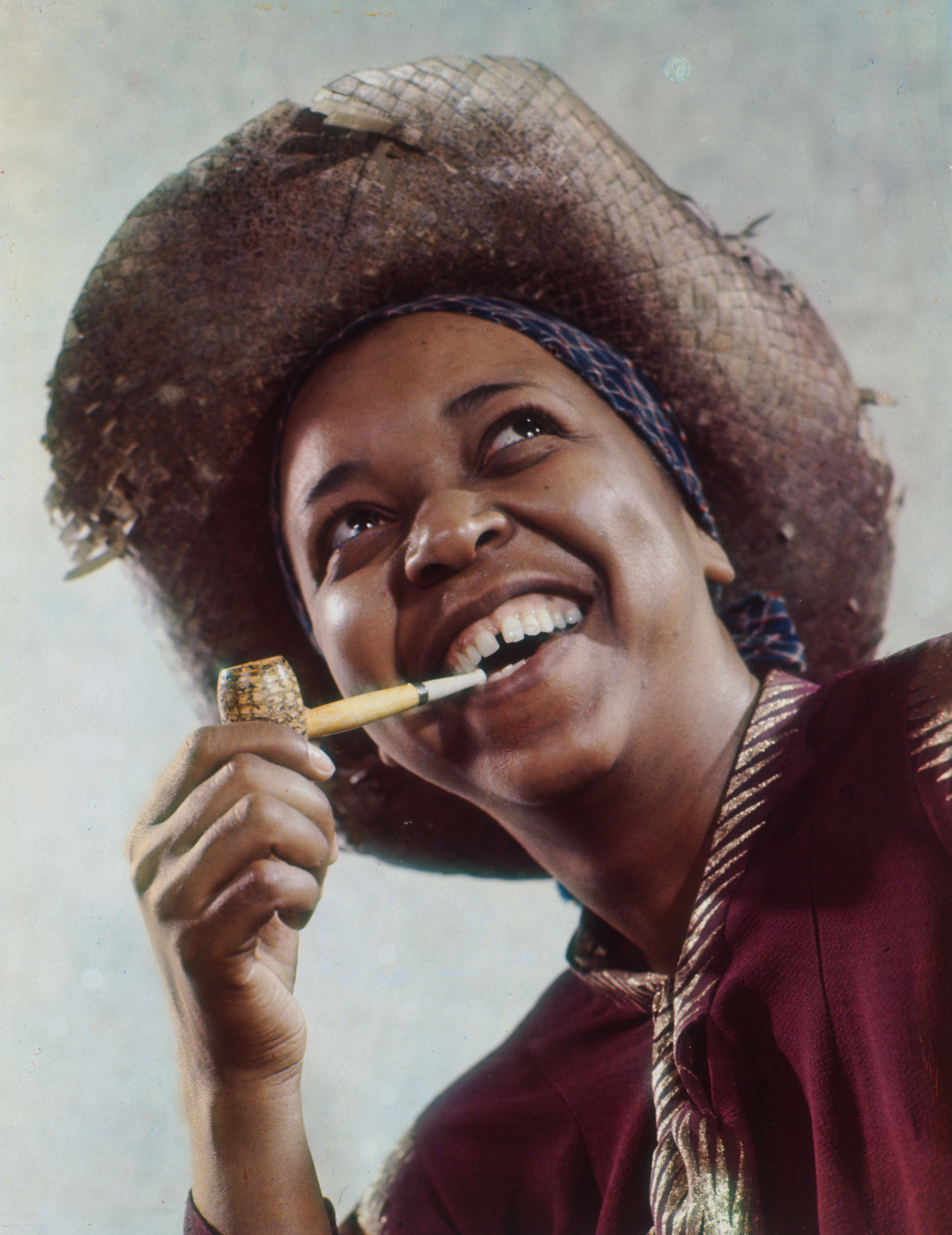
- Waters in costume in 1939
- Born: October 31, 1896; Chester, Pennsylvania, U.S.
- Died: September 1, 1977 (aged 80); Chatsworth, California, U.S.
- Resting place: Forest Lawn Memorial Park, Glendale, California, U.S.
- Other names: Ethel Howard; Sweet Mama Stringbean
- Occupations: Actress; singer
- Years active: 1917–1977
- Spouse(s): Merritt Purnsley (m. 1910; div. 1913) Clyde E. Matthews (m. 1929; div. 1933) Edward Mallory (m. 1938; div. 1945)
- Relatives: Crystal Waters (great-niece)
- Musical career
- Genres: Jazz; Gospel; Blues
- Instrument: Vocals
- Labels: Cardinal; Black Swan; Columbia; Brunswick; Decca; Liberty Music Shop; Word

Ethel Waters (October 31, 1896 – September 1, 1977) was an American singer and actress. Waters frequently performed jazz, swing, and pop music on the Broadway stage and in concerts. She began her career in the 1920s, by singing blues. Her notable recordings include "Dinah", "Stormy Weather", "Taking a Chance on Love", "Chlo-e (Song of the Swamp), "Heat Wave", "Supper Time", "Am I Blue?", "Birmingham Bertha", "Cabin in the Sky", "I'm Coming Virginia", and her version of "His Eye Is on the Sparrow". Waters was the second African American to be nominated for an Academy Award, the first African American to star on her own television show, and the first African-American woman to be nominated for a Primetime Emmy Award.

== Early life ==
Ethel Waters was born in Chester, Pennsylvania, on October 31, 1896 (some sources incorrectly state her birth year as 1900) to African-American mother Louise Anderson (1881–1962). Her birth was the result of the rape of teenaged Louise Anderson by 17-year-old John Wesley (a.k.a. Wesley John) Waters (1878–1901), a pianist and family acquaintance from a middle-class African-American background. Waters' family was very fair-skinned, his mother in particular. Waters played no role in raising his daughter. Many sources, including Ethel herself, reported for years that her mother was 12 or 13 years old at the time of the rape, and 13 when Ethel was born. Stephen Bourne opens his 2007 biography, Ethel Waters: Stormy Weather, with the statement that genealogical research has shown that Louise Anderson may have been 15 or 16 years old.

Soon after Waters was born, her mother married Norman Howard, a railroad worker, with whom she had a daughter, Juanita Howard, Ethel's half-sister. Ethel used the surname Howard as a child and then reverted to using the surname Waters. She was raised in poverty by Sally Anderson, her grandmother, who worked as a housemaid, and with two of her aunts and an uncle. Waters never lived in the same place for more than 15 months. Of her difficult childhood, she said "I never was a child. I never was cuddled, liked, or understood by my family."

Waters grew tall, standing 5 feet 9.5 inches (1.765 m) in her teens. According to jazz historian and archivist Rosetta Reitz, Waters's birth in the North and her peripatetic life exposed her to many cultures. Waters first married in 1910 at the age of 13, but her husband was abusive, and she soon left the marriage and became a maid in a Philadelphia hotel, working for $4.75 per week. On her 17th birthday, she attended a costume party at a nightclub on Juniper Street. She was persuaded to sing two songs and impressed the audience so much that she was offered professional work at the Lincoln Theatre in Baltimore. The job singing and dancing in Baltimore netted her $9 a week, with two of her friends weekly skimming $16 for getting her the job.

== Career ==
=== Singing ===
After her start in Baltimore, Waters toured on the black vaudeville circuit, in her words "from nine until unconscious." Despite her early success, she fell on hard times and joined a carnival traveling in freight cars headed for Chicago. She enjoyed her time with the carnival and recalled, "the roustabouts and the concessionaires were the kind of people I'd grown up with, rough, tough, full of larceny towards strangers, but sentimental and loyal to their friends and co-workers." But she did not last long with them and soon headed south to Atlanta, where she worked in the same club as Bessie Smith. Smith demanded that Waters not compete in singing blues opposite her. Waters conceded and sang ballads and popular songs. Around 1919, Waters moved to Harlem and became a performer in the Harlem Renaissance of the 1920s.

Her first Harlem job was at Edmond's Cellar, a club with a black patronage that specialized in popular ballads. She acted in a blackface comedy, Hello 1919. Jazz historian Rosetta Reitz pointed out that by the time Waters returned to Harlem in 1921, women blues singers were among the most powerful entertainers in the country. In 1921, Waters became the fifth black woman to make a record, for tiny Cardinal Records. She later joined Black Swan, where Fletcher Henderson was her accompanist. Waters later commented that Henderson tended to perform in a more classical style than she preferred, often lacking "the damn-it-to-hell bass."

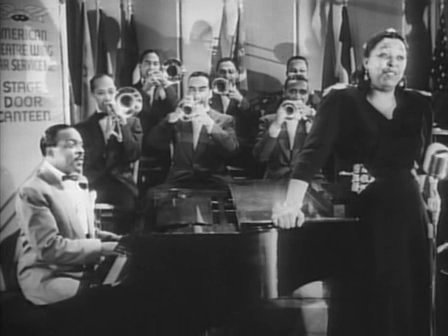
Waters performs with Count Basie in Stage Door Canteen (1943)

She recorded for Black Swan from 1921 through 1923. Her contract with Harry Pace made her the highest paid black recording artist at the time. In early 1924, Paramount bought Black Swan, and she stayed with Paramount through the year.

Around that time, Waters was approached by Maury Greenwald for the London run of Plantation Days, although she later joined the company on its return to Chicago in August 1923, as an "extra added attraction" to "save the fast-flopping revue".

She started working with Pearl Wright, and they toured in the South. In 1924, Waters played at the Plantation Club on Broadway. She also toured with the Black Swan Dance Masters.

She first recorded for Columbia in 1925, achieving a hit with "Dinah".

With Earl Dancer, she joined what was called the "white time" Keith Vaudeville Circuit, a vaudeville circuit performing for white audiences and combined with screenings of silent movies. They received rave reviews in Chicago and earned the unheard-of salary of US$1,250 in 1928. In September 1926, Waters recorded "I'm Coming Virginia", composed by Donald Heywood with lyrics by Will Marion Cook. She is often wrongly attributed as the author. The following year, Waters sang it in a production of Africana at Broadway's Daly's Sixty-Third Street Theatre. In 1929, Waters and Wright arranged the unreleased Harry Akst song "Am I Blue?", which was used in the movie On with the Show and became a hit and her signature song.

=== Film, theater and television ===
In 1933, Waters appeared in a satirical all-black film, Rufus Jones for President, which featured the child performer Sammy Davis Jr. as Rufus Jones.

She went on to star at the Cotton Club, where, according to her autobiography, she "sang 'Stormy Weather' from the depths of the private hell in which I was being crushed and suffocated." In 1933, she had a featured role in the successful Irving Berlin Broadway musical revue As Thousands Cheer with Clifton Webb, Marilyn Miller, and Helen Broderick. She became the first black woman to integrate Broadway's theater district more than a decade after actor Charles Gilpin's critically acclaimed performances in the plays of Eugene O'Neill beginning with The Emperor Jones in 1920.

Waters held three jobs: in As Thousands Cheer, as a singer for Jack Denny & His Orchestra on a national radio program, and in nightclubs. She became one of the highest-paid performers on Broadway. Despite this status, she had difficulty finding work. She moved to Los Angeles to appear in the 1942 film Cairo. During the same year, she reprised her starring stage role as Petunia in the all-black film musical Cabin in the Sky directed by Vincente Minnelli, and starring Lena Horne as the ingénue. Conflicts arose when Minnelli swapped songs from the original script between Waters and Horne: Waters wanted to perform "Honey in the Honeycomb" as a ballad, but Horne wanted to dance to it. Horne broke her ankle and the songs were reversed. She got the ballad and Waters the dance. Waters sang the Academy Award-nominated "Happiness is Just a Thing Called Joe".

In 1939, Waters became the first African American to star in her own television show: The Ethel Waters Show, a variety special, appeared on NBC's New York station on June 14, 1939. It included a dramatic performance of the Broadway play Mamba's Daughters, based on the Gullah community of South Carolina and produced with her in mind. The play was based on the novel by DuBose Heyward.

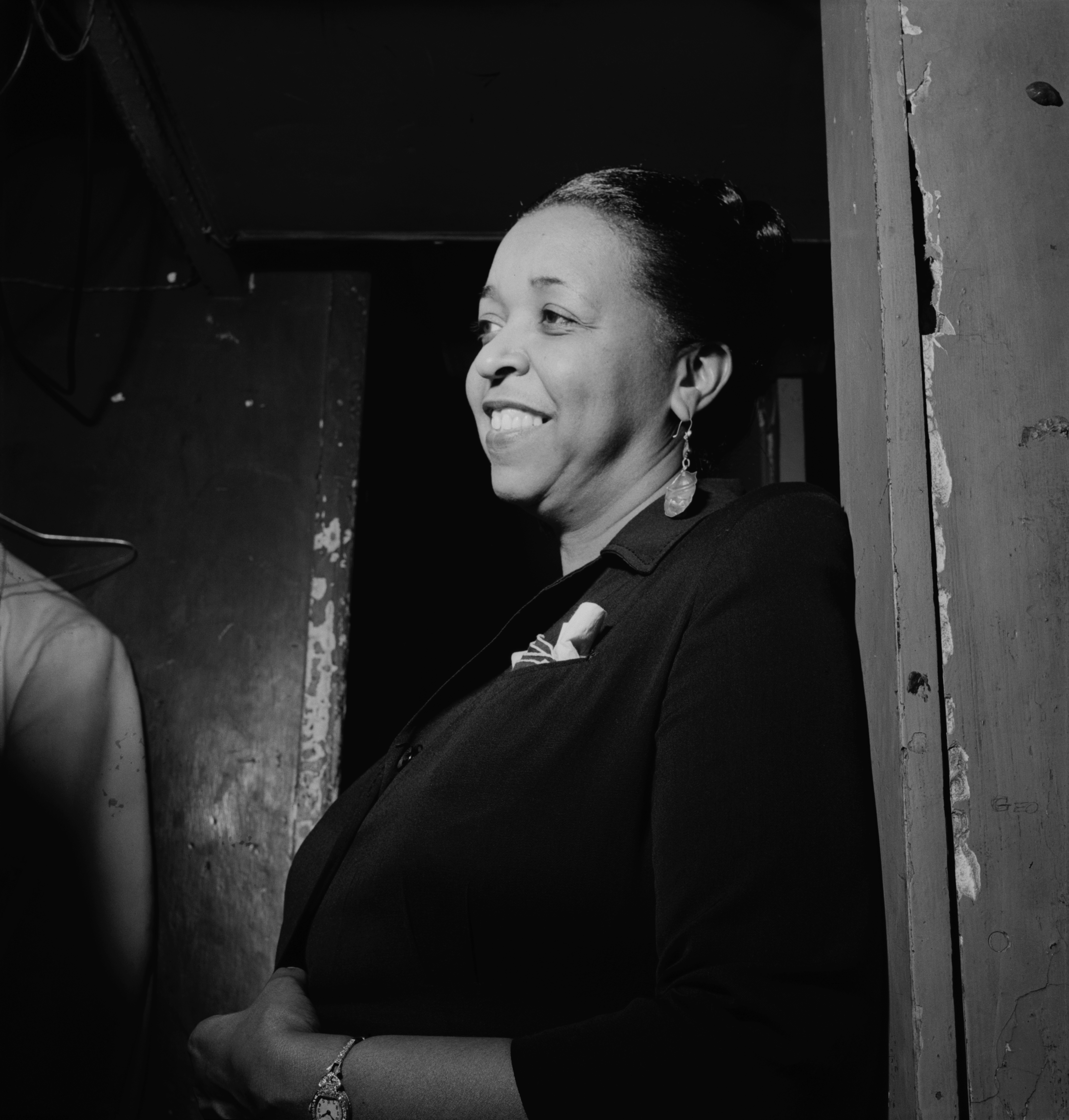
Waters c. 1945

Waters was nominated for an Academy Award for Best Supporting Actress for the film Pinky (1949) under the direction of Elia Kazan after the first director, John Ford, quit over disagreements with Waters. According to producer Darryl F. Zanuck, Ford "hated that old...woman (Waters)." Ford, Kazan stated, "didn't know how to reach Ethel Waters." Kazan later referred to Waters's "truly odd combination of old-time religiosity and free-flowing hatred."

In 1950, she won the New York Drama Critics Circle Award for her performance opposite Julie Harris in the play The Member of the Wedding. Waters and Harris repeated their roles in the 1952 film version.

In 1950, Waters was the first African-American actress to star in a television series, Beulah, which aired on ABC television from 1950 through 1952. It was the first nationally broadcast weekly television series starring an African American in the leading role. She starred as Beulah for the first year of the TV series before quitting in 1951, complaining that the portrayal of blacks was "degrading." She was replaced by Louise Beavers in the second and third season. She guest-starred in 1957 and 1959 on NBC's The Ford Show, Starring Tennessee Ernie Ford. In a 1957 segment, she sang "Cabin in the Sky".

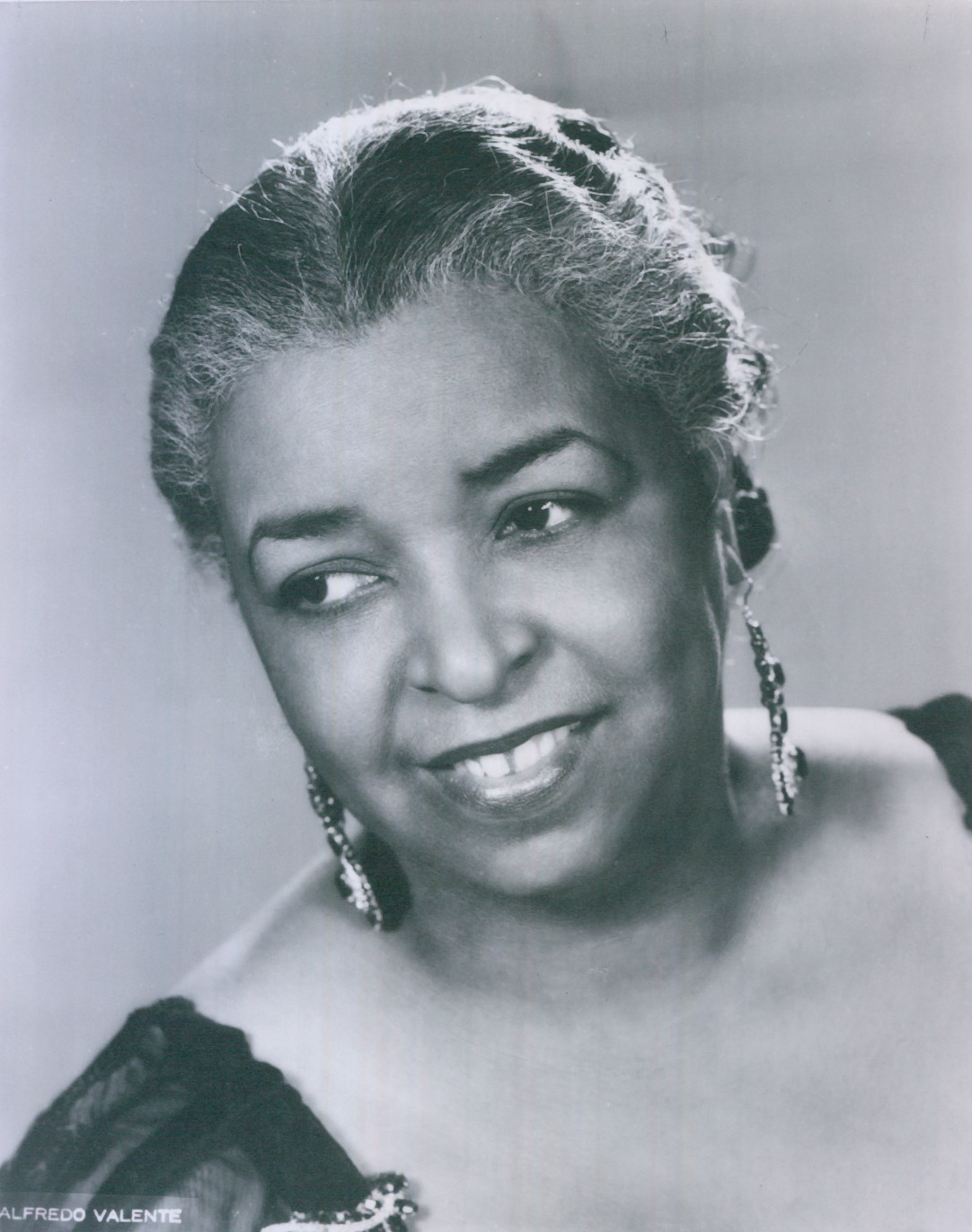
Waters in 1957

== Personal life ==
Her first autobiography, His Eye Is on the Sparrow, (1951), written with Charles Samuels, was adapted for the stage by Larry Parr and premiered on October 7, 2005.

In 1953, she appeared in a Broadway show, At Home With Ethel Waters that opened on September 22, 1953, and closed October 10 after 23 performances.

Waters married three times and had no children. When she was 13, she married Merritt "Buddy" Purnsley in 1909; they divorced in 1913. She married Clyde Edwards Matthews in 1929, and they divorced in 1933. She married Edward Mallory in 1938; they divorced in 1945. Waters was the great-aunt of the singer-songwriter Crystal Waters. Waters may have also been married briefly to Earl Dancer in 1927.

According to the National Museum of African American History and Culture, Waters identified as bisexual early in her career, though she never spoke publicly about her sexuality, and had a large gay and lesbian following that included photographer Carl Van Vechten. During the early 1920s, she reportedly lived in Harlem with dancer Ethel Williams, identified by several historical retrospectives as her romantic partner. This residence has been documented by the NYC LGBT Historic Sites Project, who write that Waters was "well known in Harlem's lesbian circles" and that she and Williams were known to lesbian activist Mabel Hampton as "the two Ethels". Singer Elisabeth Welch gave a similar account to British lesbian magazine Diva in 1997.

In 1938, Waters met artist Luigi Lucioni through their mutual friend, Carl Van Vechten. Lucioni asked Waters if he could paint her portrait, and a sitting was arranged at his studio at 64 Washington Square South. Waters bought the finished portrait from Lucioni in 1939 for $500. She was at the height of her career and the first African American to have a starring role on Broadway. In her portrait, she wore a tailored red dress with a mink coat draped over the back of her chair. Lucioni positioned Waters with her arms tightly wrapped around her waist, a gesture that conveyed vulnerability, as if she were trying to protect herself. The painting was considered lost because it had not been seen in public since 1942. Huntsville (Alabama) Museum of Art Executive Director Christopher J. Madkour and historian Stuart Embury traced it to a private residence. The owner considered Waters to be "an adopted grandmother" but she allowed the Huntsville Museum of Art to display Portrait of Ethel Waters in the 2016 exhibition American Romantic: The Art of Luigi Lucioni where it was viewed by the public for the first time in more than 70 years. The museum acquired Portrait of Ethel Waters in 2017, and it was shown in an exhibition in February 2018.

A turning point came in 1957 when she attended the Billy Graham Crusade in Madison Square Garden. Years later, she gave this testimony of that night: "In 1957, I, Ethel Waters, a 380-pound decrepit old lady, rededicated my life to Jesus Christ, and boy, because He lives, just look at me now. I tell you because He lives; and because my precious child, Billy, gave me the opportunity to stand there, I can thank God for the chance to tell you His eye is on all of us sparrows." In her later years, Waters often toured with the preacher Billy Graham on his crusades. She was a baptized Catholic and considered herself a member of that religion throughout her life.

Waters died on September 1, 1977, aged 80, from uterine cancer, kidney failure, and other ailments, in Chatsworth, California. She is buried at Forest Lawn Memorial Park (Glendale). Waters had given a collection of her papers, recordings, and personal effects to her friend Joan Croomes, which were later placed at the Harry Ransom Center where they are now available for research.

Ethel was written and performed by Terry Burrell as a one-woman tribute to Waters. It ran as a limited engagement in February and March 2012.

== Awards and honors ==
- Her recording of "Stormy Weather" (1933) was listed in the National Recording Registry by the National Recording Preservation Board of the Library of Congress in 2003.
- Gospel Music Hall of Fame, 1983
- Christian Music Hall of Fame, 2007
- Waters was approved for a star on the Hollywood Walk of Fame in 2004; however, the star was never funded or installed.
- In 2015, a historical marker memorializing Waters was unveiled along Route 291 in Chester, Pennsylvania to recognize her life and talents in the city of her birth.
- Commemorative stamp, U.S. Post Office, 1994
- Nomination, Best Supporting Actress, Academy Awards, Pinky 1949
- Nomination, Outstanding Single Performance by an Actress in a Series, Primetime Emmy Awards, for Route 66 "Goodnight Sweet Blues", 1962
- Three recordings by Waters were inducted into the Grammy Hall of Fame, a special Grammy Award established in 1973 to honor recordings that are at least twenty-five years old and have "qualitative or historical significance."

Ethel Waters: Grammy Hall of Fame Awards
Year	Title	Genre	Label	Year inducted
1929	"Am I Blue?"	Traditional Pop (Single)	Columbia	2007
1933	"Stormy Weather" (Keeps Rainin' All The Time)	Jazz (Single)	Brunswick	2003
1925	"Dinah"	Traditional Pop (Single)	Columbia	1998

== Hit records ==
Year	Single	US chart
1921	"Down Home Blues"	5
1921	"There'll Be Some Changes Made"	5
1922	"Spread Yo' Stuff"	7
1922	"Tiger Rag"	14
1923	"Georgia Blues"	10
1925	"Sweet Georgia Brown"	6
1926	"Dinah"	2
1926	"I've Found a New Baby"	11
1926	"Sugar"	9
1927	"I'm Coming, Virginia"	10
1929	"Am I Blue?"	1
1929	"Birmingham Bertha"	20
1929	"True Blue Lou"	15
1931	"Three Little Words"	8
1931	"I Got Rhythm"	17
1931	"You Can't Stop Me from Lovin' You"	13
1931	"Shine On, Harvest Moon"	9
1931	"River, Stay 'Way from My Door"	18
1933	"Stormy Weather"	1
1933	"Don't Blame Me"	6
1933	"Heat Wave"	7
1933	"A Hundred Years from Today"	7
1934	"Come Up and See Me Sometime"	9
1934	"Miss Otis Regrets (She's Unable to Lunch Today)"	19
1938	"You're a Sweetheart"	16

== Filmography ==
=== Features ===
Year	Title	Role	Notes
1929	On with the Show!	Ethel/Birmingham Bertha	
1934	Gift of Gab	Ethel Waters	
1942	Tales of Manhattan	Esther	
1942	Cairo	Cleona Jones	
1943	Cabin in the Sky	Petunia Jackson	
1943	Stage Door Canteen	Ethel Waters	
1949	Pinky	Dicey Johnson	
1952	The Member of the Wedding	Berenice Sadie Brown	
1957	Carib Gold	Mom	
1958	The Heart Is a Rebel	Gladys	
1959	The Sound and the Fury	Dilsey	Last film role

=== Short subjects ===
- Rufus Jones for President (1933) as Mother of Rufus Jones
- Bubbling Over (1934) as Ethel Peabody
- Let My People Live (1939)

=== Television ===
- First African American, male or female, to star in own TV show, The Ethel Waters Show, which was broadcast on NBC on June 14, 1939.
- Starred in title role of Beulah on ABC-TV from 1950 to 1951.
- TV guest appearances from 1950 to 1952 on The Jackie Gleason Show, Texaco Star Theater, This Is Show Business, What's My Line?, and The Chesterfield Supper Club
- Person to Person (1954)
- Whirlybirds, episode "The Big Lie" (1959)
- Route 66, episode "Good Night, Sweet Blues" (1961)
- The Hollywood Palace, hosted by Diana Ross and the Supremes (1969)
- Daniel Boone, episode "Mamma Cooper" (1970)

== Stage appearances ==
- Hello 1919! (1919)
- Jump Steady (1922)
- Plantation Days (1923 re-run of 1922 production)
- Plantation Revue (1925)
- Black Bottom (1926)
- Miss Calico (1926–27)
- Paris Bound (1927)
- Africana (1927)
- The Ethel Waters Broadway Revue (1928)
- Lew Leslie's Blackbirds (1930)
- Rhapsody in Black (1931)
- Broadway to Harlem (1932)
- As Thousands Cheer (1933–34)
- At Home Abroad (1935–36)
- Mamba's Daughters (1939; 1940)
- Cabin in the Sky (1940–41)
- Laugh Time (1943)
- Blue Holiday (1945)
- The Member of the Wedding (1950–51; 1964; 1970)
- At Home with Ethel Waters (1953)
- The Voice of Strangers (1956)

== See also ==
- List of people from Harlem
