= An Evening with Oscar Peterson =

Studio album by Oscar Peterson
- Released: 1957
- Recorded: August 1950; January 19, 1951; February 26, 1952
- Genre: Jazz
- Label: Clef
- Producer: Norman Granz

Oscar Peterson chronology
Oscar Peterson Plays Cole Porter (1952)	An Evening with Oscar Peterson (1957)	Pastel Moods (1952)

Professional ratings
Review scores
Source	Rating
Allmusic	4/5 stars

An Evening with Oscar Peterson is an album by Canadian jazz pianist Oscar Peterson, released in 1952 on Clef Records.

== Track listing ==
1. "Caravan" (Duke Ellington, Irving Mills, Juan Tizol) – 2:52
2. "Summer Nocturne" (Landes) – 3:02
3. "Salute to Garner" (Oscar Peterson) – 2:49
4. "I Get a Kick Out of You" (Cole Porter) – 3:08
5. "What's New?" (Johnny Burke, Bob Haggart) – 3:16
6. "Dark Eyes" (Traditional) – 3:48
7. "What Is It?" (Peterson) – 3:33
8. "The Way You Look Tonight" (Dorothy Fields, Jerome Kern) – 2:58
9. "Minor Blues" (Peterson) – 3:40
10. "Slow Down" (Peterson) – 3:44
11. "How High the Moon" (Nancy Hamilton, Morgan Lewis) – 2:57
12. "The Nearness of You" (Hoagy Carmichael, Ned Washington) – 3:12

== Personnel ==
- Oscar Peterson – piano
- Barney Kessel – guitar
- Ray Brown – double bass
