= Cardinal Records (1920s) =

- Founded: 1920
- Founder: Ethel Waters
- Country of origin: United States
- Location: New York City

Cardinal Records was a jazz record label founded in 1920 in New York that published the first recordings by Ethel Waters. The following year, it began releasing material from the catalogue of Gennett Records.
