= Oscar Peterson and Dizzy Gillespie =

Studio album by Oscar Peterson and Dizzy Gillespie
- Released: 1975
- Recorded: November 28–29, 1974
- Genre: Jazz
- Length: 54:22
- Label: Pablo
- Producer: Norman Granz

Oscar Peterson and Dizzy Gillespie chronology
Oscar Peterson in Russia (1974)	Oscar Peterson and Dizzy Gillespie (1975)	Oscar Peterson and The Trumpet Kings - Jousts (1974)

Dizzy Gillespie chronology
The Trumpet Kings Meet Joe Turner (1974)	Oscar Peterson and Dizzy Gillespie (1974)	Oscar Peterson and The Trumpet Kings - Jousts (1974)

Professional ratings
Review scores
Source	Rating
Allmusic	4.5/5 stars
The Rolling Stone Jazz Record Guide	4/5 stars
The Penguin Guide to Jazz Recordings	3/4 stars

Oscar Peterson and Dizzy Gillespie is an album by Oscar Peterson and Dizzy Gillespie that was released in 1975. The album won the 1976 Downbeat Critics Poll for jazz album of the year and Gillespie won the poll for best trumpet that year. At the Grammy Awards of 1976, Gillespie won the Grammy Award for Best Jazz Performance by a Soloist for his performance on this album.

== Track listing ==
1. "Caravan" (Duke Ellington, Irving Mills, Juan Tizol) – 7:02
2. "Mozambique" (Dizzy Gillespie, Oscar Peterson) – 7:08
3. "Autumn Leaves" (Joseph Kosma, Johnny Mercer, Jacques Prévert) – 7:25
4. "Close Your Eyes" (Bernice Petkere) – 5:26
5. "Blues for Bird" (Gillespie, Peterson) – 12:32
6. "Dizzy Atmosphere" (Gillespie) – 4:55
7. "Alone Together" (Howard Dietz, Arthur Schwartz) – 5:16
8. "Con Alma" (Gillespie) – 5:15

== Personnel ==
- Oscar Peterson – piano
- Dizzy Gillespie – trumpet
