= Little Jazz =

Studio album by Roy Eldridge
- Released: 1955
- Recorded: September 14, 1954; Fine Sound Studios, NYC
- Genre: Jazz
- Label: Clef; MGC 683
- Producer: Norman Granz

Roy Eldridge chronology
Dale's Wail (1954)	Little Jazz (1955)	Roy and Diz (1954)

Little Jazz is an album by American jazz trumpeter Roy Eldridge recorded in 1954 and originally released on the Clef label. "Little Jazz" was Roy Eldridge's nickname.

== Reception ==
Professional ratings
Review scores
Source	Rating
Allmusic	4.5/5 stars

Allmusic awarded the album 4½ stars.

== Track listing ==
1. "A Foggy Day" (George Gershwin, Ira Gershwin) - 5:44
2. "Blue Moon" (Richard Rodgers, Lorenz Hart) - 4:00
3. "Stormy Weather" (Harold Arlen, Ted Koehler) - 4:27
4. "Sweethearts on Parade" (Carmen Lombardo, Charles Newman) - 4:33
5. "If I Had You" (Jimmy Campbell, Reg Connelly, Ted Shapiro) - 3:48
6. "I Only Have Eyes for You" (Harry Warren, Al Dubin) - 7:15
7. "Sweet Georgia Brown" (Ben Bernie, Maceo Pinkard, Kenneth Casey) - 4:32
8. "The Song Is Ended" (Irving Berlin) - 3:35

== Personnel ==
- Roy Eldridge - trumpet
- Oscar Peterson - piano
- Herb Ellis - guitar
- Ray Brown - bass
- Buddy Rich - drums
