= Rockin' Chair (Roy Eldridge album) =

Studio album by Roy Eldridge
- Released: 1955
- Recorded: August and December 1951 and December 13, 1952; New York City
- Genre: Jazz
- Label: Clef; MGC 704
- Producer: Norman Granz

Roy Eldridge chronology
Roy's Got Rhythm (1951)	Rockin' Chair (1955)	Dale's Wail (1953)

Rockin' Chair is an album by American jazz trumpeter Roy Eldridge recorded in 1951 and 1952 and originally released on the Clef label.

== Reception ==
Professional ratings
Review scores
Source	Rating
Allmusic	4.5/5 stars

AllMusic awarded the album 4½ stars.

== Track listing ==
1. "I See Everybody's Baby" (Robert Dade, George Williams) – 2:54
2. "Little Jazz" (Roy Eldridge, Buster Harding) – 2:38
3. "Basin Street Blues" (Spencer Williams) – 2:43
4. "I Remember Harlem" (Eldridge, Bob Astor, Williams) – 3:30
5. "Rockin' Chair" (Hoagy Carmichael) – 3:16
6. "Easter Parade" (Irving Berlin) – 2:50
7. "Roy's Riff" (Eldridge) – 3:09
8. "Wrap Your Troubles in Dreams" (Harry Barris, Ted Koehler, Billy Moll) – 3:21
9. "Baby What's The Matter With You" (Teddy Brannon, Sam Theard) – 3:21
10. "Yard Dog" (Eldridge, Harding) – 2:56
11. "Sweet Lorraine" (Cliff Burwell, Mitchell Parish) – 2:52
12. "Jumbo the Elephant" (Eldridge, Astor) – 2:49
- Recorded in New York City in August 1951 (tracks 9–12), December 1951 (tracks 1, 3, 4 & 6) and on December 13, 1952 (tracks 2, 5, 7 & 8)

== Personnel ==
- Roy Eldridge – trumpet
- Buddy Tate – tenor saxophone (tracks 9–12)
- Teddy Brannon (tracks 9–12), Oscar Peterson (tracks 2, 5, 7 & 8) – piano
- Herb Ellis – guitar (tracks 2, 5, 7 & 8)
- Clyde Lombardi (tracks 9–12), Ray Brown (tracks 2, 5, 7 & 8) – bass
- Charlie Smith (tracks 9–12), J. C. Heard (tracks 2, 5, 7 & 8) – drums
- Unidentified orchestra conducted by George Williams (tracks 1, 3, 4 & 6)
