= The Ethel Waters Show =

1939 television film

The Ethel Waters Show was a one-hour American television variety special that ran in the earliest days of NBC Television, on June 14, 1939, and was hosted by actress and singer Ethel Waters. Waters was the first black performer, male or female, to have her own TV show and may very well have been the first black person to appear on television.

The special was transmitted from the NBC Studios in New York over NBC's New York station W2XBS.

The special included Waters performing a dramatic sequence from her most recent Broadway play Mamba's Daughters, along with two actresses from the production, Georgette Harvey and Fredi Washington. The cast also included Joey Faye and Philip Loeb, performing skits.
