= The Trumpet Kings Meet Joe Turner =

1975 studio album by Joe Turner, Dizzy Gillespie, and others

Studio album by Joe Turner, Dizzy Gillespie, Roy Eldridge, Harry "Sweets" Edison and Clark Terry
- Released: 1975
- Recorded: September 19, 1974; Los Angeles
- Genre: Jazz
- Length: 41:33
- Labels: Pablo; 2310-717
- Producer: Norman Granz

Dizzy Gillespie chronology
Dizzy Gillespie's Big 4 (1974)	The Trumpet Kings Meet Joe Turner (1975)	Oscar Peterson and Dizzy Gillespie (1974)

The Trumpet Kings Meet Joe Turner is an album by vocalist Big Joe Turner with trumpeters Dizzy Gillespie, Roy Eldridge, Harry "Sweets" Edison and Clark Terry, recorded in 1974 and released on the Pablo label.

== Reception ==
Professional ratings
Review scores
Source	Rating
AllMusic	4/5 stars
The Penguin Guide to Jazz Recordings	2.5/4 stars
The Rolling Stone Album Guide	4/5 stars

The AllMusic review by Scott Yanow stated: "It is not a classic outing... but it is colorful and unique enough to be easily recommended to straight-ahead jazz and blues fans."

The authors of The Penguin Guide to Jazz Recordings wrote that the album is typical of the "Trumpet Kings" series, featuring "brilliant flashes of virtuosity interspersed with rhetoric and mere showing-off," but commented that, of the group, "the best is probably the Joe Turner meeting, where the great R&B singer puts everyone through their paces."

Nick Deriso of Something Else! described the album "an amalgamation of so many concurrent joys that it's a wonder this Pablo release ever got made," and remarked: "Together, they sounded new all over again; it was like finding an undiscovered country. Often, the jazzers pushed Turner to fresh rhythmic heights of traditional 12-bar iambic pentameter. But just as typically, his incisive vocal work also inspired gritty, more soulful thoughts from the household-named horn players."

== Track listing ==
All compositions by Joe Turner except as indicated

1. "Mornin', Noon and Night" – 4:13
2. "I Know You Love Me Baby" – 15:48
3. "TV Mama" – 13:57
4. "'Tain't Nobody's Bizness If I Do" (Porter Grainger, Everett Robins) – 7:35

== Personnel ==
- Big Joe Turner – vocals
- Dizzy Gillespie, Roy Eldridge, Harry "Sweets" Edison, Clark Terry – trumpet
- Pee Wee Crayton – guitar
- Jimmy Robins – piano
- Chuck Norris – bass
- Washington Rucker – drums
