= Basie Rides Again! =

Studio album by Count Basie
- Released: 1956
- Recorded: July 26 and December 12 & 13, 1952
- Studio: Fine Sound, New York City
- Genre: Jazz
- Length: 39:39
- Label: Clef; MG C-729
- Producer: Norman Granz

Count Basie chronology
Basie Jazz (1952)	Basie Rides Again! (1956)	Dance Session (1953)

Basie Rides Again! is an album by pianist/bandleader Count Basie recorded in 1952 and originally released on the Clef label in 1956. Selections from this album were previously released on the 1954 Clef LP Basie Jazz.

== Reception ==
Professional ratings
Review scores
Source	Rating
AllMusic	4.5/5 stars

AllMusic awarded the album 4½ stars.

== Track listing ==
1. "Jive at Five" (Count Basie, Harry Edison) - 3:06
2. "Be My Guest" (Ernie Wilkins) - 3:00
3. "No Name" (King Oliver) - 3:06
4. "Blues for the Count and Oscar" (Basie, Oscar Peterson) - 3:04
5. "Redhead" (Oliver) - 2:47
6. "Every Tub" (Basie, Eddie Durham) - 2:47
7. "Goin' to Chicago" (Count Basie) - 3:17
8. "Sent for You Yesterday and Here You Come Today" (Count Basie, Eddie Durham, Jimmy Rushing) - 3:09
9. "Bread" (Wilkins) - 2:49
10. "There's a Small Hotel" (Richard Rodgers, Lorenz Hart) - 3:29
11. "Tippin' on the Q. T." (Buck Clayton) - 3:00
12. "Blee-Blop Blues" (A. K. Salim) - 3:16

Recorded at Fine Sound Studios in New York City on January 25, (tracks 1, 3, 5 & 6), July 22 (tracks 9–12), July 26 (track 2 & 4) and December 12 (tracks 7 & 8), 1952

== Personnel ==
- Count Basie - piano, organ
- Paul Campbell (tracks 1–3 & 5–12), Wendell Culley (tracks 1–3 & 5–12), Reunald Jones (tracks 2 & 7–12), Joe Newman (tracks 1–3 & 5–8), Charlie Shavers (tracks 1, 3, 5 & 6) - trumpet
- Henry Coker (tracks 1–3 & 5–12), Benny Powell (tracks 2, 3 & 5–12), Jimmy Wilkins (tracks 2, 3 & 5–12) - trombone
- Marshall Royal - alto saxophone, clarinet (tracks 2, 3 & 5–12)
- Ernie Wilkins - alto saxophone, tenor saxophone, arranger (tracks 2, 3 & 5–12)
- Eddie "Lockjaw" Davis (tracks 2, 4 & 9–12), Floyd Johnson (tracks 3, 5 & 6), Paul Quinichette (tracks 2 & 4) - tenor saxophone
- Charlie Fowlkes - baritone saxophone (tracks 2, 3 & 5–12)
- Oscar Peterson - piano (tracks 2 & 4)
- Freddie Green - guitar
- Ray Brown (tracks 2 & 4), Jimmy Lewis (tracks 1, 3, 5, 6 & 9–12), Gene Ramey (tracks 7 & 8) - bass
- Gus Johnson (tracks 1–6 & 9–12), Buddy Rich (tracks 7 & 8) - drums
- Al Hibbler - vocals (tracks 7 & 8)
- Buck Clayton (track 11), Neal Hefti (tracks 1 & 6), Sy Oliver (tracks 3 & 5), A. K. Salim (track 12) - arranger
