= Dale's Wail =

Studio album by Roy Eldridge
- Released: 1954
- Recorded: April 20 and December, 1953; New York City and Los Angeles, CA
- Genre: Jazz
- Label: Clef; MGC 705
- Producer: Norman Granz

Roy Eldridge chronology
Rockin' Chair (1952)	Dale's Wail (1954)	Little Jazz (1954)

Dale's Wail is an album by American jazz trumpeter Roy Eldridge recorded in 1953 and originally released on the Clef label.

== Reception ==
Professional ratings
Review scores
Source	Rating
Allmusic	4.5/5 stars

Allmusic awarded the album 4½ stars stating it " features the great swing trumpeter at the peak of his powers".

== Track listing ==
All compositions by Roy Eldridge except as indicated

1. "Dale's Wail" - 3:42
2. "Love for Sale" (Cole Porter) - 3:39
3. "The Man I Love" (George Gershwin, Ira Gershwin) - 3:38
4. "Oscar's Arrangement" - 2:40
5. "Willow Weep for Me" (Ann Ronell) - 3:18
6. "Somebody Loves Me" (George Gershwin, Ballard MacDonald) - 3:30
7. "When Your Lover Has Gone" (Einar Aaron Swan) - 3:06
8. "When It's Sleepy Time Down South" (Clarence Muse, Leon René, Otis René) - 3:02
9. "Feeling a Draft" - 3:29
10. "Don't Blame Me" (Jimmy McHugh, Dorothy Fields) - 3:10
11. "Echoes of Harlem" (Duke Ellington) - 3:59
12. "I Can't Get Started" (Vernon Duke, Ira Gershwin) - 3:21
- Recorded in New York City on April 20, 1953 (tracks 1–4) and in Los Angeles, CA in December 1953 (tracks 5–12)

== Personnel ==
- Roy Eldridge - trumpet
- Oscar Peterson - piano, organ
- Herb Ellis (tracks 5–12), Barney Kessel (tracks 1–4) - guitar
- Ray Brown - bass
- Jo Jones (tracks 1–4), Alvin Stoller (tracks 5–12) - drums
