= Roy and Diz =

Studio album by Roy Eldridge and Dizzy Gillespie
- Released: 1954
- Recorded: October 29, 1954; New York City
- Genre: Jazz
- Length: 74:23
- Label: Clef; MGC 641 and MGC 671
- Producer: Norman Granz

Dizzy Gillespie chronology
Dizzy and Strings (1954)	Roy and Diz (1954)	Jazz Recital (1955)

Roy Eldridge chronology
Little Jazz (1954)	Roy and Diz (1954)	Urbane Jazz (1955)

Roy and Diz Volume 2

Roy and Diz is an album by trumpeters Roy Eldridge and Dizzy Gillespie, recorded in 1954 and originally released on the Clef label as two separate volumes. Selections from these sessions were also released as Trumpet Battle and The Trumpet Kings.

== Reception ==
Professional ratings
Review scores
Source	Rating
AllMusic	3/5 stars
The Penguin Guide to Jazz Recordings	3.5/4 stars
The Rolling Stone Jazz Record Guide	4/5 stars

The Billboard review of the second volume in 1955 stated: "The first Roy–Diz set, provocative as it was, struck many as more of a 'cutting contest' than a collaboration. While the competitive element is not absent in this second set, here this acts as a mutual stimulant." The AllMusic review awarded the album 3 stars.

== Track listing ==
1. "Sometimes I'm Happy" (Irving Caesar, Vincent Youmans) – 5:22
2. "Algo Bueno (Woody 'n' You)" (Dizzy Gillespie) – 6:10
3. "Trumpet Blues" (Roy Eldridge, Gillespie) – 7:54
4. "Ballad Medley – I’m Through with Love/Can't We Be Friends/Don't You Know?/I Don’t Know Why I Love You Like I Do/If I Had You" (Fud Livingston/Paul James, Kay Swift/Bobby Worth/Fred E. Ahlert, Roy Turk/Irving King, Ted Shapiro) – 10:17
5. "Blue Moon" (Lorenz Hart, Richard Rodgers) – 9:04
6. "I've Found a New Baby" (Jack Palmer, Spencer Williams) – 9:14
7. "Pretty Eyed Baby" (Mary Lou Williams, Snub Mosley, William Luther Johnson) – 5:31
8. "I Can't Get Started" (Vernon Duke, Ira Gershwin) – 10:57
9. "Limehouse Blues" (Philip Braham, Douglas Furber) – 9:54

The original LP track order

- Roy & Diz: Tracks 6, 8, 3, 2 & 7
- Roy & Diz #2: Tracks 1, 4, 9 & 5
- Trumpet Battle: Tracks 6, 8, 1 & 4
- The Trumpet Kings: Tracks 3, 2, 7, 9 & 5

== Personnel ==
- Roy Eldridge, Dizzy Gillespie – trumpet, vocals
- Oscar Peterson – piano
- Herb Ellis – guitar
- Ray Brown – bass
- Louis Bellson – drums
