= Clef Records =

- Founded: 1946
- Founder: Norman Granz
- Status: Defunct
- Genre: Jazz
- Country of origin: U.S.

Clef Records was an American jazz record label founded by Norman Granz in 1946. It became part of Verve Records, which Granz created in 1956. Clef recordings were, in the mid 1950s, licensed to Columbia (UK), which issued 78 rpm discs with a special white label and the Clef logo.

== Discography: 600 and 700 12 inch LP Series ==
Catalog	Artist	Album	Notes
MGC 600	Gene Krupa	The Gene Krupa Trio	Norman Granz Jazz at the Philharmonic
MGC 601	Various Artists	Norman Granz' Jam Session #1	Featuring Charlie Shavers, Benny Carter, Charlie Parker, Johnny Hodges, Ben Webster, Flip Phillips, Oscar Peterson, Barney Kessel, Ray Brown and J.C. Heard
MGC 602	Various Artists	Norman Granz' Jam Session #2	Featuring Harry Edison, Benny Carter, Willie Smith, Stan Getz, Wardell Gray, Buddy DeFranco, Count Basie, Freddie Green, John Simmons and Buddy Rich
MGC 603	Oscar Peterson	Oscar Peterson Plays Cole Porter	
MGC 604	Oscar Peterson	Oscar Peterson Plays Irving Berlin	
MGC 605	Oscar Peterson	Oscar Peterson Plays George Gershwin	
MGC 606	Oscar Peterson	Oscar Peterson Plays Duke Ellington	
MGC 607	Gene Krupa	(not released)	
MGC 608	Jazz at the Philharmonic	How High the Moon	
MGC 609	Charlie Parker	Charlie Parker Big Band	
MGC 610	Bud Powell	Bud Powell's Moods	
MGC 611	Lionel Hampton	The Lionel Hampton Quartet	
MGC 612	Art Tatum	The Genius of Art Tatum#1	
MGC 613	Art Tatum	The Genius of Art Tatum#2	
MGC 614	Art Tatum	The Genius of Art Tatum#3	
MGC 615	Art Tatum	The Genius of Art Tatum#4	
MGC 616	not used		
MGC 617	not used		
MGC 618	Art Tatum	The Genius of Art Tatum#5	
MGC 619	not used		
MGC 620	not used		
MGC 621	not used		
MGC 622	Illinois Jacquet	Jazz Moods by Illinois Jacquet	
MGC 623	Oscar Peterson	Oscar Peterson Plays Jerome Kern	
MGC 624	Oscar Peterson	Oscar Peterson Plays Richard Rodgers	
MGC 625	Oscar Peterson	Oscar Peterson Plays Vincent Youmans	
MGC 626	Count Basie	Dance Session	
MGC 627	Gene Krupa and His Orchestra	Sing, Sing, Sing	
MGC 628	Lionel Hampton	The Lionel Hampton Quintet	
MGC 629	not used		
MGC 630	Artie Shaw	Artie Shaw and His Gramercy Five, Vol. 3	
MGC 631	Gene Krupa	The Gene Krupa Sextet	
MGC 632	Meade "Lux" Lewis and Louie Bellson	Meade "Lux" Lewis and Louie Bellson Play Boogie Woogie Piano and Drums	
MGC 633	Count Basie	Basie Jazz	
MGC 634	Flip Phillips and Buddy Rich	The Flip Phillips Buddy Rich Trio	
MGC 635	Phil Moore	Music for Moderns	
MGC 636	not used		
MGC 637	Flip Phillips	The Flip Phillips Quintet	
MGC 638	Charlie Barnet	One Night Stand	
MGC 639	Various Artists	Our Best	
MGC 640	Harry Carney	Harry Carney with Strings	
MGC 641	Roy Eldridge and Dizzy Gillespie	Roy and Diz	
MGC 642	Lionel Hampton	The Lionel Hampton Quintet #2	
MGC 643	Art Tatum, Benny Carter and Louis Bellson	Tatum - Carter - Bellson	
MGC 644	Bob Brookmeyer	Bob Brookmeyer Plays Bob Brookmeyer and Some Others	
MGC 645	Artie Shaw	Artie Shaw and His Gramercy Five, Vol. 4	
MGC 646	Charlie Parker	The Magnificent Charlie Parker	
MGC 647	Count Basie	Dance Session Album #2	
MGC 648	Oscar Peterson	Oscar Peterson Plays Harry Warren	
MGC 649	Oscar Peterson	Oscar Peterson Plays Harold Arlen	
MGC 650	Oscar Peterson	Oscar Peterson Plays Jimmy McHugh	
MGC 651	Various Artists	Norman Granz' Jam Session #1	
MGC 652	Various Artists	Norman Granz' Jam Session #2	
MGC 653	Various Artists	Norman Granz' Jam Session #3	
MGC 654	Various Artists	Norman Granz' Jam Session #4	
MGC 655	Various Artists	Norman Granz' Jam Session #5	
MGC 656	Various Artists	Norman Granz' Jam Session #6	
MGC 657	Art Tatum	The Genius of Art Tatum #6	
MGC 658	Art Tatum	The Genius of Art Tatum #7	
MGC 659	Art Tatum	The Genius of Art Tatum #8	
MGC 660	Art Tatum	The Genius of Art Tatum #9	
MGC 661	Art Tatum	The Genius of Art Tatum #10	
MGC 662	Fred Astaire	The Astaire Story Vol. 1	
MGC 663	Fred Astaire	The Astaire Story Vol. 2	
MGC 664	Fred Astaire	The Astaire Story Vol. 3	
MGC 665	Fred Astaire	The Astaire Story Vol. 4	
MGC 666	Count Basie	Basie	
MGC 667	Lionel Hampton	The Lionel Hampton Quartet/Quintet	
MGC 668	Gene Krupa	The Gene Krupa Quartet	
MGC 669	Billie Holiday	Music for Torching	
MGC 670	Lionel Hampton	Lionel Hampton Big Band	
MGC 671	Roy Eldridge and Dizzy Gillespie	Roy and Diz Vol. 2	
MGC 672	Stan Wilson	A Recital by Stan Wilson	
MGC 673	Lionel Hampton	The Lionel Hampton Quartet	
MGC 674	Various Artists	The Jazz Scene	
MGC 675	Charlie Parker	Charlie Parker with Strings	
MGC 676	Illinois Jacquet	Illinois Jacquet and His Orchestra	
MGC 677	Various Artists	Norman Granz' Jam Session #7	
MGC 678	Count Basie and Joe Williams	Count Basie Swings, Joe Williams Sings	
MGC 679	Art Tatum, Roy Eldridge, Alvin Stoller and John Simmons	The Art Tatum - Roy Eldridge - Alvin Stoller - John Simmons Quartet	
MGC 680	Illinois Jacquet and Ben Webster	The Kid and the Brute	
MGC 681	Gene Krupa, Lionel Hampton and Teddy Wilson	Play Selections from "The Benny Goodman Story"	
MGC 682	Lawrence Brown	Slide Trombone	
MGC 683	Roy Eldridge	Little Jazz	
MGC 684	Gene Krupa and Buddy Rich	Krupa and Rich	
MGC 685	Count Basie	The Count!	
MGC 686	Billie Holiday	A Recital by Billie Holiday	Selections from An Evening with Billie Holiday and Billie Holiday
MGC 687	Gene Krupa	The Exciting Gene Krupa and His Quartet	
MGC 688	Oscar Peterson	The Oscar Peterson Quartet, Vol. 1	
MGC 689	Machito	Afro Cuban Jazz	
MGC 690	Billie Holiday	Solitude	selections from Holiday's first three 10inch LPs
MGC 691	Flip Phillips	Flip Wails	
MGC 692	Flip Phillips	Swinging with Flip Phillips and His Orchestra	
MGC 693	Flip Phillips	Flip	
MGC 694	Oscar Peterson	Recital by Oscar Peterson	
MGC 695	Oscar Peterson	Nostalgic Memories by Oscar Peterson	
MGC 696	Oscar Peterson	Music by Oscar Peterson: Tenderly	
MGC 697	Oscar Peterson	Music by Oscar Peterson: Keyboard	
MGC 698	Oscar Peterson	An Evening with Oscar Peterson	
MGC 699	Chico O'Farrill	Jazz North and South of the Border	
MGC 700	Illinois Jacquet	Jazz Moode	
MGC 701	Illinois Jacquet	Port of Rico	
MGC 702	Illinois Jacquet	Groovin' with Jacquet	
MGC 703	Gene Krupa	Drum Boogie	
MGC 704	Roy Eldridge	Rockin' Chair	
MGC 705	Roy Eldridge	Dale's Wail	
MGC 706	Count Basie	The Swinging Count!	
MGC 707	Hank Jones	Urbanity	
MGC 708	Oscar Peterson	Oscar Peterson Plays Count Basie	
MGC 709	Lionel Hampton, Art Tatum and Buddy Rich	The Lionel Hampton Art Tatum Buddy Rich Trio	
MGC 710	Gene Krupa	Krupa's Wail	(not released)
MGC 711	Various Artists	Norman Granz' Jam Session #8	
MGC 712	Art Tatum	The Genius of Art Tatum #11	
MGC 713	Billie Holiday	Velvet Mood	
MGC 714	Lionel Hampton	Lionel Hampton Plays Love Songs	
MGC 715	Art Tatum and Buddy DeFranco	The Art Tatum-Buddy DeFranco Quartet	(not released)
MGC 716	Roy Eldridge	The Music of Roy Eldridge: Mr. Jazz	(not released)
MGC 717	Harry Edison	Sweets	
MGC 718	Billie Holiday/Ralph Burns	Jazz Recital	
MGC 719	not used		
MGC 720	not used		
MGC 721	Billie Holiday	Lady Sings the Blues	
MGC 722	Count Basie	The Band of Distinction	Reissue of Basie
MGC 723	Count Basie	Basie Roars Again	Selections from Dance Session and Dance Session Album #2
MGC 724	Count Basie	The King of Swing	Selections from Dance Session and Dance Session Album #2
MGC 725	Charlie Parker	Night and Day	
MGC 726	Lionel Hampton	King of the Vibes	
MGC 727	Lionel Hampton	Air Mail Special	
MGC 728	Gene Krupa	The Driving Gene Krupa Plays with His Sextet	
MGC 729	Count Basie	Basie Rides Again!	
MGC 730	Roy Eldridge and Dizzy Gillespie	Trumpet Battle	Selections from Roy and Diz and Roy and Diz #2
MGC 731	Roy Eldridge and Dizzy Gillespie	The Trumpet Kings	Selections from Roy and Diz and Roy and Diz #2
MGC 732	Bob Brookmeyer	The Modernity of Bob Brookmeyer	Reissue of Bob Brookmeyer Plays Bob Brookmeyer and Some Others
MGC 733	Charlie Parker	Yardbird	(not released)
MGC 734	Count Basie	The Band of Distinction	(not released)
MGC 735	Lionel Hampton	Flying Home	
MGC 736	Lionel Hampton	Swingin' with Hamp	
MGC 737	Lionel Hampton	Hamp Roars Again	(not released)
MGC 738	Lionel Hampton	Hamp!	
MGC 739	Bud Powell	The Genius of Bud Powell	
MGC 740	Flip Phillips	Rock with Flip	
MGC 741	Art Tatum	The Art Tatum Trio	(not released)
MGC 742	Various Artists	Down Beat Critics Poll Winners	(not released)
MGC 743	Metronome All-Stars	Metronome All-Stars 1956	Featuring Count Basie and Ella Fitzgerald
MGC 744	Lionel Hampton	Hamp's Big Four	
MGC 745	Woody Herman	Jazz the Utmost!	
MGC 746	Art Tatum	Presenting the Art Tatum Trio	(not released)
MGC 747	Dizzy Gillespie/Django Reinhardt	Jazz from Paris	(not released)
MGC 748	Various Artists	Jazz from St. Germain des Pres	(not released)
MGC 749	Count Basie	Basie in Europe	(not released)
MGC 750	Illinois Jacquet	Swing's the Thing	

== See also ==
- List of record labels
