= The Lionel Hampton Art Tatum Buddy Rich Trio =

The Lionel Hampton / Art Tatum / Buddy Rich Trio

Studio album by Art Tatum, Lionel Hampton, Buddy Rich
- Released: 1955
- Recorded: August 1, 1955
- Studio: Radio Recorders, Los Angeles
- Genre: Jazz
- Length: 39:58
- Label: Clef
- Producer: Norman Granz

Lionel Hampton chronology
The Lionel Hampton Quintet (1954)	The Lionel Hampton / Art Tatum / Buddy Rich Trio (1955)	Hamp and Getz (1955)

Art Tatum chronology
The Art Tatum / Roy Eldridge / Alvin Stoller / John Simmons Quartet	The Lionel Hampton / Art Tatum / Buddy Rich Trio (1955)	The Genius Of Art Tatum, #11

Buddy Rich chronology
Krupa and Rich (1955)	The Lionel Hampton / Art Tatum / Buddy Rich Trio (1955)	Buddy Rich Sings Johnny Mercer (1956)

Alternative cover
- Verve re-issue

Alternative cover
- Pablo re-issue

Alternative cover
- Pablo re-issue as Vol. 3 of The Tatum Group Masterpieces

Professional ratings
Review scores
Source	Rating
AllMusic	4.5/5 stars
The Penguin Guide to Jazz	3.5/4 stars

The Lionel Hampton Art Tatum Buddy Rich Trio is a 1955 album by Lionel Hampton, Art Tatum and Buddy Rich for Norman Granz' Clef Records. The album has been re-issued on Verve as Tatum Hampton Rich and by Pablo as The Tatum Hampton Rich Trio and as Volume three of Pablo's series, The Tatum Group Masterpieces.

The music was recorded on August 1, 1955, at Radio Recorders, Los Angeles; the album was produced by Norman Granz. Later releases added previously unreleased tracks and alternative takes.

== Track listing ==
LP side A

1. "What Is This Thing Called Love?" (Cole Porter) – 7:02
2. "I'll Never Be the Same" (Frank Signorelli, Matty Malneck, Gus Kahn) – 6:37
3. "Makin' Whoopee" (Walter Donaldson, Gus Kahn) – 7:04

LP side B

1. "Hallelujah" (Vincent Youmans, Leo Robin, Clifford Grey) – 4:53
2. "Perdido" (Juan Tizol, Hans Lengsfelder, Ervin Drake) – 5:03
3. "More Than You Know" (Vincent Youmans, Billy Rose, Edward Eliscu) – 4:13
4. "How High the Moon" (Nancy Hamilton, Morgan Lewis) – 5:06

== Releases ==
- Clef MGC 709
- Verve MGV 8093
- Pablo 2310 720
- Pablo PACD 2405 426 2

== Personnel ==
- Lionel Hampton – vibraphone
- Art Tatum – piano
- Buddy Rich – drums
