= Billy Mackel =

American jazz guitarist (1912–1986)

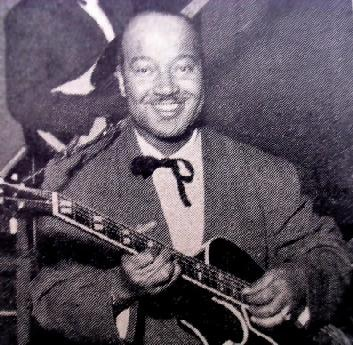
- Billy Mackel, c. 1953

Background information
- Birth name: John William Mackel
- Born: December 28, 1912; Baltimore, Maryland, U.S.
- Died: May 5, 1986 (aged 73)
- Genres: Jazz
- Occupation: Musician
- Instrument(s): Guitar, banjo
- Years active: 1944–1986
- Formerly of: Lionel Hampton

John William Mackel (December 28, 1912 – May 5, 1986) was an American jazz guitarist.

Mackel was born in Baltimore, Maryland. He played banjo early in his career, but like many banjoists of his time he switched to guitar. He led his own band early in the 1940s, then joined Lionel Hampton in 1944 and spent the next thirty years with him. In the 1940s he also recorded with Milt Buckner, Arnett Cobb, Herbie Fields, and others, and worked with Billy Williams in the 1960s. He played left-handed.

== Discography ==
- At Last with Eddie Chamblee, Milt Buckner, Michel Gaudry, Frankie Dunlop (Black & Blue, 1977)
