= Curtis Lowe =

American jazz musician

Curtis Sylvester Lowe Sr. (November 15, 1919 – October 29, 1993) was an American jazz saxophonist.

Lowe was born in Chicago, Illinois in November 1919, and raised in Oakland, California. While he is best known professionally as a tenor and baritone saxophonist, he first learned to play soprano saxophone as a youth. He studied briefly in Alabama before deciding to take up music full-time, playing in traveling bands before the outbreak of World War II. He then enlisted in the United States Army in 1941 then transferred to the United States Navy in 1942; his unit band was full of noteworthy jazz musicians, including Vernon Alley, Wilbert Baranco, Buddy Collette, Jerome Richardson, Ernie Royal, and Marshall Royal. In the 1950s he worked extensively with Lionel Hampton and also played with Dave Brubeck, Little Esther, Johnny Otis, and Gerald Wilson; he also led his own five-piece ensemble in 1952–1953. In 1958 he began a decade-long association with Earl Hines. Lowe was active locally in the Bay Area into the 1980s and died there in October 1993 at the age of 73.
