= Lionel Hampton =

American jazz vibraphonist, percussionist, and bandleader (1908–2002)

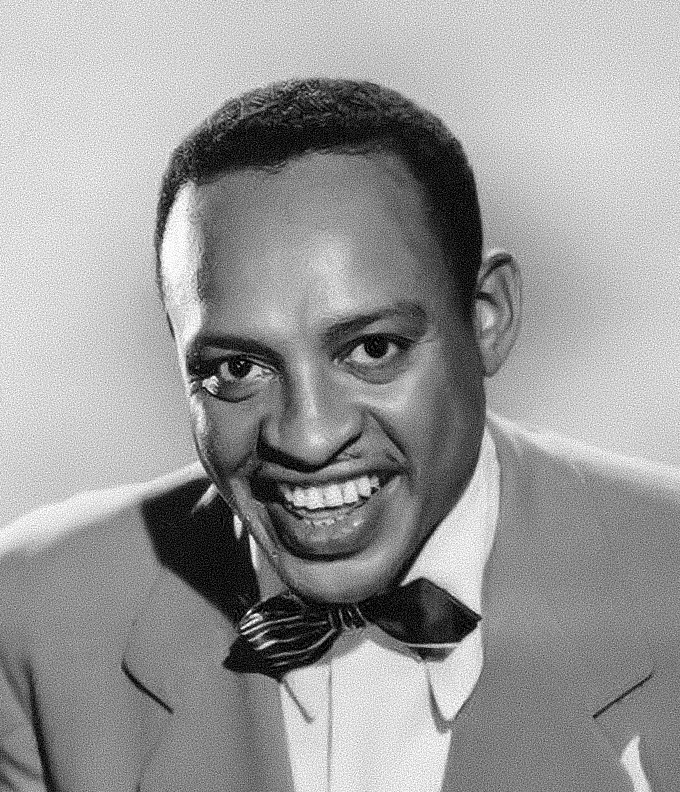
- Hampton in 1948

Background information
- Born: Lionel Leo Hampton; April 20, 1908; Louisville, Kentucky, U.S.
- Died: August 31, 2002 (aged 94) New York City, U.S.
- Genres: Swing; big band; mainstream jazz; blues
- Occupations: Musician; composer; bandleader
- Instruments: Vibraphone; percussion
- Years active: 1927–2002
- Label: Decca
- Formerly of: Chicago Defender Newsboys' Band; Dixieland Blues-Blowers; The Quality Serenaders; The Les Hite Band; The Benny Goodman Quartet; The Lionel Hampton Orchestra

Lionel Leo Hampton (April 20, 1908 – August 31, 2002) was an American jazz vibraphonist, percussionist, and bandleader. He worked with jazz musicians from Teddy Wilson, Benny Goodman, and Buddy Rich to Charlie Parker, Charles Mingus, and Quincy Jones. In 1992, he was inducted into the Alabama Jazz Hall of Fame, and he was awarded the National Medal of Arts in 1996.

== Biography ==
=== Early life ===
Lionel Hampton was born in Louisville, Kentucky, and was raised by his mother. Shortly after he was born, he and his mother moved to her hometown of Birmingham, Alabama. He spent his early childhood in Kenosha, Wisconsin, before he and his family moved to Chicago, Illinois, in 1916. As a youth, Hampton was a member of the Bud Billiken Club, an alternative to the Boy Scouts of America, which was off-limits because of racial segregation.

During the 1920s, while still a teenager, Hampton took xylophone lessons from Jimmy Bertrand and began to play drums. Hampton was raised Catholic and started out playing fife and drum at the Holy Rosary Academy near Chicago.

=== Early career ===
Hampton began his career playing drums for the Chicago Defender Newsboys' Band (led by Major N. Clark Smith) while still a teenager in Chicago. While he lived in Chicago, Hampton saw Louis Armstrong at the Vendome, recalling that the entire audience went crazy after his first solo.

He moved to California in 1927 or 1928, playing drums for the Dixieland Blues-Blowers. He made his recording debut with The Quality Serenaders led by Paul Howard, then left for Culver City and drummed for the Les Hite band at Sebastian's Cotton Club. One of his trademarks as a drummer was his ability to do stunts with multiple pairs of sticks such as twirling and juggling without missing a beat.

During this period, he began practicing on the vibraphone. In 1930 Louis Armstrong came to California and hired the Les Hite band for performances and recordings. Armstrong was impressed with Hampton's playing after Hampton reproduced Armstrong's solo on the vibraphone and asked him to play behind him like that during vocal choruses. So began his career as a vibraphonist, popularizing the use of the instrument in the process.

While working with the Les Hite band, Hampton also occasionally did some performing with Nat Shilkret and his orchestra. During the early 1930s, he studied music at the University of Southern California. In 1934 he led his own orchestra, and then appeared in the Bing Crosby film Pennies From Heaven (1936) alongside Louis Armstrong (wearing a mask in a scene while playing drums).

=== With Benny Goodman ===
As far as I'm concerned, what he did in those days—and they were hard days in 1937—made it possible for Negroes to have their chance in baseball and other fields.

— Lionel Hampton on Benny Goodman

Also in November 1936, the Benny Goodman Orchestra came to Los Angeles to play the Palomar Ballroom. When John Hammond brought Goodman to see Hampton perform, Goodman invited him to join his trio, which soon became the Benny Goodman Quartet with pianist Teddy Wilson and drummer Gene Krupa completing the lineup. The Trio and Quartet were among the first racially integrated jazz groups to perform before audiences, and were a leading small group of the day.

=== Lionel Hampton Orchestra ===
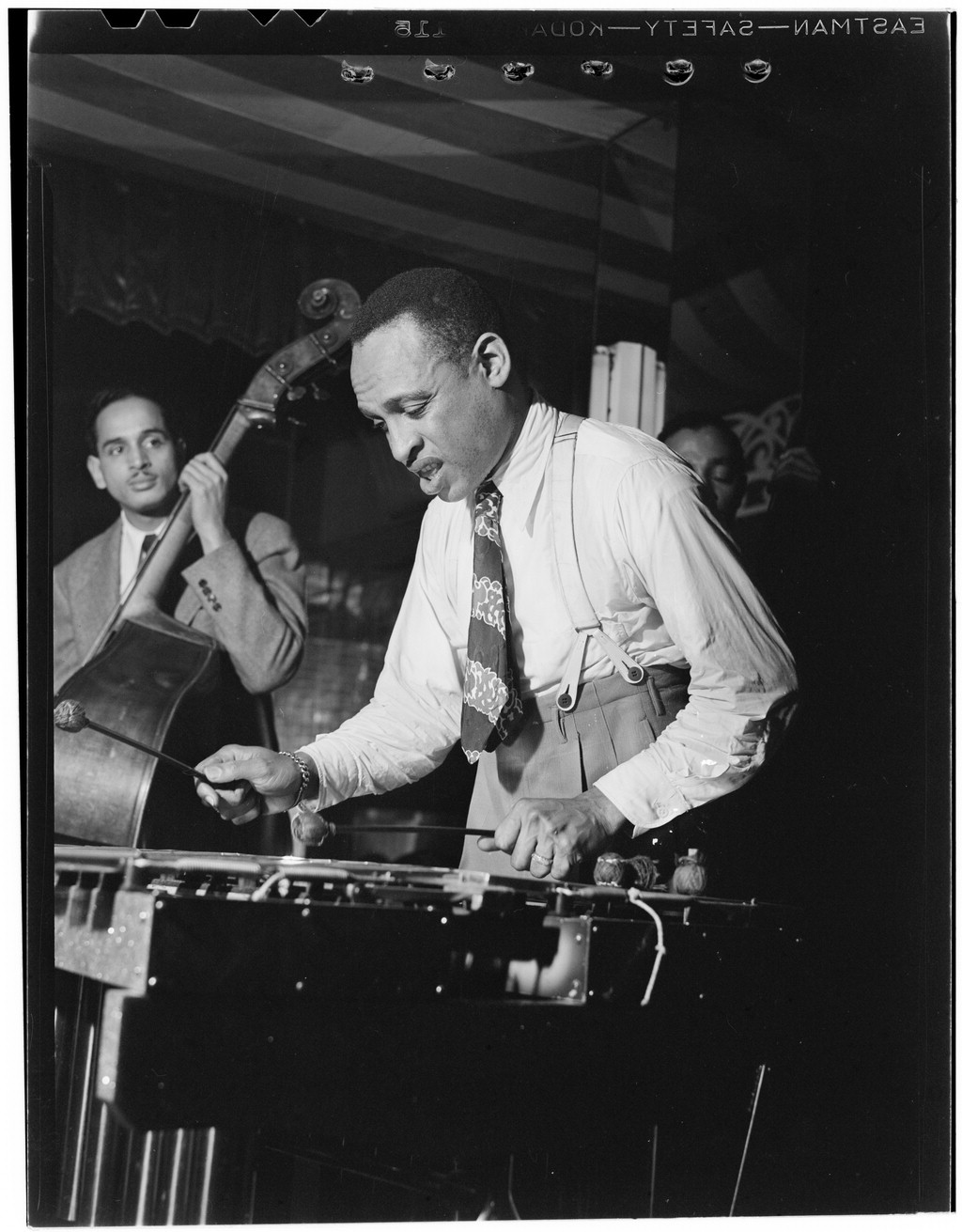
Lionel Hampton at the Aquarium, New York, c. June 1946 (photograph: William Gottlieb)

While Hampton worked for Goodman in New York, he recorded with several different small groups known as the Lionel Hampton Orchestra, as well as assorted small groups within the Goodman band. In 1940 Hampton left the Goodman organization under amicable circumstances to form his own big band.

Hampton's orchestra developed a high profile during the 1940s and early 1950s. His third recording with them in 1942 produced the version of "Flying Home", featuring a solo by Illinois Jacquet that anticipated rhythm & blues. Although Hampton first recorded "Flying Home" under his own name with a small group in 1940 for Victor, the best known version is the big band version recorded for Decca on May 26, 1942, in a new arrangement by Hampton's pianist Milt Buckner. The 78 rpm disc became successful enough for Hampton to record "Flyin' Home #2" in 1944, this time a feature for Arnett Cobb. The song went on to become the theme song for all three men.

Guitarist Billy Mackel first joined Hampton in 1944, and would perform and record with him almost continuously through to the late 1970s. In 1947, Hampton performed "Stardust" at a "Just Jazz" concert for producer Gene Norman, also featuring Charlie Shavers and Slam Stewart; the recording was issued by Decca. Later, Norman's GNP Crescendo label issued the remaining tracks from the concert.

Hampton was a featured artist at numerous Cavalcade of Jazz concerts held at Wrigley Field in Los Angeles and produced by Leon Hefflin Sr. His first performance was at the second Cavalcade of Jazz concert held on October 12, 1946, and also featured Jack McVea, Slim Gaillard, T-Bone Walker, the Honeydrippers, and Louis Armstrong.

The fifth Cavalcade of Jazz concert was held in two locations, Wrigley Field in Los Angeles and Lane Field in San Diego on July 10, 1949 and September 3, 1949, respectively. Betty Carter, Jimmy Witherspoon, Buddy Banks, Smiley Turner, and Big Jay McNeely also played with Hampton.

It was at the sixth Cavalcade of Jazz on June 25, 1950, that Hampton's playing precipitated the closest thing to a riot in the show's eventful history. Lionel and his band paraded around the ball park's infield playing ‘Flying High’. The huge crowd, around 14,000, went berserk, tossing cushions, coats, hats, programs, and just about anything else they could lay hands on and swarmed on the field. Dinah Washington, Roy Milton, PeeWee Crayton, Lillie Greenwood, and Tiny Davis and Her Hell Divers were also featured.

Hampton's eleventh and final Cavalcade of Jazz concert held on July 24, 1955 also featured Big Jay McNeely, The Medallions, The Penguins, and James Moody and his Orchestra.

From the mid-1940s until the early 1950s, Hampton led a lively rhythm & blues band whose Decca Records recordings included numerous young performers who later had significant careers. They included bassist Charles Mingus, saxophonist Johnny Griffin, guitarist Wes Montgomery, vocalist Dinah Washington, and vocal stylist "Little" Jimmy Scott. Other noteworthy band members were trumpeters Dizzy Gillespie, Cat Anderson, Kenny Dorham, and Snooky Young, trombonist Jimmy Cleveland, and saxophonists Jerome Richardson and Curtis Lowe.

The Hampton orchestra that toured Europe in 1953 included Clifford Brown, Gigi Gryce, Anthony Ortega, Monk Montgomery, George Wallington, Art Farmer, Quincy Jones, and singer Annie Ross. Hampton continued to record with small groups and jam sessions during the 1940s and 1950s, with Oscar Peterson, Buddy DeFranco, and others. In 1955, while in California working on The Benny Goodman Story he recorded with Stan Getz and made two albums with Art Tatum for Norman Granz as well as with his own big band.

Hampton performed with Louis Armstrong and Italian singer Lara Saint Paul at the 1968 Sanremo Music Festival in Italy. The performance created a sensation with Italian audiences, as it broke into a real jazz session. That same year, Hampton received a Papal Medal from Pope Paul VI.

=== Later career ===
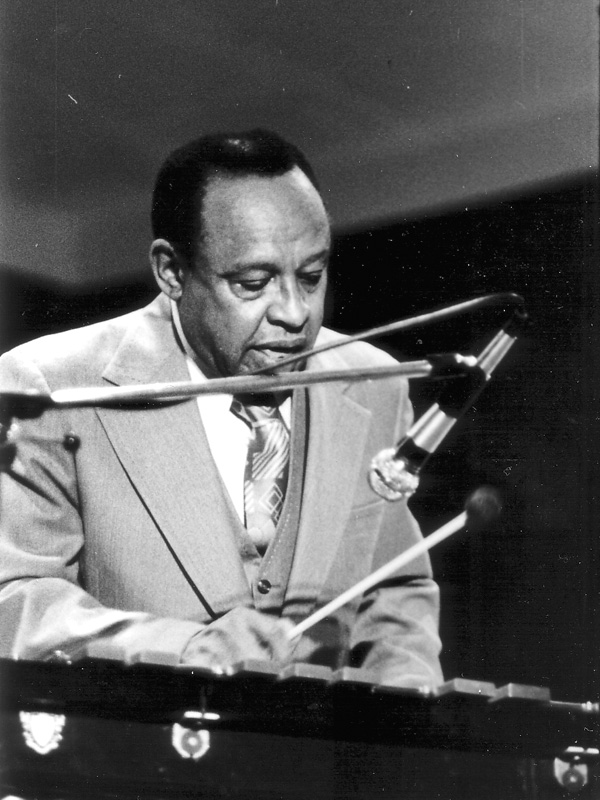
Lionel Hampton during a concert in Aachen, Germany on May 19, 1977

During the 1960s, Hampton's groups were in decline; he was still performing what had succeeded for him earlier in his career. He did not fare much better in the 1970s, though he recorded actively for his Who's Who in Jazz record label, which he founded in 1977-78.

Beginning in February 1984, Hampton and his band played at the University of Idaho's annual jazz festival, which was renamed the Lionel Hampton Jazz Festival the following year. In 1987, the UI's school of music was renamed for Hampton, the first university music school named for a jazz musician.

During much of the 1980s, some notable sidemen in Hampton's orchestra included Thomas Chapin, Paul Jeffrey, Frankie Dunlop, Arvell Shaw, John Colianni, Oliver Jackson and George Duvivier. Hampton remained active until a stroke in Paris in 1991 led to a collapse on stage. That incident, combined with years of chronic arthritis, forced him to cut back drastically on performances. However, he did play at the Smithsonian National Museum of American History in 2001 shortly before his death. On April 15, 2002, the United States Congress celebrated Hampton's life and "resolved by the Senate (the House of Representatives concurring), That the Congress, on behalf of the American people, extends its birthday greetings and best wishes to Lionel Hampton on the occasion of his 94th birthday."

Hampton died at age 94 from congestive heart failure at Mount Sinai Hospital in New York City on August 31, 2002. His funeral was held a week later on September 7 and featured a performance by Wynton Marsalis and David Ostwald's Gully Low Jazz Band at Riverside Church in Manhattan; the Saturday procession began at The Cotton Club in Harlem. Speakers at his funeral included U.S. representatives Charles Rangel and John Conyers and former president George H. W. Bush; Hampton was interred at Woodlawn Cemetery in The Bronx.

== Personal life ==
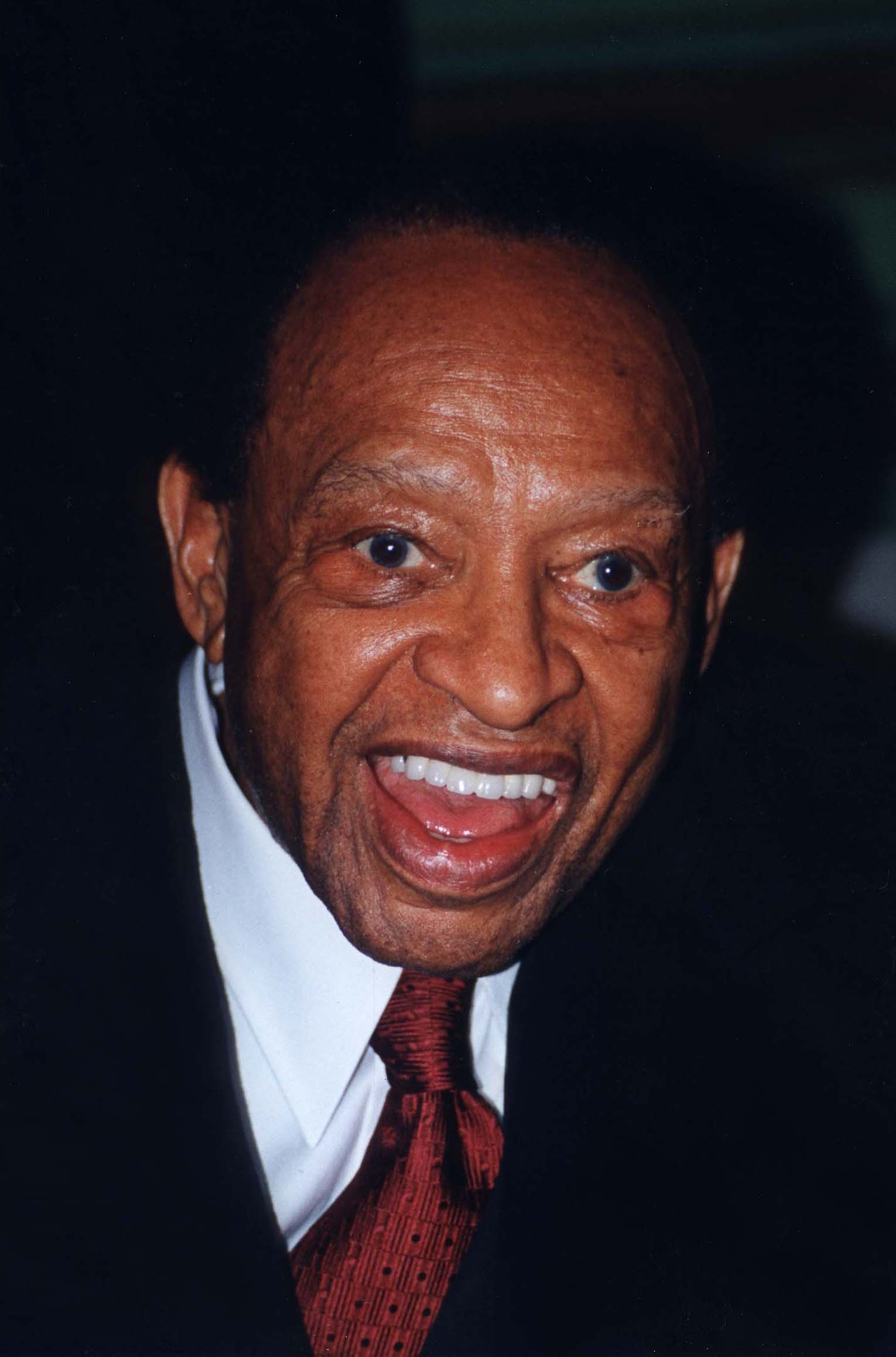
Hampton in 1997

On November 11, 1936, in Yuma, Arizona, Lionel Hampton married Gladys Riddle (1913–1971). Gladys was Lionel's business manager throughout much of his career. Many musicians recall that Lionel ran the music and Gladys ran the business.

Around 1945 or 1946, he handed a pair of vibraphone mallets to then-five year old (later jazz musician) Roy Ayers.

During the 1950s, he had a strong interest in Judaism and raised money for Israel. In 1953 he composed a King David suite and performed it in Israel with the Boston Pops Orchestra. Later in life Hampton became a Christian Scientist. Hampton was also a Thirty-third degree Prince Hall freemason.

In January 1997, his apartment caught fire and destroyed his awards and belongings; Hampton escaped uninjured.

== Charity ==
Hampton was deeply involved in the construction of various public housing projects, and he founded the Lionel Hampton Development Corporation. Construction began with the Lionel Hampton Houses in Harlem, New York, in the 1960s, with the help of Republican governor Nelson Rockefeller. His wife was also involved in construction of a housing project in her name, the Gladys Hampton Houses. Gladys died in 1971. In the 1980s, Hampton built another housing project called Hampton Hills in Newark, New Jersey.

Hampton was a staunch Republican and served as a delegate to several Republican National Conventions. He served as vice-chairman of the New York Republican County Committee for some years and also was a member of the New York City Human Rights Commission. He served as Director of Special Events for Gerald Ford's 1976 re-election campaign. Hampton donated almost $300,000 to Republican campaigns and committees throughout his lifetime. However, in 1996 he endorsed Bill Clinton and Al Gore, saying that the Republican party, which he had joined because it was the party of Lincoln, no longer represented moderates like himself.

== Awards ==
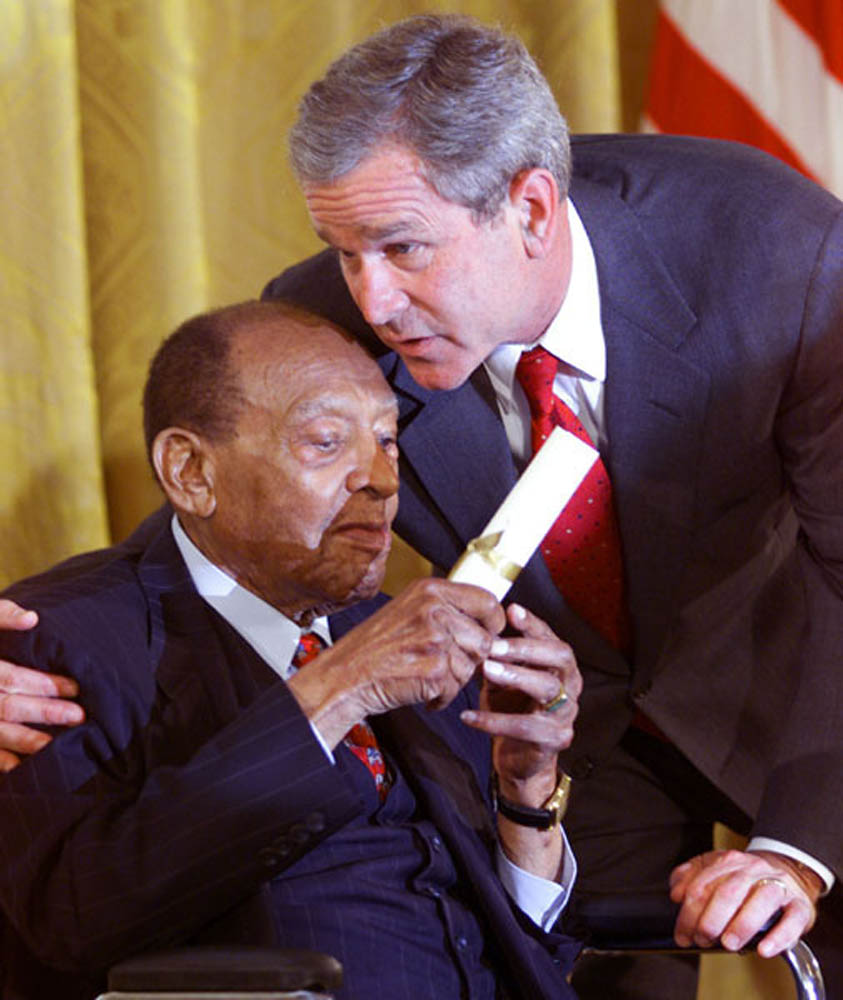
President George W. Bush honors Lionel Hampton during a ceremony recognizing Black Music Month in the White House in 2001.

- 2021 – Grammy Lifetime Achievement Award (posthumous)
- 2001 – Harlem Jazz and Music Festival's Legend Award
- 1996 – International Jazz Hall of Fame Induction and Award (performed "Flying Home" with Illinois Jacquet and the Count Basie Orchestra)
- 1996 – National Medal of Arts presented by President Bill Clinton
- 1995 – Honorary Commissioner of Civil Rights by George Pataki
- 1995 – Honorary Doctorate from the New England Conservatory of Music
- 1993 – Honorary Doctorate from the University of Maryland Eastern Shore
- 1992 – Inducted into the Alabama Jazz Hall of Fame
- 1992 – "Contributions To The Cultural Life of the Nation" award from John F. Kennedy Center for the Performing Arts
- 1988 – The National Endowment for the Arts Jazz Masters Fellowship
- 1988 – The National Association of Jazz Educators Hall of Fame Award
- 1987 – Honorary Doctorate of Humanities from the University of Idaho – UI's School of Music was renamed Lionel Hampton School of Music
- 1987 – The Roy Wilkins Memorial Award from the NAACP
- 1986 – The "One of a Kind" Award from Broadcast Music, Inc.
- 1984 – Jazz Hall of Fame Award from the Institute of Jazz Studies
- 1984 – Honorary Doctorate of Music from USC
- 1983 – The International Film and Television Festival of New York City Award
- 1983 – Honorary Doctorate of Humane Letters from the State University of New York
- 1982 – Hollywood Walk of Fame Star
- 1981 – Honorary Doctorate of Humanities from Glassboro State College
- 1981 – News and Documentary Emmy Award for Outstanding Musical Direction.
- 1979 – Honorary Doctorate of Music from Howard University
- 1978 – Bronze Medallion from New York City
- 1976 – Honorary Doctorate of Humanities from Daniel Hale Williams University
- 1975 – Honorary Doctorate of Music from Xavier University of Louisiana
- 1974 – Honorary Doctorate of Fine Arts from Pepperdine University
- 1968 – Papal Medal from Pope Paul VI
- 1966 – Handel Medallion
- 1957 – American Goodwill Ambassador by President Dwight D. Eisenhower
- 1954 – Israel's Statehood Award

== Discography ==
=== Compilations and original issues ===
Year recorded	Album title	Label	Year released	Notes
1938	Benny Goodman – The Famous 1938 Carnegie Hall Jazz Concert	Columbia SL-160	1950	[2LP] Live with Teddy Wilson and Gene Krupa, appearing as a sideman for Benny Goodman
1937–1939	Benny Goodman – The Complete RCA Victor Small Group Recordings	RCA/BMG 68764	1997	[3CD] Along with Teddy Wilson and Gene Krupa, appearing as a sideman for Benny Goodman
1937–1939	Hot Mallets, Vol. 1	Bluebird RCA 6458-2-RB	1987	The All-Star groups including appearances by Cootie Williams, Johnny Hodges, Harry James, Benny Carter, Chu Berry, Ziggy Elman, Dizzy Gillespie, Coleman Hawkins, Ben Webster, Charlie Christian
1937–1939	The Jumpin' Jive, Vol. 2	Bluebird RCA 2433-2-RB	1990	The All-Star groups including appearances by Johnny Hodges, Benny Carter, Chu Berry, Ziggy Elman, Dizzy Gillespie
1939–1940	Tempo And Swing, Vol. 3	Bluebird RCA 66039-2	1992	The All-Star groups including appearances by Coleman Hawkins, Ben Webster, Nat "King" Cole, Oscar Moore, Helen Forrest
1945	All American Award Concert	Decca DL-8088	1955	[12" LP] Recorded at Carnegie Hall
1947	Gene Norman Presents Just Jazz (AKA The "Original" Star Dust)	Decca DL-7013 [10" LP]; DL-9055 [12" LP]; DL-74194	1958	The famous "Just Jazz" jam session; recorded at the Civic Auditorium, Pasadena CA
1947	Lionel Hampton with the Just Jazz All Stars	GNP Crescendo GNP-15 [12" LP]/various Vogue 78s/London (1972 transfer)	1955	With Charlie Shavers, Willie Smith, Corky Corcoran, Milt Buckner, Slam Stewart, Jackie Mills, Lee Young
1947	Hamp's Boogie Woogie	Decca A-523; DL-5230 [10" LP]	1947	A 4-disc collection of 78 rpm recordings: #23836, #23837, #23838, #23839, includes 6 tracks by Hampton & His Orchestra, plus 1 track by His Septet, and 1 track by His Quartet
1947	New Movements In Be-Bop	Decca A-661; DL-5222 [10" LP]	1948	A 4-disc collection of 78 rpm recordings: #24428, #24429, #24430, #24431, includes 4 tracks by Hampton & His Orchestra, and 4 tracks by Hampton & His Sextet
1951	Moonglow	Decca A-804; DL-5297 [10" LP]; DL-8230 [12" LP]	1951	A 4-disc collection of 78 rpm recordings: #27372, #27373, #27374, #27375, includes 8 tracks by Hampton & His Sextet; the 12-inch LP contains 3 extra tracks
1953	Lionel Hampton's Paris All Stars (AKA Jazz Time Paris)	RCA/BMG 51150	1997	[CD] Compilation of Vogue LD-166, LD-167, LD-168 (all 10" LPs)
1953	Hamp In Paris	EmArcy MG-26037 [10" LP]; MG-36032 [12" LP]	1955	With Milton "Mezz" Mezzrow
1953	Crazy Hamp	EmArcy MG-26038 [10" LP]; MG-36032 [12" LP]	1954	The second volume of the previous set; both 10" LPs (8 tracks worth) reissued on the 12-inch LP
1954	Apollo Hall Concert 1954	Philips B 10157, Epic LN 3190	1954	[12" LP]
1954	The Lionel Hampton Quintet	Clef MGC-628; Verve	1954	With Buddy DeFranco, Oscar Peterson, Ray Brown, Buddy Rich; includes a 17-minute jam on "Flyin' Home". ––––– NOTE: there is also a 5-CD box set [731455979725] of the complete Verve recordings of Hampton's quartets and quintets with Peterson, as well as a number of other single-disc compilations.
1954	Wailin' at the Trianon	Columbia CL-711	1955	
1955	Crazy Rhythm	EmArcy MG-36034	1955	
1955	Jam Session In Paris	EmArcy MG-36035	1955	The second volume of the previous set
1955	Hamp and Getz	Norgran MGN-1037; Verve	1955	With Stan Getz, Lou Levy, Leroy Vinnegar, Shelly Manne
1955	The Lionel Hampton Art Tatum Buddy Rich Trio	Clef Records	1956	With Art Tatum, Buddy Rich
1951, 1955	Oh Rock!	MGM E-285 (10-inch LP); E-3386 (12-inch LP)	1955	Contains 12 of the 21 tracks that Hampton & His Orchestra recorded for the MGM label in 1951.
1956	Jazz Flamenco	RCA Victor LPM-1422	1957	Recorded in Madrid, Spain; with Maria Angelica on castanets
1958?	The High & The Mighty	Verve MGV-8228	1958	Supervised by Norman Granz
1958?	Lionel ... Plays Drums, Vibes, Piano	Audio Fidelity AFSD-5849; Avid	1958	
1959?	Hamp's Big Band	Audio Fidelity AFSD-5913; Avid	1959	
1959?	Golden Vibes	Columbia CL-1304/CS-8110; Collectables	1959	With "Reeds And Rhythm" (a reed quintet + rhythm section)
1960	Silver Vibes	Columbia CL-1486/CS-8277; Collectables	1960	With "Trombones And Rhythm" (a trombone quartet + rhythm section)
1961?	Soft Vibes, Soaring Strings	Columbia CL-1661/CS-8461	1961	
1962?	Many Splendored Vibes	Epic BA-16027	1962	
1963?	The Great Hamp and Little T – Lionel Hampton & Charlie Teagarden In Person	Coral CRL-757438	1963	Co-led with Charlie Teagarden. Live at The Silver Slipper, Las Vegas
1963?	Benny Goodman Quartet, Together Again!	RCA Victor LPM-2698	1963	The reunion with Teddy Wilson and Gene Krupa
1964	You Better Know It!!!	Impulse! AS-78; GRP/Impulse! GRD-140	1964	With Clark Terry, Ben Webster, Hank Jones, Milt Hinton, Osie Johnson
1970?	Them Changes	Brunswick BL-754182; Versatile NED-1128	1972	
1972?	Please Sunrise	Brunswick BL-754190	1973	
1973?	There It Is!	Brunswick BL-754198	1973	
1974?	Stop! I Don't Need No Sympathy!	Brunswick BL-754203	1974	
1974	Transition	Groove Merchant GM-3302	1974	Co-led with Buddy Rich, with Zoot Sims, Teddy Wilson, George Duvivier
1975	The Works!	Groove Merchant GM-4400	1975	[2LP] Live
1976?	Off Into A Black Thing	Brunswick BL-754213	1976	
1977	Lionel Hampton and His Jazz Giants 77	Black & Blue 33.107; BB-870	1977	With Cat Anderson, Eddie Chamblee, Milt Buckner, Billy Mackel
1977	Lionel Hampton and His Jazz Giants, Vol. 2	Black & Blue 33.130; BB-870	1977	The second volume of the previous set; 11 tracks from these sessions are reissued on the CD
1977	Alive & Jumping	MPS 15469	1978	With Milt Buckner
1977	Lionel Hampton Presents: The Music of Charles Mingus	Who's Who In Jazz WWLP-21005	1977	A tentet session of mostly Mingus compositions, numerous ballads; Hampton and Gerry Mulligan are the major soloists with Mingus playing bass.
1978	Live in Emmen/Holland (AKA Live at The Muzeval 1978)	Timeless SJP-120	1978	Live in Emmen, Netherlands
1973	Good Vibes	51 West/CBS Q-16074	1979	Produced by Sonny Lester
1984	Frank Sinatra, L.A. Is My Lady	Qwest, Warner Bros.	1984	As one of the most remarcable sideman in the recording sessions, including the Brecker brothers, Frank Foster, Frank Wess, George Benson and many others.
1985	Sentimental Journey	Atlantic 81644	1986	Reissue of Glad-Hamp GHS-1025
1988	Mostly Blues	Musicmasters 5011	1989	
1990	Mostly Ballads	Musicmasters 5044	1990	
1991	Live At The Blue Note (with "The Golden Men of Jazz")	Telarc 83308	1991	Live. Jamming with old friends including trumpeters Clark Terry and Harry "Sweets" Edison, trombonist Al Grey, tenors James Moody and Buddy Tate, pianist Hank Jones, bassist Milt Hinton, drummer Grady Tate.
1991	Just Jazz – Live At The Blue Note	Telarc 83313	1992	Live. The second volume of the previous set; again with "The Golden Men of Jazz".
1995	For the Love of Music	MoJazz/Motown 530554	1995	Featuring Norman Brown, Ron Carter, Roy Haynes, Chaka Khan, Tito Puente, Joshua Redman, Dianne Reeves, Wallace Roney, Patrice Rushen, Grover Washington Jr., Stevie Wonder
1998	Live at the John Anson Ford Amphitheatre	Phillip PR-1530	2002	[2CD] Live with Ernie Andrews, Gerald Wiggins Trio, Harry "Sweets" Edison, Teddy Edwards

=== Other compilations ===
Year recorded	Album title	Label	Year released	Notes
1937–1940	Swing Classics – Lionel Hampton and His Jazz Groups	RCA Victor LPM-2318	1961	
1937–1941	The Complete Lionel Hampton Victor Sessions 1937–1941	Mosaic MD5-238	2007	[5CD] All of Hampton's RCA Victor recordings
1942–1944	Steppin' Out – Lionel Hampton and His Orchestra	Jazz Heritage Series; Decca DL-79244; MCA 1315	1969	
1945–1946	Slide Hamp Slide – Lionel Hampton and His Orchestra	Jazz Heritage Series; MCA 1323	1980	
1937–1949	The Lionel Hampton Story	Proper BOX12	2006	[4CD] Selections from various RCA Victor and Decca recordings + AFRS and V-Disc
1946–1949	Rarities – Lionel Hampton and His Orchestra	Jazz Heritage Series; MCA 1351	1982	
1942–1950	Hamp's Golden Favorites – Lionel Hampton and His Orchestra	Decca DL-4296; MCA 204	1962	
1942–1950	The Best of Lionel Hampton	MCA 2-4075	1975	[2LP]
1945–1950	Sweatin' With Hamp – Lionel Hampton and His Orchestra	Jazz Heritage Series; MCA 1331	1980	
1939–1940 + 1956	Greatest Hits – Lionel Hampton	RCA/BMG 68496	1996	Selections from various RCA Victor recordings
1942–1963	Hamp – The Legendary Decca Recordings of Lionel Hampton	GRP/Decca Jazz GRD2-652	1996	[2CD] Selections from various Decca recordings

=== The Chronological ... Classics series ===
note: every recording by Lionel Hampton & His Orchestra is included in this 12 volume series from the CLASSICS reissue label

- The Chronological Lionel Hampton & His Orchestra 1937–1938 (#524) – RCA Victor recordings
- The Chronological Lionel Hampton & His Orchestra 1938–1939 (#534) – RCA Victor recordings
- The Chronological Lionel Hampton & His Orchestra 1939–1940 (#562) – RCA Victor recordings
- The Chronological Lionel Hampton & His Orchestra 1940–1941 (#624) – RCA Victor recordings; first Decca session
- The Chronological Lionel Hampton & His Orchestra 1942–1944 (#803) – Decca recordings
- The Chronological Lionel Hampton & His Orchestra 1945–1946 (#922) – Decca recordings
- The Chronological Lionel Hampton & His Orchestra 1946 (#946) – Decca recordings
- The Chronological Lionel Hampton & His Orchestra 1947 (#994) – Decca recordings
- The Chronological Lionel Hampton & His Orchestra 1949–1950 (#1161) – Decca recordings
- The Chronological Lionel Hampton & His Orchestra 1950 (#1193) – Decca recordings
- The Chronological Lionel Hampton & His Orchestra 1950–1951 (#1262) – last two Decca sessions; MGM recordings
- The Chronological Lionel Hampton & His Orchestra 1951–1953 (#1429) – includes Hamp's first Norman Granz-produced quartet session (September 2, 1953) with Oscar Peterson, Ray Brown, and Buddy Rich.

=== Glad-Hamp Records ===
- GHLP-1001 (1961) The Many Sides Of Hamp
- GHLP-3050 (1962) All That Twist'n Jazz
- GHLP-1003 (1962) The Exciting Hamp In Europe
- GHLP-1004 (1963) Bossa Nova Jazz
- GHLP-1005 (1963) Recorded Live On Tour
- GHLP-1006 (1964) Hamp In Japan/Live
- GHLP-1007 (1965) East Meets West (Introducing Miyoko Hoshino)
- GHLP-1009 (1965) A Taste Of Hamp
- GHS-1011 (1967) Hamp Stamps [includes "Greasy Greens"]
- GHS-1012 (1966) Hamp's Portrait Of A Woman
- GHS-1020 (1979) Hamp's Big Band Live!
- GHS-1021 (1980) Chameleon
- GHS-1022 (1982) Outrageous
- GHS-1023 (1983) Live In Japan
- GHS-1024 (1984) Ambassador At Large
- GHS-1025 (1985) Sentimental Journey (Featuring Sylvia Bennett)
- GHS-1026 (1988) One Of A Kind
- GHS-1027 (1987) Midnight Blues – with Dexter Gordon
- GHCD-1028 (1990) Cookin' In The Kitchen

=== As sideman ===
With Frank Sinatra

- L.A. Is My Lady (Qwest, 1984)

== Filmography ==
Hampton appeared as himself in the films listed below.

Year	Movie	Director	Genre
1933	Girl Without A Room	Ralph Murphy	Comedy
1936	Pennies From Heaven	Norman Z. McLeod	Comedy/Musical
1937	Hollywood Hotel	Busby Berkeley	Musical/Romance
1938	For Auld Lang Syne	?	Documentary
1948	A Song Is Born	Howard Hawks	Comedy/Musical
1949	Lionel Hampton and His Orchestra	Will Cowan	Music
1955	Music, Music and Only Music	Ernst Matray	Comedy
1955	The Benny Goodman Story	Valentine Davies	Drama
1957	Mister Rock and Roll	Charles S. Dubin	Drama/Musical
1978	No Maps on My Taps	George T. Nierenberg	Documentary
1980	But Then She's Betty Carter	Michelle Parkerson	Documentary

== See also ==
- List of people from Harlem
