= Oscar Peterson and Roy Eldridge =

Studio album by Oscar Peterson & Roy Eldridge
- Released: 1975
- Recorded: December 8, 1974
- Genre: Jazz
- Length: 43:05
- Label: Pablo
- Producer: Norman Granz

Professional ratings
Review scores
Source	Rating
Allmusic	4.5/5 stars
The Rolling Stone Jazz Record Guide	4/5 stars
The Penguin Guide to Jazz Recordings	3.5/4 stars

Oscar Peterson and Roy Eldridge is an album by Oscar Peterson, on which he is accompanied by Roy Eldridge.

== Track listing ==
1. "Little Jazz" (Roy Eldridge, Buster Harding) – 4:45
2. "She's Funny That Way" (Neil Moret, Richard Whiting) – 7:34
3. "The Way You Look Tonight" (Dorothy Fields, Jerome Kern) – 6:22
4. "Sunday" (Chester Conn, Benny Krueger, Nathan "Ned" Miller, Jule Styne) – 5:48
5. "Bad Hat Blues" (Eldridge, Oscar Peterson) – 7:34
6. "Between the Devil and the Deep Blue Sea" (Harold Arlen, Ted Koehler) – 5:16
7. "Blues for Chu" (Eldridge, Peterson) – 5:46

== Personnel ==
Performance

- Roy Eldridge – trumpet
- Oscar Peterson – piano and organ
