= On the Road (Count Basie album) =

Studio album by Count Basie
- Released: 1980
- Recorded: July 12, 1979
- Studios: Mountain Studios, Montreux, Switzerland
- Genres: Jazz, big band
- Length: 42:16
- Label: Pablo Today
- Producer: Norman Granz

Count Basie chronology
Live in Japan '78 (1978)	On the Road (1980)	Digital III at Montreux (1979)

Professional ratings
Review scores
Source	Rating
AllMusic	4/5 stars
The Penguin Guide to Jazz Recordings	3/4 stars

On the Road is an album by the Count Basie Orchestra that won the Grammy Award for Best Jazz Instrumental Performance, Big Band in 1981.

== Track listing ==
1. "Wind Machine" (Sammy Nestico) – 3:16
2. "Blues for Stephanie" (John Clayton) – 7:01
3. "John the III" (Bobby Plater) – 4:55
4. "There Will Never Be Another You" (Mack Gordon, Harry Warren) – 2:59
5. "Bootie's Blues" (Count Basie, Booty Wood) – 4:00
6. "Splanky" (Neal Hefti) – 3:42
7. "Basie" (Ernie Wilkins) – 4:27
8. "Watch What Happens" (Norman Gimbel, Michel Legrand) – 2:17
9. "Work Song" (Nat Adderley, Oscar Brown Jr.) – 4:02
10. "In a Mellow Tone" (Duke Ellington, Milt Gabler) – 5:37

== Personnel ==
- Count Basie – piano
- Ray Brown – trumpet
- Paul Cohen – trumpet
- Sonny Cohn – trumpet
- Pete Minger – trumpet
- Bill Hughes – trombone
- Mel Wanzo – trombone
- Dennis Wilson – trombone
- Booty Wood – trombone
- Eric Dixon – saxophone
- Charles Fowlkes – saxophone
- Kenny Hing – saxophone
- Bobby Plater – saxophone
- Danny Turner – saxophone
- John Clayton (bassist) – double bass
- Freddie Green – guitar
- Mickey Roker – drums
- Dennis Rowland – vocals

Production

- Norman Granz – producer
- Arne Frager – engineer
- Dave Richards – engineer
- Dennis Sands – engineer
