= List of jazz arrangers =

The American Federation of Musicians defines arranging as "the art of preparing and adapting an already written composition for presentation in other than its original form. An arrangement may include reharmonization, paraphrasing, and/or development of a composition, so that it fully represents the melodic, harmonic, and rhythmic structure". Jazz arrangers often take music written for other forms like popular, religious, or classical music, and alter the tempo, rhythm, and chord structure to re-create music for a jazz idiom. They can also take so-called head arrangements and commit them to paper.

== A ==
- Mike Abene
- Muhal Richard Abrams
- Toshiko Akiyoshi
- Manny Albam
- Dominic Alldis
- Norman Amadio
- Kenneth Ascher
- Clarice Assad
- Grażyna Auguścik

== B ==
- Rüdiger Baldauf
- Louis Banks
- Eddie Barefield
- Guy Barker
- George Barnes
- John Barry
- Steve Barta
- Count Basie
- Edgar Battle
- Alan Baylock
- Jim Beard
- John Beasley
- Heinie Beau
- John Hubbard Beecher
- Bob Belden
- Louie Bellson
- David Berkman
- Harry Betts
- Carla Bley
- David Bloom
- Mike Bogle
- Benjamín Brea
- Leon Breeden
- Buddy Bregman
- Alan Broadbent
- Bob Brookmeyer
- Dudley Brooks
- John Brooks
- Sylvia Brooks
- Raymond Harry Brown
- Gary Brunotte
- James Tim Brymn
- Miroslav Bukovsky
- Ralph Burns
- Billy Byers

== C ==
- Uri Caine
- Charles Calello
- Benny Carter
- James Chirillo
- John Clayton
- Kenny Clayton
- Avishai Cohen
- Al Cohn
- Bobby Cole
- Jacob Collier
- Alice Coltrane
- John Coltrane
- Chris Combs
- Frank Comstock
- Ray Conniff
- Doc Cook
- Jack Cooper
- Don Costa
- Hank Crawford
- Roy Crimmins
- Gary Crosby
- Alexander Cuesta
- Bill Cunliffe
- Bob Curnow

== D ==
- Jimmy Dale
- Børre Dalhaug
- Tadd Dameron
- Sir John Dankworth
- Dol Dauber
- Michael Daugherty
- Wild Bill Davis
- Ernesto De Pascale
- Maria Pia De Vito
- Frank De Vol
- Eli Degibri
- Eumir Deodato
- Vojislav Đonović
- George Duke
- Eddie Durham

== E ==
- Malcolm Edmonstone
- Richard Edwards
- Eliane Elias
- Duke Ellington
- Alfred "Pee Wee" Ellis
- Don Ellis
- Atilla Engin
- Dave Eshelman
- James Reese Europe
- Gil Evans

== F ==
- Steven Feifke
- Bill Finegan
- Clare Fischer
- Stewart "Dirk" Fischer
- Bob Florence
- Fred Ford
- Reginald Foresythe
- Frank Foster
- Stan Freberg
- Russ Freeman
- Stan Freeman
- Paolo Fresu
- Adrian Fry
- Gil Fuller

== G ==
- Hal Galper
- Allan Ganley
- Joe Garland
- Carlos Garnett
- Chris Geith
- James Gelfand
- Herb Geller
- Russ Gershon
- Michael Gibbs
- Andy Gibson
- Dizzy Gillespie
- Joe Gilman
- Vince Giordano
- Jimmy Giuffre
- Harry Gold
- Benny Golson
- Benny Goodman
- Gordon Goodwin
- Alain Goraguer
- Jerry Gray
- Ferde Grofé
- George Gruntz
- Dave Grusin
- Guttorm Guttormsen

== H ==
- Tim Hagans
- Barrie Lee Hall Jr.
- James A. Hall
- Jim Hall
- Morten Halle
- Louis Halmy
- Lenny Hambro
- Jimmy Hamilton
- Bob Hammer
- Slide Hampton
- Herbie Hancock
- George Handy
- Ken Hanna
- Buster Harding
- Tom Harrell
- Joe Haymes
- Miho Hazama
- Scott Healy
- Jimmy Heath
- Neal Hefti
- Eirik Hegdal
- Fletcher Henderson
- Horace Henderson
- Luther Henderson
- Rick Henderson
- Michel Herr
- Nikolaj Hess
- André Hodeir
- Jan Gunnar Hoff
- Bill Holman
- Geir Holmsen
- Kenyon Hopkins
- Shirley Horn
- Gary Husband
- Margie Hyams
- Dick Hyman

== I ==
- Edward Inge
- Cecil Irwin

== J ==
- Christian Jacob
- Bob James
- Gordon Jenkins
- J. J. Johnson
- Osie Johnson
- Sy Johnson
- Hank Jones
- Herbie Jones
- Jimmy Jones
- Oliver Jones
- Patrick Stanfield Jones
- Quincy Jones
- Thad Jones
- Bert Joris
- Julian Joseph

== K ==
- Egil Kapstad
- Nikolai Kapustin
- Kjell Karlsen
- Dick Katz
- Tom Kazas
- George Kelly
- Hal Kemp
- Stan Kenton
- Zvi Keren
- Kishon Khan
- Tony Kinsey
- Iver Kleive
- Steve Klink
- Tom Kubis

== L ==
- John LaBarbera
- Pocho Lapouble
- Charles W. LaRue
- Andy LaVerne
- Attila László
- Graham Lear
- Kuh Ledesma
- Amy Lee
- William Franklin Lee III
- Michel Legrand
- Brian Lemon
- Hank Levy
- John Lewis
- Magnus Lindgren
- David Lindup
- Joe Lipman
- Fred Lipsius
- Melba Liston
- Fud Livingston
- Curtis Lundy
- Arun Luthra
- Bruce Lynch

== M ==
- Earl MacDonald
- Machito
- Dennis Mackrel
- Taj Mahal
- Willie Maiden
- Henry Mancini
- Johnny Mandel
- Gap Mangione
- André Manoukian
- Frank Mantooth
- Arif Mardin
- Lou Marini
- Skip Martin
- Dmitri Matheny
- Matty Matlock
- David Matthews
- Billy May
- Lyle Mays
- Gary McFarland
- Howard McGhee
- Tom McIntosh
- Neil McLean
- Jim McNeely
- Vince Mendoza
- Don Menza
- Emil Mijares
- Glenn Miller
- Bob Mintzer
- Shinji Miyazaki
- Thelonious Monk
- Phil Moore
- James Morrison
- Jelly Roll Morton
- Michael Philip Mossman
- Ken Moule
- Rob Mounsey
- Gerry Mulligan
- Jimmy Mundy
- Spud Murphy
- Ronald Myers

== N ==
- Randy Napoleon
- Kenny Napper
- Vickie Natale
- Oliver Nelson
- Sammy Nestico
- Ed Neumeister
- Keith Nichols
- Lennie Niehaus

== O ==
- Dale Oehler
- Chico O'Farrill
- Claus Ogerman
- Sy Oliver
- Hasan Cihat Örter
- Marcus Österdahl

== P ==
- Marty Paich
- Charlie Parker
- Jaco Pastorius
- Aris Pavlis
- George Paxton
- Tommy Pederson
- Kim Pensyl
- Jack Petersen
- Herbie Phillips
- Sid Phillips
- Nat Pierce
- Bill Potts
- Bud Powell
- Pino Presti
- André Previn
- Brian Priestley
- Tito Puente

== R ==
- Bill Ramsay
- Ray Reach
- Don Redman
- Ilja Reijngoud
- Don Rendell
- Mike Renzi
- Todd Rhodes
- Goff Richards
- Johnny Richards
- Kim Richmond
- Nelson Riddle
- Jim Riggs
- Doug Riley
- Joe Riposo
- Joe Roccisano
- Shorty Rogers
- Gene Roland
- Tony Romandini
- Florian Ross
- Rashawn Ross
- Scott Routenberg
- Pete Rugolo
- George Russell
- Bill Russo

== S ==
- Philippe Saisse
- A. K. Salim
- Steve Sample Sr.
- John Sangster
- Jovino Santos Neto
- Eddie Sauter
- Jan Savitt
- Paulus Schäfer
- Lalo Schifrin
- Maria Schneider
- Vic Schoen
- Arthur Schutt
- Don Sebesky
- Cheick Tidiane Seck
- Roger Segure
- Matyas Seiber, sometimes under the pseudonym G. S. Mathis
- Paul Severson
- John Sheridan
- Yasuaki Shimizu
- Wayne Shorter
- Don Sickler
- Julian Siegel
- Terry Silverlight
- Even Kruse Skatrud
- Erlend Skomsvoll
- Harry South
- Earle Spencer
- Russ Spiegel
- Peter Sprague
- Bill Stegmeyer
- Lanny Steele
- Jimmy Stewart
- George Stone
- Billy Strayhorn
- Fred Sturm
- Ed Summerlin
- Tierney Sutton

== T ==
- Dan Terry
- Mia Theodoratus
- Frode Thingnæs
- Claude Thornhill
- Mel Tormé
- Eugenio Toussaint
- Jiří Traxler
- David W. Tucker
- Steve Turre
- Alvin Tyler
- Jeff Tyzik

== V ==
- Jerry van Rooyen
- Dick Vance
- Alexander Vladimirovich Varlamov
- Johnny Varro
- Tommy Vig

== W ==
- Chris Walden
- Jack Walrath
- Mervyn Warren
- Trevor Watkis
- Fritz Weiss
- Erling Wicklund
- Vaughn Wiester
- Bob Wilber
- Edward Wilkerson
- Ernie Wilkins
- Mary Lou Williams
- Alex Wilson
- Gerald Wilson
- John Wilson
- Phil Wilson
- Stanley Wilson
- Sam Wooding
- Phil Woods
- Denny Wright
- Rayburn Wright
- Jan Ptaszyn Wróblewski

== Y ==
- Jacob Young

== Z ==
- Joe Zawinul
- Lev Zhurbin
- Torrie Zito
- Bob Zurke
