= Raymond Harry Brown =

American composer, trumpeter & jazz educator (born 1946)

- Born: November 7, 1946 (age 79); Oceanside, New York
- Genres: Big band jazz
- Occupations: Composer, arranger, collegiate educator, jazz trumpeter
- Instrument: Trumpet

Raymond Harry "Ray" Brown (born November 7, 1946) is an American composer, arranger, trumpeter, and jazz educator. He has performed as a trumpet player and arranged music for Stan Kenton (early 1970s), Bill Watrous, Bill Berry, Frank Capp, Nat Pierce (of the Juggernaut Big Band), and the Full Faith and Credit Big Band.

== Career ==
Brown joined Stan Kenton in September 1971, succeeding Gary Lee Pack [b. 1950; Director of Jazz Studies (retired), University of Southern Maine], holding the jazz trumpet chair and serving as an improvisation clinician. The Kenton trumpet section included Mike Vax, Jay Saunders, and Dennis Noday. Brown also contributed arrangements for Kenton, including "Mi Burrito" and "Neverbird". Brown remained with the Kenton Orchestra until November 1972.

Before joining the Kenton Orchestra, Brown had served as arranger and trumpeter with the Studio Band of the United States Army Field Band at Fort Meade, Maryland (1968–71). His tenure with the Army Band and Kenton coincided closely with that of Jay Saunders — trumpet player, and jazz educator, who, while with the Kenton Orchestra, eventually played lead trumpet.

Brown currently leads his own big band, the Great Big Band, which has performed at the Monterey Jazz Festival, the San Jose Jazz Festival, the Santa Cruz Jazz Festival, the Lake Tahoe Music Festival, and jazz venues in the San Francisco Bay area.

== Early career ==
- 1968–71: arranger and trumpet player for the Studio Band of the United States Army Field Band, Fort Meade, Maryland
- September 1971 – November 1972: trumpet player (jazz chair) and improvisation clinician with the Stan Kenton Orchestra
- 1973: became a member of ASCAP
- 1973–74: trumpet player for Bill Watrous Band in New York
- 1973–75: led own rehearsal band in New York City
- March 1975: received a grant for Jazz, Category I, National Endowment for the Arts (to write a composition for the rehearsal band)
- 1974–75: teacher of improvisation in nine New Jersey schools through a grant from the New Jersey State Council on the Arts
- 1974–75: faculty member (teaching arranging, improv, brass), Five Towns College, Merrick, NY
- 1974–79: played trumpet with the New York Orchestra, Thad Jones, Joe Newman, Ray Brown (bassist), Leroy Vinnegar, Mundell Lowe, Bill Berry (William Richard Berry) Big Band
- 1980: member of the Nat Pierce and Frankie Capp Big Band

== Musical family ==
Ray's wife, Sue Brown (b. 1949, New York), is a violinist and teacher of strings – violin, viola, chamber music, and orchestra. She holds a Bachelor of Music from Ithaca College (1971) and a Master of Fine Arts from Sarah Lawrence College (1974), where she studied with Dorothy DeLay. She also did post-grad work at the University of Colorado (1975). Ray and Sue were married on August 26, 1973, and together, they have three daughters, one of whom, Karin, is a violist and is married to cellist Daniel Levitov. Karin earned degrees in music from Oberlin Conservatory of Music (1998) and Juilliard. Daniel is a member of the preparatory faculty at the Peabody Institute.

Ray, born 1946 in Oceanside, New York, grew up in Freeport, New York. He has three older brothers, Glenn Edward Brown (1937–2007), Stephen Charles Brown, Roger V. Brown and a younger sister, Jeanne De Martino.

- Glenn taught music for 28 years.
- Steve is a jazz guitarist, bassist, drummer, composer, and arranger. For 45 years, Steve was professor of music and director of jazz studies at the Ithaca College School of Music (retired 2008). One of Steve's many life achievements is that he formalized jazz studies in 1968 at Ithaca College School of Music, a long-standing, well-known music institution within a well-known liberal arts college that was founded in 1892 solely as a conservatory of music.
- Roger, a civil engineer, played bass. He did two tours with Astrud Gilberto.
- Jeanne, a pre-school teacher, played flute.

Glenn, Steve, and Ray all earned music degrees from Ithaca College – Steve: Bachelor of Music (1964) and a Master of Music (1968); Ray: Bachelor of Music (1968). Ray's nephew (Steve's son) – Miles Brown – is a jazz bassist, performer, and music educator.

Ray's father, Glenn Earl Brown (1914–1965; 1936 graduate of Ithaca College School of Music), was the District Music Supervisor of Public Schools for Long Beach, New York. He was also director of bands at Long Beach Jr. Sr. High School from 1938 to 1965. As a pioneer in jazz education at the scholastic level, he introduced stage bands to Long Beach public schools in 1939. He also ran a music camp — Lake Shore Music Score — at Lake Winnipesaukee, Center Harbor, New Hampshire. Glenn Brown had been, for more than 14 years, a marimba soloist with the Xavier Cugat Orchestra.

Ray's mother, Marie Brown (née Ward) (1916–2002), taught English at Boardman Junior High School in Oceanside for 28 years, where, before retiring from the Oceanside School District in 1982, she served as curriculum coordinator and English department chairwoman. She earned a Bachelor of Music degree from the Ithaca College School of Music in 1935, where she played piano, saxophone, and clarinet. She also held a Masters in English from Hofstra University.

== Selected compositions/arrangements ==
Compositions/arrangements for the Stan Kenton Orchestra

- "Call Me Mister" (Kenton Chart Nos. 565 & 1168)
- "Hit and Run" – EP305104 © 1972 V1718P086 (Kenton Chart No. 488)
- "Is There Anything Still There?" – EP304505 © 1972 V1718P086 (Kenton Chart No. 800)
- "Mi Burrito" – EP354892 © 1973 V1718P086 (Kenton Chart No. 975)
- "Neverbird" (Kenton Chart No. 564)

Performed by Mike Vax and the All Star Big Band (Feb 22, 2008?) on YouTube

Arrangement for the Stan Kenton Orchestra

- "Angel Eyes", Matt Dennis & Tom Adair, arr. Ray Brown

Other compositions/arrangements

- "Route 81 North" (arrangement)
- "Clyde's Glides"
- "Double Fault Blues"
- "AfterThoughts"
- "The Opener"
- "My Man Willie"
- "Tomas Gatos"
- "Arthur Author"
- "Two Rare T-Bones"
- "Procrastination City" – copyright no. EP354893 © 1973 V1718P086
- "Big D and Me" – copyright no. PA0000398365 © 1988
- "Blues for the two K's" – copyright no. PAu000444456 © 1982
- "Got the time?" – PA0000398368 © 1985
- "Haziness" – copyright no. PA0000250024 © 1984
- "Hop, skip, and a Jump" – copyright no. PAu000313614 © 1981

Silicon Valley Repertory Jazz Orchestra, Recorded Feb 2010 on YouTube

- "Little Jeannette Leigh" – copyright no. PA0000250023 © 1983
- "No Timeouts Left" – copyright no. PA0000398361 © 1988
- "Spectrum" – copyright no. PA0000250025 © 1984
- "Three to go" – copyright no. PA0000398367 © 1985
- "Straightahead City"
- "Bossa Barbara" by Steve Brown, arr. Ray Brown
- "Embraceable You/Quasimodo" – Gershwin / Charlie Parker, arr. Ray Brown
- "The Telephone Song" – Music by Menescal, Portuguese words by Boscoli, English words by Gimbel, arr. Ray Brown
- "Bittersweet" – Willie Maiden, transcribed by Ray Brown
- "Our Love Is Here To Stay" – George Gershwin, arr. Ray Brown
- "Del Sasser" – Sam Jones, arr. Ray Brown
- "Kayak" – Kenny Wheeler, arr. Ray Brown
- "Barbara" – Horace Silver, arr. Ray Brown
- "I Could Write a Book" – Rodgers & Hart, arr. Ray Brown
- "The Thumb" – Wes Montgomery, arr. Ray Brown
- "The Ballad of Thelonious Monk" – Jimmy Rowles, arr. Ray Brown
- "Stella By Starlight" – Victor Young, arr. Ray Brown
- "I.C. Light" – Ray Brown (commissioned for the retirement of Steve Brown, March 2008)
- "Turn Out The Stars", by Bill Evans, arr. Ray Brown
- "Louie's Prima"

== Selected discography ==
- The Session, Studio Band of the United States Army Field Band (Brown is one of three arrangers), recorded Washington, D.C., Nov. 1972
1. "Route 81 North", arr. Ray Brown
2. "Is There Anything Still There?" arr. Ray Brown

As a member (jazz trumpet/flugelhorn) of the Stan Kenton Orchestra

- Stan Kenton Today (recorded live, Fairfield Halls, Croydon, Surrey, UK, February 10, 1972, 2nd show), originally released in 1972 by Creative World Inc. (2 LPs, quadraphonic), re-released by Dutton Vocalion (2 CDs), 2005

Selections from a Feb 6, 1972, live audience BBC recording (same band) (Ray is 25 years old in these recordings.)

1. "Chiapas" on YouTube, by Hank Levy (Ray Brown is one of the jazz soloists.)
2. "Minor Booze" (Ray Brown is one of the jazz soloists.) on YouTube
3. "McCarthur Park" (Ray Brown is one of the jazz soloists.) on YouTube
4. "The Peanut Vendor" - featuring the entire trumpet section on YouTube
- The Four Freshmen: Live at Butler University, with Stan Kenton and his Orchestra, Creative World Inc. (2 LPs, quadraphonic), 1972; re-released by GNP Crescendo Records (CDs), 1986
- National Anthems Of The World, Creative World Inc. (2 LPs, quadraphonic), 1972
- Clearwater 72 (recorded at the Fort Harrison Hotel, Clearwater, FL, Mar 1972), Hitchcock Media Archived 2022-03-31 at the Wayback Machine (1 CD), 2002
- Rhapsody in Blue (Live, Las Vegas), 1972

Arrangement recorded by the Stan Kenton Orchestra

- Kenton For Collectors Vol. 3 (recorded live, Towson State University, July 27, 1976), Dynaflow (CD) (released October 16, 2007) (Note: Dynaflow is a collector's label produced by historian Steven D. Harris of Pasadena, CA)
1. "Angel Eyes", by Matt Dennis & Tom Adair, arr Ray Brown

As a member of the Full Faith & Credit Big Band

- Debut, Palo Alto Records, 1980 (Ray Brown conducts, arranges, and plays flugelhorn); OCLC 9913785
- JazzFaire, with Madeline Eastman, Palo Alto Records (LP), 1983 (Ray Brown conducts, arranges, and plays flugelhorn); OCLC 30325285
1. "Hop, Skip & a Jump", arr Ray Brown
2. "Like Someone in Love", arr Ray Brown
3. "I remember Clifford", arr Ray Brown
4. "Barbara", arr Ray Brown
5. "A Time for Love", arr Ray Brown
6. "Can't Handle It", arr Ray Brown
- FF&C III, Sea Breeze (1 LP), 1988; re-released (1 CD) by Sea Breeze, 1994

As leader of Ray Brown's Great Big Band

- Impressions of Point Lobos, Brown Cats Productions Archived 2011-07-08 at the Wayback Machine, Ithaca, NY (CD), 1997; OCLC 36665077
- Kayak Brown Cats Productions Archived 2011-07-08 at the Wayback Machine, Ithaca, NY (CD), 2009; OCLC 708397963

Other recordings

- Ray Brown & Steve Brown: An introduction to jazz improvisation: a basic method of study for all musicians, Piedmont Music Co., Melville, NY (LP), 1975
- Gary Bartz: Music is My Sanctuary, 1975
- Los Angeles City College Jazz Band, 1981 (Ray Brown arranges Is There Anything Still There?)
- Grover Mitchell: Butter Jazz Chronicles, 1978
- Norman Connors: This is Your Life, late 1970s
- Frank Wess/Harry Edison Orchestra: Dear Mr. Basie (recorded live, Kan-i Hoken Hall, Tokyo, Nov 1989) Concord, 1989
- Ernestine Anderson, with the Clayton/Hamilton Orchestra: Boogie Down (recorded Aug 18, 1990) (1 CD), 1989
- Great Moments with Ernestine Anderson (1 CD) Concord Jazz, Nov 8, 1993

Recorded from 1976 to 1990, at Alley Cat Bistro, Culver City, CA; Coast Records, San Francisco; Concord Summer Festival, Concord Pavilion, Concord, CA; Fujitsu-Concord Jazz Festival, Tokyo; Mad Hatter Recording Studios, Los Angeles; Ocean Way Recording Studios, Hollywood, CA

- Michael Paulo Archived 2010-05-09 at the Wayback Machine: Fuse Box (1 CD) GRP, 1990
- Michael Paulo Archived 2010-05-09 at the Wayback Machine: Don't Let Go (1 CD) GRP, 1990
- Michael Paulo Archived 2010-05-09 at the Wayback Machine: Rainbow Room (1 CD) GRP, 1990
- Miles Davis & Michel Legrand: Dingo (film soundtrack), 1990
- Buddy Collette: Live at El Camino College (recorded May 19, 1990, Torrance, CA), 1990
- Mel Torme: Sent for You Yesterday, Concord Jazz, 1990
- David Benoit: Over the Edge (1 CD) GRP, 1991
- David Benoit: Still Standing (1 CD) GRP, 1991
- The Clayton-Hamilton Jazz Orchestra: Heart and Soul 1991
- Child's Play, produced by Steve Brown, Cafe Records (1 CD), 1990
- Kirk Whalum: Love Saw It, Columbia, 1993
- Kirk Whalum: The Language of Life, Columbia, 1993
- Landes Jugend Jazz Orchester Hessen: Magic Morning (recorded in Cologne, Germany, Apr 30 - May 4, 1993), Ray Brown is an arranger of four pieces:

"For Heaven's Sake", comp Donald Meyer, Elise Bretton, & Sherman Edwards, arr Ray Brown
"Die Autobahn 500", arr Ray Brown
"Magic Morning", comp by Dan Haerle Archived 2010-01-17 at the Wayback Machine, arr Ray Brown

- Rickey Woodard: Yazoo City Blues ( 1 CD) Concord, 1994
- Roy Hargrove With Strings: "Moment to Moment", Verve (CD), 2000 (Ray Brown, conductor)
- Live Recording from the Monterey Jazz Festival (recorded Sept. 21, 2002) (private recording, Monterey Jazz Festival tapes held by Stanford University)

with Charlie Haden, Michael Brecker, & Kenny Barron
a. "The Night" (composer/arranger unknown)
b. "American Dreams" (Charlie Haden)
c. "Trends" (composer/arranger unknown) (possibly titled Travels by Pat Metheny & Lyle Mays)
d. "Prism" (Keith Jarrett)
e. "No Lonely Nights" (Keith Jarrett)
f. "Ron's Place" (Brad Mehldau)
g. "Nightfall" (Charlie Haden)
h. "Bird Food" (Ornette Coleman)
i. "America the Beautiful" (Samuel A. Ward, Katharine Lee Bates)
Ray Brown (Raymond Harry Brown) conducts the Festival Orchestra on b, e, f, & i

== Other published works ==
- An Introduction to Jazz Improvisation, by Ray Brown and Steve Brown, Piedmont Music (1975); OCLC 22326461

== Selected film- and videoography ==
- The Music of Stan Kenton (film for television) (note: 1969 is the date given in some resources,

Production director: Stanley Dorfman

1. "Malaga", arr Bill Holman
2. "Intermission Riff", by Steve Graham, Ray Wetzel
3. "MacArthur Park", by Jimmy Webb

Mike Vax, Dennis Noday, Jay Saunders, Ray Brown, Joe Marcinkiewicz, trumpet; Dick Shearer, Mike Jamieson, Fred Carter, Mike Wallace, Phil Herring, trombone; Quin Davis, Richard Torres, Kim Frizell, Willie Maiden, Chuck Carter, reeds; Stan Kenton, piano; John Worster, acoustic double bass; John Von Ohlen, drums; Ramon Lopez, Latin percussion

- Festival de Jazz de Montreux, Switzerland 1979 (film for television)

Count Basie and his Orchestra: Sonny Cohn, Pete Minger, Ray Brown, Nolan Smith (aka Nolan Shaheed) trumpet, fluegel horn; Melvin Wanzo, Booty Wood, Dennis Wilson, trombone; Bill Hughes, bass trombone; Bobby Plater, Danny Turner, Eric Dixon, Kenny Hing, reeds; Charlie Fowlkes, baritone sax; Count Basie, Paul Smith, piano; Freddie Green, guitar; John Clayton, acoustic double bass; Butch Miles, drums; Ella Fitzgerald, Dennis Roland, vocal

- Swing Shift, 1984 film (USA)

Music by: Patrick Williams; music orchestrated by: Billy May, Michael Moores, Jack Hayes; soundtrack personnel: Conte Candoli, Bob Findley, Dick Hurwitz, Ray Brown, Bill Berry, trumpet; Alan Kaplan, George Bohanon, Buster Cooper, trombone; Marshal Royal, Lanny Morgan, alto sax; Pete Christlieb, Bill Green, tenor sax; Jimmy Rowles, piano; John Pisano, guitar; Monty Budwig, acoustic double bass; Frank Capp, drums

- A Tribute to Count Basie, filmed at Kan-i Hoken Hall, Tokyo, November 11, 1989 (film for television)

Personnel: Harry "Sweets" Edison, Joe Newman, Snooky Young, Al Aarons, Ray Brown, trumpet; Al Grey, Benny Powell, Grover Mitchell, Michael Grey, trombone; Marshal Royal, Curtis Peagler, alto sax; Frank Wess, tenor sax, flute; Billy Mitchell, tenor sax; Bill Ramsay, baritone sax; Ronnell Bright, piano; Ted Dunbar, guitar; Eddie Jones, acoustic double bass; Gregg Fields, drums.

- Fujitsu Concord Jazz Festival, filmed at Kan-i Hoken Hall, Japan, November 11, 1990 (film for television)

Personnel: Ray Brown, Pete Minger, Joe Newman, Snooky Young, trumpet; Arthur Baron, Grover Mitchell, Dennis Wilson, Douglas Purviance, trombone; Bill Ramsay, Curtis Peagler, alto sax; Frank Wess, tenor sax, flute; Billy Mitchell, tenor sax; Babe Clarke, baritone sax; Tee Curson, piano; Ted Dunbar, guitar; Eddie Jones, acoustic double bass; Dennis Mackrel, drums, Mel Torme, vocal, drums.

== Honors and awards ==
Ithaca College School of Music

Brown family who studied at the Ithaca College School of Music: As part of the Ithaca College School of Music expansion (2001), a chamber jazz room was added as a gift from Steve McCluski '74 and Kim Joslyn McCluski '74 in honor of the Brown family. A plaque there honors seven members of the Brown family who graduated from Ithaca College:
1) Glenn Brown (1914 – 1965) — Ithaca College School of Music (IC) 1936 (Ray's father)
2) Marie Brown (née Ward; 1916 – 2002) — IC 1935 (Ray's mother)

3) Stephen Charles Brown — Ithaca College (IC) Bachelor of Music 1964; Master of Music 1968 (Ray's second oldest brother)
4) Barbara Katz Brown — IC 1974; 1975 (Steve's wife)
5) Ray Brown — IC 1968
6) Sue Brown — IC 1971 (Ray's wife)
7) Glenn Edward Brown — IC 1959 (Ray's oldest brother)

14th Annual Gail Rich Awards — Cultural Council Associates (of the Santa Cruz County arts community) (Jan 26, 2010)

- Ray and Sue Brown were two of seven being honored — they were being honored for their creative work as music teachers

Video clip of Sue and Ray speaking at the awards ceremony on YouTube (fast forward to 4:13)

== See also ==
- List of jazz arrangers
