= A Classy Pair =

Studio album by Ella Fitzgerald
- Released: 1979
- Recorded: February 15, 1979
- Genre: Jazz
- Length: 39:11
- Label: Pablo Today
- Producer: Norman Granz

Ella Fitzgerald chronology
Digital III at Montreux (1979)	A Classy Pair (1979)	A Perfect Match (1979)

A Classy Pair is a 1979 studio album by the American jazz singer Ella Fitzgerald, accompanied by the Count Basie Orchestra, with arrangements by Benny Carter.

This was Fitzgerald and Basie's second studio recording after Ella and Basie! (1963), and features re-recordings of two songs from the earlier album, "Honeysuckle Rose" and "Ain't Misbehavin'". The two musicians worked together much more frequently during her Pablo years than they had during her years on the Verve label, and this album marked the end of a connection that had begun in 1957.

== Reception ==
Professional ratings
Review scores
Source	Rating
AllMusic	3/5 stars
The Penguin Guide to Jazz Recordings	3/4 stars
The Rolling Stone Album Guide	3.5/5 stars

The AllMusic review by Scott Yanow said that "Basie's sidemen are unfortunately restricted in the Benny Carter arrangements to backup work but Basie has a few piano solos and Fitzgerald is in good voice and in typically swinging form".

== Track listing ==
No.	Title	Writer(s)	Length
1.	"Honeysuckle Rose"	Andy Razaf, Fats Waller	5:58
2.	"My Kind of Trouble Is You"	Benny Carter, Paul Vandervoort II	4:35
3.	"Teach Me Tonight"	Sammy Cahn, Gene de Paul	3:15
4.	"Organ Grinder's Swing"	Will Hudson, Irving Mills, Mitchell Parish	5:56
5.	"Don't Worry 'Bout Me"	Rube Bloom, Ted Koehler	3:30
6.	"I'm Getting Sentimental Over You"	George Bassman, Ned Washington	2:52
7.	"Ain't Misbehavin'"	Harry Brooks, Razaf, Waller	4:00
8.	"Just A-Sittin' and A-Rockin'"	Duke Ellington, Lee Gaines, Billy Strayhorn	4:42
9.	"Sweet Lorraine"	Cliff Burwell, Parish	4:23
Total length:			39:11

== CD Edition ==
Some CD editions not only altered the order of the tracklist, also included two tracks without crediting them: 5 and 11. Times listed on booklets and backcovers are also usually wrong.

No.	Title	Writer(s)	Length
1.	"Organ Grinder's Swing"	Will Hudson, Irving Mills, Mitchell Parish	5:58
2.	"Just A-Sittin' and A-Rockin'"	Duke Ellington, Lee Gaines, Billy Strayhorn	4:48
3.	"My Kind of Trouble Is You"	Benny Carter, Paul Vandervoort II	4:42
4.	"Ain't Misbehavin'"	Harry Brooks, Razaf, Waller	4:06
5.	"Some Other Spring"	Irene Kitchings, Arthur Herzog, Jr.	3:50
6.	"Teach Me Tonight"	Sammy Cahn, Gene de Paul	3:22
7.	"I'm Getting Sentimental Over You"	George Bassman, Ned Washington	2:58
8.	"Don't Worry 'Bout Me"	Rube Bloom, Ted Koehler	3:36
9.	"Honeysuckle Rose"	Andy Razaf, Fats Waller	6:14
10.	"Sweet Lorraine"	Cliff Burwell, Parish	4:29
11.	"Please Don't Talk About Me When I'm Gone"	Sam H. Stept, Bee Palmer, Sidney Clare	2:26
Total length:			46:29

== Personnel ==
- Ella Fitzgerald – vocals
- The Count Basie Orchestra
- Count Basie – piano
- Ray Brown – trumpet
- Sonny Cohn – trumpet
- Pete Minger – trumpet
- Nolan Andrew Smith – trumpet
- Bill Hughes – trombone
- Mel Wanzo – trombone
- Dennis Wilson – trombone
- Mitchell "Booty" Wood – trombone
- Bobby Plater – alto saxophone
- Danny Turner – alto saxophone
- Eric Dixon – tenor saxophone
- Kenny Hing – tenor saxophone
- Charlie Fowlkes – baritone saxophone
- Freddie Green – guitar
- John Clayton – double bass
- Butch Miles – drums
- Benny Carter – arranger, conductor

== Credits ==
- Produced by Norman Granz
- Mastered by Eric Miller and Greg Fulginiti
