= Have a Nice Day (Count Basie album) =

Studio album by Count Basie
- Released: 1971
- Recorded: July–August 1971
- Genre: Jazz/Swing
- Label: Daybreak
- Producer: Tom Mack

Count Basie chronology
Afrique (1971)	Have a Nice Day (1971)	Basie Jam (1973)

Professional ratings
Review scores
Source	Rating
Allmusic	2/5 stars

Have a Nice Day is a 1971 studio album by Count Basie and his orchestra, with all music composed and arranged by Sammy Nestico.

This was Basie's debut recording for Daybreak.

Sammy Nestico, a graduate of Duquesne University who worked for the US Air Force Band, primarily the Airmen of Note, in Washington, DC for 12 years after World War II, had at this time been writing for Basie for four years.

On this album Basie recorded the song Scott's Place written for KFI jazz DJ Scott Ellsworth. Like all other cuts on the LP it was composed by Sammy Nestico. This later became the theme music for Ellsworth's night time radio program.

The title track of this album was also used as theme music. Radio personality J.P. McCarthy used Have a Nice Day to open his "Morning Music Hall" on WJR, a powerful Detroit AM radio station, for several years in the early to mid 1970s. McCarthy overlaid the first few bars of the song with the sound of a wind-up alarm clock, first ticking and then ringing, to greet his listeners each morning.

The album was reissued on CD in West Germany by EmArcy Records (Catalog #824 867–2) and Marketed by Phonogram. (CD itself says "Made in W. Germany by Polygram")

== Track listing ==
1. "Have a Nice Day" – 3:14
2. "The Plunger" – 3:42
3. "Jamie" – 3:22
4. "It's About Time" – 3:03
5. "This Way" – 2:28
6. "Scott's Place" – 3:53
7. "Doin' Basie's Thing" – 2:48
8. "The Spirit Is Willing" – 3:00
9. "Small Talk" – 3:28
10. "You 'N Me" – 2:55
11. "Feelin' Free"" – 2:40

All music composed by Sammy Nestico.

== Personnel ==
The Count Basie Orchestra

- Count Basie - piano
- Paul Cohen - trumpet
- Sonny Cohn
- Pete Minger
- Waymon Reed
- Al Grey - trombone
- Bill Hughes
- Grover Mitchell
- Melvin Wanzo
- John Watson, Sr.
- Bobby Plater - alto saxophone
- Curtis Peagler
- Eric Dixon - tenor saxophone
- Eddie 'Lockjaw' Davis
- J. C. Williams - baritone saxophone
- Freddie Green - guitar
- Norman Keenan - double bass
- Harold Jones - drums
- Sammy Nestico - arranger, conductor
