= Mi Burrito =

Latin American Song

"Mi Burrito" is a popular Latin-American folk song, but the big band jazz arrangement is an original composition by Raymond Harry Brown. Brown composed it for his wife in 1973 when he had a rehearsal band in New York City that included his brother, Steve Brown, Steve Gadd, Tony Levin, Will Lee, Marvin Stamm, Louie Del Gaddo, Dave Taylor, Tom Malone, Sam Burtis, and others. Brown named the composition after a huge stuffed animal burro that he purchased for his wife rural Kentucky, when he was on the road with the Studio Band of The United States Army Field Band.

== Jazz genre ==
The arrangement is a samba-swing featuring a trumpet and tenor sax duet.

== Selected discography ==
=== Professional ===
- Full Faith & Credit (big band), Debut, Palo Alto Jazz Records PA8001 (©1980) (CD – analog & LP); OCLC 9913785

Released in CD format, Avion AVCD-500
Personnel: Raymond Harry Brown (flugal horn, arranger, conductor), Jim Benham (flugal horn), Rich Bice, Tim Acosta, Chase Sanborn, Rich Theurer (trumpets); John Russell, Mike Birch, Joel Karp, Paul Williams (trombones); Dick Leland (bass trombone); Steve Keller, Dave Peterson (alto saxes); Paul Robertson (alto sax on track 1); Matt Schon, Chuck Wasekanes (tenor saxes); Dennis Donovan (bari sax); Dave Eshelman (baritone horn); Billy Robinson (tuba); Smith Dobson (né Smith Weed Dobson IV; 1947–2001) (piano); Paul Potyen (piano, arranger); Steve Brown; (guitar); Seward McCain (bass); Ed McClary (drums)

=== College ensembles ===
- It's Just Talk, Douglas College Jazz Bands Douglas College, New Westminster, BC (1998) OCLC 48994477
- East of the Sun, West of the Moon, Whitworth College Jazz Ensemble, Whitworth College, Spokane, WA (2003) OCLC 55013644
- Moleids, University of South Florida Jazz Ensemble, Mark Records, Clarence, NY (1984) OCLC 17942512
- 23rd Annual Sunbelt Jazz Festival, University of West Georgia Jazz Ensemble (2008) OCLC 319244477
- Program, 1976–1977, no. 633, Indiana University Jazz Ensemble (1977) OCLC 2812704
- Washington State University Jazz Big Band II (2010) OCLC 591292444

=== Selected performances ===
Brown's arrangement of "Mi Burrito" was one of 96 chosen by the One O'Clock Lab Band for their concert tour of the Soviet Union in 1976. Soviet censors, given prior approval of the set lists, prohibited the group from playing two pieces: "Mi Burrito" and "St. Thomas". The band played them anyway, without announcing the titles, and they were included in a live NBC satellite broadcast from Moscow on July 4, 1976.
