= Afrique (album) =

Studio album by Count Basie
- Released: 1971
- Recorded: December 22 & 23, 1970
- Studio: RCA Studio A, New York
- Genre: Jazz/Swing
- Length: 37:36
- Label: Flying Dutchman
- Producer: Bob Thiele

Count Basie chronology
Basie on the Beatles (1970)	Afrique (1971)	Have a Nice Day (1971)

Afrique is a 1971 studio album by Count Basie and his orchestra, arranged & conducted by Oliver Nelson released by the Flying Dutchman label

== Reception ==
Professional ratings
Review scores
Source	Rating
AllMusic	4/5 stars
The Rolling Stone Jazz Record Guide	4/5 stars
The Penguin Guide to Jazz Recordings	2.5/4 stars

AllMusic reviewer Bruce Eder stated: "In late 1970, more than 35 years into his career as a bandleader, Count Basie, working with producer Bob Thiele and arranger/conductor/saxman Oliver Nelson, went into the studio and cut this album of big band blues built on recent compositions -- and they made it sound cutting-edge and as urgent as anything the man had ever turned his talent toward. ... Afrique is one of a handful of absolutely essential post-big band-era albums by him".

== Track listing ==
All compositions by Oliver Nelson except where noted

1. "Step Right Up" – 4:15
2. "Hobo Flats" – 6:13
3. "Gypsy Queen" – 4:00 (Gabor Szabo)
4. "Love Flower" – 2:53 (Albert Ayler)
5. "Afrique" – 3:06
6. "Kilimanjaro" – 6:52
7. "African Sunrise" – 5:11
8. "Japan" – 5:05 (Pharoah Sanders)

== Personnel ==
The Count Basie Orchestra

- Bill Adkins - alto sax
- Bob Ashton - alto, baritone & tenor sax, flute
- Count Basie - organ, piano
- Paul Cohen - trumpet, flugelhorn
- George Cohn - trumpet, flugelhorn
- Eddie "Lockjaw" Davis - tenor sax
- Eric Dixon - flute, tenor sax
- Steven Galloway - trombone
- Freddie Green - guitar
- Bill Hughes - trombone
- Harold Jones - drums
- Norman Keenan - bass
- Richard Landrum - percussion
- Hubert Laws - flute
- Buddy Lucas - harmonica
- Pete Minger - trumpet, flugelhorn
- Sonny Morgan - bongos
- Oliver Nelson - arranger, conductor, tenor sax
- Bobby Plater - alto sax, flute
- Cecil Payne - baritone sax, flute
- Waymon Reed - trumpet, flugelhorn
- Warren Smith, Jr. - drums, percussion, vibes
- Mel Wanzo - trombone
- John Watson - trombone
- John Williams - bass
