= A Perfect Match (Ella Fitzgerald album) =

Live album by Ella Fitzgerald
- Released: 1979
- Recorded: July 12, 1979
- Genre: Jazz
- Length: 41:09
- Label: Pablo Today
- Producer: Norman Granz

Ella Fitzgerald chronology
| A Classy Pair (1979) | A Perfect Match (1979) | Ella Abraça Jobim (1981) |

Professional ratings
Review scores
| Source | Rating |
|---|---|
| AllMusic | 3/5 stars |
| The Encyclopedia of Popular Music | 4/5 stars |
| The Penguin Guide to Jazz Recordings | 3/4 stars |

A Perfect Match is a 1979 (see 1979 in music) live album by the American jazz singer Ella Fitzgerald, accompanied by the Count Basie Orchestra, and featuring Count Basie himself on the last track.

It is the last of four albums Fitzgerald recorded at Montreux Jazz Festival to be released.

Ella's performance on the album won her the 1980 Grammy Award for Best Jazz Vocal Performance, Female.

Two further tracks from this concert, "I Don't Stand a Ghost of a Chance With You" and "Flying Home" appeared on the 1979 album Digital III at Montreux.

== Track listing ==
1. "Please Don't Talk About Me When I'm Gone" (Sidney Clare, Sam H. Stept) – 2:02
2. "Sweet Georgia Brown" (Ben Bernie, Kenneth Casey, Maceo Pinkard) – 3:07
3. "Some Other Spring" (Arthur Herzog Jr., Irene Kitchings) – 4:22
4. "Make Me Rainbows" (Alan Bergman, John Williams) – 3:24
5. "After You've Gone" (Henry Creamer, Turner Layton) – 3:45
6. "'Round Midnight" (Bernie Hanighen, Thelonious Monk, Cootie Williams) – 4:43
7. "Fine and Mellow" (Billie Holiday) – 2:42
8. "You've Changed" (Bill Carey, Carl Fischer) – 3:15
9. "Honeysuckle Rose" (Andy Razaf, Fats Waller) – 3:23
10. "St. Louis Blues" (W. C. Handy) – 5:18
11. "Basella" (Count Basie, Ella Fitzgerald) – 10:21

== Personnel ==
- Ella Fitzgerald – vocals
- Paul Smith – piano

The Count Basie Orchestra

- Count Basie – piano (on "Basella" only)
- Ray Brown, Paul Cohen, Sonny Cohn, Pete Minger – trumpet
- Bill Hughes, Mel Wanzo, Dennis Wilson, Mitchell "Booty" Wood – trombone
- Danny Turner, Bobby Plater – alto saxophone
- Eric Dixon, Kenny Hing – tenor saxophone
- Charlie Fowlkes – baritone saxophone
- Freddie Green – guitar
- Keter Betts – double bass
- Mickey Roker – drums

== Credits ==
- Produced by Norman Granz
- Mastered by Eric Miller & Greg Fulginiti
