= Kansas City 6 =

Studio album by Count Basie
- Released: 1981
- Recorded: November 1, 1981
- Genre: Jazz
- Length: 44:42
- Label: Pablo
- Producer: Norman Granz

Count Basie chronology
Warm Breeze (1981)	Kansas City 6 (1981)	Farmer's Market Barbecue (1982)

Professional ratings
Review scores
Source	Rating
Allmusic	2.5/5 stars
The Penguin Guide to Jazz Recordings	3/4 stars

Kansas City 6 is a 1981 studio album by Count Basie.

== Track listing ==
1. "Opus Six" (Count Basie) – 6:29
2. "Vegas Drag" – 6:14
3. "Scooter" – 4:36
4. "Wee Baby Blues" (Pete Johnson, Big Joe Turner) – 5:33
5. "Blues for Little Jazz" – 4:58
6. "St. Louis Blues" (W. C. Handy) – 4:59
7. "Walking the Blues" (Champion Jack Dupree, Teddy McRae) – 4:48
8. "N.H.O.P." – 7:05

== Personnel ==
- Count Basie - piano
- Eddie Vinson - alto saxophone
- Willie Cook - trumpet
- Joe Pass - guitar
- Niels-Henning Ørsted Pedersen - double bass
- Louie Bellson - drums
