= Kansas City Shout =

Studio album by Count Basie and his orchestra
- Released: 1980
- Recorded: April 7, 1980
- Genre: Jazz
- Length: 42:24
- Label: Pablo
- Producer: Norman Granz

Count Basie and his orchestra chronology
Kansas City 8: Get Together (1979)	Kansas City Shout (1980)	Warm Breeze (1981)

Professional ratings
Review scores
Source	Rating
AllMusic	2.5/5 stars
The Penguin Guide to Jazz Recordings	2.5/4 stars
The Rolling Stone Jazz Record Guide	3/5 stars

Kansas City Shout is a 1980 studio album by Count Basie and his orchestra with singer Big Joe Turner and saxophonist/vocalist Eddie "Cleanhead" Vinson.

== Track listing ==
1. "Just a Dream (On My Mind)" (Big Bill Broonzy) – 3:44
2. "Blues for Joe Turner" (Count Basie, Milt Jackson) – 5:59
3. "Blues for Joel" (Basie) – 4:08
4. "Every Day I Have the Blues" (Memphis Slim) – 4:05
5. "Blues au Four" (Basie) – 2:58
6. "My Jug and I" (Percy Mayfield) – 3:30
7. "Cherry Red" (Pete Johnson, Big Joe Turner) – 4:11
8. "Apollo Daze" (Basie, Eddie "Cleanhead" Vinson) – 3:49
9. "Standing on the Corner" (Basie) – 3:22
10. "Stormy Monday" (T-Bone Walker) – 3:37
11. "Signifying" (Basie) – 3:00

== Personnel ==
- Count Basie – piano
- Eddie "Cleanhead" Vinson - alto saxophone & vocal
- Big Joe Turner - vocal
- David Stahl, Sonny Cohn, Dale Carley, Pete Minger - trumpet
- Bill Hughes, Grover Mitchell, Nelson Harrison, Dennis Wilson, Mitchell Booty Wood - trombone
- Danny Turner, Bobby Plater - alto saxophone
- Eric Dixon, Kenny Hing - tenor saxophone
- Johnny Williams - baritone saxophone
- Freddie Green - guitar
- Cleveland Eaton - double bass
- Duffy Jackson - drums
