= Bill Ramsay =

American jazz band leader (1929–2024)

- Also known as: "Rams"
- Born: William George Ramsay; January 12, 1929; Centralia, Washington, U.S.
- Died: March 2, 2024 (aged 95)
- Genres: Big band jazz
- Occupations: Sideman, band leader, arranger
- Instruments: Saxophone (soprano, alto, tenor, baritone)
- Formerly of: Seattle Repertory Jazz Orchestra

William George "Rams" Ramsay (January 12, 1929 – March 2, 2024) was an American jazz saxophonist and band leader based in Seattle. In 1997, he was inducted into the Seattle Jazz Hall of Fame, the top of eight Golden Ear Award categories presented annually since 1990 by the Earshot Jazz Society of Seattle. Ramsay performed on all the primary saxophones – soprano, alto, tenor, and baritone – as well as clarinet (his boyhood instrument), and bass clarinet. Ramsay died on March 2, 2024, at the age of 95.

== Performance affiliations ==
- Alto sax in the Buddy Morrow Band in the early 60s
- Baritone sax in the Maynard Ferguson Band
- Lead alto sax in the Ray McKinley Band
- Tenor sax in the Benny Goodman Octet
- Baritone sax in the Count Basie Orchestra for two years; Ramsay was hired in April 1984, three weeks before Basie died, to sub for Johnny C. Williams (born 1941), who had been hospitalized; Ramsay got the call from Basie's road manager, Sonny Cohn; Bobby Mitchell had recommended Ramsay to Basie after having heard him with the Benny Goodman Band
- Baritone sax in the Duke Ellington Orchestra
- Toured with Les Brown, Frank Wess & Sweets Edison Band, Grover Mitchell's New York All Star Orchestra, Dennis Mackrel Jazz Orchestra, and Frankie Capp's "Juggernaut."
- Performed with the bands of Thad Jones, Cab Calloway, Mel Lewis, Gene Harris, and Quincy Jones
- In the 1980s, Ramsay led his own big band that performed Sundays at Parnall's Jazz Club in Seattle
- Member of the Seattle Repertory Jazz Orchestra since its founding in 1995.
- Co-leader, with Milton Edwin Kleeb (1919–2015), of the Ramsay-Kleeb Big Band. Based in Seattle, the ten-piece jazz band played the music of Miles Davis, Gil Evans, and Gerry Mulligan.

== Selected discography ==
As leader

- Ramsay-Kleeb Band, "Red" Kelly's Heroes, C.A.R.S. Productions (Los Angeles) (Ramsay arranges, plays alto & clarinet, co-directs) (1997) OCLC 41366927

Note: In the 1980s, Ramsay played tenor sax with Thomas "Red" Kelly's quintet (jazz bass; 1927–2004), Carl Fontana (trombone), David H. Stetler (drums; 1923–2002), and Donald Wing Chan (piano; born 1941)

As arranger

- Jay Thomas with the Cedar Walton Trio, Easy Does It, Discovery (1984) OCLC 26105583

Trombone orchestration by Ramsay

As sideman

- Frank Wess–Harry Edison Orchestra, Dear Mr. Basie Concord Jazz (1989) OCLC 23990660
- Grover Mitchell Orchestra, Hip Shakin', Ken Music (1990) OCLC 27201097 (see audio link below)

also on Ken Music (Japan) & Ken/Passport (Germany)

- Jay Thomas, 360 Degrees (Ramsay plays alto, tenor, and is arranger) Hep Jazz (1990) OCLC 42533509, 473321399
- Mel Torme with the Frank Wess Orchestra, Live at the Concord Jazz Festival, August 17, 1990, Concord Jazz OCLC 23436505, 191888693
- The Frank Wess Orchestra, Entre Nous, Live "Kan-i Hoken Hall", Tokyo, Japan, November 11, 1990 Concord Jazz OCLC 26399518
- Becca Duran with the Jay Thomas Group, Hide & Seek, Discovery Records (1991) OCLC 42537740, 472114081
- Bud Shank, Lost Cathedral, (1995) OCLC 725423103
- Seven Sensational Saxophones – Fujitsu-Concord 26Th Jazz Festival, Jesse Davis, Gary Foster, Bill Ramsay, Ken Peplowski, Chris Potter, Frank Wess, and Rickey Woodard (1994) OCLC 34033773
- Edmonia Jarrett, Live Live Live, recorded at Triad Studios, Redmond, Washington (1996) OCLC 51450175
- Jan Stentz, Forever, MNOP Records (1999) OCLC 190825113
- Seattle Repertory Jazz Orchestra, SRJO Live, Origin Records (recorded in Seattle, 29 March 1997, released 2002) OCLC 50103420
- Mel Tormé, Two Darn Hot: A Night at the Concord Pavilion/Live at the Fujitsu-Concord (2002) OCLC 49747018
- Pete Christlieb, For Heaven's Sake, C.A.R.S. Productions (Los Angeles) (1999) OCLC 51492561
- Jon Belcher & Savoy Swing, Till Tom Special, Irrational Behavior Productions (1999) OCLC 41883270
- Charlie May All Star Big Band Plays the Arrangements of Gaylord Jones (2001) UPC 060325012621
- Lance Buller, Let the Good Times Roll (2002) OCLC 42536477
- Stephanie Porter, Mood Swings (2003) UPC 829757102825
- Phil Kelly & the NW Prevailing Winds, Convergence Zone, Origin Records (2003) OCLC 57072429
- Seattle Repertory Jazz Orchestra, Sacred Music of Duke Ellington, Origin Records (live performances at University Christian Church, Seattle 2001–2005, released 2006) OCLC 70212809
- Phil Kelly & the SW Santa Ana Winds, My Museum, Origin Records (2006) OCLC 182723543
- Bud Shank, Awakening (2006) UPC 614511738521
- Jimmy Heath & the Seattle Jazz Orchestra, Endless Search, Origin Records (2010) OCLC 613453563
- Phil Kelly & The Northwest Bouncing Beagles, Ballet of the Bouncing Beagles, Origin Records (2009) OCLC 505876821
- Stix Hooper, Many Hats (2010) UPC 700261320199
- Primo Kim Villaruz, Make it Right, R.K.K. Productions, Inc. (Bothell, Washington) (2010)
- Milt Kleeb Octet, Something if Nothing Else, Pony Boy Records (2011) OCLC 759193968

Unpublished

- Bill Ramsay & the Hipshaker Big Band, Thaddeus, unpublished live recording at Tula's (2004)

== Filmography ==
- A Tribute to Count Basie, filmed at Kan-i Hoken Hall, Tokyo, November 11, 1989 (film for television)

Personnel: Harry "Sweets" Edison, Joe Newman, Snooky Young, Al Aarons, Ray Brown, trumpet; Al Grey, Benny Powell, Grover Mitchell, Michael Grey, trombone; Marshal Royal, Curtis Peagler, alto sax; Frank Wess, tenor sax, flute; Billy Mitchell, tenor sax; Bill Ramsay, baritone sax; Ronnell Bright, piano; Ted Dunbar, guitar; Eddie Jones, acoustic double bass; Gregg Fields, drums.

- Fujitsu Concord Jazz Festival, filmed at Kan-i Hoken Hall, Japan, November 11, 1990 (film for television)

Personnel: Ray Brown, Pete Minger, Joe Newman, Snooky Young, trumpet; Arthur Baron, Grover Mitchell, Dennis Wilson, Douglas Purviance, trombone; Bill Ramsay, Curtis Peagler, alto sax; Frank Wess, tenor sax, flute; Billy Mitchell, tenor sax; Babe Clarke, baritone sax; Tee Curson, piano; Ted Dunbar, guitar; Eddie Jones, acoustic double bass; Dennis Mackrel, drums, Mel Torme, vocal, drums.

- Diane Schuur: Live from Seattle - With Maynard Ferguson and His Big Bop Nouveau Band (2006) UPC 850172000014

== Service in the U.S. Armed Forces ==
From September 28, 1948, to June 25, 1952, Ramsay served in the U.S. Army. He ended his tour with an honorable discharge.

== Family ==
Parents

William George Ramsay was born in Washington to William Mathew Ramsay (1902–1969) and Edna Mae (née Forsythe; surname at death – Skramstad; 1902–1999). William and Edna were married October 22, 1921, in Lewis County, Washington. Edna remarried Thorvald N. Skramstad (1903–1989) in Centralia, Washington on March 26, 1972.

Sister

Bill Ramsay had one sister, Gloria Phyllis Ramsay (1923–2003), who, in 1946, married Tim Clarence Oconnell (1918–2008).

Spouse

Bill married Lillian (née Halstead; born 1931).

Daughter

Bill and Lillian have a daughter, Jane Susan Ramsay (born 1952) and, grandson, Maxfield Ramsay Marcus, (born 1993).

== Audio & video links ==
- Bill Ramsay, Playing with Mingus & Monk – backstage before the Monk & Mingus concert, Seattle Repertory Jazz Orchestra on YouTube
- Diane Schuur - Live From Seattle: With Maynard Ferguson And His Big Bop Nouveau on YouTube (Ramsay playing bari)
- The Grover Mitchell New York All-Star Orchestra on YouTube, featuring Frank Wess and Doug Lawrence on tenors (Ramsay on bari in the sax section)
