= 88 Basie Street =

Studio album by Count Basie
- Released: 1983
- Recorded: 1983
- Genre: Jazz
- Length: 44:42
- Label: Pablo
- Producer: Norman Granz

Count Basie chronology
Farmer's Market Barbecue (1982)	88 Basie Street (1983)	Me and You (1983)

Professional ratings
Review scores
Source	Rating
AllMusic	4/5 stars
The Penguin Guide to Jazz Recordings	2.5/4 stars
The Rolling Stone Jazz Record Guide	3/5 stars

88 Basie Street is a 1983 studio album by Count Basie.

At the 27th Grammy Awards, Count Basie won the Grammy Award for Best Jazz Instrumental Performance, Big Band for 88 Basie Street.

== Track listing ==
All tracks are written by Sammy Nestico, except where noted.

No.	Title	Writer(s)	Length
1.	"Bluesville"		6:53
2.	"88 Basie Street"		4:50
3.	"Contractor's Blues"	Count Basie	7:53
4.	"The Blues Machine"		6:33
5.	"Katy"		2:35
6.	"Sunday at the Savoy"	Basie	12:32

== Personnel ==
- Count Basie – piano
- Sammy Nestico – conductor, arranger
- Sonny Cohn – flugelhorn, trumpet
- Bob Summers – flugelhorn, trumpet
- Frank Szabo – flugelhorn, trumpet
- Dale Carley – trumpet
- Jim Crawford – trumpet
- Bill Hughes – trombone
- Grover Mitchell – trombone
- Dennis Wilson – trombone
- Booty Wood – trombone
- Danny Turner – flute, alto saxophone
- Chris Woods – flute, alto saxophone
- Eric Dixon – flute, tenor saxophone
- Eric Schneider – flute, tenor saxophone
- Kenny Hing – tenor saxophone
- John Williams – baritone saxophone
- Joe Pass – guitar
- Cleveland Eaton – double bass
- Dennis Mackrel – drums

Production

- Norman Granz – producer
- Akira Taguchi – producer
- Allen Sides – engineer
- Alan Yoshida – mastering
- Phil DeLancie – remixing
