= Kansas City 8: Get Together =

Studio album by Count Basie
- Released: 1979
- Recorded: September 4, 1979
- Genre: Jazz
- Length: 43:41
- Label: Pablo
- Producer: Norman Granz

Count Basie chronology
A Perfect Match (1979)	Kansas City 8: Get Together (1979)	Kansas City Shout (1980)

Professional ratings
Review scores
Source	Rating
AllMusic	3/5 stars
The Penguin Guide to Jazz Recordings	3/4 stars
Windsor Star	B

Kansas City 8: Get Together is a 1979 studio album by Count Basie.

== Track listing ==
1. "Ode to Pres" (Clark Terry) – 4:07
2. "Basie's Bag" (Count Basie, Ernie Wilkins) – 9:45
3. "Swinging on the Cusp" (Terry) – 5:41
4. "Like It Used to Be" (Basie) – 8:29
5. "My Main Men" (Basie) – 6:10
6. "Pretty Time: "I Can't Get Started"/"What Will I Tell My Heart"/"Talk of the Town"/"I Can't Give You Anything But Love"/"I'm Confessin' (That I Love You)" (Ira Gershwin, Vernon Duke)/(Irving Gordon, Jack Lawrence, Peter Tinturin)/(Jimmy McHugh, Dorothy Fields)(Doc Daugherty, Al J. Neiburg, Ellis Reynolds) – 9:35

== Personnel ==
- Count Basie – piano
- Budd Johnson – baritone saxophone, tenor saxophone
- Eddie "Lockjaw" Davis – tenor saxophone
- Clark Terry – trumpet, flugelhorn
- Harry "Sweets" Edison – trumpet
- Freddie Green – guitar
- John Clayton – double bass
- Gus Johnson – drums
