= Digital III at Montreux =

Live album by Ella Fitzgerald
- Released: 1979
- Recorded: July 12, 1979
- Genre: Jazz
- Length: 42:47
- Label: Pablo
- Producer: Norman Granz

Ella Fitzgerald chronology
Fine and Mellow (1979)	Digital III at Montreux (1979)	A Classy Pair (1979)

Joe Pass chronology
I Remember Charlie Parker (1979)	Digital III at Montreux (1979)	Night Child (1979)

Professional ratings
Review scores
Source	Rating
AllMusic	3/5 stars
The Penguin Guide to Jazz Recordings	3/4 stars

Digital III at Montreux is a 1979 live album featuring a compilation of performances by Ella Fitzgerald, Count Basie, Niels-Henning Ørsted Pedersen, Joe Pass, and Ray Brown, recorded at the 1979 Montreux Jazz Festival. It was produced and has liner notes by Norman Granz. The cover photo is by Phil Stern.

This is one of four albums featuring Fitzgerald at the Montreux Jazz Festival and is Fitzgerald's third Montreux appearance to be released on record. The remainder of Fitzgerald's Montreux performance of this year was released on the 1979 album A Perfect Match.

Ella's performance on this album won her the 1982 Grammy Award for Best Jazz Vocal Performance, Female.

== Track listing ==
1. "I Can't Get Started" (Vernon Duke, Ira Gershwin) – 3:47
2. "Good Mileage" (Dennis Wilson) – 7:17
3. "I Don't Stand a Ghost of a Chance with You" (Bing Crosby, Ned Washington, Victor Young) – 3:16
4. "Flying Home" (Benny Goodman, Lionel Hampton, Sydney Robin) – 8:05
5. "I Cover the Waterfront" (Johnny Green, Edward Heyman) – 3:49
6. "Lil' Darlin'" (Neal Hefti) – 4:41
7. "In Your Own Sweet Way" (Dave Brubeck) – 7:01
8. "Oleo" (Sonny Rollins) – 4:51

== Personnel ==
Recorded July 12, 1979, in Montreux, Switzerland:

- Tracks 1–2

The Count Basie Orchestra

  - Count Basie – piano
  - Danny Turner – alto sax
  - Bobby Plater – alto sax
  - Eric Dixon – tenor sax
  - Kenny Hing – tenor sax
  - Charlie Fowlkes – baritone saxophone
  - Ray Brown – trumpet
  - Pete Minger – trumpet
  - Sonny Cohn – trumpet
  - Paul Cohen – trumpet
  - Mitchell 'Booty' Wood – trombone
  - Bill Hughes – trombone
  - Mel Wanzo – trombone
  - Dennis Wilson – trombone
  - Freddie Green – guitar
  - John Clayton – double bass
  - Butch Miles – drums
- Tracks 3–4
  - Ella Fitzgerald – vocals
  - Paul Smith – piano
  - Freddie Green – guitar
  - Keter Betts – double bass
  - Micky Roker – drums
- Tracks 5–6
  - Joe Pass – guitar
- Tracks 7–8
  - Joe Pass – guitar
  - Niels-Henning Ørsted Pedersen – double bass
