= Jay Saunders =

- Born: June 29, 1944 (age 82)
- Genre: Big band jazz
- Occupations: Collegiate educator, big band trumpeter
- Instrument: Trumpet

Jay Saunders (né John Henry Saunders III; born 29 June 1944) is an American trumpeter and music educator at the collegiate level. In the 1970s, Saunders was a lead trumpeter with big bands — notably the Stan Kenton Orchestra (early seventies) — and a session musician in the Dallas area. Saunders recently retired from the faculty at the University of North Texas College of Music where he taught jazz trumpet, jazz recordings, and directed the One O'Clock Lab Band.

== Education ==
Saunders was born in Sacramento, California. He attended the University of North Texas College of Music from 1965 to 1968, where he studied trumpet with John Haynie (1924–2014). Saunders was a member of the One O'Clock Lab Band, served as an undergraduate teaching assistant in trumpet, and played two short tours with the Stan Kenton Orchestra. After earning a bachelor of music degree in 1968, Saunders played lead trumpet in the Studio Band (now called the "Jazz Ambassadors") of the United States Army Field Band in Washington, DC, from 1968 to 1971. Upon discharge from the U.S. Army, he immediately rejoined the Kenton Orchestra in July 1971, eventually playing lead trumpet until the fall of 1972. That fall, Saunders returned to the UNT College of Music to work on his master's degree. While there, he served as a graduate assistant teacher of trumpet and lab bands until the summer of 1975. He earned a master of music education degree in fall 1974.

His tenures with the Army Studio Band (1968–71) and Kenton (1971–72) coincided closely with those of Ray Brown — a composer, arranger, trumpet player, and jazz educator, who while with the Kenton Orchestra, held the jazz trumpet chair.

== Applied music ==
Saunders played lead trumpet and toured with the Stan Kenton Orchestra and the Studio Band of the United States Army Field Band at Fort Meade, Maryland. Saunders played off and on with the Kenton band for many years and taught at Kenton clinics. He recorded 11 albums with Kenton and one album each with Ornette Coleman and Doc Severinsen, as well as many religious, Latino, and rock artists.

As a member of the Jerry Gray Orchestra at the Fairmont Hotel's Venetian Room, Saunders backed noted artists, including Sarah Vaughan, Billy Eckstine, Tony Bennett, and Ella Fitzgerald, and hundreds of other well-established performers. He has been an educator/performer in the Dallas–Fort Worth area since the 1980s, performing with the Fort Worth and Dallas Symphony Orchestras as part of their Pops Series, playing first trumpet for the Dallas Summer Musicals, and a variety of recordings and shows in the area.

Saunders has been heard playing lead trumpet on broadcasts for the BBC, VOA, WABC, KABC, WNBC, WCBS and for the CNN/SI, CNN, HBO, ESPN Radio, Warner Bros., and Paramount TV themes, in addition to many other broadcasters in the United States. As an educator, Saunders has taught at Richland College, Tarrant County College, Texas Wesleyan University, Collin College, and the University of North Texas College of Music.

He also plays with Pete Petersen and the Collection Jazz Orchestra. "He has a reputation as being one of the best," said Petersen of Saunders. Petersen told the Fort Worth Star-Telegram that he had needed a trumpet player for the recording of Playing in the Park in the mid-1980s. Saunders continues to play with them. The band went on to record two other albums.

== Selected discography ==
As a trumpeter with the Stan Kenton Orchestra

- Live at Brigham Young University (1972); OCLC 39644362
- The Four Freshmen: Live at Butler University, with Stan Kenton and his Orchestra, Creative World Inc. (two LPs, quadraphonic), 1972; re-released by GNP Crescendo Records (CDs) (1986); OCLC 24482461
- Stan Kenton Today (recorded live, Fairfield Halls, Croydon, Surrey, UK, February 10, 1972, 2nd show), originally released in 1972 by Creative World Inc. (2 LPs, quadraphonic), re-released by Dutton Vocalion (2 CDs) (2005); OCLC 4394288

Selections (Videos) from a Feb 6, 1972, live audience BBC recording (same band):

1. "Chiapas," on YouTube by Hank Levy (1927–2001)
2. "A Little Minor Booze," on YouTube by Willie Maiden (1928–1976)
3. "MacCarthur Park," on YouTube by Jimmy Webb (1946– ), arranged by Dee Barton (1937–2001)
4. "The Peanut Vendor," on YouTube (El Manisero) — featuring the trumpet section, by Moises Simons (1889–1945), arranged by Pete Rugolo (1915–2011)
5. "Intermission Riff," on YouTube by Ray Wetzel (1924–1951)
- Rhapsody in Blue (1972); OCLC 31016788
- National Anthems Of The World, Creative World Inc. (2 LPs, quadraphonic) (1972); OCLC 6157999
- 7.5 on the Richter Scale (1973); OCLC 4840206
- Street of Dreams (1991); OCLC 475098342
- Live at Newport Jazz Festival (1999); OCLC 46477173

As a trumpeter with Pete Petersen and the Collection Jazz Orchestra

- Playin' in the Park (1989); OCLC 26130924
- Straight Ahead (1990); OCLC 22844310
- Night & Day (1996); OCLC 57572182

With Doc Severinsen

- Night Journey, originally released 1976, re-released Nov 10, 2009, by Wounded Bird Records (CD); OCLC 5341472

As director of the Two O'Clock Lab Band

- Too Two (2009) CD; (OCLC 501844351)
- Under The Radar (2010) CD; OCLC 826299225
1. "The Beat in Progress" on YouTube, by Brett McDonald (saxophonists on the recording)
2. "Just Friends" on YouTube, arranged by Sean Nelson (lead trombonist on the recording)
3. "Beautiful Love" on YouTube, arranged by Sean Nelson (lead trombonist on the recording)
4. "Sir Louis John Pinkerton's Express" on YouTube, by Thomas Davis (lead trumpeter on the recording)
- Two Twos (2011–12) 2 CDS
- Kind of Two (2013) CD

== Family ==
On January 27, 1968, Jay married Patricia Lynn Bode, who, in 1968, earned a Bachelor of Music from the University of North Texas College of Music. Jay and Pat have a son, Stephen Kenton Saunders (born 1972).
