= Booty Wood =

American jazz trombonist (1919–1987)

- Born: Mitchell W. Wood; December 27, 1919; Wedowee, Alabama, U.S.
- Died: July 10, 1987 (aged 67) Dayton, Ohio, U.S.
- Genre: Jazz
- Occupation: Musician
- Instrument: Trombone
- Years active: 1930s–1980s
- Label: Black & Blue
- Formerly of: Tiny Bradshaw; Lionel Hampton; Arnett Cobb; Erskine Hawkins; Count Basie Orchestra; Duke Ellington

Mitchell W. "Booty" Wood (December 27, 1919 – June 10, 1987) was an American jazz trombonist.

== Career ==
Wood played professionally as a trombonist from the late 1930s. He worked with Tiny Bradshaw and Lionel Hampton in the 1940s before joining the U.S. Navy during World War II. While there, he played in a band with Clark Terry, Willie Smith, and Gerald Wilson. After his service, he returned to play with Hampton, then worked with Arnett Cobb (1947–1948), Erskine Hawkins (1948–1950), and the Count Basie Orchestra (1951).

He spent a few years outside music, then played with Duke Ellington in 1959–1960 and again in 1963; he returned once more early in the 1970s. He again played with Count Basie from 1979 into the middle of the following decade.

== Discography ==
=== As leader ===
- Chelsea Bridge (Black & Blue, 1998)

=== As sideman ===
With Count Basie and His Orchestra

- Digital III at Montreux (Pablo, 1979) – with Ella Fitzgerald and Joe Pass; first two tracks only
- Kansas City Shout (Pablo, 1980)
- On the Road (Pablo, 1980)
- Warm Breeze (Pablo, 1981)
- Farmer's Market Barbecue (Pablo, 1982)
- 88 Basie Street (Pablo, 1983)
- Fancy Pants (Pablo, 1986)

With Duke Ellington

- Blues in Orbit (Columbia, 1960)
- Swinging Suites by Edward E. and Edward G. (Columbia, 1961)
- The Nutcracker Suite (Columbia, 1960)
- Piano in the Background (CBS, 1960)
- My People (Contact, 1965)
- New Orleans Suite (Atlantic, 1970)
- The London Concert (United Artists, 1972)
- Memorial (CBS, 1974)
- The Afro-Eurasian Eclipse (Fantasy, 1975)
- The Ellington Suites (Pablo, 1976)
- Hot Summer Dance (Red Baron, 1991)

With Ella Fitzgerald

- A Perfect Match (Pablo, 1979) – with the Count Basie Orchestra
- A Classy Pair (Pablo, 1979) – with the Count Basie Orchestra

With others

- Harry Carney, Rock Me Gently (Metronome, 1961)
- Arnett Cobb, Arnett Blows for 1300 (Delmark, 1994)
- Paul Gonsalves, Ellingtonia Moods and Blues (RCA, 1960)
- Johnny Hodges, The Smooth One (Verve, 1979)
- Norris Turney, I Let a Song... (Black & Blue, 1978)
- Sarah Vaughan, Send in the Clowns (Pablo, 1981)
