= Ain't Misbehavin' (Clark Terry album) =

Studio album by Clark Terry
- Released: 1979
- Recorded: March 15–16, 1979
- Genre: Jazz
- Length: 33:15
- Label: Pablo Today
- Producer: Norman Granz

Clark Terry chronology
Funk Dumplin's (1978)	Ain't Misbehavin' (1979)	Clark Terry Live in Chicago (1979)

Professional ratings
Review scores
Source	Rating
Allmusic	4/5 stars

Ain't Misbehavin' is a 1979 album by Clark Terry, focusing on the music on Fats Waller. Terry is joined by pianist Oscar Peterson and the singer Johnny Hartman.

== Track listing ==
1. "Jitterbug Waltz" (Richard Maltby, Jr., Fats Waller) – 5:41
2. "Your Feet's Too Big" (Ada Benson, Fred Fisher) – 5:40
3. "Honeysuckle Rose" (Andy Razaf, Waller) – 3:09
4. "Mean to Me" (Fred E. Ahlert, Roy Turk) – 2:45
5. "It's a Sin to Tell a Lie" (Billy Mayhew) – 4:10
6. "Ain't Misbehavin'" (Harry Brooks, Razaf, Waller) – 3:05
7. "Squeeze Me" (Waller, Clarence Williams) – 4:20
8. "Handful of Keys" (Murrary Horwitz, Maltby, Waller) – 4:19
9. "Black and Blue" (Brooks, Razaf, Waller) – 2:29
10. "I Can't Give You Anything But Love" (Dorothy Fields, Jimmy McHugh) – 4:19
11. "The Joint Is Jumpin'" (J. C. Johnson, Razaf, Waller) – 2:52

== Personnel ==
- Clark Terry – trumpet, flugelhorn, vocals
- Johnny Hartman – vocals
- Oscar Peterson – piano
- Victor Sproles – double bass
- Billy Hart – drums
- Chris Woods – flute, alto saxophone
