= Mostly Blues...and Some Others =

Studio album by Count Basie
- Released: 1986
- Recorded: June 22, 1983
- Genre: Jazz
- Length: 44:42
- Label: Pablo
- Producer: Norman Granz

Count Basie chronology
Me and You (1983)	Mostly Blues...and Some Others (1986)	Fancy Pants (1983)

Professional ratings
Review scores
Source	Rating
Allmusic	2.5/5 stars
The Penguin Guide to Jazz Recordings	3/4 stars

Mostly Blues...and Some Others is a 1983 studio album by Count Basie. This was his last small-group recording. It was released in 1986, two years after his death in 1984.

== Track listing ==
1. "I'll Always Be in Love with You" (Bud Green, Ruby, Sam H. Stept) – 5:57
(Note: the actual length of "I'll Always Be in Love with You" is 08:13 in spite of the official Pablo information)
2. "Snooky" (Count Basie) – 3:42
3. "Blues for Charlie Christian" (Basie) – 5:24
4. "Jaws" (Basie) – 5:34
5. "I'm Confessin' (That I Love You)" (Doc Daugherty, Al J. Neiburg, Ellis Reynolds) – 4:29
6. "I Want a Little Girl" (Murray Mencher, Billy Moll) – 4:58
7. "Blues in C" (Louis Bellson, Benny Carter, Art Tatum) – 6:58
8. "Brio" (Basie, Joe Pass) – 4:42

== Personnel ==
- Count Basie - piano
- Eddie "Lockjaw" Davis - tenor saxophone
- Snooky Young - trumpet
- Freddie Green - guitar
- Joe Pass - guitar
- John Heard - double bass
- Roy McCurdy - drums

Known as "The Kansas City Septem"
