= Fred Ford (musician) =

American musician (1930–1999)

Fred "Sweet Daddy Goodlow" Ford (February 14, 1930 – November 26, 1999) was an American blues and jazz artist, composer, arranger and educator. Ford was born in Memphis, Tennessee, to Boss Fred Ford and Nancy Taylor Ford.

Known mostly for his baritone saxophone skills, Ford began his musical career in 1943 on clarinet at Frederick Douglass High School, as a part of the Douglass Swingsters Orchestra and the Andrew Chaplin Band, with influence by the Memphis born bandleader, Jimmie Lunceford.

== Career ==
Ford's first professional gig was at 'The Barn' in the Hyde Park section of Memphis. He continued honing his musical skills around Memphis at the 'Hotel Men's Improvement Club' (later called the Flamingo Room at Gayoso and Beale), The Elks Club, Mitchell's Domino Lounge (later known as Club Handy) and Club Paradise. Ford began traveling on the road and playing saxophone gigs with Johnny Hodges, Earl Bostic, Paul Desmond, Pete Brown, and Benny Carter.

As a leader in the Johnny Otis Band, Ford performed at such venues as the Apollo Theater in Harlem, The Earl Theater in Philadelphia, the Howard Theater in Washington, D.C., the 5-4 Ballroom in Los Angeles and Club Rivera in St. Louis. From the 1950s to 1976 he worked through the booking agency of Don D. Robey of Peacock Records, based in Houston, Texas. It was there that Ford recorded with Clarence "Gatemouth" Brown, Marie Anderson, and Big Mama Thornton where on her original recording of "Hound Dog" - later famous by Elvis Presley - Ford was heard as the barking/howling dog. Ford continued to tour and record with B. B. King, Esther Phillips, Lightnin' Hopkins and Junior Parker. He also recorded with Jerry Lee Lewis and Charlie Rich at Sam Phillips' Sun Studio and at the Stax Music Studios with Rufus Thomas on "Do the Funky Chicken."

=== Producer ===
As a record producer, Ford was behind the jazz pianist Phineas Newborn, Jr.’s 1974 album, Solo Piano, which won a Grammy nomination. In 1979, they went to the Montreaux Jazz Festival and other European venues, accompanied by the writer Stanley Booth. In 1978 at Sam Phillips' studio, Ford produced Vanilla, the homecoming album of actress Cybill Shepherd, featuring the Beale Street USA Orchestra and Newborn Jr.

=== Trio ===
In the 1980s, Ford’s stature as a jazz musician became more recognized as he formed a jazz trio with the organist/vocalist Robert "Honeymoon" Garner and drummer Bill Tyus. As the Fred Ford-Honeymoon Garner Trio, they became a favorite of the annual Memphis Music and Heritage Festival, sponsored by the Center for Southern Folklore. As a jazz musician, Ford worked with Charlie Rich on Rich's last single, "Pictures and Paintings." Ford was also featured in a 1984 Charlie Rich YouTube video for "Lonely Weekends".

== POBAM ==
Ford and his friend and musician/educator, Emerson Able, formed POBAM, (Preservation of Black American Music) with the aim of keeping jazz and the legacy of black jazz musicians alive. In 1982, POBAM became a charter member of the Memphis Black Arts Alliance, Inc., which was organized to nurture artistic excellence and celebrate black heritage.

After diagnosed with lung cancer, Ford became a staunch no smoking advocate encouraging smokers to quit and youngsters not to start.

== Family ==
Ford was the father to twins Jamal and Jamil Ford, who carry on his musical legacy as record producers through their labels and websites, POBAM and WOOKIN. Jacob Ford, the youngest child of Fred Ford, was drafted by the Tennessee Titans in 2007.

Fred Ford died of lung cancer, in November 1999.

== Selected discography ==
- Star Dust / Preaching Jazz (Cover, 1961)
- Blackeyed Rattlesnake / Last Chance (Duke)
- with Willie Mitchell: The Hit Sound (Hi, 1967)
- with Jesse Butler: Memphis Soul (Philips, 1967)
- Madame Honeybuns (1988, Eden)
- with Charlie Wood: Southbound (Go Jazz, 1995)

== See also ==
- List of jazz arrangers

== Sources ==
- It came from Memphis By Robert Gordon, Peter Guralnick
- Center for Southern Folklore - Content Guide,
- Bobby LaVell | Bobby LaVell and the Hudson River Jazz Orchestra
- Cybill Shepherd - Biography,
- Jamil Nassar - Pipl Profiles
- Memphis blues music Walk of Fame brass notes on Beale Street
- Lima's front-row seat: Our part in blues, jazz, rock 'n' roll
- Swampland:Stanley Booth: Can I Get A Witness,
- Amazon.com: Mojo Triangle: Birthplace of Country, Blues, Jazz and ...
- Rollin' and tumblin': the postwar blues guitarists
- Calvin Newborn Biography
- Fred Ford Page in Fuller Up, The Dead Musicians Directory
- Rollin' and tumblin': the postwar blues guitarists
