= Me and You (Count Basie album) =

Studio album by Count Basie
- Released: 1983
- Recorded: 1983
- Genre: Jazz
- Length: 41:33
- Label: Pablo
- Producer: Norman Granz

Count Basie chronology
88 Basie Street (1981)	Me and You (1983)	Mostly Blues...and Some Others (1983)

Professional ratings
Review scores
Source	Rating
AllMusic	3/5 stars
The Penguin Guide to Jazz Recordings	3/4 stars
The Rolling Stone Jazz Record Guide	3/5 stars

Me and You is a 1983 studio album by Count Basie and his Orchestra.

== Track listing ==
1. "Mr. Softie" (Nat Pierce) – 5:39
2. "Moten Swing" (Benny Moten) – 5:29
3. "She's Funny That Way" (Neil Moret, Richard A. Whiting) – 4:20
4. "Right on, Right On" (Ernie Wilkins) – 4:45
5. "Me and You" (Wilkins) – 4:15
6. "Crip" (Count Basie) – 7:16
7. "Bridge Work" (Basie) – 4:55
8. "Easy Living" (Ralph Rainger, Leo Robin) – 4:54

== Personnel ==
- Count Basie - piano
- Sonny Cohn - trumpet
- Dale Carley
- Steven Furtado
- Bob Summers
- Frank Szabo
- Bill Hughes - trombone
- Grover Mitchell
- Dennis Wilson
- Mitchell "Booty" Wood
- Danny Turner - alto saxophone
- Chris Woods
- Eric Dixon - tenor saxophone
- Eric Schneider
- Johnny Williams - baritone saxophone
- Freddie Green - guitar
- Cleveland Eaton - double bass
- Dennis Mackrel - drums
- Ernie Wilkins - arranger, conductor
