= Basie Jam =

Studio album by Count Basie
- Released: 1974
- Recorded: 1973
- Genre: Jazz
- Length: 48:24
- Label: Pablo
- Producer: Norman Granz

Count Basie chronology
Have a Nice Day (1971)	Basie Jam (1974)	The Bosses (1973)

Professional ratings
Review scores
Source	Rating
AllMusic	2/5 stars
The Penguin Guide to Jazz Recordings	3/4 stars
The Rolling Stone Jazz Record Guide	4/5 stars

Basie Jam is a 1973 studio album by Count Basie. This was Basie's first album with Norman Granz' newly founded Pablo Records.

== Track listing ==
All music composed by Count Basie.

1. "Doubling Blues" – 6:58
2. "Hanging Out" – 9:35
3. "Red Bank Blues" – 9:03
4. "One-Nighter" – 11:45
5. "Freeport Blues" – 11:44

== Personnel ==
- Count Basie - organ, piano
- Eddie "Lockjaw" Davis - tenor saxophone
- Zoot Sims
- J.J. Johnson - trombone
- Harry "Sweets" Edison - trumpet
- Irving Ashby - guitar
- Ray Brown - double bass
- Louie Bellson - drums
