= The Bosses =

Studio album by Big Joe Turner, Count Basie
- Released: 1973
- Recorded: 1973
- Genre: Vocal jazz
- Length: 43:59
- Label: Pablo
- Producer: Norman Granz

Big Joe Turner chronology
| Flip, Flop & Fly (1972) | The Bosses (1973) | Life Ain't Easy (1974) |

Count Basie chronology
| Basie Jam (1973) | The Bosses (1973) | Basie Big Band (1975) |

The Bosses is a 1973 album by American blues shouter "Big Joe" Turner accompanied by a small group led by Count Basie. It was recorded in 1973 and released on the Pablo label.

== Reception ==
Professional ratings
Review scores
| Source | Rating |
|---|---|
| AllMusic | 4/5 stars |
| The Penguin Guide to Jazz Recordings | 3/4 stars |

An AllMusic review by Scott Yanow stated that it was one of Turner's better late-period albums. The review also stated that he was on top form on "Night Time Is the Right Time," "Wee Baby Blues," and "Roll 'Em Pete".

== Track listing ==
1. "The Honeydripper" (Joe Liggins) - 6:42
2. "Honey Hush" (Nat King Cole, Big Joe Turner, Lou Willie Turner) - 2:37
3. "Cherry Red" (Pete Johnson, Big Joe Turner) - 4:42
4. "Night Time Is the Right Time" (Leroy Carr, Lew Herman) - 3:54
5. "Blues Around the Clock" (Willie Bryant) - 4:58
6. "Since I Fell for You" (Buddy Johnson) - 3:55
7. "Flip, Flop and Fly" (Chuck Calhoun, Lou Willie Turner) - 3:28
8. "Wee Baby Blues" (Johnson, Big Joe Turner) - 5:37
9. "Good Morning Blues" (Count Basie, Eddie Durham, Jimmy Rushing) - 3:50
10. "Roll 'Em Pete" (Johnson, Turner) - 4:16

== Personnel ==
- Big Joe Turner - vocals
- Count Basie - piano
- Irving Ashby - guitar
- Ray Brown - double bass
- Louis Bellson - drums
- Harry "Sweets" Edison - trumpet
- J.J. Johnson - trombone
- Eddie "Lockjaw" Davis - tenor saxophone
- Zoot Sims - tenor saxophone
