= Chris Woods (saxophonist) =

American jazz saxophonist (1925–1985)

- Born: December 25, 1925; Memphis, Tennessee, United States
- Died: July 4, 1985 (aged 59) New York City, New York
- Genres: Jazz
- Occupation: Musician
- Instrument: Alto saxophone
- Labels: Town and Country; Miracle; States
- Formerly of: Jeter-Pillars Orchestra

Chris Woods (December 25, 1925, Memphis, Tennessee – July 4, 1985, New York City) was an American jazz alto saxophonist.

Woods played locally in Memphis early in his career before moving to St. Louis to play with the Jeter-Pillars Orchestra and trumpeter George Hudson. He then joined Tommy Dean's combo, recording with them for Town and Country, Miracle, and States. Striking out on his own, he first recorded as a leader in 1953 for United Records. In 1962 he moved to New York, where he played with Dizzy Gillespie, Clark Terry, Sy Oliver, and Ted Curson. He continued working with Terry into the 1970s, playing flute at times in his Big Bad Band. Jim McNeely played as a sideman on his 1978 release for Delmark Records. In 1983 he began playing in the Count Basie Orchestra, where he worked until his death in 1985.

== Discography ==
- Somebody Done Stole My Blues (Delmark, 1976)
- Modus Operandi (Delmark, 1978)

=== As sideman ===
With Count Basie

- Me and You (Pablo, 1983)
- 88 Basie Street (Pablo, 1984)
- Fancy Pants (Pablo, 1986)

With Ernie Wilkins

- Blood, Sweat & Brass (Mainstream, 1970)
- Hard Mother Blues (Mainstream, 1970)
- Screaming Mothers (Mainstream, 1974)

With others

- Carla Bley, Escalator over the Hill (JCOA, 1971)
- Ted Curson, Cattin' Curson (Marge, 1975)
- Ted Curson, Jubilant Power (Inner City, 1977)
- Les DeMerle, Spectrum (United Artists, 1969)
- Dizzy Gillespie, The Dizzy Gillespie Reunion Big Band (MPS, 1969)
- George Masso, No Frills Just Music (Famous Door, 1984)
- Charles McPherson, Today's Man (Mainstream, 1973)
- Butch Miles, Butch Miles Swings Some Standards (Famous Door, 1981)
- Blue Mitchell, Booty (Mainstream, 1974)
- Sy Oliver, Yes Indeed (Black and Blue, 1973)
- Clark Terry, Live! at Buddy's Place (Vanguard, 1976)
- Clark Terry, Ain't Misbehavin' (Pablo, 1979)
- Charles Williams, Stickball (Mainstream, 1972)
