= Adrian Fry =

British freelance jazz trombonist, arranger and composer

Adrian Fry is a British freelance jazz trombonist, arranger and composer. He performed and recorded with many British bands including Back to Basie, Frank Griffith Nonet & Big Band, Elio Pace, Karen Sharp Quintet, the Stan Tracey Big Band, the Michael Garrick Jazz Orchestra, the Don Weller Electric Octet & Big Band, the Pasadena Roof Orchestra, Bone Supremacy, and Pete Cater's Ministry of Jazz. His credits as a session musician include work with Albert Lee, Incognito, Katrina Leskanich and Shakin' Stevens. In 2010, he was assistant musical director on BBC Radio 2's Weekend Wogan.

== See also ==
- List of jazz arrangers
