= Six-String Soldiers =

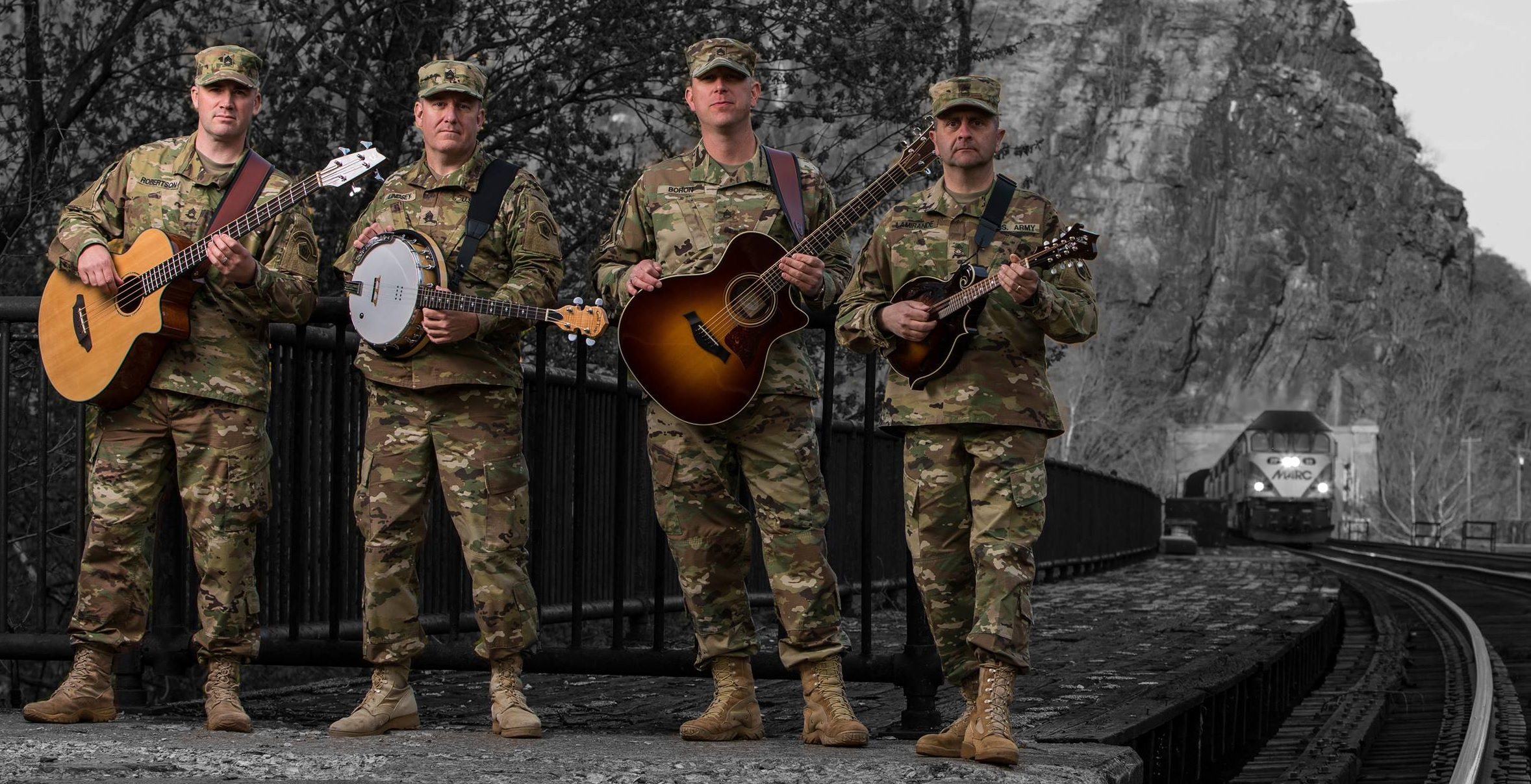
- Six-String Soldiers pictured in 2016
- Active: 2014–present
- Country: United States
- Branch: United States Army
- Type: Military band
- Role: Morale, Welfare and Recreation
- Part of: United States Army Field Band
- Garrison/HQ: Fort George G. Meade
- Instrumentation: Guitar, fiddle, mandolin, banjo, acoustic bass guitar
- Website: official page

Commanders
- Officer in Charge: CWO Daniel Wood
- Element Leader: MSG Peter Krasulski

The Six-String Soldiers is a component unit of the United States Army Field Band responsible for performing contemporary American folk music genres, principally including bluegrass and country, as well as acoustic covers of popular songs. Posted to Fort George G. Meade in Maryland, it consists of five performing personnel plus support staff.

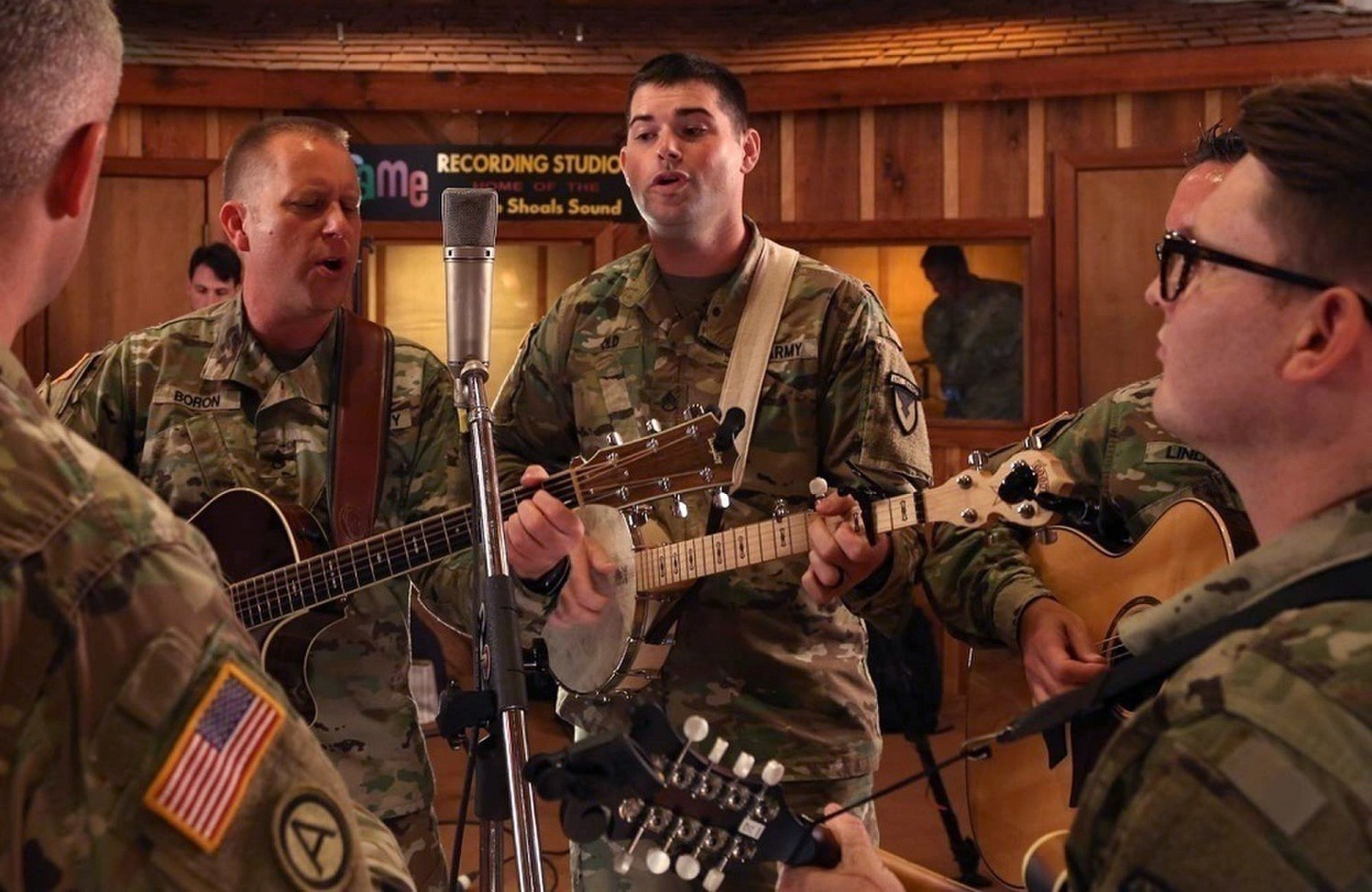
Six-String Soldiers personnel at a 2018 recording session at FAME Studios in Alabama

== History ==
Activated in May 2014, the ensemble first achieved widespread attention during Boston's February 2015 snowstorm when weather forced it to cancel a planned appearance in that city. The quartet, instead, filmed a video outside their hotel performing George Harrison's "Here Comes the Sun" which quickly accumulated nearly nine million views on Facebook.

Six-String Soldiers has performed with Darryl Worley, Harry Connick Jr., The Irish Rovers, the University of Massachusetts Minuteman Marching Band, and has opened for Creedence Clearwater Revival's John Fogerty. On November 10, 2017, it performed on the floor of the New York Stock Exchange prior to the closing bell and its broadcast appearances have included HLN's Morning Express with Robin Meade, KTLA-TV and WPIX-TV, among others. In 2016, Sports Illustrated's Andy Gray called Six-String Soldiers his "new favorite band" for its acoustic cover of "Strawberry Fields Forever".

In 2016 Six-String Soldiers released its first album, which was composed of seven original songs and four covers. The album, I've Been There, was produced by Bill Kirchen and engineered by Todd Whitelock. It plans a second album release in 2019.

The Six-String Soldiers perform the "Star-Spangled Banner" in 2015

== Organization ==
Posted to Fort George G. Meade in Maryland, the group tours within the United States and internationally to support recruitment efforts by the United States Army and to entertain both deployed Army personnel and patients at United States Department of Veterans Affairs hospitals. It has alternated between four and five members. As of 2018, instrumentation includes guitar, mandolin, banjo, acoustic bass guitar, and fiddle.

== See also ==
- Old Guard Fife and Drum Corps
- United States Army Band
- West Point Band
