= United States Army Field Band =

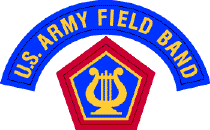
- U.S. Army Field Band shoulder sleeve insignia
- Active: 1946 – present
- Country: United States of America
- Branch: United States Army
- Type: Military band
- Part of: United States Army Military District of Washington
- Garrison/HQ: Fort George G. Meade
- Decorations: Superior Unit Award with Oak Leaf
- Website: https://www.armyfieldband.com/

Commanders
- Current commander: LTC Domingos Robinson
- Deputy Commander: MAJ Richard Winkels
- Associate Bandmaster: CPT Curran Schenck
- Bandmaster: CW3 Alexander Davis
- Command Sergeant Major: CSM Matthew Kanowith

Insignia
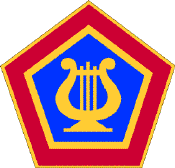
- Distinctive unit insignia

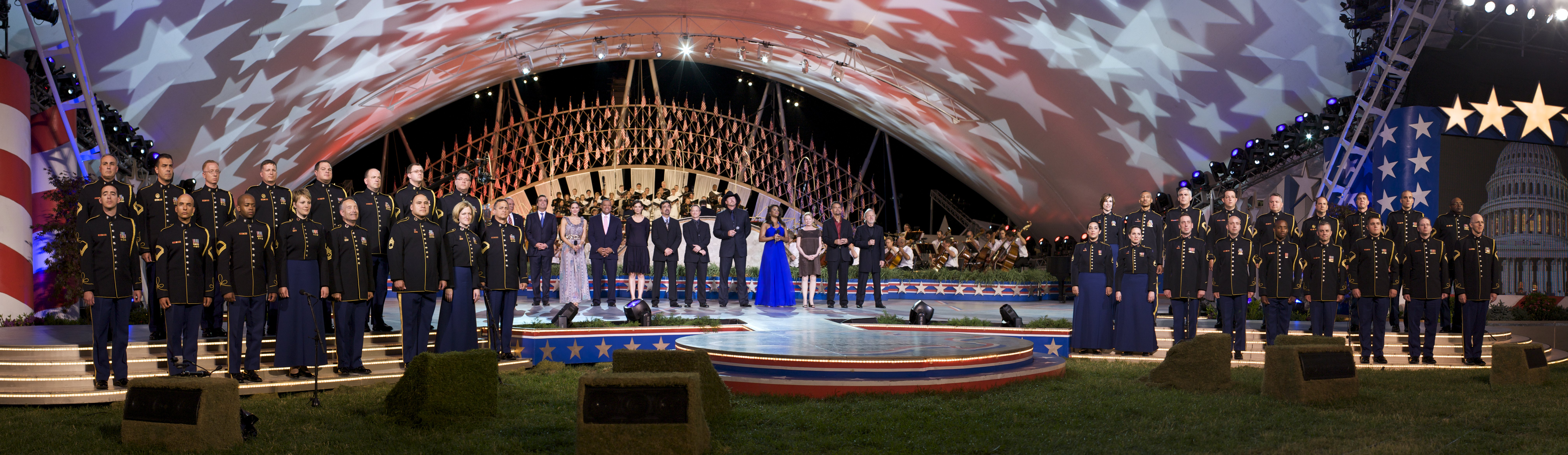
The chorus of the Army Field Band performing alongside celebrities at the 2009 National Memorial Day Concert

Garryowen
Garryowen, a traditional march of the U.S. cavalry, performed by the Army Field Band

The United States Army Field Band of Washington, D.C. is a touring musical organization of the United States Army Military District of Washington. It performs more than 400 concerts per year and has performed in all 50 states of the United States and in 25 countries. Stationed at Fort George G. Meade, Maryland, the Army Field Band consists of five performing components: the Concert Band, the Soldiers' Chorus, the Jazz Ambassadors, the Six-String Soldiers, and the Commercial Music Group, which includes the Army Rappers.

Every four years, the Band leads the first element of the Presidential Inaugural Parade. It has also appeared at The Kennedy Center Honors, three World Series, the Baltimore Orioles' annual home finale, the 1995 Presidential Commemoration of the 50th Anniversary of V-J Day, the 40th Anniversary of D-Day in Normandy, the National Memorial Day Concert, the state funerals of Presidents Reagan and Ford, and the 2002 Winter Olympic Games.

== History ==
The Field Band was established in 1946 by Lieutenant General Jacob L. Devers, Commanding General of U.S. Army Ground Forces, with the aim of maintaining the link between the United States Army and American public established during World War Two by organisations such as United Service Organizations and the First Combat Infantry Band.

The nucleus of the new organization consisted of musicians from the original First Combat Infantry Band. The new band was named The Army Ground Forces Band. In April 1950, it was renamed the United States Army Field Band.

Their 2020 album, Soundtrack of the American Soldier, won Best Immersive Audio Album at the 63rd Annual Grammy Awards.

== Performing ensembles ==
Tenting on the Old Camp Ground
Tenting on the Old Camp Ground, performed by the Army Field Band concert band and chorus

Since its inception in 1946, The U.S. Army Field Band has evolved from one main performing ensemble into four separate components, including the original Concert Band.

The Soldiers' Chorus had its origins in the early days of the Concert Band, when members would gather in front of the band during shows and serenade the audience. They featured glee club-style choral arrangements of traditional and popular songs. In 1957, the unit began to audition vocalists specifically for the Chorus. The unit's first full-time female soldier-musicians joined the ranks of the Soldiers' Chorus in 1974.

In the early 1960s, the early stages of a permanent big band began to take shape. The Satin Brass and Studio Band were the first big band component, which performed separately from the Concert Band. In 1969, the Studio Band was recognized as a full-fledged performing component, and was later named the Jazz Ambassadors.

The Six-String Soldiers is a six-member band focused on contemporary popular music with an emphasis on bluegrass and country. It was formed in 2014 to replace the former resident bluegrass band, The Volunteers.

== Commanders ==
Ltc. Domingos Robinson (2024–present)

Col. Jim R. Keene (2015–2024)

Ltc. Paul Bamonte (2014–2015) (as acting commander)

Col. Timothy J. Holtan (2011–2014)

Col. Thomas H. Palmatier (2007–2011)

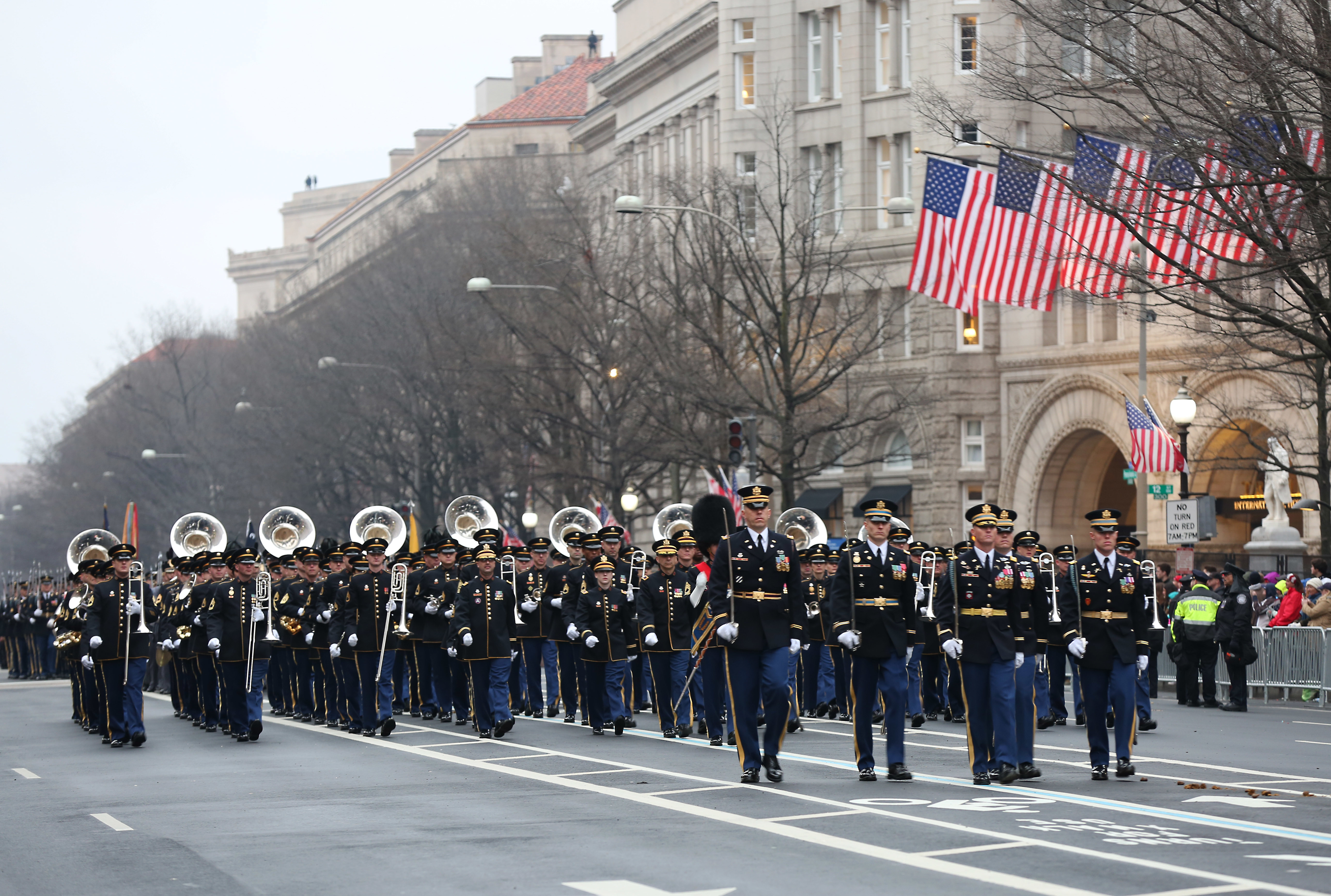
The United States Army Field Band during the 58th Presidential Inauguration in 2017.

Col. Finley R. Hamilton (1999–2007)

Col. Jack Grogan (1991–1999)

Col. William E. Clark (1979–1991)

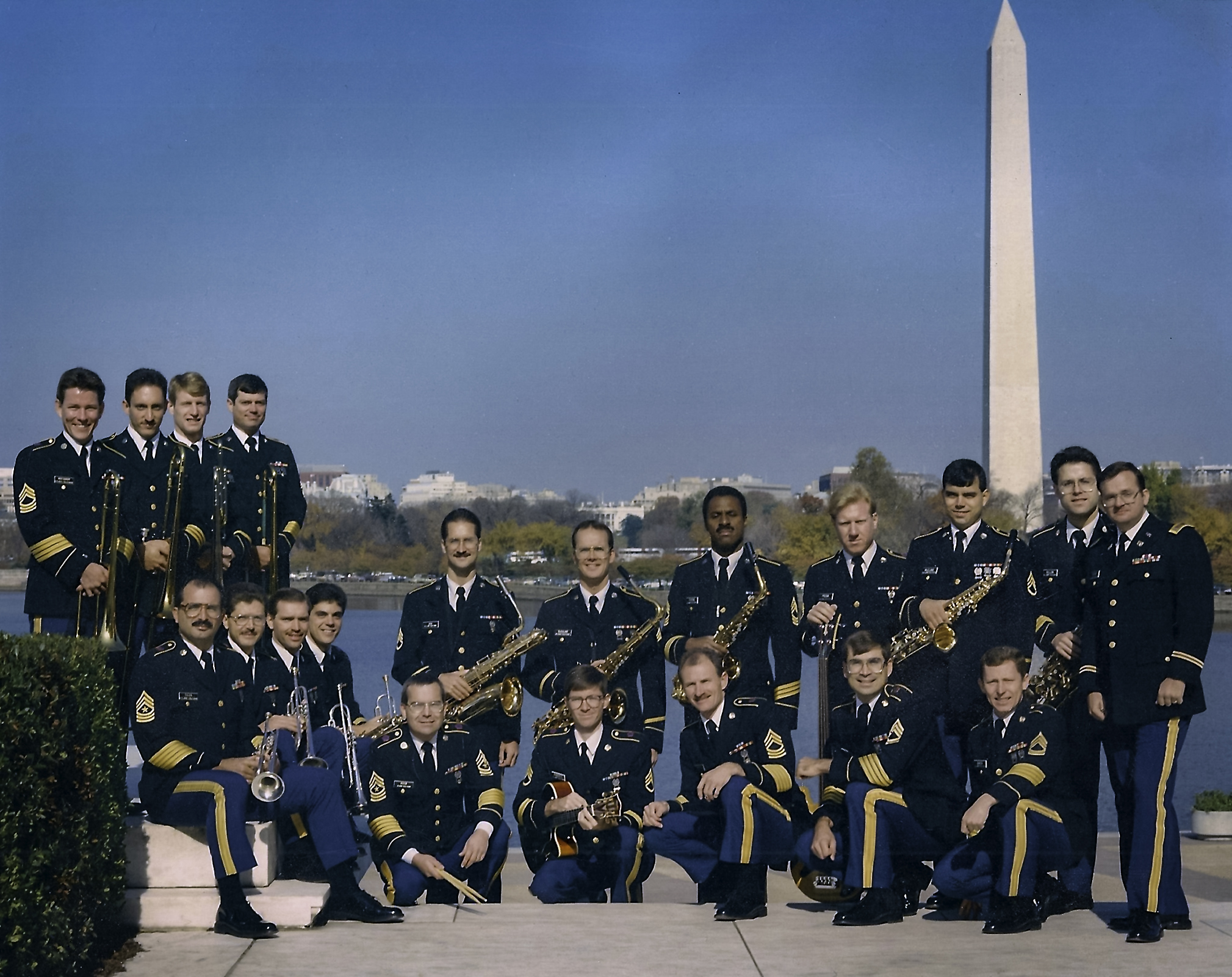
The Jazz Ambassadors 1985–1986

Maj. Samuel J. Fricano (1974–1979)

Ltc. Hal J. Gibson (1968–1974)

Ltc. Wilmont M. Trumbull (1966–1968)

Ltc. Robert L. Bierly (1960–1966)

Ltc. Chester E. Whiting (1946–1960)

== Notable members ==
- Steve Gadd – drums
- Raymond Harry Brown – trumpet/flugelhorn
- Jay Saunders – trumpet/flugelhorn
- Enrico di Giuseppe – tenor
- Joshua Hecht – bass
- Paul Horn – flute
