= Dave Eshelman =

American jazz musician

Dave Eshelman (born 1948) is an American jazz trombonist, composer, arranger, bandleader, and educator in the San Francisco Bay Area. From 1984 to 2007, he served as Director of Jazz Studies at California State University, East Bay, formerly Cal State Hayward.

Eshelman has performed with jazz groups in the Bay Area and has worked as a featured soloist in the big bands of Ray Brown, Joe Henderson, Tito Puente, and Gerald Wilson. His arrangements have been performed by Don Ellis, Stan Kenton, Bill Watrous, Swedish Radio Orchestra, and the Airmen of Note.

In collegiate jazz festivals the California State-East Bay Jazz Ensemble has won first place in over half of the contests it has entered. In 2003 the university named Eshelman Outstanding Professor of the Year, and in 2006 the California Music Educator's Association named him top collegiate music educator in the state for 2007. He was presented with the CMEA/John Swain College/University Educator Award March 15, 2007 at the CMEA State Conference Gala Awards Banquet in Ontario, California.

== See also ==
- List of jazz arrangers.
