= Warm Breeze =

Studio album by Count Basie
- Released: 1981
- Recorded: September 1–2, 1981
- Genre: Jazz
- Length: 42:24
- Label: Pablo Today
- Producer: Norman Granz

Count Basie chronology
Kansas City Shout (1980)	Warm Breeze (1981)	Farmer's Market Barbecue (1982)

Professional ratings
Review scores
Source	Rating
Allmusic	3/5 stars
The Penguin Guide to Jazz Recordings	3/4 stars

Warm Breeze is a 1981 studio album by Count Basie and his orchestra.

At the 25th Grammy Awards, Count Basie won the Grammy Award for Best Jazz Instrumental Performance, Big Band for Warm Breeze.

== Track listing ==
1. "C.B. Express" – 6:05
2. "After the Rain" – 7:15
3. "Warm Breeze" – 6:45
4. "Cookie" – 4:01
5. "Flight to Nassau" – 4:27
6. "How Sweet It Is" – 7:58
7. "Satin Doll" – 5:56

All music composed by Sammy Nestico, except "After the Rain" by Nestico and Michel Legrand, and "Satin Doll" by Duke Ellington, Johnny Mercer and Billy Strayhorn.

== Personnel ==
- Count Basie – piano
- Sonny Cohn - trumpet
- Harry "Sweets" Edison
- Willie Cook
- Dale Carley
- Frank Szabo
- Bob Summers
- Bill Hughes - trombone
- Grover Mitchell
- Dennis Wilson
- Mitchell "Booty" Wood
- Danny Turner - alto saxophone
- Bobby Plater
- Eric Dixon - tenor saxophone
- Kenny Hing
- Johnny Williams - baritone saxophone
- Freddie Green - guitar
- Cleveland Eaton - double bass
- Gregg Field - drums
- Harold Jones
- Sammy Nestico - arranger, conductor
