= Ithaca College School of Music, Theatre, and Dance =

Music school in Ithaca, New York

Coordinates: 42.421003°N 76.495843°W

- Type: Private
- Established: 1892
- Dean: Steve TenEyck
- Students: 650
- Undergraduates: 690
- Postgraduates: 10
- Location: Ithaca, NY, USA
- Campus: Small city
- Website: ithaca.edu/school-music-theatre-and-dance

The School of Music, Theatre, and Dance is the music school at Ithaca College, in Ithaca, New York. It is one of the five schools of the college, taking space in the Dillingham Center and the Whalen Center for Music. Ithaca College was founded by William Egbert in 1892 as a conservatory of music. It had been called the School of Music up until merging with the Department of Theatre Arts in 2022. Since 1941, the School of Music has been accredited by the National Association of Schools of Music.

In 2022, the School of Music at Ithaca College officially combined with the Department of Theatre Arts, leading to the creation of a Division of Music and Division of Theatre and Dance. This led to the renaming of the School of Music to the School of Music, Theatre, and Dance.

From 2022–2024, Anne Hogan served as the first dean for the School of Music, Theatre, and Dance since its merge with the Department of Theatre Arts. She announced her departure from the school in April 2024, and announced that associate deans Steve TenEyck and Luis Loubriel would be taking the spot of interim dean during the search for a new dean.

== Academics ==
The School of Music, Theatre, and Dance offers degree programs in:

=== Undergraduate ===
Department of Music Education

- Music Education (B.Mus.)
- Music Education and Performance (B.M.)

Department of Music Performance

- Performance (B.M.)
- Jazz Studies (B.M.)
- Sound Recording Technology (B.M.)

Department of Music Theory, History, and Composition

- Composition (B.M.)
- Music (B.A.)
- Music in Combination with an Outside Field (B.M.)

Department of Theatre and Dance Performance

- Acting (B.F.A.)
- Musical Theatre (B.F.A.)

Department of Theatre Production and Management

- Stage Management (B.F.A.)
- Theatre Administration (B.S.)
- Theatre Production & Design (B.F.A.)

Department of Theatre Studies

- Theatre Studies (B.A.)

Minors

- Dance
- Music
- Theatre

=== Graduate ===
- Music Education (M.M., M.S.)
