= Farmer's Market Barbecue =

Studio album by Count Basie
- Released: 1982
- Recorded: May 4, 1982
- Genre: Jazz
- Length: 42:24
- Label: Pablo
- Producer: Norman Granz

Count Basie chronology
Warm Breeze (1981)	Farmer's Market Barbecue (1982)	88 Basie Street (1983)

Professional ratings
Review scores
Source	Rating
Allmusic	2.5/5 stars
The Penguin Guide to Jazz Recordings	3/4 stars

Farmer's Market Barbecue is a 1982 studio album by Count Basie and his orchestra.

== Track listing ==
1. "Way Out Basie" (Ernie Wilkins) – 4:24
2. "St. Louis Blues" (W. C. Handy) – 7:17
3. "Beaver Junction" (Harry "Sweets" Edison) – 4:47
4. "Lester Leaps In" (Lester Young) – 5:01
5. "Blues for the Barbecue" (Sonny Cohn) – 10:31
6. "I Don't Know Yet" (Freddie Green) – 4:14
7. "Ain't That Something" (Bobby Plater) – 4:20
8. "Jumpin' at the Woodside" (Count Basie) – 3:25

== Personnel ==
- Count Basie – piano
- Sonny Cohn – trumpet
- Dale Carley
- Chris Albert
- Bob Summers
- Bill Hughes - trombone
- Grover Mitchell
- Dennis Wilson
- Mitchell "Booty" Wood
- Danny Turner – alto saxophone
- Bobby Plater
- Eric Dixon – tenor saxophone
- Kenny Hing
- Johnny Williams – baritone saxophone
- Freddie Green – guitar
- James Leary – double bass
- Gregg Field – drums
