= Fancy Pants (album) =

Studio album by Count Basie
- Released: 1986
- Recorded: 1983
- Genre: Jazz
- Length: 44:42
- Label: Pablo
- Producer: Norman Granz

Count Basie chronology
Mostly Blues...and Some Others (1983)	Fancy Pants (1986)	Long Live the Chief (1986)

Professional ratings
Review scores
Source	Rating
Allmusic	3/5 stars
The Penguin Guide to Jazz Recordings	2.5/4 stars

Fancy Pants is a 1983 studio album by Count Basie and his orchestra. This is the last recording that Basie made with his big band.

== Track listing ==
1. "Put It Right Here" (Louie Bellson, Nestico) – 5:14
2. "By My Side" – 5:18
3. "Blue Chip" – 4:04
4. "Fancy Pants" – 4:27
5. "Hi-Five" – 6:00
6. "Time Stream" – 4:11
7. "Samantha" – 4:29
8. "Strike Up the Band" (Ira Gershwin, George Gershwin) – 3:50

All music composed by Sammy Nestico, other composers and writers indicated.

== Personnel ==
- Count Basie - piano
- Dale Carley - trumpet
- Sonny Cohn
- Jim Crawford
- Bob Summers
- Frank Szabo
- Bill Hughes - trombone
- Grover Mitchell
- Dennis Willson
- Mitchell "booty" Wood
- Danny Turner - alto saxophone
- Chris Woods
- Eric Dixon - tenor saxophone
- Kenny Hing
- Johnny Williams - baritone saxophone
- Freddie Green - guitar
- Cleveland Eaton - double bass
- Dennis Mackrel - drums
- Sammy Nestico - arranger, conductor
