= Joe Riposo =

American jazz musician

Joseph Riposo is a saxophonist, composer, arranger, and was an educator at Syracuse University. He was the Director of Jazz Studies at Syracuse University and directed the Morton B. Schiff Jazz Ensemble. He has played with Tony Bennett, Sammy Davis Jr., Nat King Cole, Ella Fitzgerald, the Mcguire Sisters, the Woody Herman Band, Jackie Leonard, Diane Schuur, Harry Connick Jr., and Natalie Cole. Riposo has been a conductor for jazz ensembles with Dizzy Gillespie, Phil Woods, Marvin Stamm, Darius Brubeck, and Nick Brignola.

== Biography ==
He grew up in Syracuse as a clarinetist but quickly moved to saxophone and other various woodwind instruments. Riposo went on to study music at Syracuse University and graduated in 1957. After graduation, he became a member of the U.S. Army Band at Fort Dix, a US Army base located just south of Trenton, New Jersey. While there, he toured with the band throughout the First Army Area. He also became the Chief Instructor in the School of Music. During this time, Riposo was also touring internationally with the Woodland Quartet. In 1960, he returned to Syracuse to pursue a career in music education.

Riposo is the fourth son of an Italian concert master and pianist. He and his siblings grew up in a house with classical and popular music. His father, Giuseppe, an Italian immigrants, made an income as a mason and imparted his love of music to his five children.

Riposo served as the director of music education for the Liverpool Central School District for 31 years. For 28 years he was Director of Jazz Studies at Syracuse University. He was president of the International Association of Jazz Educators (New York State unit) and the North Eastern Division Coordinator for the International Association of Jazz Educators. He was jazz coordinator and clinician for the New York State School Music Association and holds certification as a woodwind and state jazz adjudicator for the NYSSMA association. Riposo retired from the Liverpool Central School District in 1991.

He published over 50 books on jazz technique and jazz language. His book Jazz Improvisation: A Whole Brain Approach uses research in "hemisphericity" or lateralization of brain function to teach jazz improvisation. He is a contract writer for four publishers: Walrus Music, E -Jazzline, Increase Music, and Jamey Aebersold Jazz. His books include Bebop Scales, Jazz Scales and Patterns in All Keys, Target Tones and Approach Tones, Shaping Bebop Lines, Developing a Jazz Vocabulary, The Language of Jazz, and Making a Connection with Your Saxophone, Teaching with a Focus on Learning to Play Jazz.

Riposo plays in the Salt City Jazz Collective in Armory Square. One of his projects includes a jazz composition commissioned by the Mellon CNY Humanities Corridor and the College of Arts and Sciences of Syracuse University.

== Awards and honors ==
- 1992 Honored by the State of New York Legislative Resolutions for his contributions to Music Education
- 1997 Syracuse Area Music Awards Hall of Fame inductee
- 2003 Fine Arts Hall of Fame inductee
- 2008 Jazz Educator of the Year, Central New York Jazz Arts Foundation
- 2009 Jazz Legend of Upstate New York
- 2011 SAMMYS Music Educator Hall of Fame inductee
- 2012 Honored by the State of New York Legislative Resolution for his lifetime achievements as a musician and teacher by Senator John DeFrancisco
- American Society of Composers, Authors, and Publishers Award (fifteen years in a row)
- Outstanding Jazz Educators Award, National Band Association
- Medallion for contributions to NYSSMA
