= Eric Miller (music producer) =

American jazz producer and A&R executive

Eric Stephen Miller
- Born: September 28, 1941; Cleveland, Ohio, United States
- Died: February 25, 2017 (aged 75); Los Angeles, California, United States
- Genres: Jazz
- Occupation: Record producer
- Years active: mid 1960s–early 2000s
- Labels: Verve, Pablo, Fantasy

Eric Miller (September 28, 1941 – February 25, 2017) was an American jazz record producer.

== Professional career ==
Born in Cleveland, Ohio, Miller was raised in Los Angeles. He began his career as a tape archivist for MGM's recording studios in Hollywood. A protégé of Norman Granz, Miller assisted him in launching Pablo Records in 1972. He continued to work with Pablo as a producer and artists-and-repertoire man, after Fantasy acquired the label from Granz in 1987.

Miller, a jazz fanatic, began his career in the music business in the mid 1960s working as a tape archivist at MGM’s recording studios in Hollywood. In the late 60’s, he was hired as an assistant by celebrated jazz producer and empresario Norman Granz, founder of Verve Records and promoter of the Jazz at the Philharmonic tours.

Miller soon became a close friend and protégé of Granz, working with him on various concert tours and recording projects and helping him launch Pablo Records in 1972. Miller was Pablo’s head of artists & repertoire, and oversaw numerous album projects for Pablo, producing new recordings, and previously unreleased sessions for a who’s who of artists including Ella Fitzgerald, Duke Ellington, Oscar Peterson, Art Tatum, Jimmy Smith, John Coltrane, Count Basie, Joe Pass, Billie Holiday, Thelonious Monk, Dizzy Gillespie, Ray Charles, and many more.

When Granz sold Pablo to Fantasy Records in 1987, Miller continued to work with the label as a producer and head of artist & repertoire until the early 2000s.

Miller’s extensive archive of unreleased jazz master tapes has been used for numerous reissue projects, most recently Verve’s 2-CD sets The Complete Charlie Parker With Strings (2015) and Unheard Bird: The Unissued Takes (2016).

== Death ==
He died from a heart attack at home in Los Angeles on February 25, 2017.
