= Sammy Nestico =

American music arranger (1924–2021)

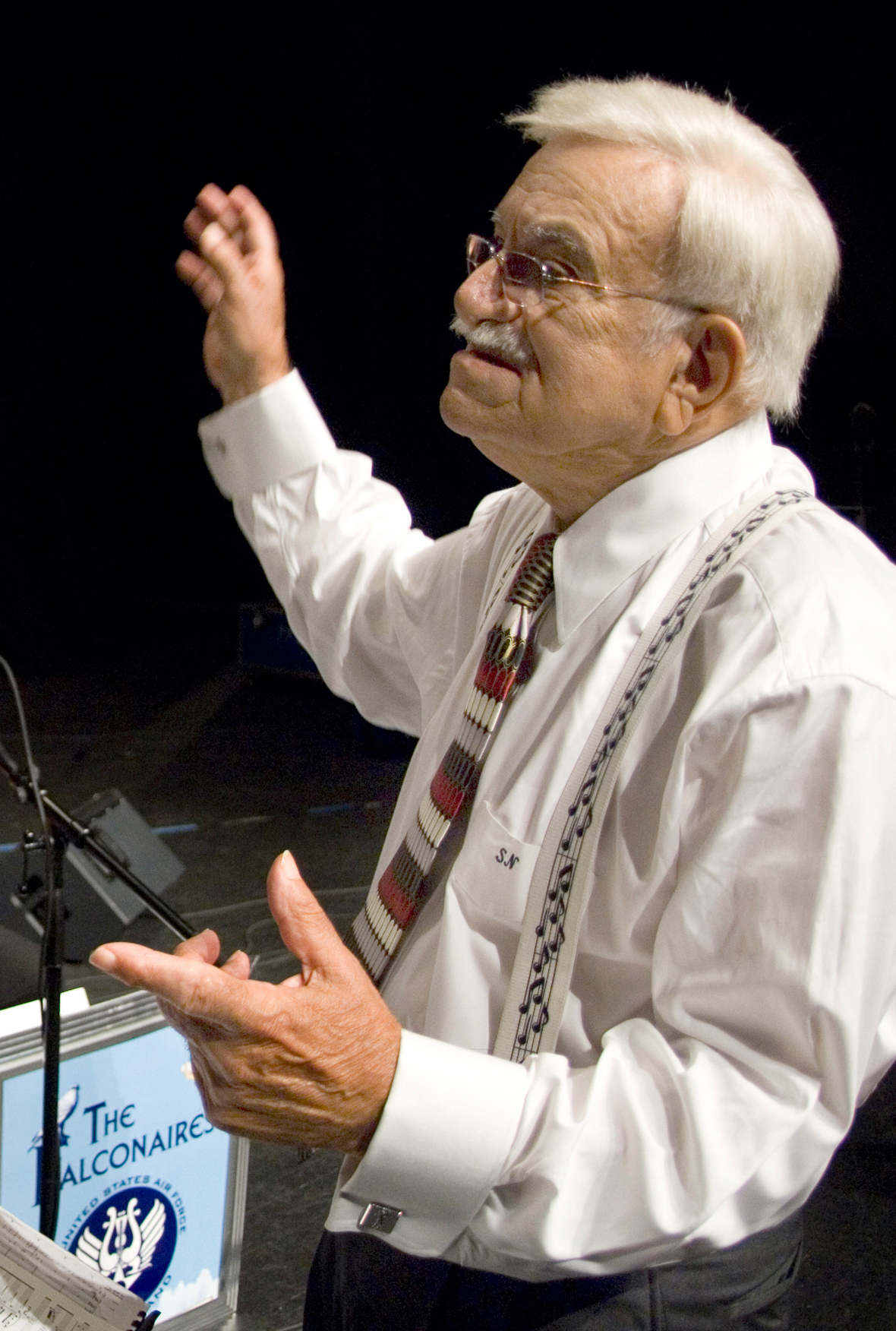
- Nestico in 2006

Background information
- Born: Samuel Louis Nistico; February 6, 1924; Pittsburgh, Pennsylvania, U.S.
- Died: January 17, 2021 (aged 96) Carlsbad, California, U.S.
- Genre: Jazz
- Occupations: Composer, arranger

Samuel Louis Nestico (born Samuel Luigi Nistico; February 6, 1924 – January 17, 2021) was an American jazz composer and arranger. Nestico is best known for his arrangements for the Count Basie orchestra.

== Early life and education ==
Samuel Luigi Nistico was born on February 6, 1924, in Pittsburgh, Pennsylvania to Luigi Nistico, an Italian immigrant, and Frances Mangone. His father was a railroad worker. During childhood, Sammy Americanized his name to Samuel Louis Nestico. Nestico joined the Oliver High School beginner orchestra in 1937 as a trombonist. In 1939, he wrote his first arrangement. At age 17, Nestico joined the ABC radio station WCAE in Pittsburgh, Pennsylvania as a trombonist. After leaving the military, he completed a degree in music education at Duquesne University. His alma mater later awarded him with an honorary Doctor of Music degree and the Distinguished Alumni award.

== Career ==
During World War II, Nestico joined the United States Army and served for five years. After earning his degree, Nestico then returned to the military, where he arranged music for the United States Air Force Band (1950–1963), as well as leading the Glenn Miller Army Air Corps dance band, which would later become known as the Airmen of Note. In 1963, he joined the Marines and became chief arranger of the United States Marine Band, where he served under presidents John F. Kennedy and Lyndon B. Johnson. During his tenure, a composition by Nestico led President Johnson to remark "You call this music?" In 2009, Nestico said in an interview "I didn't answer, although I didn't think [Johnson's] concept of music was worth a damn."

After leaving the military, Nestico became a freelance arranger. He began working as an arranger for Count Basie in 1967, and wrote and arranged all the music for Basie's 1968 LP Basie Straight Ahead. Nestico continued to provide arrangements for Basie until Basie's death in 1984, and four of Nestico's collaborations with Basie earned Grammy Awards. During his career, Nestico composed, arranged, or conducted albums for musicians and singers including Quincy Jones, Phil Collins, Barbra Streisand, Michael Buble, Natalie Cole, Sarah Vaughan, Toni Tennille, Frank Sinatra, and Bing Crosby. In addition, he played trombone, in the big bands of Tommy Dorsey, Woody Herman, Gene Krupa, and Charlie Barnet. He conducted and recorded his arrangements with several leading European Radio Jazz Orchestras, including the BBC Big Band in London, Germany's SWR Big Band and NDR Big Band and the DR Big Band, as well as the Boston Pops Orchestra in America.

Nestico had a long career in the film and television industry. As orchestrator, he worked on nearly seventy television programs, including Mission: Impossible, Mannix, M*A*S*H, Charlie's Angels, and The Mod Squad. He also worked as an arranger for the 81st Academy Awards, as well as some Grammy Awards. He worked as an orchestrator and arranger for the film The Color Purple. Nestico composed commercial jingles for Anheuser-Busch, Zenith, Ford Motor Company, Mattel Toys, Pittsburgh Paint, the National Guard, Dodge, Remington Bank, and Americard.

In the late 1960s, Sammy worked as an arranger and orchestrator for Capitol Records. In a partnership with Billy May, Nestico was involved in the transcription, arranging, and re-recording of 630 big band songs originally recorded in the 1930s and 1940s. This effort eventually resulted in the release of 63 albums by Time Life.

Beginning in 1982, Nestico began releasing solo albums, with Dark Orchid as his debut album. His solo albums eventually earned him four Grammy Award nominations, besides the awards he earned with Count Basie: in 2002 for his album This Is The Moment and for the arrangement "Kiji Takes A Ride"; in 2009 for his album Fun Time; and in 2016 for his arrangement "Good 'Swing' Wenceslas".

Nestico also had a career in music education, teaching at the University of Georgia from 1998 to 1999, where he taught orchestration and conducted the studio orchestra; after which he retired to Carlsbad, California, near San Diego. He directed music programs at Los Angeles Pierce College, Woodland Hills, California, Westinghouse Memorial High School, and Wilmerding, Pennsylvania.

Nestico wrote hundreds of arrangements for school band and jazz band programs. He wrote many books, including The Complete Arranger, which was first published in 1993 and has since been revised and published in at least four languages. His autobiography, The Gift of Music, was published in 2009. At the time of his death, a feature-length documentary film titled Shadow Man: The Sammy Nestico Story was in production.

== Publications ==
Nestico published nearly 600 numbers for school groups and many for professional big bands.

== Personal life ==
Nestico married his second wife, Shirley, in 1995, and was married to her until his death. He had three sons with his first wife. In 2021, Nestico died in Carlsbad, California, at the age of 96. He was given a military burial later in 2021.

== Honors ==
Nestico received honorary Doctor of Music degrees from Duquesne University and in 2005 from Shenandoah University. He also received a distinguished alumni award from Duquesne, and in 1994 was inducted into Duquesne's "Century Club". He received awards from North Texas State University in 1978, 1979, and 1980. He was also honored by ASMAC and the Big Band Academy of America. The Airmen of Note, the premier jazz ensemble of the USAF, sponsor an annual competition, the "Sammy Nestico Award" for composers and arrangers of big band music, named in his honor.

== Discography ==
This list is incomplete. Sources:

- 1982 Dark Orchid (Palo Alto)
- 1986 Night Flight (Sea Breeze)
- 1998 Big Band Favorites of Sammy Nestico (Summit)
- 2000 Sammy Nestico – For You to Play (Jamey Aebersold)
- 2000 Basie & Beyond The Quincy Jones-Sammy Nestico Orchestra (Qwest / Warner Bros.)
- 2002 This is the Moment (Fenwood)
- 2005 No Time Like the Present (Hänssler)
- 2005 Basie Cally Sammy: The Music of Count Basie and Sammy Nestico (Hänssler)
- 2009 Sammy Nestico, Vol. 3: Fun Time (Hänssler)
- 2011 Fun Time & More Live (Hänssler)
- 2012 On the Sammy Side of the Street (SN Music)
- 2017 A Cool Breeze with Sammy Nestico with the SWR Big Band (SWR Music)

=== As arranger ===
With Count Basie

- Basie Straight Ahead (Dot, 1968)
- Standing Ovation (Dot, 1969)
- Have a Nice Day (Daybreak, 1971)
- Bing 'n' Basie (Daybreak, 1972)
- Basie Big Band (Pablo, 1975)
- Prime Time (Pablo, 1977)
- Warm Breeze (Pablo, 1981)
- 88 Basie Street (Pablo, 1983)
- Fancy Pants (Pablo, 1983)

With Frank Sinatra

- "It's All Right With Me"/"Until the Real Thing Comes Along"/"Stormy Weather"/"If I Should Lose You"/"A Hundred Years from Today" on L.A. Is My Lady (Qwest, 1984)

With Sarah Vaughan

- Send in the Clowns (Pablo, 1981)
