= Dennis Mackrel =

American drummer

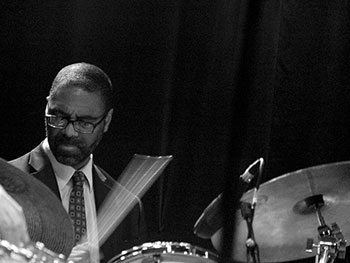
- Mackrel performing in Aarhus Denmark 2014

Background information
- Born: April 3, 1962 (age 64); Omaha, Nebraska
- Genres: Jazz
- Occupation: Musician
- Instrument: Drums
- Website: dennismackrelmusic.com

Dennis Mackrel (born April 3, 1962) is an American jazz drummer, composer, and arranger who was a member of the Count Basie Orchestra and the Vanguard Jazz Orchestra.

== Career ==
The son of two jazz enthusiasts, Mackrel started playing drums at age two and began his professional career playing at a community theater at age ten. He attended the University of Nevada, Las Vegas, studying jazz under Frank Gagliardi, during which time he performed in venues such as the Imperial Palace and the Tropicana. In 1981, Mackrel moved to New York City and became a drummer with a Broadway theatre orchestra. Two years later on the personal recommendation of singer Joe Williams, Mackrel joined the Count Basie Orchestra where he would remain until December 1987. He was the last drummer of that orchestra to be personally hired by Count Basie himself.

After leaving the Basie Orchestra, Mackrel frequently performed as a substitute drummer in the Mel Lewis Jazz Orchestra. Shortly before Lewis died in February 1990, he announced that he wanted Mackrel to take his place as the regular drummer for the band, which soon changed its name to the Vanguard Jazz Orchestra.

Mackrel later became the drummer for many other big bands and small groups including the Hank Jones Trio, the American Jazz Orchestra, the Carla Bley Big Band, Buck Clayton's Swing Band, the George Shearing Quintet and the Dizzy Gillespie All Star Big Band. In September 2010, he returned to the Count Basie Orchestra after the retirement of trombonist Bill Hughes. and served as the orchestra's leader and chief conductor until 2013 and on November 7, 2015, he was named chief conductor of the Jazz Orchestra of the Concertgebouw which is based in Amsterdam, Holland.

As a composer and arranger, Mackrel has received a Grant for Composition from the National Endowment for the Arts (1983). He has written pieces for McCoy Tyner (on the Grammy-winning The Turning Point and Journey), the WDR Radio Big Band of Cologne, the Klüvers Big Band of Denmark, the RIAS Big Band of Berlin. the United States Military Academy at West Point's Jazz Knights Big Band, the Columbus Jazz Orchestra and the Temple University Jazz Ensemble.

As an experienced jazz educator who conducts master classes, seminars and workshops throughout Europe, Asia, Canada and the United States, Mackrel has performed with the jazz ensembles of numerous colleges and high schools including the Eastman School of Music, Slippery Rock University, the University of Wisconsin, Oshkosh, Northern Illinois University, Cincinnati Conservatory of Music, the University of Minnesota, Morris, New Trier High School, Sun Prairie High School, Western Illinois University, Southern Utah University, the Royal Conservatory of Music in Aarhus, Denmark, the University of Florida, Miami, the University of Nevada, Las Vegas, Elmhurst College, Michigan State University and many others. He is currently a professor at Queens College in Flushing, New York.

== Discography ==
=== As conductor ===
- McCoy Tyner Big Band, Journey (Verve, 1993)
- Dennis Mackrel, Quiet Pride (Motéma, 2013)
- DR Big Band, Jazzin' Around Christmas (Storyville, 2016)
- Jazz Orchestra of the Concertgebouw, Crossroads (JOC, 2018)
- Mike LeDonne's Groover Quartet & Big Band, It's All Your Fault (Savant, 2021)

=== As sideman ===
With Count Basie

- Me and You (Pablo, 1983)
- 88 Basie Street (Pablo, 1984) – recorded in 1983
- Fancy Pants (Pablo, 1986) – recorded in 1983
- Long Live the Chief (Denon, 1986)

With Keter Betts

- Live at the East Coast Jazz Festival (Keter Betts Music, 2000)
- Pinky's Waltz (Jazzmont, 2002)

With Carla Bley

- Big Band Theory (WATT, 1993)
- The Carla Bley Big Band Goes to Church (WATT, 1996)

With Chris Connor

- Haunted Heart (HighNote, 2001)
- I Walk with Music (HighNote, 2002)

With Michael Davis

- Absolute Trombone (Hip-Bone Music, 1997)
- Absolute Trombone II (Hip-Bone Music, 2007)

With Dizzy Gillespie Alumni All-Star Big Band

- Things to Come (MCG, 2002)
- Dizzy's Business (MCG, 2006)

With Hank Jones

- With the Meridian String Quartet (LRC, 1991)
- Favors (Verve, 1997)
- For My Father (Justin Time, 2005)

With Kluvers Big Band

- Better Believe It (Music Mecca, 2001)
- Hot House Thilo Meets Mackrel (Stunt, 2008)

With Grover Mitchell

- Hip Shakin (Ken Music, 1990)
- On Track (Quixotic, 1997)

With John Pizzarelli

- Our Love Is Here to Stay (RCA/BMG, 1997)
- The Rare Delight of You (Telarc, 2002)

With Randy Sandke

- Calling All Cats (Concord Jazz, 1996)
- Inside Out (Nagel Heyer, 2002)
- Outside in (Evening Star, 2005)
- Trumpet After Dark (Evening Star, 2005)

With Don Sebesky

- I Remember Bill (RCA Victor, 1998)
- Joyful Noise (RCA Victor, 1999)

With George Shearing

- That Shearing Sound (Telarc, 1994)
- Christmas with the George Shearing Quintet (Telarc, 1998)
- Back to Birdland (Telarc, 2001)

With others

- Howard Alden, Snowy Morning Blues (Concord Jazz, 1990)
- American Jazz Orchestra, The Music of Jimmie Lunceford (MusicMasters, 1991)
- Canadian Brass, Noel (RCA Victor, 1994)
- Bill Charlap, Souvenir (Criss Cross, 1995)
- Buck Clayton, Swings the Village (Nagel Heyer, 2002)
- Todd Coolman, Collectables (Sunnyside, 2016)
- Joey DeFrancesco, Where Were You? (Columbia, 1990)
- Brett Eldredge, Glow (Atlantic, 2018)
- Clare Fischer, Tjaderama (Trend, 1988)
- David Horler, Rolling Down 7th (Mons, 2006)
- Jane Horrocks, The Further Adventures of Little Voice (Liberty, 2000)
- Jay Leonhart, Two Lane Highways (Kado, 1992)
- Denise Jannah, I Was Born in Love with You (Blue Note, 1995)
- Thad Jones, Way-Out Basie (Philips, 1987)
- Chaka Khan, Classikhan (AGU/Earthsong/Sanctuary Urban, 2004)
- Viktor Lazlo, Viktor Lazlo (Polydor, 1987)
- Mel Lewis, To You: A Tribute to Mel Lewis (Musicmasters, 1991)
- Kirk MacDonald, Symmetry (Addo, 2013)
- Kevin Mahogany, Pussy Cat Dues the Music of Charles Mingus (Enja, 2000)
- Michael Moriarty, Live at Fat Tuesday's (DRG, 1992)
- Bucky Pizzarelli, Plays the Music of Jerome Kern (LRC, 2006)
- Scott Robinson, Bronze Nemesis (Doc-Tone, 2012)
- Maria Schneider, Evanescence (Enja, 1994)
- Diane Schuur, Diane Schuur and the Count Basie Orchestra (GRP, 1987)
- Carol Sloane, The Songs Ella & Louis Sang (Concord Jazz, 1997)
- Carol Sloane, Carol Sloane (Concord Jazz, 2001)
- Marvin Stamm & Mike Holober, Live at Maureen's Jazz Cellar (Big Miles Music, 2020)
- Byron Stripling, Byron, Get One Free... (Nagel Heyer, 2001)
- Byron Stripling, Stripling Now! (Nagel Heyer, 1999)
- Grady Tate, Grady Tate Sings TNT (Milestone, 1991)
- Grady Tate, From the Heart (Half Note, 2006)
- Caterina Valente, Caterina Valente '86 & the Count Basie Orchestra (Global, 1986)
- Jack Walrath, Get Hit in Your Soul (ACT, 2000) – recorded in 1996
- Frank Wess, Entre Nous (Concord Jazz, 1991)
- Joe Williams, That Holiday Feelin (Verve, 1991) – recorded in 1990
