= Mel Wanzo =

American jazz musician

Melvin "Mel" Wanzo, also known as Melvin Wahid Muhammad (November 22, 1930, Cleveland - September 9, 2005, Detroit) was an American jazz trombonist. He is best known for his longtime association with the Count Basie Orchestra.

Wanzo received formal education in music at Youngstown University in Youngstown, Ohio, graduating in 1952. He then joined the United States Army and played in a band whose leader was Cannonball Adderley. In the 1950s he worked in bands behind blues and R&B singers such as Ruth Brown and Big Joe Turner, then studied music once more, at the Cleveland Institute of Music. In the 1960s he worked with Woody Herman and Ray McKinley (then leading the Glenn Miller Orchestra), and in 1969 became a member of the Count Basie Orchestra, where he played trombone until 1980. In the early 1980s he played with Frank Capp and Nat Pierce, then re-joined Basie's orchestra after Basie died and leadership passed to Thad Jones and Frank Foster.
