= Pete Minger =

American jazz musician

Pete Minger (January 22, 1943 in Orangeburg, South Carolina – April 13, 2000 in Pompano Beach, Florida), born George Allen Minger, was an American bebop-based trumpeter. He also played flugelhorn.

He came from a musical family with his mother and grandmother playing piano at church. His brother is also a jazz pianist. He started with saxophone, but switched to trumpet at an early point. From 1970 to 1980 he worked with Count Basie's orchestra. He can be heard on the album Digital III at Montreux in that period.

After his work with Basie he moved to Florida and released Straight From The Source (Spinnster Records, 1984) with Keter Betts on base, Bobby Durham on drums and Dolph Castellano on Piano. He received a degree in music from the University of Miami in 1985. He later taught there, but continued to perform. In 1990 he toured with Frank Wess's big-band and also worked with Mel Tormé. He became a noted individual in Florida's jazz scene releasing two albums of his own, Minger Paintings (Jazz Alliance, 1991), and Look To The Sky (Concord Jazz, 1992).
