= Heard Ranier Ferguson =

Jazz trio of John Heard, Tom Ranier, and Sherman Ferguson

- Genre: Jazz
- Years active: 1980s
- Label: ITI
- Past members: John Heard; Tom Ranier; Sherman Ferguson

Heard Ranier Ferguson was a jazz trio consisting of bass player John Heard, pianist Tom Ranier, and drummer Sherman Ferguson. They were active in the 1980s and played frequently at Howard Rumsey's concerts at the Redondo Beach pier.

The trio released its self titled album on ITI Records in 1983.

== Background up to 1983 ==
The trio was founded by the three members, Heard, Ranier and Ferguson. In 1982, they were referred to by the Jazz Times as "the most captivating new jazz combo in town".

=== John Heard ===
In addition to playing bass, John Heard was a talented artist. In the late 1950s while still in the air force, he held art classes and taught art to the wives of the officers in the force where he picked up some extra money. After leaving the air force in 1961, he enrolled at The Art Institute of Pittsburgh. He had played and worked with Al Jarreau, Sonny Rollins and Wes Montgomery in the 1960s. In 1969 he moved to Los Angeles.

In the 1970s he performed with Toshiko Akiyoshi, Count Basie, Louie Bellson, John Collins, Joe Henderson, Ahmad Jamal, Blue Mitchell and Oscar Peterson. In 1979 he recorded with the Oscar Peterson Septet, playing on the Original Score From The Silent Partner, in 1979 with the Clark Terry Sextet on Yes, The Blues and the Zoot Sims Quintet on Passion. In 1982 he recorded with Eddie "Lockjaw" Davis, Harry Edison and the Al Grey Sextet.

=== Tom Rainer ===
Prior to joining the trio, Tom Ranier had recorded some solo albums. His album Ranier was released in 1976. He also recorded another album Night Music that was released in 1980. He was also on an album by the Jimmy Mosher Quartet in 1982.

=== Sherman Ferguson ===
Originally from Philadelphia, Sherman Ferguson had started his career in the mid-1960s. His early influences were drummers Max Roach and Roy Haynes. He had worked with Charles Earland. In the early 1970s he worked with guitarist Pat Martino, playing on his Desperado, Prestige and Consciousness albums. In 1976, he moved to Los Angeles where he supported Kenny Burrell.

== Album ==
Their 1983 album, Heard Ranier Ferguson was released on ITI Records, a California based label founded by Michael Dion. Their album was one of the labels first releases. It was released on compact disc in 1987. On the album, they covered Duke Ellington's "Isfahan" and a memorable version of "Limehouse Blues". It was announced on the Jazz Monthly website in 2012 that their album along with others by Ruth Price, Tom Garvin, Bill Mays and Red Mitchell were to be re-released that year as the ITI Records back catalogue was being released through Warrant Music.

== Later years ==
John Heard, by 1980 having recorded with artists such as Tete Montoliu, Eddie "Lockjaw" Davis, Art Pepper, Clark Terry, Pharoah Sanders, Zoot Sims and Joe Williams, He announced his retirement from music in favor of pursuing his art career. In the 1990s, he had returned to the scene and played with, Benny Carter, Jamal and others. In 2005, his album The Jazz Composer's Songbook was released on Straight Ahead Records and produced by Stewart Levine and mastered by Bernie Grundman.

In 1986 Tom Rainer had done studio work for shows like The Young and the Restless" and Noises Off in 1992. Around 1994, he was playing live with jazz veteran Terry Gibbs at Ojai's Wheeler Hot Springs. In the late 2000s he was doing live shows with his group, The Tom Ranier Trio (Tom Rainer and the rhythm section from Dancing with the Stars).

Sherman Ferguson died on January 22nd 2006 from complications relating to his diabetes condition. At the time of his death, Ferguson had appeared on over 80 recorded albums.

== Discography ==
List
Title	Release info	Year	F	Notes
Heard Ranier Ferguson	ITI JL 003	1989	Record LP	
Heard Ranier Ferguson	ITI JC 003	1983	Cassette	
Back To Back	Allegiance CDP 72973	1987	Compact disc	
Back To Back	ITI Records Cat # 201201	2012	Compact disc	Re-release (August 21)
Back To Back	ITI Records Cat 201201	2015	Compact disc	Re-release (May 5)
