= John Heard (musician) =

American musical artist (1938–2021)

- Born: John William Heard; July 3, 1938; Pittsburgh, Pennsylvania, United States
- Died: December 10, 2021 (aged 83)
- Genres: Jazz
- Occupations: Jazz musician artist
- Instruments: Double bass Electric bass
- Years active: 1960s–2021
- Label: ITI Records

John William Heard (July 3, 1938 – December 10, 2021) was an American bass player and artist. His recording credits include albums with Pharoah Sanders, George Duke, Oscar Peterson, Count Basie, Zoot Sims, Ahmad Jamal, Frank Morgan, George Cables. His professional jazz performance career lasted from the 1960s to the early 2010s, during which he also worked as a visual artist, producing drawings, paintings, and sculptures.

== Background ==
He was born in Pittsburgh, Pennsylvania, United States.

He also played saxophone in his early years. He began playing bass at the age of 14. His professional career began in a band that included sax player Booker Ervin, drummer J.C. Moses, pianist Horace Parlan and trumpet player Tommy Turrentine. While in high school, he attended special classes at the Carnegie Museum of Art.

In 1958, he joined the United States Air Force and was sent to Germany. Because of his art experience he was given a job of designing posters for events. He also did some art teaching, teaching the wives of officers. He left the Air Force in 1961 and enrolled at the Art Institute of Pittsburgh. He returned to music and went to Buffalo and later to California.

On December 10, 2021, Heard died at the age of 83.

== Art ==
In the 1980s, he had converted a North Hollywood garage into a studio and was spending much time there painting. He said that he was hanging out with Santa Monica-based sculptor Jim Casey, who was teaching him the way he wanted to learn. 18 months prior to his being interviewed for the article he had taken up sculpting. His first one was a bust of Duke Ellington, then one of Billy Eckstine. At the time he was working on one of Louis Armstrong.

Examples of his work are held in the Oakland Museum of California. They include drawings of Bud Powell and Milt Jackson.

== Musical career ==
=== 1960s ===
Playing double-bass, he has worked with Tommy Turrentine and Al Jarreau from the mid to late 1960s. Also in the late 1960s he worked with Jean-Luc Ponty, Sonny Rollins and Wes Montgomery.

=== 1970s ===
In the 1970s, he performed with Toshiko Akiyoshi, Count Basie, Louie Bellson, John Collins, Joe Henderson, Ahmad Jamal, Blue Mitchell and Oscar Peterson.

=== 1980s ===
In the 1980s, he performed with Eddie "Lockjaw" Davis, Buddy Montgomery and Pharoah Sanders.

In 1981, he played bass on the Blue Balkan album by pianist Larry Vuckovich. Other musicians to play on the album were vibraphonist Bobby Hutcherson and drummer Eddie More. Heard also played with Vuckovich's band on their first "Club Date" show on PBS, which was picked up by at least 120 cities in the U.S. In addition to Heard and Vuckovitch, the band included Tom Harrell on trumpet, and Sherman Ferguson on drums. As an unexpected bonus, the group was joined by saxophonist Charles McPherson for their last piece. The show's producer Paul Marshall spotted him in the audience, and asked him if he had his saxophone which he did and asked him to join them.

In 1983, he joined Tom Ranier and Sherman Ferguson to create the group Heard, Ranier, Ferguson, which released an eponymous album on the ITI Records label in 1983. The album art included a lithograph of Count Basie that was drawn by John Heard. An article in Billboard's October 1983 issue, indicated that he was going to be used as a graphic artist for the label. He was to be marketed as both an artist and a musician.

In an article in the Los Angeles Times dated 31 May 1987, he said that he had always wanted to paint, and planned to leave music. Before his retirement he had managed to record with musicians such as Spanish pianist Tete Montoliu, Eddie "Lockjaw" Davis, Art Pepper, Clark Terry, Pharoah Sanders, Zoot Sims and Joe Williams.

=== 1990s ===
After taking time out from music to do painting, he returned to the scene and played with Benny Carter, Jamal and others.

=== 2000s ===
In 2005, he had his album The Jazz Composer's Songbook released on Straight Ahead Records and produced by Stewart Levine and mastered by Bernie Grundman.

Around the mid-2000s onwards, his group The John Heard Trio played at Charlie O's club in Van Nuys. In 2005, the group consisted of John Heard on bass, Tom Garvin on piano and Roy McCurdy on drums. At the club they played with Justo Almario and Rickey Woodard. Around 2010, the group consisted of Heard on bass, Andy Langham on piano and Roy McCurdy on drums and later around 2011, Lorca Hart instead of McCurdy was on drums. They would play Fridays and Saturdays there. Some of the musicians they would appear with were trumpet player Scotty Barnhart, trumpet player Ron King, saxophonists Chuck Manning, Don Menza, Lanny Morgan and guitarist Thom Rotella.

== Discography ==
=== LPs ===
- Heard Ranier Ferguson – Heard Ranier Ferguson – ITI Records – JL 003 – 1983
- John Heard & Co. – The Jazz Composer's Songbook – Straight Ahead Records – SAR102 (180gram) 2005

=== CDs ===
- John Heard & Co. – The Jazz Composer's Song Book – Straight Ahead Records – SAR102 (Hybrid, Dual Disc, Side1: CD, Side2: DVD) 2005
- Evan Hartzell Trio - Songs About Love and Nature feat. John Heard and Laura Alvarez -LJD002(lejazzdiscos) 2009

== Appearances (selective) ==
- The George Duke Trio – Jean-Luc Ponty Experience with the George Duke Trio – 1969
- George Duke - The Inner Source - 1971
- Moacir Santos – Maestro – 1972
- Cal Tjader – Live at the Funky Quarters - 1972
- Cal Tjader – Puttin' It Together - 1973
- Cal Tjader and Charlie Byrd – Tambu - 1973
- Cal Tjader – Last Bolero in Berkeley - 1973
- George Duke - Faces in Reflection - 1974
- George Duke - Feel - 1974
- Moacir Santos – Saudade - 1974
- Count Basie and Zoot Sims – Basie & Zoot – 1975
- Joe Henderson – Canyon Lady – 1975
- Ahmad Jamal – Recorded Live at Oil Can Harry's – 1976
- Count Basie – Basie Jam 2 – 1976
- Jean-Luc Ponty – Cantaloupe Island – 1976
- Count Basie – Basie Jam 3 – 1976
- Lew Tabackin and Warne Marsh - Tenor Gladness - 1976
- Harry Edison – Edison's Lights (Pablo, 1976)
- Blue Mitchell – Stablemates – 1977
- Count Basie – Kansas City 5 – 1977
- Oscar Peterson and Count Basie – Satch and Josh...Again – 1977
- Kenny Burrell – Stormy Monday – 1978
- Oscar Peterson – The London Concert – 1978
- Oscar Peterson and Count Basie – Yessir, That's My Baby – 1978
- Ira Sullivan - Peace (Galaxy, 1978)
- Ira Sullivan - Multimedia (Galaxy, 1978 [1982])
- Toshiko Akiyoshi – Toshiko Plays Billy Strayhorn – 1978
- Ella Fitzgerald – Dream Dancing – 1978
- Oscar Peterson and Count Basie – Count Basie Meets Oscar Peterson – The Timekeepers – 1978
- John Haley Sims and Harry Sweets Edison – Just Friends – 1978
- B.B. King – Let the Good Times Roll – 1979
- Ahmad Jamal – Intervals – 1980
- George Cables – Morning Song (HighNote, 1980 [released 2008])
- Kenny Burrell – Moon and Sand – 1980
- Tete Montoliu - Catalonian Nights Vol. 1, Catalonian Nights Vol. 2, Catalonian Nights Vol. 3 - 1980
- Oscar Peterson and Count Basie – Night Rider – 1980
- Count Basie – Kansas City 7 – 1980
- Gene Harris – Live at Otter Crest – 1981
- Eddie "Cleanhead" Vinson – I Want a Little Girl (Pablo, 1981)
- Gene Harris – Hot Lips – 1982
- Count Basie – Mostly Blues...and Some Others – 1983
- Pharoah Sanders – Heart is a Melody – 1983
- Tete Montoliu - Carmina - 1984
- George Cables – Phantom of the City – 1985
- Bobby Hutcherson - Color Schemes - 1985
- Buddy Montgomery – Ties of Love – 1986
- George Cables – By George – 1987
- Bud Shank – That Old Feeling (Contemporary, 1986)
- Bud Shank – Serious Swingers (Contemporary, 1987) with Bill Perkins
- Frank Morgan Bud Shank Quintet – Quiet Fire (Contemporary, 1987 [1991])
- Toshiko Akiyoshi – Lew Tabackin Big Band – Sumi-e – 1993
- Hugh Masekela – Almost Like Being in Jazz – 2005
