= Basie & Zoot =

Studio album by Count Basie
- Released: 1976
- Recorded: April 9, 1975
- Studio: RCA Studio, New York
- Genre: Jazz
- Length: 46:58
- Label: Pablo
- Producer: Norman Granz

Count Basie chronology
I Told You So (1976)	Basie & Zoot (1976)	Basie Jam 2 (1976)

Zoot Sims chronology
Motoring Along (1974)	Basie & Zoot (1976)	Zoot Sims and the Gershwin Brothers (1976)

Basie & Zoot is a studio album by the jazz pianist Count Basie and the saxophonist Zoot Sims, released in 1976 by Pablo Records. It was recorded on April 9, 1975, during a session organized by Norman Granz, the head of the label. Granz decided against using the Count Basie Orchestra, instead inviting Sims, who played with Basie a few years prior.

Basie & Zoot is a jazz album consisting of five standards and three original compositions. The songs vary in tempo, with some being uptempo and others being slow blues. The complexity of melodies played by Basie also varies between tracks. He performs the majority of the songs on a piano, only switching to an organ for the last track.

The album was reviewed generally positively, both at the time of its release and retrospectively, with some reviewers considering it one of the best jazz albums of the year. Critics highlighted the synergy between Basie and Sims, while also commending the bassist John Heard and the drummer Louie Bellson. The album appeared on several best albums lists and won the 1977 Grammy Award for Best Jazz Performance.

== Background ==
Following a financially troubled period in his career, the 1950–1960s European tours brought the pianist Count Basie back to his prior levels of popularity. According to Zan Stewart of Los Angeles Times, in that era Basie was "still a major force in jazz". In 1973, the concert promoter and producer Norman Granz founded the label Pablo Records. Shortly after, he signed Basie; the label released more than thirty albums by Basie over the next decade.

The saxophonist Zoot Sims rose to popularity in the 1940s by playing in popular big bands, led by artists Benny Goodman and Woody Herman; in Herman's band he was known as a member of the "Four Brothers" quartet. After struggling to find performing opportunities and briefly working as a house painter in the early 1950s, by the middle of the decade he returned to music, collaborating with many artists. John Swenson, the editor of The Rolling Stone Jazz & Blues Album Guide, wrote: "Sims evolved into one of the most dependable musicians of the '50s and '60s—any recording from this period is marked by his warm-toned yet tenacious blowing." In the early 1970s, Granz signed Sims to the Pablo label, where he released several albums throughout the decade.

== Recording and release ==
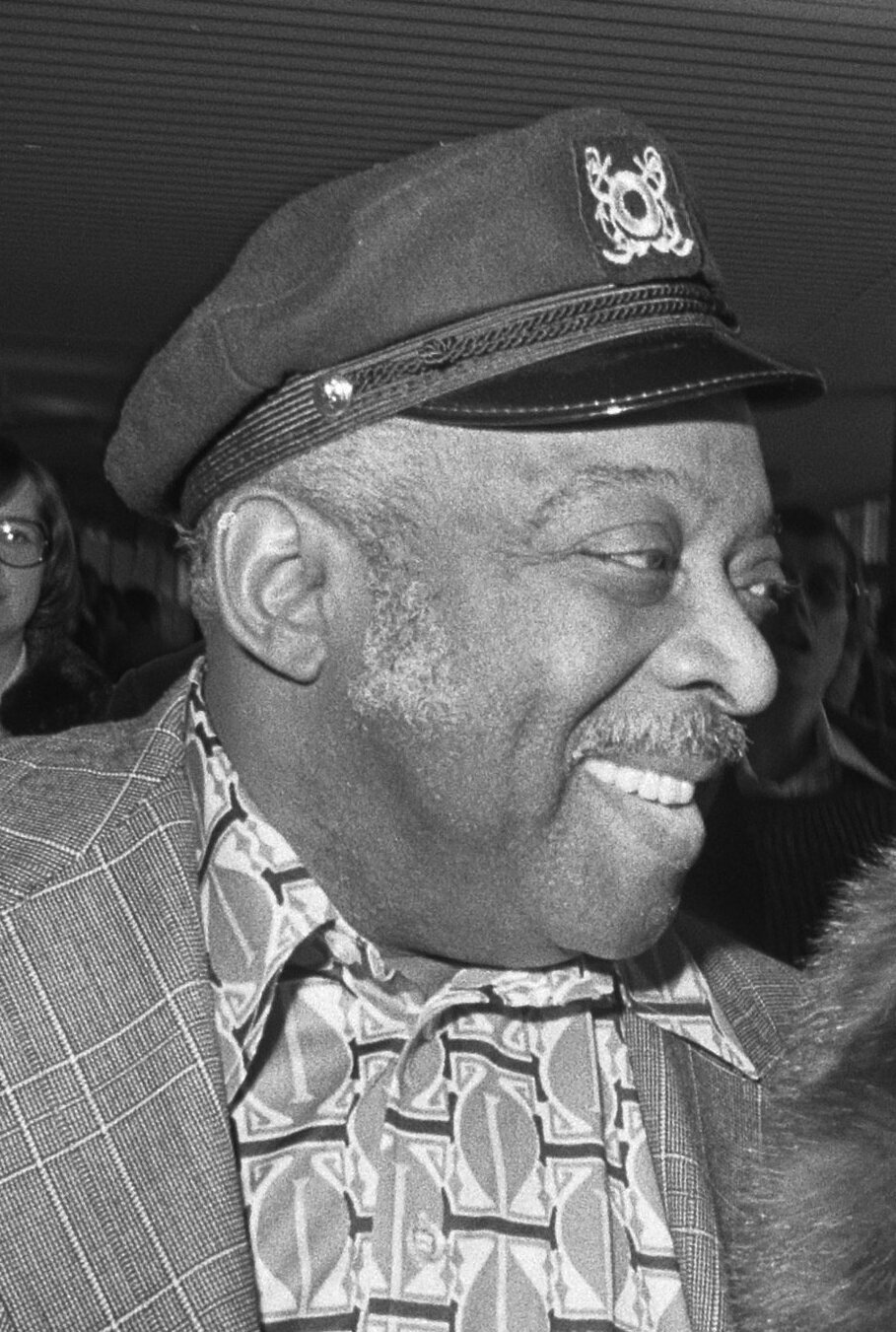
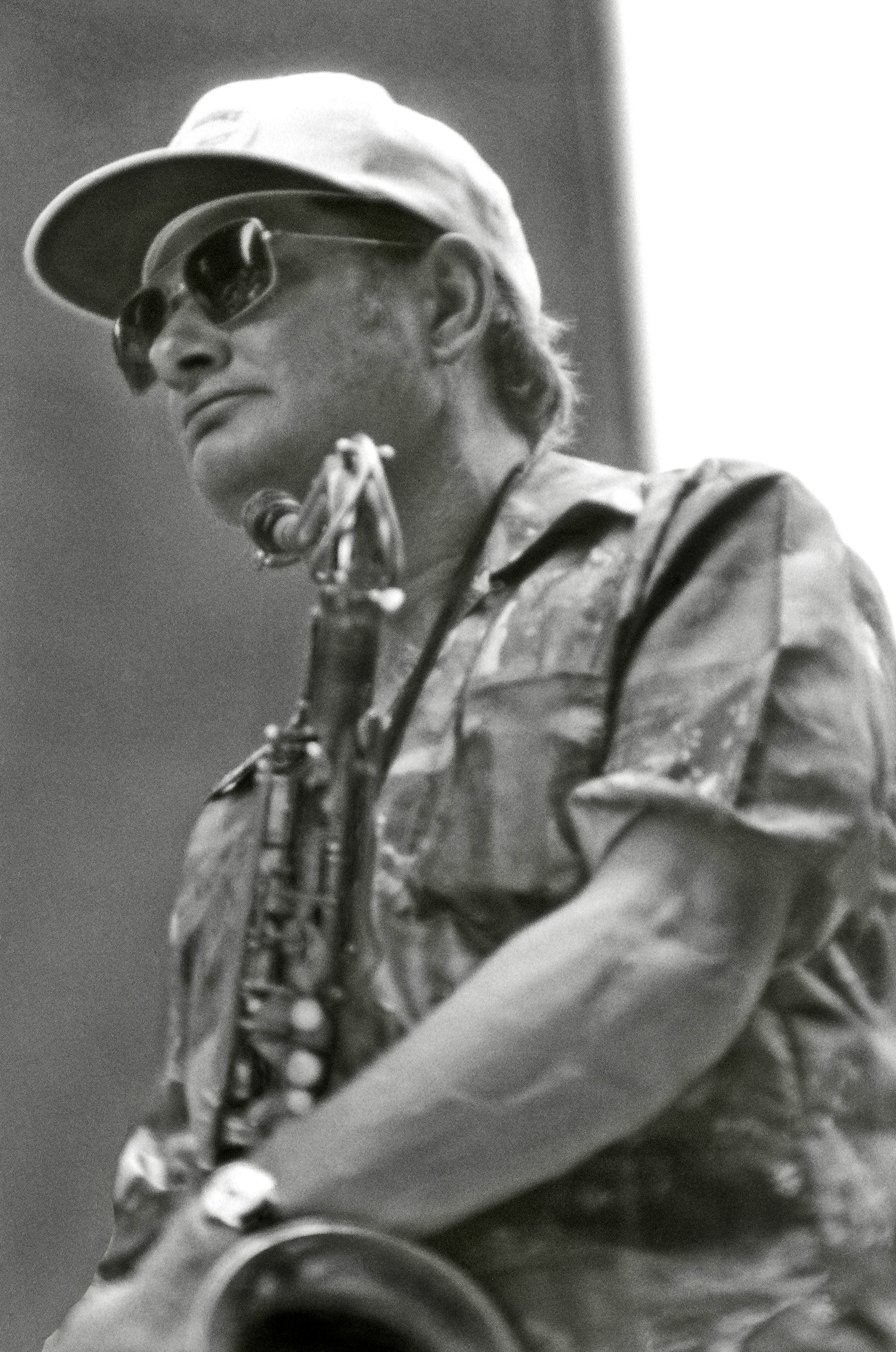
Count Basie (left) and Zoot Sims

In 1975, while the Count Basie Orchestra was touring, Norman Granz organized a recording session. It took place on April 9, at RCA Studio in New York City. Granz decided against recording the entire band, focusing instead on Basie and his piano performance. Zoot Sims, who previously played with Basie on Basie Jam (1973), was invited to accompany him. Basie & Zoot consists of songs recorded during this session, with the exception of "Zoot" and "Turnaround", which were performed without Zoot Sims and were later released on the compilation album Basie and Friends (1988). Several journalists compared the Basie & Zoot session to the 1936 session Basie had with the saxophonist Lester Young, who, according to Don Lass of Asbury Park Press, "paved the way for Sims and a whole generation of important players".

Basie & Zoot was released in 1976 by Pablo Records. Following the 1987 sale of Pablo Records to Fantasy Records, Basie & Zoot was later reissued as part of the label's Original Jazz Classics series.

== Composition ==
"I Never Knew"
The sample starts with a piano section, followed by a short pause that highlights the underlying bass, and ends with a saxophone section. These sections are supported by drums, played throughout the song.

Basie & Zoot is a jazz album. It contains eight tracks: five standards—Basie's renditions of popular jazz songs—and three original compositions. The album starts with an upbeat track "I Never Knew". John McDonough of DownBeat magazine described it as having "the hummingbird tempo", while Greg Murphy, music reviewer for Widnes Weekly News, believed the song sets tone for the rest of the album. It is followed by "It's Only a Paper Moon", which features a simplified melody that McDonough thought was "distilled to its utter essence". "Blues for Nat Cole", a dedication to the jazz singer Nat King Cole, is the first of the original compositions. It is a high-tempo song. The next track, "Captain Bligh", is also original. However, in contrast to the preceding song, "Captain Bligh" is a slow blues, in which "the notes seem to stick like honey to [Basie's] fingers", according to McDonough. The duo returns to the upbeat pace on "Honeysuckle Rose", originally a song by Fats Waller. Basie first performed it in 1937 with Lester Young. Discussing the version of the song on Basie & Zoot, authors of the book Jazz: From Its Origins to the Present Lewis Porter and Michael Ullman wrote: "On the 1975 version, Basie sounds exuberant, agile, free, swinging easily, as easily as if he were cutting butter". McDonough highlighted Heard's bass performance on the track, who "plays coyly with time signature" before switching to the standard 4/4 signature during the bridges. The following track, "Hardav", is the last original composition on the album. It is a slow blues, which Coda magazine's John Norris compared to the work of Jimmy Yancey due to it being "so articulate, emotional and simplistic". "Mean to Me", built around a simplified piano melody, features an improvisation by Sims. The album's closing track, "I Surrender, Dear", is the only song on the album where Basie plays an organ.

== Critical reception ==
Contemporaneous professional reviews
Review scores
Source	Rating
DownBeat	5/5 stars

Most contemporaneous critics lauded Basie & Zoot. In a review for Cadence, music critic Bob Rusch praised the album. Apart from the main artists, whose pairing he called "beautiful", Rusch also commended the producer Norman Granz for choosing the right musicians for the album, John Heard, whose bass he described as "sensitively walking [...] throughout the album", and the drummer Louie Bellson who is "only pushing and prodding Zoot and Basie with a delicate tension". Chris Albertson of Stereo Review described the album as "beautiful, tasteful, jazzful". DownBeat's John McDonough called Basie & Zoot a "very special album fashioned by a very special individual". The critic highlighted Basie's performance and his perception of melody, while also praising Zoot Sims for "reach[ing] levels of excellence unusual even for him". Alun Morgan of Jazz Journal thought the duo complemented each other, while the musicians accompanying them "are so good that one seldom notices their presence". The journalist assessed Basie & Zoot as one of the best albums of the year.

John Norris, writing for Coda, was more critical. While he still enjoyed Basie's performance and thought the album was a good addition to the pianist's discography, he argued that Sims's performance lacked individuality and that he is "his usual efficient self but his solos seem rather workmanlike". The critic felt dissatisfied with the technical quality of the record and was also disappointed in other musicians on the album, Heard and Bellson, who "play all the right notes without being noticeably dramatic", while he thought certain sections of the album would benefit from "more imaginative accompaniment".

=== Retrospective reviews ===
Retrospective professional reviews
Review scores
Source	Rating
AllMusic	4.5/5 stars
The Encyclopedia of Popular Music	4/5 stars
The Penguin Guide to Jazz Recordings	3.5/4 stars
The Rolling Stone Jazz & Blues Album Guide	3/5 stars

In the years since its release, the album continued receiving positive reviews from music critics. AllMusic's Scott Yanow concluded that the duo is "playing at the peak of their creative powers". Commending the pairing of Basie and Sims, Graham Lock, in his review for Gramophone, highlighted the simplicity of Basie's melodies; comparing it to the work of the pianist Thelonious Monk, he described it as "exercising a droll minimalism that takes economy of means to a new extreme". Richard Cook and Brian Morton, authors of The Penguin Guide to Jazz, believed Basie & Zoot to be one of the best albums Count Basie released on Pablo Records.

=== Accolades ===
Several publications placed Basie & Zoot on their best albums lists. The album ranked third in DownBeat magazine's yearly jazz critics poll. In 2018, The Daily Telegraph named it one of the 100 best jazz albums of all time, adding that "[t]his pairing [...] produces jazz at its most infectiously enjoyable".

Basie & Zoot won the 1977 Grammy Award for Best Jazz Performance.

== Track listing ==
No.	Title	Writer(s)	Length
1.	"I Never Knew"	Ted Fio Rito, Gus Kahn	4:38
2.	"It's Only a Paper Moon"	Harold Arlen, Yip Harburg, Billy Rose	5:33
3.	"Blues for Nat Cole"	Count Basie, Zoot Sims	6:32
4.	"Captain Bligh"	Basie, Sims	6:36
5.	"Honeysuckle Rose"	Andy Razaf, Fats Waller	6:23
6.	"Hardav"	Basie, Sims	4:41
7.	"Mean to Me"	Fred E. Ahlert, Roy Turk	6:30
8.	"I Surrender, Dear"	Harry Barris, Gordon Clifford	6:05
Total length:			46:58

== Personnel ==
Credits are adapted from the album's liner notes.

- Count Basie – piano, organ
- Zoot Sims – tenor saxophone
- John Heard – double bass
- Louie Bellson – drums
- Bob Simpson – engineer
- Norman Granz – design, photography
