= Heard Ranier Ferguson (album) =

Studio album by Heard Ranier Ferguson
- Released: 1983
- Recorded: 1983
- Genre: Jazz
- Label: ITI Records JL 003
- Producer: Executive producer: Michael Dion; Co-producer: Mike Grantham

Alternative cover

Heard Ranier Ferguson is a studio album by 1980s jazz trio Heard Ranier Ferguson, composed of bassist John Heard, pianist Tom Ranier and drummer Sherman Ferguson.

== The album ==
The album was the third release for Californian record label ITI Records in 1983, then a fledgling label. It was Manufactured and marketed by Allegiance Records Ltd.

The album was what could be expected from a small jazz group such as Heard Ranier Ferguson. As an experienced trio they worked well together on it. Ranier's piano was the dominant sound with the presence of Heard's bass being felt. The material covered included classics from Count Basie, Duke Ellington and Billy Strayhorn etc.

=== Re-releases ===
The album first made it to compact disc in 1987 as Back To Back issued on Allegiance, expanded with three extra tracks that weren't on the original album. They were "Tricitism", "Tones for Joan's Bones" and "In Walked Bud".

It was announced on the Jazz Monthly website in 2012 that their album along with others by Ruth Price, Tom Garvin, Bill Mays and Red Mitchell were to be re-released that year as the ITI Records back catalogue was being released through Warrant Music. It has been released again in May 2015.

== Heard Ranier Ferguson ==
Track listing
No	Title	Composer	Time
A1	"No More Blues"	Jobim / Hendricks / Cavanaugh / De Moraes	6:48
A2	" Isfahan"	Ellington / Strayhorn	4:19
A3	"Prisms"	Tom Ranier	4:23
A4	"Limehouse Blues"	Furber / Braham	7:22
B1	"Corner Pocket"	William C. Basie	5:52
B2	"Anthropology"	Parker / Gillespie / Bishop	2:28
B3	"If I Should Lose You"	Robin Rainger	4:19
B4	"Mother And Child "	John Heard	7:54

Musicians
Instrument	Musician
Bass	John Heard
Drums	Sherman Ferguson
Piano	Tom Ranier
Reeds	Tom Ranier
Synthesizer	Tom Ranier

Technical and production
Role	Personnel
Executive producer	Michael Dion
Producers	A. James Liska; Michael Dion
Co-producer	Mike Grantham
Recording & Mixing engineer	Bernier Kirsch; Mad Hatter Studios (April 1983)
Mastering engineer Alshire International	Lanky Linstrot
Album cover design and design	Ervin Advertising
Project coordinator	Mike Foltz
Front cover illustration	John Heard
Front & back cover photography	Tom O'Brien
Portrait photography Back cover	Donna Zweig

Companies
Role	Company
Manufactured By	Allegiance
Mixed At	Mad Hatter Studios
Marketed By	Allegiance
Mastered At	Alshire International
Recorded At	Mad Hatter Studios

== Back To Back ==
Track listing
No	Title	Time
01	"No More Blues"	6:48
02	"Isfahan"	4:19
03	"Prisms"	4:23
04	"Limehouse Blues"	7:22
05	"Tricitism"	
06	"Tones For Joan's Bones"	
07	"In Walked Bud"	
08	"Corner Pocket"	5:52
09	"Anthropology"	2:28
10	"If I Should Lose You"	4:19
11	"Mother And Child"	7:54

Technical and production
Role	Personnel
Produced by	Michael Dion
Co-Produced by	Michael Grantham
Recording & mixing engineer	Bernie Hirsch; Mad hatter Studios
Mastering engineer	Lanky Linstrott; Alshire International
Project coordinator	Michael Foltz
Front cover illustration	John Heard

Compact Disc Credits
Role	Personnel
Digitally remixed & mastered at	Dave Pell Digital by Michael Boshears
Art director	Suzanne Kotnik
Design	Nadre Davani

== Releases ==
List
Title	Release info	Year	F	Notes
Heard Ranier Ferguson	ITI JL 003	1989	Record LP	
Heard Ranier Ferguson	ITI JC 003	1983	Cassette	
Back To Back	Allegiance CDP 72973	1987	Compact disc	
Back To Back	ITI Records Cat # 201201	2012	Compact disc	Re-release (August 21)
Back To Back	ITI Records Cat 201201	2015	Compact disc	Re-release (May 5)

== Reviews ==
- Review by Bob Karlovits of the Pittsburgh Express
