= Isfahan (song) =

1967 jazz song by Duke Ellington

Single by Duke Ellington

from the album The Far East Suite
- Released: 1967
- Recorded: December 1966
- Genre: Jazz
- Length: 4:02; 4:11 (alternative take)
- Label: Bluebird/RCA
- Songwriters: Billy Strayhorn; Duke Ellington
- Producer: Brad McKuen

Duke Ellington singles chronology
"Mynah" (1966)	"Isfahan" (1967)	"Depk" (1966)

"Isfahan" is a jazz piece credited to Billy Strayhorn and Duke Ellington and released on Ellington's 1967 album The Far East Suite; Isfahan is a city in Iran. It features long-time Ellington soloist Johnny Hodges on alto saxophone. It was originally called "Elf" when Strayhorn composed it, months before the 1963 Ellington orchestra world tour during which the group traveled to Iran.

== Legacy ==
In The Penguin Guide to Jazz, Richard Cook and Brian Morton have suggested that "'Isfahan' is arguably the most beautiful item in Ellington's and Strayhorn's entire output."

In 1988 the song was presented in Studio Sessions New York 1963 by LMR label and later on by the Saja Records.

== Notable covers ==
- 1980 – Heard Ranier Ferguson in album Heard Ranier Ferguson (Track #2)
- 1980 – Gary Burton in album Easy as Pie (Track #5)
- 1981 – Arnett Cobb in album Funky Butt (Track #7)
- 1985 – Joe Pass in album Akron Concert (Part #1 in track #6, Duke Ellington Medley)
- 1987 – Art Farmer in album Something to Live For (Track #1)
- 1992 – Joe Henderson in album Lush Life (Track #1)
- 1999 – André Previn in album We Got It Good and That Ain’t Bad: A Duke Ellington Songbook (Track #2)
- 2005 – Grace Kelly in album Times Too (Track #1)
- 2012 – Joe Jackson with Steve Vai in album The Duke (Track #1)

== Personnel ==
- Cootie Williams — trumpet
- William "Cat" Anderson — trumpet
- Mercer Ellington — trumpet & flugelhorn
- Herbie Jones — trumpet & flugelhorn
- Lawrence Brown — trombone
- Buster Cooper — trombone
- Chuck Connors — trombone
- Jimmy Hamilton — clarinet & tenor saxophone
- Johnny Hodges — alto saxophone (solo)
- Russell Procope — alto saxophone & clarinet
- Paul Gonsalves — tenor saxophone
- Harry Carney — baritone saxophone
- Duke Ellington — piano
- John Lamb — bass
- Rufus Jones — drums

== See also ==
- Duke Ellington discography
