= For the First Time (Count Basie album) =

Studio album by Count Basie
- Released: 1974
- Recorded: 1974
- Genre: Jazz
- Length: 49:51
- Label: Pablo
- Producer: Norman Granz

Count Basie chronology
The Bosses (1973)	For the First Time (1974)	Satch and Josh (1974)

Professional ratings
Review scores
Source	Rating
Allmusic	3/5 stars
The Rolling Stone Jazz Record Guide	4/5 stars
The Penguin Guide to Jazz Recordings	3/4 stars

For the First Time is a 1974 studio album by Count Basie, with bassist Ray Brown and drummer Louie Bellson. Basie, Brown and Bellson followed For the First Time with For the Second Time (1975).

== Track listing ==
1. "Baby Lawrence" (Count Basie) – 3:10
2. "Pres" (Basie) – 3:28
3. "I'll Always Be in Love With You" (Bud Green, Fred Ruby, Sam H. Stept) – 5:54
4. "Blues in the Church" (Basie) – 5:00
5. "Oh, Lady Be Good [Concept 1]" (George Gershwin, Ira Gershwin) – 5:32
6. "Oh, Lady Be Good [Concept 2]" (G. Gershwin, I. Gershwin) – 3:57
7. "Blues in the Alley" (Basie) – 6:44
8. "As Long as I Live" (Harold Arlen, Ted Koehler) – 3:33
9. "Song of the Islands" (Charles E. King) – 4:51
10. "Royal Gardens Blues" (Clarence Williams, Spencer Williams) – 4:28
11. "(Un) Easy Does It" (Sy Oliver, Trummy Young) – 4:08
12. "O.P." (Basie) – 4:48

== Personnel ==
- Count Basie - piano
- Ray Brown - double bass
- Louie Bellson - drums
