= Valley Vue Records =

- Founded: 1983
- Founder: Hillery Johnson
- Distributor: Capitol Records
- Genre: Rhythm and blues, Jazz
- Country of origin: United States
- Location: Palm Springs, California

Valley Vue Records was a record label in California founded by Hillery Johnson in 1983. Arirts on the label included Jerry Butler, Craig T. Cooper, Klymaxx, The Manhattans, Johnny "Guitar" Watson and Michael Wycoff.

== Background ==
It was a small California based record label located in Palm Springs. Its founder Hillery Johnson had produced artists such as Donny Hathaway. Johnson was also vice-president of Atlantic Records.

=== Staff ===
In addition to Johnson, the founder there was vice-president and general manager Michael Dion. Dion had founded the Jazz label ITI Records in California.

== Artists released ==
Johnny "Guitar" Watson's album Strike on Computers was released on Valley Vue VV69. after having a break from music for about three years, Watson ended up with Johnson in the studio after Johnson who had been a fan of his had suggested they go in and do something. As a result, Strike On Computers came about and was released on the label. In 1988, Chicago blues and soul singer, Cicero Blake had his album Too Hip To Be Happy released on the label. In the 1990s, R&B singer Lamarr K. Swing had his debut album which was actually called His Debut Album released on the label. It was manufactured and marketed by Valley Vue Records. It was produced by Lonnie Reaves and the executive producer was Hillery Johnson.

=== Reissues ===
Chuck Brown and the Soul Searchers had their album Bustin Loose reissued in the early 1990s on the label. Jerry Butler's 1994 album Simply Beautiful was also released on the label.

== Artists distributed ==
Tad Sisler's Jazz album So Good To Come Home To was distributed by Valley Vue in the US. The album featured Gerald Albright and Terri Lyne Carrington.

== Catalogue (selective) ==
=== Albums ===
- Johnny "Guitar" Watson – Strike On Computers - Valley Vue Records – ST-72943 (1987)
- 101 North - 101 North - Valley Vue Records – C1-90911 (1988)
- The Manhattans - Sweet Talk - Valley Vue Records – D1-72946 (1989)
- Craig T. Cooper - Craig T. Cooper Project - Valley Vue Records – D1-72947 (1989)
- Craig T. Cooper – Got-That-Thang - Valley Vue Records – D1-72992 (1990)
- Wayne Boyer – This One's For Me - Valley Vue Records – V1-61290 (1990)
