= Count Basie Meets Oscar Peterson – The Timekeepers =

Studio album by Count Basie, Oscar Peterson
- Released: 1983
- Recorded: February 21–22, 1978
- Genre: Jazz
- Length: 37:11
- Label: Pablo
- Producer: Norman Granz

Count Basie, Oscar Peterson chronology
Night Rider (1980)	Count Basie Meets Oscar Peterson – The Timekeepers (1983)	Yessir, That's My Baby (1986)

Professional ratings
Review scores
Source	Rating
AllMusic	4/5 stars
The Penguin Guide to Jazz Recordings	3/4 stars
The Rolling Stone Jazz Record Guide	3/5 stars

Count Basie Meets Oscar Peterson – The Timekeepers is a 1983 album by Oscar Peterson and Count Basie. It was recorded on February 21-22, 1978.

== Track listing ==
1. "Confessin'" (Doc Daugherty, Al J. Neiburg, Ellis Reynolds) – 4:51
2. "Soft Winds" (Benny Goodman, Fletcher Henderson) – 4:28
3. "Rent Party" (Count Basie, Oscar Peterson) – 9:27
4. "(Back Home Again In) Indiana" (James F. Hanley, Ballard MacDonald) – 3:11
5. "Hey, Raymond" (Basie, Peterson) – 5:34
6. "After You've Gone" (Henry Creamer, Turner Layton) – 4:56
7. "That's the One" (Basie, Peterson) – 5:12

== Personnel ==
Recorded February 21, 22, 1978 in Los Angeles:

- Count Basie – piano, organ
- Oscar Peterson – piano
- Louie Bellson – drums
- John Heard – double bass
- Val Valentin – engineer
- Norman Granz – producer, liner notes
