= The London Concert =

The London Concert may refer to:

- The London Concert (Derek Bailey and Evan Parker album), 1975
- The London Concert (Oscar Peterson album), 1978
- The London Concert (George Russell album), 1990
