= Satch and Josh...Again =

Studio album by Count Basie, Oscar Peterson
- Released: 1978
- Recorded: September 22, 1977
- Genre: Jazz
- Length: 39:15
- Label: Pablo
- Producer: Norman Granz

Count Basie, Oscar Peterson chronology
Satch and Josh (1974)	Satch and Josh...Again (1978)	Night Rider (1980)

Satch and Josh...Again is a 1978 album by Oscar Peterson and Count Basie.

== Critical reception ==
Professional ratings
Review scores
Source	Rating
AllMusic	3/5 stars
The Rolling Stone Jazz Record Guide	4/5 stars

The Bay State Banner wrote that "Oscar certainly is one of piano's most accomplished masters, and he smoothly modifies his usually intricate lines to merge with the Count's sparse and relaxed tempos."

== Track listing ==
1. "Roots" (Count Basie, Oscar Peterson) - 6:44
2. "Your Red Wagon" (Gene DePaul, Richard M. Jones, Don Raye) - 5:37
3. "Home Run" (Basie, Peterson) - 2:40
4. "Sweethearts on Parade" (Carmen Lombardo, Charles Newman) - 6:37
5. "Lil' Darlin'" (Neal Hefti) - 4:28
6. "The Time Is Right" (Peterson) - 4:31
7. "Cherry" (Don Redman) - 5:50
8. "Lester Leaps In" (Lester Young) - 4:49
9. "She's Funny That Way" (Neil Moret, Richard Whiting) - 5:38
10. "Lady Fitz" (Basie, Peterson) - 4:46

== Personnel ==
Recorded September 22, 1977, Group IV Recording Studios, Hollywood, Los Angeles, California:

- Count Basie - piano, organ
- Oscar Peterson - piano
- Louie Bellson - drums
- John Heard - double bass
- Nat Hentoff - liner notes
- Val Valentin - engineer
- Norman Granz - producer
