= The Gifted Ones =

Studio album by Count Basie & Dizzy Gillespie
- Released: 1979
- Recorded: 1977
- Genre: Jazz
- Length: 40:41
- Label: Pablo
- Producer: Norman Granz

Count Basie & Dizzy Gillespie chronology
Kansas City 5 (1977)	The Gifted Ones (1979)	Basie Jam: Montreux '77 (1977)

Dizzy Gillespie chronology
Free Ride (1977)	The Gifted Ones (1977)	Dizzy Gillespie Jam (1977)

The Gifted Ones is a 1979 studio album by Count Basie and Dizzy Gillespie.

== Reception ==
Professional ratings
Review scores
Source	Rating
AllMusic	2/5 stars
DownBeat	4/5 stars
The Rolling Stone Jazz Record Guide	4/5 stars
The Virgin Encyclopedia of Jazz	3/5 stars

In a review for AllMusic, Scott Yanow wrote: " The music is generally quite rewarding... but never reaches the great heights one might have expected." DownBeat assigned 4 stars. John McDonough's review concludes, "If there is no special higher ground reached through this welcome partnership, at least the ground that is held to firmly is rich in both tradition and contemporary wealth.

== Track listing ==
1. "Back to the Land" (Count Basie, Dizzy Gillespie) – 7:20
2. "Constantinople" (Gillespie) – 8:28
3. "You Got It" (Frank Foster) – 5:21
4. "St. James Infirmary Blues" (Irving Mills, Traditional) – 6:54
5. "Follow the Leader" (Basie, Gillespie) – 6:24
6. "Ow!" (Gillespie) – 6:14

== Personnel ==
- Count Basie – piano
- Dizzy Gillespie – trumpet
- Joe Pass – guitar
- Ray Brown – double bass
- Mickey Roker – drums
