= Basie Jam: Montreux '77 =

Live album by Count Basie
- Released: 1977
- Recorded: 1977
- Genre: Jazz
- Length: 47:59
- Label: Pablo
- Producer: Norman Granz

Count Basie chronology
The Gifted Ones (1977)	Basie Jam: Montreux '77 (1977)	Montreux '77 (1977)

Professional ratings
Review scores
Source	Rating
Allmusic	4/5 stars
The Rolling Stone Jazz Record Guide	4/5 stars

Basie Jam: Montreux '77 is a 1977 live album by Count Basie, recorded at the 1977 Montreux Jazz Festival.

== Track listing ==
1. "Bookie Blues" (Count Basie, Ray Brown, Benny Carter, Vic Dickenson, Roy Eldridge, Al Grey, Zoot Sims, Jimmie Smith) – 14:48
2. "She's Funny That Way" (Neil Moret, Richard A. Whiting) – 6:18
3. "These Foolish Things (Remind Me of You)" (Holt Marvell, Jack Strachey) – 4:33
4. "Kidney Stew" (Leona Blackman, Eddie Vinson) – 6:59
5. "Trio Blues" (Count Basie) – 4:00
6. "I Got It Bad (and That Ain't Good)" (Duke Ellington, Paul Francis Webster) – 3:56
7. "Jumpin' at the Woodside" (Basie) – 4:31

== Personnel ==
- Count Basie - piano
- Benny Carter - alto saxophone
- Zoot Sims - tenor saxophone
- Vic Dickenson - trombone
- Roy Eldridge - trumpet
- Ray Brown - double bass
- Jimmie Smith - drums
- Al Grey - Trombone
