= Montreux '77: Dizzy Gillespie Jam =

Live album by Dizzy Gillespie
- Released: 1977
- Recorded: July 14, 1977
- Venue: Montreux Jazz Festival, Montreux, Switzerland
- Genre: Jazz
- Length: 44:24
- Label: Pablo Live; 2308-211
- Producer: Norman Granz

Dizzy Gillespie chronology
The Gifted Ones (1977)	Montreux '77: Dizzy Gillespie Jam (1977)	The Trumpet Summit Meets the Oscar Peterson Big 4 (1979)

Reissue cover

Montreux '77: Dizzy Gillespie Jam is a live album by trumpeter Dizzy Gillespie, recorded at the Montreux Jazz Festival in 1977 and released on the Pablo label.

== Reception ==
Professional ratings
Review scores
Source	Rating
AllMusic	2/5 stars
Los Angeles Times	3.5/5 stars
Music Week	3/5 stars
The Rolling Stone Album Guide	3/5 stars

In a contemporary review, Music Week commented on Gillespie's continued popularity, adding that Montreux '77 is a jam session set that "finds Diz in sparkling form" aided by his bandmates, complimenting Gillespie's muted trumpet playing on "Girl of My Dreams" and Milt Jackson's poised playing on the ballad "But Beautiful" but particularly praising Jon Faddis for his "remarkable solo" on "Here's That Rainy Day".

The AllMusic review stated that "few fireworks occur in what should have been an explosive encounter".

== Track listing ==
1. "Girl of My Dreams" (Sunny Clapp) - 13:56
2. "Get Happy" (Harold Arlen, Ted Koehler) - 7:51
3. "Medley: Once in a While/But Beautiful/Here's That Rainy Day" (Michael Edwards, Bud Green/Johnny Burke, James Van Heusen/Burke, Van Heusen) - 13:03
4. "The Champ" (Dizzy Gillespie) - 9:34

== Personnel ==
- Dizzy Gillespie, John Faddis – trumpet
- Milt Jackson – vibraphone
- Monty Alexander – piano
- Ray Brown – bass
- Jimmie Smith – drums
