= Free Ride (album) =

Studio album by Dizzy Gillespie and Lalo Schifrin
- Released: 1977
- Recorded: January 31 and February 1 & 2, 1977
- Studio: Wally Heider Recording Studios, Hollywood, California
- Genre: Jazz
- Length: 43:27
- Label: Pablo; 2310-794
- Producer: Lalo Schifrin

Dizzy Gillespie chronology
Dizzy's Party (1976)	Free Ride (1977)	The Gifted Ones (1977)

Free Ride is an album by trumpeter Dizzy Gillespie that was composed, arranged and conducted by Lalo Schifrin, recorded in 1977 and released on the Pablo label. The album represents the first collaboration between the two since The New Continent in 1962.

== Reception ==
The AllMusic review stated: "The things that make Schifrin an anathema to the diehards -- the huge orchestras, the pop and soul riffs, the general air of over the top theatricality -- are all over 1977's Free Ride, his reunion date with Dizzy Gillespie... it's very much a record of and for its time".

Professional ratings
Review scores
Source	Rating
AllMusic	3/5 stars
The Penguin Guide to Jazz Recordings	1.5/4 stars
The Rolling Stone Jazz Record Guide	1/5 stars

== Track listing ==
All compositions by Lalo Schifrin

1. "Unicorn" - 6:48
2. "Fire Dance" - 4:25
3. "Incantation" - 6:40
4. "Wrong Number" - 4:36
5. "Free Ride" - 5:22
6. "Ozone Madness" - 6:34
7. "Love Poem for Donna" - 4:33
8. "The Last Stroke of Midnight" - 4:29

== Personnel ==
- Dizzy Gillespie - trumpet
- Lalo Schifrin - keyboards, arranger, conductor
- Oscar Brashear, Jack H. Laubach - trumpet
- Lew McCreary - trombone
- Jerome Richardson - flute
- Ernie Watts - saxophone
- James Horn - saxophone, flute
- Sonny Burke - piano, electric piano
- Charles E. Spangler - synthesizer
- Ray Parker Jr., Lee Ritenour, Wah Wah Watson - guitar
- Wilton Felder - bass
- Ed Greene - drums
- Paulinho Da Costa - percussion
