= I Told You So (Count Basie album) =

Studio album by Count Basie and Orchestra
- Released: 1976
- Recorded: January 12–14, 1976
- Genre: Swing; Big band
- Length: 47:37
- Label: Pablo
- Producer: Norman Granz

Count Basie and Orchestra chronology
For the Second Time (1975)	I Told You So (1976)	Basie Jam 2 (1976)

Professional ratings
Review scores
Source	Rating
Allmusic	4/5 stars
The Penguin Guide to Jazz Recordings	3/4 stars

I Told You So is a 1976 album recorded at RCA studios, New York City on January 12, 13 and 14 1976 and released in 1976, featuring Count Basie and his orchestra. All the titles were arranged by Bill Holman. Sound engineer was Bob Simpson and the tape editor was Ben Jordan. The producer was Norman Granz.

The disc was issued on the Pablo Records label and marketed by Polydor.

== Track listing ==
1. "Tree Frog" – 5:15
2. "Flirt" – 5:52
3. "Blues for Alfy" – 4:42
4. "Something to Live For" (Duke Ellington, Billy Strayhorn) – 3:41
5. "Plain Brown Wrapper" – 4:22
6. "Swee'Pea" – 4:36
7. "Ticker" – 4:37
8. "Too Close for Comfort" (Jerry Bock, George David Weiss, Larry Holofcener) – 4:10
9. "Told You So" – 6:28
10. "The Git" – 3:54

All music composed by Bill Holman unless otherwise noted.

== Personnel ==
The Count Basie Orchestra

- Count Basie - piano
- Sonny Cohn - trumpet
- Pete Minger - trumpet
- Bobby Mitchell - trumpet
- John Thomas - trumpet
- Jack Feierman - trumpet
- Al Grey - trombone
- Curtis Fuller - trombone
- Bill Hughes - trombone
- Mel Wanzo - trombone
- Bobby Plater - alto saxophone
- Danny Turner - alto saxophone
- Jimmy Forrest - tenor saxophone
- Eric Dixon - tenor saxophone
- Charlie Fowlkes - baritone saxophone
- John Duke - double bass
- Freddie Green - guitar
- Butch Miles - drums
