= Satch and Josh =

Studio album by Count Basie, Oscar Peterson
- Released: 1974
- Recorded: December 2, 1974, Los Angeles, CA
- Genre: Jazz
- Length: 51:25
- Label: Pablo
- Producer: Norman Granz

Count Basie, Oscar Peterson chronology
Satch and Josh (1974)	Satch and Josh...Again (1978)

Oscar Peterson chronology
Oscar Peterson and The Trumpet Kings - Jousts (1974)	Satch and Josh (1974)	The Giants (1974)

Professional ratings
Review scores
Source	Rating
Allmusic	4.5/5 stars
The Rolling Stone Jazz Record Guide	4/5 stars
The Penguin Guide to Jazz Recordings	3/4 stars

Satch and Josh is a 1974 album by Oscar Peterson and Count Basie.

== Track listing ==
1. "Buns" (Count Basie, Oscar Peterson) - 4:35
2. "These Foolish Things (Remind Me of You)" (Harry Link, Holt Marvell, Jack Strachey) - 5:42
3. "R.B." (Basie, Peterson) - 5:34
4. "Burnin'" (Basie, Peterson) - 4:13
5. "Exactly Like You" (Dorothy Fields, Jimmy McHugh) - 6:18
6. "Jumpin' at the Woodside" (Basie) - 2:53
7. "Louie B." (Basie, Peterson) - 6:20
8. "Lester Leaps In" (Lester Young) - 4:07
9. "Big Stockings" (Basie, Peterson) - 4:27
10. "S & J Blues" (Basie, Peterson) - 7:52

== Personnel ==
- Count Basie - piano, organ
- Oscar Peterson - piano
- Freddie Green - guitar
- Ray Brown - double bass
- Louie Bellson - drums
- Benny Green - liner notes
- Norman Granz - producer

Recorded December 2, 1974, Group IV Recording Studios, Hollywood, Los Angeles, California:
