= For the Second Time =

Studio album by Count Basie
- Released: 1975
- Recorded: August 28, 1975
- Genre: Jazz
- Length: 49:51
- Label: Pablo
- Producer: Norman Granz

Count Basie chronology
Basie Big Band (1975)	For the Second Time (1975)	I Told You So (1976)

Professional ratings
Review scores
Source	Rating
Allmusic	3/5 stars
The Penguin Guide to Jazz Recordings	3/4 stars

For the Second Time is a 1975 studio album by Count Basie, with bassist Ray Brown and drummer Louie Bellson, the sequel to their 1974 album For the First Time.

== Track listing ==
1. "Sandman" (Count Basie, Ray Brown) – 5:48
2. "If I Could Be with You (One Hour Tonight)" (Henry Creamer, James P. Johnson) – 4:05
3. "Draw" (Basie, Brown) – 3:38
4. "On the Sunny Side of the Street" (Dorothy Fields, Jimmy McHugh) – 5:24
5. "The One I Love (Belongs to Somebody Else)" (Isham Jones, Gus Kahn) – 4:49
6. "Blues for Eric" (Basie, Brown) – 6:27
7. "I Surrender Dear" (Harry Barris, Gordon Clifford) – 4:59
8. "Racehorse" (Basie, Brown) – 3:23

== Personnel ==
- Count Basie - piano
- Ray Brown - double bass
- Louie Bellson - drums
