= Kansas City 7 =

Studio album by Count Basie
- Released: 1980
- Recorded: April 10, 1980
- Genre: Jazz
- Length: 53:28
- Label: Pablo
- Producer: Norman Granz

Count Basie chronology
Kansas Shout (1980)	Kansas City 7 (1980)	Warm Breeze (1981)

Professional ratings
Review scores
Source	Rating
AllMusic	3/5 stars
The Penguin Guide to Jazz Recordings	3/4 stars

Kansas City 7 is a 1980 studio album by Count Basie.

== Track listing ==
1. "Jaylock" (Count Basie, Eddie "Lockjaw" Davis, Freddie Hubbard, Joe Pass) – 7:17
2. "Exactly Like You" (Dorothy Fields, Jimmy McHugh) – 8:00
3. "I'll Always Be in Love With You" (Bud Green, Herman Ruby, Sam Stept) – 7:29
4. "If I Could Be with You (One Hour Tonight)" (Henry Creamer, James P. Johnson) – 6:20
5. "Honi Coles" (Basie, Davis, Hubbard, J. J. Johnson) – 6:48
6. "Blues for Norman" (Basie, Davis, Hubbard, J. J. Johnson) – 8:51
7. "Count Me In" (Basie) – 9:12

== Personnel ==
- Count Basie - piano
- Eddie "Lockjaw" Davis - tenor saxophone
- J. J. Johnson - trombone
- Freddie Hubbard - trumpet
- Joe Pass - guitar
- John Heard - double bass
- Jake Hanna - drums
