= Kansas City 5 =

Studio album by Count Basie
- Released: 1977
- Recorded: January 26, 1977
- Genre: Jazz
- Length: 47:59
- Label: Pablo Today
- Producer: Norman Granz

Count Basie chronology
Prime Time (1977)	Kansas City 5 (1977)	The Gifted Ones (1977)

Professional ratings
Review scores
Source	Rating
Allmusic	2.5/5 stars
The Penguin Guide to Jazz Recordings	3/4 stars

Kansas City 5 is a 1977 studio album by Count Basie.

== Track listing ==
1. "Jive at Five" (Count Basie, Harry "Sweets" Edison) – 5:30
2. "One O'Clock Jump" (Basie) – 3:53
3. "(We Ain't Got) No Special Thing" (Basie, Milt Jackson, Joe Pass) – 5:33
4. "Memories of You" (Eubie Blake, Andy Razaf) – 3:49
5. "Frog's Blues" (Basie, Jackson, Pass) – 4:55
6. "Rabbit" (Basie, Jackson, Pass) – 3:46
7. "Perdido" (Ervin Drake, Hans J. Lengsfelder, Juan Tizol) – 4:27
8. "Timekeeper" (Basie, Jackson, Pass) – 5:12
9. "Mean to Me" (Fred E. Ahlert, Roy Turk) – 5:00
10. "Blues for Joe Turner" (Basie, Jackson) – 4:55

== Personnel ==
- Count Basie - piano
- Milt Jackson - vibraphone
- Joe Pass - guitar
- John Heard - double bass
- Louie Bellson - drums
