= Far East Suite =

1967 album by Duke Ellington

Studio album by Duke Ellington
- Released: June 1967
- Recorded: December 19–21, 1966
- Studio: New York City
- Genre: Jazz, big band
- Length: 45:14
- Label: Bluebird/RCA
- Producer: Brad McKuen

Duke Ellington chronology
The Popular Duke Ellington (1967)	Far East Suite (1967)	...And His Mother Called Him Bill (1968)

Far East Suite is a 1967 concept album by American jazz musician Duke Ellington, inspired by his group's tour of Asia. Ellington and longtime collaborator Billy Strayhorn wrote the compositions.

Strayhorn died in May 1967, making Far East Suite one of the last albums recorded during his life to feature his compositions. The album won the Grammy Award in 1968 for Best Instrumental Jazz Performance – Large Group or Soloist with Large Group.

The album was reissued in 1995 with four previously unreleased alternate takes. In 2003, Bluebird Records issued the album on CD with additional bonus takes.

== Background ==
The album's title is something of a misnomer. As critics Richard Cook and Brian Morton wrote, "It really should have been The Near East Suite." Strictly speaking, only one track – "Ad Lib on Nippon", inspired by a 1964 tour of Japan – is concerned with a country in the "Far East". The rest of the music on the album was inspired by a world tour undertaken by Ellington and his orchestra in 1963, which included performances in Damascus, Amman, Ramall'ah, Kabul, New Delhi, Hyderabad, Bangalore (now Bengaluru), Madras (now Chennai), Bombay (now Mumbai), Calcutta (now Kolkata), Colombo, Kandy, Dacca (now Dhaka), Lahore, Karachi, Tehran, Isfahan, Abadan, Baghdad, and Beirut. The band arrived in Ankara but U.S. President John F. Kennedy was assassinated the day before its concert, and the State Department cancelled the tour. Scheduled performances in Istanbul, Nicosia, Cairo, Alexandria, Athens, Thessaloniki, and a week added to the tour for Yugoslavia were cancelled.

In early 1964, while on tour in England, Ellington and Strayhorn performed four pieces of music for the first time ("Mynah", "Depk", "Agra", and "Amad"), which they called "Expressions of the Far East". By the time of the recording sessions in December 1966 Ellington and Strayhorn had added four more pieces. One, the latter's "Isfahan" was formerly known as "Elf", and had in fact been written months prior to the 1963 tour.

== Featured Soloists ==
Most of the tracks on Far East Suite spotlight the talents of particular members of the orchestra:

- "Tourist Point of View" – Paul Gonsalves, tenor saxophone
- "Bluebird of Delhi (Mynah)" – Jimmy Hamilton, clarinet
- "Isfahan" – Johnny Hodges, alto saxophone
- "Mount Harissa" – Gonsalves and Ellington
- "Blue Pepper (Far East of the Blues)" – Hodges and Cat Anderson, trumpet
- "Agra" – Harry Carney, baritone saxophone
- "Amad" – Lawrence Brown, trombone
- "Ad Lib on Nippon" – Ellington and Hamilton

== Reception ==
Professional ratings
Review scores
Source	Rating
AllMusic	3/5 stars
DownBeat	5/5 stars
The Penguin Guide to Jazz	4/4 stars

Jazz critic Dan Morgenstern wrote in his DownBeat review of the album that Ellington "has added the colors and textures of the Orient to his brilliant palette, and has given us riches on top of riches". He also said that Strayhorn "has enriched his legacy. It is encouraging that music of such strength and beauty can be created in our troublesome times."

Participating in DownBeat's Blindfold Test shortly after the album's release, composer-arranger Clare Fischer was played track No. 7, "Agra". A longtime admirer and student of Ellington's work, Fischer had no trouble identifying the artist, awarding the track five stars, citing both "Duke's immensely creative writing" and his inexplicable ability to transcend "this same old tired instrumentation of trumpets, trombones and saxophones", while "perfect[ly] utilizing the men's specific sounds". In addition, Fischer praised Ellington's ability to "take an exotic-sounding idea and create something—you might call it sophisticated crudity. It gives both qualities that I look for—an earthy quality and the sophisticated quality".

Cook and Morton, writing for The Penguin Guide to Jazz, gave the album a four-star rating (out of four), noting that "Ellington's ability to communicate points of contact and conflict between cultures, assimilating the blues to Eastern modes in tracks like 'Blue Pepper (Far East of the Blues)', never sounds unduly self-conscious. This remains a postwar peak." Scott Yanow, writing for AllMusic, calls this one of Ellington's "more memorable recordings", describing it as an example of "Ellington and Strayhorn in their late prime," and as such, "quite essential".

EJazzLines notes that the album "is one of the more interesting and unique creations in the Ellington/Strayhorn oeuvre. It's a reflective, evocative, virtuosic, impressionistic aural tour through the East ... as seen through the eyes and ears of two men who were musical visionaries and who had musicians behind them who were capable of vividly enunciating their visions. ... The overall cohesiveness and maturity of the suite can partly be attributed to its long gestation period, as pieces were refined and re-worked over a lengthy period of time. They came together to form what is generally considered to be one of Ellington and Strayhorn’s masterpieces."

== Legacy ==
Ellington very rarely performed the pieces that made up The Far East Suite. Cook and Morton have suggested that "Isfahan", which later became a jazz standard, "is arguably the most beautiful item in Ellington's and Strayhorn's entire output". In 1999, Anthony Brown recorded the entire suite with his Asian-American Orchestra. Unlike the 1967 album, Brown's version used Eastern instruments along with standard jazz instruments.

== Track listing ==
All compositions by Ellington and Strayhorn, except No. 9 by Ellington

1. "Tourist Point of View" – 5:09
2. "Bluebird of Delhi (Mynah)" – 3:18
3. "Isfahan" – 4:02
4. "Depk" – 2:38
5. "Mount Harissa" – 7:40
6. "Blue Pepper (Far East of the Blues)" – 3:00
7. "Agra" – 2:35
8. "Amad" – 4:26
9. "Ad Lib on Nippon" – 11:34
  1995 reissue bonus tracks
10. "Tourist Point of View" (alternative take) – 4:58
11. "Bluebird of Delhi (Mynah)" (alternative take) – 3:08
12. "Isfahan" (alternative take) – 4:11
13. "Amad" (alternative take) – 4:15

== Personnel ==
- Duke Ellington – piano
- Mercer Ellington – trumpet, flugelhorn
- Herbie Jones – trumpet, flugelhorn
- William "Cat" Anderson – trumpet
- Cootie Williams – trumpet
- Lawrence Brown – trombone
- Buster Cooper – trombone
- Chuck Connors – bass trombone
- Johnny Hodges – alto saxophone
- Russell Procope – alto saxophone, clarinet
- Jimmy Hamilton – tenor saxophone, clarinet
- Paul Gonsalves – tenor saxophone
- Harry Carney – baritone saxophone
- John Lamb – double bass
- Rufus Jones – drums
