= Sumi-e (Toshiko Akiyoshi – Lew Tabackin Big Band album) =

Studio album by Toshiko Akiyoshi – Lew Tabackin Big Band
- Released: 1979
- Recorded: Iruma City Auditorium, Saitama, Japan, 1979 February 2, 3
- Genre: Jazz
- Length: ~32:30 (original LP release)
- Label: Insights
- Producer: Hiroshi Isaka

Toshiko Akiyoshi – Lew Tabackin Big Band chronology
Salted Gingko Nuts (1978)	Sumi-e (1979)	Farewell (1980)

Professional ratings
Review scores
Source	Rating
Allmusic link	3.5/5 stars

Sumi-e (Sumi-e, Toshiko Akiyoshi - Lew Tabackin Big Band '79) is the seventh studio recording released by the Toshiko Akiyoshi – Lew Tabackin Big Band. It is not to be confused with the 1971 Toshiko Akiyoshi Quartet release, Sumie / The Personal Aspect in Jazz. Sumi-e (すみ絵) refers to an East Asian style of brush painting.

== Track listing ==
All songs composed and arranged by Toshiko Akiyoshi:

LP Side A:

1. "Sumi-e"
2. "Hangin' Loose"

LP Side B:

1. "Quadrille, Anyone?"
2. "A-10-205932"

=== CD re-issue ===
1. "Sumi-e" – 7:56
2. "A-10-205932" – 10:03
3. "A-10-205932" – 9:52 (alternate take)
4. "Hangin' Loose" – 8:46
5. "Quadrille, Anyone?" – 5:50
6. "Quadrille, Anyone?" – 5:55 (alternate take)

== Personnel ==
- Toshiko Akiyoshi – piano
- Lew Tabackin – tenor saxophone and flute
- Tom Peterson – tenor saxophone
- Gary Foster – alto saxophone
- Dick Spencer – alto saxophone
- Bill Byrne – baritone saxophone
- Steven Huffsteter – trumpet
- Bobby Shew – trumpet
- Mike Price – trumpet
- Larry Ford – trumpet
- Bill Reichenbach Jr. – trombone
- Randy Aldcroft – trombone
- Rick Culver – trombone
- Phil Teele – bass trombone
- John Heard – bass
- Peter Donald – drums

Guest artist:

- Kisaku Katada – percussion

== References / external links ==
- Insights 6061 (RVC RVJ-6061)
- Allmusic
