= Michael Dion =

Canadian record producer

- Also known as: Mike Dion
- Genres: Jazz
- Occupations: Record producer, Record executive
- Years active: 1980s, late 90s to present
- Labels: ABC; ITI Records; Mobile Fidelity; Phonodisc; Springboard; Valley Vue Records
- Website: ITI Music Live

Michael Dion is a record producer in jazz music and the owner of the California-based record label, ITI Records. He also was the owner of Startup Marketing and has had directorial and managerial positions with record labels such as ABC Records, Mobile Fidelity and Valley Vue Records. He is also an author of several books.

== Background ==
In the music business, Dion has worked for Texas-based wholesaler, Music Distributors Inc.. He was the founder of Startup Marketing, a San Diego music label representation and distribution firm. It was later acquired by Paulstarr. Some of the record labels he worked for were Springboard and Phonodisc. He also worked for ABC Records in various roles and was also director of field operations for the firm. In 1979, he began working for Mobile Fidelity as its Western regional sales manager. Working for the well-known audiophile record label, which was based in Chatsworth, California, he was promoted to the position of national sales director in early 1980. In December that year, it was announced that he was made director of its international sales and marketing. Towards the end of 1981 he had been promoted to the position of vice-president of international sales. In April 1985, he became vice-president of Mobile Fidelity Sound Lab, replacing Mark Wexler who relocated to the East Coast.

He also held the upper executive position of vice-president and general manager of a small Californian record label Valley Vue Records, which was founded by Hillery Johnson.

== ITI Records ==
In the early 1980s, he founded ITI Records, a Jazz record label. He also expressed interest in releasing other genres. One of them was classical.

In 1998, Dion had a break from the industry having been recalled to military service as a result of the Bosnian and Middle East wars. After he retired from military service, returned to the music industry and his record label ITI records became active again.

== Production ==
It was announced in the October 8, 1983 issue of Cashbox Michael Dion and Michael Grantham had formed a production company to produce jazz and classical artists. The name of the company was In The Interest Productions. Some of the albums he has produced are Blackberry Winter by Mike Campbell & Tom Garvin, Blue Sud by Marc Devine and Art Johnson. He was the executive producer for Cozzetti & Gemmill's album Soft Flower in Spring which was released in 1983.

By the time his record label ITI records had 15 albums in its catalogue, he arranged a deal for a different genre, Dance! The act was Zone Patrol and the labels first venture into that genre.

=== Acts produced (selective) ===
Film
Act	Label	Release	Year	Role	Notes #
Heard Ranier Ferguson	Heard Ranier Ferguson	ITI Records JL 003	1983	Producer	
Mike Campbell & Tom Garvin	Blackberry Winter	ITI Records JL 009	1984	Executive producer	
Cozzetti & Gemmill	Soft Flower in Spring	ITI Records JL 018	1984	Executive producer	
Seventh Avenue	Heads Up	ITI Records JL 022	1984	Executive producer	
Dwayne Smith & Art Johnson	Heartbound	Mobile Fidelity Sound Lab, CAFE L-729	1985	Executive producer, co-producer	
Steve Bach	Holiday	Mobile Fidelity Sound Lab / Cafe Records CAFE L-733	1985	Executive producer	
Windows	Windows	Intima Records SJ-73219	1987	Executive Producer	
Heard Ranier Ferguson	Back to Back	Allegiance Records CDP 72973	1987	Producer, executive producer	
Doug Duke & Company	The Music Room	Valley Vue Records 22013	1994	Compilation producer, research	
Steve Bach	Now and Then	Valley Vue Records 220033	1993	Research	
Marc Devine & Art Johnson	Blue Sud	ITI Records 201301	2013/2014	Research	

== Publications ==
Film
Title	Release info	Year	ISBN	Notes #
Circle of Chance	ITI Music Corporation	2012	9780999568408	
The Music Disc Murder	ITI Music Corporation	2018	9780999568422	
Saratoga Springs	ITI Music Corporation	2018	9780999568439	
Music is Life...and Death	ITI Music Corporation	2019	9780999568453	

== Personal ==
He is married to Laura Evaneski, author of Gone Too Soon.

== Recent activity ==
In January 2015, he attended the Jazz Connect Conference that was held at Saint Peter's Church, New York City, located at 54th and Lexington. But because of the amount of attendees, the usual venue being the Hilton New York was changed to the Church.
