= Basie Jam 3 =

Studio album by Count Basie
- Released: 1976
- Recorded: 1976
- Genre: Jazz
- Length: 48:28
- Label: Pablo
- Producer: Norman Granz

Count Basie chronology
Basie Jam 2 (1976)	Basie Jam 3 (1976)	Prime Time (1976)

Professional ratings
Review scores
Source	Rating
Allmusic	3/5 stars
The Penguin Guide to Jazz Recordings	2.5/4 stars
DownBeat	5/5 stars

Basie Jam 3 is a 1976 studio album by Count Basie, produced at the same sessions as Basie Jam 2.

== Track listing ==
1. "Bye Bye Blues" (David Bennett, Chauncey Gray, Frederick Hamm, Bert Lown) – 9:42
2. "Moten Swing" (Bennie Moten, Buster Moten) – 9:48
3. "I Surrender Dear" (Harry Barris, Gordon Clifford) – 6:48
4. "Song of the Islands" (Charles E. King) – 9:55

== Personnel ==
- Count Basie - piano
- Benny Carter - alto saxophone
- Eddie "Lockjaw" Davis - tenor saxophone
- Al Grey - trombone
- Clark Terry - trumpet
- Joe Pass - guitar
- John Heard - double bass
- Louie Bellson - drums
