= Night Rider (album) =

Studio album by Count Basie, Oscar Peterson
- Released: 1980
- Recorded: February 21–22, 1978
- Genre: Jazz
- Length: 39:15
- Label: Pablo
- Producer: Norman Granz

Count Basie, Oscar Peterson chronology
Satch and Josh...Again (1978)	Night Rider (1980)	Count Basie Meets Oscar Peterson - The Timekeepers (1983)

Professional ratings
Review scores
Source	Rating
Allmusic	3/5 stars
The Penguin Guide to Jazz Recordings	3/4 stars

Night Rider is an album by Oscar Peterson and Count Basie.

== Track listing ==
1. "Night Rider" (Oscar Peterson) - 12:38
2. "Memories of You" (Eubie Blake, Andy Razaf) - 4:55
3. "9:20 Special" (William Engvick, Earle Warren) - 3:16
4. "Sweet Lorraine" (Cliff Burwell, Mitchell Parish) - 7:03
5. "It's a Wonderful World" (Harold Adamson, Jan Savitt, Johnny Watson) - 3:17
6. "Blues for Pamela" (Count Basie, Peterson) - 8:06

== Personnel ==
Recorded February 21, 22, 1978 in Los Angeles:

- Count Basie - piano, organ
- Oscar Peterson - piano
- Louie Bellson - drums
- John Heard - double bass
- Nat Hentoff - liner notes
- Val Valentin - engineer
- Greg Fulginiti - mastering
- Norman Granz - producer
