= Basie Jam 2 =

Studio album by Count Basie
- Released: 1976
- Recorded: 1976
- Genre: Jazz
- Length: 48:28
- Label: Pablo
- Producer: Norman Granz

Count Basie chronology
I Told You So (1976)	Basie Jam 2 (1976)	Basie Jam 3 (1976)

Professional ratings
Review scores
Source	Rating
Allmusic	3/5 stars
The Penguin Guide to Jazz Recordings	3/4 stars

Basie Jam 2 is a 1976 studio album by Count Basie, the follow-up to 1973's Basie Jam.

== Track listing ==
1. "Mama Don't Wear No Drawers" (Count Basie, Benny Carter, Clark Terry) – 12:33
2. "Doggin' Around" (Edgar Battle, Herschel Evans) – 10:59
3. "Kansas City Line" (Count Basie, Louie Bellson, Benny Carter, Eddie "Lockjaw" Davis, Al Grey, John Heard, Joe Pass, Clark Terry) – 14:57
4. "Jump" (Basie, Carter, J.J. Johnson, Terry) – 9:59

== Personnel ==
- Count Basie - piano
- Benny Carter - alto saxophone
- Eddie "Lockjaw" Davis - tenor saxophone
- Al Grey - trombone
- Clark Terry - trumpet
- Joe Pass - guitar
- John Heard - double bass
- Louie Bellson - drums
