= Yessir, That's My Baby (album) =

Studio album by Count Basie, Oscar Peterson
- Released: 1986
- Recorded: February 21, 1978
- Genre: Jazz
- Length: 43:37
- Label: Pablo
- Producer: Norman Granz

Professional ratings
Review scores
Source	Rating
AllMusic	3/5 stars
The Penguin Guide to Jazz Recordings	3/4 stars
The Rolling Stone Album Guide	2.5/5 stars
Windsor Star	A−

Yessir, That's My Baby is an album by Oscar Peterson and Count Basie.

== Track listing ==
1. "Blues for Roy" (Count Basie, Oscar Peterson) - 6:00
2. "Teach Me Tonight" (Sammy Cahn, Gene de Paul) - 3:57
3. "Joe Turner" (Basie, Peterson) - 8:58
4. "Blues for C.T." (Basie, Peterson) - 2:53
5. "Yes Sir, That's My Baby" (Walter Donaldson, Gus Kahn) - 5:35
6. "Tea for Two" (Irving Caesar, Vincent Youmans) - 5:49
7. "After You've Gone" (Henry Creamer, Turner Layton) - 5:09
8. "Poor Butterfly" (John Golden, Raymond Hubbell) - 5:16

== Personnel ==
Recorded February 21, 1978, Group IV Recording Studios, Hollywood, Los Angeles, California

- Count Basie – piano, organ
- Oscar Peterson – piano
- John Heard – double bass
- Louie Bellson – drums
- Benny Green – liner notes
- Norman Granz – producer
