= ITI Records =

Jazz record label in Van Nuys, California

- Founded: 1982
- Founder: Michael Dion
- Genre: Jazz
- Country of origin: U.S.
- Location: Van Nuys, California
- Official website: www.itimusic.com

ITI Records is a record label from Van Nuys, California that specializes in mainly jazz records.

== Background ==
ITI's original owner was producer Mike Dion. An article in the October 1983 Billboard magazine said that he had taken on a partner, Mike Ervin, of Ervin Advertising & Design, who was to play an active role. It also indicated that musician John Heard, who had a release of his own as part of the trio Heard Ranier Ferguson, was going to be used as a graphic artist for the label. He was to be marketed as both an artist and a musician.

In September 2012, it was announced on the All About Jazz website that after being dormant for some time, and 30 years after its beginning, ITI Records was returning to re-release its catalog. It also said that new titles would be released.

Dion, who had retired from military service, had returned to the music industry. He had been previously recalled to active naval duty in 1998. This was due to the Bosnian and Middle East wars.

== Artists ==
Some of the artists who have had LP releases on the label are Seventh Avenue with their debut album Heads Up, Bill Mays and Red Mitchell with their album Two of a Mind, Slider Glenn (aka Dan Slider) and Dan Glenn with Whispered Warning, and John Heard, Tom Ranier and Sherman Ferguson with their self-titled album. In 2013, Lenny Carlson had his album In the Mud re-released digitally. A section from that album earned a 1985 Grammy nomination for Best Jazz Instrumental Composition.

== Specs ==
An example of manufacture and marketing is the Heard, Ranier, Ferguson LP which was manufactured and marketed by Allegiance Records Ltd.

As of 2012, its records were to be re-released through Warrant Music.

== Selected releases ==
=== LP ===
- Tom Garvin - In 3 Dimensions - ITI Records JL 001 (1982)
- Ruth Price – Lucky to Be Me - ITI Records JL 002 (1983)
- Heard Ranier Ferguson – Heard Ranier Ferguson - ITI Records JL 003 (1983)
- Bill Mays, Red Mitchell – Two of a Mind - ITI Records JL 004
- Wayne Johnson Trio – Grasshopper - ITI Records JL 005 (1983)
- Illusion - Illusion – ITI Records JL 006 (1984)
- Lou Rovner – Small Big Band - ITI Records JL 007 (1984)
- Estelle Reiner – Just in Time - ITI Records JL 008 (1984)
- Mike Campbell and Tom Garvin – Blackberry Winter JL 009 (1984)
- Kenny Pore – Inner City Dreams - ITI Records JL 010 (1984)
- Lenny Carlson – In the Mud - ITI Records JL 11 (?)
- Jerry Tachoir Quartet – Canvas - ITI Records JL 012
- Jimmy Mosher Quintet Featuring Mick Goodrick - Satyric Horn - ITI Records JL 015
- Cozzetti & Gemmill – Soft Flower In Spring - ITI Records JL 18 (1984)
- Windows - Windows - ITI Records JL 021 (1984)
- Seventh Avenue – Heads Up - ITI Records JL 022 (1984)
- Richard Elliot – Initial Approach - ITI Records JL 030 (1984)
- Slider Glenn – Whispered Warning - ITI Records JL 031 (1984)
- Terry Bonnell – Handwrought - ITI Records ST-72957 (1987)

=== 7" 45 ===
- Daryle Chinn – "Be My Love" / "Baja Pacifica" - IT Records B-1-75722 (1989)

=== 12" 45 ===
- Daryle Chinn – A1 "Be My Love" (Dance Mix), A2 "Be My Love" (Edit Version) / B "Be My Love" (Extended Version) - ITI Records – V-75302 (1989)

=== CD ===
- Highland Project - Highland Project - ITI Records 705CD - 1991

== Links ==
- Official site
- Billboard Article: Fledgling ITA Label Maps Ambitious Plans
