= The London Concert (Oscar Peterson album) =

Live album by Oscar Peterson
- Released: 1979
- Recorded: October 21, 1978
- Genre: Jazz
- Length: 46:22
- Label: Pablo
- Producer: Norman Granz

The London Concert is a live album by jazz pianist Oscar Peterson, accompanied by John Heard, and Louie Bellson.

== Reception ==
Professional ratings
Review scores
| Source | Rating |
|---|---|
| Allmusic | 4/5 stars |
| The Rolling Stone Jazz Record Guide | 3/5 stars |
| The Penguin Guide to Jazz Recordings | 3.5/4 stars |
| DownBeat | 5/5 stars |

Writing for Allmusic, music critic Scott Yanow wrote of the album "Whether it be on rapid stomps or sensitive ballads, this trio (which was in reality an all-star pickup group) sounds as if they had worked together regularly for years."

DownBeat assigned the album 5 stars. Reviewer Bradley Sparrow wrote, "On trio dates before, Peterson developed a distinct style or approach to each tune. Today the structure of his approaches incorporates elements of late romantic classical music and the innovations of the jazz avant garde".

== Track listing ==
1. "It's a Wonderful World" (Harold Adamson, Jan Savitt, Johnny Watson) – 5:33
2. "People" (Bob Merrill, Jule Styne) – 8:02
3. "Ain't Misbehavin'" (Harry Brooks, Andy Razaf, Fats Waller) – 5:07
4. "Jitterbug Waltz" (Richard Maltby, Jr., Waller) – 5:40
5. "Pennies from Heaven" (Johnny Burke, Arthur Johnston) – 8:58
6. "I Get Along Without You Very Well (Except Sometimes)" (Hoagy Carmichael, Jane Brown Thompson) – 7:12
7. "Sweet Georgia Brown" (Ben Bernie, Kenneth Casey, Maceo Pinkard) – 7:51
8. "Falling in Love With Love" (Lorenz Hart, Richard Rodgers) – 6:51
9. "Hogtown Blues" (Oscar Peterson) – 8:03
10. "Emily" (Johnny Mandel, Johnny Mercer) – 6:42
11. "Satin Doll" (Duke Ellington, Mercer, Billy Strayhorn) – 5:23
12. "Duke Ellington Medley: "I Got It Bad (and That Ain't Good)"/"Do Nothing till You Hear from Me"/"C Jam Blues" (Ellington, Paul Francis Webster)/(Ellington, Bob Russell)/(Ellington) – 9:30
13. "Cute" (Neal Hefti) – 8:12

== Personnel ==
=== Performance ===
- Oscar Peterson – piano
- John Heard – double bass
- Louie Bellson – drum kit
