= Tom Garvin =

Irish political scientist and historian (1944–2024)

Thomas Christopher Garvin MRIA (7 July 1943 – 17 October 2024) was an Irish political scientist and historian. He was Professor Emeritus of Politics at University College Dublin. Garvin was an alumnus of the Woodrow Wilson International Center for Scholars in Washington, DC.

== Life and career ==
Garvin was a graduate of UCD with a Bachelor of Arts degree in history and politics and a Master of Arts degree in politics. His Doctor of Philosophy degree was awarded by the University of Georgia in 1974 for his thesis Political Parties in a Dublin Constituency: A Behavioural Analysis. He was a central figure in establishing the Political Studies Association of Ireland in 1982, and his professional reputation saw him win promotion in UCD, where he became Professor of Politics in 1991. In that capacity, he also served as Head of Department until 2005. His academic career was marked by sabbaticals in the USA (where he spent extended periods at the Woodrow Wilson Center, Washington DC; Colgate University; Mount Holyoke College; the University of Georgia; and, as Burns Professor, Boston College). He was elected as a member of the Royal Irish Academy in 2003.

Garvin's academic output included 60 articles in journals, chapters in books, and publications of similar type; six books, with a further two forthcoming; two edited volumes; and a range of publications of other kinds. The best-known of his books formed a sequence dealing with successive themes in the emergence of modern Ireland: "The evolution of Irish nationalist politics" (1981, 1983); "Nationalist revolutionaries in Ireland 1858-1928" (1987); "1922: the birth of Irish democracy" (1996); and "Preventing the future: why was Ireland so poor for so long" (2004).

Garvin retired on 1 September 2008 after working for 41 years in what became the UCD School of Politics and International Relations. He died on 17 October 2024.

== Publications ==
- The Evolution of Irish Nationalist Politics
- Nationalist Revolutionaries in Ireland
- 1922: The Birth of Irish Democracy
- Preventing the Future: Why was Ireland So Poor for So Long?
- Judging Lemass
- News from a New Republic: Ireland in the 1950s
- The Books that Define Ireland (with Bryan Fanning)
- The Lives of Daniel Binchy: Irish Scholar, Diplomat, Public Intellectual
