= Tom Ranier =

American instrumentalist (born 1949)

- Born: Thomas John Ranier; July 13, 1949 (age 77); Chicago, Illinois, U.S.
- Genres: Bop, cool jazz, West Coast jazz, classical, pop
- Occupations: Musician, composer, educator
- Instruments: Piano, saxophone, clarinet, flute

Thomas John Ranier (born July 13, 1949) is an American instrumentalist who primarily plays piano but also saxophone and clarinet. As a jazz artist he has recorded widely under his own name and as a sideman for Warner Bros., Concord Records and several other labels. He has been prominent in the film, television, and music recording industry since the 1970s. He has played keyboards, woodwinds and writing music for a long list of assignments, including Grammy, Academy Award, Emmy, and Golden Globe winning media and soundtracks for artists such as Barbra Streisand, Shirley Bassey, Michael Feinstein, Christina Aguilera, Joe Pass, Plácido Domingo, Barry Manilow, Natalie Cole, and many others. As a pianist and jazz artist, "(his) personal approach mixes aspects of Bud Powell's complexity, Oscar Peterson's ardent swing and Bill Evans' exploratory harmonies."

== Early life, musical education and influences ==
Tom Ranier was born in Chicago on July 13, 1949. His family later moved to Garden Grove, California. He was first musically inspired by clarinetist Benny Goodman at age six or seven, and was also inspired by Charlie Parker. "One of the first records that I really liked was Charlie Parker with Strings, the way he soared over the orchestra..." Ranier took up piano at age ten, studying the classical repertoire, and added clarinet at 12. He has said he did not pursue a concert piano career because, "After hearing Benny, I always wanted to play jazz."

While a student at Santiago High School, Ranier worked with his father (Lou Ranier) on gigs and studied arranging with the noted writer Jack Daugherty. After high school Ranier studied music at California State University, Fullerton where he received a B.A. in Music Composition in 1972; he also studied with Kalman Bloch on clarinet and Lloyd Rogers in composition. He studied piano with Earle Voorhies, Craig Rees, and John Crown. His further studies at were completed at USC and Cal-Arts.

== Professional career ==
Ranier established a reputation primarily on piano as a jazz performer with vibist Dave Pike and saxophonist Pete Christlieb, and co-led a band with drummer Sherman Ferguson and bassist John Heard. Under his own name he first recorded in 1976 for Warner Bros., and in 1980 for the First American label. Recently he has recorded for Concord Records. He has gone on to work with the Terry Gibbs-Buddy DeFranco Sextet, George Coleman, Lew Tabackin, Eddie Daniels, Lanny Morgan and a long list of other jazz musicians.

Live jazz performance and the art of improvising is important to Ranier: "it's a combination of both thinking and feeling...(the) music is complex enough that there is a lot of thought going on...you're trying to project something, listening from deep within you."

Ranier's list of studio work for television, movies, and entertainment is quite extensive, including The Young and the Restless (1986), Noises Off (1992), Matlock, Diagnosis: Murder, Trial and Error (1997), Letters from a Killer (1998), and Sideways (2004). Most recently, he is seen and heard on the TV show Dancing with the Stars. Ranier has done extensive work as both a musician and orchestrator for Disney, the Academy Awards, and CBS. Ranier takes great pride in and enjoys doing studio work: "it's a craft that both keeps you fresh and makes you a better musician...and because you work on different projects with different composers, it broadens your scope."

Though Ranier is more widely known as a pianist and piano/keyboard/synth specialist in live and studio music, he is also very adept as a musician and jazz improviser on the clarinet and saxophone. He has recorded on numerous albums and studio sessions as a woodwind doubler.

== Teaching and education career ==
Tom Ranier is a strong advocate of music education and has been teaching at the collegiate level since the mid-1970s. He has taught jazz composition and arranging at Fullerton College and helped to contribute writing for several highly successful recordings the school produced. Most recently he has been teaching in the jazz program headed up by guitarist Kenny Burrell at the University of California, Los Angeles.

He is also an educational author for Alfred Publishing and wrote Piano in the Rhythm Section.

== Discography ==
=== Studio albums ===
- 1975: Ranier (Warner Bros.)
- 1980: Night Music (Music in Motion)
- 1997: In the Still of the Night (Contemporary)
- 2020: This Way (Tom Ranier)

=== Collaboration albums ===
- 1982: A Chick From Chelsea - Jimmy Mosher Quartet Featuring Tom Ranier, Joel DiBartolo And Peter Donald (Discovery records)
- 1983: Heard Ranier Ferguson (ITI)
- 1987: Back to Back - Heard Ranier Ferguson (ITI)
- 2000: Late Nite Jazz - Pete Christlieb, Jim Hughart, Tom Ranier, Charles Harris, Slyde Hyde (Vertical Jazzz)
- 2016: Chanté with Leo Potts (CD Baby)

== Bibliography ==
- Feather, Leonard; Gitler, Ira (2007) The Biographical Encyclopedia of Jazz. Oxford University Press, USA. ISBN 0-19-507418-1
