= Lester Leaps In =

Single by Count Basie's Kansas City Seven
- Released: 1939
- Recorded: September 5, 1939, New York City, NY
- Genre: Jazz
- Length: 3:12
- Label: Vocalion; 5118
- Songwriter: Lester Young

"Lester Leaps In" is a jazz standard originally recorded by Count Basie's Kansas City Seven in 1939. The composition, credited to the group's tenor saxophone player Lester Young, is a contrafact based on the chord progression of "I Got Rhythm", and serves as a vehicle for interweaving solos by Young and Basie.

Eddie Jefferson, pioneer of vocalese, wrote lyrics for the composition, calling his version "I Got the Blues".

== Critical acclaim ==
- "Lester Leaps In" is listed among the Milestone Recordings in American Music at the Three Perfect Minutes site.
- jazz.com gives "Lester Leaps In" a 98, on a scale of 100 – "Classic performance. A 'must have' for jazz fans."

== Personnel (original 1939 recording) ==
- Count Basie - piano
- Lester Young - tenor saxophone
- Buck Clayton - trumpet
- Dicky Wells - trombone
- Freddie Green - guitar
- Walter Page - bass
- Jo Jones - drums

== Other recordings ==
In 1958 Gil Evans recorded it with his orchestra for his New Bottle Old Wine album.

In 1960 Harry James released a version on his album Harry James...Today (MGM E-3848).

Charlie Watts Orchestra included it in their 1986 'Live at Fulham Town Hall' album.
