= Count Basie =

American jazz musician and composer (1904–1984)

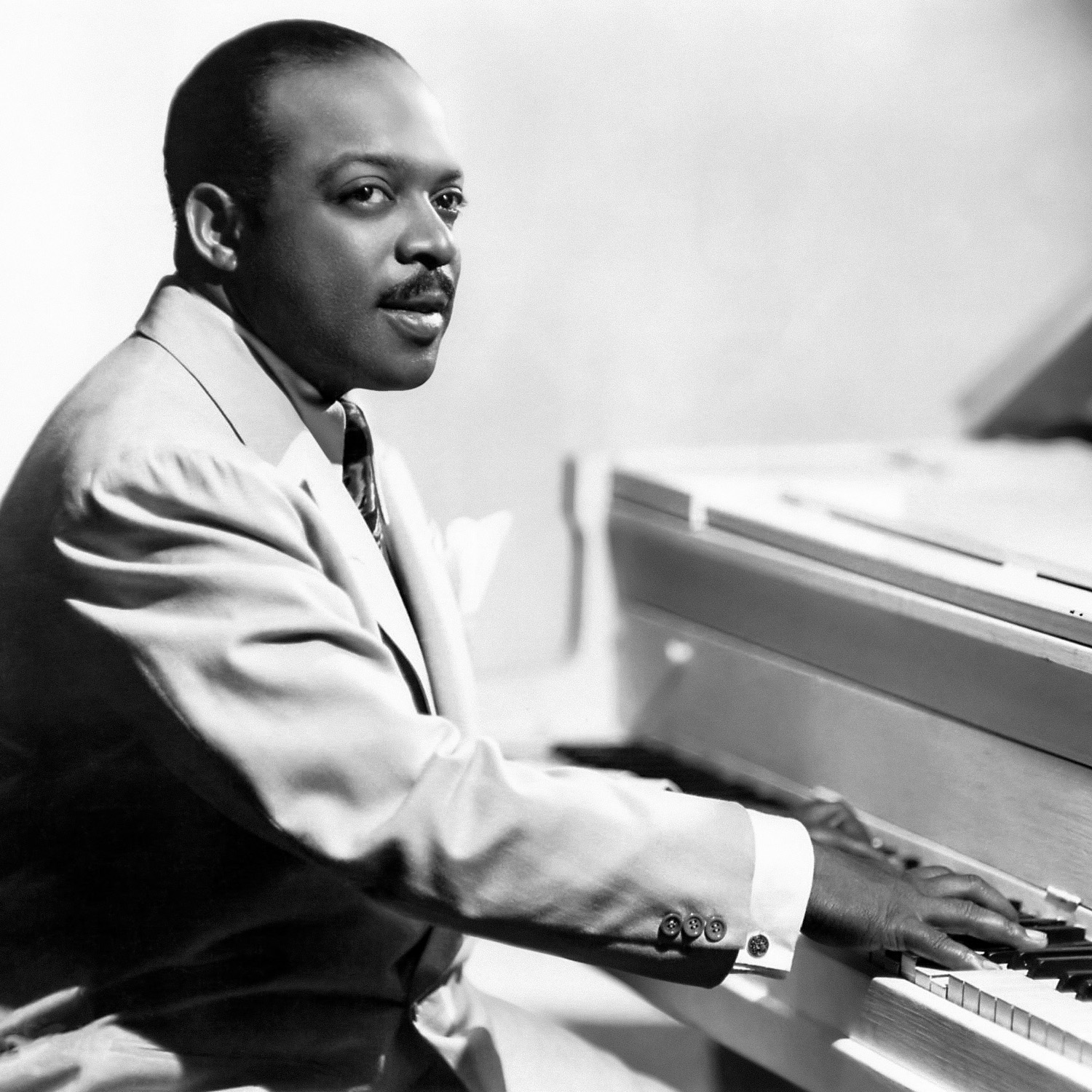
- Basie c. 1955

Background information
- Born: William James Basie; August 21, 1904; Red Bank, New Jersey, U.S.
- Died: April 26, 1984 (aged 79) Hollywood, Florida, U.S.
- Genres: Jazz; Kansas City jazz; swing; big band; piano blues; crime jazz
- Occupations: Musician; bandleader; composer
- Instruments: Piano; organ
- Years active: 1924–1984
- Website: countbasie.net

William James "Count" Basie (/ˈbeɪsi/; August 21, 1904 – April 26, 1984) was an American jazz pianist, organist, bandleader, and composer. In 1935, he formed the Count Basie Orchestra, and in 1936 took them to Chicago for a long engagement and their first recording. He led the group for almost 50 years, creating innovations like the use of two "split" tenor saxophones, emphasizing the rhythm section, riffing with a big band, using arrangers to broaden their sound, his minimalist piano style, and others.

Many musicians came to prominence under his direction, including the tenor saxophonists Lester Young and Herschel Evans, the guitarist Freddie Green, trumpeters Buck Clayton and Harry "Sweets" Edison, plunger trombonist Al Grey, and singers Jimmy Rushing, Helen Humes, Dennis Rowland, Thelma Carpenter, and Joe Williams.

As a composer, Basie is known for writing such jazz standards as "Blue and Sentimental", "Jumpin' at the Woodside" and "One O'Clock Jump".

== Biography ==
=== Early life and education ===
William Basie was born on August 21, 1904, in Red Bank, New Jersey, to Lillian (née Childs) and Harvey Lee Basie. His father worked as a coachman and caregiver for a wealthy judge. After automobiles replaced horses, his father became a groundskeeper and handyman for several wealthy families in the area. Both of his parents had some type of musical background. His father played the mellophone, and his mother played the piano; in fact, she gave Basie his first piano lessons. She took in laundry and baked cakes for sale for a living. She paid 25 cents a lesson for Count Basie's piano instruction.

Not the best student in school, Basie dreamed of a traveling life, inspired by touring carnivals which came to town. He finished junior high school, but spent much of his time at the Palace Theater in Red Bank, where doing occasional chores gained him free admission to performances. He quickly learned to improvise music appropriate to the acts and the silent movies.

Though a natural at the piano, Basie preferred drums. Discouraged by the obvious talents of Sonny Greer, who also lived in Red Bank and became Duke Ellington's drummer in 1919, Basie switched to piano exclusively at age 15. Greer and Basie played together in venues until Greer set out on his professional career. By then, Basie was playing with pickup groups for dances, resorts, and amateur shows, including Harry Richardson's "Kings of Syncopation". When not playing a gig, he hung out at the local pool hall with other musicians, where he picked up on upcoming play dates and gossip. He got some jobs in Asbury Park at the Jersey Shore, and played at the Hong Kong Inn until a better player took his place.

=== Early career ===
Around 1920, Basie went to Harlem, a hotbed of jazz, where he lived down the block from the Alhambra Theater. Early after his arrival, he bumped into Sonny Greer, who was by then the drummer for the Washingtonians, Duke Ellington's early band. Soon, Basie met many of the Harlem musicians who were "making the scene", including Willie "the Lion" Smith and James P. Johnson. One of his earliest gigs in Harlem was working in the band at Broadway Jones's nightclub; a job he was given by banjo player Elmer Snowden who had temporarily taken over leadership of the group while Jones was performing elsewhere.

Before he was 20 years old, he toured extensively on the Keith and TOBA vaudeville circuits as a solo pianist, accompanist, and music director for blues singers, dancers, and comedians. This provided an early training that was to prove significant in his later career.

Back in Harlem in 1925, Basie gained his first steady job at Leroy's, a place known for its piano players and its "cutting contests". The place catered to "uptown celebrities", and typically the band winged every number without sheet music using "head arrangements". He met Fats Waller, who was playing organ at the Lincoln Theater accompanying silent movies, and Waller taught him how to play that instrument. (Basie later played organ at the Eblon Theater in Kansas City). As he did with Duke Ellington, Willie "the Lion" Smith helped Basie out during the lean times by arranging gigs at "house-rent parties", introducing him to other leading musicians, and teaching him some piano technique.

Basie toured in several acts between 1925 and 1927, including Katie Krippen and Her Kiddies (featuring singer Katie Crippen) as part of the Hippity Hop show; on the Keith, the Columbia Burlesque, and the Theater Owners Booking Association (T.O.B.A.) vaudeville circuits; and as a soloist and accompanist to blues singer Gonzelle White as well as Crippen. His touring took him to Kansas City, St. Louis, New Orleans, and Chicago. Throughout his tours, Basie met many jazz musicians, including Louis Armstrong. In 1928, Basie was in Tulsa and heard Walter Page and his Famous Blue Devils, one of the first big bands, which featured Jimmy Rushing on vocals. A few months later, he was invited to join the band, which played mostly in Texas and Oklahoma. It was at this time that he began to be known as "Count" Basie (see Jazz royalty).

=== Kansas City years ===
The following year, in 1929, Basie became the pianist with the Bennie Moten band based in Kansas City, inspired by Moten's ambition to raise his band to match the level of those led by Duke Ellington or Fletcher Henderson. Where the Blue Devils were "snappier" and more "bluesy", the Moten band was more refined and respected, playing in the "Kansas City stomp" style. In addition to playing piano, Basie was co-arranger with Eddie Durham, who notated the music. Their "Moten Swing", which Basie claimed credit for, was an invaluable contribution to the development of swing music, and at one performance at the Pearl Theatre in Philadelphia in December 1932, the theatre opened its door to allow anybody in who wanted to hear the band perform. During a stay in Chicago, Basie recorded with the band. He occasionally played four-hand piano and dual pianos with Moten, who also conducted. The band improved with several personnel changes, including the addition of tenor saxophonist Ben Webster.

When the band voted Moten out, Basie took over for several months, calling the group Count Basie and his Cherry Blossoms. When his own band folded, he rejoined Moten with a newly re-organized band. A year later, Basie joined Bennie Moten's band, and played with them until Moten died in 1935 from a failed tonsillectomy. The band tried to stay together but failed. Basie then formed his own nine-piece band, Barons of Rhythm, with many former Moten members including Walter Page (bass), Jo Jones (drums), Lester Young (tenor saxophone) and Jimmy Rushing (vocals).

Basie's new band played at the Reno Club and sometimes were broadcast on local radio. Late one night with time to fill, the band started improvising. Basie liked the results and named the piece "One O'Clock Jump". According to Basie, "we hit it with the rhythm section and went into the riffs, and the riffs just stuck. We set the thing up front in D-flat, and then we just went on playing in F." It became his signature tune.

=== John Hammond and first recordings ===
At the end of 1936, Basie and his band, now billed as Count Basie and His Barons of Rhythm, moved from Kansas City to Chicago, where they honed their repertoire at a long engagement at the Grand Terrace Cafe. Right from the start, Basie's band was known for its rhythm section. Another Basie innovation was the use of two tenor saxophone players; at the time, most bands had just one. When Young complained of Herschel Evans' vibrato, Basie placed them on either side of the alto players, and soon had the tenor players engaged in "duels". Many other bands later adapted the split tenor arrangement.

In that city in October 1936, the band had a recording session which the producer John Hammond later described as "the only perfect, completely perfect recording session I've ever had anything to do with". Hammond first heard Basie's band on the radio and went to Kansas City to check them out. He invited them to record, in performances which were Lester Young's earliest recordings. Those four sides were released on Vocalion Records under the band name of Jones-Smith Incorporated; the sides were "Shoe Shine Boy", "Evening", "Boogie Woogie", and "Oh Lady Be Good". After Vocalion became a subsidiary of Columbia Records in 1938, "Boogie Woogie" was released in 1941 as part of a four-record compilation album entitled Boogie Woogie (Columbia album C44). When he made the Vocalion recordings, Basie had already signed with Decca Records, but did not have his first recording session with them until January 1937.

By then, Basie's sound was characterized by a "jumping" beat and the contrapuntal accents of his own piano. His personnel around 1937 included: Lester Young and Herschel Evans (tenor sax), Freddie Green (guitar), Jo Jones (drums), Walter Page (bass), Earle Warren (alto sax), Buck Clayton and Harry Edison (trumpet), Benny Morton and Dickie Wells (trombone). Lester Young, known as "Prez" by the band, came up with nicknames for all the other band members. He called Basie "Holy Man", "Holy Main", and just plain "Holy".

Basie favored blues, and he would showcase some of the most notable blues singers of the era after he went to New York: Billie Holiday, Jimmy Rushing, Big Joe Turner, Helen Humes, and Joe Williams. He also hired arrangers who knew how to maximize the band's abilities, such as Eddie Durham and Jimmy Mundy.

=== New York City and the swing years ===
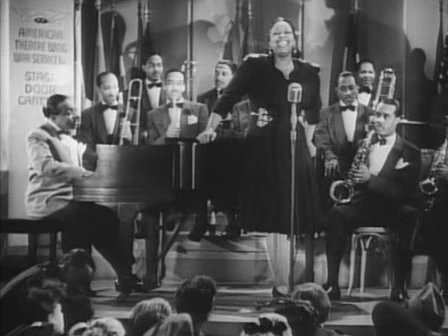
Basie and band, with vocalist Ethel Waters, from the film Stage Door Canteen (1943)

When Basie took his orchestra to New York in 1937, they made the Woodside Hotel in Harlem their base (they often rehearsed in its basement). Soon, they were booked at the Roseland Ballroom for the Christmas show. Basie recalled a review, which said something like, "We caught the great Count Basie band which is supposed to be so hot he was going to come in here and set the Roseland on fire. Well, the Roseland is still standing". Compared to the reigning band of Fletcher Henderson, Basie's band lacked polish and presentation.

The producer John Hammond continued to advise and encourage the band, and they soon came up with some adjustments, including softer playing, more solos, and more standards. They paced themselves to save their hottest numbers for later in the show, to give the audience a chance to warm up. His first official recordings for Decca followed, under contract to agent MCA, including "Pennies from Heaven" and "Honeysuckle Rose".

Hammond introduced Basie to Billie Holiday, whom he invited to sing with the band. (Holiday did not record with Basie, as she had her own record contract and preferred working with small combos). The band's first appearance at the Apollo Theater followed, with the vocalists Holiday and Jimmy Rushing getting the most attention. Durham returned to help with arranging and composing, but for the most part, the orchestra worked out its numbers in rehearsal, with Basie guiding the proceedings. There were often no musical notations made. Once the musicians found what they liked, they usually were able to repeat it using their "head arrangements" and collective memory.

Next, Basie played at the Savoy, which was noted more for lindy-hopping, while the Roseland was a place for fox-trots and congas. In early 1938, the Savoy was the meeting ground for a "battle of the bands" with Chick Webb's group. Basie had Holiday, and Webb countered with the singer Ella Fitzgerald. As Metronome magazine proclaimed, "Basie's Brilliant Band Conquers Chick's"; the article described the evening:

Throughout the fight, which never let down in its intensity during the whole fray, Chick took the aggressive, with the Count playing along easily and, on the whole, more musically scientifically. Undismayed by Chick's forceful drum beating, which sent the audience into shouts of encouragement and appreciation and casual beads of perspiration to drop from Chick's brow onto the brass cymbals, the Count maintained an attitude of poise and self-assurance. He constantly parried Chick's thundering haymakers with tantalizing runs and arpeggios which teased more and more force from his adversary.

The publicity over the big band battle, before and after, gave the Basie band a boost and wider recognition. Soon after, Benny Goodman recorded their signature "One O'Clock Jump" with his band.

A few months later, Holiday left for Artie Shaw's band. Hammond introduced Helen Humes, whom Basie hired; she stayed with Basie for four years. When Eddie Durham left for Glenn Miller's orchestra, he was replaced by Dicky Wells. Basie's 14-man band began playing at the Famous Door, a mid-town nightspot with a CBS network feed and air conditioning, which Hammond was said to have bought the club in return for their booking Basie steadily throughout the summer of 1938. Their fame took a huge leap. Adding to their play book, Basie received arrangements from Jimmy Mundy (who had also worked with Benny Goodman and Earl Hines), particularly for "Cherokee", "Easy Does It", and "Super Chief". In 1939, Basie and his band made a major cross-country tour, including their first West Coast dates. A few months later, Basie quit MCA and signed with the William Morris Agency, who got them better fees.

On February 19, 1940, Count Basie and his Orchestra opened a four-week engagement at Southland in Boston, and they broadcast over the radio on February 20. On the West Coast, in 1942 the band did a spot in Reveille With Beverly, a musical film starring Ann Miller, and a "Command Performance" for Armed Forces Radio, with Hollywood stars Clark Gable, Bette Davis, Carmen Miranda, Jerry Colonna, and the singer Dinah Shore. Other minor movie spots followed, including Choo Choo Swing, Crazy House, Top Man, Stage Door Canteen, and Hit Parade of 1943. They also continued to record for OKeh Records and Columbia Records. The war years caused a lot of members turn over, and the band worked many play dates with lower pay. Dance hall bookings were down sharply as swing began to fade, the effects of the musicians' strikes of 1942–44 and 1948 began to be felt, and the public's taste grew for singers.

Basie occasionally lost some key soloists. However, throughout the 1940s, he maintained a big band that possessed an infectious rhythmic beat, an enthusiastic team spirit, and a long list of inspired and talented jazz soloists.

=== Los Angeles and the Cavalcade of Jazz concerts ===
Count Basie was the featured artist at the first Cavalcade of Jazz concert held at Wrigley Field on September 23, 1945, which was produced by Leon Hefflin Sr. Al Jarvis was the Emcee and other artists to appear on stage were Joe Liggins and his Honeydrippers, The Peters Sisters, Slim and Bam, Valaida Snow, and Big Joe Turner. They played to a crowd of 15,000. Count Basie and his Orchestra played at the tenth Cavalcade of Jazz concert also at Wrigley Field on June 20, 1954. He played along with The Flairs, Christine Kittrell, Lamp Lighters, Louis Jordan and His Tympany Five, Ruth Brown, and Perez Prado and his Orchestra.

=== Post-war and later years ===
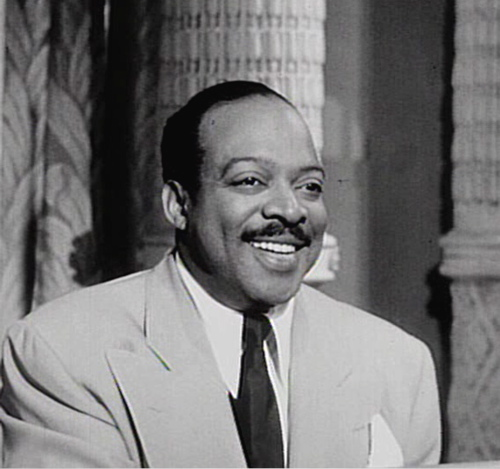
Basie in Rhythm and Blues Revue (1955)

The big band era appeared to have ended after the war, and Basie disbanded the group. For a while, he performed in combos, sometimes stretched to an orchestra. In 1950, he headlined the Universal-International short film "Sugar Chile" Robinson, Billie Holiday, Count Basie and His Sextet. He reformed his group as a 16-piece orchestra in 1952. This group was eventually called the New Testament band. Basie credited Billy Eckstine, a top male vocalist of the time, for prompting his return to Big Band. He said that Norman Granz got them into the Birdland club and promoted the new band through recordings on the Mercury, Clef, and Verve labels. By 1956, Basie's recordings were also showcased by Ben Selvin within the RCA Thesaurus transcription library. The jukebox era had begun, and Basie shared the exposure along with early rock'n'roll and rhythm and blues artists. Basie's new band was more of an ensemble group, with fewer solo turns, and relying less on "head" and more on written arrangements.

Basie added touches of bebop "so long as it made sense", and he required that "it all had to have feeling". Basie's band was sharing Birdland with such bebop musicians as Charlie Parker, Dizzy Gillespie, and Miles Davis. Behind the occasional bebop solos, he always kept his strict rhythmic pulse, "so it doesn't matter what they do up front; the audience gets the beat". Basie also added flute to some numbers, a novelty at the time that became widely copied. Soon, his band was touring and recording again. The new band included: Paul Campbell, Tommy Turrentine, Johnny Letman, Idrees Sulieman, and Joe Newman (trumpet); Jimmy Wilkins, Benny Powell, Matthew Gee (trombone); Paul Quinichette and Floyd "Candy" Johnson (tenor sax); Frank Wess (tenor sax and flute); Marshal Royal and Ernie Wilkins (alto sax); and Charlie Fowlkes (baritone sax). DownBeat magazine reported: "(Basie) has managed to assemble an ensemble that can thrill both the listener who remembers 1938 and the youngster who has never before heard a big band like this." In 1957, Basie sued the jazz venue Ball and Chain in Miami over outstanding fees, causing the closure of the venue.

In 1958, the band made its first European tour. Jazz was especially appreciated in France, The Netherlands, and Germany in the 1950s; these countries were the stomping grounds for many expatriate American jazz stars who were either resurrecting their careers or sitting out the years of racial divide in the United States. Neal Hefti began to provide arrangements, including "Li'l Darlin'". By the mid-1950s, Basie's band had become one of the preeminent backing big bands for some of the most prominent jazz vocalists of the time. They also toured with the "Birdland Stars of 1955", whose lineup included Sarah Vaughan, Erroll Garner, Lester Young, George Shearing, and Stan Getz.

In 1957, Basie released the live album Count Basie at Newport. "April in Paris" (arrangement by Wild Bill Davis) was a best-selling instrumental and the title song for the hit album. The Basie band made two tours in the British Isles and on the second, they put on a command performance for Queen Elizabeth II, along with Judy Garland, Vera Lynn, and Mario Lanza. He was a guest on ABC's The Pat Boone Chevy Showroom, a venue also opened to several other black entertainers. In 1959, Basie's band recorded a "greatest hits" double album The Count Basie Story (Frank Foster, arranger), and Basie/Eckstine Incorporated, an album featuring Billy Eckstine, Quincy Jones (as arranger) and the Count Basie Orchestra. It was released by Roulette Records, then later reissued by Capitol Records.

Later that year, Basie appeared on a television special with Fred Astaire, featuring a dance solo to "Sweet Georgia Brown", followed in January 1961 by Basie performing at one of the five John F. Kennedy Inaugural Balls. That summer, Basie and Duke Ellington combined forces for the recording First Time! The Count Meets the Duke, each providing four numbers from their play books.

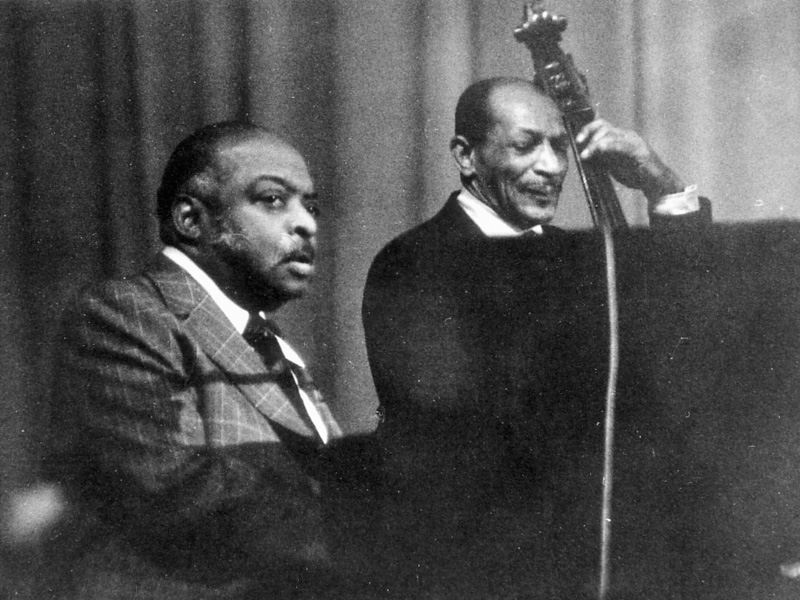
Count Basie (left) in concert (Cologne 1975)

During the balance of the 1960s, the band kept active with tours, recordings, television appearances, festivals, Las Vegas shows, and travel abroad, including cruises. Some time around 1964, Basie adopted his trademark yachting cap.

Through steady changes in personnel, Basie led the band into the 1980s. Basie made a few more movie appearances, such as in the Jerry Lewis film Cinderfella (1960) and the Mel Brooks movie Blazing Saddles (1974), playing a revised arrangement of "April in Paris". In 1982 Basie and his orchestra were the featured entertainment for the 50th Anniversary celebrations of the Pittsburgh Steelers at the David L. Lawrence Convention Center.

Basie was a Prince Hall Freemason as a member of Wisdom Lodge No. 102 in Chicago as well as a Shriner.

== Marriage, family and death ==
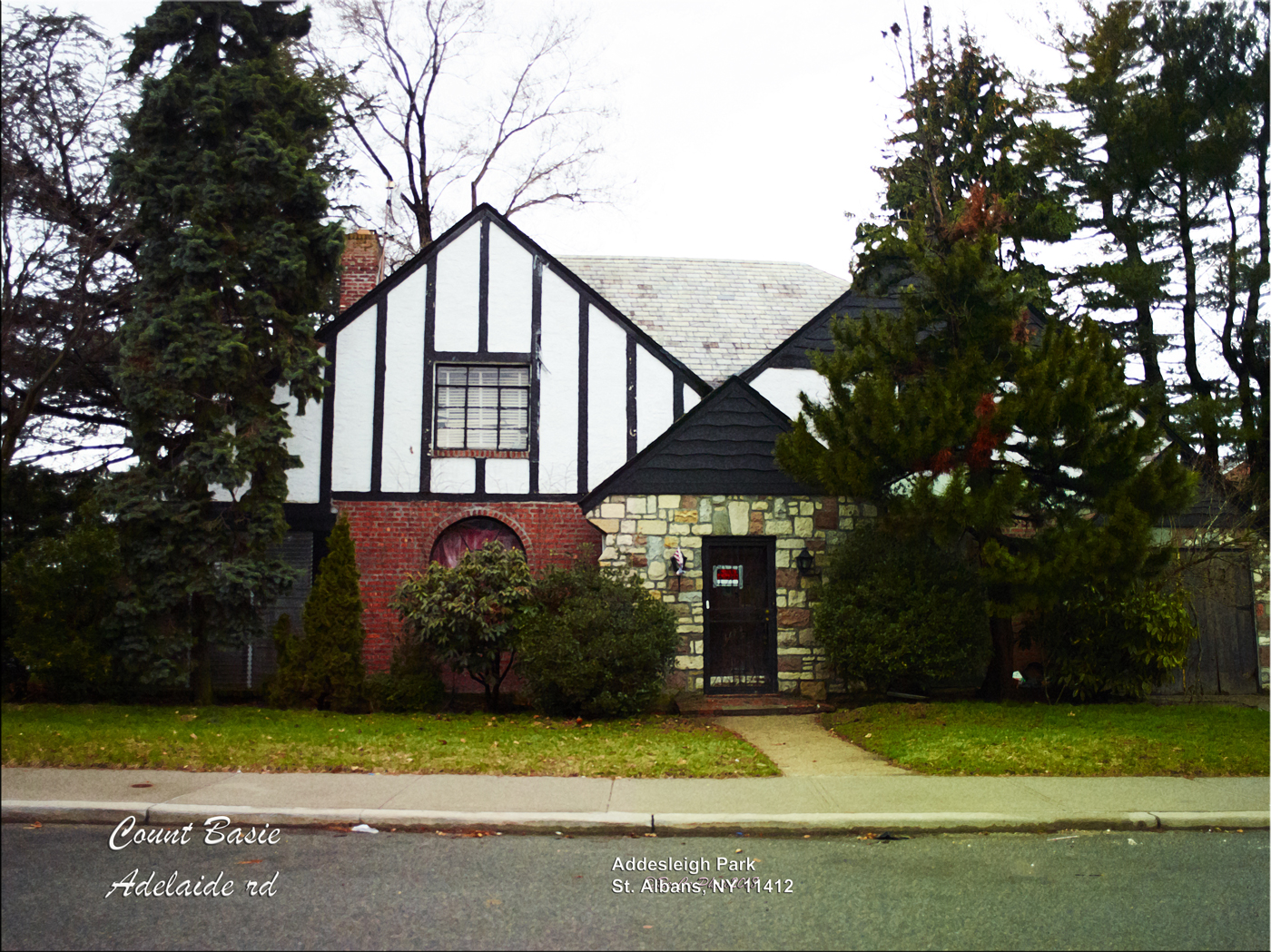
Count Basie home in Addisleigh Pk, Adelaide Rd.

Basie was a member of Omega Psi Phi fraternity. On July 21, 1930, Basie married Vivian Lee Winn, in Kansas City, Missouri. They were divorced sometime before 1935. Some time in or before 1935, the now single Basie returned to New York City, renting a house at 111 West 138th Street, Manhattan, as evidenced by the 1940 census. He married Catherine Morgan on July 13, 1940, in the King County courthouse in Seattle, Washington. In 1942, they moved to Queens. Their only child, Diane, was born February 6, 1944 with cerebral palsy. The Basies bought a home in the new whites-only neighborhood of Addisleigh Park in 1946 on Adelaide Road and 175th Street, St. Albans, Queens. They moved to Freeport in the Bahamas in the 1970s. His wife Catherine Basie died of heart disease at the couple's home in Freeport in 1983. She was 69 years old.

A year later, on April 26, 1984, 79-year-old Count Basie died of pancreatic cancer at Doctors' Hospital in Hollywood, Florida. His funeral, at the Abyssinian Baptist Church in Harlem, drew over two thousand mourners inside as crowds gathered outside along 138th Street. The service featured musical tributes—including Joe Williams singing Duke Ellington's "Come Sunday"—and was attended by Dizzy Gillespie, Quincy Jones, Cab Calloway, Sarah Vaughan, Billy Taylor, and longtime rhythm guitarist Freddie Green, among others. Basie was buried alongside his wife, Catherine, at Pinelawn Memorial Park in Farmingdale, New York.

== Singers ==
Basie hitched his star to some of the most famous vocalists of the 1950s and 1960s, which helped keep the Big Band sound alive and added greatly to his recording catalog. Jimmy Rushing sang with Basie in the late 1930s. Joe Williams toured with the band and was featured on the 1957 album One O'Clock Jump, and 1956's Count Basie Swings, Joe Williams Sings, with "Every Day (I Have the Blues)" becoming a huge hit. With Billy Eckstine on the album Basie/Eckstine Incorporated, in 1959. Ella Fitzgerald made some memorable recordings with Basie, including the 1963 album Ella and Basie!. With the New Testament Basie band in full swing, and arrangements written by a youthful Quincy Jones, this album proved a swinging respite from her Songbook recordings and constant touring she did during this period. She even toured with the Basie Orchestra in the mid-1970s, and Fitzgerald and Basie also met on the 1979 albums A Classy Pair, Digital III at Montreux, and A Perfect Match, the last two also recorded live at Montreux. In addition to Quincy Jones, Basie was using arrangers such as Benny Carter (Kansas City Suite), Neal Hefti (The Atomic Mr Basie), and Sammy Nestico (Basie-Straight Ahead).

Frank Sinatra recorded for the first time with Basie on 1962's Sinatra-Basie and for a second studio album on 1964's It Might as Well Be Swing, which was arranged by Quincy Jones. Jones also arranged and conducted 1966's live Sinatra at the Sands which featured Sinatra with Count Basie and his orchestra stayed at the Sands Hotel in Las Vegas at Sinatra's request. In May 1970, Sinatra performed in London's Royal Festival Hall with the Basie orchestra, in a charity benefit for the National Society for the Prevention of Cruelty to Children. Sinatra later said of this concert "I have a funny feeling that those two nights could have been my finest hour, really. It went so well; it was so thrilling and exciting".

Basie also recorded with Tony Bennett in the late 1950s. Their albums together included In Person and Strike Up the Band. Basie also toured with Bennett, including a date at Carnegie Hall. He also recorded with Sammy Davis Jr., Bing Crosby, and Sarah Vaughan. One of Basie's biggest regrets was never recording with Louis Armstrong, though they shared the same bill several times. In 1968, Basie and his Band recorded an album with Jackie Wilson titled Manufacturers of Soul.

== Legacy and honors ==
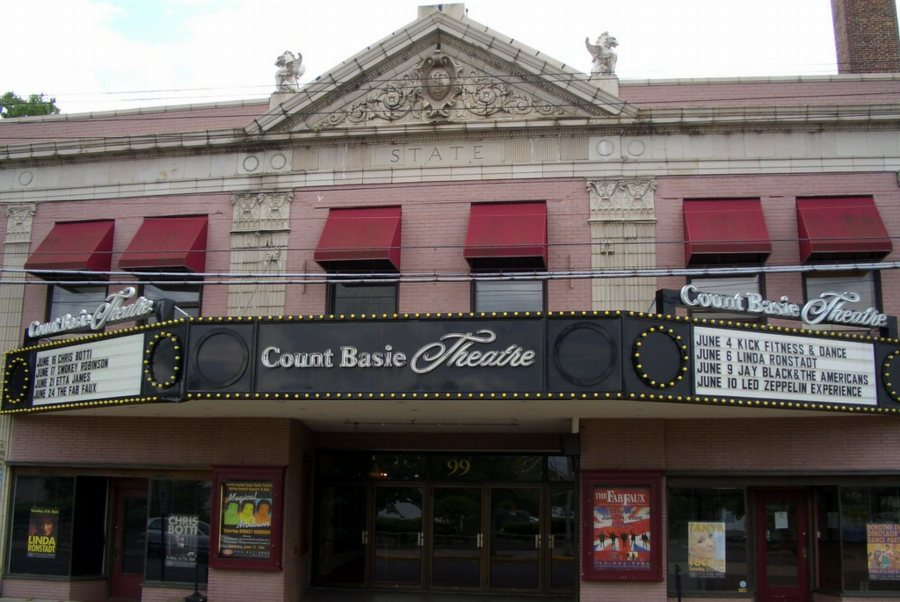
Count Basie Theatre in Red Bank, New Jersey

Count Basie introduced several generations of listeners to the Big Band sound and left an influential catalog. Basie is remembered by many who worked for him as being considerate of musicians and their opinions, modest, relaxed, fun-loving, dryly witty, and always enthusiastic about his music. In his autobiography, he wrote, "I think the band can really swing when it swings easy, when it can just play along like you are cutting butter."

- In Red Bank, New Jersey, the Count Basie Center for the Arts, a property on Monmouth Street redeveloped for live performances, and Count Basie Field were named in his honor.
- Received an honorary doctorate from Berklee College of Music in 1974.
- Mechanic Street, where he grew up with his family, has the honorary title of Count Basie Way.
- In 2009, Edgecombe Avenue and 160th Street in Washington Heights, Manhattan, were renamed as Paul Robeson Boulevard and Count Basie Place. The corner is the location of 555 Edgecombe Avenue, also known as the Paul Robeson Home, a National Historic Landmark where Count Basie had also lived.
- In 2010, Basie was inducted into the New Jersey Hall of Fame.
- In October 2013, version 3.7 of WordPress was code-named Count Basie.
- In 2019, Basie was inducted into the Blues Hall of Fame.
- Asteroid 35394 Countbasie, discovered by astronomers at Caussols in 1997, was named after him. The official naming citation was published by the Minor Planet Center on November 8, 2019 (M.P.C. 118220).
- 6508 Hollywood Boulevard in Hollywood, California is the location of Count Basie's star on the Hollywood Walk of Fame.

== Representation in other media ==
- Jerry Lewis used "Blues in Hoss' Flat" from Basie's Chairman of the Board album, as the basis for his own "Chairman of the Board" routine in the movie The Errand Boy (1961).
- "Blues in Hoss' Flat," composed by Basie band member Frank Foster, was used by the radio DJ Al "Jazzbeaux" Collins as his theme song in San Francisco and New York.
- Since 1963 "The Kid From Red Bank" has been the theme and signature music for the most popular Norwegian radio show, Reiseradioen, aired at NRK P1 every day during the summer.
- In Home Alone 2: Lost in New York (1992), Brenda Fricker's "Pigeon Lady" character claims to have heard Basie in Carnegie Hall.
- Drummer Neil Peart of the Canadian rock band Rush recorded a version of "One O'Clock Jump" with the Buddy Rich Big Band, and has used it at the end of his drum solos on the 2002 Vapor Trails Tour and Rush's 30th Anniversary Tour.
- In the 2016 movie The Matchbreaker, Emily Atkins (Christina Grimmie) recounts the story of how Count Basie met his wife three times without speaking to her, telling her he would marry her some day in their first conversation, and then marrying her seven years later.
- The post-hardcore band Dance Gavin Dance have a song titled "Count Bassy" that is included on their 2018 album Artificial Selection.
- In his novel This Storm (2019), James Ellroy makes Basie a character who is blackmailed by corrupt Los Angeles police to play a New Year's Eve concert in exchange for ignoring a marijuana charge.

== Discography ==
Count Basie made most of his albums with his big band. See the Count Basie Orchestra Discography.

From 1929 to 1932, Basie was part of Bennie Moten's Kansas City Orchestra.

- Count Basie in Kansas City: Bennie Moten's Great Band of 1930-1932 (RCA Victor, 1965)
- Basie Beginnings: Bennie Moten's Kansas City Orchestra (1929–1932) (Bluebird/RCA, 1989)
- The Swinging Count!, (Clef, 1952)
- Count Basie Presents Eddie Davis Trio + Joe Newman (Roulette, 1958)
- The Atomic Mr. Basie (Roulette, 1958)
- Memories Ad-Lib with Joe Williams (Roulette, 1958)
- Basie/Eckstine Incorporated with Billy Eckstine ( Roulette 1959)
- String Along with Basie (Roulette, 1960)
- Count Basie and the Kansas City 7 (Impulse!, 1962)
- Basie Swingin' Voices Singin' with the Alan Copeland Singers (ABC-Paramount, 1966)
- Basie Meets Bond (United Artists, 1966)
- Basie's Beatle Bag (Verve, 1966)
- Basie on the Beatles (Happy Tiger, 1970)
- Loose Walk with Roy Eldridge (Pablo, 1972)
- Basie Jam (Pablo, 1973)
- The Bosses with Big Joe Turner (1973)
- For the First Time (Pablo, 1974)
- Satch and Josh with Oscar Peterson (Pablo, 1974)
- Basie & Zoot with Zoot Sims (Pablo, 1975)
- Count Basie Jam Session at the Montreux Jazz Festival 1975 (Pablo, 1975)
- For the Second Time (Pablo, 1975)
- Basie Jam 2 (Pablo, 1976)
- Basie Jam 3 (Pablo, 1976)
- Kansas City 5 (Pablo, 1977)
- The Gifted Ones with Dizzy Gillespie (Pablo, 1977)
- Montreux '77 (Pablo, 1977)
- Basie Jam: Montreux '77 (Pablo, 1977)
- Satch and Josh...Again with Oscar Peterson (Pablo, 1977)
- Night Rider with Oscar Peterson (Pablo, 1978)
- Count Basie Meets Oscar Peterson – The Timekeepers (Pablo, 1978)
- Yessir, That's My Baby with Oscar Peterson (Pablo, 1978)
- Kansas City 8: Get Together (Pablo, 1979)
- Kansas City 7 (Pablo, 1980)
- On the Road (Pablo, 1980)
- Kansas City 6 (Pablo, 1981)
- Mostly Blues...and Some Others (Pablo, 1983)
- 88 Basie Street (Pablo, 1983)

=== As sideman ===
With Eddie Lockjaw Davis

- Count Basie Presents Eddie Davis Trio + Joe Newman (Roulette, 1957)

With Harry Edison

- Edison's Lights (Pablo, 1976)

With Benny Goodman

- The Famous 1938 Carnegie Hall Jazz Concert (Columbia, 1939)
- Solo Flight: The Genius of Charlie Christian (Columbia, 1939)

With Jo Jones

- Jo Jones Special (Vanguard, 1955)

With Joe Newman

- Joe Newman and the Boys in the Band (Storyville, 1954)

With Paul Quinichette

- The Vice Pres (Verve, 1952)

With Lester Young

- The Complete Savoy Recordings (Savoy, 1944)

== Filmography ==
- Policy Man (1938)
- Hit Parade of 1943 (1943) – as himself
- Top Man (1943) – as himself
- Sugar Chile Robinson, Billie Holiday, Count Basie and His Sextet (1950) – as himself
- Jamboree (1957)
- Cinderfella (1960) – as himself
- Sex and the Single Girl (1964) – as himself with his orchestra
- Blazing Saddles (1974) – as himself with his orchestra
- Last of the Blue Devils (1979) – interview and concert by the orchestra in documentary on Kansas City music

== Awards ==
=== Grammy Awards ===
In 1958, Basie became the first African-American to win a Grammy Award.

Count Basie Grammy Award history
Year	Category	Title	Genre	Results
1984	Best Jazz Instrumental Performance, Big Band	88 Basie Street	Jazz	Winner
1982	Best Jazz Instrumental Performance, Big Band	Warm Breeze	Jazz	Winner
1980	Best Jazz Instrumental Performance, Big Band	On The Road	Jazz	Winner
1977	Best Jazz Performance by a Big Band	Prime Time	Jazz	Winner
1976	Best Jazz Performance by a Soloist (Instrumental)	Basie And Zoot	Jazz	Winner
1963	Best Performance by an Orchestra – For Dancing	This Time By Basie! Hits of the 50's And 60's	Pop	Winner
1960	Best Performance by a Band For Dancing	Dance With Basie	Pop	Winner
1958	Best Performance by a Dance Band	Basie (The Atomic Mr. Basie)	Pop	Winner
1958	Best Jazz Performance, Group	Basie (The Atomic Mr. Basie)	Jazz	Winner

=== Grammy Hall of Fame ===
By 2011, four recordings of Count Basie had been inducted into the Grammy Hall of Fame, a special Grammy award established in 1973 to honor recordings that are at least 25 years old, and that have "qualitative or historical significance."

Count Basie Grammy Hall of Fame Awards
Year recorded	Title	genre	Label	Year inducted
1939	Lester Leaps In	Jazz (Single)	Vocalion	2005
1955	Everyday (I Have the Blues)	Jazz (Single)	Clef	1992
1955	April in Paris	Jazz (Single)	Clef	1985
1937	One O'Clock Jump	Jazz (Single)	Decca	1979

=== Honors and inductions ===
On May 23, 1985, William "Count" Basie was presented, posthumously, with the Presidential Medal of Freedom by President Ronald Reagan. The award was received by Aaron Woodward.

On September 11, 1996, the U.S. Post Office issued a Count Basie 32 cents postage stamp. Basie is a part of the Big Band Leaders issue, which, is in turn, part of the Legends of American Music series.

In 2009, Basie was inducted into the New Jersey Hall of Fame.

In May 2019, Basie was inducted into the Blues Hall of Fame at a ceremony in Memphis, TN, presented by The Blues Foundation.

Count Basie award history
Year	Category	Result	Notes
2019	Blues Hall of Fame	Inducted	
2007	Long Island Music Hall of Fame	Inducted	
2005	Nesuhi Ertegun Jazz Hall of Fame	Inducted	
2002	Grammy Lifetime Achievement Award	Winner	
1983	NEA Jazz Masters	Winner	
1981	Grammy Trustees Award	Winner	
1981	Kennedy Center Honors	Honoree	
1982	Hollywood Walk of Fame	Honoree	at 6508 Hollywood Blvd.
1970	Phi Mu Alpha Sinfonia	Initiated	Mu Nu Chapter
1958	Down Beat Jazz Hall of Fame	Inducted	

=== National Recording Registry ===
In 2005, Count Basie's song "One O'Clock Jump" (1937) was included by the National Recording Preservation Board in the Library of Congress National Recording Registry. The board selects songs in an annual basis that are "culturally, historically, or aesthetically significant."
