= Steppin' Out (Jack McDuff album) =

Studio album by Jack McDuff
- Released: 1969
- Recorded: July 14, 1961, January 8, 1963, July, 1964, early 1965 and February 1966; New Jersey and New York City
- Genre: Jazz
- Length: 35:29
- Label: Prestige; PR 7666
- Producer: Lew Futterman

Jack McDuff chronology
I Got a Woman (1964–66)	Steppin' Out (1969)	A Change is Gonna Come (1966)

Professional ratings
Review scores
Source	Rating
Allmusic	3/5 stars
The Rolling Stone Jazz Record Guide	3/5 stars

Steppin' Out is an album by organist Jack McDuff recorded between 1961 and 1966 and released on the Prestige label.

== Reception ==
Allmusic awarded the album 3 stars.

== Track listing ==
All compositions by Jack McDuff except as indicated

1. "Shortnin' Bread" (James Whitcomb Riley) - 5:40
2. "Chicken Feet" - 2:35
3. "Our Miss Brooks" (Harold Vick) - 10:26
4. "Shaky" - 5:00
5. "Godiva Brown" - 5:13
6. "Moody McDuff" - 6:35
- Recorded at Van Gelder Studio in Englewood Cliffs, New Jersey on July 14, 1961 (track 5), January 8, 1963 (tracks 4 & 6) and early 1965 (track 1) and in New York City in July 1964 (track 3) and February 1966 (track 2)

== Personnel ==
- Jack McDuff - organ
- Red Holloway (track 3), Harold Ousley (track 2), Harold Vick (track 5) - tenor saxophone
- George Benson (track 3), Kenny Burrell as K.B. Groovington (tracks 4 & 6), Grant Green (track 5), Pat Martino (track 2) - guitar
- Joe Dukes - drums
- Big band arranged and conducted by Benny Golson (track 1)
