= Ray Barretto =

Puerto Rican jazz musician (1929–2006)

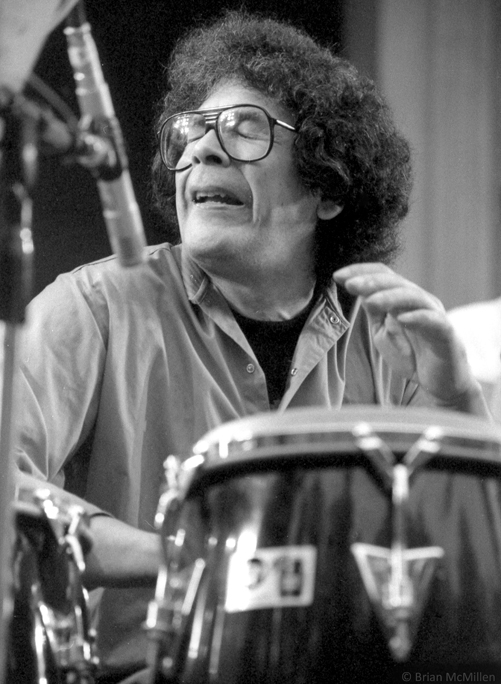
- Barretto in 1982

Background information
- Born: April 29, 1929; Brooklyn, New York, U.S.
- Died: February 17, 2006 (aged 76) Hackensack, New Jersey, U.S.
- Genres: Afro-Cuban jazz; salsa; son cubano; boogaloo; pachanga
- Occupations: Musician; bandleader
- Instrument: Percussion
- Years active: 1949–2006
- Labels: Tico; Riverside; United Artists; Fania; Atlantic; CTI; Concord Jazz; Zoho Music
- Formerly of: The Blackout All-Stars, Fania All-Stars, Adalberto Santiago
- Military Service
- Allegiance: United States
- Branch: United States Army
- Service years: 1946-1949
- Rank: Private First Class

Raymundo Barretto Pagán (April 29, 1929 – February 17, 2006) was an American percussionist and bandleader of Puerto Rican descent. Throughout his career as a percussionist, he played a wide variety of Latin music styles, as well as Latin jazz. His first hit, "El Watusi", was recorded by his Charanga Moderna in 1962, becoming the most successful pachanga song in the United States. In the late 1960s, Barretto became one of the leading exponents of boogaloo and what would later be known as salsa. Nonetheless, many of Barretto's recordings would remain rooted in more traditional genres such as son cubano. A master of the descarga (improvised jam session), Barretto was a long-time member of the Fania All-Stars. His success continued into the 1970s with songs such as "Cocinando" and "Indestructible". His last album for Fania Records, Soy dichoso, was released in 1990. He then formed the New World Spirit jazz ensemble and continued to tour and record until his death in 2006. He is the father of American vocalist and saxophonist Chris Barretto, best known for being the former singer of progressive metal bands Monuments and Periphery.

== Life and career ==
=== Early years ===
Barretto was born on April 29, 1929, in Brooklyn, New York. His parents moved to New York from Puerto Rico in the early 1920s, looking for a better life. His father left their family when Barretto was four, and his mother Delores moved the family to first Spanish Harlem (El Barrio) on NYC's East Side then at the age of 7 to the Bronx. From a young age he was influenced by his mother's love of music and by the jazz of Duke Ellington and Count Basie.

In 1946, when Barretto was 17 years old, he joined the Army. While stationed in Germany, he met Belgian vibraphonist Fats Sadi. However, it was when he heard Dizzy Gillespie's "Manteca" with Gil Fuller and Chano Pozo that he realized his calling. Barretto was not able to escape racial discrimination while stationed in Germany, which led him to a nightclub that was welcoming to black servicemen. He was able to start his music career at this club by playing the back head of a banjo.

=== Beginnings as a sideman ===
In 1949, when Barretto returned home from military service, he started to visit clubs and participated in jam sessions, where he perfected his conga playing. He is credited as being the first U.S. born percussionist to incorporate the conga drum into jazz. On one occasion Charlie Parker heard Barretto play and invited him to play in his band. Later, he was asked to play for José Curbelo and Tito Puente, for whom he played for four years. It was in 1958, while playing for Puente, that Barretto received his first recording credit. Barretto developed a unique style of playing the conga and soon he was sought by other jazz band leaders. Latin percussionists started to appear in jazz groups with frequency as a consequence of Barretto's musical influence.

In 1963 Barretto played conga on Kenny Burrell's album Midnight Blue, noted by several critics as one of the greatest jazz albums.

=== Charanga Moderna and rise to fame ===
In 1960, Barretto was a house musician for the Prestige, Blue Note, and Riverside labels. He also recorded on Columbia Records with jazz flautist Herbie Mann. New York had become the center of Latin music in the United States and a musical genre called pachanga was the Latin music craze of the early 1960s. In 1962, Barretto formed his first group, Charanga La Moderna, and recorded his first hit, "El Watusi" for Tico Records. He was quite successful with the song and the genre, to the point of being typecast (something that he disliked).

=== Boogaloo and early salsa ===
In 1965, Barretto signed with the Latin division of United Artists, UA Latino, and began recording a series of albums in the boogaloo genre, which merges rhythm and blues with Latin music. On his album El Ray Criollo, Barretto explored the modern Latin sounds of New York, combining features of charanga and conjunto to birth a new style which would later be known as salsa. After recording four albums for the United Artists label, Barretto joined the Fania record label in 1967, and his first recording for the new label was the 1968 album Acid, which is often cited as one of the most enduring boogaloo albums, with songs such as "A Deeper Shade of Soul" and the title track was included in the soundtrack of the video game Grand Theft Auto: Vice City Stories on the fictitious Latin music radio station "Radio Espantoso". During this period, Adalberto Santiago was the band's lead vocalist.

=== Success with Fania ===
In 1972 Barretto's Que viva la música was released. "Cocinando," a track from the album, opened the soundtrack of the Fania All Stars film Our Latin Thing in which Barretto had a role. After a number of successful albums, and just as his Afro-Cuban band had attained a remarkable following, most of its members left it to form Típica 73, a multinational salsa conglomerate. In 1973, Barretto recorded the album Indestructible, in which he played "La familia", a song written by José Curbelo in 1953 and recorded by the sonero Carlos Argentino with the Cuban band Sonora Matancera; Tito Allen joined as new vocalist. Allen left the band after Indestructible. The series of departures left Barretto depressed and disappointed with salsa; he then redirected his efforts to jazz, while remaining as musical director of the Fania All Stars. In 1975 he released Barretto, also referred to as the Guararé album, with new vocalists Rubén Blades and Tito Gomez.

Barretto played the conga in recording sessions for the Rolling Stones and the Bee Gees. He performed on Herbie Mann's "Discotheque" album also. In 1975, he was nominated for a Grammy Award for the album Barretto. From 1976 to 1978, Barretto recorded three albums for Atlantic Records, and was nominated for a Grammy for Tomorrow: Barretto Live. In 1979, he recorded La Cuna for CTI Records and produced a salsa record for Fania, titled Rican/Struction, which was named 1980 "Best Album" by Latin N.Y. Magazine, with Barretto crowned as 'Conga Player of the Year'.

=== New World Spirit ===
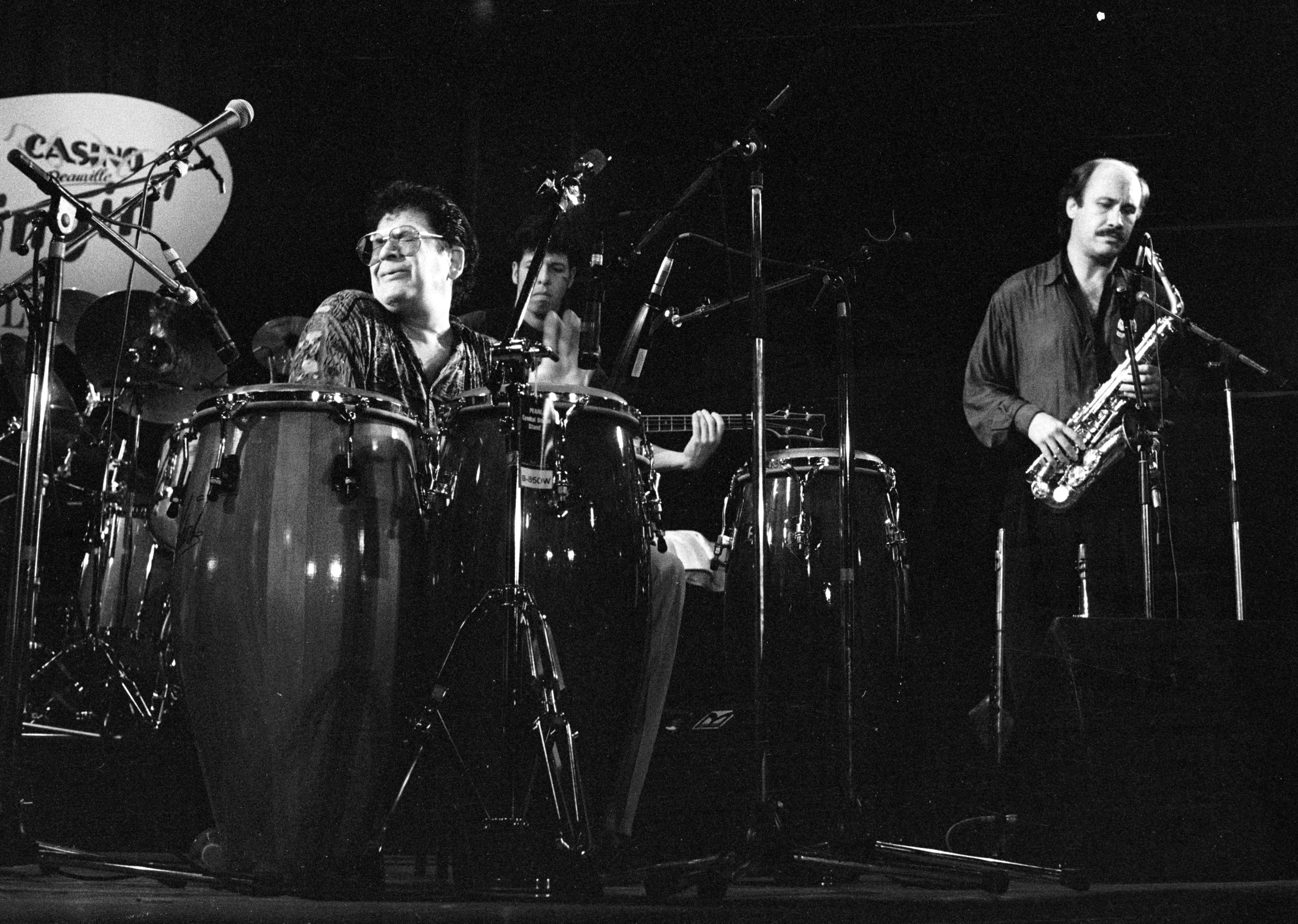
Ray Barretto (left) performing in Deauville, France, in 1991

In 1990, Barretto won his only Grammy, in the Tropical Music category, for the album Ritmo en el corazón ("Rhythm in the Heart"), a collaboration featuring the vocals of Celia Cruz and Adalberto Santiago. His 1968 song "A Deeper Shade Of Soul" was sampled for the 1991 Billboard Hot 100 No. 21 hit "Deeper Shade of Soul" by Dutch band Urban Dance Squad.

Also in the 1990s, a Latin agent, Chino Rodríguez, approached Barretto with a concept he also pitched to Larry Harlow. The idea was "The Latin Legends of Fania", and Barretto, Harlow, Yomo Toro, Pete "el Conde" Rodríguez, Junior González, Ismael Miranda, and Adalberto Santiago came together and formed "The Latin Legends of Fania", booked by Chino Rodríguez of Latin Music Booking.com. However, in 1992 Barretto left the Legends to focus on his new jazz ensemble, New World Spirits, with which he recorded several albums for the Concord Jazz label.

In 1999, Barretto was inducted into the International Latin Music Hall of Fame.

In 2006, the National Endowment for the Arts awarded Barretto its Jazz Masters Award.

Barretto lived in Northern New Jersey and was an active musical producer, as well as the leader of a touring band which embarked on tours of the United States, Africa, Europe, Israel and Latin America.

=== Death ===
A resident of Norwood, New Jersey, Barretto died of heart failure and complications of multiple health issues on February 17, 2006, at Hackensack University Medical Center in New Jersey. His body was flown to Puerto Rico, where Barretto was given formal honors by the Institute of Puerto Rican Culture; his remains were cremated.

== Discography ==
External audio
- You may listen to Ray Barretto's "El Watusi" on YouTube.

=== As leader ===
- Barretto Para Bailar (Riverside 93531, 1961)
- Latino! (Riverside 93520, 1962)
- Charanga Moderna (Tico 1087, 1962)
- On Fire Again (Encendido Otra Vez) (Tico 1096, 1963)
- The Big Hits Latin Style (Tico 1099, 1963)
- Moderna De Siempre (Tico 1102, 1963)
- Guajira y Guaguancó (Tico 1114, 1964)
- Viva Watusi! (United Artists/UA Latino 6445, 1965)
- Señor 007 (United Artists/UA Latino 6478, 1965)
- El Ray Criollo (United Artists/UA Latino 6543, 1966)
- Latino Con Soul (United Artists/UA Latino 6593, 1967)
- Acid (Fania 346, 1968)
- Hard Hands (Fania 362, 1968)
- Together (Fania 378, 1969)
- Head Sounds (Fania 388, 1969) compilation
- Barretto Power (Fania 391, 1970)
- The Message (Fania 403, 1971)
- From the Beginning (Fania 410, 1971) compilation
- Que Viva La Música (Fania 427, 1972)
- The Other Road (Fania 448, 1973)
- Indestructible (Fania 456, 1973)
- Barretto (Fania 486, 1975)
- Tomorrow: Barretto Live (Atlantic SD 2-509, 1976)
- Energy to Burn (Fania 505, 1977) compilation
- Eye of the Beholder (Atlantic SD 19140, 1977)
- Gracias (Fania 528, 1978)
- Can You Feel It (Atlantic SD 19198, 1978)
- Rican/Struction (Fania 552, 1979)
- La Cuna (CTI Records 9002, 1979)
- Giant Force (Fania 579, 1980)
- Rhythm of Life (Fania 605, 1982)
- Todo Se Va Poder (Fania 633, 1984)
- Aquí Se Puede (Fania 642, 1987)
- Irresistible (Fania 658, 1989)
- Handprints (Concord Picante 4473, 1991)
- Soy Dichoso (Fania 666, 1992)
- Salsa Caliente de Nu York! (Nascente 075, 2001)
- Fuerza Gigante (Live in Puerto Rico - April 27, 2001) (Universe UV-118; AJ Records A2K-84744, 2001)
- Homage to Art Blakey and the Jazz Messengers (Sunnyside 1105, 2002)
- Time Was – Time Is (O+ Music 109, 2005)
- Standards Rican-ditioned (Zoho Music 200610, 2006)

With New World Spirit

- Ancestral Messages (Concord Picante 4549, 1993)
- Taboo (Concord Picante 4601, 1994)
- My Summertime (Owl 082; Blue Note 72438 35830 27, 1995)
- Contact! (Blue Note 72438 56974 25, 1997)
- Portraits in Jazz and Clave (RCA Victor 74321 68452 24, 1999)
- Trancedance with James Moody (Circular Moves 7008, 2001)
- Hot Hands (Concord Picante 2177, 2003) 2-CD compilation of Ancestral Messages and Taboo

=== As sideman ===
With Gene Ammons

- Blue Gene (Prestige, 1958)
- Boss Tenor (Prestige, 1960)
- Up Tight! (Prestige, 1961)
- Boss Soul! (Prestige, 1961)
- Twisting the Jug with Joe Newman and Jack McDuff (Prestige, 1961)
- Soul Summit Vol. 2 (Prestige, 1962) – rec. 1961
- Late Hour Special (Prestige, 1964) – rec. 1961
- Velvet Soul (Prestige, 1964) – rec. 1961
- Goodbye (Prestige, 1974)

With Kenny Burrell

- Bluesy Burrell with Coleman Hawkins (Moodsville, 1962)
- Midnight Blue (Blue Note, 1963)
- Crash! with Brother Jack McDuff (Prestige, 1963)
- Soul Call (Prestige, 1964)
- God Bless the Child (CTI, 1971)

With Celia Cruz and Adalberto Santiago

- Tremendo Trío! (Fania 623, 1983)

With Celia Cruz

- Ritmo En El Corazón (Fania 651, 1988)

With Eddie "Lockjaw" Davis

- Bacalao with Shirley Scott (Prestige, 1959)
- Afro-Jaws (Riverside, 1960)
- Misty with Shirley Scott (Moodsville, 1963) – rec. 1960
- Lock, the Fox (RCA Victor, 1966)

With Lou Donaldson

- Swing and Soul (Blue Note, 1957)
- Blues Walk (Blue Note, 1958)
- Light-Foot (Blue Note, 1959)
- The Time Is Right (Blue Note, 1959)
- Midnight Sun (Blue Note, 1960)
- Cole Slaw (Argo, 1964)

With Jimmy Forrest

- Most Much! (Prestige, 1961)
- Soul Street (New Jazz, 1962)

With Eddie Harris

- Mean Greens (Atlantic, 1966)
- The Electrifying Eddie Harris (Atlantic, 1967)

With Yusef Lateef

- Yusef Lateef's Detroit (Atlantic, 1969)
- In a Temple Garden (CTI Records, 1979)

With Johnny Lytle

- Moon Child (Jazzland, 1962)
- The Soulful Rebel (Milestone, 1971)

With Herbie Mann

- Flute, Brass, Vibes and Percussion (Verve, 1959)
- The Common Ground (Atlantic, 1960)
- The Family of Mann (Atlantic, 1961)
- Herbie Mann Returns to the Village Gate (Atlantic, 1963) – rec. 1961
- Our Mann Flute (Atlantic, 1966)
- The Herbie Mann String Album (Atlantic, 1967)
- Glory of Love (A&M/CTI, 1967)
- Discothèque (Atlantic, 1975)
- Waterbed (Atlantic, 1975)

With Johnny "Hammond" Smith

- Talk That Talk (New Jazz, 1960)
- Open House! (Riverside, 1963)

With Sonny Stitt

- Stitt Meets Brother Jack with Jack McDuff (Prestige, 1962)
- The Matadors Meet the Bull (Roulette, 1965)

With Cal Tjader

- Along Comes Cal (Verve, 1967)
- Hip Vibrations (Verve, 1967)

With others

- Average White Band, Cut the Cake (Atlantic, 1975)
- Average White Band, Warmer Communications (Atlantic, 1978)
- Bee Gees, Main Course (RSO, 1975)
- George Benson, The Other Side of Abbey Road (A&M/CTI, 1970)
- Ray Bryant, Dancing the Big Twist (Columbia, 1961)
- Arnett Cobb, Party Time (Prestige, 1959)
- Billy Cobham, Spectrum (Atlantic, 1973)
- Judy Collins, True Stories and Other Dreams (Elektra, 1973)
- Crosby, Stills & Nash, CSN (Atlantic, 1977)
- Deodato, Prelude (CTI Records, 1972)
- Bill Doggett, Doggett Beat for Dancing Feet (King, 1957)
- Art Farmer, Listen to Art Farmer and the Orchestra (Mercury, 1963) – rec. 1962
- Cheo Feliciano, With a Little Help for My Friend (Vaya, 1973)
- Cheo Feliciano, Felicidades (Vaya, 1973)
- Red Garland Trio, Manteca (Prestige, 1958)
- Red Garland Trio, Rojo (Prestige, 1961)
- Dizzy Gillespie, Carnegie Hall Concert (Verve, 1961) – live
- Al Grey, The Al Grey - Billy Mitchell Sextet with Billy Mitchell (Argo, 1962) – live rec. 1961
- Slide Hampton, Jazz with a Twist (Atlantic, 1962)
- Jake Holmes, How Much Time (Columbia, 1972)
- Willis Jackson, Thunderbird (Prestige, 1962)
- Clifford Jordan, Soul Fountain (Vortex, 1970)
- Ben E. King, Spanish Harlem (Atco, 1961)
- Junior Mance, I Believe to My Soul (Atlantic, 1968)
- Jack McDuff, Somethin' Slick! (Prestige, 1963)
- Wes Montgomery, SO Much Guitar! (Riverside, 1961)
- Mark Murphy, Rah (Riverside, 1961)
- Oliver Nelson, Impressions of Phaedra (United Artists, 1962)
- Tony Orlando and Dawn, He Don't Love You (Like I Love You) (Elektra, 1975)
- Dave Pike, Limbo Carnival (New Jazz, 1962)
- Michel Sardaby, Michel Sardaby in New York (Sound Hills, 2002)
- Jeremy Steig and Eddie Gómez, Rain Forest (CMP, 1980)
- The Tymes, Tymes Up (RCA Victor, 1976)
- Julius Watkins, French Horns for My Lady (Philips, 1962)
- Weather Report, Mysterious Traveller (Columbia, 1974)
- Frank Wess, Southern Comfort (Prestige, 1962)
- Charles Williams, Stickball (Mainstream, 1972)
- Edgar Winter, Edgar Winter's White Trash (Epic, 1971)

== See also ==
- Salsa
- Charanga (Cuba)
- Afro-Cuban jazz
- List of Puerto Ricans
