= Getting Our Thing Together =

Studio album by Jack McDuff
- Released: 1968
- Recorded: October 1968
- Studio: Ter Mar Studios, Chicago, Illinois
- Genre: Jazz
- Label: Cadet; LPS 817
- Producer: Lew Futterman

Jack McDuff chronology
The Natural Thing (1968)	Getting Our Thing Together (1968)	Gin and Orange (1969)

Getting Our Thing Together is a 1968 album by organist Brother Jack McDuff which was his second release on the Cadet label.

== Track listing ==
All compositions by Jack McDuff except as indicated

1. "Win, Lose Or Draw" (Harold Ousley) - 3:00 (Arranged by Richard Evans)
2. "Black Is!" - 2:54 (Arranged by Brother Jack McDuff)
3. "Jelly Jam" (Larry Tassi, Bob Sedita, Mike Sagarese, Greg Geddes) - 4:00 (Arranged by Richard Evans)
4. "The Pulpit" - 5:49 (Arranged by Brother Jack McDuff)
5. "You Sho' Walk Funky" (Richard Evans) - 3:30 (Arranged by Richard Evans)
6. "Hold It for a Minute" - 4:30 (Arranged by Brother Jack McDuff)
7. "Summertime" (George Gershwin, DuBose Heyward) - 4:08 (Arranged by Brother Jack McDuff)
8. "Up, Up and Away" (Jimmy Webb) - 4:27 (Arranged by Brother Jack McDuff)
9. "Two Lines" - 4:40 (Arranged by Brother Jack McDuff)

== Personnel ==
- Brother Jack McDuff - organ, arranger
- Unidentified Big band arranged and conducted by Richard Evans

== Other credits ==
- Lew Futterman - Producer
- Richard Evans - Production Supervisor
- Jerry Griffith - Album Design
- Nancy Reiner - Cover Art
- Stu Black - Engineer
- Bill Ardis - Liner Notes
