= Red Soul =

Studio album by Red Holloway
- Released: 1966
- Recorded: December 1965; New York City
- Genre: Jazz
- Label: Prestige; PR 7473
- Producer: Lew Futterman, Peter Paul

Red Holloway chronology
Sax, Strings & Soul (1964)	Red Soul (1966)	Forecast: Sonny & Red (1976)

Red Soul is an album by saxophonist Red Holloway recorded in 1965 and released on the Prestige label.

== Reception ==
Professional ratings
Review scores
Source	Rating
Allmusic	3/5 stars

Allmusic awarded the album 3 stars stating "Good to get, if you can find it".

== Track listing ==
All compositions by George Benson except where noted.

1. "Making Tracks" – 3:00
2. "Movin' On" – 3:27
3. "Good & Groovy" – 4:02
4. "Get It Together" – 3:32
5. "Big Fat Lady" – 1:55
6. "A Tear in My Heart" (Norman Simmons) – 6:20
7. "Eagle Jaws" (Red Holloway) – 2:45
8. "I'm All Packed" (Simmons) – 5:05
9. "The Regulars" (Harold Ousley) – 4:14

== Personnel ==
- Red Holloway - tenor saxophone
- George Benson - guitar
- Dr. Lonnie Smith - organ (tracks 1–5)
- Norman Simmons - piano (tracks 6–9)
- Chuck Rainey - electric bass (tracks 1–5)
- Paul Breslin - bass (tracks 6–9)
- Ray Lucas (tracks 1–5), Frank Severino (tracks 6–9) - drums
