= Twisting the Jug =

Studio album by Gene Ammons with Joe Newman and Jack McDuff
- Released: 1961
- Recorded: November 28, 1961
- Studio: Van Gelder Studio, Englewood Cliffs, New Jersey
- Genre: Jazz
- Length: 38:10
- Label: Prestige; PR 7238

Gene Ammons chronology
Boss Soul! (1961)	Twisting the Jug (1961)	Brother Jack Meets the Boss (1962)

Jack McDuff chronology
Goodnight, It's Time to Go (1961)	Twisting the Jug (1961)	On With It! (1961)

Professional ratings
Review scores
Source	Rating
Allmusic	4/5 stars
Down Beat	3/5 stars

Twisting the Jug is an album by saxophonist Gene Ammons with trumpeter Joe Newman and organist Jack McDuff recorded in 1961 and released on the Prestige label.

== Reception ==
The Allmusic review stated: "Gene Ammons' 1961 session Twistin' the Jug features not only the powerhouse tenor playing at the top of his form, but a killer set of sidemen... this is a fun, listenable early soul-jazz session featuring two of the greats of the field".

== Track listing ==
All compositions by Gene Ammons, except where indicated.

1. "Twistin' the Jug" – 4:40
2. "Born to Be Blue" (Mel Tormé, Robert Wells) – 7:20
3. "Satin Doll" (Duke Ellington, Johnny Mercer, Billy Strayhorn) – 6:46
4. "Moten Swing" (Bennie Moten, Buster Moten) – 4:59
5. "Stormy Monday" (Bob Crowder, Billy Eckstine, Earl Hines) – 8:42
6. "Down the Line" – 5:43

== Personnel ==
- Gene Ammons – tenor saxophone
- Joe Newman – trumpet
- Jack McDuff – organ
- Wendell Marshall – bass
- Walter Perkins – drums
- Ray Barretto – congas
