= Do It Now! (Jack McDuff album) =

Studio album by Jack McDuff
- Released: 1967
- Recorded: December 15 & 20, 1966, and May 23, 1967; New York City
- Genre: Soul jazz
- Label: Atlantic; 1484
- Producer: Lew Futterman

Jack McDuff chronology
Tobacco Road (1966)	Do It Now! (1967)	Double Barrelled Soul (1967)

Do It Now! is a 1967 album by the organist Brother Jack McDuff which was his third release on the Atlantic label.

== Reception ==
Professional ratings
Review scores
Source	Rating
AllMusic	3/5 stars
The Virgin Encyclopedia of Jazz	3/5 stars

Scott Yanow in his review for AllMusic wrote, "McDuff and his regular group of the period swing their way through five of McDuff's originals and two obscurities with plenty of spirit, if not a great deal of originality."

== Track listing ==
All compositions by Jack McDuff except as indicated

1. "Snap Back Jack" - 4:50
2. "Mush Melon" - 4:44
3. "Summer Samba (Samba de Verão)" (Norman Gimbel, Marcos Valle, Paulo Sérgio Valle) - 5:10
4. "Do It Now" - 5:35
5. "Strolling Blues" - 8:12
6. "Pleasant Moments" (Harold Ousley) - 6:29
7. "Mutt & Jeff" - 4:35
- Recorded in New York City on December 15, 1966 (tracks 2–5), December 20, 1966 (tracks 6 & 7) and May 23, 1967 (track 1).

== Personnel ==
- Jack McDuff - organ
- Danny Turner - alto saxophone, tenor saxophone, flute
- Leo Johnson - tenor saxophone, flute
- Melvin Sparks - guitar
- Ray Appleton (tracks 2–7), Ray Lucas (track 1) - drums
