= Who Knows What Tomorrow's Gonna Bring? =

Studio album by Brother Jack McDuff
- Released: 1970
- Recorded: December 1–3, 1970
- Genre: Jazz
- Label: Blue Note
- Producer: Lew Futterman

Brother Jack McDuff chronology
To Seek a New Home (1970)	Who Knows What Tomorrow's Gonna Bring? (1970)	The Heatin' System (1971)

Who Knows What Tomorrow's Gonna Bring? is an album by American organist Brother Jack McDuff recorded in 1970 and released on the Blue Note label.

== Reception ==
The Allmusic review by Thom Jurek awarded the album 3½ stars and stated "Who Knows What Tomorrow's Gonna Bring? is one of Brother Jack's more adventurous dates, and incorporates all sorts of strange pop elements in the mix... The sheer spaced-out vibe is an overwhelming attraction to Who Knows What Tomorrow's Gonna Bring?, because it is unlike any other record in McDuff's massive catalog – even stranger than Moon Rappin'".

Professional ratings
Review scores
Source	Rating
Allmusic	3.5/5 stars

== Track listing ==
All compositions by Jack McDuff except as indicated

1. "Who Knows What Tomorrow's Gonna Bring?" (Ray Draper) – 5:56
2. "Ya Ya Ya Ya Ya Ya" (Draper) – 9:46
3. "Who's Pimpin' Who?" (Draper) – 5:44
4. "Classic Funke" – 7:24
5. "Ya'll Remember Boogie?" (Draper) – 4:50
6. "Wank's Thang" – 6:04

- Recorded at The Hit Factory in New York City on December 1 (tracks 2 & 5), December 2 (tracks 1 & 3) and December 3 (tracks 4 & 6), 1970.

== Personnel ==
- Brother Jack McDuff – organ
- Randy Brecker, Olu Dara – trumpet
- Dick Griffin, John Pierson – trombone
- Paul Griffin – piano
- Joe Beck – guitar
- Tony Levin – electric bass
- Donald McDonald – drums
- Mike Mainieri – percussion
- Ray Draper – percussion, vocals, tuba, arranger
