= Brother Jack McDuff Live! =

Live album by Jack McDuff
- Released: 1963
- Recorded: June 5, 1963
- Venue: The Front Room, Newark, New Jersey
- Genre: Soul jazz
- Label: Prestige; PR 7274
- Producer: Lew Futterman, Peter Paul

Jack McDuff chronology
Crash! (1963)	Brother Jack McDuff Live! (1963)	Brother Jack at the Jazz Workshop Live! (1963)

Brother Jack McDuff Live! is a live album by jazz organist Jack McDuff, recorded in New Jersey in 1963 and released on the Prestige label. The album is one of the first albums to feature guitarist George Benson; Benson had recorded the novelty blues single "It Should Have Been Me #2" as an 11-year-old in 1954, but he did not record commercially again until he joined McDuff's band in 1963.

== Reception ==
Professional ratings
Review scores
Source	Rating
Allmusic	3/5 stars
The Rolling Stone Jazz Record Guide	3/5 stars

In his review for AllMusic, Scott Mason states,"Brother Jack McDuff Live! is an outstanding album, one of the purest examples ever of quite possibly the finest Hammond B3 organ player in the world".

== Track listing ==
All compositions by Jack McDuff except as indicated

1. "Rock Candy" – 6:40
2. "It Ain't Necessarily So" (George Gershwin, Ira Gershwin) – 6:37
3. "Sanctified Samba" – 4:50
4. "Whistle While You Work" (Frank Churchill, Larry Morey) – 5:11
5. "A Real Goodun'" – 7:42
6. "Undecided" (Sydney Robin, Charlie Shavers) – 8:16

== Personnel ==
- Jack McDuff – organ
- Red Holloway – tenor saxophone
- George Benson – guitar
- Joe Dukes – drums
