= Midnight Blue (Kenny Burrell album) =

Studio album by Kenny Burrell
- Released: Early May 1963
- Recorded: January 8, 1963; Van Gelder Studio, Englewood Cliffs
- Genre: Jazz
- Length: 35:39 (original LP); 45:18 (CD reissue)
- Labels: Blue Note; BLP 4123 (mono); BST 84123 (stereo)
- Producer: Alfred Lion

Kenny Burrell chronology
| Bluesy Burrell (1962) | Midnight Blue (1963) | Crash! (1963) |

Midnight Blue is an album by American jazz guitarist Kenny Burrell featuring Stanley Turrentine on tenor saxophone, Major Holley on double bass, Bill English on drums and Ray Barretto on conga. It was released on Blue Note Records in 1963.

== Critical reception and legacy ==
Professional ratings
Review scores
| Source | Rating |
|---|---|
| Allmusic | 5/5 stars |
| Encyclopedia of Popular Music | 5/5 stars |
| The Penguin Guide to Jazz Recordings | 3.5/4 stars |

Scott Yanow of AllMusic called the album "one of ... Kenny Burrell's best-known sessions for the Blue Note label."

Jazz Improv magazine lists the album among its top five recommended recordings for Burrell, indicating that "[i]f you need to know 'the Blue Note sound', here it is".

In 2005, NPR included the album in its "Basic Jazz Library", describing it as "one of the great jazzy blues records". The album has been re-issued by Blue Note.

The cover artwork of Elvis Costello's 1981 country album Almost Blue pays homage to the artwork of Midnight Blue. In 2012, musical comedians Three Bonzos And A Piano parodied the album cover on their album Bum Notes.

== Track listing ==
Except where otherwise noted, all songs composed by Kenny Burrell.

1. "Chitlins con Carne" – 5:30
2. "Mule" (Burrell, Major Holley Jr.) – 6:56
3. "Soul Lament" – 2:43
4. "Midnight Blue" – 4:02
5. "Wavy Gravy" – 5:47
6. "Gee, Baby, Ain't I Good to You" (Andy Razaf, Don Redman) – 4:25
7. "Saturday Night Blues" – 6:16
8. "Kenny's Sound" – 4:43 (Bonus track on CD reissue)
9. "K Twist" – 3:36 (Bonus track on CD reissue)

== Personnel ==
=== Musicians ===
- Kenny Burrell – guitar
- Stanley Turrentine – tenor saxophone (except tracks 3, 4, 6, 9)
- Major Holley – bass (except 3)
- Bill English – drums (except 3)
- Ray Barretto – conga (except 3, 6)

=== Technical personnel ===
==== Original release ====
- Alfred Lion – producer
- Rudy Van Gelder – recording engineer
- Reid Miles – cover design, typography
- Francis Wolff – photography
- Leonard Feather – liner notes

==== Reissue ====
- Michael Cuscuna – producer (1987 and 1999 reissued)
- Ron McMaster – remastering engineer (1987 reissue)
- Rudy Van Gelder – remastering engineer (1999 reissue)
- Bob Blumenthal – reissue liner notes (1999 reissue)

== Charts ==
Chart performance for Midnight Blue
| Chart (2021–2026) | Peak position |
|---|---|
| Australian Jazz & Blues Albums (ARIA) | 18 |
| German Albums (Offizielle Top 100) | 41 |
| Scottish Albums (Official Charts) | 58 |
| UK Albums Sales (Official Charts) | 54 |
| UK Jazz & Blues Albums (Official Charts) | 3 |
| US Top Album Sales (Billboard) | 83 |
| US Top Jazz Albums (Billboard) | 5 |
| US Top Traditional Jazz Albums (Billboard) | 4 |
