= Prelude (Jack McDuff album) =

Studio album by Jack McDuff
- Released: 1964
- Recorded: December 24, 1963; New York City
- Genre: Jazz
- Label: Prestige; PR 7333
- Producer: Lew Futterman, Peter Paul

Jack McDuff chronology
Brother Jack at the Jazz Workshop Live! (1963)	Prelude (1964)	Cookin' Together (1964)

Professional ratings
Review scores
Source	Rating
Allmusic	4/5 stars

Prelude is an album by organist Jack McDuff recorded in 1963 and released on the Prestige label.

== Reception ==
Allmusic awarded the album 4 stars stating "Prelude was a successful match of McDuff's small-combo organ jazz with big band arrangements by Benny Golson. In part, that was because the blend was well-executed, never fighting with or drowning out McDuff's organ. But it was also because the mixture made it stand out amidst the scads of organ jazz records being churned out in the early '60s".

== Track listing ==
All compositions by Jack McDuff except as indicated

1. "A Kettle of Fish" – 3:55
2. "Candlelight" – 2:54
3. "Put On a Happy Face" (Lee Adams, Charles Strouse) – 3:13
4. "Prelude" (Benny Golson) – 8:41
5. "Mean to Me" (Fred E. Ahlert, Roy Turk) – 3:57
6. "Carry Me Home" – 4:30
7. "Easy Living" (Ralph Rainger, Leo Robin) – 3:44
8. "Oh! Look at Me Now" (Joe Bushkin, John DeVries) – 4:28
9. "Dig Cousin Will" – 4:16

== Personnel ==
- Jack McDuff – organ
- Jerry Kail, Danny Stiles – trumpet
- Billy Byers, Burt Collins, Tom McIntosh – trombone
- Don Ashworth, Bob Northern – French horn
- Red Holloway – tenor saxophone
- Marvin Holliday, George Marge – baritone saxophone
- George Benson – guitar
- Richard Davis – bass
- Joe Dukes, Mel Lewis – drums
- Benny Golson – conductor, arranger
