= Down Home Style =

Studio album by Brother Jack McDuff
- Released: 1969
- Recorded: June 10, 1969
- Genre: Jazz
- Length: 38:59
- Label: Blue Note
- Producer: Lew Futterman, Larry Rogers

Brother Jack McDuff chronology
Gin and Orange (1968)	Down Home Style (1969)	Moon Rappin' (1969)

Down Home Style is an album by American organist Brother Jack McDuff recorded in 1969 and released on the Blue Note label.

== Reception ==
The Allmusic review by Stephen Thomas Erlewine awarded the album 4 stars and stated "A set of gritty electric funk and soulful blues, Down Home Style is an excellent showcase for Brother Jack McDuff's gripping, funky style... the record is designed as a showcase for McDuff's wild, intoxicating Hammond organ, and he runs with the it, demonstrating every one of his tricks".

Professional ratings
Review scores
Source	Rating
Allmusic	4/5 stars

== Track listing ==
All compositions by Jack McDuff except as indicated

1. "The Vibrator" - 4:48
2. "Down Home Style" - 5:06
3. "Memphis in June" (Hoagy Carmichael, Paul Francis Webster) - 4:16
4. "Theme from Electric Surfboard" - 3:34
5. "It's All a Joke" - 3:48
6. "Butter (For Yo Popcorn)" - 4:08
7. "Groovin'" (Eddie Brigati, Felix Cavaliere) - 5:18
8. "As She Walked Away" - 8:01
  - Recorded in Memphis, Tennessee on June 10, 1969.

== Personnel ==
- Brother Jack McDuff - organ
- Jay Arnold - tenor saxophone
- Charlie Freeman - guitar
- Sammy Creason - drums
- Unknown - electric bass
- Unidentified large band (tracks 2, 3 & 6)
