= Nothin' but the Blues (Joe Williams album) =

Studio album by Joe Williams
- Released: 1984
- Recorded: November 16 & 17, 1983
- Genre: Vocal jazz
- Length: 59:21
- Label: Delos
- Producer: Ralph Jungheim

Joe Williams chronology
Dave Pell's Prez Conference (1979)	Nothin' but the Blues (1984)	I Just Wanna Sing (1985)

Professional ratings
Review scores
Source	Rating
Allmusic	link

Nothin' but the Blues is a 1984 (see 1984 in music) album by the American jazz and blues singer Joe Williams with Red Holloway & His Blues All-Stars. For his work on the album, Williams was awarded the 1985 Grammy for Best Jazz Vocal Performance.

== Track listing ==
1. "Who She Do" (Joe Williams) 5:15
2. "Just a Dream" (Big Bill Broonzy, Jimmy Clanton) 4:44
3. "Hold It Right There" (Clark Terry, William Grey, Eddie "Cleanhead" Vinson) 2:42
4. "Please Send Me Someone to Love" (Percy Mayfield) 5:11
5. "Going to Chicago Blues" (Jimmy Rushing, Count Basie) 4:48
6. "Ray Brown's in Town" (Red Holloway) 3:51
7. "In the Evening"/"Rocks in My Bed" (Leroy Carr)/(Duke Ellington) 6:55
8. "Alright, OK, You Win" (Mayme Watts, Sidney Wyche) 4:41
9. "Mean Old World"/"Wee Baby Blues" (Al Frazier, T-Bone Walker)/(Big Joe Turner, Pete Johnson) 7:34
10. "The Comeback" (Charles Frazier) 5:03
11. "Tell Me Where to Scratch" (Williams) 5:04
12. "Sent For You Yesterday" (Basie, Rushing, Eddie Durham) 3:29

== Personnel ==
Recorded November 16 & 17, 1983, in Hollywood, Los Angeles, California, United States:

- Joe Williams - vocals
- Jack McDuff - organ & piano
- Phil Upchurch - guitar
- Ray Brown - bass guitar
- Gerryck King - drums
- Red Holloway - leader, tenor sax
- Eddie "Cleanhead" Vinson - vocal (#3 only) & alto sax
