= The Concert McDuff =

Live album by Jack McDuff
- Released: 1965
- Recorded: June 1964
- Venue: Gyllene Cirkeln, Stockholm, Sweden
- Genre: Soul jazz
- Label: Prestige; PR 7362
- Producer: Lew Futterman

Jack McDuff chronology
The Dynamic Jack McDuff (1964)	The Concert McDuff (1965)	Silk and Soul (1964-65)

The Concert McDuff is a live album by organist Jack McDuff recorded at the Golden Circle in Stockholm in 1964 and released on the Prestige label.

== Reception ==
Professional ratings
Review scores
Source	Rating
Allmusic	4.5/5 stars
Record Mirror	4/5 stars
The Rolling Stone Jazz Record Guide	3/5 stars

Allmusic awarded the album 4½ stars and its review by Richie Unterberger states, "For the most part the tunes have a frenetic organ jazz charge, perfect for getting you up and going without a coffee".

== Track listing ==
All compositions by Jack McDuff except as indicated

1. "Swedenin'" - 6:40
2. "The Girl from Ipanema" (Antônio Carlos Jobim, Vinicius de Moraes, Norman Gimbel) - 5:53
3. "Another Goodun'" - 7:57
4. "'Sokay" - 4:52
5. "Save Your Love for Me" (Buddy Johnson) - 3:45
6. "Four Brothers" (Jimmy Giuffre) - 4:30
7. "Lew's Piece" - 7:44

== Personnel ==
- Jack McDuff - organ
- Red Holloway - tenor saxophone
- George Benson - guitar
- Joe Dukes - drums
