= Hallelujah Time! =

Studio album by Jack McDuff
- Released: 1967
- Recorded: June 5, 1963, July 1964 and February 1966; New Jersey and New York City
- Genre: Soul jazz
- Label: Prestige; PR 7492
- Producer: Lew Futterman

Jack McDuff chronology
Walk On By (1966)	Hallelujah Time! (1967)	The Midnight Sun (1963-66)

Professional ratings
Review scores
Source	Rating
Allmusic	3/5 stars

Hallelujah Time! is an album by organist Jack McDuff recorded between 1963 and 1966 and released on the Prestige label.

== Reception ==
Allmusic awarded the album 3 stars.

== Track listing ==
All compositions by Jack McDuff except as indicated

1. "Almost Like Being in Love" (Alan Jay Lerner, Frederick Loewe) - 5:41
2. "East of the Sun" (Brooks Bowman) - 5:06
3. "Au Privave" (Charlie Parker) - 3:19
4. "Undecided" (Sid Robin, Charlie Shavers) - 8:00
5. "Hallelujah Time" (Oscar Peterson) - 3:45
6. "The Live People" - 4:16

== Personnel ==
- Jack McDuff - organ
- Red Holloway (tracks 1–5), Harold Ousley (track 6) - tenor saxophone
- George Benson (tracks 2–5), Pat Martino (tracks 1 & 6) - guitar
- Joe Dukes - drums
