= Stitt Meets Brother Jack =

Studio album by Sonny Stitt with Jack McDuff
- Released: 1962
- Recorded: February 16, 1962
- Studio: Van Gelder Studio, Englewood Cliffs, New Jersey
- Genre: Jazz
- Length: 38:06
- Label: Prestige; PR 7244
- Producer: Esmond Edwards

Sonny Stitt chronology
Boss Tenors (1961)	Stitt Meets Brother Jack (1962)	Boss Tenors in Orbit! (1962)

Jack McDuff chronology
Brother Jack Meets the Boss (1962)	Stitt Meets Brother Jack (1962)	Soul Summit (1962)

'Nother Fu'ther Cover

Stitt Meets Brother Jack (also released as 'Nother Fu'ther) is an album by saxophonist Sonny Stitt with organist Jack McDuff recorded in 1962 and released on the Prestige label.

== Reception ==
Professional ratings
Review scores
Source	Rating
Down Beat	4/5 stars
Allmusic	4/5 stars
The Penguin Guide to Jazz Recordings	2.5/4 stars

The Allmusic review by Scott Yanow stated, "a spirited outing... the music always swings in a soulful boppish way. Worth picking up although not essential".

== Track listing ==
All compositions by Sonny Stitt except where noted.

1. "All of Me" (Gerald Marks, Seymour Simons) – 4:50
2. "Pam Ain't Blue" – 4:33
3. "Time After Time" (Sammy Cahn, Jule Styne) – 4:38
4. "Ringin' In" – 5:19
5. "'Nother Fu'ther" – 6:24
6. "When Sonny Gets Blue" (Jack McDuff, Sonny Stitt) – 6:42
7. "Thirty-Three, Ninety Six" – 6:02

== Personnel ==
- Sonny Stitt – tenor saxophone
- Jack McDuff – organ
- Eddie Diehl – guitar
- Art Taylor – drums
- Ray Barretto – congas
