= The Midnight Sun (Jack McDuff album) =

Studio album by Jack McDuff
- Released: 1968
- Recorded: June 5, 1963, July 1964, late 1965 and February 1966; New Jersey and New York City
- Genre: Soul jazz
- Label: Prestige; PR 7529
- Producer: Lew Futterman

Jack McDuff chronology
Hallelujah Time! (1963-66)	The Midnight Sun (1968)	Soul Circle (1964-66)

Professional ratings
Review scores
Source	Rating
Allmusic	3/5 stars

The Midnight Sun is an album by organist Jack McDuff recorded between 1963 and 1966 and released on the Prestige label.

== Reception ==
Allmusic awarded the album 3 stars.

== Track listing ==
All compositions by Jack McDuff except as indicated

1. "Love Walked In" (George Gershwin, Ira Gershwin) - 7:52
2. "Misconstrued" - 7:00
3. "The Midnight Sun" (Lionel Hampton, Sonny Burke, Johnny Mercer) - 6:20
4. "Rockabye" (George Benson) - 3:50
5. "Stop It" - 6:09

== Personnel ==
- Jack McDuff - organ
- Red Holloway - tenor saxophone (tracks 1–3 & 5)
- George Benson (tracks 1–3), Pat Martino (track 5) - guitar
- Joe Dukes - drums (tracks 1–3 & 5)
- Big band arranged and conducted by Benny Golson (track 4)
