= Brother Jack at the Jazz Workshop Live! =

Live album by Jack McDuff
- Released: 1963
- Recorded: October 3, 1963
- Venues: The Jazz Workshop, San Francisco, California
- Genre: Soul jazz
- Labels: Prestige; PR 7286
- Producers: Lew Futterman, Peter Paul

Jack McDuff chronology
Brother Jack McDuff Live! (1963)	Brother Jack at the Jazz Workshop Live! (1963)	Prelude (1963)

Brother Jack at the Jazz Workshop Live! is a live album by organist Jack McDuff recorded in San Francisco in 1963 and released on the Prestige label.

== Reception ==
Professional ratings
Review scores
Source	Rating
Allmusic	3/5 stars
The Rolling Stone Jazz Record Guide	3/5 stars

Allmusic awarded the album 3 stars and its review by Stewart Mason states, "McDuff is firmly in control of the set all the way. His organ playing can seem almost clichéd to the soul-jazz novice, until one realizes that these riffs became soul-jazz clichés because so many lesser players immediately copped his licks. Here, one can hear them from the source, and it's an eye-opening experience".

"Vas Dis" was covered by UK rock band Wishbone Ash on their second album Pilgrimage. A live version exists from a BBC recording and can be seen on YouTube.

== Track listing ==
All compositions by Jack McDuff except as indicated

1. "Blues 1 & 8" - 7:06
2. "Passing Through" (Charles Lloyd) - 2:39
3. "Dink's Blues" - 6:19
4. "Grease Monkey" - 2:32
5. "Vas Dis" - 8:09
6. "Somewhere in the Night" (Billy May) - 3:55
7. "Jive Samba" (Nat Adderley) - 6:50

== Personnel ==
- Jack McDuff - organ
- Red Holloway - tenor saxophone, soprano saxophone
- Harold Vick - tenor saxophone, flute
- George Benson - guitar
- Joe Dukes - drums
