= Cookin' Together =

Studio album by Red Holloway with the Brother Jack McDuff Quartet
- Released: 1964
- Recorded: February 6, 1964; Los Angeles, California
- Genre: Jazz
- Label: Prestige; PR 7325
- Producer: Lew Futterman, Peter Paul

Red Holloway chronology
The Burner (1963)	Cookin' Together (1964)	Sax, Strings & Soul (1964)

Brother Jack McDuff chronology
Prelude (1963)	Cookin' Together (1964)	The Dynamic Jack McDuff (1964)

Cookin' Together' is an album by saxophonist Red Holloway with organist Brother Jack McDuff's Quartet recorded in 1964 and released on the Prestige label.

== Reception ==
Professional ratings
Review scores
Source	Rating
Allmusic	4.5/5 stars
The Rolling Stone Jazz Record Guide	3/5 stars

Allmusic awarded the album 4½ stars stating "The material is comprised of Burt Bacharach's "Wives and Lovers," "This Can't Be Love," and five Holloway originals, which have more diversity than one might expect. An interesting aspect to the soulful and swinging set is that McDuff made his debut on piano for two songs".

== Track listing ==
All compositions by Red Holloway except where noted.

1. "Wives and Lovers" (Burt Bacharach, Hal David) - 8:07
2. "This Can't Be Love" (Lorenz Hart, Richard Rodgers) - 5:29
3. "Something Funny" - 7:11
4. "Brother Red" - 3:31
5. "Denise" - 6:31
6. "No Tears" - 8:02
7. "Shout Brother" - 4:32

== Personnel ==
- Red Holloway – tenor saxophone
- Brother Jack McDuff – organ, piano
- George Benson – guitar
- Wilfred Middlebrooks – bass
- Joe Dukes – drums
