= Tobacco Road (Jack McDuff album) =

Studio album by Jack McDuff
- Released: 1966
- Recorded: August 22 & 23, 1966
- Studio: Chess Studios, Chicago, Illinois
- Genre: Soul jazz
- Length: 34:00
- Label: Atlantic; 1472
- Producer: Lew Futterman

Jack McDuff chronology
A Change Is Gonna Come (1966)	Tobacco Road (1966)	Do It Now! (1966-67)

Professional ratings
Review scores
Source	Rating
Allmusic	4/5 stars

Tobacco Road is a 1966 album by organist Brother Jack McDuff which was his second release on the Atlantic label.

== Reception ==
Allmusic awarded the album 4 stars stating "Tobacco Road stands out from the pack... no matter what format, the tunes are given fantastically funked-up treatments that sound surprisingly natural".

== Track listing ==
All compositions by Jack McDuff except as indicated

1. "Teardrops from My Eyes" (Rudy Toombs) - 2:04
2. "Tobacco Road" (John D. Loudermilk) - 2:56
3. "The Shadow of Your Smile" (Johnny Mandel, Paul Francis Webster) - 3:52
4. "Can't Get Satisfied" - 5:11
5. "Blowin' in the Wind" (Bob Dylan) - 2:39
6. "And the Angels Sing" (Ziggy Elman, Johnny Mercer) - 4:11
7. "This Bitter Earth" (Clyde Otis) - 2:36
8. "Alexander's Ragtime Band" (Irving Berlin) - 5:55
9. "Wade in the Water" - 4:36
- Recorded at Chess Studios in Chicago on August 22 (tracks 1, 2, 5 & 7) and August 23 (tracks 3, 4, 6, 8 & 9), 1966.

== Personnel ==
- Jack McDuff - organ, arranger
- Fred Berry, King Kolax - trumpet (tracks 1, 2, 5 & 7)
- John Watson - trombone (tracks 1, 2, 5 & 7)
- Red Holloway - tenor saxophone (tracks 1, 2, 5 & 7)
- Danny Turner - tenor saxophone, flute (tracks 3, 4, 6, 8 & 9)
- Lonnie Simmons - baritone saxophone (tracks 1, 2, 5 & 7)
- Bobby Christian - vibraphone, percussion (tracks 1, 2, 5 & 7)
- Roland Faulkner (tracks 1, 2, 5 & 7), Calvin Green (tracks 3, 4, 6, 8 & 9) - guitar
- Loyal J. Gresham - electric bass (tracks 1, 2, 5 & 7)
- Joe Dukes (tracks 3, 4, 6, 8 & 9), Bob Guthrie (tracks 1, 2, 5 & 7) - drums
- J. J. Jackson - arranger, conductor (tracks 1, 2, 5 & 7)
