= Walk On By (album) =

Studio album by Jack McDuff
- Released: 1966
- Recorded: February 1966; New York City
- Genre: Soul jazz
- Length: 32:03
- Label: Prestige; PR 7476
- Producer: Lew Futterman

Jack McDuff chronology
Hot Barbeque (1965)	Walk On By (1966)	Hallelujah Time! (1964-66)

Professional ratings
Review scores
Source	Rating
Allmusic	3/5 stars

Walk On By is an album by organist Jack McDuff recorded in 1966 and released on the Prestige label.

== Reception ==
Allmusic rated the album with three stars out of five.

== Track listing ==
All compositions by Jack McDuff except as indicated

1. "Walk On By" (Burt Bacharach, Hal David) - 2:38
2. "Around the Corner" - 6:44
3. "Haitian Lady" (Harold Ousley) - 5:43
4. "Talkin' 'Bout My Woman" (Sidney Barnes, J. J. Jackson) - 2:15
5. "Jersey Bounce" (Tiny Bradshaw, Eddie Johnson, Bobby Plater, Buddy Feyne) - 2:30
6. "For Those Who Choose" (Ousley) - 4:09
7. "Too Many Fish in the Sea" (Eddie Holland, Norman Whitfield) - 2:17
8. "There Is No Greater Love" (Isham Jones, Marty Symes) - 5:16
9. "Song of the Soul" (Ousley) - 4:16

== Personnel ==
- Jack McDuff - organ
- Red Holloway (tracks 2 & 8), Harold Ousley (tracks 3, 6 & 9) - tenor saxophone
- Pat Martino - guitar
- Joe Dukes - drums
- Unidentified orchestra arranged and conducted by Benny Golson (tracks 1, 4, 5 & 8)
