= The Natural Thing (album) =

Studio album by Jack McDuff
- Released: 1968
- Recorded: April 1968
- Studio: Ter Mar Studios, Chicago, Illinois
- Genre: Jazz
- Length: 37:27
- Label: Cadet; LPS 812
- Producer: Lew Futterman

Jack McDuff chronology
Double Barrelled Soul (1967)	The Natural Thing (1968)	Getting Our Thing Together (1968)

Professional ratings
Review scores
Source	Rating
Allmusic	3.5/5 stars
The Rolling Stone Jazz Record Guide	2/5 stars

The Natural Thing is a 1968 album by organist Brother Jack McDuff which was his first release on the Cadet label.

== Reception ==
Al Campbell in his review for Allmusic states, "this isn't one of McDuff's strongest dates, but it does contain enjoyable moments".

== Track listing ==
All compositions by Jack McDuff except as indicated

1. "Let My People Go" (Richard Evans, Jack McDuff) - 3:51
2. "Who Stole My Soul?" (Evans, Cleveland Eaton, Louis Satterfield) - 3:30
3. "L. David Sloan" (Angela Martin, Billy Meshel) - 3:37
4. "Funky Guru" - 3:16
5. "Ain't It?" (Evans) - 3:00
6. "The Natural Thing" - 6:16
7. "Run on Home" - 5:33
8. "Con Alma" (Dizzy Gillespie) - 3:35
9. "Rock Candy" - 4:49

== Personnel ==
- Brother Jack McDuff - organ
- Cliff Davis - flute, alto saxophone, tenor saxophone
- Roland Faulkner, Phil Upchurch - guitar
- Morris Jennings, James Slaughter, Marshall Thompson - drums
- unidentified brass arranged and conducted by Richard Evans (tracks 1–3, 5 & 6)
