= Soul Circle =

Studio album by Jack McDuff
- Released: 1968
- Recorded: July 1964, late 1965 and February 1966; New York City
- Genre: Soul jazz
- Label: Prestige; PR 7567
- Producer: Lew Futterman

Jack McDuff chronology
The Midnight Sun (1963-66)	Soul Circle (1968)	I Got a Woman (1964-66)

Professional ratings
Review scores
Source	Rating
Allmusic	3/5 stars

Soul Circle is an album by organist Jack McDuff recorded between 1964 and 1966 and released on the Prestige label.

== Reception ==
Allmusic awarded the album 3 stars.

== Track listing ==
All compositions by Jack McDuff except as indicated

1. "More" (Riz Ortolani, Nino Oliviero) - 6:28
2. "Lew's Piece" - 8:20
3. "You'd Be So Easy to Love" (Cole Porter) - 4:50
4. "That's When We Thought of Love" (Harold Ousley) - 4:22
5. "Opus de Funk" (Horace Silver) - 6:55

== Personnel ==
- Jack McDuff - organ
- Red Holloway (tracks 2 & 5), Harold Ousley (tracks 1 & 4), Harold Vick (track 3) - tenor saxophone
- George Benson (tracks 2 & 5), Pat Martino (track 1 & 4), Eddie Diehl (track 3) - guitar
- Joe Dukes - drums
