= Sax, Strings & Soul =

Studio album by Red Holloway
- Released: 1964
- Recorded: August 1964; Stockholm, Sweden
- Genre: Jazz
- Label: Prestige; PR 7390
- Producer: Lew Futterman

Red Holloway chronology
Cookin' Together (1964)	Sax, Strings & Soul (1964)	Red Soul (1965)

Sax, Strings & Soul is an album by saxophonist Red Holloway recorded in Europe in 1964 and released on the Prestige label.

== Reception ==
Professional ratings
Review scores
Source	Rating
Allmusic	3/5 stars

Allmusic awarded the album 3 stars.

== Track listing ==
1. "When Irish Eyes Are Smiling" (Chauncey Olcott, George Graff, Jr., Ernest Ball) - 4:07
2. "Bossa in Blue" - 3:05
3. "Where Have All the Flowers Gone?" (Pete Seeger, Joe Hickerson) - 3:14
4. "Nights With Lora" - 3:44
5. "If I Had a Hammer" (Seeger, Lee Hays) - 3:40
6. "I Wish You Love" (Léo Chauliac, Charles Trenet) - 4:28
7. "Star of David" (Mason) - 4:15
8. "The Girls in the Park" (Wallin) - 3:15

== Personnel ==
- Red Holloway - tenor saxophone
- Unnamed Orchestra arranged and conducted by Benny Golson
