= The Dynamic Jack McDuff =

Studio album by Jack McDuff
- Released: 1964
- Recorded: February 6 & 7 and April 23, 1964; Los Angeles, California and New York City
- Genre: Soul jazz
- Label: Prestige; PR 7323
- Producer: Lew Futterman

Jack McDuff chronology
Cookin' Together (1964)	The Dynamic Jack McDuff (1964)	The Concert McDuff (1964)

Professional ratings
Review scores
Source	Rating
Allmusic	3/5 stars

The Dynamic Jack McDuff is an album by organist Jack McDuff recorded in 1964 and released on the Prestige label.

== Reception ==
Allmusic awarded the album 3 stars.

== Track listing ==
All compositions by Jack McDuff except as indicated

1. "The Main Theme from the Paramount Picture The Carpetbaggers" (Elmer Bernstein) - 3:14
2. "You Better Love Me" (Hugh Martin, Timothy Gray) - 4:34
3. "Once in a Lifetime" (Leslie Bricusse, Anthony Newley) - 5:31
4. "The Theme from The Pink Panther" (Henry Mancini) - 5:15
5. "Rail Head" - 6:07
6. "What's New?" (Bob Haggart, Johnny Burke) - 7:20
7. "Bossa Nova West" - 5:50
- Recorded in Los Angeles, California on February 6 & 7, 1964 (tracks 5–7) and in New York City on April 23, 1964 (tracks 1–4)

== Personnel ==
- Jack McDuff - organ
- Red Holloway - tenor saxophone
- George Benson - guitar
- Joe Dukes - drums
- Unidentified orchestra arranged and conducted by Benny Golson (tracks 1–4)
