= Double Barrelled Soul =

Studio album by Brother Jack McDuff and David Newman
- Released: 1967
- Recorded: August 8 & 9, 1967; New York City
- Genre: Soul jazz
- Length: 36:26
- Label: Atlantic; 1498
- Producer: Lew Futterman, Joel Dorn

Jack McDuff chronology
Do It Now! (1967)	Double Barrelled Soul (1967)	The Natural Thing (1968)

David Newman chronology
House of David (1967)	Double Barrelled Soul (1967)	Bigger & Better (1967)

Professional ratings
Review scores
Source	Rating
Allmusic	3/5 stars

Double Barrelled Soul is a 1967 album by American organist Brother Jack McDuff and American saxophonist David Newman which was released on the Atlantic label.

== Reception ==
The Allmusic site awarded the album 3 stars.

== Track listing ==
All compositions by David Newman except as indicated

1. "But It's Alright" (J. J. Jackson, Pierre Tubbs) - 6:00
2. "Sunny" (Bobby Hebb) - 6:30
3. "Esperanto" (Jack McDuff, Billy Meshel) - 4:46
4. "Duffin' 'Round" - 5:05
5. "More Head" - 4:32
6. "Untitled Blues" (McDuff) - 9:21
- Recorded in New York City on August 8, 1967 (track 4) and August 9, 1967 (tracks 1–3, 5 & 6).

== Personnel ==
- Jack McDuff - organ
- David Newman, Danny Turner - alto saxophone, tenor saxophone, flute
- Leo Johnson - tenor saxophone, flute
- Melvin Sparks - guitar
- Abe Blassingame - drums
