= Gin and Orange =

Live album by Jack McDuff
- Released: 1969, 2007 (reissue)
- Recorded: April 1969
- Venues: Ter Mar Studios and The London House, Chicago, Illinois
- Genre: Jazz
- Labels: Cadet; LPS 831 Dusty Groove (reissue); DGA 3017
- Producer: Lew Futterman

Jack McDuff chronology
Getting Our Thing Together (1968)	Gin and Orange (1969)	Down Home Style (1969)

Professional ratings
Review scores
Source	Rating
Allmusic	4/5 stars

Gin and Orange is a 1969 album by organist Brother Jack McDuff recorded both live and in the studio which was his third release on the Cadet label.

== Reception ==
Rovi in his review for Allmusic states, "GIN features a slightly higher quotient of electric guitar than usual and--something unique for most jazz organ sessions--the super-funky electric bass of Phil Upchurch. With BBQ-rich arrangements by Richard Evans, the result is a heavier sound that McDuff none-the-less cuts through like crazy".

== Track listing ==
All compositions by Jack McDuff except as indicated

1. "Mac-Duffin" (Richard Evans, Jack McDuff) - 3:03
2. "The Electric Surfboard" - 5:02
3. "On the Case" (Evans) - 2:59
4. "Channel One" - 5:56
5. "Get It Up" (Evans) - 3:02
6. "Gin and Orange" - 4:19
7. "Beep-Bo-Boo" - 7:22
8. "With the Wind" (Clara Edwards, Jack Lawrence) - 6:46
- Recorded at Ter Mar Studios (tracks 1, 3 & 5) and The London House (tracks 2, 4 & 6–8), Chicago, Illinois in April 1969

== Personnel ==
- Brother Jack McDuff - organ
- Gene Barge - alto saxophone (tracks 1, 3 & 5)
- Ben Branch (tracks 1, 3 & 5), Cliff Davis (tracks 2, 4 & 6–8), Billy Phipps (tracks 2, 4 & 6–8) - tenor saxophone
- Cash McCall (tracks 1, 3 & 5), Jerry Byrd (tracks 2, 4 & 6–8) - guitar
- Phil Upchurch - electric bass (tracks 1, 3 & 5)
- Morris Jennings (tracks 1, 3 & 5), Joe Burkes (tracks 2, 4 & 6–8) - drums
- Richard Powell - percussion (tracks 1, 3 & 5)
