= Commitment (Harold Vick album) =

Studio album by Harold Vick
- Released: 1974
- Recorded: May 1–2, 1967 in NYC
- Genre: Jazz
- Label: Muse MR 5054
- Producer: Fred Norsworthy

Harold Vick chronology
Straight Up (1966)	Commitment (1974)	Watch What Happens (1967)

Commitment is an album led by American saxophonist Harold Vick recorded in 1967 but not released on the Muse label until 1974.

== Reception ==
Allmusic awarded the album 3 stars.

Professional ratings
Review scores
Source	Rating
Allmusic	3/5 stars

== Track listing ==
All compositions by Harold Vick except as indicated

1. "Commitment" - 5:10
2. "H.N.I.C. - 5:00
3. "A Time and a Place" (Jimmy Heath) - 6:10
4. "Out of It" - 5:30
5. "Wild Is the Wind" (Dimitri Tiomkin, Ned Washington) - 4:18
6. "Blue Gardenia" (Bob Russell, Lester Lee) - 4:24
7. "From Within" - 4:48

== Personnel ==
- Harold Vick - tenor saxophone, soprano saxophone, flute
- Victor Feldman - vibraphone, piano
- Walter Bishop - piano
- Malcolm Riddick - guitar
- Herb Bushler, Ben Tucker - bass
- Mickey Roker - drums
