= Silk and Soul =

Studio album by Jack McDuff
- Released: 1965
- Recorded: July 1964 and 1965; New York City and Stockholm, Sweden
- Genre: Soul jazz
- Label: Prestige; PR 7404
- Producer: Lew Futterman

Jack McDuff chronology
The Concert McDuff (1964)	Silk and Soul (1965)	Hot Barbeque (1965)

Silk and Soul is an album by organist Jack McDuff recorded in 1964 and 1965 and released on the Prestige label.

== Track listing ==
All compositions by Jack McDuff except as indicated

1. "Silk and Soul" - 8:02
2. "If Ever I Would Leave You" (Alan Jay Lerner, Frederick Loewe) - 4:17
3. "What's Shakin'?" - 2:44
4. "The Morning Song" - 5:49
5. "Hey Lawdy Mama" (Buddy Moss) - 4:04
6. "Scufflin'" - 4:53
7. "From the Bottom Up" (Benny Golson) - 3:47
8. "Lexington Line" - 3:26
- Recorded in Stockholm, Sweden in July 1964 (tracks 2, 5, 7 & 8) and in New York City in July 1964 (track 6) and 1965 (tracks 1, 3 & 4)

== Personnel ==
- Jack McDuff - organ
- Red Holloway - tenor saxophone, flute
- George Benson - guitar
- Larry Gales - bass (tracks 1 & 4)
- Joe Dukes - drums
- Montego Joe - congas (track 3)
- Unidentified orchestra arranged and conducted by Benny Golson (tracks 2, 5, 7 & 8)
