= The Burner =

Studio album by Red Holloway
- Released: 1963
- Recorded: August 27 and October 10, 1963
- Studio: Van Gelder Studio, Englewood Cliffs, New Jersey
- Genre: Jazz
- Label: Prestige; PR 7299
- Producer: Ozzie Cadena

Red Holloway chronology
The Burner (1963)	Cookin' Together (1964)

The Burner is an album by saxophonist Red Holloway recorded in 1963 and released on the Prestige label.

== Reception ==
Professional ratings
Review scores
Source	Rating
Allmusic	3/5 stars

Allmusic awarded the album 3 stars stating simply "Early date with Holloway and John Patton (or George Butcher) on Hammond organ".

== Track listing ==
All compositions by Red Holloway except where noted.

1. "Monkey Sho' Can Talk" – 3:36
2. "Brethren" – 5:05
3. "Crib Theme" (Ozzie Cadena) – 10:13
4. "The Burner" – 10:36
5. "Miss Judie Mae" – 3:13
6. "Moonlight in Vermont" (John Blackburn, Karl Suessdorf) – 6:00
- Recorded at Van Gelder Studio on August 27 (track 6) and October 10 (tracks 1–5), 1963

== Personnel ==
- Red Holloway – tenor saxophone
- Paul Serrano (tracks 1–5), Hobart Dotson (track 6) – trumpet
- "Big" John Patton (tracks 1–5), George Butcher (track 6) – organ
- Eric Gale (tracks 1–5), Charles Lindsay (track 6) – guitar
- Leonard Gaskin (tracks 1–5), Thomas Palmer (track 6) – bass
- Herbie Lovelle (tracks 1–5), Bobby Durham (track 6) – drums
