= Brother Jack Meets the Boss =

Studio album by Jack McDuff and Gene Ammons
- Released: 1962
- Recorded: January 23, 1962
- Studio: Van Gelder, Englewood Cliffs, New Jersey
- Genre: Jazz
- Length: 36:53
- Label: Prestige; PR 7228
- Producer: Esmond Edwards

Gene Ammons chronology
Twisting the Jug (1961)	Brother Jack Meets the Boss (1962)	Boss Tenors in Orbit! (1962)

Jack McDuff chronology
On With It! (1961)	Brother Jack Meets the Boss (1962)	Stitt Meets Brother Jack (1962)

Brother Jack Meets the Boss is an album by the organist Jack McDuff and the saxophonist Gene Ammons recorded in 1962 and released on the Prestige label.

== Recording and music ==
The album was recorded at the Van Gelder Studio, Englewood Cliffs, New Jersey, on January 23, 1962. Although billed as a meeting of organist Jack McDuff and tenor saxophonist Gene Ammons, a second tenorist, Harold Vick, played on all of the tracks, as did guitarist Eddie Diehl and drummer Joe Dukes.

Three of the six tracks were written by McDuff; the first, "Watch Out", is an uptempo blues.

== Reception ==
Professional ratings
Review scores
Source	Rating
Down Beat	3/5 stars
Allmusic	4/5 stars

The Allmusic review by Scott Yanow stated "this is a very successful soul-jazz/hard bop outing... Ammons, whose every note was always full of passion, fits in perfectly with McDuff's group". Marc Myers described the recording as "a superb bluesy album".

== Track listing ==
All compositions by Jack McDuff except where noted.

1. "Watch Out" – 5:08
2. "Strollin'" (Horace Silver) – 6:14
3. "Mellow Gravy" – 5:00
4. "Christopher Columbus" (Chu Berry, Andy Razaf) – 6:22
5. "Buzzin' Round" (Michael Edwards, Jack McDuff) – 6:12
6. "Mr. Clean" (Eddie "Cleanhead" Vinson) – 7:57

== Personnel ==
- Gene Ammons – tenor saxophone
- Jack McDuff – organ
- Harold Vick – tenor saxophone
- Eddie Diehl – guitar
- Joe Dukes – drums
