= To Seek a New Home =

Studio album by Brother Jack McDuff
- Released: 1970
- Recorded: March 23–26, 1970
- Genre: Jazz
- Length: 33:12
- Label: Blue Note

Brother Jack McDuff chronology
Moon Rappin' (1969)	To Seek a New Home (1970)	Who Knows What Tomorrow's Gonna Bring? (1970)

To Seek a New Home is an album by American organist Brother Jack McDuff recorded in England in 1970 and released on the Blue Note label.

== Reception ==
The Allmusic review awarded the album 3 stars.

Professional ratings
Review scores
Source	Rating
Allmusic	3/5 stars

== Track listing ==
All compositions by Jack McDuff except as indicated

1. "Yellow Wednesday" – 6:35
2. "Come and Carry Me Home" – 4:48
3. "Mystic John" – 5:11
4. "Hunk O' Funk" (J.J. Jackson, McDuff) – 6:20
5. "Seven Keys for Seven Doors" – 10:18

- Recorded at Island Studios, London, England on March 23 (track 2), March 24 (track 3), March 25 (track 5), and March 26 (tracks 1 & 4), 1970.

== Personnel ==
- Brother Jack McDuff – organ, piano
- Martin Drover, Terry Noonan, Bud Parks – trumpet
- John Bennett, Adrian Drover – trombone
- David Statham, Willie Watson – French horn
- Norman Leppard, Dick Morrissey, Jack Whitford, Dave Willis – reeds
- Typhena Partridge – harp
- J.J. Jackson – piano, percussion
- Chris Parren – electric piano
- Terry Smith – guitar
- Peter Chapman, Larry Steele – electric bass
- Trevor Armstrong, Phil Leaford – drums
- Debrah Long, Jerry Long – vocals
