= Don't Look Back (Harold Vick album) =

Studio album by Harold Vick
- Released: 1974
- Recorded: November 1974
- Studio: Minot Sound Studios, White Plains, NY
- Genre: Jazz
- Label: Strata-East SES 7431
- Producer: Harold Vick

Harold Vick chronology
The Power of Feeling (1973)	Don't Look Back (1974)	After the Dance (1977)

Professional ratings
Review scores
Source	Rating
AllMusic	3/5 stars

Don't Look Back is an album led by American saxophonist Harold Vick recorded in 1974 and released on the Strata-East label.

== Track listing ==
All compositions by Harold Vick.

1. "Don't Look Back" - 5:59
2. "Melody for Bu" - 7:21
3. "Senor Zamora" - 5:38
4. "Stop and Cop" - 6:34
5. "Lucille" - 9:20
6. "Prayer" - 0:56

== Personnel ==
- Harold Vick - tenor saxophone, soprano saxophone, flute, bass clarinet
- Virgil Jones - trumpet, flugelhorn (tracks 1–3)
- Kiane Zawadi - euphonium (tracks 1–3)
- Joe Bonner - electric piano, piano, percussion, tuba
- George Davis - guitar, flute (tracks 1–4)
- Sam Jones - bass (tracks 1–5)
- Billy Hart - drums, percussion (tracks 1–5)
- Jimmy Hopps - percussion (track 4)
