= Winston Walls =

American jazz musician

Winston Walls (October 17, 1942 Ironton, Ohio – February 5, 2008 Fort Myers, Florida) was an American jazz musician who played the Hammond B3 organ.

== Career ==
His father was Harry Van Walls, who played piano for Big Joe Turner. He grew up in Charleston, West Virginia and played drums and piano in his teens. He was hired by Bill Doggett as a drummer, but during breaks he replaced Doggett on organ and built his career as a keyboardist. He worked with George Benson, Lou Donaldson, Al Green, Brother Jack McDuff, Pointer Sisters, Charley Pride, Sonny Stitt, Ike & Tina Turner, and Dionne Warwick. Schoolkids Records released his first album, Boss of the B-3. In 2023, Winston was inducted into the West Virginia Music Hall of Fame with a warm introduction by George Benson. Benson fondly recalled playing with Winston in his early days as a jazz guitarist.
