= Tough 'Duff =

Studio album by Jack McDuff with Jimmy Forrest
- Released: 1960
- Recorded: July 12, 1960
- Studio: Van Gelder Studio, Englewood Cliffs, New Jersey
- Genre: Jazz
- Length: 38:49
- Label: Prestige; PR 7185

Jack McDuff chronology
Brother Jack (1960)	Tough 'Duff (1960)	The Honeydripper (1961)

Tough 'Duff is the second album by organist Jack McDuff recorded in 1960 and released on the Prestige label.

== Reception ==
Professional ratings
Review scores
Source	Rating
Allmusic	4.5/5 stars

Scott Yanow of Allmusic states, "although no real surprises occur, the results are typically swingin' and groovin'".

== Track listing ==
All compositions by Jack McDuff except as indicated

1. "Smooth Sailing" (Arnett Cobb) - 6:45
2. "Mean to Me" (Fred E. Ahlert, Roy Turk) - 5:38
3. "Tippin' In" (Bobby Smith, Marty Symes) - 5:22
4. "Yeah, Baby" - 8:52
5. "Autumn Leaves" (Joseph Kosma, Johnny Mercer, Jacques Prévert) - 5:12
6. "Tough 'Duff" - 7:00

== Personnel ==
- Jack McDuff - organ
- Jimmy Forrest - tenor saxophone
- Lem Winchester - vibraphone
- Bill Elliot - drums
