= I Got a Woman (album) =

Studio album by Jack McDuff
- Released: 1969
- Recorded: July 1964, late 1965 and February 1966; New Jersey and New York City
- Genre: Soul jazz
- Label: Prestige; PR 7642
- Producer: Lew Futterman

Jack McDuff chronology
Soul Circle (1964-66)	I Got a Woman (1969)	A Change Is Gonna Come (1966)

Professional ratings
Review scores
Source	Rating
Allmusic	3/5 stars

I Got a Woman is an album by organist Jack McDuff recorded between 1964 and 1966 and released on the Prestige label.

== Reception ==
Allmusic awarded the album 3 stars.

== Track listing ==
All compositions by Jack McDuff except as indicated

1. "How High the Moon" (Nancy Hamilton, Morgan Lewis) - 5:40
2. "English Country Gardens" (Traditional) - 4:20
3. "Spoonin'" - 6:00
4. "I Got a Woman" (Ray Charles, Renald Richard) - 8:30
5. "Twelve Inches Wide" - 8:00

== Personnel ==
- Jack McDuff - organ
- Red Holloway (tracks 2–5), Harold Ousley (track 1) - tenor saxophone
- George Benson (tracks 2, 4 & 5), Pat Martino (tracks 1 & 3) - guitar
- Joe Dukes - drums
- Montego Joe - congas (track 5)
- Big band arranged and conducted by Benny Golson (track 2)
