= Crash! (album) =

Studio album by Kenny Burrell with the Brother Jack McDuff Quartet
- Released: 1963
- Recorded: January 8 and February 26, 1963
- Studio: Van Gelder Studio, Englewood Cliffs, New Jersey
- Genre: Jazz
- Label: Prestige; PR 7347
- Producer: Ozzie Cadena

Kenny Burrell chronology
Midnight Blue (1963)	Crash! (1963)	Lotsa Bossa Nova (1963)

Brother Jack McDuff chronology
Somethin' Slick! (1963)	Crash! (1963)	Brother Jack McDuff Live! (1963)

Crash! is an album by guitarist Kenny Burrell with organist Brother Jack McDuff's Quartet recorded in 1963 and released on the Prestige label.

== Reception ==
Professional ratings
Review scores
Source	Rating
Allmusic	4.5/5 stars
The Rolling Stone Jazz Record Guide	3/5 stars

Allmusic awarded the album 4½ stars stating it is "easily recommended to fans of the jazz organ".

== Track listing ==
1. "Grease Monkey" (Jack McDuff) – 3:15
2. "The Breeze and I" (Ernesto Lecuona, Al Stillman) – 7:26
3. "Call It Stormy Monday" (T-Bone Walker) – 4:34
4. "Nica's Dream" (Horace Silver) – 7:58
5. "Love Walked In" (George Gershwin, Ira Gershwin) – 4:58
6. "We'll Be Together Again" (Carl T. Fischer, Frankie Laine) – 3:16

Note

- Recorded at Van Gelder Studio in Englewood Cliffs, New Jersey on January 8, 1963 (track 5) and February 26, 1963 (tracks 1–4 & 6)

== Personnel ==
- Kenny Burrell – guitar
- Brother Jack McDuff – organ
- Harold Vick – tenor saxophone (tracks 1, 2, 4 & 5)
- Eric Dixon – flute (track 5)
- Joe Dukes – drums
- Ray Barretto – percussion (tracks 1, 2, 4 & 5)
