= The Fourth Dimension (Jack McDuff album) =

Studio album by Jack McDuff
- Released: 1974
- Recorded: 1973–74; New York City
- Genre: Jazz
- Label: Cadet; CA 50051
- Producer: Esmond Edwards

Jack McDuff chronology
| Check This Out (1972) | The Fourth Dimension (1974) | Magnetic Feel (1975) |

The Fourth Dimension is an album by organist Jack McDuff recorded in 1973–74 and released on the Cadet label.

== Track listing ==
All compositions by Jack McDuff except as indicated

1. "Layin' Back" – 6:45
2. "Rolling Stone" (Oliver Sain) – 4:37
3. "The Fourth Dimension" 4:20
4. "Half Breed" (Mary Dean, Al Capps) – 4:08
5. "The City Bump" – 7:38
6. "All Is Fair in Love" (Stevie Wonder) – 6:25
7. "Show Casing" – 6:10

== Personnel ==
- Jack McDuff – organ, electric piano, clavinet, piano
- Joe Newman, Richard Williams, Jon Faddis – trumpet
- Garnett Brown – trombone
- Harold Vick – tenor saxophone (solo on track 1)
- Joe Farrell – tenor saxophone, flute (solo on track 6)
- Seldon Powell, Babe Clark – baritone saxophone
- Pee Wee Ellis – soprano saxophone, tenor saxophone (solo on track 3), flute (solo on track 5)
- Joe Beck, Eric Johnson, Jimmy Ponder – guitar
- Wilbur Bascomb, Gordon Edwards – electric bass
- Grady Tate – drums, congas
- Norman Pride – congas
- Jean DuShon – vocals
