= Hot Barbeque =

Studio album by Jack McDuff
- Released: 1966
- Recorded: October 19, 1965; New York City
- Genre: Soul jazz
- Length: 32:03
- Label: Prestige; PR 7422
- Producer: Peter Paul

Jack McDuff chronology
Silk and Soul (1965)	Hot Barbeque (1966)	Walk On By (1966)

Professional ratings
Review scores
Source	Rating
Allmusic	3.5/5 stars
The Rolling Stone Jazz Record Guide	3/5 stars

Hot Barbeque is an album by organist Jack McDuff recorded in 1965 and released on the Prestige label.

== Reception ==
Allmusic awarded the album 3½ stars stating "McDuff had an excellent quartet for this mid-1960s soul-jazz outing... Nothing remarkable, just very enjoyable, high-spirited genre music".

== Track listing ==
All compositions by Jack McDuff except as indicated

1. "Hot Barbeque" - 3:01
2. "The Party's Over" (Betty Comden, Adolph Green, Jule Styne) - 6:53
3. "Briar Patch" - 2:55
4. "Hippy Dip" - 6:30
5. "601½ North Poplar" - 4:17
6. "Cry Me a River" (Arthur Hamilton) - 4:50
7. "The Three Day Thang" - 3:37

== Personnel ==
- Jack McDuff - organ
- Red Holloway - tenor saxophone
- George Benson - guitar
- Joe Dukes - drums
