= Soul Summit Vol. 2 =

Studio album by Gene Ammons with Etta Jones and Jack McDuff
- Released: 1963
- Recorded: June 13 and December 1, 1961, January 23 and April 13, 1962
- Studio: Van Gelder Studio, Englewood Cliffs, NJ
- Genre: Jazz
- Length: 40:19
- Label: Prestige; PR 7275
- Producer: Esmond Edwards

Gene Ammons chronology
Soul Summit (1962)	Soul Summit Vol. 2 (1963)	Late Hour Special (1961–62)

Jack McDuff chronology
Soul Summit (1962)	Soul Summit Vol. 2 (1962)	Screamin' (1962)

Professional ratings
Review scores
Source	Rating
Allmusic	3/5 stars

Soul Summit Vol 2 is an album by saxophonist Gene Ammons with vocalist Etta Jones and organist Jack McDuff recorded in 1961 and 1962 and released on the Prestige label.

== Reception ==
The Allmusic review stated "Some of the first records Prestige released after Gene Ammons' incarceration were Soul Summit and Soul Summit, Vol. 2, two albums whose slapdash nature was partially hidden by their presentation as all-star jam sessions. The tunes, recorded in four sessions in 1961 and 1962, are a widely varied lot in terms of material, arrangements, and accompanists... Like most of the Prestige albums of this period, Soul Summit, Vol. 2 is uneven, but it contains enough gems to make it worthwhile".

== Track listing ==
1. "Love, I've Found You" (Gwen Fuqua, Harvey Fuqua) – 5:05
2. "But Not for Me" (George Gershwin, Ira Gershwin) – 4:24
3. "Too Marvelous for Words" (Johnny Mercer, Richard A. Whiting) – 3:50
4. "If You Are But a Dream" (Nat Bonx, Jack Fulton, Moe Jaffe) – 4:25
5. "Scram" (Leonard Feather) – 7:35
6. "Ballad for Baby" (Jack McDuff) – 6:10
7. "Cool, Cool Daddy" (Traditional) – 4:50
- Recorded at Van Gelder Studio in Englewood Cliffs, New Jersey on June 13, 1961 (tracks 1 & 3), December 1, 1961 (track 6), January 23, 1962 (track 5) and April 13, 1962 (tracks 2, 4 & 7)

== Personnel ==
- Gene Ammons – tenor saxophone (tracks 1–4, 6 & 7)
- Hobart Dotson, Clark Terry – trumpet (tracks 1 & 3)
- Oliver Nelson – alto saxophone, arranger (tracks 1 & 3)
- George Barrow (tracks 1 & 3), Red Holloway (tracks 1 & 3), Harold Vick (track 5 & 6) – tenor saxophone
- Bob Ashton – baritone saxophone (tracks 1 & 3)
- Patti Bown (tracks 2, 4 & 7), Richard Wyands (tracks 1 & 3) – piano
- Jack McDuff – organ (tracks 5 & 6)
- Eddie Diehl – guitar (tracks 5 & 6)
- George Duvivier (tracks 2, 4 & 7), Wendell Marshall (tracks 1 & 3) – bass
- Joe Dukes (tracks 5 & 6), Bill English (tracks 1 & 3), Walter Perkins (tracks 2, 4 & 7) – drums
- Ray Barretto – congas (tracks 1 & 3)
- Etta Jones – vocals (tracks 2, 4 & 7)
