= The Honeydripper (Jack McDuff album) =

Studio album by Jack McDuff
- Released: 1961
- Recorded: February 3, 1961
- Studio: Van Gelder Studio, Englewood Cliffs, New Jersey
- Genre: Jazz
- Length: 37:30
- Label: Prestige; PR 7199
- Producer: Esmond Edwards

Jack McDuff chronology
Tough 'Duff (1960)	The Honeydripper (1961)	Goodnight, It's Time to Go (1961)

The Honeydripper is the third album by American organist Jack McDuff, recorded in 1961 and released on the Prestige label. Guitarist Grant Green, who previously recorded with Sam Lazar, is part of the line-up, as well as saxophonist Jimmy Forrest.

== Reception ==
Professional ratings
Review scores
Source	Rating
Allmusic	4/5 stars

Thom Jurek of Allmusic states, "This is an excellent date and should be picked up by anyone interested in McDuff as a great place to start".

== Track listing ==
All compositions by Jack McDuff except as indicated

1. "Whap!" – 4:26
2. "I Want a Little Girl" (Murray Mencher, Billy Moll) – 6:47
3. "The Honeydripper" (Joe Liggins) – 8:14
4. "Dink's Blues" – 7:59
5. "Mr. Lucky" (Henry Mancini) – 5:03
6. "Blues and Tonic" – 5:02

== Personnel ==
- Jack McDuff – organ
- Jimmy Forrest – tenor saxophone
- Grant Green – guitar
- Ben Dixon – drums
