= The Reentry =

Studio album by Jack McDuff
- Released: 1988
- Recorded: March 1988
- Genre: Jazz
- Label: Muse
- Producer: Houston Person

Jack McDuff chronology
| Lift Every Voice and Sing (1984) | The Reentry (1988) | Another Real Good 'Un (1990) |

The Reentry is an album by the American musician Jack McDuff, released in 1988. It was considered a comeback album.

== Production ==
Recorded in March 1988, the album was produced by Houston Person. McDuff was backed by Person and Ron Bridgewater on saxophone, Cecil Bridgewater on trumpet, Grady Tate on drums, and John Hart on guitar. "Laura" is a version of the David Raksin song. "Blues for 'Paign" is a tribute to McDuff's hometown of Champaign, Illinois.

== Critical reception ==
Professional ratings
Review scores
| Source | Rating |
|---|---|
| All Music Guide to Jazz | 4/5 stars |
| The Encyclopedia of Popular Music | 4/5 stars |
| The Grove Press Guide to the Blues on CD | 2.5/5 stars |
| The Penguin Guide to Jazz on CD | 3/4 stars |
| The Rolling Stone Jazz & Blues Album Guide | 3/5 stars |

The Commercial Appeal called McDuff "one of the genre's masters" of "soulful organ jazz".

All About Jazz said that "it's McDuff's blues themes that have the most flavor and excitement". The All Music Guide to Jazz noted that McDuff "proved to still be in his prime". Modern Drummer praised Tate's "flair for playing in small organ groups" on the "top-flight The Re-Entry." The Grove Press Guide to the Blues on CD said that "the griddle sizzles quietly with the soul-seasoned jazz and blues".

== Track listing ==
| No. | Title | Length |
|---|---|---|
| 1. | "Cap'n Jack" |
| 2. | "One Hundred Ways" |
| 3. | "Electric Surfboard" |
| 4. | "Walking the Dog" |
| 5. | "Blues for 'Paign" |
| 6. | "Laura" |
