= Contact! (Ray Barretto album) =

Studio album by Ray Barretto
- Released: 1998
- Label: Blue Note
- Producer: Ray Barretto

Ray Barretto chronology
My Summertime (1995)	Contact! (1998)	Portraits in Jazz and Clave (2000)

Contact! is an album by the American musician Ray Barretto, released in 1998. He is credited with his band, New World Spirit.

The album was nominated for a Grammy Award for "Best Latin Jazz Performance". Barretto supported the album by headlining the 1998 Latin Jazz Festival, in New York City. Barretto hated the most commonly used descriptor of his music: Latin jazz.

== Production ==
"Sister Sadie" is a version of the Horace Silver song. Michael Philip Mossman played trumpet and saxophone on the album; he also wrote "Moss Code".

== Critical reception ==
Professional ratings
Review scores
Source	Rating
AllMusic	3/5 stars
The Encyclopedia of Popular Music	4/5 stars
Los Angeles Daily News	3/4 stars
Ottawa Citizen	4/5 stars

The Philadelphia Inquirer deemed Contact! "a straight-ahead exercise that contains Latinate workovers of standards such as 'Poinciana' and 'Caravan'." The Ottawa Citizen wrote that "Barretto's band excels at tightly arranged, polyrhythmic music, but the jazz sensibility always prevails so that mood and immediacy win out over showing off what's been rehearsed." City Pages determined that New World Spirit "strut through a series of salsa-driven numbers that neatly balances the sax and trumpet in the front line with a redoubtable rhythm section."

Newsday called the album "a treasure of tasty moments... Even when the song selection gets hokey (another version of 'Poinciana'?), the level of his commitment remains high." The Columbia Daily Tribune labeled it "a top-shelf release," writing that "this is a high-octane brass-and percussion ensemble that doesn't quit." The Star Tribune praised the "tip-top, hard-jazz form."

AllMusic wrote: "Songs are masterfully syncretized and utilizing Baretto's unique musical vocabulary, including call-and-response, cubop rhythms and 4/4 swing."

== Track listing ==
No.	Title	Length
1.	"Moss Code"
2.	"Caravan"
3.	"Serenata"
4.	"Dance of Denial"
5.	"Poinciana"
6.	"Point of Contact/Punto de Contacto"
7.	"La Benedicion"
8.	"Liberated Spirit"
9.	"The Summer Knows"
10.	"Sister Sadie"
