= Screamin' =

Studio album by Jack McDuff
- Released: 1962
- Recorded: October 23, 1962
- Studio: Van Gelder Studio, Englewood Cliffs, New Jersey
- Genre: Jazz
- Length: 31:02
- Label: Prestige; PR 7259
- Producer: Ozzie Cadena

Jack McDuff chronology
Soul Summit Vol. 2 (1962)	Screamin' (1962)	Somethin' Slick! (1963)

Professional ratings
Review scores
Source	Rating
Allmusic	4/5 stars
The Rolling Stone Jazz Record Guide	3/5 stars

Screamin' is an album by organist Jack McDuff recorded in 1962 and released on the Prestige label.

== Reception ==
Allmusic awarded the album four stars calling it, "a spirited blues-oriented set".

== Track listing ==
All compositions by Jack McDuff except where noted

1. "He's a Real Gone Guy" (Nellie Lutcher) - 6:04
2. "Soulful Drums" (Jack McDuff, Joe Dukes) - 4:16
3. "After Hours" (Avery Parrish) - 4:31
4. "Screamin'" - 7:23
5. "I Cover the Waterfront" (Johnny Green, Edward Heyman) - 3:13
6. "One O'Clock Jump" (Count Basie) - 5:48

== Personnel ==
- Jack McDuff - organ
- Leo Wright - alto saxophone
- Kenny Burrell - guitar
- Joe Dukes - drums
