= Check This Out =

Live album by Jack McDuff
- Released: 1972
- Recorded: 1972
- Venue: The Mandrake Club, Berkeley, California
- Genre: Jazz
- Label: Cadet; CA 50024
- Producer: Esmond Edwards

Jack McDuff chronology
The Heatin' System (1971)	Check This Out (1972)	The Fourth Dimension (1974)

Check This Out is a live album by organist Jack McDuff recorded in Berkeley, California in 1972 and released on the Cadet label.

== Track listing ==
All compositions by Jack McDuff except as indicated

1. "Three Blind Mice" - 9:44
2. "Georgia On My Mind" (Hoagy Carmichael, Stuart Gorrell) - 6:20
3. "Soul Yodel" - 6:03
4. "Middle Class Folk Song" - 6:02
5. "The Jolly Black Giant" - 3:28
6. "Red, White & Blooze" - 8:27

== Personnel ==
- Jack McDuff - organ
- Leo Johnson - flute, clarinet, tenor saxophone, tambourine
- Dave Young - soprano saxophone, tenor saxophone, cowbell
- Red Holloway -alto saxophone, tenor saxophone
- Vinnie Corrao - guitar
- Richard Davis - bass (track 3)
- Ron Davis - drums
- Willie Colon - congas
