= Boss Tenors in Orbit! =

Studio album by Sonny Stitt and Gene Ammons
- Released: 1962
- Recorded: February 18, 1962
- Genre: Jazz
- Length: 57:14
- Label: Verve

Sonny Stitt chronology
Stitt Meets Brother Jack (1962)	Boss Tenors in Orbit! (1962)	Soul Summit (1962)

Gene Ammons chronology
Brother Jack Meets the Boss (1962)	Boss Tenors in Orbit! (1962)	Soul Summit (1962)

Boss Tenors in Orbit! is a 1962 studio album by American jazz tenor saxophonists Sonny Stitt and Gene Ammons.

== Reception ==
The Allmusic review by Michael G. Nastos awarded the album four and a half stars and wrote: "The soulful Ammons and the bop-oriented Stitt meshed well whether playing standards, jamming on familiar melodies, or in ballad form. While not an out-and-out knock-down, drag-out event like their other recordings, this is still one of too few magical efforts with Ammons and Stitt together. Those who crave the live cutting sessions that made jazz very exciting in the early '60s might also consider this tamer studio effort."

Professional ratings
Review scores
Source	Rating
Allmusic	4.5/5 stars

== Track listing ==
1. "Long Ago (and Far Away)" (Ira Gershwin, Jerome Kern) - 6:17
2. "Walkin'" (Jimmy Mundy) - 5:21
3. "Why Was I Born?" (Oscar Hammerstein II, Kern) - 8:20
4. "John Brown's Body" (Traditional) - 7:22
5. "Bye Bye Blackbird" (Mort Dixon, Ray Henderson) - 9:58

== Personnel ==
- Sonny Stitt - tenor saxophone
- Gene Ammons - tenor saxophone
- Don Patterson - organ
- Paul Weeden - guitar
- Billy James - drums
