= Harold Vick =

American jazz saxophonist and flutist (1936-1987)

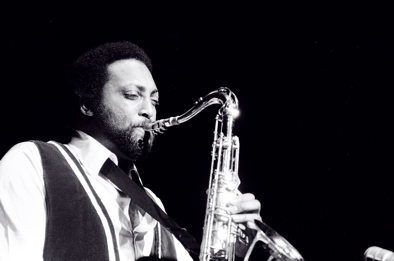

Background information
- Born: Harold Edward Vick; April 3, 1936; Rocky Mount, North Carolina, U.S.
- Died: November 13, 1987 (aged 51) New York City, U.S.
- Genres: Jazz, soul jazz, soul
- Occupation: Musician
- Instruments: Tenor saxophone, flute
- Years active: 1950s–1987
- Labels: Blue Note, RCA Victor

Harold Vick (April 3, 1936 – November 13, 1987) was an American jazz saxophonist and flautist.

== Biography ==
Harold Vick was born on April 3, 1936, in Rocky Mount, North Carolina. At the age of 13, he was given a clarinet by his uncle, Prince Robinson, a clarinet and tenor saxophone player who had been a member of McKinney's Cotton Pickers. Three years later he took up the tenor saxophone, and soon began playing in R&B bands. He continued to perform, still largely with R&B bands, while studying psychology at Howard University.

== Recordings as leader ==
Steppin' Out!, Vick's first album as a leader, was recorded for Blue Note Records in 1963. After a 1965 performance at Carnegie Hall with Donald Byrd, Vick secured a contract for further albums as leader, and from 1966 to 1974, he had further recording sessions for the RCA, Muse, and Strata-East labels.

== Work as sideman ==
Vick worked as a sideman with Jack McDuff from 1960 to 1964, and also with other organists such as Jimmy McGriff, Big John Patton, and Larry Young. For the rest of the 1960s, he played on and off with Walter Bishop Jr., and also worked with Philly Joe Jones, Howard McGhee, Donald Byrd, and Ray Charles. He also appeared with Dizzy Gillespie at the 1968 Newport Jazz Festival.

Vick then worked for around 5 years with soul artists, from 1969 to 1970 with King Curtis, and from 1970 to 1974 with Aretha Franklin. He played in Jack DeJohnette's jazz-rock band Compost from 1971 to 1973, recording with them in 1972.

After a heart attack in the mid-1970s, Vick largely returned to soul jazz, working with Shirley Scott from 1974 to 1976 and with Jimmy McGriff from 1980 to 1981. At the same time he continued to work as a freelance jazz musician and session musician. As late as 1987 he performed on two Billie Holiday tribute albums by Abbey Lincoln.

He also played with Nat Adderley, Mercer Ellington, Sarah Vaughan, Billy Taylor, Horace Silver, and Gene Ammons.

== Film and theatre ==
During the 1960s, Vick worked as a member of the house band at the Apollo Theater, and in 1969 he toured Europe with the Negro Ensemble Company. He also played for a number of stage productions during the 1980s.

He appeared in the films Stardust Memories (1981) and The Cotton Club (1984), in which he played a musician. He was also cast for the Spike Lee film School Daze (1988), and undertook work for the soundtracks for a number of other films.

== Death ==
Vick died at his Manhattan home of another heart attack on November 13, 1987. He was memorialized in the tune "Did You See Harold Vick?", which Sonny Rollins wrote and featured on his album This Is What I Do (2000).

== Discography ==
=== As leader ===
- 1963: Steppin' Out! (Blue Note)
- 1966: The Caribbean Suite (RCA Victor)
- 1966: Straight Up (RCA Victor)
- 1967: Commitment (Muse), released 1974
- 1967: Watch What Happens (RCA Victor)
- 1973: The Power of Feeling (Encounter Records, released under the name "Sir Edward")
- 1974: Don't Look Back (Strata-East)
- 1977: After the Dance (Wolf)

=== As sideman ===
With Walter Bishop Jr.

- Coral Keys (Black Jazz, 1971)

With Compost

- Compost (Columbia, 1972)
- Life Is Round (Columbia, 1973)

With Joe Chambers

- The Almoravid (Muse, 1974)

With Grant Green

- His Majesty King Funk (Verve, 1965)
- The Final Comedown (Blue Note, 1971)

With Richard "Groove" Holmes

- Soul Mist! (Prestige, 1966 [rel. 1970])

With Sam Jones

- Something New (Interplay, 1979)

With Mike Longo

- Talk with the Spirits (Pablo, 1976)

With Les McCann

- Another Beginning (Atlantic, 1974)

With Jack McDuff

- Goodnight, It's Time to Go (Prestige, 1961)
- On With It! (Prestige, 1961 [1971])
- Brother Jack Meets the Boss (Prestige, 1962) - with Gene Ammons
- Soul Summit Vol. 2 (Prestige, 1962) - with Gene Ammons
- Somethin' Slick! (Prestige, 1963)
- Crash! (Prestige, 1963) - with Kenny Burrell
- Brother Jack at the Jazz Workshop Live! (Prestige, 1963)
- Soul Circle (Prestige, 1964-66 [rel. 1968])
- Steppin' Out (Prestige, 1961-66 [rel. 1969])
- The Fourth Dimension (Cadet, 1974)
- Live It Up (Sugar Hill, 1984)

With Jimmy McGriff

- City Lights (JAM, 1981)
- Movin' Upside the Blues (JAM, 1982)

With Bob Moses

- Home in Motion (Ra-Kalam, 2012)

With Jimmy Owens

- Headin' Home (A&M/Horizon, 1978)

With John Patton

- Along Came John (Blue Note, 1963)
- Oh Baby! (Blue Note, 1965)

With Duke Pearson

- Prairie Dog (Atlantic, 1966)

With Houston Person

- Houston Express (Prestige, 1971)

With Bu Pleasant

- Ms. Bu (Muse, 1973)

With Bernard Purdie

- Soul Is... Pretty Purdie (Flying Dutchman, 1972)

With Pharoah Sanders

- Live at the East (Impulse!, 1972)

With Shirley Scott

- One for Me (Strata-East, 1974)

With Horace Silver

- Total Response (Blue Note, 1971)
- All (Blue Note, 1972)
- The United States of Mind (Blue Note, 2004; compilation of both above albums)

With Charles Tolliver

- Impact (Strata-East, 1975)

With McCoy Tyner

- Cosmos (Blue Note, tracks with Vick recorded 1969 [rel. 1977])

With Johnny Hammond

- Wild Horses Rock Steady (Kudu, 1971)
- Gambler's Life (Salvation, 1974)

With Larry Willis

- Inner Crisis (Groove Merchant, 1973)
