= Late Hour Special =

Studio album by Gene Ammons
- Released: 1964
- Recorded: June 13, 1961 and April 13, 1962
- Studio: Van Gelder Studio, Englewood Cliffs, New Jersey
- Genre: Jazz
- Length: 34:56
- Label: Prestige; PR 7287
- Producer: Esmond Edwards

Gene Ammons chronology
| Soul Summit Vol. 2 (1961–62) | Late Hour Special (1964) | The Soulful Moods of Gene Ammons (1962) |

Professional ratings
Review scores
| Source | Rating |
|---|---|
| Allmusic | 3/5 stars |
| The Penguin Guide to Jazz Recordings | 3/4 stars |

Late Hour Special is an album by saxophonist Gene Ammons compiling sessions recorded in 1961 and 1962 and released on the Prestige label in 1964.

== Reception ==
Allmusic awarded the album 3 stars with its review by Scott Yanow stating, "Ammons is the main star throughout... infusing each tune with soul and swing. A fine outing, although with brief (35 & 1/2 minutes) playing time".

== Track listing ==
1. "The Party's Over" (Betty Comden, Adolph Green, Jule Styne) - 5:42
2. "I Wanna Be Loved" (John Green) - 3:57
3. "Things Ain't What They Used to Be" (Mercer Ellington, Ted Persons) - 4:28
4. "Lascivious" (Gene Ammons) - 4:27
5. "Makin' Whoopee" (Walter Donaldson, Gus Kahn) - 5:00
6. "Soft Winds" (Benny Goodman) - 5:48
7. "Lullaby of the Leaves" (Bernice Petkere, Joe Young) - 5:34
- Recorded at Van Gelder Studio in Englewood Cliffs New Jersey on June 13, 1961 (tracks 2, 3, 5 & 7) and September 5, 1962 (tracks 1, 4 & 6)

== Personnel ==
- Gene Ammons - tenor saxophone [Quartet tracks with Patti Bown (tracks 1, 4 & 6); Big Band tracks with Richard Wyands (2, 3, 5 & 7)]
- Hobart Dotson, Clark Terry - trumpet (tracks 2, 3, 5 & 7)
- Oliver Nelson - alto saxophone, arranger (tracks 2, 3, 5 & 7)
- George Barrow, Red Holloway - tenor saxophone (tracks 2, 3, 5 & 7)
- Bob Ashton - baritone saxophone (tracks 2, 3, 5 & 7)
- Patti Bown (tracks 1, 4 & 6), Richard Wyands (tracks 2, 3, 5 & 7) - piano
- George Duvivier (tracks 1, 4 & 6), Wendell Marshall (tracks 2, 3, 5 & 7) - bass
- Walter Perkins (tracks 1, 4 & 6), Bill English (tracks 2, 3, 5 & 7) - drums
- Ray Barretto - congas (tracks 3, 5 & 7)
