= Steppin' Out! =

Studio album by Harold Vick
- Released: 1963
- Recorded: May 27, 1963
- Studio: Van Gelder Studio, Englewood Cliffs, NJ
- Genre: Jazz
- Length: 36:09
- Label: Blue Note
- Producer: Alfred Lion

Harold Vick chronology
Steppin' Out! (1963)	The Caribbean Suite (1966)

Steppin' Out! is the debut album by American saxophonist Harold Vick recorded in 1963 and released on the Blue Note label.

== Reception ==
The Allmusic review by Scott Yanow awarded the album 4½ stars and stated "There are no real surprises, but no disappointments either on what would be Harold Vick's only chance to lead a Blue Note date. At 27 he was already a fine player".

Professional ratings
Review scores
Source	Rating
Allmusic	4.5/5 stars

== Track listing ==
All compositions by Harold Vick except where noted

1. "Our Miss Brooks" - 7:27
2. "Trimmed in Blue" - 6:10
3. "Laura" (David Raksin, Johnny Mercer) - 4:39
4. "Dotty's Dream" - 6:24
5. "Vicksville" - 5:39
6. "Steppin' Out" - 5:50

- Recorded at Rudy Van Gelder Studio, Englewood Cliffs, New Jersey on May 27, 1963

== Personnel ==
- Harold Vick - tenor saxophone
- Blue Mitchell - trumpet
- John Patton - organ
- Grant Green - guitar
- Ben Dixon - drums

== Charts ==
2022 chart performance for Steppin' Out!
Chart (2022)	Peak position
German Albums (Offizielle Top 100)	98
