= The Heatin' System =

Studio album by Jack McDuff
- Released: 1972
- Recorded: 1971; Ter Mar Studios, Chicago, Illinois and The Hit Factory, New York, NY
- Genre: Jazz
- Label: Cadet; 2CA 60017
- Producer: Esmond Edwards

Jack McDuff chronology
Who Knows What Tomorrow's Gonna Bring? (1970)	The Heatin' System (1972)	Check This Out (1972)

Professional ratings
Review scores
Source	Rating
Allmusic	4/5 stars

The Heatin' System is a double album by organist Jack McDuff recorded in 1971 which was his fourth release on the Cadet label and the first following his stint with Blue Note.

== Reception ==
The Allmusic site awarded the album 4 stars.

== Track listing ==
All compositions by Jack McDuff except as indicated

1. "The Heatin' System" - 12:25
2. "Elmo Tucker" - 6:00
3. "The Boiler" - 10:42
4. "The Prophet" (Alfred Ellis) - 4:12
5. "Pressure Gauge" - 10:34
6. "Lonesome Is the Night" - 6:39
7. "Ain't No Sunshine" (Bill Withers) - 8:33
8. "Radiation" (McDuff, J. J. Jackson) - 10:19

== Personnel ==
- Jack McDuff - organ, piano, melodica
- Bobby Alston - trumpet
- Don Myrick, David Young - tenor saxophone, flute
- Marty Roberts - guitar
- Phil Upchurch - electric bass (tracks 1, 3–5, 7 & 8)
- Sam Jones - bass (tracks 2 & 6)
- Greg Williams - drums
- Frederick Walker - congas
