= The Caribbean Suite =

Studio album by Harold Vick
- Released: 1967
- Recorded: June 15–16, 1966 in NYC
- Genre: Jazz
- Length: 45:52
- Label: RCA Victor LSP 3677
- Producer: Brad McCuen

Harold Vick chronology
Steppin' Out! (1963)	The Caribbean Suite (1967)	Straight Up (1967)

The Caribbean Suite is the second album led by American saxophonist Harold Vick recorded in 1966 and released on the RCA Victor label. The disc features Kenny Graham's eight-part "Caribbean Suite".

== Reception ==
The Allmusic review by Ken Dryden awarded the album 4 stars and stated "Harold Vick led relatively few record dates of his own, but this little-known session is one of his better efforts".

Professional ratings
Review scores
Source	Rating
Allmusic	4/5 stars

== Track listing ==
All compositions by Kenny Graham except as indicated

1. "Mango Walk" - 4:29
2. "Saga Boy" - 1:55
3. "Bongo Chant" - 4:59
4. "Dance of the Zombies" - 4:30
5. "Wha' Hupp'n?" - 5:38
6. "Tiempo Medio Lento" - 3:29
7. "Beguine" - 3:22
8. "Haitian Ritual" - 3:04
9. "Barbados" (Charlie Parker) - 2:53
10. "Jamaica Farewell" (Lord Burgess) - 3:09
11. "Letitia" (Harold Vick) - 5:24

== Personnel ==
- Harold Vick - tenor saxophone, soprano saxophone, flute
- Blue Mitchell - trumpet
- Bobby Hutcherson - vibraphone
- Albert Dailey - piano
- Everett Barksdale - guitar
- Walter Booker - bass
- Mickey Roker - drums
- Montego Joe, Manuel Ramos - Latin percussion
