= Bigger & Better =

Studio album by David Newman
- Released: 1968
- Recorded: March 5, 6 & 7, 1968; NYC
- Genre: Jazz
- Label: Atlantic; SD 1505
- Producer: Joel Dorn

David Newman chronology
Double Barrelled Soul (1967)	Bigger & Better (1968)	The Many Facets of David Newman (1968)

Bigger & Better is an album by American saxophonist David Newman featuring performances recorded in 1968 for the Atlantic label.

== Reception ==
Professional ratings
Review scores
Source	Rating
Allmusic	3/5 stars

Allmusic awarded the album 3 stars stating "The sessions that resulted in Bigger & Better feature Newman with a string section and studio musicians for forgettable versions of two Beatles songs, a pair of Sam Cooke R&B pieces and a couple of lesser items".

== Track listing ==
1. "Yesterday" (John Lennon, Paul McCartney) - 4:03
2. "And I Love Her" (Lennon, McCartney) - 5:46
3. "The Thirteenth Floor" (David Newman) - 5:56
4. "Ain't That Good News" (Sam Cooke) - 3:46
5. "A Change Is Gonna Come" (Cooke) - 5:35
6. "For Sylvia" (William S. Fischer) - 6:43

== Personnel ==
- David Newman - tenor saxophone, alto saxophone, flute
- Melvin Lastie (tracks 1–5), Joe Newman (tracks 1 & 2), Jimmy Owens (tracks 3–5) - trumpet
- Benny Powell - trombone (tracks 1–5)
- Seldon Powell - tenor saxophone (tracks 1–5)
- Henry Haywood (tracks 1 & 2), Jerome Richardson (tracks 3–5) - baritone saxophone
- George Stubbs - piano (track 6)
- Billy Butler (tracks 1, 2 & 6), Eric Gale (tracks 3–6) - guitar
- Richard Davis - bass (tracks 1–5)
- Chuck Rainey - electric bass
- Bernard Purdie - drums
- Winston Collymore, Leo Cruczek, Richard Elias, Emanuel Green, Leo Kahn, Gene Orloff, Matthew Raimondi - violin (tracks 1–3, 5 7 6)
- Alfred Brown, Selwart Clarke - viola (tracks 1–3, 5 & 6)
- Kermit Moore - cello (tracks 1–3, 5 & 6)
