= Soul Summit =

Studio album by Gene Ammons & Sonny Stitt with Jack McDuff
- Released: 1962
- Recorded: February 19, 1962
- Studio: Van Gelder Studio, Englewood Cliffs, New Jersey
- Genre: Jazz
- Length: 36:55
- Label: Prestige; PR 7234
- Producer: Esmond Edwards

Gene Ammons chronology
Boss Tenors in Orbit! (1962)	Soul Summit (1962)	Soul Summit Vol. 2 (1961–62)

Sonny Stitt chronology
Boss Tenors in Orbit! (1962)	Soul Summit (1962)	Feelin's (1962)

Alternative Cover
- 1968 edition

Professional ratings
Review scores
Source	Rating
Allmusic	4/5 stars
Down Beat	3.5/5 stars

Soul Summit is an album by saxophonists Gene Ammons and Sonny Stitt with organist Jack McDuff recorded in 1962 and released on the Prestige label.

== Reception ==
The Allmusic review stated "Overall, this is an interesting and consistently swinging set that adds to the large quantity of recordings that the great Ammons did during the early '60s".

== Track listing ==
All compositions by Gene Ammons except where noted

1. "Tubby" - 9:10
2. "Dumplin'" (Sonny Stitt) - 5:00
3. "When You Wish Upon a Star" (Leigh Harline, Ned Washington) - 4:30
4. "Shuffle Twist" - 6:00
5. "Sleeping Susan" (Jimmy Mundy) - 5:35
6. "Out in the Cold Again" (Rube Bloom, Ted Koehler) - 6:40

== Personnel ==
- Gene Ammons, Sonny Stitt - tenor saxophone
- Jack McDuff - organ
- Charlie Persip - drums
