= A Change Is Gonna Come (Jack McDuff album) =

Studio album by Jack McDuff
- Released: 1966
- Recorded: May 4 & 5, 1966; New York City
- Genre: Soul jazz
- Length: 36:23
- Label: Atlantic; 1463

Jack McDuff chronology
I Got a Woman (1969)	A Change Is Gonna Come (1966)	Tobacco Road (1966)

Professional ratings
Review scores
Source	Rating
Allmusic	3.5/5 stars

A Change Is Gonna Come is a 1966 album by organist Brother Jack McDuff which was his first released on the Atlantic label.

== Reception ==
Bruce Eder in his review for Allmusic states, "The tempo and texture shifts throughout keep this record continually interesting to the listener, and the range of influences, from jazz to gospel with side trips into the blues (culminating with a seven-minute epic in the latter genre), gives a lot of great playing for everybody".

== Track listing ==
All compositions by Jack McDuff except as indicated

1. "Down in the Valley" (Traditional; arranged by Jack McDuff) - 2:18
2. "A Change Is Gonna Come" (Sam Cooke) - 3:05
3. "Hot Cha" (Willie Woods) - 4:18
4. "What'd I Say" (Ray Charles) - 2:33
5. "No Tears" (Red Holloway) - 3:32
6. "Gonna Hang Me Up a Sign" - 2:35
7. "Minha Saudade" (João Donato, João Gilberto) - 5:51
8. "Same Old Same Old" (Roger Kellaway) - 4:42
9. "Can't Find the Keyhole Blues" - 7:17
- Recorded in New York City on May 4 (tracks 1, 2, 4 & 6) and May 5 (tracks 3, 5 & 7–9), 1966.

== Personnel ==
- Jack McDuff - organ
- Johnny Grimes, Harold Johnson - trumpet (tracks 1, 2, 4 & 6)
- Richard Harris - trombone (tracks 1, 2, 4 & 6)
- Danny Turner - alto saxophone (tracks 3, 5 & 7–9)
- Arthur Clarke (tracks 1, 2, 4 & 6), George Coleman (tracks 3, 5 & 7–9) - tenor saxophone
- Buddy Lucas - baritone saxophone (tracks 1, 2, 4 & 6)
- James Oliver - guitar (tracks 1, 2, 4 & 6)
- Cornell Dupree - guitar, congas (tracks 3, 5 & 7–9)
- Jimmy Tyrell - bass
- Joe Dukes (tracks 3, 5 & 7–9), Bernard Purdie - drums
- Warren Smith - percussion (tracks 1, 2, 4 & 6)

== Other credits ==
- Arranged by Jack McDuff (tracks 1, 2, 4 and 6) and J.J. Jackson (tracks 3, 5, 7, 8 and 9)
