= Red Holloway =

American jazz saxophonist (1927–2012)

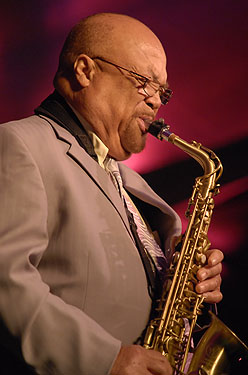
- Holloway performing in 2008

Background information
- Born: James Wesley Holloway; May 31, 1927; Helena, Arkansas, U.S.
- Died: February 25, 2012 (aged 84) Morro Bay, California, U.S.
- Genres: Jazz, bebop, hard bop
- Occupation: Musician
- Instruments: Tenor saxophone, alto saxophone

James Wesley "Red" Holloway (May 31, 1927 – February 25, 2012) was an American jazz saxophonist.

== Biography ==
Born in Helena, Arkansas, Holloway started playing banjo and harmonica, switching to tenor saxophone when he was 12 years old. He graduated from DuSable High School in Chicago, where he had played in the school big band with Johnny Griffin and Eugene Wright, and went on to attend the city's Conservatory of Music. He joined the Army when he was 19 and became bandmaster for the U.S. Fifth Army Band, and after completing his military service returned to Chicago and played with Yusef Lateef and Dexter Gordon, among others. In 1948, he joined blues vocalist Roosevelt Sykes, and later played with other rhythm & blues musicians such as Willie Dixon, Junior Parker, and Lloyd Price.

In the 1950s, he played in the Chicago area with Billie Holiday, Muddy Waters, Chuck Berry, Ben Webster, Jimmy Rushing, Arthur Prysock, Dakota Staton, Eddie "Cleanhead" Vinson, Wardell Gray, Sonny Rollins, Red Rodney, Lester Young, Joe Williams, Redd Foxx, The Moonglows, B.B. King, Bobby Bland, and Aretha Franklin. During this period, he also toured with Sonny Stitt, Memphis Slim and Lionel Hampton. He became a member of the house band for Chance Records in 1952. He subsequently appeared on many recording sessions for the Chicago-based independents Parrot, United and States, and Vee-Jay.

From 1963 to 1966, he was in organist "Brother" Jack McDuff's band, which also featured guitarist George Benson, who was then at the start of his career. In 1974, Holloway recorded The Latest Edition with John Mayall and toured Europe, Japan, Australia and New Zealand. From 1977 to 1982, Holloway worked with Sonny Stitt, recording two albums together, and following Stitt's death, Holloway played and recorded with Clark Terry.

Red Holloway died in Morro Bay, California, aged 84 of a stroke and kidney failure on February 25, 2012, one month after Etta James, with whom he had worked extensively. He was buried at Forest Lawn Memorial Park in the Hollywood Hills of Los Angeles.

== Discography ==
=== As leader/co-leader ===
- The Burner (Prestige, 1963) with Big John Patton, Eric Gale
- Cookin' Together (Prestige, 1964) with Jack McDuff, George Benson; reissued on CD as Brother Red in 1995.
- Sax, Strings & Soul (Prestige, 1964)
- Red Soul (Prestige, 1965) with Dr. Lonnie Smith, George Benson
- Forecast: Sonny & Red (Catalyst, 1976) with Sonny Stitt
- Partners (Catalyst, 1978) with Sonny Stitt
- Hittin' the Road Again (JAM [Jazz America Marketing], 1983) with Shuggie Otis
- Nica's Dream (Steeplechase, 1984) with Horace Parlan
- Red Holloway & Company (Concord, 1987) with Cedar Walton
- Locksmith Blues (Concord, 1989) with Clark Terry
- Live at the 1995 Floating Jazz Festival (Chiaroscuro, 1995 [rel. 1997]) with Harry "Sweets" Edison
- Grooveyard (JHM [JazzHausMusik, Germany] Records, 1996) with Matthias Bätzel Trio
- Day Dream (Tonewheel, 1997) with T.C. Pfeiler
- In the Red (HighNote, 1997) with Norman Simmons
- A Night of Blues & Ballads (JHM [JazzHausMusik, Germany] Records, 1998) with Matthias Bätzel Trio
- Standing Room Only (Chiaroscuro, 1998 [rel. 2000]) with Junior Mance, Phil Upchurch, O.C. Smith
- Keep That Groove Going! (Milestone, 2001) with Plas Johnson
- Coast to Coast (Milestone, 2003) with Dr. Lonnie Smith, Melvin Sparks
- Something Old, Something New (R/H [Red Holloway] Recording Company, 2007) with Sacha Boutros
- Go Red Go! (Delmark, 2008) with George Freeman, Henry Johnson, Chris Foreman, Greg Rockingham
- September Songs (Organic Music, 2009) with Bernhard Pichi Trio

=== Compilations ===
- The Best of Red Holloway & The Soul Organ Giants with Brother Jack McDuff & Lonnie Smith (Prestige, 1970) also with Big John Patton; contains two tracks from each album: The Burner (with Patton), Cookin' Together (with McDuff), Red Soul (with Smith).
- Legends of Acid Jazz: Red Holloway (Prestige, 1998) (compilation of The Burner + Red Soul)

=== As sideman ===
With Gene Ammons

- Soul Summit Vol. 2 (Prestige, 1961-62 [rel. 1963]) with Etta Jones
- Late Hour Special (Prestige, 1961-62 [rel. 1964])
- Velvet Soul (Prestige, 1961-62 [rel. 1964])
- Free Again (Prestige, 1972)

With George Benson

- The New Boss Guitar of George Benson (Prestige, 1964) with Jack McDuff, Joe Dukes

With Freddy Cole

- Live at Birdland West (LaserLight, 1992) with Jerry Byrd

With Joe Dukes

- The Soulful Drums of Joe Dukes (Prestige, 1964) with Jack McDuff, George Benson

With Atle Hammer

- Arizona Blues (Gemini Records, 1989)

With Etta James

- 12 Songs of Christmas (Private Music, 1998)
- Heart of a Woman (Private Music, 1999)
- Blue Gardenia (Private Music, 2001)

With Etta James and Eddie "Cleanhead" Vinson

- Blues in the Night Volume One: The Early Show (Fantasy, 1986) with Jack McDuff, Shuggie Otis
- The Late Show: Blues In The Night Volume 2 (Fantasy, 1987) with Jack McDuff, Shuggie Otis

With Junior Mance

- The Floating Jazz Festival Trio [live] (Chiaroscuro, 1997, [rel. 1999]) with Henry Johnson

With Wade Marcus

- Metamorphosis (Impulse!, 1976)

With John Mayall

- Ten Years Are Gone (Polydor, 1973)
- The Latest Edition (Polydor, 1974)

With Jack McDuff

- Brother Jack McDuff Live! (Prestige, 1963)
- Brother Jack at the Jazz Workshop Live! (Prestige, 1963)
- Prelude (Prestige, 1963)
- The Dynamic Jack McDuff (Prestige, 1964)
- The Concert McDuff (Prestige, 1964)
- Silk and Soul (Prestige, 1965)
- Hot Barbeque (Prestige, 1965)
- Walk On By (Prestige, 1966)
- Hallelujah Time! (Prestige, 1963-66 [rel. 1967])
- The Midnight Sun (Prestige, 1963-66 [rel. 1967])
- Soul Circle (Prestige, 1964-66 [rel. 1968])
- I Got a Woman (Prestige, 1964-66 [rel. 1969])
- Steppin' Out (Prestige, 1961-66 [rel. 1969])
- Tobacco Road (Atlantic, 1966)
- Check This Out [live] (Cadet, 1972)

With Jimmy McGriff

- The Dream Team (Milestone, 1997)

With Carmen McRae

- Fine and Mellow: Live at Birdland West (Concord, 1987) with Jack McDuff, Phil Upchurch

With Knut Riisnæs

- Confessin' the Blues (Gemini Records, 1989 [rel. 1991])
- The Gemini Twins (Gemini Records, 1992)

With Horace Silver

- It's Got to Be Funky (Columbia, 1993)
- Pencil Packin' Papa (Columbia, 1994)

With Clark Terry

- Squeeze Me! (Chiaroscuro, 1989 [rel. 1991])
- Top and Bottom: Live at the 1995 Floating Jazz Festival (Chiaroscuro, 1997)

With Joe Williams

- Nothin' but the Blues (Delos, 1983) -with Eddie "Cleanhead" Vinson, Jack McDuff, Phil Upchurch
