= Moon Rappin' =

Studio album by Brother Jack McDuff
- Released: 1969
- Recorded: December 1, 2, 3 & 11, 1969
- Genre: Jazz-funk
- Length: 46:00
- Label: Blue Note
- Producer: Jack McDuff

Brother Jack McDuff chronology
Down Home Style (1969)	Moon Rappin' (1969)	To Seek a New Home (1970)

Moon Rappin' is an album by American organist Brother Jack McDuff recorded in 1969 and released on the Blue Note label.

== Reception ==
The Allmusic review by Stephen Thomas Erlewine awarded the album 3 stars and stated "Moon Rappin' is one of Brother Jack McDuff's most ambitious efforts, a loose concept album that finds the organist exploring funky and spacy soundscapes... It's not strictly funky -- it doesn't have the grit of early Brother Jack records, nor does it swing hard -- but it proves that McDuff was as adept in adventurous territory as he was with the groove".

Professional ratings
Review scores
Source	Rating
Allmusic	3/5 stars

== Track listing ==
All compositions by Jack McDuff

1. "Flat Backin'" – 10:23
2. "Oblighetto" – 6:36
3. "Moon Rappin'" – 6:21
4. "Made in Sweden" – 7:37
5. "Loose Foot" – 5:03

- Recorded at Soundview Recording Studio in Kings Park, New York on December 1 (track 1), December 2 (track 2), December 3 (track 3) and December 11 (tracks 4 & 5), 1969.

== Personnel ==
- Brother Jack McDuff – organ (tracks 1–5), piano (track 3)
- Danny Moore – trumpet (tracks 1–3)
- Ron Park – tenor saxophone (tracks 1, 5), flute (tracks 1, 3, 4), electric bass (track 2)
- John Manning – tenor saxophone (tracks 1–4)
- Hayward Henry – baritone saxophone (track 1)
- Melvin Sparks – electric guitar (tracks 1–5)
- Roland Prince – rhythm guitar (track 3)
- Richard Davis – Ampeg baby bass (tracks 1, 3)
- Vince DiLeonardi – drums (tracks 1, 2, 5)
- Spider Bryce – drums (tracks 1, 3)
- Joe Dukes – drums (track 4)
- Jean Dushoan – vocal (track 2)
