= On with It! =

On With It!

Studio album by Jack McDuff
- Released: 1971
- Recorded: December 1, 1961
- Studio: Van Gelder Studio, Englewood Cliffs, New Jersey
- Genre: Jazz
- Length: 38:17
- Label: Prestige; PR 7851
- Producer: Esmond Edwards

Jack McDuff chronology
Goodnight, It's Time to Go (1961)	On With It! (1971)	Brother Jack Meets the Boss (1962)

Professional ratings
Review scores
Source	Rating
Allmusic	3/5 stars

On With It! is an album by organist Jack McDuff recorded in 1961 but not released on the Prestige label until 1971.

== Reception ==
In his review for Allmusic, Scott Yanow states "the results are danceable, yet full of honest feeling and some chance taking within the boundaries of soul-jazz".

== Track listing ==
All compositions by Jack McDuff except where noted

1. "Hey Lawdy Mama" (Jimmy Reed) - 4:04
2. "The Last Goodun'" - 6:49
3. "Dink's Dream" - 3:48
4. "Drown in My Own Tears" (Henry Glover) - 3:09
5. "Groanin'" - 8:12
6. "Your Nose Is Open" - 8:15

== Personnel ==
- Jack McDuff - organ
- Harold Vick - tenor saxophone
- Eddie Diehl - guitar
- Joe Dukes - drums
