= Goodnight, It's Time to Go =

Studio album by Jack McDuff
- Released: 1961
- Recorded: July 14, 1961
- Studio: Van Gelder Studio, Englewood Cliffs, New Jersey
- Genre: Jazz
- Length: 35:44
- Label: Prestige; PR 7220
- Producer: Esmond Edwards

Jack McDuff chronology
The Honeydripper (1961)	Goodnight, It's Time to Go (1961)	On With It! (1961)

Goodnight, It's Time to Go is the fourth album by organist Jack McDuff recorded in 1961 and released on the Prestige label.

== Reception ==
Professional ratings
Review scores
Source	Rating
Allmusic	3/5 stars

Scott Yanow of Allmusic states, "This 1961 date was organist Jack McDuff's first with his regular working band. That group included two players who would become synonymous with the organ combo, soul-jazz sound: tenor saxophonist Harold Vick and the up-and-coming guitarist Grant Green".

== Track listing ==
All compositions by Jack McDuff except as indicated

1. "Sanctified Waltz" - 4:51
2. "Goodnight, It's Time to Go" (Calvin Carter, James Hudson) - 6:12
3. "I'll Be Seeing You" (Sammy Fain, Irving Kahal) - 7:35
4. "A Smooth One" (Benny Goodman) - 10:45
5. "McDuff Speaking" - 6:21

== Personnel ==
- Jack McDuff - organ
- Harold Vick - tenor saxophone
- Grant Green - guitar
- Joe Dukes - drums
