= Bill English (musician) =

American jazz drummer (1925–2007)

- Birth name: William English
- Born: August 27, 1925; New York City, New York, U.S.
- Died: March 4, 2007 (aged 81); New York City, New York, U.S.
- Genres: Jazz, R&B (early)
- Instruments: Drums

William English (August 27, 1925 – March 4, 2007) was an American jazz drummer.

== Early life ==
English played early in his career with rhythm and blues musicians in the 1950s, including Sonny Thompson and Amos Milburn. He then worked with Julian Dash, Bennie Green, and Erskine Hawkins in the mid-1950s before becoming a house drummer at New York's Apollo Theatre. Late in the 1950s he worked with his own ensemble, and in the 1960s played with Earl Hines, Prestige Blues Swingers, Gene Ammons, Quincy Jones, Joe Newman, Stanley Turrentine, Kenny Burrell, and Eddie Jefferson. He remained active into the 1970s, working with Eric Dixon among others.
