= Straight Up (Harold Vick album) =

Studio album by Harold Vick
- Released: 1967
- Recorded: October 3 & 4, 1966 at RCA Studio B in NYC
- Genre: Jazz
- Label: RCA Victor LSP 3761

Harold Vick chronology
| The Caribbean Suite (1967) | Straight Up (1967) | Watch What Happens (1967) |

Straight Up is an album led by American saxophonist Harold Vick recorded in 1966 and released on the RCA Victor label.

== Reception ==
The Allmusic review by Jason Ankeny awarded the album 4 stars and stated "Vick alternates between tenor, soprano, and flute, greatly expanding the parameters of his sound while maintaining the simplicity that is his hallmark.".

Professional ratings
Review scores
| Source | Rating |
|---|---|
| Allmusic | 4/5 stars |

== Track listing ==
All compositions by Harold Vick except as indicated

1. "If I Should Lose You" (Ralph Rainger, Leo Robin) - 4:15
2. "Like A Breath of Spring (Bossa)" (Phil Bodner) - 2:55
3. "Gone with the Wind" (Allie Wrubel, Herb Magidson) - 5:22
4. "Straight Up" - 2:39
5. "We'll Be Together Again" (Carl T. Fischer, Frankie Laine) - 5:47
6. "Lonely Girl" (Neal Hefti) - 2:39
7. "A Rose For Wray (Bossa)" - 5:42
8. "Flamingo" (Ted Grouya, Edmund Anderson) - 4:56
9. "Winter Blossom" - 4:58

== Personnel ==
- Harold Vick - tenor saxophone, soprano saxophone, flute
- Virgil Jones - trumpet
- Warren Chiasson - vibraphone
- Albert Dailey - piano
- Everett Barksdale - guitar (tracks 2, 4 & 6)
- Walter Booker - bass
- Hugh Walker - drums
