= Somethin' Slick! =

Studio album by Jack McDuff
- Released: 1963
- Recorded: January 8, 1963
- Studio: Van Gelder Studio, Englewood Cliffs, New Jersey
- Genre: Jazz
- Label: Prestige; PR 7265
- Producer: Ozzie Cadena

Jack McDuff chronology
Screamin' (1962)	Somethin' Slick! (1963)	Crash! (1963)

Professional ratings
Review scores
Source	Rating
Allmusic	3/5 stars
Down Beat	1.5/5 stars

Somethin' Slick!' is an album by organist Jack McDuff recorded in 1963 and released on the Prestige label.

== Reception ==
Allmusic awarded the album 3 stars.

== Track listing ==
All compositions by Jack McDuff except as indicated

1. "Our Miss Brooks" (Harold Vick) - 10:45
2. "Somethin' Slick" - 6:34
3. "Smut" - 6:14
4. "How High the Moon" (Nancy Hamilton, Morgan Lewis) - 7:34
5. "It's a Wonderful World" (Harold Adamson, Jan Savitt) - 5:23

== Personnel ==
- Jack McDuff - organ
- Harold Vick - tenor saxophone (tracks 1, 2, 4)
- Eric Dixon - tenor saxophone (tracks 2, 4)
- Kenny Burrell (as K.B. Groovington) - guitar
- Joe Dukes - drums
