= Jack McDuff =

American jazz organist and bandleader (1926–2001)

Background information
- Also known as: "Brother" Jack McDuff; "Captain" Jack McDuff
- Born: Eugene McDuffy; September 17, 1926; Champaign, Illinois, U.S.
- Died: January 23, 2001 (aged 74) Minneapolis, Minnesota, U.S.
- Genres: Jazz; soul jazz; hard bop; jazz-funk; R&B
- Occupation: Musician
- Instrument: Organ
- Years active: 1950s–2001
- Labels: Prestige; Atlantic; Blue Note; Concord

Eugene McDuffy (September 17, 1926 – January 23, 2001), known professionally as "Brother" Jack McDuff or "Captain" Jack McDuff, was an American jazz organist and organ trio bandleader. He was most prominent during the hard bop and soul jazz era of the 1960s, often performing with an organ trio. He is also credited with giving guitarist George Benson his first break.

== Career ==
Born Eugene McDuffy in Champaign, Illinois, McDuff began playing bass, appearing in Joe Farrell's group. Encouraged by Willis Jackson in whose band he also played bass in the late 1950s, McDuff moved to the organ and began to attract the attention of Prestige while still with Jackson's group. McDuff soon became a bandleader, leading groups featuring a young George Benson on guitar, Red Holloway on tenor saxophone and Joe Dukes on drums.

McDuff recorded many classic albums on Prestige, including his debut solo Brother Jack in 1960; The Honeydripper (1961), with tenor saxophonist Jimmy Forrest and guitarist Grant Green; Brother Jack Meets the Boss (1962), featuring Gene Ammons; Screamin’ (1962), with alto saxophonist Leo Wright and guitarist Kenny Burrell; and Brother Jack McDuff Live! (1963), featuring Holloway and Benson, which includes his biggest hit, "Rock Candy".

After his tenure at Prestige, McDuff joined the Atlantic label for a brief period, and in the 1970s he recorded for Blue Note. To Seek a New Home (1970) was recorded in England with a line-up featuring blues shouter Jimmy Witherspoon and some of Britain's top jazz musicians of the day, including Terry Smith on guitar and Dick Morrissey on tenor saxophone.

Decreasing interest in jazz and blues during the late 1970s and 1980s meant that many jazz musicians went through a lean time. But in 1988, with The Reentry, recorded for the Muse label, McDuff once again began a successful period of recordings, initially for Muse, then on the Concord Jazz label in 1991. George Benson appeared on his 1992 Color Me Blue album.

Despite having health problems, McDuff continued working and recording throughout the 1980s and 1990s, and he toured Japan with Atsuko Hashimoto in 2000. "Capt'n" Jack McDuff, as he later became known, died of heart failure at the age of 74 in Minneapolis, Minneapolis. His first wife, the former Dink Dixon, died in the early 1980s. McDuff was married to his second wife Kathy; Kathy had two children.

== Discography ==
=== As leader ===
Prestige Records

- Brother Jack (Prestige, 1960) -with Bill Jennings [note: reissued on Groove Hut (#66714) in 2011]
- Tough 'Duff (Prestige, 1960) -with Jimmy Forrest, Lem Winchester [note: reissued on Groove Hut (#66714) in 2011]
- The Honeydripper (Prestige, 1961) -with Jimmy Forrest, Grant Green [note: reissued on Groove Hut (#66717) in 2013]
- Goodnight, It's Time to Go (Prestige, 1961) -with Harold Vick, Grant Green [note: reissued on Groove Hut (#66717) in 2013]
- On With It! (Prestige, 1961 [rel. 1971]) -with Harold Vick
- Brother Jack Meets the Boss [also released as Mellow Gravy] (Prestige, 1962) -with Gene Ammons [note: reissued on Groove Hut (#66721) in 2015]
- Stitt Meets Brother Jack [also released as 'Nuther Fu'ther] (Prestige, 1962) -with Sonny Stitt [note: reissued on Groove Hut (#66718) in 2013]
- Screamin' (Prestige, 1962) -with Leo Wright, Kenny Burrell
- Somethin' Slick! (Prestige, 1963) -with Kenny Burrell
- Crash! (Prestige 1963) -with Kenny Burrell
- Brother Jack McDuff Live! (Prestige, 1963) -with Red Holloway, George Benson
- Brother Jack at the Jazz Workshop Live! (Prestige, 1963) -with Red Holloway, Harold Vick, George Benson
- Prelude (Prestige, 1963) -with Benny Golson's big soul band
- Cookin' Together (Prestige, 1964) -with Red Holloway, George Benson, Joe Dukes
- The Dynamic Jack McDuff (Prestige, 1964) -with Benny Golson's big soul band
- The Concert McDuff (Prestige, 1964) -with Red Holloway, George Benson
- Silk and Soul (Prestige, 1965) -with Red Holloway, George Benson
- Hot Barbeque (Prestige, 1965) -with Red Holloway, George Benson
- Walk On By (Prestige, 1966) -with Red Holloway, Harold Ousley, Pat Martino
- Hallelujah Time! (Prestige, rec. 1963/1964/1966 [rel. 1967])
- The Midnight Sun (Prestige, rec. 1963/1964/1965/1966 [rel. 1968])
- Soul Circle (Prestige, rec. 1964/1965/1966 [rel. 1968])
- I Got a Woman (Prestige, rec. 1964/1965/1966 [rel. 1969])
- Steppin' Out (Prestige, rec. 1961/1963/1964/1965/1966 [rel. 1969])

Atlantic Records

- A Change Is Gonna Come (Atlantic, 1966) [note: reissued on Collectables in 1999]
- Tobacco Road (Atlantic, 1966) [note: reissued on Collectables in 2000]
- Do It Now! (Atlantic, 1967) [note: reissued on Collectables in 2000]
- Double Barrelled Soul (Atlantic, 1967) -with David "Fathead" Newman [note: reissued on Collectables in 1999]

Cadet/GRT Records

- The Natural Thing (Cadet/GRT, 1968)
- Getting Our Thing Together (Cadet/GRT, 1968) -with Richard Evans
- Gin and Orange (Cadet/GRT, 1969) [note: reissued on Dusty Groove in 2007]
- The Heatin' System (Cadet/GRT, 1971)
- Check This Out [live] (Cadet/GRT, 1972)
- The Fourth Dimension (Cadet/GRT, 1974)
- Magnetic Feel (Cadet/GRT, 1975)
- Sophisticated Funk (Chess/All Platinum ACH-19004, 1976)

Blue Note Records

- Down Home Style (Blue Note, 1969)
- Moon Rappin' (Blue Note, 1969)
- To Seek a New Home (Blue Note 1970)
- Who Knows What Tomorrow's Gonna Bring? (Blue Note, 1970) [note: reissued on Water Records in 2005]

Other labels

- Kisses (Sugar Hill SH-247, 1981)
- Having A Good Time (Sugar Hill SH-264, 1982)
- Live It Up (Sugar Hill/Chess/MCA SH-9202, 1984)
- Lift Every Voice And Sing (JAM [Jazz America Marketing] 016, 1984)
- The Reentry (Muse MR-5361, 1988) -with Cecil Bridgewater, Houston Person [note: reissued on 32 Jazz in 1997; reissued again on Savoy Jazz in 2003]
- Another Real Good 'Un (Muse MR-5374, 1990) -with Cecil Bridgewater, Houston Person [note: reissued on 32 Jazz in 1999; reissued on Savoy Jazz in 2003]
- Jack-Pot (Red [Italy] 123267, 1997 [rec. 1991])
- Live At Parnell's (Soul Bank Music, 2022 [rec. 1982])
- Ain't No Sunshine: Live in Seattle (Reel To Real/Cellar Music Group, 2024 [rec. 1972])

Concord Jazz Records

- Color Me Blue (Concord Jazz, 1992) -with George Benson
- Write On, Capt'n (Concord Jazz, 1993)
- The Heatin' System (Concord Jazz, 1994)
- It's About Time (Concord Jazz, 1995) -with Joey DeFrancesco
- That's The Way I Feel About It (Concord Jazz, 1996) -with Chris Potter
- (Down Home) Blues (Concord Jazz, 1997) -with Gene Harris
- Bringin' It Home (Concord Jazz, 1998) -with Red Holloway, George Benson
- Brotherly Love (Concord Jazz, 2001) -with Red Holloway, Pat Martino

=== LP/CD compilations ===
- Brother Jack McDuff's Greatest Hits (Prestige 7481, 1967)
- Brother Jack McDuff Plays For Beautiful People (Prestige 7596, 1968)
- The Best Of Brother Jack McDuff Live! (Prestige 7703, 1969)
- The Best Of Brother Jack McDuff & The Big Soul Band (Prestige 7771, 1970) -with Benny Golson
- Rock Candy (Prestige 24013, 1972) [2LP]
- George Benson/Jack McDuff (Prestige 24072, 1977 [2LP]; CD finally released in 2007) (compilation of The New Boss Guitar Of George Benson + Hot Barbeque)
- Crash! Jack McDuff Featuring Kenny Burrell (Prestige, 1994) (compilation of Somethin' Slick! + Crash!)
- Brother Red: Red Holloway With Jack McDuff, George Benson, Joe Dukes (Prestige, 1994) (compilation of Cookin' Together + 3 tracks from The Dynamic Jack McDuff, and "Redwood City"...originally released on the various artists' compilation The Soul Jazz Giants [Prestige 7791] in 1971)
- Live! (Prestige, 1994) (compilation of Brother Jack McDuff Live! + Brother Jack At The Jazz Workshop Live!)
- Legends Of Acid Jazz: Jack McDuff (Prestige, 1997) (compilation drawn from six different McDuff albums; all material recorded July 1964)
- Legends Of Acid Jazz: Jack McDuff – Brother Jack (Prestige, 1999) (compilation of Brother Jack + Goodnight, It's Time To Go)
- Silken Soul (Prestige, 2000) (compilation drawn from seven different McDuff albums)
- The Soulful Drums (Prestige, 2001) (compilation of The Soulful Drums Of Joe Dukes + Hot Barbeque)
- The Concert McDuff (Prestige, 2002) (compilation of The Concert McDuff + one track from Hallelujah Time!, two tracks from The Midnight Sun, and one track from I Got A Woman)
- The Last Goodun' (Prestige, 2002) (compilation drawn from seven different McDuff albums; material on first seven tracks [the On With It! session] recorded December 1961)
- Funk Pie (Recall [UK], 2002) [2CD] (compilation of Concord material)
- The Best Of The Concord Years (Concord Jazz, 2003)
- Prelude: Jack McDuff Big Band (Prestige, 2003) (compilation of Prelude + 11 bonus tracks featuring McDuff's "large" groups, drawn from five different albums)
- Willis Jackson With Jack McDuff – Together Again! (Prestige, 2003) (compilation of Together Again! + Together Again, Again)
- The Prestige Years (Prestige, 2004) (compilation drawn from ten different McDuff albums)
- Jack McDuff: Eight Classic Albums (Real Gone Jazz [EU], 2013) [4CD] (compilation of Brother Jack; Tough 'Duff; The Honeydripper; Goodnight, It's Time To Go; Kirk's Work; Brother Jack Meets The Boss; Screamin'; Stitt Meets Brother Jack)
- Brother Jack McDuff: The Classic Albums 1960–1963 (Enlightenment [EU], 2020) [4CD] (compilation of The Honeydripper; Goodnight, It's Time To Go; Screamin'; Somethin' Slick!; Crash!; Brother Jack McDuff Live!; Brother Jack At The Jazz Workshop Live!; Prelude)
- Brother Jack McDuff/George Benson Quartet: The Legendary 1963–64 Concerts (Fingerpoppin' [EU], 2024) [2CD] (compilation of Brother Jack McDuff Live!; Brother Jack at the Jazz Workshop Live!; The Concert McDuff)

=== As sideman ===
With Gene Ammons

- Twisting the Jug (Prestige, 1961) -with Joe Newman [note: reissued on Groove Hut (#66721) in 2015]
- Soul Summit (Prestige, 1962) -with Sonny Stitt [note: reissued on Groove Hut (#66721) in 2015]
- Soul Summit Vol. 2 (Prestige, 1961-1962 [rel. 1963]) -with Etta Jones

With George Benson

- The New Boss Guitar of George Benson (Prestige, 1964) -with Red Holloway, Joe Dukes

With Joshua Breakstone

- Remembering Grant Green (Evidence, 1993 [rel. 1996])

With Kenny Burrell

- Bluesin' Around (Columbia, 1962 [rel. 1983])

With Hank Crawford

- Double Cross (Atlantic, 1968)

With King Curtis

- Old Gold (Tru-Sound, 1961)

With Lou Donaldson

- A Man with a Horn (Blue Note, 1961 [rel. 1999])

With Joe Dukes

- The Soulful Drums of Joe Dukes (Prestige, 1964) -with Red Holloway, George Benson

With Grant Green

- Grantstand (Blue Note, 1961) -with Yusef Lateef

With Al Grey

- Me 'N' Jack (Pullen Music, 1996) -with Jerry Weldon

With Roy Hargrove

- The Vibe (Novus, 1992)

With Gene Harris

- Alley Cats [live] (Concord, 1998 [rel. 1999])

With Willis Jackson

- "Good To The Bone" b/w "Making It" (Fire, 1959) -with Bill Jennings
- Please Mr. Jackson [also released as Cool Grits] (Prestige, 1959) -with Bill Jennings
- Cool "Gator" [also released as Keep On A Blowin' ] (Prestige, 1960) -with Bill Jennings
- Blue Gator (Prestige, 1960) -with Bill Jennings
- Cookin' Sherry (Prestige, rec. 1959/1960 [rel. 1961]) -with Bill Jennings
- Together Again! (Prestige, rec. 1959/1960 [rel. 1965]) -with Bill Jennings
- Together Again, Again (Prestige, rec. 1959/1960/1961 [rel. 1966]) -with Bill Jennings
- The Best of Willis Jackson With Brother Jack McDuff (Prestige 7702, 1969)

With Etta James and Eddie "Cleanhead" Vinson

- Blues in the Night Volume One: The Early Show (Fantasy, 1986) -with Red Holloway, Shuggie Otis
- The Late Show: Blues in the Night Volume 2 (Fantasy, 1987) -with Red Holloway, Shuggie Otis

With Bill Jennings

- Enough Said! (Prestige, 1959)
- Glide On (Prestige, 1960)

With Roland Kirk

- Kirk's Work (Prestige, 1961)

With Carmen McRae

- Fine and Mellow: Live at Birdland West (Concord, 1987) -with Red Holloway, Phil Upchurch

With Mike Pachelli

- Meeting Point (Fullblast, 1999)

With Houston Person

- The Real Thing [live] (Eastbound, 1973) 2LP

With Betty Roché

- Singin' & Swingin' (Prestige, 1960) -with Jimmy Forrest, Bill Jennings

With Shakey Jake

- Good Times (Bluesville, 1960)

With Dave Specter

- Left Turn On Blue (Delmark, 1995) -with Lynwood Slim

With Sonny Stitt

- Soul Shack (Prestige, 1963) [note: reissued on Groove Hut (#66718) in 2013]
- The Best of Sonny Stitt With Brother Jack McDuff (Prestige 7701, 1969)
- The Best of Sonny Stitt With Brother Jack McDuff/For Lovers (Prestige 7769, 1970)

With Winston Walls

- Boss of the B3 (Schoolkids, 1993)

With Joe Williams

- Nothin' but the Blues (Delos, 1983) -with Red Holloway, Eddie "Cleanhead" Vinson, Phil Upchurch

With Jimmy Witherspoon

- The Blues Is Now (Verve, 1967) -with Melvin Sparks

With Kankawa

- Organ Meeting (What'sNew Records, 2001) [Rec. Live in Tokyo, 2000]
