= Harold Ousley =

American jazz musician

- Born: Harold Lomax Ousley; January 23, 1929; Chicago, Illinois, U.S.
- Died: August 13, 2015 (aged 86) Brooklyn, New York, U.S.
- Genres: Jazz
- Instruments: Flute, tenor saxophone

Harold Lomax Ousley (January 23, 1929 – August 13, 2015) was an American jazz tenor saxophonist and flautist. He was also a composer and writer of works.

== Background ==
Born in Chicago, Ousley began playing in the late-1940s and 1950s. He accompanied Billie Holiday and recorded with Dinah Washington. He played as a sideman with Gene Ammons in the 1950s and with Jack McDuff and George Benson in the 1960s. He released his first record as a leader in 1961. He was active as a composer and wrote the soul jazz tune "Return Of The Prodigal Son", covered by Ray Bryant, Freddie Hubbard and Stanley Turrentine among others. In the 1970s, he played with Lionel Hampton and Count Basie in addition to releasing further material as a leader. After 1977, he did not release another album under his own name until Grit-Grittin' Feelin' (2000). Ousley died on August 13, 2015, in Brooklyn.

== Discography ==
=== As leader ===
- Tenor Sax (Bethlehem, 1961)
- The Kid! (Cobblestone, 1972)
- The People's Groove (Muse, 1977)
- Sweet Double Hipness (Muse, 1980)
- That's When We Thought of Love (J's Way Records, 1986)
- Grit-Grittin' Feelin' (Delmark, 2000)

=== As sideman ===
With Jack McDuff

- Walk On By (Prestige, 1966)
- Hallelujah Time! (Prestige, 1963–1966 [1967])
- Soul Circle (Prestige, 1964–1966 [1968])
- I Got a Woman (Prestige, 1964–1966 [1969])
- Steppin' Out (Prestige, 1961–1966 [1969])
