= Lew Futterman =

American record producer and manager

Lewis Futterman is an American record producer and manager, who was most active in the 1960s to the early 1980s. Commencing as of 1977, he has increasingly been involved in real estate development, primarily in New York City.

== History ==
Following graduation from Cornell University, Futterman was initially a producer for Prestige Records. He later became an independent producer, with a portfolio of jazz, soul and rock artists and bands he managed, or whose recordings he produced, including Jay and the Americans, Benny Golson, Jimmy Witherspoon, Jack McDuff, J.J. Jackson, George Benson, Ted Nugent and the British jazz-rock band If.

In 1970, he joined forces with UK club owner Stuart Lyon, to form Stuart Lyon Associates, a company which represented, among other groups, Aquila, J.J. Jackson's Dilemma, If and Curved Air. From the mid-1970s through the early 1980s, Futterman focused primarily on rock music. His production company was responsible for Ted Nugent's hit albums during that period.

During that time, he also became involved in residential real estate development and, by 2017, had been the developer or co-developer of over 1,000 residential units in Manhattan and Los Angeles. Included in those developments were the 114 unit Opera Coops on the Upper West Side, and the 217 Unit Fifth on the Park condominiums. He is still active in LA Coastal development. Also, from 1985 through the early 1990s, Futterman opened two restaurants, Andiamo in the Lincoln Center area and L'Ostello in Vail, Colorado.
