= Billy James (drummer) =

American jazz musician (1936–2009)

- Born: William James; April 20, 1936; Pittsburgh, Pennsylvania, U.S.
- Died: November 20, 2009 (aged 73) Philadelphia, Pennsylvania, U.S.
- Genres: Jazz
- Instruments: Drums

William "Billy" James (April 20, 1936 – November 20, 2009) was an American jazz drummer.

== Early life ==
James was born and raised in Pittsburgh. He began performing jazz at the age of 15.

== Career ==
James worked with Lionel Hampton and Booker Ervin in the 1950s, and in the early 1960s with James Moody, Candido Camero, Gene Ammons, Sonny Stitt, Don Patterson, and Eddie "Lockjaw" Davis. He and Patterson frequently recorded as a duo. James led his own groups in the latter half of the 1960s and worked further with Stitt during this time as well as with Eric Kloss. Later associations include Eddie Harris and Houston Person.

== Discography ==
With Eddie Harris

- Instant Death (Atlantic, 1971)
- Eddie Harris Sings the Blues (Atlantic, 1972)
- Excursions (Atlantic, 1973)
- Is It In (Atlantic, 1973)

With Don Patterson

- Goin' Down Home (Cadet, 1963 [1966])
- The Exciting New Organ of Don Patterson (Prestige, 1964)
- Hip Cake Walk (Prestige, 1964)
- Patterson's People (Prestige, 1964)
- Holiday Soul (Prestige, 1964)
- Satisfaction! (Prestige, 1965)
- The Boss Men (Prestige, 1965)
- Soul Happening! (Prestige, 1966)
- Mellow Soul (Prestige, 1967)
- Four Dimensions (Prestige, 1967)
- Boppin' & Burnin' (Prestige, 1968)
- Opus De Don (Prestige, 1968)
- Funk You! (Prestige, 1968)
- Brothers-4 (Prestige, 1969)
- Donny Brook (Prestige, 1969)
- Tune Up! (Prestige, 1971)
- Movin' Up! (Muse, 1977)

With Sonny Stitt

- Boss Tenors in Orbit! (Verve, 1962) -with Gene Ammons
- Feelin's... (Roost, 1962)
- Low Flame (Jazzland, 1962)
- Shangri-La (Prestige, 1964)
- Soul People (Prestige, 1964)
- Night Crawler (Prestige, 1965)
- Deuces Wild (Atlantic, 1966)
- Made for Each Other (Delmark, 1968 [1972])
- Soul Electricity! (Prestige, 1968)
- It's Magic (Delmark, 1969 [2005])
- Just The Way It Was (Live At The Left Bank) (Label M, 1971 [2000])

With others

- Legends Of Acid Jazz: Gene Ammons (Prestige, 1997) -included as a CD bonus is the single, "I Can't Stop Loving You" b/w "My Babe" [Argo 5417], recorded in 1962 by Gene Ammons with the Don Patterson/Paul Weeden/Billy James trio, and later released on the various artists compilation The Soul Jazz Giants [Prestige 7791] in 1971.
- Eddie "Lockjaw" Davis, I Only Have Eyes for You (Prestige, 1962)
- Eddie "Lockjaw" Davis, Trackin' (Prestige, 1962)
- Eric Kloss, Introducing Eric Kloss (Prestige, 1965)
- Eric Kloss, Love and All That Jazz (Prestige, 1966)
- Houston Person, Heavy Juice (Muse, 1982)
- Shirley Scott/Don Patterson/Eddie "Lockjaw" Davis, Stompin' (Prestige, 1967)
- Clarence Wheeler, The New Chicago Blues (Atlantic, 1973)
- Various Artists, Blue Note Records Presents The Lost Sessions (Blue Note, 1999) -this compilation includes one track ("Lady Be Good") from the aborted Sonny Stitt/Dexter Gordon session (on 5/14//62) featuring the Don Patterson/Paul Weeden/Billy James trio.
- Gene Ludwig, The Groove ORGANization (Blues Leaf, 2002) -with Bob DeVos
- Bob DeVos, DeVos' Groove Guitar! (Blues Leaf, 2003) -with Gene Ludwig
- Dan Fogel, Soul Eyes (Laughing Waters, 2004) -with Tony Ventura (guitar)
