= Tune Up! =

Studio album by Don Patterson with Sonny Stitt
- Released: 1971
- Recorded: July 10 and August 25, 1964 and June 2 and September 15, 1969
- Studio: Van Gelder Studio, Englewood Cliffs, New Jersey
- Genre: Jazz
- Length: 33:33
- Label: Prestige; PR 7852
- Producer: Ozzie Cadena and Bob Porter

Don Patterson chronology
Donny Brook (1969)	Tune Up! (1971)	The Return of Don Patterson (1972)

Tune Up! is an album by organist Don Patterson featuring tracks recorded in 1964 and 1969 which was released by Prestige in 1971. The album features unreleased recordings from the sessions that also produced Hip Cake Walk, Patterson's People, Oh Happy Day, Brothers-4 and Donny Brook.

== Track listing ==
All compositions by Don Patterson except as noted

1. "Just Friends" (John Klenner, Sam M. Lewis) - 5:55
2. "Flyin' Home" (Lionel Hampton, Benny Goodman) - 10:20
3. "Tune Up" (Miles Davis) - 4:28
4. "Blues for Mom" - 12:50
- Recorded at Van Gelder Studio in Englewood Cliffs, New Jersey on July 10, 1964 (track 1), August 25, 1964 (track 2), June 2, 1969 (track 4) and September 15, 1969 (track 3)

== Personnel ==
- Don Patterson - organ
- Virgil Jones (track 4) - trumpet
- George Coleman (track 4), Booker Ervin (tracks 1 & 2), Houston Person (track 4), Sonny Stitt (track 2) - tenor saxophone
- Sonny Stitt (track 3) - alto saxophone
- Grant Green (track 3) - guitar
- Billy James (tracks 1–3), Frankie Jones (track 4) - drums
