= It's Magic (disambiguation) =

"It's Magic" is a 1947 song by Doris Day.

It's Magic may also refer to:

- It's Magic (Abbey Lincoln album), a 1958 album by Abbey Lincoln
- It's Magic (Jerry Vale album), a 1966 album by Jerry Vale
- It's Magic (Sonny Stitt album), a Sonny Stitt album recorded in 1969 but withheld until 2005
- It's Magic!, a 2014 album by Garou
- "It's Magic", a song by Don Patterson from the 1966 album Goin' Down Home
- "It's Magic", a song by Peter, Paul & Mary from the 2003 album In These Times
- "It's Magic", a song from the Kidsongs 1995 video: "Let's Put on a Show"
- "It's Magic", a song by Girls Aloud from the 2005 album Chemistry
- It's Magic (1948 film), a 1948 released in the U.S. as Romance on the High Seas

== See also ==
- Magic (disambiguation)
- "If It's Magic"
- "Jadu Hai Nasha Hai" (lit. 'It's Magic It's Addiction'), a song by M. M. Kreem and Shreya Ghoshal from the 2003 Indian film Jism
