= Donny Brook =

Album by Don Patterson

Studio album by Don Patterson with Sonny Stitt
- Released: 1970
- Recorded: September 15, 1969
- Studio: Van Gelder Studio, Englewood Cliffs, New Jersey
- Genre: Jazz
- Length: 38:12
- Label: Prestige; PR 7816
- Producer: Bob Porter

Don Patterson chronology
Brothers-4 (1969)	Donny Brook (1970)	Tune Up! (1964–69)

Sonny Stitt chronology
Brothers-4 (1969)	Donny Brook (1969)	Night Letter (1969)

Donny Brook is an album by organist Don Patterson with saxophonist Sonny Stitt recorded in 1969 and released on the Prestige label. The album features guitarist Grant Green who was credited as Blue Grant for contractual reasons, being then signed to Blue Note Records.

== Reception ==
Professional ratings
Review scores
Source	Rating
Allmusic	4/5 stars

Allmusic awarded the album 4 stars stating "It's good organ jazz, although not the best performances in this style from the three lead players".

== Track listing ==
All compositions by Don Patterson except as noted

No.	Title	Length
1.	"Donny Brook" (Grant Green)	8:25
2.	"Mud Turtle"	9:58
3.	"St. Thomas" (Sonny Rollins)	5:28
4.	"Good Bait" (Count Basie, Tadd Dameron)	8:31
5.	"Starry Night" (John H. Densmore)	5:50

== Personnel ==
- Don Patterson – organ
- Sonny Stitt – varitone, tenor saxophone
- Grant Green – guitar
- Billy James – drums
