= Turn It On! =

Studio album by Sonny Stitt
- Released: 1971
- Recorded: January 4, 1971
- Studio: Van Gelder Studio, Englewood Cliffs, New Jersey
- Genre: Jazz
- Length: 37:32
- Label: Prestige; PR-10012
- Producer: Bob Porter

Sonny Stitt chronology
Night Letter (1969)	Turn It On! (1971)	You Talk That Talk! (1971)

Professional ratings
Review scores
Source	Rating
Allmusic	3/5 stars
The Rolling Stone Jazz Record Guide	3/5 stars

Turn It On! is an album by saxophonist Sonny Stitt recorded in 1971 and released on the Prestige label. The album features Stitt using the varitone, an electronic amplification device which altered the saxophone's sound.

== Reception ==
Allmusic reviewed the album, stating, "Stitt uses an electrical device (a Varitone) on his tenor that waters down his tone a bit. With organist Leon Spencer, guitarist Melvin Sparks and drummer Idris Muhammad setting down unrelenting grooves on most of the five numbers (including the 11-minute title cut), Stitt only seems to be making cameo appearances".

== Track listing ==
All compositions by Leon Spencer except where noted

1. "Turn It On" - 11:10
2. "The Bar-B-Que Man" - 7:59
3. "Miss Riverside" - 9:28
4. "Cry Me a River" (Arthur Hamilton) - 3:54
5. "There Are Such Things" (Stanley Adams, Abel Baer, George W. Meyer) - 4:01

== Personnel ==
- Sonny Stitt - tenor saxophone, varitone
- Virgil Jones - trumpet (tracks 1–3)
- Leon Spencer Jr. - organ
- Melvin Sparks - guitar
- Idris Muhammad - drums
