= Dick Vance =

American musician

- Born: Richard Thomas Vance; November 28, 1915; Mayfield, Kentucky, U.S.
- Died: July 27, 1985 (aged 69) New York City, New York, U.S.
- Genres: Jazz
- Occupations: Musician; composer
- Instruments: Trumpet, Vocals

Dick Vance (November 28, 1915 – July 31, 1985) was an American jazz trumpeter and arranger.

== Biography ==
Richard Thomas Vance was born in Mayfield, Kentucky, and raised in Cleveland, Ohio, where he learned violin before concentrating on trumpet. He played in Cleveland with J. Frank Terry (1932) before joining Lil Armstrong's band in 1934. He moved to New York City and played with Willie Bryant, Kaiser Marshall, and Fletcher Henderson (1936–38); in Henderson's band he was lead trumpeter and occasionally sang. In 1939, he joined Chick Webb's orchestra, and remained in the group when Ella Fitzgerald took over leadership. Upon the disbanding of the Webb band, Vance became the staff arranger for Glen Grey's band and, in 1942, joined the Lucky Millinder Orchestra. Following this he worked with Charlie Barnet, Don Redman, Eddie Heywood (1944–45), and Ben Webster. From 1944 to 1947 he studied at Juilliard, and moonlighted as a pit orchestra musician and an arranger for artists Harry James, Cab Calloway, Earl Hines and Duke Ellington. During this time he played on notable Broadway productions including Pal Joey, Beggar's Holiday, and in the off-stage band for Streetcar Named Desire. In 1950, Vance reunited with his former band leader, Fletcher Henderson, and played in his New York-based sextet (this was actually Henderson's last public engagement before his death). 1951 to 1952 Dick Vance was a member of Duke Ellington's band's trumpet section where he arranged most of the items for the album Ellington ‘55. In 1958 he co-composed "Jazz Festival Suite" with Ellington for performance at the Newport Jazz Festival. Vance led Sonny Stitt's trumpet section on the album Sonny Stitt & the Top Brass (recorded in 1962). He toured abroad with his own band in 1969, which later appeared (1970) in the film L’aventure du jazz.

He toured with Redman in 1953 and was a regular at the Savoy Ballroom throughout the 1950s. He released two albums in the 1960s and toured with Eddie Barefield in 1969.

He appears briefly in episode 9 of the music documentary series All You Need Is Love: The Story of Popular Music. In 1979, he was cited as the composer for the documentary film No Maps on My Taps, starring Lionel Hampton and Howard Sims.

Vance died in New York City in July 1985, at the age of 69.

== Discography ==
- Duke Ellington, Liberian Suite (CBS, 1973)
- Eddie Heywood Jr., Eddie Heywood at the Piano and His Orchestra Lightly and Politely (Decca, 1956)
- Ella Fitzgerald, Webb On the Air (Jazz Trip, 1970)
- Ella Fitzgerald, Newport Jazz Festival Live at Carnegie Hall July 5, 1973 (CBS, 1973)
- Ella Fitzgerald, Live from the Roseland Ballroom New York 1940 (Sunbeam, 1974)
- Fletcher Henderson, The Complete Fletcher Henderson 1927–1936 (RCA/Bluebird, 1976)
- Fletcher Henderson All Stars/Rex Stewart, The Big Reunion (Jazztone, 1958)
- Mary Lou Williams, Mary Lou Williams and Orchestra (Stinson, 1962)
- Paul Quinichette, Like Who? (United Artists, 1959)
- Sonny Stitt, Sonny Stitt & the Top Brass (Atlantic, 1962)
