= Little Angie =

Little Angie may refer to:

- "Little Angie", a song by Don Patterson on the album Funk You!
- Angelo "Little Angie" Tuminaro, a mafia member involved with the French Connection
- Angelo Rossitto (1908–1991), American actor and voice artist
