= Soul Electricity! =

Studio album by Sonny Stitt
- Released: 1968
- Recorded: September 23, 1968
- Studio: Van Gelder Studio, Englewood Cliffs, New Jersey
- Genre: Jazz
- Length: 39:14
- Label: Prestige; PR-7635
- Producer: Don Schlitten

Sonny Stitt chronology
Made for Each Other (1968)	Soul Electricity! (1968)	Little Green Apples (1968)

Soul Electricity! is an album by saxophonist Sonny Stitt recorded in 1968 and released on the Prestige label. The album features Stitt using the varitone, an electronic amplification device which altered the saxophone's sound.

== Reception ==
Professional ratings
Review scores
Source	Rating
Allmusic	3/5 stars
DownBeat	4/5 stars
The Rolling Stone Jazz Record Guide	3/5 stars

Allmusic awarded the album 3 stars stating: "The album gets its name because for this session, Stitt plugged his alto and tenor saxophones into a Varitone attachment. What came out, though, was not fusion by any means, but a pretty straight-ahead session that found Sonny his usual competent self. The program is actually on the conservative side, leaning toward standards".

== Track listing ==
1. "All the Things You Are" (Oscar Hammerstein II, Jerome Kern) - 5:58
2. "Lover Man" (Jimmy Davis, Roger "Ram" Ramirez, Jimmy Sherman) - 3:25
3. "P.S. I Love You" (Gordon Jenkins, Johnny Mercer) - 5:35
4. "Stella by Starlight" (Ned Washington, Victor Young) - 5:24
5. "Bye Bye Blackbird" (Mort Dixon, Ray Henderson) - 5:33
6. "Over the Rainbow" (Harold Arlen, Yip Harburg) - 3:57
7. "Candy" (Mack David, Alex Kramer, Joan Whitney) - 5:50
8. "Strike Up the Band" (George Gershwin, Ira Gershwin) - 3:30

== Personnel ==
- Sonny Stitt - alto saxophone, tenor saxophone, varitone
- Don Patterson - organ
- Billy Butler - guitar
- Billy James - drums
