= Sonny Stitt Plays =

Studio album by Sonny Stitt
- Released: 1956
- Recorded: December 15–16, 1955
- Studio: Capitol Studios, New York City
- Genre: Jazz
- Label: Roost; RLP 2208
- Producer: Teddy Reig

Sonny Stitt chronology
| Sonny Stitt Plays Arrangements from the Pen of Quincy Jones (1955) | Sonny Stitt Plays (1956) | New York Jazz (1956) |

Professional ratings
Review scores
| Source | Rating |
|---|---|
| Allmusic | 3/5 stars |

Sonny Stitt Plays (also referred to as Sonny Stitt, Sonny Stitt, Sonny Stitt, Sonny Stitt, Sonny Stitt) is an album by saxophonist Sonny Stitt recorded in 1955 and originally released on the Roost label.

== Reception ==
The Allmusic site awarded the album 3 stars.

== Track listing ==
All compositions by Sonny Stitt except as indicated

1. "There Will Never Be Another You" (Harry Warren, Mack Gordon) – 4:33
2. "The Nearness of You" (Hoagy Carmichael, Ned Washington) – 5:08
3. "Biscuit Mix (Carpsie's Groove)" – 3:14
4. "Yesterdays" (Jerome Kern, Otto Harbach) – 4:56
5. "Afterwards" – 3:14
6. "If I Should Lose You" (Ralph Rainger, Leo Robin) – 4:15
7. "Blues for Bobby" – 4:48
8. "My Melancholy Baby" (Ernie Burnett, George A. Norton) 5:36
9. "The Nearness Of You" [alternate take] (Carmichael, Washington) – 5:22 Bonus track on CD reissue
10. "If I Should Lose You" [alternate take] (Rainger, Robin) – 4:29 Bonus track on CD reissue
- Recorded at Capitol Studios in New York City on December 15 (tracks 1–4 & 9) and December 16 (tracks 5–8 & 10), 1955
- The Bonus tracks must be from the box set. They are not on the current Japanese Import CD

== Personnel ==
- Sonny Stitt – alto saxophone
- Hank Jones – piano
- Freddie Green – rhythm guitar (tracks 1–4 & 9)
- Wendell Marshall – bass
- Shadow Wilson – drums
