= The Matadors Meet the Bull =

Studio album by Sonny Stitt
- Released: 1965
- Recorded: 1965
- Genre: Jazz
- Label: Roulette; SR-25339
- Producer: Henry Glover

Sonny Stitt chronology
Sax Expressions (1965)	The Matadors Meet the Bull (1965)	Pow! (1965)

The Matadors Meet the Bull is an album by saxophonist Sonny Stitt recorded in 1965 and released on the Roulette label. The album was Stitt's first for the label; he had recorded many albums for Roost which Roulette had taken over.

== Reception ==
Professional ratings
Review scores
Source	Rating
Allmusic	3/5 stars

Allmusic awarded the album 3 stars.

== Track listing ==
All compositions by Henry Glover and Morris Levy except as indicated

1. "Duketation" - 3:54
2. "T'wana" - 4:46
3. "Icey Stone" - 2:37
4. "Pink Gloves 2:12
5. "Let My People Split" - 4:55
6. "Samba de Orfeo" (Luiz Bonfá) - 3:02
7. "Liberian Love Song" - 2:29
8. "Handkerchief Head" - 2:40
9. "Stitt's Song" (Sonny Stitt) - 7:45

== Personnel ==
- Sonny Stitt - alto saxophone, tenor saxophone
- Joe Newman, Clark Terry - trumpet, flugelhorn
- Urbie Green, J. J. Johnson - trombone
- Eddie "Lockjaw" Davis - tenor saxophone
- George Berg - baritone saxophone
- Junior Mance, Billy Taylor - piano
- Wild Bill Davis - organ
- Barry Galbraith, Les Spann - guitar
- Milt Hinton, Eddie Sanfranski - bass
- Walter Perkins - drums
- Ray Barretto - congas
- Joe Cuba, Tito Puente - timbales
