= Parallel-a-Stitt =

Studio album by Sonny Stitt
- Released: 1967
- Recorded: 1967
- Genre: Jazz
- Label: Roulette; SR-25354
- Producer: Henry Glover

Sonny Stitt chronology
Deuces Wild (1966)	Parallel-a-Stitt (1967)	Made for Each Other (1968)

Parallel-a-Stitt (subtitled Sonny Stitt on the Varitone) is an album by saxophonist Sonny Stitt recorded in 1967 and released on the Roulette label. The album represents Stitt's third featuring the varitone, an electronic amplification device which altered the saxophone's sound.

== Reception ==
Professional ratings
Review scores
Source	Rating
Allmusic	3/5 stars

Allmusic awarded the album 3 stars.

== Track listing ==
All compositions by Sonny Stitt except as indicated

1. "Hello George" - 3:25
2. "Don't Get Around Much Anymore" (Duke Ellington) - 5:02
3. "Bye Bye Blackbird" (Ray Henderson, Mort Dixon) - 4:27
4. "Because It's Love" - 2:35
5. "Satin Doll" (Ellington, Billy Strayhorn, Johnny Mercer) - 4:40
6. "The Shadow of Your Smile" (Johnny Mandel, Paul Francis Webster) - 5:18
7. "Chinatown My Chinatown" (William Jerome, Jean Schwartz) - 3:45
8. "Jeep's Blues" (Ellington, Johnny Hodges) - 2:09
9. "Laura" (David Raksin, Mercer) - 2:45

== Personnel ==
- Sonny Stitt - alto saxophone, tenor saxophone, varitone
- Jerome Richardson - alto flute
- George Berg - baritone saxophone
- Don Patterson - organ
- George Duvivier - bass
- Walter Jones - drums
