= Inter-Action =

Studio album by Sonny Stitt and Zoot Sims
- Released: 1965
- Recorded: January 25, 1965
- Studio: Ter Mar Recording Studios, Chicago, Illinois
- Genre: Jazz
- Length: 34:58
- Label: Cadet; LP-760
- Producer: Esmond Edwards

Sonny Stitt chronology
Soul People (1964)	Inter-Action (1965)	Broadway Soul (1965)

Zoot Sims chronology
Two Jims and Zoot (1964)	Inter-Action (1965)	Suitably Zoot (1965)

Inter-Action is an album by saxophonists Sonny Stitt and Zoot Sims recorded in Chicago in 1965 and released on the Cadet label.

== Reception ==
Professional ratings
Review scores
Source	Rating
Allmusic	4.5/5 stars

Allmusic awarded the album 4½ stars calling it "consistently swinging".

== Track listing ==
All compositions by Sonny Stitt except where noted.

1. "My Blue Heaven" (Walter Donaldson, George A. Whiting) - 8:01
2. "The Saber" - 3:06
3. "Katea" - 6:38
4. "Fools Rush In" (Rube Bloom, Johnny Mercer) - 5:29
5. "Look Down That Lonesome Road" (Traditional) - 7:20
6. "I Want to Go Home" - 4:24

== Personnel ==
- Sonny Stitt - alto saxophone, tenor saxophone
- Zoot Sims - tenor saxophone
- John Young - piano
- Sam Kidd - bass
- Phil Thomas - drums
