= What's New!!! =

Studio album by Sonny Stitt
- Released: 1966
- Recorded: June 1966
- Genre: Jazz
- Labels: Roulette; SR-25343
- Producer: Henry Glover

Sonny Stitt chronology
| Soul in the Night (1966) | What's New!!! (1966) | I Keep Comin' Back! (1966) |

What's New!!! (subtitled Sonny Stitt Plays the Varitone) is an album by saxophonist Sonny Stitt recorded in 1966 and released on the Roulette label. The album represents Stitt's first recorded use of the varitone, an electronic amplification device which altered the saxophone's sound.

== Background ==
As used by Stitt, the varitone was operated by using four switches and three knobs (the latter for volume, suboctave volume and echo) on its control unit to create 60 new sounds, allowing the instrument to reach a lower octave than a tenor saxophone, as well as to allow tremolo and, via octaves, self-accompaniment with a duplicated string bass effect. Stitt was introduced to the varitone in June 1966 in Chicago and was impressed by its unique tone; he bought a varitone several days later. With What's New!!!, he became the first musician to record an LP with the device on his saxophone.

== Reception ==
Professional ratings
Review scores
| Source | Rating |
|---|---|
| AllMusic | 3/5 stars |

What's New!!! reached number 172 on the Billboard 200 in April 1967 and number 16 on the Jazz Albums chart. AllMusic awarded the album 3 stars.

Among contemporary reviewers of What's New!!!, David F. Wagner of the Sunday Post-Crescent highlighted the varitone as the first electrified wind instrument, and the album as "the initial recording" of the device, calling it an "amazing invention." Wagner hailed the device for not merely amplifying the saxophone but changing the instrument's entire tone to something deeper and richer, yet "obviously artificial" in some moments, and believed it removed needing to hire an electronic technician to manipulate the recording after the fact. Wagner contended that What's New!! "is not really a jazz album. It is more a demonstration disc, designed to show the versatility of the new sax."

A reviewer for The Courier praised the varitone sound on the album as "new, exciting and truly revolutionary." As well as praising Stitt's desire to improvise and try new techniques, the reviewer noted how the record's "big band sound" features some of the best-known jazz musicians, concluding that listeners will find themselves "listening with rapt attention to the new and different music coming from Sonny Stitt and his saxophone."

== Track listing ==
All compositions by Sonny Stitt except as indicated

1. "What's New?" (Bob Haggart, Johnny Burke) - 2:20
2. "Jumpin' with Symphony Sid" (Lester Young) - 3:55
3. "Stardust" (Hoagy Carmichael, Mitchell Parish) - 6:06
4. "Cocktails for Two" (Arthur Johnston, Sam Coslow) - 3:28
5. "Georgia" (Carmichael, Stuart Gorrell) - 4:11
6. "Mame" (Jerry Herman) - 2:10
7. "Morgan's Song" - 2:31
8. "Fever" (Eddie Cooley, John Davenport) - 2:05
9. "Round About Midnight" (Thelonious Monk) - 3:12
10. "I've Got the World on a String" (Harold Arlen, Ted Koehler) - 4:17
11. "If I Didn't Care" (Jack Lawrence) - 4:50
12. "The Beastly Blues" - 4:50

== Personnel ==
- Sonny Stitt - alto saxophone, tenor saxophone, varitone
- Joe Wilder, Eddie Preston - trumpet
- J. J. Johnson - trombone
- Illinois Jacquet - tenor saxophone
- George Berg - baritone saxophone
- Billy Taylor, Ellis Larkins - piano
- Wild Bill Davis, Ernie Hayes - organ
- Mike Mainieri - vibraphone
- Les Spann - guitar
- Jan Arnet, George Duvivier - bass
- Walter Perkins - drums
