= Soul Shack =

Studio album by Sonny Stitt with Jack McDuff
- Released: December 1963
- Recorded: September 17, 1963
- Studio: Van Gelder Studio, Englewood Cliffs, NJ
- Genre: Jazz blues
- Length: 39:24
- Label: Prestige; PRLP 7297

Sonny Stitt chronology
Salt and Pepper (1963)	Soul Shack (1963)	Stitt Goes Latin (1963)

Soul Shack is an album by American saxophonist Sonny Stitt and organist Jack McDuff, recorded in 1963 and issued on Prestige. If Primitivo Soul!, recorded in December of the same year, features mostly Latin-influenced jazz, Soul Shack features strong blues influences.

Professional ratings
Review scores
Source	Rating
Allmusic	3/5 stars

== Track listing ==
All compositions by Sonny Stitt except where noted

1. "Sunday" (Chester Conn, Jule Styne, Bennie Krueger, Ned Miller) - 7:55
2. "Soul Shack" - 7:14
3. "Love Nest" (Louis Hirsch, Otto Harbach) - 6:17
4. "Hairy" - 5:56
5. "For You" (Joe Burke, Al Dubin) - 6:55
6. "Shadows" - 5:07

== Personnel ==
- Sonny Stitt - alto saxophone (tracks 4 and 6) tenor saxophone (tracks 1, 2, 3 and 5)
- Brother Jack McDuff - organ
- Leonard Gaskin - bass
- Herbie Lovelle - drums
