= Made for Each Other (Sonny Stitt album) =

Studio album by Sonny Stitt
- Released: 1972
- Recorded: July 13, 1968
- Studio: P.S. Studios, Chicago
- Genre: Jazz
- Length: 41:18
- Label: Delmark; DS 426
- Producer: Robert G. Koester, Joe Segal

Sonny Stitt chronology
Parallel-a-Stitt (1967)	Made for Each Other (1972)	Soul Electricity! (1968)

Made for Each Other is an album by saxophonist Sonny Stitt recorded in 1968 but not released by the Delmark label until 1972. The album represents Stitt's fourth recording featuring the varitone, an electronic amplification device which altered the saxophone's sound.

== Reception ==
Professional ratings
Review scores
Source	Rating
Allmusic	2/5 stars
The Penguin Guide to Jazz Recordings	2/4 stars

Allmusic reviewer Scott Yanow stated "Sonny Stitt's regular group of the period plays a wide variety of material ... Unfortunately the set is from the period when Stitt often used a Varitone electronic attachment on his alto and tenor which gave him a much more generic sound, lowering the quality of this music despite some strong improvisations. It is an okay set that could have been better". In JazzTimes Patricia Myers wrote "Alto and tenor giant Sonny Stitt always could burn a bebop riff like his idol, Charlie Parker. In this 1968 studio session, Stitt is in perfect sync with ever-grooving organist Don Patterson and tasty drummer Billy James".

== Track listing ==
1. "Samba de Orpheus" (Luiz Bonfá, Antônio Maria, Andre Michel Salvet) – 4:37
2. "Funny (Tenor)" (Philip Broughton, Bob Merrill, Marcia Neil, Hughie Prince) – 2:58
3. "Glory of Love" (Billy Hill) – 5:23
4. "The Very Thought of You" (Ray Noble) – 5:43
5. "Blues for J.J." (Sonny Stitt) – 4:42
6. "Funny (Alto)" (Broughton, Merrill, Neil, Prince) – 3:02
7. "The Night Has a Thousand Eyes" (Jerry Brainin, Buddy Bernier) – 5:26
8. "Honey" (Bobby Russell) – 3:55
9. "The Night Has a Thousand Eyes" [alternate take] (Brainin, Bernier) – 5:32 Additional track on CD reissue

== Personnel ==
- Sonny Stitt - alto saxophone, tenor saxophone, varitone
- Don Patterson - organ
- Billy James - drums
