= Stitt Goes Latin =

Studio album by Sonny Stitt
- Released: 1963
- Recorded: November 6, 1963
- Studio: A & R Studios, New York City
- Genre: Jazz
- Label: Roost; RLP 2253
- Producer: Teddy Reig

Sonny Stitt chronology
Soul Shack (1963)	Stitt Goes Latin (1963)	Primitivo Soul! (1963)

Professional ratings
Review scores
Source	Rating
Allmusic	3/5 stars

Stitt Goes Latin is an album by saxophonist Sonny Stitt recorded in 1963 and originally released on the Roost label.

== Reception ==
The Allmusic site awarded the album 3 stars.

== Track listing ==
All compositions by Sonny Stitt except as indicated

1. "Are You Listening" - 3:30
2. "Amigos" - 4:36
3. "My Little Suede Shoes" (Charlie Parker) - 4:04
4. "Ritmo Bobo" - 6:02
5. "I Told You So" - 5:20
6. "Chic" - 5:13
7. "Senor Jones" - 5:10
8. "Autumn Leaves" (Joseph Kosma, Jacques Prévert, Johnny Mercer) - 5:32

== Personnel ==
- Sonny Stitt - alto saxophone, tenor saxophone
- Thad Jones - trumpet
- Chick Corea - piano
- Larry Gales - bass
- Willie Bobo - drums
- Carlos "Patato" Valdes - congas, bongos
- Osvaldo "Chihuahua" Martinez - cowbell, maracas, jawbone
