= Soul People (album) =

1965 studio album by Sonny Stitt, Booker Ervin & Don Patterson

Studio album by Sonny Stitt With Booker Ervin & Don Patterson
- Released: Early September 1965
- Recorded: August 25, 1964 (#1–5); August 5, 1966 (#7); September 15, 1969 (#6)
- Studio: Van Gelder Studio, Englewood Cliffs, NJ
- Genre: Jazz blues
- Length: 40:12 original LP; 62:44 CD reissue
- Label: Prestige; PRLP 7372
- Producer: Ozzie Cadena (#1–5); Bob Porter (#6); Cal Lampley (#7)

Sonny Stitt chronology
Shangri-La (1964)	Soul People (1965)	Sax Expressions (1965)

Alternative cover
- 1993 CD reissue

Soul People is an album by American saxophonists Sonny Stitt and Booker Ervin, and organist Don Patterson. Just like his previous Soul Shack, Soul People features heavily blues-drenched jazz. The original album was recorded in 1964 and issued by Prestige in early 1965. In 1993, it was reissued on CD by Prestige, featuring three additional tracks.

Professional ratings
Review scores
Source	Rating
Allmusic	4.5/5 stars
The Rolling Stone Jazz Record Guide	4/5 stars
The Penguin Guide to Jazz Recordings	3/4 stars

== Track listing ==
Original LP

1. "Soul People" (Stitt) - 9:59
2. "Sonny's Book" (Stitt) - 8:57
3. "C Jam Blues" (Ellington) - 10:00
4. "Medley: I Can't Get Started/The Masquerade Is Over" (Vernon Duke, Ira Gershwin/Herb Magidson, Allie Wrubel) - 11:16

Bonus tracks on CD reissue:

5. "Flying Home" (Goodman, Hampton, Robin) - 10:13
6. "Tune-Up (Davis) - 4:26
7. "There Will Never Be Another You" (Gordon, Warren) - 7:53 (previously unissued out-take from Don Patterson's Soul Happening! [PR 7484])

Tracks 1–5 recorded August 25, 1964; Track 6 recorded September 15, 1969; Track 7 recorded August 5, 1966. Note: tracks 5–6 previously issued on Don Patterson's Tune Up! [PR 7852].

== Personnel ==
Tracks 1–5

- Sonny Stitt - alto saxophone (2 and 4) tenor saxophone (1, 3 and 5)
- Booker Ervin - tenor saxophone
- Don Patterson - organ
- Billy James - drums

Track 6

- Sonny Stitt - alto saxophone
- Don Patterson - organ
- Grant Green - guitar
- Billy James - drums

Track 7

- Don Patterson - organ
- Vinnie Corrao - guitar
- Billy James - drums
