= You Talk That Talk! =

Studio album by Gene Ammons and Sonny Stitt
- Released: 1972
- Recorded: February 8, 1971
- Studio: Van Gelder Studio, Englewood Cliffs, New Jersey
- Genre: Jazz
- Length: 33:32
- Label: Prestige; PR 10019
- Producer: Bob Porter

Sonny Stitt chronology
Turn It On! (1971)	You Talk That Talk! (1972)	Black Vibrations (1971)

Gene Ammons chronology
The Black Cat! (1970)	You Talk That Talk! (1971)	My Way (1971)

Professional ratings
Review scores
Source	Rating
Allmusic	3/5 stars
The Rolling Stone Jazz Record Guide	4/5 stars

You Talk That Talk! is an album by saxophonists Gene Ammons and Sonny Stitt recorded in 1971 and released on the Prestige label.

== Reception ==
The Allmusic review stated "You Talk That Talk lacks the can-you-top-this cutting contest duels that the tenor saxophonists could occasionally engage in on-stage. Instead, a relaxed, swinging vibe prevails, as Stitt and Ammons trade choruses over a loose, funky backdrop".

== Track listing ==
1. "You Talk That Talk!" (Leon Spencer) – 5:55
2. "Body and Soul" (Frank Eyton, Johnny Green, Edward Heyman, Robert Sour) – 4:12
3. "The People's Choice" (Harold Ousley) – 6:55
4. "Katea" (Sonny Stitt) – 6:40
5. "The Sun Died" (Ray Charles, Hubert Giraud, Pierre Leroyer, André Gregory) – 4:40
6. "Out of It" (Harold Vick) – 5:00

== Personnel ==
- Gene Ammons – tenor saxophone (note: "The Sun Died" is a feature for Ammons only)
- Sonny Stitt – tenor saxophone, varitone (note: "Body and Soul" is a feature for Stitt only)
- Leon Spencer – organ
- George Freeman – guitar
- Idris Muhammad – drums
