= Stitt in Orbit =

Studio album by Sonny Stitt
- Released: 1963
- Recorded: August 8, 1960 and February–June 1962
- Studio: Bell Sound (New York City)
- Genre: Jazz
- Label: Roost; RLP 2252
- Producer: Teddy Reig

Sonny Stitt chronology
| Low Flame (1962) | Stitt in Orbit (1963) | Sonny Stitt & the Top Brass (1962) |

Professional ratings
Review scores
| Source | Rating |
|---|---|
| Allmusic | 3/5 stars |

Stitt in Orbit is an album by saxophonist Sonny Stitt recorded in 1960 and 1962 and originally released on the Roost label.

== Reception ==
The Allmusic site awarded the album 3 stars.

== Track listing ==
All compositions by Sonny Stitt

1. "No Cal"- 2:37
2. "Six-O-Seven Blues" - 6:07
3. "Beware Rocks Comin’ Down" - 6:52
4. "Corn Flakes" - 3:26
5. "Eye Ball" - 4:59
6. "Saginaw" - 5:15
- Recorded in New York City on August 8, 1960 (tracks 2 & 3) and between February and June 1962 (tracks 1 & 4–6)

== Personnel ==
- Sonny Stitt - alto saxophone, tenor saxophone
- Hank Jones (tracks 1 & 4–6), Jimmy Jones (tracks 2 & 3) - piano
- Aaron Bell (tracks 2 & 3), Tommy Potter (tracks 1 & 4–6) - bass
- Roy Haynes - drums
