= I Keep Comin' Back! =

Studio album by Sonny Stitt
- Released: 1966
- Recorded: 1966
- Genre: Jazz
- Label: Roulette; SR-25346
- Producer: Henry Glover

Sonny Stitt chronology
What's New!!! (1966)	I Keep Comin' Back! (1966)	Deuces Wild (1966)

I Keep Comin' Back! (subtitled Sonny Stitt on the Varitone) is an album by saxophonist Sonny Stitt recorded in 1966 and released on the Roulette label. The album represents Stitt's second album featuring the varitone, an electronic amplification device which altered the saxophone's sound.

== Reception ==
Professional ratings
Review scores
Source	Rating
Allmusic	3/5 stars

Allmusic awarded the album 3 stars.

== Track listing ==
1. "I Keep Coming Back for More" (Quincy Jones, Eddie Barclay, Johnny Lehmann) - 2:13
2. "Manhattan Fever" (Henry Glover, Morris Levy) - 2:19
3. "I Will Wait for You" (Michel Legrand) - 2:05
4. "Lullabye of Birdland" (George Shearing) - 4:21
5. "Swingin' Shepherd Blues" (Moe Koffman) – 2:40
6. "Quintessence" (Jones) - 3:59
7. "Sunrise, Sunset" (Jerry Bock, Sheldon Harnick) - 2:20
8. "Maybe" (Richard Barrett) - 6:45
9. "Yellow Rose of Texas" (Don George) -2:20

== Personnel ==
- Sonny Stitt - alto saxophone, tenor saxophone, varitone
- Joe Newman, Clark Terry - trumpet, flugelhorn
- Urbie Green, Dickie Harris - trombone
- Jerry Dodgion, Hank Freeman - alto saxophone
- Seldon Powell - tenor saxophone
- George Berg - baritone saxophone
- Ellis Larkins - piano
- Mike Mainieri - vibraphone
- Les Spann - guitar
- George Duvivier, Milt Hinton - bass
- Walter Perkins - drums
