= Rearin' Back =

Studio album by Sonny Stitt
- Released: 1962
- Recorded: September 24, 1962
- Studio: Ter-Mar Recording Studio, Chicago, Illinois
- Genre: Jazz
- Label: Argo; LP 709
- Producer: Esmond Edwards

Sonny Stitt chronology
Sonny Stitt & the Top Brass (1962)	Rearin' Back (1962)	Stitt Plays Bird (1963)

Professional ratings
Review scores
Source	Rating
Down Beat	4.5/5 stars
Allmusic	3/5 stars

Rearin' Back is an album by saxophonist Sonny Stitt recorded in 1962 and released on the Argo label.

== Reception ==
Down Beat magazine's Harvey Pekar said in his April 11, 1963 review that "Stitt solos brilliantly... Stitt conceives and executes extremely complex passages so easily that some have come to take his work for granted."

The Allmusic site awarded the album 3 stars.

== Track listing ==
All compositions by Sonny Stitt except as indicated

1. "Rearin' Back" - 5:15
2. "Wee" (aka Allen's Alley) (Denzil Best) - 4:04 (mistitled as the standard We on the original LP)
3. "Little Girl Blue" (Lorenz Hart, Richard Rodgers) - 3:34
4. "Cut Plug" - 4:13
5. "Queen" - 7:00
6. "Carpsie's Groove" - 6:10
7. "Bunny R." - 6:14

== Personnel ==
- Sonny Stitt - alto saxophone
- Ronnie Mathews - piano
- Arthur Harper - bass
- Lex Humphries - drums
