= These Are Soulful Days =

Studio album by Don Patterson
- Released: 1974
- Recorded: September 17, 1973; RCA Studios, New York City
- Genre: Jazz
- Length: 46:58
- Label: Muse; MR 5032
- Producer: Don Schlitten

Don Patterson chronology
The Return of Don Patterson (1972)	These Are Soulful Days (1974)	Movin' Up! (1977)

Professional ratings
Review scores
Source	Rating
Allmusic	4/5 stars

These Are Soulful Days is an album by organist Don Patterson recorded in 1973 and released on the Muse label.

== Reception ==
Allmusic awarded the album 4 stars with a review stating, "These Are Soulful Days is easily recommendable to fans of classic organ, guitar, sax combos, as well as to listeners who simply enjoy the playing of top-flight jazz musicians who have a healthy respect for the music's blues roots".

== Track listing ==
All compositions by Don Patterson except as indicated

1. "These Are Soulful Days" (Cal Massey) - 8:15
2. "Whistle While You Work" (Frank Churchill, Larry Morey) - 7:30
3. "Skylark" (Johnny Mercer, Hoagy Carmichael) - 9:12
4. "Blue 'n' Boogie" (Dizzy Gillespie, Frank Paparelli) - 4:06
5. "Muse Blues" - 17:55

== Personnel ==
- Don Patterson - organ
- Jimmy Heath - tenor saxophone
- Pat Martino - guitar
- Albert Heath - drums
