= My Main Man =

1964 studio album by Sonny Stitt and Bennie Green

Studio album by Sonny Stitt and Bennie Green
- Released: 1964
- Recorded: March 10–11, 1964
- Studio: Ter Mar, Chicago, Illinois
- Genre: Jazz
- Length: 34:56
- Label: Argo; LP-744
- Producer: Esmond Edwards

Sonny Stitt chronology
Primitivo Soul! (1963)	My Main Man (1964)	Shangri-La (1964)

My Main Man is an album by saxophonist Sonny Stitt and trombonist Bennie Green recorded in Chicago in 1964 and released on the Argo label.

== Reception ==
Professional ratings
Review scores
Source	Rating
AllMusic	4.5/5 stars

AllMusic awarded the album 4½ stars.

== Track listing ==
All compositions by Sonny Stitt and Bennie Green except as indicated

1. "Flame and Frost" (Esmond Edwards) - 4:31
2. "Let's Play Chess" (Sonny Stitt) - 4:50
3. "Double Dip" - 4:41
4. "Our Day Will Come" (Bob Hilliard, Mort Garson) - 5:17
5. "My Main Man" - 5:54
6. "The Night Has a Thousand Eyes" (Buddy Bernier, Jerry Brainin) - 5:14
7. "Broilin'" - 4:27

== Personnel ==
- Sonny Stitt - alto saxophone, tenor saxophone
- Bennie Green - trombone
- Bobby Buster - organ
- Joe Diorio - guitar
- Dorel Anderson - drums
