= Move on Over =

Studio album by Sonny Stitt
- Released: 1963
- Recorded: June 7, 1963
- Studio: Ter-Mar Recording Studio, Chicago, Illinois
- Genre: Jazz
- Label: Argo; LP 730

Sonny Stitt chronology
My Mother's Eyes (1963)	Move on Over (1963)	Now! (1963)

Professional ratings
Review scores
Source	Rating
Allmusic	3.5/5 stars

Move on Over is an album by saxophonist Sonny Stitt recorded in 1963 and released on the Argo label.

== Reception ==
The Allmusic site awarded the album 3½ stars calling the album "a gritty, kinetic session fueled by the lively give and take of its principles... All four participants seem to operate on pure instinct, translating the energy of the live setting into the sterile confines of the recording studio, and the music is all the better for it".

== Track listing ==
All compositions by Sonny Stitt except as indicated

1. "The Lady Is a Tramp" (Lorenz Hart, Richard Rodgers) - 7:18
2. "Stormy Weather" (Harold Arlen, Ted Koehler) - 4:26
3. "Dexter's Deck" (Dexter Gordon) - 4:10
4. "My Mother's Eyes" (Abel Baer, L. Wolfe Gilbert) - 3:56
5. "Shut the Back Door" - 5:54
6. "A Natural Fox" - 5:24
7. "Love Letters" (Victor Young, Edward Heyman) - 3:52
8. "Move on Over" - 3:16

== Personnel ==
- Sonny Stitt - alto saxophone, tenor saxophone
- Nicky Hill - tenor saxophone
- Eddie Buster - organ
- Joe Diorio - guitar
- Gerald Donovan - drums
