= So Doggone Good =

Studio album by Sonny Stitt
- Released: 1973
- Recorded: September 13–14, 1972
- Studio: Fantasy Studios, Berkeley, California
- Genre: Jazz
- Length: 31:43
- Label: Prestige; PR-10074
- Producer: Ray Shanklin

Sonny Stitt chronology
Constellation (1972)	So Doggone Good (1973)	12! (1971)

Professional ratings
Review scores
Source	Rating
Allmusic	3/5 stars

So Doggone Good is an album by saxophonist Sonny Stitt recorded in 1972 and released on the Prestige label.

== Reception ==
In his review for Allmusic, Scott Yanow stated "the jam session-style music is reasonably enjoyable although recommended primarily for his greatest fans".

== Track listing ==
All compositions by Sonny Stitt except as indicated

1. "Back Door" - 6:29
2. "Your Love Is So Doggone Good" (Difosco Ervin, Rudy Love) - 5:44
3. "Orange Ashtray" - 3:41
4. "I Don't Know Yet" - 7:18
5. "The More I See You" (Mack Gordon, Harry Warren) - 4:38
6. "Speculation" - 3:53

== Personnel ==
- Sonny Stitt - alto saxophone, tenor saxophone
- Hampton Hawes - piano
- Reggie Johnson - bass
- Lenny McBrowne - drums
