= Deuces Wild (Sonny Stitt album) =

Studio album by Sonny Stitt
- Released: 1967
- Recorded: September 11, 1966; New York City
- Genre: Jazz
- Length: 33:58
- Label: Atlantic; 3008
- Producer: Joel Dorn

Sonny Stitt chronology
I Keep Comin' Back! (1966)	Deuces Wild (1967)	Parallel-a-Stitt (1967)

Deuces Wild is an album by saxophonist Sonny Stitt recorded in 1966 and released on the Atlantic label. The album featured Robin Kenyatta's recording debut. The 4 Stitt organ trio tracks can be found as bonus tracks to the My Mother's Eye's CD

== Reception ==
Professional ratings
Review scores
Source	Rating
Allmusic	3/5 stars

In his review for Allmusic, Jim Todd stated "The performances are concise, blues-based blowing numbers. What they lack in compositional refinement they make up for in energetic execution".

== Track listing ==
All compositions by Sonny Stitt except as indicated

1. "Deuces Wild" - 5:25
2. "My Foolish Heart" (Ned Washington, Victor Young) - 4:44
3. "Blues Ahead" - 4:18
4. "Sittin' in with Stitt" - 4:01
5. "In the Bag" (Robin Kenyatta) - 6:21
6. "Me 'n' You" (Kenyatta) - 3:19
7. "Pipin' the Blues" (Rufus Harley, Stitt) - 5:50

== Personnel ==
- Sonny Stitt - alto saxophone, tenor saxophone
- Wilmer Mosby (AKA Don Patterson) - organ
- Billy James - drums
- Robin Kenyatta - alto saxophone (track 5), soprano saxophone (track 6)
- Rufus Harley - tenor saxophone, and bagpipes (track 7)
