= Salt and Pepper (album) =

Studio album by Sonny Stitt and Paul Gonsalves
- Released: July 1964
- Recorded: September 5, 1963
- Studio: Van Gelder Studio, Englewood Cliffs
- Genre: Jazz
- Length: 35:30
- Label: Impulse! A-52
- Producer: Bob Thiele

Sonny Stitt chronology
| Now! (1963) | Salt and Pepper (1964) | Soul Shack (1963) |

Salt and Pepper is an album by Sonny Stitt and Paul Gonsalves released in 1964 on Impulse!. It was Stitt's second and last effort for the label, after Now!, recorded and released the same year.

== Track listing ==
1. "Salt and Pepper" (Sonny Stitt, Paul Gonsalves) - 7:52
2. "S'posin' " (Paul Denniker, Andy Razaf) - 6:21
3. "Theme from Lord of the Flies" (Raymond Leppard) - 2:28
4. "Perdido" (Juan Tizol, Ervin Drake, Hans Lengsfelder) - 12:40
5. "Stardust" (Hoagy Carmichael, Mitchell Parish) - 6:09

== Personnel ==
- Paul Gonsalves - tenor saxophone
- Sonny Stitt - tenor saxophone, alto saxophone, track 5
- Hank Jones - piano
- Milt Hinton - bass
- Osie Johnson - drums
