= Goin' Down Slow (album) =

Studio album by Sonny Stitt
- Released: 1972
- Recorded: February 15, 1972
- Studio: Van Gelder Studio, Englewood Cliffs, New Jersey
- Genre: Jazz
- Length: 31:43
- Label: Prestige; PR-10074
- Producer: Ozzie Cadena

Sonny Stitt chronology
Tune-Up! (1972)	Goin' Down Slow (1972)	Constellation (1972)

Professional ratings
Review scores
Source	Rating
Allmusic	4.5/5 stars

Goin' Down Slow is an album by saxophonist Sonny Stitt recorded in 1972 and released on the Prestige label.

== Reception ==
In his review for Allmusic, Scott Yanow stated "Sonny Stitt was in one of his prime periods during the early '70s and this LP finds him in particularly creative form".

== Track listing ==
1. "Miss Ann, Lisa, Sue and Sadie" (Sonny Stitt) - 14:10
2. "Where Is Love?" (Lionel Bart) - 4:23
3. "Livin' Without You" (Randy Newman) - 7:30
4. "Goin' Down Slow" (James Oden) - 3:54
5. "Moving Beauty" (Traditional) - 3:48

== Personnel ==
- Sonny Stitt - alto saxophone, tenor saxophone
- Thad Jones - trumpet
- Hank Jones - piano
- Billy Butler, Wally Richardson - guitar
- George Duvivier - bass
- Idris Muhammad - drums
- Buddy Caldwell - congas, bells
- Unidentified strings arranged and conducted by Billy Ver Planck
