= Feelin's (Sonny Stitt album) =

Studio album by Sonny Stitt
- Released: 1962
- Recorded: February–April 1962; New York City
- Genre: Jazz
- Label: Roost; RLP 2247
- Producer: Teddy Reig

Sonny Stitt chronology
Soul Summit (1962)	Feelin's (1962)	Low Flame (1962)

Professional ratings
Review scores
Source	Rating
Down Beat	3/5 stars
Allmusic	3/5 stars

Feelin's is an album by saxophonist Sonny Stitt recorded in 1962 and originally released on the Roost label.

== Reception ==
The Allmusic site awarded the album 3 stars.

== Track listing ==
All compositions by Sonny Stitt except as indicated

1. "'O sole mio" (Giovanni Capurro, Eduardo di Capua) - 3:42
2. "Feelin's" - 3:53
3. "Nightmare" - 2:15
4. "S'posin'" (Paul Denniker, Andy Razaf) - 6:17
5. "Look Up" - 3:09
6. "Goodnight, Ladies" (Edwin Pearce Christy) - 3:49
7. "If I Should Lose You" (Ralph Rainger, Leo Robin) - 5:17
8. "Hollerin' the Blues" - 4:47
9. "Stretch Pants" - 5:07

== Personnel ==
- Sonny Stitt - alto saxophone, tenor saxophone
- Don Patterson - organ
- Paul Weeden - guitar
- Billy James - drums
