= Jerry Byrd =

American singer-songwriter (1920–2005)

Background information
- Born: Gerald Lester Byrd; March 9, 1920; Lima, Ohio, U.S.
- Origin: Nashville
- Died: April 11, 2005 (aged 85) Honolulu, Hawaii, U.S
- Genres: Country, honky tonk, Hawaiian music
- Occupation: Musician
- Instrument: Lap steel guitar
- Years active: 1935–2005

Gerald Lester Byrd (March 9, 1920 – April 11, 2005) was an American musician who played the lap steel guitar in country and Hawaiian music, as well as a singer-songwriter and the head of a music publishing firm. He appeared on numerous radio programs.

== Career ==
Byrd was born in Lima, Ohio, United States, one of five siblings, his interest in the instrument began after a "tent show" when he was 12 and by 15 he was playing in bars. Although his initial interest was Hawaiian music much of his work was country. In 1944/1945 he joined the Grand Ole Opry. He was important to the early career of Dolly Parton being one of the first to sign her. He also was an educator of the steel guitar giving lessons to Jimmie Vaughan and Jerry Garcia among others. The list of artists that Byrd played or recorded with included Hank Williams, Ernest Tubb, Patsy Cline and Red Foley and countless others. With Hank Williams he played songs such as "I'm So Lonesome I Could Cry", "Lovesick Blues" and "A Mansion on the Hill." In the early 1970s, he moved to Hawaii and worked on reviving Hawaiian steel guitar music, taking a great delight in giving lap steel lessons to the young musicians who showed interest in ensuring that the lap steel remained an important instrument in Hawaiian music. While living in Hawaii, Byrd had a regular weekly gig with his trio at the Royal Hawaiian Hotel that lasted until his death. Though Byrd often joked about pedal steel guitar players, he gave praise to Buddy Emmons, saying he had taken the steel guitar to new places with his playing.

== Personal life and death ==
He published his autobiography It Was a Trip: On The Wings of Music. On April 11, 2005, Byrd died of Parkinson's disease at 85 in Honolulu, Hawaii, where he had resided for 30 years; he was survived by wife Kaleo Wood and two daughters.

== Awards and recognition ==
He was inducted into the Steel Guitar Hall of Fame in 1978 as its first member; his Rickenbacker lap steel is housed at the Country Music Hall of Fame

== Discography ==
=== Studio albums ===
- Nani Hawaii (1953) Mercury
- Byrd's Exhibition (1954) Mercury
- Guitar Magic (1954) Mercury
- Steel Guitar Favorites (1958) Mercury
- Hi-Fi Guitar (1958) Decca
- On the Shores of Waikiki (1960) Decca
- Byrd of Paradise (1961) Monument
- Memories of Maria (1962) Monument
- Blue Hawaiian Steel Guitar (1963) Mercury
- Man of Steel (1964) Mercury
- Satin Strings of Steel (1965) Monument
- Potpourri (1966) Monument
- Burning Sands, Pearly Shells, & Steel Guitars (1967) Monument
- Country Steel Guitar Hits (1966) Wing
- Steel Guitar Hawaiian Style (1976) Lehua
- Polynesian Suite (1995) Sony Music Distribution
- Christmas in Hawaii (2003) Lehua

=== Compilations ===
- Jerry Byrd: By Request (2002) Mountain Apple
- Steel Guitar (2002) Mountain Apple
- The Master of Touch and Tone (2005) Mountain Apple
- Master of the Steel Guitar, Vol. 1 (2005) Hana Ola—Rsi

=== As sideman ===
Jerry Byrd participated as a sideman on numerous recording sessions, primarily with country and Hawaiian music artists. His contributions include recordings with Hank Williams, such as Lovesick Blues and with Ernest Tubb on Walking the Floor Over You. He also worked with Patsy Cline on some of her early sessions and collaborated with Marty Robbins on the album Song of the Islands. His discography as a sideman spans multiple decades, with additional recordings alongside artists like Red Foley and George Morgan.

Other players on Hank's recordings include Dale "Smokey" Lohman (Early recordings), also Don Davis played one or two sessions with Hank. From 1950 on it was Don Helms.

With Jack McDuff

- Gin and Orange (Cadet, 1969)

With Don Patterson

- Satisfaction! (Prestige, 1965)
