= Night Letter =

Studio album by Sonny Stitt
- Released: 1970
- Recorded: October 27, 1969
- Studio: Van Gelder Studio, Englewood Cliffs, New Jersey
- Genre: Jazz
- Length: 34:27
- Label: Prestige; PR-7759
- Producer: Bob Porter

Sonny Stitt chronology
Brothers-4 (1969)	Night Letter (1970)	Turn It On! (1969)

Professional ratings
Review scores
Source	Rating
Allmusic	3/5 stars
The Rolling Stone Jazz Record Guide	3/5 stars
The Penguin Guide to Jazz Recordings	3/4 stars

Night Letter is an album by saxophonist Sonny Stitt recorded in 1969 and released on the Prestige label. The album features Stitt using the varitone, an electronic amplification device which altered the saxophone's sound.

== Reception ==
Allmusic reviewed the album stating "He plays with the usual surging intensity, but the album doesn't have as much excitement as similar dates done before and after it".

== Track listing ==
All compositions by Sonny Stitt except where noted

1. "Night Letter" - 5:15
2. "When It's Sleepy Time Down South" (Clarence Muse, Leon René, Otis René) - 4:07
3. "Stringin' the Jug" (Gene Ammons, Stitt) - 5:20
4. "Pretend" (Lew Douglas, Cliff Parman, Frank LeVere) - 3:45
5. "Blue String" - 6:20
6. "You'll Never Know" (Harry Warren, Mack Gordon) - 4:00
7. "Blues Walk" - 5:55

== Personnel ==
- Sonny Stitt - tenor saxophone, varitone
- Gene Ludwig - organ
- Pat Martino - guitar
- Randy Gelispie - drums
