= Sax Expressions =

Studio album by Sonny Stitt
- Released: 1965
- Recorded: April 14, 1965
- Studio: Bell Sound, New York City
- Genre: Jazz
- Label: Roost; RLP 2262
- Producer: Teddy Reig

Sonny Stitt chronology
| Broadway Soul (1965) | Sax Expressions (1965) | The Matadors Meet the Bull (1965) |

Sax Expressions is an album by saxophonist Sonny Stitt recorded in 1965 and originally released on the Roost label.

== Track listing ==
All compositions by Sarah Boatner except as indicated

1. "Round Robin" - 6:28
2. "How Do You Do" - 6:32
3. "Mother Tucker" - 4:31
4. "For All We Know" (Sam M. Lewis, J. Fred Coots) - 2:21
5. "Don't Worry" - 4:33
6. "Cut It Off" - 5:00
7. "I Know That You Know" (Vincent Youmans, Anne Caldwell, Otto Harbach) - 3:31

== Personnel ==
- Sonny Stitt - alto saxophone
- Harold Mabern - piano
- Ben Tucker - bass
- Roy Haynes - drums
