= 12! =

Studio album by Sonny Stitt
- Released: 1973
- Recorded: December 12, 1972
- Genre: Jazz
- Length: 40:37
- Label: Muse; MR 5006
- Producer: Don Schlitten

Sonny Stitt chronology
So Doggone Good (1972)	12! (1973)	Mr. Bojangles (1973)

Professional ratings
Review scores
Source	Rating
AllMusic	4.5/5 stars

12! is an album by saxophonist Sonny Stitt recorded in 1972 and released on the Muse label.

== Reception ==
AllMusic reviewed the album stating "this album is also one of the saxophonist's most rewarding recordings".

== Track listing ==
All compositions by Sonny Stitt except as indicated

1. "12!" – 5:03
2. "I Got It Bad (and That Ain't Good)" (Duke Ellington, Paul Francis Webster) – 4:17
3. "I Never Knew" (Gus Kahn, Ted Fio Rito) – 6:42
4. "Our Delight" (Tadd Dameron) – 5:31
5. "The Night Has a Thousand Eyes" (Buddy Bernier, Jerry Brainin) – 4:57
6. "Blues at the Tempo" – 6:55
7. "Every Tub" (Count Basie, Eddie Durham) – 7:12

== Personnel ==
- Sonny Stitt – alto saxophone, tenor saxophone
- Barry Harris – piano
- Sam Jones – bass
- Louis Hayes – drums
