= Tune-Up! =

Studio album by Sonny Stitt
- Released: 1972
- Recorded: February 8, 1972
- Genre: Jazz
- Length: 37:57
- Label: Cobblestone; CST 9013
- Producer: Don Schlitten

Sonny Stitt chronology
Just the Way It Was (1971)	Tune-Up! (1972)	Goin' Down Slow (1972)

Professional ratings
Review scores
Source	Rating
AllMusic	5/5 stars
DownBeat	5/5 stars

Tune-Up! is an album by saxophonist Sonny Stitt recorded in 1972 and released on the Cobblestone label.

== Reception ==
AllMusic reviewed the album, stating: "Sonny Stitt recorded over 100 albums as a leader and several dozen in a quartet setting in his productive career, but this one ranks at the top. The bebop tenor and alto stylist is very inspired by the top-notch rhythm section".

DownBeat rated the album five of five stars, calling it "an instant classic."

== Track listing ==
1. "Tune-Up" (Miles Davis) – 4:53
2. "I Can't Get Started" (Vernon Duke, Ira Gershwin) – 5:32
3. "Idaho" (Jesse Stone) – 4:29
4. "Just Friends" (John Klenner, Sam M. Lewis) – 4:28
5. "Blues for Prez and Bird" (Sonny Stitt) – 4:30
6. "Groovin' High" (Dizzy Gillespie) – 4:24
7. "I Got Rhythm" (George Gershwin, Ira Gershwin) – 9:41

== Personnel ==
- Sonny Stitt – alto saxophone, tenor saxophone
- Barry Harris – piano
- Sam Jones – bass
- Alan Dawson – drums
