= Good Bait =

Composition by Tadd Dameron and Count Basie

"Good Bait" is a jazz composition written by American jazz piano player and composer Tadd Dameron and by band leader Count Basie. It was introduced in 1944 and was popular in the 1940s and 1950s.

== Form ==
Good Bait uses the changes to "I've Got Rhythm" (Rhythm changes) transposed up by a fourth as its bridge.

The chord changes to Good Bait are similar to those of La Mer ("The Sea"), which was released at about the same time, and the title "Good Bait" may be an allusion to the sea.

== Other recorded versions ==
The song has been performed by a number of other artists, including:

- Charlie Parker with Dizzy Gillespie and His Orchestra – Live "Pershing Ballroom", Chicago (1948)
- Fats Navarro with Tadd Dameron – Broadcast "Royal Roost", New York, August 29 and October 2, 1948
- John Coltrane – Soultrane (1958)
- Nina Simone – Little Girl Blue (1958)
- Dizzy Gillespie – Something Old, Something New (1963)
- Don Patterson – Brothers–4 (1969)
- Dexter Gordon – Lullaby for a Monster (1976)
- Duke Jordan – I Remember Bebop : Duke Jordan Plays Tadd Dameron (1977)
- Roland Hanna – Bird Watching (1978)
- Max Roach – In the Light (1982)
- Steve Grossman – In New York (1991)
- Joe Pass – Live at Yoshi's (1992)

== See also ==
- List of jazz contrafacts
