= The Black Cat! =

Studio album by Gene Ammons
- Released: 1971
- Recorded: November 11, 1970
- Studio: Van Gelder Studio, Englewood Cliffs, New Jersey
- Genre: Jazz
- Length: 34:34
- Label: Prestige; PR 10006
- Producer: Bob Porter

Gene Ammons chronology
| The Chase! (1970) | The Black Cat! (1971) | You Talk That Talk! (1971) |

Professional ratings
Review scores
| Source | Rating |
|---|---|
| Allmusic | 4/5 stars |
| The Rolling Stone Jazz Record Guide | 3/5 stars |

The Black Cat! is an album by saxophonist Gene Ammons, recorded in 1970 and released on the Prestige label.

== Reception ==
Allmusic awarded the album 4 stars with its review by Stewart Mason stating, "One of Gene Ammons' best late-period albums, 1970's Black Cat is a bluesy, low-key album and a comparative anomaly: a primarily acoustic soul-jazz album! Ammons was experimenting heavily with the amplified, feedback-laced electric saxophone during this period, but for Black Cat he sticks to his familiar unamplified tenor, playing raunchy gutbucket lines".

== Track listing ==
All compositions by Gene Ammons except where noted.

1. "The Black Cat" (George Freeman) – 5:36
2. "Long Long Time" (Gary White) – 4:31
3. "Piece to Keep Away Evil Spirits" – 7:49
4. "Jug Eyes" – 8:10
5. "Something" (George Harrison) – 3:20
6. "Hi Ruth!" – 5:08

== Personnel ==
- Gene Ammons – tenor saxophone
- Harold Mabern – piano, electric piano
- George Freeman – guitar
- Ron Carter – bass
- Idris Muhammad – drums
- Unidentified violins arranged by Bill Fischer (tracks 2 & 5)
