= Stitt Plays Bird =

Studio album by Sonny Stitt
- Released: Early July 1964
- Recorded: January 29, 1963
- Studio: Atlantic Studios, New York City
- Genre: Jazz
- Length: 36:50 original LP; 44:57 CD reissue
- Label: Atlantic; SD 1418
- Producer: Nesuhi Ertegun

Sonny Stitt chronology
Rearin' Back (1962)	Stitt Plays Bird (1964)	My Mother's Eyes (1963)

Stitt Plays Bird is an album by American jazz saxophonist Sonny Stitt, recorded in 1963 and issued on Atlantic Records in 1964. As the title suggests, it was recorded as a homage to the legendary saxophonist Charlie Parker, who was nicknamed "Bird."

Professional ratings
Review scores
Source	Rating
Allmusic	4.5/5 stars
The Penguin Guide to Jazz Recordings	3/4 stars

== Track listing ==
All pieces by Charlie Parker, unless otherwise noted.

1. "Ornithology" (Harris, Parker) – 3:41
2. "Scrapple from the Apple" – 3:49
3. "My Little Suede Shoes" – 3:06
4. "Parker's Mood" – 4:21
5. "Au Privave" – 2:40
6. "Ko-Ko" – 4:54
7. "Confirmation" – 4:36
8. "Hootie Blues" (McShann) – 6:24
9. "Constellation" – 3:19

Bonus tracks on CD reissue:

10. "Now's the Time" – 3:18
11. "Yardbird Suite" – 4:49

== Personnel ==
- Sonny Stitt – alto saxophone
- John Lewis – piano
- Jim Hall – guitar
- Richard Davis – bass
- Connie Kay – drums
