= Constellation (Sonny Stitt album) =

Studio album by Sonny Stitt
- Released: 1972
- Recorded: June 27, 1972
- Studio: RCA Studio, New York City
- Genre: Jazz
- Length: 39:39
- Label: Cobblestone; CST 9021
- Producer: Don Schlitten

Sonny Stitt chronology
Goin' Down Slow (1972)	Constellation (1972)	So Doggone Good (1972)

Constellation is an album by saxophonist Sonny Stitt recorded in 1972 and released on the Cobblestone label.

== Reception ==
Professional ratings
Review scores
Source	Rating
AllMusic	5/5 stars

Scott Yanow of AllMusic called the album "one of Sonny Stitt's greatest recordings. The bop master is stunning on most of the eight selections... switching between alto and tenor and sounding quite creative... this set has more than its share of great moments".

== Track listing ==
1. "Constellation" (Charlie Parker) – 5:00
2. "I Don't Stand a Ghost of a Chance with You" (Bing Crosby, Ned Washington, Victor Young) – 4:46
3. "Webb City" (Bud Powell) – 3:30
4. "By Accident" (Sonny Stitt) – 6:42
5. "Ray's Idea" (Ray Brown, Gil Fuller) – 3:53
6. "Casbah" (Tadd Dameron) – 5:02
7. "It's Magic" (Sammy Cahn, Jule Styne) – 5:11
8. "Topsy" (Edgar Battle, Eddie Durham) – 5:35

== Personnel ==
- Sonny Stitt – alto saxophone, tenor saxophone
- Barry Harris – piano
- Sam Jones – bass
- Roy Brooks – drums
