= The Return of Don Patterson =

Studio album by Don Patterson
- Released: 1974
- Recorded: October 30, 1972; RCA Studios, New York City
- Genre: Jazz
- Length: 43:10
- Label: Muse; MR 5005
- Producer: Don Schlitten

Don Patterson chronology
| Tune Up! (1969) | The Return of Don Patterson (1974) | These Are Soulful Days (1973) |

Professional ratings
Review scores
| Source | Rating |
|---|---|
| Allmusic | 4.5/5 stars |

The Return of Don Patterson (also released as The Genius of the B-3) is an album by organist Don Patterson recorded in 1972 and released on the Muse label.

== Reception ==
Allmusic awarded the album 4½ stars with a review stating, "Any Don Patterson album is worthwhile".

== Track listing ==
All compositions by Don Patterson except as indicated

1. "Jesse Jackson" - 7:20
2. "Theme from the Odd Couple" (Neal Hefti) - 8:35
3. "Lori" (Jimmy Garrison) - 7:08
4. "(Where Do I Begin) Love Story" (Francis Lai, Carl Sigman) - 9:56
5. "The Lamp Is Low" (Peter DeRose, Mitchell Parish, Maurice Ravel, Bert Shefter) - 10:11

== Personnel ==
- Don Patterson - organ
- Eddie Daniels - tenor saxophone, alto saxophone, soprano saxophone
- Ted Dunbar - guitar
- Freddie Waits - drums
