= My Buddy: Sonny Stitt Plays for Gene Ammons =

Studio album by Sonny Stitt
- Released: 1976
- Recorded: July 2, 1975
- Studio: Bell Sound (New York City)
- Genre: Jazz
- Label: Muse; MR 5091
- Producer: Bob Porter

Sonny Stitt chronology
The Bop Session (1975)	My Buddy: Sonny Stitt Plays for Gene Ammons (1976)	Dumpy Mama (1975)

My Buddy: Sonny Stitt Plays for Gene Ammons is an album by saxophonist Sonny Stitt featuring selections associated with his fellow musician Gene Ammons recorded in 1975 and released on the Muse label in 1976.

== Reception ==
Professional ratings
Review scores
Source	Rating
Allmusic	4/5 stars

Allmusic reviewed the album calling it a "fine tribute album" and stating "this is a high-quality bop set".

== Track listing ==
1. "You Can Depend On Me" (Charles Carpenter, Louis Dunlap, Earl Hines) - 7:13
2. "Red Top" (Gene Ammons) - 4:01
3. "Exactly Like You" (Dorothy Fields, Jimmy McHugh) - 4:55
4. "My Buddy" (Walter Donaldson, Gus Kahn) - 6:12
5. "Confirmation" (Charlie Parker) - 4:25
6. "Blues for Brad and Kolax" (Sonny Stitt) - 7:05

== Personnel ==
- Sonny Stitt - alto saxophone, tenor saxophone
- Barry Harris - piano
- Sam Jones - bass
- Leroy Williams - drums
