= Sonny Stitt & the Top Brass =

Studio album by Sonny Stitt
- Released: 1963
- Recorded: July 16–17, 1962; New York City
- Genre: Jazz
- Length: 35:23
- Label: Atlantic; 1395
- Producer: Ahmet Ertegun

Sonny Stitt chronology
Stitt in Orbit (1962)	Sonny Stitt & the Top Brass (1963)	Rearin' Back (1962)

Sonny Stitt & the Top Brass is an album by saxophonist Sonny Stitt recorded in 1962 and released on the Atlantic label.

== Reception ==
Professional ratings
Review scores
Source	Rating
Down Beat	4/5 stars
Allmusic	4.5/5 stars
The Penguin Guide to Jazz Recordings	3/4 stars

In his review for Allmusic, Scott Yanow stated "The charts give this Stitt album more variety than usual, and the superior material challenges the saxophonist to play at his best".

== Track listing ==
All compositions by Sonny Stitt except as indicated

1. "Souls Valley" (Richard Carpenter) – 4:31
2. "Coquette" (Johnny Green, Gus Kahn, Carmen Lombardo) – 3:18
3. "On a Misty Night" (Tadd Dameron) – 4:04
4. "Stittsie" – 5:55
5. "Poinciana" (Buddy Bernier, Nat Simon) – 3:06
6. "Boom-Boom" (Jimmy Mundy) – 2:38
7. "See See Rider" (traditional) – 4:52
8. "The Four Ninety" (Dameron) – 4:01
9. "Hey Pam" – 2:58
- Recorded in New York City on July 16 (tracks 1, 3, 4, 6 & 8) and July 17 (tracks 2, 5, 7 & 9), 1962

== Personnel ==
- Sonny Stitt – alto saxophone
- Reunald Jones, Blue Mitchell, Dick Vance – trumpet
- Jimmy Cleveland, Matthew Gee – trombone
- Willie Ruff – French horn
- Duke Jordan – piano (tracks 2, 5, 7 & 9)
- Perri Lee – organ (tracks 1, 3, 4, 6 & 8)
- Joe Benjamin – bass
- Frank Brown (tracks 2, 5, 7 & 9), Philly Joe Jones (tracks 1, 3, 4, 6 & 8) – drums
- Tadd Dameron, Jimmy Mundy – arranger
