= The Bop Session =

1975 studio jazz album

Studio album by Dizzy Gillespie, Sonny Stitt, John Lewis, Hank Jones, Percy Heath and Max Roach
- Released: 1975
- Recorded: May 19–20, 1975
- Studio: A & R Studios, New York City
- Genre: Jazz
- Length: 50:34
- Label: Sonet; SNTF 692
- Producer: Sam Charters

Dizzy Gillespie chronology
Oscar Peterson and The Trumpet Kings - Jousts (1974)	The Bop Session (1975)	Jazz Maturity...Where It's Coming From (1975)

Sonny Stitt chronology
In Walked Sonny (1975)	The Bop Session (1975)	My Buddy: Sonny Stitt Plays for Gene Ammons (1975)

CD Reissue Cover

The Bop Session is an album by jazz legends Dizzy Gillespie, Sonny Stitt, John Lewis, Hank Jones, Percy Heath and Max Roach recorded in 1975 and released on the Swedish Sonet label.

== Reception ==
The Allmusic review stated "Bop fans should enjoy this date despite the lack of surprises".

Professional ratings
Review scores
Source	Rating
Allmusic	3/5 stars

== Track listing ==
1. "Blues 'N Boogie" (Dizzy Gillespie, Felix Paparelli) - 9:30
2. "Confirmation" (Charlie Parker) - 8:31
3. "Groovin' High" (Gillespie) - 7:17
4. "Lover Man (Oh, Where Can You Be?)" (Jimmy Davis, Ram Ramirez, James Sherman) - 6:58
5. "All the Things You Are" (Oscar Hammerstein II, Jerome Kern) - 9:54
6. "Lady Bird" (Tadd Dameron) - 8:24

== Personnel ==
- Dizzy Gillespie - trumpet
- Sonny Stitt - alto saxophone, tenor saxophone
- John Lewis (tracks 1 & 5), Hank Jones (tracks 2–4 & 6) - piano
- Percy Heath - bass
- Max Roach - drums
