= Pow! (album) =

Studio album by Sonny Stitt
- Released: 1967
- Recorded: September 10, 1965; New York City
- Genre: Jazz
- Label: Prestige; PR-7459
- Producer: Richard Carpenter

Sonny Stitt chronology
The Matadors Meet the Bull (1965)	Pow! (1967)	Night Crawler (1965)

Pow! is an album by saxophonist Sonny Stitt featuring trombonist Benny Green recorded in 1965 and released on the Prestige label in 1967.

== Reception ==
Professional ratings
Review scores
Source	Rating
Allmusic	4/5 stars

Allmusic awarded the album 4 stars stating "Altoist Sonny Stitt and trombonist Benny Green make for a potent team on this spirited quintet set... the two distinctive horns (along with pianist Kirk Lightsey, bassist Herman Wright and drummer Roy Brooks) have little difficulty essaying these bop pieces, blues and ballads, and their personable styles match well together".

== Track listing ==
All compositions by Carpenter and Bruce except as indicated

1. "I Want to Be Happy" (Vincent Youmans, Irving Caesar) - 8:27
2. "Love on the Rocks" - 6:49
3. "Blue Lights" - 7:41
4. "Scramble" - 6:54
5. "Up and Over" - 4:11
6. "Pride and Passion" - 4:47
7. "'Nuff Guff" - 7:41

== Personnel ==
- Sonny Stitt - alto saxophone, tenor saxophone
- Benny Green - trombone
- Kirk Lightsey - piano
- Herman Wright - bass
- Roy Brooks - drums
