= Broadway Soul =

Studio album by Sonny Stitt
- Released: 1965
- Recorded: February 13, 1965; New York City
- Genre: Jazz
- Length: 31:39
- Label: Colpix; CP-499

Sonny Stitt chronology
Inter-Action (1965)	Broadway Soul (1965)	Sax Expressions (1965)

Broadway Soul is an album by saxophonist Sonny Stitt recorded in 1965 and released on the Colpix label.

== Reception ==
Professional ratings
Review scores
Source	Rating
Allmusic	2/5 stars

Scott Yanow of Allmusic states, "this set is far from essential. However Stitt's solos generally uplift the material and the saxophonist's fans will want the collector's item".

== Track listing ==
1. "Hello, Dolly!" (Jerry Herman) - 2:59
2. "Better All the Time" (Sammy Fain, Marilyn Bergman, Alan Bergman) - 3:35
3. "You'd Better Love Me" (Hugh Martin, Timothy Gray) - 3:23
4. "Night Song" (Lee Adams, Charles Strouse) - 5:09
5. "A Room Without Windows" (Ervin Drake) - 3:27
6. "Gimme Some" (Adams, Strouse) - 5:11
7. "Loads of Love" (Richard Rodgers) - 2:15
8. "If I Gave You" (Martin, Gray) - 5:05

== Personnel ==
- Sonny Stitt - alto saxophone, tenor saxophone
- Thad Jones, Ernie Royal - trumpet
- Jimmy Cleveland - trombone
- Budd Johnson, Jerome Richardson, Zoot Sims - tenor saxophone
- Walter Bishop, Jr., Roger Kellaway - piano
- Milt Hinton - bass
- Osie Johnson - drums
