= Why Not... =

Studio album by Don Patterson
- Released: 1978
- Recorded: January 26, 1978
- Studio: Van Gelder Studio, Englewood Cliffs, New Jersey
- Genre: Jazz
- Length: 41:28
- Label: Muse; MR 5148
- Producer: Houston Person

Don Patterson chronology
Movin' Up! (1977)	Why Not... (1978)

Professional ratings
Review scores
Source	Rating
Allmusic	3/5 stars

Why Not... is the final album by organist Don Patterson recorded in 1978 and released on the Muse label.

== Reception ==
Allmusic awarded the album 3 stars.

== Track listing ==
All compositions by Don Patterson

1. "Why Not" - 11:35
2. "Aries" - 8:08
3. "Dem New York Dues" - 8:05
4. "Three Miles Out" - 5:30
5. "Freddie Tooks, Jr." - 6:30

== Personnel ==
- Don Patterson - organ
- Virgil Jones - trumpet
- Bootsie Barnes - tenor saxophone
- Eddie McFadden - guitar
- Idris Muhammad - drums
