= New York Jazz =

Studio album by Sonny Stitt
- Released: 1956
- Recorded: September 14, 1956
- Studios: Fine Sound, New York City
- Genre: Jazz
- Length: 46:00
- Labels: Verve; MGV 8219
- Producer: Norman Granz

Sonny Stitt chronology
Sonny Stitt Plays (1955)	New York Jazz (1956)	For Musicians Only (1956)

Professional ratings
Review scores
Source	Rating
Disc	5/5 stars
The Penguin Guide to Jazz Recordings	3.5/4 stars

New York Jazz is an album by saxophonist Sonny Stitt recorded in 1956 and originally released on the Verve label.

== Track listing ==
All compositions by Sonny Stitt except as indicated

1. "Norman's Blues" – 2:43
2. "I Know That You Know" (Anne Caldwell, Vincent Youmans) – 4:29
3. "If I Had You" (Jimmy Campbell, Reg Connelly, Ted Shapiro) – 6:19
4. "Alone Together" (Howard Dietz, Arthur Schwartz) – 4:54
5. "Twelfth Street Rag" (Euday L. Bowman) – 3:34
6. "Down Home Blues (Funky Blues)" – 5:13
7. "Sonny's Tune" – 5:32
8. "Stars Fell on Alabama" (Mitchell Parish, Frank Perkins) – 4:11
9. "Body and Soul" (Edward Heyman, Robert Sour, Frank Eyton, Johnny Green) – 4:31
10. "Between the Devil and the Deep Blue Sea" (Harold Arlen, Ted Koehler) – 4:37

== Personnel ==
=== Performance ===
- Sonny Stitt - alto saxophone, tenor saxophone
- Jimmy Jones – piano
- Ray Brown – bass
- Jo Jones - drums
