= My Mother's Eyes (Sonny Stitt album) =

Studio album by Sonny Stitt
- Released: 1963
- Recorded: May 1963; Los Angeles, California
- Genre: Jazz
- Label: Pacific Jazz; PJ 71

Sonny Stitt chronology
Stitt Plays Bird (1963)	My Mother's Eyes (1963)	Move on Over (1963)

Professional ratings
Review scores
Source	Rating
Down Beat	3/5 stars
Allmusic	3/5 stars
The Penguin Guide to Jazz Recordings	3/4 stars

My Mother's Eyes is an album by saxophonist Sonny Stitt recorded in 1963 in Los Angeles and released on the Pacific Jazz label.

== Reception ==
The Allmusic site awarded the album 3 stars stating "This obscure LP finds Sonny Stitt sticking to tenor and playing a typical set filled with blues, standards and riff-filled originals".

== Track listing ==
All compositions by Sonny Stitt except where noted.

1. "Summer Special"
2. "My Mother's Eyes" (Abel Baer, L. Wolfe Gilbert)
3. "Still in Time"
4. "Blue Skies" (Irving Berlin)
5. "S.O.P. Blues"
6. "Don't Go to Strangers" (Redd Evans, Arthur Kent, David Mann)
7. "Red Top" (Lionel Hampton)

== Personnel ==
- Sonny Stitt – tenor saxophone
- Charles Kynard – organ
- Ray Crawford – guitar
- Doug Sides – drums
