= Now! (Sonny Stitt album) =

Studio album by Sonny Stitt
- Released: Early July 1963
- Recorded: June 10, 1963
- Studio: Van Gelder Studio, Englewood Cliffs, NJ
- Genre: Jazz
- Length: 37:08
- Label: Impulse! A-43
- Producer: Bob Thiele

Sonny Stitt chronology
Move on Over (1963)	Now! (1963)	Salt and Pepper (1963)

Professional ratings
Review scores
Source	Rating
Down Beat	3/5 stars

Now! is a 1963 album by jazz saxophonist Sonny Stitt, his first of two albums released by Impulse! Records.

== Track listing ==
All compositions by Sonny Stitt, unless otherwise noted

1. "Surfin'" - 4:12
2. "Lester Leaps In" (Lester Young) - 6:23
3. "Estralita" - originally spelled "Estrellita" (Manuel Ponce) - 3:17
4. "Please Don't Talk About Me When I'm Gone" (Sam Stept, Sidney Clare) - 4:34
5. "Touchy" - 5:13
6. "Never ---SH!" - 5:07
7. "My Mother's Eyes" (Abel Baer, L. Wolfe Gilbert) - 4:08
8. "I'm Getting Sentimental Over You" (George Bassman, Ned Washington) - 4:14

== Personnel ==
- Sonny Stitt - alto saxophone & tenor saxophone
- Hank Jones - piano
- Al Lucas - bass
- Osie Johnson - drums
