= Dumpy Mama =

Studio album by Sonny Stitt
- Released: 1975
- Recorded: 1975
- Genre: Jazz
- Length: 33:20
- Label: RCA/Flying Dutchman; BDL 1-1197
- Producer: Bob Thiele

Sonny Stitt chronology
My Buddy: Sonny Stitt Plays for Gene Ammons (1975)	Dumpy Mama (1975)	Blues for Duke (1975)

Dumpy Mama is an album by American jazz saxophonist Sonny Stitt, featuring performances recorded in 1975 for the Flying Dutchman label.

== Reception ==
Professional ratings
Review scores
Source	Rating
AllMusic	3/5 stars

In his review for AllMusic, Scott Yanow stated, "The playing is up to par if not overly memorable".

== Track listing ==
1. "Jason" (Sonny Stitt) - 7:30
2. "Danny Boy for Ben" (Traditional) - 4:15
3. "Just Friends" (John Klenner, Sam M. Lewis) - 4:16
4. "Dumpy Mama" (Oliver Nelson) - 10:05
5. "It Might As Well Be Spring" (Richard Rodgers, Oscar Hammerstein II) - 7:00

== Personnel ==
- Sonny Stitt - tenor saxophone, alto saxophone, arranger
- Frank Strozier - alto saxophone (tracks 1, 3 & 4)
- Pee Wee Ellis - tenor saxophone (tracks 1, 3 & 4)
- Mike Wofford - piano
- Brian Torff - bass (tracks 1 & 3–5)
- Shelly Manne - drums (tracks 1 & 3–5)
- Ray Armando - Latin percussion (track 1, 3 & 4)
