= Black Vibrations =

Studio album by Sonny Stitt
- Released: 1972
- Recorded: July 9, 1971
- Studio: Van Gelder Studio, Englewood Cliffs, New Jersey
- Genre: Jazz
- Length: 36:28
- Label: Prestige; PR-10032
- Producer: Bob Porter

Sonny Stitt chronology
You Talk That Talk! (1971)	Black Vibrations (1972)	Just the Way It Was (1971)

Professional ratings
Review scores
Source	Rating
Allmusic	3/5 stars

Black Vibrations is an album by saxophonist Sonny Stitt recorded in 1971 and released on the Prestige label.

== Reception ==
In his review for Allmusic, Scott Yanow stated: "once again it is the nonstop chugging of Sparks, Muhammad and either Leon Spencer or guest organist Don Patterson that fuels the fire".

== Track listing ==
All compositions by Leon Spencer except where noted

1. "Goin' to D.C." – 7:26
2. "Aires" (Don Patterson, Sonny Stitt) – 5:34
3. "Black Vibrations" – 6:43
4. "Calling Card" (Stitt) – 6:27
5. "Where Is Love?" (Lionel Bart) – 2:23
6. "Them Funky Changes" – 7:55

== Personnel ==
- Sonny Stitt – alto saxophone, tenor saxophone
- Virgil Jones – trumpet
- Leon Spencer Jr. (tracks 1, 3, 5 & 6), Don Patterson (tracks 2 & 4) – organ
- Melvin Sparks – guitar
- Idris Muhammad – drums
