= Four Dimensions (Don Patterson album) =

Studio album by Don Patterson
- Released: 1968
- Recorded: August 25, 1967
- Studio: Van Gelder Studio, Englewood Cliffs, New Jersey
- Genre: Jazz
- Length: 33:55
- Label: Prestige; PR 7533
- Producer: Don Schlitten

Don Patterson chronology
| Mellow Soul (1967) | Four Dimensions (1968) | Boppin' & Burnin' (1968) |

Four Dimensions is an album by organist Don Patterson recorded in 1967 and released on the Prestige label. The CD is titled Just Friends combined with a Don Patterson, Booker Ervin session without a guitarist.

== Reception ==
Professional ratings
Review scores
| Source | Rating |
|---|---|
| Allmusic | 3/5 stars |

Allmusic awarded the album 3 stars stating "it's nothing out of the ordinary, but it won't be a letdown to fans of the genre".

== Track listing ==
1. "Red Top" (Gene Ammons, Lionel Hampton, Ben Kynard) - 10:13
2. "Freddie Tooks Jr." (Patterson) - 5:43
3. "Last Train from Overbrook" (James Moody) - 3:55
4. "Embraceable You" (George Gershwin, Ira Gershwin) - 9:21
5. "Sandu" (Clifford Brown) - 4:43

== Personnel ==
- Don Patterson - organ
- Houston Person - tenor saxophone
- Pat Martino - guitar
- Billy James - drums
