= Boppin' & Burnin' =

Studio album by Don Patterson
- Released: 1968
- Recorded: February 22, 1968; New York City
- Genre: Jazz
- Length: 39:38
- Label: Prestige; PR 7563
- Producer: Don Schlitten

Don Patterson chronology
Four Dimensions (1967)	Boppin' & Burnin' (1968)	Opus De Don (1968)

Boppin' & Burnin' is an album by organist Don Patterson recorded in 1968 and released on the Prestige label.

== Reception ==
Professional ratings
Review scores
Source	Rating
Allmusic	4.5/5 stars

Scott Yanow of Allmusic says in his review of the album that "the repertoire is particularly strong" with Patterson soloing first on all 5 tracks.

== Track listing ==
All compositions by Howard McGhee except where noted.

1. "Pisces Soul" – 13:58
2. "Donna Lee" (Charlie Parker) – 6:15
3. "Island Fantasy" – 6:39
4. "Epistrophy" (Kenny Clarke, Thelonious Monk) – 5:09
5. "Now's the Time" (Charlie Parker) – 7:37

== Personnel ==
- Don Patterson – organ
- Howard McGhee – trumpet
- Charles McPherson – alto saxophone (tracks 1, 3–5)
- Pat Martino – guitar
- Billy James – drums
