= Primitivo Soul! =

Studio album by Sonny Stitt
- Released: 1964
- Recorded: December 31, 1963
- Studio: Van Gelder Studio, Englewood Cliffs
- Genre: Jazz blues
- Length: 34:15
- Label: Prestige; PRLP 7302

Sonny Stitt chronology
Stitt Goes Latin (1963)	Primitivo Soul! (1964)	My Main Man (1964)

Primitivo Soul! is an album by American saxophonist Sonny Stitt, recorded in 1963 and issued on Prestige Records in 1964.

Professional ratings
Review scores
Source	Rating
Allmusic	3/5 stars
The Rolling Stone Jazz Record Guide	3/5 stars

== Track listing ==
All compositions by Sonny Stitt except as indicated

1. "Slave Maidens" (Mussapere) - 7:34
2. "Baion Baby" - 4:40
3. "Estrellita" (Frank La Forge, Manuel Ponce) - 5:08
4. "Blue Blood Ritual" - 6:10
5. "Island Shout" - 4:30
6. "Barefoot Ball" - 6:13

== Personnel ==
- Sonny Stitt - alto saxophone
- Ronnie Mathews - piano
- Leonard Gaskin - bass
- Herbie Lovelle - drums
- Marcelino Valdez - congas
- Osvaldo "Chihuahua" Martinez - bongos
