= Shangri-La (Sonny Stitt album) =

Studio album by Sonny Stitt with Don Patterson
- Released: 1964
- Recorded: March 19, 1964
- Studio: Van Gelder Studio, Englewood Cliffs, New Jersey
- Genre: Jazz
- Label: Prestige; PR-7332
- Producer: Ozzie Cadena

Sonny Stitt chronology
My Main Man (1964)	Shangri-La (1964)	Soul People (1964)

Don Patterson chronology
Goin' Down Home (1964)	Shangri-La (1964)	The Exciting New Organ of Don Patterson (1964)

Shangri-La is an album by the saxophonist Sonny Stitt featuring the organist Don Patterson recorded in 1964 and released on the Prestige label.

== Reception ==
Professional ratings
Review scores
Source	Rating
AllMusic	3/5 stars
The Rolling Stone Jazz Record Guide	3/5 stars

The editors of AllMusic awarded the album three stars, and writer Richie Unterberger stated: "Shangri-La doesn't particularly stand out from other, similar albums he made at the time with organ, but it's a respectable set with both uptempo swingers and ballads."

A reviewer for Billboard noted that Patterson and James provide "first-rate support" to Stitt, and commented: "The tempos run the gamut from soulful to vibrant. It's all great jazz."

A writer for Negro Digest remarked: "Stitt has remained one of the most baffling... figures on the jazz scene. Nowhere is this more apparent than in... Shangri-La... The spark is still there, but the flame is missing. Where excitement is called for, there is often tedium."

== Track listing ==
All compositions by Sonny Stitt except as noted.

1. "My New Baby" - 7:21
2. "Misty" (Erroll Garner, Johnny Burke) - 4:34
3. "Soul Food" - 7:51
4. "Shangri-La" (Matty Malneck, Robert Maxwell, Carl Sigman) - 4:44
5. "Mama Don't Allow" (Cow Cow Davenport) - 5:54
6. "The Eternal One" - 5:49

== Personnel ==
- Sonny Stitt - tenor saxophone - vocal track 5
- Don Patterson - electronic organ
- Billy James - drums
