= Funk You! =

Studio album by Don Patterson
- Released: 1969
- Recorded: September 24, 1968; New York City
- Genre: Jazz
- Length: 39:38
- Label: Prestige; PR 7613
- Producer: Don Schlitten

Don Patterson chronology
Opus De Don (1968)	Funk You! (1969)	Oh Happy Day (1969)

Funk You! is an album by organist Don Patterson recorded in 1968 and released on the Prestige label.

== Reception ==
Professional ratings
Review scores
Source	Rating
Allmusic	3/5 stars

Allmusic awarded the album 3 stars stating, "as 1960s jazz with organ goes, this is pretty straight-ahead and boppish, rather than soul-jazz".

== Track listing ==
All compositions by Don Patterson except as indicated

1. "Ratio and Proportion" (Sonny Stitt) – 4:53
2. "Airegin" (Sonny Rollins) – 4:31
3. "Little Angie" – 6:14
4. "My Man String" – 4:43
5. "Funk in 3/4" – 5:23
6. "It's You or No One" (Sammy Cahn, Jule Styne) – 6:03

== Personnel ==
- Don Patterson – organ
- Charles McPherson – alto saxophone
- Sonny Stitt – alto saxophone, tenor saxophone
- Pat Martino – guitar
- Billy James – drums
