= It's Magic (Sonny Stitt album) =

Studio album by Sonny Stitt
- Released: March 22, 2005
- Recorded: 1969
- Studio: P.S. Studio, Chicago
- Genre: Jazz
- Length: 39:37
- Label: Delmark; DD-563
- Producer: Robert G. Koester

Sonny Stitt chronology
Come Hither (1969)	It's Magic (2005)	Brothers-4 (1969)

It's Magic is an album by saxophonist Sonny Stitt recorded in 1969 but not released by the Delmark label until 2005.

== Reception ==
Professional ratings
Review scores
Source	Rating
Allmusic	3.5/5 stars
All About Jazz	2.5/5 stars

Scott Yanow of Allmusic said "This previously unissued set by the great bebop saxophonist Sonny Stitt does not contain any real surprises. Stitt, who at the time was using a Varitone octave device on his horns (it is fortunately barely noticeable here), performs with his regular band of the period... Although his playing on both alto and tenor is quite professional and reasonably creative within the boundaries of his boppish music, Stitt sometimes sounds as if he is just going through the motions". In JazzTimes Chris Kelsey wrote "Sonny Stitt’s It’s Magic (Delmark), an organ-trio date recorded in 1969, is less magic than simple sleight-of-hand. ... Absent is the dauntless intensity he could bring to the table when the mood struck him. His use of a Varitone device-an early signal processor that added an octave below the tenor’s normal register-might have been an inhibiting factor, although the extra octave is just barely audible when it can be heard at all ... it’s like watching Houdini pull a rabbit out of a hat. It’s kind of cool, but you know he’s capable of much more". On All About Jazz Paul Olsen noted "It's Magic isn't a great album and it's by no means essential. But it's got its charms, though. It's a rough-sounding, raw recording with occasionally faltering sound, but that quality gives it a certain immediacy that benefits the variable performance—at times, anyway. Sometimes Stitt's great, sometimes he's not. The band's ability rises and falls. There's no faking it—and that's jazz, not magic"

== Track listing ==
1. "Four" (Miles Davis) – 3:49
2. "On Green Dolphin Street" (Bronisław Kaper, Ned Washington) – 3:42
3. "Parker's Mood" (Charlie Parker) – 3:50
4. "How High the Moon" (Morgan Lewis, Nancy Hamilton) – 3:49 Amazon
5. "Shake Your Head" (Bob Gerow, Sammy Cahn) – 3:39
6. "It's Magic" (Jule Styne, Cahn) – 3:46
7. "Getting Sentimental Over You" (George Bassman, Washington) – 4:11
8. "Just Friends" (John Klenner, Sam M. Lewis) – 4:55
9. "Body and Soul" (Johnny Green, Edward Heyman, Robert Sour, Frank Eyton) – 4:04
10. "They Can't Take That Away from Me" (George Gershwin, Ira Gershwin) – 3:52

== Personnel ==
- Sonny Stitt - alto saxophone, tenor saxophone, varitone
- Don Patterson - organ
- Billy James - drums
