= Oh Happy Day (Don Patterson album) =

Studio album by Don Patterson
- Released: 1969
- Recorded: June 2, 1969
- Studio: Van Gelder Studio, Englewood Cliffs, New Jersey
- Genre: Jazz
- Length: 38:07
- Label: Prestige; PR 7640
- Producer: Bob Porter

Don Patterson chronology
Funk You! (1968)	Oh Happy Day (1969)	Brothers-4 (1969)

Oh Happy Day is an album by organist Don Patterson recorded in 1969 and released on the Prestige label. The CD is titled Dem New York Dues combined with another Patterson session

== Reception ==
Professional ratings
Review scores
Source	Rating
Allmusic	2/5 stars

Allmusic awarded the album 2 stars.

== Track listing ==
All compositions by Don Patterson except as noted

1. "Oh Happy Day" (Edwin Hawkins) - 7:18
2. "Perdido" (Juan Tizol) - 8:48
3. "Good Time Theme" - 3:40
4. "Hip Trip" - 13:38
5. "Blue 'n' Boogie" (Dizzy Gillespie, Frank Paparelli) - 4:43

== Personnel ==
- Don Patterson - organ
- Virgil Jones - trumpet
- Houston Person - tenor saxophone
- George Coleman - tenor saxophone (tracks 2, 4 & 5)
- Pat Martino - guitar
- Frankie Jones - drums
