= Movin' Up! =

Studio album by Don Patterson
- Released: 1977
- Recorded: January 31, 1977; CI Recording Studios, New York City
- Genre: Jazz
- Length: 46:28
- Label: Muse; MR 5121
- Producer: Fred Seibert and Richie Cole

Don Patterson chronology
These Are Soulful Days (1973)	Movin' Up! (1977)	Why Not... (1978)

Professional ratings
Review scores
Source	Rating
Allmusic	4/5 stars

Movin' Up! is an album by organist Don Patterson recorded in 1977 and released on the Muse label.

== Reception ==
Scott Yanow of Allmusic states, "At the time that Don Patterson recorded this album (his next-to-last as a leader), organ records had become fairly rare... A fine effort that should please hard bop and soul-jazz collectors".

== Track listing ==
All compositions by Richie Cole except as indicated

1. "Room 608" (Horace Silver) - 5:49
2. "Bossa De Leon" - 9:41
3. "Trenton Makes the World Takes" - 5:58
4. "(The World of) Susie Wong" (Sammy Cahn, Jimmy Van Heusen) - 11:18
5. "The Good Life" (Sacha Distel, Jack Reardon) - 9:12
6. "Harold's House of Jazz" - 4:30

== Personnel ==
- Don Patterson - organ, Arp String Ensemble
- Richie Cole - alto saxophone
- Vic Juris - guitar
- Billy James - drums
