= Mellow Soul =

Studio album by Don Patterson
- Released: 1967
- Recorded: May 10, 1967
- Studio: Van Gelder Studio, Englewood Cliffs, New Jersey
- Genre: Jazz
- Length: 36:25
- Label: Prestige; PR 7510
- Producer: Cal Lampley

Don Patterson chronology
Soul Happening! (1966)	Mellow Soul (1967)	Four Dimensions (1967)

Mellow Soul is an album by organist Don Patterson recorded in 1967 and released on the Prestige label.

== Reception ==
Professional ratings
Review scores
Source	Rating
Allmusic	3/5 stars

Allmusic awarded the album 3 stars stating "A trio date with David Fathead Newman on sax and flute plus Billy James on drums".

== Track listing ==
All compositions by Don Patterson except as indicated

1. "Hump Snapa Blues" - 5:00
2. "Music to Think By" (Richard Boyell) - 4:00
3. "Darben the Redd Foxx" (James Moody) - 4:55
4. "Mellow Soul" - 6:40
5. "Head" (David Newman) - 6:05
6. "These Foolish Things" (Jack Strachey, Eric Maschwitz) - 9:45

== Personnel ==
- Don Patterson - organ
- David Newman - tenor saxophone, flute
- Billy James - drums
