= Night Crawler (album) =

Studio album by Sonny Stitt with Don Patterson
- Released: 1966
- Recorded: September 21, 1965
- Studio: Van Gelder Studio, Englewood Cliffs, New Jersey
- Genre: Jazz
- Length: 28:35
- Label: Prestige; PR-7436
- Producer: Cal Lampley

Sonny Stitt chronology
Pow! (1965)	Night Crawler (1966)	The Boss Men (1966)

Don Patterson chronology
Satisfaction! (1965)	Night Crawler (1965)	The Boss Men (1965)

Night Crawler is an album by saxophonist Sonny Stitt with organist Don Patterson recorded in 1965 and released on the Prestige label.

== Reception ==
Professional ratings
Review scores
Source	Rating
Allmusic	2.5/5 stars

Allmusic awarded the album 2½ stars stating: "This is not so much soul-jazz as solid, unexceptional straight-ahead boppish jazz with organ".

== Track listing ==
All compositions by Sonny Stitt except as noted

1. "All God's Chillun Got Rhythm" (Walter Jurmann, Gus Kahn, Bronisław Kaper) - 3:45
2. "Answering Service" - 4:40
3. "Tangerine" (Victor Schertzinger, Johnny Mercer) - 5:25
4. "Night Crawler" - 5:45
5. "Who Can I Turn To?" (Leslie Bricusse, Anthony Newley) - 3:05
6. "Star Eyes" (Gene de Paul, Don Raye) - 5:55

== Personnel ==
- Sonny Stitt - alto saxophone
- Don Patterson - organ
- Billy James - drums
