= Opus de Don =

Studio album by Don Patterson
- Released: 1968
- Recorded: June 5, 1968; New York City
- Genre: Jazz
- Labels: Prestige; PR 7577
- Producer: Don Schlitten

Don Patterson chronology
| Boppin' & Burnin' (1968) | Opus de Don (1968) | Funk You! (1968) |

Opus de Don is an album by organist Don Patterson recorded in 1968 and released on the Prestige label.

== Reception ==
Professional ratings
Review scores
| Source | Rating |
|---|---|
| Allmusic | 3/5 stars |

Allmusic awarded the album 3 stars.

== Track listing ==
All compositions by Don Patterson except as indicated

=== Side 1 ===
1. "Little Shannon" (Billy James) - 6:53
2. "Opus de Don" - 6:35
3. "Dem New York Dues" - 7:22

=== Side 2 ===
1. "Sir John" (Blue Mitchell) - 9:18
2. "Stairway to the Stars" (Matty Malneck, Mitchell Parish, Frank Signorelli) - 9:42

== Personnel ==
- Don Patterson - organ
- Blue Mitchell - trumpet
- Junior Cook - tenor saxophone
- Pat Martino - guitar
- Billy James - drums
