= The Boss Men =

Studio album by Don Patterson with Sonny Stitt and Billy James
- Released: 1966
- Recorded: December 28, 1965
- Studio: Van Gelder Studio, Englewood Cliffs, New Jersey
- Genre: Jazz
- Label: Prestige; PR 7466
- Producer: Cal Lampley

Don Patterson chronology
Night Crawler (1965)	The Boss Men (1966)	Soul Happening! (1966)

Sonny Stitt chronology
Night Crawler (1965)	The Boss Men (1964)	Soul in the Night (1965)

The Boss Men is an album by organist Don Patterson with saxophonist Sonny Stitt and drummer Billy James recorded in late 1965 and released on the Prestige label.

== Reception ==
Professional ratings
Review scores
Source	Rating
Allmusic	2.5/5 stars
The Penguin Guide to Jazz Recordings	3/4 stars

Allmusic awarded the album 2½ stars stating "While this is a respectable straight-ahead jazz-with-organ session, it's also so similar to so many other Prestige dates from the mid-'60s -- not to mention the other dates which featured the exact same three players as this LP does -- that it challenges the reviewer to come up with anything new, fresh, and exciting to say about the music".

== Track listing ==
All compositions by Don Patterson except where noted.

1. "Diane" (Art Pepper) – 5:40
2. "Someday My Prince Will Come" (Frank Churchill, Larry Morey) – 8:15
3. "Easy to Love" (Cole Porter) – 5:40
4. "What's New?" (Bob Haggart, Johnny Burke) – 5:30
5. "Big C's Rock" – 3:09
6. "They Say That Falling in Love Is Wonderful" (Irving Berlin) – 7:45

== Personnel ==
- Don Patterson – organ
- Sonny Stitt – alto saxophone
- Billy James – drums
