= Sonny Stitt =

American saxophonist (1924–1982)

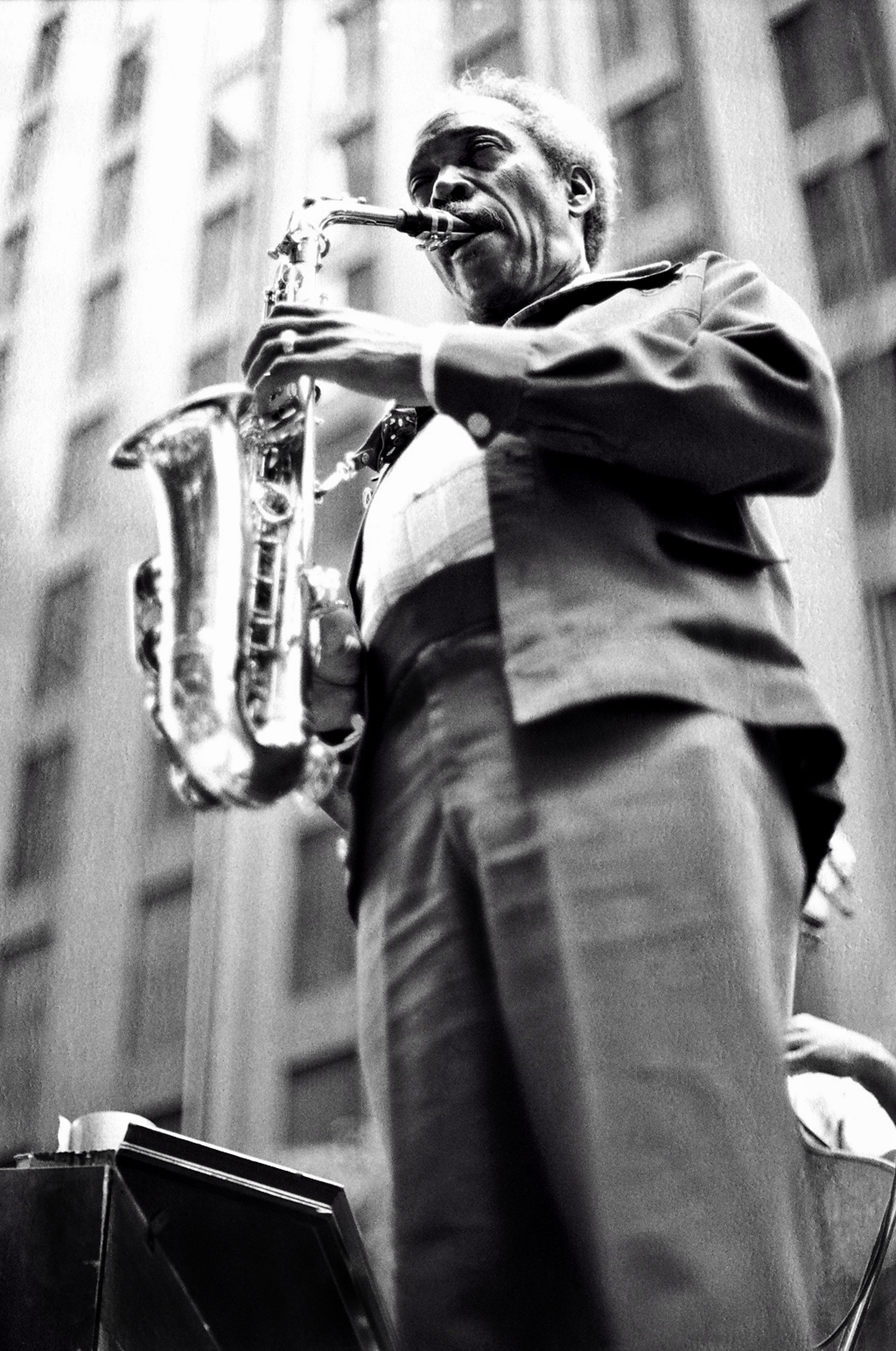
- Stitt in 1976

Background information
- Born: Edward Hammond Boatner Jr. February 2, 1924; Boston, Massachusetts, U.S.
- Died: July 22, 1982 (aged 58) Washington, D.C., U.S.
- Genre: Jazz
- Occupations: Musician, composer
- Instrument: Saxophone
- Years active: 1943–1982
- Labels: Prestige, Roost, Savoy, Verve, Argo, Impulse!, Atlantic, Roulette, Cadet, Muse, Flying Dutchman, Sonet, Who's Who in Jazz

Sonny Stitt (born Edward Hammond Boatner Jr.; February 2, 1924 – July 22, 1982) was an American jazz saxophonist of the bebop/hard bop idiom. Known for his warm tone, he was one of the best-documented saxophonists of his era, recording over 100 albums. He was nicknamed the "Lone Wolf" by jazz critic Dan Morgenstern because of his tendency to rarely work with the same musicians for long despite his relentless touring and devotion to the craft. Stitt was sometimes regarded as a Charlie Parker mimic early in his career, but gradually developed his own sound and style, particularly when performing on the tenor saxophone and even occasionally baritone saxophone.

== Early life ==
Edward Hammond Boatner Jr. was born in Boston, Massachusetts, and grew up in Saginaw, Michigan. He had a musical background: his father, Edward Boatner, was a baritone singer, composer, and college music professor; his brother was a classically trained pianist, his sister sang on Broadway and his mother was a piano teacher. He was placed for adoption in 1924 by his father and adopted by the Stitt family in Saginaw. He learned piano from the age of seven until his parents bought him a clarinet. He later began calling himself "Sonny". While in high school in Saginaw, he played in the Len Francke Band, a local popular swing band.

By age 15, Stitt was modeling his playing on Johnny Hodges and Benny Carter, but became a disciple of Charlie Parker after hearing him on a Jay McShann record. In 1943, while Sonny was part of Tiny Bradshaw's band that was visiting Kansas City, Stitt went searching for and met his idol.

"I told him I played alto. He said, 'Let's go someplace and blow.' We picked up a piano player and went to a place called the Gypsy Tea Room. We blew for about an hour, mostly some blues. Bird told me: 'You play too much like me.'"

As he often recalled, the two men had similar styles. Parker is alleged to have remarked, "Well, I'll be damned, you sound just like me", to which Stitt responded, "Well, I can't help the way I sound. It's the only way I know how to play." Kenny Clarke said of Stitt, "Even if there had not been a Bird, there would have been a Sonny Stitt."

During the 1940s, he played alto saxophone as a member of Tiny Bradshaw's big band, Billy Eckstine's big band with Gene Ammons and Dexter Gordon, and Dizzy Gillespie's big band. Stitt was a leader of Bebop Boys and Galaxy in 1946 and 1948, respectively.

When playing tenor saxophone Stitt seemed to break free from some of the criticism that he was imitating Parker's style, and began to develop a far more distinctive sound. He played with other bop musicians including Horace Parlan, Bud Powell, and Eddie "Lockjaw" Davis, a fellow tenor with a distinctly tough tone in comparison to Stitt, in the 1950s, and recorded a number of sides for Prestige Records as well as albums for Argo, Verve, and Roost. Stitt experimented with Afro-Cuban jazz in the late 1950s, and the results can be heard on his recordings for Roost and Verve, on which he teamed up with Thad Jones and Chick Corea for Latin versions of such standards as "Autumn Leaves".

In 1952, Stitt played with pianist Jimmy Jones, and the next year performed orchestral music with Johnny Richards. Under Quincy Jones's guidance in 1955, he played uptempos and ballads such as "My Funny Valentine" and "Star Dust" and the same year performed "Afterwards" and "There Will Never Be Another You" with Hank Jones. Stitt joined Dolo Coker in 1957 to perform "Blues for Yard" and "Blue Moon" before returning to Hank to perform "Cherokee".

Stitt joined Miles Davis briefly in 1960, and recordings with Davis's quintet can be found only in live settings on the tour of 1960. Concerts in Manchester and Paris are available commercially and also a number of concerts (which include sets by the earlier quintet with John Coltrane) on the record Live at Stockholm (Dragon), all of which featured Wynton Kelly, Jimmy Cobb, and Paul Chambers. However, Miles fired Stitt due to the excessive drinking habit he had developed, and replaced him with Hank Mobley. Later in the 1960s, Stitt paid homage to Parker on the album Stitt Plays Bird, which features Jim Hall on guitar.

Stitt recorded several times with his friend Gene Ammons in sessions that were interrupted by Ammons's own imprisonment for narcotics possession. The records recorded by these two saxophonists are regarded by many as some of both Ammons’s and Stitt's best work. The Ammons/Stitt partnership went down in posterity as one of the best dueling partnerships in jazz, alongside Zoot Sims and Al Cohn, and Johnny Griffin with Eddie "Lockjaw" Davis.

Stitt ventured into soul jazz and recorded with fellow tenor saxophonist Booker Ervin in 1964 on the Soul People album. Stitt also recorded with Duke Ellington alumnus Paul Gonsalves in 1963 for Impulse! on the Salt and Pepper album in 1964. Around that time, he appeared regularly at Ronnie Scott's in London, and a live 1964 encounter with Ronnie Scott, The Night Has a Thousand Eyes, eventually surfaced. Stitt recorded at Ronnie Scott's again in 1966 with resident guitarist Ernest Ranglin and British tenor saxophonist Dick Morrissey. Stitt was one of the first jazz musicians to experiment with the Selmer Varitone amplification system, as heard on the albums What's New!!! in 1966 and Parallel-a-Stitt in 1967.

== Later life ==
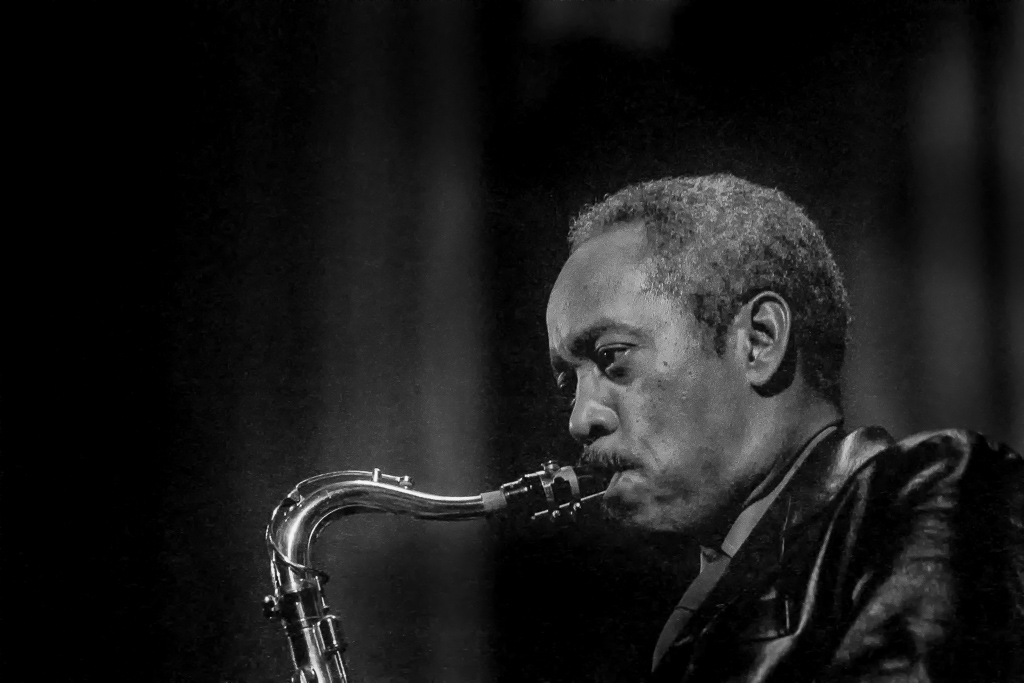
Stitt in 1971

In the 1970s Stitt slowed his recording output slightly but in 1972 produced another classic, Tune-Up!, which was and still is regarded by many jazz critics, such as Scott Yanow, as his definitive record. Indeed, his fiery and ebullient soloing was reminiscent of his earlier playing. In 1971 he managed to record four albums; Turn It On! with Leon Spencer, Melvin Sparks, Idris Muhammad, and Virgil Jones, You Talk That Talk! with Gene Ammons and George Freeman as new members of the group, Just the Way It Was (Live at the Left Bank) with Don Patterson and Billy James, and Black Vibrations which featured the same group as in Turn It On!. Just the Way It Was (Live at the Left Bank) which was released in 2000 also featured Stitt as an electric saxophone player, which was the first album which encompassed it.

Stitt's productivity dropped in the 1970s due to alcoholism. He drank heavily after giving up heroin in the late fifties and the abuse was beginning to take its toll. A series of alcohol-induced seizures caused Stitt to abstain and quit for good.

Stitt joined the all-star group The Giants of Jazz (which also featured Art Blakey, Dizzy Gillespie, Thelonious Monk, Kai Winding and bassist Al McKibbon) and made albums for Atlantic, Concord and EmArcy. His last recordings were made in Japan. A rejuvenated Stitt also toured with Red Holloway in the late 1970s, who noted a marked improvement in his playing. In 1975, Stitt performed with Ron Burton, Major Holley and drummer John Lewis at the Village Vanguard.

In 1981, Stitt performed with George Duvivier and Jimmy Cobb, Six weeks before his death, Stitt recorded two consecutive sessions which were with George Duvivier, Jimmy Cobb, Bill Hardman and either Junior Mance or Walter Davis Jr. on piano.

In 1982, Stitt was diagnosed with cancer, and died on July 22 in Washington, D.C. He is buried in a wall crypt at Fort Lincoln Cemetery, Brentwood, Maryland.

== Discography ==
=== As leader/co-leader ===
- 1949–1950: Sonny Stitt/Bud Powell/J. J. Johnson with Bud Powell ans J. J. Johnson (Prestige, 1956)
- 1950: Stitt's Bits (Prestige, 1958)
- 1950–1952: Kaleidoscope (Prestige, 1957)
- 1953: Sonny Stitt Playing Arrangements from the Pen of Johnny Richards (Roost, 1953)
- 1954: Jazz at the Hi-Hat (Roost, 1955) – live
- 1954: The Battle of Birdland with Eddie "Lockjaw" Davis (Roost, 1955) – live
- 1955: Sonny Stitt Plays Arrangements from the Pen of Quincy Jones (Roost, 1956)
- 1955: Sonny Stitt Plays (Roost, 1956)
- 1956: New York Jazz (Verve, 1956)
- 1956: For Musicians Only with Dizzy Gillespie and Stan Getz (Verve, 1957)
- 1957?: 37 Minutes and 48 Seconds with Sonny Stitt (Roost, 1957)
- 1957: Personal Appearance (Verve, 1957)
- 1957: Sonny Stitt with the New Yorkers (Roost, 1957)
- 1957: Only the Blues (Verve, 1958)
- 1957: Sonny Side Up with Dizzy Gillespie and Sonny Rollins (Verve, 1959)
- 1958: Sonny Stitt (Argo, 1958)
- 1958: The Saxophones of Sonny Stitt (Roost, 1959)
- 1958: Burnin' (Argo, 1960)
- 1959: The Hard Swing (Verve, 1958)
- 1959: Sonny Stitt Plays Jimmy Giuffre Arrangements (Verve, 1959)
- 1959: A Little Bit of Stitt (Roost, 1959)
- 1959: Sonny Stitt Sits in with the Oscar Peterson Trio (Verve, 1959) – with Oscar Peterson Trio
- 1959: The Sonny Side of Stitt (Roost, 1960)
- 1959: Sonny Stitt Blows the Blues (Verve, 1960)
- 1959: Sonny Stitt Swings the Most (Verve, 1960)
- 1959: Saxophone Supremacy (Verve, 1961)
- 1960: Stittsville (Roost, 1960)
- 1960: Sonny Side Up (Roost, 1961)
- 1960: Previously Unreleased Recordings (Verve, 1973)
- 1961: The Sensual Sound of Sonny Stitt (Verve, 1961) – with the Ralph Burns Strings
- 1961: Sonny Stitt at the D. J. Lounge (Argo, 1961) – live
- 1961: Dig Him! with Gene Ammons (Argo, 1961) – reissued as We'll Be Together Again (Prestige, 1969)
- 1961: Boss Tenors with Gene Ammons (Verve, 1961)
- 1960–1962: Stitt in Orbit (Roost, 1963)
- 1962: Stitt Meets Brother Jack (Prestige, 1962) – with Jack McDuff
- 1962: Boss Tenors in Orbit! with Gene Ammons (Verve, 1962)
- 1962: Soul Summit with Gene Ammons (Prestige, 1962) – with Jack McDuff
- 1962: Feelin's (Roost, 1962)
- 1962: Low Flame (Jazzland, 1962)
- 1962: Rearin' Back (Argo, 1962)
- 1962: Sonny Stitt & the Top Brass (Atlantic, 1963)
- 1963: My Mother's Eyes (Pacific Jazz, 1963) – with Charles Kynard
- 1963: Move on Over (Argo, 1963)
- 1963: Now! (Impulse!, 1963)
- 1963: Soul Shack (Prestige, 1963)
- 1963: Stitt Goes Latin (Roost, 1963)
- 1963: Stitt Plays Bird (Atlantic, 1964)
- 1963: Salt And Pepper (Impulse, 1964)
- 1963: Primitivo Soul! (Prestige, 1964)
- 1964: My Main Man with Bennie Green (Argo, 1964)
- 1964: Shangri-La with Don Patterson (Prestige, 1964)
- 1964: Soul People (Prestige, 1965) – with Booker Ervin and Don Patterson
- 1964: Live at Ronnie Scott's (Ronnie Scott's Jazz House, 1995) – live
- 1965: Inter-Action with Zoot Sims (Cadet, 1965)
- 1965: Broadway Soul (Colpix, 1965)
- 1965: Sax Expressions (Roost, 1965)
- 1965: The Matadors Meet the Bull (Roulette, 1965)
- 1965: Pow! (Prestige, 1967)
- 1965: Night Crawler (Prestige, 1966) – with Don Patterson
- 1966: Soul in the Night with Bunky Green (Cadet, 1966)
- 1966: What's New!!! (Roulette, 1966)
- 1966: I Keep Comin' Back! (Roulette, 1966)
- 1966: Deuces Wild (Atlantic, 1967) – introducing Robin Kenyatta
- 1961, 1967: Sonny Stitt Featuring Howard McGhee (Jazz Life, 1988) – featuring Howard McGhee. posthumous release.
- 1967: Parallel-a-Stitt (Roulette, 1967)
- 1968: Soul Electricity! (Prestige, 1968)
- 1968: Little Green Apples (Solid State, 1969)
- 1968: Made for Each Other (Delmark, 1972)
- 1969: Come Hither (Solid State, 1969)
- 1969: Night Letter (Prestige, 1970)
- 1969: It's Magic (Delmark, 2005) – posthumous release
- 1971: Turn It On! (Prestige, 1971)
- 1971: You Talk That Talk! with Gene Ammons (Prestige, 1972)
- 1971: Black Vibrations (Prestige, 1972)
- 1971: Just the Way It Was (Live at the Left Bank) (Label M, 2000) – live. posthumous release.
- 1972: Tune-Up! (Cobblestone, 1972)
- 1972: Goin' Down Slow (Prestige, 1972)
- 1972: Constellation (Cobblestone, 1972)
- 1972: So Doggone Good (Prestige, 1973)
- 1972: 12! (Muse, 1973)
- 1973: Mr. Bojangles (Cadet, 1973)
- 1973: The Champ (Muse, 1974)
- 1973: Together Again for the Last Time with Gene Ammons (Prestige, 1976)
- 1973: God Bless Jug and Sonny with Gene Ammons (Prestige, 2001) – live. posthumous release.
- 1973: Left Bank Encores with Gene Ammons (Prestige, 2002) – live. posthumous release.
- 1974: Satan (Cadet, 1974)
- 1975: Never Can Say Goodbye (Cadet, 1975)
- 1975: Mellow (Muse, 1975)
- 1975: Dumpy Mama (Flying Dutchman, 1975)
- 1975: In Walked Sonny (Sonet, 1975) – with Art Blakey & the Jazz Messengers
- 1975: My Buddy: Sonny Stitt Plays for Gene Ammons (Muse, 1976)
- 1975: Blues for Duke (Muse, 1978)
- 1976: Stomp Off Let's Go (Flying Dutchman, 1976)
- 1976: Forecast: Sonny & Red with Red Holloway (Catalyst, 1976)
- 1976: I Remember Bird (Catalyst, 1977)
- 1977: Sonny Stitt with Strings: A Tribute to Duke Ellington (Catalyst, 1977)
- 1978?: The Sonny Stitt Quintet (Finite, 1978)
- 1978: Sonny Stitt Meets Sadik Hakim (Progressive, 1981) – meets Sadik Hakim
- 1980: Groovin' High (Atlas, 1980) – with his west coast friends (Art Pepper, Terry Gibbs, et al.)
- 1980: Atlas Blues 'Blow! & Ballade' (Atlas, 1980) – with his west coast friends
- 1980: Sonny's Back (Muse, 1980)
- 1980: Good Life (Trio, 1982) – with Hank Jones
- 1981: In Style (Muse, 1982)
- 1981: Sonny, Sweets and Jaws: Live at Bubbas with Harry "Sweets" Edison, Eddie "Lockjaw" Davis (Who's Who in Jazz, 1982) – live
- 1981: Just in Case You Forgot How Bad He Really Was (32 Jazz, 1998) – posthumous release
- 1982: At Last (Seven Seas, 1982) – also as The Last Stitt Sessions Vol.1 (Muse, 1983). posthumous release.

=== As sideman ===
With Dizzy Gillespie

- The Modern Jazz Sextet (Verve, 1956) with Skeeter Best, John Lewis, Percy Heath and Charli Persip
- Duets (Verve, 1957) Quintets featuring Sonny Stitt or Sonny Rollins; with Ray Bryant, Tommy Bryant and Charlie Persip
- Sonny Side Up (Verve, 1957 [rel. 1959]) Sextet featuring Sonny Stitt and Sonny Rollins; with Ray Bryant, Tommy Bryant and Charlie Persip
- The Giants of Jazz (Atlantic, 1971) with Art Blakey, Al McKibbon, Thelonious Monk and Kai Winding
- The Bop Session (Sonet, 1975) with John Lewis, Hank Jones, Percy Heath and Max Roach

With Don Patterson

- Patterson's People (Prestige, 1964)
- The Boss Men (Prestige, 1965)
- Funk You! (Prestige, 1968)
- Brothers-4 (Prestige, 1969)
- Donny Brook (Prestige, 1970) – rec. 1969
- Tune Up! (Prestige, 1971) – rec. 1964, 1969

With others

- Gene Ammons, All Star Sessions (Prestige, 1959) – rec. 1950–1955
- Art Blakey, A Jazz Message (Impulse!, 1963)
- Miles Davis, Miles Davis in Stockholm 1960 Complete with John Coltrane and Sonny Stitt (Dragon, 1992)
- Milt Jackson, Loose Walk (Palcoscenico, 1980)
- Oscar Peterson, The Oscar Peterson Trio with Sonny Stitt, Roy Eldridge and Jo Jones at Newport (Verve, 1957)
- Zimbo Trio, Zimbo Convida Sonny Stitt (Clam, 1979)
