= Don Patterson (organist) =

American jazz musician (1936–1988)

- Born: July 22, 1936; Columbus, Ohio, U.S.
- Died: February 10, 1988 (aged 51) Philadelphia, Pennsylvania, U.S.
- Genres: Jazz
- Instruments: Organ

Don Patterson (July 22, 1936 – February 10, 1988) was an American jazz organist.

== Early life ==
Patterson played piano from childhood and was heavily influenced by Erroll Garner in his youth. In 1956, he switched to organ after hearing Jimmy Smith play the instrument.

== Career ==
In the early 1960s, he began playing regularly with Sonny Stitt, and he began releasing material as a leader on Prestige Records from 1964 (with Pat Martino and Billy James as sidemen). His most commercially successful album was 1964's Holiday Soul, which reached #85 on the Billboard 200 in 1967.

== Personal life ==
Patterson's troubles with drug addiction hobbled his career in the 1970s, during which he occasionally recorded for Muse Records and lived in Gary, Indiana. In the 1980s, he moved to Philadelphia and made a small comeback, but his health deteriorated over the course of the decade, and he died there in 1988.

== Discography ==
=== As leader ===
- Goin' Down Home (Cadet, 1963 [rel. 1966]) -with Paul Weeden, Billy James
- The Exciting New Organ of Don Patterson (Prestige, 1964) -with Booker Ervin
- Hip Cake Walk (Prestige, 1964) -with Booker Ervin
- Patterson's People (Prestige, 1964) -with Sonny Stitt, Booker Ervin
- Holiday Soul (Prestige, 1964) -with Pat Martino
- Satisfaction! (Prestige, 1965) -with Jerry Byrd
- The Boss Men (Prestige, 1965) -with Sonny Stitt, Billy James
- Soul Happening! (Prestige, 1966) -with Vinnie Corrao, Billy James
- Mellow Soul (Prestige, 1967) -with David "Fathead" Newman
- Four Dimensions (Prestige, 1967) -with Houston Person, Pat Martino, Billy James
- Boppin' & Burnin' (Prestige, 1968) -with Howard McGhee, Charles McPherson, Pat Martino
- Opus De Don (Prestige, 1968) -with Blue Mitchell, Junior Cook, Pat Martino, Billy James
- Funk You! (Prestige, 1968) -with Sonny Stitt, Charles McPherson, Pat Martino, Billy James
- Oh Happy Day (Prestige, 1969) -with Virgil Jones, Houston Person, George Coleman, Pat Martino
- Brothers-4 (Prestige, 1969) -with Sonny Stitt, Grant Green, Billy James
- Donny Brook (Prestige, 1969) -with Sonny Stitt, Grant Green, Billy James
- Tune Up! (Prestige, 1964 and 1969 [rel. 1971])
- The Return of Don Patterson (Muse MR-5005, 1972 [rel. 1974]) -with Eddie Daniels [note: reissued on CD in 1991 as The Genius Of The B-3]
- These Are Soulful Days (Muse MR-5032, 1973 [rel. 1974]) -with Jimmy Heath, Pat Martino, Albert Heath [note: reissued on CD in 1998 as Steady Comin' At 'Ya]
- Movin' Up! (Muse MR-5121, 1977) -with Richie Cole, Vic Juris, Billy James
- Why Not... (Muse MR-5148, 1978) -with Virgil Jones, Bootsie Barnes, Eddie McFadden, Idris Muhammad

=== LP/CD compilations ===
- The Best Of Don Patterson (Prestige 7704, 1969)
- The Best Of Don Patterson & The Jazz Giants (Prestige 7772, 1969)
- Sonny Stitt/Booker Ervin/Don Patterson – Soul People (Prestige, 1993) (compilation of Soul People + 2 tracks from Tune Up!, and 1 track previously unissued from the Soul Happening! sessions)
- Dem New York Dues (Prestige, 1995) (compilation of Opus De Don + Oh Happy Day)
- Legends Of Acid Jazz: Don Patterson/Booker Ervin (Prestige, 1996) (compilation of The Exciting New Organ Of Don Patterson + 1 track from Hip Cake Walk, and 1 track from Patterson's People)
- Legends Of Acid Jazz: Sonny Stitt/Don Patterson, Vol. 2 (Prestige, 1999) (compilation of Funk You! + Soul Electricity!)
- Legends Of Acid Jazz: Sonny Stitt (with Don Patterson) – Low Flame (Prestige, 1999) (compilation of Low Flame + Shangri-La)
- Legends Of Acid Jazz: Don Patterson/Booker Ervin/Houston Person – Just Friends (Prestige, 1999) (compilation of Four Dimensions, Hip Cake Walk [4 tracks], Patterson's People [2 tracks] + 1 track from Tune Up!)
- The Boss Men (Prestige, 2001) (compilation of Night Crawler, The Boss Men + 2 tracks from Patterson's People)
- Brothers 4 (Prestige, 2001) (compilation of Brothers-4, Donny Brook + 1 track from Tune Up!)

=== As sideman ===
With Eddie "Lockjaw" Davis

- I Only Have Eyes for You (Prestige, 1962)
- Trackin' (Prestige, 1962)

With Eric Kloss

- Introducing Eric Kloss (Prestige, 1965)
- Love and All That Jazz (Prestige, 1966)

With John Simon

- Legacy (Muse, 1986 [rel. 1996])

With Sonny Stitt

- Boss Tenors in Orbit! (Verve, 1962) -with Gene Ammons
- Feelin's... (Roost, 1962)
- Low Flame (Jazzland, 1962)
- Shangri-La (Prestige, 1964)
- Soul People (Prestige, 1964)
- Night Crawler (Prestige, 1965)
- Deuces Wild (Atlantic, 1966)
- Parallel-a-Stitt: Sonny Stitt On The Varitone (Roulette, 1967)
- Made for Each Other (Delmark, 1968 [rel. 1972])
- Soul Electricity! (Prestige, 1968) -with Billy Butler
- It's Magic (Delmark, 1969 [rel. 2005])
- Just The Way It Was (Live At The Left Bank) (Label M, 1971 [rel. 2000])
- Black Vibrations (Prestige, 1971) -with Melvin Sparks
