= Satisfaction! =

Studio album by Don Patterson
- Released: 1965
- Recorded: July 19, 1965
- Studio: Van Gelder Studio, Englewood Cliffs, New Jersey
- Genre: Jazz
- Length: 36:06
- Label: Prestige; PR 7430
- Producer: Cal Lampley

Don Patterson chronology
| Holiday Soul (1964) | Satisfaction! (1965) | Night Crawler (1965) |

Satisfaction! is an album by organist Don Patterson recorded in 1965 and released on the Prestige label.

== Reception ==
Professional ratings
Review scores
| Source | Rating |
|---|---|
| Allmusic | 3/5 stars |

Allmusic awarded the album 3 stars.

== Track listing ==
All compositions by Don Patterson except as indicated

1. "Bowl Full of Yok" - 10:13
2. "Goin' to Meeting" - 7:09
3. "John Brown's Body" (Traditional) - 8:15
4. "Satisfaction" - 3:25
5. "Walkin'" - 7:04

== Personnel ==
- Don Patterson - organ
- Jerry Byrd - guitar
- Billy James - drums
