= Holiday Soul (Don Patterson album) =

Studio album by Don Patterson
- Released: 1964
- Recorded: November 25, 1964
- Studio: Van Gelder Studio, Englewood Cliffs, New Jersey
- Genre: Jazz, Christmas
- Length: 37:35
- Label: Prestige; PR 7415
- Producer: Ozzie Cadena

Don Patterson chronology
Patterson's People (1964)	Holiday Soul (1964)	Satisfaction! (1965)

Holiday Soul is an album of Christmas music by organist Don Patterson recorded in 1964 and released on the Prestige label.

== Reception ==
Professional ratings
Review scores
Source	Rating
Allmusic	3/5 stars

Allmusic writer Kurt Edwards awarded the album 3 stars stating "The group put their own warm spin on winter classics, staying true to the melodies while giving themselves room to stretch out a bit. It adds up to a hopeful, fun record, perfect for any holiday party, no matter your affiliation" and noting the album "manage[s] to capture the best of the season's feeling". Don Patterson's most commercially successful album was 1964's Holiday Soul, which reached #85 on the Billboard 200 in 1967. Holiday Soul was reissued in 2015 on the LP format only.

== Track listing ==
1. "Rudolph the Red-Nosed Reindeer" (Johnny Marks) - 3:10
2. "What Are You Doing New Year's Eve?" (Frank Loesser) - 5:20
3. "You're All I Want for Christmas" (Seger Ellis, Glen Moore) - 2:50
4. "Silent Night" (Franz Gruber, Joseph Mohr) - 2:50
5. "O Holy Night" (Adolphe Adam, John Sullivan Dwight) - 3:15
6. "Santa Claus Is Coming to Town" (J. Fred Coots, Haven Gillespie) - 5:30
7. "Merry Christmas Baby" (Lou Baxter, Johnny Moore) - 6:00
8. "Jingle Bells" (James Pierpont) - 8:40

== Personnel ==
- Don Patterson - organ
- Pat Martino - guitar
- Billy James - drums
