= The Exciting New Organ of Don Patterson =

Studio album by Don Patterson with Booker Ervin
- Released: 1964
- Recorded: May 12, 1964
- Studio: Van Gelder Studio, Englewood Cliffs, New Jersey
- Genre: Jazz
- Length: 39:50
- Label: Prestige; PR 7323
- Producer: Ozzie Cadena

Don Patterson chronology
Shangri-La (1964)	The Exciting New Organ of Don Patterson (1964)	Hip Cake Walk (1964)

The Exciting New Organ of Don Patterson is the debut album by organist Don Patterson recorded in 1964 and released on the Prestige label.

== Reception ==
Professional ratings
Review scores
Source	Rating
Allmusic	4.5/5 stars

Allmusic awarded the album 4½ stars stating simply "Great album with Booker Ervin on tenor sax".

== Track listing ==
1. "S'Bout Time" (Don Patterson) - 11:00
2. "Up In Betty's Room" (Billy James, Don Patterson) - 5:10
3. "Oleo" (Sonny Rollins) - 3:00
4. "When Johnny Comes Marching Home" (Traditional) - 10:50
5. "The Good Life" (Sacha Distel, Jean Broussolle) - 9:50

== Personnel ==
- Don Patterson - organ
- Booker Ervin - tenor saxophone
- Billy James - drums
