= Low Flame =

Studio album by Sonny Stitt
- Released: 1962
- Recorded: April 4, 1962; New York City
- Genre: Jazz
- Label: Jazzland; JLP 71
- Producer: Orrin Keepnews

Sonny Stitt chronology
Feelin's (1962)	Low Flame (1962)	Stitt in Orbit (1960-62)

Professional ratings
Review scores
Source	Rating
Allmusic	3/5 stars

Low Flame is an album by saxophonist Sonny Stitt recorded in 1962 and released on the Jazzland label.

== Reception ==
The Allmusic review stated: "This small combo jazz fits between Bebop and soul-jazz, dominated by group-penned material. Stitt gets an especially smoky tone on the ballads, particularly on the title track".

== Track listing ==
All compositions by Sonny Stitt except as indicated

1. "Low Flame" - 4:59
2. "Put Your Little Foot Right Out" (Larry Spier) - 5:25
3. "Cynthia Sue" (Paul Weeden) - 6:02
4. "Donald Duck" (Don Patterson) - 4:40
5. "Close Your Eyes" (Bernice Petkere) - 3:43
6. "Silly Billy" - 4:58
7. "Baby, Do You Ever Think of Me" - 2:55
8. "Fine and Dandy" (Paul James, Kay Swift) - 7:56

== Personnel ==
- Sonny Stitt - alto saxophone, tenor saxophone - on 1,2 and 6
- Don Patterson - organ
- Paul Weeden - guitar
- Billy James - drums
