= Brothers-4 =

Studio album by Don Patterson with Sonny Stitt
- Released: 1969
- Recorded: September 15, 1969
- Studio: Van Gelder Studio, Englewood Cliffs, New Jersey
- Genre: Jazz
- Label: Prestige; PR 7738
- Producer: Bob Porter

Don Patterson chronology
Oh Happy Day (1969)	Brothers-4 (1969)	Donny Brook (1969)

Sonny Stitt chronology
It's Magic (1969)	Brothers-4 (1969)	Night Letter (1969)

Brothers-4 is an album by organist Don Patterson with saxophonist Sonny Stitt recorded in 1969 and released on the Prestige label. The album features guitarist Grant Green, who was credited as Blue Grant for contractual reasons, being then signed to Blue Note Records. The 2001 CD release added 6 bonus tracks recorded at the same session but issued on other albums.

== Reception ==
Professional ratings
Review scores
Source	Rating
Allmusic	4/5 stars
The Penguin Guide to Jazz Recordings	2.5/4 stars

Allmusic awarded the album 4 stars stating "not the crowning achievement for any of the principals, but they still stand in the front ranks of organ jazz".

== Track listing ==
All compositions by Don Patterson except where noted.

1. "Brothers 4" – 8:52
2. "Creepin' Home" (Billy James) – 6:50
3. "Alexander's Ragtime Band" (Irving Berlin) – 8:26
4. "Walk On By" (Burt Bacharach, Hal David) -8:35
5. "Donny Brook" (Grant Green) – 8:25 Bonus track on CD reissue
6. "Mud Turtle" – 9:58 Bonus track on CD reissue
7. "St. Thomas" (Sonny Rollins) – 5:28 Bonus track on CD reissue
8. "Good Bait" (Count Basie, Tadd Dameron) – 8:31 Bonus track on CD reissue
9. "Starry Night" (John H. Densmore) – 5:50 Bonus track on CD reissue
10. "Tune Up" (Miles Davis) – 5:24 Bonus track on CD reissue

== Personnel ==
- Don Patterson – organ
- Sonny Stitt – varitone, tenor saxophone
- Grant Green – guitar
- Billy James – drums
