= Soul Happening! =

Studio album by Don Patterson
- Released: 1966
- Recorded: August 5, 1966
- Studio: Van Gelder Studio, Englewood Cliffs, New Jersey
- Genre: Jazz
- Length: 34:16
- Label: Prestige; PR 7484
- Producer: Cal Lampley

Don Patterson chronology
The Boss Men (1965)	Soul Happening! (1966)	Mellow Soul (1967)

Soul Happening! is an album by organist Don Patterson recorded in 1966 and released on the Prestige label.

== Reception ==
Professional ratings
Review scores
Source	Rating
Allmusic	3/5 stars

Allmusic awarded the album 3 stars.

== Track listing ==
1. "Wade in the Water" (Traditional) 5:25
2. "La Bamba" (Traditional) 5:00
3. "Strangers in the Night" (Bert Kaempfert, Charles Singleton, Eddie Snyder) 7:35
4. "Up Tight" (Stevie Wonder, Sylvia Moy, Henry Cosby) 3:20
5. "Love Letters" (Victor Young, Edward Heyman) 6:56
6. "Wee Dot" (J. J. Johnson) 6:00

== Personnel ==
- Don Patterson - organ
- Vincent "Vinnie" Corrao - guitar
- Billy James - drums
