= Goin' Down Home =

Studio album by Don Patterson
- Released: 1966
- Recorded: January 22, 1963; Ter Mar Recording Studios, Chicago, Illinois
- Genre: Jazz
- Label: Cadet; LP-787
- Producer: Esmond Edwards

Don Patterson chronology
Goin' Down Home (1966)	Shangri-La (1964)

Goin' Down Home is an album by organist Don Patterson recorded in Chicago in 1963 and released on the Cadet label in 1966. Although it is the earliest recordings led by Patterson it as not released until after he had produced several albums for Prestige Records.

== Reception ==
Professional ratings
Review scores
Source	Rating
Allmusic	4/5 stars

Allmusic awarded the album 4 stars stating simply "Includes the Nat Adderley tune "Worksong".

== Track listing ==
All compositions by Sonny Stitt except as indicated

1. "Little Duck" - 4:25
2. "John Brown's Body" (Traditional) - 4:58
3. "I'm Just a Lucky So-and-So" (Duke Ellington) - 4:35
4. "Frankie Mc" (Paul Weedon) - 3:54
5. "It's Magic" - 5:04
6. "Goin' Down Home" - 4:17
7. "Trick Bag" (Weedon) - 5:43
8. "1197 Fair" - 4:49
9. "Work Song" (Nat Adderley) - 5:07

== Personnel ==
- Don Patterson - organ
- Paul Weedon - guitar
- Billy James - drums
