= Hip Cake Walk =

Studio album by Don Patterson with Booker Ervin
- Released: 1964
- Recorded: May 12 and July 10, 1964
- Studio: Van Gelder Studio, Englewood Cliffs, New Jersey
- Genre: Jazz
- Length: 39:50
- Label: Prestige; PR 7349
- Producer: Ozzie Cadena

Don Patterson chronology
The Exciting New Organ of Don Patterson (1964)	Hip Cake Walk (1964)	Patterson's People (1964)

Hip Cake Walk is an album by organist Don Patterson recorded in 1964 and released on the Prestige label.

== Reception ==
Professional ratings
Review scores
Source	Rating
Allmusic	4/5 stars

Allmusic writer Eugene Chadbourne awarded the album 4 stars stating "Organist Don Patterson went through a richly productive period in the '60s, fashioning a fortress of funky organ jazz hi-fi on the Prestige label" and noting the album has "special status".

== Track listing ==
All compositions by Don Patterson except as noted

1. "Sister Ruth" - 5:00
2. "Donald Duck" - 5:45
3. "Rosetta" - 7:15
4. "Hip Cake Walk" - 16:40
5. "Under the Boardwalk" (Kenny Young, Arthur Resnick) - 2:50
- Recorded at Van Gelder Studio in Englewood Cliffs, New Jersey on May 12 (track 4) and July 10 (tracks 1–3 & 5), 1964

== Personnel ==
- Don Patterson - organ
- Booker Ervin - tenor saxophone (tracks 1–4)
- Leonard Houston - alto saxophone (track 4)
- Billy James - drums
