= Patterson's People =

Studio album by Don Patterson with Sonny Stitt and Booker Ervin
- Released: 1965
- Recorded: March 19, May 12 and July 10, 1964
- Studio: Van Gelder Studio, Englewood Cliffs, New Jersey
- Genre: Jazz
- Length: 39:50
- Label: Prestige; PR 7381
- Producer: Ozzie Cadena

Don Patterson chronology
| Hip Cake Walk (1964) | Patterson's People (1965) | Holiday Soul (1964) |

Patterson's People is an album by organist Don Patterson recorded in 1964 and released on the Prestige label.

== Reception ==
Professional ratings
Review scores
| Source | Rating |
|---|---|
| Allmusic | 4/5 stars |

Allmusic writer Eugene Chadbourne awarded the album 4 stars stating "It's classic stuff".

== Track listing ==
All compositions by Don Patterson except as noted

1. "Love Me with All Your Heart" (Rafael Gaston Perez) – 6:20
2. "42639" (Sonny Stitt) – 5:20
3. "Please Don't Talk About Me When I'm Gone" (Sam H. Stept, Sidney Clare) – 5:40
4. "Sentimental Journey" (Les Brown, Bud Green) – 10:55
5. "Theme For Dee" – 6:30
- Recorded at Van Gelder Studio in Englewood Cliffs, New Jersey on March 19 (tracks 2 & 3), May 12 (track 1) and July 10 (tracks 4 & 5), 1964

== Personnel ==
- Don Patterson – organ
- Sonny Stitt – alto saxophone, tenor saxophone, vocals (tracks 2 & 3)
- Booker Ervin – tenor saxophone (tracks 1 & 4)
- Billy James – drums
