= Roost Records =

American record label

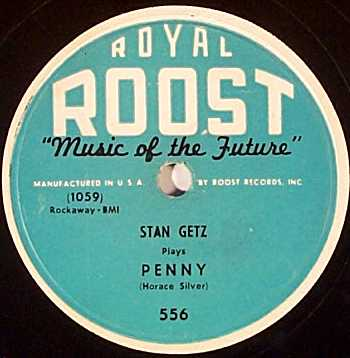
- Parent company: Warner Music Group
- Founded: 1949
- Founder: Teddy Reig
- Defunct: 1958
- Distributor(s): Roulette Records
- Genre: Jazz
- Country of origin: U.S.
- Location: New York City

Roost Records (also known as Royal Roost Records) was a jazz record label established in 1949 by music producer Teddy Reig in New York City. The label was named after a club in New York City. Saxophonist Stan Getz, early in his career, recorded for the label, as did guitarist Johnny Smith. Smith was the bestselling artist on the Roost label.

The label's catalogue included Sonny Stitt, Coleman Hawkins, Bud Powell, Seldon Powell, Billy Taylor, and Gene Quill. In the latter 1950s, Roost's music was distributed by Roulette Records. Roost was then acquired by Roulette, which sold music under the label's name until 1971.

Since 2013, Roost Records' catalogue is owned by Warner Music Group via Parlophone.

== See also ==
- List of record labels
