= Varitone =

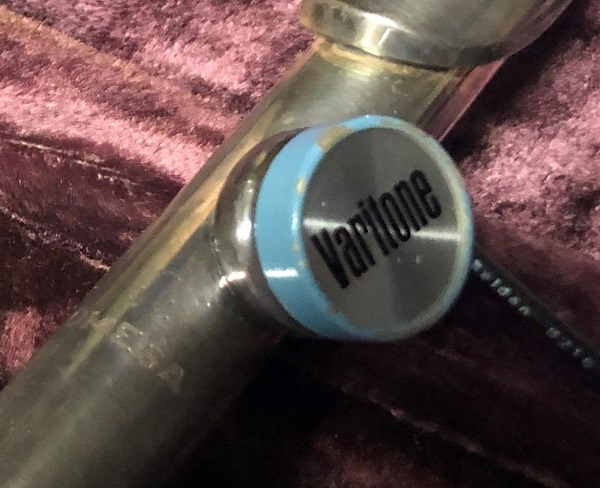

The Varitone was a woodwind pickup and effects unit, allowing direct amplification of the instrument (i.e. without a standard microphone) and the introduction of various electronic effects. It was marketed in 1967 by the Selmer Company, which developed units for flute, saxophone, and clarinet. The system included an integrated pickup microphone and a control box which allowed the player to use effects such as tremolo, basic EQ ("bright" and "dark"), simultaneous sub-octaves and echo in conjunction with a purpose-built amplifier. The ceramic microphone was developed to withstand high sound pressure and moisture levels, and built into the head joint of the flute, the neck-joint of the saxophone, and the barrel joint of the clarinet. The pickup was wired to a preamplifier and control box which was either mounted to the bottom key guard, clipped to the player's belt, or hung on a cord around the players neck. The Buescher Band Instrument Company, owned by Selmer, was also offering the Varitone by 1968.

Similar products included the Hammond Condor, the Conn Multi-vider and the Maestro series of analogue effects boxes marketed by Chicago Musical Instruments.

Notable Varitone players were Eddie Harris, Lou Donaldson, Lee Konitz, Moe Koffman and Sonny Stitt. Michael Brecker also used a Varitone extensively during his time in the Brecker Bros. Band.

The Varitone could also be used with brass instruments by soldering a pick-up onto the lead pipe. Jazz trumpeter Clark Terry used it on a 1967 recording for Impulse! Records titled It's What's Happenin' (Terry was a Selmer endorser at the time).

Varitone is also the name of a device used for changing the sounds of an electric guitar, featured on Gibson's BB King "Lucille" signature ES-355.

== See also ==
- Saxophonics
