= Tiny Grimes discography =

This is the discography for American jazz guitarist Tiny Grimes.

== As leader ==
- Blues Groove (Prestige #7138, 1958; Swingville #2035; Prestige #7753, 1970; OJC #817, 1994) – with Coleman Hawkins
- Callin' the Blues (Prestige #7144, 1958; Swingville #2004; OJC #191, 1985) – with J. C. Higginbotham and Eddie "Lockjaw" Davis
- Tiny in Swingville (Swingville #2002, 1959; OJC #1796, 1992) – with Jerome Richardson
- Big Time Guitar With Organ And Rhythm (United Artists #UAL-3232/UAS-6232, 1962)
- Chasin With Milt (Disques Black And Blue #33.017, 1968) – with Milt Buckner
- Tiny Grimes [AKA Food For Thought] (Disques Black And Blue #33.030, 1970)
- Food For Thought (The Definitive Black & Blue Sessions) (Black & Blue #BB-981, 2004) CD
- The Guitar Album (Columbia #KG-31045, 1972) 2-LP set - note: live recording from a 1971 concert at Town Hall, NYC featuring seven legendary guitarists; Tiny's trio performs 5 songs (all of Side 3): Frantic, Watermelon Man, Blues For Connie, Food For Thought, Threequarter Moon.
- Profoundly Blue (Muse #MR-5012, 1973) – with Houston Person and Harold Mabern
- Some Groovy Fours (Disques Black And Blue #33.067, 1974; Classic Jazz CJ-114, 1978)
- Some Groovy Fours (The Definitive Black & Blue Sessions) (Black & Blue #BB-874, 2002) CD
- One Is Never Too Old To Swing (Sonet #SNTF-736, 1977) – with Roy Eldridge and Frank Wess
- Live In Paris, 1974 (France's Concert Records-Esoldun #FC-133, 1989) – with Arnett Cobb and Lloyd Glenn

== As sideman ==
With Art Tatum

- Art Tatum Trio: Piano Solos With Rhythm Accompaniment (Brunswick #BL-58013, 1950) – note: recordings made for the Brunswick label in 1944.
- Art Tatum Trio (Dial #DLP-206, 1950) – note: recordings made for the Comet label in 1944.
- The Complete Trio Sessions With Tiny Grimes & Slam Stewart, Vol. 1 (Official #3001, 1988)
- The Complete Trio Sessions With Tiny Grimes & Slam Stewart, Vol. 2 (Official #3002, 1988)
- Trio Days (Charly-LeJazz #CD43, 1999) CD - note: recordings made for the Brunswick, Comet, and Asch labels in 1944.

With Charlie Parker

- The Complete Savoy Studio Sessions (Savoy #SJL-5500, 1978) 5-LP set - note: includes the 4 tracks that Tiny's quartet recorded with Bird for Savoy in 1944: Tiny's Tempo, I'll Always Love You Just The Same, Romance Without Finance (Is A Nuisance), Red Cross.
- The Complete Savoy & Dial Master Takes (Savoy Jazz #17149, 2002) 3-CD set - note: a new "remastered" release that also includes the 4 tracks with Tiny's quartet from 1944.

With Coleman Hawkins

- The Chronological Coleman Hawkins 1944-1945 (Classics #863, 1996) CD - note: includes the 4 tracks that Tiny recorded with Hawkins & His All Stars for Regis/Manor in 1944: All The Things You Are, Step On It, Riding On 52nd Street, Memories Of You.
- Hawk Eyes (Prestige, 1959)
- Things Ain't What They Used to Be (Swingville, 1961) as part of the Prestige Swing Festival

With Hot Lips Page

- The Chronological Hot Lips Page 1940-1944 (Classics #809, 1996) CD - note: includes the 4 tracks that Tiny recorded with Page & His Orchestra for Savoy in 1944: I Got What It Takes, Good For Stompin', Lips Blues (Double Trouble Blues), Blooey.

With Cozy Cole

- The Chronological Cozy Cole 1944-1945 (Classics #865, 1996) CD - note: includes the 8 tracks that Tiny recorded with Cole's All Stars for Continental in 1944: Willow Weep For Me, Look Here (Cool Jive), I Don't Stand A Ghost Of A Chance (With You), Take It On Back, Memories Of You, Comes The Don (Harlem Nocturne), When Day Is Done, The Beat (The Drag); also includes the 8 tracks that Tiny recorded with Cole's Quintet for Guild in 1945: Hallelujah, Stompin' At The Savoy, Dat's Love, Through For The Night, Strictly Drums, Night Wind, Why Regret, Now's The Time.

With Ike Quebec

- The Chronological Ike Quebec 1944-1946 (Classics #957, 1997) CD - note: includes the 12 tracks that Tiny recorded with Quebec's quintet/septet for Blue Note in 1944 and 1945: Tiny's Exercise, She's Funny That Way, (Back Home Again In) Indiana, Blue Harlem, Hard Tack, If I Had You, Mad About You, Facin' The Face, I Found A New Baby, I Surrender Dear, Topsy, Cup-Mute Clayton.

With John Hardee

- The Chronological John Hardee 1946-1948 (Classics #1136, 2001) CD - note: includes the 4 tracks that Tiny recorded with Hardee's quintet for Blue Note in 1946: Tired, Blue Skies, Hardee's Partee, Idaho.

With Earl Bostic

- The Chronological Earl Bostic 1945-1948 (Classics 'Blues & Rhythm Series' #5005, 2001) CD - note: includes the 4 tracks that Tiny recorded with Bostic & His Orchestra for Majestic in 1945: The Man I Love, Hurricane Blues, The Major And The Minor, All On.

With Buck Clayton

- The Classic Swing Of Buck Clayton (Riverside #12-142, 1960; OJC #1709, 1990) – note: includes the 4 tracks that Tiny recorded with Clayton's Big Four for H.R.S. (Hot Record Society) in 1946: Dawn Dance, Well-A-Poppin', It's Dizzy, Basie's Morning Bluesicale.

With Dud Bascomb and Paul Bascomb

- The Chronological Dud And Paul Bascomb 1945-1947 (Classics 'Blues & Rhythm Series' #5061, 2003) CD - note: includes the 4 tracks that Tiny recorded with the Bascomb brothers and their orchestra (sextet) for Alert in 1946: (Back Home Again In) Indiana, Sweet Georgia Brown, After Hours [with the great Avery Parrish on piano], Walkin' Blues.

With Gatemouth Moore

- Cryin' And Singin' The Blues: The Complete National Recordings 1945-1946 (Savoy Jazz #17327, 2004) CD - note: includes the 4 tracks that Tiny's septet recorded with Gatemouth for National in 1946: Christmas Blues, Let's Go Back And Try One More Time, Love Doctor Blues, Nobody Knows The Way I Feel (This Morning).

With Walter Brown

- The Chronological Walter Brown 1945-1947 (Classics 'Blues & Rhythm Series' #5010, 2001) CD - note: includes the 4 tracks that Tiny's sextet recorded with Walter for Signature in 1947: Open The Door Richard, My Second Best Woman, Let's Get Some Understandin', I'm Living For You.

With Felix Gross

- The Complete Recordings 1947-1955 (Blue Moon #6040, 2004) CD - note: includes the 4 tracks that Tiny recorded with Gross & His Orchestra for Savoy in 1949: Love For Christmas, Who Can You Be, You Don't Love Me, You're Great To Me.

With Billie Holiday

- The Complete Decca Recordings (GRP #GRD-2-601, 1991) CD - note: includes the 4 tracks that Tiny recorded with Bob Haggart & His Orchestra backing Lady Day in August 1945: Don't Explain, Big Stuff, You Better Go Now, What Is This Thing Called Love; also includes the 2 tracks that Tiny recorded with Bill Stegmeyer's orchestra backing Lady Day in January 1946: Good Morning Heartache, No Good Man. [all 6 tracks are located on Disc 1 of this 2-CD set]
- Billie's Blues (Blue Note #48786, 1988) CD - note: includes the 4 tracks that Tiny's sextet recorded with Lady Day for Aladdin in 1951: Detour Ahead, Be Fair To Me, Rocky Mountain Blues, Blue Turning Grey Over You.

With The Prestige Blues Swingers

- Outskirts Of Town [with Art Farmer, Idrees Sulieman, George "Buster" Cooper, Jerome Richardson, Jimmy Forrest, Pepper Adams, Ray Bryant] (Prestige #7145, 1958; Prestige #7787, 1970; OJC #1717, 1992)

With Johnny Hodges

- Triple Play (RCA Victor, 1967)

With Johnny Letman

- A Funky Day In Paris (Disques Black And Blue #33.015, 1968)

With Hal Singer

- Milt And Hal (Disques Black And Blue #33.016, 1968) – with Milt Buckner too!

With Illinois Jacquet

- The Blues; That's Me! (Prestige #7731, 1969; OJC #614, 1991)

With Ray Nance

- Body And Soul (Solid State #18062, 1970)

With Jay McShann

- Jumpin' Blues (Disques Black And Blue #33.039, 1970)
- Jumpin' The Blues (The Definitive Black & Blue Sessions) (Black & Blue #BB-979, 2004) CD

With Lloyd Glenn

- Old Time Shuffle (Disques Black And Blue #33.077, 1974)
- Old Time Shuffle (The Definitive Black & Blue Sessions) (Black & Blue #BB-923, 2002) CD

With Arnett Cobb

- Jumpin' At The Woodside (Disques Black And Blue #33.175, 1974)
- Live In Paris, 1974 (France's Concert Records-Esoldun #FC-133, 1989)
- Jumpin' At The Woodside (The Definitive Black & Blue Sessions) (Black & Blue #BB-940, 2002) CD

With Earl "Fatha" Hines

- An Evening With Earl Hines: Live At Dinklers Motor Inn (Chiaroscuro #CR-116, 1973; Vogue #VDJ-534, 1977) 2-LP set
- Earl Hines Quartet (Chiaroscuro #CR-169, 1977)

With Rahsaan Roland Kirk

- Boogie Woogie String Along For Real (Warner Bros. #BSK-3085, 1977)

== Compilations ==
- The Cats & The Fiddle: I Miss You So (Bluebird #AXM2-5531, 1976) 2-LP set - note: Tiny recorded 16 songs with 'The Cats' in 1941; 11 of the 16 are included here.
- The Cats And The Fiddle: We Cats Will Swing For You (ASV Living Era #AJA-5475, 2003) CD
- The Complete Blue Note Forties Recordings Of Ike Quebec And John Hardee (Mosaic #MR4-107, 1984) 4-LP set
- Tiny Grimes: Rockin' And Sockin' (Oldie Blues #OL-8009, 1985)
- Tiny Grimes And His Rocking Highlanders: Loch Lomond (Whiskey, Women, And... #KM-706, 1986)
- Tiny Grimes And His Rocking Highlanders: Rock The House 1947-1953 (Swingtime #ST-1016, 1987)
- Tiny Grimes And His Rocking Highlanders (Riverboat #900.261, 198?)
- Tiny Grimes & His Rockin' Highlanders: 1950 (Caracol #CAR-442, 198?)
- Tiny Grimes And His Rocking Highlanders, Volume One (Krazy Kat #KK-804, 1986; Collectables #5304, 1990)
- Tiny Grimes And His Rocking Highlanders, Volume Two (Krazy Kat #KK-817, 1986; Collectables #5317, 1990)
- Tiny Grimes And Friends [including The Cats And The Fiddle] (Collectables #5321, 1990)
- Tiny Grimes: Electric Guitar Master 1944-1947 (EPM Musique #159372, 1999) CD
- The Chronological Tiny Grimes 1944-1949 (Classics 'Blues & Rhythm Series' #5048, 2003) CD - note: recordings made for the Savoy, Blue Note, and Atlantic labels.
- The Chronological Tiny Grimes 1949-1951 (Classics 'Blues & Rhythm Series' #5106, 2004) CD - note: recordings made for the Gotham label.
- The Chronological Tiny Grimes 1951-1954 (Classics 'Blues & Rhythm Series' #5146, 2005) CD - note: recordings made for the United, Gotham, Atlantic, Red Robin, and Apollo labels.
- The Complete Tiny Grimes, Vol. 1: 1944-1946 (Blue Moon #6005, 2004) CD
- The Complete Tiny Grimes, Vol. 2: 1947-1950 (Blue Moon #6006, 2004) CD
- The Complete Tiny Grimes, Vol. 3: 1950 (Blue Moon #6007, 2004) CD
- The Complete Tiny Grimes, Vol. 4: 1950-1953 (Blue Moon #6008, 2004) CD
- The Complete Tiny Grimes, Vol. 5: 1953-1954 (Blue Moon #6009, 2004) CD
- Tiny Grimes: Blues Groove 1958-1959 (Fresh Sound #FSRCD-644, 2011) 2-CD set
- Tiny Grimes: Three Classic Albums Plus (Avid Jazz #AMSC-1188, 2016) 2-CD set - note: includes all of the tracks from the albums, Blues Groove, Callin' The Blues, and Big Time Guitar With Organ And Rhythm, plus 5 of the 6 tracks from Tiny In Swingville.
