= Let Me Tell You 'bout It =

Studio album by Leo Parker
- Released: 1961
- Recorded: September 9, 1961
- Studio: Van Gelder Studio; Englewood Cliffs, NJ
- Genre: Jazz
- Length: 37:58 (original LP); 50:48 (CD reissue)
- Label: Blue Note; BST 84087
- Producer: Alfred Lion

Leo Parker chronology
Billy in the Lion's Den (1957)	Let Me Tell You 'bout It (1961)	Rollin' with Leo (1961)

Let Me Tell You 'bout It is the debut album by American jazz saxophonist Leo Parker, recorded on September 9, 1961 and released on Blue Note later that year. The sextet features horn section Bill Swindell and John Burks, and rhythm section Yusuf Salim, Stan Conover and Purnell Rice.

== Reception ==
Professional ratings
Review scores
Source	Rating
AllMusic	4/5 stars

The AllMusic review by Scott Yanow states, "Parker (who is joined by obscure sidemen) sounds in top form during his varied program which includes several hard swingers."

== Track listing ==
All tracks are written by Leo Parker, except as noted.

No.	Title	Writer(s)	Length
1.	"Glad Lad"		5:17
2.	"Blue Leo"	Parker; Ike Quebec	5:06
3.	"Let Me Tell You 'bout It"	Robert Lewis	4:18
4.	"Vi"	Lewis	4:41
5.	"Parker's Pals"		6:21
6.	"Low Brown"	Yusef Salim	5:49
7.	"TCTB"	Parker, Swindell	6:26
8.	"The Lion's Roar" (CD bonus track)	Russell Jacquet; Parker	4:26
9.	"Low Brown" (Long Version; CD bonus track)		8:24

== Personnel ==
- Leo Parker – baritone saxophone
- Bill Swindell – tenor saxophone
- John Burks – trumpet
- Yusuf Salim – piano
- Stan Conover – bass
- Purnell Rice – drums
