= Glide On =

Studio album by Bill Jennings with Jack McDuff
- Released: 1960
- Recorded: January 12, 1960
- Studios: Van Gelder Studio, Englewood Cliffs, New Jersey
- Genre: Jazz
- Length: 37:38
- Labels: Prestige; PRLP 7177
- Producer: Esmond Edwards

Bill Jennings chronology
Enough Said! (1959)	Glide On (1960)	Brother Jack (1960)

Glide On is an album by guitarist Bill Jennings with organist Jack McDuff recorded in 1960 and released on the Prestige label.

== Reception ==
Professional ratings
Review scores
Source	Rating
Allmusic	3/5 stars

AllMusic's Richie Unterberger stated "This is a pretty mellow set of bluesy jazz ... Jennings is more of a tasteful player than a fiery one, but he does crank up the heat for some rapid-fire single-note lines". On All About Jazz, Derek Taylor said "Jennings’ may be a forgotten footnote today, but after listening to this disc it's easy to imagine that he had his moment in the limelight shortly after these sessions hit the record shops".

== Track listing ==
1. "Glide On" (Jack Wilson) – 5:32
2. "Alexandria, VA." (Bill Jennings, Sonny Clayton) – 3:52
3. "Billin' and Bluin'" (Bill Jennings, Al Jennings) – 4:42
4. "There'll Never Be Another You" (Harry Warren, Mack Gordon) – 3:50
5. "Azure-Te (Paris Blues)" (Bill Davis, Don Wolf) – 4:40
6. "Fiddlin'" (Bill Jennings, Al Jennings) – 2:34
7. "Cole Slaw" (Jesse Stone) – 8:07
8. "Hey Mrs. Jones" (Robert L. Ragan, Marion Miller) – 4:21

== Personnel ==
- Bill Jennings – guitar
- Jack McDuff – organ, piano
- Al Jennings – vibraphone, guitar
- Wendell Marshall – bass
- Alvin Johnson – drums
