= Bottoms Up (Illinois Jacquet album) =

Studio album by Illinois Jacquet
- Released: 1968
- Recorded: March 26, 1968; New York City
- Genre: Jazz
- Length: 33:46
- Label: Prestige; PR 7575
- Producer: Don Schlitten

Illinois Jacquet chronology
Go Power! (1966)	Bottoms Up (1968)	The King! (1968)

Bottoms Up is an album by jazz saxophonist Illinois Jacquet which was recorded in 1968 and released on the Prestige label.

== Reception ==
Professional ratings
Review scores
Source	Rating
Allmusic	4.5/5 stars
The Rolling Stone Jazz Record Guide	4/5 stars
The Penguin Guide to Jazz Recordings	3/4 stars

Scott Yanow of Allmusic stated, "Even in 1968 when the jazz avant-garde was becoming quite influential, tenor saxophonist Illinois Jacquet played in his own timeless style, performing in an idiom little changed during the previous 20 years".

== Track listing ==
All compositions by Illinois Jacquet except where noted.

1. "Bottoms Up" – 3:21
2. "Port of Rico" – 4:12
3. "You Left Me All Alone" – 3:51
4. "Sassy" (Milt Buckner) – 5:41
5. "Jivin' with Jack the Bellboy" (Bill Doggett, Illinois Jacquet) – 5:40
6. "I Don't Stand a Ghost of a Chance with You" (Bing Crosby, Ned Washington, Victor Young) – 6:12
7. "Our Delight" (Tadd Dameron) – 5:28
8. "Don't Blame Me" (Dorothy Fields, Jimmy McHugh) – 4:09

== Personnel ==
- Illinois Jacquet – tenor saxophone
- Barry Harris – piano
- Ben Tucker – bass
- Alan Dawson – drums
