= Rollin' with Leo =

Studio album by Leo Parker
- Released: 1980
- Recorded: October 12 & 20, 1961
- Studios: Van Gelder Studio, Englewood Cliffs, NJ
- Genre: Jazz
- Length: 43:48
- Labels: Blue Note; LT 1076; BST 84095
- Producer: Alfred Lion

Leo Parker chronology
Let Me Tell You 'Bout It (1961)	Rollin' with Leo (1980)

Rollin' with Leo is the second, and final, album as a leader by American jazz saxophonist Leo Parker, recorded in 1961 but not released on the Blue Note label until 1980.

== Reception ==
The Allmusic review by Steve Leggett awarded the album 4½ stars and calling it "a wonderful portrait of this unsung but brilliant player, whose huge, sad, but almost impossibly strong tone always felt like it carried the world on its shoulders".

Professional ratings
Review scores
Source	Rating
Allmusic	4.5/5 stars
AllAboutJazz	4/5 stars

== Track listing ==
All compositions by Leo Parker except as indicated

1. "The Lion's Roar" - 4:54
2. "Bad Girl" (Conover) - 6:17
3. "Rollin' with Leo" - 6:25
4. "Music Hall Beat" (Illinois Jacquet) - 4:56
5. "Jumpin' Leo" - 4:30
6. "Talkin' the Blues" - 6:30
7. "Stuffy" (Coleman Hawkins) - 5:41
8. "Mad Lad Returns" - 4:35

Recorded on October 12 (tracks 3 & 4) and October 20 (tracks 1, 2 & 5-8), 1961.

== Personnel ==
- Leo Parker - baritone saxophone
- Dave Burns - trumpet
- Bill Swindell - tenor saxophone
- John Acea - piano
- Stan Conover (tracks 3 & 4), Al Lucas (tracks 1, 2 & 5–8) - bass
- Wilbert Hogan (tracks 1, 2 & 5–8), Purnell Rice (tracks 3 & 4) – drums
