= Cool "Gator" =

Studio album by Willis Jackson
- Released: 1960
- Recorded: May 25 and November 9, 1959 and February 26, 1960
- Studio: Van Gelder Studio, Hackensack and Englewood Cliffs, New Jersey
- Genre: Jazz
- Label: Prestige; PR 7172
- Producer: Esmond Edwards

Willis Jackson chronology
Please Mr. Jackson (1959)	Cool "Gator" (1960)	Blue Gator (1960)

Cool "Gator" (also released as Keep on a Blowin') is the second album led by saxophonist Willis Jackson featuring organist Jack McDuff and guitarist Bill Jennings which was recorded in 1959 and 1960 and released on the Prestige label.

== Reception ==
Professional ratings
Review scores
Source	Rating
Allmusic	4.5/5 stars
The Rolling Stone Jazz Record Guide	3/5 stars

Allmusic awarded the album 4½ stars calling it "Enjoyable and accessible music that swings and contains its share of soul".

== Track listing ==
1. "Keep on a' Blowin'" (Willis Jackson, Jack McDuff) – 10:24
2. "How Deep Is the Ocean?" (Irving Berlin) – 4:04
3. "On the Sunny Side of the Street" (Dorothy Fields, Jimmy McHugh) – 3:30
4. "Blue Strollin'" (Jackson) – 7:45
5. "The Man I Love" (George Gershwin, Ira Gershwin) – 7:13
6. "A Smooth One" (Benny Goodman) – 5:24

== Personnel ==
- Willis Jackson – tenor saxophone
- Jack McDuff – organ
- Bill Jennings – guitar
- Milt Hinton (track 1), Wendell Marshall (tracks 3 & 4), Tommy Potter (tracks 2, 5 & 6) – bass
- Alvin Johnson – drums
- Buck Clarke – congas (track 1)
