= Bosses of the Ballad =

Studio album by Illinois Jacquet
- Released: 1964
- Recorded: October 29 & 30, 1964; Regents Sound Studios, New York City
- Genre: Jazz
- Length: 40:41
- Label: Argo; LP-746
- Producer: Esmond Edwards

Illinois Jacquet chronology
Desert Winds (1964)	Bosses of the Ballad (1964)	Spectrum (1965)

Bosses of the Ballad (subtitled Illinois Jacquet and Strings Play Cole Porter) is an album by saxophonist Illinois Jacquet recorded in 1964 and released on the Argo label featuring Cole Porter compositions performed by Jacquet and an orchestra.

== Reception ==
Professional ratings
Review scores
Source	Rating
Allmusic	3/5 stars

Allmusic awarded the album 3 stars.

== Track listing ==
All compositions by Cole Porter

1. "I Love You" - 2:36
2. "Get Out of Town" - 2:35
3. "So in Love" - 3:16
4. "I Concentrate on You" - 4:04
5. "You Do Something to Me" - 3:27
6. "Ev'ry Time We Say Goodbye" - 3:50
7. "Use Your Imagination" - 3:15
8. "All Through the Night" - 3:26
9. "Begin the Beguine" - 3:12
10. "It's All Right with Me" - 3:21
11. "Do I Love You?" - 3:27
12. "I've Got You Under My Skin" - 4:12

== Personnel ==
- Illinois Jacquet - tenor saxophone
- 19-piece orchestra with arrangements by Tom McIntosh and Benny Golson
