= Tommy Potter =

American jazz double bassist (1918–1988)

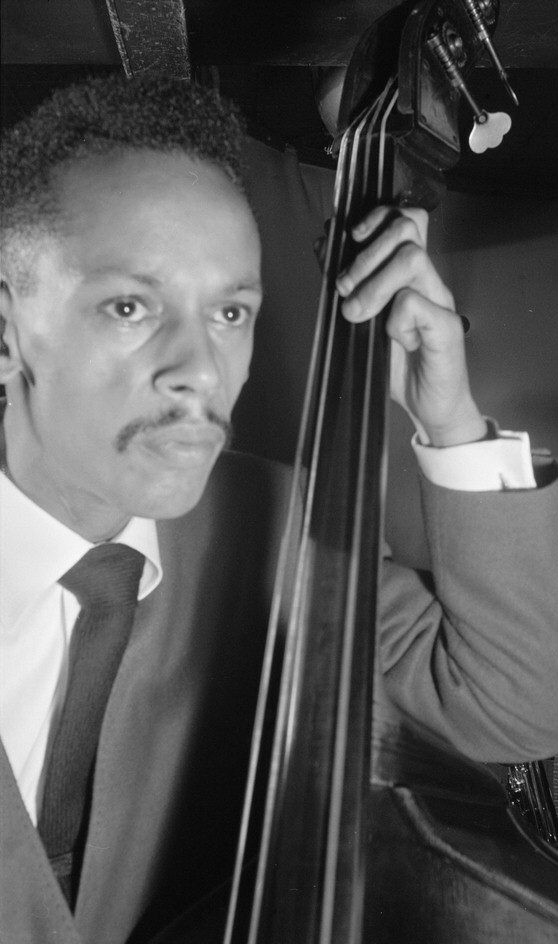
- Potter in 1947

Background information
- Born: Charles Thomas Potter; September 21, 1918; Philadelphia, Pennsylvania, U.S.
- Died: March 1, 1988 (aged 69)
- Genres: Jazz
- Occupation: Musician
- Instrument: Double bass

Charles Thomas Potter (September 21, 1918 – March 1, 1988) was an American jazz double bass player, best known for having been a member of Charlie Parker's "classic quintet", with Miles Davis, between 1947 and 1950.

Born in Philadelphia, Pennsylvania, Potter had first played with Parker in 1944, in Billy Eckstine's band with Dizzy Gillespie, Lucky Thompson and Art Blakey.

Potter also performed and recorded with many other notable jazz musicians, including Count Basie, Buck Clayton, Harry "Sweets" Edison, Stan Getz, Tyree Glenn, Eddie Heywood, Earl Hines, Charles Lloyd, Bud Powell, Max Roach, Sonny Rollins, and Artie Shaw.

== Discography ==
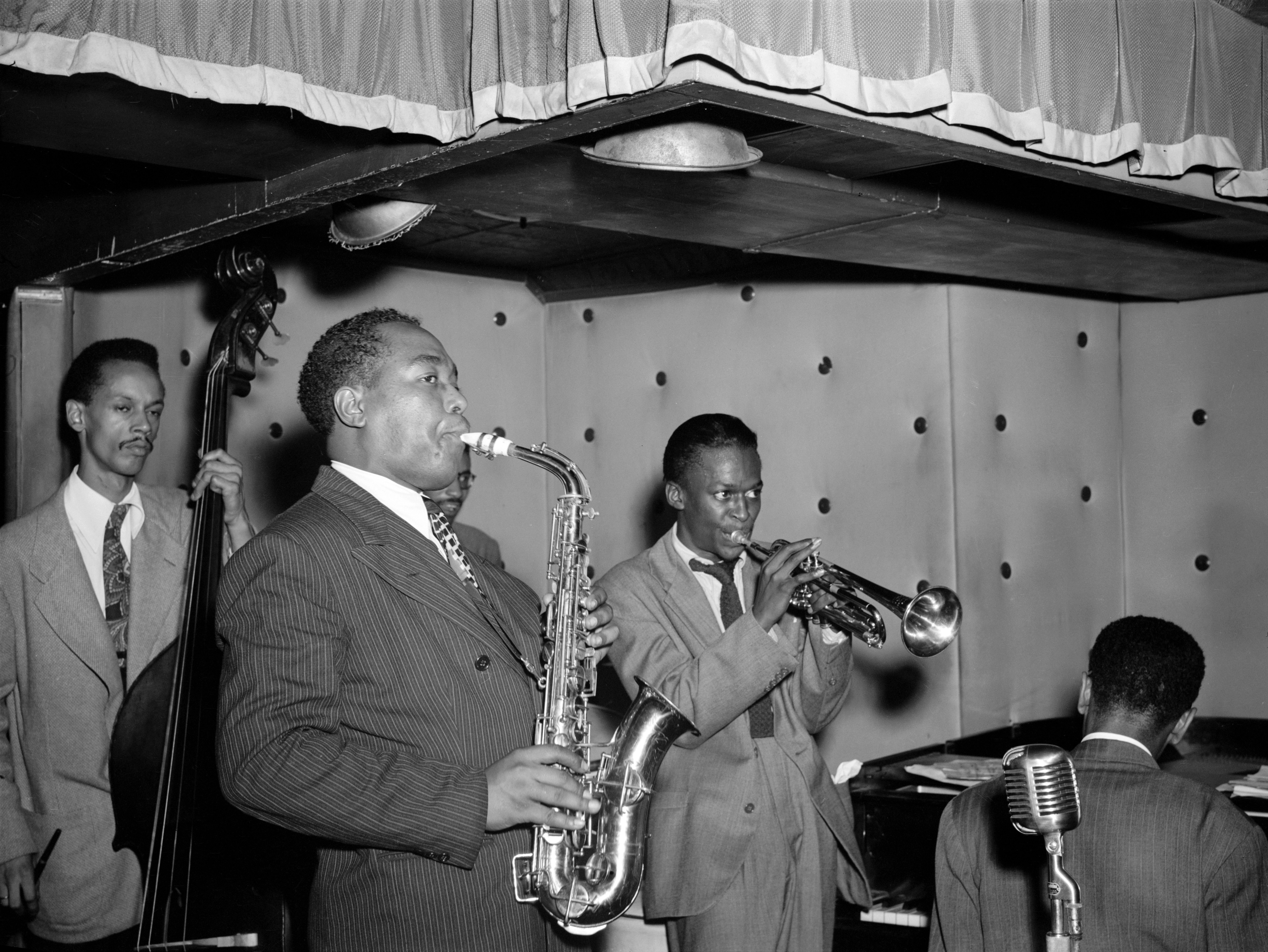
Potter (left) with Charlie Parker, Miles Davis, Duke Jordan, and Max Roach, c. August 1947 Photo: William P. Gottlieb

- Tommy Potter's Hard Funk, (East-West, 1956)

=== As sideman ===
- Thelonious Monk and Sonny Rollins (Prestige, 1956) – with Thelonious Monk, Sonny Rollins and Art Taylor

With Stan Getz

- Stan Getz Quartets (Prestige, 1949–50 [1955])
- The Complete Roost Recordings (Blue Note, 1950–54 [1997])

With Al Cohn

- Al Cohn's Tones (Savoy, 1950 [1956])

With Sonny Stitt

- Kaleidoscope (Prestige, 1950 [1957])
- Stitt's Bits (Prestige, 1950 [1958])
- Stitt in Orbit (Roost, 1962)

With Gene Ammons

- All Star Sessions (Prestige, 1950–55 [1956])

With Artie Shaw

- Artie Shaw & His Gramercy 5 (Clef, 1954) - including Tal Farlow, Hank Jones, Irv Kluger, Joe Roland
- Artie Shaw – The Last Recordings Rare & Unreleased (1992 Re-issue)

With Cecil Payne

- Patterns of Jazz (Savoy, 1956)

With Freddie Redd

- Freddie Redd in Sweden (1956)

With Phil Woods

- Four Altos (Prestige, 1957) – with Gene Quill, Sahib Shihab and Hal Stein

With Willis Jackson

- Please Mr. Jackson (Prestige, 1959)
- Cool "Gator" (Prestige, 1959)
- Blue Gator (Prestige, 1959)
- Together Again! (Prestige, 1959 [1965]) – with Jack McDuff
- Together Again, Again (Prestige, 1959 [1966]) – with Jack McDuff

With Tommy Flanagan

- The Tommy Flanagan Trio (Moodsville, 1960)

With Jo Jones

- Vamp 'til Ready (Everest, 1960)

With Joe Williams

- Together (Roulette, 1961) with Harry "Sweets" Edison

With Jimmy Forrest

- Out of the Forrest (Prestige, 1961)
- Sit Down and Relax with Jimmy Forrest (Prestige, 1961)
- Most Much! (Prestige, 1961)
- Soul Street (New Jazz, 1962)
