= Spectrum (Illinois Jacquet album) =

Studio album by Illinois Jacquet
- Released: 1965
- Recorded: April 29 & 30, 1965; RCA Recording Studio, New York City
- Genre: Jazz
- Label: Argo / Cadet; LP-754
- Producer: Esmond Edwards

Illinois Jacquet chronology
Bosses of the Ballad (1964)	Spectrum (1965)	Go Power! (1966)

Spectrum is an album by saxophonist Illinois Jacquet recorded in 1965 and originally released on the Argo label. The album was one of the last to be released on Argo before Chess Records changed the name to Cadet and subsequently appeared with both labels.

== Reception ==
Professional ratings
Review scores
Source	Rating
Allmusic	3/5 stars

Allmusic awarded the album 3 stars.

== Track listing ==
All compositions by Illinois Jacquet except as indicated

1. "Goin' Out of My Head" (Teddy Randazzo, Bobby Weinstein) - 2:19
2. "Spanish Boots" - 2:57
3. "Elise" - 2:53
4. "I Remember Her So Well" (Erwin Halletz) - 2:52
5. "Now and Then" (Riz Ortolani) - 2:39
6. "Blues for Bunny" (Russell Jacquet) - 5:11
7. "Black Foot" - 3:50
8. "Big Music" - 5:22
9. "Blue Horizon" - 3:10

== Personnel ==
- Illinois Jacquet - tenor saxophone, alto saxophone
- Russell Jacquet (tracks 6–9), James Nottingham (tracks 1–5), Ernie Royal (tracks 1–5) - trumpet
- Buddy Lucas - tenor saxophone (tracks 1–5)
- Haywood Henry - baritone saxophone (tracks 1–5)
- Patricia Bown (track 6–9), Edwin Stoute (track 1–5) - piano
- Billy Butler, Eric Gale - guitar (track 1–5)
- George Duvivier (track 6–9), Leonard Gaskin (track 1–5) - bass
- Herbie Lovelle (tracks 1–5), Grady Tate (tracks 6–9) - drums
- Candido - conga (tracks 6–9)
- Bert Keyes - arranger, conductor (tracks 1–5)
