= The Blues; That's Me! =

Studio album by Illinois Jacquet
- Released: 1969
- Recorded: September 16, 1969
- Studio: Van Gelder Studio, Englewood Cliffs, New Jersey
- Genre: Jazz
- Length: 41:13
- Label: Prestige; PR 7731
- Producer: Don Schlitten

Illinois Jacquet chronology
The Soul Explosion (1969)	The Blues; That's Me! (1969)	Genius at Work (1971)

The Blues; That's Me! is an album by jazz saxophonist Illinois Jacquet which was recorded in 1969, and released on the Prestige label.

== Reception ==
Professional ratings
Review scores
Source	Rating
Allmusic	5/5 stars
The Rolling Stone Jazz Record Guide	3/5 stars
The Penguin Guide to Jazz Recordings	3/4 stars

Scott Yanow of Allmusic stated, "Tenor saxophonist Illinois Jacquet is heard in top form throughout this quintet set... The music, which falls between swing, bop and early R&B, is generally quite exciting... highly recommended".

== Track listing ==
All compositions by Illinois Jacquet except where noted.

1. "The Blues; That's Me!" (Tiny Grimes) – 10:28
2. "Still King" (Frank Foster, Illinois Jacquet) – 3:52
3. "'Round Midnight" (Thelonious Monk) – 6:53
4. "The Galloping Latin" – 5:28
5. "For Once in My Life" (Ron Miller, Orlando Murden) – 7:02
6. "Every Day I Have the Blues" (Peter Chatman) – 6:25

== Personnel ==
- Illinois Jacquet – tenor saxophone, bassoon
- Wynton Kelly – piano
- Tiny Grimes – guitar
- Buster Williams – bass
- Oliver Jackson – drums
