= Together Again! =

Studio album by Willis Jackson and Jack McDuff
- Released: 1965
- Recorded: May 25 and November 9, 1959; February 26 and August 16, 1960
- Studio: Van Gelder Studio, Hackensack and Englewood Cliffs, New Jersey
- Genre: Jazz
- Label: Prestige; PR 7364
- Producer: Esmond Edwards

Willis Jackson chronology
Cookin' Sherry (1959–60)	Together Again! (1965)	Really Groovin' (1961)

Together Again! is an album by saxophonist Willis Jackson with organist Jack McDuff which was recorded in 1959 and 1960 and released on the Prestige label in 1965.

== Reception ==
Professional ratings
Review scores
Source	Rating
AllMusic	4/5 stars
The Rolling Stone Jazz Record Guide	3/5 stars

AllMusic reviewer Richie Unterberger stated: "the Willis Jackson-Jack McDuff-speared combo offers respectable early soul-jazz, if not too different from many other Prestige-overseen sessions of the early '60s".

== Track listing ==
All compositions by Willis Jackson, except where noted.

1. "Three Little Words" (Bert Kalmar, Harry Ruby) – 5:01
2. "Tu'gether" – 7:10
3. "Glad'a See Ya" – 4:12
4. "This'll Get to Ya" – 10:14
5. "It Might as Well Be Spring" (Oscar Hammerstein II, Richard Rodgers) – 6:58
- Recorded at Van Gelder Studio in Hackensack, New Jersey on May 25, 1959 (track 1), and at Van Gelder Studio in Englewood Cliffs, New Jersey on November 9, 1959 (track 3), February 26, 1960 (tracks 4, 5) and August 16, 1960 (track 2)

== Personnel ==
- Willis Jackson – tenor saxophone
- Jack McDuff – organ
- Bill Jennings – guitar
- Milt Hinton (tracks 4, 5), Wendell Marshall (tracks 2, 3), Tommy Potter (track 1) – bass
- Bill Elliot (track 2), Alvin Johnson (tracks 1, 3–5) – drums
- Buck Clarke – congas (tracks 4, 5)
