= Go Power! =

Live album by Illinois Jacquet
- Released: 1966
- Recorded: March 1966; Lennie's On the Turnpike, West Peabody, Massachusetts
- Genre: Jazz
- Label: Cadet; LP-773
- Producer: Esmond Edwards

Illinois Jacquet chronology
| Spectrum (1965) | Go Power! (1966) | Bottoms Up (1968) |

Go Power! is a live album by saxophonist Illinois Jacquet recorded in Massachusetts in 1966 and released on the Cadet label.

== Reception ==
Professional ratings
Review scores
| Source | Rating |
|---|---|
| Allmusic | 3/5 stars |

Allmusic awarded the album 3 stars stating "Buckner's heavy organ sound takes a bit of getting used to (this set would have been much better if he had been on piano) but he does push Jacquet to some fiery playing".

== Track listing ==
All compositions by Illinois Jacquet except as indicated

1. "On a Clear Day (You Can See Forever)" (Burton Lane, Alan Jay Lerner) - 7:54
2. "Illinois Jacquet Flies Again" - 6:52
3. "Robbins' Nest" (Illinois Jacquet, Sir Charles Thompson) - 5:00
4. "Watermelon Man" (Herbie Hancock) - 5:42
5. "I Want a Little Girl" (Murray Mencher, Billy Moll) - 6:09
6. "Pamela's Blues" - 5:06
7. "Jan" (Norman Simmons) - 5:15

== Personnel ==
- Illinois Jacquet - tenor saxophone
- Milt Buckner - organ
- Alan Dawson - drums
