= Ted Buckner =

American jazz saxophonist

Theodore Guy Buckner (December 14, 1913, St. Louis, Missouri - April 12, 1976, Detroit, Michigan) was an American jazz saxophonist, clarinetist and flutist. He was the brother of Milt Buckner.

Buckner was raised in Detroit, where he played very early in his career before joining McKinney's Cotton Pickers. He was best known for his time spent in the orchestra of Jimmie Lunceford, where he remained from 1937 to 1943. After working with Lunceford, Buckner primarily played locally in Detroit, where he worked into the 1970s. His activities included small jazz combos, work in the Motown studios, and co-leading a big band with Jimmy Wilkins, Ernie Wilkins's brother. He toured Europe in 1975, and also appeared in the New McKinney's Cotton Pickers that decade.
