= The Soul Explosion =

Studio album by Illinois Jacquet
- Released: 1968
- Recorded: March 25, 1969
- Studio: Van Gelder Studio, Englewood Cliffs, New Jersey
- Genre: Jazz
- Length: 36:23
- Label: Prestige; PR 7629
- Producer: Don Schlitten

Illinois Jacquet chronology
The King! (1968)	The Soul Explosion (1968)	The Blues; That's Me! (1969)

The Soul Explosion is an album by jazz saxophonist Illinois Jacquet which was recorded in 1969 and released on the Prestige label.

== Reception ==
Professional ratings
Review scores
Source	Rating
Allmusic	4.5/5 stars
The Rolling Stone Jazz Record Guide	3/5 stars
The Penguin Guide to Jazz Recordings	3/4 stars

Scott Yanow of Allmusic stated, "This blues-based set is full of soul but often swings quite hard with the focus on Jacquet's exciting tenor throughout".

== Track listing ==
1. "The Soul Explosion" (Gladys Bruce) – 9:17
2. "After Hours" (Mark Gordon, Erskine Hawkins, Avery Parrish) – 7:30
3. "St. Louis Blues" (W. C. Handy) – 3:06
4. "I'm a Fool to Want You" (Joel Herron, Frank Sinatra, Jack Wolf) – 8:53
5. "The Eighteenth Hole" (Bruce) – 3:30
6. "Still King" (Frank Foster, Illinois Jacquet) – 4:07 Bonus track on CD reissue

== Personnel ==
- Illinois Jacquet – tenor saxophone
- Russell Jacquet, Joe Newman, Ernie Royal – trumpet
- Matthew Gee – trombone
- Frank Foster – tenor saxophone
- Cecil Payne – baritone saxophone
- Milt Buckner – organ, piano, arranger
- Wally Richardson – guitar
- Al Lucas – bass, electric bass
- Al Foster – drums
- Jimmy Mundy – arranger
