= In My Solitude (Willis Jackson album) =

Studio album by Willis Jackson
- Released: 1961
- Recorded: January 10 & April 11, 1961
- Studio: Van Gelder Studio, Englewood Cliffs, New Jersey
- Genre: Jazz
- Label: Moodsville; MVLP 17
- Producer: Esmond Edwards

Willis Jackson chronology
Really Groovin' (1961)	In My Solitude (1961)	Together Again, Again (1959-61)

Professional ratings
Review scores
Source	Rating
Allmusic	3/5 stars

In My Solitude is an album by saxophonist Willis Jackson which was recorded in 1961 and released on the Moodsville label.

== Track listing ==
1. "Nobody Knows the Trouble I've Seen" (Traditional) – 4:13
2. "Sometimes I Feel Like a Motherless Child" (Traditional) – 3:44
3. "(In My) Solitude" (Eddie DeLange, Duke Ellington, Irving Mills) – 5:03
4. "Estrellita" (Manuel Ponce) – 4:10
5. "It Never Entered My Mind" (Lorenz Hart, Richard Rodgers) – 4:02
6. "They Didn't Believe Me" (Jerome Kern, Michael E. Rourke) – 3:38
7. "Home" (Harry Clarkson, Geoffrey Clarkson, Peter van Steeden) – 5:10
8. "Nancy (With The Laughing Face)" (Jimmy van Heusen/Phil Silvers) – 5:26
- Recorded at Van Gelder Studio in Englewood Cliffs, New Jersey on January 10, 1961 (track 4), and April 11, 1961 (tracks 1–3 & 5–7)

== Personnel ==
- Willis Jackson – tenor saxophone
- Jimmy Neeley (track 4), Richard Wyands (tracks 1–3 & 5–8) – piano
- Wendell Marshall (track 4), Peck Morrison (tracks 1–3 & 5–8) – bass
- Gus Johnson (track 4), Mickey Roker (tracks 1–3 & 5–8) – drums
- Juan Amalbert – congas (track 4)
