= Really Groovin' =

Studio album by Willis Jackson
- Released: 1961
- Recorded: January 10 & April 11, 1961
- Studio: Van Gelder Studio, Englewood Cliffs, New Jersey
- Genre: Jazz
- Label: Prestige; PRLP 7196
- Producer: Esmond Edwards

Willis Jackson chronology
Together Again! (1959-60)	Really Groovin' (1961)	In My Solitude (1961)

Really Groovin' is an album by saxophonist Willis Jackson which was recorded in 1961 and released on the Prestige label.

== Reception ==
Professional ratings
Review scores
Source	Rating
Allmusic	3/5 stars

Allmusic awarded the album 3 stars stating "A fine, soulful jazz date, mostly slow blues and ballads, from one of the kings of honky-tonk saxophone. Jackson's smooth, Ben Webster-ish tenor playing is seldom surprising, but always satisfying".

== Track listing ==
All compositions by Willis Jackson except where noted.

1. "Careless Love" (W. C. Handy, Spencer Williams) – 4:13
2. "Oatmeal" (Johnny Griffin) – 4:25
3. "I Remember Clifford" (Benny Golson) – 3:48
4. "A Twist of Blues" – 5:40
5. "Sweet Peter Charleston" (Griffin) – 6:51
6. "Again" (Lionel Newman, Dorcas Cochran) – 4:05
7. "He Said, She Said, I Said" – 3:52
8. "Girl Of My Dreams" (Sunny Clapp) – 6:40
- Recorded at Van Gelder Studio in Englewood Cliffs, New Jersey on January 10, 1961 (tracks 1–7), and April 11, 1961 (track 8)

== Personnel ==
- Willis Jackson – tenor saxophone
- Jimmy Neeley (tracks 1–7), Richard Wyands (track 8) – piano
- Wendell Marshall (tracks 1–7), Peck Morrison (track 8) – bass
- Gus Johnson (tracks 1–7), Mickey Roker (track 8) – drums
- Juan Amalbert – congas (tracks 1–7)
