= Please Mr. Jackson =

Studio album by Willis Jackson
- Released: 1959
- Recorded: May 25, 1959
- Studio: Van Gelder Studio, Hackensack, New Jersey
- Genre: Jazz
- Length: 34:02
- Label: Prestige; PR 7162
- Producer: Esmond Edwards

Willis Jackson chronology
Please Mr. Jackson (1959)	Cool "Gator" (1959-60)

Please Mr. Jackson is the debut album by saxophonist Willis Jackson. It featured organist Jack McDuff and guitarist Bill Jennings, and was recorded and released 1959 on the Prestige label.

== Reception ==
Professional ratings
Review scores
Source	Rating
AllMusic	4/5 stars
The Penguin Guide to Jazz Recordings	3/4 stars

AllMusic reviewer Scott Yanow stated: "In 1959, starting with this Prestige set Jackson made his mark on soul-jazz."

== Track listing ==
All compositions by Willis Jackson, Bill Jennings and Jack McDuff' except where indicated.

1. "Cool Grits" – 8:32
2. "Come Back to Sorrento" (Ernesto De Curtis) – 4:30
3. "Dinky's Mood" (Jackson, McDuff) – 3:55
4. "Please Mr. Jackson" – 5:44
5. "633 Knock" (Jennings) – 5:18
6. "Memories of You" (Eubie Blake, Andy Razaf) – 6:03

== Personnel ==
- Willis Jackson – tenor saxophone
- Jack McDuff – organ
- Bill Jennings – guitar
- Tommy Potter – bass
- Alvin Johnson – drums
