= Blue Gator =

Studio album by Willis Jackson
- Released: 1960
- Recorded: May 25, November 9, 1959; February 26 and August 16, 1960
- Studio: Van Gelder Studio, Hackensack and Englewood Cliffs, New Jersey
- Genre: Jazz
- Label: Prestige; PR 7183
- Producer: Esmond Edwards

Willis Jackson chronology
Cool "Gator" (1961)	Blue Gator (1960)	Cookin' Sherry (1960)

Professional ratings
Review scores
Source	Rating
AllMusic	3/5 stars
The Rolling Stone Jazz Record Guide	3/5 stars

Blue Gator is the third album led by saxophonist Willis Jackson featuring organist Jack McDuff and guitarist Bill Jennings which was recorded in 1959 and 1960 and released on the Prestige label.

== Track listing ==
All compositions by Willis Jackson except where noted.

1. "Blue Gator" – 9:12
2. "Try a Little Tenderness" (Jimmy Campbell, Reg Connelly, Harry Woods) – 5:57
3. "Gator's Tail" – 3:39
4. "This Nearly Was Mine" (Oscar Hammerstein II, Richard Rodgers) – 4:31
5. "East Breeze" (Esmond Edwards) – 10:01
6. "She's Funny That Way" (Neil Moret, Richard Whiting) – 5:10

Note

- Recorded at Van Gelder Studio in Hackensack, New Jersey on May 25, 1959 (tracks 3 & 6), and at Van Gelder Studio in Englewood Cliffs, New Jersey on November 9, 1959 (track 5), February 26, 1960 (track 4) and August 16, 1960 (tracks 1 & 2)

== Personnel ==
- Willis Jackson – tenor saxophone
- Jack McDuff – organ
- Bill Jennings – guitar
- Milt Hinton (track 4), Wendell Marshall (tracks 1, 2 & 5), Tommy Potter (tracks 3 & 6) – bass
- Bill Elliot (tracks 1 & 2), Alvin Johnson (tracks 3–6) – drums
- Buck Clarke – congas (track 4)
