= Enough Said! =

Studio album by Bill Jennings
- Released: 1959
- Recorded: August 21, 1959
- Studios: Van Gelder Studio, Englewood Cliffs, New Jersey
- Genre: Jazz
- Labels: Prestige; PRLP 7164
- Producer: Esmond Edwards

Bill Jennings chronology
Billy in the Lion's Den (1957)	Enough Said! (1959)	Glide On (1960)

Enough Said! is an album by guitarist Bill Jennings, which was recorded in 1959 and released on the Prestige label.

== Reception ==
Professional ratings
Review scores
Source	Rating
Allmusic	3/5 stars
DownBeat	3/5 stars

AllMusic's Richie Unterberger stated "Jennings shows off the bluesy tone that made him a favorite of B.B. King on his composition "Tough Gain" and the group-penned "Blue Jams", but aside from these, most of the tracks are slow-to-midtempo shuffles—edifying yet not exciting. On "Dark Eyes", Jennings varies the pace in a more arresting fashion than usual, playing sleepy lines with a crying tone to achieve a near slide-effect before the tempo abruptly doubles and the tune drops into a bop groove in its last half". On All About Jazz, Derek Taylor said "Jennings’ may be a forgotten footnote today, but after listening to this disc it’s easy to imagine that he had his moment in the limelight shortly after these sessions hit the record shops".

== Track listing ==
1. "Enough Said" (Alvin Johnson) – 6:40
2. "Tough Gain" (Bill Jennings) – 4:15
3. "Volare" (Franco Migliacci, Domenico Modugno) 7:00
4. "Dark Eyes" (Adalgiso Ferraris) – 4:39
5. "It Could Happen to You" (Jimmy Van Heusen, Johnny Burke) – 6:24
6. "Blue Jams" (Bill Jennings, Jack McDuff) – 5:26
7. "Dig Uncle Will" (McDuff) – 3:28

== Personnel ==
- Bill Jennings – guitar
- Jack McDuff – organ, piano
- Wendell Marshall – bass
- Alvin Johnson – drums
