= Desert Winds =

Studio album by Illinois Jacquet with Kenny Burrell
- Released: 1964
- Recorded: February 13, 1964
- Studio: Van Gelder Studio, Englewood Cliffs, New Jersey
- Genre: Jazz
- Length: 34:59
- Label: Argo; LP-735
- Producer: Esmond Edwards

Illinois Jacquet chronology
The Message (1963)	Desert Winds (1964)	Bosses of the Ballad (1964)

Desert Winds is an album by saxophonist Illinois Jacquet with guitarist Kenny Burrell recorded in 1964 and released on the Argo label.

== Reception ==
Professional ratings
Review scores
Source	Rating
AllMusic	3.5/5 stars
The Penguin Guide to Jazz Recordings	3/4 stars

AllMusic awarded the album 3½ stars, stating, "An underappreciated and unassuming album, Desert Winds has plenty of easy charm, and while there are no barn-burning solos here, there are plenty of moments of quiet and lyrical joy".

== Track listing ==
1. "When My Dreamboat Comes Home" (Cliff Friend, Dave Franklin) – 5:20
2. "Desert Winds" (Esmond Edwards) – 4:15
3. "Star Eyes" (Gene de Paul, Don Raye) – 4:15
4. "Blues for the Early Bird" (Illinois Jacquet) – 3:10
5. "Lester Leaps In" (Lester Young) – 7:15
6. "You're My Thrill" (Jay Gorney, Sidney Clare) – 3:45
7. "Canadian Sunset" (Eddie Heywood, Norman Gimbel) – 6:10

== Personnel ==
- Illinois Jacquet – tenor saxophone, alto saxophone
- Kenny Burrell – electric guitar
- Tommy Flanagan – piano
- Wendell Marshall – double bass
- Ray Lucas – drums
- Willie Rodriguez – congas
