= Red Prysock =

American R&B saxophonist (1926–1993)

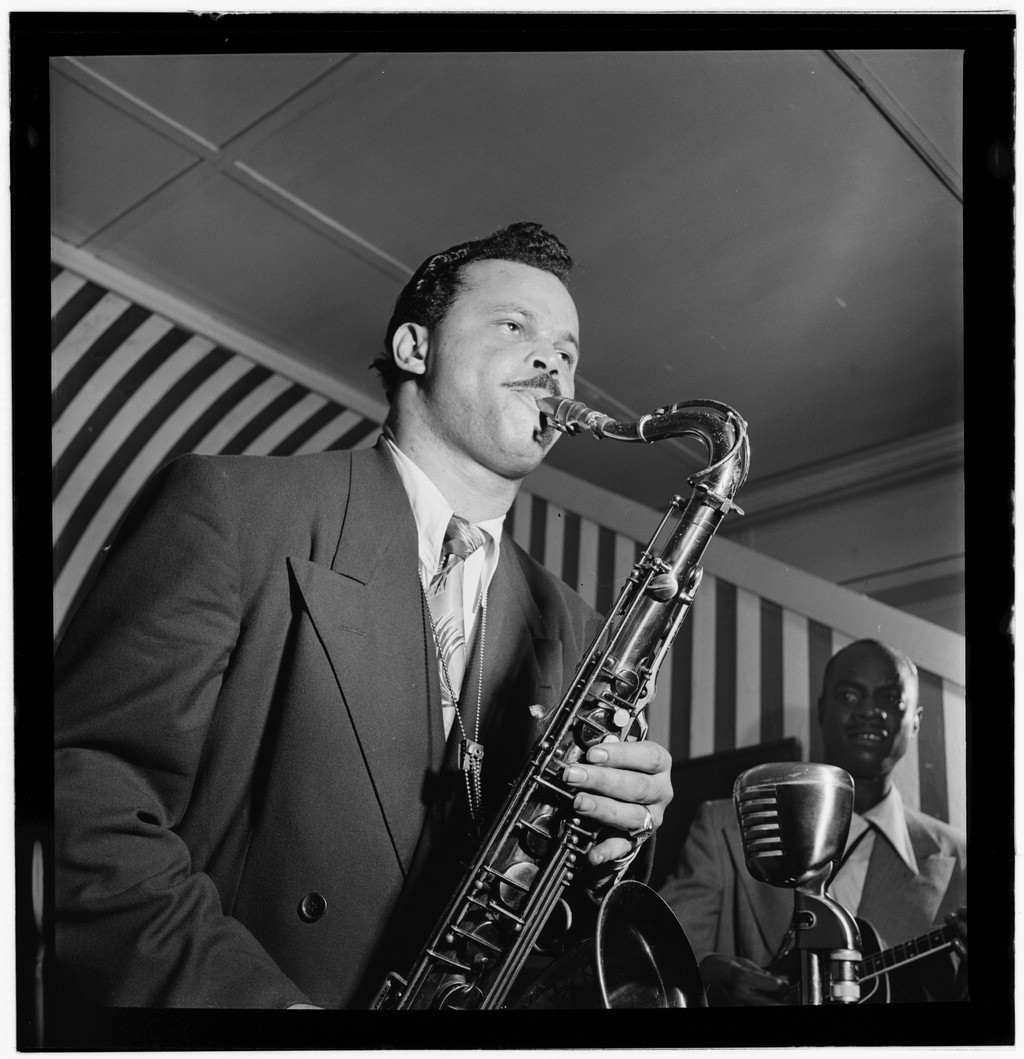
- Red Prysock (foreground) playing with Tiny Grimes, c. 1947

Background information
- Born: Wilburt Prysock; February 2, 1926; Greensboro, North Carolina, U.S.
- Died: July 19, 1993 (aged 67) Chicago, Illinois, U.S.
- Genres: R&B
- Occupation: Musician
- Instrument: Tenor saxophone
- Years active: 1950s–1960s
- Label: Mercury

Wilburt "Red" Prysock (February 2, 1926 – July 19, 1993) was an American R&B tenor saxophonist, one of the early Coleman Hawkins-influenced saxophonists to move in the direction of rhythm and blues, rather than bebop.

== Career ==
With Tiny Grimes and his Rocking Highlanders, Prysock staged a saxophone battle with Benny Golson on "Battle of the Mass". He first gained attention as a member of Tiny Bradshaw's band, playing the lead saxophone solo on his own "Soft", which was a hit for the Bradshaw band in 1952. Prysock also played with Roy Milton and Cootie Williams.

In 1954, he signed with Mercury Records as a bandleader and had his biggest hit, the instrumental "Hand Clappin'" in 1955. During the same year, he joined the band that played at Alan Freed's stage shows. He also performed on several hit records by his brother, singer Arthur Prysock, in the 1960s.

== Personal life ==
Prysock was born in 1926 in Greensboro, North Carolina, United States, and died of a heart attack in 1993 in Chicago, at the age of 67. He served in the United States Army during World War II, which was when he learned to play saxophone. He was buried at the Salisbury National Cemetery in Salisbury, North Carolina.

== Discography ==
- Rock and Roll (Mercury, 1956)
- Fruit Boots (Mercury, 1957)
- The Beat (Mercury, 1957)
- Swing Softly Red (Mercury, 1958)
- Battle Royal with Sil Austin (Mercury, 1959)
- The Big Sound of Red Prysock (Forum Circle, 1964)
- For Me and My Baby (Gateway, 1964; reissued on CD in 2003)
