= Leo Parker =

American jazz musician (1925–1962)

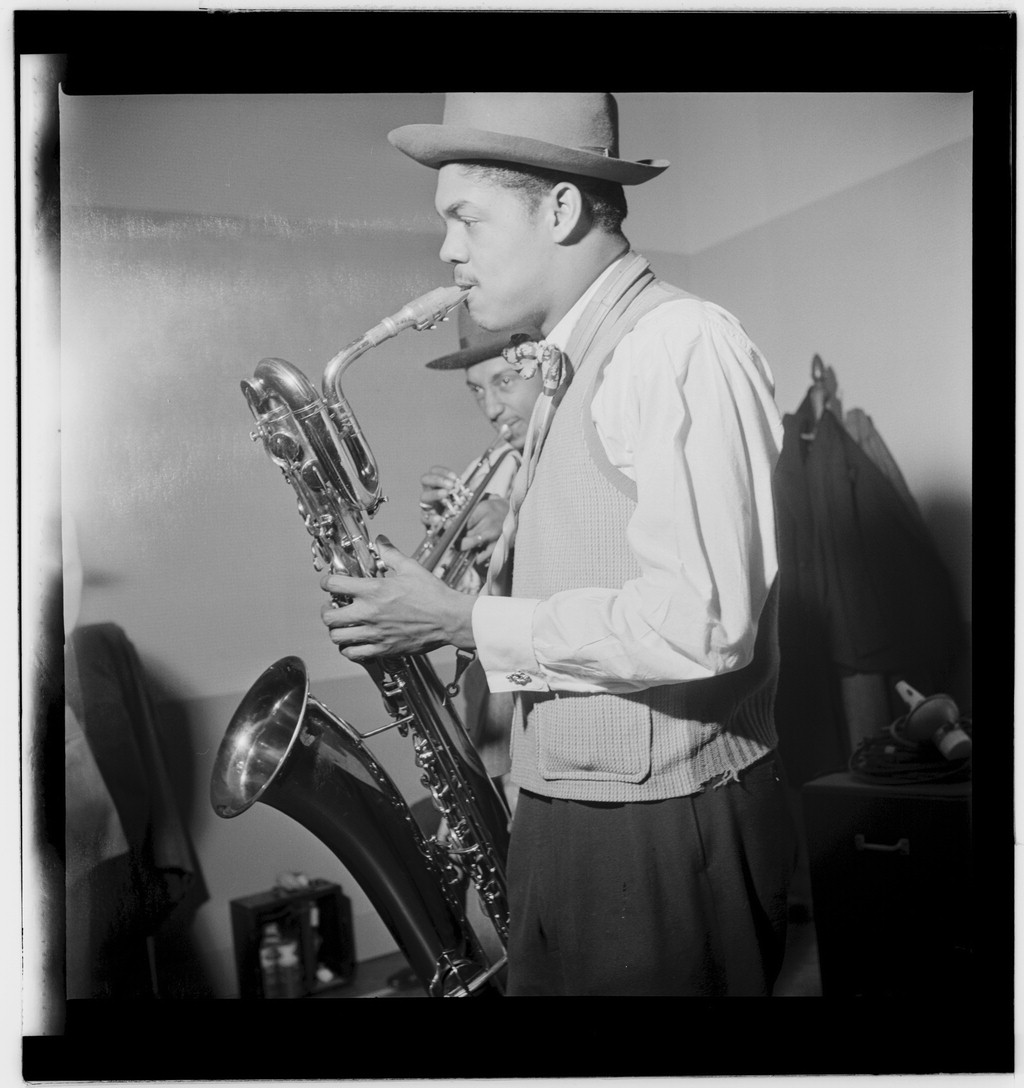

Background information
- Born: April 18, 1925; Washington, D.C., U.S.
- Died: February 11, 1962 (aged 36) New York City, New York, U.S.
- Genres: Jazz
- Instruments: Baritone saxophone

Leo Parker (April 18, 1925 – February 11, 1962) was an American jazz musician, who primarily played baritone saxophone. Parker was the earliest baritone saxophonist to play bebop.

== Early life ==
Born in Washington, D.C., Parker studied alto saxophone in high school and played this instrument on a recording with Coleman Hawkins in 1944.

== Career ==
Parker switched to baritone saxophone in 1944 when he joined Billy Eckstine's bebop band, playing there until 1946. In 1945, he was a member of the "Unholy Four" of saxophonists, with Dexter Gordon, Sonny Stitt and Gene Ammons. He played on 52nd Street in New York with Dizzy Gillespie in 1946 and Illinois Jacquet in 1947-48, and later recorded with Fats Navarro, J.J. Johnson, Teddy Edwards, Wardell Gray and Charles Thompson. He and Thompson had a hit with their Apollo Records release, "Mad Lad".

== Personal life ==
In the 1950s, Parker had problems with drug abuse, which interfered with his recording career. He made two comeback records for Blue Note in 1961, but the following year he died of a heart attack in New York City. He was 36.

== Discography ==
As leader or co-leader

- Billy in the Lion's Den (King, 1957) with Bill Jennings
- Let Me Tell You 'Bout It (Blue Note, 1961)
- Rollin' with Leo (Blue Note, 1961)
- The Late Great King of the Baritone Sax (Chess, 1971)

With Coleman Hawkins

- Rainbow Mist (Delmark, 1944 [1992]) compilation of Apollo recordings

With Illinois Jacquet

- The Kid and the Brute (Clef, 1955)
- Illinois Jacquet / Leo Parker -- Toronto 1947 (Uptown Records, 2013)
- Jumpin' at Apollo (Delmark, 2002)

With Dexter Gordon

- Dexter Rides Again (Savoy, 1945–1947 [1958])
