= Together Again, Again =

Studio album by Willis Jackson and Brother Jack McDuff
- Released: 1966
- Recorded: May 25 and November 9, 1959, February 26, 1960 and December 13, 1961
- Studio: Van Gelder Studio, Hackensack and Englewood Cliffs, New Jersey
- Genre: Jazz
- Label: Prestige; PR 7428
- Producer: Esmond Edwards

Willis Jackson chronology
| In My Solitude (1961) | Together Again, Again (1966) | Thunderbird (1962) |

Together Again, Again is an album by saxophonist Willis Jackson with organist Brother Jack McDuff which was recorded in 1959, 1960 and 1961 and released on the Prestige label in 1966.

== Reception ==
Professional ratings
Review scores
| Source | Rating |
|---|---|
| AllMusic | 4.5/5 stars |

AllMusic awarded the album 4½ stars stating "Tenor saxophonist Jackson and organist McDuff might be the spotlighted performers in the marketing, but actually it's a pretty integrated full-band, small-group sound. There's not much original material from Jackson, though (and no original tunes from McDuff), with a New Orleans-tinged version of Hank Williams' "Jambalaya" the most unexpected cover choice".

== Track listing ==
All compositions by Willis Jackson except where noted.

1. "Gil's Pills" (John Adriano Acea) – 4:10
2. "Backtrack" – 2:05
3. "Without a Song" (Vincent Youmans, Billy Rose, Edward Eliscu) – 3:0
4. "Snake Crawl" – 2:40
5. "Angel Eyes" (Matt Dennis, Earl Brent) – 4:40
6. "Dancing on the Ceiling" (Lorenz Hart, Richard Rodgers) – 4:12
7. "Medley: September Song/Easy Living/Deep Purple" (Kurt Weill, Maxwell Anderson/Ralph Rainger, Leo Robin/Peter DeRose) – 7:39
8. "Jambalaya" (Hank Williams) – 4:50
- Recorded at Van Gelder Studio in Hackensack, New Jersey on May 25, 1959 (tracks 1 & 5), and at Van Gelder Studio in Englewood Cliffs, New Jersey on November 9, 1959 (track 7), February 26, 1960 (track 6) and December 13, 1961 (track 2–4 & 8)

== Personnel ==
- Willis Jackson – tenor saxophone
- Jack McDuff – organ
- Bill Jennings – guitar
- Milt Hinton (track 6), Jimmy Lewis (tracks 2–4 & 8), Wendell Marshall (track 7), Tommy Potter (tracks 1 & 5) – bass
- Alvin Johnson (tracks 1 & 5–7), Frank Shea (tracks 2–4 & 8) – drums
- Buck Clarke – congas (track 6)
