= The King! =

Studio album by Illinois Jacquet
- Released: 1968
- Recorded: August 20, 1968; New York City
- Genre: Jazz
- Length: 41:13
- Label: Prestige; PR 7597
- Producer: Don Schlitten

Illinois Jacquet chronology
Bottoms Up (1968)	The King! (1968)	The Soul Explosion (1969)

The King! is an album by jazz saxophonist Illinois Jacquet which was recorded in 1968 and released on the Prestige label.

== Reception ==
Professional ratings
Review scores
Source	Rating
Allmusic	3/5 stars
The Rolling Stone Jazz Record Guide	3/5 stars
The Penguin Guide to Jazz Recordings	3/4 stars

Scott Yanow of Allmusic stated, "Tenor saxophonist Illinois Jacquet has never made an indifferent record, and this CD reissue of a Prestige date from 1968 has its strong moments. ... Enjoyable music but not all that essential".

== Track listing ==
All compositions by Illinois Jacquet except as indicated

1. "A Haunting Melody" – 5:20
2. "I Wish I Knew (How It Would Feel to Be Free)" (Billy Taylor) – 6:40
3. "The King" (Count Basie) – 5:34
4. "Caravan" (Duke Ellington, Irving Mills, Juan Tizol) – 3:28
5. "Blue and Sentimental" (Basie, Mack David, Jerry Livingston) – 6:30
6. "How High the Moon" (Nancy Hamilton, Morgan Lewis) – 5:29
7. "A Haunting Melody" [alternate take] – 2:55 Bonus track on CD reissue
8. "Blue and Sentimental" [alternate take] (Basie, David, Livingston) – 5:17 Bonus track on CD reissue

== Personnel ==
- Illinois Jacquet – tenor saxophone, bassoon
- Joe Newman – trumpet
- Milt Buckner – organ, piano
- Billy Butler – guitar
- Al Lucas – bass, tuba
- Jo Jones – drums
- Montego Joe – congas, bongos
