= The Kid and the Brute =

Studio album by Illinois Jacquet and Ben Webster
- Released: 1955
- Recorded: December 13, 1954; New York City
- Genre: Jazz
- Label: Clef; MGC 680
- Producer: Norman Granz

Illinois Jacquet chronology
| Groovin' with Jacquet (1954) | The Kid and the Brute (1955) | Swings the Thing (1955) |

Ben Webster chronology
| Ballads by Ben Webster (1954) | The Kid and the Brute (1954) | Ben Webster Plays Music with Feeling (1955) |

The Kid and the Brute is an album by American jazz saxophonists Illinois Jacquet and Ben Webster recorded in late 1954 and released on the Clef label.

== Reception ==
Professional ratings
Review scores
| Source | Rating |
|---|---|
| Allmusic | 4/5 stars |

Allmusic reviewer Scott Yanow described the album as "An excellent example of Illinois Jacquet's hard-swinging and accessible music". in JazzTimes, Stanley Dance observed: "The two long blues on which Ben Webster plays are by far the most exciting tracks. Opening the record on the first, he lays down a ferocious challenge, but Jacquet, who in no way appears intimidated by the huffing and puffing, replies in an alert, sparring fashion that contrasts his leaner sound effectively. Jacquet opens on the second, their subsequent exchanges having rare, toe-to-toe intensity, as befits two of the swingingest tenors there have ever been".

== Track listing ==
All compositions by Illinois Jacquet except as indicated

1. "I Wrote This for the Kid" - 11:53
2. "Saph" (Jacquet, Johnny Acea) - 2:42
3. "Mambocito Mio" (Jacquet, Osie Johnson) - 2:51
4. "The Kid and the Brute" - 8:26
5. "September Song" (Kurt Weill, Maxwell Anderson) - 4:31
6. "Jacquet's Dilemma" (Jacquet, Acea) - 3:09

== Personnel ==
- Illinois Jacquet - tenor saxophone
- Ben Webster - tenor saxophone (tracks 1 & 4)
- Russell Jacquet - trumpet (tracks 2, 3, 5 & 6)
- Matthew Gee - trombone (tracks 2, 3, 5 & 6)
- Leo Parker - baritone saxophone (tracks 2, 3, 5 & 6)
- Johnny Acea - piano
- Al Lucas - bass
- Osie Johnson - drums
- Chano Pozo - congas (tracks 3 & 4)
