= Billy in the Lion's Den =

Studio album by Bill Jennings-Leo Parker Quintet
- Released: March 1957
- Recorded: July 6 & 7, 1954
- Studio: Cincinnati, OH
- Genre: Jazz
- Length: 33:58
- Label: King; 395–527
- Producer: Syd Nathan

Bill Jennings chronology
Mood Indigo (1956)	Billy in the Lion's Den (1957)	Enough Said! (1960)

Leo Parker chronology
Billy in the Lion's Den (1957)	Let Me Tell You 'Bout It (1961)

Billy in the Lion's Den is an album by guitarist Bill Jennings and saxophonist Leo Parker recorded in Cincinnati in 1954 and released on the King label.

Professional ratings
Review scores
Source	Rating
Allmusic	4.5/5 stars

== Track listing ==
All compositions by Bill Jennings and Leo Parker except where noted

1. "Piccadilly Circus" (Bill Davis) – 2:01
2. "May I?" (Harry Revel, Mack Gordon) – 2:53
3. "Billy in the Lion's Den" – 2:54
4. "Sweet and Lovely" (Gus Arnheim, Charles N. Daniels, Harry Tobias) – 3:35
5. "There Will Never Be Another You" (Harry Warren, Gordon) – 2:53
6. "Stuffy" (Coleman Hawkins) – 2:59
7. "Just You, Just Me" (Jesse Greer, Raymond Klages) – 2:47
8. "Down to Earth" – 2:20
9. "What'll I Do" (Irving Berlin) – 3:50
10. "Fine and Dandy" (Kay Swift, Paul James) – 2:29
11. "Get Hot" – 2:27
12. "Solitude" (Duke Ellington, Eddie DeLange, Irving Mills) – 2:50

== Personnel ==
- Bill Jennings – guitar
- Leo Parker – baritone saxophone
- Andy Johnson – piano
- Joe Williams – bass
- George De Hart – drums
