= Elijah Fox =

American musician

- Also known as: Søren Søstrom
- Born: November 29, 1994 (age 31)
- Origin: Durham, North Carolina, U.S.
- Genres: Jazz; psychedelic soul
- Years active: 2015–present
- Label: Universal Music Group
- Website: elijahfoxofficial.com

Elijah Fox-Peck, known professionally as simply Elijah Fox (or the pseudonym Søren Søstrom), is an American instrumentalist, singer and record producer based in Los Angeles, California.

== Early life and education ==
Fox was born in Austin, Texas but grew up in Durham, North Carolina, and began playing the piano at age eleven. Both him and his brother were inspired by their grandmother, classical pianist Ruth Peck, to take up the instrument. He met Yusuf Salim through a local newspaper advert for a jazz jam session, who would then begin mentoring Fox to develop him as a musician. Fox graduated from Oberlin Conservatory of Music in 2017.

== Career ==
Fox moved to New York City after graduating from Oberlin. His piano work "East Village" was sampled by Drake and 21 Savage on "Major Distribution" which peaked at number 3 on the Billboard Hot 100. Fox has embarked on three improvised solo tours across the US and Europe. His song “Wyoming” went viral on TikTok and became a staple of the “core core” movement, receiving millions of streams. He has also performed many tours with his trio across the world, including a sold out show at the Montreal Jazz Festival. Now based in LA, in 2026 Fox collaborated on the Benny Sings song "Real Person". He has also scored for various movies, including working on M Night Shyamalan’s “Trap” on the songs “Release” and “Divine (ft Kid Cudi)”.

== Discography ==
=== Albums ===
- Time (2018)
- City in the Sky (Piano Works) (2020)
- Twelve Chapters (2022)
- Wyoming (Piano Works) (2023)
- Jan 14 (Improvisations) (2023)
- Ambient Works for the Highways of Los Angeles (2025)
