= Cookin' Sherry =

Studio album by Willis Jackson
- Released: 1961
- Recorded: November 9, 1959 and February 26 and August 16, 1960
- Studios: Van Gelder Studio, Englewood Cliffs, New Jersey
- Genre: Jazz
- Labels: Prestige; PR 7211
- Producer: Esmond Edwards

Willis Jackson chronology
Blue Gator (1960)	Cookin' Sherry (1961)	Together Again! (1965)

Professional ratings
Review scores
Source	Rating
AllMusic	4.5/5 stars

Cookin' Sherry is an album led by saxophonist Willis Jackson featuring which was recorded in 1959 and 1960 and released on the Prestige label.

== Track listing ==
All compositions by Willis Jackson except where noted.

1. "Mellow Blues" (Willis Jackson, Bill Jennings, Jack McDuff) – 9:01
2. "Sportin'" (Jackson, Jennings) – 4:47
3. "When I Fall in Love" (Edward Heyman, Victor Young) – 4:02
4. "Cookin' Sherry" – 8:14
5. "Where Are You?" (Harold Adamson, Jimmy McHugh) – 5:41
6. "Contrasts" (Jimmy Dorsey) – 5:46

Note

- Recorded at Van Gelder Studio in Englewood Cliffs, New Jersey on November 9, 1959 (track 3), February 26, 1960 (tracks 2, 5) and August 16, 1960 (tracks 1, 4, 6)

== Personnel ==
- Willis Jackson – tenor saxophone
- Jack McDuff – organ
- Bill Jennings – guitar
- Milt Hinton (tracks 2, 5), Wendell Marshall (tracks 1, 3, 4, 6) – bass
- Bill Elliot (tracks 1, 4, 6), Alvin Johnson (tracks 2, 3, 5) – drums
- Buck Clarke – congas (tracks 2, 5)

Production

- Esmond Edwards – supervision
- Rudy Van Gelder – recording
