= Groovin' with Jacquet =

Studio album by Illinois Jacquet and His Orchestra
- Released: 1956
- Recorded: May 24, 1951 and December 11, 1953; New York City
- Genre: Jazz
- Label: Clef; MGC 702
- Producer: Norman Granz

Illinois Jacquet chronology
Port of Rico (1952-53)	Groovin' with Jacquet (1956)	The Kid and the Brute (1954)

Groovin' with Jacquet (aka Groovin') is an album by American jazz saxophonist Illinois Jacquet, recorded in 1951 and late 1953 and released on the Clef label.

== Reception ==
Professional ratings
Review scores
Source	Rating
AllMusic	3/5 stars

AllMusic awarded the album 3 stars.

== Track listing ==
All compositions by Illinois Jacquet except as indicated

1. "Just A-Sittin' and A-Rockin'" (Duke Ellington, Billy Strayhorn, Lee Gaines) - 2:50
2. "Mean to Me" (Fred E. Ahlert, Roy Turk) - 3:16
3. "One Nighter Boogie" - 3:00
4. "Wrap Your Troubles in Dreams" (Harry Barrisl, Ted Koehler, Billy Moll) - 3:25
5. "Cotton Tail" (Ellington) - 2:52
6. "Weary Blues" - 3:12
7. "Groovin'" - 2:40
8. "Little Jeff" (Jacquet, Acea) - 2:41
9. "Jacquet Jumps" (Jacquet, Acea) - 1:49
10. "Blue Nocturne" " (Jacquet, Acea, Elwyn Frazier) - 3:07
11. "On Your Toes" (Jacquet, A. K. Salim) - 3:16
12. "R.U. One" (Jacquet, Salim) - 2:53
- Recorded in New York City on May 24, 1951 (tracks 1–7) and December 11, 1953 (tracks 8–12)

== Personnel ==
- Illinois Jacquet - tenor saxophone
- Russell Jacquet - trumpet (tracks 8–12)
- Matthew Gee - trombone (tracks 8–12)
- Cecil Payne - baritone saxophone (tracks 8–12)
- Johnny Acea (tracks 8–12), Hank Jones (tracks 1–7) - piano
- John Collins - guitar (tracks 1–7)
- Al Lucas (tracks 8–12), Gene Ramey (tracks 1–7) - bass
- Shadow Wilson (tracks 8–12), Art Blakey (tracks 1–7) - drums
