= Major Distribution (Drake and 21 Savage song) =

2022 song by Drake and 21 Savage

Song by Drake and 21 Savage

from the album Her Loss
- Released: November 4, 2022
- Recorded: 2022
- Studio: Leading by Example (Atlanta)
- Genre: Trap
- Length: 2:50
- Label: OVO; Republic
- Songwriters: Aubrey Graham; Shéyaa Abraham-Joseph; Miles McCollum; Edgar Ferrera; Tyshane Thompson; Elijah Fox-Peck
- Producer: SkipOnDaBeat

"Major Distribution" is a song by Canadian rapper Drake and Atlanta-based rapper 21 Savage from their collaborative studio album Her Loss (2022). Produced by SkipOnDaBeat, it samples "East Village" by Elijah Fox. The song peaked at number three on the Billboard Hot 100.

== Composition ==
In the song, Drake and 21 Savage "trade verses over a tense piano loop". The former raps about his success in the music industry, also mentioning having a three hour-dinner with someone lying to him and how he is buying Mercedes-Benz "out of spite", while the latter details his struggles, including the trauma he has experienced and his distrust of police. The song also features uncredited vocals from rapper Lil Yachty, who only hums in the track, as well as a beat switch.

== Critical reception ==
Mosi Reeves of Rolling Stone called the song an example of "aimless dross" on Her Loss. Paul A. Thompson of Pitchfork wrote in a review of the album, "he [Drake] and 21 are most effective when they either imitate one another", using Drake on "Major Distribution" as an example. Sam Hockley-Smith of NPR wrote in regard to the song, "But for all Drake's enthusiasm and looseness, it's 21 Savage who steals the show", and went on to praise Savage's verse: "His concerns are often real and serious, not imagined or shallow. As a result, 21 Savage's confidence feels earned. Drake, meanwhile, has flipped back toward the twisted contradiction at his core — this is a guy who will never, ever be happy, no matter his achievements."

== Charts ==
=== Weekly charts ===
Weekly chart performance for "Major Distribution"
Chart (2022)	Peak position
Australia (ARIA)	10
Austria (Ö3 Austria Top 40)	18
Canada Hot 100 (Billboard)	3
Denmark (Tracklisten)	27
France (SNEP)	85
Global 200 (Billboard)	3
Greece International (IFPI)	3
Iceland (Tónlistinn)	3
Ireland (IRMA)	5
Italy (FIMI)	45
Lithuania (AGATA)	6
Luxembourg (Billboard)	5
New Zealand (Recorded Music NZ)	4
Netherlands (Single Top 100)	24
Norway (VG-lista)	16
Portugal (AFP)	15
Romania (Billboard)	21
South Africa (RISA)	2
Sweden (Sverigetopplistan)	41
Switzerland (Schweizer Hitparade)	10
UK Singles (Official Charts)	5
UK Hip Hop/R&B (Official Charts)	2
US Billboard Hot 100	3
US Hot R&B/Hip-Hop Songs (Billboard)	2

=== Year-end charts ===
Year-end chart performance for "Major Distribution"
Chart (2023)	Position
US Hot R&B/Hip-Hop Songs (Billboard)	43

== Certifications ==
Certifications for "Major Distribution"
Region	Certification	Certified units/sales
Australia (ARIA)	Gold	35,000^{‡}
United States (RIAA)	Platinum	1,000,000^{‡}
^{‡} Sales+streaming figures based on certification alone.
