= The Message (Illinois Jacquet album) =

Studio album by Illinois Jacquet with Kenny Burrell
- Released: 1963
- Recorded: May 7 & 8, 1963
- Studio: Van Gelder Studio, Englewood Cliffs, New Jersey
- Genre: Jazz
- Length: 32:00
- Label: Argo; LP-722
- Producer: Esmond Edwards

Illinois Jacquet chronology
Illinois Jacquet (1963)	The Message (1963)	Desert Winds (1964)

The Message is an album by saxophonist Illinois Jacquet with guitarist Kenny Burrell recorded in 1963 and released on the Argo label.

== Reception ==
Professional ratings
Review scores
Source	Rating
Allmusic	3/5 stars
The Rolling Stone Jazz Record Guide	3/5 stars

Allmusic awarded the album 3 stars stating "This rather brief LP (just 31 minutes) finds tenorman Illinois Jacquet in typically fine form, but fronting a rather anonymous-sounding group (despite the presence of guitarist Kenny Burrell on some numbers)".

== Track listing ==
All compositions by Illinois Jacquet except where noted

1. "The Message" (Ben Tucker) - 3:45
2. "Wild Man" – 5:00
3. "Bassoon Blues" (Esmond Edwards, Illinois Jacquet) - 3:50
4. "On Broadway" (Barry Mann, Cynthia Weil, Jerry Leiber, Mike Stoller) - 4:00
5. "Like Young" (André Previn) - 4:00
6. "Turnpike" - 5:45
7. "Bonita" (Edwards) - 5:40

== Personnel ==
- Illinois Jacquet - tenor saxophone, bassoon
- Kenny Burrell, Wallace Richardson - guitar
- Ralph Smith - organ
- Ben Tucker - bass
- Ray Lucas - drums
- Willie Rodriguez - percussion
