= Yusuf Salim =

American jazz musician

Yusuf Salim (1929–31 July 2008), born Joseph Blair, was an American jazz pianist and composer.

Salim was born in Baltimore, Maryland, and began his musical career there at the age of 14 as a pianist with the Ken Murray Sextet. He was hired when aged 17 as the house pianist with the Royal Theatre, where he stayed for seven years with a band headed by Tracy McClair, who had played with the Bama State Collegians and Erskine Hawkins. While he worked at the Royal Theatre, he performed with entertainers such as Sammy Davis Jr., Moms Mabley, and Redd Foxx. In the late 1940s and early 1950s, he traveled to New York City with The Bill Swindell Band and performed at the Braddock Bar in Harlem. He also participated in jam sessions at Minton's Playhouse and Birdland in Manhattan.

In 1974, Salim moved to Durham, North Carolina. In 1977, he and three other people (Billy Stevens, Rodger Tygard, and Suman Bhatia) opened a restaurant and club called The Sallam Cultural Center that offered music workshops to train and further the careers of North Carolina jazz musicians, including vocalists Eve Cornelious and Nnenna Freelon, and pianist Chip Crawford who now tours with Gregory Porter. He also hosted a 13-part WUNC-TV (PBS) series called "Yusuf and Friends." Salim received the North Carolina Arts Council Jazz Fellowship in 1999. He wrote over 53 compositions, which have been recorded by Gary Bartz, Mongo Santamaria, Cannonball Adderley, and others. Salim mentored a young Elijah Fox.
