= Profoundly Blue =

Studio album by Tiny Grimes
- Released: 1973
- Recorded: March 6, 1973
- Genre: Jazz
- Label: Muse MR 5012
- Producer: Don Schlitten

Tiny Grimes chronology
Tiny Grimes (1970)	Profoundly Blue (1973)	Some Groovy Fours (1976)

Profoundly Blue is an album led by guitarist Tiny Grimes recorded in 1973 and released on the Muse label.

== Reception ==
Professional ratings
Review scores
Source	Rating
AllMusic	3/5 stars

In his review for AllMusic, Scott Yanow stated "The veteran swing guitarist Tiny Grimes had relatively few chances to record during the '60s and '70s, particularly for American labels. This enjoyable outing for Muse features Grimes in a sextet with tenor saxophonist Houston Person and pianist Harold Mabern".

== Track listing ==
All compositions by Tiny Grimes and Connie Hayes except as indicated

1. "Blue Midnight" – 6:48
2. "Backslider" – 4:27
3. "Tiny's Exercise" – 7:24
4. "Profoundly Blue" (Meade Lux Lewis) – 5:19
5. "Matilda" (Traditional) – 4:01
6. "Cookin' at the Cookery" – 10:03

== Personnel ==
- Tiny Grimes – guitar, vocals
- Houston Person – tenor saxophone
- Harold Mabern – piano
- Jimmy Lewis – electric bass
- Freddie Waits – drums
- Gene Golden – congas
