= Brother Jack =

Studio album by Jack McDuff with Bill Jennings
- Released: 1960
- Recorded: January 25, 1960
- Studio: Van Gelder Studio, Englewood Cliffs, New Jersey
- Genre: Jazz
- Label: Prestige; PR 7174
- Producer: Esmond Edwards

Jack McDuff chronology
Brother Jack (1960)	Tough 'Duff (1960)

Brother Jack is the debut album by organist Jack McDuff recorded in 1960 and released on the Prestige label.

== Reception ==
Professional ratings
Review scores
Source	Rating
AllMusic	3/5 stars

AllMusic reviewer Jim Todd stated: "Recorded in 1960, the session is a transitional one, both for jazz organ and for one of the instrument's leading players".

== Track listing ==
All compositions by Jack McDuff, except where indicated.

1. "Brother Jack" – 4:00
2. "Mr. Wonderful" (Jerry Bock, Larry Holofcener, George David Weiss) – 3:53
3. "Noon Train" – 5:51
4. "Drowsy" – 3:37
5. "Organ Grinder's Swing" (Will Hudson, Irving Mills, Mitchell Parish) – 2:55
6. "Mack 'N' Duff" – 5:10
7. "You're Driving Me Crazy" (Walter Donaldson) – 4:47
8. "Light Blues" (Bill Jennings, Jack McDuff) – 6:01

== Personnel ==
- Jack McDuff – Hammond B3 organ
- Bill Jennings – guitar
- Wendell Marshall – bass
- Alvin Johnson – drums
