= Russell Jacquet =

American jazz trumpeter (1917–1990)

- Born: December 4, 1917; Saint Martinville, Louisiana, U.S.
- Died: February 28, 1990 (aged 72) Los Angeles, California, U.S.
- Genres: Jazz
- Instrument: Trumpet

Russell Jacquet (December 4, 1917 – February 28, 1990) was an American trumpeter.

== Biography ==
Jacquet was born on December 4, 1917, in Saint Martinville, Louisiana, United States. He was the elder brother of well-known tenor saxophonist Illinois Jacquet, whom he worked with through the years. Jacquet had stints with Floyd Ray and Milt Larkin before he began studying music at Wiley College and Texas Southern University.

He moved west and played with his brother's band for a time, later forming his own group which became the house band at the Cotton Club from 1945 to 1949. He then rejoined his brother's group. He later played with several small groups in Oakland, California, and in Houston with Arnett Cobb, and on a few dates in New York with his brother.

He died of a heart attack on February 28, 1990, in Los Angeles, California, aged 72.

== Discography ==
With Illinois Jacquet

- Groovin' with Jacquet (Clef, 1951-53 [1956])
- The Kid and the Brute (Clef, 1955)
- Spectrum (Argo, 1965)
- The Soul Explosion (Prestige, 1969)
