= Tiny Grimes =

American jazz and R&B guitarist (1916–1989)

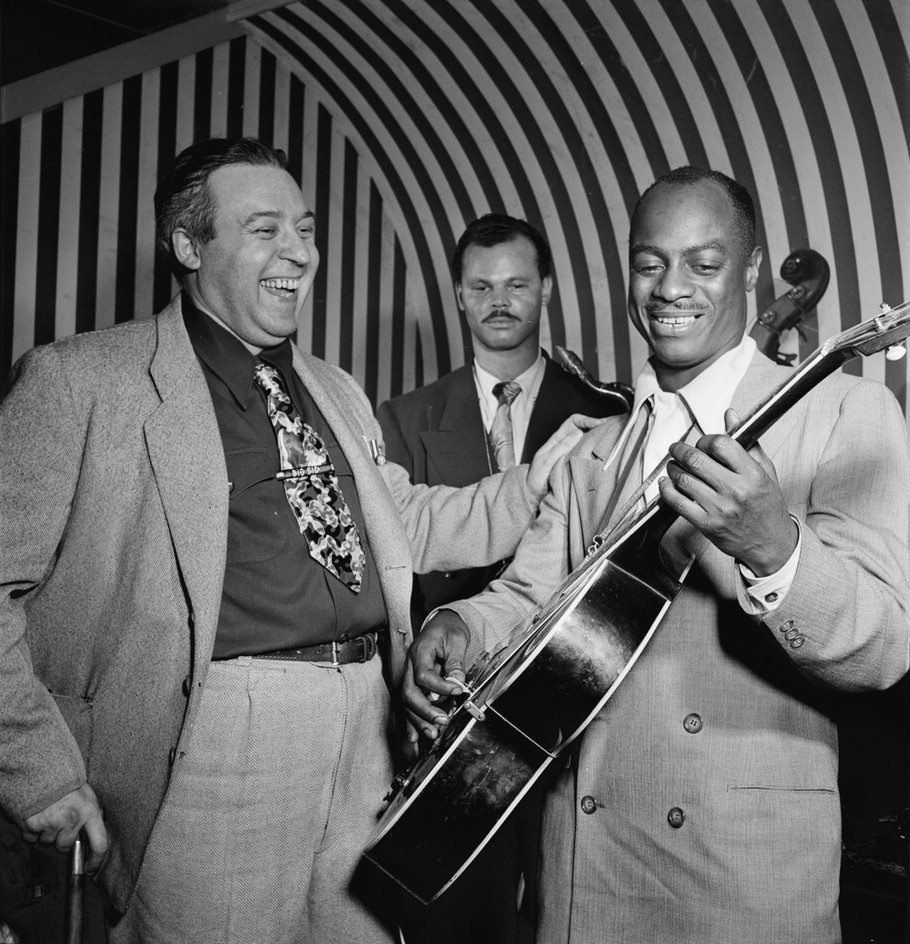
- Hugues Panassié (left) Red Prysock (middle), and Grimes (right), New York City, c. 1947; by William P. Gottlieb

Background information
- Born: Lloyd Grimes; July 7, 1916; Newport News, Virginia, U.S.
- Died: March 4, 1989 (aged 72) New York City, U.S.
- Genres: Jazz; R&B
- Occupation: Musician
- Instrument: Tenor guitar
- Works: Discography
- Years active: 1940–1970s
- Labels: Prestige; United Artists; Status; Black & Blue; Muse; Sonet

Lloyd "Tiny" Grimes (July 7, 1916 – March 4, 1989) was an American jazz and R&B guitarist. He was a member of the Art Tatum Trio from 1943 to 1944, was a backing musician on recording sessions, and later led his own bands. He did a recording session with Charlie Parker. He is notable for playing the electric tenor guitar, a four-stringed instrument.

== Biography ==
Grimes was born in Newport News, Virginia, United States, and began his musical career playing the drums and one-fingered piano. In 1938, he took up the electric four-string tenor guitar. In 1940, he joined the Cats and the Fiddle as guitarist and singer. In 1943, he joined the Art Tatum Trio as guitarist, with whom he made a number of recordings.

After leaving Tatum, Grimes recorded with his own groups in New York and with a long list of leading musicians, including vocalist Billie Holiday. He made four recordings with his own group, augmented with Charlie Parker: "Tiny's Tempo", "Red Cross", "Romance Without Finance", and "I'll Always Love You Just the Same", the latter two featuring Grimes' singing.

In the late 1940s, he had a hit on a jazzed-up version of "Loch Lomond", with the band billed as "Tiny 'Mac' Grimes and the Rocking Highlanders" and appearing in kilts. This group included tenor saxophonist Red Prysock and singer Screamin' Jay Hawkins. Grimes continued to lead his own groups into the late 1970s, and he recorded on Prestige Records in a series of strong blues-based performances with Coleman Hawkins, Illinois Jacquet, Pepper Adams, Roy Eldridge, and other notable players, including, in 1977, Earl Hines.

With Paul Williams, he co-headlined the first Moondog Coronation Ball, promoted by Alan Freed in Cleveland, Ohio, on March 21, 1952, often claimed as the first rock and roll concert. In 1953 he may have played on the Crows one-hit wonder, "Gee", that has been called the first original rock and roll record by an R&B group.

Grimes died in March 1989 at age 72, in New York City, from meningitis.

== Discography ==
- Blues Groove with Coleman Hawkins (Prestige, 1958)
- Callin' the Blues with J. C. Higginbotham (Prestige, 1958)
- Tiny in Swingville with Jerome Richardson (Prestige, 1959)
- Hawk Eyes with Coleman Hawkins and Charlie Shavers (Prestige, 1959)
- Big Time Guitar with Organ and Rhythm (United Artists, 1962)
- Guitar Soul with Kenny Burrell and Bill Jennings (Status, 1965)
- Tiny Grimes (Black & Blue, 1970)
- Profoundly Blue (Muse, 1973)
- Some Groovy Fours (Black & Blue, 1974)
- One Is Never Too Old to Swing with Roy Eldridge (Sonet, 1977)
