= Milt Buckner =

American jazz pianist and organist (1915–1977)

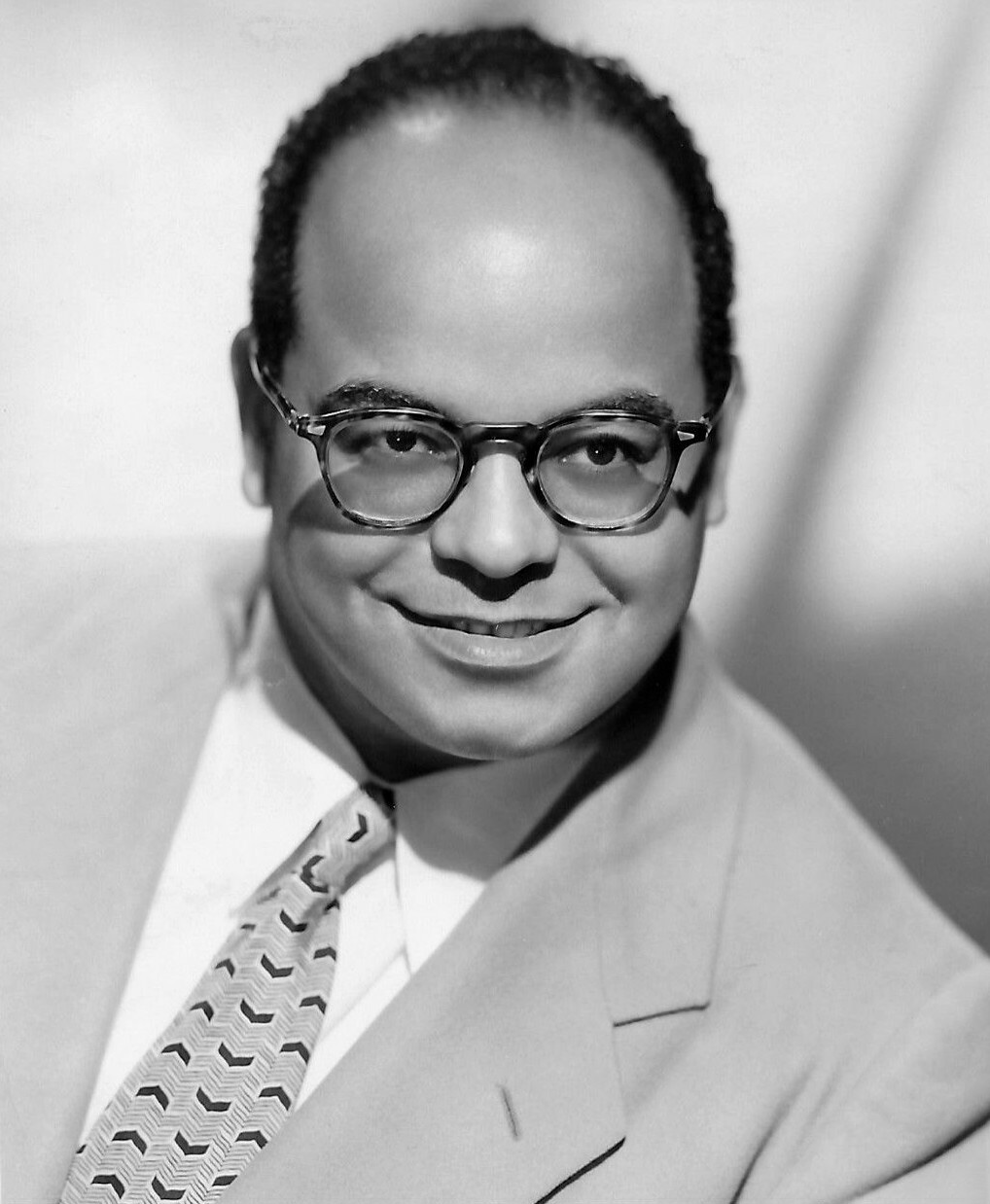

Background information
- Birth name: Milton Brent Buckner
- Born: July 10, 1915 St. Louis, Missouri, U.S.
- Died: July 27, 1977 (aged 62) Chicago, Illinois, U.S.
- Genres: Jazz
- Occupation: Musician
- Instrument(s): Piano, Hammond B3 organ
- Years active: 1930s–1975

Milton Brent Buckner (July 10, 1915 – July 27, 1977) was an American jazz pianist and organist, who in the early 1950s popularized the Hammond organ. He pioneered the parallel chords style that influenced Red Garland, George Shearing, Bill Evans, and Oscar Peterson. Buckner's brother, Ted Buckner, was a jazz saxophonist.

== Early life and career ==
Milton Brent Buckner was born in St. Louis, Missouri. His parents encouraged him to learn to play piano, but they both died when he was nine years old. Milt and his younger brother Ted were sent to Detroit where they were adopted by members of the Earl Walton band: trombonist John Tobias, drummer George Robinson fostered Milt and reedplayer Fred Kewley (né Fred Cecil Kewley; 1889–1953) fostered Ted. Buckner studied piano for three years from the age 10, then at 15 began writing arrangements for the band, he and his brother going on to become active in the Detroit jazz world in the 1930s.

Buckner first played in Detroit with the McKinney's Cotton Pickers and then with Cab Calloway. In 1941, he joined Lionel Hampton's big band, and for the next seven years served as its pianist and staff arranger. Buckner was part of a Variety Revue of 1950 organized by Lionel Hampton at the Cavalcade of Jazz concert held at Wrigley Field in Los Angeles which was produced by Leon Hefflin, Sr. on June 25, 1950. He led a short-lived big band of his own for two years, but then returned to Hampton's in 1950. In 1952, he formed his own trio and pioneered the use of the electric Hammond organ. He often played in Europe in the late 1960s. His last studio session took place in Paris on July 4, 1977. Milt Buckner is also known for the use of his song "The Beast" in the film Mulholland Drive and in the title menu of the video game Battlefield: Bad Company.

Buckner died of a heart attack in July 1977, in Chicago, Illinois, at the age of 62.

== Discography ==
- "Vibe Boogie" (with Lionel Hampton) (V-Disc 404, 1945)
- "Chord-A-Re-Bop" (with Lionel Hampton) (Decca 18830, 1946)
- Milton Buckner: The Swinging Block-Chords Pianist 1943–1950 (EPM Musique 16018, 2002)
- The Chronological Milt Buckner 1946–1951 (Classics 'Blues & Rhythm Series' 5032, 2002)
- "Milt's Boogie" b/w "Buck's Bop" (MGM 10410, 1949)
- "M.B. Blues" b/w "Oo-Be-Doop" (MGM 10504, 1949)
- "Buck-A-Boo" b/w "Yesterdays" (MGM 10632, 1949)
- Milt Buckner Piano (Savoy MG-15023 [10" LP], 1953) – note: includes 6 of the 13 tracks Buckner's Beale Street Gang recorded for Savoy in 1946, 1947, 1948, and 1951.
- Organ...Sweet 'N' Swing (Regent MG-6004, 1956) – note: a shared album with Bobby Banks, and Vin Strong; includes 4 of the 6 tracks Buckner's trio recorded for Scooter Records (a subsidiary of Roost) in 1952: "By The River St. Marie", "Rollin' Strollin'", Take It Away", and "Russian Lullaby".
- Rockin' with Milt (Capitol T-642, 1955; CD reissue: Jasmine JASCD-499, 2009)
- Rockin' Hammond (Capitol T-722, 1956; CD reissue: Jasmine JASCD-499, 2009)
- Send Me Softly (Capitol T-938, 1957; CD reissue: Solar [EU] 4569921, 2012)
- Mighty High (Argo LPS-660, 1959; CD reissue: Solar [EU] 4569916, 2012)
- Please, Mr. Organ Player (Argo LPS-670, 1960; CD reissue: Solar [EU] 4569921, 2012)
- Midnight Mood (Argo LPS-702, 1961; CD reissue: Solar [EU] 4569916, 2012)
- The New World of Milt Buckner (Bethlehem BCP-6072, 1963)
- Play Chords (SABA 15110, 1966)
- Them There Eyes (with Buddy Tate) (Black & Blue 33.013, 1967)
- Locked Hands (MPS 15199, 1968)
- More Chords (MPS 15237, 1969)
- Rockin' Again (Black & Blue 33.043, 1972)
- Black and Blue Stomp (Black & Blue, 33.061, 1973)
- Block Chords Parade (Black & Blue 33.184, 1974 [rel. 1984]; CD reissue: Black & Blue BB-953, 2002)
- Green Onions (with Roy Gaines) (Black & Blue 33.087, 1975; Classic Jazz CJ-141, 1980; CD reissue: Black & Blue BB-929, 2000)
- Milt Buckner & His Alumni (The Definitive Black & Blue Sessions) (Black & Blue BB-909, 1976 [rel. 1998])
- Boogie Woogie USA (Black & Blue 33.120, 1977)

=== As sideman ===
With Clarence "Gatemouth" Brown

- Sings Louis Jordan (Black & Blue 33.053, 1973)
- Cold Strange (Black & Blue 33.096, 1973 [rel. 1976])

With Arnett Cobb

- Again with Milt Buckner (Black & Blue 33.052, 1973)
- Midnight Slows, Vol. 3 (with Floyd "Candy" Johnson too!) (Black & Blue 33.055, 1973)
- Midnight Slows, Vol. 6 (Black & Blue 33.093, 1976)
- The Wild Man From Texas (Black & Blue 33.099, 1976)

With Eddie "Lockjaw" Davis

- Leapin' on Lenox (Black & Blue 33.072, 1974)

With Roy Gaines

- Superman (Black & Blue, 33.088, 1975)

With Tiny Grimes

- Chasin with Milt (Black & Blue 33.017, 1968)

With Illinois Jacquet

- Go Power! (Cadet LPS-773, 1966)
- The King! (Prestige PR-7597, 1968)
- The Soul Explosion (Prestige PR-7629, 1969)
- Genius at Work! (Black Lion BL-146, 1971)
- Illinois Jacquet with Milt and Jo (Black & Blue 33.070, 1974)
- Jacquet's Street (Black & Blue 33.112, 1976)

With Floyd "Candy" Johnson

- Candy's Mood (with Clarence "Gatemouth" Brown too!) (Black & Blue 33.058, 1973)

With Guy Lafitte

- Midnight Slows, Vol. 7 (Black & Blue 33.115, 1977)

With Jay McShann

- Jumpin' the Blues (Black & Blue 33.039, 1970 [rel. 1972])
- Kansas City Memories (Black & Blue 33.057, 1973)

With Buddy Morrow

- Night Train Goes to Hollywood (Mercury MG-20702/SR-60702, 1962)

With Andre Persiany

- Pianistically Yours (Black & Blue 33.176, 1975–1976 [rel. 1982])

With Hal Singer

- Milt And Hal (with Tiny Grimes too!) (Black & Blue 33.016, 1968)

With Buddy Tate

- When I'm Blue (Black & Blue 33.014, 1967)
- Crazy Rhythm (Black & Blue 33.018, 1968)
- Midnight Slows, Vol. 1 (Black & Blue 33.026, 1971)
- Midnight Slows, Vol. 4 (Black & Blue 33.068, 1974)
- Midnight Slows, Vol. 5 (Black & Blue 33.075, 1974)

With Marcel Zanini

- Blues and Bounce! (Black & Blue 33.110, 1976)
