= Illinois Jacquet =

American jazz saxophonist (1922–2004)

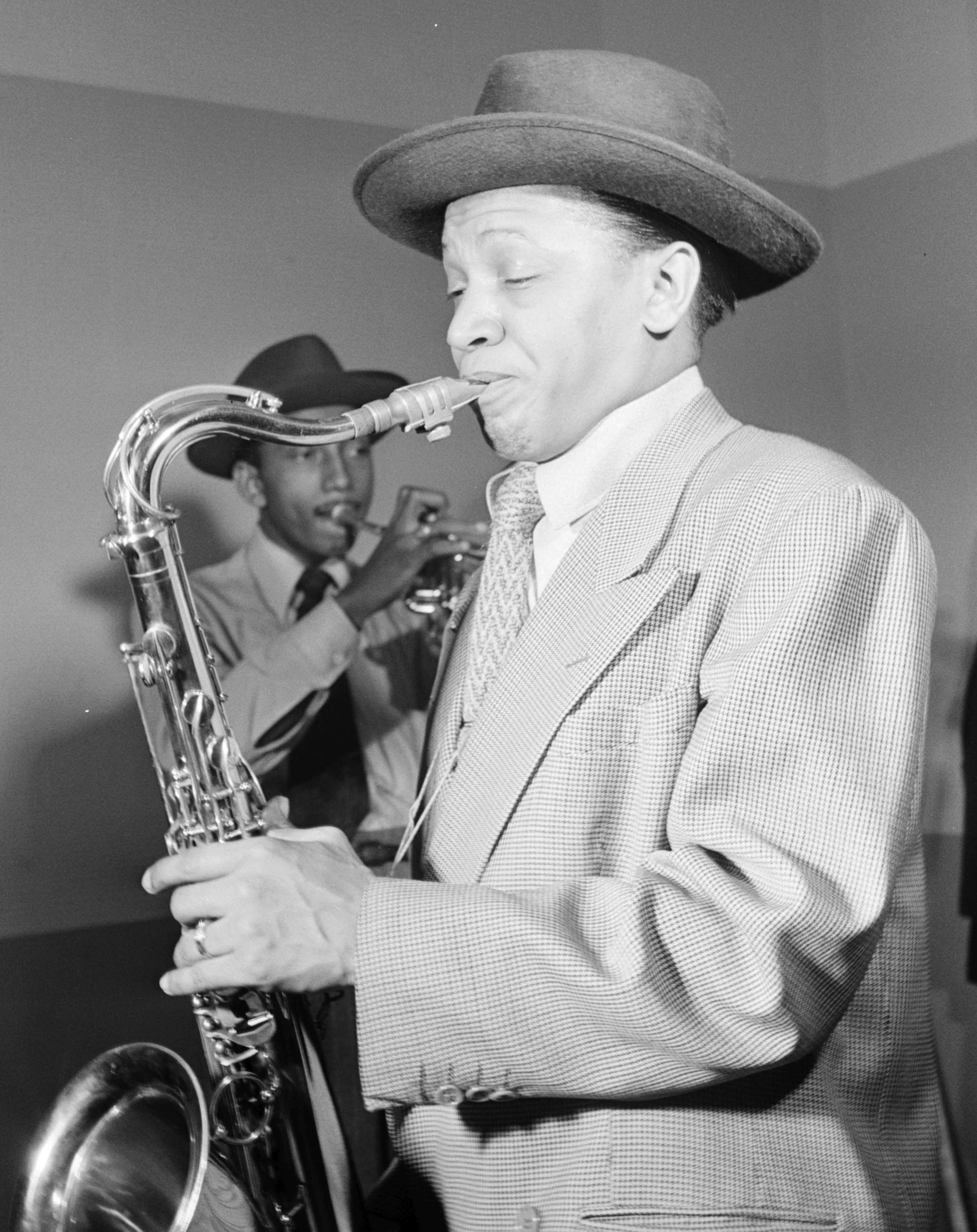
- Jacquet in New York City, 1947; by William P. Gottlieb

Background information
- Born: Jean-Baptiste Illinois Jacquet; October 30, 1922; Broussard, Louisiana, U.S.
- Died: July 22, 2004 (aged 81) New York City, U.S.
- Genres: Jazz; swing; bebop; jump blues
- Occupations: Musician; bandleader; composer
- Instruments: Tenor saxophone; alto saxophone; bassoon
- Years active: 1941–2004
- Labels: Apollo; Savoy; Aladdin; RCA; Verve; Mercury; Roulette; Epic; Argo; Prestige; Black Lion; Black & Blue; Atlantic
- Formerly of: Lionel Hampton Orchestra; Cab Calloway's Orchestra; Count Basie Orchestra; Illinois Jacquet Big Band
- Burial place: Woodlawn Cemetery
- Relatives: Russell Jacquet (brother)

Jean-Baptiste Illinois Jacquet (/dʒæˈkɛt/ ja-KET; October 30, 1922 – July 22, 2004) was an American jazz tenor saxophonist, best remembered for his solo on "Flying Home", critically recognized as the first R&B saxophone solo. He is also known as one of the writers of the jazz standard "Don'cha Go 'Way Mad."

Although he was a pioneer of the honking tenor saxophone that became a regular feature of jazz playing and a hallmark of early rock and roll, Jacquet was a skilled and melodic improviser, both on up-tempo tunes and ballads. He doubled on the bassoon, one of only a few jazz musicians to use the instrument.

== Early life ==
Jacquet's parents were the Creoles of color Marguerite Trahan and Gilbert Jacquet. When he was an infant, his family moved from Louisiana to Houston, Texas, and he was raised there as one of six siblings. His father was a part-time bandleader. As a child, Jacquet performed in his father's band, primarily on the alto saxophone. His older brother Russell played the trumpet and his other brother Linton, the drums.

At age 15, Jacquet began playing with the Milton Larkin Orchestra, a Houston-area dance band. He attended Wheatley High School. In 1939, he moved to Los Angeles, California, where he met Nat King Cole; Jacquet would sit in with Cole's trio on occasion. In 1940, Cole introduced Jacquet to Lionel Hampton, who had returned to California and was putting together a big band. Hampton wanted to hire Jacquet but asked the young Jacquet to switch to tenor saxophone.

== Career ==
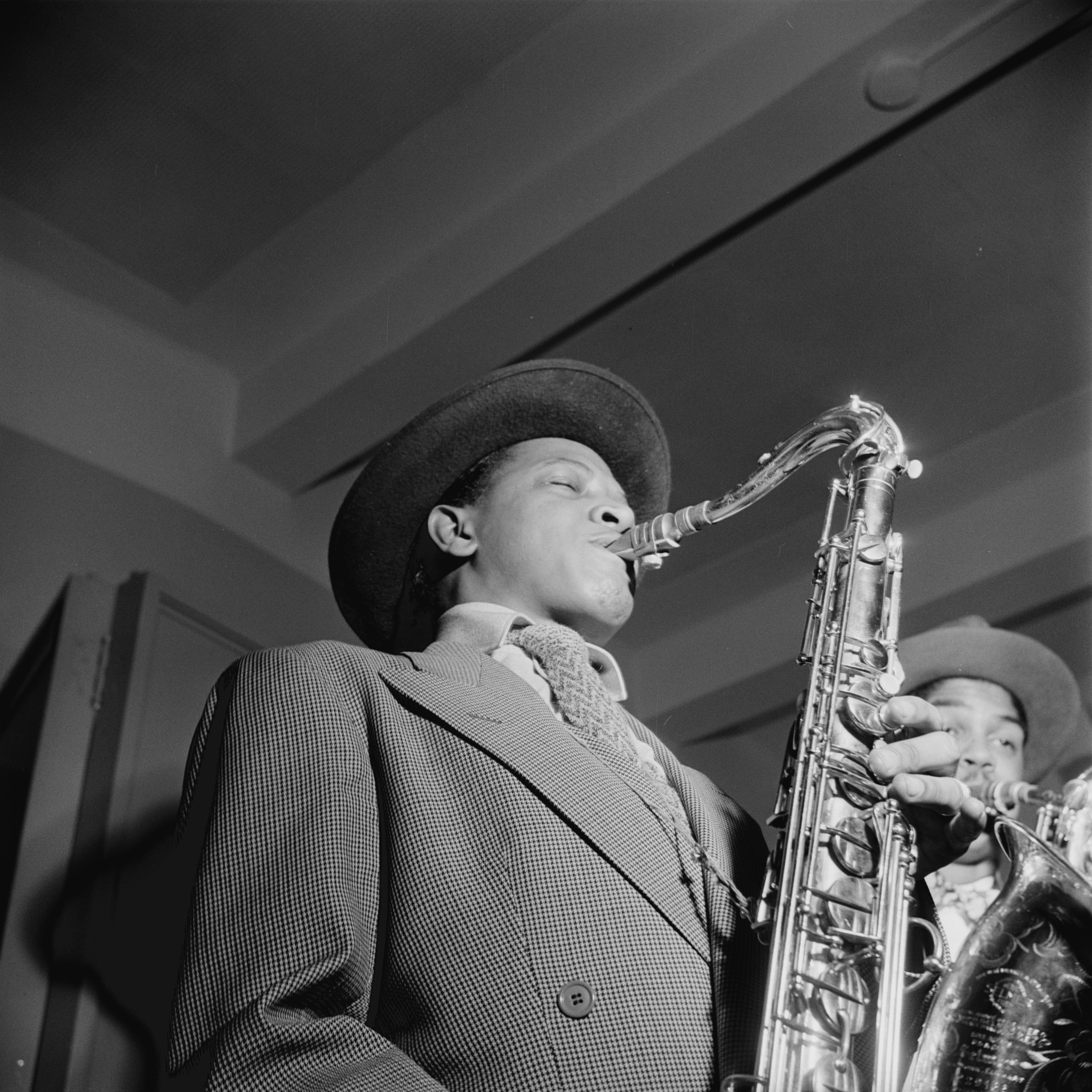
Jacquet in 1941; by William P. Gottlieb

In 1942, at age 19, Jacquet soloed on the Lionel Hampton Orchestra's recording of "Flying Home", one of the first times a "honking" tenor saxophone was heard on record. The record became a hit; the song immediately became the climax for the live shows and Jacquet became exhausted from having to "bring down the house" every night. The solo was built to weave in and out of the arrangement and continued to be played by every saxophone player who followed Jacquet in the band, including Arnett Cobb and Dexter Gordon, who achieved almost as much attention as Jacquet in playing it. It is one of the few jazz solos to have been memorized and played very much the same way by everyone who played the song. Jacquet left the Hampton band in 1943 and joined Cab Calloway's Orchestra.

Jacquet appeared with Calloway's band in the musical film Stormy Weather (1943), starring Lena Horne. In the earlier years of Jacquet's career, his brother Linton managed him on the Chitlin' Circuit. Linton's daughter, Brenda Jacquet-Ross, would go on to sing in jazz venues in the San Francisco Bay Area in the 1990s to early 2000s with a band called the Mondo Players.

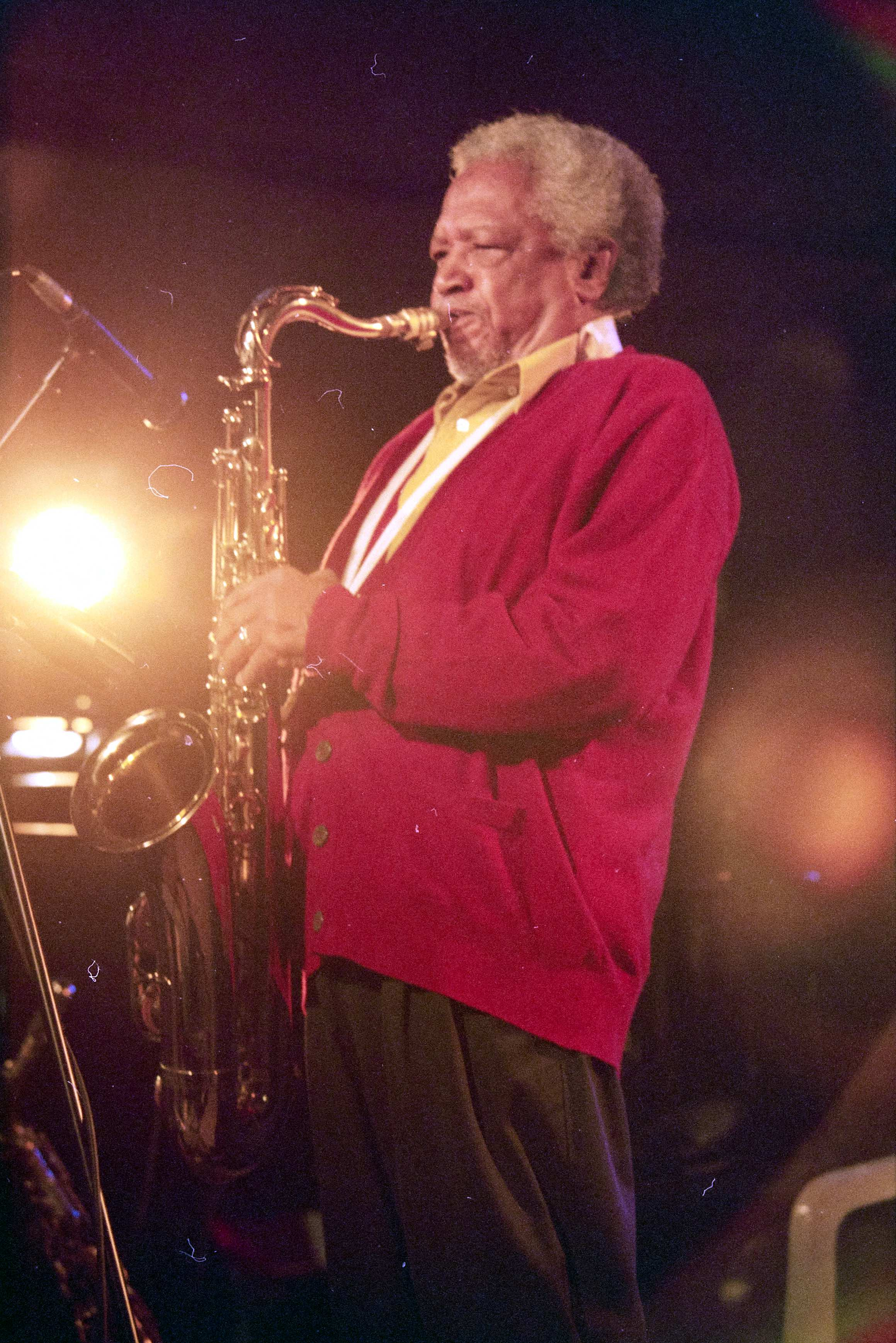
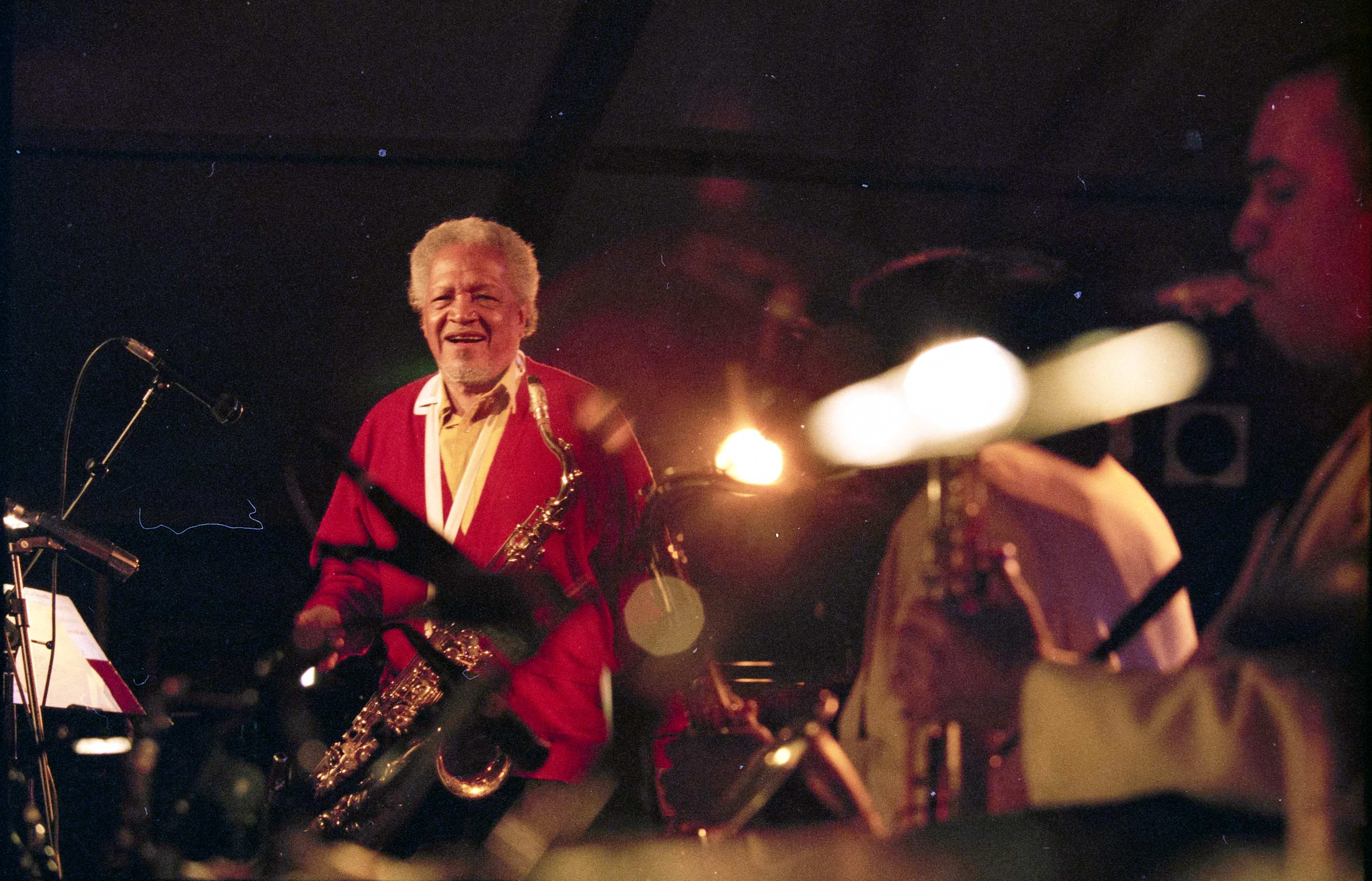
Jacquet at the Meer Jazz Festival, Hoofddorp, Netherlands, 1998

In 1944, Jacquet returned to California and started a small band with his brother Russell and a young Charles Mingus. It was at this time that he appeared in the Academy Award–nominated short film Jammin' the Blues with the tenor saxophonist Lester Young. He also appeared at the first Jazz at the Philharmonic concert, produced by Norman Granz. In 1946, he moved to New York City and joined the Count Basie Orchestra, replacing Young.

Jacquet wrote the instrumental "Black Velvet" with Jimmy Mundy in 1949 and recorded it the same year. Al Stillman put lyrics to it, and it was recorded later the same year by Harry James as "Don'cha Go 'Way Mad". The song has since been performed by dozens of performers, including Frank Sinatra and Ella Fitzgerald.

In 1952, Jacquet co-wrote "Just When We're Falling in Love" with Charles Thompson, lyrics by Bob Russell. Jacquet continued to perform in small groups through the 1960s and 1970s, mostly in Europe, and he led the Illinois Jacquet Big Band from 1981 until his death.

Jacquet became the first jazz musician to be an artist-in-residence at Harvard University, in 1983. He played "C Jam Blues" with President Bill Clinton on the White House lawn during Clinton's inaugural ball in 1993. Jacquet's final performance was on July 16, 2004, at the Lincoln Center in New York.

== Personal life and death ==
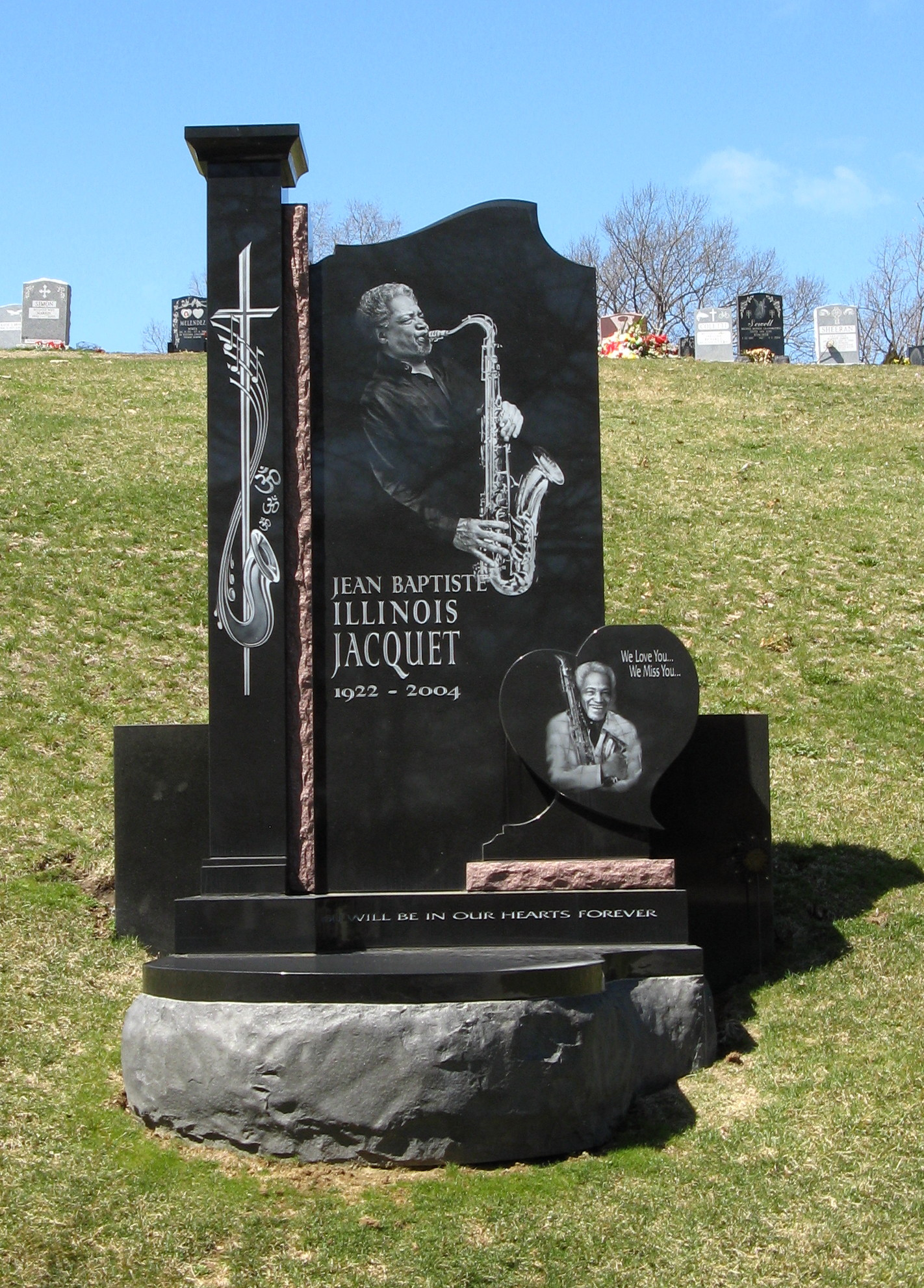
Jacquet's grave at Woodlawn Cemetery in the Bronx

Jacquet was first married to Jacqueline Jacquet. His second marriage, to the socialite Barbara Jacquet, ended in divorce; they had a daughter, Pamela Jacquet Davis.

Jacquet was Catholic.

Jacquet died in the home he shared with his longtime partner, Carol Scherick, in Queens, New York, of a heart attack on July 22, 2004. He was 81 years old. A memorial service was held at Riverside Church, and was interred in Woodlawn Cemetery in the Bronx.

== Influence ==
Jacquet's solos of the early and mid-1940s and his performances at the Jazz at the Philharmonic concert series influenced rhythm and blues and rock and roll saxophone style, but which also continue to be heard in jazz. His honking and screeching emphasized the lower and higher registers of the tenor saxophone. Despite a superficial rawness, the style is heard in jazz players like Arnett Cobb, who also became known for playing "Flying Home" with Lionel Hampton, as well as Sonny Rollins, Eddie "Lockjaw" Davis, and Jimmy Forrest.

== Activism ==
Jacquet pushed back against Jim Crow laws in Houston. After booking his band to play at the Rice Hotel, he protested against management's rule that African Americans should enter the premises through an alley door. He issued an ultimatum: either allow his all-black orchestra to access the hotel through the main entrance or he would cancel the engagement. The Rice Hotel agreed to suspend the Jim Crow rule for Jacquet's band.

After leaving Houston to tour the United States and several other countries, Jacquet contemplated the manner in which he would return:

I love Houston, Texas. ... This is where I went to school. This is where I learned everything I know. I was just fed up with coming to Houston with a mixed cast on stage and playing to a segregated audience. I wanted Houston to see a hell of a concert, and they should see it like they were in Carnegie Hall. I felt if I didn't do anything about the segregation in my hometown, I would regret it. This was the time to do it. Segregation had to come to an end.

The jazz impresario Norman Granz, who was a social activist himself, made arrangements for the star-studded Jazz at the Philharmonic band to play an engagement at Houston's Music Hall on October 5, 1955. Jacquet played saxophone, accompanying Ella Fitzgerald, Dizzy Gillespie, Oscar Peterson, and Buddy Rich. Granz and Jacquet collaborated to eliminate Jim Crow customs from the event. There were no advanced sales of tickets, while Granz removed all of the "white" and "black" signs, which indicated segregated facilities within the venue, and hired off-duty Houston police officers for security. The band played before a non-segregated audience, though not completely free of trouble. Despite Granz's precaution, five officers of the Houston Vice Squad stormed Fitzgerald's dressing room with firearms drawn. Jacquet and Gillespie were playing dice games, which the Vice Squad used as a pretext for arresting Jacquet, Gillespie, Fitzgerald, and her assistant. This was a performance within a performance, however, as the quartet was whisked to the police station, where there were waiting photographers. After paying their fines, they all returned to the Music Hall, where the band played the second set with the audience none the wiser.

== Memorial ==
In 2008, the Chapel of the Sisters in Prospect Cemetery was restored and re-dedicated as the Illinois Jacquet Performance Space on the grounds of York College in Jamaica, Queens.

== Discography ==
=== As leader ===
- 1951: Battle of the Saxes (Aladdin LP-701 [10"]) – with Lester Young
- 1951: Illinois Jacquet: Collates (Mercury/Clef MGC-112 [10"])
- 1952: Illinois Jacquet: Collates, No. 2 (Mercury/Clef MGC-129 [10"])
- 1953: Jazz by Jacquet (Clef MGC-167 [10"])
- 1953: Jazz Moods by Illinois Jacquet (Clef MGC-622)
- 1954: Illinois Jacquet and His Tenor Sax (Aladdin LP-708 [10"]; Aladdin LP-803 [rel. 1956]; Imperial LP-9184/LP-12184 [rel. 1962])
- 1954: The Kid and the Brute (Clef MGC-680; Verve MGV-8065) – with Ben Webster
- 1955: Illinois Jacquet [septet] (Clef MGC-676; Verve MGV-8061) – with Harry "Sweets" Edison
- 1956: Jazz Moode (Clef MGC-700; Verve MGV-8084) – compilation of MGC-112, MGC-129, MGC-622
- 1956: Port of Rico (Clef MGC-701; Verve MGV-8085) – compilation of MGC-129, MGC-167, MGC-622
- 1956: Groovin' with Jacquet (Clef MGC-702; Verve MGV-8086) – compilation of MGC-112, MGC-129, MGC-167, MGC-622
- 1956: Swing's the Thing (Clef MGC-750; Verve MGV-8023) – reissued on CD in 2005 by Lone Hill Jazz (LHJ-10228)
- 1959: Illinois Jacquet Flies Again (Roulette SR-52035) – reissued on CD in 2005 by Lone Hill Jazz (LHJ-10229)
- 1962: Illinois Jacquet And His Orchestra (Epic BA-17033) – with Roy Eldridge; reissued on CD in 2005 by Lone Hill Jazz (LHJ-10229)
- 1963: The Message (Argo LPS-722) – with Kenny Burrell; reissued on CD in 2005 by Lone Hill Jazz (LHJ-10230)
- 1964: Desert Winds (Argo LPS-735) – with Kenny Burrell; reissued on CD in 2005 by Lone Hill Jazz (LHJ-10230)
- 1964: Bosses of the Ballad: Illinois Jacquet and Strings Play Cole Porter (Argo LPS-746) – reissued on CD in 2005 by Lone Hill Jazz (LHJ-10231)
- 1965: Spectrum (Argo LPS-754) – reissued on CD in 2005 by Lone Hill Jazz (LHJ-10231)
- 1966; Go Power! (Cadet LPS-773) – with Milt Buckner and Alan Dawson, recorded live at Lennie's on the Turnpike in West Peabody, Massachusetts; reissued on CD in 2005 by Lone Hill Jazz (LHJ-10232)
- 1968: Bottoms Up: Illinois Jacquet on Prestige! (Prestige PR-7575) – CD reissue: Original Jazz Classics OJC-417
- 1968: The King! (Prestige PR-7597) – CD reissue: Original Jazz Classics OJC-849
- 1969: The Soul Explosion (Prestige PR-7629) – CD reissue: Original Jazz Classics OJC-674
- 1969: The Blues; That's Me! (Prestige PR-7731) – with Tiny Grimes; CD reissue: Original Jazz Classics OJC-614
- 1971: Genius at Work! (Recorded Live at the Ronnie Scott Club, London) (Black Lion BL-146) – reissued on CD as The Comeback (Black Lion BLCD-760160)
- 1973: Volume 1: Jazz at Town Hall (J.R.C. 11433) – with Arnett Cobb
- 1973: The Blues from Louisiana (J.R.C. 11433; Classic Jazz) – reissue of Jazz at Town Hall
- 1973: Illinois Jacquet with Wild Bill Davis (Disques Black & Blue 33.044; Classic Jazz CJ-112 [rel. 1978]) – with Wild Bill Davis; reissued on CD as The Man I Love (Black & Blue BB-865)
- 1973: Illinois Jacquet with Wild Bill Davis, Vol. 2 (Disques Black & Blue 33.082)
- 1974: Illinois Jacquet with Milt and Jo (Disques Black & Blue 33.070) – with Milt Buckner and Jo Jones; reissued on CD as Bottoms Up (Black & Blue BB-893)
- 1975: Volume 2: Birthday Party (J.R.C. 11434) – with James Moody; reissued on CD in 1999 by Groove Note
- 1976: Here Comes Freddy (Sonet SNTF-714) – with Howard McGhee; CD reissue: Sonet SNTCD-714
- 1976: Jacquet's Street (Disques Black & Blue 33.112; Classic Jazz CJ-146 [rel. 1981]) (CD reissue: Black & Blue BB-972)
- 1978: God Bless My Solo (Disques Black & Blue 33.167 – CD reissue: Black & Blue BB-941
- 1982: The Cool Rage (Verve VE2-2544) – 2-LP compilation that also includes 4 previously unreleased tracks from 1958 with Wild Bill Davis and Kenny Burrell; the 4 tracks from the 1958 session are reissued on CD by Lone Hill Jazz (LHJ-10228)
- 1983: Jazz at the Philharmonic: Blues in Chicago 1955 (Verve 815155) – with Oscar Peterson and Herb Ellis
- 1988: Jacquet's Got It! (Atlantic 81816)
- 1988: The Black Velvet Band (Bluebird/RCA 6571-1-RB) – rec. 1947–50
- 1989: Banned in Boston (Portrait/CBS RJ-44391) – reissue of Illinois Jacquet and His Orchestra (BA-17033)
- 1991: Loot to Boot (LRC [Lester Radio Corporation] 9034) – reissue of The Last Blues Album, Volume 1 (Groove Merchant GM-3303) plus 3 tracks from Illinois Jacquet with Wild Bill Davis (Classic Jazz CJ-112)
- 1994: Flying Home: The Best of the Verve Years (Verve 521644)
- 1994: Jazz at the Philharmonic: The First Concert (Verve 521646) – rec. 1944; with Nat King Cole, Les Paul, and J. J. Johnson
- 1994: Illinois Jacquet and His All Star New York Band (JSP 212) – rec. 1980
- 1996: The Complete Illinois Jacquet Sessions 1945–1950 (Mosaic MD4-0165) – 4-CD box set; contains all his Philo/Aladdin, Apollo, ARA, Savoy, and RCA Victor material
- 2002: The Illinois Jacquet Story (Proper BOX 49) – rec. 1944–51; 4-CD box set
- 2002: Jumpin' at Apollo (Delmark DE-538) – rec. 1945–47
- 2003: Live at Schaffhausen, Switzerland: March 18, 1978 (Storyville; UPC: 4526180360506)
- 2006: Swingin' Live with Illinois Jacquet: His Final Performance (Jacquet Records; UPC: 837101208147) – rec. 2004; 2-CD
- 2013: Toronto 1947 (Uptown; UPC: 026198277321) – with Leo Parker
- 2014: Live in Berlin 1987 (Squatty Roo; UPC: 686647021204)
- 2014: Live in Burghausen 1996 (Squatty Roo; UPC: 686647022102)

=== As sideman ===
With Count Basie

- String Along with Basie (Roulette, 1960)
- Half a Sixpence (Dot, 1967)

With Kenny Burrell

- Bluesin' Around (Columbia, 1962) – released 1983

With Joey DeFrancesco

- Where Were You? (Columbia, 1990)

With Modern Jazz Quartet

- MJQ & Friends: A 40th Anniversary Celebration (Atlantic, 1994)

With Buddy Rich

- The Last Blues Album Volume 1 (Groove Merchant, 1974)

With Sonny Stitt

- What's New!!! (Roulette, 1966)

With Buddy Tate

- Buddy Tate and His Buddies (Chiaroscuro, 1973)
