= Bill Jennings (guitarist) =

American jazz guitarist and composer (1919–1978)

- Born: September 12, 1919; Indianapolis, Indiana, U.S.
- Died: November 29, 1978 (aged 59) Indianapolis, Indiana, U.S.
- Genres: Jazz, R&B, soul jazz
- Occupation: Musician
- Instrument: Guitar
- Years active: 1954–1968
- Formerly of: Jack McDuff, Willis "Gator" Jackson, King Curtis, Louis Armstrong, Bill Doggett, Louis Jordan, Ella Fitzgerald

Bill Jennings (September 12, 1919 – November 29, 1978) was an American jazz guitarist and composer.

== Career ==
Recording as both a leader and a sideman, Jennings has been called "the architect of soul jazz" and has influenced on jazz, soul, R&B, and blues guitar. B.B. King often mentioned Jennings as one of his biggest influences. Jennings recorded with such artists as Willis "Gator" Jackson, Brother Jack McDuff, Leo Parker, Bill Doggett, Louis Jordan, King Curtis, Louis Armstrong, and Ella Fitzgerald and unique in his ability to play in many styles, including swing, bop, jump blues, R&B, and pop. Jennings played on "Fever" by Little Willie John, which made the Billboard R&B chart in the US and peaked at number 24 on the Billboard Hot 100.

A left-handed player, Jennings played guitar upside down, with the high strings at the top, which gave him a different approach to phrasing and bending the strings. Later in his career, he lost a finger on his fretting hand and began playing bass guitar.

== Death ==
Jennings died at Veterans Hospital in Indianapolis on November 29, 1978. He was a United States Navy veteran and a member of the Church of God. In 2023, the Killer Blues Headstone Project placed a headstone for Bill Jennings at Crown Hill Cemetery in Indianapolis.

== Discography ==
=== As leader ===
- Mood Indigo (King, 1956)
- Billy in the Lion's Den (King, 1957)
- Enough Said! (Prestige, 1959)
- Glide On (Prestige, 1960)

=== As sideman ===
With Willis Jackson

- Please Mr. Jackson (Prestige, 1959)
- Cookin' Sherry (Prestige, 1960)
- Blue Gator (Prestige, 1960)
- Thunderbird (Prestige, 1962)
- Together Again! (Prestige, 1965)
- Together Again, Again (Prestige, 1967)
- Star Bag (Prestige, 1968)
- Swivelhips (Prestige, 1969)
- Gator's Groove (Prestige, 1969)

With Brother Jack McDuff

- Brother Jack (Prestige, 1960)

With others

- Roy Brown, Laughing but Crying (Route 66, 1977)
- Kenny Burrell, Guitar Soul (Status 1965)
- The Charms, Glory Spots (Motherwit, 1991)
- Wild Bill Davis, Flying High (Everest, 1959)
- Bill Doggett, Moondust (Odeon 1959)
- Shakey Jake Harris, Good Times (Bluesville, 1960)
- Little Willie John, Fever (Regency, 1956)
- Etta Jones, The Jones Girl...Etta...Sings, Sings, Sings (King, 1958)
- Betty Roche, Singin' & Swingin' (Prestige, 1961)
