= Atomic Records =

Independent record label

Atomic Records was an independent record label based in Hollywood, California, which was founded in 1945 by trombonist Lyle Griffin. Among the notable recording artists on Atomic were Slim Gaillard, Barney Kessel and Griffin himself. In 1947, Griffin sold Atomic to A. W. Lungren, who became the new head and Griffin left the label. The label lasted until 1955.

== Roster ==
- Buzz Adlam & His Orchestra
- David Allyn
- The Baker Boys
- Chuck Cabot & His Orchestra
- Hugh Cameron
- Miss Danna
- Frank Davenport Quintette
- Esquire's All American New Star Winners
- Slim Gaillard Quartette
- Lyle Griffin Orchestra
- Mel Griggs & His Sons of the Saddle (released on Atomic's Western Series)
- Cee Pee Johnson, His Tom-Toms & His Orchestra
- Betty Hall Jones & Her Rhythm (released on Atomic's Rhythm Series)
- Barney Kessel's All Stars
- Ray Linn's Hollywood Swing Stars
- Dodo Marmarosa Trio
- Candy Morgan
- The Satellites w/Jack LaSalle
- Lucky Thompson
