= Sock! =

Studio album by Gene Ammons
- Released: 1965
- Recorded: November 26, 1954, November 4, 1955, April 13, 1962, and September 5, 1962
- Studio: Van Gelder Studio, Hackensack and Englewood Cliffs, New Jersey
- Genre: Jazz
- Label: Prestige; PR 7400

Gene Ammons chronology
Angel Eyes (1960–62)	Sock! (1965)	Bad! Bossa Nova (1962)

Professional ratings
Review scores
Source	Rating
AllMusic	1.5/5 stars
The Rolling Stone Jazz Record Guide	4/5 stars

Sock! is an album by saxophonist Gene Ammons compiling sessions recorded between 1954 and 1962 and released on the Prestige label in 1965.

== Reception ==
AllMusic awarded the album 1½ stars with its review by Scott Yanow stating: "Sock! is basically a mess. The ten brief songs are strung together with no thought given to sound or segues, and the material itself is pretty weak". The more modern tracks 1–3 are the best and can be found on the Stranger In Town CD.

== Track listing ==
1. "Blue Coolade" (Mal Waldron) – 4:11
2. "Short Stop" (Waldron) – 3:30
3. "They Say You're Laughing at Me" (Jerry Livingston) – 3:59
4. "Scam" (Gene Ammons) – 5:35
5. "Sock" (Ammons) – 2:45
6. "What I Say" – 2:45
7. "Count Your Blessings" (Richard Morgan, Edith Temple) – 4:15
8. "Cara Mia" (Lee Lange, Tulio Trapani) – 2:50
9. "Blues for Turfers" (Edwin Moore) – 3:45
10. "Rock Roll" (Chico O'Farrill) – 2:55
- Recorded at Van Gelder Studio in Hackensack, New Jersey on November 26, 1954 (tracks 5–8) and November 4, 1955 (tracks 9 & 10) and at Van Gelder Studio, Englewood Cliffs New Jersey on April 13, 1962 (track 4) and September 5, 1962 (tracks 1–3)

== Personnel ==
- Gene Ammons – tenor saxophone
- Nat Howard (tracks 5–8), Nat Woodyard (tracks 9, 10) – trumpet
- Henderson Chambers (tracks 5–8), Edwin Moore (tracks 9, 10) – trombone
- Gene Easton (tracks 5–8), Cecil Payne (tracks 9, 10) – baritone saxophone
- Patti Bown (track 4), John Houston (tracks 5–8), Mal Waldron (tracks 1–3), Lawrence Wheatley (tracks 9, 10) – piano
- George Duvivier (track 4), Wendell Marshall (tracks 1–3), Ernie Shapherd (tracks 9, 10), Ben Stuberville (tracks 5–8) – bass
- George Brown (tracks 5–10), Walter Perkins (track 4), Ed Thigpen (tracks 1–3) – drums
- Etta Jones – vocals (track 4)
