= Together Again for the Last Time =

Studio album by Sonny Stitt and Gene Ammons
- Released: 1976
- Recorded: November 20 & 21 and December 10, 1973; C.I. Studios, New York
- Genre: Jazz
- Length: 35:42
- Label: Prestige; P 10100
- Producer: Duke Pearson

Gene Ammons chronology
Gene Ammons in Sweden (1973)	Together Again for the Last Time (1976)	Brasswind (1973–74)

Sonny Stitt chronology
Left Bank Encores (1973)	Together Again for the Last Time (1973)	Satan (1974)

Professional ratings
Review scores
Source	Rating
Allmusic	4/5 stars
The Rolling Stone Jazz Record Guide	3/5 stars

Together Again for the Last Time is an album by saxophonists Sonny Stitt and Gene Ammons recorded in 1973 and released on the Prestige label in 1976. The album was the final recording by the pair, who had a long history of collaboration, prior to the death of Ammons in 1974.

== Reception ==
The Allmusic review stated "Their similar styles and combative approach made their musical encounters quite exciting and this Prestige LP, their last joint recording, has some strong trade-offs... this is a fine date that is recommended to fans of the two tenors".

== Track listing ==
All compositions by Gene Ammons except as indicated

1. "Saxification" - 4:38
2. "The More I See You" (Mack Gordon, Harry Warren) - 10:22
3. "The Window Pain" - 4:47
4. "I'll Close My Eyes" (Buddy Kaye, Billy Reid) - 5:06
5. "One for Amos" - 4:57
6. "For All We Know" (J. Fred Coots, Sam M. Lewis) - 5:52
- Recorded at C.I. Studios, New York on November 20, 1973 (track 4), November 21, 1973 (tracks 5 & 6) and December 10, 1973 (tracks 1–3)

== Personnel ==
- Gene Ammons - tenor saxophone (tracks 1–5)
- Sonny Stitt - tenor saxophone (tracks 1, 3, 5 & 6)
- Junior Mance - piano, electric piano
- Sam Jones - bass
- Ajaramu J. Shelton (tracks 1–3), Mickey Roker (tracks 4–6) - drums
- Warren Smith - percussion (tracks 1–3)
