= The Big Sound =

The Big Sound may refer to:

- The Big Sound (Johnny Hodges album), 1957
- The Big Sound (Gene Ammons album), 1958
- Simon Dupree and the Big Sound, a 1960s Scottish band

== See also ==
- Big Sound, a 2000–2001 Canadian television sitcom
- Bigsound, an annual three-day music conference, industry showcase, and festival in Brisbane, Australia
