= The Soulful Moods of Gene Ammons =

Studio album by Gene Ammons
- Released: 1963
- Recorded: April 14, 1962
- Studio: Van Gelder Studio, Englewood Cliffs, NJ
- Genre: Jazz
- Label: Moodsville; MV 28

Gene Ammons chronology
Late Hour Special (1961–62)	The Soulful Moods of Gene Ammons (1963)	Blue Groove (1962)

Professional ratings
Review scores
Source	Rating
Allmusic	3/5 stars
Down Beat	3/5 stars

The Soulful Moods of Gene Ammons is an album by saxophonist Gene Ammons recorded in 1962 and released on the Moodsville label.

== Reception ==
The Allmusic review stated "A companion to Gene Ammons' other release on Moodsville, 1961's Nice an' Cool, 1963's Soulful Moods of Gene Ammons picks a slightly less familiar batch of ballads... Ammons himself is typically excellent: few tenors in the '60s had his way with a ballad".

== Track listing ==
1. "Two Different Worlds" (Al Frisch, Sid Wayne) - 4:53
2. "But Beautiful" (Johnny Burke, Jimmy Van Heusen) - 4:27
3. "Skylark" (Hoagy Carmichael, Johnny Mercer) - 6:19
4. "Three Little Words" (Bert Kalmar, Harry Ruby) - 3:49
5. "Street of Dreams" (Sam M. Lewis, Victor Young) - 3:09
6. "You'd Be So Nice to Come Home To" (Cole Porter) - 4:17
7. "Under a Blanket of Blue" (Jerry Livingston, Al J. Neiburg, Marty Symes) - 5:12
8. "I'm Glad There Is You" (Jimmy Dorsey, Paul Mertz) - 6:02

== Personnel ==
- Gene Ammons - tenor saxophone
- Patti Bown - piano
- George Duvivier - bass
- Ed Shaughnessy - drums
