= Count Your Blessings (disambiguation) =

Count Your Blessings is the 2006 debut album by Bring Me the Horizon.

Count Your Blessings may also refer to:

== Music ==
- Count Your Blessings (compilation album), a 1994 Christmas compilation album
- Count Your Blessings | Repented, the 2026 20th-anniversary re-recording of the Bring Me the Horizon album
- "Count Your Blessings" (hymn), a Christian hymn by Johnson Oatman, Jr.
- "Count Your Blessings" (Richard Morgan & Edith Temple song), 1946
- "Count Your Blessings (Instead of Sheep)", a popular song written by Irving Berlin in 1954

== Films ==
- Count Your Blessings (1959 film), a drama starring Deborah Kerr
- Count Your Blessings (1987 film), a Dutch film by Pieter Verhoeff

== Literature ==
- Count Your Blessings (play), a 1951 comedy play by Ronald Jeans

== See also ==
- "Count Your Blessings, Woman", a 1968 song by country artist Jan Howard
