= Norman Edge =

American jazz musician (1934–2020)

- Born: April 29, 1934; Jersey City, New Jersey, U.S.
- Died: June 4, 2018 (aged 84); Metuchen, New Jersey, U.S.
- Genres: Jazz
- Occupation: Musician
- Instrument: Double bass
- Years active: 1958–2002

Norman Edge (April 29, 1934 – June 4, 2018) was an American jazz musician who played the double bass.

== Life and work ==
Edge played in a military band during his military service and then served for several years in the National Guard. During this time, he played with the pianist Morris Nanton, with whom he recorded the album Flower Drum Song (Warner Bros., with Osie Johnson) in 1958 and worked together regularly over the next 50 years, producing several albums, such as Preface (1964), Something We've Got (1965) and Soul Fingers (1966). He is also on albums by Gene Ammons (Bad! Bossa Nova, 1962), The Manhattan Brass Choir (ABC-Paramount, 1967, with Clark Terry and Urbie Green) and in albums with Sandy Sasso and Nelson Riddle. Edge taught in public schools in Edison, New Jersey and gave private lessons, along with playing in orchestras and jazz bands. In the field of jazz, he was involved in eleven recording sessions between 1958 and 2002. Edge last lived in Metuchen, New Jersey.
