= Eddie Williams (saxophonist) =

American jazz musician

Eddie Williams was an American jazz saxophonist.

Williams played with Claude Williams early in the 1930s and worked with Tiny Bradshaw at the Savoy Ballroom in the middle of the decade. He played with the Mills Blue Rhythm Band (1937), Billy Kyle (1937), Don Redman (1939), Jelly Roll Morton (1940), Lucky Millinder (1940–41), Ella Fitzgerald (1941), Red Allen and Chris Columbus (1942), Wilbur De Paris, Redman again, Cliff Jackson, and James P. Johnson (1944). He recorded in California with Garvin Bushell in 1944, then served in the military during 1945–46, when he played in Europe. In the 1960s he was a member of Happy Caldwell's band. He lived on Striver's Row.

== Discography ==
=== As sideman ===
- Earl Coleman, Manhattan Serenade (1968)
- Bennie Green, The 45 Session (Blue Note, 1959)
- Bennie Green, Walkin' & Talkin' (Blue Note, 1959)
- Pee Wee Russell and Oliver Nelson, The Spirit of '67 (Impulse!, 1967)
- John Wright, Makin' Out (Prestige, 1961)
