= Night Lights (Gene Ammons album) =

Studio album by Gene Ammons
- Released: 1985
- Recorded: February 2, 1970
- Studio: Van Gelder Studio, Englewood Cliffs, New Jersey
- Genre: Jazz
- Label: Prestige; PR 7862

Gene Ammons chronology
Brother Jug! (1969)	Night Lights (1985)	The Chase! (1970)

Professional ratings
Review scores
Source	Rating
AllMusic	3/5 stars

Night Lights is an album by saxophonist Gene Ammons recorded in 1970 and released on the Prestige label.

== Reception ==
AllMusic awarded the album 3 stars with its review by Scott Yanow stating, "One of his first recording sessions after he returned to the scene following a rather severe jail sentence was this tribute to Nat King Cole... was quickly forgotten as Ammons recorded some more commercial material and this set was not released for the first time until 1985. Ammons is in excellent form".

== Track listing ==
1. "Lush Life" (Billy Strayhorn) – 5:58
2. "The Christmas Song" (Mel Tormé, Robert Wells) – 5:57
3. "Nature Boy" (Eden Ahbez) – 8:14
4. "Night Lights" (Chester Conn, Sammy Gallop) – 5:22
5. "Sweet Lorraine" (Cliff Burwell, Mitchell Parish)
6. "Calypso Blues" (Nat King Cole, Don George) – 5:41

== Personnel ==
- Gene Ammons – tenor saxophone
- Wynton Kelly – piano
- George Duvivier – bass
- Rudy Collins – drums
- Pucho – congas (track 6)
