= Bad! Bossa Nova =

Studio album by Gene Ammons
- Released: 1962
- Recorded: September 9, 1962
- Studio: Van Gelder Studio, Englewood Cliffs, New Jersey
- Genre: Jazz
- Length: 34:17
- Label: Prestige; PR 7257
- Producer: Ozzie Cadena

Gene Ammons chronology
Sock! (1965)	Bad! Bossa Nova (1962)	The Boss Is Back! (1969)

Professional ratings
Review scores
Source	Rating
Allmusic	3/5 stars
The Penguin Guide to Jazz Recordings	2.5/4 stars

Bad! Bossa Nova is an album by saxophonist Gene Ammons recorded in 1962 and released on the Prestige label. It was also re-released as Jungle Soul! (Ca' Purange). It was his first charting album, it peaked at No. 53 on the Billboard Top LPs, during a seventeen-week run on the chart.

== Reception ==
The AllMusic review by Scott Yanow stated" "This was Ammons' final recording before 'being made an example of' and getting a lengthy jail sentence for possession of heroin; his next record would be cut over seven years later... The music is offbeat if not all that memorable, a decent effort but not essential".

== Track listing ==
1. "Pagan Love Song" (Nacio Herb Brown, Arthur Freed) – 4:45
2. "Ca' Purange (Jungle Soul)" (Natalicio Moreira Lima) – 9:35
3. "Anna" (Vatro – Giordano – Engvick) 3:20
4. "Cae, Cae" (Roberto Martins) – 3:46
5. "Moito Mato Grosso" (Gene Ammons) – 7:44
6. "Yellow Bird" (Alan Bergman, Marilyn Keith, Norman Luboff) – 5:07

== Personnel ==
- Gene Ammons – tenor saxophone
- Hank Jones – piano
- Kenny Burrell, Bucky Pizzarelli – guitar
- Norman Edge – bass
- Oliver Jackson – drums
- Al Hayes – bongos

== Charts ==
Chart (1962)	Peak position
US Billboard Top LPs	53
