= Back on the Scene =

Studio album by Bennie Green
- Released: 1958
- Recorded: March 23, 1958
- Studio: Van Gelder Studio; Hackensack, NJ
- Genre: Jazz
- Length: 37:38
- Label: Blue Note; BLP 1587

Bennie Green chronology
| Walking Down (1956) | Back on the Scene (1958) | Soul Stirrin' (1958) |

Back on the Scene is an album by American jazz trombonist Bennie Green recorded on March 23, 1958 and released on Blue Note later that year.

== Reception ==
Professional ratings
Review scores
| Source | Rating |
|---|---|
| AllMusic | 3/5 stars |

The AllMusic review by Stephen Thomas Erlewine states:

It's evident from the opening pair of Latin-flavored performances that Back on the Scene is one of Bennie Green's most diverse efforts. Green's warm, supple tone and fondness for swinging, bop-influenced mainstream jazz and jump blues hasn't disappeared; he's just found new facets in his style.... Even with this vast array of styles, Back on the Scene retains all the good-natured spirit and humor of his earlier Prestige albums.

== Track listing ==
Side 1
| No. | Title | Writer(s) | Length |
|---|---|---|---|
| 1. | "I Love You" | Cole Porter | 6:08 |
| 2. | "Melba's Mood" | Melba Liston | 5:35 |
| 3. | "Just Friends" | John Klenner; Sam M. Lewis | 7:03 |

Side 2
| No. | Title | Writer(s) | Length |
|---|---|---|---|
| 1. | "You're Mine, You" | Johnny Green; Edward Heyman | 5:18 |
| 2. | "Bennie Plays the Blues" | Bennie Green | 8:25 |
| 3. | "Green Street" | Liston | 5:09 |

== Personnel ==
=== Musicians ===
- Bennie Green – trombone
- Charlie Rouse – tenor saxophone
- Joe Knight – piano
- George Tucker – bass
- Louis Hayes – drums

=== Technical personnel ===
- Alfred Lion – producer
- Rudy Van Gelder – recording engineer
- Francis Wolff – photography
- Leonard Feather – liner notes
