= Jug (album) =

Studio album by Gene Ammons
- Released: 1961
- Recorded: January 27, 1961; Van Gelder Studio, Englewood Cliffs, New Jersey
- Genre: Jazz
- Length: 36:54
- Label: Prestige; PRLP 7192
- Producer: Esmond Edwards

Gene Ammons chronology
| Nice an' Cool (1961) | Jug (1961) | Groovin' with Jug (1961) |

Professional ratings
Review scores
| Source | Rating |
|---|---|
| Allmusic | 3/5 stars |
| The Rolling Stone Jazz Record Guide | 3/5 stars |
| The Penguin Guide to Jazz Recordings | 3/4 stars |

Jug is an album by saxophonist Gene Ammons recorded in 1961 and released on the Prestige label.

== Reception ==
The AllMusic review by Scott Yanow stated: "Jug finds the great tenor in excellent form... Few surprises occur, but fans will not be disappointed by his soulful and lyrical playing".

== Track listing ==
All compositions by Gene Ammons, except as indicated

1. "Ol' Man River" (Oscar Hammerstein II, Jerome Kern) - 5:11
2. "Easy to Love" (Cole Porter) - 4:14
3. "Seed Shack" - 5:39
4. "Let It Be You" (Clarence Anderson) - 3:48
5. "Exactly Like You" (Dorothy Fields, Jimmy McHugh) - 5:59
6. "Miss Lucy" - 3:42
7. "Namely You" (Gene DePaul, Johnny Mercer) - 4:45
8. "Tangerine" (Mercer, Victor Schertzinger) - 3:36

== Personnel ==
- Gene Ammons - tenor saxophone
- Richard Wyands - piano (tracks 1, 2, 3, 5, 6, and 8)
- Clarence "Sleepy" Anderson - organ (track 7), piano (track 3)
- Doug Watkins - bass
- J.C. Heard - drums
- Ray Barretto - congas
