= Dodo Marmarosa =

American jazz pianist and composer (1925–2002)

Background information
- Born: Michael Marmarosa; December 12, 1925; Pittsburgh, Pennsylvania, U.S.
- Died: September 17, 2002 (aged 76) Pittsburgh, Pennsylvania, U.S.
- Genres: Jazz, bebop
- Occupations: Musician, composer, arranger
- Instrument: Piano
- Years active: Early 1940s–early 1970s?
- Labels: Atomic, Dial, Savoy, Argo, Uptown

Michael "Dodo" Marmarosa (December 12, 1925 – September 17, 2002) was an American jazz pianist, composer, and arranger.

Originating in Pittsburgh, Pennsylvania, Marmarosa became a professional musician in his mid-teens, and toured with several major big bands, including those led by Tommy Dorsey, Gene Krupa, and Artie Shaw into the mid-1940s. He moved to Los Angeles in 1945, where he became increasingly interested and involved in the emerging bebop scene. During his time on the West Coast, he recorded in small groups with leading bebop and swing musicians, including Howard McGhee, Charlie Parker, and Lester Young, as well as leading his own bands.

Marmarosa returned to Pittsburgh for health reasons in 1948. He began performing much less frequently, and had a presence only locally for around a decade. Friends and fellow musicians had commented from an early stage that Marmarosa was an unusual character. His mental stability was probably affected by being beaten into a coma when in his teens, by a short-lived marriage followed by permanent separation from his children, and by a traumatic period in the army. He made comeback recordings in the early 1960s, but soon retreated to Pittsburgh, where he played occasionally into the early 1970s. From then until his death three decades later, he lived with family and in veterans' hospitals.

== Early life ==
Marmarosa was born in Pittsburgh, Pennsylvania on December 12, 1925. He had "Italian working-class parents" – Joseph and Carmella. He was the middle of three children, between sisters Audrey and Doris, and grew up in the East Liberty neighborhood of Pittsburgh. Marmarosa attended Peabody High School. He received the uncomplimentary nickname "Dodo" as a child because of his large head, short body, and bird-like nose.

Although he had stated an interest in playing the trumpet, Marmarosa's parents persuaded him to take up the piano, which he began at the age of nine. He received classical music lessons, but was influenced by the jazz playing of Art Tatum, Teddy Wilson, and others after fellow pianist Erroll Garner, four years Marmarosa's elder, introduced him to their music. Marmarosa practiced a lot, until his left and right hands were equally strong.

== Later life and career ==
=== 1941–50 ===
Marmarosa began his professional career around 1941, joining the Johnnie "Scat" Davis orchestra at the age of 15 or 16. He was first mentioned in the national jazz press the following year, appearing in DownBeat magazine for his playing at a jam session. After touring, the Davis orchestra disbanded, so Marmarosa and others then joined Gene Krupa around the end of 1942. After one 1943 Krupa performance in Philadelphia, Marmarosa was beaten into a coma by sailors who accused him of draft dodging. According to clarinetist Buddy DeFranco, who was also attacked by the men, "Dodo was always a little off but he seemed different after that beating. The head injury didn't affect his playing, but I think it created psychological problems for him."

After Krupa's orchestra broke up in the middle of 1943, Marmarosa played in Ted Fio Rito's band for at least a month that summer. He then moved to Charlie Barnet's big band, where he stayed from October 1943 to March 1944. Marmarosa's recording debut was with Barnet in 1943; they recorded "The Moose", a track described by Gunther Schuller as "a veritable masterpiece" on which the 17-year-old pianist played an original blend of nascent bebop and Count Basie-style minimalism. Marmarosa recorded some trio tracks with Krupa and DeFranco in 1944. From April to October of that year he was with Tommy Dorsey, including for the orchestra's appearance in the MGM film Thrill of a Romance. A Dorsey biographer indicated that the pianist was dismissed because the bandleader did not care for the modernistic facets of his playing. Marmarosa soon joined clarinetist Artie Shaw, with whom he stayed until November 1945, as part of a big band and Shaw's small band, the Gramercy Five.

From the early 1940s Marmarosa had searched for and experimented with advanced progressive forms of jazz, and had become increasingly attracted to bebop after meeting and jamming with the leaders of that new movement, Dizzy Gillespie and Charlie Parker. In 1945 Marmarosa moved to Los Angeles. He was pianist in March of the following year for Parker's first recordings for Dial Records. Two of the tracks recorded, "Ornithology" and "Yardbird Suite", have been included in the Grammy Hall of Fame.

Marmarosa recorded extensively as a sideman in the period 1945–47, in both bebop and swing contexts. Leaders of these sessions included Wardell Gray, Lionel Hampton, Mel Tormé, Willie Smith, Lester Young, and, with Marmarosa as house pianist for Atomic Records, Slim Gaillard and Barney Kessel. With a few exceptions, however, Marmarosa only rarely played in public with the leaders whose studio recordings he appeared on during his time on the West Coast. Between the frequent recording sessions, he played "in big bands (especially Boyd Raeburn and Tommy Pederson), at jazz concerts, as a soloist in nightclubs [...] or jamming after hours." Raeburn's orchestra was a progressive group that used "modern arrangements seeking to bridge the gap between bop and advanced European music".

Marmarosa made his first recordings as leader in 1946, with trio tracks that included Ray Brown on bass and Jackie Mills on drums, and in a quartet with saxophonist Lucky Thompson added. He also recorded his only vocal track, "I've Got News for You", in the same year. In 1947, Marmarosa led a trio session for Dial with Harry Babasin on cello and Jackie Mills on drums; these were the first pizzicato jazz cello recordings. In the same year, Marmarosa featured in some of Gene Norman's Just Jazz concerts, and was given Esquire magazine's New Star (piano) award.

According to Mills, his housemate in 1946–47: "Dodo was the most dedicated of players. He practiced an incredible amount of hours, often all day long. He wouldn't stop to eat. He would eat at the piano with one hand and keep playing with the other. He had no other interests that I was aware of. He could play forever." At this time, Marmarosa did not drink or take hard drugs, but his behavior was often eccentric. Mills reported that "Dodo was just a big kid [...] He never really grew up because he never allowed anything but the piano to be important to him. The piano was his life. He heard things in his head that he wasn't able to play and it frustrated him. Once, he got mad at the old upright piano we had and chopped it up with an axe."

In the spring of 1948, Marmarosa returned to Pittsburgh because of illness. He toured again with "Scat" Davis (April – July 1949) and Shaw (September – November 1949). He left Shaw's band for the final time during one concert after they had twice played Shaw's hit, "Frenesí", Marmarosa had threatened to leave if Shaw called for it again, and the leader had done so after the audience requested a third playing. Shaw reported that Marmarosa "was gentle and fragile, [...and] never learned to deal with the world of a musician." The pianist returned to Pittsburgh in 1950, signed "a term contract" with Savoy Records, and recorded four trio sides for them in July, but the quality did not match his earlier playing.

=== 1951–59 ===
For around a decade, Marmarosa was much less active as a musician. Shaw and DeFranco raised the idea of psychiatric treatment, but the former was rebuffed by Marmarosa himself, and the latter by the pianist's parents: "They were not reconciled to his needing professional help. They were from the old school, they saw it as a stigma. I got into a big argument about it with his father. He really blew up."

In 1952, two years after marrying, Marmarosa moved with his wife and their two daughters to California. The marriage was short lived, and he again returned to his parents' home in Pittsburgh in the fall of that year. His ex-wife remarried and asked him to allow her to change the children's names in exchange for not having to pay her any more money; following the advice of his parents, he signed the documents. A friend of his later stated that never seeing his children again "was the great blight of his life. It tore him apart". Another friend commented more generally that, "After the marriage broke up, he seemed to lose the spark, the drive he once had".

A tour of a few months in Charlie Spivak's band in 1953 preceded Marmarosa being drafted into the army the following year. This exacerbated his problems: several months in a Veteran Administration hospital preceded his discharge, at which point he was in a poor psychological condition. Back in Pittsburgh, where he played locally from March 1956, Marmarosa continued to be erratic, sometimes disappearing for weeks at a time, and giving his money away: "It was like he was on the road to self-destruction", commented trumpeter Danny Conn. Amateur recordings from the pianist's concerts in Pittsburgh in 1958 were released four decades later by Uptown Records.

=== 1960–2002 ===
Marmarosa departed for California by car in 1960, but problems with the vehicle halted him in Chicago. Promoter Joe Segal organized an Argo Records session for him there, but Marmarosa departed suddenly and the recording was delayed until the following year. The resultant trio music from two days in May was released as Dodo's Back! in 1962. Leonard Feather described it as "required listening for anyone with a serious interest in the history of modern jazz piano", but it failed to gain Marmarosa more than a brief resurgence of interest. He made his final studio recordings in 1962. One album from these, Jug & Dodo, contained trio and quartet tracks, with saxophonist Gene Ammons; it was released on Prestige Records more than a decade later. The other, in a quartet with trumpeter Bill Hardman, was released in 1988. Segal commented that Marmarosa "didn't talk much, was very mild-mannered. He just drank an awful lot, shot and a beer all day long. It would've put nine out of ten people under the table, but he was still walking around." The pianist shuttled between Chicago and Pittsburgh for a time, then settled again in the latter.

Marmarosa continued to perform in Pittsburgh, albeit irregularly. Around 1963, DeFranco dropped by; he recalled that the pianist "would play brilliantly for half a tune, then just stop and walk away. He didn't even know who I was". Marmarosa's last performance in public has been dated variously as occurring in 1968 or the early-to-mid 1970s. Diabetes contributed to his permanent retirement. "Even the resurgence of interest in bebop in the 1970s and 80s did not bring him back to national attention", reported The New York Times.

For the rest of his life, Marmarosa alternated between living with his sister Doris' family and in a veterans' hospital, both in the Pittsburgh area. Some of his friends blamed Marmarosa's family for keeping him in their home because of shame about his mental problems, and suggested that the family blamed musicians and music for his instability. Marmarosa himself did not explain his withdrawal from performing. Irritated by telephone calls from a fan seeking an interview in 1992, Marmarosa passed on the news that he had died; this led to premature obituaries being published in two British newspapers. He sometimes played piano in the family's basement or for other residents at the hospital. His mother died in 1995, after his father. Marmarosa died of a heart attack on September 17, 2002, in a veterans' hospital in Pittsburgh. He was survived by his two sisters.

== Playing style and influence ==
Pianist Dick Katz wrote that, "In the opinion of many, Dodo Marmarosa was the most gifted of all the pianists who figured in the bebop saga. Blessed with a beautiful legato touch and a fluid technique, he developed an original style, which [...] blended perfectly with the bop idiom, as well as with earlier styles. He combined advanced chordal and scalar elements with graceful rhythmic phrasing."

In some of his 1944 playing, Marmarosa was progressively bebop-directed, employing melodies derived from the harmony and varying the rhythmic positioning of accents; soon after, he added more space to his playing, using shorter sequences of notes than typical in bebop. Jazz critic Marc Myers, in comparing Marmarosa with other pianists of the early bebop period, observed that he was less aggressive than Bud Powell, and more expressive and complex than Al Haig, and that he "had a punctuating, full-keyboard approach, developing ideas in the middle and widening out to express them."

Critic and musician Brian Priestley wrote that "What was so distinctive about Dodo's work was partly his harmonic sense and knowledge of the additional notes [...in bebop.] Many pianists were trying to find ways to voice these satisfactorily in full chording, but none did so as pleasingly or as fluently as Marmarosa. Partly it was also the way he alternated between employing his hands together and in opposition to each other, and allied to this was his unusual time feeling."

By the time of his 1960s recordings, Marmarosa had a more relaxed playing style. Biographers commented that "his even, classically derived articulation had given way to a more rhythmically pronounced, jazz-oriented playing, and, above all, his musical personality seemed still more determined and coherent."

Pianist Cecil Taylor commented in 1961: "The first modern pianist who made any impression on me was Dodo Marmarosa, with Charlie Barnet." Marmarosa also encouraged DeFranco to take up bebop.

== Discography ==
Compilations of previously released material, and recordings from or for radio broadcasts, are not listed.

=== Albums as leader/co-leader ===
Year recorded	Title	Label	Notes
1958–62	Pittsburgh 1958	Uptown	Most tracks trio, with Danny Mastri and Johnny Vance (bass; separately), Henry Sciullo and Chuck Spatafore (drums; separately); some tracks quintet, with Danny Conn (trumpet), Carlo Galluzzo (tenor sax), Jimmy DeJulio (bass), Spatafore (drums); all in concert; some tracks quintet, with Conn (trumpet), Buzzy Renn (alto sax), DeJulio (bass), Spatafore (drums); released 1997
1961	Dodo's Back!	Argo	Trio, with Richard Evans (bass), Marshall Thompson (drums)
1962	Jug & Dodo	Prestige	Most tracks quartet, with Gene Ammons (tenor sax), Sam Jones (bass), Marshall Thompson (drums); some tracks trio, without Ammons
1962	The Chicago Sessions	Argo	Quartet, with Bill Hardman (trumpet), Richard Evans (bass), Ben Dixon (drums); released 1988, combined with reissue of Dodo's Back!

=== Albums as sideman ===
Year recorded	Leader	Title	Label	Notes
1960	Johnny Janis	Jazz Up Your Life	Starwell	Released 2006

=== Singles as leader/co-leader ===
Year recorded	Title	Label	Notes
1946	"Mellow Mood"/"How High the Moon"	Atomic	"Mellow Mood": trio, with Ray Brown (bass), Jackie Mills (drums); "How High the Moon": quartet, with Lucky Thompson (tenor sax) added
1946	"I Surrender Dear"/"Dodo's Blues"	Atomic	"Dodo's Blues": trio, with Ray Brown (bass), Jackie Mills (drums); "I Surrender Dear": quartet, with Lucky Thompson (tenor sax) added
1946	"Raindrops"/"I've Got News for You"	Atomic	Trio, with Barney Kessel (guitar), Gene Englund (bass)
1947	"Lover"/"Dary Departs", "Trade Winds"/"Bopmatism"	Dial	Trio, with Harry Babasin (bass, cello), Jackie Mills (drums)
1950	"My Foolish Heart"/"Why Was I Born?", "Blue Room"/"The Night Is Young"	Savoy	Trio, with Thomas Mandrus (bass), Joe "Jazz" Wallace (drums)

=== Singles as sideman ===
Tracks recorded but not released as singles are not listed.

Year recorded	Leader	Title	Label
1943	Charlie Barnet	"The Moose", "Pow-Wow", "Sittin' Home Waitin' for You", "Strollin'"	Decca
1944	Charlie Barnet	"Bakiff", "West End Blues", "In There", "Saltin' Away My Sweet Dreams", "Baby Won't You Please Come Home", "The Great Lie", "The Jeep Is Jumpin'", "Blue Moon", "In a Mellotone", "My Heart Isn't in It", "Drop Me Off in Harlem", "Gulf Coast Blues", "Flat Top Flips His Lid", "Skyliner", Sharecroppin' Blues", "Come Out, Come Out, Wherever You Are"	Decca
1944	Gene Krupa	"Hodge Podge", "Liza"	V-Disc
1944	Tommy Dorsey	"You Brought a New Kind of Love to Me", "Opus One", "Swing High"	Lang-Worth
1944	Tommy Dorsey	"For All We Know", "I'm Nobody's Baby"	V-Disc
1944	Artie Shaw	"Ac-cent-tchu-ate the Positive", "Lady Day", "Jumpin' on the Merry-Go-Round"	RCA-Victor
1945	Artie Shaw	"I'll Never Be the Same", "Can't Help Lovin' Dat Man", "'S Wonderful", "Bedford Drive", "The Grabtown Grapple", "September Song", "But Not for Me", "Summertime", "Easy to Love", "Time on My Hands", "Tabu", "A Foggy Day", "These Foolish Things", "I Could Write a Book", "Thrill of a Lifetime", "Kasbah", "Lament", "(My) Lucky Number", "Love Walked In", "Soon", "Keepin' Myself for You", "No One But You", "Natch", "That's for Me", "They Can't Take That Away from Me", "Our Love Is Here to Stay", "I Was Doing All Right", "Someone to Watch Over Me", "Things Are Looking Up", "The Maid with the Flaccid Air", "They Didn't Believe Me", "Dancing on the Ceiling", "I Can't Get Started", "Just Floatin' Along", "Yolanda", "I Can't Escape from You", "Scuttlebutt", "The Gentle Grifter", "Mysterioso", "Hop, Skip and Jump"	RCA-Victor
1945	Artie Shaw	"Let's Walk", "Love of My Life", "Ghost of a Chance", "How Deep Is the Ocean", "The Glider", "The Hornet"	Musicraft
1945	Corky Corcoran	"What Is This Thing Called Love", "Minor Blues", "You Know It"	Keynote
1945	Lem Davis	"Nothin' from Nothin'", "My Blue Heaven"	Sunset
1945	Gladys Hampton	"Four Squares Only", "Star Time"	Hamp-Tone
1945	Slim Gaillard	"Laguna", "Dunkin' Bagel", "Boogin' at Berg's", "Don't Blame Me"	Bee-Bee
1945	Slim Gaillard	"Atomic Cocktail", "Yep-Roc Heresay", "Penicillin Boogie", "Jumpin' at the Record Shop", "Drei Six Cents", "Minuet in Vout", "Tee Say Malee"	Atomic
1945	Slim Gaillard	"Baby Won't You Please Come Home", "Groove Juice Jive", "The Hop", "Three Handed Boogie"	Cadet
1945	Slim Gaillard	"Dizzy Boogie", "Flat Foot Floogie", "Popity Pop", "Slim's Jam"	Bel-Tone
1945	Barney Kessel	"Atom Buster", "What Is This Thing Called Love", "Slick Chick", "The Man I Love"	Atomic
1945	Lester Young	"D.B. Blues", "Lester Blows Again", "These Foolish Things", "Jumpin' at Mesner's"	Philo
1946	Slim Gaillard	"Chicken Rhythm", "Santa Monica Jump", "Mean Pretty Mama", "School Kids Hop"	Bel-Tone
1946	Slim Gaillard	"Ya Ha Ha", "Carne", "Ding Dong Oreneey", "Buck Dance Rhythm"	Four Star
1946	Charlie Parker	"A Night in Tunisia", "Ornithology", "Yardbird Suite", "Moose the Mooche"	Dial
1946	Boyd Raeburn	"Boyd Meets Stravinsky"	Jewell
1946	Ella Mae Morse	"That's My Home"	Capitol
1946	Artie Shaw	"Changing My Tune", "For You, for Me, for Evermore", "And So to Bed", "Connecticut", "Don't You Believe It, Dear", "It's the Same Old Dream", "I Believe", "When You're Around"	Musicraft
1946	Mel Tormé	"One for My Baby", "A Little Kiss Each Morning", "Dream Awhile", "There's No Business Like Show Business", "It's Dreamtime", "You're Driving Me Crazy!", "Who Cares What People Say", "I'm Yours"	Musicraft
1946	Howard McGhee	"Midnight at Minton's", "Dialated Pupils", "High Wind in Hollywood", "Up in Dodo's Room"	Dial
1946	Lyle Griffin	"Flight of the Vout Bug", "Deep in the Blues", "It Shouldn't Happen", "Big Chief Albuquerque"	Atomic
1946	Wardell Gray	"Dell's Bells", "One for Prez", "The Man I Love", "Easy Swing"	Sunset (released by Jazz Selection)
1947	Charlie Parker	"Relaxin' at Camarillo", "Cheers", "Carvin' the Bird", "Stupendous"	Dial
1947	Lucky Thompson	"Just One More Chance", "From Dixieland to Be-Bop", "Boulevard Bounce", "Boppin' the Blues"	RCA-Victor
1947	Lucky Thompson	"Dodo's Bounce", "Dodo's Lament", "Slam's Mishap", "Schuffle That Ruff", "Smooth Sailing", "Commercial Eyes"	Downbeat
1947	Slim Gaillard	"Momma's in the Kitchen", "(I Don't Stand) A Ghost of a Chance", "Little Red Riding Wood", "Puerto Vootie", "Down by the Station", "Communications", "Three Little Words"	MGM
1947	Lionel Hampton	"Cherokee", "Re-bop and Be-bop", "Zoo-Baba-Da-Oo-Ee"	Decca
1947	Willie Smith	"Not So Bop Blues", "Tea for Two"	Mercury
1947	Red Norvo	"Bop"	Capitol
1947	Miss Danna	"Black and Blue", "Remember I Knew You When"	IRRA

Main sources:

== Filmography ==
- Thrill of a Romance (made 1944; released 1945)
