= Brother Jug! =

Studio album by Gene Ammons
- Released: 1970
- Recorded: November 10–11, 1969
- Studio: Van Gelder Studio, Englewood Cliffs, New Jersey
- Genre: Jazz
- Length: 33:42
- Label: Prestige; PR 7792
- Producer: Bob Porter

Gene Ammons chronology
| The Boss Is Back! (1969) | Brother Jug! (1970) | Night Lights (1970) |

Professional ratings
Review scores
| Source | Rating |
|---|---|
| AllMusic | 3/5 stars |
| The Rolling Stone Jazz Record Guide | 3/5 stars |

Brother Jug! is an album by saxophonist Gene Ammons recorded in 1969 and released on the Prestige label. It contains material from the same two dates as The Boss Is Back! (1969).

== Reception ==
AllMusic awarded the album 3 stars with its review by Stewart Mason stating, "A swinging soul-jazz set from just before the point where soul-jazz turned once and for all into fusion, 1970's Brother Jug is very much an album of its time... while the album doesn't have the classic timelessness of Gene Ammons' best '50s and early-'60s work, Brother Jug is one of Ammons' better albums released soon after the tenor saxophonist's release from a seven-year prison sentence".

"Jungle Strut" was covered by Santana in the 1971 album Santana III.

== Track listing ==
All compositions by Gene Ammons except where noted.

1. "Son of a Preacher Man" (John Hurley, Ronnie Wilkins) – 4:27
2. "Didn't We" (Jimmy Webb) – 6:04
3. "He's a Real Gone Guy" (Nellie Lutcher) – 5:05
4. "Jungle Strut" – 5:11
5. "Blue Velvet" (Lee Morris, Bernie Wayne) – 4:06
6. "Ger-Ru" – 8:49
- Recorded at Van Gelder Studio in Englewood Cliffs, New Jersey on November 10 (track 6) and November 11 (tracks 1–5), 1969

== Personnel ==
- Gene Ammons – tenor saxophone
- Sonny Phillips – organ (tracks 1–5)
- Junior Mance – piano (track 6)
- Billy Butler – guitar (tracks 1, 4)
- Bob Bushnell – electric bass (tracks 1–5)
- Buster Williams – bass (track 6)
- Frankie Jones (track 6), Bernard Purdie (tracks 1–5) – drums
- Candido – congas (track 6)
