= Boss Soul! =

1961 album by saxophonist Gene Ammons

Studio album by Gene Ammons
- Released: 1963
- Recorded: October 17–18, 1961
- Studio: Van Gelder Studio, Englewood Cliffs, New Jersey
- Genre: Jazz
- Label: Prestige; PR 7445
- Producer: Esmond Edwards

Gene Ammons chronology
| Up Tight! (1961) | Boss Soul! (1963) | Twisting the Jug (1961) |

Professional ratings
Review scores
| Source | Rating |
|---|---|
| Allmusic | 3/5 stars |

Boss Soul! is an album by saxophonist Gene Ammons recorded in 1961 and released on the Prestige label. The album was recorded at the same sessions that produced Up Tight!.

== Reception ==
Allmusic awarded the album 3 stars with its review by Stewart Mason stating, "Boss Soul is not a top-drawer Gene Ammons release, but it's thoroughly enjoyable throughout".

== Track listing ==
All compositions by Gene Ammons except where noted.

1. "Soft Summer Breeze" (Eddie Heywood, J. Spencer) – 4:50
2. "Don't Go to Strangers" (Redd Evans, Arthur Kent, Dave Mann) – 6:23
3. "Song of the Islands" (Charles E. King) – 5:10
4. "Travelin'" (Kenny Burrell) – 3:40
5. "Carbow" – 6:05
6. "(I'm Afraid) The Masquerade Is Over" (Herbert Magidson, Allie Wrubel) – 6:00
7. "I'm Beginning to See the Light" (Duke Ellington, Don George, Johnny Hodges, Harry James) – 4:45

Note

- Recorded at Van Gelder Studios in Englewood Cliffs, New Jersey on October 17, 1961 (tracks 5–7) and October 18, 1961 (tracks 1–4)

== Personnel ==
- Gene Ammons – tenor saxophone
- Walter Bishop Jr. (tracks 5–7), Patti Bown (tracks 1–4) – piano
- Art Davis (tracks 5–7), George Duvivier (tracks 1–4) – bass
- Art Taylor – drums
- Ray Barretto – congas
