= Goodbye (Gene Ammons album) =

Gene Ammons album

Studio album by Gene Ammons
- Released: 1975
- Recorded: March 18–20, 1974
- Studio: CI Recording, NYC
- Genre: Jazz
- Label: Prestige; P 10093
- Producer: Orrin Keepnews

Gene Ammons chronology
Brasswind (1973-74)	Goodbye (1975)

Professional ratings
Review scores
Source	Rating
Allmusic	4/5 stars
The Rolling Stone Jazz Record Guide	3/5 stars
The Penguin Guide to Jazz Recordings	2.5/4 stars

Goodbye is the final album by saxophonist Gene Ammons recorded in 1974 and released on the Prestige label.

== Reception ==
The Allmusic review stated "It is ironic that on tenor saxophonist Gene Ammons' final recording date, the last song he performed was the standard "Goodbye." That emotional rendition is the high point of this session... It's a fine ending to a colorful career".

== Track listing ==
1. "Sticks" (Cannonball Adderley) - 6:29
2. "Alone Again (Naturally)" (Gilbert O'Sullivan) - 5:58
3. "It Don't Mean a Thing (If It Ain't Got That Swing)" (Duke Ellington, Irving Mills) - 5:41
4. "Jeannine" (Duke Pearson) - 7:14
5. "Geru's Blues" (Ammons) - 7:36
6. "Goodbye" (Gordon Jenkins) - 4:32

== Personnel ==
- Gene Ammons - tenor saxophone
- Nat Adderley - cornet
- Gary Bartz - alto saxophone
- Kenny Drew - piano
- Sam Jones - bass
- Louis Hayes - drums
- Ray Barretto - congas (tracks 1–5)
