= Up Tight! (album) =

Studio album by Gene Ammons
- Released: 1961
- Recorded: October 17 & 18, 1961
- Studio: Van Gelder Studio, Englewood Cliffs, New Jersey
- Genre: Jazz
- Length: 37:50
- Label: Prestige; PRLP 7208
- Producer: Esmond Edwards

Gene Ammons chronology
Just Jug (1961)	Up Tight! (1961)	Boss Soul! (1961)

Professional ratings
Review scores
Source	Rating
Allmusic	4/5 stars
Down Beat	3/5 stars
The Penguin Guide to Jazz Recordings	3/4 stars

Up Tight! is an album by saxophonist Gene Ammons recorded in 1961 and released on the Prestige label. The album was recorded at the same sessions that produced Boss Soul!.

== Reception ==
AllMusic reviewer Scott Yanow stated: "His sound and style effectively bridged the gap between bop and soul jazz".

== Track listing ==
All compositions by Gene Ammons, except where indicated.

1. "The Breeze and I" (Ernesto Lecuona, Al Stillman) – 6:25
2. "I Sold My Heart to the Junkman" (Leon René) – 4:30
3. "Moonglow" (Eddie DeLange, Will Hudson, Irving Mills) – 5:02
4. "Up Tight!" – 3:32
5. "The Five O'Clock Whistle" (Kim Gannon, Gene Irwin, Josef Myrow) – 5:56
6. "Jug's Blue Blues" – 8:15
7. "Lester Leaps In" (Lester Young) – 4:10
- Recorded at Van Gelder Studios in Englewood Cliffs, New Jersey on October 17, 1961 (tracks 1, 3, 6 & 7), and October 18, 1961 (tracks 2, 4 & 5)

== Personnel ==
- Gene Ammons – tenor saxophone
- Walter Bishop Jr. (tracks 1, 3, 6 & 7), Patti Bown (tracks 2, 4 & 5) – piano
- Art Davis (tracks 1, 3, 6 & 7), George Duvivier (tracks 2, 4 & 5) – bass
- Art Taylor – drums
- Ray Barretto – congas
