= Boss Tenor =

Studio album by Gene Ammons
- Released: 1960
- Recorded: June 16, 1960
- Studio: Van Gelder Studio, Englewood Cliffs, New Jersey
- Genre: Jazz
- Length: 35:57
- Label: Prestige; PRLP 7180
- Producer: Bob Weinstock

Gene Ammons chronology
The Swingin'est (1958)	Boss Tenor (1960)	Nice an' Cool (1961)

Professional ratings
Review scores
Source	Rating
Allmusic	4.5/5 stars
The Rolling Stone Jazz Record Guide	4/5 stars
The Penguin Guide to Jazz Recordings	3/4 stars

Boss Tenor is an album by saxophonist Gene Ammons recorded in 1960 and released on the Prestige label.

== Reception ==
The Allmusic review by Scott Yanow stated: "Unlike his earlier jam sessions, this particular outing finds Ammons as the only horn, fronting a talented rhythm section... This is a fine outing by one of the true "bosses" of the tenor".

== Track listing ==
All compositions by Gene Ammons, except where indicated.

1. "Hittin' the Jug" – 8:29
2. "Close Your Eyes" (Bernice Petkere) – 3:46
3. "My Romance" (Lorenz Hart, Richard Rodgers) – 4:16
4. "Canadian Sunset" (Norman Gimbel, Eddie Heywood) – 5:24
5. "Blue Ammons" – 4:57
6. "Confirmation" (Charlie Parker) – 5:24
7. "Stompin' at the Savoy" (Benny Goodman, Arthur Sampson, Chick Webb, Andy Razaf) – 3:31

== Personnel ==
- Gene Ammons – tenor saxophone
- Tommy Flanagan – piano
- Doug Watkins – bass
- Art Taylor – drums
- Ray Barretto – congas
