= Blue Gene (Gene Ammons album) =

Studio album by Gene Ammons
- Released: 1958
- Recorded: May 2, 1958
- Studio: Van Gelder Studio, Hackensack, New Jersey
- Genre: Jazz
- Length: 42:35
- Label: Prestige; PRLP 7146
- Producer: Bob Weinstock

Gene Ammons chronology
Groove Blues (1958)	Blue Gene (1958)	The Swingin'est (1958)

Professional ratings
Review scores
Source	Rating
Allmusic	3/5 stars
The Penguin Guide to Jazz Recordings	3.5/4 stars

Blue Gene is an album by saxophonist Gene Ammons recorded in 1958 and released on the Prestige label.

== Reception ==
The AllMusic reviewer Scott Yanow stated: "The final of his series of jam sessions for Prestige features an excellent septet... Few surprises occur but everyone plays up to their usual high level".

== Track listing ==
All compositions by Mal Waldron.

1. "Blue Gene" – 13:54
2. "Scamperin'" – 8:46
3. "Blue Greens and Beans" – 9:00
4. "Hip Tip" – 8:55

== Personnel ==
- Gene Ammons – tenor saxophone
- Idrees Sulieman – trumpet
- Pepper Adams – baritone saxophone
- Mal Waldron – piano
- Doug Watkins – bass
- Art Taylor – drums
- Ray Barretto – congas
