= Walkin' & Talkin' =

Studio album by Bennie Green
- Released: May 1959
- Recorded: January 25, 1959
- Studio: Van Gelder Studio; Hackensack, New Jersey
- Genre: Jazz
- Length: 36:37
- Label: Blue Note; BLP 4010
- Producer: Alfred Lion

Bennie Green chronology
The 45 Session (1958)	Walkin' & Talkin' (1959)	Bennie Green (1959)

Walkin' & Talkin' is an album by American jazz trombonist Bennie Green, recorded on January 25, 1959 and released on Blue Note later that year.

== Release history ==
It was issued on CD only in Japan, in 2004.

== Reception ==
Professional ratings
Review scores
Source	Rating
AllMusic	4/5 stars

The AllMusic review by Stephen Thomas Erlewine states, "All of Bennie Green's Blue Note records were rich with joyously swinging blues and bop, highlighted by his warm, friendly tone and good humor. Walkin' & Talkin', his third record for the label, was no exception to the rule... The result is no different from Green's two previous Blue Note records, but it's no less satisfying, and fans of swinging bop should be contented with Walkin' & Talkin'."

== Track listing ==
All compositions by Gildo Mahones, except as indicated.

=== Side 1 ===
1. "The Shouter" – 4:01
2. "Green Leaves" – 5:45
3. "This Love of Mine" (Frank Sinatra, Sol Parker, Henry W. Sanicola Jr.) – 6:45

=== Side 2 ===
1. "Walkin' and Talkin'" (Bennie Green) – 8:57
2. "All I Do Is Dream of You" (Nacio Herb Brown, Arthur Freed) – 5:33
3. "Hoppin' Johns" – 5:26

== Personnel ==
=== Musicians ===
- Bennie Green – trombone
- Eddie Williams – tenor saxophone
- Gildo Mahones – piano
- George Tucker – bass
- Al Dreares – drums

=== Technical personnel ===
- Alfred Lion – producer
- Rudy Van Gelder – recording engineer, mastering
- Reid Miles – design
- Francis Wolff – photography
- Robert Levin – liner notes
