= Dig Him! =

Studio album by Sonny Stitt and Gene Ammons
- Released: 1961
- Recorded: August 26, 1961; Chicago, Illinois
- Genre: Jazz
- Length: 40:31
- Label: Argo; LP 697

Sonny Stitt chronology
Sonny Stitt at the D. J. Lounge (1961)	Dig Him! (1961)	Boss Tenors (1961)

Gene Ammons chronology
Groovin' with Jug (1961)	Dig Him! (1961)	Boss Tenors (1961)

We'll Be Together Again Cover

Professional ratings
Review scores
Source	Rating
Down Beat (Original Lp release)	4/5 stars
Allmusic	4/5 stars

Dig Him! is an album by saxophonists Gene Ammons and Sonny Stitt recorded in 1961 and originally released on the Argo label in 1961. The album was rereleased as We'll Be Together Again on the Prestige label in 1968.

== Reception ==
The Allmusic review stated "The two tenors always brought out the best in each other, and luckily, they would get back together in the early '70s. This is high-quality bebop".

== Track listing ==
All compositions by Sonny Stitt except as indicated

1. "Red Sails in the Sunset" (Jimmy Kennedy, Hugh Williams) - 4:23
2. "But Not for Me" (George Gershwin, Ira Gershwin) - 4:19
3. "A Pair of Red Pants" - 4:39
4. "We'll Be Together Again" (Carl T. Fischer, Frankie Laine) - 4:36
5. "A Mess" - 3:19
6. "New Blues Up and Down" (Stitt, Gene Ammons) - 3:57
7. "My Foolish Heart" (Ned Washington, Victor Young) - 5:14
8. "Water Jug" (Frank Wess) - 2:39
9. "Autumn Leaves" (Joseph Kosma, Johnny Mercer, Jacques Prévert) - 4:11
10. "Time on My Hands" (Harold Adamson, Mack Gordon, Vincent Youmans) - 3:53

== Personnel ==
- Gene Ammons - tenor saxophone
- Sonny Stitt - tenor saxophone, alto saxophone
- John Houston - piano
- Buster Williams - bass
- George Brown - drums
