= Sonny Stitt at the D. J. Lounge =

1961 live album by Sonny Stitt

Live album by Sonny Stitt
- Released: 1961
- Recorded: June 1961
- Venue: McKie's Disc Jockey Lounge, Chicago, Illinois
- Genre: Jazz
- Length: 42:36
- Label: Argo; LP 683
- Producer: Jack Tracy

Sonny Stitt chronology
The Sensual Sound of Sonny Stitt (1961)	Sonny Stitt at the D. J. Lounge (1961)	Dig Him! (1961)

Professional ratings
Review scores
Source	Rating
Allmusic	4/5 stars

Sonny Stitt at the D. J. Lounge is a live album by saxophonist Sonny Stitt recorded in Chicago in 1961 and released on the Argo label.

== Reception ==
The Allmusic site awarded the album 4 stars stating "Their renditions of a few standards and some riffing blues are spirited if not all that essential".

== Track listing ==
All compositions by Sonny Stitt except as indicated

1. "McKie's" - 9:38
2. "It All Depends on You" (Lew Brown, Buddy DeSylva, Ray Henderson) - 5:58
3. "Blue Moon" (Lorenz Hart, Richard Rodgers) - 5:55
4. "Jay Tee" - 6:21
5. "I'm in the Mood for Love" (Dorothy Fields, Jimmy McHugh) - 4:43
6. "Free Chicken" - 10:01

== Personnel ==
- Sonny Stitt - alto saxophone, tenor saxophone
- John Board - tenor saxophone
- Edward Buster - organ
- Arthur Harper - bass
- Joe Shelton - drums
