= Groove Blues =

Studio album by Gene Ammons
- Released: 1961
- Recorded: January 3, 1958; Van Gelder Studio, Hackensack, New Jersey
- Genre: Jazz
- Length: 49:20
- Label: Prestige; PRLP 7201
- Producer: Bob Weinstock

Gene Ammons chronology
| The Big Sound (1958) | Groove Blues (1961) | Blue Gene (1958) |

Professional ratings
Review scores
| Source | Rating |
|---|---|
| Allmusic | 4/5 stars |
| The Penguin Guide to Jazz Recordings | 3/4 stars |

Groove Blues is an album by saxophonist Gene Ammons recorded in 1958 and released on the Prestige label. The album was recorded at the same session that produced The Big Sound.

== Reception ==
A review for AllMusic by Scott Yanow stated: "On Jan. 3, 1958, Gene Ammons led one of his last all-star jam sessions for Prestige. The most notable aspect to this date (which resulted in two albums of material) is that it featured among its soloists John Coltrane, on alto".

== Track listing ==
All compositions by Mal Waldron, except as indicated

1. "Ammon Joy" - 13:19
2. "Groove Blues" - 9:35
3. "Jug Handle" - 10:11
4. "It Might as Well Be Spring" (Oscar Hammerstein II, Richard Rodgers) - 11:32

== Personnel ==
- Gene Ammons - tenor saxophone
- Jerome Richardson - flute (tracks 1–3)
- John Coltrane - alto saxophone (tracks 1, 2 & 4)
- Paul Quinichette - tenor saxophone (track 1 & 2)
- Pepper Adams - baritone saxophone (tracks 1 & 2)
- Mal Waldron - piano
- George Joyner - bass
- Art Taylor - drums
