= Boss Tenors =

Studio album by Sonny Stitt and Gene Ammons
- Released: 1961
- Recorded: August 27, 1961; Chicago, Illinois
- Genre: Jazz
- Length: 38:36
- Labels: Verve; V/V6 8426
- Producer: Creed Taylor

Sonny Stitt chronology
Dig Him! (1961)	Boss Tenors (1961)	Stitt Meets Brother Jack (1962)

Gene Ammons chronology
Dig Him! (1961)	Boss Tenors (1961)	Just Jug (1961)

Professional ratings
Review scores
Source	Rating
Allmusic	4.5/5 stars
Down Beat	4.5/5 stars

Boss Tenors (subtitled Straight Ahead from Chicago August 1961) is an album by saxophonists Gene Ammons and Sonny Stitt recorded in Chicago in 1961 and originally released on the Verve label.

== Reception ==
The Allmusic review stated "Tenor saxophonists Gene Ammons and Sonny Stitt co-led a small group in 1950, and this follow-up, taped in the studio in 1961, finds the two picking up where they left off".

== Track listing ==
1. "Blues Up and Down" (Gene Ammons, Sonny Stitt) - 8:47
2. "Counter Clockwise" (Sonny Stitt) - 9:38
3. "There Is No Greater Love" (Isham Jones, Marty Symes) - 6:30
4. "The One Before This" (Gene Ammons) - 7:09
5. "Autumn Leaves" (Joseph Kosma, Johnny Mercer, Jacques Prévert) - 6:32

== Personnel ==
- Gene Ammons - tenor saxophone
- Sonny Stitt - tenor saxophone (tracks 1, 2, 4, 5), alto saxophone (track 3)
- John Houston - piano
- Buster Williams - bass
- George Brown - drums
