= God Bless Jug and Sonny =

Live album by Sonny Stitt and Gene Ammons
- Released: 2001
- Recorded: June 24, 1973
- Venue: Left Bank Jazz Society at the Famous Ballroom, Baltimore, Maryland
- Genre: Jazz
- Length: 68:02
- Label: Prestige; PRCD 11019
- Producer: Eric Miller

Gene Ammons chronology
Big Bad Jug (1972)	God Bless Jug and Sonny (2001)	Left Bank Encores (1973)

Sonny Stitt chronology
The Champ (1973)	God Bless Jug and Sonny (1973)	Left Bank Encores (1973)

Professional ratings
Review scores
Source	Rating
Allmusic	3/5 stars

God Bless Jug and Sonny is a live album by saxophonists Sonny Stitt and Gene Ammons recorded in Baltimore in 1973 and released on the Prestige label in 2001.

== Reception ==
The Allmusic review stated "Unlike some of their 1940s/early '50s encounters, God Bless Jug and Sonny falls short of essential. But this 1973 reunion is still enjoyable and will interest the saxophonists' hardcore fans".

== Track listing ==
1. "Blue 'n' Boogie" (Dizzy Gillespie, Frank Paparelli) - 16:36
2. "Stringin' the Jug" (Gene Ammons, Sonny Stitt) - 14:58
3. "God Bless the Child" (Billie Holiday, Arthur Herzog Jr.) - 5:48
4. "Autumn in New York" (Vernon Duke) - 5:05
5. "Ugetsu" (Cedar Walton) - 7:44
6. "Bye Bye Blackbird" (Mort Dixon, Ray Henderson) - 17:51

== Personnel ==
- Gene Ammons - tenor saxophone (tracks 1, 2, 3 & 6)
- Sonny Stitt - tenor saxophone (tracks 1, 2 & 6), alto saxophone (track 4)
- Cedar Walton - piano - trio track 5
- Sam Jones - bass
- Billy Higgins - drums
