= Left Bank Encores =

Live album by Sonny Stitt and Gene Ammons
- Released: 2002
- Recorded: June 24, 1973
- Venue: Left Bank Jazz Society at the Famous Ballroom, Baltimore, Maryland
- Genre: Jazz
- Length: 73:15
- Label: Prestige; PRCD 11022
- Producer: Eric Miller

Gene Ammons chronology
God Bless Jug and Sonny (1973)	Left Bank Encores (2002)	Gene Ammons and Friends at Montreux (1973)

Sonny Stitt chronology
God Bless Jug and Sonny (1973)	Left Bank Encores (1973)	Satan (1973)

Professional ratings
Review scores
Source	Rating
Allmusic	3/5 stars

Left Bank Encores is a live album by saxophonists Sonny Stitt and Gene Ammons recorded in Baltimore in 1973 and released on the Prestige label in 2002. The album was recorded at the same concert that produced God Bless Jug and Sonny.

== Reception ==
The Allmusic review stated "when the saxmen were reunited at that Baltimore concert in 1973, they weren't as competitive and battle-minded as they had been in their younger days. But their chops were still in top shape, and they could still swing unapologetically hard... Like God Bless Jug and Sonny, Left Bank Encores falls short of essential, but is an enjoyable disc that Ammons and Stitt's hardcore fans will appreciate".

== Track listing ==
1. Just in Time" (Betty Comden, Adolph Green, Jule Styne) – 9:08
2. "They Can't Take That Away from Me" (George Gershwin, Ira Gershwin) – 11:31
3. "Theme from Love Story" (Francis Lai, Carl Sigman) – 9:39
4. "Exactly Like You" (Dorothy Fields, Jimmy McHugh) – 6:56
5. "Don't Go to Strangers" (Redd Evans, Arthur Kent, Dave Mann) – 6:04
6. "Autumn Leaves" (Joseph Kosma, Johnny Mercer, Jacques Prévert) – 15:52
7. "Blues Up and Down" (Gene Ammons, Sonny Stitt) – 14:05

== Personnel ==
- Gene Ammons – tenor saxophone (tracks 1, 2 & 4–7)
- Sonny Stitt – tenor saxophone (tracks 1 & 4–7), alto saxophone (track 2)
- Cedar Walton – piano – trio track 3
- Sam Jones – bass
- Billy Higgins – drums
- Etta Jones – vocals (tracks 4 & 5)
