= Just Jug =

Live album by Gene Ammons
- Released: 1962
- Recorded: August 29, 1961; The DJ Lounge, Chicago, Illinois
- Genre: Jazz
- Label: Argo; LP 698

Gene Ammons chronology
Boss Tenors (1961)	Just Jug (1962)	Up Tight! (1961)

Gene Ammons Live! in Chicago Cover

Professional ratings
Review scores
Source	Rating
AllMusic	4/5 stars

Just Jug is a live album by saxophonists Gene Ammons recorded in Chicago in 1961 and originally released on the Argo label in 1962. The album was rereleased as Gene Ammons Live! in Chicago with two bonus tracks on the Prestige label.

== Reception ==
AllMusic reviewer Scott Yanow stated: "This is one of many Gene Ammons recordings from the 1961–62 period; virtually all are worth getting".

== Track listing ==
All compositions by Gene Ammons, except as indicated

1. "Scrapple from the Apple" (Charlie Parker) – 5:17
2. "Falling in Love With Love" (Lorenz Hart, Richard Rodgers) – 4:44
3. "Please Send Me Someone to Love" (Percy Mayfield) – 5:08
4. "Sweet Georgia Brown" (Ben Bernie, Kenneth Casey, Maceo Pinkard) – 4:24
5. "It Could Happen to You" (Johnny Burke, Jimmy Van Heusen) – 4:21
6. "Foot Tappin'" – 6:51
7. "Jug's Blue Blues" – 5:39
8. "Fast Track" – 4:02
9. "C Jam Blues" (Barney Bigard, Duke Ellington) – 8:08 Bonus track on Gene Ammons Live! in Chicago CD reissue
10. "But Not for Me" (George Gershwin, Ira Gershwin) – 5:33 Bonus track on Gene Ammons Live! in Chicago CD reissue

== Personnel ==
- Gene Ammons – tenor saxophone
- Eddie Buster – organ
- Gerald Donovan – drums
