= The 45 Session =

Studio album by Bennie Green
- Released: 1975
- Recorded: November 23, 1958
- Genre: Jazz
- Label: Blue Note

Bennie Green chronology
The Swingin'est (1958)	The 45 Session (1975)	Walkin' & Talkin' (1959)

The 45 Session is an album by American trombonist Bennie Green recorded in 1958 but first released on the Japanese Blue Note label in 1975 as Minor Revelation. The tracks were originally intended for release as 45 rpm singles.

== Reception ==
Professional ratings
Review scores
Source	Rating
AllMusic	4/5 stars

The AllMusic review by Stephen Thomas Erlewine awarded the album 4 stars and stated "it's a bit frustrating to hear the songs in truncated form, but since that's the only way they exist, fans should cherish what we do have. And this is music to cherish. Green's Blue Note recordings are consistently fun, and this is no exception. Each song swings with energy, offering each instrumentalist a chance to shine... the music is as appealing today as when it was recorded".

== Track listing ==
All tracks are written by Bennie Green except as indicated.

No.	Title	Writer(s)	Length
1.	"It's Groovy"	Unknown	3:45
2.	"On the Street Where You Live"	Alan Jay Lerner, Frederick Loewe	5:54
3.	"Can't We Be Friends?"	Paul James, Kay Swift	5:35
4.	"Ain't Nothin' but the Blues"		5:17
5.	"Encore"	Babs Gonzales	4:33
6.	"Bye Bye Blackbird"	Mort Dixon, Ray Henderson	5:28
7.	"Minor Revelation"	Harold Ousley	5:20
8.	"Why Do I Love You?"	Oscar Hammerstein II, Jerome Kern	6:02
9.	"Encore" (Alternate Master)	Gonzales	4:16

- Recorded at Rudy Van Gelder Studio, Hackensack, New Jersey on November 23, 1958.

== Personnel ==
- Bennie Green - trombone
- Eddie Williams - tenor saxophone
- Sonny Clark - piano
- Paul Chambers - bass
- Jerry Segal - drums
- Babs Gonzales - vocals (tracks 5 & 9)
