= Got My Own =

Album by Gene Ammons

Studio album by Gene Ammons
- Released: 1972
- Recorded: October 28 & 30 and November 1, 1972
- Studio: Van Gelder Studio, Englewood Cliffs, New Jersey
- Genre: Jazz
- Length: 38:03
- Label: Prestige; PR 10058
- Producer: Ozzie Cadena

Gene Ammons chronology
| Free Again (1972) | Got My Own (1972) | Big Bad Jug (1972) |

Professional ratings
Review scores
| Source | Rating |
|---|---|
| Allmusic | 2.5/5 stars |
| The Rolling Stone Jazz Record Guide | 2/5 stars |

Got My Own is an album by saxophonist Gene Ammons recorded in 1972 and released on the Prestige label.

== Reception ==
Allmusic awarded the album 2½ stars with its review by Scott Yanow stating, "Ammons's huge sound makes the music worthwhile".

== Track listing ==
1. "Lady Sings the Blues" (Billie Holiday, Herbie Nichols) - 5:30
2. "God Bless the Child" (Holiday, Arthur Herzog, Jr.) - 4:05
3. "Strange Fruit" (Abel Meeropol) - 3:30
4. "Fine and Mellow" (Holiday) - 5:30
5. "Play Me" (Neil Diamond) - 6:00
6. "Ben" (Don Black, Walter Scharf) - 5:30
7. "The Shack Out Back" (Gene Ammons) - 7:58
- Recorded at Van Gelder Studio in Englewood Cliffs, New Jersey on October 28, 1972 (tracks 1, 5 & 6), November 30, 1972 (tracks 3 & 4) and November 1, 1972 (tracks 2 & 7)

== Personnel ==
- Gene Ammons - tenor saxophone
- Ernie Hayes - organ (tracks 1, 4, 5 & 7)
- Hank Jones - electric piano (tracks 1 & 3–6)
- Sonny Phillips - piano, organ (tracks 2 & 7)
- Joe Beck (tracks 1, 4, 5 & 6), Maynard Parker (tracks 2 & 7) - guitar
- Ron Carter - bass, electric bass
- Billy Cobham (tracks 2 & 7), Idris Muhammad (tracks 1, 5 & 6), Mickey Roker (tracks 3 & 4) - drums
- Ed Bogas - arranger
- Unidentified strings
