= Walking Down =

Studio album by Bennie Green
- Released: 1956
- Recorded: June 29, 1956
- Genre: Jazz
- Length: 40:59
- Label: Prestige
- Producer: Bob Weinstock

Bennie Green chronology
Bennie Green with Art Farmer (1956)	Walking Down (1956)	Back on the Scene (1958)

Walking Down is an album by American trombonist Bennie Green, recorded in 1956 and released on the Prestige label.

== Reception ==
Professional ratings
Review scores
Source	Rating
AllMusic	4/5 stars
The Penguin Guide to Jazz Recordings	2.5/4 stars

The AllMusic review by Scott Yanow awarded the album 4 stars and stated: "The solos are colorful if occasionally stumbling, and the arrangements of the four standards and Green's "East of the Little Big Horn" have their share of surprises."

== Track listing ==
All compositions by Bennie Green except as indicated

1. "Walkin'" (credited as "Walking Down") (Richard Carpenter) - 12:00
2. "The Things We Did Last Summer (Sammy Cahn, Jule Styne) - 12:19
3. "East of the Little Big Horn" (Bennie Green) - 5:36
4. "It's You or No One" (Cahn, Styne) - 5:44
5. "But Not for Me" (George Gershwin, Ira Gershwin) - 5:20

- Recorded at Rudy Van Gelder Studio, Hackensack, New Jersey on June 29, 1956.

== Personnel ==
- Bennie Green - trombone
- Eric Dixon - tenor saxophone
- Lloyd Mayers - piano
- Sonny Wellesley - bass
- Bill English - drums
