= The Swingin'est =

Studio album by Bennie Green and Gene Ammons
- Released: 1958
- Recorded: November 12, 1958
- Studio: Bell Sound (New York City)
- Genre: Jazz
- Length: 63:26
- Label: Vee-Jay
- Producer: Sid McCoy

Bennie Green chronology
Soul Stirrin' (1958)	The Swingin'est (1958)	The 45 Session (1958)

Gene Ammons chronology
Blue Gene (1958)	The Swingin'est (1958)	Boss Tenor (1960)

The Swingin'est is an album by American trombonist Bennie Green and saxophonist Gene Ammons recorded in 1958 and released on the Vee-Jay label. The album has also been released under the title Juggin' Around.

== Reception ==
Professional ratings
Review scores
Source	Rating
Allmusic	2/5 stars
DownBeat	4/5 stars
The Penguin Guide to Jazz Recordings	3/4 stars

The Allmusic review by Scott Yanow awarded the album 2 stars and stated "The emphasis is on the blues and very basic chord changes on this relaxed jam session... Due to the similarity of the material plus three alternate takes that have been added to augment the original program, it is advisable to listen to this CD in small doses".

== Track listing ==
1. "Juggin' Around" (Frank Foster) – 6:31
2. "Going South" (Foster) – 10:44
3. "Jim Dog" (Gene Ammons) – 7:05
4. "Sermonette" (Nat Adderley, Jon Hendricks) – 4:19
5. "A Little Ditty" (Frank Wess) – 4:01
6. "Swingin' for Benny" (Bennie Green) – 12:10 Bonus track on CD reissue
7. "Juggin' Around" [alternate take] (Foster) – 6:47 Bonus track on CD reissue
8. "Jim Dog" [alternate take] (Ammons) – 7:31 Bonus track on CD reissue
9. "Sermonette" (Adderley, Hendricks) – 4:18 Bonus track on CD reissue

- Recorded at Bell Sound Studios, New York City on November 12, 1958.

== Personnel ==
- Bennie Green – trombone
- Gene Ammons, Frank Foster – tenor saxophone
- Nat Adderley – cornet
- Frank Wess – tenor saxophone, flute
- Tommy Flanagan – piano
- Eddie Jones – bass
- Albert Heath – drums
