= The Champ (Sonny Stitt album) =

Studio album by Sonny Stitt
- Released: 1974
- Recorded: April 18, 1973
- Genre: Jazz, Bebop
- Length: 37:35
- Label: Muse Records MR 5023
- Producer: Don Schlitten

Sonny Stitt chronology
Mr. Bojangles (1973)	The Champ (1974)	God Bless Jug and Sonny (1973)

Professional ratings
Review scores
Source	Rating
All About Jazz	(not rated)
AllMusic	3/5 stars
The Rolling Stone Jazz Record Guide	3/5 stars

The Champ is a Sonny Stitt album recorded at RCA's Studio B on April 18, 1973, and released on the Muse label.

== Track listing ==
=== Side 1 ===
1. "The Champ" (Gillespie) – 8:48
2. "Sweet and Lovely" (Arnheim, Tobias, Lemare) – 7:11
3. "The Midgets" (Newman) – 5:36

=== Side 2 ===
1. "The Eternal Triangle" (Stitt) – 5:21
2. "All the Things You Are" (Kern-Hammerstein) – 4:32
3. "Walkin'" (Carpenter) – 9:43
- Note that on Side 1 Track 2 time is not 6:12 as listed on the label of the vinyl disc.

== Personnel ==
- Sonny Stitt – alto & tenor saxophone
- Joe Newman – trumpet
- Duke Jordan – piano
- Sam Jones – bass
- Roy Brooks – drums

== Production ==
- Producer: Don Schlitten
- Engineers: Paul Goodman
