= Gene Ammons and Friends at Montreux =

Live album by Gene Ammons
- Released: 1973
- Recorded: July 7, 1973; Montreux Jazz Festival in Montreux, Switzerland
- Genre: Jazz
- Length: 45:25
- Label: Prestige; P 10078
- Producer: Orrin Keepnews

Gene Ammons chronology
Left Bank Encores (1973)	Gene Ammons and Friends at Montreux (1973)	Gene Ammons in Sweden (1973)

Professional ratings
Review scores
Source	Rating
AllMusic	4/5 stars
The Rolling Stone Jazz Record Guide	4/5 stars
The Penguin Guide to Jazz Recordings	3/4 stars

Gene Ammons and Friends at Montreux is a live album by saxophonist Gene Ammons recorded at the Montreux Jazz Festival in 1973 and released on the Prestige label.

== Reception ==
The AllMusic review states "This is one of the better late-period Gene Ammons records".

== Track listing ==
1. "Yardbird Suite" (Charlie Parker) - 7:20
2. "Since I Fell for You" (Buddy Johnson) - 8:13
3. "New Sonny's Blues" (Sonny Stitt) - 7:23
4. "Sophisticated Lady" (Duke Ellington, Irving Mills, Mitchell Parish) - 5:32
5. "'Treux Bleu" (Gene Ammons) - 16:57

== Personnel ==
- Gene Ammons - tenor saxophone
- Hampton Hawes - piano, electric piano
- Bob Cranshaw - electric bass
- Kenny Clarke - drums
- Kenneth Nash - congas

On 'Treux Blue only add:

- Cannonball Adderley - alto saxophone
- Nat Adderley - cornet
- Dexter Gordon - tenor saxophone
