= Velvet Soul (Gene Ammons album) =

Studio album by Gene Ammons
- Released: 1964
- Recorded: June 17, 1960, June 13, 1961 and September 5, 1962
- Studio: Van Gelder Studio, Englewood Cliffs, New Jersey
- Genre: Jazz
- Length: 38:24
- Label: Prestige; PR 7320
- Producer: Esmond Edwards

Gene Ammons chronology
Jug & Dodo (1962)	Velvet Soul (1964)	Angel Eyes (1960–62)

Professional ratings
Review scores
Source	Rating
Allmusic	2.5/5 stars
The Rolling Stone Jazz Record Guide	3/5 stars

Velvet Soul is an album by saxophonist Gene Ammons compiling sessions recorded between 1960 and 1962 and released on the Prestige label in 1964.

== Reception ==
Allmusic awarded the album 2½ stars with its review by Stewart Mason stating, "Released as Gene Ammons was starting a long prison sentence for possession of narcotics, Velvet Soul is a collection of Master takes pieced together from three different 1960–1962 sessions. As a result, it barely hangs together as an album". In the CD era the tracks "Velvet Soul" and "In Sid's Thing" have been combined with four other tracks from that session which appear on the Angel Eyes album to form 40 minutes of the 80 minute CD The Gene Ammons Story: Organ Combos.

== Track listing ==
All compositions by Mal Waldron except as indicated

1. "Light'n Up" – 4:02
2. "In Sid's Thing" (Gene Ammons) – 5:25
3. "Salome's Tune" – 4:16
4. "A Stranger in Town" (Mel Tormé) – 6:02
5. "Velvet Soul" (Johnny "Hammond" Smith) – 8:54
6. "The Song Is You" (Oscar Hammerstein II, Jerome Kern) – 9:45
- Recorded at Van Gelder Studio in Englewood Cliffs New Jersey on June 17, 1960 (tracks 2 & 5), June 13, 1961 (track 6) and September 5, 1962 (tracks 1, 3 & 4)

== Personnel ==
- Gene Ammons – tenor saxophone
- Hobart Dotson, Clark Terry – trumpet (track 6)
- Oliver Nelson – alto saxophone, arranger (track 6)
- George Barrow, Red Holloway – tenor saxophone (track 6)
- Frank Wess – tenor saxophone, (tracks 2 & 5)
- Bob Ashton – baritone saxophone (track 6)
- Mal Waldron (tracks 1, 3 & 4), Richard Wyands (track 6) – piano
- Johnny "Hammond" Smith – organ (tracks 2 & 5)
- Wendell Marshall (tracks 1, 3, 4 & 6), Doug Watkins (tracks 2 & 5) – bass
- Bill English (track 6), Art Taylor (tracks 2 & 5), Ed Thigpen (tracks 1, 3 & 4) – drums
- Ray Barretto – congas (track 6)
