= Preachin' =

Studio album by Gene Ammons
- Released: 1962
- Recorded: May 3, 1962; Chicago, Illinois
- Genre: Jazz
- Label: Prestige; PR 7270

Gene Ammons chronology
Blue Groove (1962)	Preachin' (1962)	Jug & Dodo (1962)

Professional ratings
Review scores
Source	Rating
AllMusic	4/5 stars
The Penguin Guide to Jazz Recordings	2/4 stars

Preachin' is an album by saxophonist Gene Ammons recorded in 1962 and released on the Prestige label.

== Reception ==
The AllMusic review by Scott Yanow stated: "the great tenor performs 11 religious hymns that are straight from the church... this little-known album is a rather touching and emotional outing, and is quite unique".

== Track listing ==
All compositions traditional, except as indicated

1. "Sweet Hour" - 3:15
2. "Yield Not" - 2:01
3. "Abide with Me" (Henry Francis Lyte, William Henry Monk) - 3:18
4. "Blessed Assurance" (Fanny J. Crosby, Phoebe P. Knapp) - 3:18
5. "The Prayer" - 3:00
6. "You'll Never Walk Alone" (Oscar Hammerstein II, Richard Rodgers) - 3:44
7. "I Believe" (Ervin Drake, Irvin Graham, Jimmy Shirl, Al Stillman) - 3:18
8. "Precious Memories" (J. B. F. Wright) - 4:11
9. "What a Friend" (Joseph M. Scriven, Charles Crozat Converse) - 3:35
10. "Holy Holy" - 2:45
11. "The Light" - 2:49

== Personnel ==
- Gene Ammons - tenor saxophone
- Clarence "Sleepy" Anderson - organ
- Sylvester Hickman - bass
- Dorral Anderson - drums
