= Blue Groove =

Studio album by Gene Ammons
- Released: 1982
- Recorded: April 27, 1962; Chicago, Illinois
- Genre: Jazz
- Label: Prestige; MPP 2514
- Producer: Bob Porter

Gene Ammons chronology
The Soulful Moods of Gene Ammons (1962)	Blue Groove (1982)	Preachin' (1962)

Professional ratings
Review scores
Source	Rating
Allmusic	2/5 stars

Blue Groove is an album by saxophonist Gene Ammons recorded in 1961 but not released on the Prestige label until 1982.

== Reception ==
Allmusic awarded the album 2 stars with its review by Scott Yanow stating, "This particular LP, released for the first time in 1982, is an average, although enjoyable enough, outing... Nothing that unusual occurs but fans should enjoy this set".

== Track listing ==
All compositions by Gene Ammons except where noted.

1. "Blue Groove" – 4:19
2. "You Better Go Now" (Irvin Graham, Bickley Reichner) – 3:15
3. "It Never Goes Away" (Clarence Anderson) – 7:50
4. "Blinky" – 3:29
5. "Yea! " – 3:09
6. "Someone to Watch Over Me" (George Gershwin, Ira Gershwin) – 5:30
7. "Sleepy" (Anderson) – 4:44
8. "The Masquerade Is Over" (Herb Magidson, Allie Wrubel) – 4:43

== Personnel ==
- Gene Ammons – tenor saxophone
- Clarence "Sleepy" Anderson – organ, piano
- Unnamed musicians – guitar, bass, drums, vocals
