= Angel Eyes (Gene Ammons album) =

Studio album by Gene Ammons
- Released: 1965
- Recorded: June 17, 1960, and September 5, 1962
- Studios: Van Gelder Studio, Englewood Cliffs, New Jersey
- Genre: Jazz
- Length: 36:25
- Labels: Prestige; PR 7369
- Producer: Esmond Edwards

Gene Ammons chronology
Velvet Soul (1964)	Angel Eyes (1965)	Sock! (1965)

Professional ratings
Review scores
Source	Rating
Allmusic	4/5 stars
The Rolling Stone Jazz Record Guide	3/5 stars
The Penguin Guide to Jazz Recordings	3/4 stars

Angel Eyes is an album by saxophonist Gene Ammons compiling sessions recorded in 1960 and 1962 and released on the Prestige label in 1965.

== Reception ==
Allmusic awarded the album 4 stars with its review by Scott Yanow stating, "Music from two different occasions are combined on this CD reissue... The latter set was one of Ammons' final ones before serving a long prison sentence (drug-related), yet his interpretations are full of optimism. Recommended".

== Track listing ==
1. "Gettin' Around" (Gene Ammons) – 6:46
2. "Blue Room" (Lorenz Hart, Richard Rodgers) – 5:34
3. "You Go to My Head" (J. Fred Coots, Haven Gillespie) – 5:55
4. "Angel Eyes" (Earl Brent, Matt Dennis) – 8:45
5. "Water Jug" (Frank Wess) – 5:10
6. "It's the Talk of the Town" (Jerry Livingston, Al J. Neiburg, Marty Symes) – 4:15

Note

- Recorded at Van Gelder Studio in Englewood Cliffs New Jersey on June 17, 1960 (tracks 1, 2, 4 & 5) and September 5, 1962 (tracks 3 & 6)

== Personnel ==
- Gene Ammons – tenor saxophone
- Frank Wess – flute, (tracks 1, 2 and 4) – tenor saxophone, (track 5)
- Johnny "Hammond" Smith – organ (tracks 1, 2, 4 & 5)
- Mal Waldron (tracks 3 & 6) – piano
- Doug Watkins (tracks 1, 2, 4 & 5), Wendell Marshall (tracks 3 & 6) – bass
- Art Taylor (tracks 1, 2, 4 & 5), Ed Thigpen (tracks 3 & 6) – drums
