= Big Bad Jug =

Studio album by Gene Ammons
- Released: 1973
- Recorded: October 28 & 30 and November 1, 1972
- Studio: Van Gelder Studio, Englewood Cliffs, New Jersey
- Genre: Jazz
- Label: Prestige; PR 10070
- Producer: Ozzie Cadena

Gene Ammons chronology
| Got My Own (1972) | Big Bad Jug (1973) | God Bless Jug and Sonny (1973) |

Professional ratings
Review scores
| Source | Rating |
|---|---|
| Allmusic | 2/5 stars |

Big Bad Jug is an album by saxophonist Gene Ammons recorded in 1972 and released on the Prestige label.

== Reception ==
Allmusic awarded the album 2 stars with its review by Scott Yanow stating, "The repertoire, which includes a couple of funky originals... is not too inspiring... but Ammons makes the best of it".

== Track listing ==
All compositions by Gene Ammons except where noted.

1. "Lady Mama" – 6:52
2. "I Can't Help Myself" (Lamont Dozier, Brian Holland, Eddie Holland) – 4:13
3. "Lucille" (Little Richard, Harold Vick) – 4:55
4. "Fly Me" – 3:10
5. "Big Bad Jug" – 7:46
6. "Papa Was a Rollin' Stone" (Norman Whitfield, Barrett Strong) – 4:31
7. "Fuzz" (Dave Grusin) – 4:27
- Recorded at Van Gelder Studio in Englewood Cliffs, New Jersey on October 28, 1972 (tracks 4 & 7), November 30, 1972 (tracks 3 & 4) and November 1, 1972 (tracks 2 & 7)

== Personnel ==
- Gene Ammons – tenor saxophone
- Ernie Hayes – organ (tracks 4, 5 & 7)
- Hank Jones – electric piano (tracks 4, 5 & 7)
- Sonny Phillips – piano, organ (tracks 1–3 & 6)
- Joe Beck (tracks 4, 5 & 7), Maynard Parker (tracks 1–3 & 6) – guitar
- Ron Carter – bass, electric bass
- Billy Cobham (tracks 1–3 & 6), Idris Muhammad (tracks 4 & 7), Mickey Roker (track 5) – drums
