= Jug & Dodo =

Studio album by Gene Ammons and Dodo Marmarosa
- Released: 1972
- Recorded: May 4, 1962; Chicago, Illinois
- Genre: Jazz
- Length: 70:00
- Label: Prestige; PR 24021

Gene Ammons chronology
| Preachin' (1962) | Jug & Dodo (1972) | Velvet Soul (1960–62) |

CD Reissue Cover

Professional ratings
Review scores
| Source | Rating |
|---|---|
| Allmusic | 3/5 stars |
| The Rolling Stone Jazz Record Guide | 4/5 stars |
| The Penguin Guide to Jazz Recordings | 3/4 stars |

Jug & Dodo is a 1972 double album featuring pianist Dodo Marmarosa and saxophonist Gene Ammons. It was recorded in 1962, but was not released until ten years later, on the Prestige label.

== Reception ==
The AllMusic review by Scott Yanow stated: "This historical curiosity contains plenty of hard-swinging performances and is worth picking up".

== Track listing ==
1. "Georgia" (Hoagy Carmichael, Stuart Gorrell) - 5:35
2. "For You" (Johnny Burke, Al Dubin) - 4:26
3. "You're Driving Me Crazy" (Walter Donaldson) - 6:48
4. "Where or When" (Lorenz Hart, Richard Rodgers) - 6:57
5. "The Song Is You" (Oscar Hammerstein II, Jerome Kern) - 7:36
6. "Just Friends" (John Klenner, Sam M. Lewis) - 5:20
7. "Yardbird Suite" [take 1] (Charlie Parker) - 3:54
8. "Yardbird Suite" [take 2] (Parker) - 4:23
9. "I Remember You" (Johnny Mercer, Victor Schertzinger) - 3:45
10. "Bluzarumba" (Gene Ammons) - 3:34
11. "The Moody Blues" (Dodo Marmarosa) - 4:13
12. "Falling in Love with Love" [take 1] (Hart, Rodgers) - 4:56
13. "Falling in Love With Love" (Hart, Rodgers) - 3:38
14. "The Very Thought of You" (Ray Noble) - 4:02

== Personnel ==
- Gene Ammons - tenor saxophone (tracks 1–4, 10, 12 & 13)
- Dodo Marmarosa - piano
- Sam Jones - bass
- Marshall Thompson - drums
