= Soul Stirrin' =

Studio album by Bennie Green
- Released: 1958
- Recorded: April 28, 1958
- Studio: Van Gelder Studio; Hackensack, NJ
- Genre: Jazz
- Length: 46:38
- Label: Blue Note; BLP 1599
- Producer: Alfred Lion

Bennie Green chronology
Back on the Scene (1958)	Soul Stirrin' (1958)	The Swingin'est (1958)

Soul Stirrin' is an album by American trombonist Bennie Green, recorded on April 28, 1958, and released on Blue Note later that year. In 2003, the album was reissued by Mosaic Records as part of a compilation titled Mosaic Select: Bennie Green.

== Reception ==
Professional ratings
Review scores
Source	Rating
AllMusic	4/5 stars
The Virgin Encyclopedia of Jazz	4/5 stars

The AllMusic review by Stephen Thomas Erlewine states, "Soul Stirrin' is an invigorating, exciting date from trombonist Bennie Green, showcasing his wide range of skills.... Each musician plays with soul and passion, both on the laidback blues and mambos and the rollicking swing numbers. It's a thoroughly enjoyable record and one that is a good introduction to Green's wonderful, friendly style."

Marc Davis of All About Jazz wrote, "This is a bluesy, almost pre-bop record... Soul Stirrin' is an unexpected pleasure from a jazz man who is largely forgotten. Now that I've discovered Bennie Green, I want to hear more."

Author Scott Yanow described the group as "particularly intriguing," and remarked, "All of the horns and Clark get in their solos, a wide variety of tempos are employed, and the overall result is one of the trombonist's strongest recordings."

== Track listing ==
All tracks are written by Bennie Green, except as noted.

Side 1
No.	Title	Writer(s)	Length
1.	"Soul Stirrin'"	Babs Gonzales	6:50
2.	"We Wanna Cook"		6:38
3.	"That's All"	Alan Brandt; Bob Haymes	6:25

Side 2
No.	Title	Writer(s)	Length
1.	"Lullaby of the Doomed"	Gonzales	6:01
2.	"B. G. Mambo"		8:15
3.	"Black Pearl"	Bill Graham	5:45

CD reissue bonus track
No.	Title	Writer(s)	Length
7.	"Soul Stirrin'" (mono take)	Gonzales	6:44

== Personnel ==
=== Musicians ===
- Bennie Green – trombone, vocals
- Gene Ammons, Billy Root – tenor saxophone
- Sonny Clark – piano
- Ike Isaacs – bass
- Elvin Jones – drums
- Babs Gonzales – vocals (tracks 1, 2 & 7)

=== Technical personnel ===
- Alfred Lion – producer
- Rudy Van Gelder – recording engineer, mastering
- Reid Miles – design
- Francis Wolff – photography
- Jack Walker – liner notes
