= The Boss Is Back! =

Studio album by Gene Ammons
- Released: 1969
- Recorded: November 10 & 11, 1969
- Studio: Van Gelder Studio, Englewood Cliffs, New Jersey
- Genre: Jazz
- Length: 39:40
- Label: Prestige; PR 7739
- Producer: Bob Porter

Gene Ammons chronology
Bad! Bossa Nova (1962)	The Boss Is Back! (1969)	Brother Jug! (1969)

Professional ratings
Review scores
Source	Rating
Allmusic	4/5 stars
The Rolling Stone Jazz Record Guide	3/5 stars
The Penguin Guide to Jazz Recordings	2.5/4 stars

The Boss Is Back! is an album by saxophonist Gene Ammons recorded in 1969 and released on the Prestige label. It was his second charting album, reaching No. 174 on the Billboard Top LPs, during a two-week run on the chart.

== Reception ==
Allmusic awarded the album 4 stars with its review by Scott Yanow stating, "The executives at Prestige must have been felt ecstatic when they heard Gene Ammons first play after his release from a very severe seven-year jail sentence. The great tenor proved to still be in his prime, his huge sound was unchanged and he was hungry to make new music... Ammons shows that he had not forgotten how to jam the blues either".

== Track listing ==
All compositions by Gene Ammons except where noted.

1. "The Jungle Boss" (Gene Ammons, Junior Mance) – 5:36
2. "I Wonder" (Cecil Gant, Raymond Leveen) – 7:59
3. "Feeling Good" (Leslie Bricusse, Anthony Newley) – 5:42
4. "Tastin' the Jug" – 7:28
5. "Here's That Rainy Day" (Johnny Burke, Jimmy Van Heusen) – 6:07
6. "Madame Queen" – 6:48

Note

- Recorded at Van Gelder Studio in Englewood Cliffs, New Jersey on November 10 (tracks 1, 2 & 4–6) and November 11 (track 3), 1969

== Personnel ==
- Gene Ammons – tenor saxophone
- Prince James, Houston Person – tenor saxophone (track 1)
- Junior Mance – piano (tracks 1, 2 & 4–6)
- Sonny Phillips organ (track 3)
- Buster Williams – bass (tracks 1, 2 & 4–6)
- Bob Bushnell – electric bass (track 3)
- Frankie Jones (tracks 1, 2 & 4–6), Bernard Purdie (track 3) – drums
- Candido – congas (tracks 1, 2 & 4–6)

== Charts ==
Chart (1970)	Peak position
US Billboard Top LPs	174
