= Sonny Side Up (Roost album) =

Studio album by Sonny Stitt
- Released: 1961
- Recorded: August 8, 1960
- Studio: Bell Sound (New York City)
- Genre: Jazz
- Label: Roost; RLP 2245
- Producer: Teddy Reig

Sonny Stitt chronology
Previously Unreleased Recordings (1960)	Sonny Side Up (1961)	The Sensual Sound of Sonny Stitt (1961)

Professional ratings
Review scores
Source	Rating
Allmusic	3/5 stars

Sonny Side Up is an album by saxophonist Sonny Stitt recorded in 1960 and originally released on the Roost label.

== Reception ==
The Allmusic site awarded the album 3 stars.

== Track listing ==
All compositions by Sonny Stitt except as indicated

1. "Sonny Side Up" - 2:36
2. "On Green Dolphin Street" (Bronisław Kaper, Ned Washington) - 3:56
3. "The More I See You" (Harry Warren, Mack Gordon) - 3:43
4. "Don't Take Your Love from Me" (Henry Nemo) - 4:47
5. "My Blue Heaven" (Walter Donaldson, George A. Whiting) - 2:43
6. "My Mother's Eyes" (Abel Baer, L. Wolfe Gilbert) - 3:51
7. "When I Grow Too Old to Dream" (Oscar Hammerstein II, Sigmund Romberg) - 3:05
8. "Bye Bye Blues" (Fred Hamm, Dave Bennett, Bert Lown, Chauncey Gray) - 5:04
9. "I've Got the World on a String" (Harold Arlen, Ted Koehler) - 5:14

== Personnel ==
- Sonny Stitt - alto saxophone, tenor saxophone
- Jimmy Jones - piano
- Aaron Bell - bass
- Roy Haynes - drums
