= The Sensual Sound of Sonny Stitt =

Studio album by Sonny Stitt with Ralph Burns Strings
- Released: 1961
- Recorded: March 6–7, 1961; New York City
- Genre: Jazz
- Label: Verve; V/V6 8451

Sonny Stitt chronology
Sonny Side Up (1960)	The Sensual Sound of Sonny Stitt (1961)	Sonny Stitt at the D. J. Lounge (1961)

Professional ratings
Review scores
Source	Rating
Allmusic	3/5 stars
Down Beat	4/5 stars

The Sensual Sound of Sonny Stitt is an album by saxophonist Sonny Stitt performing with Ralph Burns' orchestra recorded in 1961 and released on the Verve label.

== Reception ==
The Allmusic site awarded the album 3 stars.

== Track listing ==
All compositions by Sonny Stitt except as indicated

1. "Try a Little Tenderness" (Jimmy Campbell, Reg Connelly, Harry M. Woods) - 3:21
2. "Back to My Home Town" - 3:16
3. "All of You" (Cole Porter) - 3:37
4. "I Never Felt That Way" - 3:08
5. "World Really Isn't" - 2:55
6. "They Say It's Wonderful" (Irving Berlin) - 3:18
7. "Time After Time" (Sammy Cahn, Jule Styne) - 3:48
8. "I Love You" (Cole Porter) - 3:08
9. "Once in a While" (Michael Edwards, Bud Green) - 3:31
10. "Talk to Me" (Stanley Kahan, Eddie Snyder, Rudy Vallée) - 3:11

== Personnel ==
- Sonny Stitt - alto saxophone
- The Ralph Burns Strings - strings
- Orchestra arranged and conducted by Ralph Burns
- Murray Laden - cover photography
