= Gene Ammons in Sweden =

Live album by Gene Ammons
- Released: 1981
- Recorded: July 14, 1973
- Venue: Åhus Jazz Festival, Åhus, Sweden
- Genre: Jazz
- Label: Enja; Enja 3093
- Producer: Inge Dahl

Gene Ammons chronology
Gene Ammons and Friends at Montreux (1973)	Gene Ammons in Sweden (1981)	Together Again for the Last Time (1973)

Professional ratings
Review scores
Source	Rating
Allmusic	3/5 stars

Gene Ammons in Sweden is a live album by saxophonist Gene Ammons recorded in Åhus in 1973 and released on the Enja label in 1981.

== Reception ==
The Allmusic review states, "It's not that well recorded, but Ammons' playing is furious, funky, and riveting".

== Track listing ==
1. Billie's Bounce" (Charlie Parker) – 11:25
2. "There Is No Greater Love" (Isham Jones, Marty Symes) – 8:35
3. "Polka Dots and Moonbeams" (Johnny Burke, Jimmy Van Heusen) – 4:58
4. "Lover Man" (Jimmy Davis, Ram Ramirez, James Sherman) – 5:35
5. "Ahus Jazz" (Horace Parlan) – 7:55

== Personnel ==
- Gene Ammons – tenor saxophone
- Horace Parlan – piano
- Red Mitchell – bass
- Ed Jones – drums
