= Bel-Tone Records =

American independent record label (founded 1944)

Bel-Tone Recording Corporation was a small American independent record label founded in 1944 in Hollywood, California, that recorded and produced artists of the pop, race, and folk genres.

== Recording artists ==
- Frankie Laine (né Francesco Paolo LoVecchio; 1913–2007)
- Freddy Stewart (né Morris Joseph Lazar; 1921–2000)
- Valaida Snow (1902–1956)
- Cliffe Stonehead (aka Cliffie Stone; né Clifford Gilpin Snyder; 1917–1998)
- Monte Hale (né Buren Ely; 1919–2009)
- Buzz Adlam (né Basil George Adlam; 1904–1974)
- Alton Redd (1904–1979)
- Bob Mosely
- Slim Gaillard (né Bulee Gaillard; 1916–1991)
- Tin Ear Tanner and his Back Room Boys (pseudonym for Merle Travis, Cliffie Stone, and "crew")
- Luis Cardenas "Touch of Paradise" (2016)

== Management ==
Dick Elwell was President and general manager; Jack Elliott (né Irwin Elliott Zucker; 1927–2001) as songwriter and talent manager; Frank Berger, who had formerly been with Gilt-Edge Records, as production supervisor; and Jack Homer as flack.

Bel-Tone had acquired a recording studio from James Anthony Fitzpatrick (1894–1980), who had used it to produce short travel films called, Fitzpatrick Traveltalks. The studio turned out to be not large enough to accommodate many of the ensembles that the label was pursuing; so, the label used two or three established commercial studios in Los Angeles.

Luis Cardenas and Owen Loftus have recently purchased the Hollywood Independent label. The intent is to sign "unique artists". Studios used for recording will consist of LunchBox Studios, Capitol Records, The Village and others depending on what the project requires. Luis Cardenas "Touch of Paradise" is the first project to be released by the label in about 15 years. Luis Cardenas will produce and oversee projects at studios such as Capitol Records, LunchBox Studios, Dino M111 Studios, The Village and Paramount Studios.

Luis Cardenas is vice president and head of A&R for Bel-Tone Records. Also producing and artist development. Luis Cardenas freelances as Producer on other projects for other Indie labels as well.

Owen Loftus is CEO and President of Bel-Tone Records and Executive Producer on key projects. Owen Loftus has also been named as executive director of all Film Rights and Productions of 8 Land Pictures Inc. which is operating in conjunction with Bel Tone Films.

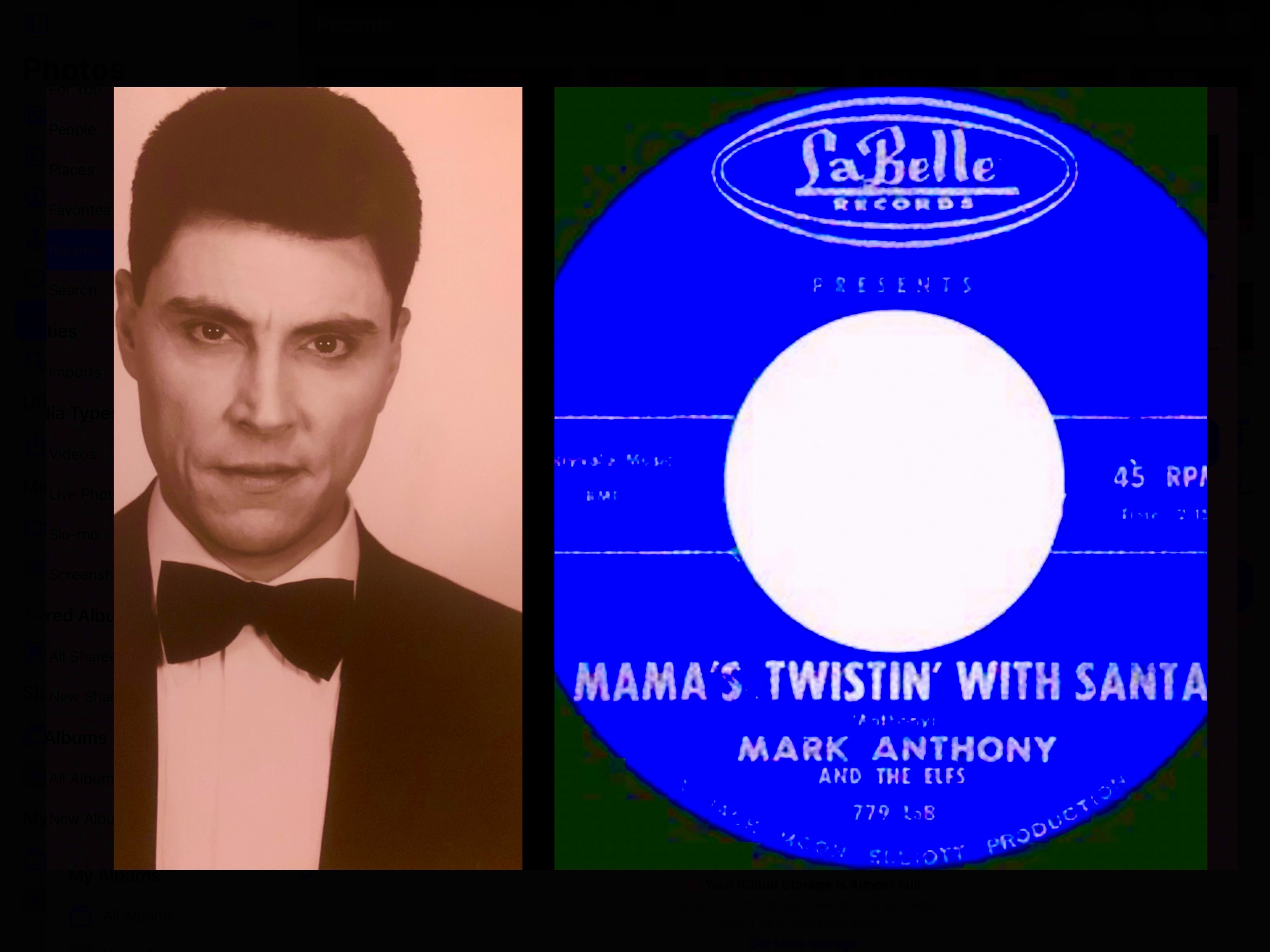
MAMA’S TWISTIN’ WITH SANTA, by MARK ANTHONY, on the alternate label Labelle, in 1963 (was produced by Jack Elliott).

== Series ==
0250 series – jazz/pop, then switched to country
J750 series – jazz & R&B
2000 series – Latin
7000 series – pop
9000 series
Charlie Parker & Dizzy Gillespie recorded in Hollywood, California, December 29, 1945, on the 700 series with Slim Gaillard, Dodo Marmarosa, Jack McVea, Bam Brown, and Zutty Singleton

Kidisks — Bel-Tone Playhouse Series

- The Ugly Duckling, 78 rpm (1945)

Starring Mary Holiday, with "Jump Jump"

- Jump Jump | The Little Lost Star
- BT-4: 10" 78 rpm — re-issued in 1947 by Mercury Records MMP–16 (album), 7031 (sides 1, 2), 7031 (sides 3, 4), 7033 (sides 5, 6)

Uncle Bob (narrator) ... Robert Bainter Bailey (1913–1983)
Music, conducting ... Raymond Joe Sanns (né Joseph Milton Mullendore Jr.; 1914–1990), who also was a member of the Cappy Barra Harmonica Band
Director ... by Ted B. Sills

The Fisherman and the Flounder (3 sides), adopted from Grimm's Fairy Tales, OCLC 45308491 image

Actors: Dick Trusel, Shirley Mitchell, Ken Christy

The Elves and the Shoemaker (3 sides), adopted from Grimm's Fairy Tales, OCLC 80130809

Actors: Henry Lang, Shirley Mitchell (maiden; born 1919; married to & divorced from Julian H. Frieden; later married to and widow of Jay Livingston), Jack Edwards, Jr., Kee Christy

- Sleepy Slim The Tired Lion, re-issued by Mercury Records MMP–17, 7034, 7034

Starring Mary McConnell and Jump Jump
Sound effects & music ... Harry Wilcox

== Bankruptcy ==
Bel-Tone Records, through its attorney Samuel Shayon (né Samuel Shmayonik; 1903–1984), filed for bankruptcy on November 30, 1947. Dick Elwell and Bob Cook were the sole shareholders.

- Gold Seal Record Company, a small independent label from Chicago, acquired most its folk and country masters.
- Majestic Records acquired the 1946 recording sessions of Slim Gaillard.

Luis Cardenas and Owen Loftus acquired the Bel Tone name in efforts to revise Bel Tone Records, Production and Entertainment Group.
