= Groovin' with Jug =

Live album by Richard Holmes and Gene Ammons
- Released: 1961
- Recorded: August 15, 1961; The Black Orchid, Los Angeles, California
- Genre: Jazz
- Length: 54:32
- Label: Pacific Jazz; PJ 32
- Producer: Richard Bock

Richard Holmes chronology
Groove (1961)	Groovin' with Jug (1961)	Somethin' Special (1962)

Gene Ammons chronology
Jug (1961)	Groovin' with Jug (1961)	Dig Him! (1961)

Professional ratings
Review scores
Source	Rating
AllMusic	4.5/5 stars
Down Beat	2.5/5 stars
The Rolling Stone Jazz Record Guide	4/5 stars

Groovin' with Jug is a live album (with three tracks recorded in the studio) by organist Richard Holmes and saxophonist Gene Ammons recorded in 1961 and released on the Pacific Jazz label.

== Reception ==
The Allmusic review called it an "excellent album, which finds Ammons and Richard "Groove" Holmes co-leading a soul-jazz/hard bop organ combo... three of the eight selections were produced by Richard Bock in a Los Angeles studio in the afternoon, while the other five were recorded several hours later an L.A. club called the Black Orchid. Ammons and Holmes prove to be a strong combination in both settings, although their playing is somewhat looser at the Orchid".

== Track listing ==
All compositions by Gene Ammons except as indicated

1. "Good Vibrations" (Art Farmer) - 8:38
2. "Willow Weep for Me" (Ann Ronell) - 7:04
3. "Juggin' Around" (Frank Foster) - 3:20
4. "Hittin' the Jug" - 7:20 Bonus track on CD reissue
5. "Exactly Like You" (Dorothy Fields, Jimmy McHugh) - 9:05 Bonus track on CD reissue
6. "Groovin' With Jug" - 4:19
7. "Morris the Minor" (Richard Holmes) - 7:53
8. "Hey You, What's That?" - 6:53
- Recorded in studio on the afternoon of August 15, 1961 (tracks 6–8) and at The Black Orchid on the evening of August 15, 1961 (tracks 1–5)

== Personnel ==
- Gene Ammons - tenor saxophone
- Richard Holmes - organ
- Gene Edwards - guitar
- Leroy Henderson - drums
