= Betty Hall Jones =

American jazz musician (1911–2009)

Betty Hall Jones (January 11, 1911 – April 20, 2009), was an American boogie-woogie pianist, singer, songwriter and arranger.

== Biography ==
She was born Cordell Elizabeth Bigbee in Topeka, Kansas. Archie Bigbee, her father, was a part-time cornetist and leader of a brass band. Music ran through her family. She learned piano from her uncle in California, where she was raised after her family moved there in 1921. She learned piano, starting at the age of five, going through her first year of college. A Las Vegas Columnist once described Betty Hall Jones as a "tiny 70-year-old black songstress-pianist who tore up the joint."

Around 1927, she married a banjoist, George Hall, and then had two children but divorced after a few years. In 1936, as Betty Hall, she got a job as a backup pianist for Buster Moten in Kansas City. She returned to Los Angeles to play with Roy Milton from 1937 through 1941, then joined Luke Jones' trio, with whom she recorded. Additionally, she was also the co-leader of the Satin Dolls, a group of musicians, Dixieland. She married Jasper Jones in the early part of the decade, taking the name Betty Hall Jones. By 1942 she had joined Paul Howard's Quality Serenaders as pianist and arranger, but also led her own Betty Hall Jones Trio in clubs and hotels, mostly in southern California where she was raising her children. Her family did not approve of the type of music that she was involved in. She died in Torrance, California, in 2009, aged 98.

== Career ==
In 1946 she wrote songs recorded by Alton Redd's band, and, with Luke Jones, recorded with Joe Alexander's Highlanders on the Atlas label. She also recorded under her own name in 1947 for Atomic Records, leading a group that included Jones and, on some recordings, saxophonist Maxwell Davis. She signed for Capitol Records in 1949, and released a string of singles on the label including "This Joint's Too Hip For Me", probably her best-known recording. As a writer, her songs were recorded by Ray Charles ("Ain't That Fine") and Nellie Lutcher ("My New Papa's Got To Have Everything"). However, her own recordings were not chart hits. She left the Capitol label the following year, but continued to perform widely, and recorded for the Dootone and Combo labels in the early 1950s. She worked at the Hotel Sorrento in Seattle, Washington, for seven years, and became noted for the flamboyant hats which she wore while performing, switching from one to another between songs. Betty performed a large number of shows for charity. She performed charity shows for the USO and routinely performed for nursing homes.

A compilation of her recordings, The Complete Recordings 1947-1954, was issued in 2005.

She was the mother of two children, and married, then divorced, George Hal. She professed to admire Mary Lou Williams, Art Tatum, Teddy Wilson, Fats Waller, Pete Johnson, and Duke Ellington as influences and peers.

== Tours ==
In the 1960s and 1970s she did USO tours in East Asia and toured Australia and Mexico in addition to regular dates in nightclubs on Sunset Boulevard. She toured Sweden and England in the 1980s, and continued performing into the 1990s despite illness. In the 1950s she extended her itinerary from Canada to the Southwest.
