= Count Your Blessings (Reginald Morgan & Edith Temple song) =

"Count Your Blessings" is a song composed c. 1946 by Reginald Dudley Morgan (1900-1981), with lyrics by Edith Temple, a pseudonym adopted by British songwriter Joseph Murrells (1904-1985). It has been performed by Gene Ammons, Holly Cole, Gracie Fields, Aled Jones, Garrison Keillor, Josef Locke, The Luton Girls Choir, Dana, Phillip McCann, among others.
