= Gene Ammons =

American tenor saxophonist (1925–1974)

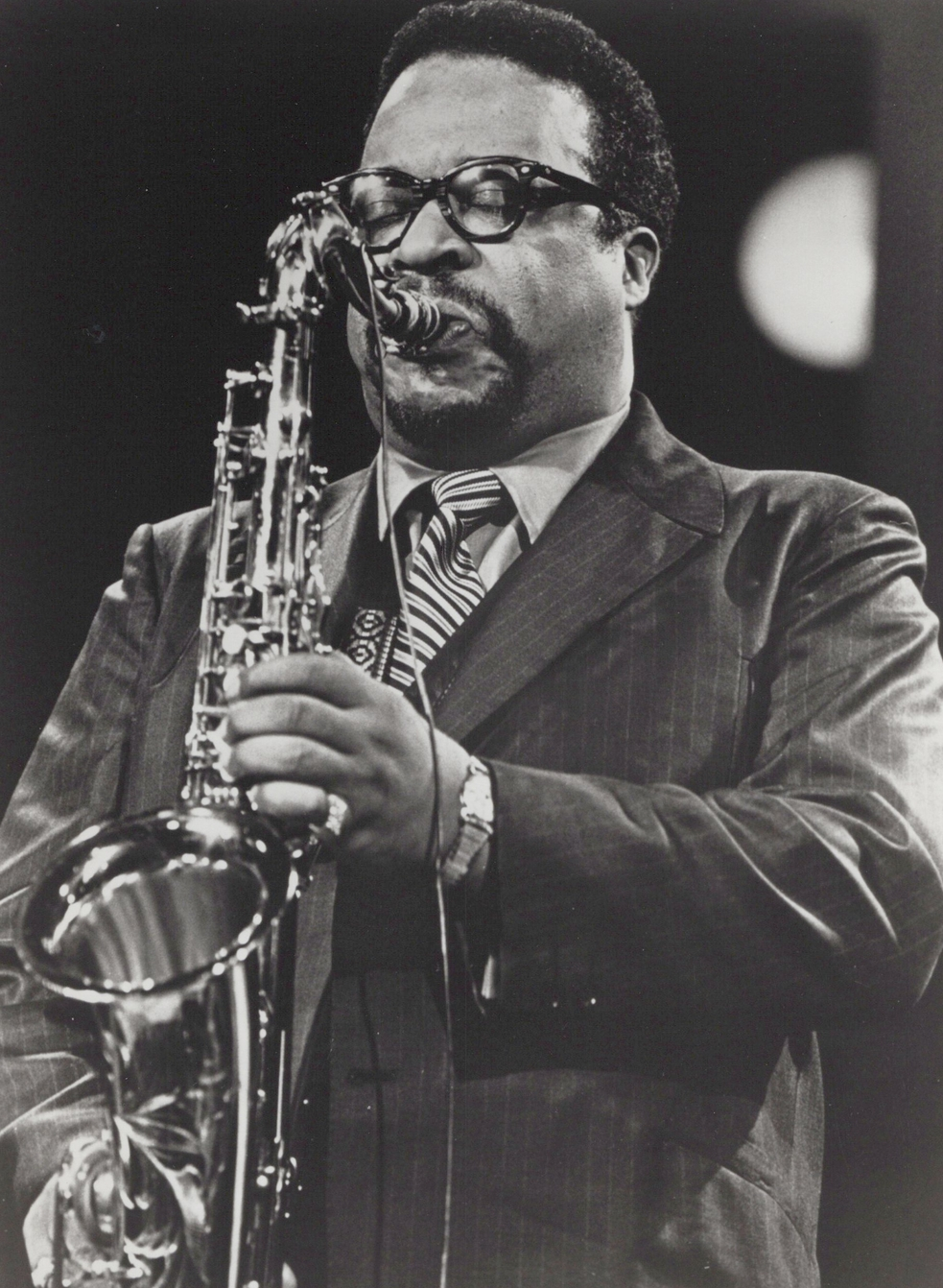

Background information
- Also known as: "Jug", "The Boss"
- Born: Eugene Ammons; April 14, 1925; Chicago, Illinois, United States
- Died: August 6, 1974 (aged 49) Chicago, Illinois, United States
- Genres: Jazz
- Occupation: Musician
- Instrument: Tenor saxophone
- Years active: 1943–1974

Eugene "Jug" Ammons (April 14, 1925 – August 6, 1974), also known as "The Boss", was an American jazz tenor saxophonist. The son of boogie-woogie pianist Albert Ammons, Gene Ammons is remembered for his accessible music, steeped in soul and R&B.

== Biography ==
Born in Chicago, Illinois, Ammons studied music with instructor Walter Dyett at DuSable High School. Ammons began to gain recognition while still at high school when in 1943, at the age of 18, he went on the road with trumpeter King Kolax's band. In 1944, he joined the band of Billy Eckstine (who bestowed on him the nickname "Jug" when straw hats ordered for the band did not fit), playing alongside Charlie Parker and later Dexter Gordon. Performances from this period include "Blowin' the Blues Away," featuring a saxophone duel between Ammons and Gordon. After 1947, when Eckstine became a solo performer, Ammons then led a group, including Miles Davis and Sonny Stitt, that performed at Chicago's Jumptown Club. In 1949, Ammons replaced Stan Getz as a member of Woody Herman's Second Herd, and then in 1950 formed a duet with Sonny Stitt.

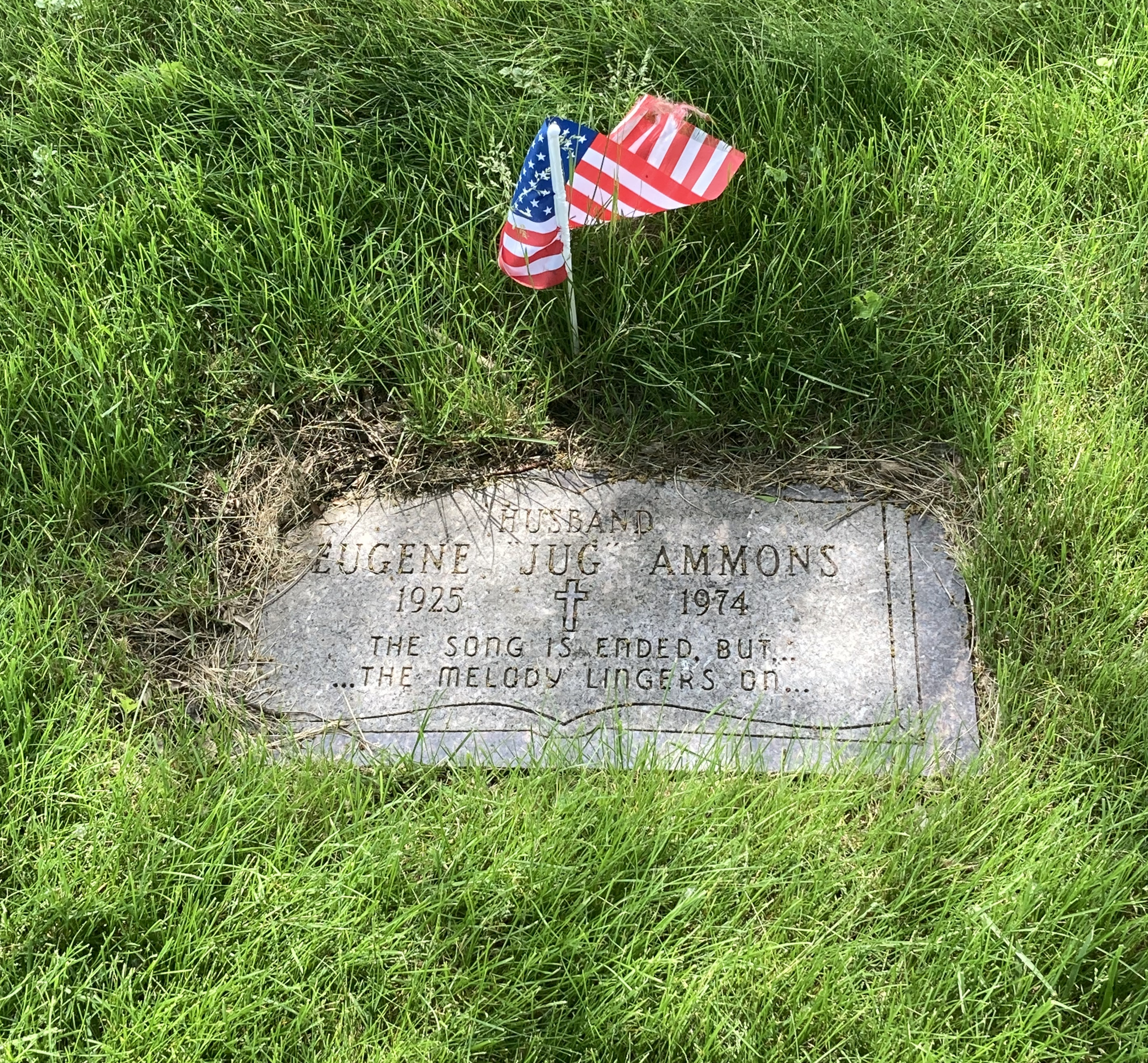
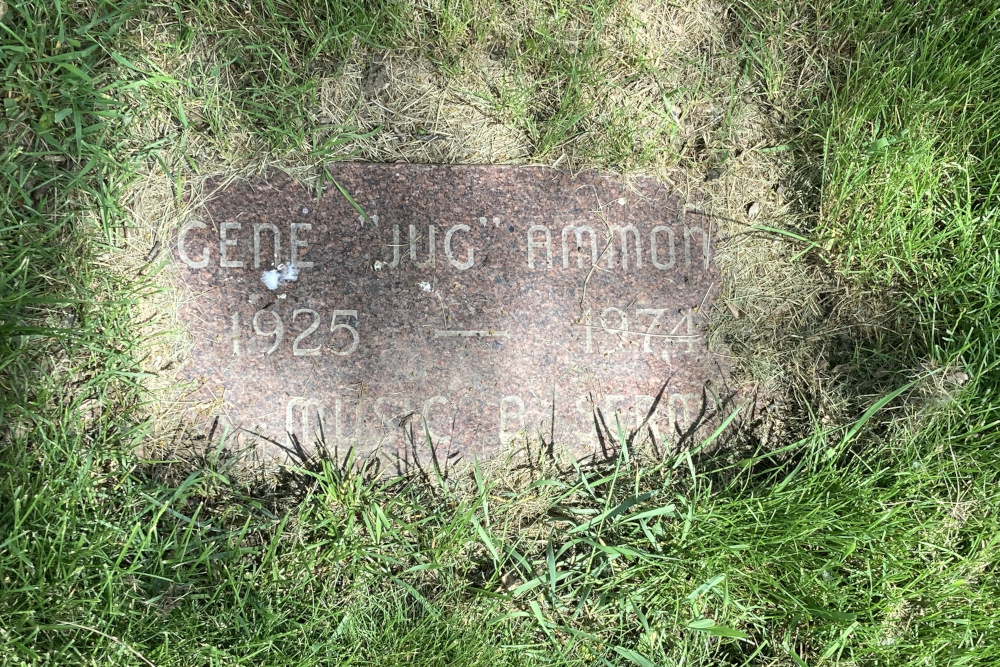
Two stones at Ammons' grave in Lincoln Cemetery

The 1950s were a prolific period for Ammons and produced some acclaimed recordings such as The Happy Blues (1956). Musicians who played in his groups, apart from Stitt, included Donald Byrd, Jackie McLean, John Coltrane, Kenny Burrell, Mal Waldron, Art Farmer, and Duke Jordan.

His later career was interrupted by two prison sentences for narcotics possession, the first from 1958 to 1960, the second from 1962 to 1969. He recorded as a leader for Mercury (1947–1949), Aristocrat (1948–1950), Chess (1950–1951), Prestige (1950–1952), Decca (1952), and United (1952–1953). For the rest of his career, he was affiliated with Prestige. After his release from prison in 1969, having served a seven-year sentence at Joliet penitentiary, he signed the largest contract ever offered at that time by Prestige's Bob Weinstock.

Ammons had the first of two records released by Leonard Chess on the newly-formed Chess Records label in 1950, titled "My Foolish Heart" (Chess 1425); Muddy Waters was the second record, "Rolling Stone" (Chess 1426). Both records were released simultaneously.

Ammons died in Chicago on August 6, 1974, at the age of 49, from bone cancer and pneumonia. He was buried at Lincoln Cemetery in Blue Island, Illinois.

== Playing style ==
Ammons and Von Freeman were the founders of the Chicago school of tenor saxophone. Ammons's playing style showed influences from Lester Young as well as Ben Webster. These artists had helped develop the sound of the tenor saxophone to higher levels of expressiveness. Ammons, together with Dexter Gordon and Sonny Stitt, helped integrate their developments with the emerging "vernacular" of the bebop movement, and the chromaticism and rhythmic variety of Charlie Parker is evident in his playing.

While adept at the technical aspects of bebop, in particular its love of harmonic substitutions, Ammons stayed in touch with the commercial blues and R&B of his day. For example, in 1950 the saxophonist's recording of "My Foolish Heart" made Billboard Magazine's black pop charts. The soul jazz movement of the mid-1960s, often using the combination of tenor saxophone and Hammond B3 electric organ, counts him as a founder. With a thicker, warmer tone than Stitt or Gordon, Ammons could at will exploit a vast range of textures on the instrument, vocalizing it in ways that anticipated later artists such as Stanley Turrentine, Houston Person, and even Archie Shepp. Ammons showed little interest, however, in the modal jazz of John Coltrane, Joe Henderson or Wayne Shorter that was emerging at the same time.

== Discography ==
=== As leader/co-leader ===
- Soulful Saxophone (Chess 1442, 1948–51 [1959]) reissued as Makes It Happen (Cadet 783, 1967)
- All Star Sessions (Prestige 7050, 1950–51 + 1955 [1956])
- The Happy Blues (Prestige 7039, 1956)
- Jammin' with Gene (Prestige 7060, 1956)
- Funky (Prestige 7083, 1957)
- Jammin' in Hi Fi with Gene Ammons (Prestige 7110, 1957)
- The Big Sound (Prestige 7132, 1958)
- Groove Blues (Prestige 7201, 1958 [1961])
- Blue Gene (Prestige 7146, 1958)
- Boss Tenor (Prestige 7180, 1960)
- Nice an' Cool (Moodsville MV-18, 1961)
- Jug (Prestige 7192, 1961)
- Just Jug [live] (Argo 698, 1961 [1962])
- Up Tight! (Prestige 7208, 1961)
- Boss Soul! (Prestige 7445, 1961 [1963])
- Twisting the Jug with Joe Newman, Jack McDuff (Prestige 7238, 1961)
- Soul Summit Vol. 2 with Etta Jones, Jack McDuff (Prestige 7275, 1961–62 [1963])
- Late Hour Special (Prestige 7287, 1961–62 [1964])
- The Soulful Moods of Gene Ammons (Moodsville MV-28, 1962 [1963])
- Blue Groove (Prestige MPP-2514, 1962 [1982])
- Preachin' (Prestige 7270, 1962)
- Jug & Dodo with Dodo Marmarosa (Prestige 24021, 1962 [1972]) 2-LP
- Velvet Soul (Prestige 7320, 1960–62 [1964])
- Angel Eyes (Prestige 7369, 1960–62 [1965])
- Sock! (Prestige 7400, 1954–55 + 1962 [1965])
- Bad! Bossa Nova (Prestige 7257, 1962) reissued as Jungle Soul! (Ca' Purange) (Prestige 7552, 1968)
- The Boss Is Back! (Prestige 7739, 1969)
- Brother Jug! (Prestige 7792, 1969 [1970])
- Night Lights (Prestige 7862, 1970 [1985])
- The Chase! with Dexter Gordon [live] (Prestige 10010, 1970)
- The Black Cat! (Prestige 10006, 1970 [1971])
- My Way (Prestige 10022, 1971)
- Chicago Concert with James Moody (Prestige 10065, 1971 [1973])
- Free Again (Prestige 10040, 1972)
- Got My Own (Prestige 10058, 1972 [1973])
- Big Bad Jug (Prestige 10070, 1972 [1973])
- Gene Ammons and Friends at Montreux (Prestige 10078, 1973)
- Gene Ammons in Sweden (Enja 3093, 1973 [1981])
- Brasswind (Prestige 10080, 1974)
- Goodbye (Prestige 10093, 1974 [1975])
- Swinging the Jugg (Roots 1002, 1970 [1976])

As co-leader with Sonny Stitt

- Kaleidoscope (Prestige 7077, 1950–52 [1957])
- Boss Tenors: Straight Ahead from Chicago – August 1961 (Verve 8426, 1962)
- Boss Tenors in Orbit! (Verve 8468, 1962)
- Dig Him! (Argo 697, 1962) reissued as We'll Be Together Again (Prestige 7606, 1969)
- Soul Summit (Prestige 7234, 1962)
- You Talk That Talk! (Prestige 10019, 1971)
- God Bless Jug and Sonny [live] (Prestige 11019, 1973 [2001])
- Left Bank Encores [live] (Prestige 11022, 1973 [2002])
- Together Again for the Last Time (Prestige 10100, 1973 [1976])

=== As sideman ===
With Bennie Green

- Soul Stirrin' (Blue Note, 1958)
- The Swingin'est (Vee Jay, 1959)

With Richard "Groove" Holmes

- Groovin' with Jug (Pacific Jazz, 1961)
- Tell It Like It Is (Pacific Jazz, 1966)

With Howard McGhee

- House Warmin'! (Argo, 1963) – originally issued in 1962 on Winley Records as Nothin' But Soul under Gene Ammons' name.
- Maggie: The Savoy Sessions (Savoy, 1977)[2LP] – compilation. rec. 1948

With Jack McDuff

- Brother Jack Meets the Boss (Prestige, 1962)
- Rock Candy (Prestige, 1972)[2LP] – compilation

With others

- David Axelrod, Heavy Axe (Fantasy, 1974)
- Richard B. Boone, I've Got a Right to Sing (Nocturne, 1970)
- Miles Davis, Bopping the Blues (Black Lion, 1987) – rec. 1946
- Billy Eckstine, The Legendary Big Band (Savoy, 2002)[2CD] – anthology (all of Eckstine's recordings for the DeLuxe and National labels). rec. 1944–1947.
- Charles Mingus, Charles Mingus and Friends in Concert (Columbia, 1972)
- Andrew White, Red Top (Andrew's Music, 1977)
