= Satan (album) =

Studio album by Sonny Stitt
- Released: 1974
- Recorded: 1974; Sound Exchange Studios, New York City
- Genre: Jazz
- Length: 36:21
- Label: Cadet; CA 50060
- Producer: Esmond Edwards

Sonny Stitt chronology
Together Again for the Last Time (1973)	Satan (1974)	Never Can Say Goodbye (1975)

Satan is an album by saxophonist Sonny Stitt recorded in 1974 and released on the Cadet label.

== Track listing ==
All compositions by Roland Hanna except as indicated

1. "Satan" (Jon Lucien) - 4:13
2. "A Crazy Mixed Up World" - 3:45
3. "Big Bad Henry" - 6:31
4. "Gee, Baby, Ain't I Good to You" (Andy Razaf, Don Redman) - 1:53
5. "Will You Love Me Tomorrow" (Gerry Goffin, Carole King) - 5:50
6. "Anone" - 6:48
7. "It Might as Well Be Spring" (Oscar Hammerstein II, Richard Rodgers) - 4:50

== Personnel ==
- Sonny Stitt - alto saxophone
- Roland Hanna - electric piano (tracks 1–3, 5 & 6)
- Billy Butler (tracks 1 & 5), Elliott Randall (tracks 1, 3), John Tropea (track 3) - guitar
- Ron Carter - bass (tracks 4 & 7)
- Richard Davis (tracks 3 & 6), Gordon Edwards (tracks 1 & 5) - electric bass
- Jimmy Johnson - drums (tracks 1, 3, 5 & 6)
- Montego Joe (tracks 1 & 5), Norman Pride (tracks 3 & 6) - congas
- Kermit Moore - cello (track 2)
- Wade Marcus - arranger, conductor
