= The Big Sound (Gene Ammons album) =

Studio album by Gene Ammons
- Released: 1958
- Recorded: January 3, 1958
- Studio: Van Gelder Studio, Hackensack, New Jersey
- Genre: Jazz
- Length: 49:20
- Label: Prestige; PRLP 7132
- Producer: Bob Weinstock

Gene Ammons chronology
Jammin' in Hi Fi with Gene Ammons (1957)	The Big Sound (1958)	Groove Blues (1958)

Professional ratings
Review scores
Source	Rating
Allmusic	4/5 stars
The Penguin Guide to Jazz Recordings	3/4 stars

The Big Sound is an album by saxophonist Gene Ammons recorded in 1958 and released on the Prestige label. The album was recorded at the same sessions which produced Groove Blues.

== Reception ==
AllMusic reviewer Scott Yanow stated: "Ammons is easily the main star (he really excelled in this setting) and is in generally fine form".

== Track listing ==
1. "Blue Hymn" (Gene Ammons) – 12:37
2. "The Real McCoy" (Mal Waldron) – 8:33
3. "Cheek to Cheek" (Irving Berlin) – 14:12
4. "That's All" (Alan Brandt, Bob Haymes) – 13:58

== Personnel ==
- Gene Ammons – tenor saxophone
- Jerome Richardson – flute
- John Coltrane – alto saxophone (track 2)
- Paul Quinichette – tenor saxophone (track 2)
- Pepper Adams – baritone saxophone (tracks 2 & 4)
- Mal Waldron – piano
- George Joyner – bass
- Art Taylor – drums
