= Nice an' Cool =

Studio album by Gene Ammons
- Released: 1961
- Recorded: January 26, 1961
- Studio: Van Gelder Studio, Englewood Cliffs, NJ
- Genre: Jazz
- Length: 39:35
- Label: Moodsville; MV 18
- Producer: Esmond Edwards

Gene Ammons chronology
Boss Tenor (1960)	Nice an' Cool (1961)	Jug (1961)

Professional ratings
Review scores
Source	Rating
AllMusic	4/5 stars

Nice an' Cool is an album by saxophonist Gene Ammons recorded in 1961 and released on the Moodsville, a subsidiary label of Prestige.

== Reception ==
The AllMusic review stated: "A 1961 set of standards heavy on the ballads, Nice 'n Cool is prime Gene Ammons... Ammons' brilliantly soulful tenor saxophone really stretches out on the familiar melodies... Nice 'n Cool is first and foremost a mood album, with the unity of sound more important than the individual performances, but Ammons particularly shines."

== Track listing ==
1. "Till There Was You" (Meredith Willson) - 7:08
2. "Answer Me, My Love" (Fred Rauch, Gerhard Winkler) - 4:35
3. "Willow Weep for Me" (Ann Ronell) - 4:04
4. "Little Girl Blue" (Lorenz Hart, Richard Rodgers) - 4:55
5. "Something I Dreamed Last Night" (Sammy Fain, Herb Magidson, Jack Yellen) - 7:41
6. "Something Wonderful" (Oscar Hammerstein II, Richard Rodgers) - 3:03
7. "I Remember You" (Johnny Mercer, Victor Schertzinger) - 4:21
8. "Someone to Watch Over Me" (George Gershwin, Ira Gershwin) - 3:48

== Personnel ==
- Gene Ammons - tenor saxophone
- Richard Wyands - piano
- Doug Watkins - bass
- J.C. Heard - drums
