= Bennie Green =

American jazz trombonist (1923–1977)

- Born: April 16, 1923; Chicago, Illinois, U.S.
- Died: March 23, 1977 (aged 53) San Diego, California, U.S.
- Genres: Jazz
- Occupation: Musician
- Instrument: Trombone
- Years active: 1950s–1960s
- Labels: Prestige, Decca, Blue Note, Vee-Jay, Time, Bethlehem, Jazzland
- Formerly of: Charlie Ventura, Earl Hines

Bennie Green (April 16, 1923 – March 23, 1977) was an American jazz trombonist.

Born in Chicago, Illinois, United States, Green worked in the orchestras of Earl Hines and Charlie Ventura, and recorded as bandleader through the 1950s and 1960s. According to critic Scott Yanow of AllMusic, Green's style straddled swing music and soul, making him one of the few trombonists of the 1950s and '60s uninfluenced by the pioneering sound of J.J. Johnson.

Green relocated to Las Vegas, where he played in hotel bands for the last decade of his career, though he made occasional appearances at jazz festivals. He died on March 23, 1977.

== Discography ==
=== As leader ===
- Bennie Green Blows His Horn (Prestige, 1955)
- Bennie Green with Art Farmer (Prestige, 1956)
- Blow Your Horn (Decca, 1956)
- Walking Down (Prestige, 1956)
- Back on the Scene (Blue Note, 1958)
- Soul Stirrin' (Blue Note, 1958)
- The 45 Session (Blue Note, 1958)
- The Swingin'est (Vee Jay, 1959)
- Walkin' & Talkin' (Blue Note, 1959)
- Bennie Green Swings the Blues (Enrica, 1960)
- Glidin' Along (Jazzland, 1961)
- Hornful of Soul (Bethlehem, 1961)
- My Main Man (Argo, 1964) – with Sonny Stitt

=== As sideman ===
With Buck Clayton

- Jumpin' at the Woodside (Columbia, 1955)
- All the Cats Join In (Columbia, 1956)

With Miles Davis

- Blue Period,
- Miles Davis and Horns,

With Duke Ellington

- Second Sacred Concert (Fantasy, 1968)
- Up in Duke's Workshop (Pablo, 1979)

With Jo Jones

- The Jo Jones Special (Vanguard, 1955)
- Smooth Jazz (Everest, 1960)

With Ike Quebec

- Congo Lament (Blue Note, 1981)
- Easy Living (Blue Note, 1987)

With Sonny Stitt

- My Main Man (Argo, 1964)
- Pow! (Prestige, 1966)

With Kai Winding & J. J. Johnson

- Jazz Workshop Vol. 2: Trombone Rapport (Debut, 1955)
- Kai and Jay, Bennie Green with Strings (Prestige, 1956)
- Four Trombones (Debut, 1957) also with & Bennie Green & Willie Dennis

With others

- Count Basie, Basie Rides Again (Verve, 1961)
- George Benson, The George Benson Cookbook (Columbia, 1968)
- Booker Ervin, Booker 'n' Brass (Pacific Jazz, 1967)
- Sonny Criss, Intermission Riff (Pablo, 1988)
- Slim Gaillard, Opera in Vout (Verve, 1982)
- Earl Hines, Varieties! (Xanadu, 1985)
- Jackie & Roy, Jackie and Roy (Regent, 1957)
- Melba Liston, Melba Liston and Her 'Bones (Metrojazz, 1959)
- Howard McGhee, Dusty Blue (Parlophone, 1960)
- Cecil Payne, The Connection (Charlie Parker, 1962)
- Sarah Vaughan, Sarah Vaughan in Hi-Fi (Columbia, 1955)
- Charlie Ventura, It's All Bop to Me (RCA Victor, 1955)
- Charlie Ventura, Jumping with Ventura (EmArcy, 1955)
- Randy Weston, Destry Rides Again (United Artists, 1959)
- Joe Williams, Everyday I Have the Blues (Savoy, 1984)
