= Jazz =

Music genre

- Etymology: See: Jazz (word)
- Stylistic origins: Blues; ragtime (including classical ragtime); spirituals; folk; marches; European classical music; West African music
- Cultural origins: Late 19th century, New Orleans, U.S.
- Typical instruments: Double bass; drums; guitar; piano; saxophone; trumpet; clarinet; trombone; tuba; vocals; vibraphone; bass guitar; Hammond organ; flute; violin; bass clarinet; french horn; harmonica
- Derivative forms: Rock and roll; rock; jump blues; traditional pop; reggae; R&B; soul; ska; funk; hip-hop; house; lounge; contemporary R&B

Subgenres
- Subgenres: Avant-garde jazz; bebop; big band; chamber jazz; cool jazz; free jazz; gypsy jazz; hard bop; Latin jazz; mainstream jazz; modal jazz; M-Base; neo-bop; orchestral jazz; post-bop; progressive jazz; soul jazz; straight-ahead jazz; swing; third stream; traditional jazz; (complete list)

Fusion genres
- Fusion genres: Acid jazz; Afrobeat; Afro fusion; bluegrass; bossa nova; dansband; folk jazz; free funk; humppa; Indo jazz; jam band; jazzcore; jazz-funk; jazz fusion; jazz rap; kwela; mambo; Manila sound; nu jazz; neo soul; punk jazz; ska jazz; smooth jazz; swing revival; Western swing; world fusion

Regional scenes
- Regional scenes: Australia; Armenia; Azerbaijan; Balkans (Bulgaria); Baltimore; Belgium; Brazil; Canada; Chicago; Cuba; Denmark; Ethiopia; France; Germany; Haiti; India; Iran; Italy; Japan; Kansas City; Malawi; Mexico; Netherlands; New Orleans; New York City; Poland; South Africa (Cape jazz); Spain; Sweden; UK; U.S. West Coast; Washington, D.C.

Other topics
- Jazz clubs; Jazz poetry; Jazz standard; Jazz (word)

Jazz is a music genre that originated in the African-American communities of New Orleans, Louisiana, in the late 19th and early 20th centuries. Its roots are in blues, ragtime, European harmony, African rhythmic rituals, spirituals, hymns, marches, vaudeville song, and dance music. Since the 1920s Jazz Age, it has been recognized as a major form of musical expression in both traditional and popular music. Jazz is characterized by swing and blue notes, complex chords, call and response vocals, polyrhythms and improvisation.

As jazz spread around the world, it drew on national, regional, and local musical cultures, which gave rise to different styles. New Orleans jazz began in the early 1910s, combining earlier brass band marches, French quadrilles, biguine, ragtime and blues with collective polyphonic improvisation. However, jazz did not begin as a single musical tradition in New Orleans or elsewhere. In the 1930s, arranged dance-oriented swing big bands, Kansas City jazz (a hard-swinging, bluesy, improvisational style), and gypsy jazz (a style that emphasized musette waltzes) were the prominent styles. Bebop emerged in the 1940s, shifting jazz from danceable popular music toward a more challenging "musician's music" which was played at faster tempos and used more chord-based improvisation. Cool jazz developed near the end of the 1940s, introducing calmer, smoother sounds and long, linear melodic lines.

The mid-1950s saw the emergence of hard bop, which introduced influences from rhythm and blues, gospel, and blues to small groups and particularly to saxophone and piano. Modal jazz developed in the late 1950s, using the mode, or musical scale, as the basis of musical structure and improvisation, as did free jazz, which explored playing without regular meter, beat and formal structures. Jazz fusion appeared in the late 1960s and early 1970s, combining jazz improvisation with rock music's rhythms, electric instruments, and highly amplified stage sound. In the early 1980s, a commercial form of jazz fusion called smooth jazz became successful, garnering significant radio airplay. Other styles and genres abound in the 21st century, such as Latin and Afro-Cuban jazz.

== Etymology and definition ==
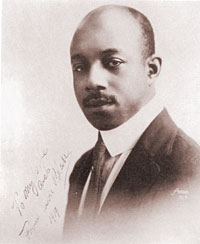
American jazz composer, lyricist, and pianist Eubie Blake made an early contribution to the genre's etymology.

The origin of the word jazz has been the subject of considerable research, and though aspects of its history are well documented, there are a few anecdotes that suggest the word was in use colloquially before it came to be associated strictly with music. It is believed to be related to jasm, a slang term dating back to 1860 meaning 'pep, energy'. The earliest written record of the word is in a 1912 article in the Los Angeles Times in which a minor league baseball pitcher, Ben Henderson of the Portland Beavers, described a pitch which he called a 'jazz ball' "because it wobbles and you simply can't do anything with it".

The use of the word in a musical context was documented as early as 1915 in the Chicago Daily Tribune. Its first documented use in a musical context in New Orleans was in a November 14, 1916, Times-Picayune article about "jas bands". In an interview with National Public Radio, musician Eubie Blake offered his recollections of the slang connotations of the term, saying: "When Broadway picked it up, they called it 'J-A-Z-Z'. It wasn't called that. It was spelled 'J-A-S-S'. That was dirty, and if you knew what it was, you wouldn't say it in front of ladies." The American Dialect Society named it the Word of the 20th Century.

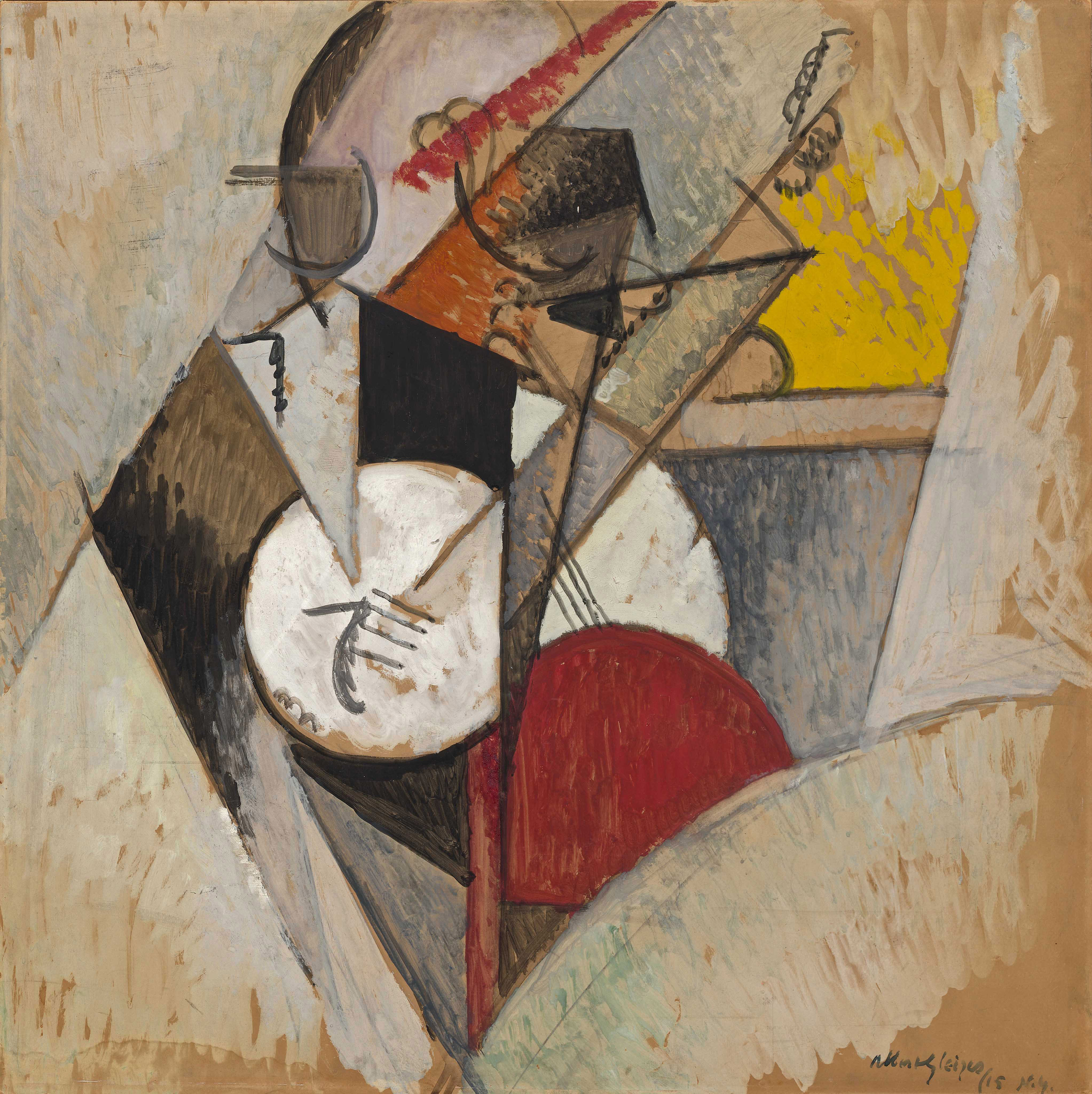
Albert Gleizes, 1915, Composition for "Jazz" from the Solomon R. Guggenheim Museum, New York

Jazz is difficult to define because it encompasses a wide range of music spanning a period of over 100 years, from ragtime to rock-infused fusion. Attempts have been made to define jazz from the perspective of other musical traditions, such as European music history or African music. But critic Joachim-Ernst Berendt argues that its terms of reference and its definition should be broader, defining jazz as a "form of art music which originated in the United States through the confrontation of the Negro with European music" and arguing that it differs from European music in that jazz has a "special relationship to time defined as 'swing'". Jazz involves "a spontaneity and vitality of musical production in which improvisation plays a role" and contains a "sonority and manner of phrasing which mirror the individuality of the performing jazz musician".

A broader definition that encompasses different eras of jazz has been proposed by Travis Jackson: "it is music that includes qualities such as swing, improvising, group interaction, developing an 'individual voice', and being open to different musical possibilities". Krin Gabbard argued that "jazz is a construct" which designates "a number of musics with enough in common to be understood as part of a coherent tradition". Duke Ellington, one of jazz's most famous figures, said, "It's all music."

== Elements ==
=== Improvisation ===
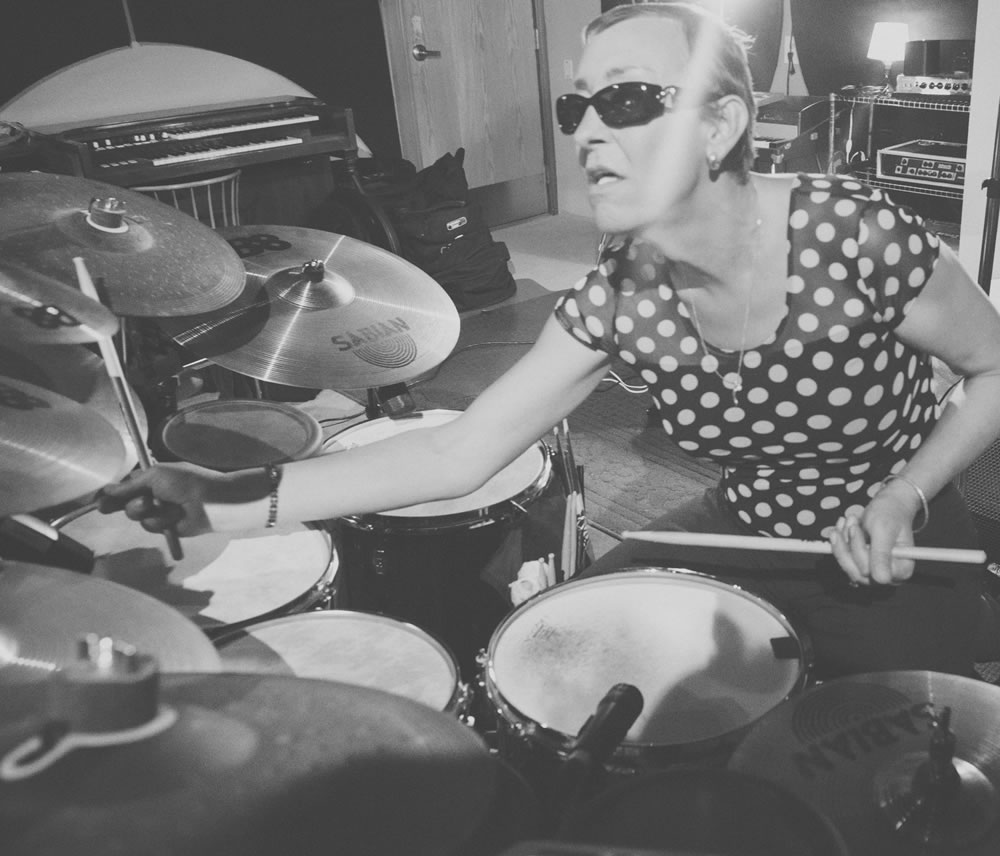
Billie Davies, an avant-garde jazz drummer

Although jazz is considered difficult to define, in part because it contains many subgenres, improvisation is one of its defining elements. The centrality of improvisation is attributed to the influence of earlier forms of music such as blues, a form of folk music which arose in part from the work songs and field hollers of African-American enslaved people on plantations. These work songs were commonly structured around a repetitive call-and-response pattern, but early blues was also improvisational. Classical music performance is evaluated more by its fidelity to the musical score, with less attention given to interpretation, ornamentation, and accompaniment. The classical performer's goal is to play the composition as it was written. In contrast, jazz is often characterized by the product of interaction and collaboration, placing less value on the contribution of the composer, if there is one, and more on the performer. The jazz performer interprets a tune in individual ways, never playing the same composition twice. Depending on the performer's mood, experience, and interaction with band members or audience members, the performer may change melodies, harmonies, and time signatures.

In early Dixieland, a.k.a. New Orleans jazz, performers took turns playing melodies and improvising countermelodies. In the swing era of the 1920s–1940s, big bands relied more on arrangements which were written or learned by ear and memorized. Soloists improvised within these arrangements. In the bebop era of the 1940s, big bands gave way to small groups and minimal arrangements in which the melody was stated briefly at the beginning and most of the piece was improvised. Modal jazz abandoned chord progressions to allow musicians to improvise even more. In many forms of jazz, a soloist is supported by a rhythm section of one or more chordal instruments (piano, guitar), double bass, and drums. The rhythm section plays chords and rhythms that outline the composition structure and complement the soloist. In avant-garde and free jazz, the separation of soloist and band is reduced, and there is license, or even a requirement, for the abandoning of chords, scales, and meters.

=== Traditionalism ===
Since the emergence of bebop, forms of jazz that are commercially oriented or influenced by popular music have been criticized. According to Bruce Johnson, there has always been a "tension between jazz as a commercial music and an art form". Regarding the Dixieland jazz revival of the 1940s, Black musicians rejected it as being shallow nostalgia entertainment for white audiences. On the other hand, traditional jazz enthusiasts have dismissed bebop, free jazz, and jazz fusion as forms of debasement and betrayal. An alternative view is that jazz can absorb and transform diverse musical styles. By avoiding the creation of norms, jazz allows avant-garde styles to emerge.

== Diversity in jazz ==
=== Jazz and race ===
For some African Americans, jazz has drawn attention to African-American contributions to culture and history. For others, jazz is a reminder of "an oppressive and racist society and restrictions on their artistic visions". Amiri Baraka argues that there is a "white jazz" genre that expresses whiteness. White jazz musicians appeared in the Midwest and in other areas throughout the U.S. Papa Jack Laine, who ran the Reliance band in New Orleans in the 1910s, was called "the father of white jazz". The Original Dixieland Jazz Band, whose members were white, were the first jazz group to record, and Bix Beiderbecke was one of the most prominent jazz soloists of the 1920s. The Chicago Style was developed by white musicians such as Eddie Condon, Bud Freeman, Jimmy McPartland, and Dave Tough. Others from Chicago such as Benny Goodman and Gene Krupa became leading members of swing during the 1930s. Many bands included both Black and white musicians. These musicians helped change attitudes toward race in the U.S.

=== Roles of women ===
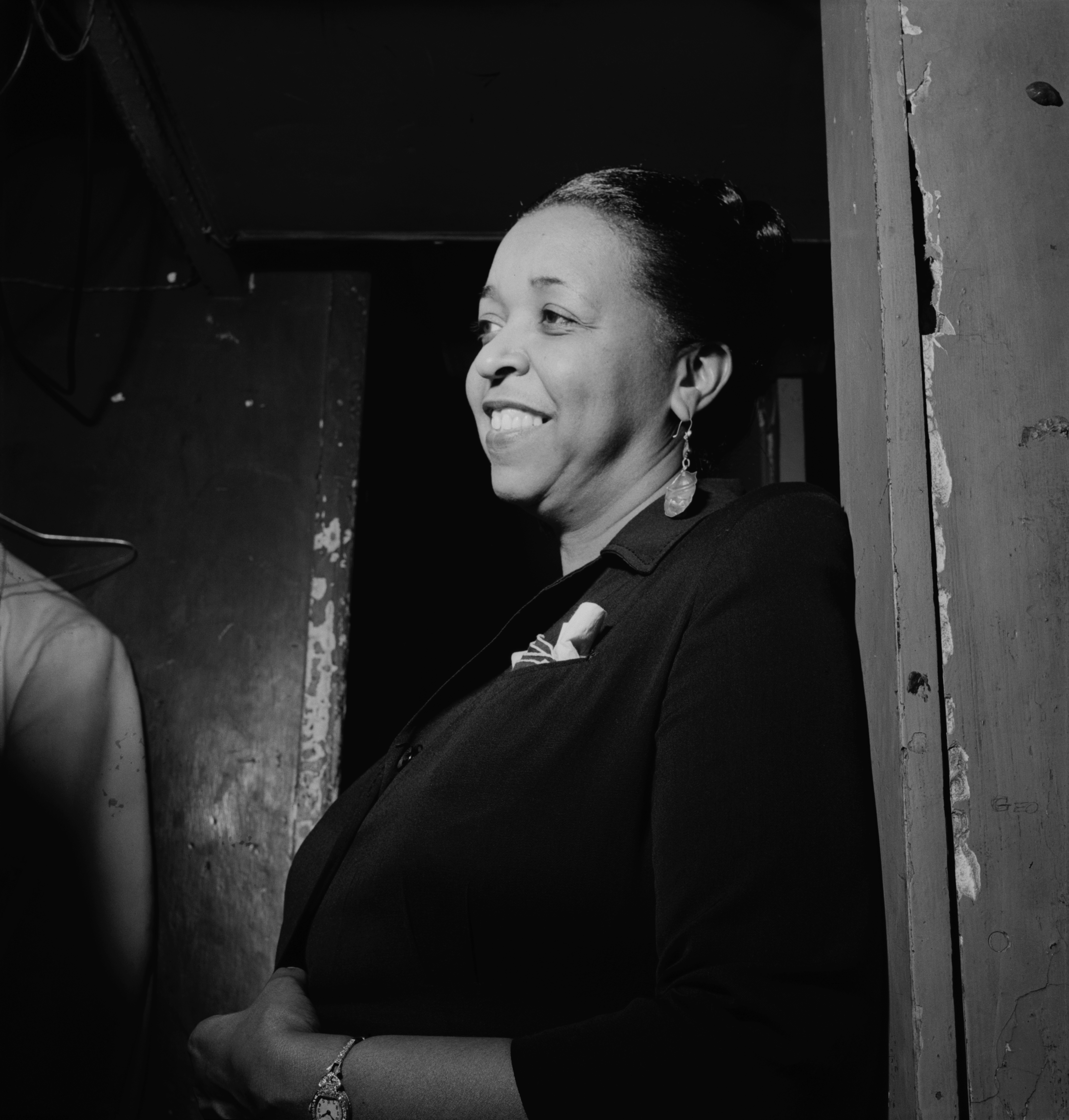
Ethel Waters sang "Stormy Weather" at the Cotton Club.

Female jazz performers and composers have contributed to jazz throughout its history. Although Betty Carter, Ella Fitzgerald, Adelaide Hall, Billie Holiday, Peggy Lee, Abbey Lincoln, Anita O'Day, Dinah Washington, and Ethel Waters were recognized for their vocal talent, less familiar were bandleaders, composers, and instrumentalists such as pianist Lil Hardin Armstrong, trumpeter Valaida Snow, and songwriters Irene Higginbotham and Dorothy Fields. Women began playing instruments in jazz in the early 1920s, drawing particular recognition on piano.

When male jazz musicians were drafted during World War II, many all-female bands replaced them. The International Sweethearts of Rhythm, which was founded in 1937, was a popular band that became the first all-female integrated band in the U.S. and the first to travel with the USO, touring Europe in 1945. Women were members of the big bands of Woody Herman and Gerald Wilson. Beginning in the 1950s, many women jazz instrumentalists were prominent, some sustaining long careers. Some of the most distinctive improvisers, composers, and bandleaders in jazz have been women. Trombonist Melba Liston is acknowledged as the first female horn player to work in major bands and to make a real impact on jazz, not only as a musician but also as a respected composer and arranger, particularly through her collaborations with Randy Weston from the late 1950s into the 1990s.

=== Jews in jazz ===
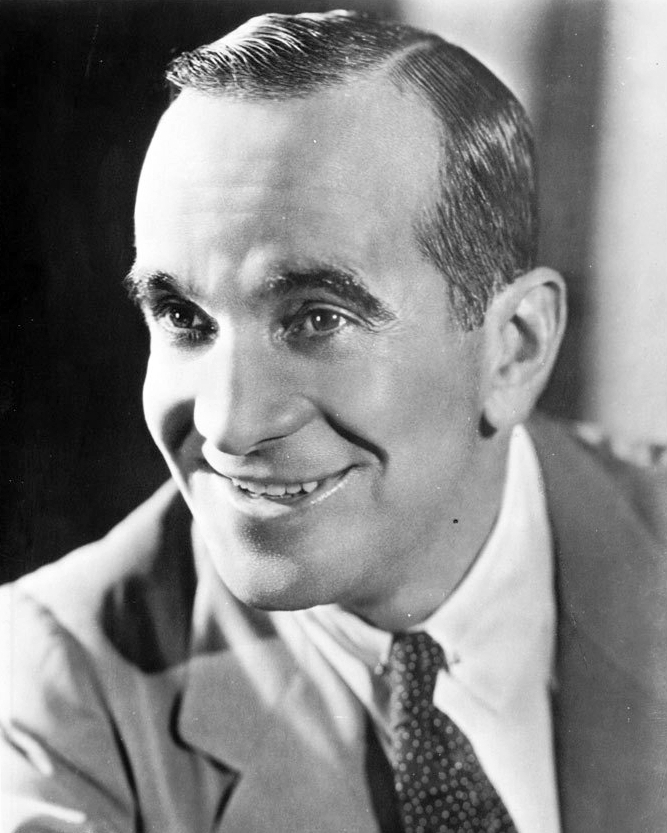
Al Jolson in 1925

Jewish Americans played a significant role in jazz. As jazz spread, it developed to encompass many different cultures, and the work of Jewish composers in Tin Pan Alley helped shape the many different sounds that jazz came to incorporate.

Jewish Americans were able to thrive in jazz because of the probationary whiteness that they were allotted at the time. George Bornstein wrote that African Americans were sympathetic to the plight of the Jewish American and vice versa. As disenfranchised minorities themselves, Jewish composers of popular music saw themselves as natural allies with African Americans.

The Jazz Singer with Al Jolson is one example of how Jewish Americans were able to bring jazz, music that African Americans developed, into popular culture. Benny Goodman was a vital Jewish American to the progression of jazz. Goodman was the leader of a racially integrated band named King of Swing. His jazz concert in the Carnegie Hall in 1938 was the first ever to be played there. The concert was described by Bruce Eder as "the single most important jazz or popular music concert in history".

Shep Fields also helped to popularize sweet jazz through his appearances and big band remote broadcasts from such landmark venues as Chicago's Palmer House, Broadway's Paramount Theater and the Starlight Roof at the famed Waldorf-Astoria Hotel. He entertained audiences with a light elegant musical style which remained popular with audiences for nearly three decades from the 1930s until the late 1950s.

== Early development ==
Jazz originated in the late-19th to early-20th century. It developed out of many forms of music, including blues, ragtime, European harmony, African rhythmic rituals, spirituals, hymns, marches, vaudeville song, and dance music. It also incorporated interpretations of American and European classical music, entwined with African and slave folk songs and the influences of West African culture. Its composition and style have changed many times throughout the years with each performer's personal interpretation and improvisation, which is also one of the greatest appeals of the genre.

=== Blended African and European music sensibilities ===
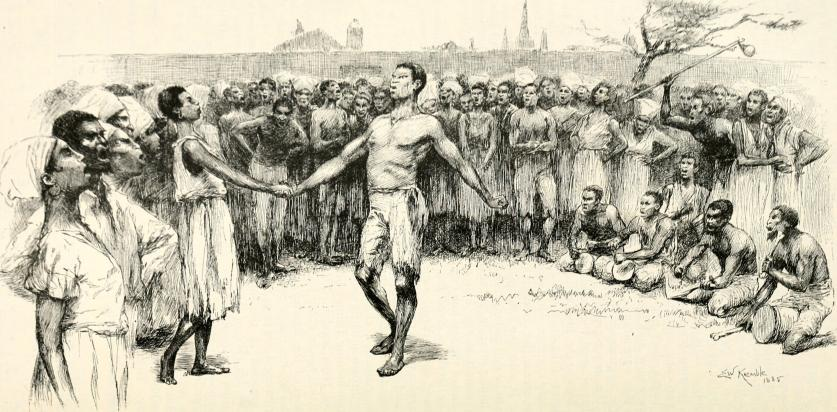
Dance in Congo Square in the late 1700s, artist's conception by E. W. Kemble from a century later

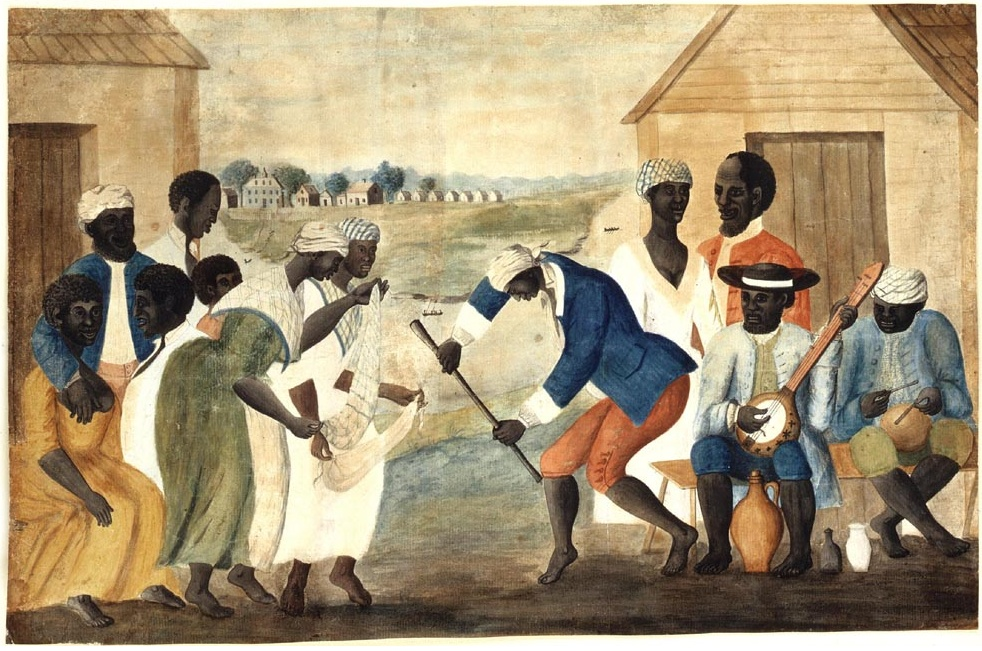
The late 18th-century painting The Old Plantation, possibly depicting African-Americans on a South Carolina plantation dancing to percussion and a banjo

By the 18th century, enslaved people in the New Orleans area gathered socially at a special market, in an area which later became known as Congo Square, famous for its African dances.

By 1866, the Atlantic slave trade had brought nearly 400,000 Africans to North America. The enslaved people came largely from West Africa and the greater Congo River basin and brought strong musical traditions with them. The African traditions primarily use a single-line melody and call-and-response pattern, and the rhythms have a counter-metric structure and reflect African speech patterns.

An 1885 account says that they were making strange music (Creole) on an equally strange variety of 'instruments'—washboards, washtubs, jugs, boxes beaten with sticks or bones and a drum made by stretching skin over a flour-barrel.

Lavish festivals with African-based dances to drums were organized on Sundays at Place Congo, or Congo Square, in New Orleans until 1843. There are historical accounts of other music and dance gatherings elsewhere in the southern United States. Robert Palmer said of percussive slave music:

Usually such music was associated with annual festivals, when the year's crop was harvested and several days were set aside for celebration. As late as 1861, a traveler in North Carolina saw dancers dressed in costumes that included horned headdresses and cow tails and heard music provided by a sheepskin-covered "gumbo box", apparently a frame drum; triangles and jawbones furnished the auxiliary percussion. There are quite a few [accounts] from the southeastern states and Louisiana dating from the period 1820–1850. Some of the earliest [Mississippi] Delta settlers came from the vicinity of New Orleans, where drumming was never actively discouraged for very long and homemade drums were used to accompany public dancing until the outbreak of the Civil War.

Another influence came from the harmonic style of hymns of the church, which Black enslaved people had learned and incorporated into their own music as spirituals. The origins of the blues are undocumented, though they can be seen as the secular counterpart of the spirituals. However, as Gerhard Kubik points out, whereas the spirituals are homophonic, rural blues and early jazz "was largely based on concepts of heterophony".

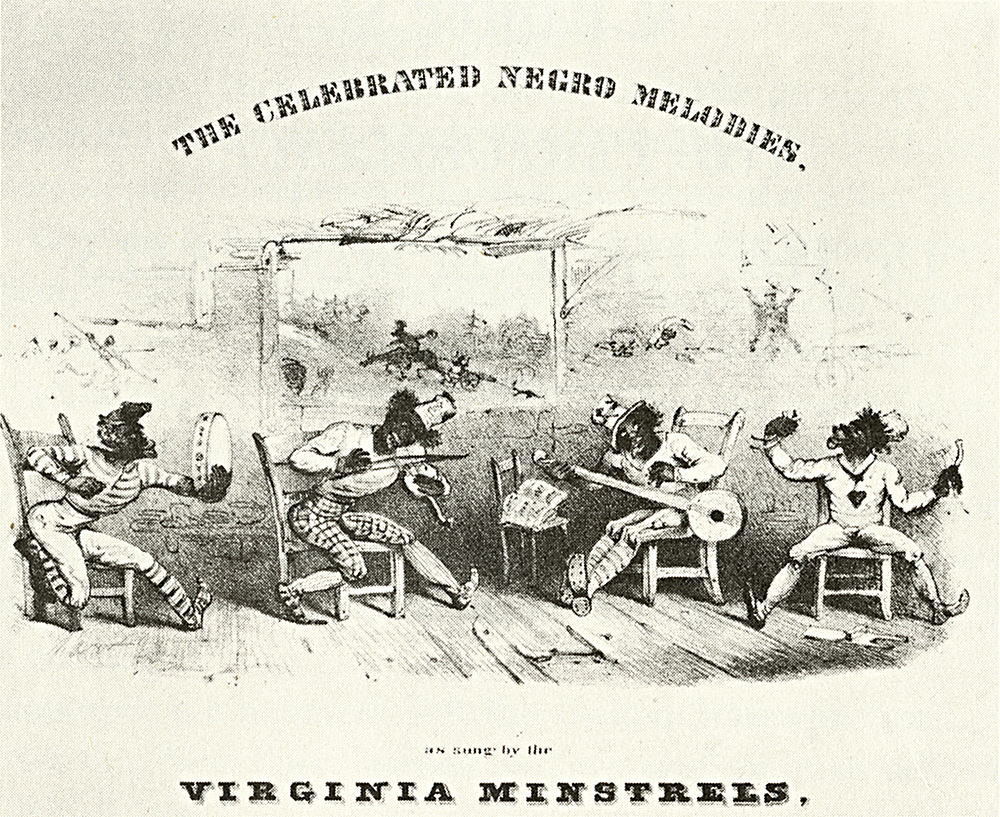
The blackface Virginia Minstrels in 1843, featuring tambourine, fiddle, banjo, and bones

During the early 19th century an increasing number of black musicians learned to play European instruments, particularly the violin, which they used to parody European dance music in their own cakewalk dances. In turn, European American minstrel show performers in blackface popularized the music internationally, combining syncopation with European harmonic accompaniment. In the mid-1800s the white New Orleans composer Louis Moreau Gottschalk adapted slave rhythms and melodies from Cuba and other Caribbean islands into piano salon music. New Orleans was the main nexus between the Afro-Caribbean and African American cultures.

=== African rhythmic retention ===
The Black Codes outlawed drumming by enslaved people, which meant that African drumming traditions were not preserved in North America, unlike in Cuba, Haiti, and elsewhere in the Caribbean. African-based rhythmic patterns were retained in the United States in large part through "body rhythms" such as stomping, clapping, and patting juba dancing.

In the opinion of jazz historian Ernest Borneman, what preceded New Orleans jazz before 1890 was "Afro-Latin music", similar to what was played in the Caribbean at the time. A three-stroke pattern known in Cuban music as tresillo is a fundamental rhythmic figure heard in many different slave musics of the Caribbean, as well as the Afro-Caribbean folk dances performed in New Orleans Congo Square and Gottschalk's compositions (for example "Souvenirs From Havana" (1859)). Tresillo (shown below) is the most basic and most prevalent duple-pulse rhythmic cell in sub-Saharan African music traditions and the music of the African Diaspora.

Tresillo is heard prominently in New Orleans second line music and in other forms of popular music from that city from the turn of the 20th century to present. "By and large the simpler African rhythmic patterns survived in jazz ... because they could be adapted more readily to European rhythmic conceptions," jazz historian Gunther Schuller observed. "Some survived, others were discarded as the Europeanization progressed."

In the post-Civil War period (after 1865), African Americans were able to obtain surplus military bass drums, snare drums and fifes, and an original African-American drum and fife music emerged, featuring tresillo and related syncopated rhythmic figures. This was a drumming tradition that was distinct from its Caribbean counterparts, expressing a uniquely African-American sensibility. "The snare and bass drummers played syncopated cross-rhythms," observed the writer Robert Palmer, speculating that "this tradition must have dated back to the latter half of the nineteenth century, and it could have not have developed in the first place if there hadn't been a reservoir of polyrhythmic sophistication in the culture it nurtured."

=== Latin American influence ===
African-American music began incorporating Spanish and Latin American rhythmic motifs in the 19th century when the contradanza (also called contradanza criolla, danza, danza criolla, or habanera) the Spanish and Spanish-American version of the contradanse, gained international popularity. John Storm Roberts states that the musical genre habanera "reached the U.S. twenty years before the first rag was published." For the more than quarter-century in which the cakewalk, ragtime, and proto-jazz were forming and developing, the habanera was a consistent part of African-American popular music.

Contradanzas were widely available as sheet music and were the first written music which was rhythmically based on an African motif (1803). From the perspective of African-American music, the "Contradanza rhythm" (also known as "congo"), "tango-congo", or tango. can be thought of as a combination of tresillo and the backbeat.

New Orleans native Louis Moreau Gottschalk's piano piece "Ojos Criollos (Danse Cubaine)" (1860) was influenced by the composer's studies in Cuba: the Contradanza rhythm is clearly heard in the left hand. In Gottschalk's symphonic work "A Night in the Tropics" (1859), the tresillo variant cinquillo appears extensively. The figure was later used by Scott Joplin and other ragtime composers.

Comparing the music of New Orleans with the music of Cuba, Wynton Marsalis observes that tresillo is the New Orleans "clavé", a Spanish word meaning "code" or "key", as in the key to a puzzle, or mystery. Although the pattern is only half a clave, Marsalis makes the point that the single-celled figure is the guide-pattern of New Orleans music. Jelly Roll Morton called the rhythmic figure the Spanish tinge and considered it an essential ingredient of jazz.

=== Ragtime ===
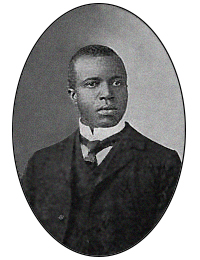
Scott Joplin in 1903

The abolition of slavery in 1865 led to new opportunities for the education of freed African Americans. Although strict segregation limited employment opportunities for most blacks, many were able to find work in entertainment. Black musicians were able to provide entertainment in dances, minstrel shows, and in vaudeville, during which time many marching bands were formed. Black pianists played in bars, clubs, and brothels, as ragtime developed.

Ragtime appeared as sheet music, popularized by African-American musicians such as the entertainer Ernest Hogan, whose hit songs appeared in 1895. Two years later, Vess Ossman recorded a medley of these songs as a banjo solo known as "Rag Time Medley". Also in 1897, the white composer William Krell published his "Mississippi Rag" as the first written piano instrumental ragtime piece, and Tom Turpin published his "Harlem Rag", the first rag published by an African-American.

Classically trained pianist Scott Joplin produced his "Original Rags" in 1898 and, in 1899, had an international hit with "Maple Leaf Rag", a multi-strain ragtime march with four parts that feature recurring themes and a bass line with copious seventh chords. Its structure was the basis for many other rags, and the syncopations in the right hand, especially in the transition between the first and second strain, were novel at the time. The last four measures of Scott Joplin's "Maple Leaf Rag" (1899) are shown below.

African-based rhythmic patterns such as tresillo and its variants, the Contradanza rhythm and cinquillo, are heard in the ragtime compositions of Joplin and Turpin. Joplin's "Solace" (1909) is generally considered to be in the Contradanza genre: both of the pianist's hands play in a syncopated fashion, completely abandoning any sense of a march rhythm. Ned Sublette postulates that the tresillo rhythm "found its way into ragtime and the cakewalk," whilst Roberts suggests that "the habanera influence may have been part of what freed black music from ragtime's European bass".

=== Ragtime in other regions ===
In the northeastern United States, a "hot" style of playing ragtime had developed, notably James Reese Europe's symphonic Clef Club orchestra in New York City, which played a benefit concert at Carnegie Hall in 1912. The Baltimore rag style of Eubie Blake influenced James P. Johnson's development of stride piano playing, in which the right hand plays the melody, while the left hand provides the rhythm and bassline.

In Ohio and elsewhere in the mid-west the major influence was ragtime, until about 1919. Around 1912, when the four-string banjo and saxophone came in, musicians began to improvise the melody line, but the harmony and rhythm remained unchanged. A contemporary account states that blues could only be heard in jazz in the gut-bucket cabarets, which were generally looked down upon by the Black middle-class.

=== Blues ===
==== African genesis ====
A hexatonic blues scale on C, ascending

Blues is the name given to both a musical form and a music genre, which originated in African-American communities of primarily the Deep South of the United States at the end of the 19th century from their spirituals, work songs, field hollers, shouts and chants and rhymed simple narrative ballads.

The African use of pentatonic scales contributed to the development of blue notes in blues and jazz. As Kubik explains:

Many of the rural blues of the Deep South are stylistically an extension and merger of basically two broad accompanied song-style traditions in the west central Sudanic belt:

- A strongly Arabic/Islamic song style, as found for example among the Hausa. It is characterized by melisma, wavy intonation, pitch instabilities within a pentatonic framework, and a declamatory voice.
- An ancient west central Sudanic stratum of pentatonic song composition, often associated with simple work rhythms in a regular meter, but with notable off-beat accents.

==== W. C. Handy: early published blues ====
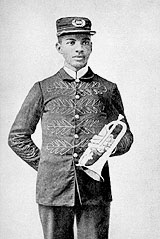
W. C. Handy at 19, 1892

W. C. Handy became interested in folk blues of the Deep South while traveling through the Mississippi Delta. In this folk blues form, the singer would improvise freely within a limited melodic range, sounding like a field holler, and the guitar accompaniment was slapped rather than strummed, like a small drum which responded in syncopated accents, functioning as another "voice". Handy and his band members were formally trained African-American musicians who had not grown up with the blues, yet he was able to adapt the blues to a larger band instrument format and arrange them in a popular music form.

Handy wrote about his adopting of the blues:

The primitive southern Negro, as he sang, was sure to bear down on the third and seventh tone of the scale, slurring between major and minor. Whether in the cotton field of the Delta or on the Levee up St. Louis way, it was always the same. Till then, however, I had never heard this slur used by a more sophisticated Negro, or by any white man. I tried to convey this effect ... by introducing flat thirds and sevenths (now called blue notes) into my song, although its prevailing key was major ... , and I carried this device into my melody as well.

The publication of his "Memphis Blues" sheet music in 1912 introduced the 12-bar blues to the world (although Gunther Schuller argues that it is not really a blues, but "more like a cakewalk"). This composition, as well as his later "St. Louis Blues" and others, included the habanera rhythm, and would become jazz standards. Handy's music career began in the pre-jazz era and contributed to the codification of jazz through the publication of some of the first jazz sheet music.

=== New Orleans origins ===
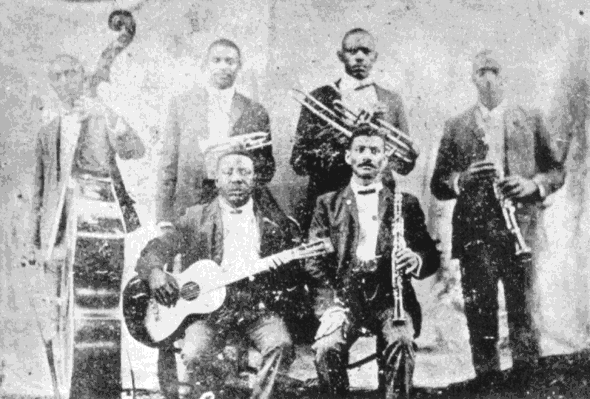
The Bolden Band around 1905

The music of New Orleans, Louisiana, had a profound effect on the creation of early jazz. In New Orleans, enslaved people could practice elements of their culture such as voodoo and playing drums. Many early jazz musicians played in the bars and brothels of the red-light district around Basin Street called Storyville. In addition to dance bands, there were marching bands which played at lavish funerals (later called jazz funerals). The instruments used by marching bands and dance bands became the instruments of jazz: brass, drums, and reeds tuned in the European 12-tone scale. Small bands contained a combination of self-taught and formally educated musicians, many from the funeral procession tradition. These bands traveled in black communities in the deep south. Beginning in 1914, Louisiana Creole and African-American musicians played in vaudeville shows which carried jazz to cities in the northern and western parts of the U.S. Jazz became international in 1914, when the Creole Band with cornettist Freddie Keppard performed the first ever jazz concert outside the United States, at the Pantages Playhouse Theatre in Winnipeg, Canada.

In New Orleans, a white bandleader named Papa Jack Laine integrated blacks and whites in his marching band. He was known as "the father of white jazz" because of the many top players he employed, such as George Brunies, Sharkey Bonano, and future members of the Original Dixieland Jass Band. During the early 1900s, jazz was mostly performed in African-American and mulatto communities due to segregation laws. Storyville brought jazz to a wider audience through tourists who visited the port city of New Orleans. Many jazz musicians from African-American communities were hired to perform in bars and brothels. These included Buddy Bolden and Jelly Roll Morton in addition to those from other communities, such as Lorenzo Tio and Alcide Nunez. Louis Armstrong started his career in Storyville and found success in Chicago. Storyville was shut down by the U.S. government in 1917.

==== Syncopation ====
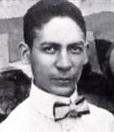
Jelly Roll Morton, a Louisiana Creole jazz artist, c. 1917 or 1918

Cornetist Buddy Bolden played in New Orleans from 1895 to 1906. No recordings by him exist. His band is credited with creating the big four: the first syncopated bass drum pattern to deviate from the standard on-the-beat march. As the example below shows, the second half of the big four pattern is the habanera rhythm.

Afro-Creole pianist Jelly Roll Morton began his career in Storyville. Beginning in 1904, he toured with vaudeville shows to southern cities, Chicago, and New York City. In 1905, he composed "Jelly Roll Blues", which became the first jazz arrangement in print when it was published in 1915. It introduced more musicians to the New Orleans style.

Morton considered the tresillo/habanera, which he called the Spanish tinge, an essential ingredient of jazz. "Now in one of my earliest tunes, 'New Orleans Blues,' you can notice the Spanish tinge. In fact, if you can't manage to put tinges of Spanish in your tunes, you will never be able to get the right seasoning, I call it, for jazz."

An excerpt of "New Orleans Blues" is shown below. In the excerpt, the left hand plays the tresillo rhythm, while the right hand plays variations on cinquillo.

Morton was a crucial innovator in the evolution from the early jazz form known as ragtime to jazz piano, and could perform pieces in either style; in 1938, Morton made a series of recordings for the Library of Congress in which he demonstrated the difference between the two styles. Morton's solos, however, were still close to ragtime, and were not merely improvisations over chord changes as in later jazz, but his use of the blues was of equal importance.

==== Swing in the early 20th century ====
Morton loosened ragtime's rigid rhythmic feeling, decreasing its embellishments and employing a swing feeling. Swing is the most important and enduring African-based rhythmic technique used in jazz. An oft quoted definition of swing by Louis Armstrong is: "if you don't feel it, you'll never know it." The New Harvard Dictionary of Music states that swing is: "An intangible rhythmic momentum in jazz...Swing defies analysis; claims to its presence may inspire arguments." The dictionary does nonetheless provide the useful description of triple subdivisions of the beat contrasted with duple subdivisions: swing superimposes six subdivisions of the beat over a basic pulse structure or four subdivisions. This aspect of swing is far more prevalent in African-American music than in Afro-Caribbean music. One aspect of swing, which is heard in more rhythmically complex Diaspora musics, places strokes in-between the triple and duple-pulse "grids".

New Orleans brass bands are a lasting influence, contributing horn players to the world of professional jazz with the distinct sound of the city whilst helping black children escape poverty. The leader of New Orleans's Camelia Brass Band, D'Jalma Ganier, taught Louis Armstrong to play trumpet; Armstrong would then popularize the New Orleans style of trumpet playing, and then expand it. Like Jelly Roll Morton, Armstrong is also credited with the abandonment of ragtime's stiffness in favor of swung notes. Armstrong, perhaps more than any other musician, codified the rhythmic technique of swing in jazz and broadened the jazz solo vocabulary.

The Original Dixieland Jass Band made the music's first recordings early in 1917, and their "Livery Stable Blues" became the earliest released jazz record. That year, numerous other bands made recordings featuring "jazz" in the title or band name, but most were ragtime or novelty records rather than jazz. In February 1918 during World War I, James Reese Europe's "Hellfighters" infantry band took ragtime to Europe, then on their return recorded Dixieland standards including "Darktown Strutters' Ball".

== The Jazz Age ==
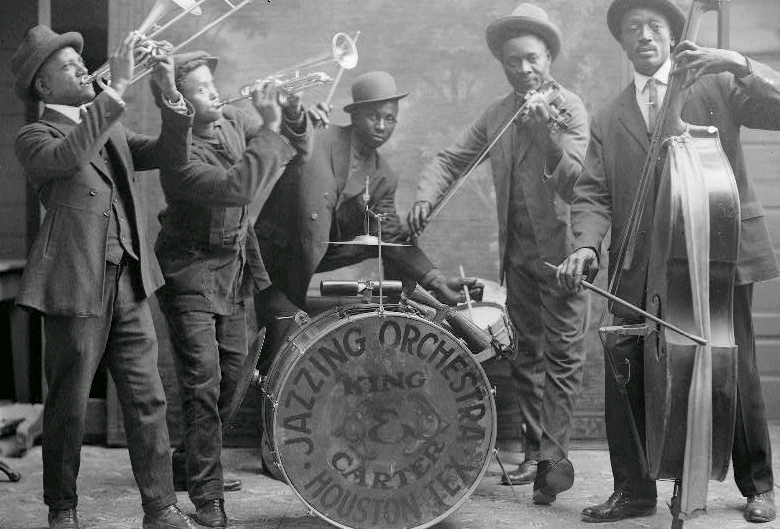
The King & Carter Jazzing Orchestra photographed in Houston, Texas, January 1921

From 1920 to 1933, Prohibition in the United States banned the sale of alcoholic drinks, resulting in illicit speakeasies which became lively venues of the "Jazz Age", hosting popular music, dance songs, novelty songs, and show tunes. Jazz began to get a reputation as immoral, and many members of the older generations saw it as a threat to the old cultural values by promoting the decadent values of the Roaring '20s. Henry van Dyke of Princeton University wrote, "... it is not music at all. It's merely an irritation of the nerves of hearing, a sensual teasing of the strings of physical passion." The New York Times reported that Siberian villagers used jazz to scare away bears, but the villagers had used pots and pans; another story claimed that the fatal heart attack of a celebrated conductor was caused by jazz.

Jazz Me Blues
The Original Dixieland Jass Band performing "Jazz Me Blues", an example of a jazz piece from 1921

In 1919, Kid Ory's Original Creole Jazz Band of musicians from New Orleans began playing in San Francisco and Los Angeles, where in 1922 they became the first black jazz band of New Orleans origin to make recordings. During the same year, Bessie Smith made her first recordings. Chicago was developing "Hot Jazz", and King Oliver joined Bill Johnson. Bix Beiderbecke formed The Wolverines in 1924.

Despite its Southern black origins, there was a larger market for jazzy dance music played by white orchestras. In 1918, Paul Whiteman and his orchestra became a hit in San Francisco. He signed a contract with Victor and became the top bandleader of the 1920s, giving hot jazz a white component, hiring white musicians such as Bix Beiderbecke, Jimmy Dorsey, Tommy Dorsey, Frankie Trumbauer, and Joe Venuti. In 1924, Whiteman commissioned George Gershwin's Rhapsody in Blue, which was premiered by his orchestra. Jazz began to be recognized as a notable musical form. Olin Downes, reviewing the concert in The New York Times, wrote, "This composition shows extraordinary talent, as it shows a young composer with aims that go far beyond those of his ilk, struggling with a form of which he is far from being master. ... In spite of all this, he has expressed himself in a significant and, on the whole, highly original form. ... His first theme ... is no mere dance-tune ... it is an idea, or several ideas, correlated and combined in varying and contrasting rhythms that immediately intrigue the listener."

After Whiteman's band successfully toured Europe, huge hot jazz orchestras in theater pits caught on with other whites, including Fred Waring, Jean Goldkette, and Nathaniel Shilkret. According to Mario Dunkel, Whiteman's success was based on a "rhetoric of domestication" according to which he had elevated and rendered valuable (read "white") a previously inchoate (read "black") kind of music.

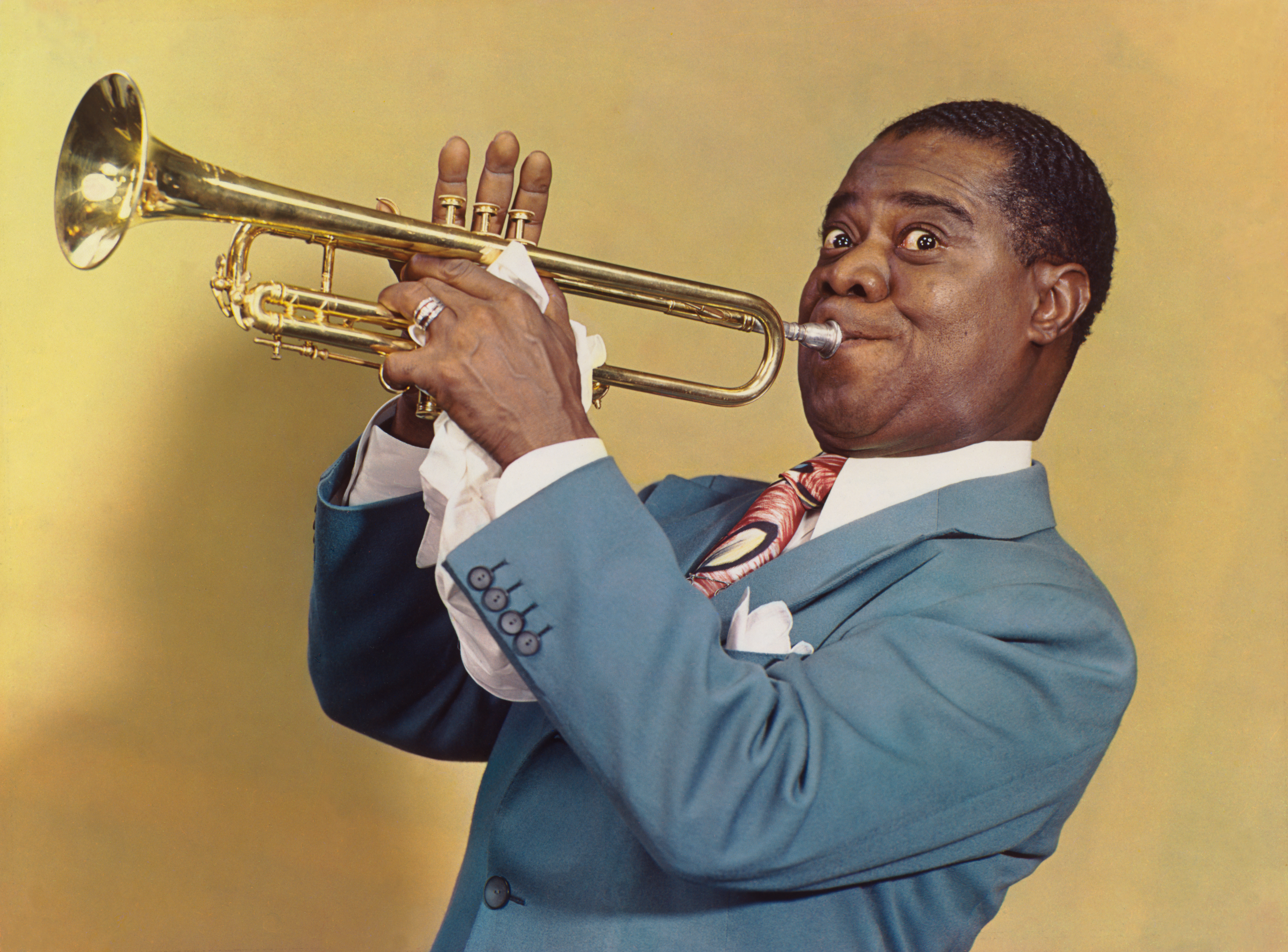
Louis Armstrong began his career in New Orleans and became one of jazz's most recognizable performers.

Whiteman's success caused black artists to follow suit, including Earl Hines (who opened in The Grand Terrace Cafe in Chicago in 1928), Washington, D.C.-native Duke Ellington (who opened at the Cotton Club in Harlem in 1927), Lionel Hampton, Fletcher Henderson, Claude Hopkins, and Don Redman, with Henderson and Redman developing the "talking to one another" formula for "hot" swing music.

In 1924, Louis Armstrong joined the Fletcher Henderson dance band for a year, as featured soloist. By 1924, one of Armstrong's favorite "sweet jazz" big bands was also formed in Canada by Guy Lombardo. His Royal Canadians Orchestra specialized in performances of "the Sweetest music this side of Heaven" which transcended racial boundaries. The original New Orleans style was polyphonic, with theme variation and simultaneous collective improvisation. Armstrong was a master of his hometown style, but by the time he joined Henderson's band, he was already a trailblazer in a new phase of jazz, with its emphasis on arrangements and soloists. Armstrong's solos went well beyond the theme-improvisation concept and extemporized on chords, rather than melodies. According to Schuller, by comparison, the solos by Armstrong's bandmates (including a young Coleman Hawkins), sounded "stiff, stodgy", with "jerky rhythms and a grey undistinguished tone quality". The following example shows a short excerpt of the straight melody of "Mandy, Make Up Your Mind" by George W. Meyer and Arthur Johnston (top), compared with Armstrong's solo improvisations (below) (recorded 1924). Armstrong's solos were a significant factor in making jazz a true 20th-century language. After leaving Henderson's group, Armstrong formed his Hot Five band, where he popularized scat singing.

=== Swing in the 1920s and 1930s ===
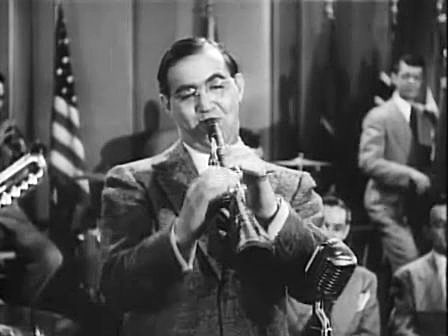
Benny Goodman (1943)

The 1930s belonged to popular swing big bands, in which some virtuoso soloists became as famous as the band leaders. Key figures in developing the "big" jazz band included bandleaders and arrangers Count Basie, Cab Calloway, Jimmy and Tommy Dorsey, Duke Ellington, Benny Goodman, Fletcher Henderson, Earl Hines, Harry James, Jimmie Lunceford, Glenn Miller and Artie Shaw. Although it was a collective sound, swing also offered individual musicians a chance to "solo" and improvise melodic, thematic solos which could at times be complex "important" music.

Over time, social strictures regarding racial segregation began to relax in America: white bandleaders began to recruit black musicians and black bandleaders white ones. In the mid-1930s, Benny Goodman hired pianist Teddy Wilson, vibraphonist Lionel Hampton and guitarist Charlie Christian to join small groups. In the 1930s, Kansas City Jazz as exemplified by tenor saxophonist Lester Young marked the transition from big bands to the bebop influence of the 1940s. An early 1940s style known as "jumping the blues" or jump blues used small combos, uptempo music and blues chord progressions, drawing on boogie-woogie from the 1930s.

=== The influence of Duke Ellington ===
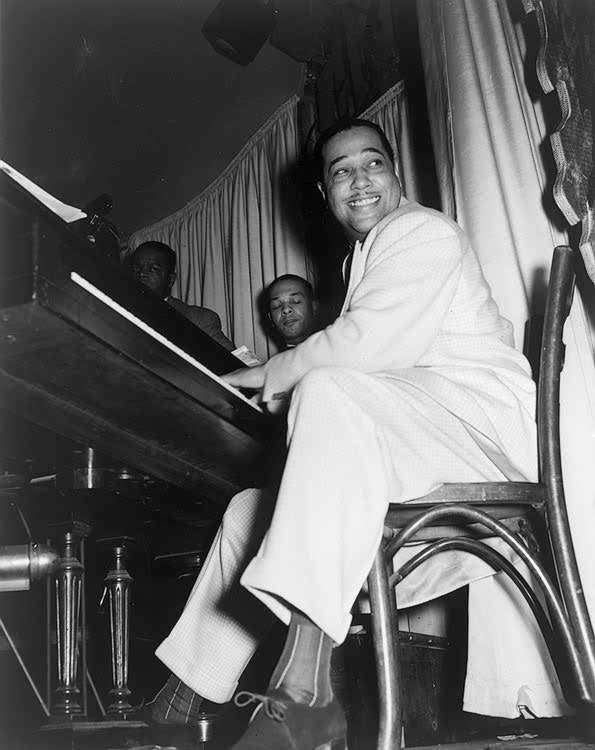
Duke Ellington at the Hurricane Club (1943)

While swing was reaching the height of its popularity, Duke Ellington spent the late 1920s and 1930s in Washington, D.C.'s jazz scene, developing an innovative musical idiom for his orchestra. Abandoning the conventions of swing, he experimented with orchestral sounds, harmony, and musical form with complex compositions that still translated well for popular audiences; some of his tunes became hits, and his own popularity spanned from the United States to Europe.

Ellington called his music American Music, rather than jazz, and liked to describe those who impressed him as "beyond category". These included many musicians from his orchestra, some of whom are considered among the best in jazz in their own right, but it was Ellington who melded them into one of the most popular jazz orchestras in the history of jazz. He often composed for the style and skills of these individuals, such as "Jeep's Blues" for Johnny Hodges, "Concerto for Cootie" for Cootie Williams (which later became "Do Nothing Till You Hear from Me" with Bob Russell's lyrics), and "The Mooche" for Tricky Sam Nanton and Bubber Miley. He also recorded compositions written by his bandsmen, such as Juan Tizol's "Caravan" and "Perdido", which brought the "Spanish Tinge" to big-band jazz. Several members of the orchestra remained with him for several decades. The band reached a creative peak in the early 1940s, when Ellington and a small hand-picked group of his composers and arrangers wrote for an orchestra of distinctive voices who displayed tremendous creativity.

=== Beginnings of European jazz ===
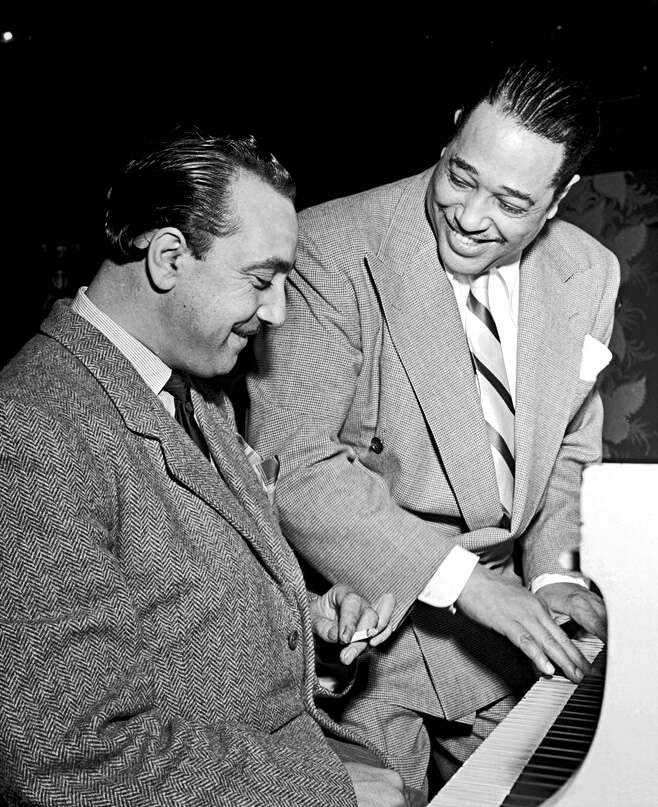
Django Reinhardt and Duke Ellington.

As only a limited number of American jazz records were released in Europe, European jazz traces many of its roots to American artists such as James Reese Europe, Paul Whiteman, and Lonnie Johnson, who visited Europe during and after World War I. It was their live performances which inspired European audiences' interest in jazz, as well as the interest in all things American (and therefore exotic) which accompanied the economic and political woes of Europe during this time. The beginnings of a distinct European style of jazz began to emerge in this interwar period.

British jazz began with a tour by the Original Dixieland Jazz Band in 1919. In 1926, Fred Elizalde and His Cambridge Undergraduates began broadcasting on the BBC. Thereafter jazz became an important element in many leading dance orchestras, and jazz instrumentalists became numerous.

This style entered full swing in France with the Quintette du Hot Club de France, which began in 1934. Much of this French jazz was a combination of African-American jazz and the symphonic styles in which French musicians were well-trained; in this, it is easy to see the inspiration taken from Paul Whiteman since his style was also a fusion of the two. Belgian guitarist Django Reinhardt popularized gypsy jazz, a mix of 1930s American swing, French dance hall "musette", and Eastern European folk with a languid, seductive feel; the main instruments were steel stringed guitar, violin, and double bass. Solos pass from one player to another as guitar and bass form the rhythm section. Some researchers believe Eddie Lang and Joe Venuti pioneered the guitar-violin partnership characteristic of the genre, which was brought to France after they had been heard live or on Okeh Records in the late 1920s.

== Post-war jazz ==
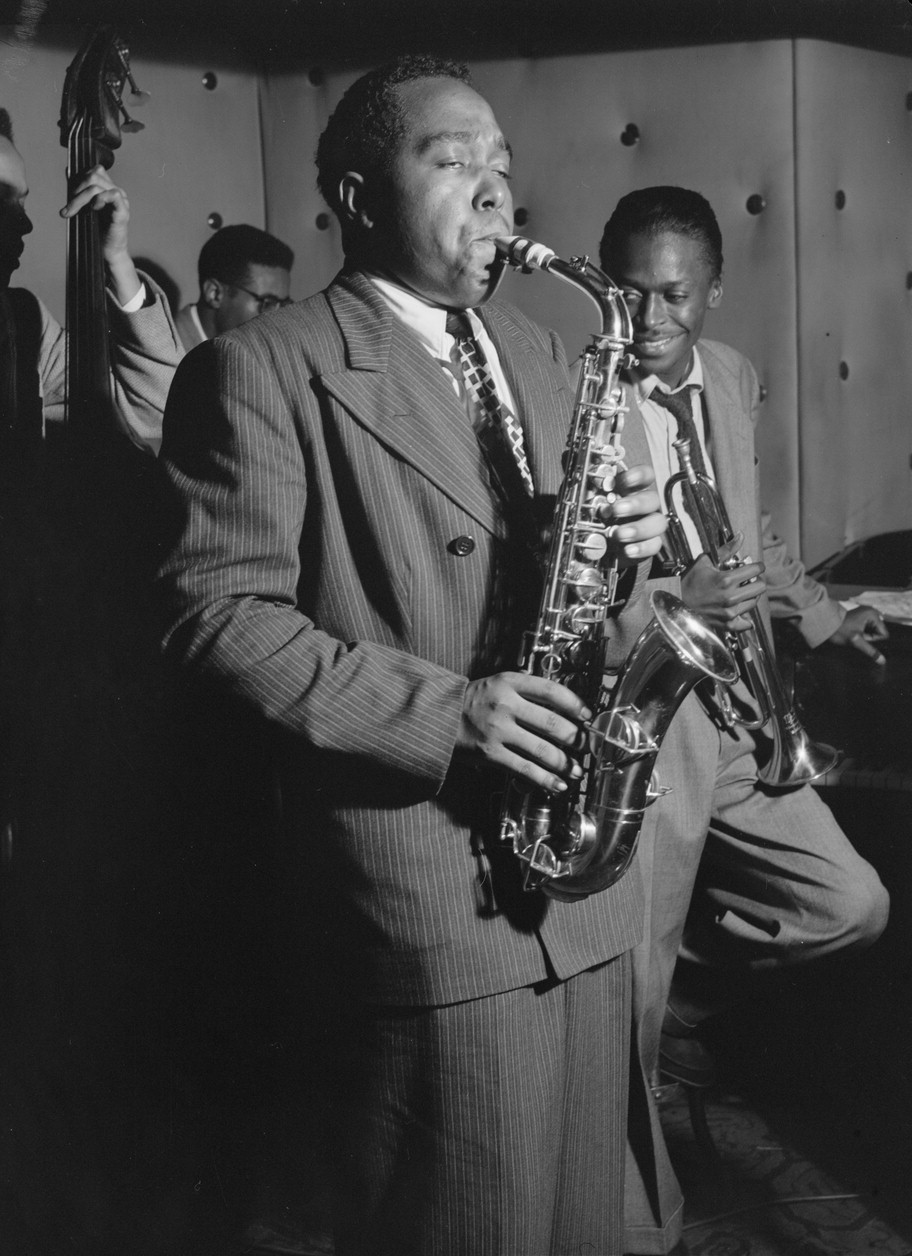
The "classic quintet": Charlie Parker, Tommy Potter, Miles Davis, Dizzy Gillespie, and Max Roach performing at Three Deuces in New York City. Photograph by William P. Gottlieb (August 1947), Library of Congress.

The outbreak of World War II marked a turning point for jazz. The swing-era jazz of the previous decade had challenged other popular music as being representative of the nation's culture, with big bands reaching the height of the style's success by the early 1940s; swing acts and big bands traveled with U.S. military overseas to Europe, where it also became popular. Stateside, however, the war presented difficulties for the big-band format: conscription shortened the number of musicians available; the military's need for shellac (commonly used for pressing gramophone records) limited record production; a shortage of rubber (also due to the war effort) discouraged bands from touring via road travel; and a demand by the musicians' union for a commercial recording ban limited music distribution between 1942 and 1944.

Many of the big bands who were deprived of experienced musicians because of the war effort began to enlist young players who were below the age for conscription, as was the case with saxophonist Stan Getz's entry in a band as a teenager. This coincided with a nationwide resurgence in the Dixieland style of pre-swing jazz; performers such as clarinetist George Lewis, cornetist Bill Davison, and trombonist Turk Murphy were hailed by conservative jazz critics as more authentic than the big bands. Elsewhere, with the limitations on recording, small groups of young musicians developed a more uptempo, improvisational style of jazz, collaborating and experimenting with new ideas for melodic development, rhythmic language, and harmonic substitution, during informal, late-night jam sessions hosted in small clubs and apartments. Key figures in this development were largely based in New York and included pianists Thelonious Monk and Bud Powell, drummers Max Roach and Kenny Clarke, saxophonist Charlie Parker, and trumpeter Dizzy Gillespie. This musical development became known as bebop.

Bebop and subsequent post-war jazz developments featured a wider set of notes, played in more complex patterns and at faster tempos than previous jazz. According to Clive James, bebop was "the post-war musical development which tried to ensure that jazz would no longer be the spontaneous sound of joy ... Students of race relations in America are generally agreed that the exponents of post-war jazz were determined, with good reason, to present themselves as challenging artists rather than tame entertainers." The end of the war marked "a revival of the spirit of experimentation and musical pluralism under which it had been conceived", along with "the beginning of a decline in the popularity of jazz music in America", according to American academic Michael H. Burchett.

With the rise of bebop and the end of the swing era after the war, jazz lost its cachet as pop music. Vocalists of the famous big bands moved on to being marketed and performing as solo pop singers; these included Frank Sinatra, Peggy Lee, Dick Haymes, and Doris Day. Older musicians who still performed their pre-war jazz, such as Armstrong and Ellington, were gradually viewed in the mainstream as passé. Other younger performers, such as singer Big Joe Turner and saxophonist Louis Jordan, who were discouraged by bebop's increasing complexity, pursued more lucrative endeavors in rhythm and blues, jump blues, and eventually rock and roll. Some, including Gillespie, composed intricate yet danceable pieces for bebop musicians in an effort to make them more accessible, but bebop largely remained on the fringes of American audiences' purview. "The new direction of postwar jazz drew a wealth of critical acclaim, but it steadily declined in popularity as it developed a reputation as an academic genre that was largely inaccessible to mainstream audiences", Burchett said. "The quest to make jazz more relevant to popular audiences, while retaining its artistic integrity, is a constant and prevalent theme in the history of postwar jazz." During its swing period, jazz had been an uncomplicated musical scene; according to Paul Trynka, this changed in the post-war years:

Suddenly jazz was no longer straightforward. There was bebop and its variants, there was the last gasp of swing, there were strange new brews like the progressive jazz of Stan Kenton, and there was a completely new phenomenon called revivalism – the rediscovery of jazz from the past, either on old records or performed live by aging players brought out of retirement. From now on it was no good saying that you liked jazz, you had to specify what kind of jazz. And that is the way it has been ever since, only more so. Today, the word 'jazz' is virtually meaningless without further definition.

=== Bebop ===
In the early 1940s, bebop-style performers began to shift jazz from danceable popular music toward a more challenging "musician's music". The most influential bebop musicians included saxophonist Charlie Parker, pianists Bud Powell and Thelonious Monk, trumpeters Dizzy Gillespie and Clifford Brown, and drummer Max Roach. Divorcing itself from dance music, bebop established itself more as an art form, thus lessening its potential popular and commercial appeal.

Composer Gunther Schuller wrote: "In 1943 I heard the great Earl Hines band which had Bird in it and all those other great musicians. They were playing all the flatted fifth chords and all the modern harmonies and substitutions and Dizzy Gillespie runs in the trumpet section work. Two years later I read that that was 'bop' and the beginning of modern jazz ... but the band never made recordings."

Dizzy Gillespie wrote: "People talk about the Hines band being 'the incubator of bop' and the leading exponents of that music ended up in the Hines band. But people also have the erroneous impression that the music was new. It was not. The music evolved from what went before. It was the same basic music. The difference was in how you got from here to here to here...naturally each age has got its own shit."

Since bebop was meant to be listened to, not danced to, it could use faster tempos. Drumming shifted to a more elusive and explosive style, in which the ride cymbal was used to keep time while the snare and bass drum were used for accents. This led to a highly syncopated music with a linear rhythmic complexity.

Bebop musicians employed several harmonic devices which were not previously typical in jazz, engaging in a more abstracted form of chord-based improvisation. Bebop scales are traditional scales with an added chromatic passing note; bebop also uses "passing" chords, substitute chords, and altered chords. New forms of chromaticism and dissonance were introduced into jazz, and the dissonant tritone (or "flatted fifth") interval became the "most important interval of bebop" Chord progressions for bebop tunes were often taken directly from popular swing-era tunes and reused with a new and more complex melody or reharmonized with more complex chord progressions to form new compositions, a practice which was already well-established in earlier jazz, but came to be central to the bebop style. Bebop made use of several relatively common chord progressions, such as blues (at base, I–IV–V, but often infused with ii–V motion) and "rhythm changes" (I-vi-ii-V) – the chords to the 1930s pop standard "I Got Rhythm". Late bop also moved towards extended forms that represented a departure from pop and show tunes.

The harmonic development in bebop is often traced back to a moment experienced by Charlie Parker while performing "Cherokee" at Clark Monroe's Uptown House, New York, in early 1942. "I'd been getting bored with the stereotyped changes that were being used...and I kept thinking there's bound to be something else. I could hear it sometimes. I couldn't play it...I was working over 'Cherokee,' and, as I did, I found that by using the higher intervals of a chord as a melody line and backing them with appropriately related changes, I could play the thing I'd been hearing. It came alive." Gerhard Kubik postulates that harmonic development in bebop sprang from blues and African-related tonal sensibilities rather than 20th-century Western classical music. "Auditory inclinations were the African legacy in [Parker's] life, reconfirmed by the experience of the blues tonal system, a sound world at odds with the Western diatonic chord categories. Bebop musicians eliminated Western-style functional harmony in their music while retaining the strong central tonality of the blues as a basis for drawing upon various African matrices."

Samuel Floyd states that blues was both the bedrock and propelling force of bebop, bringing about a new harmonic conception using extended chord structures that led to unprecedented harmonic and melodic variety, a developed and even more highly syncopated, linear rhythmic complexity and a melodic angularity in which the blue note of the fifth degree was established as an important melodic-harmonic device; and reestablishment of the blues as the primary organizing and functional principle. Kubik wrote:

While for an outside observer, the harmonic innovations in bebop would appear to be inspired by experiences in Western "serious" music, from Claude Debussy to Arnold Schoenberg, such a scheme cannot be sustained by the evidence from a cognitive approach. Claude Debussy did have some influence on jazz, for example, on Bix Beiderbecke's piano playing. And it is also true that Duke Ellington adopted and reinterpreted some harmonic devices in European contemporary music. West Coast jazz would run into such debts as would several forms of cool jazz, but bebop has hardly any such debts in the sense of direct borrowings. On the contrary, ideologically, bebop was a strong statement of rejection of any kind of eclecticism, propelled by a desire to activate something deeply buried in self. Bebop then revived tonal-harmonic ideas transmitted through the blues and reconstructed and expanded others in a basically non-Western harmonic approach. The ultimate significance of all this is that the experiments in jazz during the 1940s brought back to African-American music several structural principles and techniques rooted in African traditions.

These divergences from the jazz mainstream of the time met a divided, sometimes hostile response among fans and musicians, especially swing players who bristled at the new harmonic sounds. To hostile critics, bebop seemed filled with "racing, nervous phrases". But despite the friction, by the 1950s bebop had become an accepted part of the jazz vocabulary.

=== Afro-Cuban jazz (cu-bop) ===
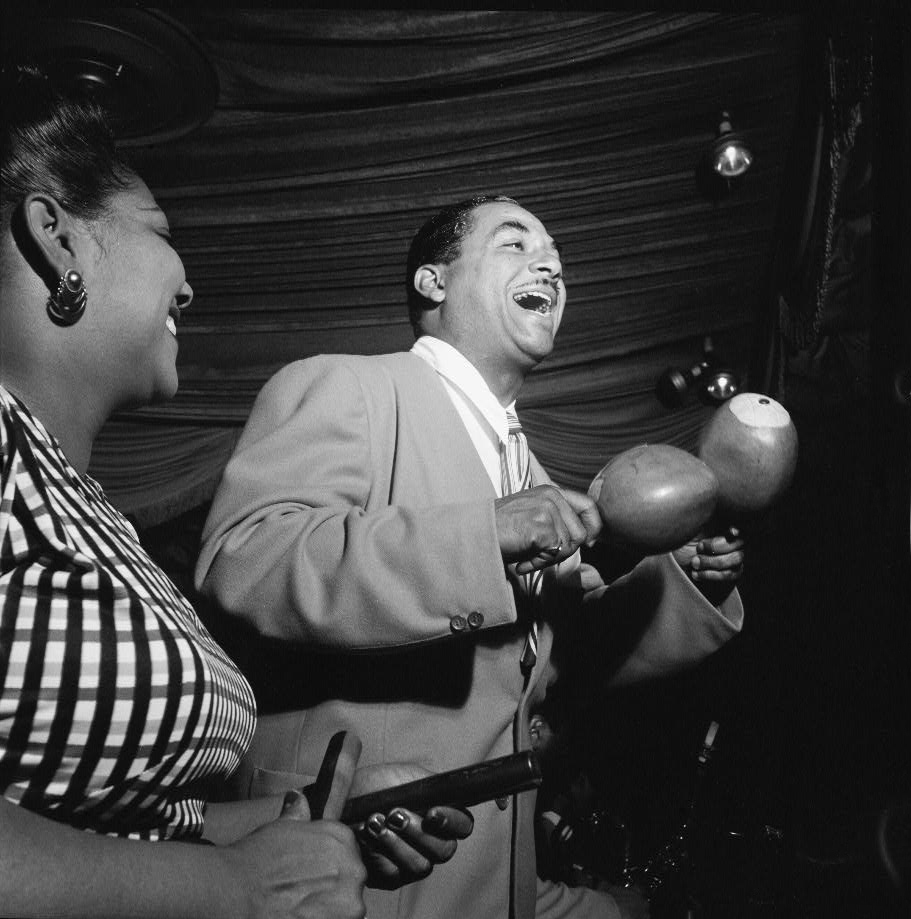
Machito (maracas) and his sister Graciella Grillo (claves)

==== Machito and Mario Bauza ====
The general consensus among musicians and musicologists is that the first original jazz piece to be overtly based in clave was "Tanga" (1943), composed by Cuban-born Mario Bauza and recorded by Machito and his Afro-Cubans in New York City. "Tanga" began as a spontaneous descarga (Cuban jam session), with jazz solos superimposed on top.

This was the birth of Afro-Cuban jazz. The use of clave brought the African timeline, or key pattern, into jazz. Music organized around key patterns convey a two-celled (binary) structure, which is a complex level of African cross-rhythm. Within the context of jazz, however, harmony is the primary referent, not rhythm. The harmonic progression can begin on either side of clave, and the harmonic "one" is always understood to be "one". If the progression begins on the "three-side" of clave, it is said to be in 3–2 clave (shown below). If the progression begins on the "two-side", it is in 2–3 clave.

==== Dizzy Gillespie and Chano Pozo ====
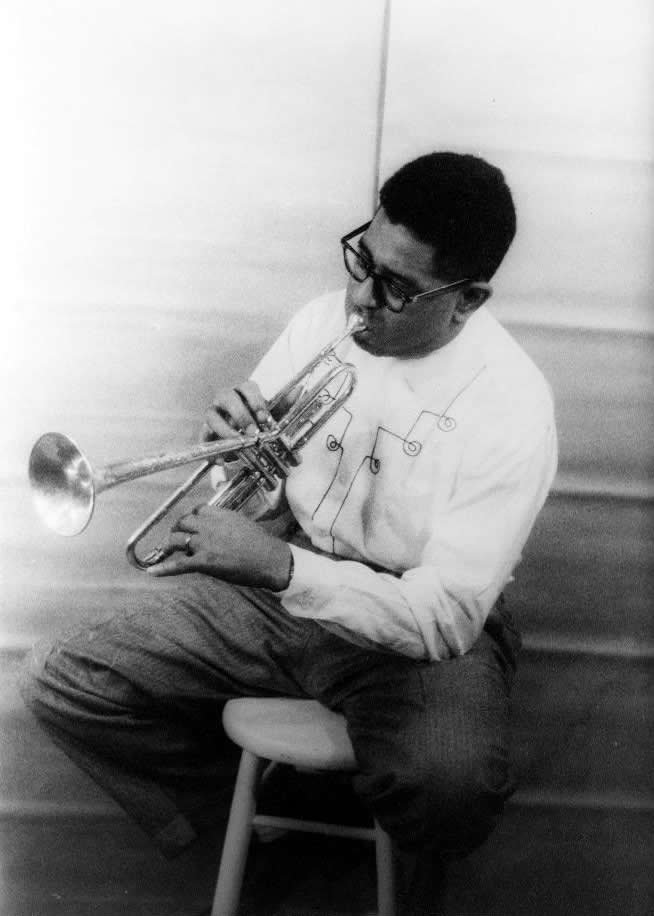
Dizzy Gillespie, 1955

Mario Bauzá introduced bebop innovator Dizzy Gillespie to Cuban conga drummer and composer Chano Pozo. Gillespie and Pozo's brief collaboration produced some of the most enduring Afro-Cuban jazz standards. "Manteca" (1947) is the first jazz standard to be rhythmically based on clave. According to Gillespie, Pozo composed the layered, contrapuntal guajeos (Afro-Cuban ostinatos) of the A section and the introduction, while Gillespie wrote the bridge. Gillespie recounted: "If I'd let it go like [Chano] wanted it, it would have been strictly Afro-Cuban all the way. There wouldn't have been a bridge. I thought I was writing an eight-bar bridge, but ... I had to keep going and ended up writing a sixteen-bar bridge." The bridge gave "Manteca" a typical jazz harmonic structure, setting the piece apart from Bauza's modal "Tanga" of a few years earlier.

Gillespie's collaboration with Pozo brought specific African-based rhythms into bebop. While pushing the boundaries of harmonic improvisation, cu-bop also drew from African rhythm. Jazz arrangements with a Latin A section and a swung B section, with all choruses swung during solos, became common practice with many Latin tunes of the jazz standard repertoire. This approach can be heard on pre-1980 recordings of "Manteca", "A Night in Tunisia", "Tin Tin Deo", and "On Green Dolphin Street".

==== "Un Poco Loco" ====
Another jazz composition critical to the development of Afro-Cuban jazz was Bud Powell's "Un Poco Loco," recorded with Curley Russell on bass and Max Roach on drums. Noted for its "frenetic energy" and "clanging cowbell and polyrhythmic accompaniment," the composition combined Afro-Cuban rhythm with polytonality and preceded further use of modality and avant-garde harmony in Latin jazz.

==== African cross-rhythm ====
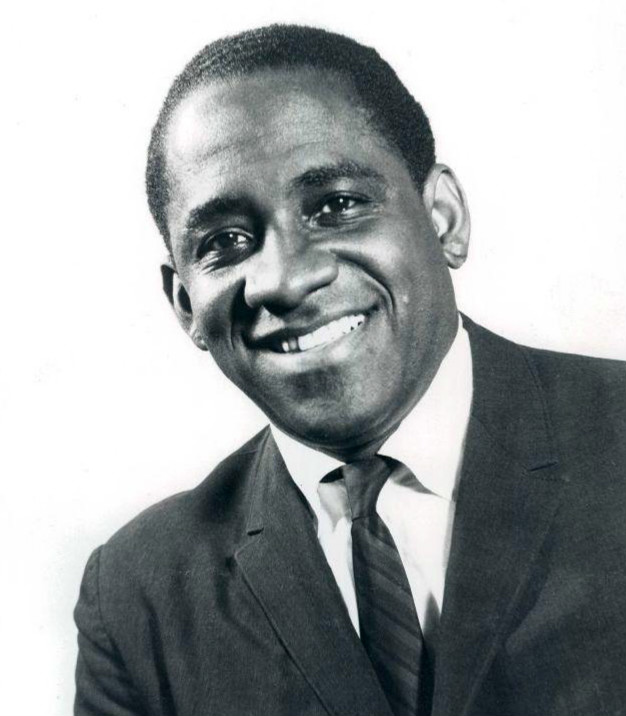
Mongo Santamaria (1969)

Cuban percussionist Mongo Santamaria first recorded his composition "Afro Blue" in 1959. "Afro Blue" was the first jazz standard built upon a typical African three-against-two (3:2) cross-rhythm, or hemiola. The piece begins with the bass repeatedly playing 6 cross-beats per each measure of 12/8, or 6 cross-beats per 4 main beats—6:4 (two cells of 3:2).

The following example shows the original ostinato "Afro Blue" bass line. The cross noteheads indicate the main beats (not bass notes).

When John Coltrane covered "Afro Blue" in 1963, he inverted the metric hierarchy, interpreting the tune as a 3/4 jazz waltz with duple cross-beats superimposed (2:3). Originally a B♭ pentatonic blues, Coltrane expanded the harmonic structure of "Afro Blue".

Perhaps the most respected Afro-cuban jazz combo of the late 1950s was vibraphonist Cal Tjader's band. Tjader had Mongo Santamaria, Armando Peraza, and Willie Bobo on his early recording dates.

=== Dixieland revival ===
In the late 1940s, there was a revival of Dixieland, harking back to the contrapuntal New Orleans style. This was driven in large part by record company reissues of jazz classics by the Oliver, Morton, and Armstrong bands of the 1930s. There were two types of musicians involved in the revival: the first group was made up of those who had begun their careers playing in the traditional style and were returning to it (or continuing what they had been playing all along), such as Bob Crosby's Bobcats, Max Kaminsky, Eddie Condon, and Wild Bill Davison. Most of these players were originally Midwesterners, although there were a small number of New Orleans musicians involved. The second group of revivalists consisted of younger musicians, such as those in the Lu Watters band, Conrad Janis, and Ward Kimball and his Firehouse Five Plus Two Jazz Band. By the late 1940s, Louis Armstrong's Allstars band became a leading ensemble. Through the 1950s and 1960s, Dixieland was one of the most commercially popular jazz styles in the US, Europe, and Japan, although critics paid little attention to it.

=== Hard bop ===
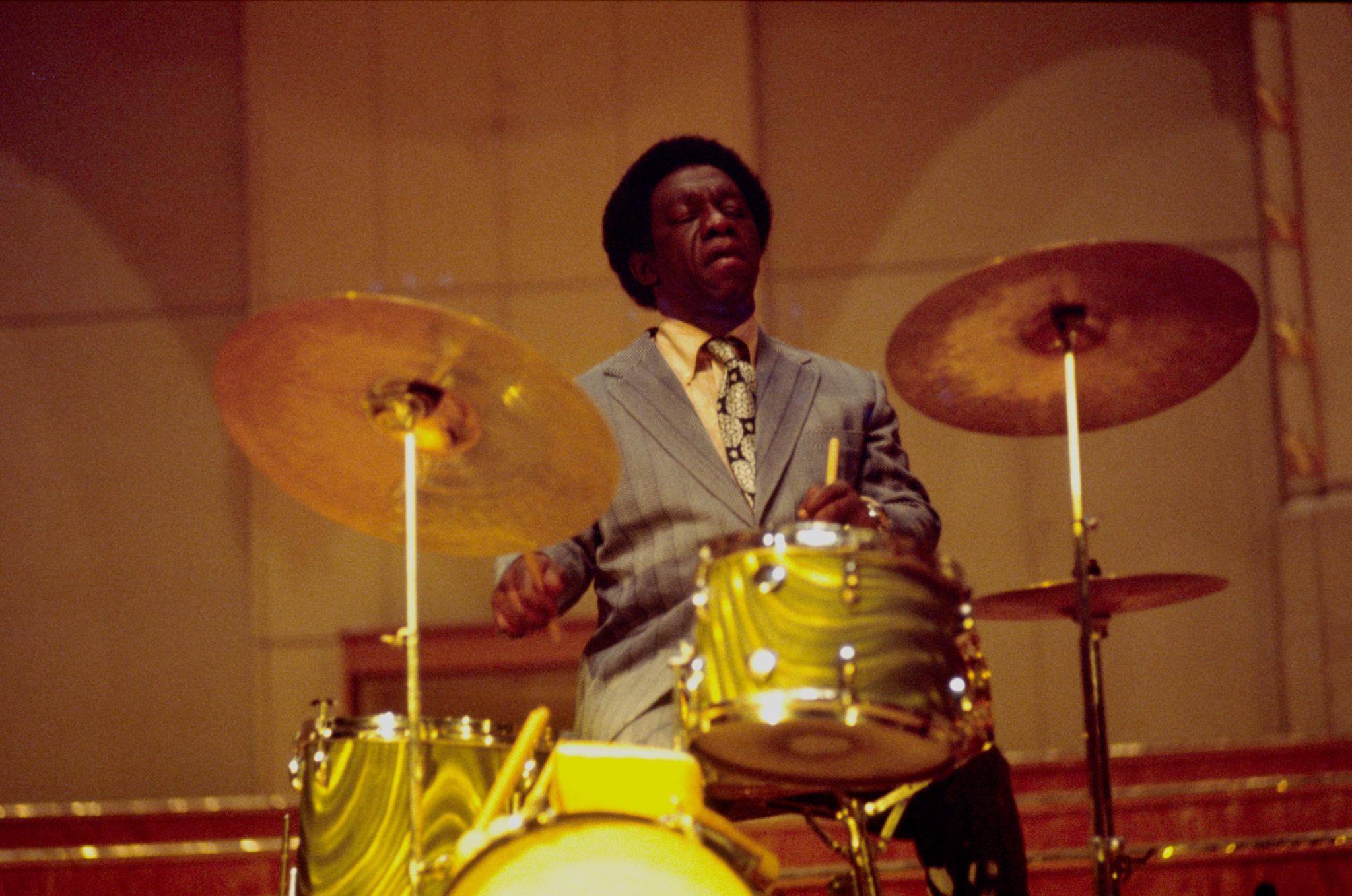
Art Blakey in 1973

Hard bop is an extension of bebop (or "bop") music that incorporates influences from blues, rhythm and blues, and gospel, especially in saxophone and piano playing. Hard bop was developed in the mid-1950s, coalescing in 1953 and 1954; it developed partly in response to the vogue for cool jazz in the early 1950s and paralleled the rise of rhythm and blues. It has been described as "funky" and can be considered a relative of soul jazz. Some elements of the genre were simplified from their bebop roots.

Miles Davis's 1954 performance of "Walkin'" at the first Newport Jazz Festival introduced the style to the jazz world. Further leaders of hard bop's development included the Clifford Brown/Max Roach Quintet, Art Blakey's Jazz Messengers, the Horace Silver Quintet, and trumpeters Lee Morgan and Freddie Hubbard. The late 1950s to early 1960s saw hard boppers form their own bands as a new generation of blues- and bebop-influenced musicians entered the jazz world, from pianists Wynton Kelly and Tommy Flanagan to saxophonists Joe Henderson and Hank Mobley. Coltrane, Johnny Griffin, Mobley, and Morgan all participated on the album A Blowin' Session (1957), considered by Al Campbell to have been one of the high points of the hard bop era.

Hard bop was prevalent within jazz for about a decade spanning from 1955 to 1965, but has remained highly influential on mainstream or "straight-ahead" jazz. It went into decline in the late 1960s through the 1970s due to the emergence of other styles such as jazz fusion, but again became influential following the Young Lions Movement and the emergence of neo-bop.

=== Modal jazz ===
Modal jazz is a development which began in the later 1950s which takes the mode, or musical scale, as the basis of musical structure and improvisation. Previously, a solo was meant to fit into a given chord progression, but with modal jazz, the soloist creates a melody using one (or a small number of) modes. The emphasis is thus shifted from harmony to melody: "Historically, this caused a seismic shift among jazz musicians, away from thinking vertically (the chord), and towards a more horizontal approach (the scale)", explained pianist Mark Levine.

The modal theory stems from a work by George Russell. Miles Davis introduced the concept to the greater jazz world with Kind of Blue (1959), an exploration of the possibilities of modal jazz which would become the best selling jazz album of all time. In contrast to Davis's earlier work with hard bop and its complex chord progression and improvisation, Kind of Blue was composed as a series of modal sketches in which the musicians were given scales that defined the parameters of their improvisation and style.

"I didn't write out the music for Kind of Blue, but brought in sketches for what everybody was supposed to play because I wanted a lot of spontaneity," recalled Davis. The track "So What" has only two chords: D-7 and E♭-7.

Other innovators in this style include Jackie McLean, and two of the musicians who had also played on Kind of Blue: John Coltrane and Bill Evans.

=== Free jazz ===
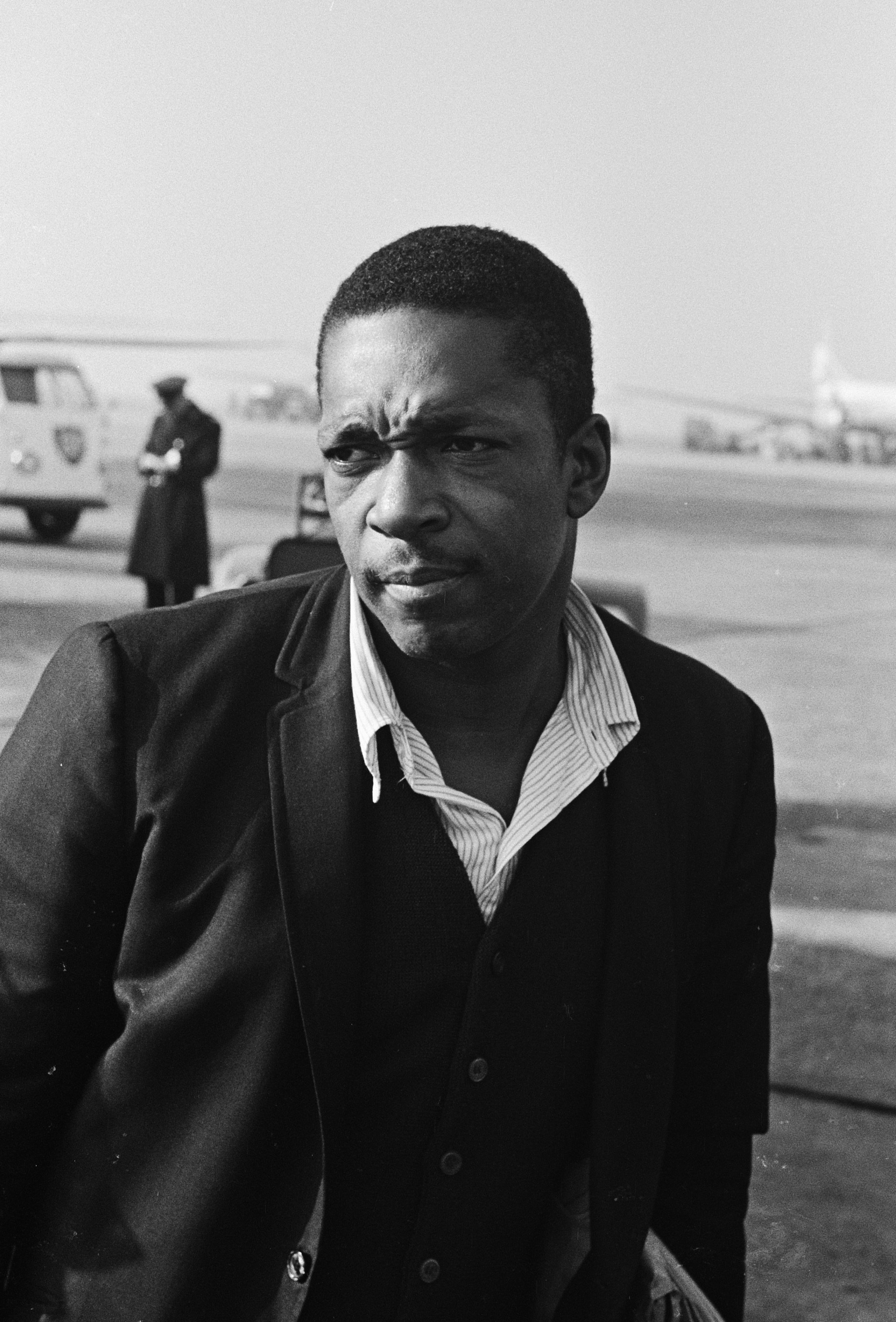
John Coltrane, 1963

Free jazz, and the related form of avant-garde jazz, broke through into an open space of "free tonality" in which meter, beat, and formal symmetry all disappeared, and a range of world music from India, Africa, and Arabia were melded into an intense, even religiously ecstatic or orgiastic style of playing. While loosely inspired by bebop, free jazz tunes gave players much more latitude; the loose harmony and tempo was deemed controversial when this approach was first developed. The bassist Charles Mingus is also frequently associated with the avant-garde in jazz, although his compositions draw from myriad styles and genres.

The first major stirrings came in the 1950s with the early work of Ornette Coleman (whose 1960 album Free Jazz: A Collective Improvisation coined the term) and Cecil Taylor. In the 1960s, exponents included Albert Ayler, Gato Barbieri, Carla Bley, Don Cherry, Larry Coryell, John Coltrane, Bill Dixon, Jimmy Giuffre, Steve Lacy, Michael Mantler, Sun Ra, Roswell Rudd, Pharoah Sanders, and John Tchicai. In developing his late style, Coltrane was especially influenced by the dissonance of Ayler's trio with bassist Gary Peacock and drummer Sunny Murray, a rhythm section honed with Cecil Taylor as leader. In November 1961, Coltrane played a gig at the Village Vanguard, which resulted in the classic Chasin' the 'Trane, which DownBeat magazine panned as "anti-jazz". On his 1961 tour of France, he was booed, but persevered, signing with the new Impulse! Records in 1960 and turning it into "the house that Trane built", while championing many younger free jazz musicians, notably Archie Shepp, who often played with trumpeter Bill Dixon, who organized the 4-day "October Revolution in Jazz" in Manhattan in 1964, the first free jazz festival.

A series of recordings with the Classic Quartet in the first half of 1965 show Coltrane's playing becoming increasingly abstract, with greater incorporation of devices like multiphonics, utilization of overtones, and playing in the altissimo register, as well as a mutated return to Coltrane's sheets of sound. In the studio, he all but abandoned his soprano to concentrate on the tenor saxophone. In addition, the quartet responded to the leader by playing with increasing freedom. The group's evolution can be traced through the recordings The John Coltrane Quartet Plays, Living Space and Transition (both June 1965), New Thing at Newport (July 1965), Sun Ship (August 1965), and First Meditations (September 1965).

In June 1965, Coltrane and 10 other musicians recorded Ascension, a 40-minute-long piece without breaks that included adventurous solos by young avant-garde musicians as well as Coltrane, and was controversial primarily for the collective improvisation sections that separated the solos. Dave Liebman later called it "the torch that lit the free jazz thing". After recording with the quartet over the next few months, Coltrane invited Pharoah Sanders to join the band in September 1965. While Coltrane used over-blowing frequently as an emotional exclamation-point, Sanders would opt to overblow his entire solo, resulting in a constant screaming and screeching in the altissimo range of the instrument.

==== Free jazz in Europe ====
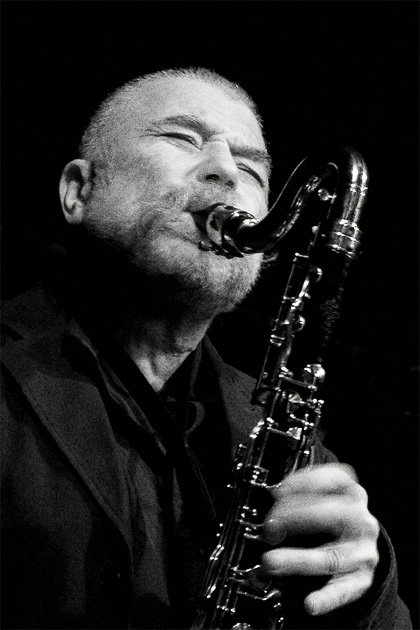
Peter Brötzmann is a key figure in European free jazz.

Free jazz was played in Europe in part because musicians such as Ayler, Taylor, Steve Lacy, and Eric Dolphy spent extended periods of time there, and European musicians such as Michael Mantler and John Tchicai traveled to the U.S. to experience American music firsthand. European contemporary jazz was shaped by Peter Brötzmann, John Surman, Krzysztof Komeda, Zbigniew Namysłowski, Tomasz Stańko, Lars Gullin, Joe Harriott, Albert Mangelsdorff, Kenny Wheeler, Graham Collier, Michael Garrick and Mike Westbrook. They were eager to develop approaches to music that reflected their heritage.

Since the 1960s, creative centers of jazz in Europe have developed, such as the creative jazz scene in Amsterdam. Following the work of drummer Han Bennink and pianist Misha Mengelberg, musicians started to explore by improvising collectively until a form (melody, rhythm, a famous song) is found Jazz critic Kevin Whitehead documented the free jazz scene in Amsterdam and some of its main exponents such as the ICP (Instant Composers Pool) orchestra in his book New Dutch Swing. Since the 1990s Keith Jarrett has defended free jazz from criticism. British writer Stuart Nicholson has argued European contemporary jazz has an identity different from American jazz and follows a different trajectory.

=== Latin jazz ===
Latin jazz is jazz that employs Latin American rhythms and is generally understood to have a more specific meaning than simply jazz from Latin America. A more precise term might be Afro-Latin jazz, as the jazz subgenre typically employs rhythms that either have a direct analog in Africa or exhibit an African rhythmic influence beyond what is ordinarily heard in other jazz. The two main categories of Latin jazz are Afro-Cuban jazz and Brazilian jazz.

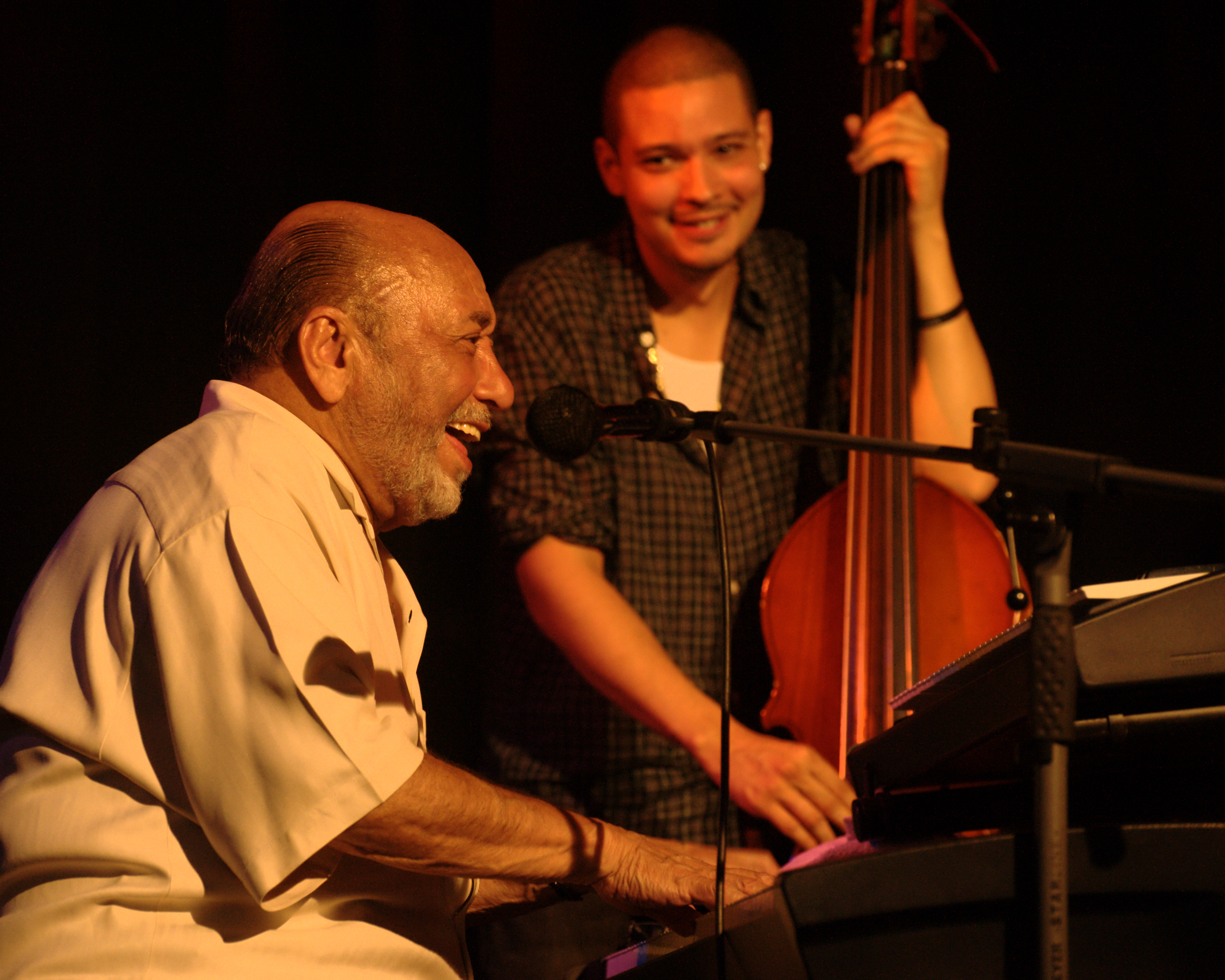
Eddie Palmieri.

In the 1960s and 1970s, many jazz musicians had only a basic understanding of Cuban and Brazilian music, and jazz compositions which used Cuban or Brazilian elements were often referred to as "Latin tunes", with no distinction between a Cuban son montuno and a Brazilian bossa nova. Even as late as 2000, in Mark Gridley's Jazz Styles: History and Analysis, a bossa nova bass line is referred to as a "Latin bass figure". It was not uncommon during the 1960s and 1970s to hear a conga playing a Cuban tumbao while the drumset and bass played a Brazilian bossa nova pattern. Some jazz standards such as "Manteca" and "On Green Dolphin Street" can be performed alternating between Latin A sections and swung B sections. Typically, the band would only play an even-eighth "Latin" feel in the A section of the head and swing throughout all of the solos. Latin jazz specialists like Cal Tjader tended to be the exception. For example, on a 1959 live Tjader recording of "A Night in Tunisia", pianist Vince Guaraldi soloed through the entire form over an authentic mambo.

==== Afro-Cuban jazz renaissance ====
For most of its history, Afro-Cuban jazz had been a matter of superimposing jazz phrasing over Cuban rhythms. But by the end of the 1970s, a new generation of New York City musicians had emerged who were fluent in both salsa dance music and jazz, leading to a new level of integration of jazz and Cuban rhythms. This era of creativity and vitality is best represented by the Gonzalez brothers Jerry (congas and trumpet) and Andy (bass). During 1974–1976, they were members of one of Eddie Palmieri's most experimental salsa groups: salsa was the medium, but Palmieri was stretching the form in new ways. He incorporated parallel fourths, with McCoy Tyner-type vamps. The innovations of Palmieri, the Gonzalez brothers and others led to an Afro-Cuban jazz renaissance in New York City.

This occurred in parallel with developments in Cuba The first Cuban band of this new wave was Irakere. Their "Chékere-son" (1976) introduced a style of "Cubanized" bebop-flavored horn lines that departed from the more angular guajeo-based lines which were typical of Cuban popular music and Latin jazz up until that time. It was based on Charlie Parker's composition "Billie's Bounce", jumbled together in a way that fused clave and bebop horn lines. In spite of the ambivalence of some band members towards Irakere's Afro-Cuban folkloric / jazz fusion, their experiments forever changed Cuban jazz: their innovations are still heard in the high level of harmonic and rhythmic complexity in Cuban jazz and in the jazzy and complex contemporary form of popular dance music known as timba.

==== Afro-Brazilian jazz ====
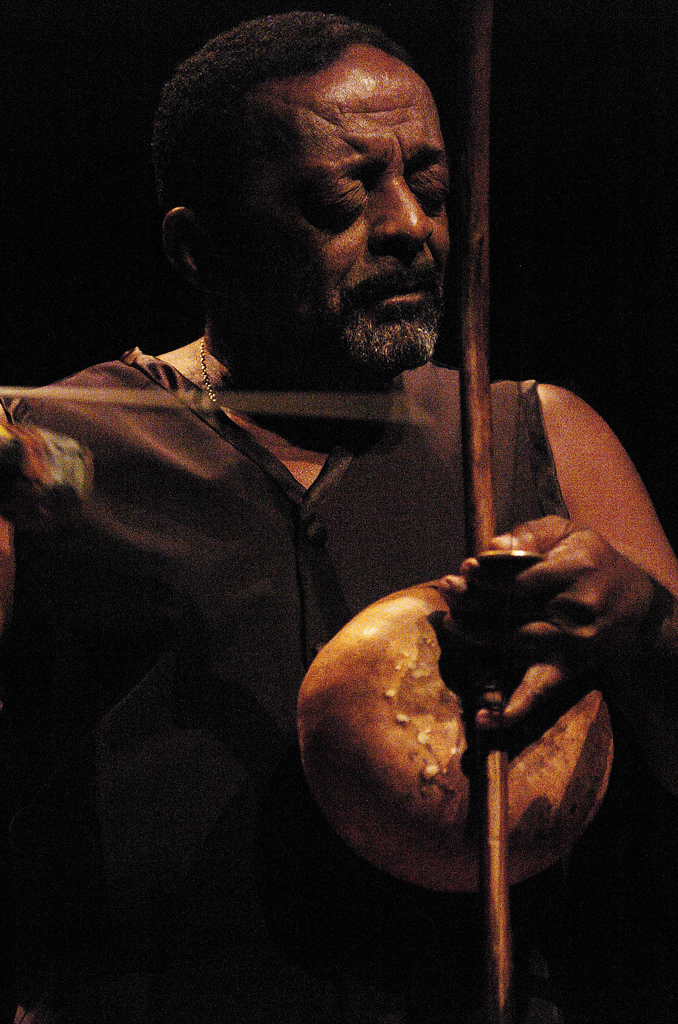
Naná Vasconcelos playing the Afro-Brazilian Berimbau

Brazilian jazz, such as bossa nova, is derived from samba, with influences from jazz and other 20th-century classical and popular music styles. Bossa is generally moderately paced, with melodies sung in Portuguese or English, whilst the related jazz-samba is an adaptation of street samba into jazz.

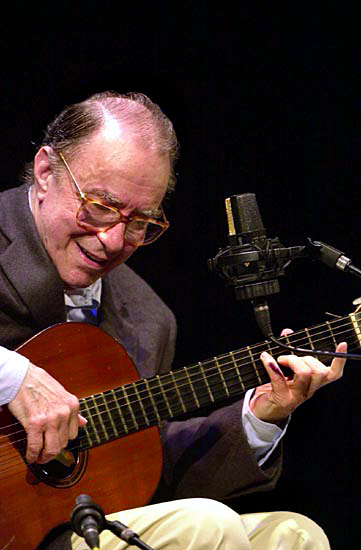
João Gilberto.

The bossa nova style was pioneered by Brazilians João Gilberto and Antônio Carlos Jobim and was made popular by Elizete Cardoso's recording of "Chega de Saudade" on the Canção do Amor Demais LP. Gilberto's initial releases, and the 1959 film Black Orpheus, achieved significant popularity in Latin America; this spread to North America via visiting American jazz musicians. The resulting recordings by Charlie Byrd and Stan Getz cemented bossa nova's popularity and led to a worldwide boom, with 1963's Getz/Gilberto, numerous recordings by famous jazz performers such as Ella Fitzgerald and Frank Sinatra, and the eventual entrenchment of the bossa nova style as a lasting influence in world music.

Brazilian percussionists such as Airto Moreira and Naná Vasconcelos also influenced jazz internationally by introducing Afro-Brazilian folkloric instruments and rhythms into a wide variety of jazz styles, thus attracting a greater audience to them.

While bossa nova has been labeled as jazz by music critics, namely those from outside of Brazil, it has been rejected by many prominent bossa nova musicians such as Jobim, who once said "Bossa nova is not Brazilian jazz."

=== African-inspired ===
==== Rhythm ====
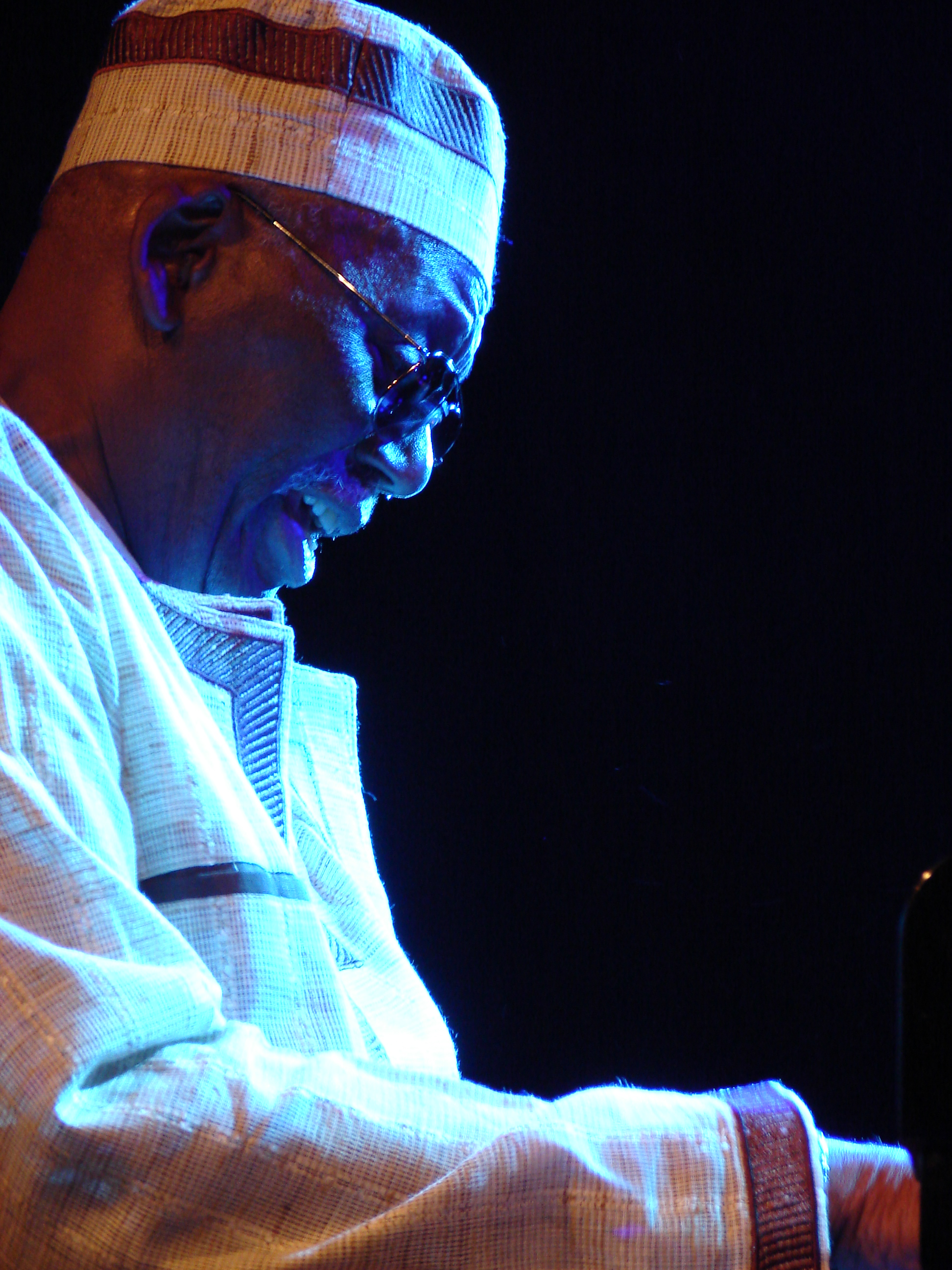
Randy Weston

The first jazz standard composed by a non-Latino to use an overt African 12/8 cross-rhythm was Wayne Shorter's "Footprints" (1967). On the version recorded on Miles Smiles by Miles Davis, the bass switches to a 4/4 tresillo figure at 2:20. "Footprints" is not, however, a Latin jazz tune: African rhythmic structures are accessed directly by Ron Carter (bass) and Tony Williams (drums) via the rhythmic sensibilities of swing. Throughout the piece, the four beats, whether sounded or not, are maintained as the temporal referent. The following example shows the 12/8 and 4/4 forms of the bass line. The slashed noteheads indicate the main beats (not bass notes), where one ordinarily taps their foot to "keep time".

==== Pentatonic scales ====
The use of pentatonic scales was another trend associated with Africa. The use of pentatonic scales in Africa probably goes back thousands of years.

McCoy Tyner perfected the use of the pentatonic scale in his solos, and also used parallel fifths and fourths, which are common harmonies in West Africa.

The minor pentatonic scale is often used in blues improvisation, and like a blues scale, a minor pentatonic scale can be played over all of the chords in a blues. The following pentatonic lick was played over blues changes by Joe Henderson on Horace Silver's "African Queen" (1965).

Jazz pianist, theorist, and educator Mark Levine refers to the scale generated by beginning on the fifth step of a pentatonic scale as the V pentatonic scale.

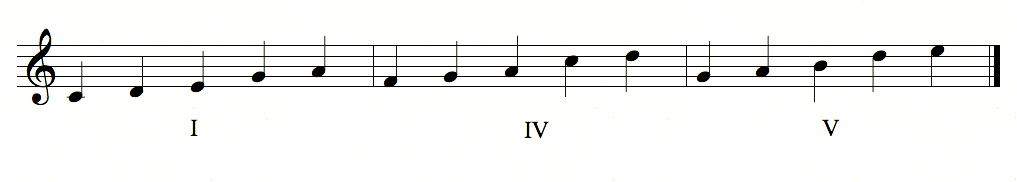
C pentatonic scale beginning on the I (C pentatonic), IV (F pentatonic), and V (G pentatonic) steps of the scale.

Levine points out that the V pentatonic scale works for all three chords of the standard II–V–I jazz progression. This is a very common progression, used in pieces such as Miles Davis's "Tune Up". The following example shows the V pentatonic scale over a II–V–I progression.

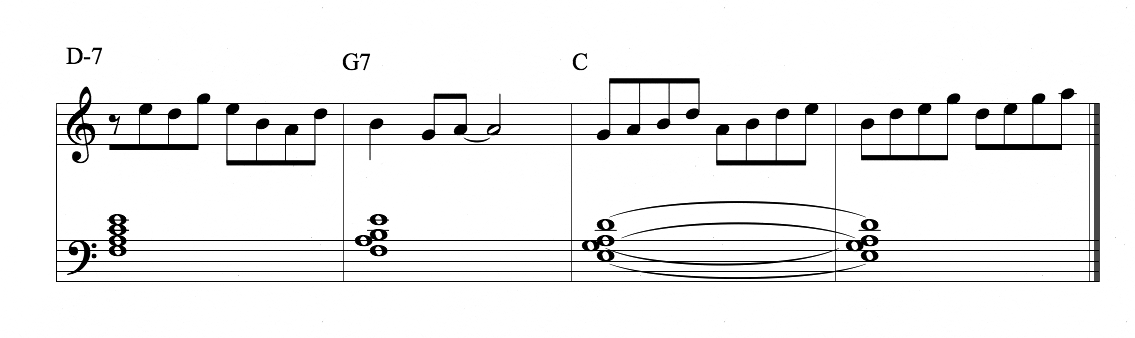
V pentatonic scale over II–V–I chord progression

Accordingly, John Coltrane's "Giant Steps" (1960), with its 26 chords per 16 bars, can be played using only three pentatonic scales. Coltrane studied Nicolas Slonimsky's Thesaurus of Scales and Melodic Patterns, which contains material that is virtually identical to portions of "Giant Steps". The harmonic complexity of "Giant Steps" is on the level of the most advanced 20th-century art music. Superimposing the pentatonic scale over "Giant Steps" is not merely a matter of harmonic simplification, but also a sort of "Africanizing" of the piece, which provides an alternate approach for soloing. Mark Levine observes that when mixed in with more conventional "playing the changes", pentatonic scales provide "structure and a feeling of increased space".

=== Sacred and liturgical jazz ===
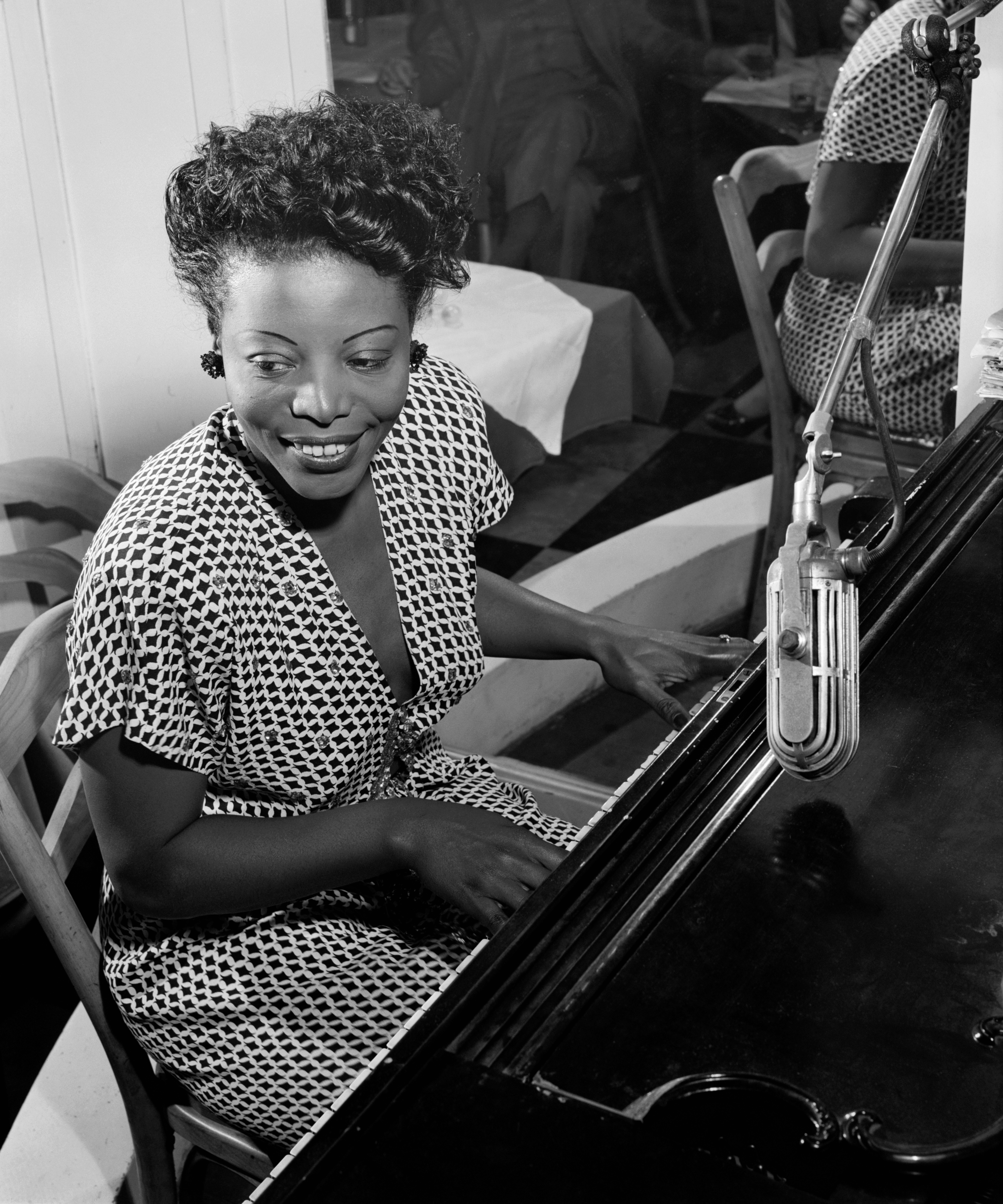
Mary Lou Williams.

As noted above, jazz has incorporated from its inception aspects of African-American sacred music including spirituals and hymns. Secular jazz musicians often performed renditions of spirituals and hymns as part of their repertoire or isolated compositions such as "Come Sunday", part of "Black and Beige Suite" by Duke Ellington. Later many other jazz artists borrowed from black gospel music. However, it was only after World War II that a few jazz musicians began to compose and perform extended works intended for religious settings or as religious expression. Since the 1950s, sacred and liturgical music has been performed and recorded by many prominent jazz composers and musicians. The "Abyssinian Mass" by Wynton Marsalis (Blueengine Records, 2016) is a recent example.

Relatively little has been written about sacred and liturgical jazz. In a 2013 doctoral dissertation, Angelo Versace examined the development of sacred jazz in the 1950s using disciplines of musicology and history. He noted that the traditions of black gospel music and jazz were combined in the 1950s to produce a new genre, "sacred jazz". Versace maintained that the religious intent separates sacred from secular jazz. Most prominent in initiating the sacred jazz movement were pianist and composer Mary Lou Williams, known for her jazz masses in the 1950s and Duke Ellington. Prior to his death in 1974 in response to contacts from Grace Cathedral in San Francisco, Duke Ellington wrote three Sacred Concerts: 1965 – A Concert of Sacred Music; 1968 – Second Sacred Concert; 1973 – Third Sacred Concert.

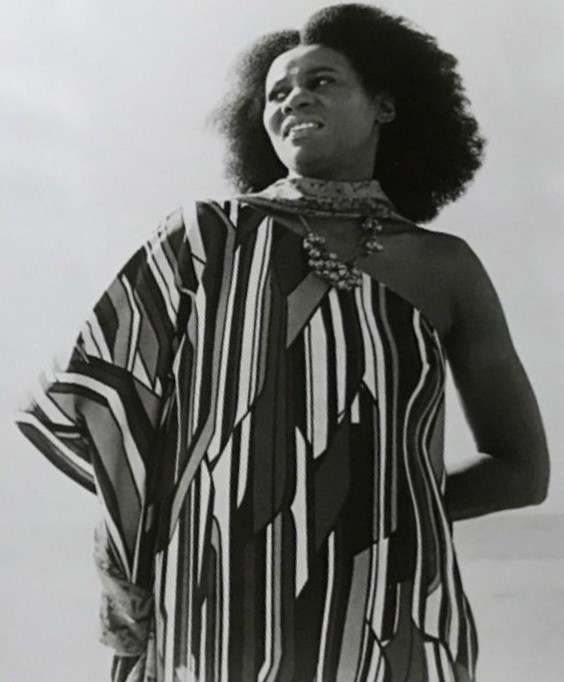
Alice Coltrane.

The most prominent form of sacred and liturgical jazz is the jazz mass. Although most often performed in a concert setting rather than church worship setting, this form has many examples. An eminent example of composers of the jazz mass was Mary Lou Williams. Williams converted to Catholicism in 1957, and proceeded to compose three masses in the jazz idiom. One was composed in 1968 to honor the recently assassinated Martin Luther King Jr. and the third was commissioned by a pontifical commission. It was performed once in 1975 in St Patrick's Cathedral in New York City. However the Catholic Church has not embraced jazz as appropriate for worship. In 1966 Joe Masters recorded "Jazz Mass" for Columbia Records. A jazz ensemble was joined by soloists and choir using the English text of the Roman Catholic Mass. Other examples include "Jazz Mass in Concert" by Lalo Schiffrin (Aleph Records, 1998, UPC 0651702632725) and "Jazz Mass" by Vince Guaraldi (Fantasy Records, 1965). In England, classical composer Will Todd recorded his "Jazz Missa Brevis" with a jazz ensemble, soloists and the St Martin's Voices on a 2018 Signum Records release, "Passion Music/Jazz Missa Brevis" also released as "Mass in Blue", and jazz organist James Taylor composed "The Rochester Mass" (Cherry Red Records, 2015). In 2013, Versace put forth bassist Ike Sturm and New York composer Deanna Witkowski as contemporary exemplars of sacred and liturgical jazz.

=== Jazz fusion ===
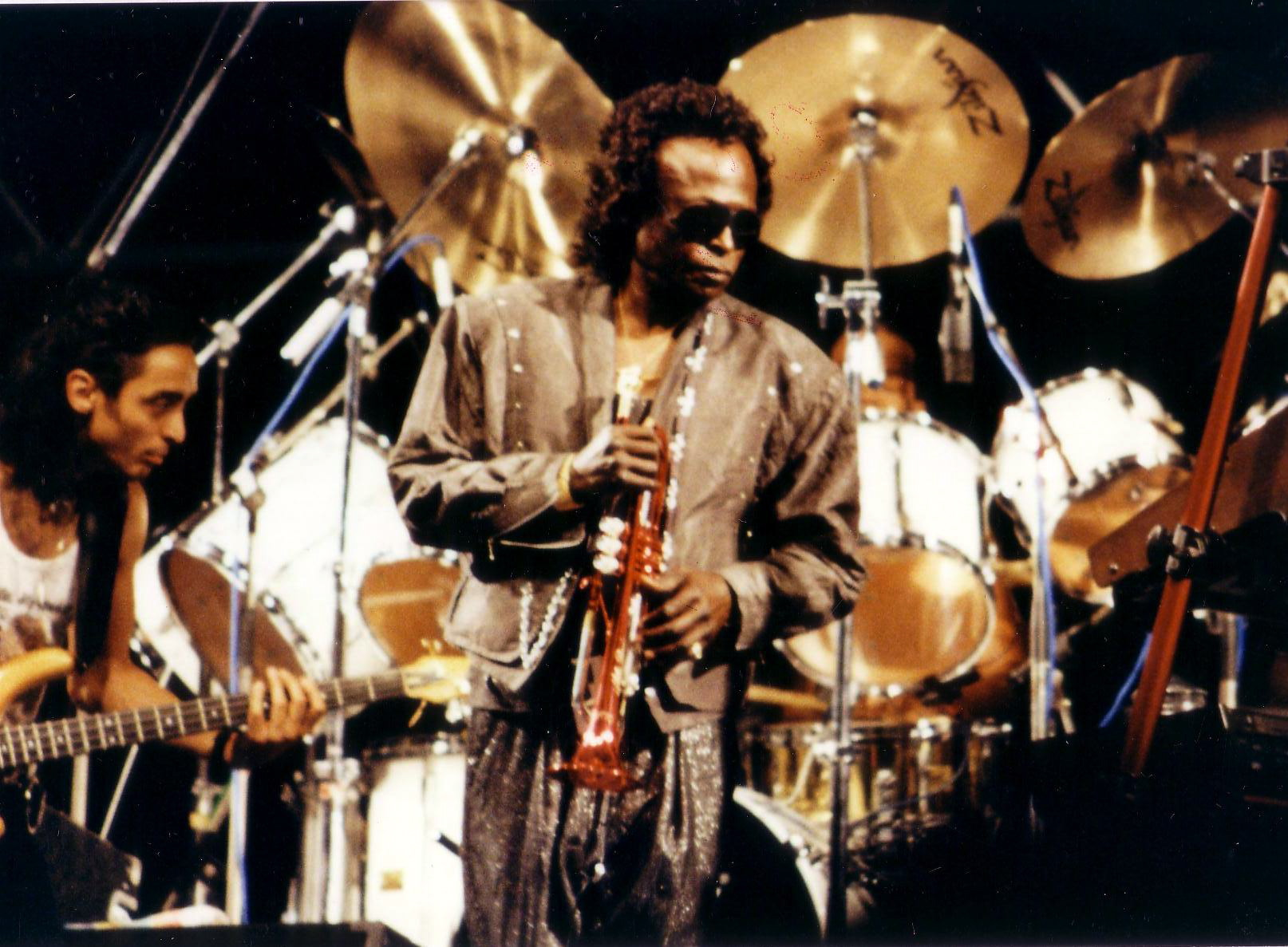
Fusion trumpeter Miles Davis in 1989

In the late 1960s and early 1970s, the hybrid form of jazz-rock fusion was developed by combining jazz improvisation with rock rhythms, electric instruments and the highly amplified stage sound of rock musicians such as Jimi Hendrix and Frank Zappa. Jazz fusion often uses mixed meters, odd time signatures, syncopation, complex chords, and harmonies.

According to AllMusic:

... until around 1967, the worlds of jazz and rock were nearly completely separate. [However, ...] as rock became more creative and its musicianship improved, and as some in the jazz world became bored with hard bop and did not want to play strictly avant-garde music, the two different idioms began to trade ideas and occasionally combine forces.

==== Miles Davis's new directions ====
In 1969, Davis fully embraced the electric instrument approach to jazz with In a Silent Way, which can be considered his first fusion album. Composed of two side-long suites edited heavily by producer Teo Macero, this quiet, static album would be equally influential to the development of ambient music.

As Davis recalls:

The music I was really listening to in 1968 was James Brown, the great guitar player Jimi Hendrix, and a new group who had just come out with a hit record, "Dance to the Music", Sly and the Family Stone ... I wanted to make it more like rock. When we recorded In a Silent Way I just threw out all the chord sheets and told everyone to play off of that.

Two contributors to In a Silent Way also joined organist Larry Young to create one of the early acclaimed fusion albums: Emergency! (1969) by The Tony Williams Lifetime.

==== Psychedelic-jazz ====
===== Weather Report =====
Weather Report's self-titled electronic and psychedelic Weather Report debut album caused a sensation in the jazz world on its arrival in 1971, thanks to the pedigree of the group's members (including percussionist Airto Moreira), and their unorthodox approach to music. The album featured a softer sound than would be the case in later years (predominantly using acoustic bass with Shorter exclusively playing soprano saxophone, and with no synthesizers involved), but is still considered a classic of early fusion. It built on the avant-garde experiments which Joe Zawinul and Shorter had pioneered with Miles Davis on Bitches Brew, including an avoidance of head-and-chorus composition in favor of continuous rhythm and movement – but took the music further. To emphasize the group's rejection of standard methodology, the album opened with the inscrutable avant-garde atmospheric piece "Milky Way", which featured by Shorter's extremely muted saxophone inducing vibrations in Zawinul's piano strings while the latter pedaled the instrument. DownBeat described the album as "music beyond category", and awarded it Album of the Year in the magazine's polls that year.

Weather Report's subsequent releases were creative funk-jazz works.

==== Jazz-rock ====
Although some jazz purists protested against the blend of jazz and rock, many jazz innovators crossed over from the contemporary hard bop scene into fusion. As well as the electric instruments of rock (such as electric guitar, electric bass, electric piano and synthesizer keyboards), fusion also used the powerful amplification, "fuzz" pedals, wah-wah pedals and other effects that were used by 1970s-era rock bands. Notable performers of jazz fusion included Miles Davis, Eddie Harris, keyboardists Joe Zawinul, Chick Corea, and Herbie Hancock, vibraphonist Gary Burton, drummer Tony Williams, violinist Jean-Luc Ponty, guitarists Larry Coryell, Al Di Meola, John McLaughlin, Ryo Kawasaki, and Frank Zappa, saxophonist Wayne Shorter and bassists Jaco Pastorius and Stanley Clarke. Jazz fusion was also popular in Japan, where the band Casiopea released more than thirty fusion albums.

According to jazz writer Stuart Nicholson, "just as free jazz appeared on the verge of creating a whole new musical language in the 1960s ... jazz-rock briefly suggested the promise of doing the same" with albums such as Williams's Emergency! (1970) and Davis's Agharta (1975), which Nicholson said "suggested the potential of evolving into something that might eventually define itself as a wholly independent genre quite apart from the sound and conventions of anything that had gone before." This development was stifled by commercialism, Nicholson said, as the genre "mutated into a peculiar species of jazz-inflected pop music that eventually took up residence on FM radio" at the end of the 1970s.

==== Electronic music ====
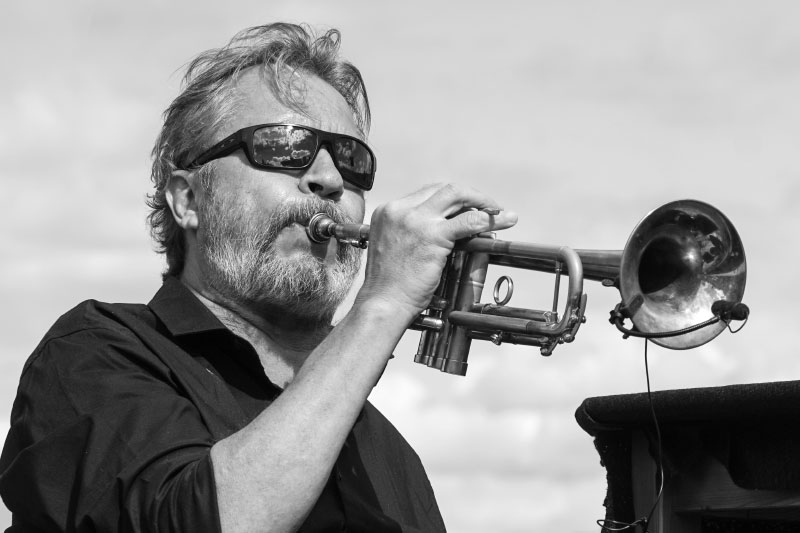
Nils Petter Molvær is considered a pioneer of future jazz, a genre that fuses jazz and electronic music.

Although jazz-rock fusion reached the height of its popularity in the 1970s, the use of electronic instruments and rock-derived musical elements in jazz continued in the 1990s and 2000s. Musicians using this approach include Pat Metheny, John Abercrombie, John Scofield and the Swedish group e.s.t. Since the beginning of the 1990s, electronic music had significant technical improvements that popularized and created new possibilities for the genre. Jazz elements such as improvisation, rhythmic complexities and harmonic textures were introduced to the genre and consequently had a big impact in new listeners and in some ways kept the versatility of jazz relatable to a newer generation that did not necessarily relate to what the traditionalists call real jazz (bebop, cool and modal jazz). Artists such as Squarepusher, Aphex Twin, Flying Lotus and sub genres like IDM, drum 'n' bass, jungle and techno ended up incorporating a lot of these elements. Squarepusher being cited as one big influence for jazz performers drummer Mark Guiliana and pianist Brad Mehldau, showing the correlations between jazz and electronic music are a two-way street.

=== Jazz-funk ===
By the mid-1970s, the sound known as jazz-funk had developed, characterized by a strong back beat (groove), electrified sounds and, often, the presence of electronic analog synthesizers. Jazz-funk also draws influences from traditional African music, Afro-Cuban rhythms and Jamaican reggae, notably Kingston bandleader Sonny Bradshaw. Another feature is the shift of emphasis from improvisation to composition: arrangements, melody and overall writing became important. The integration of funk, soul, and R&B music into jazz resulted in the creation of a genre whose spectrum is wide and ranges from strong jazz improvisation to soul, funk or disco with jazz arrangements, jazz riffs and jazz solos, and sometimes soul vocals.

Early examples are Herbie Hancock's Headhunters band and Miles Davis's On the Corner album, which, in 1972, began Davis's foray into jazz-funk and was, he claimed, an attempt at reconnecting with the young black audience which had largely forsaken jazz for rock and funk. While there is a discernible rock and funk influence in the timbres of the instruments employed, other tonal and rhythmic textures, such as the Indian tambora and tablas and Cuban congas and bongos, create a multi-layered soundscape. The album was a culmination of sorts of the musique concrète approach that Davis and producer Teo Macero had begun to explore in the late 1960s.

=== Straight-ahead jazz ===
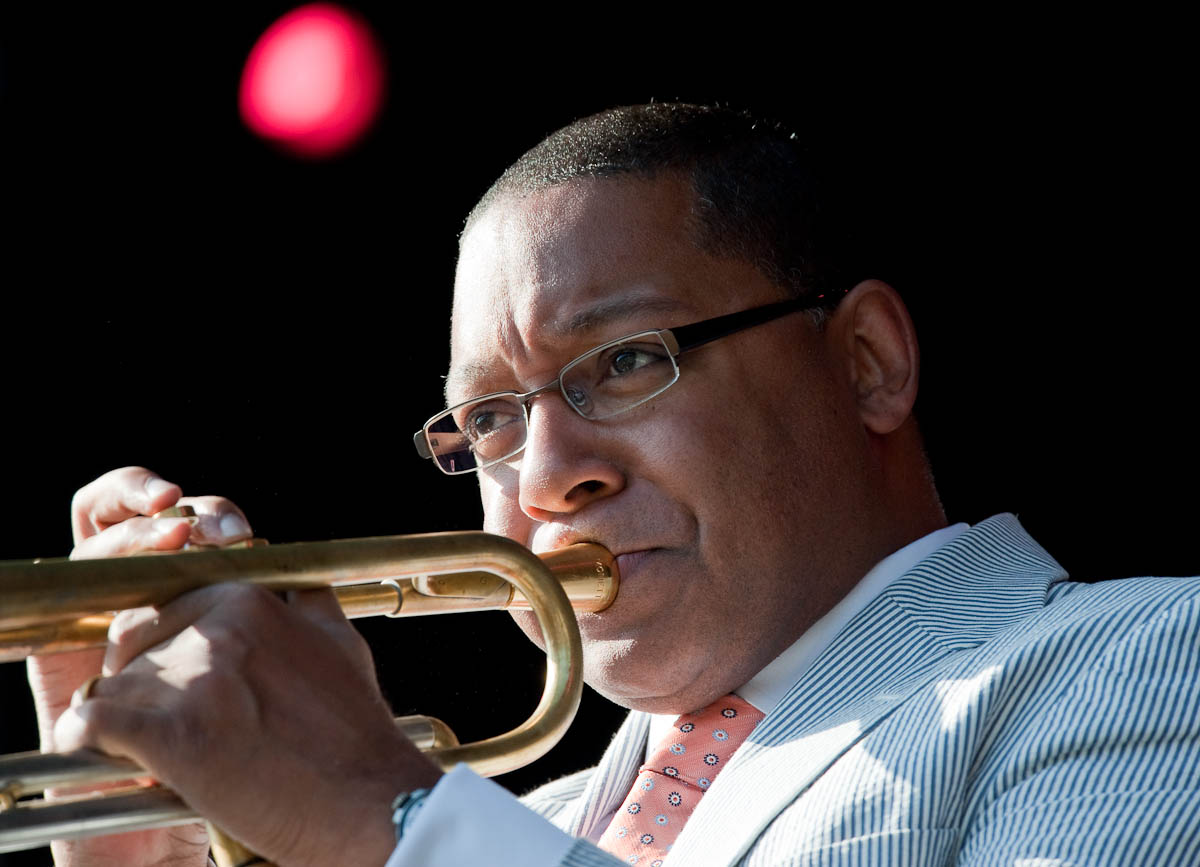
Wynton Marsalis

The 1980s saw something of a reaction against the fusion and free jazz that had dominated the 1970s. Trumpeter Wynton Marsalis emerged early in the decade, and strove to create music within what he believed was the tradition, rejecting both fusion and free jazz and creating extensions of the small and large forms initially pioneered by artists such as Louis Armstrong and Duke Ellington, as well as the hard bop of the 1950s. It is debatable whether Marsalis's critical and commercial success was a cause or a symptom of the reaction against Fusion and Free Jazz and the resurgence of interest in the kind of jazz pioneered in the 1960s (particularly modal jazz and post-bop); nonetheless there were many other manifestations of a resurgence of traditionalism, even if fusion and free jazz were by no means abandoned and continued to develop and evolve.

For example, several musicians who had been prominent in the fusion genre during the 1970s began to record acoustic jazz once more, including Chick Corea and Herbie Hancock. Other musicians who had experimented with electronic instruments in the previous decade had abandoned them by the 1980s; for example, Bill Evans, Joe Henderson, and Stan Getz. Even the 1980s music of Miles Davis, although certainly still fusion, adopted a far more accessible and recognizably jazz-oriented approach than his abstract work of the mid-1970s, such as a return to a theme-and-solos approach.

A similar reaction took place against free jazz. According to Ted Gioia:

the very leaders of the avant garde started to signal a retreat from the core principles of free jazz. Anthony Braxton began recording standards over familiar chord changes. Cecil Taylor played duets in concert with Mary Lou Williams, and let her set out structured harmonies and familiar jazz vocabulary under his blistering keyboard attack. And the next generation of progressive players would be even more accommodating, moving inside and outside the changes without thinking twice. Musicians such as David Murray or Don Pullen may have felt the call of free-form jazz, but they never forgot all the other ways one could play African-American music for fun and profit.

Pianist Keith Jarrett—whose bands of the 1970s had played only original compositions with prominent free jazz elements—established his so-called 'Standards Trio' in 1983, which, although also occasionally exploring collective improvisation, has primarily performed and recorded jazz standards. Chick Corea similarly began exploring jazz standards in the 1980s, having neglected them for the 1970s.

In 1987, the United States House of Representatives and Senate passed a bill proposed by Democratic Representative John Conyers Jr. to define jazz as a unique form of American music, stating "jazz is hereby designated as a rare and valuable national American treasure to which we should devote our attention, support and resources to make certain it is preserved, understood and promulgated." It passed in the House on September 23, 1987, and in the Senate on November 4, 1987.

In 2001, Ken Burns's documentary Jazz premiered on PBS, featuring Wynton Marsalis and other experts reviewing the entire history of American jazz to that time. It received some criticism, however, for its failure to reflect the many distinctive non-American traditions and styles in jazz that had developed, and its limited representation of US developments in the last quarter of the 20th century.

==== Neo-bop ====
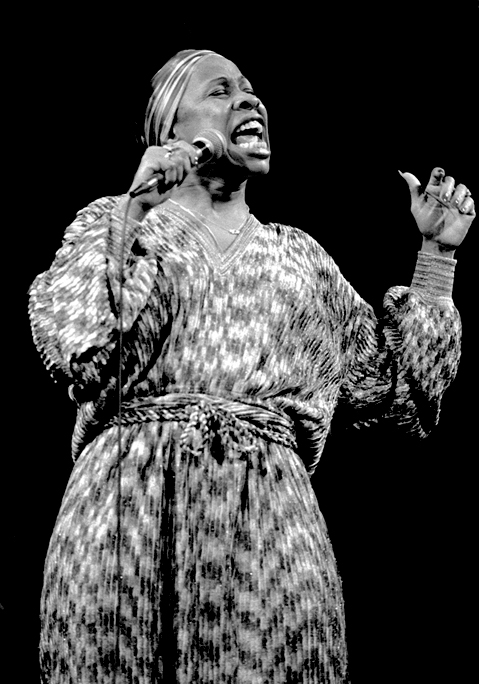
Betty Carter.

The emergence of young jazz talent beginning to perform in older, established musicians' groups further impacted the resurgence of traditionalism in the jazz community. In the 1970s, the groups of Betty Carter and Art Blakey and the Jazz Messengers retained their conservative jazz approaches in the midst of fusion and jazz-rock, and in addition to difficulty booking their acts, struggled to find younger generations of personnel to authentically play traditional styles such as hard bop and bebop. In the late 1970s, however, a resurgence of younger jazz players in Blakey's band began to occur. This movement included musicians such as Valery Ponomarev and Bobby Watson, Dennis Irwin and James Williams. In the 1980s, in addition to Wynton and Branford Marsalis, the emergence of pianists in the Jazz Messengers such as Donald Brown, Mulgrew Miller, and later, Benny Green, bassists such as Charles Fambrough, Lonnie Plaxico (and later, Peter Washington and Essiet Essiet) horn players such as Bill Pierce, Donald Harrison and later Javon Jackson and Terence Blanchard emerged as talented jazz musicians, all of whom made significant contributions in the 1990s and 2000s.

The young Jazz Messengers' contemporaries, including Roy Hargrove, Marcus Roberts, Wallace Roney and Mark Whitfield were also influenced by Wynton Marsalis's emphasis toward jazz tradition. These younger rising stars rejected avant-garde approaches and instead championed the acoustic jazz sound of Charlie Parker, Thelonious Monk and early recordings of the first Miles Davis quintet. This group of "Young Lions" sought to reaffirm jazz as a high art tradition comparable to the discipline of classical music.

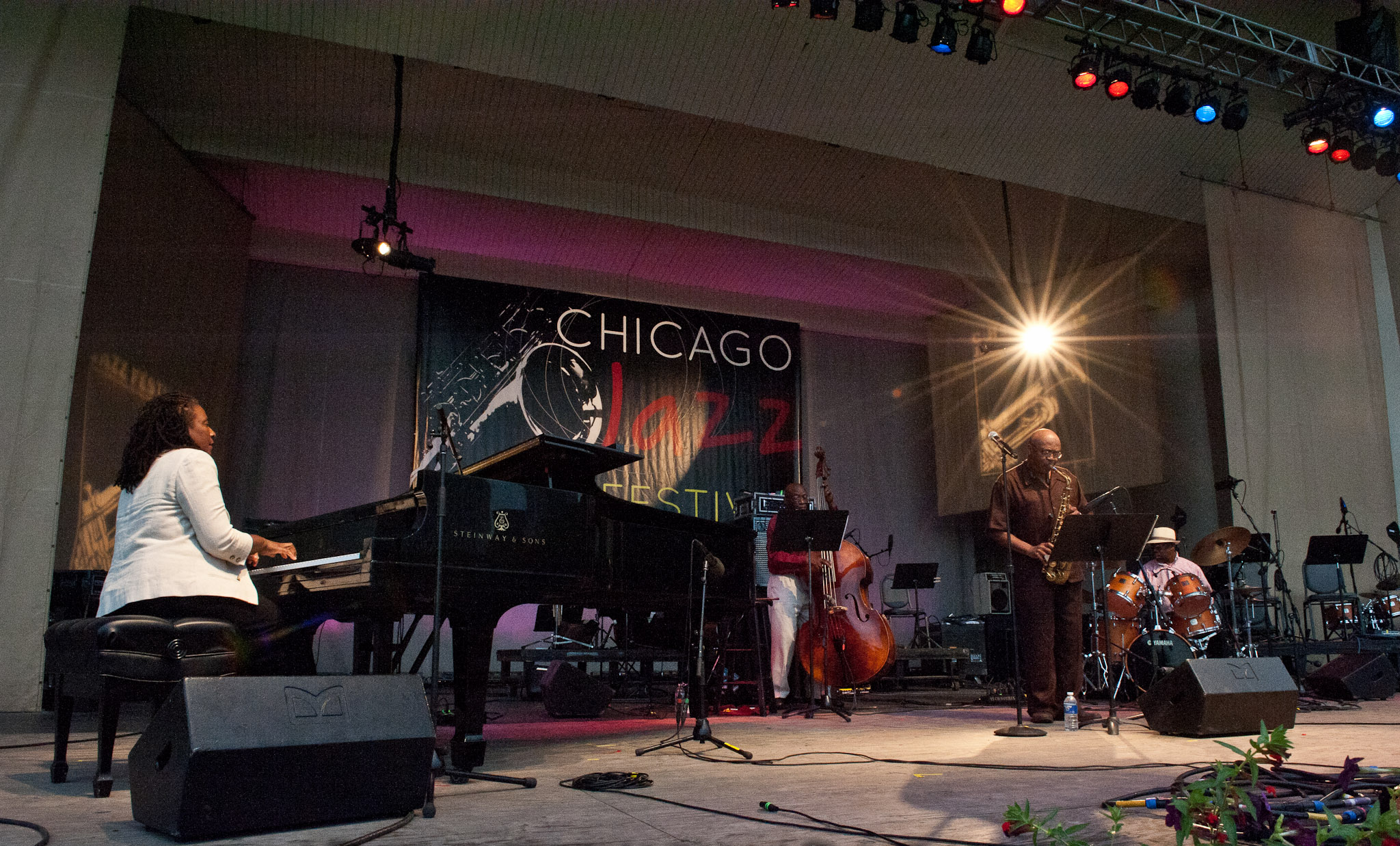
Geri Allen with Reggie Workman and Oliver Lake.

In addition, Betty Carter's rotation of young musicians in her group foreshadowed many of New York's preeminent traditional jazz players later in their careers. Among these musicians were Jazz Messenger alumni Benny Green, Branford Marsalis and Ralph Peterson Jr., as well as Kenny Washington, Lewis Nash, Curtis Lundy, Cyrus Chestnut, Mark Shim, Craig Handy, Greg Hutchinson and Marc Cary, Taurus Mateen and Geri Allen. O.T.B. ensemble included a rotation of young jazz musicians such as Kenny Garrett, Steve Wilson, Kenny Davis, Renee Rosnes, Ralph Peterson Jr., Billy Drummond, and Robert Hurst.

Starting in the 1990s, a number of players from largely straight-ahead or post-bop backgrounds emerged as a result of the rise of neo-traditionalist jazz, including pianists Jason Moran and Vijay Iyer, guitarist Kurt Rosenwinkel, vibraphonist Stefon Harris, trumpeters Roy Hargrove and Terence Blanchard, saxophonists Chris Potter and Joshua Redman, clarinetist Ken Peplowski and bassist Christian McBride.

=== Smooth jazz ===
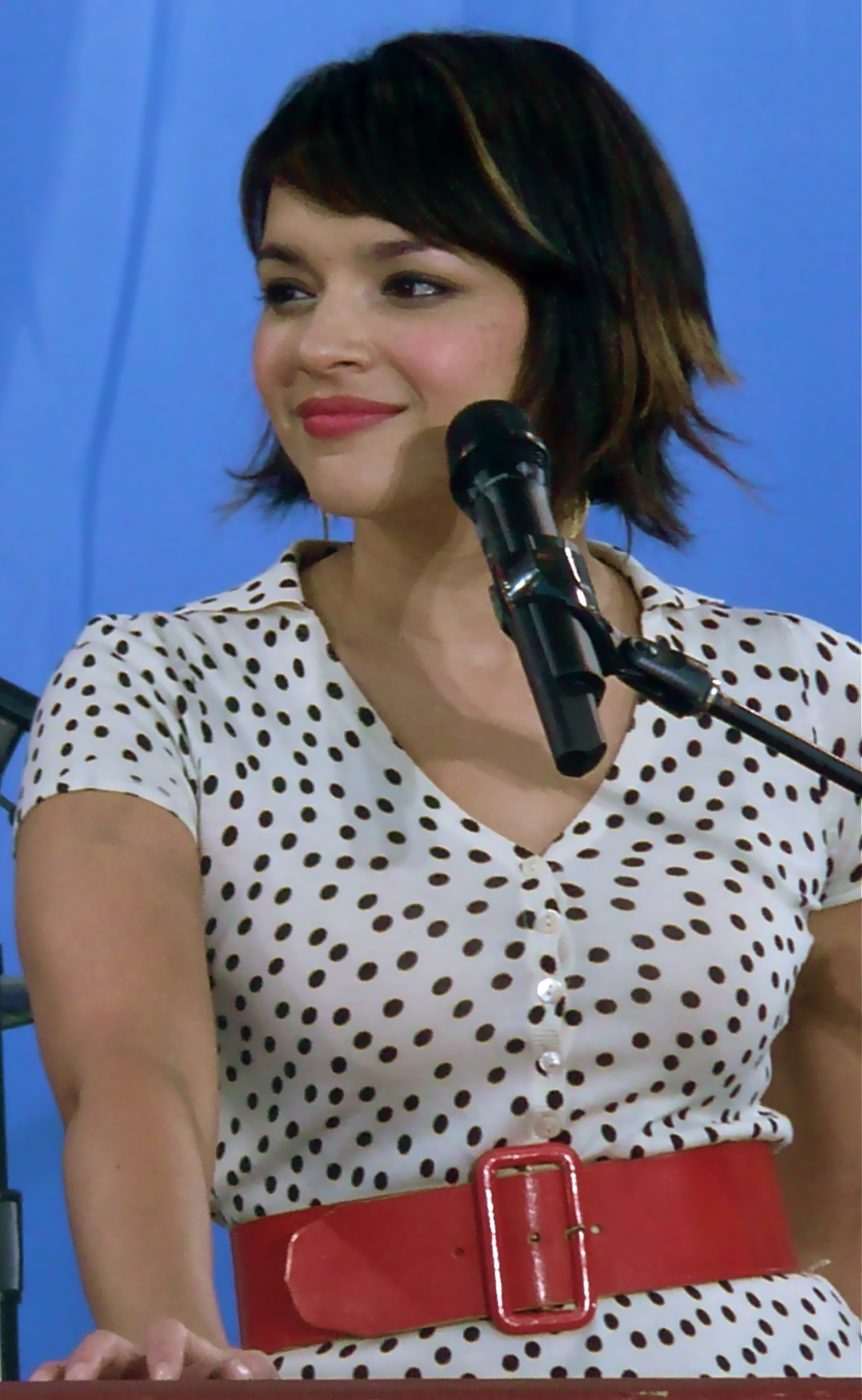
Norah Jones.

In the early 1980s, a commercial form of jazz fusion called "pop fusion" or "smooth jazz" became successful, garnering significant radio airplay in "quiet storm" time slots at radio stations in urban markets across the U.S. This helped to establish or bolster the careers of vocalists including Al Jarreau, Anita Baker, Chaka Khan, and Sade, as well as saxophonists including Grover Washington Jr., Kenny G, Kirk Whalum, Boney James, and David Sanborn. In general, smooth jazz is downtempo (the most widely played tracks are of 90–105 beats per minute), and has a lead melody-playing instrument (saxophone, especially soprano and tenor, and legato electric guitar are popular).

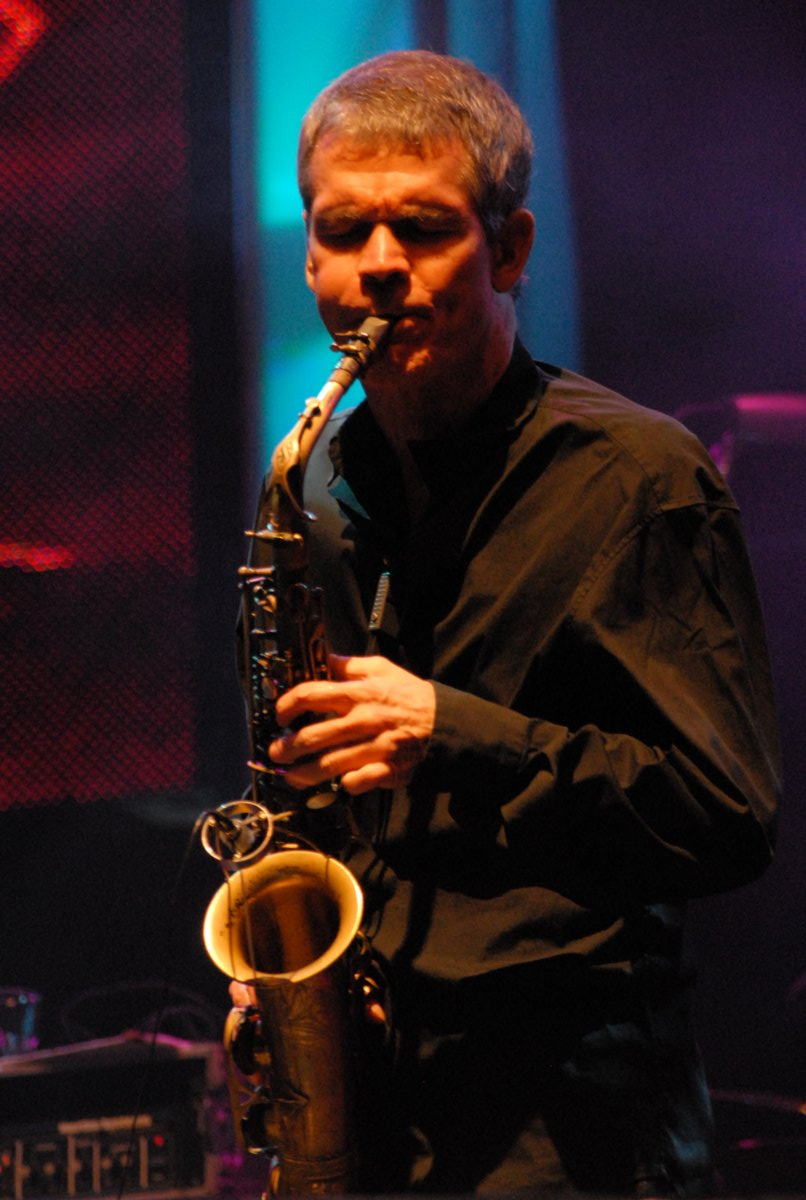
David Sanborn, 2008

In his Newsweek article "The Problem With Jazz Criticism", Stanley Crouch considers Miles Davis's playing of fusion to be a turning point that led to smooth jazz. Critic Aaron J. West has countered the often negative perceptions of smooth jazz, stating:

I challenge the prevalent marginalization and malignment of smooth jazz in the standard jazz narrative. Furthermore, I question the assumption that smooth jazz is an unfortunate and unwelcomed evolutionary outcome of the jazz-fusion era. Instead, I argue that smooth jazz is a long-lived musical style that merits multi-disciplinary analyses of its origins, critical dialogues, performance practice, and reception.

=== Acid jazz, nu jazz, and jazz rap ===
Acid jazz developed in the UK in the 1980s and 1990s, influenced by jazz-funk and electronic dance music. Acid jazz often contains various types of electronic composition (sometimes including sampling or live DJ cutting and scratching), but it is just as likely to be played live by musicians, who often showcase jazz interpretation as part of their performance. Richard S. Ginell of AllMusic considers Roy Ayers "one of the prophets of acid jazz".

Nu jazz is influenced by jazz harmony and melodies, and there are usually no improvisational aspects. It can be very experimental in nature and can vary widely in sound and concept. It ranges from the combination of live instrumentation with the beats of jazz house (as exemplified by St Germain, Jazzanova, and Fila Brazillia) to more band-based improvised jazz with electronic elements (for example, The Cinematic Orchestra, Kobol and the Norwegian "future jazz" style pioneered by Bugge Wesseltoft, Jaga Jazzist, and Nils Petter Molvær).

Jazz rap developed in the late 1980s and early 1990s and incorporates jazz influences into hip-hop. In 1988, Gang Starr released the debut single "Words I Manifest", which sampled Dizzy Gillespie's 1962 "Night in Tunisia", and Stetsasonic released "Talkin' All That Jazz", which sampled Lonnie Liston Smith. Gang Starr's debut LP No More Mr. Nice Guy (1989) and their 1990 track "Jazz Thing" sampled Charlie Parker and Ramsey Lewis. The groups which made up the Native Tongues Posse tended toward jazzy releases: these include the Jungle Brothers' debut Straight Out the Jungle (1988), and A Tribe Called Quest's People's Instinctive Travels and the Paths of Rhythm (1990) and The Low End Theory (1991). Rap duo Pete Rock & CL Smooth incorporated jazz influences on their 1992 debut Mecca and the Soul Brother. Rapper Guru's Jazzmatazz series began in 1993 using jazz musicians during the studio recordings.

Although jazz rap had achieved little mainstream success, Miles Davis's final album Doo-Bop (released posthumously in 1992) was based on hip-hop beats and collaborations with producer Easy Mo Bee. Davis's ex-bandmate Herbie Hancock also absorbed hip-hop influences in the mid-1990s, releasing the album Dis Is da Drum in 1994.

The mid-2010s saw an increased influence of R&B, hip-hop, and pop music on jazz. In 2015, Kendrick Lamar released his third studio album, To Pimp a Butterfly. The album heavily featured prominent contemporary jazz artists such as Thundercat and redefined jazz rap with a larger focus on improvisation and live soloing rather than simply sampling. In that same year, saxophonist Kamasi Washington released his nearly three-hour long debut, The Epic. Its hip-hop inspired beats and R&B vocal interludes was not only acclaimed by critics for being innovative in keeping jazz relevant, but also sparked a small resurgence in jazz on the internet.

=== Punk jazz and jazzcore ===
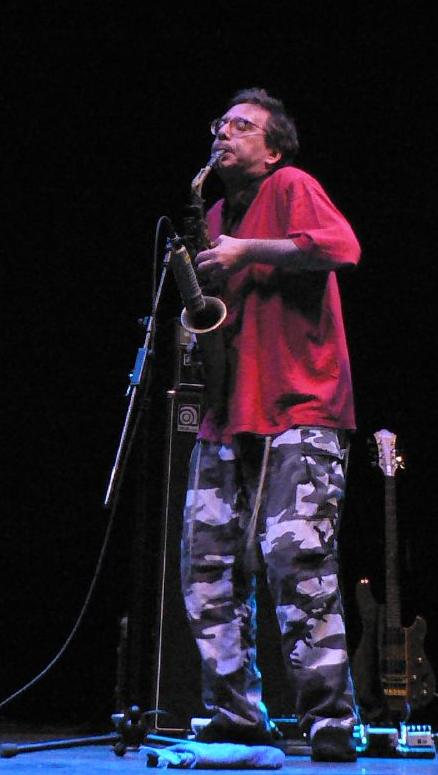
John Zorn performing in 2006

The relaxation of orthodoxy which was concurrent with post-punk in London and New York City led to a new appreciation of jazz. In London, the Pop Group began to mix free jazz and dub reggae into their brand of punk rock. In New York, No Wave took direct inspiration from both free jazz and punk. Examples of this style include Lydia Lunch's Queen of Siam, Gray, the work of James Chance and the Contortions (who mixed Soul with free jazz and punk) and the Lounge Lizards (the first group to call themselves "punk jazz").

John Zorn took note of the emphasis on speed and dissonance that was becoming prevalent in punk rock, and incorporated this into free jazz with the release of the Spy vs. Spy album in 1986, a collection of Ornette Coleman tunes done in the contemporary thrashcore style. In the same year, Sonny Sharrock, Peter Brötzmann, Bill Laswell, and Ronald Shannon Jackson recorded the first album under the name Last Exit, a similarly aggressive blend of thrash and free jazz. These developments are the origins of jazzcore, the fusion of free jazz with hardcore punk.

=== M-Base ===
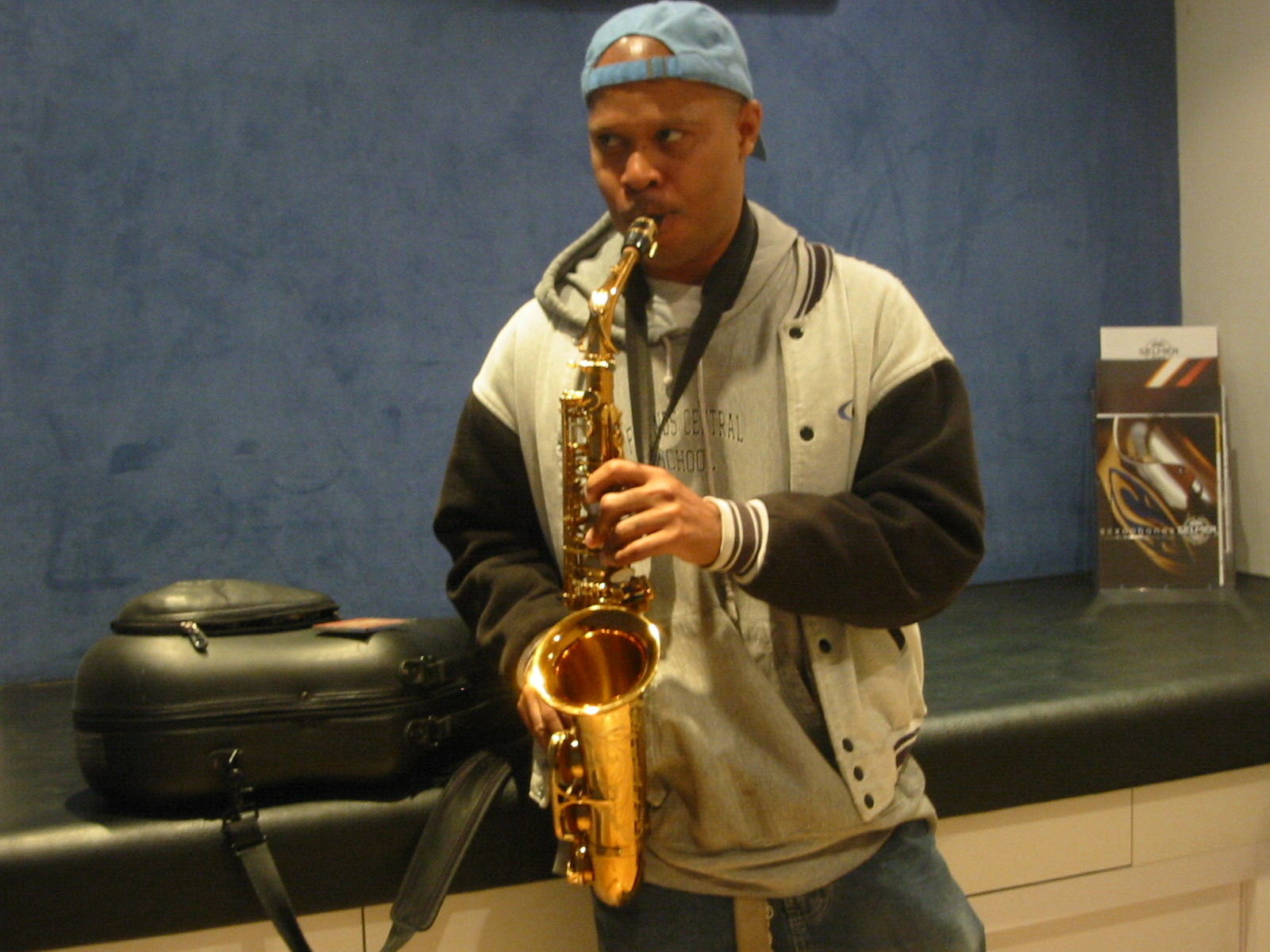
Steve Coleman in Paris, July 2004

The M-Base movement started in the 1980s, when a loose collective of young African-American musicians in New York that included Steve Coleman, Greg Osby, and Gary Thomas developed a complex but grooving sound.

In the 1990s, most M-Base participants turned to more conventional music, but Coleman, the most active participant, continued developing his music in accordance with the M-Base concept.

Coleman's audience decreased, but his music and concepts influenced many musicians, according to pianist Vijay Iver and critic Ben Ratlifff of The New York Times.

M-Base changed from a movement of a loose collective of young musicians to a kind of informal Coleman "school", with a much advanced but already originally implied concept. Steve Coleman's music and M-Base concept gained recognition as "next logical step" after Charlie Parker, John Coltrane, and Ornette Coleman.

=== Jazz pluralism ===
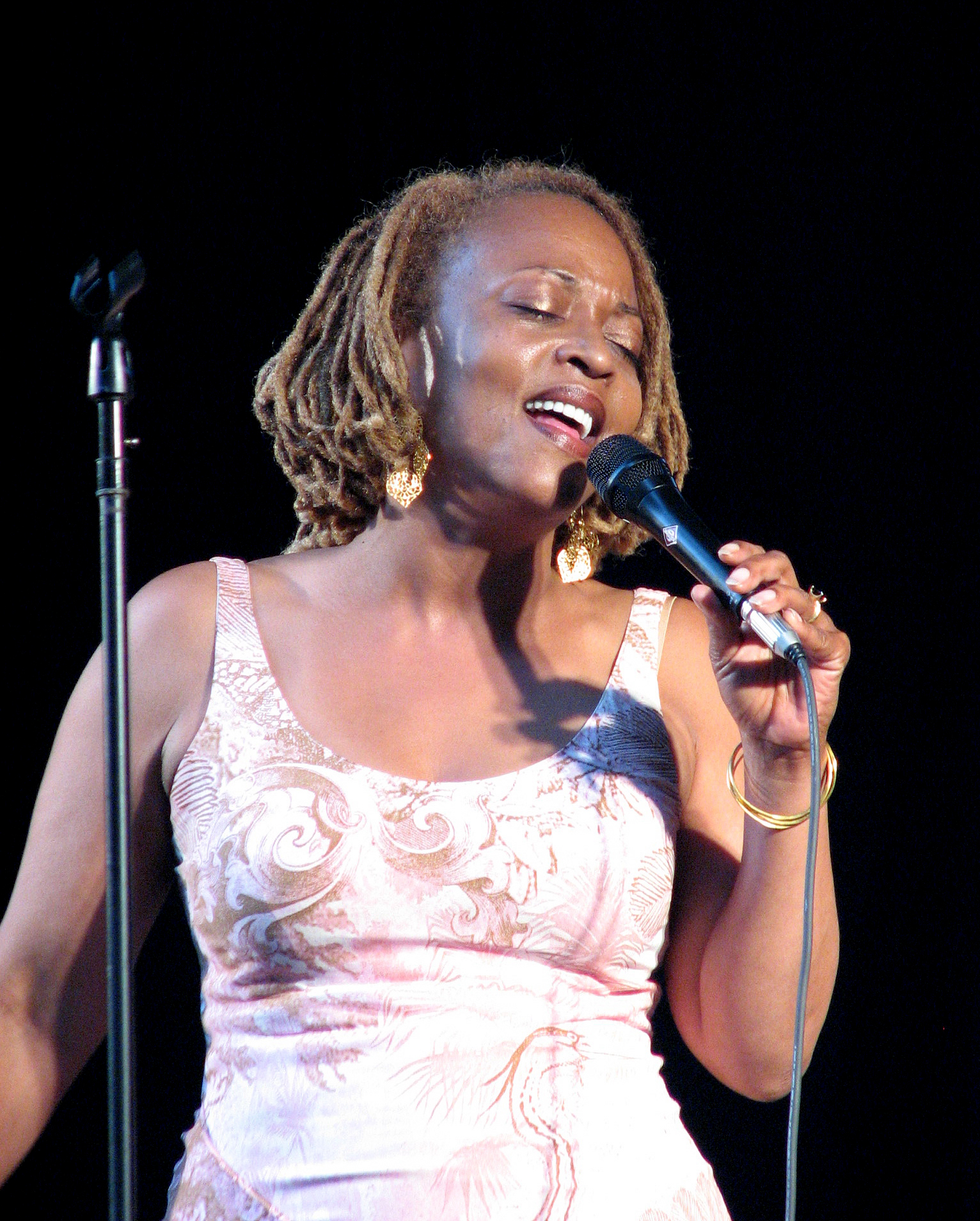
Cassandra Wilson.

Since the 1990s, jazz has been characterized by a pluralism in which no one style dominates, but rather a wide range of styles and genres are popular. Individual performers often play in a variety of styles, sometimes in the same performance. Pianist Brad Mehldau and The Bad Plus have explored contemporary rock music within the context of the traditional jazz acoustic piano trio, recording instrumental jazz versions of songs by rock musicians. The Bad Plus have also incorporated elements of free jazz into their music. A firm avant-garde or free jazz stance has been maintained by some players, such as saxophonists Greg Osby and Charles Gayle, while others, such as James Carter, have incorporated free jazz elements into a more traditional framework.

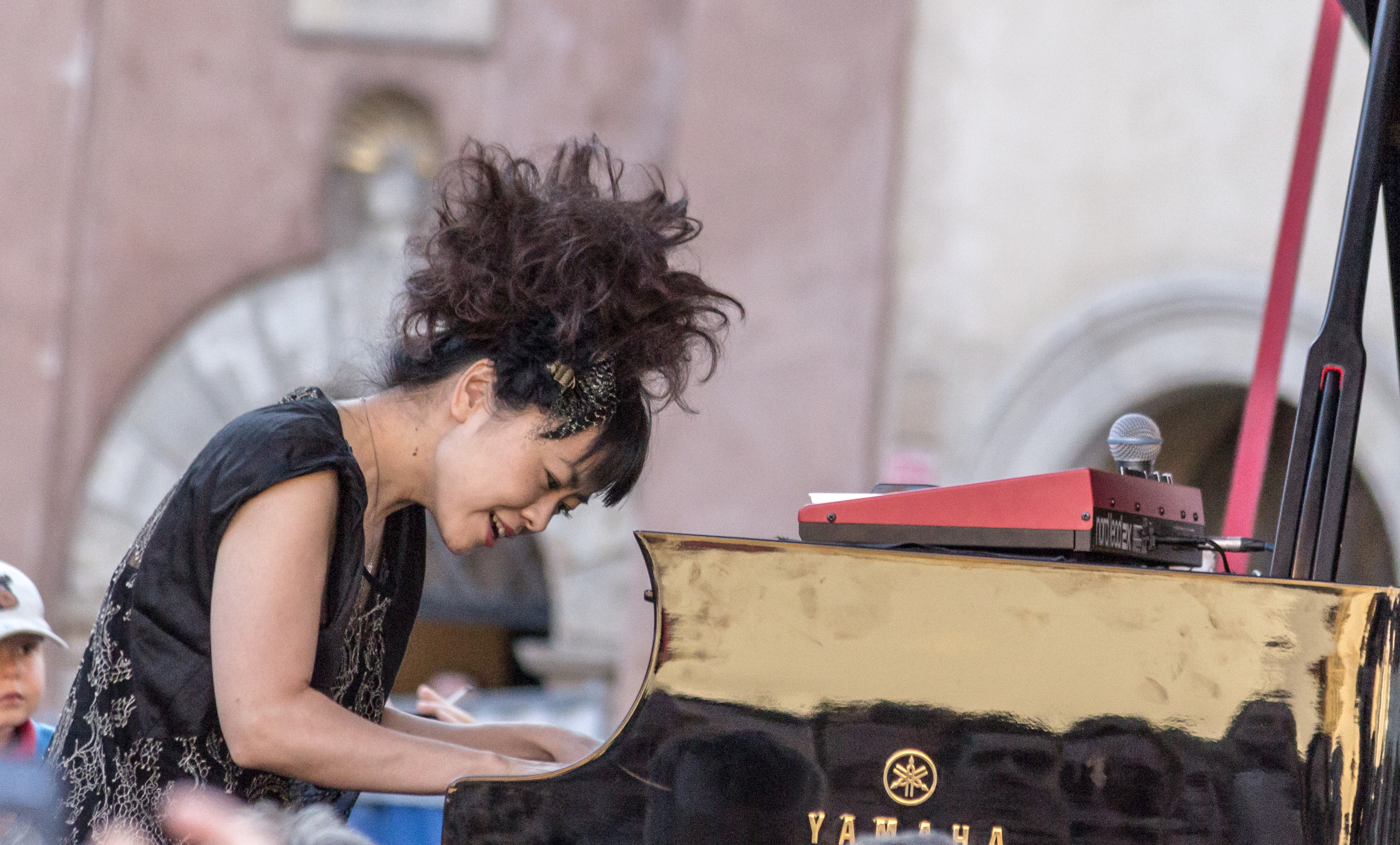
Hiromi Uehara Japanese jazz pianist and composer known for her virtuosic playing and innovative fusion of jazz, classical, and progressive rock elements in her music.

Harry Connick Jr. began his career playing stride piano and the Dixieland jazz of his home, New Orleans, beginning with his first recording when he was 10 years old. Some of his earliest lessons were at the home of pianist Ellis Marsalis. Connick had success on the pop charts after recording the soundtrack to the movie When Harry Met Sally, which sold over two million copies. Crossover success has also been achieved by Diana Krall, Norah Jones, Cassandra Wilson, Kurt Elling, and Jamie Cullum.

Additionally, the era saw the release of recordings and videos from the previous century, such as a Just Jazz tape broadcast by a band led by Gene Ammons and studio archives such as Just Coolin' by Art Blakey and the Jazz Messengers.

==== Social media ====
An internet-aided trend of 2010s jazz was that of extreme reharmonization, inspired by both virtuosic players known for their speed and rhythm such as Art Tatum, as well as players known for their ambitious voicings and chords such as Bill Evans. Supergroup Snarky Puppy adopted this trend, allowing players like Cory Henry to shape the grooves and harmonies of modern jazz soloing. YouTube phenomenon Jacob Collier also gained recognition for his ability to play an incredibly large number of instruments and his ability to use microtones, advanced polyrhythms, and blend a spectrum of genres in his largely homemade production process.

Other jazz musicians gained popularity through social media during the 2010s and 2020s. These included Joan Chamorro, a bassist and bandleader based in Barcelona whose big band and jazz combo videos have received tens of millions of views on YouTube, and Emmet Cohen, who broadcast a series of performances live from New York starting in March 2020.

== See also ==
- Jazz (Henri Matisse)
- Jazz piano
- Jazz royalty
- Victorian Jazz Archive
- Hogan Jazz Archive
- International Jazz Day
- Bibliography of jazz
- Timeline of jazz education
- List of certified jazz recordings
- List of jazz albums
- List of jazz arrangers
- List of jazz bassists
- List of jazz festivals
- List of jazz genres
- List of jazz musicians
- List of jazz standards
- List of jazz venues
- List of jazz venues in the United States
