= Brotherman in the Fatherland =

Live album by Rahsaan Roland Kirk
- Released: April 4, 2006
- Recorded: March 3, 1972
- Genre: Jazz
- Label: Rhino
- Producer: Joel Dorn

Rahsaan Roland Kirk chronology
Blacknuss (1971)	Brotherman in the Fatherland (2006)	I, Eye, Aye: Live at the Montreux Jazz Festival, 1972 (1996)

Brotherman in the Fatherland is an album by multi-instrumentalist Rahsaan Roland Kirk. It was recorded in concert in Hamburg, Germany, in 1972, with Ron Burton, Henry Metathias Pearson, Richie Goldberg and Joe Habao Texidor. The album was first released on the Hyena label in 2006.

== Reception ==
Professional ratings
Review scores
Source	Rating
AllMusic	3/5 stars
The Penguin Guide to Jazz	3/4 stars

The AllMusic review by Thom Jurek states "This gig, recorded in 1972, is one of those seemingly out-of-nowhere moments when Kirk, struggling to make a living, took it to the audience full-force... Like his best live outings — this one doesn't have the same sound quality as Bright Moments — this one is simply astonishing in its intensity, soul, and acumen. One can only wonder when hearing the polite applause at the end of the gig (instead of the justifiable shouting and screaming that should've been there) if the German crowd were just blown away, or confused. Listeners, too, may wonder if they can believe what has just transpired in the space of an hour. They can". The Penguin Guide to Jazz described the material chosen by Hyena as "shoddy selections". The JazzTimes reviewer wrote that "Kirk's instrumental versatility – as well as his improvisational virtuosity – shines through".

== Track listing ==
All compositions by Rahsaan Roland Kirk except as indicated.

1. "Intro/Like Sonny" (John Coltrane) - 8:32
2. "Make It with You" (David Gates) - 5:39
3. "Rahsaan's Spirit" - 7:04
4. "My Girl" (Smokey Robinson, Ronald White) - 5:15
5. "Seasons/Serenade to a Cuckoo" - 6:54
6. "Pedal Up" - 10:20
7. "Lush Life" (Billy Strayhorn) - 3:12
8. "Afro Blue" (Mongo Santamaría) - 4:04
9. "Blue Train" (Coltrane) - 17:31
  - Recorded at the Funkhaus in Hamburg, Germany on March 3, 1972

== Personnel ==
- Roland Kirk: tenor saxophone, manzello, stritch, clarinet, flute
- Ron Burton: piano
- Henry Metathias Pearson: bass
- Richie Goldberg: drums
- Joe Habad Texidor: percussion
