= I, Eye, Aye: Live at the Montreux Jazz Festival, 1972 =

Live album by Rahsaan Roland Kirk
- Released: 1996
- Recorded: June 24, 1972
- Genre: Jazz
- Label: Rhino

Rahsaan Roland Kirk chronology
Brotherman in the Fatherland (2006)	I, Eye, Aye: Live at the Montreux Jazz Festival, 1972 (1996)	Prepare Thyself to Deal With a Miracle (1973)

Professional ratings
Review scores
Source	Rating
Allmusic	4.5/5 stars
The Penguin Guide to Jazz Recordings	3/4 stars

I, Eye, Aye is a live album by jazz multi-instrumentalist Rahsaan Roland Kirk featuring performances by Kirk recorded at the Montreux Jazz Festival in 1972 with Ron Burton, Henry "Pete" Pearson, Robert Shy and Joe Habao Texidor first released on the Rhino label in 1996 on CD and on VHS under the title "The One Man Twins."

The Allmusic review by Thom Jurek states "The set is absolutely electrifying. From the few short raps Kirk offers the crowd, one cannot be prepared for the honking, shouting, funky, gritty sets that follow... This is a hell of an introduction to one of the least-understood figures in jazz history, and an absolute necessity for fans".

== Track listing ==
All compositions by Rahsaan Roland Kirk except as indicated.

1. "Rahsaantalk, No. 1" - 0:38
2. "Seasons" - 6:00
3. "Rahsaantalk, No. 2" - 1:12
4. "Balm in Gilead" (Traditional) - 7:05
5. "Volunteered Slavery" - 10:20
6. "Rahsaantalk, No. 3" - 0:24
7. "Blue Rol, No. 2" - 9:04
8. "Solo Piece: Satin Doll/Improvisation" (Duke Ellington/Kirk) - 4:19
9. "Serenade to a Cuckoo" - 3:28
10. "Pedal Up" - 6:11

- Recorded at the Montreux Jazz Festival, Switzerland on June 24, 1972

== Personnel ==
- Roland Kirk: tenor saxophone, manzello, stritch, clarinet, flute
- Ron Burton: piano
- Henry "Pete" Pearson: bass
- Robert Shy: drums
- Joe Habao Texidor: percussion
