= Lights Go Down =

Lights Go Down may refer to:

- "Lights Go Down", a song by Hayden James and Sidepiece from the 2022 album Lifted
- "Lights Go Down", a song by Matoma from the 2018 album One in a Million
- "Lights Go Down", a song by I Dont Know How but They Found Me from the 2020 album Razzmatazz

== Other uses ==
- "The Lights Go Down", a song by Electric Light Orchestra from the 1981 album Time

== See also ==
- "As the Lights Go Down", a 1984 concert video by Duran Duran
- Lights Go Out (disambiguation)
- Lights Down Low (disambiguation)
