= Now Please Don't You Cry, Beautiful Edith =

Studio album by Roland Kirk
- Released: June 1967
- Recorded: May 2, 1967
- Studio: Van Gelder Studio, Englewood Cliffs, NJ
- Genre: Jazz
- Length: 32:12
- Label: Verve
- Producer: Creed Taylor

Roland Kirk chronology
Slightly Latin (1965)	Now Please Don't You Cry, Beautiful Edith (1967)	The Inflated Tear (1967)

Now Please Don't You Cry, Beautiful Edith is an album by the jazz multi-instrumentalist Roland Kirk, released on the Verve label in 1967. It contains performances by Kirk with Lonnie Liston Smith, Ronnie Boykins and Grady Tate.

== Reception ==
Professional ratings
Review scores
Source	Rating
AllMusic	4.5/5 stars
The Penguin Guide to Jazz Recordings	3.5/4 stars

The AllMusic review by Thom Jurek states: "Now Please Don't You Cry, Beautiful Edith (about Kirk's wife) was the first of his all groove sides.... This was the beginning of the exploration that led listeners to Blacknuss and Boogie-Woogie String Along for Real, and it is worth every bit as those two recordings". Richard Cook and Brian Morton rated the CD reissue of the album, combined with the album Rip, Rig and Panic, with the second-highest grade in their Penguin Guide to Jazz, and named the reissue as part of their suggested "core collection" of essential recordings.

== Track listing ==
All compositions by Roland Kirk except as noted

1. "Blue Rol" - 6:09
2. "Alfie" (Burt Bacharach, Hal David) - 2:52
3. "Why Don't They Know" - 2:54
4. "Silverlization" - 4:57
5. "Fall Out" - 3:01
6. "Now Please Don't You Cry, Beautiful Edith" - 4:23
7. "Stompin' Grounds" - 4:46
8. "It's a Grand Night for Swinging" (Billy Taylor) - 3:10

== Personnel ==
- Roland Kirk: tenor saxophone, manzello, stritch, flute
- Lonnie Liston Smith: piano
- Ronnie Boykins: bass
- Grady Tate: drums
