= A Meeting of the Times =

Studio album by Rahsaan Roland Kirk
- Released: December 1972
- Recorded: March 14, 1965; March 30 & 31, 1972
- Genre: Jazz
- Length: 37:36
- Label: Atlantic

Rahsaan Roland Kirk chronology
Blacknuss (1971)	A Meeting of the Times (1972)	Prepare Thyself to Deal With a Miracle (1973)

Professional ratings
Review scores
Source	Rating
AllMusic	3/5 stars
The Penguin Guide to Jazz Recordings	👑

A Meeting of the Times is an album by jazz multi-instrumentalist Rahsaan Roland Kirk and vocalist Al Hibbler recorded in March 1972 in New York City, and released in December of that year. It features performances by Kirk and Hibbler with Hank Jones, Ron Carter and Grady Tate with an additional track recorded by Kirk with Leon Thomas, Lonnie Liston Smith, Major Holley and Charles Crosby from the sessions that produced Here Comes the Whistleman (1965).

== Reception ==
The AllMusic review by Scott Yanow states, "On first glance this LP combines together a pair of unlikely musical partners; the unique multi-instrumentalist Rahsaan Roland Kirk and Duke Ellington's former ballad singer Al Hibbler. However Rahsaan was very well acquainted with Ellington's music and he plays respectfully behind Hibbler on many of the standards, taking the wild 'Carney and Bigard Place' as an instrumental. Hibbler (who did not record much this late in his career) is in good voice and phrases as eccentrically as ever". The Penguin Guide to Jazz gives the album a four star rating (of a possible four) plus a special "Crown" accolade.

== Track listing ==
1. "Do Nothing till You Hear from Me" (Duke Ellington, Bob Russell) – 4:38
2. "Daybreak" (Ellington, John Latouche, Billy Strayhorn) – 3:12
3. "Lover, Come Back to Me" (Oscar Hammerstein II, Sigmund Romberg) – 3:48
4. "Don't Get Around Much Anymore" (Ellington, Russell) – 2:53
5. "This Love of Mine" (Sol Parker, Henry W. Sanicola Jr., Frank Sinatra) – 4:55
6. "Carney and Bigard Place" (Roland Kirk) – 5:34
7. "I Didn't Know About You" (Ellington, Russell) – 4:01
8. "Something 'Bout Believing" (Ellington) – 6:05
9. "Dream" (Kirk) – 2:30
  - Recorded at Atlantic Studios, NY on March 30 (tracks 2–4 & 8) & March 31 (tracks 1 & 5–7), 1972
  - and track 9 recorded live in New York City on March 14, 1965

== Personnel ==
- Rahsaan Roland Kirk: tenor saxophone, manzello, stritch, flute, clarinet, baritone saxophone
- Al Hibbler: vocals (tracks 1–5, 7 & 8)
- Hank Jones: piano (tracks 1–8)
- Ron Carter: bass (tracks 1–8)
- Grady Tate: drums (tracks 1–8)
- Leon Thomas: vocals (track 9)
- Lonnie Liston Smith: piano (track 9)
- Major Holley: bass (track 9)
- Charles Crosby: drums (track 9)
