= Kirkatron =

Studio album / live album by Rahsaan Roland Kirk
- Released: 1977
- Recorded: July 18, 1975 (live); 1975–1976 (studio)
- Genre: Jazz
- Label: Warner Bros.

Rahsaan Roland Kirk chronology
The Return of the 5000 Lb. Man (1976)	Kirkatron (1977)	Boogie-Woogie String Along for Real (1977)

Professional ratings
Review scores
Source	Rating
Allmusic	2.5/5 stars

Kirkatron is an album by jazz multi-instrumentalist Rahsaan Roland Kirk featuring performances by Kirk recorded at the Montreux Jazz Festival in 1975 and studio sessions from 1975 and 1976.

The Allmusic review by Scott Yanow states "Shortly after Rahsaan Roland Kirk finished his first album for Warner Brothers, he suffered a major stroke that put him out of action and greatly shortened his life. His second LP for the label was actually composed of leftovers from the earlier session plus three songs taken from an appearance at the Montreux Jazz Festival... This LP (which finds him mostly sticking to tenor), Kirk's next-to-last album, has enough highlights to make it worth searching for".

== Track listing ==
All compositions by Rahsaan Roland Kirk except as indicated

1. "Serenade to a Cuckoo" – 3.40
2. "This Masquerade" (Leon Russell) – 5.31
3. "Sugar" (Stanley Turrentine, Kirk) – 3.27
4. "Los Angeles Negro Chorus" – 0.26
5. "Steppin' into Beauty" – 6.42
6. "The Christmas Song" (Mel Torme, Robert Wells) – 3.34
7. "Bagpipe Medley" – 2.38
8. "Mary McLeod Bethune" – 0.24
9. "Bright Moments" (Kirk, Todd Barkan) – 4.14
10. "Lyriconon" – 4.10
11. "A Night in Tunisia" (Dizzy Gillespie, Frank Paparelli) – 4.59
12. "J. Griff's Blues" (trad., arr. Kirk) – 7.41
- Recorded at the Montreux Jazz Festival in Switzerland on 18 July 1975 (tracks 1, 7 & 12) and Regent Sound Studios, New York City, 1975 & 1976

== Personnel ==
- Roland Kirk – tenor saxophone, manzello, stritch, clarinet, flute
- Hilton Ruiz – piano, keyboards (tracks 1–3, 5, 7 & 10–12)
- Henry Pete Pearson – bass (tracks 1, 7, 10 & 12)
- Sonny Barkan – drums (tracks 1, 7 & 12)
- Todd Barkan – percussion (tracks 1, 7 & 12)
- Steve Turre – trombone (tracks 2–3, 5 & 11)
- Cornell Dupree – guitar (tracks 2 & 11)
- Richard Tee – keyboards (tracks 2 & 11)
- William S. Fischer – synthesizer (tracks 2 & 11)
- Gordon Edwards – electric bass (tracks 2 & 11)
- James Madison – drums (tracks 2 & 11)
- Ruddley Thibodeaux – percussion (tracks 2 & 11)
- Milton Suggs – bass (tracks 3 & 5)
- Walter Perkins – drums (tracks 3 & 5)
- Tony Waters – percussion (tracks 3 & 5)
- Michael Hill – vocals (tracks 3 & 5)
- Trudy Pitts – organ (track 6)
- William Butler – guitar (track 6 & 10)
- Bill Carney – drums (track 6)
- Sanford Allen – violin (track 6)
- Alfred Brown, Selwart Clarke – viola (track 6)
- Kermit Moore – cello (track 6)
- William S. Fischer – arranger, conductor (track 6)
- Howard Johnson – tuba (track 9)
- Romeo Penque – baritone saxophone, oboe (track 9)
- Buster Williams – bass (track 9)
- Charlie Persip – drums (track 9)
- Joe Habao Texidor – percussion, vocals (track 9)
- Betty Neals, Maeretha Stewart, Milt Grayson, Arthur Williams, Randy Peyton, Hilda Harris, Adrienne Albert, Francine Caroll – vocals (track 9)
- Frank Foster – arranger (track 9)
- Jerry Griffin – drums (track 10)
