= Prepare Thyself to Deal with a Miracle =

Prepare Thyself to Deal With a Miracle

Studio album by Rahsaan Roland Kirk
- Released: August 1973
- Recorded: January 22, 1973
- Genre: Jazz
- Label: Atlantic
- Producer: Joel Dorn

Rahsaan Roland Kirk chronology
A Meeting of the Times (1972)	Prepare Thyself to Deal With a Miracle (1973)	Bright Moments (1973)

Prepare Thyself to Deal With a Miracle is an album by jazz multi-instrumentalist Rahsaan Roland Kirk, released in August 1973. The album features performances by Charles McGhee, Dick Griffin, Harry Smiles, Sanford Allen, Julien Barber, Selwart Clarke, Gayle Dixon, Al Brown, Kermit Moore, Rahn Burton, Henry Mattathias Pearson, Robert Shy, Sonny Brown, Ralph MacDonald, Dee Dee Bridgewater and Jeanne Lee.

== Reception ==
Professional ratings
Review scores
Source	Rating
AllMusic	4/5 stars

Thom Jurek of AllMusic called it "yet another criminally underappreciated Rahsaan Roland Kirk recording from the last phase of a remarkable career". He stated that "this is perhaps Kirk's most experimental recording in that it involves his most involved performing on multiple horns and flutes—including his infamous and wonderful nose flute—and working with drones on a more surface level." while noting that "there are numerous metaphors and metonyms here, but they will not come to the listener until later, when she or he regains the conscious notion of breathing". Michael Patterson of The Morning Record was more critical, disliking the singles' length and calling the album "a bad bet" and "draggy". Eugene Chadbourne, writing for the Calgary Herald, stated that "it overcomes what can be considered Kirk's only shortcoming — his inability to channel all the bitterness, rage and beauty within him into one solid musical direction".

== Track listing ==
All compositions by Rahsaan Roland Kirk.

1. "Salvation and Reminiscing" – 5:22
2. "Seasons: One Mind Winter/Summer/Ninth Ghost" – 9:37
3. "Celestial Blues" – 5:40
4. "Saxophone Concerto: Saxophone Miracle/One Breath Beyond/Dance of Revolution" – 21:00

- Recorded at Regent Sound Studios, NYC, January 22, 1973

== Personnel ==
- Roland Kirk: tenor saxophone, clarinet, flute, nose flute, black mystery pipes, alto saxophone
- Charles McGhee: trumpet
- Dick Griffin: trombone
- Harry Smiles: oboe
- Sanford Allen, Julien Barber, Selwart Clarke, Gayle Dixon: violin
- Al Brown: viola
- Kermit Moore: cello
- Ron Burton: piano
- Henry Mattathias Pearson: bass
- Robert Shy: drums
- Sonny Brown, Ralph MacDonald: percussion
- Dee Dee Bridgewater, Jeanne Lee: vocals
