= Boogie-Woogie String Along for Real =

Studio album by Rahsaan Roland Kirk
- Released: 1977
- Recorded: July 18, 1975–1976
- Genre: Jazz
- Label: Warner Bros.
- Producer: Rahsaan Roland Kirk, Joel Dorn

Rahsaan Roland Kirk chronology
Kirkatron (1977)	Boogie-Woogie String Along for Real (1977)

Boogie-Woogie String Along for Real is the final album recorded by jazz multi-instrumentalist Rahsaan Roland Kirk, featuring performances by Kirk with string section and orchestra. It was recorded following a stroke which left him partially paralysed.

== Critical reception ==
Professional ratings
Review scores
Source	Rating
AllMusic	3.5/5 stars
The Rolling Stone Jazz Record Guide	3/5 stars

The Bay State Banner wrote that "Kirk's playing has certainly diminished since his stroke last year; it lacks the verve, strength and variety of earlier times, but his humor and satirical bite are still present."

The AllMusic review by Thom Jurek states: "The final album Rahsaan Roland Kirk ever recorded remains one of his finest. Post-stroke, Kirk struggled with his conception of the music he was trying to make. Boogie-Woogie String Along for Real is the payoff... The all-inclusive vision Kirk has of a music embraces all emotions and attitudes and leaves no one outside the door. This is Kirk's Black Classical Music, and it is fully realized on this final track and album."

== Track listing ==
All compositions by Rahsaan Roland Kirk except as indicated

1. "Boogie Woogie String Along for Real" – 8:52
2. "I Loves You, Porgy" (George Gershwin, Ira Gershwin, Dubose Heyward) – 1:51
3. "Make Me a Pallet on the Floor" (Traditional) – 7:14
4. "Hey Babebips" – 5:10
5. "In a Mellow Tone" (Duke Ellington, Milt Gabler) – 6:15
6. "Summertime" (Gershwin, Gershwin, Heyward) – 1:40
7. "Dorthaan's Walk" – 7:08
8. "Watergate Blues" (Percy Heath) – 6:35
  - Recorded at Regent Sound Studios, NYC, 1977

== Personnel ==
- Roland Kirk: tenor saxophone, harmonica, electric kalimba, clarinet, flute, vocals
- Steve Turre: trombone (tracks 1, 4, 7 & 8)
- Hilton Ruiz: keyboards (tracks 4, 7 & 8)
- Phil Bowler: bass (tracks 1, 4, 7 & 8)
- Sonny Brown: drums (tracks 1, 4, 7 & 8)
- Percy Heath: cello (tracks 4 & 8)
- Sammy Price: piano (tracks 1–3, 5 & 6)
- Tiny Grimes: guitar (tracks 2, 3, 5 & 6)
- Arvell Shaw: bass (tracks 2, 3, 5 & 6)
- Gifford McDonald: drums (tracks 2, 3, 5 & 6)
- William S. Fischer: arranger, electric piano (track 1)
- Eddie Preston: trumpet (track 1)
- Jimmy Buffington: French horn (track 1)
- Harold Kohon, Sanford Allen, Kathryn Kienke, Regis Iandiorio, Tony Posk, Yoko Matsuo, Doreen Callender: violin (track 1)
- Selwart Clarke, Linda Lawrence, Julien Barber: viola (track 1)
- Eugene Moye, Jonathan Abramowitz, Charles Fambrough: cello (track 1)
