= Trudy Pitts =

American soul jazz keyboardist

- Born: Gertrude E. Pitts; August 10, 1932; Philadelphia, Pennsylvania, US
- Died: December 19, 2010 (aged 78) Philadelphia, Pennsylvania
- Genres: Jazz
- Instruments: Organ, vocals
- Years active: 1950s–2000s

Gertrude E. "Trudy" Pitts (August 10, 1932 – December 19, 2010) was an American soul jazz keyboardist from Philadelphia, Pennsylvania. She was known primarily for playing the Hammond B3 organ.

== Biography ==
Trained as a musician and a music educator, Pitts studied at the Philadelphia Musical Academy (now the University of the Arts), Temple University, and Juilliard, as well as other institutions. Early work experience included a position as an assistant to the pianist in the Tony Award-winning musical Raisin.

At the end of the musical's tour, she was encouraged by her husband (who had worked with Shirley Scott as a drummer) to continue developing her repertoire.

In 1967, the Boston Globe printed a piece calling her a rising star and complimented her drawbar variation, vibrato shadings, and bass pedal work.

Trudy, and her husband, William Theodore Carney II, aka Mr. C. produced and performed at many festivals and venues together; such as The Mellon Jazz Festival Organ Jams (produced by Mr. C. and Trudy), the Mary Lou Williams Jazz Festival, San Jose Organ Festival, Cliveden Jazz Festival, West Oak Lane Jazz Festival. Together they produced the “Jazz in the Sanctuary” concerts which featured musicians such as Grover Washington, Jr., Etta James, Houston Person, Benny Golson, and Lionel Hampton.

Trudy Pitts eventually went on to play with Ben Webster, Gene Ammons, and Sonny Stitt. She recorded four albums for Prestige Records, appearing with Willis Jackson among others. In 1999, a compilation album of several records was released as Legends of Acid Jazz: Trudy Pitts With Pat Martino. Later festival appearances included the 11th Annual Mary Lou Williams Women in Jazz Festival at the Kennedy Center in Washington, D.C., in May 2006. On September 15, 2006, Pitts was the first jazz artist to play a concert on Philadelphia's Kimmel Center's 7,000 pipe organ, "taking the medium to a whole new level".

In 2008, she again performed on an exceptional organ, this time the Kennedy Center's Filene Organ.

Trudy Pitts died on December 19, 2010, aged 78, from pancreatic cancer.

== Discography ==
=== As leader ===
Singles

- 1962: Trudy Pitts & Mr. Carney: "I Really Mean It" // "Theme From Exodus" (Coral 62330)
- 1963: Trudy Pitts & Mr. Carney: "Meetin' Place" // "Swingin' Bonnie" (Coral 62347)
- 1967: "Steppin' In Minor" // "Take Five" (Prestige PR 45-448)
- 1968: "Bucket Full Of Soul" // "A Whiter Shade Of Pale" (Prestige PR 45-461)
- 1968: "Trudy 'N' Blue, Part 1" // "Trudy 'N' Blue, Part 2" (Prestige PR 45-705)

Albums

- 1967: Introducing the Fabulous Trudy Pitts (Prestige PR 7523) with Pat Martino and 'Mr. C'
- 1967: These Blues of Mine (Prestige PR 7538) with Pat Martino and 'Mr. C'
- 1968: A Bucketful of Soul (Prestige PR 7560) with Wilbert Longmire and 'Mr. C'
- 1968: The Excitement of Trudy Pitts (Recorded Live! At Club Baron) (Prestige PR 7583) with Wilbert Longmire and 'Mr. C'
- 1993: Me, Myself And I (Scorp Leo) solo piano album
- 1999: Legends Of Acid Jazz: Trudy Pitts With Pat Martino (Prestige 24208) (compilation of Introducing The Fabulous Trudy Pitts + These Blues Of Mine)
- 2007: Trudy Pitts Trio Featuring 'Mr. C' - Live At The Great American Music Hall (Doodlin' DR 005 [rel. 2009])

=== As sidewoman ===
With Pat Martino

- 1967: El Hombre (Prestige PR 7513)

With Willis Jackson

- 1968: Star Bag (Prestige PR 7571) with Bill Jennings

With Roland Kirk

- 1976: Other Folks' Music (Atlantic SD 1686)
- 1976: The Return of the 5000 Lb. Man (Warner Bros. BS 2918)
- 1977: Kirkatron (Warner Bros. BS 2982)
