= Other Folks' Music =

1976 studio album by Rahsaan Roland Kirk

Studio album by Rahsaan Roland Kirk
- Released: 1976
- Recorded: March 1976
- Genre: Jazz
- Label: Atlantic
- Producer: Joel Dorn

Rahsaan Roland Kirk chronology
The Case of the 3 Sided Dream in Audio Color (1975)	Other Folks' Music (1976)	The Return of the 5000 Lb. Man (1976)

Professional ratings
Review scores
Source	Rating
AllMusic	3/5 stars
The Penguin Guide to Jazz Recordings	3/4 stars
The Rolling Stone Jazz Record Guide	3/5 stars

Other Folks' Music is an album by the jazz multi-instrumentalist Rahsaan Roland Kirk, recorded in March 1976. It contains performances by Kirk with Richard Williams, Kermit Moore, Gloria Agostini, Trudy Pitts, Hilton Ruiz, Henry Mattathias Pearson, Roy Haynes, Sonny Brown, Arthur Jenkins and Joseph "Habao" Texidor.

== Reception ==
The AllMusic review by Thom Jurek states: "Other Folks' Music is perhaps his most dizzying and troubling recording. Meant to be both a tribute and a pointer for the next move in modern black music, Other Folks' Music is, when all is said and done, a very private altar adorned with much of Kirk's personal iconography... in all of Kirk's moods and segues, his usually indelible mark of inseparability — the trace that says that this is all one music and we are all one people — is missing here, and the listener can feel the separation between tracks, and sometimes inside the tracks themselves. The music is still topnotch, but that nagging ghost of isolation on Other Folks' Music can still haunt the listener."

== Track listing ==
1. "Water for Robeson and Williams" (Rahsaan Roland Kirk) - 3:48
2. "That's All" (Alan Brandt, Bob Haymes) - 7:39
3. "Donna Lee" (Charlie Parker) - 4:10
4. "Simone" (Frank Foster) - 9:05
5. "Anysha" (Trudy Pitts) - 8:13
6. "Samba Kwa Mwanamke Mweusi" (Henry Mattathias Pearson) - 6:53
7. "Arrival" (Hilton Ruiz) - 7:09

- Recorded at Regent Sound Studios, NYC, March, 1975

== Personnel ==
- Roland Kirk: tenor saxophone, manzello, stritch, clarinet, flute, reed trumpet, harmonica, miscellaneous instruments, arranger
- Richard Williams: trumpet
- Kermit Moore: cello
- Gloria Agostini: harp
- Trudy Pitts: piano, electric piano, arranger
- Hilton Ruiz: piano arranger
- Henry Mattathias Pearson: bass, arranger
- Roy Haynes: drums
- Sonny Brown: drums
- Arthur Jenkins, Joseph "Habao" Texidor: percussion
