= Rahn Burton =

American jazz musician

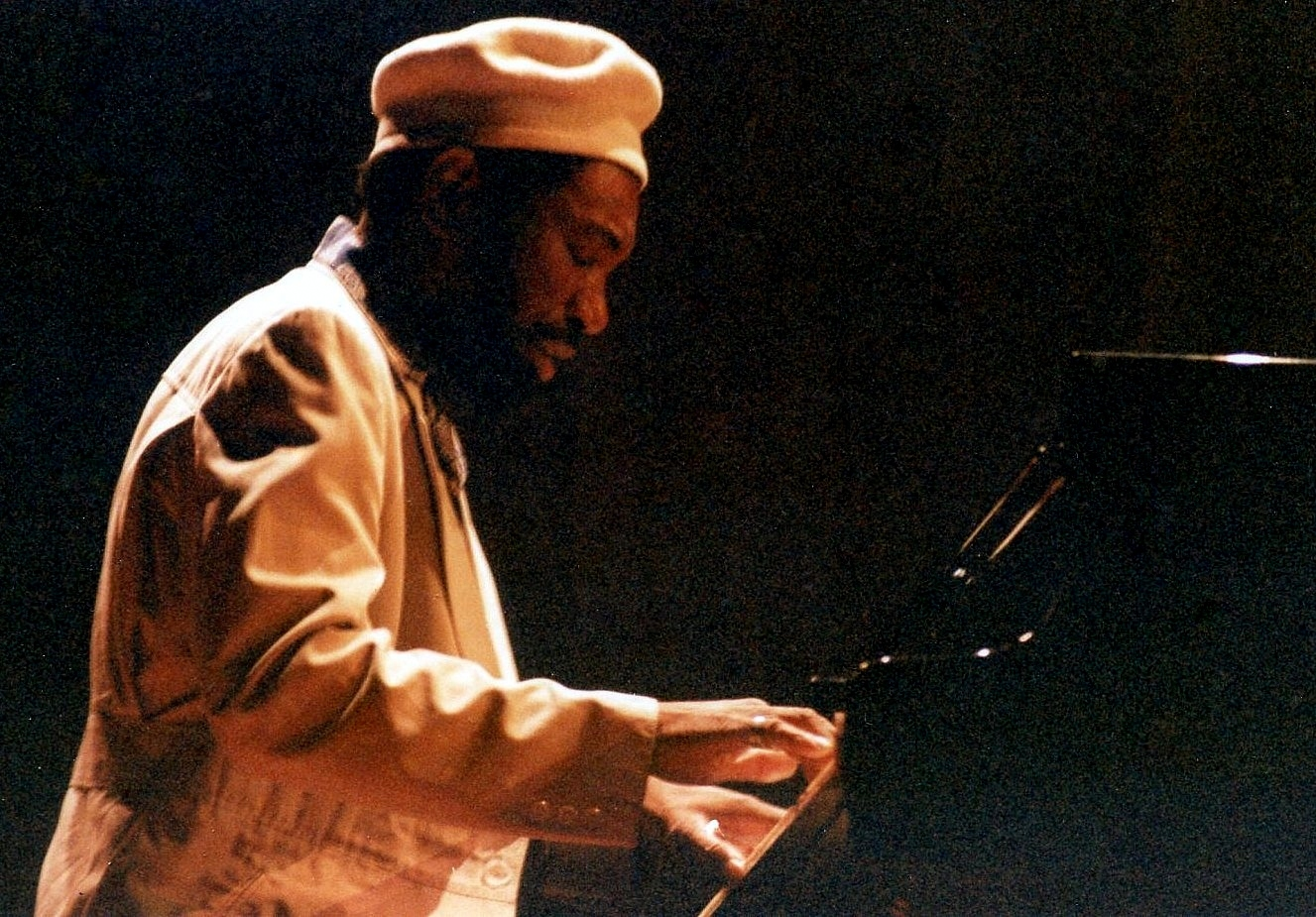

Background information
- Born: February 10, 1934; Louisville, Kentucky
- Died: January 25, 2013 (aged 78) New York
- Genres: Jazz piano
- Occupation: Jazz pianist
- Instrument: Piano
- Years active: 1960–2006

Rahn Burton, also Ron Burton or William Burton (February 10, 1934, Louisville, Kentucky - January 25, 2013) was an American jazz pianist.

== Biography ==
Burton began taking piano lessons at age 13, and worked locally in Louisville before playing his first gigs with Roland Kirk. He toured with Kirk from 1953 to 1959 and recorded with Kirk into the early 1960s, contributing the composition "Jack the Ripper" to the 1960 release Introducing Roland Kirk. He moved on to playing local gigs in New York and Syracuse for a short time in the early 1960s, then returned to local playing in Louisville again. In 1964-65 he played organ in George Adams's touring ensemble, and played briefly with Sirone around the same time.

In 1967, Burton re-joined Roland Kirk's group, playing with him at the 1968 Newport Jazz Festival and on several recordings through 1973. He also founded his own ensemble, African American Connection, which included Roland Alexander, Bob Cunningham, Ricky Ford, and Hannibal Marvin Peterson. He recorded extensively as a sideman in the 1970s and 1980s, with George Adams and Hannibal Peterson, as well as Carlos Garnett, Beaver Harris, Jemeel Moondoc, Charlie Rouse, Leon Thomas and Stanley Turrentine. His associations in the 1990s included work in Austria with Nicholas Simion, and a trio recording in 1992 with Walter Booker and Jimmy Cobb.

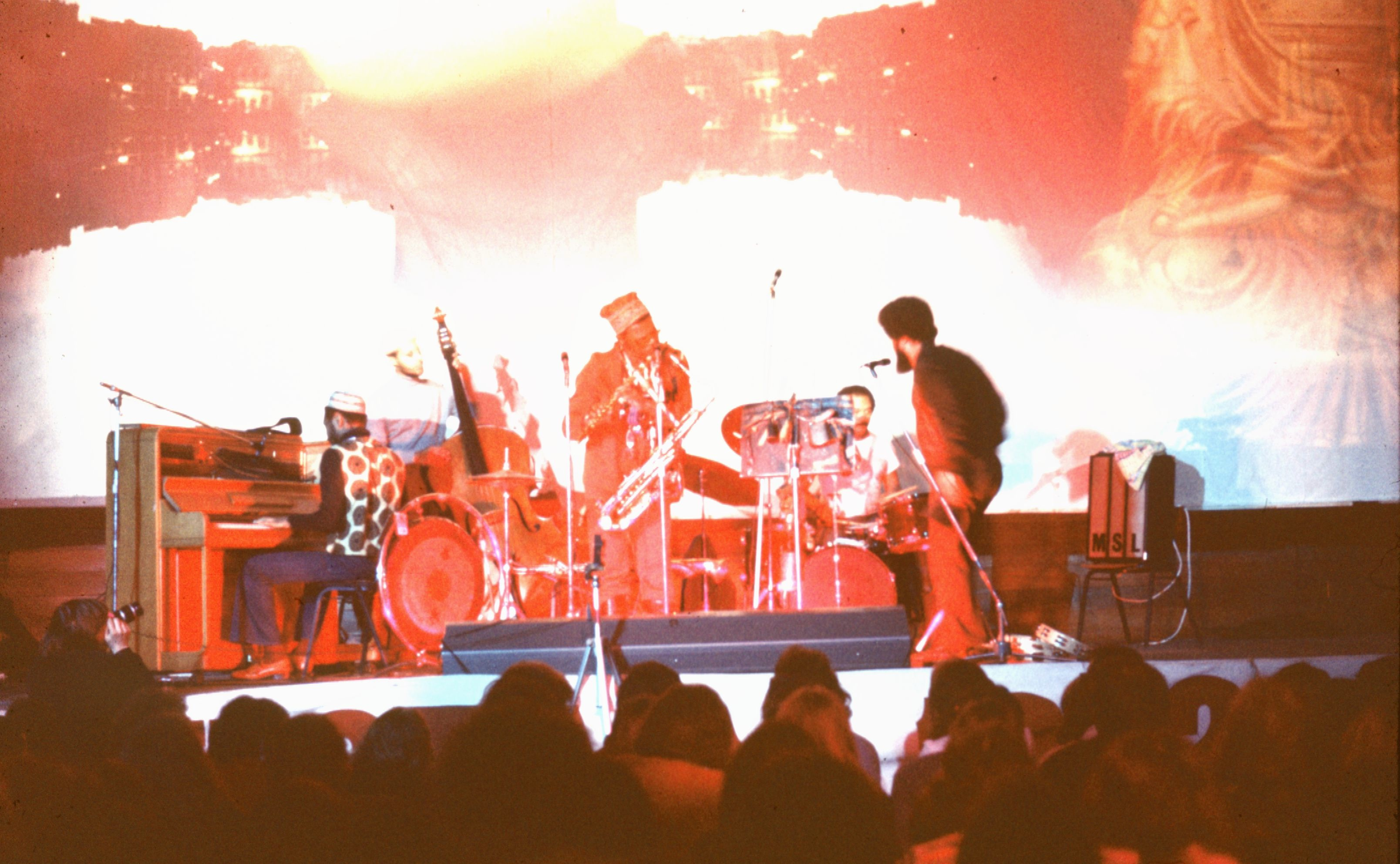
Burton (far left) on the piano performing during a 1972 Roland Kirk's concert in Coventry, UK

== Discography ==
With George Adams

- Paradise Space Shuttle (Timeless, 1979)
- More Sightings (Enja, 1984) with Marvin "Hannibal" Peterson

With Michael Carvin

- The Camel (SteepleChase, 1975)

With Ellen Christi

- Live at Irving Plaza (Soul Note, 1985)

With Dick Griffin

- The Eighth Wonder (Strata-East, 1974)

With Beaver Harris

- Beautiful Africa (Soul Note, 1979)
- Safe (Red, 1980)
- Live at Nyon (Cadence, 1981)

With Rahsaan Roland Kirk

- Introducing Roland Kirk (Argo, 1960)
- The Inflated Tear (Atlantic, 1968)
- Left & Right (Atlantic, 1968)
- Volunteered Slavery (Atlantic, 1969)
- Rahsaan Rahsaan (Atlantic, 1970)
- Brotherman in the Fatherland (Rhino, 1972 [2006])
- I, Eye, Aye: Live at the Montreux Jazz Festival, 1972 (Rhino, 1972 [1996])
- Prepare Thyself to Deal with a Miracle (Atlantic, 1973)
- Bright Moments (Atlantic, 1973)

With Jemeel Moondoc

- Nostalgia in Times Square (Soul Note, 1985)

With Massimo Urbani

- 360° Aeutopia (Red, 1979)
