= The Case of the 3 Sided Dream in Audio Color =

Studio album by Rahsaan Roland Kirk
- Released: 1975
- Recorded: May 14, 1975
- Studio: Regent Sound Studios, NYC
- Genre: Jazz
- Length: 73:44
- Label: Atlantic
- Producer: Joel Dorn

Rahsaan Roland Kirk chronology
Bright Moments (1973)	The Case of the 3 Sided Dream in Audio Color (1975)	Other Folks' Music (1976)

The Case of the 3 Sided Dream in Audio Color is a 1975 album by American jazz multi-instrumentalist Rahsaan Roland Kirk, released as a double LP, with side-4 appearing blank—although side-4 had a hidden track, the contents of which were released as track 20 on the CD re-release. It contains performances by Kirk with Pat Patrick, Hilton Ruiz, Richard Tee, Arthur Jenkins, Cornell Dupree, Keith Loving, Hugh McCracken, Francisco Centeno, Henry Pearson, Bill Salter, Sonny Brown, Steve Gadd, John Goldsmith, Lawrence Killian, Ralph MacDonald, and arrangements by William Eaton.

== Reception ==
Professional ratings
Review scores
Source	Rating
AllMusic	4/5 stars
The Penguin Guide to Jazz Recordings	2/4 stars
The Rolling Stone Jazz Record Guide	3/5 stars

The AllMusic review by Thom Jurek states, "Excess was always the name of the game for Kirk, but so was the groove, and here on this three-sided double LP, groove is at the heart of everything [...] But the groove he moves through is one that is so large, so universal, deep, and serene, that it transcends all notions of commercialism versus innovation. Bottom line, even with the charming tape-recorded ramblings of his between tunes, this was his concept and it works like a voodoo charm. Here's one for the revisionists: This record jams".

== Track listing ==
All tracks are written by Rahsaan Roland Kirk except where noted.

No.	Title	Writer(s)	Length
1.	"Conversation"		0:59
2.	"Bye Bye Blackbird"	Mort Dixon; Ray Henderson	2:43
3.	"Horses (Monogram/Republic)"		0:18
4.	"High Heel Sneakers"	Tommy Tucker	4:50
5.	"Dream, Pt. 1"		0:53
6.	"Echoes of Primitive Ohio & Chili Dogs"		6:55
7.	"The Entertainer (Done in the Style of the Blues)"	Scott Joplin; William Eaton	6:02
8.	"Freaks for the Festival, Pt. 1"		4:01
9.	"Dream, Pt. 2"		1:28
10.	"Portrait of Those Beautiful Ladies"		6:24
11.	"Dream, Pt. 3"		0:59
12.	"The Entertainer"	Eaton; Joplin	6:17
13.	"Dream, Pt. 4"		1:05
14.	"Portrait of Those Beautiful Ladies (#2)"		7:56
15.	"Dream, Pt. 5"		0:52
16.	"Freaks for the Festival, Pt. 2"		5:34
17.	"Sesroh"		0:24
18.	"Bye Bye Blackbird (Alternate Version)"	Dixon; Henderson	2:37
19.	"Conversation (Alternate Version)"		0:57
20.	"Telephone Conversation"		12:41
Total length:			73:44

Bonus track
No.	Title	Length
1.	"Three for the Festival (Live at Newport Jazz Festival, 1968)"	4:18

- Recorded at Regent Sound Studios, NYC, May 14, 1975

== Personnel ==
- Rahsaan Roland Kirk – tenor saxophone, clarinet, flute, trumpet, arranger
- Pat Patrick – baritone saxophone
- Hilton Ruiz, Richard Tee – keyboards
- Arthur Jenkins – keyboards, arranger
- Cornell Dupree, Keith Loving, Hugh McCracken – guitar
- Francisco Centeno, Henry Pearson, Bill Salter – bass
- Sonny Brown, Steve Gadd, John Goldsmith – drums
- Lawrence Killian – congas
- Ralph MacDonald – congas, percussion
- William Eaton – arranger
