= Rip Rig and Panic =

Rip Rig and Panic may refer to:

- Rip, Rig and Panic (album), a 1965 jazz album by saxophonist Roland Kirk
- Rip Rig + Panic, a post-punk band from Bristol, England
