= Freddie Moore =

American jazz musician (1900–1992)

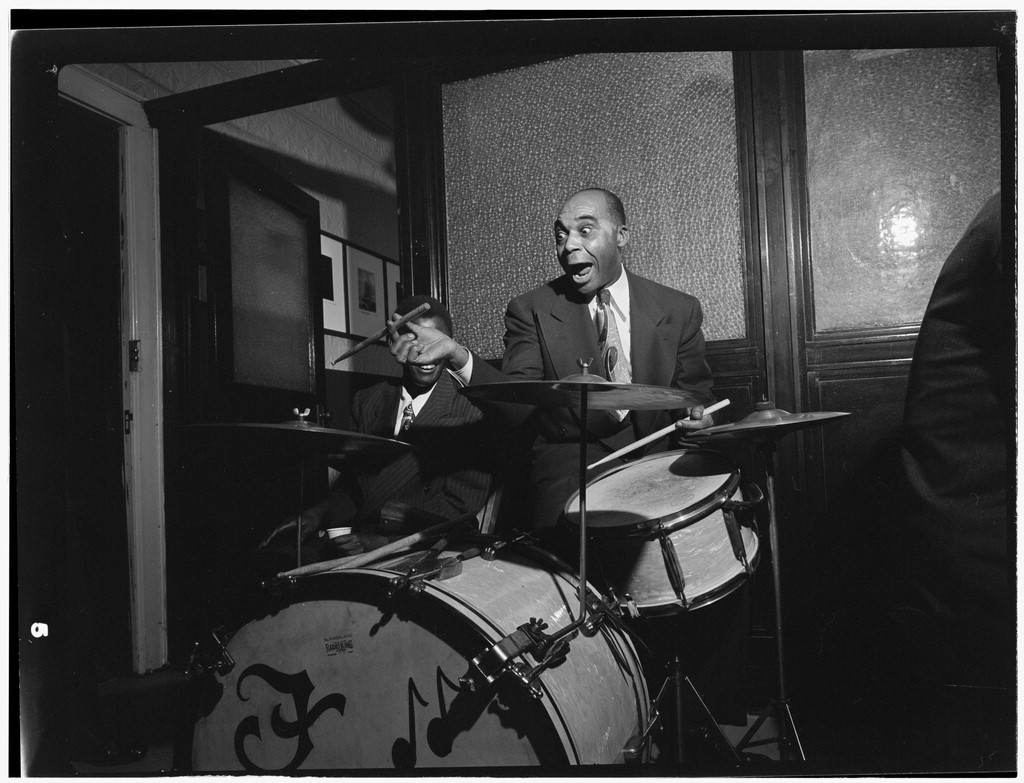
- Moore at William P. Gottlieb's office, Queens, New York, c. 1948

Background information
- Born: August 20, 1900; Little Washington, North Carolina, U.S.
- Died: November 3, 1992 (aged 92) The Bronx, New York, U.S.
- Genre: Jazz
- Occupation: Musician
- Instruments: Drums; washboard; vocals
- Years active: 1910s–1992

Freddie Moore (August 20, 1900 – November 3, 1992) was an American jazz drummer, washboarder and singer. Over the span of his 80-year career, he performed in bands with prominent jazz musicians in New York City and other cities across the United States, also touring Europe.

== Early life ==
Moore was born on August 20, 1900, in Little Washington, North Carolina. He spent his early life in New Bern, North Carolina, and in 1912, at the age of twelve, began playing drums.

== Career ==
Moore began his career as a teenager, performing in traveling shows such as carnivals, circuses, minstrel shows, and in vaudeville. For the next seven years, Moore served as the house drummer in Birmingham, Alabama, where he performed in a theater with an organist to accompany silent films and singers such as Ida Cox, Ma Rainey, and Bessie Smith. He subsequently toured the American South and performed in Havana with the show Charleston Dandies.

In the 1920s, Moore began playing with Jelly Roll Morton, and around 1927, he joined Charlie Creath in St. Louis. Afterward, he led his own seven-piece band in Detroit, performing at the Savoy under the name "Buddy Moore". Soon after moving to New York, he played in the big band of Eubie Blake, touring with the group around 1928, and next, with Wilbur Sweatman from 1928 to 1931. The next two years, 1931–2, he played the Victoria Café in New York and toured with cornetist and bandleader King Oliver in 1931–2, with whom he had also recorded with in 1929–30.

From 1933 to 1937, he led a trio with Pete Brown and Don Frye, and in May 1937, briefly played engagements with bassist John Kirby at New York's Onyx Club.

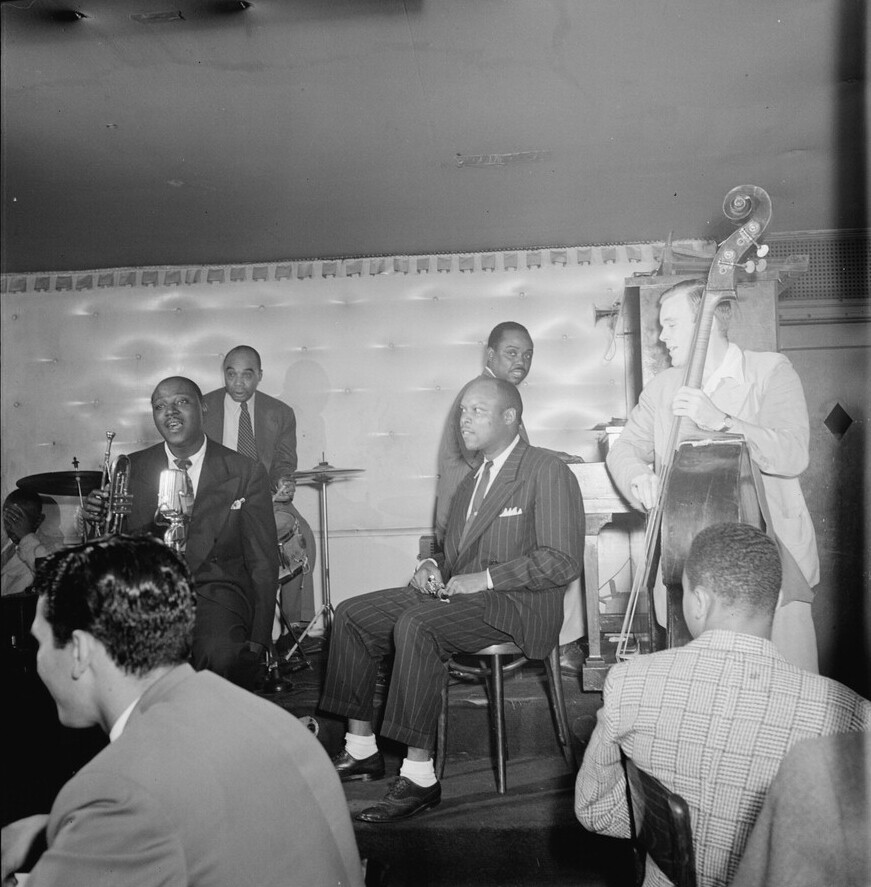
From left: Sidney De Paris, Moore, Eddie Barefield, Sammy Price, and Charlie Traegerat; Jimmy Ryan's club, New York, c. 1947

Throughout the following two decades, Moore freelanced with a crowd including Lem Johnson, Art Hodes in the mid-1940s (including in a trio with Max Kaminsky or Bill Davison at the Village Vanguard, but in 1950, at Chicago's Blue Note Club, Sidney Bechet (with Bunk Johnson in 1945, and later, in 1947), and Bob Wilber in 1948. During the early part of these years, he also was the house drummer of the Jimmy Ryan's club, though later, served as house drummer at Stuyvesant Casino for jam sessions.

The years following found Moore with trombonist Conrad Janis (1951) and the "New New Orleans Jazz Band" of Wilbur de Paris (1948, 1952–4). He toured Europe with Mezz Mezzrow in 1954–5, with the Nicholas Brothers in Paris, and from 1955, performed in the band of Sammy Price alongside Bechet.

In the 1970s, he worked with Tony Parenti (1968–70) and Roy Eldridge (Summer of 1971). In 1976, he accompanied Rahsaan Roland Kirk on his album The Return of the 5000 Lb. Man, playing washboard on a cover of "Sweet Georgia Brown". Moore celebrated his 79th birthday playing at One Fifth Avenue with the Downtown Blue Blowers.

Finally, in 1981, he recorded his first and only album as leader, The Great Freddie Moore, on the New York Jazz label (1985; J-001). Moore continued his career into the mid-1980s and 1990s, performing with various New York bands, though by now, he began to concentrate his efforts towards washboard, on account of ill health.

While physically unable to play the drums completely in his old age, he continued on the washboard and sang with Bob Cantwell's New Orleans Band at the Red Blazer Too, a Manhattan club on West 46th Street. He officially retired from performing in March 1992; he last appeared performing with Cantwell's band on his 92nd birthday.

== Playing style ==
Jazz critic Scott Yanow considered Moore "a colorful performer, often mugging and adding showbiz effects to the music".

The New York Times described his style, writing, "He played drums with a strong, steady beat, accented with sudden cannonlike shots and deliberately placed cymbal accents. For 'Tiger Rag' he sometimes blew on his snare drum to create a kittenish 'tiger roar.' Drumming with one hand while he held a microphone in the other, he sang in a leathery, rhythmic shout while he agitated his face with exaggerated grimaces."

== Personal life ==
Moore was married to Lucille Moore and had a brother, Edward Moore, who resided in their hometown of New Bern, North Carolina.

He died on November 3, 1992, aged 92, at his home in The Bronx, New York.

== Selected discography ==
As leader

- The Great Freddie Moore (New York Jazz, 1985?; J-001)

As sideman

- King Oliver and His Orchestra – 1928–1930 (1991)
- Original Art Hodes Trio, Blues 'n' Booze (Blue Note, 1945)
- Conrad Janis, Bob Wilber, Dick Smith, Tom Sharpsteen, Pops Foster, Eubie Blake, Danny Barker, John Jeffrey, Freddy Moore, Jamming at Rudi's, No. 1 (Circle),
- Baby Dodds, Baby Dodds Trio / Jazz À La Creole (GHB, 1968)
- Wilbur De Paris, Marchin' And Swingin / At Symphony Hall (Collectables, 2000)
- Wilbur De Paris and His Rampart Street Ramblers, New Orleans Jazz (Atlantic, 1952)
- Wilbur De Paris, Wilbur De Paris & Rampart Street Ramblers – From Jimmy Ryan's, 52nd St. (Storyville, 1994)
- Sidney Bechet, Jazz Classics Volume 1 (Blue Note, 1955)
- Sidney Bechet, The Genius Of Sidney Bechet. This Is Jazz Broadcasts + Bechet's Circle Seven (Jazzology, 1995)
- Sidney Bechet, 1945–1946 (Classics, 1997)
- Sidney Bechet, Runnin' Wild (Blue Note, 1998)
- Sidney Bechet, Shake 'Em Up! (Avid, 1999)
- Sidney Bechet, 1949 (Classics, 2000)
- Sidney Bechet,His American Friends Vol. 2
- Sidney Bechet, Giant of Jazz, Vol. 2 (Blue Note)
- Sidney Bechet, Sidney Bechet's Blue Note Jazz Men With "Wild Bill" Davison (Blue Note)
- Sidney Bechet, Sidney Bechet's Blue Note Jazz Men With "Wild Bill" Davison, Volume 2 (Blue Note)
- Johnny Wiggs, Raymond Burke, Art Hodes, Dr. Edmond Souchon, Freddie Moore, Summit Meeting (Jazzology, 1965)
- Rahsaan Roland Kirk, The Return of the 5000 Lb. Man (Warner Bros., 1976)
