= Billy Taylor (jazz bassist) =

American jazz bassist (1906–1986)

- Born: William Taylor; April 3, 1906; Washington, D.C., U.S.
- Died: September 2, 1986 (aged 80) Fairfax, Virginia, U.S.
- Genre: Jazz
- Occupation: Musician
- Instruments: Double bass; tuba
- Years active: 1920s–1940s
- Label: Keynote
- Formerly of: Duke Ellington; McKinney's Cotton Pickers; Fletcher Henderson

William Taylor Sr. (April 3, 1906 – September 2, 1986) was an American jazz bassist. He was born Washington, D.C., and died in Fairfax, Virginia.

Taylor started out playing the tuba but later picked up bass alongside it. After moving to New York City in 1924, he played with Elmer Snowden (1925), Willie Gant and Arthur Gibbs (1926), Charlie Johnson (1927–29, 1932–33), Duke Ellington (1928), McKinney's Cotton Pickers (1929–31), Fats Waller (1934), and Fletcher Henderson. He recorded with Jelly Roll Morton on three sessions in 1930. From 1935 to 1940, he again played with Ellington, and it is for this association that he is best remembered; he often played with a second bassist in the orchestra, at times Hayes Alvis or Jimmy Blanton. During that time, he also recorded with Cootie Williams and Johnny Hodges. In the 1940s, he played with Coleman Hawkins (1940), Red Allen (1940–41), Joe Sullivan (1942), Raymond Scott (1942–43), Cootie Williams (1944), Barney Bigard (1944–45), Benny Morton (1945), and Cozy Cole (1945). Later in the decade, he played freelance in New York before moving back to Washington, D.C., in 1949. He led his own ensemble for Keynote Records in 1944.

== Discography ==
=== As leader ===
- Billy Taylor's Big Eight (Keynote, 1944)[4 sides] – with Harry Carney and Johnny Hodges

=== As sideman ===
With Al Hibbler

- After the Lights Go Down Low (Atlantic, 1957)

With Barney Bigard and His Jazzopators

- "Caravan" (Variety VA-515-1, 1936) – with Cootie Williams, Juan Tizol, Harry Carney, Duke Ellington, and Sonny Greer
