= Introducing Roland Kirk =

Studio album by Roland Kirk
- Released: 1960
- Recorded: June 7, 1960
- Genre: Jazz
- Label: Argo

Roland Kirk chronology
Triple Threat (1956)	Introducing Roland Kirk (1960)	Kirk's Work (1961)

Professional ratings
Review scores
Source	Rating
AllMusic	4.5/5 stars
The Penguin Guide to Jazz Recordings	3/4 stars

Introducing Roland Kirk is the second album by the jazz multi-instrumentalist Roland Kirk, released on the Argo label in late 1960. It features performances by Kirk with Ira Sullivan, William Burton, Donald Garrett and Sonny Brown.

== Critical reception ==
The AllMusic review by Lindsay Planer states: "Although Kirk's performances are exceedingly reserved on this album, there is little doubt of his technical proficiencies. The three sides penned by Kirk are among the most interesting as they allow for a certain degree of openness that is essential when spotlighting his unique talents... Although some free jazz and avant-garde purists may find Introducing Roland Kirk not challenging enough, it provides a solid basis for his increasingly bombastic post-bop experiments throughout the remainder of the '60s and '70s".

== Track listing ==
All compositions by Roland Kirk except as indicated.

1. "The Call" - 8:42
2. "Soul Station" - 5:57
3. "Our Waltz" (David Rose) - 4:51
4. "Our Love Is Here To Stay" (George Gershwin, Ira Gershwin) - 4:50
5. "Spirit Girl" - 5:33
6. "Jack the Ripper" (William Burton) - 7:32

- Recorded in Chicago, IL, June 7, 1960

== Personnel ==
- Roland Kirk: tenor saxophone, manzello, whistle, stritch
- Ira Sullivan: trumpet, tenor saxophone
- William Burton: organ, piano
- Donald Garrett: bass
- Sonny Brown: drums
