= Lights Down Low =

Lights Down Low, or variants, may refer to:

- "Lights Down Low" (Bei Major song), 2012
- "Lights Down Low" (Jessie James Decker song), 2015
- "Lights Down Low" (Max song), 2016
- "Lights Down Low" (2 Pistols song), 2009
- "Lights Down Low", song from Come Out and Play

== See also ==
- "Turn the Lights Down Low", a 1965 album and single by Marty Robbins
- "Turn the Lights Down Low", a song by Sarah McLachlan from Shine On
- "Turn Your Lights Down Low", a 1977 song by Bob Marley and the Wailers
- "After the Lights Go Down Low", a song popularized by Al Hibbler
- After the Lights Go Down Low (album), Al Hibbler 1957
- After the Lights Go Down Low and Much More!!!, an album by Freda Payne 1964
