= Slightly Latin =

Studio album by Roland Kirk
- Released: March 1966
- Recorded: November 16–17, 1965
- Genre: Jazz
- Label: Mercury
- Producer: Hal Mooney

Roland Kirk chronology
Here Comes the Whistleman (1965)	Slightly Latin (1966)	Now Please Don't You Cry, Beautiful Edith (1967)

Professional ratings
Review scores
Source	Rating
AllMusic	4/5 stars
The Encyclopedia of Popular Music	3/5 stars

Slightly Latin is an album by the jazz multi-instrumentalist Roland Kirk, released on the Limelight label in 1966. It includes performances by Kirk with Virgil Jones, Martin Banks, Garnett Brown, Horace Parlan, Eddie Mathias, Sonny Brown, Montego Joe, Manuel Ramos, Coleridge Perkinson and an unidentified choir.

== Track listing ==
All compositions by Roland Kirk except as indicated.

1. "Walk On By" (Burt Bacharach, Hal David) - 2:32
2. "Raouf" - 3:03
3. "It's All in the Game" (Charles Dawes, Carl Sigman) - 5:14
4. "Juarez" - 5:22
5. "Shaky Money" - 2:36
6. "Nothing But the Truth" - 3:33
7. "Safari" (Eddie Mathias) - 4:26
8. "And I Love Her" (John Lennon, Paul McCartney) - 2:53
9. "Ebrauqs" - 8:16

- Recorded in New York City on November 16 & 17, 1965

== Personnel ==
- Roland Kirk: tenor saxophone, manzello, stritch, clarinet, flute, bagpipes, piccolo, baritone saxophone, siren
- Virgil Jones: trumpet
- Martin Banks: flugelhorn
- Garnett Brown: trombone, arranger
- Horace Parlan: piano, celeste, vibraphone
- Eddie Mathias: double bass
- Sonny Brown: drums, nagoya harp
- Montego Joe: conga
- Manuel Ramos: percussion
- Coleridge Perkinson: conductor (tracks 2, 4 & 6)
- Unidentified choir (tracks 2, 4 & 6)
