= Easy Living (song) =

1930s jazz standard by Ralph Rainger

Song by Ralph Rainger and Leo Robin
- Published: 1937
- Genre: Jazz • swing
- Composer: Ralph Rainger
- Lyricist: Leo Robin

"Easy Living" is a jazz standard written by Ralph Rainger with lyrics by Leo Robin for the 1937 film Easy Living.

A popular recording of the song was released in 1937 by Teddy Wilson for Brunswick Records, featuring Billie Holiday, Benny Goodman, and Lester Young.

== Composition ==
"Easy Living" was written in 4/4 time in the key of F major. It follows a 32-bar AABA form.

== Other recordings ==
As a jazz standard, "Easy Living" has been re-recorded many times. Notable releases include:

- Clifford Brown – Memorial Album (1953)
- Bill Evans – New Jazz Conceptions (1956)
- Rahsaan Roland Kirk – Third Dimension (1956)
- Paul Desmond (with Jim Hall) – Easy Living (1964)
- Lou Bennett with René Thomas – Pentacostal Feeling (1966)
- Nancy Wilson – But Beautiful (1969)
- Sarah Vaughan (with Oscar Peterson) – How Long Has This Been Going On? (1978)
- Frank Morgan (with Cedar Walton) – Easy Living (1985)
- Ann Hampton Callaway (with Wynton Marsalis) – Easy Living (1999)

== See also ==
- List of 1930s jazz standards

== Bibliography ==
- Gioia, Ted (2012). "Easy Living". The Jazz Standards: A Guide to the Repertoire. New York City: Oxford University Press. p. 94-95. ISBN 978-0-19-993739-4.
- "Easy Living". The Real Book (Lead sheet). Vol. 1 (6th ed.). Milwaukee, Wisconsin: Hal Leonard. 2006. p. 127. ISBN 978-0-634-06038-0.
- Wilson, John S. (April 30, 1987). "Cabaret: Rainger Revue". The New York Times. p. C14. ISSN 0362-4331. "[...] a couple of movie songs now remembered for Billie Holiday's recordings, 'Easy Living,' and 'I Wished on the Moon'; ..."
- Whitburn, Joel (1986). Joel Whitburn's Pop Memories 1890-1954. Menomonee Falls, Wisconsin: Record Research Inc. ISBN 0-89820-083-0. LCCN 86225626.
