= We Free Kings =

Studio album by Roland Kirk
- Released: January 1962
- Recorded: August 16–17, 1961
- Genre: Jazz
- Length: 38:40
- Label: Mercury

Roland Kirk chronology
Kirk's Work (1961)	We Free Kings (1962)	Domino (1962)

Professional ratings
Review scores
Source	Rating
AllMusic	4/5 stars
DownBeat	4.5/5 stars
The Encyclopedia of Popular Music	4/5 stars
New Record Mirror	4/5 stars
The Penguin Guide to Jazz Recordings	3.5/4 stars
The Rolling Stone Jazz Record Guide	3/5 stars

We Free Kings is a studio album by the jazz multi-instrumentalist Roland Kirk, released on Mercury Records in January 1962. His group works through a set of bluesy post-bop numbers, including a highly regarded version of Charlie Parker's "Blues for Alice". The title track, a Kirk composition, is a variation on the Christmas carol "We Three Kings".

== Reception ==
The AllMusic review by Lindsay Planer calls the album "among the most consistent of his early efforts. The assembled quartet provides an ample balance of bop and soul complements to Kirk's decidedly individual polyphonic performance style. His inimitable writing and arranging techniques develop into some great originals, as well as personalize the chosen cover tunes. With a nod to the contemporary performance style of John Coltrane, as well as a measure of his influences — most notably Clifford Brown and Sidney Bechet — Kirk maneuvers into and out of some inspiring situations".

== Track listing ==
All compositions by Roland Kirk except where noted.

1. "Three for the Festival" – 3:10
2. "Moon Song" (Sam Coslow, Arthur Johnston) – 4:23
3. "A Sack Full of Soul" – 4:40
4. "The Haunted Melody" – 3:38
5. "Blues for Alice" (Charlie Parker) – 4:08
6. "We Free Kings" – 4:46
7. "You Did It, You Did It" – 2:29
8. "Some Kind of Love" – 6:11
9. "My Delight" – 4:28

- Recorded in New York on August 16, 1961.

CD editions of the album include a different version of "Blues for Alice" (Parker) – 5:11.

== Personnel ==
- Roland Kirk: tenor saxophone, manzello, flute, stritch saxophone
- Richard Wyands: piano (tracks 3–5 & 9)
- Art Davis: double bass (tracks 3–5 & 9)
- Charlie Persip: drums
- Hank Jones: piano (tracks 1–2 & 6–8)
- Wendell Marshall: bass (tracks 1–2 & 6–8)
