= These Blues of Mine =

Studio album by Trudy Pitts
- Released: 1967
- Recorded: September 21 & 25, 1967
- Studio: Van Gelder Studio, Englewood Cliffs, New Jersey
- Genre: Jazz
- Length: 39:11
- Label: Prestige; PR 7538
- Producer: Cal Lampley

Trudy Pitts chronology
Introducing the Fabulous Trudy Pitts (1967)	These Blues of Mine (1967)	A Bucketful of Soul (1968)

These Blues of Mine is the second album by jazz organist Trudy Pitts, recorded in 1967 and released on the Prestige label.

== Reception ==
Professional ratings
Review scores
Source	Rating
Allmusic	3/5 stars

Allmusic awarded the album 3 stars, stating "Better than expected soul-jazz interpretations of contemporary rock and pop songs stand alongside jazz originals... It works best when they cut to straight, burning soul-jazz groovers".

== Track listing ==
All compositions by Bill Carney except as noted

1. "Organology" – 4:00
2. "The House of the Rising Sun" (Traditional) – 3:39
3. "Just Us Two" – 5:05
4. "Eleanor Rigby" (John Lennon, Paul McCartney) – 2:51
5. "Count Nine" (Trudy Pitts) – 4:15
6. "Man and a Woman" (Chuck Calhoun) – 4:20
7. "A Whiter Shade of Pale" (Gary Brooker, Keith Reid, Matthew Fisher) – 3:10
8. "Teddy Makes Three" – 3:03
9. "These Blues of Mine" (Bill Carney, Sonny Truitt) – 5:25
10. "What the World Needs Now" (Burt Bacharach, Hal David) – 3:23

== Personnel ==
- Trudy Pitts – organ, vocals
- Pat Martino – guitar
- Bill Carney – drums
