= Kirk's Work =

Studio album by Roland Kirk
- Released: 1961
- Recorded: July 11, 1961
- Studio: Van Gelder Studio, Englewood Cliffs, NJ
- Genre: Jazz
- Length: 33:02
- Label: Prestige
- Producer: Esmond Edwards (supervision)

Roland Kirk chronology
Introducing Roland Kirk (1960)	Kirk's Work (1961)	We Free Kings (1962)

Kirk's Work (also reissued as Funk Underneath) is an album by Roland Kirk, with Jack McDuff. Prestige Records released the album in 1961, with Original Jazz Classics and Concord Music Group issuing subsequent re-releases.

Rudy Van Gelder engineered the recording on July 11, 1961 at Van Gelder Studio (in Englewood Cliffs, New Jersey), while Esmond Edwards supervised the session. Van Gelder remastered the recording for the Concord 2007 re-release.

== Critical reception ==
Professional ratings
Review scores
Source	Rating
The Encyclopedia of Popular Music	4/5 stars
The Penguin Guide to Jazz Recordings	3/3 stars 1/1 star
The Rolling Stone Jazz Record Guide	4/5 stars

The Penguin Guide to Jazz Recordings describes Kirk's Work as "a largely forgotten Kirk album, but one which generally deserves the classic reissue billing." Ron Wynn has described the album as "a fine reissue of Kirk in a soul-jazz and mainstream vein." AllMusic notes a "swinging R&B vibe pervasive throughout the album," judging that "while certainly not the best in his catalog, it is a touchstone album that captures the early soulful Rahsaan Roland Kirk."

== Track listing ==
All music is composed by Roland Kirk, except where noted.

No.	Title	Writer(s)	Length
1.	"Three for Dizzy"		5:11
2.	"Makin' Whoopee"	Donaldson–Kahn	5:07
3.	"Funk Underneath"		6:15
4.	"Kirk's Work"		3:54
5.	"Doin' the Sixty-Eight"		4:20
6.	"Too Late Now"	Lerner–Lane	3:52
7.	"Skater's Waltz"	Charles Emile Waldteufel (arr. Kirk)	4:23

== Personnel ==
- Roland Kirk – tenor saxophone, manzello, stritch [sic], flute, siren
- Jack McDuff – Hammond organ
- Joe Benjamin – bass
- Arthur Taylor – drums
