= Ellen Christi =

American jazz musician (born 1958)

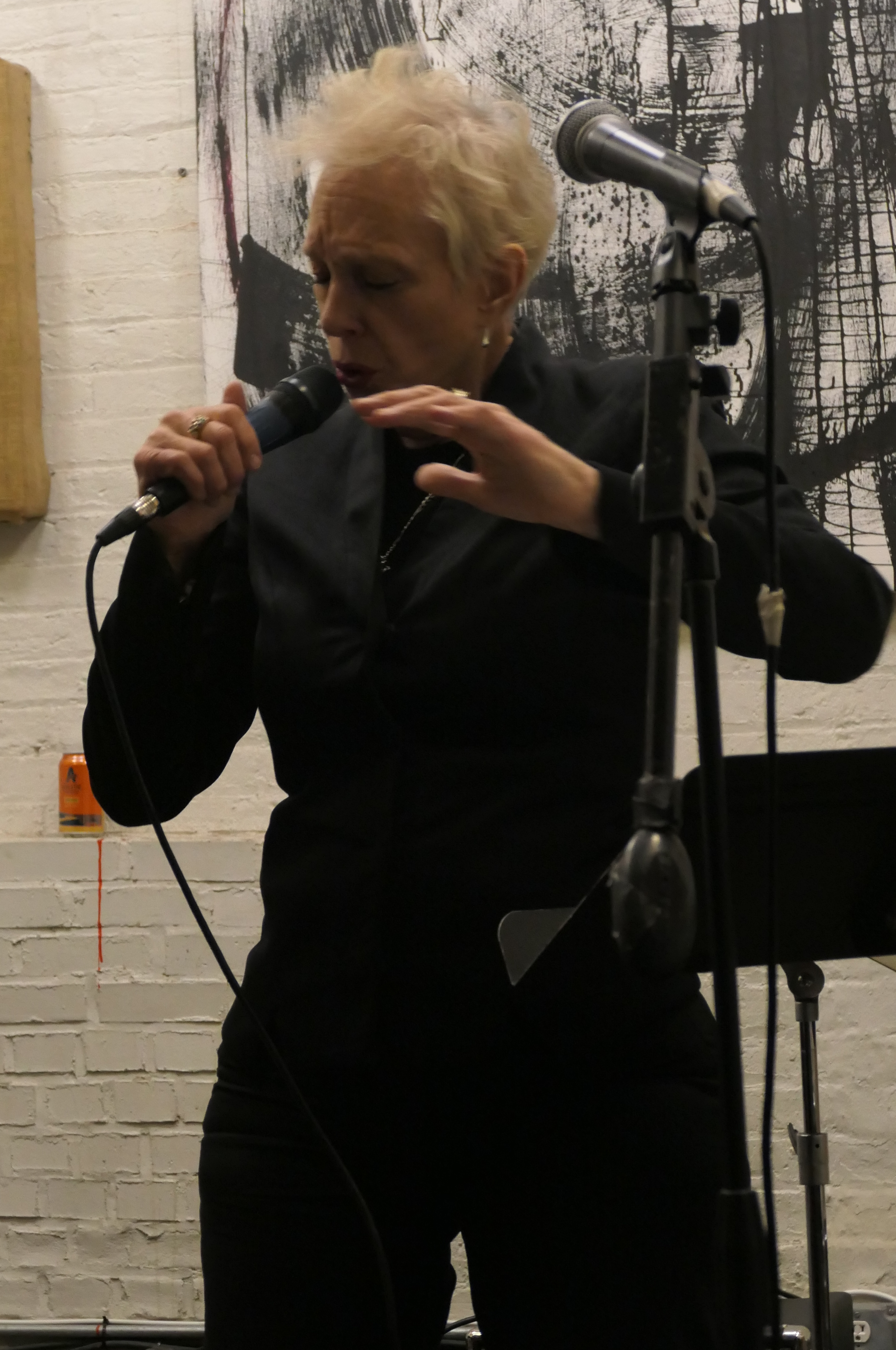
Ellen Christi at Ibeam in Brooklyn in 2025

Ellen Christi (born March 7, 1958, Chicago) is an American jazz singer.

Christi studied music formally in New York City with Jaki Byard, Jeanne Lee, and Metropolitan Opera coloratura singer Galli Campi. She was a founding member of the New York City Artists' Collective in 1975. Working primarily in New York in the 1980s, she played with Jemeel Moondoc, Rahn Burton, Tom Bruno, William Parker, and Lisa Sokolov. In the late 1980s and 1990s she began working increasingly in Europe, with Hans Koch, Carlo Actis Dato, Enrico Fazio, Guido Mazzon, and Claudio Lodati.

== Discography ==
- The Sounds of Life (N.Y.C.A.C., 1976)
- And You Ain't Ready For This One Either (N.Y.C.A.C., 1979)
- New York City Artists' Collective Plays Butch Morris (N.Y.C.A.C., 1984)
- Live at Irving Plaza (Soul Note, 1985)
- Star of Destiny (N.Y.C.A.C., 1987)
- Senza Parole (Splasc(h), 1990)
- Dreamers with Claudio Lodati (Splasc(h), 1990)
- A Piece of the Rock (Splasc(h), 1992)
- Better World (Unit, 1992)
- Vocal Desires with Claudio Lodati (C.M.C., 1994)
- Instant Reality (Network, 1995)
- Reconstruction of Sound (Network, 1996)
- Alienstalk (Sargasso, 1998)
- Tribute to Paradise with Gary Hassay (Drimala, 2004)
