= The Return of the 5000 Lb. Man =

Studio album by Rahsaan Roland Kirk
- Released: 1976
- Recorded: 1975
- Studio: Regent Sound Studios, NYC
- Genre: Jazz
- Label: Warner Bros.
- Producer: Joel Dorn

Rahsaan Roland Kirk chronology
| Other Folks' Music (1976) | The Return of the 5000 Lb. Man (1976) | Kirkatron (1977) |

The Return of the 5000 Lb. Man is a studio album by jazz multi-instrumentalist Rahsaan Roland Kirk.

== Reception ==
Professional ratings
Review scores
| Source | Rating |
|---|---|
| AllMusic | 5/5 stars |
| The Penguin Guide to Jazz Recordings | 3/4 stars |
| The Rolling Stone Jazz Record Guide | 3/5 stars |

The AllMusic review by Thom Jurek stated, "Kirk is at full creative and musical strength. These seven tracks are an utter astonishment. Kirk's playing of saxophones, harmonica, flutes, and euphonium is deep, soulful, and even profound in places ... This is one that's utterly necessary for fans, and a very fitting intro for the novice."

Michael Shera of Jazz Journal thought most of the album was "totally irrelevant" but argued that on tracks "Loving You" and "I'll Be Seeing You", Kirk showed himself as a "gifted flautist and saxophonist with considerable inventive powers".

== Track listing ==
1. "Theme for the Eulipions" (Rahsaan Roland Kirk, Betty Neals) – 9:30
2. "Sweet Georgia Brown" (Ben Bernie, Kenneth Casey, Maceo Pinkard) – 4:47
3. "I'll Be Seeing You" (Sammy Fain, Irving Kahal) – 6:09
4. "Loving You" (Minnie Riperton, Richard Rudolph) – 4:49
5. "Goodbye Pork Pie Hat" (Charles Mingus, Kirk) – 6:22
6. "There Will Never Be Another You" (Mack Gordon, Harry Warren) – 5:09
7. "Giant Steps" (John Coltrane) – 6:12

- Recorded at Regent Sound Studios, New York City, 1975

== Personnel ==
- Roland Kirk – tenor saxophone, manzello, stritch, clarinet, flute, harmonica, euphonium
- Betty Neals – recitation (1)
- Maeretha Stewart – vocals (1)
- Romeo Penque – baritone saxophone, oboe (1, 6, 7)
- Howard Johnson – tuba (1, 6, 7)
- William Butler – guitar (3–5)
- Hilton Ruiz – piano, celesta (1, 4–7)
- Hank Jones – piano (2)
- Trudy Pitts – organ (3)
- Arthur Jenkins – keyboards (4, 5)
- Buster Williams (1, 6, 7), Milt Hinton (2), Matathias Pearson (4, 5) – bass
- Charlie Persip (1, 6, 7), Bill Carney (3–5), Jerry Griffin (4, 5) – drums
- Joe Habao Texidor – percussion, vocals (1, 4–7)
- Warren Smith – percussion (4, 5)
- Freddie Moore – washboard (2)
- Wilton Eaton – whistling (2)
- Uncredited chorus (6, 7)
