= Triple Threat (Roland Kirk album) =

Studio album by Roland Kirk
- Released: July 1957
- Recorded: November 9, 1956
- Genre: Jazz
- Length: 38:40
- Label: King

Roland Kirk chronology
Triple Threat (1957)	Introducing Roland Kirk (1960)

Third Dimension Cover

Professional ratings
Review scores
Source	Rating
AllMusic	3/5 stars
The Encyclopedia of Popular Music	3/5 stars

Triple Threat is the debut album by the jazz multi-instrumentalist Roland Kirk. It was released through King Records in July 1957. It features performances by Kirk with James Madison, Carl Pruitt and Henry Duncan. The album features the first recorded examples of Kirk's trademark playing of multiple wind instruments at the same time as well as two tracks ("Stormy Weather" and "The Nearness of You") where he overdubbed manzello and tenor saxophone. Kirk would later state that the album "was about the third overdub record in black classical music". It was later re-released on the Bethlehem label as Third Dimension and on the Affinity label as Early Roots. The original release of the record received limited distribution and only became widely known after it was rereleased a few years prior to Kirk's death.

== Track listing ==
All compositions by Roland Kirk except where noted.

1. "Roland's Theme" - 2:51
2. "Slow Groove" - 6:52
3. "Stormy Weather" (Harold Arlen, Ted Koehler) - 4:38
4. "The Nearness of You" (Hoagy Carmichael, Ned Washington) - 5:34
5. "A La Carte" - 2:22
6. "Easy Living" (Ralph Rainger, Leo Robin) - 4:40
7. "Triple Threat" - 2:29

- Recorded in New York City on November 9, 1956

== Personnel ==
- Roland Kirk - tenor saxophone, manzello, flute, stritch
- James Madison - piano
- Carl Pruitt - bass
- Henry Duncan - drums
