= Introducing the Fabulous Trudy Pitts =

Studio album by Trudy Pitts
- Released: 1967
- Recorded: February 15 & 21, 1967
- Studio: Van Gelder Studio, Englewood Cliffs, New Jersey
- Genre: Jazz
- Length: 41:07
- Label: Prestige; PR 7523
- Producer: Cal Lampley

Trudy Pitts chronology
Introducing the Fabulous Trudy Pitts (1967)	These Blues of Mine (1967)

Introducing the Fabulous Trudy Pitts is the debut album by jazz organist Trudy Pitts which was recorded in 1967 and released on the Prestige label.

== Reception ==
Professional ratings
Review scores
Source	Rating
Allmusic	3/5 stars

Allmusic awarded the album 3 stars stating "A strong debut from Trudy Pitts, divided between covers of pretty mainstream standards and gutsier straight soul-jazz".

== Track listing ==
All compositions by Bill Carney except as noted

1. "Steppin' in Minor" – 4:30
2. "The Spanish Flea" (Julius Wechter) – 4:20
3. "Music to Watch Girls By" (Sid Ramin) – 4:35
4. "Something Wonderful" (Richard Rodgers, Oscar Hammerstein II) – 3:25
5. "Take Five" (Paul Desmond) – 4:28
6. "It Was a Very Good Year" (Ervin Drake) – 3:45
7. "Siete" – 4:00
8. "Night Song" (Charles Strouse, Lee Adams) – 3:56
9. "Fiddlin'" – 3:55
10. "Matchmaker, Matchmaker" (Jerry Bock, Sheldon Harnick) – 4:13

== Personnel ==
- Trudy Pitts – Hammond B3 organ, vocals
- Pat Martino – guitar
- Bill Carney – drums
- Carmell Johnson – congas
