= Al Hibbler =

American pop and R&B singer (1915–2001)

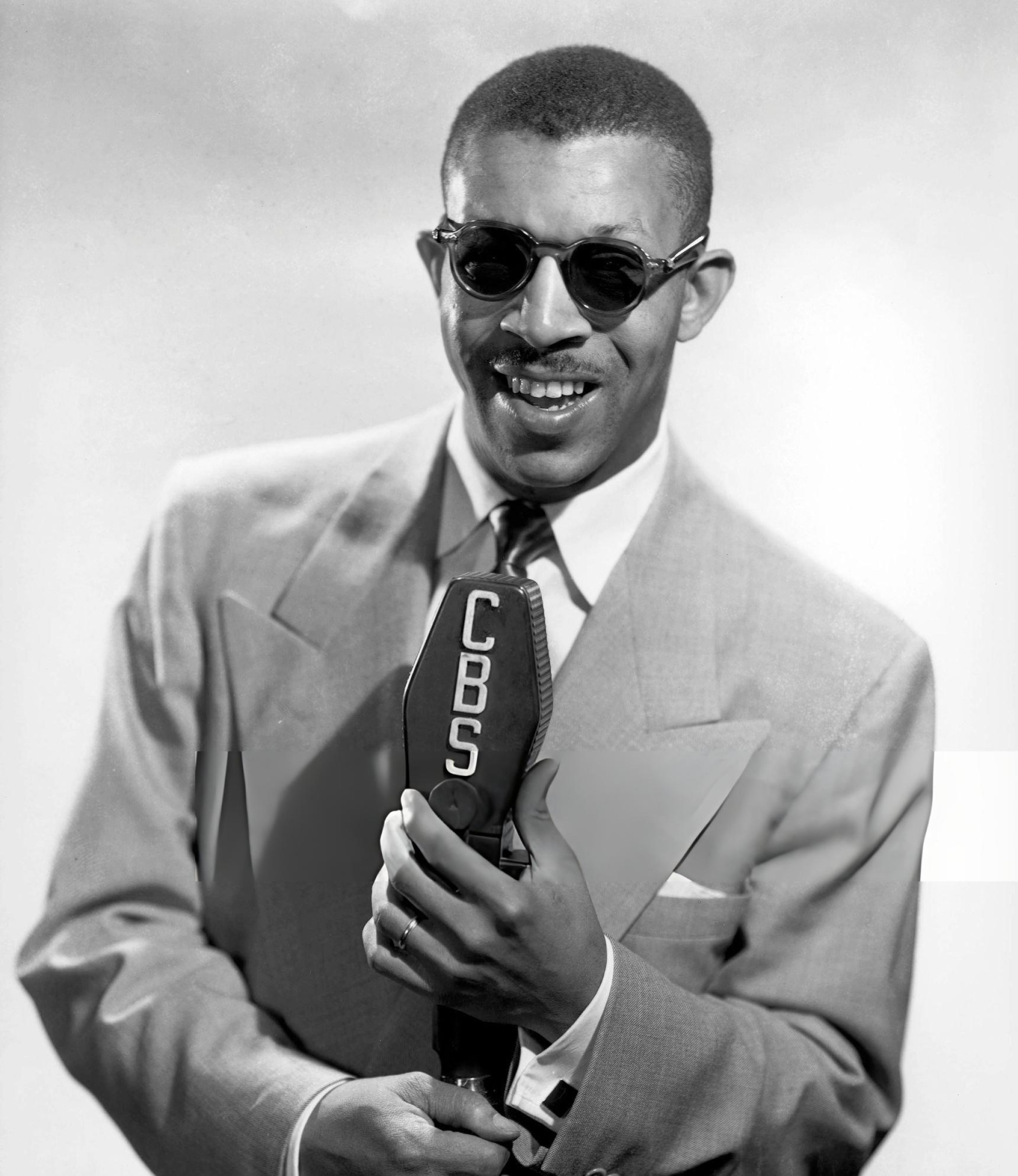
- Hibbler, c. 1954

Background information
- Born: Albert (or Andrew) George Hibbler; August 16, 1915; Tyro, Mississippi, U.S.
- Died: April 24, 2001 (aged 85) Chicago, Illinois, U.S.
- Genres: Traditional pop; R&B; jazz; easy listening
- Occupation: Singer
- Years active: 1935–2001
- Labels: Aladdin; Miracle; Atlantic; Argo; Chess; Mercury; Clef; Norgran; Original; Decca; Top Rank; Reprise; Satin; Vegas; Verve; Score; Sunset; Holiday; Pickwick
- Formerly of: Dub Jenkins and his Playmates; Jay McShann; Duke Ellington; Johnny Hodges; Count Basie
- Spouse: Jeanette McAden (m. 1949; sep. 1966)

Albert George Hibbler (August 16, 1915 – April 24, 2001) was an American baritone vocalist who sang with Duke Ellington's orchestra before having several pop hits as a solo artist. Some of Hibbler's singing is classified as rhythm and blues (R&B), but he is best seen as a bridge between R&B and traditional pop music. According to one authority, "Hibbler cannot be regarded as a jazz singer but as an exceptionally good interpreter of twentieth-century popular songs who happened to work with some of the best jazz musicians of the time."

== Early life ==
Hibbler was born in Tyro, Mississippi, to Hubert Hibbler Sr. and Lucy Propst, and was blind from birth. Some sources give his birth name as Andrew George Hibbler. At the age of 12, he moved to Little Rock, Arkansas, where he attended the Arkansas School for the Blind, joining the school choir. Later, he began working as a blues singer in local bands, failing his first audition for Duke Ellington in 1935. However, after repeatedly winning an amateur talent contest at the Palace Theatre in Memphis, Tennessee, he was given his start with Dub Jenkins and his Playmates. Jenkins was a popular Memphis saxophonist and bandleader. He later joined a band led by Jay McShann in 1942, and the following year joined Ellington's orchestra, replacing Herb Jeffries.

== Career ==
In 1957, Topps issued a series of movie, television, and recording stars which included Hibbler.

Hibbler stayed with Ellington for almost eight years and featured on a range of Ellington standards, including "Do Nothining till You Hear from Me", the words for which were written specifically for him and which reached No. 6 on the Billboard pop chart (and No. 1 for eight weeks on the Harlem Hit Parade chart) in 1944, "I Ain't Got Nothin' But the Blues", and "I'm Just a Lucky So-and-So". Although Hibbler's style was described as "mannered", "over-stated", "full of idiosyncrasies", and "bizarre vocal pyrotechnics", he was also considered "undoubtedly the best" of Ellington's male vocalists. While with Ellington, Hibbler was named a "New Star" by Esquire in 1947 and won the DownBeat award for Best Male Band Vocalist in 1949.

Hibbler left Ellington's band in 1951 after a dispute over his wages. He then recorded with various bands, including those of Johnny Hodges and Count Basie, and for various labels, including Mercury and Norgran, a subsidiary of Verve Records, for whom he released an LP, Al Hibbler Favorites, in 1953. In 1954, he released a more successful album, Al Hibbler Sings Duke Ellington, and in 1955, he began recording with Decca Records, with immediate success. His biggest hit was "Unchained Melody", which reached No. 3 on the U.S. pop chart, sold over one million copies and was awarded a gold disc. Hibbler's version also reached No. 2 on the UK singles chart, becoming his only chart hit in the United Kingdom. Its success led to network appearances, including a live jazz club remote on NBC Radio's Monitor. Other hits were "He" (1955), "11th Hour Melody", and "Never Turn Back" (both in 1956). "After the Lights Go Down Low" (also in 1956) was his last top-ten hit.

=== Activism and later years ===
A news clipping of Hibbler's 1963 arrest

In the late 1950s and 1960s, Hibbler became a civil rights activist, marching with protestors and getting arrested in 1959 in New Jersey and in 1963 in Alabama. The notoriety of this activism discouraged major record labels from carrying his work, but Frank Sinatra supported him and signed him to a contract with his label, Reprise Records. However, Hibbler made very few recordings after that, occasionally making live appearances through the 1990s. In 1971, Hibbler sang two songs at Louis Armstrong's funeral. In 1972, he made the album A Meeting of the Times with another fiercely-independent blind musician, the multi-instrumentalist Rahsaan Roland Kirk.

== Personal life and death ==
Hibbler married Jeanette McAden on January 23, 1949; they separated around 1966, and Hibbler had no children. He died at Holy Cross Hospital in Chicago in on April 24, 2001, at the age of 85. He is buried at Lincoln Cemetery in Blue Island, Illinois.

== Awards and honors ==
Sources:

- "New Star", Esquire (1947)
- Best Male Band Vocalist, DownBeat (1948, 1949)
- Pioneer Award, Rhythm and Blues Foundation (1991)
- Lifetime Achievement Award, Arkansas Jazz Heritage Foundation (1995)

== Discography ==
=== Solo singles ===
Year	Titles (A-side, B-side) Both sides from same album except where indicated	Label & number	Chart positions			Album
Year	Titles (A-side, B-side) Both sides from same album except where indicated	Label & number	U.S. Pop	U.S. R&B	UK	Album
1946	"I Got It Bad (and That Ain't Good)" b/w "How Long Blues"	Aladdin 154	—	—	—	I Surrender Dear
1947	"S'posin'" b/w "Don't Take Your Love from Me"	Aladdin 155A/156A	—	—	—	I Surrender Dear
1947	"I Surrender Dear" b/w "Fat and Forty"	Aladdin 155B/156B	—	—	—	I Surrender Dear
1948	"Trees" /	Miracle 501	—	2	—	Melodies by Al Hibbler
1948	"Lover, Come Back To Me"	Miracle 501	—	9	—	Melodies by Al Hibbler
1950	"Danny Boy" b/w "Song of the Wanderer" (from After the Lights Go Down Low)	Atlantic 911	—	9	—	Non-album track
1951	"The Blues Come Falling Down" b/w "Old Folks" (non-album track)	Atlantic 925	—	—	—	After the Lights Go Down Low
1951	"Travelin' Light" b/w "If I Knew You Were There"	Atlantic 932	—	—	—	After the Lights Go Down Low
1951	"Now I Lay Me Down to Dream" b/w "This Is Always"	Atlantic 945	—	—	—	After the Lights Go Down Low
1951	"What Will I Tell My Heart" b/w "It Don't Mean a Thing"	Chess 1455	—	9	—	Melodies by Al Hibbler
1951	"Trees" b/w "Lover Come Back to Me"	Chess 1456	—	—	—	Melodies by Al Hibbler
1951	"Solitude" b/w "Feather Roll Blues"	Chess 1457	—	—	—	Melodies by Al Hibbler
1951	"My Little Brown Book" b/w "I Love You"	Chess 1481	—	—	—	Melodies by Al Hibbler
1952	"Please" b/w "Believe It Beloved"	Mercury 89011	—	—	—	Al Hibbler Sings Love Songs
1953	"Sent for You Yesterday and Here You Come Today" b/w "Goin' to Chicago"	Mercury 89028	—	—	—	Basie Jazz
1953	"There Is No Greater Love" b/w "It Must Be True"	Mercury 89046	—	—	—	Al Hibbler Sings Love Songs
1954	"As Time Goes By" b/w "I'm Getting Sentimental over You"	Clef 89095	—	—	—	Al Hibbler Sings Love Songs
1954	"Poor Butterfly" b/w "Fat and Forty"	Chess 1569	—	—	—	Melodies By Al Hibbler
1954	"Little Brown Book" b/w "I'm Just a Lucky So-and-So"	Norgran 114	—	—	—	Al Hibbler Sings Love Songs
1955	"After the Lights Go Down Low" (Original version) b/w "Tell Me"	Original 1006	—	—	—	After the Lights Go Down Low
1955	"Autumn Winds" b/w "You Will Be Mine"	Original 1008	—	—	—	After the Lights Go Down Low
1955	"Unchained Melody" b/w "Daybreak"	Decca 29441 (U.S.); Brunswick 05420 (UK)	3	1	2 (Note: "Unchained Melody" reached No. 1 in the rival Record Mirror singles chart.)	Hits by Hibbler
1955	"They Say You're Laughing at Me" b/w "I Can't Put My Arms Around a Memory" (non-album track)	Decca 29543	—	—	—	Hits by Hibbler
1955	"Danny Boy" b/w "Now I Lay Me Down to Dream" (from After the Lights Go Down Low)	Atlantic 1071	—	—	—	Non-album track
1955	"He" b/w "Breeze (Blow My Baby Back to Me)"	Decca 29660	4	13	—	Hits by Hibbler
1955	"This Love of Mine" b/w "Every Hour on the Hour" (from Al Hibbler Sings Love Songs)	Norgran 143	—	—	—	Non-album track
1956	"11th Hour Melody" b/w "Let's Try Again"	Decca 29789	21	—	—	Hits by Hibbler
1956	"Never Turn Back" /	Decca 29950	22	—	—	Non-album tracks
1956	"Away All Boats"	Decca 29950	77	—	—	Non-album tracks
1956	"After the Lights Go Down Low" (re-recording) b/w "I Was Telling Her About You" (non-album track)	Decca 29982	10	—	—	Starring Al Hibbler
1956	"Don't Take Your Love from Me" b/w "I Got It Bad (and That Ain't Good)"	Aladdin 3328	—	—	—	I Surrender Dear
1956	"I'm Free" b/w "Nightfall"	Decca 30100	—	—	—	Non-album tracks
1956	"Silent Night" b/w "White Christmas"	Decca 30127	—	—	—	Non-album tracks
1957	"Trees" (re-recording) b/w "The Town Crier"	Decca 30176	92	—	—	Here's Hibbler
1957	"Sweet Slumber" b/w "Because of You"	Decca 30268	—	—	—	Here's Hibbler
1957	"I Complain" b/w "Around the Corner from the Blues"	Decca 30337	—	—	—	Non-album tracks
1957	"When Will I Forget You" b/w "Be Fair"	Decca 30397	—	—	—	Hits by Hibbler
1957	"I Wish" b/w "The Crying Wind" (non-album track)	Decca 30483	—	—	—	Hits by Hibbler
1958	"My Heart Tells Me" b/w "I'm Glad I'm Not Young Anymore" (non-album track)	Decca 30547	—	—	—	Hits by Hibbler
1958	"Ain't Nothing Wrong with That Baby" b/w "Honeysuckle Rose" (non-album track)	Decca 30622	—	—	—	Hits by Hibbler
1958	"Softly, My Love" b/w "Your Hands"	Decca 30684	—	—	—	Non-album tracks
1958	"Love Land" b/w "Love Me Long, Hold Me Close, Kiss Me Warm and Tender"	Decca 30752	—	—	—	Non-album tracks
1958	"Warm Heart – Cold Feet" b/w "Mine All Mine"	Decca 30817	—	—	—	Non-album tracks
1959	"He Is Always There" b/w "What Tis? What Tis? Tis Spring"	Decca 30870	—	—	—	Non-album tracks
1959	"It Won't Be Easy" b/w "Lonesome and Cold"	Decca 30946	—	—	—	Non-album tracks
1960	"Strawberry Hill" b/w "Stranger"	Top Rank 2089	—	—	—	Non-album tracks
1961	"Tall the Sky" b/w "Look Away"	Reprise 20035	—	—	—	Non-album tracks
1962	"Walk Away" b/w "I've Convinced Everyone But Me"	Reprise 20077	—	—	—	Non-album tracks
1966	"Good for a Lifetime" b/w "Once Before"	Satin 401	—	—	—	Non-album tracks
1967	"Let's Make the Most of a Beautiful Thing" b/w "Early One Morning"	Vegas 711	—	—	—	Non-album tracks

=== Albums ===
- Sings Duke Ellington (Norgran, 1954)
- Favorites (Norgran, 1954)
- Melodies by Al Hibbler (Argo/Chess, 1956)
- Sings Love Songs (Verve, 1956)
- Starring Al Hibbler (Decca, 1956)
- After the Lights Go Down Low: The Voice of Al Hibbler (Atlantic, 1957)
- Here's Hibbler (Decca, 1957)
- I Surrender Dear (Score/Aladdin, 1957)
- Torchy and Blue (Decca, 1958)
- Al Hibbler Remembers (Decca, 1958)
- Hits by Hibbler (Decca, 1958)
- Monday Every Day: Al Hibbler Sings the Blues (Reprise, 1961)
- Big Boy Blues (Grand Prix Series, 1964)
- Shades of Blue (Sunset, 1968)
- A Meeting of the Times with Rahsaan Roland Kirk (Atlantic, 1972)
- Christmas with Al Hibbler (Holiday, 1981)
- Solitude (Pickwick, 1997)

With Count Basie

- Basie Jazz (Clef MGC-633, 1954) – recordings from 1952

=== Compilations ===
- The Chronological Al Hibbler, 1946–1949 (Classics, 2002)
- The Chronological Al Hibbler, 1950–1952 (Classics, 2003)

== See also ==
- List of Decca Records label artists
- List of artists who reached number one on the Billboard R&B chart
