= I Talk with the Spirits =

Studio album by Roland Kirk
- Released: March 1965
- Recorded: September 16–17, 1964
- Genre: Jazz
- Length: 40:40
- Label: Limelight
- Producer: Bobby Scott

Roland Kirk chronology
Gifts & Messages (1964)	I Talk with the Spirits (1965)	Rip, Rig and Panic (1965)

Professional ratings
Review scores
Source	Rating
AllMusic	4.5/5 stars
The Penguin Guide to Jazz Recordings	3/4 stars

I Talk with the Spirits is a 1965 album by American jazz musician Roland Kirk. Kirk plays only flutes for this album, not the saxophone or other instruments he commonly used. It contains the first appearance of the song "Serenade to a Cuckoo", later covered by Jethro Tull.

== Track listing ==
All compositions by Roland Kirk except as indicated

1. "Serenade to a Cuckoo" – 4:33
2. Medley: "We'll Be Together Again"/"People" (Carl Fisher, Frankie Laine)/(Bob Merrill, Jule Styne) – 4:40
3. "A Quote from Clifford Brown" – 4:24
4. "Trees" (Joyce Kilmer, Oscar Rasbach) – 6:20
5. "Fugue'n and Alludin'" – 0:44
6. "The Business Ain't Nothin' But the Blues" – 5:03
7. "I Talk with the Spirits" – 3:56
8. "Ruined Castles" (Rentarō Taki) – 1:20
9. "Django" (John Lewis) – 4:50
10. "My Ship" (Ira Gershwin, Kurt Weill) – 5:00

- Recorded at Nola's Penthouse Sound Studios, NYC, September 16–17, 1964

== Personnel ==
- Roland Kirk: flute, alto flute, amplified flute, African wood flute, vocal interjections, cuckoo clock, music box
- Bobby Moses: vibraphone
- Horace Parlan: piano, celeste
- Michael Fleming: bass
- Walter Perkins: drums, percussion
- Crystal-Joy Albert: vocals
