= Gifts & Messages =

Studio album by Roland Kirk
- Released: 1964
- Recorded: July 22, 1964
- Genre: Jazz
- Label: Mercury

Roland Kirk chronology
Kirk in Copenhagen (1964)	Gifts & Messages (1964)	I Talk with the Spirits (1964)

Gifts & Messages is an album by the jazz multi-instrumentalist Roland Kirk. It was originally released on the Mercury label in 1964 and features performances by Kirk with Horace Parlan, Michael Fleming and Steve Ellington.

== Reception ==
Professional ratings
Review scores
Source	Rating
AllMusic	4.5/5 stars
The Penguin Guide to Jazz Recordings	3/4 stars
The Rolling Stone Jazz Record Guide	2/5 stars
The Virgin Encyclopedia of Jazz	3/5 stars

The editors of AllMusic awarded the album 4½ stars, with a reviewer describing it as "one of the most straightforward hard bop sessions recorded by Roland Kirk," while noting his "carefully thought-out yet often abandoned solos approaching free jazz at times." They also praised the "assured hard bop of his backing trio," which "does nothing to restrain Kirk's wilder fancies."

The authors of The Penguin Guide to Jazz Recordings wrote: "The whole set is peppered with quotes, allusions and tags from other songs, sometimes punning, sometimes surreal, always absolutely musical. Not the best recording... but the music more than makes up for any technical deficiencies."

== Track listing ==
All compositions by Roland Kirk except where noted.

1. "The Things I Love" (Lew Harris, Harold Barlow) - 3:12
2. "Petite Fleur" (Sidney Bechet) - 3:10
3. "March On, Swan Lake" (Pyotr Ilyich Tchaikovsky arranged by Roland Kirk) - 3:57
4. "Tears Sent By You" (Michael Fleming) - 5:59
5. "My Heart At Thy Sweet Voice" (Camille Saint-Saëns arranged by Roland Kirk) - 3:21
6. "Gifts And Messages" - 4:06
7. "Hip Chops" - 3:33
8. "Blues For C & T" - 3:06
9. "Where Does The Blame Lie" - 2:49
10. "Vertigo Ro" - 4:07

- Recorded in Los Angeles, CA on July 22, 1964

== Personnel ==
- Roland Kirk: tenor saxophone, manzello, stritch, flute, siren
- Horace Parlan: piano
- Michael Fleming: double bass
- Steve Ellington: drums
