= A Bucketful of Soul =

Studio album by Trudy Pitts & Mr. C.
- Released: 1968
- Recorded: December 20, 1967, and February 8, 1968
- Studio: Van Gelder Studio, Englewood Cliffs, New Jersey
- Genre: Jazz
- Label: Prestige; PR 7560
- Producer: Cal Lampley

Trudy Pitts chronology
These Blues of Mine (1967)	A Bucketful of Soul (1968)	The Excitement of Trudy Pitts (1968)

A Bucketful of Soul is the third album by jazz organist Trudy Pitts which was recorded in late 1967 and early 1968 and released on the Prestige label.

== Track listing ==
All compositions by Trudy Pitts except where noted.

1. "Bucket Full of Soul" (Bill Carney) – 3:50
2. "My Waltz" (Trudy Pitts) – 3:45
3. "Love for Sale" (Cole Porter) – 7:00
4. "Satin Doll" (Duke Ellington, Billy Strayhorn, Johnny Mercer) – 2:55
5. "The Shadow of Your Smile" (Johnny Mandel, Paul Francis Webster) – 3:00
6. "Renaissance" (Schere) – 2:35
7. "Lil' Darlin'" (Neal Hefti) – 4:10
8. "Come Dawn" – 4:20
9. "Please Keep My Dream" (Bill Carney, Sonny Truitt) – 2:25
- Recorded at Van Gelder Studio in Englewood Cliffs, New Jersey, on December 20, 1967 (tracks 1 & 6) and February 8, 1968 (tracks 2–5 & 7–9)

== Personnel ==
- Trudy Pitts – organ
- Wilbert Longmire – guitar
- Bill Carney – drums
