= After the Lights Go Down Low (album) =

Compilation album by Al Hibbler
- Released: 1957
- Recorded: April 19 and October 25, 1950, June 27, 1951 and 1956; NYC
- Genre: Vocal jazz
- Length: 40:20
- Label: Atlantic; SD 1251

Al Hibbler chronology
Starring Al Hibbler (1956)	After the Lights Go Down Low (1957)	Here's Hibbler! (1957)

After the Lights Go Down Low is an album by vocalist Al Hibbler, released by the Atlantic label in 1957. The album contains tracks that were recorded between 1950 and 1956, with several being released on the Original and Atlantic labels as singles.

== Reception ==
Professional ratings
Review scores
Source	Rating
AllMusic	4/5 stars
The Encyclopedia of Popular Music	3/5 stars
The Rolling Stone Album Guide	4/5 stars

AllMusic's Arwulf stated that "anyone else putting on such a show would run the risk of sounding foolish, Hibbler had so much class mingled with chutzpah that each performance feels like something from an impossible or imaginary jazz/lieder recital."

== Track listing ==
1. "After the Lights Go Down Low" (Leroy Lovett, Allen White) – 3:14
2. "You Will Be Mine" (Al Sears) – 3:14
3. "Dedicated to You" (Lovett, White) – 2:41
4. "Song of the Wanderer" (Neil Moret) – 2:23
5. "Tell Me" (Lovett) – 3:00
6. "Trav'lin' Light" (Jimmy Mundy, Trummy Young, Johnny Mercer) – 2:30
7. "Autumn Winds" (S. Gerwitz) – 3:16
8. "This Is Always" (Harry Warren, Mack Gordon) – 2:54
9. "Now I Lay Me Down to Dream" (Eddy Howard, Ted Fio Rito) – 3:15
10. "If I Knew You Were There" (Joe Bushkin, Milton Berle, Buddy Arnold) – 3:06
11. "I Won't Tell a Soul I Love You" (Hughie Clark, Ross Parker) – 3:12
12. "The Blues Came Falling Down" (Traditional) – 2:46
13. "Danny Boy" (Traditional) – 2:29 Bonus track on CD reissue
14. "Old Folks" (Dedette Lee Hill, Willard Robison) – 3:02 Bonus track on CD reissue
- Recorded in New York City on April 19, 1950 (tracks 3, 4, 10 & 13), October 25, 1950 (tracks 6, 12 & 14), June 27, 1951 (tracks 8, 9 & 11) and late 1954 (tracks 1, 2, 5 & 7)

== Personnel ==
- Al Hibbler – vocals with
- Billy Kyle and His Orchestra (tracks 3, 4, 10 & 13)
- Billy Taylor and His Orchestra (tracks 6, 12 & 14)
- Jimmy Mundy and His Orchestra (tracks 8, 9 & 11)
- Leroy Lovett and His Orchestra featuring Sam Taylor, Al Sears and Mickey Baker (tracks 1, 2, 5 & 7)
