= Here Comes the Whistleman =

Live album by Roland Kirk
- Released: February 1967
- Recorded: March 14, 1965
- Genre: Jazz
- Label: Atlantic
- Producer: Roland Kirk, Joel Dorn

Roland Kirk chronology
Rip, Rig and Panic (1965)	Here Comes the Whistleman (1967)	Slightly Latin (1965)

Professional ratings
Review scores
Source	Rating
AllMusic	4.5/5 stars
The Penguin Guide to Jazz Recordings	3/4 stars

Here Comes the Whistleman is a live album by jazz multi-instrumentalist Roland Kirk recorded in March 1965 at Atlantic Studios in New York, and released in February 1967. It was his first release on the Atlantic label and features performances by Kirk with pianists Lonnie Liston Smith and Jaki Byard, bassist Major Holley and drummer Charles Crosby.

== Critical reception ==
The AllMusic review by Thom Jurek states: "His band for the occasion is stellar ... This is the hard jump blues and deep R&B Roland Kirk band".

== Track listing ==
All compositions by Roland Kirk except as indicated.

1. "Roots" - 4:09
2. "Here Comes the Whistleman" - 4:53
3. "I Wished on the Moon" (Dorothy Parker, Ralph Rainger) - 4:48
4. "Making Love After Hours" - 4:20
5. "Yesterdays" (Otto Harbach, Jerome Kern) - 3:54
6. "Aluminum Baby" (Jaki Byard) - 4:41
7. "Step Right Up" - 4:41

- Recorded at Atlantic Studios, NY on March 14, 1965
- A recent version of the album has longer tracks. There's on-stage chatter etc.

== Personnel ==
- Roland Kirk: tenor saxophone, manzello, stritch, flute, clarinet
- Jaki Byard: piano (tracks 1, 3 & 6)
- Lonnie Liston Smith: piano (tracks 2, 4, 5 & 7)
- Major Holley: bass
- Charles Crosby: drums
