= Lights Go Out (disambiguation) =

Lights Go Out may refer to:

- "Lights Go Out", a song by Client from the 2006 album Heartland
- "Lights Go Out", a song by Fozzy from the 2014 album Do You Wanna Start a War
- "Lights Go Out", a song by J. Holiday from the 2009 album Round 2
- "Lights Go Out", a 2026 song by John Summit

== See also ==
- Lights Out (disambiguation)
- Lights Go Down (disambiguation)
