= Rip, Rig and Panic (album) =

Studio album by Rahsaan Roland Kirk
- Released: December 1965
- Recorded: January 13, 1965
- Studio: Van Gelder Studio (Englewood Cliffs, New Jersey)
- Genre: Post-bop
- Length: 35:05
- Label: Limelight
- Producer: Jack Tracy

Rahsaan Roland Kirk chronology
I Talk with the Spirits (1965)	Rip, Rig and Panic (1965)	Here Comes the Whistleman (1965)

Professional ratings
Review scores
Source	Rating
AllMusic	5/5 stars
The Penguin Guide to Jazz Recordings	3.5/4 stars
The Rolling Stone Jazz Record Guide	3/5 stars

Rip, Rig and Panic is a 1965 album by the American jazz multi-instrumentalist Rahsaan Roland Kirk. It features a quartet of Kirk, Jaki Byard (piano), Richard Davis (bass), and Elvin Jones (drums); they were described as "the most awesome rhythm section he ever recorded with". The session was held at Rudy Van Gelder's Englewood Cliffs studio. The set is made up primarily of original Kirk compositions.

The title of the album was explained by Kirk in the liner notes as follows: "Rip means Rip Van Winkle (or Rest in Peace?); it's the way people, even musicians are. They're asleep. Rig means like rigor mortis. That's where a lot of people’s minds are. When they hear me doing things they didn't think I could do they panic in their minds".

Kirk made many references to pioneers of jazz. "No Tonic Pres" refers to Lester Young; "From Bechet, Byas, and Fats" is a homage to Sidney Bechet, Don Byas, and Fats Waller; and "Once in a While" was inspired by Clifford Brown. Kirk also mentioned Edgard Varèse's compositions Poème électronique and Ionisation as inspirations for the album.

The English post-punk band Rip Rig + Panic named themselves after the album.

== Reception ==
Richard Cook and Brian Morton rated the Emarcy edition of the album, combined with the album Now Please Don't You Cry, Beautiful Edith, with the second-highest grade in their Penguin Guide to Jazz, and named the combined reissue as part of their suggested “core collection” of essential recordings; AllMusic awarded the album five stars.

== Track listing ==
All compositions by Roland Kirk except where indicated.

1. "No Tonic Press" – 4:34
2. "Once in a While" (Michael Edwards, Bud Green) – 4:02
3. "From Bechet, Byas, and Fats" – 6:31
4. "Mystical Dream" – 2:39
5. "Rip, Rig & Panic" – 7:00
6. "Black Diamond" (Milt Sealey) – 5:23
7. "Slippery, Hippery, Flippery" – 4:56

- Recorded at Van Gelder Studio, Englewood Cliffs, NJ on January 13, 1965

== Personnel ==
- Roland Kirk — tenor saxophone, stritch, manzello, flute, siren, oboe, castanets
- Jaki Byard — piano
- Richard Davis — double bass
- Elvin Jones — drums
