= Sanford Allen =

American classical violinist (born 1939)

Sanford Allen (born 1939) is an American classical violinist. At the age of 10, he began studying violin at the Juilliard School of Music and continued at the Mannes School of Music under Vera Fonaroff. He was the first African-American regular member of the Lewisohn Stadium Concerts Orchestra, joining in the summer of 1959. In 1962, shortly after winning the inaugural Young Concert Artists competition, he became the first full-time African-American violinist with the New York Philharmonic. After leaving the Philharmonic in 1977, Allen pursued a career as a soloist, teacher, and adviser on the arts. He also worked extensively recording film music.

Allen has been married to Madhur Jaffrey, the Indian-born actress, food and travel writer, and television personality, since 1969.

== Awards ==
- Federation of Music Clubs (1956)
- Young Concert Artists competition (1961)
- Koussevitzky International Recording Award (1974)

== Discography ==
With Ron Carter

- Super Strings (Milestone, 1981)

With Rahsaan Roland Kirk

- Kirkatron (Warner Bros, 1977)
