= Bright Moments (Rahsaan Roland Kirk album) =

Live album by Rahsaan Roland Kirk
- Released: 1974
- Recorded: June 8–9, 1973
- Genre: Jazz
- Label: Atlantic
- Producer: Joel Dorn

Rahsaan Roland Kirk chronology
Prepare Thyself to Deal With a Miracle (1973)	Bright Moments (1974)	The Case of the 3 Sided Dream in Audio Color (1975)

Professional ratings
Review scores
Source	Rating
AllMusic	5/5 stars
The Penguin Guide to Jazz Recordings	3/4 stars
DownBeat	4.5/5 stars

Bright Moments is a live album by the jazz multi-instrumentalist Rahsaan Roland Kirk, recorded at Keystone Korner, San Francisco, in June 1973 and released in 1974. It contains performances by Kirk with Ron Burton, Todd Barkan, Henry Mattathias Pearson, Robert Shy and Joe "Habao" Texidor.

== Reception ==
The AllMusic review by Steve Huey states: "Rahsaan Roland Kirk's live club gigs were usually engaging, freewheeling affairs, full of good humor and a fantastically wide range of music. The double album Bright Moments (reissued as a double CD) is a near-definitive document of the Kirk live experience, and his greatest album of the '70s. The extroverted Kirk was in his element in front of an audience, always chatting, explaining his concepts, and recounting bits of jazz history. Even if some of his long, jive-talking intros can sound a little dated today, it's clear in the outcome of the music that Kirk fed voraciously off the energy of the room... Bright Moments empties all the major items out of Kirk's bag of tricks, providing a neat microcosm of his talents and displaying a consummate and knowledgeable showman. In short, it's nothing less than a tour de force."

Neil Tesser gave the album 4.5 stars in his DownBeat review. He writes that Kirk, "grips an audience via the sincerity and exuberance of his sayings and playings. The bright moments shine often . . . Rahsaan’s a modern master with awesome technique, and he is so versatile that the word cannot fully apply to anyone else . . . Rahsaan’s musical fanaticism and sheer joy draw you into the world seen only by his inner eye, and when you leave, you're exhausted but fulfilled. He’s taken you on the trip he promised—and them some".

== Track listing ==
All compositions by Rahsaan Roland Kirk except as indicated.

1. Introduction - 2:06
2. "Pedal Up" - 11:52
3. "You'll Never Get to Heaven (If You Break My Heart)" (Burt Bacharach, Hal David) - 9:48
4. "Clickety Clack" - 2:30
5. "Prelude to a Kiss" (Duke Ellington, Irving Gordon, Irving Mills) - 5:05
6. "Talk (Electric Nose)" - 2:33
7. "Fly Town Nose Blues" - 8:52
8. "Talk (Bright Moments)" - 3:30
9. "Bright Moments" - 10:02
10. "Dem Red Beans and Rice" - 7:05
11. "If I Loved You" (Oscar Hammerstein II, Richard Rodgers) - 8:50
12. "Talk (Fats Waller)" - 1:30
13. "Jitterbug Waltz" (Richard Maltby Jr., Fats Waller) - 7:00
14. "Second Line Jump" - 1:30
- Recorded at Keystone Korner, San Francisco, CA, June 8 & 9, 1973

== Personnel ==
- Roland Kirk: tenor saxophone, manzello, stritch, clarinet, flute, nose flute, miscellaneous instruments
- Ron Burton: piano
- Todd Barkan: synthesizer, tambourine
- Henry Mattathias Pearson: bass
- Robert Shy: drums
- Joe Habao Texidor: percussion
