= Joe Texidor =

American jazz musician

Joseph "Habao" Texidor, also known as Joe "Habao" Texidor (July 23, 1941—October 19, 2007), was a Puerto Rican jazz percussionist known for his work with Rahsaan Roland Kirk during the late 1960s and throughout the 1970s.

He played percussion and created a sound tree to accommodate every percussive instrument he had or made.

== Personal life ==
Texidor was married to Donna Dinberg Texidor (September 3, 1942—April 11, 2009), a librarian. They had one daughter. He had three other daughters from a previous marriage.

== Discography ==
With Rahsaan Roland Kirk

- Volunteered Slavery, 1969
- Rahsaan Rahsaan, 1970
- Natural Black Inventions: Root Strata, 1971
- Blacknuss, 1972
- Bright Moments, 1973
- Other Folks' Music, 1976
- The Return of the 5000 Lb. Man, 1976

== Death ==
Texidor died in Ottawa, Canada on October 19, 2007.
