= After the Lights Go Down Low =

1956 song

Song
- Published: 1956
- Songwriters: Phil Belmonte, Allen White, Leroy C. Lovett

"After The Lights Go Down Low" is a popular song written by Phil Belmonte, Allen White and Leroy C. Lovett and published in 1956. It has been recorded by many artists. The major hit at time of introduction was Al Hibbler, who reached the national top 15.

== Partial list of recordings ==
- Ann-Margret
- Shirley Bassey
- Jaki Byard
- Vic Damone
- The Equals
- Marvin Gaye
- Earl Grant
- Buddy Greco
- Al Hibbler
- Al Kooper
- George Maharis
- Freda Payne
- Lou Rawls
- The Scofflaws
- Joe Simon
- Joanie Sommers
- The Stylistics
- Mary Wells
