= Blacknuss =

Studio album by Rahsaan Roland Kirk
- Released: 1972
- Recorded: August 31, September 8, 1971
- Genre: Jazz
- Length: 42:46
- Label: Atlantic
- Producer: Joel Dorn

Rahsaan Roland Kirk chronology
Natural Black Inventions: Root Strata (1971)	Blacknuss (1972)	A Meeting of the Times (1972)

Blacknuss is an album by Rahsaan Roland Kirk. It was recorded in 1971 and released by Atlantic Records.

== Recording and music ==
The album was recorded in New York City on August 31 and September 8, 1971. Much of the material is pop tunes.

== Release and reception ==
Professional ratings
Review scores
Source	Rating
AllMusic	4.5/5 stars
The Penguin Guide to Jazz	3.5/4 stars

Blacknuss was released by Atlantic Records. The AllMusic reviewer wrote: "Blacknuss [...] is Kirk at his most visionary. [...] Blacknuss is as deep as a soul record can be and as hot as a jazz record has any right to call itself." The Penguin Guide to Jazz wrote that "Some of the arrangements are guitar-heavy and the backbeats are decidedly uncouth", and that the record label probably influenced the choice of material, but that Kirk was comfortable with playing it.

== Track listing ==
1. "Ain't No Sunshine" (Bill Withers) – 2:26
2. "What's Goin' On/Mercy Mercy Me (The Ecology)" (Renaldo Benson, Al Cleveland, Marvin Gaye) – 3:47
3. "I Love You, Yes I Do" (Chris Allen, Johnny Cameron) – 2:49
4. "Take Me Girl, I'm Ready" (Johnny Bristol, Pam Sawyer, LaVerne Ware) – 3:18
5. "My Girl" (Smokey Robinson, Ronald White) – 3:06
6. "Which Way Is It Going" (Rahsaan Roland Kirk) – 2:26
7. "One Nation" (Princess Patience Burton) – 3:41
8. "Never Can Say Goodbye" (Clifton Davis) – 4:02
9. "Old Rugged Cross" (Trad.) – 7:15
10. "Make It With You" (David Gates) – 4:50
11. "Blacknuss" (Kirk) – 5:12

== Personnel ==
- Rahsaan Roland Kirk - flute, electric guitar, gong, tenor saxophone, tin whistle, stritch, manzello, vocals
- Princess Patience Burton - vocals
- Billy Butler - electric guitar
- Cornell Dupree - electric guitar
- Dick Griffin - trombone
- Cissy Houston - vocals
- Arthur Jenkins - conga drums, cabasa
- Richard Landrum - conga drums, percussion
- Keith Loving - electric guitar
- Charles McGhee - trumpet
- Khalil Mhrdi - drums
- Henry Pearson - bass guitar
- Bernard "Pretty" Purdie - drums
- Bill Salter - bass guitar
- Sonelius Smith - piano
- Richard Tee - piano
- Joseph "Habao" Texidor - percussion
- Mickey Tucker - organ
- Joel Dorn - producer
