= Sonny Brown (musician) =

American jazz drummer (born 1936)

- Born: Gerald Brown; April 20, 1936 (age 90); Cincinnati, Ohio, U.S.
- Genres: Jazz
- Occupation: Musician
- Instrument: Drums

Gerald "Sonny" Brown (born April 20, 1936) is an American jazz drummer.

After having played with Eddie "Cleanhead" Vinson, Amos Milburn, and Dinah Washington, Brown moved to New York in 1961, where he performed with Frank Foster, Randy Weston, Ray Bryant, Kenny Burrell, Jon Hendricks (1963–64), Gildo Mahones (1964), Clifford Jordan, Curtis Fuller, Coleman Hawkins, Sonny Rollins, Zoot Sims, Lee Konitz, Archie Shepp, Sam Rivers, and Charles Mingus.

He recorded for Rahsaan Roland Kirk in 1960, then going on to perform with Kirk's groups until 1976.

From 1968, Brown performed with the New York Bass Violin Choir, also writing an opera with its director, Bill Lee.
