= Rahsaan Roland Kirk =

American jazz multi-instrumentalist (1935–1977)

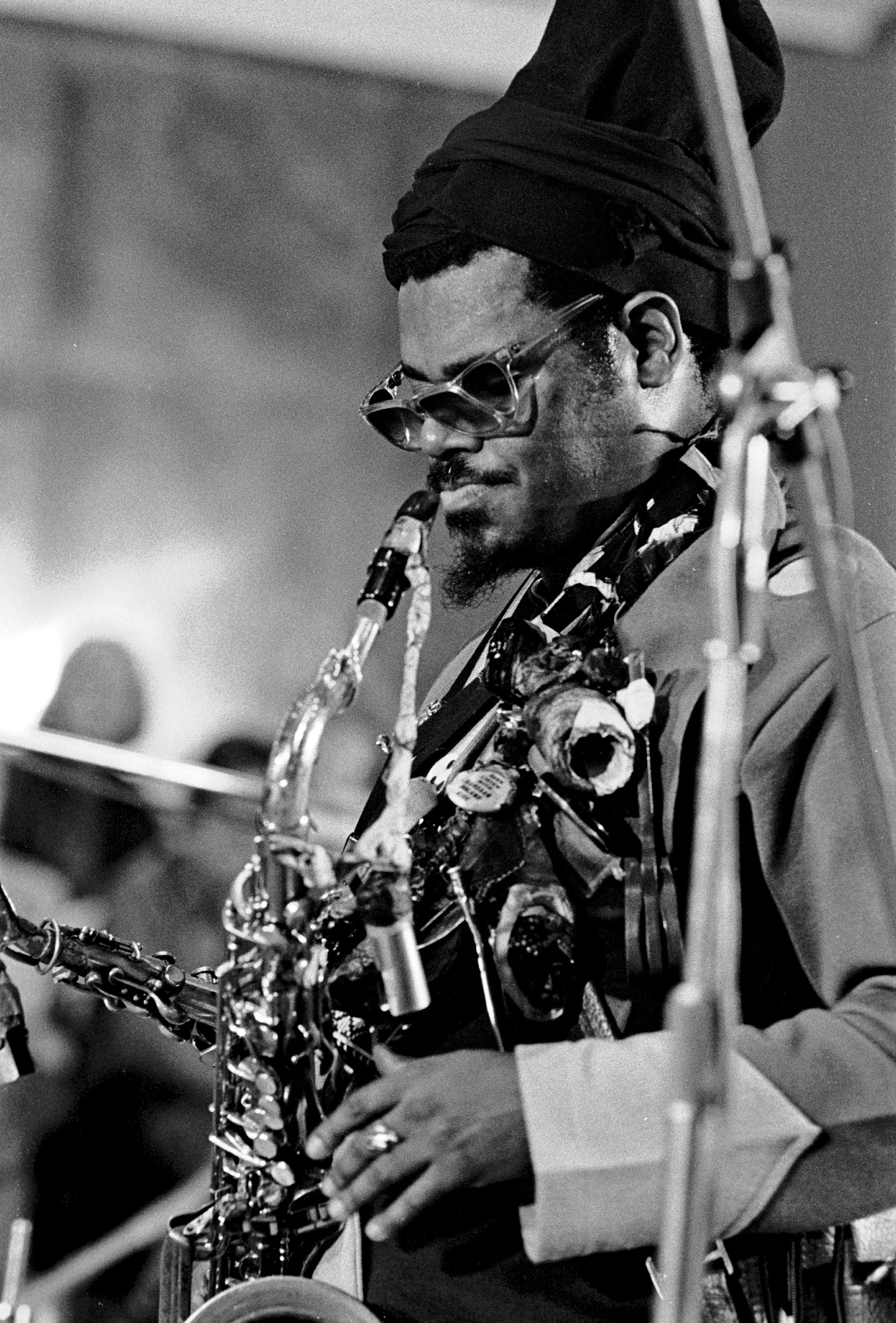
- Kirk performing in 1972

Background information
- Born: Ronald Theodore Kirk; August 7, 1935; Columbus, Ohio, U.S.
- Died: December 5, 1977 (aged 42) Bloomington, Indiana, U.S.
- Genres: Jazz; hard bop; soul jazz
- Occupations: Musician; composer; arranger; bandleader
- Instruments: Saxophone; flute; "stritch"; "manzello"; clarinet; nose flute; English horn; keyboards; percussion
- Years active: 1955–1977
- Labels: King; Chess; Prestige; Mercury; Limelight; Verve; Atlantic; Warner Bros.
- Formerly of: Charles Mingus; Quincy Jones

Rahsaan Roland Kirk (born Ronald Theodore Kirk; August 7, 1935 – December 5, 1977), known earlier in his career simply as Roland Kirk, was an American jazz multi-instrumentalist who played tenor saxophone, flute, and many other instruments. He was renowned for his onstage vitality; in his shows, virtuoso improvisation was accompanied by comic banter, political ranting, and the simultaneous playing of several instruments.

== Life ==
Ronald Theodore Kirk was born in Columbus, Ohio, where he lived in a neighborhood known as Flytown. He became blind at two years old, which he said was a result of improper medical treatment. As a teenager, Kirk studied at the Ohio State School for the Blind. By age 15, he was on the road playing rhythm and blues on weekends with Boyd Moore's band. According to saxophonist Hank Crawford, "He would be like this 14-year-old blind kid playing two horns at once. They would bring him out and he would tear the joint up." Crawford heard him during this period and said he was unbelievable. He remarked, "Now they had him doing all kinds of goofy stuff but he was playing the two horns and he was playing the shit out of them. He was an original from the beginning." Kirk felt compelled by a dream to transpose two letters in his first name to make "Roland". In 1970, Kirk added "Rahsaan" to his name after hearing it in a dream.

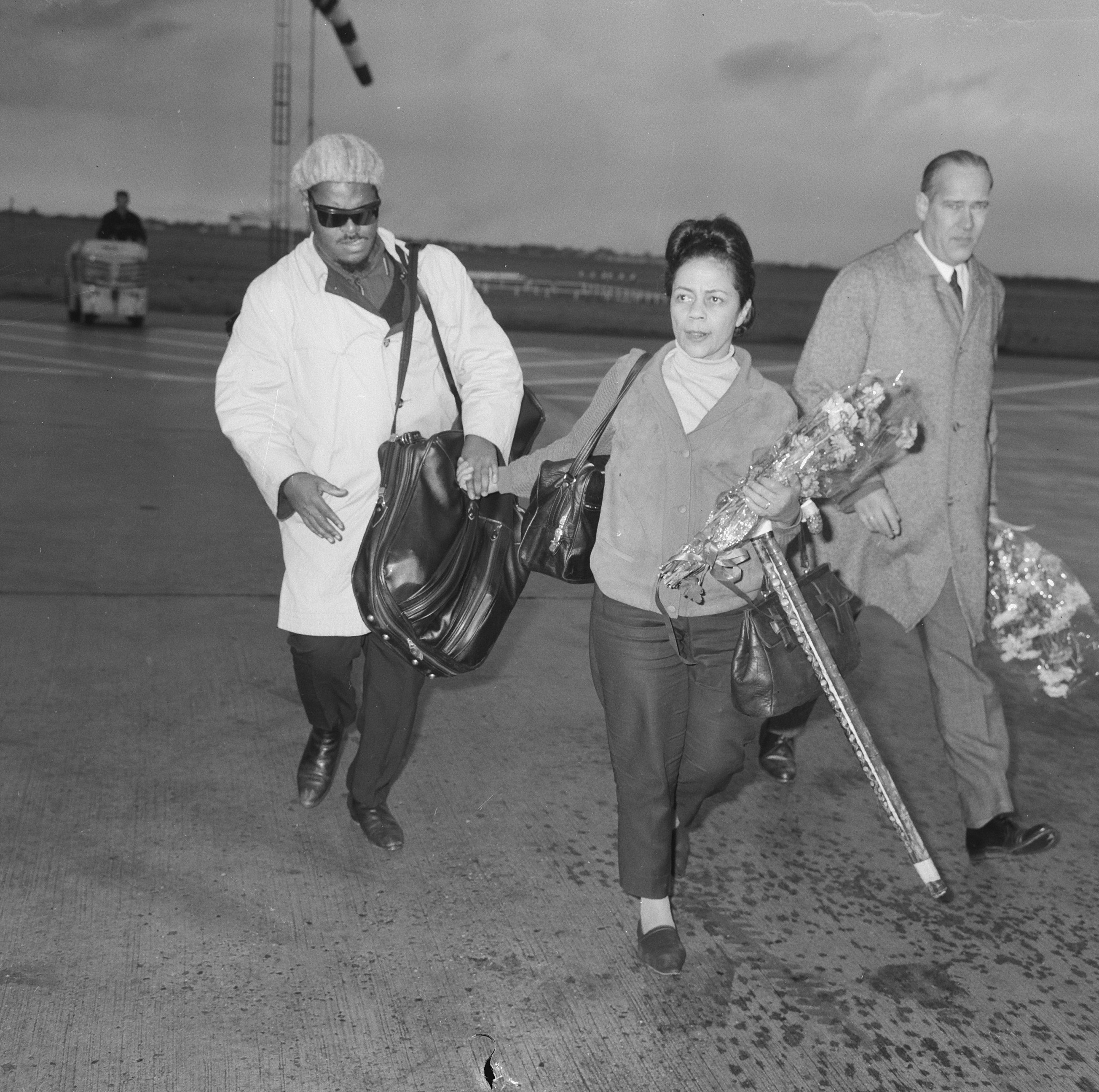
Kirk arriving at Schiphol in Amsterdam, 1964. His first wife, Edith, walks beside him.

Kirk was politically outspoken. During his concerts, between songs, he often talked about topical issues, including African-American history and the civil rights movement. His monologues were often laced with satire and absurdist humor. According to comedian Jay Leno, when Leno toured with Kirk as Kirk's opening act, Kirk would introduce him by saying, "I want to introduce a young brother who knows the black experience and knows all about the white devils. ... Please welcome Jay Leno!"

In 1975, Kirk had a major stroke which led to partial paralysis of one side of his body. He continued to perform and record, modifying his instruments to enable him to play with one arm. At a live performance at Ronnie Scott's Jazz Club in London he even managed to play two instruments, and carried on to tour internationally and to appear on television.

He died from a second stroke on December 5, 1977, aged 42, the morning after performing in the Frangipani Room of the Indiana University Student Union in Bloomington, Indiana.

Columbus Mayor Jack Sensenbrenner declared Saturday, December 10, 1970, "Rahsaan day", according to an obituary in The Columbus Dispatch that appeared on Thursday, December 8, 1977.

Kirk's hometown of Columbus was not appreciative of his work for most of his career. He was thrown out of a local nightclub because his music was too difficult to understand, and he left for Los Angeles and further touring. In the 21st century, jazz fans in Columbus have been embracing his legacy.

His widow, Dorthaan Kirk, became notable in her own right for her work as a curator and producer of jazz events primarily connected with Newark, dating back to her joining WBGO, New Jersey's first public jazz station, in 1978, leading to her being a recipient of the 2020 A.B. Spellman NEA Jazz Masters Fellowship for Jazz Advocacy.

== Instruments and techniques ==
Kirk playing simultaneously his "manzello" (left), "stritch" (center), and tenor saxophone; Helinski Jazz Festival, 1964

Kirk's musical career spanned from 1955 until his death in 1977. He moved to New York City in 1960. He preferred to lead his own bands and rarely performed as a sideman, although he did record with arranger Quincy Jones, drummer Roy Haynes, and worked with bassist Charles Mingus. One of his best-known recorded performances is the lead flute and solo on Jones's "Soul Bossa Nova", a 1964 hit song repopularized in the Austin Powers films.

Kirk's multi-instrumentality was credited as having a substantial musical conception. This inclusivity included blues music, a love of stride piano and early jazz, and an appreciation for pop tunes. However, his vision was much wider than that of most of his contemporaries. According to producer Joel Dorn, he was also hugely knowledgeable about classical music. Pieces by Saint-Saëns, Hindemith, Tchaikovsky, Dvořák, and Villa-Lobos would all feature on his albums over the years, alongside standards, pop songs, and original compositions. Kirk's influences went beyond jazz, and consequentially, he preferred the term "black classical music".

His playing was generally rooted in soul jazz or hard bop, but Kirk's knowledge of jazz history allowed him to draw from many elements of the music's past, from ragtime to swing and free jazz. Kirk also absorbed classical influences, and his artistry reflected elements of pop music by composers such as Smokey Robinson and Burt Bacharach, as well as Duke Ellington, John Coltrane, and other jazz musicians.

Kirk played and collected many musical instruments, mainly multiple saxophones, clarinets, and flutes. His primary saxophones were a standard tenor saxophone, "stritch" (a straight alto saxophone lacking the instrument's conventional upturned bell), and a "manzello" (a modified King Saxello soprano saxophone, with a larger, upturned bell). A number of his instruments were exotic or homemade. Kirk modified instruments himself to accommodate his simultaneous playing technique. Critic Gary Giddins wrote that Kirk's tenor playing alone would have been enough to secure his reputation.

Usually, he appeared on stage with all three horns hanging around his neck, and at times he would play a number of these horns at once, harmonizing with himself, or sustain a note for lengthy durations by using circular breathing. He used the multiple horns to play true chords, essentially functioning as a one-man saxophone section. Kirk insisted that he was only trying to emulate the sounds he heard in his head. Even while playing two or three saxophones at once, the music was intricate, powerful jazz with a strong feel for the blues. The live album Bright Moments (1973) is an example of one of his shows.

Kirk was also an influential flute player, including recorders. According to Giddins, Kirk was the first major jazz innovator on flute after Eric Dolphy (who died in 1964). Kirk employed several techniques, including singing or humming into the flute at the same time as playing. Another was to play the standard transverse flute at the same time as a nose flute.

He played a variety of other instruments, including whistles, clarinet, harmonica, and English horn. He often kept a gong within reach and was a competent trumpeter. He utilized unique approaches, such as playing a trumpet with a saxophone mouthpiece.

He also made use of non-musical devices, such as alarm clocks, sirens, or a section of common garden hose (dubbed "the black mystery pipes"). From the early 1970s, his studio recordings used tape-manipulated musique concrète and primitive electronic sounds before such things became commonplace.

The Case of the 3 Sided Dream in Audio Color was a unique album in the annals of recorded jazz and popular music. It was a two-LP set, with side-4 apparently "blank", the label not indicating any content. However, once word of "the secret message" got around among Rahsaan's fans, one would find that about 12 minutes into side-4 appeared the first of two telephone answering machine messages recorded by Kirk, the second following soon thereafter (but separated by more blank grooves). The surprise impact of these segments appearing on "blank" side-4 was lost on the initial CD reissue of this album (though restored as track 20 on the CD re-release).

He gleaned information on what was happening in the world via radio and TV. His later recordings often incorporated his spoken commentaries on current events, including Richard Nixon's involvement in the Watergate scandal. The 3-Sided Dream album was a "concept album" that incorporated "found" or environmental sounds and tape loops, tapes being played backwards, and more. Snippets of Billie Holiday singing are also heard briefly. The album even confronts the rise of influence of computers in society, as Kirk threatens to pull the plug on the machine trying to tell him what to do.

In the 1976 album Other Folks' Music, the spoken words of Paul Robeson, another outspoken black artist, can be briefly heard.

== Legacy and influence ==
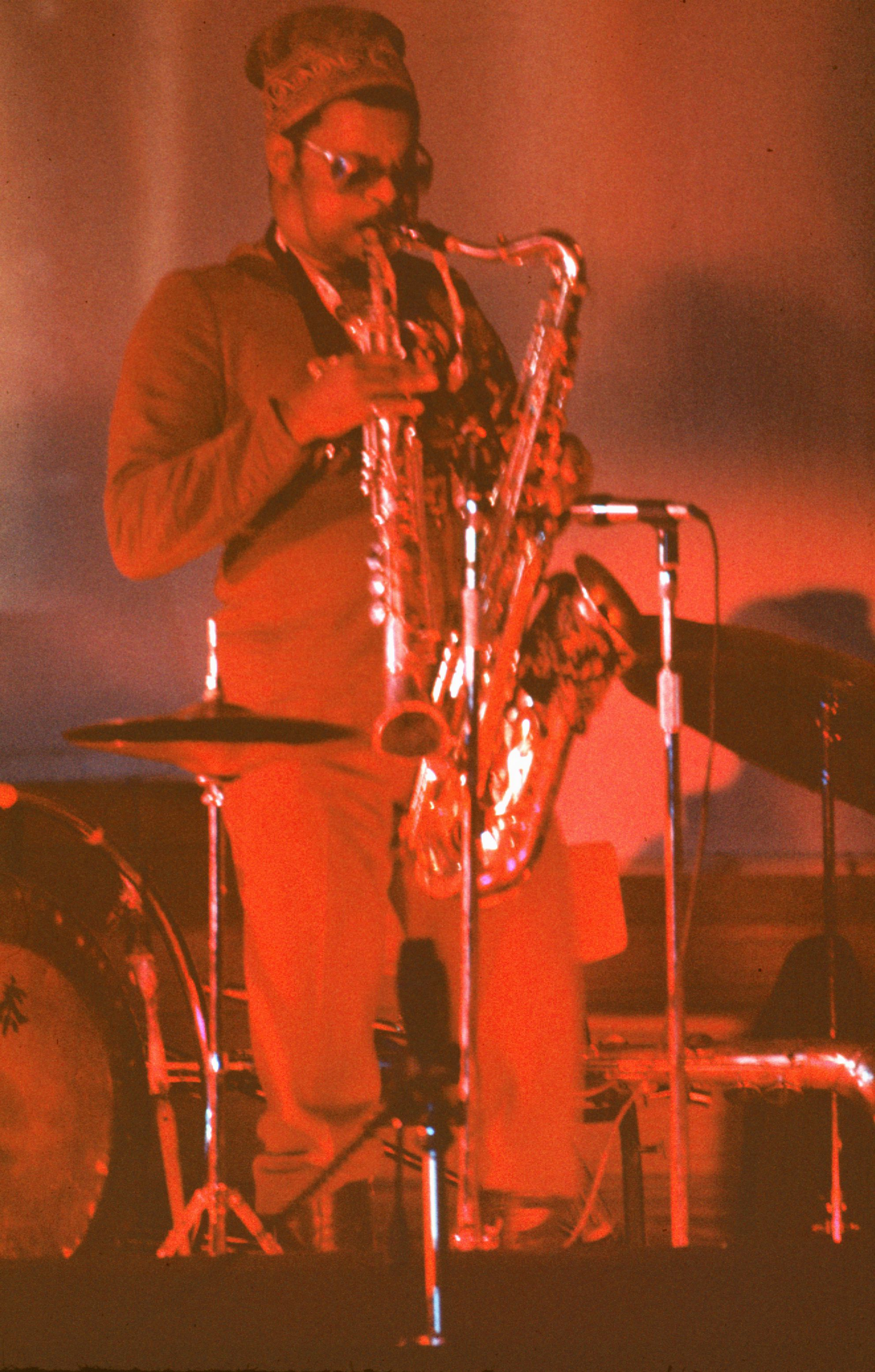
Kirk at Lanchester Polytechnic, 1972

- Ian Anderson, leader and flautist of Jethro Tull, recorded a version of Kirk's "Serenade to a Cuckoo" on their first album This Was (1968). Roland Kirk's playing prompted Anderson to believe he could bring a flute into rock music. Anderson learned Kirk's vocalizing style on the flute and Anderson's flute playing became the signature element of Jethro Tull's sound. Anderson got to know Kirk at the 1969 Newport Jazz Festival where they both performed the same night. Anderson said of Kirk, "There's something about these colourful shamans. They can tease us, but we go along with it, because we know they're touched by genius, but at the same time there's a little bit of the snake oil for sale."
- Jeff Coffin, saxophonist of Béla Fleck and the Flecktones, was heavily influenced by Kirk's music and says he learned through Kirk that it's okay to experiment with an instrument. He used Kirk's multi-horn inventions with the Flecktones and on his solo album Mutopia.
- Guitarist Jimi Hendrix "idolized" Kirk and even hoped to collaborate with him one day.
- Frank Zappa had been influenced by Kirk's music to a considerable extent early in his career. In the liner notes to his 1966 debut album with The Mothers of Invention, Freak Out!, Zappa cites Kirk as one of many in a lengthy list of personal musical influences. Kirk and Zappa performed live together at least once, at the 1969 Boston Globe Jazz Festival.
- Derek Trucks, a huge Kirk fan, recorded Kirk's composition "Volunteered Slavery" with his namesake group for the 2004 album Live at Georgia Theatre, the 2006 studio album Songlines, and the DVD Songlines Live. He said that hearing Kirk's music "felt much the same way those Hendrix records felt, that he was blowing the rules wide open..."
- David Jackson, of Van der Graaf Generator, was also highly influenced by the style and technique of Kirk, and he has played multiple saxophones simultaneously since at least 1969.
- Guitarist Michael Angelo Batio said in a 2008 interview with Ultimate Guitar Archive that Kirk's playing of two saxophones at once inspired him to create his "double guitar".
- T. J. Kirk was a band named after the three artists it tributed: Thelonious Monk, James Brown, and Rahsaan Roland Kirk. Formed by eight-string guitarist Charlie Hunter as a side group to his own self-titled band, the band's other members included Scott Amendola, Will Bernard, and John Schott.
- Paul Weller cited the Kirk album I Talk with the Spirits (1964) as one of his "most influential albums" in an interview with The Times in 2009.
- Björk named "The Inflated Tear" as one of her favorite jazz pieces, calling it "primitive and instinctive", "open to nature", and "punk".
- Davey Payne's twin saxophone solo on "Hit Me with Your Rhythm Stick" (Ian Dury and the Blockheads, 1978) was inspired by Kirk.
- Terry Edwards's twin saxophone solo on "The Ministry of Defence" by PJ Harvey (2016) was inspired by Kirk.
- Eric Burdon and War's 1970 debut album, Eric Burdon Declares "War", features the track "The Vision of Rassan", which is broken up into two pieces: "Dedication" and "Roll on Kirk".
- The English post-punk group Rip Rig + Panic was named after the album of the same name by Roland Kirk.
- Clutch pays tribute to Roland Kirk in the song "Three Golden Horns" on their 2022 album Sunrise on Slaughter Beach.
- Jazz house musician Berlioz pays homage to Kirk with "Ode to Rahsaan" on the 2024 album Open This Wall.
- Saxophonist Michael Blake recorded tenor and soprano saxophone simultaneously on several albums in the 2000s. He covered Kirk's "Three for Dizzy" on Danish drummer Kresten Osgood's Hammond Rens (2002) and can be heard playing both horns on New Blues, Old News (Michael Blake, Elevated) and Weazy (Ben Allison, Riding the Nuclear Tiger).

== Discography ==
=== As leader ===
- 1956: Triple Threat (King, 1957)
- 1960: Introducing Roland Kirk (Argo/Cadet/Chess, 1960)
- 1961: Kirk's Work (Prestige, 1961)
- 1961: We Free Kings (Mercury, 1962)
- 1962: Domino (Mercury, 1962)
- 1963: Reeds & Deeds (Mercury, 1963)
- 1963: The Roland Kirk Quartet Meets the Benny Golson Orchestra (Mercury, 1963)
- 1963: Kirk in Copenhagen (Mercury, 1964) – live
- 1964: Gifts & Messages (Mercury, 1964)
- 1964: I Talk with the Spirits (Limelight, 1965)
- 1965: Rip, Rig and Panic (Limelight, 1965)
- 1965: Here Comes the Whistleman (Atlantic, 1967)
- 1965: Slightly Latin (Limelight, 1966)
- 1967: Now Please Don't You Cry, Beautiful Edith (Verve, 1967)
- 1967: The Inflated Tear (Atlantic, 1968)
- 1968: Left & Right (Atlantic, 1969)
- 1968–69: Volunteered Slavery (Atlantic, 1969)
- 1970: Rahsaan Rahsaan (Atlantic, 1970) – live
- 1971: Natural Black Inventions: Root Strata (Atlantic, 1971)
- 1971: Blacknuss (Atlantic, 1972)
- 1965, '72: A Meeting of the Times (Atlantic, 1972)
- 1972: I, Eye, Aye: Live at the Montreux Jazz Festival, 1972 (Rhino, 1996) – live; posthumous release
- 1972: Brotherman in the Fatherland (Hyena, 2006) – live in Germany; posthumous release
- 1973: Prepare Thyself to Deal with a Miracle (Atlantic, 1973)
- 1973: Bright Moments (Atlantic, 1974)
- 1974: Compliments of the Mysterious Phantom (Hyena, 2003) – live; posthumous release
- 1975: The Case of the 3 Sided Dream in Audio Color (Atlantic, 1975)
- 1975: The Return of the 5000 Lb. Man (Warner Bros., 1976)
- 1975–76: Kirkatron (Warner Bros., 1977) – partially live
- 1975–76: Boogie-Woogie String Along for Real (Warner Bros., 1977)
- 1976: Other Folks' Music (Atlantic, 1976)

Compilations and box sets

- Hip (Fontana, 1965)
- The Man Who Cried Fire (Night, 1990)
- Rahsaan: The Complete Mercury Recordings of Roland Kirk (Mercury, 1990)[10CD]
- Does Your House Have Lions: The Rahsaan Roland Kirk Anthology (Rhino, 1993)[2CD]
- Simmer, Reduce, Garnish & Serve (Warner Archives, 1995) – compilation of tracks from his final three Warner albums: The Return of the 5000 Lb. Man (1976), Kirkatron (1977), and Boogie-Woogie String Along for Real (1977)
- Talkin' Verve: Roots of Acid Jazz (Verve, 1996)
- The Art of Rahsaan Roland Kirk – The Atlantic (Atlantic, 1996)[2LP]
- Dog Years in the Fourth Ring (32 Jazz, 1997) – rec. 1963–75
- Aces Back to Back (32 Jazz, 1998)[4CD] – combines Left & Right (1968), Rahsaan Rahsaan (1970), Prepare Thyself to Deal With a Miracle (1973), and Other Folks' Music (1976)
- A Standing Eight (32 Jazz, 1998)[2CD] – combines The Return of the 5000 Lb. Man (1976), Kirkatron (1977), and Boogie-Woogie String Along for Real (1977)
- Left Hook, Right Cross (32 Jazz, 1999)[2CD] – combines Volunteered Slavery (1969) and Blacknuss (1972)
- Third Dimension and Beyond (Gambit, 2005) – combines Triple Threat (1957) and Introducing Roland Kirk (1960)
- Only The Best of Rahsaan Roland Kirk Volume 1 (Collectables, 2009)[7CD] – combines Blacknuss, The Case of the 3 Sided Dream in Audio Color, The Inflated Tear / Natural Black Inventions: Root Strata, Kirkatron, Boogie-Woogie String Along for Real, and Other Folks' Music

=== As sideman ===
With Quincy Jones

- Big Band Bossa Nova (Mercury, 1962)
- Quincy Jones Explores the Music of Henry Mancini (Mercury, 1964)
- I/We Had a Ball (Limelight, 1965) – rec. 1964–65
- Quincy Plays for Pussycats (Mercury, 1965) – rec. 1959–65
- In the Heat of the Night OST (United Artists, 1967)
- Walking in Space (CTI, 1969)

With Charles Mingus

- Tonight at Noon (Atlantic, 1964) – rec. 1961
- Oh Yeah (Atlantic, 1962)
- Mingus at Carnegie Hall (Atlantic, 1974)

With others

- Jaki Byard, The Jaki Byard Experience (Prestige, 1969) – rec. 1968
- Tubby Hayes, Tubby's Back in Town (Smash, 1962)
- Roy Haynes, Out of the Afternoon (Impulse!, 1962)
- Les McCann, Live at Montreux (Atlantic, 1973) – live, rec. 1972
- Tommy Peltier, The Jazz Corps Under the Direction of Tommy Peltier (Pacific Jazz, 1967)

== Bibliography ==
- Kruth, John (2000). Bright Moments. The Life and Legacy of Rahsaan Roland Kirk. New York: Welcome Rain Publishers. ISBN 1-56649-105-3.
