= 32 Records =

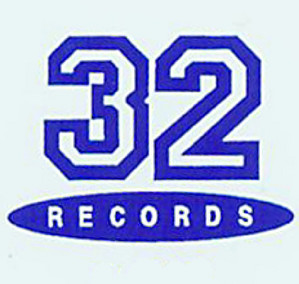
- Founded: 1995
- Founder: Joel Dorn, Robert Miller
- Defunct: 2001
- Genre: Jazz, blues, rhythm and blues, pop
- Country of origin: U.S.
- Location: New York City

32 Records was an American record label established in 1995 by record producer Joel Dorn and attorney Robert Miller. Its 32 Jazz imprint released a successful series of compilation albums. It was named for Dorn's favorite sports number. It also released new material by artists such as The Jazz Passengers and established 32 R&B, 32 Blues, 32 Groove, and 32 Pop subsidiaries.

32 Records acquired the holdings of the Muse and Landmark labels, and established the 32 Jazz subsidiary in 1997 with the aim of re-issuing numerous jazz recordings. During the late 1990s, 32 Jazz released a successful series of inexpensive "Jazz for..." compilations. The first of these, Jazz for a Rainy Afternoon, was released in 1997 in conjunction with Elle. In 1999, it had become the top jazz label in the Billboard charts, before Verve Music Group merged its Verve and GRP holdings into a single output.

By 2000, Miller had become CEO of CDBeat, which owned 32 Records as a subsidiary. In March 2000, Dorn resigned from the company and formed Label M later that year. Upon Dorn's departure, CDBeat announced that it would discontinue 32 Records by March 2001, although in June 2000 it hired producer Todd Barkan to replace Dorn. CDBeat, in turn, would become Spinrocket and then ConnectivCorp. Savoy Jazz acquired the rights to the Muse and Landmark catalogs from 32 Records in October 2003, and by the end of the year, ConnectivCorp had merged with Majesco.

== Partial discography ==
#	Album	Artist	Previous issues	Notes
32001	Looking for an Echo	Kenny Vance & the Planotones	first issue	
32002	Revenge!	Charles Mingus	first non-bootleg release of this material	2CD
32003	The First Album	Roomful of Blues		
32004	Prisoners of Love	Robert Miller Group	first release	
32005	Re-Entry	Horace Silver		
32006	Pure Mose	Mose Allison		
32007	Individually Twisted	The Jazz Passengers	first release	
32008	For the Love of Monk	Various Artists		includes two previously unreleased Monk performances
32009	Endgame Brilliance	Sonny Stitt	Tune-Up! (Muse MR 5334); Constellation (Muse MR 5323)	
32010	The Complete Muse Sessions	Houston Person & Ron Carter	Something in Common (Muse MR 5376); Now's the Time (Muse MR 5421)	
32011	The Complete Landmark Sessions	Kronos Quartet	Monk Suite (Landmark); Music of Bill Evans (Landmark)	
32012	...on Second Thought	José Feliciano		
32013	Back in the Day	Ike & Tina Turner	first release	
32014	Lone Star Legend	David "Fathead" Newman	Still Hard Times (Muse); Resurgence! (Muse)	
32015	Two Classic Albums	Roomful of Blues	Eddie "Cleanhead" Vinson & Roomful of Blues (Muse MR 5282)...with Big Joe Turner	
32016	Musique du Bois	Phil Woods	Muse	
32017	Body and Soul	Al Cohn & Zoot Sims	Muse	
32018	Bar Wars	Willis Jackson	first release	
32019	The Moontrane	Woody Shaw	Muse (MR 5472)	
32020	Lost and Found	Houston Person & Charles Brown	first release (tracks 1–7); Wild Flower (1977; Muse) (tracks 8-12)	
32021	Footprints	Pat Martino		
32022	Master Class	Hank Jones	'Bop Redux (Muse); Groovin' High (Muse)	
32023	Soft Spoken Here	Kenny Barron	Golden Lotus (Muse); Sunset to Dawn (Muse)	
32024	Last of the Line	Woody Shaw	Cassandrite (Muse); Love Dance (Muse)	
32025	Hit Jazz	Various Artists	compilation	
32026	Songs That Made the Phone Light Up	Various Artists	compilation	
32027	My Mother's Eyes	Etta Jones	Muse MR 5145	
32028	Out of Nowhere	Sonny Stitt	Muse	
32029	Epistrophy	Charlie Rouse	Landmark	
32030	The Re-Entry	Jack McDuff		
32031	Easy Easy	Johnny Lytle	Fast Hands (Muse); Happy Ground (Muse)	
32032	Dog Years in the Fourth Ring	Rahsaan Roland Kirk	2CD unreleased material plus Natural Black Inventions: Root Strata (Atlantic SD 1578)	3CD
32033	B-3in'	Various Artists	compilation	
32034	Christmas with Houston Person & Etta Jones	Houston Person & Etta Jones		
32035	Greatest Performances	Tom Jones	"...culled from his 1980-1981 TV series"	2CD
32036	Stolen ... & Other Moments	Mark Murphy		2CD
32037	Vibe Wise	Bobby Hutcherson	Good Bait (Landmark); Color Schemes (Landscape)	2CD
32038	First Half Highlights	Kenny Barron		
32039	Dark Journey	Woody Shaw	compilation	2CD
32040	Lost in the Shuffle	Jimmy Reed	compilation	
32041	Cream	Pat Martino	compilation	
32042	Every Once in a While	Morgana King	I Just Can't Stop Loving You (Muse); This Is Always (Muse)	2CD
32043	Fire	Carlos Garnett	compilation	
32044	According to Mr Roney	Wallace Roney	compilation	2CD
32045	Feelin' It Together	James Moody	Muse	
32046	Naima	Cedar Walton	Muse	
32047	Groove's Groove	Richard "Groove" Holmes	compilation of Muse material	
32048	Iron City	Grant Green	Muse	
32049	Crisscraft	Sonny Criss	Muse	
32050	Head and Heart	Pat Martino	Consciousness (Muse); Pat Martino/Live! (Muse)	2CD
32051	Just in Case You Forgot How Bad He Really Was	Sonny Stitt	first release	
32052	Turkish Women at the Bath	Pete La Roca	Bliss by Chick Corea (Muse)	with John Gilmore
32053	It's Mister Fathead	David "Fathead" Newman	Fathead: Ray Charles Presents David Newman (Atlantic); Straight Ahead (Atlantic); Fathead Comes On (Atlantic); House of David (Atlantic)	2CD
32054	Memphis, Ray & a Touch of Moody	Hank Crawford	More Soul (Atlantic); From the Heart (Atlantic); Soul of the Ballad (Atlantic); Dig These Blues (Atlantic)	2CD
32055	Chapters 1 & 2	Mulgrew Miller		
32056	Live in Philly	Zoot Sims	first release	
32057	The Heavy Hitter	Eddie "Lockjaw" Davis		
32058	Major Jazz, Minor Blues	Larry Coryell	compilation of Muse material	
32059	The Man with the Big Front Yard	Yusef Lateef	The Complete Yusef Lateef (Atlantic); Yusef Lateef's Detroit (Atlantic); Hush 'n' Thunder (Atlantic); The Doctor Is in ... and Out (Atlantic)	3CD
32060	Aces Back to Back	Rahsaan Roland Kirk	Left & Right (Atlantic); Rahsaan Rahsaan (Atlantic); Prepare Thyself to Deal with a Miracle (Atlantic); Other Folks Music (Atlantic)	4CD
32061	Jazz for a Rainy Afternoon	Various Artists	compilation	
32062	Willis ... with Pat	Pat Martino & Willis Jackson		
32063	Jazz Standards	Mark Murphy	compilation of Muse material	2CD
32064	Laid Back	Kenny Burrell	compilation of Muse material	
32065	Richie and Richie & Phil	Richie Cole		with Phil Woods
32066	Groove Jammy	Various Artists	compilation	
32067	Greater Than the Sum of His Parts	Eddie Harris	The In Sound (Atlantic 1448); Mean Greens (Atlantic 1453); The Tender Storm (Atlantic 1478); Silver Cycles (Atlantic 1517)	2CD
32100	A Standing Eight	Rahsaan Roland Kirk	The Return of the 5000 Lb. Man (Warner Bros. BS 2918); Kirkatron (Warner Bros. BS 2982); Boogie-Woogie String Along for Real (Warner Bros. BSK 3085)	2CD
32142	Left Hook, Right Cross	Rahsaan Roland Kirk	Volunteered Slavery (Atlantic SD 1534); Blacknuss (Atlantic SD 1601)	
32174	Setting Standards	Woody Shaw	Setting Standards (LP)	Cedar Walton Buster Williams Victor Jones

Source: "32 Jazz: A Checklist"
