= Dog Years in the Fourth Ring =

Compilation album by Rahsaan Roland Kirk
- Released: 1997
- Recorded: October 27, 1963 – July 10, 1975
- Genre: Jazz
- Length: 132:41
- Label: 32 Jazz
- Producer: Joel Dorn

Professional ratings
Review scores
Source	Rating
Allmusic	4.5/5 stars
Entertainment Weekly	B

Dog Years in the Fourth Ring is a compilation album by jazz multi-instrumentalist Rahsaan Roland Kirk featuring 2 CDs of previously unreleased live performances and Kirk's solo album Natural Black Inventions: Root Strata on the third disc. It was released on the 32 Jazz label in 1997.

== Reception ==
The Allmusic review by Thom Jurek states "None of this material is substandard... The blues range is deep on many of these tracks, as is the entertainment value. Kirk was a performer as much as he was a musician, before and after the stroke. His lyric and harmonic sensibilities were deeply embedded in one another, and his way of crossing harmonic strategies was truly singular because it was so unorthodox... Natural Black Inventions: Root Strata is its own classic, and it deserved its own release apart from the package, but listeners will have to take what they can get. For this album alone, this package is worth the price". Writing for JazzTimes Bill Shoemaker noted "With few exceptions, the new material is engaging; heard in tandem with Kirk's daring real-time solo pieces, they flesh out a high-contrast portrait of this singular artist". In Jazz Review Lee Prosser observed "The live cuts from the 60's seem the most anachronistic on this set, being that they align more closely with bebop/hardbop tradition than the majority of the later performances. Still, Rahsaan's own brand of freedom was already exhibited. Indeed, the evolution over this set is from the relative conservatism of the 60's live material to the unique live-in-the-studio recordings of 1971". All About Jazz suggested "Overall, this box is a must for the Rahsaan fan. For the Rahsaan virgin, I'd suggest picking up We Free Kings, or the two-disc set Does Your House Have Lions first. But once you've gained an appreciation of Rahsaan, definitely, definitely pick this up. The gospel awaits all the true believers". Entertainment Weekly said "Kirk juggled musical genres as easily as he did a huge swath of saxophones and flutes, thumbing his nose good-naturedly as he dashed all notions of refinement and constriction".

== Track listing ==
All compositions by Rahsaan Roland Kirk except as indicated.

Disc One:

1. "Box Tops and Whistlin' Rings" (Junior Warren) - 0:19
2. "Domino" (Louis Ferrari, Jacques Plante, Don Raye) - 5:04
3. "Blues for Alice" (Charlie Parker) - 6:18
4. "I Remember Clifford" (Benny Golson) - 3:37
5. "Freddie Freeloader" (Miles Davis) - 6:01
6. "Lester Leaps In" (Lester Young) - 5:32
7. "Sister Sadie" (Horace Silver) - 5:03
8. "One Mind/Seasons" - 4:41
9. "I Say a Little Prayer" (Burt Bacharach, Hal David) - 12:58
- Recorded in Copenhagen, Denmark on October 27, 1963 (track 5), Bremen, Germany, in 1964 (tracks 2–4), Paris, France, in 1972 (track 6 & 8), and Boston, MA on October 31, 1972.

Disc Two:

1. "Jammin' With a Wolf" - 0:25
2. "Three for the Festival" [excerpt] - 3:53
3. "Untitled Blues" - 7:23
4. "Passion Dance" (McCoy Tyner) - 8:09
5. "Petite Fleur" (Sidney Bechet) - 7:34
6. "Giant Steps" (John Coltrane) - 4:13
7. "Misterioso/Blue Monk" [excerpt] (Thelonious Monk) - 1:03
8. "Rahsaantalk" - 0:25
9. "Multi-Horn Medley: Satin Doll/Lover" (Duke Ellington/Richard Rodgers, Lorenz Hart) - 6:18
10. "Blacknuss" - 6:22
- Recorded in Bremen, Germany, in 1964 (track 2), Paris, France, in 1970 (track 5) and 1972 (track 9), unlisted location on April 10, 1972 (track 10), Berlin, Germany, in 1973 (track 4 & 7), Montreux, Switzerland, in 1975 (track 3), and Pori, Finland, on July 10, 1975 (track 6).

Disc Three:

1. "Something for Trane That Trane Could Have Said" - 3:05
2. "Island Cry" - 3:52
3. "Runnin' from the Trash" - 2:12
4. "Day Dream"(Duke Ellington, John Latouche, Billy Strayhorn) - 3:40
5. "The Ragman and the Junkman Ran from the Businessman They Laughed and He Cried" - 3:02
6. "Breath-A-Thon" - 1:55
7. "Rahsaanica" - 3:40
8. "Raped Voices" - 1:54
9. "Haunted Feelings" - 2:25
10. "Prelude Back Home" - 3:44
11. "Dance of the Lobes" - 2:05
12. "Harder and Harder Spiritual" - 2:02
13. "Black Root (Back to the Root)" - 3:17
- Recorded at Regent Sound Studios, NYC, January 26 (tracks 1–3, 5, & 7–12) and February 4 (tracks 4, 6 & 13), 1971

== Personnel ==
- Roland Kirk - tenor saxophone, manzello, stritch, clarinet, flute, black mystery pipes, harmonium, piccolo, bass drum, thundersheet, cymbals, bells, music box, palms, timpani, gong, bird sounds
- Junior Warren - interview (Disc One track 1)
- George Gruntz - piano (Disc One tracks 2–4 & 7, Disc Two track 2)
- Niels-Henning Ørsted Pedersen - bass (Disc One tracks 2–5 & 7, Disc Two track 2 & 6)
- Daniel Humair - drums (Disc One tracks 2–4 & 7, Disc Two track 2)
- Tete Montoliu - piano (Disc One track 5)
- Alex Riel - drums (Disc One track 5)
- Ron Burton - piano (Disc One track 6, 8 & 9, Disc Two tracks 5, 9 & 10)
- Henry "Metathias" Pearson - bass (Disc One track 6, 8 & 9, Disc Two tracks 3–4, 7, 9 & 10)
- Richie Goldberg - drums (Disc One track 6 & 8, Disc Two track 9)
- Joe "Habao" Texidor - percussion, tambourine, triangle, washboard, thundersheet (Disc One track 6 & 8, Disc Two track 5 & 9, Disc Three)
- Robert Shy - drums (Disc One track 9, Disc Two track 10)
- Arthur Perry - percussion (Disc One track 9, Disc Two track 10)
- Hilton Ruiz - electric piano (Disc Two track 3 & 6)
- Todd Barkan - percussion (Disc Two track 3)
- Sonny Brown - drums (Disc Two track 3)
- Donald Smith - piano (Disc Two tracks 4 & 7)
- John Goldsmith - drums (Disc Two tracks 4 & 7)
- Anthony Scott - percussion (Disc Two track 4 & 7)
- Vernon Martin - bass (Disc Two track 5)
- Jerome Cooper - drums (Disc Two track 5)
- Kenny Rogers - baritone saxophone (Disc Two track 7)
- Maurice McKinley - drums (Disc Three)
- Sonelius Smith - piano (Disc Three track 4)
