= Reeds & Deeds =

Studio album by Roland Kirk
- Released: June 1963
- Recorded: February 25 & 26, 1963
- Genre: Jazz
- Label: Mercury

Roland Kirk chronology
| Domino (1962) | Reeds & Deeds (1963) | The Roland Kirk Quartet Meets the Benny Golson Orchestra (1963) |

Reeds & Deeds is a studio album by the jazz multi-instrumentalist Roland Kirk. It was released through Mercury Records in June 1963. It includes performances by Kirk with Virgil Jones, Charles Greenlee, Harold Mabern, Abdullah Rafik, Walter Perkins, Tom McIntosh and Richard Davis, with arrangements by Benny Golson.

Professional ratings
Review scores
| Source | Rating |
|---|---|
| AllMusic | 4.5/5 stars |
| The Encyclopedia of Popular Music | 3/5 stars |

== Track listing ==
All compositions by Roland Kirk except as indicated.

1. "Land of Peace" (Leonard Feather) - 5:52
2. "Lonesome August Child" - 4:33
3. "Limbo Boat" - 3:00
4. "Hay Ro" - 3:02
5. "Waltz of the Friends" - 4:40
6. "This Is Always" (Harry Warren, Mack Gordon) - 4:17
7. "Reeds and Deeds" - 5:18
8. "Song of the Countrymen" - 6:54

- Recorded in New York on February 25 (tracks 1–5) and February 26 (tracks 6–8), 1963

== Personnel ==
- Roland Kirk: tenor saxophone, manzello, stritch, flute, siren
- Virgil Jones: trumpet
- Charles Greenlee: trombone (tracks 1–5)
- Harold Mabern: piano
- Abdullah Rafik: bass (tracks 1–5)
- Walter Perkins: drums
- Tom McIntosh: trombone (tracks 6–8)
- Richard Davis: bass (tracks 6–8)
- Benny Golson: arranger (tracks 6–8)
