= Domino (Rahsaan Roland Kirk album) =

Studio album by Roland Kirk
- Released: November 1962
- Recorded: April 18 & September 6, 1962
- Genre: Jazz
- Length: 50:31
- Label: Mercury, Verve (reissue)
- Producer: Jack Tracy

Roland Kirk chronology
We Free Kings (1962)	Domino (1962)	Reeds & Deeds (1963)

Domino is an album by American jazz saxophonist Roland Kirk, released on Mercury Records in November 1962. It was reissued in 2000 on Verve with bonus tracks featuring sessions with Herbie Hancock. It includes Kirk's tribute to Thelonious Monk and Charles Mingus, "Where Monk and Mingus Live", in a medley with the former's "Let's Call This".

== Reception ==
Professional ratings
Review scores
Source	Rating
AllMusic	4.5/5 stars
The Penguin Guide to Jazz Recordings	3.5/4 stars
The Rolling Stone Album Guide	3/5 stars

The AllMusic review by Lindsay Planer states: "The expanding musical universe of Rahsaan Roland Kirk continues its orbit on Domino. While always true to his exceptional talents, Kirk's previous efforts are somewhat derivative when compared to his later and more aggressive sound. On Domino, the genesis of his more assertive presence is thoroughly evident."

== Track listing ==
1. "Domino" (Don Raye, Jacques Plante, Louis Ferrari) – 3:16
2. "Meeting on Termini's Corner" (Roland Kirk) – 3:41
3. "Time" (Richie Powell) – 3:13
4. "Lament" (J. J. Johnson) – 3:40
5. "A Stritch in Time" (Kirk) – 5:06
6. "3-in-1 Without the Oil (Kirk) – 2:35
7. "Get Out of Town" (Cole Porter) – 4:49
8. "Rolando" (Kirk) – 3:47
9. "I Believe in You" (Frank Loesser) – 4:26
10. "E.D." (Kirk) – 2:36

=== CD bonus tracks ===
1. "Where Monk and Mingus Live"/"Let's Call This" (Kirk)/(Thelonious Monk) – 4:12
2. "Domino" [alternate version] – 4:07
3. "I Didn't Know What Time It Was" (Lorenz Hart, Richard Rodgers) – 3:15
4. "I Didn't Know What Time It Was" – 2:18
5. "I Didn't Know What Time It Was" – 2:21
6. "Someone to Watch Over Me" [breakdown take] (George Gershwin, Ira Gershwin) – 2:37
7. "Someone to Watch Over Me" (G. Gershwin, I. Gershwin) – 3:38
8. "Termini's Corner" (Kirk) – 2:35
9. "Termini's Corner" [breakdown take] – 2:28
10. "Termini's Corner" – 2:45
11. "Termini's Corner" – 4:10
12. "When the Sun Comes Out" (Harold Arlen, Ted Koehler) – 2:48
13. "When the Sun Comes Out" – 2:05
14. "When the Sun Comes Out" – 2:44
15. "Time Races With Emit" [erroneously issued as "Ad Lib"] (Kirk) – 0:22

== Personnel ==
- Roland Kirk - flute, tenor sax, vocals, stritch, manzello, nose flute, siren
- Andrew Hill - piano, celeste (tracks 1–6 of original release)
- Wynton Kelly - piano (tracks 7–10 of original release)
- Herbie Hancock - piano (only on CD bonus tracks)
- Vernon Martin - bass
- Henry Duncan - drums (Tracks 1–6 of original release)
- Roy Haynes - drums (tracks 7–10 of original release, all bonus tracks on CD)
- Jack Tracy - production
