= Shamek Farrah =

American jazz musician

Shamek Farrah is an alto saxophone player, who was featured on many Strata-East Records albums, and released two albums on the label as leader.

Reviewing First Impressions, Allmusic said: "This is the standard spiritually intense new jazz one learns to expect from the label, soaked in some Eastern influences but always with its ear to the street.".

He was born Anthony Domacase in New York City and grew up in Spanish Harlem, a neighborhood he described as “a mixed community of Italians, Hispanics and African Americans.” His father was a mechanical engineer who was friendly with jazz musicians like Sy Oliver and Cab Calloway. He began studying the alto saxophone under Garvin Bushel at age 12. In the late 1960s he began performing with up-and-coming Latin and Latin-jazz groups around the New York area. In the mid-1970s and 80's when live loft jazz was popular in New York City, he performed with his own groups and other prominent jazz musicians such as Sonelius Smith, Rashid Ali, John Stubblefield, Carlos Garnett, and Walter Davis Jr.

In late 1972, at age 25, he signed with Strata-East Records and in 1974 his first jazz album First Impressions was released. In 1977 his second Strata-East Records album, Shamek Farrah/Sonelius Smith-The World Of The Children. In 1979, he signed with RA Records and the album Shamek Farrah And Folks - La Dee La La was released in 1980. Each of those recordings have since been re-released. First Impressions and The World Of The Children were re-released in 1996 on the Japanese record label, Bomba Records and Shamek Farrah And Folks - La Dee La La was re-released in 2002 on the Quadraphonic Sound Modules Records label. His legendary composition "First Impressions" performed on the album of the same name continues to fascinate listeners around the world many years after its inception. In 1992, Soul Jazz Records, a British record label, released the original recording of "First Impression" on a compilation CD "Soul Jazz Loves Strata-East" featuring other Strata-East Records artists as well. In 2006 the British record label Soul Brothers Records re-release "First Impressions" again on a compilation CD "Fusion With Attitude" featuring jazz greats Joe Henderson, Nat Adderley and Walter Bishop Jr. performing on their own selections.

== Discography ==
- 1974: First Impressions (Strata-East Records)
- 1977: The World of the Children (with Sonelius Smith, Strata-East Records)
- 1980: Shamek Farrah And Folks La Dee La La [RA Records]
- 1992: Soul Jazz Loves Strata-East (compilation featuring Shamek Farrah and other Strata-East Records artists, Soul Jazz Records UK)
- 1996 First Impressions and The World Of The Children (re-release of the original Strata-East Records recordings, Bomba Records Japan)
- 2002: Shamek Farrah And Folks La Dee La La (re-release of the original RA Records recording, Quadraphonic Sound Modules Records)
- 2006: Fusion With Attitude (Compilation, Soul Brothers Records UK)
- 2021: Shamek Farrah And Folks La Dee La La (Reissue, Jazz Room Records)
