= Hillhouse, Mississippi =

- Unincorporated community
- Location within Mississippi Location within the United States
- Coordinates: 34°07′32″N 90°45′05″W
- Country: United States
- State: Mississippi
- County: Coahoma
- Elevation: 118 ft (36 m)
- Time zone: UTC-6 (Central (CST))
  - Summer (DST): UTC-5 (CDT)
- ZIP code: 39451
- Area code: 662
- GNIS feature ID: 671223

Hillhouse is an unincorporated community located in Coahoma County, Mississippi, United States. Hillhouse is approximately 3 miles (4.8 km) south of Rena Lara and 16 miles (26 km) north of Gunnison on Mississippi Highway 1. Hillhouse is located on the former Yazoo and Mississippi Valley Railroad and was once home to three general stores. A post office operated under the name Hillhouse from 1890 to 1972.

== Notable person ==
- Sonelius Smith, jazz pianist
