= Body and Soul (David Murray album) =

Studio album by David Murray Quartet
- Released: 1993
- Recorded: February 11 & 12, 1993
- Genre: Jazz
- Length: 51:53
- Label: Black Saint
- Producer: Flavio Bonandrini

Body and Soul is an album by David Murray, released on the Italian Black Saint label in 1993. It features performances by Murray, Sonelius Smith, Wilber Morris, Rashied Ali and Taana Running.

== Reception ==
The AllMusic review by Ron Wynn stated, "No matter how many albums Murray issues, he never coasts or goes through the motions. This is mainly a quartet date, although Murray shows on the title track his ability to back a singer as Taana Running gives a moving vocal, complete with her original lyrics. Otherwise, these are either spirited uptempo numbers or equally energized ballads. Murray's sweeping tenor sound remains a marvel, and few can match him in controlling drive, pitch and volume. Drummer Rashied Ali has not lost the rippling intensity from his days with John Coltrane; he and Murray conclude things in a dazzling duo performance on 'Cuttin' Corners' deliberately intended to evoke memories of the Coltrane/Ali album Interstellar Space."

Professional ratings
Review scores
Source	Rating
AllMusic	4.5/5 stars
The Penguin Guide to Jazz Recordings	4/4 stars

== Track listing ==
1. "Slave Song" (Smith) - 10:15
2. "Celebration Dance" (Smith) - 4:55
3. "Body and Soul (Eyton, Green, Heyman, Sour) - 7:30
4. "Doni's Song" - 7:00
5. "Remembering the Chief of St. Mary's" (For Bob Barrett) - 6:54
6. "Odin" - 8:15
7. "Cuttin' Corners" (Ali) - 7:04

All compositions by David Murray except as indicated
- Recorded at Sear Sound Studios, NYC, February 11 & 12, 1993

== Personnel ==
- David Murray - tenor saxophone
- Sonelius Smith - piano
- Wilber Morris - bass
- Rashied Ali - drums
- Taana Running - vocals
