= Stealing thunder =

Idiom of using someone else's idea for one's own advantage

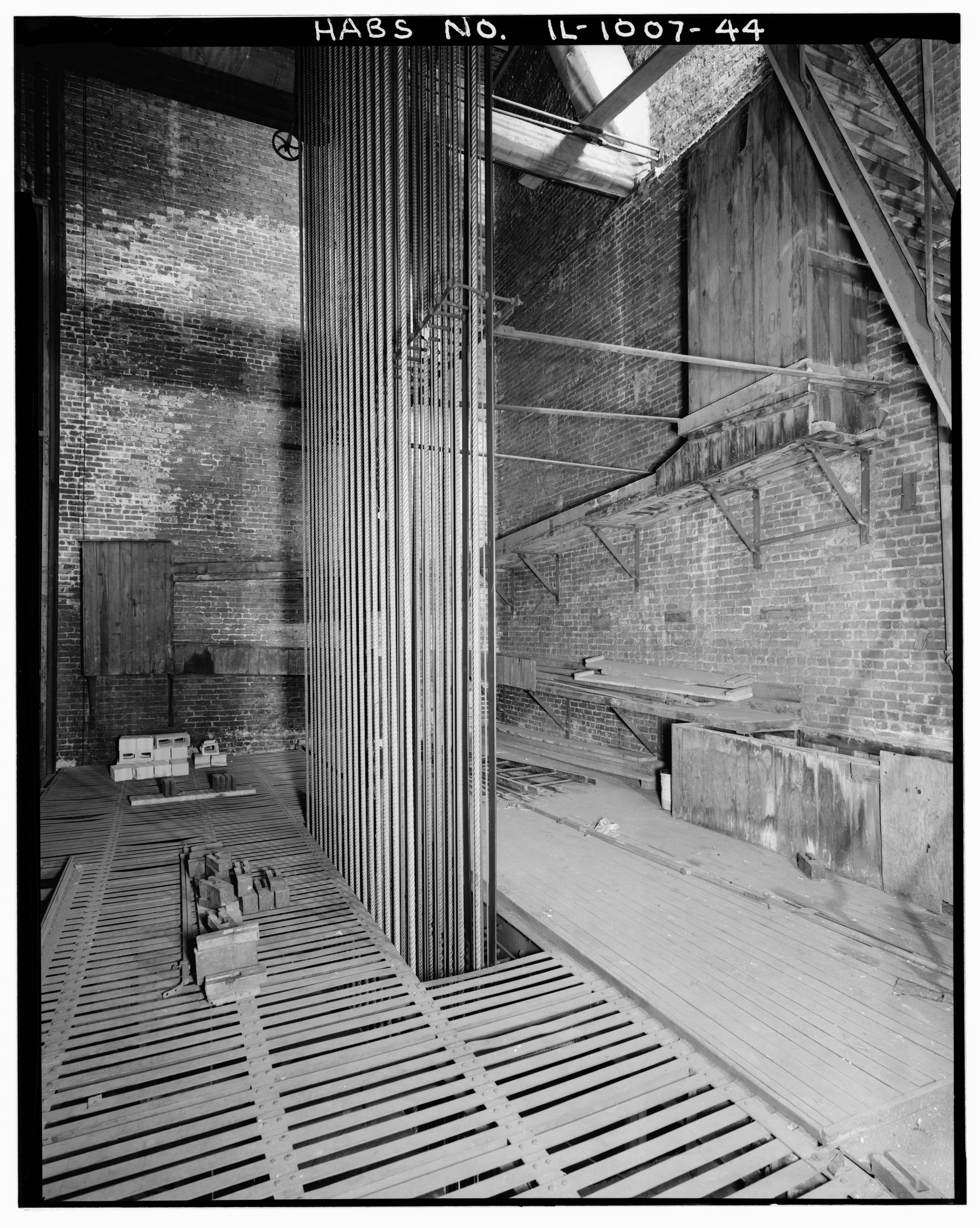
The thunder machine in the Auditorium Theatre. The taking of the idea for such a mechanism is the origin of the concept.

Stealing thunder is to use someone else's idea for one's own advantage, or to pre-empt them.

== Origin ==
The idiom comes from the dramatist John Dennis early in the 18th century, after he had conceived a novel idea for a thunder machine for his unsuccessful 1709 play Appius and Virginia and later found it used at a performance of Macbeth. There is an account of the incident in The Lives of the Poets of Great Britain and Ireland by Robert Shiels and Theophilus Cibber:

Mr Dennis happened once to go to the play, when a tragedy was acted, in which the machinery of thunder was introduced, a new artificial method of producing which he had formerly communicated to the managers. Incensed by this circumstance, he cried out in a transport of resentment, "That is my thunder, by God; the villains will play my thunder, but not my plays."

A more accepted version, written by William Shepard Walsh who quoted Joseph Spence, is that the saying came after a performance of Macbeth:

“Damn them!” he cried, rising in a violent passion, “they will not let my play run, but they steal my thunder!”"

Etymologists have theorized that the phrase may have connected to the stealing of thunder from the Roman god, Jupiter, and that the usage of the saying was common in theater settings before the Dennis attribution. The first noted use of the phrase outside of the theater, in print form and used in the known sense, was traced back to the early 19th century.

== Rhetorical use ==
In a contentious situation, such as a court case, a political debate or a public relations crisis, it is a tactic used to weaken the force of an adverse point. By introducing the point first and being open about it or rebutting it, the force of the opposition's argument is diminished – their thunder is stolen. The opposite strategy, whereby one party discloses information that seems advantageous to the opponent’s case, before the latter elicits or reveals it, to weaken its force, has been termed "stealing sunshine".
