= Dick Griffin =

American jazz trombonist (born 1940)

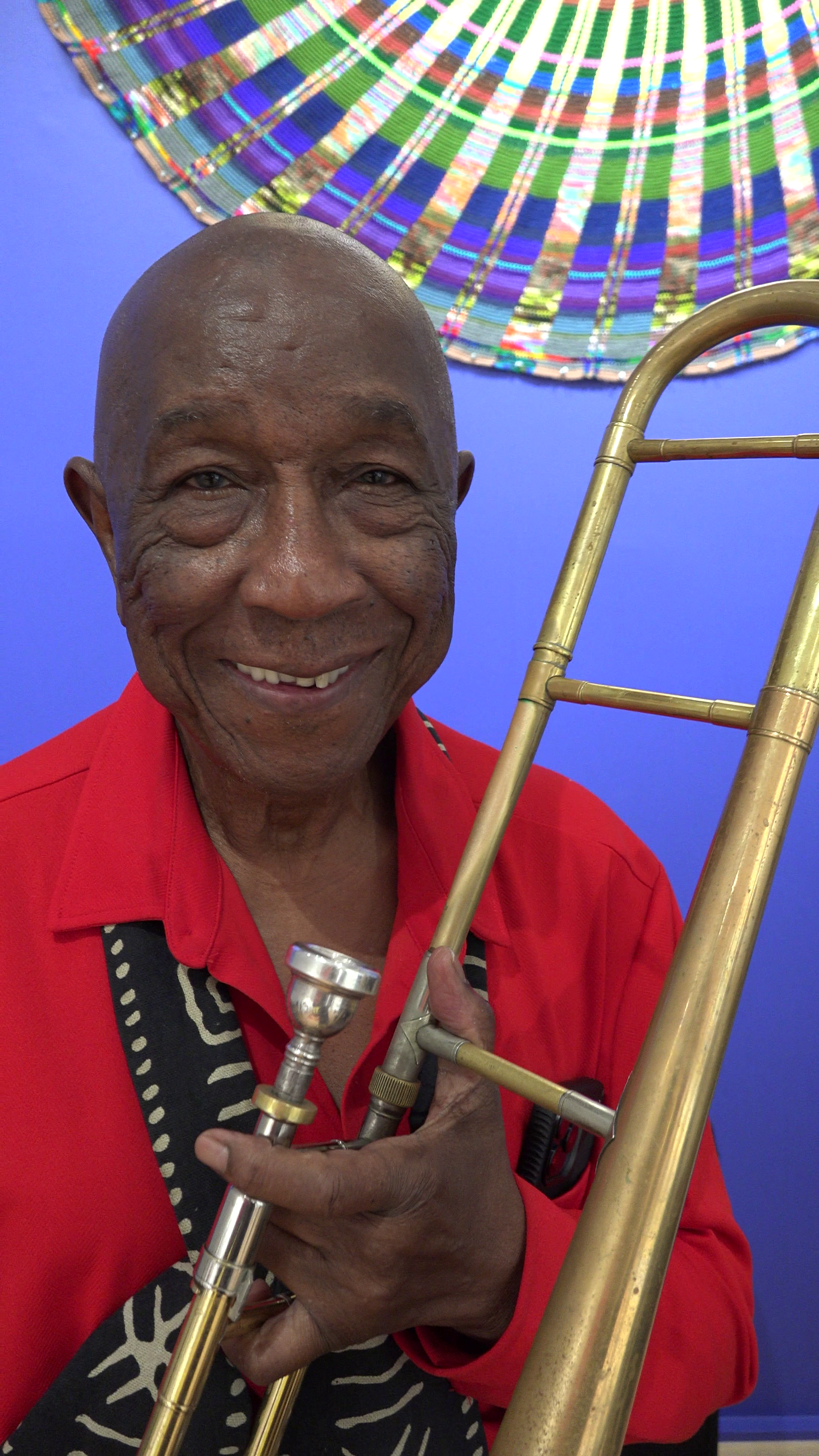

Background information
- Born: James Richard Griffin; January 28, 1940 (age 86); Jackson, Mississippi, U.S.
- Genres: Jazz
- Occupations: Musician, composer, educator, painter
- Instrument: Trombone
- Years active: 1960s–present
- Labels: Strata-East Records, Trident Records, Ruby Records
- Website: https://www.dickgriffin1.com

James "Dick" Richard Griffin (born January 28, 1940, in Jackson, Mississippi) is an American jazz trombonist known for his work on Strata-East Records, and with Rahsaan Roland Kirk and Sun Ra.

As a child he studied piano, soon switching to trombone.

After earning his bachelor's degree in 1963, Griffin began teaching high school while working on his Master's. Griffin is most known for his technique of circular phonics, combining multiphonics with circular breathing. He taught music theory and the history of jazz at Wesleyan University. Later in life, Griffin became an accomplished painter, with showings in New York City and Europe.

A 1995 CD release, The Eighth Wonder & More (Konnex Records) features that album as well as most of the Now is the Time album.

== Discography ==
=== As leader ===
- The Eighth Wonder (Strata-East, 1974)
- Now Is the Time (Trident, 1979)
- A Dream for Rahsaan (Ruby, 1985)
- All Blues (Ruby, 2002)
- Time Will Tell (Ruby, 2011)
- Homage to Sun Ra (Ruby, 2014)
- Live at Tobacco Road, Vol. 1 (Ruby, 2026)
- Live at Tobacco Road, Vol. 2 (Ruby, 2026)
- Live at Tobacco Road, Vol. 3 (Ruby, 2026)

=== As sideman ===
With Abdullah Ibrahim

- Ekaya (Ekapa 1983)
- Water from an Ancient Well (BlackHawk, 1986)
- The Mountain (Kaz, 1989)

With Roland Kirk

- The Inflated Tear (Atlantic, 1968)
- Volunteered Slavery (Atlantic, 1969)
- Left & Right (Atlantic, 1969)
- Rahsaan Rahsaan (Atlantic, 1970)
- Blacknuss (Atlantic, 1972)
- Prepare Thyself to Deal with a Miracle (Atlantic, 1973)

With Sun Ra

- We Travel the Space Ways (Saturn, 1967) - rec. 1961
- Concert For The Comet Kohoutek (ESP-Disk', 1993) - rec. 1973
- What Planet Is This? (Golden Years of New Jazz, 2006)
- Strange Worlds in My Mind (Norton, 2010)

With others

- Muhal Richard Abrams, The Hearinga Suite (Black Saint, 1989)
- Roy Ayers, Fever (Polydor, 1979)
- Billy Bang, Da Bang! (TUM, 2013)
- Harry Belafonte, Paradise in Gazankulu (EMI-Manhattan, 1988)
- George Benson, Body Talk (CTI, 1973)
- Brook Benton, This Is Brook Benton (All Platinum, 1976)
- Solomon Burke, Back to My Roots (Chess, 1976)
- Gloria Coleman, Sings and Swings Organ (Mainstream, 1971)
- Stanley Cowell, Setup (SteepleChase, 1994)
- Hank Crawford, Midnight Ramble (Milestone, 1983)
- Joey DeFrancesco, Where Were You? (Columbia, 1990)
- Bill Dixon, 17 Musicians in Search of a Sound: Darfur (AUM Fidelity, 2008)
- Charles Earland, Intensity (Prestige, 1972)
- Charles Earland, Charles III (Prestige, 1973)
- Frank Foster, The Loud Minority (Mainstream, 1972)
- Lionel Hampton, 90th Birthday Celebration (Sound Hills, 1999)
- Billy Harper, Capra Black (Strata-East, 1973)
- Chuck Jackson, Needing You, Wanting You (All Platinum, 1975)
- Sam Jones, Something New (Interplay, 1979)
- Clifford Jordan, Drink Plenty Water (Harvest Song, 2023) - rec. 1974
- Les McCann, Comment (Atlantic, 1970)
- Jack McDuff, Who Knows What Tomorrow's Gonna Bring? (Blue Note, 1971)
- William Parker, Spontaneous (Splasc(H), 2003)
- Charlie Persip, Charlie Persip and Gerry Lafurn's 17-Piece Superband (Stash, 1981)
- Charlie Persip, Charlie Persip & Superband (Natasha, 1994)
- Esther Phillips, From a Whisper to a Scream (Kudu, 1971)
- Sam Rivers, Jazzbuhne Berlin '82 (Repertoire, 1990)
- Hilton Ruiz, El Camino (Novus, 1988)
- Hilton Ruiz, Strut (Novus, 1989)
- Archie Shepp, Attica Blues Big Band Live at the Palais Des Glaces (Blue Marge, 1979)
- Johnny "Hammond" Smith, The Prophet (Kudu, 1972)
- Leon Thomas, Blues and the Soulful Truth (Flying Dutchman, 1972)
- Charles Tolliver, Music Inc. (Strata-East, 1971)
- McCoy Tyner, Song of the New World (Milestone, 1973)
- McCoy Tyner, Inner Voices (Milestone, 1978)
- Bobby Watson, Estimated Time of Arrival (Roulette, 1978)
