= Sonelius Smith =

American jazz pianist and composer (born 1942)

- Also known as: S. Smith, Sonelius Laurel Smith
- Born: S. L. Smith; December 17, 1942 (age 83); Hillhouse, Mississippi
- Genres: Jazz, Spiritual Jazz, Soul Jazz
- Occupations: Pianist and Composer
- Instrument: Piano
- Years active: 1970-present
- Labels: Soul Note, Strata-East Records
- Member of: The Sonelius Smith Trio
- Formerly of: The New Directions, Jazzmobile, The Piano Choir, The David Murray Quartet, Flight to Sanity, the Lo-Fly Sextet

Sonelius Smith (born December 17, 1942) is known both for his innovative contributions to jazz as composer and pianist and for his collaborations with some of the late twentieth century's greatest jazz musicians.

As a composer, Smith has created work performed by pianists Ahmad Jamal and Stanley Cowell and saxophonists David Murray and Robin Kenyatta. As a jazz pianist, Smith has performed with Charles Mingus, Lionel Hampton and Stanley Cowell, and been a member of several noteworthy musical groups, including the Piano Choir, which The Washington Post described in 2000 as a multi-genre "Masters of the Piano ... [s]et up on nine Steinway pianos in a semicircle with the keys facing the audience [showcasing] the best of three centuries of piano history." In 1977, The New York Times described Smith's performance with Clifford Thornton's jazz quintet as "forcefully inventive." In 1991, AllMusic described the David Murray Big Band album, which Smith recorded as a member of the David Murray Quartet, as "generally brilliant."

Between 1970 and 2001, Smith performed, played or composed the music for some forty-five albums, including one of his own: The World of the Children (1977), originally released by the storied Strata-East Records, but remastered by Pure Pleasure Records Ltd. in 2021. In a review of the remastered edition, Robbie Gerson of the UK's Audiophile Audition praised its "aspirational soul, free jazz and lyrical expression" and "Smith (the composer) [for] shin[ing] on acoustic piano with a complicated, transcendental improvisation ... incorporat[ing] both Latin and African patterns," which he described as "captivating," noting that "[a]nother Smith composition (“Conversation Piece”) captures the opposing earthy and graceful abstraction."

In 2005, Smith's collaboration with Shamek Farrah on "Julius" was included in Mastercuts Breaks, a compilation released by Mastercuts that also featured Earth, Wind & Fire, James Brown and Nina Simone.

== Jazz pianist and composer ==
Born in Hillhouse, Mississippi, Smith learned to play piano by ear. In 1948, after his family relocated to Memphis, he began receiving classical training, which later won him a music scholarship to the historically Black university now known as the University of Arkansas at Pine Bluff, but then known as the Arkansas Agricultural, Mechanical and Normal College. In college, Smith played in a small ensemble, and studied piano and theory with Josephus Robinson and John Stubblefield. In 1969, he graduated with a major in music education. After graduation, Smith began touring Europe with The New Directions, which featured Stubblefield and musicians James Leary, Larry Ross and Benjamin Jones.

Smith relocated to New York City at the end of 1969, and began working with Rashid Ali's Jazzmobile jazz quartet. That led to his arrangements and compositions for singer, songwriter and music producer Bob Crewe's Saturday Music company. A year-long tour with Rahsaan Roland Kirk followed, as did collaborations with Kirk on the studio album Blacknuss, the live album Rahsaan Rahsaan and Natural Black Inventions: Root Strata, a second studio album.

In 1973, Smith joined jazz pianist Stanley Cowell's ensemble. In the mid-1970s, he worked with Shamek Farrah and Flight to Sanity. In 1974, he served as musical director for Nancy Fales' Ark, directed by Ralph Lee at La MaMa Experimental Theatre Club in New York City's East Village. Toward the end of the 1970s, he played with J.R. Mitchell, Kalaparusha Maurice McIntyre, Warren Smith, and Wilber Morris.

In the 1980s, Smith worked with Andrew Cyrille and joined David Murray's quartet. Throughout a long musical career, Smith also collaborated with Kenny Dorham, Roy Brooks, Charles Mingus, Roland Kirk, Robin Kenyatta, Rashied Ali, Warren Smith, Frank Foster, Harold Vick, Donald Byrd, Elvin Jones, Archie Shepp, Freddie Hubbard, Art Blakey and Lionel Hampton. As founder of the eponymous Sonelius Smith Trio, Smith collaborates with bass player Adam Kahan and baritone saxophonist Claire Daly.

== Music educator ==
Between 1973 and 1986, Smith worked as an educator for the New Muse Community Museum. In the 1990s, he also began working for The Harlem School of the Arts, in addition to teaching at the Third Street Music School Settlement.

== Discography ==
Year	Credits	Album	Musical Artists
1970	celesta, piano	Rahsaan Rahsaan [live]	Rahsaan Roland Kirk & The Vibration Society
1971	piano	Natural Black Inventions: Root Strata	Rahsaan Roland Kirk
1972	piano	Blacknuss	Rahsaan Roland Kirk
1973	performer	Handscapes [live]	The Piano Choir
1974	piano	First Impressions	Shamek Farrah
1974	piano	Stompin' at the Savoy	Robin Kenyatta
1975	piano, electric piano, featured, composer	Handscapes 2	The Piano Choir
1977	piano	The World of the Children	Shamek Farrah & Sonelius Smith
1977	piano	Wildflowers 2: The New York Loft Jazz Sessions	Various
1980	vocals, piano	La Dee La La	Shamek Farrah and Folks
1980	piano, composer	Live	J.R. Mitchell
1982	composer	Prime Time	Hugh Lawson
1983	piano	The Navigator	Andrew Cyrille
1991	piano	David Murray Big Band	David Murray Quartet
1993	piano	Body and Soul	David Murray Quartet
1994	piano	Strata-East	Various
1994	composer	Summit Conference	Reggie Workman
1995	piano, arranger	South of the Border	David Murray
1997	piano	Dog Years in the Fourth Ring [compilation]	Rahsaan Roland Kirk
1997	piano	Strata-2-East	Various
1998	piano	Comraderie	Zusaan Kali Fasteau
2000	piano	Wildflowers: The New York Loft Jazz Sessions - Complete	Various
2001	composer	No One in Particular	Rashied Ali Quintet
2020	piano	Let's Make Ends Meet	Tee Holman Sextet
