= The Comical Gallant =

Play by John Dennis

- Original language: English
- Written by: John Dennis
- Genre: Comedy

Premiere
- Date: December 1701
- Place: Theatre Royal, Drury Lane, London

The Comical Gallant is a 1701 comedy play by the English writer John Dennis. Also known by the longer title The Comical Gallant: Or the Amours of Sir John Falstaffe, it is a reworking of Shakespeare's play The Merry Wives of Windsor. The epilogue was written by William Burnaby.

== Bibliography ==
- Burling, William J. A Checklist of New Plays and Entertainments on the London Stage, 1700-1737. Fairleigh Dickinson Univ Press, 1992.
