= Appius and Virginia (1709 play) =

1709 tragedy play by John Dennis

- Original language: English
- Written by: John Dennis
- Genre: Comedy

Premiere
- Date: 5 February 1709
- Place: Theatre Royal, Drury Lane

Appius and Virginia is a 1709 tragedy by the British writer John Dennis. It was a distinct reworking by Dennis of an older play of the same title by John Webster. It was not a particular success on its debut. It became best known for Dennis' use of an innovative new technique to imitate the sound of thunder. When Dennis' play was taken off and a revival of Macbeth put on, he was angered when he attended a performance and discovered they were using his thunder machine, reportedly exclaiming "they will not let my play run, and yet they steal my thunder". This gave rise to the expression "stealing thunder".

The original Drury Lane cast included Barton Booth as Appius, Theophilus Keene as Claudius, Thomas Betterton as Virginius, Robert Wilks as Icilius, Benjamin Husband as Valerius, Thomas Smith as Numitorious, Jane Rogers as Virginia, Frances Maria Knight as Cornelia.

== Bibliography ==
- Burling, William J. A Checklist of New Plays and Entertainments on the London Stage, 1700-1737. Fairleigh Dickinson Univ Press, 1992.
- Garrison, Webb. 445 Fascinating Word Origins. Galahad Books, 2001.
- Law, Jonathan. The Methuen Drama Dictionary of the Theatre. A&C Black, 2013.
- Nicoll, Allardyce. History of English Drama, 1660-1900, Volume 2. Cambridge University Press, 2009.
- Van Lennep, W. The London Stage, 1660-1800: Volume Two, 1700-1729. Southern Illinois University Press, 1960.
