= The Inflated Tear =

Studio album by Roland Kirk
- Released: June 14, 1968
- Recorded: November 27–30, 1967
- Studio: Webster Hall, New York City
- Genre: Jazz
- Length: 37:43
- Label: Atlantic
- Producer: Joel Dorn

Roland Kirk chronology
Now Please Don't You Cry, Beautiful Edith (1967)	The Inflated Tear (1968)	Left & Right (1968)

Professional ratings
Review scores
Source	Rating
AllMusic	5/5 stars
The Encyclopedia of Popular Music	5/5 stars
The Penguin Guide to Jazz Recordings	3.5/4 stars

The Inflated Tear is a studio album by Roland Kirk, released on Atlantic in 1968. It was re-released in 1998 by Rhino featuring a bonus track and extensive liner notes. In 2017, Pitchfork placed it at number 170 on its list of the "200 Best Albums of the 1960s".

== Track listing ==
All tracks are written by Roland Kirk, except where noted.

No.	Title	Writer(s)	Length
1.	"The Black and Crazy Blues"		6:07
2.	"A Laugh for Rory"		2:54
3.	"Many Blessings"		4:45
4.	"Fingers in the Wind"		4:18
5.	"The Inflated Tear"		4:58
6.	"Creole Love Call"	Duke Ellington	3:53
7.	"A Handful of Fives"		2:42
8.	"Fly by Night"		4:19
9.	"Lovellevelliloqui"		4:17

CD edition bonus track
No.	Title	Writer(s)	Length
10.	"I'm Glad There Is You"	Jimmy Dorsey, Paul Mertz	2:12

== Personnel ==
- Roland Kirk – tenor saxophone, manzello, stritch, clarinet, flute, whistle, cor anglais, flexatone
- Rahn Burton – piano
- Steve Novosel – bass
- Jimmy Hopps – drums
- Dick Griffin (incorrectly credited on the LP sleeve as Dick Griffith) – trombone (on "Fly by Night")

== Charts ==
Chart	Peak position
US Jazz Albums (Billboard)	19
