= John Dennis (dramatist) =

English critic and dramatist (1657–1734)

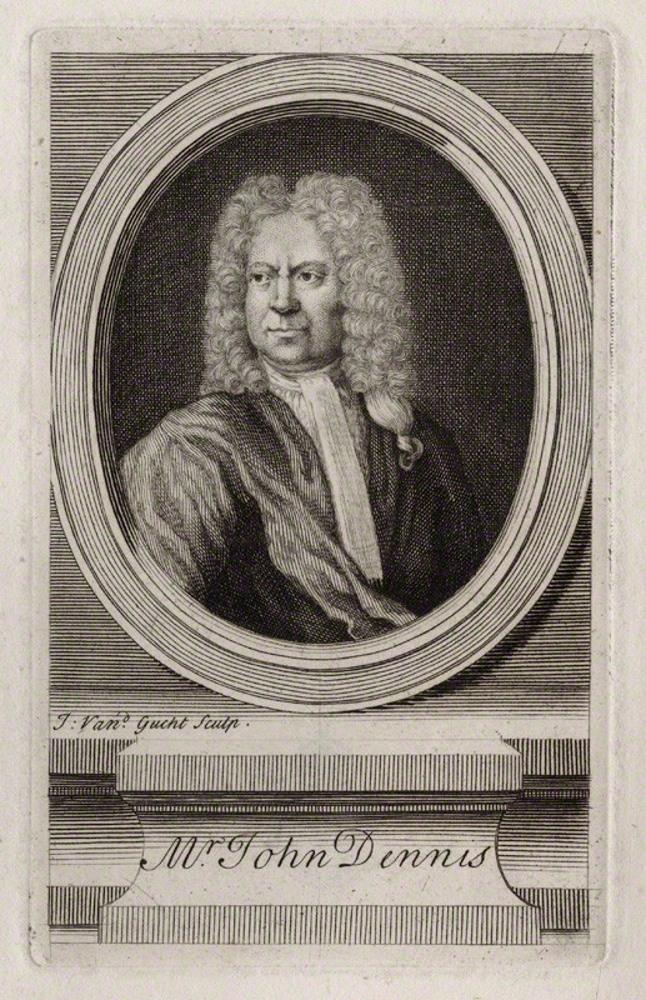
1734 engraving of Dennis

John Dennis (16 September 1657 – 6 January 1734) was an English critic and dramatist. He is credited with inventing the phrase "steal someone’s thunder".

== Life ==
He was born in the parish of St Andrew Holborn, London, in 1657. He was educated at Harrow School and Caius College, Cambridge, where he took his B.A. degree in 1679. In the next year he was fined and dismissed from his college for having wounded a fellow student with a sword. He was, however, received at Trinity Hall, where he took his M.A. degree in 1683.

After travelling in France and Italy, he settled in London, where he became acquainted with Dryden, and close to Wycherley, Congreve and the leading literary figures of his day; and being made temporarily independent by inheriting a small fortune, he devoted himself to literature. The Duke of Marlborough procured him a place as one of the queen's waiters in the customs with a salary of £20 a year. This he afterwards disposed of for a small sum, retaining, at the suggestion of Lord Halifax, a yearly charge upon it for a long term of years. In the years prior to 1704 he reigned as one of the leading coffee house wits alongside Congreve.

One of his tragedies, a violent attack on the French in harmony with popular prejudice, entitled Liberty Asserted, was produced with great success at Lincoln's Inn Fields in 1704. For Appius and Virginia (1709), he invented a new technique for imitating thunder, known as Thunder sheets. The play was not a success and the management of the Drury Lane Theatre withdrew it. But later at a performance of Macbeth there Dennis found the thunder produced by his method and said, "That is my thunder, by God; the villains will play my thunder, but not my play." According to Brewer's entry (under the headword thunder), this is the origin of the phrase, "to steal one's thunder".

Dennis is best remembered as the leading critic of his generation, and as a pioneer of the concept of the sublime as an aesthetic quality. After taking the Grand Tour of the Alps he published his comments in a journal letter published as Miscellanies in 1693, giving an account of crossing the Alps where, contrary to his prior feelings for the beauty of nature as a "delight that is consistent with reason", the experience of the journey was at once a "pleasure to the eye as music is to the ear", but "mingled with Horrours, and sometimes almost with despair." The significance of his account is that the concept of the sublime, at the time a rhetoric term primarily relevant to literary criticism, was used to describe a positive appreciation for horror and terror in aesthetic experience, in contrast to Ashley Cooper, The Third Earl of Shaftesbury's more timid response to the sublime.

Dennis appears to have reached a turning point in 1704, when, at the age of 47 he withdrew from city life. In the years following this he appears to have become increasingly marginalised, both from new developments in cultural life, and from a new generation on the literary scene. His Essay on Italian Opera in 1706 argues that the introspection encouraged by the sensuality of music, but particularly Italian opera, is harmful to public spirit at a time of war. In 1711 he fell out with both Joseph Addison and Alexander Pope.

Samuel Johnson regarded Pope as the instigator of the latter dispute, his Essay on Criticism published mid-May 1711, having "attacked [Dennis, characterised as Appius] wantonly", and provoking Dennis' Reflections Critical and Satirical upon a late Rhapsody Called, an Essay upon Criticism, the following month. Dennis' forensic skills as a critic enabled him to critique the flaws in the far younger poet's observations, intended to show "that as there is a great deal of venom in this little gentleman's temper, nature has very wisely corrected it with a great deal of dullness … as there is no creature in nature so venomous, there is nothing so stupid and so impotent as a hunch-back'd toad; and a man must be very quiet and very passive, and stand still to let him fasten his teeth and his claws, or to be supriz'd sleeping by him, before that animal can have any power to hurt him." Lacerating pamphlets followed on both sides, culminating in Pope's Dunciad, and in a scathing note in the edition of 1729 (Book I, 1, 106), which included an insulting epigram attributed to Richard Savage, but now generally ascribed to Pope himself.

Dennis had fallen out with Addison in April 1711, over an essay that contained a good-humoured rejection of the notion of poetic justice in The Spectator, No. 40. His analysis of Addison's highly successful patriotic tragedy in the Remarks upon Cato (1713) returned to this subject, and while Dennis' motivation may have been partly personally motivated, his criticism remains acute and sensible, and is quoted at considerable length by Johnson in his Life of Addison.

According to Thomas Macaulay (Life and Writings of Addison, p. 215) Pope seized the opportunity to respond on Addison's behalf "venting his malice under the show of friendship", with The Narrative of Dr. Robert Norris, concerning the strange and deplorable frenzy of John Dennis ... (1713). The pamphlet was full of personal abuse, exposing Dennis's foibles, but offered no defence of Cato, and Addison repudiated any connivance in this attack, and indirectly notified Dennis that when he did answer his objections, it would be without personalities.

However, Dennis's day as a leading figure on the London literary scene was over. He gained the nickname of "Furius", while his enthusiasm for the terrible sublime was mocked. The apocryphal tale regarding his petitioning the Duke of Marlborough to have a special clause inserted in the Treaty of Utrecht to secure him from French vengeance, if true, suggests growing paranoia. (Marlborough joked that although he had been a still greater enemy of the French nation, he had no fear for his own security!)

Dennis outlived his annuity from the customs, and his last years were spent in great poverty. Bishop Atterbury sent him money, and he received a small sum annually from Sir Robert Walpole. A benefit performance was organised at the Haymarket (18 December 1733) on his behalf, for which Pope wrote an ill-natured prologue, which the actor and sentimental playwright Colley Cibber (another victim of Pope's invective) recited. Dennis died within three weeks of this performance, on 6 January 1734.

Dennis' works were published in 1702, Select Works (2 volumes) in 1718, and Miscellaneous Tracts, the first volume only of which appeared, in 1727. Although Johnson was to call for a complete edition of Dennis' works, this was not undertaken until 1938.

For a contemporary account of Dennis see Theophilus Cibber's Lives of the Poets, Volume 4; for a nineteenth-century view see Isaac Disraeli's essays on Pope and Addison in the Quarrels of Authors, and On the Influence of a Bad Temper in Criticism in Calamities of Authors; for a contemporary account see the Preface and Introduction to Edward Niles Hooker's The Critical Works of John Dennis.

== Works ==
=== Major essays ===
- Remarks ... (1696), on Blackmore's epic of Prince Arthur.
- Letters upon Several Occasions written by and between Mr. Dryden, Mr. Wycherley, Mr. Moyle, Mr. Congreve and Mr Dennis, published by Mr Dennis (1696).
- two pamphlets in reply to Jeremy Collier's Short View of the Immorality and Profaneness of the English Stage.
- The Advancement and Reformation of Modern Poetry (1701), perhaps his most important work.
- The Grounds of Criticism in Poetry (1704), in which he argued that the ancients owed their superiority over the moderns in poetry to their religious attitude.
- Essay on the Operas after the Italian Manner (1706).
- Essay upon Publick Spirit (1711), in which he inveighs against luxury, and servile imitation of foreign fashions and customs.
- Essay on the Genius and Writings of Shakespeare in Three Letters (1712).

=== Dramatic works ===
- A Plot and No Plot (1697)
- Rinaldo and Armida (1698)
- Iphigenia (1700)
- The Comical Gallant (1702) (adaptation of The Merry Wives of Windsor)
- Liberty Asserted (1704)
- Gibraltar (1705)
- Orpheus and Eurydice (1707)
- Appius and Virginia (1709)
- The Invader of His Country (1719) (adaptation of Coriolanus)
