= The Merry Wives of Windsor =

Play by William Shakespeare

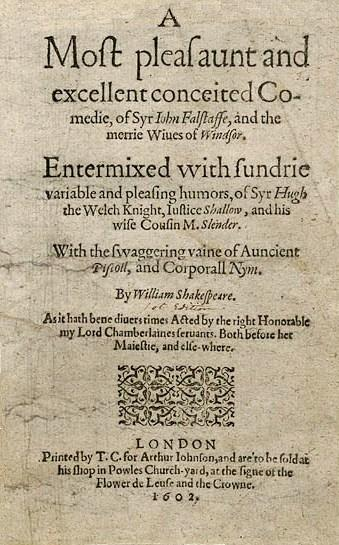
- The title page of the 1602 edition: A most pleasant and excellent conceited comedy, of Sir John Falstaff, and the merry Wives of Windsor. Entermixed with the sundry variable and pleasing humours of Sir Hugh the Welsh knight, Justice Shallow and his wise Cousin M. Slender. With the swaggering vaine of ancient Pistoll, and corporal Nym.

The Merry Wives of Windsor or Sir John Falstaff and the Merry Wives of Windsor is a comedy by William Shakespeare first published in 1602, though believed to have been written in or before 1597. The Windsor of the play's title is a reference to the town of Windsor, the location of Windsor Castle, in Berkshire, England. Though nominally set in the reign of Henry IV or early in the reign of Henry V, the play makes no pretense to exist outside contemporary Elizabethan-era English middle-class life. It features the character Sir John Falstaff, the fat knight who had previously been featured in Henry IV, Part 1 and Part 2. Tradition has it that The Merry Wives of Windsor was written at the request of Queen Elizabeth I, who watching Henry IV, Part 1, is said to have asked Shakespeare to write a play depicting Falstaff in love. Among literary critics, the play is one of Shakespeare's lesser-regarded works. It has been adapted for the opera at least ten times.

== Characters ==
- Sir John Falstaff
- Bardolph, Pistol, Nym – followers of Falstaff.
- Robin – page to Falstaff.
- Messr. Frank Ford gentleman of Windsor
- Mistress Alice Ford, wife of Frank Ford
- George (Thomas) Page –gentlemen of Windsor
- Mistress Margaret Page, wife of Page
- Anne Page, daughter of Mistress Page
- William Page, a boy, Pages' son
- Sir Hugh Evans – a Welsh parson
- Doctor Caius – a French physician.
- John Rugby – a servant to Doctor Caius.
- Mistress Quickly – servant to Doctor Caius.
- Robert Shallow – a Country Justice.
- Abraham Slender – cousin to Shallow.
- Peter Simple – servant to Slender.
- Fenton – a young gentleman.
- The Host of the Garter Inn

== Plot ==
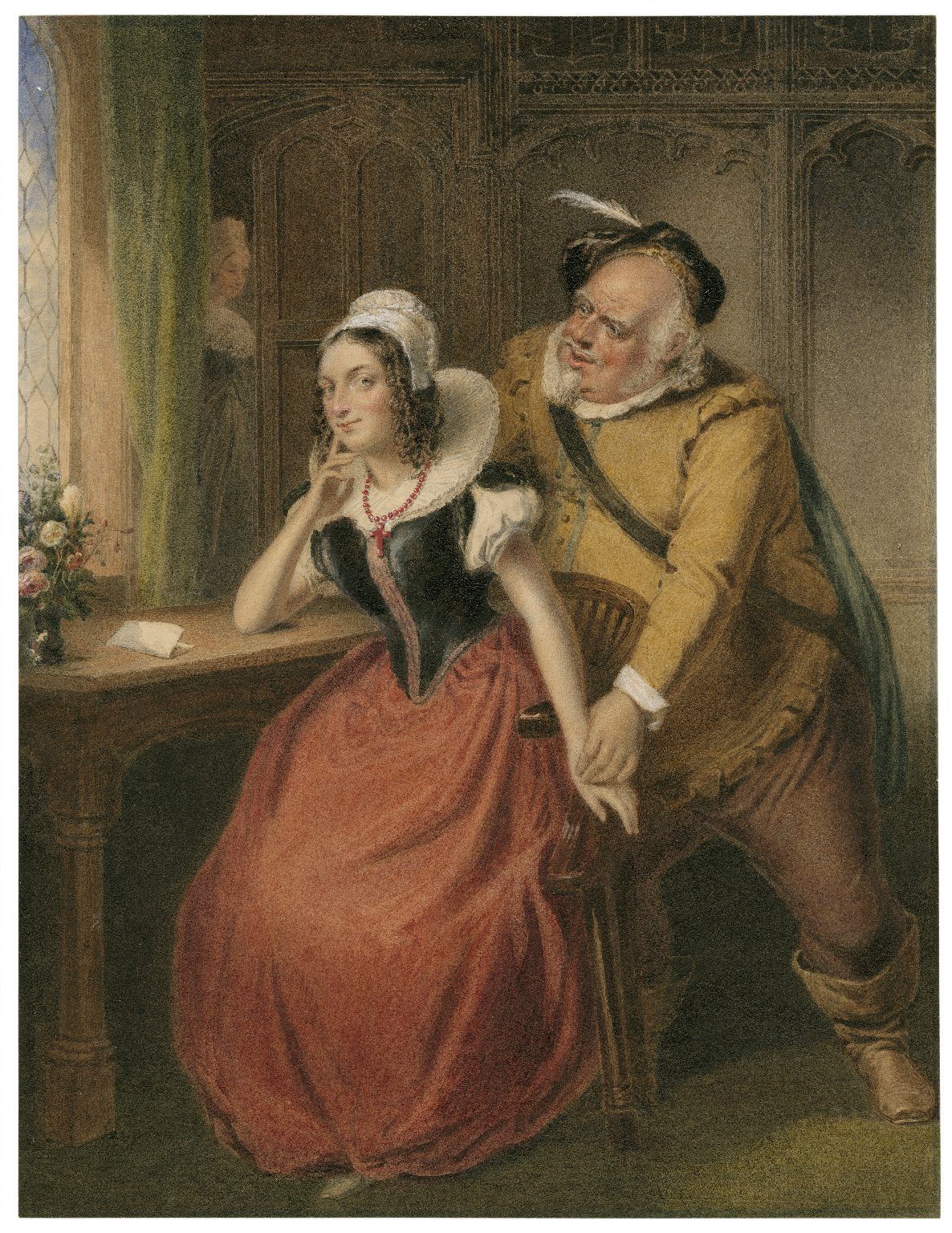
A watercolour of Act III, Scene iii: Falstaff wooing Mistress Ford.

The play is nominally set in the early 15th century, during the same period as the Henry IV plays featuring Falstaff, but there is only one brief reference to this period, a line in which the character Fenton is said to have been one of Prince Hal's rowdy friends (he "kept company with the wild prince and Poins"). In all other respects, the play implies a contemporary setting of the Elizabethan era, c. 1600.

Falstaff arrives in Windsor very short of money. He decides that, to obtain financial advantage, he will court two wealthy married women, Mistress Ford and Mistress Page. Falstaff decides to send the women identical love letters and asks his servants – Pistol and Nym – to deliver them to the wives. When they refuse, Falstaff sacks them, and, in revenge, the men tell the husbands Ford and Page of Falstaff's intentions. Page is not concerned, but the jealous Ford persuades the Host of the Garter Inn to introduce him to Falstaff as a 'Master Brook' so that he can find out Falstaff's plans.

Meanwhile, three different men are trying to win the hand of Page's daughter, Anne Page. Mistress Page would like her daughter to marry Doctor Caius, a French physician, whereas the girl's father would like her to marry Master Slender. Anne herself is in love with Master Fenton, but Page had previously rejected Fenton as a suitor due to his having squandered his considerable fortune on high-class living. Hugh Evans, a Welsh parson, tries to enlist the help of Mistress Quickly (servant to Doctor Caius) in wooing Anne for Slender, but the doctor discovers this and challenges Evans to a duel. The Host of the Garter Inn prevents this duel by telling each man a different meeting place, causing much amusement for himself, Justice Shallow, Page and others. Evans and Caius decide to work together to be revenged on the Host.

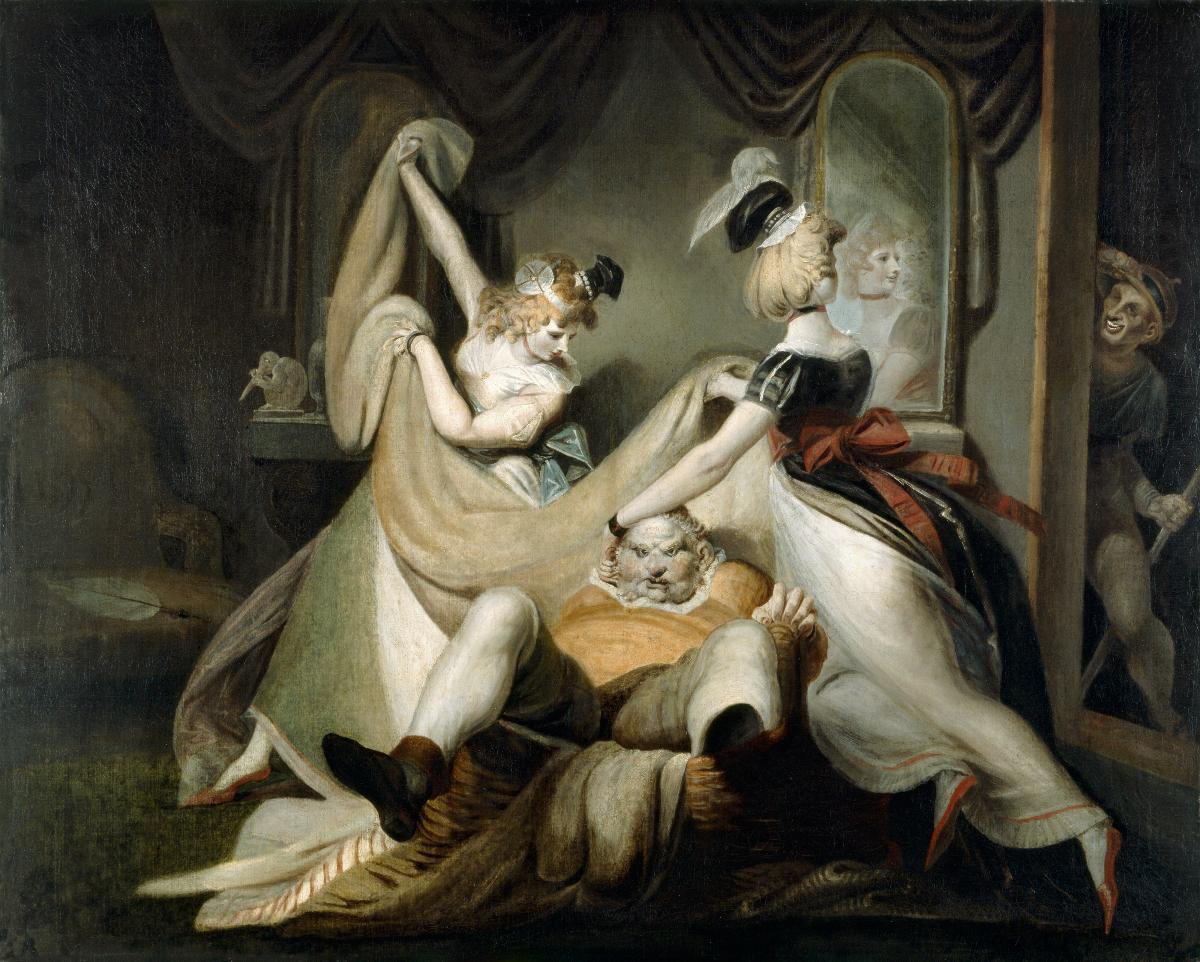
Falstaff in the Laundry Basket by Henry Fuseli, 1792

When the women receive the letters, each goes to tell the other, and they quickly find that the letters are almost identical. The "merry wives" are not interested in the ageing, overweight Falstaff as a suitor; however, for the sake of their own amusement and to gain revenge for his indecent assumptions towards them both, they pretend to respond to his advances.

This all results in great embarrassment for Falstaff. Mr. Ford poses as 'Mr. Brook' and says he is in love with Mistress Ford but cannot woo her as she is too virtuous. He offers to pay Falstaff to court her, saying that once she has lost her honour he will be able to tempt her himself. Falstaff cannot believe his luck, and tells 'Brook' he has already arranged to meet Mistress Ford while her husband is out. Falstaff leaves to keep his appointment and Ford soliloquizes that he is right to suspect his wife and that the trusting Page is a fool.

When Falstaff arrives to meet Mistress Ford, the merry wives trick him into hiding in a laundry basket ("buck basket") full of filthy, smelly clothes awaiting laundering. When the jealous Ford returns to try and catch his wife with the knight, the wives have the basket taken away and the contents (including Falstaff) dumped into the river. Although this affects Falstaff's pride, his ego is surprisingly resilient. He is convinced that the wives are just "playing hard to get" with him, so he continues his pursuit of sexual advancement, with its attendant capital and opportunities for blackmail.

Again Falstaff goes to meet the women but Mistress Page comes back and warns Mistress Ford of her husband's approach again. They try to think of ways to hide him other than the laundry basket which he refuses to get into again. They trick him again, this time into disguising himself as Mistress Ford's maid's obese aunt, known as "the fat woman of Brentford". Ford tries once again to catch his wife with the knight but ends up hitting the "old woman", whom he despises and takes for a witch, and throwing her out of his house. Having been beaten "into all the colours of the rainbow", Falstaff laments his bad luck.

Eventually the wives tell their husbands about the series of jokes they have played on Falstaff, and together they devise one last trick which ends up with the Knight being humiliated in front of the whole town. They tell Falstaff to dress as "Herne, the Hunter" and meet them by an old oak tree in Windsor Forest (now part of Windsor Great Park). They then dress several of the local children, including Anne and William Page, as fairies and get them to pinch and burn Falstaff to punish him. Page plots to dress Anne in white and tells Slender to steal her away and marry her during the revels. Mistress Page and Doctor Caius arrange to do the same, but they arrange Anne shall be dressed in green. Anne tells Fenton this, and he and the Host arrange for Anne and Fenton to be married instead.

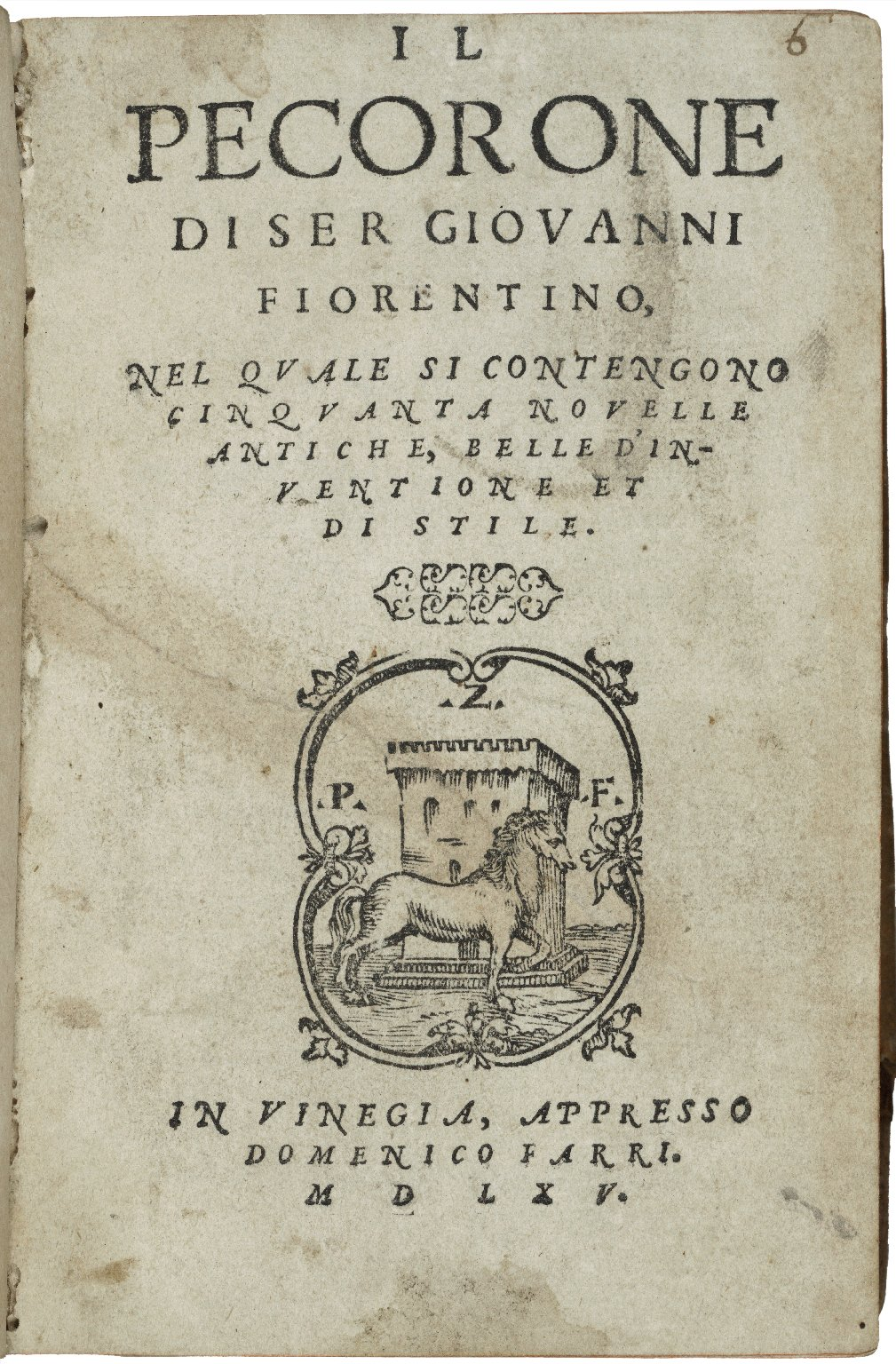
The title page from a 1565 printing of Giovanni Fiorentino's 14th century tale, Il Pecorone.

The wives meet Falstaff, and almost immediately the "fairies" attack. Slender, Caius, and Fenton steal away their brides-to-be during the chaos, and the rest of the characters reveal their true identities to Falstaff.

Although he is embarrassed, Falstaff takes the joke surprisingly well, as he sees it was what he deserved. Ford says he must pay back the 20 pounds 'Brook' gave him and takes the Knight's horses as recompense. Slender suddenly appears and says he has been deceived – the 'girl' he took away to marry was not Anne but a young boy. Caius arrives with similar news – however, he has actually married his boy. Fenton and Anne arrive and admit that they love each other and have been married. Fenton chides the parents for trying to force Anne to marry men she did not love and the parents accept the marriage and congratulate the young pair. Eventually they all leave together and Mistress Page even invites Falstaff to come with them: "let us every one go home, and laugh this sport o'er by a country fire; Sir John and all".

== Sources ==
Some elements of The Merry Wives of Windsor may have been adapted from Il Pecorone, a collection of stories by Ser Giovanni Fiorentino; one of these stories was included in William Painter's The Palace of Pleasure.

== Date and text ==
The play's date of composition is unknown; it was registered for publication in 1602, but was probably several years old by that date. In the Fairy pageant in Act 5 Scene 5 (lines 54–75), Mistress Quickly, as the Queen of the Fairies, gives a long speech giving an elaborate description of the Order of the Garter. The play also alludes to a German duke, who is generally thought to be Frederick I, Duke of Württemberg, who had visited England in 1592 and was elected to the Order of the Garter in 1597 (but was eventually only installed in Stuttgart on 6 November 1603). These facts led commentators starting with Edmond Malone in 1790 to suggest that the play was written and performed for the Order of the Garter festival. William Green suggests that the play was drawn up when George Carey, 2nd Baron Hunsdon, as Lord Chamberlain and patron of Shakespeare's company, was elected Order of the Garter in April 1597. If this is so, it was probably performed when Elizabeth I attended Garter Feast on 23 April.

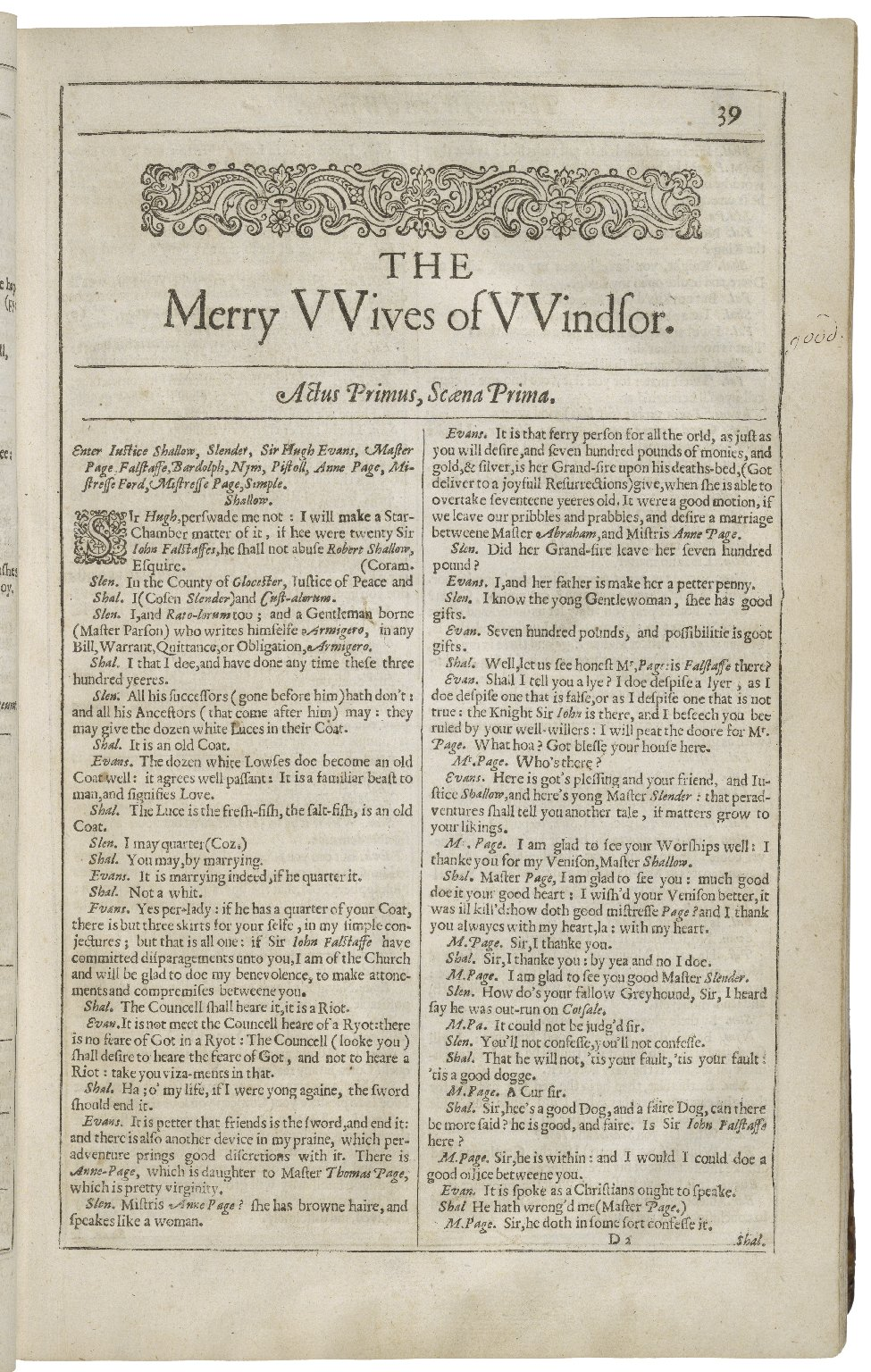
The first page of The Merry Wives of Windsor, printed in the Second Folio of 1632

The Garter theory is only speculation, but it is consistent with a story first recorded by John Dennis in 1702 and Nicholas Rowe in 1709: that Shakespeare was commanded to write the play by Queen Elizabeth, who wanted to see Falstaff in love. This theatrical tradition was first recorded by Dennis in the prologue to his adaptation of the play, The Comical Gallant. He states that Queen Elizabeth "commanded it to be finished in fourteen days." Rowe wrote that Elizabeth "was so well pleased with that admirable character of Falstaff, in the two parts of Henry the Fourth, that she commanded him to continue it for one play more, and to shew him in love." T. W. Craik suggests that these stories may simply be fantasies occasioned by the Quarto's title page which says of the play "As it hath diuers times Acted...Both before her Maiestie, and else-where." Nevertheless, Carey would have been well placed to pass on the queen's wishes to his players, which could account for the tradition.

Support for the Garter theory is divided. If it is correct, it would probably mean that Shakespeare wrote The Merry Wives of Windsor between Henry IV, Part 1 and Part 2. Critics have trouble believing this for several reasons. One is that Pistol and Shallow are introduced as new characters in Henry IV, Part 2, but in The Merry Wives their connection to Falstaff is taken for granted. Also, there are no references to any of the major events from Falstaff's 15th-century exploits from the history plays, such as the rebellion (Henry IV, Part 1 & 2), in Merry Wives. T.W. Craik suggests that Shakespeare was forced to interrupt work on Henry IV, Part 2, having written most of it, because The Merry Wives had to be completed quickly. Another possible explanation comes from the epilogue to Henry IV, Part 2, which promises to "continue the story, with Sir John in it". Sir John does not appear in Henry V, so Merry Wives could have been written to make good on the pledge.

At least parts of the play may have been written around or before the first performances of Part 1 in 1597, after which controversy over the original naming of Falstaff (he was originally the historic Sir John Oldcastle, which presumably did not please Oldcastle's descendants) forced Shakespeare to rename the character. It appears that the joke in V,v,85–90 is that Oldcastle/Falstaff incriminates himself by calling out the first letter of his name, "O, O, O!," when his fingertips are singed with candles – which of course works for "Oldcastle" but not "Falstaff." There is also the "castle" reference in IV,v,6.

18 January 1602 was the date the play was entered into the Register of the Stationers Company. The first quarto was published later that year, in an inferior text, by bookseller Arthur Johnson. It was published in a second quarto in 1619, as part of William Jaggard's False Folio; the superior First Folio text followed in 1623.

The title page of Q1 states that the play was acted by the Lord Chamberlain's Men, "Both before Her Majesty, and elsewhere." The earliest definitely dated performance occurred on 4 November 1604, at Whitehall Palace. The play is also known to have been performed on 15 November 1638, at the Cockpit in Court.

== Analysis and criticism ==
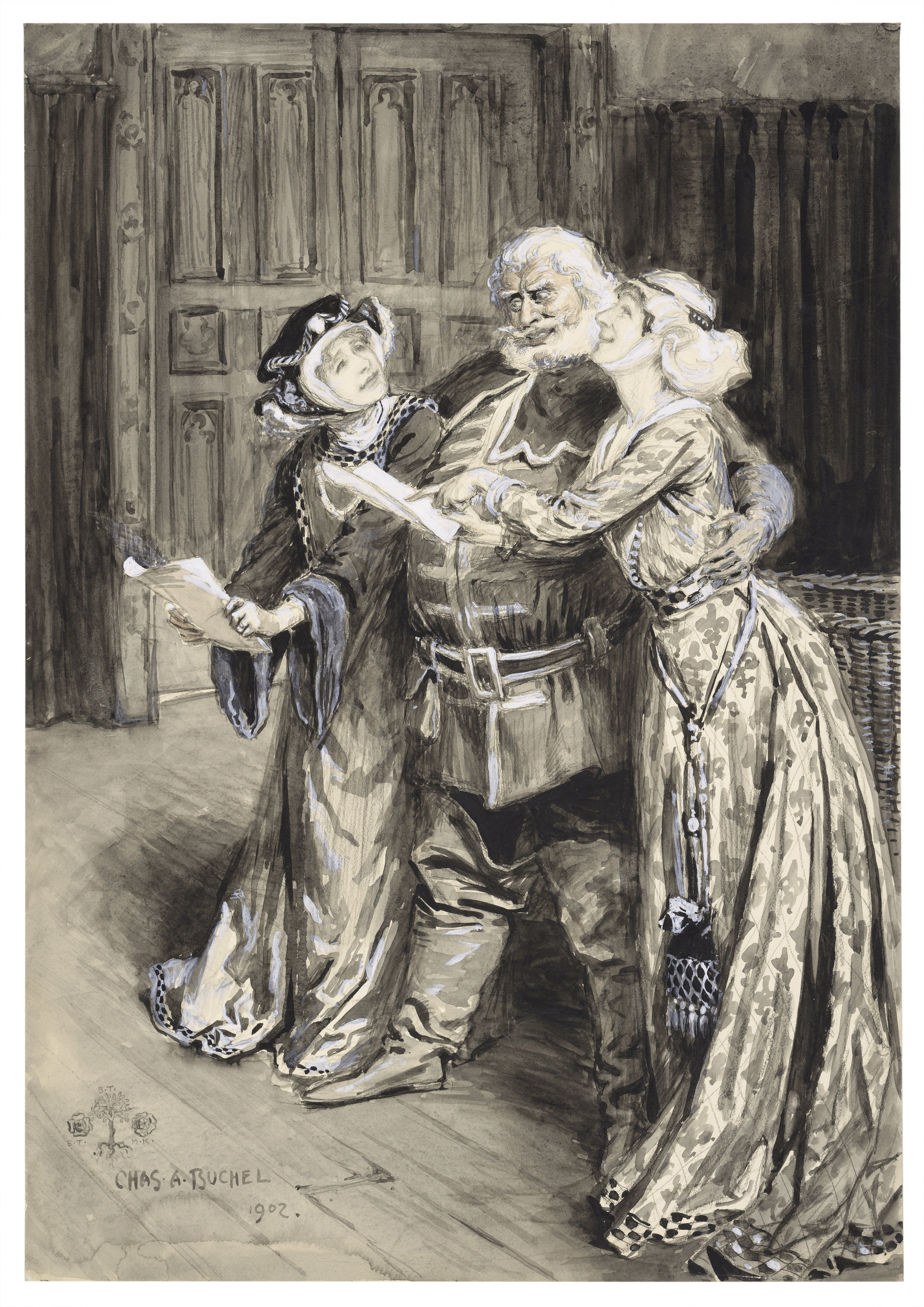
A 1902 illustration done for Herbert Beerbohm Tree's coronation revival, featuring Ellen Terry as Mistress Page, Margaret Kendal as Mistress Ford, and Tree himself as Falstaff.

Considering the Falstaff of The Merry Wives of Windsor in contrast to the Falstaff portrayed in the two Henry IV plays, Mark Van Doren states: "Only the husk of Falstaff's voice is here." Harold Bloom refers to this Falstaff as "a nameless impostor masquerading as the great Sir John Falstaff." He adds:

No longer either witty in himself or the cause of wit in other men, this Falstaff would make me lament a lost glory if I did not know him to be a rank impostor. His fascination, indeed, is that Shakespeare wastes nothing upon him. The Merry Wives of Windsor is Shakespeare's only play that he himself seems to hold in contempt, even as he indites it.

That Shakespeare would so stumble with one of his greatest creations is puzzling and a satisfactory reason for this remains to be found. The most obvious explanation is that it was written very quickly. Leslie Hotson wrote that "it is certain that the play bears the earmarks of hasty writing."

=== Themes ===
Key themes of Merry Wives include love and marriage, jealousy and revenge, social class and wealth. Explored with irony, sexual innuendo, sarcasm, and stereotypical views of classes and nationalities, these themes help to give the play something closer to a modern-day view than is often found in Shakespeare's plays.

The play is centred on the class prejudices of middle-class England. The lower class is represented by characters such as Bardolph, Nym, and Pistol (Falstaff's followers), and the upper class is represented by Sir John Falstaff and Master Fenton. Shakespeare uses both Latin and misused English to represent the attitudes and differences of the people of this era. Much humour is derived from the exaggerated accents of Dr. Caius and Sir Hugh Evans. For example, Caius speaks in an exaggerated French dialect; when he finds out he has married a page instead of Mistress Anne, he exclaims that he has married "oon garcon", and Evans speaks in a thick Welsh accent to the point that Falstaff complains that he "makes fritters of English" (5,5,135). Much of the comedic effect of the play is derived from misunderstandings among characters.

Other scholars say that the treatment of sexual jealousy in the play differs from its treatment in others, like Othello and A Winter's Tale. The jealousy of Leontes and Othello is dangerous and deep-seated, while Ford's jealousy is something to be mocked and laughed at.

== Performance history ==
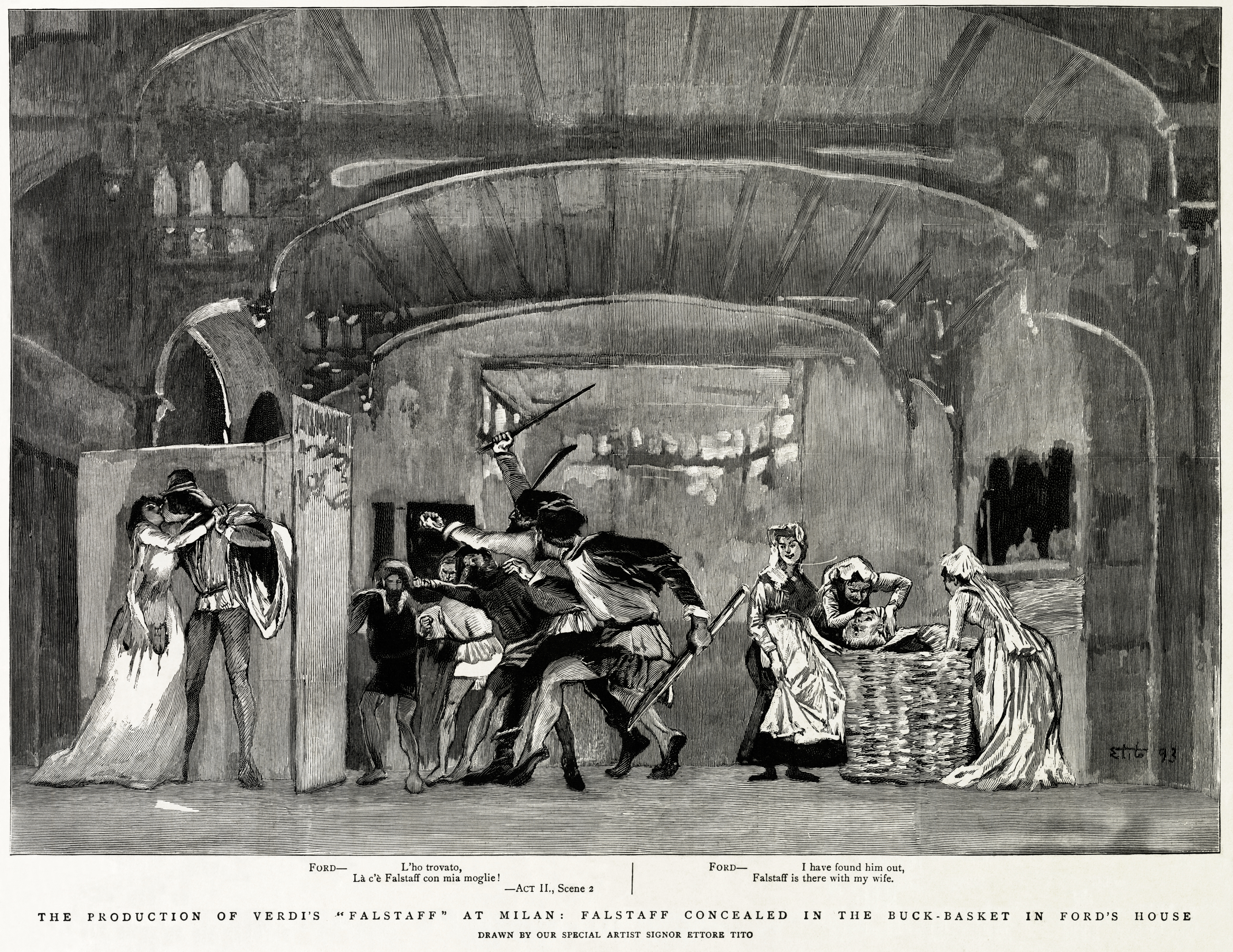
A scene from the original production of Verdi's Falstaff (1893) as depicted by artist Ettore Tito.

Merry Wives was one of the first Shakespearean plays to be performed once the theatres re-opened in 1660 after the Interregnum. Samuel Pepys saw the King's Company act it on 5 Dec. 1660, and again in 1661 and 1667 (though he didn't like it on any occasion). In 1702 John Dennis offered an adaptation (it has been called a "perversion") of the play, titled The Comical Gallant, or the Amours of Sir John Falstaff – which flopped. In 1824 Frederick Reynolds included Merry Wives in his series of operatic adaptations, with music by Henry Bishop. Charles Kean returned to Shakespeare's text in an 1851 production. Arthur Sullivan composed incidental music for use in Act V of an 1874 production at the Gaiety Theatre, London, which was also used in the 1889 Haymarket Theatre production.

During the period of anti-German feelings in England during World War I, many German names and titles were changed and given more English-sounding names, including the royal family's from Saxe-Coburg-Gotha to Windsor. Kaiser Wilhelm II (who as Queen Victoria and Prince Albert's eldest grandson was a member of the House of Saxe-Coburg-Gotha through his mother) countered this by jokingly saying that he wanted to see a command performance of "The Merry Wives of Saxe-Coburg-Gotha."

== Adaptations ==
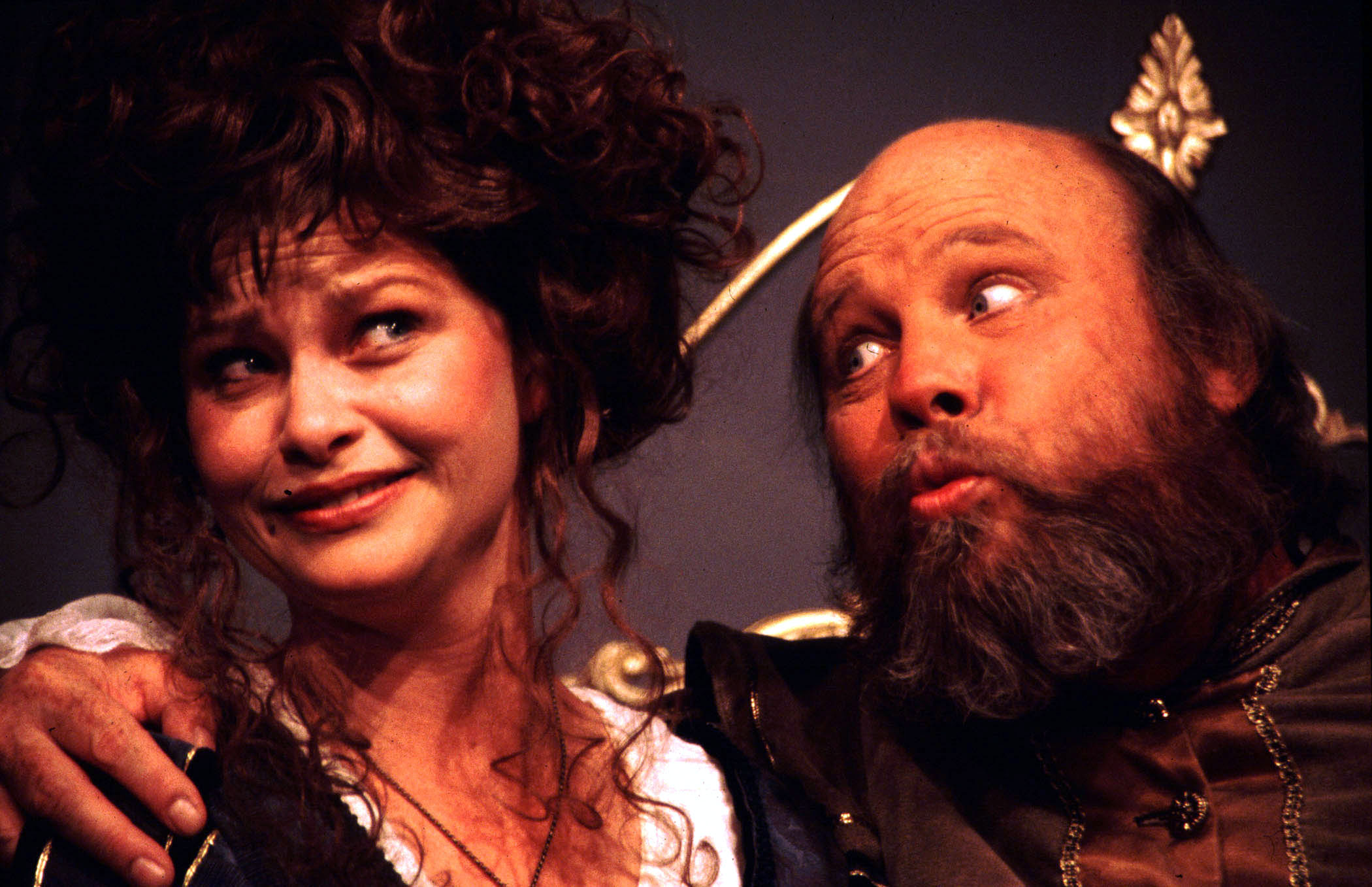
Mistress Page (Julie Hughett) and Falstaff (John Rousseau) in The Merry Wives of Windsor, staged by Pacific Repertory Theatre at the Golden Bough Playhouse in Carmel, California, in 1999.

=== Film ===
- John Tucker Must Die, a loose American modern adaptation of the play that re-imagines it as a teen comedy, directed by Betty Thomas (2006)
- The Other Woman is a 2014 buddy comedy directed by Nick Cassavetes that re-imagines the play in modern day New York City.

=== Plays ===
- The Comical Gallant, a revision and adaptation by John Dennis (1702)
- The Merry Wives of Windsor was adapted and translated into Swahili for the Bitter Pill Company by Joshua Ogutu. It performed at Shakespeare's Globe Theatre in London (2012)
- The Very Merry Wives of Windsor, Iowa by Alison Carey, adapted the play as a modern political satire, blending new dialogue with Shakespeare's text. Premiered at the Oregon Shakespeare Festival (2012)
- The Merry Widows of Windsor by Emily C. A. Snyder is a sequel to Shakespeare's text, written in blank verse. It played as a staged reading at the Sheen Center in New York City (2018).
- Anne Page Hates Fun by Amy E. Whitting is a modern play in conversation with Shakespeare's text. It premiered at the American Shakespeare Center, as one of the winners of Round 1 of Shakespeare's New Contemporaries (2018)
- Merry Wives adapted by Jocelyn Bioh for NYC's Shakespeare in the Park by The Public Theater in 2021. The adaptation is set among West African immigrants in present-day Harlem. The play was also televised for the PBS program Great Performances.

=== Operas ===
- Les deux amies, ou le vieux garçon, music by Louis-August Papavoine (1761)
- Herne le chasseur, music by François-André Danican Philidor, libretto by Douin (1773)
- Die lustigen Weiber von Windsor, libretto by George Christian Romer, music by Peter Ritter (1794)
- Die lustigen Weiber von Windsor, libretto by George Christian Romer, music by Carl Ditters von Dittersdorf (1796)
- Falstaff, an opera buffa by composer Antonio Salieri, with a libretto by Carlo Prospero Defranceschi (1799)
- Falstaff by composer Michael William Balfe, with an Italian libretto by Manfredo Maggioni (1838)
- Die lustigen Weiber von Windsor, a singspiel, by German composer Carl Otto Nicolai (1849). The opera contains much German spoken dialogue, and many of the characters' names have been changed (the names of the Mistresses Ford and Page are now Fluth and Reich) and there is more focus given between the romance of Fenton and Anne. It is the only opera adaptation to include the disguising of Falstaff as a woman.
- Falstaff, one-act, music by Adolphe Adam, libretto by Jules-Henri Vernoy de Saint-Georges and Adolphe de Leuven (1856)
- Falstaff by Giuseppe Verdi, with a libretto by Arrigo Boito, was Verdi's last opera (1893). Some of the changes include Anne (known as Nanetta) now as the daughter of Mistress Ford rather than Mistress Page, and she is betrothed by her father to Dr. Caius alone, with Mistresses Ford and Page conspiring to aid in her elopement with Fenton. The roles of Master Page, Slender, Shallow, Sir Hugh Evans, and many others are eliminated. To flesh out Falstaff's character, librettist Arrigo Boito adds material from Shakespeare's Henry IV, Part I and Part II, including the famous "honour" soliloquy. It is largely considered to be the best operatic adaptation of The Merry Wives of Windsor, as well as one of opera's greatest comic achievements.
- Sir John in Love by English composer Ralph Vaughan Williams (1929). Much of the libretto the composer took directly from Shakespeare's text, making it the most faithful of the operatic adaptations. This is the only opera version to retain all of the characters as well as the subplot of the duel between Dr. Caius and Sir Hugh Evans.
