= The Roland Kirk Quartet Meets the Benny Golson Orchestra =

Studio album by Roland Kirk
- Released: November 1963
- Recorded: June 11–12, 1963
- Genre: Jazz
- Label: Mercury

Roland Kirk chronology
Reeds & Deeds (1963)	The Roland Kirk Quartet Meets the Benny Golson Orchestra (1963)	Kirk in Copenhagen (1964)

Benny Golson chronology
Free (1962)	The Roland Kirk Quartet Meets the Benny Golson Orchestra (1963)	Stockholm Sojourn (1964)

Professional ratings
Review scores
Source	Rating
AllMusic	4/5 stars

The Roland Kirk Quartet Meets the Benny Golson Orchestra is an album by jazz multi-instrumentalist Roland Kirk. It was originally released on the Mercury label in November 1963 and contains performances by Kirk's Quartet and Benny Golson's Orchestra.

== Reception ==
The reviewer for Cash Box noted that their playing together "proves to be worthy and natural as the two come up with some first-rate jazz blendings."

== Track listing ==
All compositions by Roland Kirk except as indicated.

1. "Ecclusiastics" (Charles Mingus) - 4:27
2. "By Myself" (Howard Dietz, Arthur Schwartz) - 4:20
3. "Roland Speaks" (Roland Kirk, Benny Golson) - 3:04
4. "A Nightingale Sang in Berkeley Square" (Manning Sherwin, Eric Maschwitz) - 5:13
5. "Variations on a Theme by Hindemith" - 3:28
6. "I've Got Your Number" (Cy Coleman, Carolyn Leigh) - 5:55
7. "Between the Fourth and the Fifth Step" - 3:41
8. "April Morning" - 3:43
9. "Get in the Basement" - 4:03
10. "Abstract Improvisation" - 1:58

- Recorded in New York on June 11 (tracks 1–5) & June 12 (tracks 6–10), 1963

== Personnel ==
The Roland Kirk Quartet

- Roland Kirk - tenor saxophone, manzello, stritch, flute, siren
- Harold Mabern - piano (tracks 1–9)
- Abdullah Rafik - bass (tracks 6–9)
- Sonny Brown - drums (tracks 6–9)

The Benny Golson Orchestra (tracks 1–5)

- Benny Golson - conductor, arranger
- Richard Williams, Virgil Jones - trumpet
- Charles Greenlee, Tom McIntosh - trombone
- Don Butterfield - tuba
- Richard Davis - bass
- Albert Heath - drums
