= Fever (Roy Ayers album) =

1979 studio album by Roy Ayers

Studio album by Roy Ayers
- Released: 1979
- Studio: Electric Lady, New York City; Sigma Sound, New York City; Record Plant, Los Angeles
- Genre: Soul jazz
- Label: Polydor
- Producer: Roy Ayers; Carla Vaughn

Roy Ayers chronology
Let's Do It (1979)	Fever (1979)	No Stranger to Love (1979)

Singles from Fever
- 1. "Love Will Bring Us Back Together" Released: 1979; 2. "Fever" Released: 1979

Fever is a studio album by American musician Roy Ayers. It was released in 1979 through Polydor Records. The recording sessions for the album took place at Sigma Sound Studios and Electric Lady Studios in New York City, and at Record Plant in Los Angeles. The album was produced by Ayers and Carla Vaughn.

The album peaked at number 67 on the Billboard 200 albums chart and at number 25 on the Top R&B/Hip-Hop Albums chart in the United States. Its lead single, "Love Will Bring Us Back Together", reached peak position No. 41 on the Hot R&B/Hip-Hop Songs chart.

== Critical reception ==
Professional ratings
Review scores
Source	Rating
AllMusic	2/5 stars

The Bay State Banner wrote that Ayers "still cannot sing, but the vibes solos at last have some sting and energy behind them."

== Track listing ==
No.	Title	Writer(s)	Length
1.	"Love Will Bring Us Back Together"	Roy Ayers	6:00
2.	"Simple and Sweet"	Philip Woo	4:45
3.	"Take Me Out to the Ball Game"	Jack Norworth; Albert Von Tilzer	4:12
4.	"I Wanna Feel It (I Wanna Dance)"	Roy Ayers	5:00
5.	"Fever"	Eddie Cooley; John Davenport	5:45
6.	"Is It Too Late to Try?"	Roy Ayers; Carla Vaughn	4:33
7.	"If You Love Me"	Roy Ayers	5:30
8.	"Leo"	Roy Ayers	5:00

== Personnel ==
- Roy Ayers – lead vocals (tracks: 1–7), backing vocals (track 2), electric piano (tracks: 1, 5, 6, 8), clavinet (tracks: 1, 5, 6), handclaps (track 1), cowbell (track 2), ARP String Synthesizer (track 4), vibraphone (tracks: 6–8), ARP Omni (track 8), producer
- Carla Vaughn – lead vocals (tracks: 2, 3, 6), backing vocals (tracks: 1, 5), co-producer
- Wayne Garfield – lead vocals (track 4)
- Kathleen Jackson – lead vocals (track 4)
- Ethel Beatty – backing vocals (track 2)
- Jim Gilstrap – backing vocals (track 5)
- Philip Woo – ARP String Synthesizer & Oberheim piano (track 2)
- Harold Land Jr. – electric piano (tracks: 4, 7), piano (track 7)
- Chuck Anthony – guitar (tracks: 1, 4, 5, 8)
- George Baker – guitar (tracks: 2, 3)
- Gregory David Moore – guitar (track 7)
- William Henry Allen – bass (tracks: 1, 3, 6), handclaps (track 1)
- Kerry Turman – bass (tracks: 2, 4, 5, 7)
- Neil Jason – bass (track 8)
- Bernard Lee "Pretty" Purdie – drums (tracks: 1–4, 8)
- Gene Dunlap – drums (tracks: 5, 7)
- Howard Terrance King – drums (track 6)
- Chano O'Ferral – percussion (track 2), congas (tracks: 5, 7)
- James Richard "Dick" Griffin – trombone (track 2)
- Justo Almario – tenor saxophone (tracks: 3, 4, 7, 8)
- John Clifford Mosley Jr. – trumpet (track 4)
- Sinclair Acey – trumpet (track 7)

Technical

- Jerry Solomon – engineering
- Ron Johnsen – engineering
- Andy Abrams – engineering
- Deni King – engineering
- Carla Bandini – assistant engineering
- Greg Calbi – mastering

== Chart history ==
Chart (1979)	Peak position
US Billboard 200	67
US Top R&B/Hip-Hop Albums (Billboard)	25
