= Volunteered Slavery =

Studio album by Roland Kirk
- Released: 1969
- Recorded: July 7, 1968; July 22–23, 1969
- Genre: Jazz
- Label: Atlantic
- Producer: Joel Dorn

Roland Kirk chronology
Left & Right (1968)	Volunteered Slavery (1969)	Rahsaan Rahsaan (1970)

Professional ratings
Review scores
Source	Rating
AllMusic	4.5/5 stars
The Encyclopedia of Popular Music	4/5 stars
The Penguin Guide to Jazz Recordings	3.5/4 stars
Rolling Stone	(favorable)

Volunteered Slavery is an album by jazz multi-instrumentalist Roland Kirk containing portions of his 1968 Newport Jazz Festival performance along with studio recordings from July 1969. It was released on the Atlantic label and features performances by Kirk with Rahn Burton, Vernon Martin, Jimmy Hopps and Joseph "Habao" Texidor, Dick Griffin, Charles McGhee, Sonny Brown, Charles Crosby and the "Roland Kirk Spirit Choir".

== Critical reception ==
The AllMusic review by Thom Jurek states: "Volunteered Slavery, with its beat/African chanted poetry and post-bop blues ethos was certainly the first strike in the right direction... Kirk proves that he is indeed the master of any music he plays because his sense of harmony, rhythm, and melody comes not only from the masters acknowledged, but also from the collective heart of the people the masters touched. It's just awesome".

== Track listing ==
All compositions by Roland Kirk except as indicated.

1. "Volunteered Slavery" - 5:43
2. "Spirits Up Above" - 3:37
3. "My Cherie Amour" (Henry Cosby, Sylvia Moy, Stevie Wonder) - 3:20
4. "Search for the Reason Why" - 2:07
5. "I Say a Little Prayer" (Burt Bacharach, Hal David) - 7:59
6. "Roland's Opening Remarks" - 0:41
7. "One Ton" - 5:02
8. "Ovation and Roland's Remarks" - 1:42
9. "A Tribute to John Coltrane: Lush Life/Afro-Blue/Bessie's Blues" (Billy Strayhorn/Mongo Santamaría/John Coltrane) - 8:14
10. "Three for the Festival" - 4:23

- Recorded at the Newport Jazz Festival, Newport, Rhode Island, July 7, 1968 (tracks 6–10) and Regent Sound Studios, NYC, July 22 (tracks 2 & 4) and 23 (tracks 1, 3, & 5), 1969

== Personnel ==
- Roland Kirk: tenor saxophone, manzello, stritch, clarinet, flute, nose flute, whistle, voice, Stylophone
- Charles McGhee: trumpet (tracks 1 & 5)
- Dick Griffin: trombone (tracks 1 & 5)
- Ron Burton: piano
- Vernon Martin: bass
- Charles Crosby: drums (track 1)
- Sonny Brown: drums (tracks 2–5)
- Jimmy Hopps: drums (tracks 6–10)
- Joseph "Habao" Texidor: tambourine
- The Roland Kirk Spirit Choir (tracks 1–5)
