= Rahsaan Rahsaan =

Live album by Rahsaan Roland Kirk
- Released: 1970
- Recorded: May 11, 12 & 15 1970
- Genre: Jazz
- Label: Atlantic

Rahsaan Roland Kirk chronology
Volunteered Slavery (1968)	Rahsaan Rahsaan (1970)	Natural Black Inventions: Root Strata (1971)

Professional ratings
Review scores
Source	Rating
Allmusic	4/5 stars
The Penguin Guide to Jazz Recordings	2.5/4 stars

Rahsaan Rahsaan is a live album by jazz multi-instrumentalist Rahsaan Roland Kirk featuring performances recorded at the Village Vanguard in May 1970. It was originally released on the Atlantic label in 1970 and features performances by Kirk with Rahn Burton, Vernon Martin, James Madison and Joe Habad Texidor with Dick Griffin, Howard Johnson, Leroy Jenkins, Sonelius Smith and Alvern Bunn added on an extended track. The Allmusic review by Thom Jurek states "Rahsaan was the king of the riff—he could use it until it bit you—and once it did he was off and running someplace else, down on the hard-swinging outer spaceways of his mind and heart".

== Track listing ==
All compositions by Roland Kirk except as indicated.

1. "The Seeker: Black Classical Rap / The Seeker / Thank You, Bird / New Orleans" – 17:18
2. "Satin Doll" (Duke Ellington, Johnny Mercer, Billy Strayhorn) – 2:17
3. "Introduction" – 1:38
4. Medley: "Going Home" (Antonín Dvořák) / "Sentimental Journey" (Les Brown, Bud Green, Ben Homer) / "In Monument" / "Lover" (Richard Rodgers, Lorenz Hart) – 4:46
5. "Sweet Fire" – 6:10
6. "Introduction" – 3:19
7. "Baby Let Me Shake Your Tree" – 4:54

- Recorded in NYC on May 11 (track 1) and at the Village Vanguard, NYC on May 12 (tracks 3–7) & 15 (track 2), 1970

== Personnel ==
- Roland Kirk: tenor saxophone, manzello, stritch, clarinet, flute, miscellaneous instruments
- Dick Griffin: trombone (track 1)
- Howard Johnson: tuba (track 1)
- Leroy Jenkins: violin (track 1)
- Rahn Burton: piano
- Sonelius Smith: celesta, piano (track 1)
- Vernon Martin: bass
- James Madison: drums
- Alvern Bunn: congas (track 1)
- Joe Habao Texidor: tambourine, chime tree
