= Vernon Martin (jazz bassist) =

American jazz double bassist (1932–2000)

- Born: Vernon Shelby Martin; January 5, 1932; Toledo, Ohio, U.S.
- Died: November 10, 2000 (aged 68) Los Angeles, California, U.S.
- Genres: Jazz
- Occupation: Musician
- Instrument: Double bass
- Years active: 1962-2000
- Labels: Mercury; Verve; Atlantic
- Formerly of: Rahsaan Roland Kirk

Vernon Shelby Martin (January 5, 1932 – November 10, 2000) was an American jazz double bassist known for his work with Rahsaan Roland Kirk.

== Discography ==
As sideman

- 1962: Domino - Rahsaan Roland Kirk
- 1968: Left & Right - Rahsaan Roland Kirk
- 1969: Volunteered Slavery - Rahsaan Roland Kirk
- 1970: Rahsaan Rahsaan - Rahsaan Roland Kirk
