= Left & Right (album) =

Studio album by Roland Kirk
- Released: 1969
- Recorded: June 17–18, 1968
- Genre: Jazz
- Label: Atlantic
- Producer: Joel Dorn

Roland Kirk chronology
The Inflated Tear (1967)	Left & Right (1969)	Volunteered Slavery (1968)

Professional ratings
Review scores
Source	Rating
AllMusic	4.5/5 stars
The Penguin Guide to Jazz Recordings	3/4 stars

Left & Right is an album by the jazz multi-instrumentalist Roland Kirk, released on the Atlantic label in 1969. It contains performances by Kirk with Jim Buffington, Julius Watkins, Frank Wess, Rahn Burton, Vernon Martin and Roy Haynes, with Warren Smith, Richard Williams, Dick Griffin, Benny Powell, Pepper Adams, Alice Coltrane, Jimmy Hopps, Daniel Jones and Gerald "Sonny" Brown featuring on an extended track with orchestration by Gil Fuller.

== Critical reception ==
The AllMusic review by Thom Jurek states: "The title of this album, Left and Right, no doubt refers to the sides of Rahsaan Roland Kirk's brain, which were both heavily taxed in the composing, arranging, conducting, and playing of this recording... This is an extreme for Rahsaan — extremely brilliant and thoroughly accessible".

== Track listing ==
All compositions by Roland Kirk except as indicated.

1. "Black Mystery Has Been Revealed" – 1:17
2. "Expansions: Kirkquest/Kingus Mingus/Celestialness/A Dream of Beauty Reincarnated/Frisco Vibrations/Classical Jazzical/El Kirk" – 19:37
3. "Lady's Blues" – 3:46
4. "IX Love" (Charles Mingus) – 3:40
5. "Hot Cha" (Willie Woods) – 3:23
6. "Quintessence" (Quincy Jones) – 4:11
7. "I Waited for You" (Gil Fuller, Dizzy Gillespie) – 2:54
8. "A Flower is a Lovesome Thing" (Billy Strayhorn) – 3:55

- Recorded in NYC on June 17 & 18, 1968

== Personnel ==
- Roland Kirk: tenor saxophone, manzello, stritch, clarinet, flute, organ, narration, thumb piano, celesta
- Jim Buffington, Julius Watkins: French horn
- Frank Wess: woodwinds
- Richard Williams: trumpet (track 2)
- Dick Griffith, Benny Powell: trombone (track 2)
- Daniel Jones: bassoon (track 2)
- Pepper Adams: baritone saxophone (track 2)
- Alice Coltrane: harp (track 2)
- Ron Burton: piano
- Vernon Martin: bass
- Roy Haynes: drums
- Jimmy Hopps: drums (track 2)
- Warren Smith: percussion, vocals
- Gerald "Sonny" Brown: percussion (track 2)
- Gil Fuller: arranger
- Unidentified strings
