= Natural Black Inventions: Root Strata =

Studio album by Rahsaan Roland Kirk
- Released: 1971
- Recorded: January 26 & February 4, 1971
- Genre: Jazz
- Label: Atlantic

Rahsaan Roland Kirk chronology
Rahsaan Rahsaan (1970)	Natural Black Inventions: Root Strata (1971)	Blacknuss (1972)

Professional ratings
Review scores
Source	Rating
AllMusic	4/5 stars

Natural Black Inventions: Root Strata is an album by jazz multi-instrumentalist Rahsaan Roland Kirk featuring performances by Kirk with accompaniment by drummer Maurice McKinley and percussionist Joseph "Habao" Texidor, and with Sonelius Smith on piano on three tracks.

== Releases and reception ==
The album was originally released by Atlantic Records. It was first released on CD in 1998, by 32 Records. The AllMusic review by Scott Yanow states: "The performances are episodic and colorful with plenty of humor and adventurous moments, worthy of repeated listenings and amazement". The JazzTimes wrote that Kirk "forces the listener to hear his multi-horn free associations and his serpentine asides not as charming, off-center diversions, but as pointedly structuralist works".

== Track listing ==
All compositions by Rahsaan Roland Kirk except as indicated.

1. "Something for Trane That Trane Could Have Said" - 3:08
2. "Island Cry" - 3:54
3. "Runnin' from the Trash" - 2:16
4. "Day Dream" (Duke Ellington, John Latouche, Billy Strayhorn) - 3:42
5. "The Ragman and the Junkman Ran from the Businessman They Laughed and He Cried" - 3:04
6. "Breath-A-Thon" - 1:55
7. "Rahsaanica" - 3:43
8. "Raped Voices" - 1:47
9. "Haunted Feelings" - 2:27
10. "Prelude Back Home" - 3:45
11. "Dance of the Lobes" - 2:06
12. "Harder and Harder Spiritual" - 2:35
13. "Black Root (Back to the Root)" - 3:17

- Recorded at Regent Sound Studios, NYC, January 26 (tracks 1–3, 5, & 7–12) and February 4 (tracks 4, 6 & 13), 1971

== Personnel ==
- Roland Kirk: tenor saxophone, manzello, stritch, clarinet, flute, black mystery pipes, harmonium, piccolo, bass drum, thundersheet, cymbals, bells, music box, palms, timpani, gong, bird sounds
- Maurice McKinley; drums
- Joe Habad Texidor: tambourine, triangle, washboard, thundersheet
- Sonelius Smith: piano (tracks 4, 6, 13)
