= Jazz for a Rainy Afternoon =

Compilation album by Various Artists
- Released: March 17, 1998
- Genre: Jazz
- Length: 56:43
- Label: 32 Jazz Records
- Producer: Joel Dorn (compilation)

Jazz for a Rainy Afternoon is a compilation album by various jazz artists. It is meant to be a background record and played at a low volume, as written in the liner notes by Joel Dorn, the compilation producer.

== Critical reception ==
Professional ratings
Review scores
Source	Rating
AllMusic	3/5 stars

Scott Yanow of AllMusic says that while all of the performances are available elsewhere, the overall atmosphere is pleasing.

== Track listing ==
No.	Title	Writer(s)	Artist	Length
1.	"'Round Midnight"	Cootie Williams; Thelonious Monk; Bernie Hanighen	Charles Brown	3:37
2.	"Spring Can Really Hang You Up the Most"	Tommy Wolf; Fran Landesman	Houston Person & Ron Carter	5:11
3.	"Everything Must Change"	Benard Ighner	David "Fathead" Newman	4:22
4.	"A Tribute to a Rose"	Jimmy Ponder	Jimmy Ponder	2:16
5.	"Blue in Green"	Bill Evans	Wallace Roney	5:46
6.	"Talk of the Town"	Jerry Livingston; Allen J. Neiburg; Marty Symes	Houston Person	6:59
7.	"Ruby, My Dear"	Thelonious Monk	Hank Jones	3:55
8.	"I Can't Get Started"	Vernon Duke; Ira Gershwin	Warren Vaché	6:25
9.	"My Ideal"	Leo Robin; Richard A. Whiting; Newell Chase	Sonny Criss	3:45
10.	"St. Louis Blues"	W. C. Handy	Johnny Lytle	7:02
11.	"Imagination"	Johnny Burke; James Van Heusen	Woody Shaw	7:25
Total length:				56:43

== Musicians ==
1. "'Round Midnight"

- Charles Brown – Piano

2. "Spring Can Really Hang You Up the Most"

- Houston Person – Tenor Saxophone
- Ron Carter – Bass

3. "Everything Must Change"

- David "Fathead" Newman – Soprano Saxophone
- Marcus Belgrave – Flugelhorn
- Cedar Walton – Electric Piano
- Buster Williams – Bass
- Louis Hayes – Drums

4. "A Tribute to a Rose"

- Jimmy Ponder – Guitar

5. "Blue in Green"

- Wallace Roney – Trumpet
- Gary Thomas – Tenor Saxophone
- Mulgrew Miller – Piano
- Charnett Moffett – Bass
- Tony Williams – Drums

6. "Talk of the Town"

- Houston Person – Tenor Saxophone
- Stan Hope – Piano
- Buster Williams – Bass
- Grady Tate – Drums

7. "Ruby, My Dear"

- Hank Jones – Piano
- George Duvivier – Bass
- Ben Riley – Drums

8. "I Can't Get Started"

- Warren Vaché – Cornet
- Richard Wyands – Piano
- Michael Moore – Bass
- Billy Hart – Drums

9. "My Ideal"

- Sonny Criss – Alto Saxophone
- Dolo Coker – Piano
- Larry Gales – Bass
- Jimmie Smith – Drums

10. "St. Louis Blues"

- Johnny Lytle – Vibraphone
- Melvin Sparks – Guitar
- David Braham – Organ
- Peter Martin Weiss – Bass
- Greg Bandy – Drums

11. "Imagination"

- Woody Shaw – Trumpet
- Kirk Lightsey – Piano
- Steve Turre – Trombone
- Ray Drummond – Bass
- Carl Allen – Drums

== Production ==
- Joel Dorn – Compilation Producer, Liner Notes
- Richard Ables – Producer (Track 7)
- Bob Porter – Producer (Track 9)
- Tony Williams – Producer (Track 5)
- Don Sickler – Producer (Track 8, 11)
- Fred Seibert – Producer (Track 7)
- Houston Person – Producer (Track 1, 2, 4, 6, 10)
- Michael Cuscuna – Producer (Track 3, 5)

Track information and credits adapted from the album's liner notes.

== Charts ==
Chart (1999)	Peak position
US Jazz Albums (Billboard)	2
US Traditional Jazz (Billboard)	1
