= Thunder sheet =

Percussion instrument

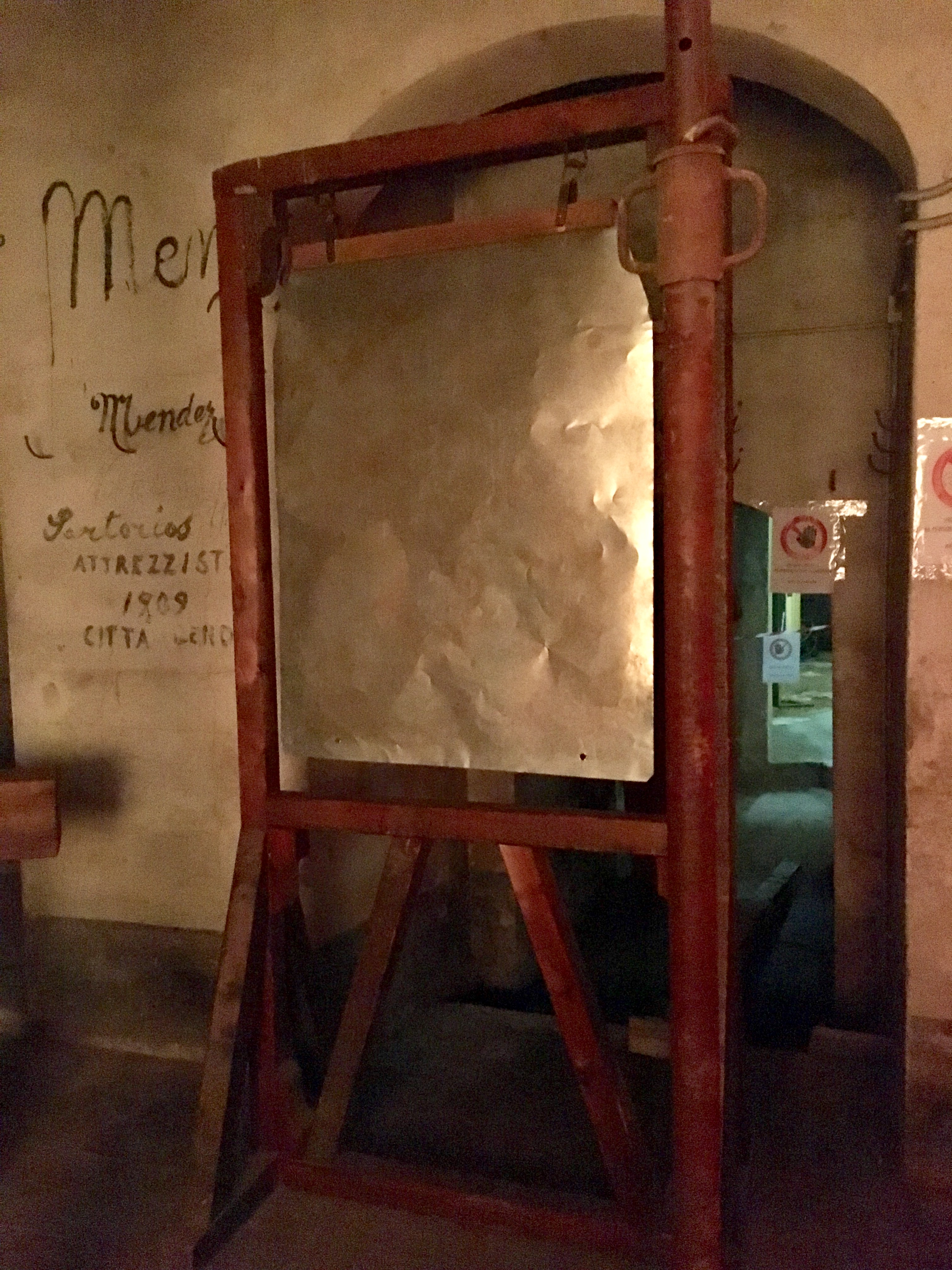
- A thunder sheet at the Teatro della Pergola

Percussion instrument
- Other names: Thunder machine; machine à tonnerre (fr); Donnerblech, Donnermaschine (de)
- Classification: Percussion
- Hornbostel–Sachs classification: 111.221+112.1 (Individual percussion plaques, or the player makes a shaking motion)

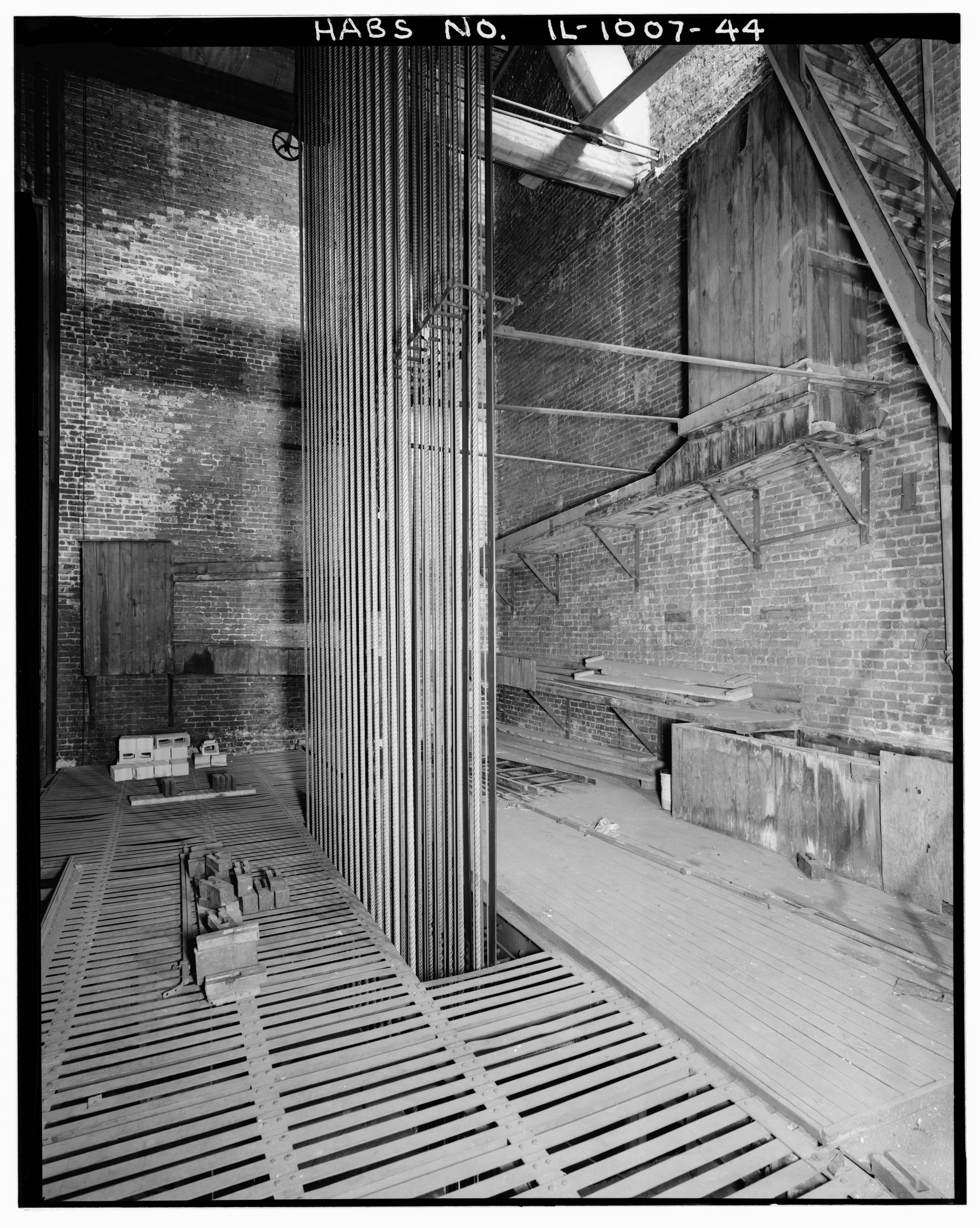
The thunder machine in the Auditorium Theatre.

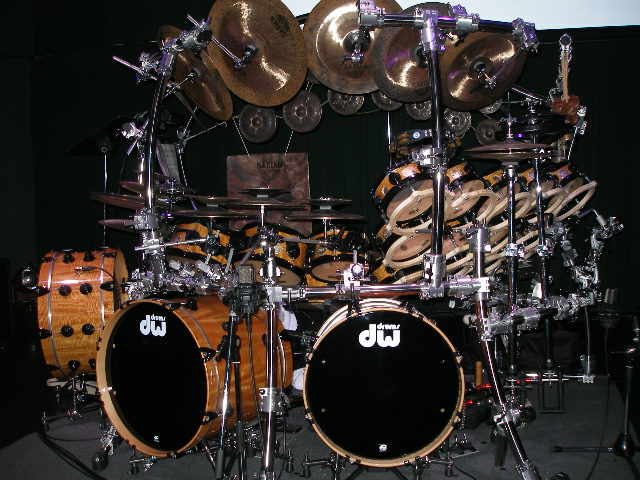
Sabian thunder sheet at the rear of Terry Bozzio's very large drum kit.

A thunder sheet is a thin sheet of metal used to produce sound effects for musical or dramatic events. The device may be shaken, causing it to vibrate, or struck with a mallet. It is also known as a thunder machine, though this can also refer to a large drum used for a similar sound effect.

Thunder sheets are available from some cymbal makers including Paiste and Sabian, or can easily be made out of any scrap metal sheet. The thinner and larger the sheet, the louder the sound. The thunder sheet needs to be "warmed up" before sounding. The player(s) will need to start slowly shaking the sheet a few seconds before quickly shaking the sheet.

== Usage ==
Dramatist John Dennis devised the thunder sheet as a new method of producing theatrical thunder for his tragedy Appius and Virginia (1709) at the Theatre Royal, Drury Lane, London. His invention was co-opted by another play at the same theater, and he complained how they dared to "steal my thunder", notwithstanding that the theater still had possession and legal ownership of the equipment that Dennis had constructed.

Notable orchestral works in which the instrument has been used include the following:

- Richard Strauss: Eine Alpensinfonie and the opera Die Frau ohne Schatten
- Giuseppe Verdi: Otello
- Richard Wagner: Der Ring des Nibelungen and Parsifal.
- Mozart: The Magic Flute
- Ignacy Jan Paderewski: Symphony in B minor "Polonia" (1903–08)
- Alan Hovhaness: "Invocation to Vahakn No. 3"
- Engelbert Humperdinck: Hänsel und Gretel

The American rock band The Grateful Dead, for example, were also notable for using thunder machines.

== Theatre ==
Prior to the invention of the thunder sheet, alternative machines had been employed in the theatre, such as rolling a ball down a trough striking wooden cleats. Such a machine was called a "thunder run", and variations are often still used today, as well as the thunder sheet.

== See also ==
- Bell plate
- Gong – Percussion instrument
- Wobble board – Musical instrument invented by Rolf Harris
- Castle thunder – Recording of thunder used as a sound effect
