= Bibliography of jazz =

== General and history ==
- Ake, David Andrew (2002). Jazz Cultures. University of California Press. ISBN 978-0-520-92696-7.
- Ake, David; Garrett, Charles Hiroshi; Goldmark, Daniel (13 May 2012). Jazz/Not Jazz: The Music and Its Boundaries. University of California Press. ISBN 978-0-520-95135-8.
- Atkins, E. Taylor (1 November 2003). Jazz Planet. Univ. Press of Mississippi. p. 151. ISBN 978-1-57806-609-4.
- Berendt, Joachim-Ernst (2009). The Jazz Book: From Ragtime to the 21st Century (7 ed.). Chicago, Ill.: Lawrence Hill Books. ISBN 978-1-55652820-0.
- Bjorn, Lars (2001). Before Motown: A History of Jazz in Detroit, 1920-60. University of Michigan Press. ISBN 0-472-06765-6.
- Bogdanov, Vladimir, ed. (2002). All Music Guide to Jazz: The Definitive Guide to Jazz Music (4 ed.). San Francisco, CA: Backbeat Books [u.a.] ISBN 978-0-87930-717-2.
- Boyd, Jean A. (1998). The Jazz of the Southwest: An Oral History of Western Swing. University of Texas Press. ISBN 978-0-292-70860-0.
- Carr, Ian; Fairweather, Digby; Priestley, Brian; Chris Parker (1995). Jazz: The Rough Guide. Rough Guides. ISBN 978-1-85828-137-7.
- Charters, Samuel Barclay (1962). Jazz: A History of the New York Scene. Da Capo Press. ISBN 978-0-306-80225-6.
- Chiswick, Linton (1997). Milestones of Jazz: A Chronological History of Jazz Music in Photographs. CLB. ISBN 978-1-85833-764-7.
- Collier, James Lincoln (1995). Jazz. Oxford University Press. ISBN 978-0-19-535722-6.
- Conyers, James L. Jr. (26 December 2000). African American Jazz and Rap: Social and Philosophical Examinations of Black Expressive Behavior. McFarland. ISBN 978-0-7864-6238-4.
- Cooke, Mervyn; Horn, David (2002). The Cambridge Companion to Jazz. Cambridge Companions to Music. Cambridge University Press. ISBN 978-0-521-66388-5.
- Cook, Richard; Morton, Brian (2008). The Penguin Guide to Jazz. Penguin. ISBN 978-0-14-103401-0.
- Crow, Bill (12 August 2005). Jazz Anecdotes : Second Time Around. Oxford University Press. ISBN 978-0-19-972648-6.
- DeVeaux, Scott Knowles (1999). The Birth of Bebop: A Social and Musical History. University of California Press. ISBN 978-0-520-21665-5.
- Dregni, Michael (2006). Django Reinhardt and the Illustrated History of Gypsy Jazz. Fulcrum Publishing. ISBN 978-1-933108-10-0.
- Driggs, Frank; Haddix, Chuck (2006). Kansas City Jazz: From Ragtime to Bebop – A History. Oxford University Press. ISBN 978-0-19-530712-2.
- Dyer, Geoff (10 May 2012). But Beautiful: A Book About Jazz. Canongate Books. ISBN 978-0-85786-335-5.
- Feather, Leonard; Gitler, Ira (18 November 1999). The Biographical Encyclopedia of Jazz. Oxford University Press. ISBN 978-0-19-972907-4.
- Fernandez, Raul A. (2006). From Afro-Cuban Rhythms to Latin Jazz. University of California Press. ISBN 978-0-520-93944-8.
- Gabbard, Krin (1 January 1995). Jazz Among the Discourses. Duke University Press. ISBN 0-8223-1596-3.
- Gabbard, Krin (1 January 1995). Representing Jazz. Duke University Press. ISBN 0-8223-1594-7.
- Gerard, Charley (1 January 1998). Jazz in Black and White: Race, Culture, and Identity in the Jazz Community. Praeger. ISBN 978-0-275-96198-5.
- Giddins, Gary (22 October 1998). Visions of Jazz: The First Century. Oxford University Press. ISBN 978-0-19-987953-3.
- Gioia, Ted (8 April 2011). The History of Jazz. Oxford University Press. ISBN 978-0-19-983187-6.
- Gioia, Ted (2012). The Jazz Standards: A Guide to the Repertoire. Oxford: Oxford University Press. ISBN 978-0199937394.
- Gioia, Ted (1998). West Coast Jazz: Modern Jazz in California, 1945-1960. University of California Press. ISBN 978-0-520-21729-4.
- Gitler, Ira (7 November 1985). Swing to Bop : An Oral History of the Transition in Jazz in the 1940s. Oxford University Press. ISBN 978-0-19-536411-8.
- Godbolt, Jim (January 2010). A History of Jazz in Britain: 1919 – 1950. Northway Publications. ISBN 978-0-9557888-1-9.
- Gourse, Leslie (1996). Madame Jazz: Contemporary Women Instrumentalists. Oxford University Press. ISBN 978-0-19-510647-3.
- Hardie, Daniel (11 December 2013). Jazz Historiography: The Story of Jazz History Writing. iUniverse. ISBN 978-1-4917-1444-7.
- Hennessey, Thomas J. (1994). From Jazz to Swing: African-American Jazz Musicians and Their Music, 1890–1935. Wayne State University Press. ISBN 0-8143-2179-8.
- Jenkins, Todd S. (2004). Free Jazz and Free Improvisation: An Encyclopedia. Greenwood Publishing Group. ISBN 978-0-313-33313-2.
- Kernfeld, Barry, ed. (2002). The New Grove dictionary of Jazz (2 ed.). New York: Grove's Dictionaries. ISBN 1-56159-284-6.
- Kernfeld, Barry (1995). What to Listen for in Jazz. New Haven: Yale University Press. ISBN 978-0300072594.
- Kirchner, Bill (14 July 2005). The Oxford Companion to Jazz. Oxford University Press. ISBN 978-0-19-518359-7.
- Koenig, Karl (2002). Jazz in Print (1859–1929). Pendragon Press. ISBN 978-1-57647-024-4.
- Larson, Tom (2011). History and Tradition of Jazz. Kendall/Hunt Publishing Company. ISBN 978-0-7575-8727-6.
- Meeder, Christopher (6 August 2012). Jazz: The Basics. Routledge. ISBN 978-1-135-88712-4.
- Miller, Mark (2005). Some Hustling This! – Taking Jazz to the World, 1914–1929. The Mercury Press. ISBN 1-55128-119-8.
- Miller, Robin J. (2005). The Jazz History Quilt. AuthorHouse. ISBN 978-1-4208-3566-3.
- Neely, Tim (28 February 2011). Goldmine Jazz Album Price Guide: 50 Years of Jazz on Vinyl. Krause Publications. ISBN 978-1-4402-2772-1.
- Newton-Matza, Mitchell (2009). Jazz Age: People and Perspectives. ABC-CLIO. ISBN 978-1-59884-033-9.
- Ogren, Kathy J. (1992). The Jazz Revolution. Oxford University Press. ISBN 978-0-19-536062-2.
- Owens, Thomas. Bebop. Oxford University Press. ISBN 978-0-19-535553-6.
- Owsley, Dennis (2006). City of Gabriels: The History of Jazz in St. Louis, 1895–1973. Reedy Press. ISBN 978-1-933370-04-0.
- Porter, Eric (2002). What Is This Thing Called Jazz?: African American Musicians as Artists, Critics, and Activists. University of California Press. ISBN 978-0-520-92840-4.
- Ratliff, Ben (2009). The Jazz Ear: Conversations over Music (1st pbk. ed.). New York: Times Books. ISBN 978-0805090864.
- Schuller, Gunther (1968). Early Jazz: Its Roots and Musical Development. Oxford University Press. ISBN 978-0-19-504043-2.
- Shaw, Arnold (1989). The Jazz Age: Popular Music in the 1920s. Oxford University Press. ISBN 978-0-19-506082-9.
- Stearns, Marshall Winslow (1956). The Story of Jazz. Oxford University Press. ISBN 978-0-19-501269-9.
- Tirro, Frank (1993). Jazz: A History. Norton. ISBN 978-0-393-96368-7.
- Townsend, Peter (2000). Jazz in American Culture. Univ. Press of Mississippi. ISBN 978-1-57806-324-6.
- Walser, Robert (2014). Keeping Time: Readings in Jazz History. Oxford University Press. ISBN 978-0-19-976577-5.
- Ward, Geoffrey C. (2001). Jazz: A History of America's Music. Pimlico. ISBN 978-0-7126-6769-2.
- Watkins, Candice; Howard, Arnett (2012). Ohio Jazz: A History of Jazz in the Buckeye State. The History Press. ISBN 978-1-60949-575-6.
- Yanow, Scott (2000). Bebop. Miller Freeman Books. ISBN 978-0-87930-608-3.
- Yanow, Scott (2000). Swing. San Francisco: Miller Freeman. ISBN 978-0879306007.
- Yurochko, Bob (1993). A Short History of Jazz. Rowman & Littlefield. ISBN 978-0-8304-1595-3.

== Autobiography and biography ==
Louis Armstrong

- Armstrong, Louis (2001). Louis Armstrong, in His Own Words: Selected Writings. Oxford University Press. ISBN 978-0-19-514046-0.
- Boujut, Michel (1998). Louis Armstrong. Rizzoli. ISBN 9780847821310.
- Brothers, Thomas (17 April 2007). Louis Armstrong's New Orleans. W. W. Norton & Company. ISBN 978-0-393-33001-4.
- Collier, James Lincoln (1983). Louis Armstrong: An American Genius. Oxford University Press. ISBN 978-0-19-536507-8.
- Giddins, Gary; Armstrong, Louis (1 March 2009). Satchmo: The Genius of Louis Armstrong. Da Capo Press. ISBN 978-0-7867-3145-9.
- Nollen, Scott Allen (1 January 2004). Louis Armstrong: The Life, Music, and Screen Career. McFarland. ISBN 978-0-7864-1857-2.
- Storb, Ilse (1999). Louis Armstrong: the definitive biography. Peter Lang. ISBN 9780820431031.
- Teachout, Terry. Pops: A Life of Louis Armstrong. (2009)
- Yomtov, Nel (1 July 2012). Louis Armstrong: Jazz Legend. Capstone Press, Incorporated. ISBN 978-1-62065-267-1.

Count Basie

- Basie, Count (2002). Good Morning Blues: The Autobiography of Count Basie. Da Capo Press. ISBN 0-306-81107-3.
- Cole, Bill (1974). Miles Davis: the early years. Da Capo Press. ISBN 978-0-306-80554-7.
- Dance, Stanley (1985). The World of Count Basie. Da Capo Press. ISBN 978-0-306-80245-4.
- Kliment, Bud (1 January 1994). Count Basie. Holloway House Publishing. ISBN 978-0-87067-776-2.
- Vail, Ken (1 January 2003). Count Basie: Swingin' the Blues, 1936-1950. Scarecrow Press. ISBN 978-0-8108-4882-5.

Art Blakey

- Goldsher, Alan (2002). Hard Bop Academy: The Sidemen of Art Blakey and the Jazz Messengers. Hal Leonard Corporation. ISBN 978-0-634-03793-1.
- Gourse, Leslie. Art Blakey. Schirmer Trade Books. ISBN 978-0-85712-837-9.
- Ramsay, John (1994). Art Blakey's Jazz Messages. Alfred Music Publishing. ISBN 978-0-7604-0009-8.

John Coltrane

- Baker, David (1980). The Jazz Style of John Coltrane: A Musical and Historical Perspective. Alfred Music Publishing. ISBN 978-1-4574-9414-7.
- Barron, Rachel (2002). John Coltrane: Jazz Revolutionary. Morgan Reynolds. ISBN 978-1-883846-57-2.
- Brown, Leonard (11 August 2010). John Coltrane and Black America's Quest for Freedom: Spirituality and the Music. Oxford University Press. ISBN 978-0-19-977974-1.
- Cole, Bill (2001). John Coltrane. Da Capo Press. ISBN 0-306-81062-X.
- Golio, Gary (2012). Spirit Seeker: John Coltrane's Musical Journey. Houghton Mifflin Harcourt. ISBN 978-0-547-23994-1.
- Nisenson, Eric (5 August 2009). Ascension: John Coltrane and His Quest. Da Capo Press, Incorporated. ISBN 978-0-7867-5095-5.
- Porter, Lewis; DeVito, Chris; Wild, David; Yasuhiro Fujioka; Wolf Schmaler (26 April 2013). The John Coltrane Reference. Routledge. ISBN 978-1-135-09794-3.
- Porter, Lewis (January 1998). John Coltrane: His Life and Music. University of Michigan Press. ISBN 978-0-472-10161-0.
- Smith, Martin (30 September 2003). John Coltrane: jazz, racism and resistance. Redwords. ISBN 978-1-872208-22-0.
- Thomas, J.C. (6 June 2012). Chasin the Trane. Knopf Doubleday Publishing Group. ISBN 978-0-307-82032-7.

Bing Crosby

- Giddins, Gary. Bing Crosby: A Pocketful of Dreams (2001)
- Giddins, Gary. Bing Crosby: Swinging on a Star (2018)

Miles Davis

- Carter, Ron; Terry, Clark; White, Lenny; Greg Tate; Ashley Kahn; Robin D. G. Kelley (19 November 2012). Miles Davis: The Complete Illustrated History. Voyageur Press. ISBN 978-0-7603-4262-6.
- Carr, Ian (1999). Miles Davis: The Definitive Biography. HarperCollins. ISBN 978-0-00-653026-8.
- Davis, Miles (15 September 1990). Miles. Simon and Schuster. ISBN 978-0-671-72582-2.
- Szwed, John (31 May 2012). So What: The Life of Miles Davis. Random House. ISBN 978-1-4481-0646-2.
- Waters, Keith (11 February 2011). The Studio Recordings of the Miles Davis Quintet, 1965-68. Oxford University Press. ISBN 978-0-19-983016-9.

Duke Ellington

- Bradbury, David (1 January 2005). Duke Ellington. Haus Publishing. p. 166. ISBN 978-1-904341-66-6.
- Cohen, Harvey G. (15 May 2010). Duke Ellington's America. University of Chicago Press. p. 349. ISBN 978-0-226-11265-7.
- Ellington, Duke (1976). Music is My Mistress. Da Capo Press. ISBN 978-0-306-80033-7.
- Franceschina, John (15 March 2001). Duke Ellington's Music for the Theatre. McFarland. ISBN 978-0-7864-5026-8.
- Pinkney, Andrea Davis (12 December 2006). Duke Ellington: The Piano Prince and His Orchestra. Turtleback Books. ISBN 978-1-4177-2883-1.
- Teachout, Terry. Duke. (2013)
- Tucker, Mark; Ellington, Duke (1993). The Duke Ellington Reader. Oxford University Press. ISBN 978-0-19-509391-9.
- Ulanov, Barry (1975). Duke Ellington. Da Capo Press. ISBN 978-0-306-70727-8.

Bill Evans

- Pettinger, Peter (August 2002). Bill Evans: How My Heart Sings. Yale University Press. ISBN 978-0-300-09727-6.
- Shadwick, Keith (2002). Bill Evans: Everything Happens to Me, a Musical Biography. Backbeat. ISBN 978-0-87930-708-0.

Ella Fitzgerald

- Fritts, Ron; Vail, Ken (1 January 2003). Ella Fitzgerald: The Chick Webb Years & Beyond. Scarecrow Press. ISBN 978-0-8108-4881-8.
- Gourse, Leslie (1998). The Ella Fitzgerald Companion: Seven Decades of Commentary. Schirmer Books. ISBN 978-0-02-864625-1.
- Kliment, Bud (1 January 1989). Ella Fitzgerald: Singer. Facts On File. ISBN 978-0-7910-0220-9.
- Krohn, Katherine E. (1 January 2001). Ella Fitzgerald: First Lady of Song. Twenty-First Century Books. ISBN 978-0-8225-4933-8.
- Nicholson, Stuart (22 July 2014). Ella Fitzgerald: A Biography of the First Lady of Jazz, Updated Edition. Routledge. ISBN 978-1-136-78814-7.
- Stone, Tanya Lee (2008). Ella Fitzgerald: A Twentieth Century Life. Viking. ISBN 978-0-670-06149-5.

Dizzy Gillespie

- Gillespie, Dizzy (2009). To Be, Or Not-- to Bop. U of Minnesota Press. ISBN 978-0-8166-6547-1.
- Golio, Gary (2016). Bird&Diz. Candlewick Press. ISBN 978-0-763-66660-6.
- Koster, Piet; Sellers, Chris (1988). Dizzy Gillespie: 1953-1987. Micrography. ISBN 978-90-6419-028-5.
- Shipton, Alyn (3 June 1999). Groovin' High : The Life of Dizzy Gillespie: The Life of Dizzy Gillespie. Oxford University Press. ISBN 978-0-19-534938-2.
- Vail, Ken (1 January 2003). Dizzy Gillespie: the Bebop Years, 1937-1952. Scarecrow Press. ISBN 978-0-8108-4880-1.

Benny Goodman

- Collier, James Lincoln (1989). Benny Goodman and the Swing Era. Oxford University Press. ISBN 978-0-19-505278-7.
- Connor, Donald Russell (1 January 1996). Benny Goodman: Wrappin' it Up. Scarecrow Press. ISBN 978-0-8108-3102-5.
- Connor, Donald Russell (1988). Benny Goodman: Listen to His Legacy. Scarecrow Press and the Institute of Jazz Studies. ISBN 978-0-8108-2095-1.
- Crowther, Bruce (1988). Benny Goodman. Apollo. ISBN 978-0-948820-04-5.
- Firestone, Ross (1 August 1994). Swing, Swing, Swing: The Life & Times of Benny Goodman. Norton. ISBN 978-0-393-31168-6.

Billie Holiday

- Alagna, Magdalena (1 May 2002). Billie Holiday. The Rosen Publishing Group. ISBN 978-0-8239-3640-3.
- Clarke, Donald (1 April 2009). Billie Holiday: Wishing on the Moon. Da Capo Press, Incorporated. ISBN 978-0-7867-3087-2.
- Golio, Gary (2017). Strange Fruit: Billie Holiday and the Power of a Protest Song. Millbrook. ISBN 978-1-512-43863-5.
- Greene, Meg (2007). Billie Holiday: A Biography. Greenwood Publishing Group. ISBN 978-0-313-33629-4.
- Margolick, David (27 June 2013). Strange Fruit: Billie Holiday, Café Society and an Early Cry for Civil Rights. Canongate Books. ISBN 978-1-78211-252-5.
- O'Meally, Robert (October 1993). Lady Day: The Many Faces of Billie Holiday. Arcade Publishing. ISBN 978-1-55970-200-3.

Pat Metheny

- Cooke, Mervyn. Pat Metheny: The ECM Years (2017)
- Niles, Richard. The Pat Metheny Interviews (2009)

Charles Mingus

- Dunkel, Mario (October 2012). Aesthetics of Resistance: Charles Mingus and the Civil Rights Movement. LIT Verlag Münster. ISBN 978-3-643-90254-2.
- Mingus, Charles (15 October 1998). Beneath the Underdog. Canongate Books. ISBN 978-1-84767-616-0.
- Mingus, Charles; Goodman, John F. (1 April 2013). Mingus Speaks. University of California Press. ISBN 978-0-520-27523-2.
- Santoro, Gene (20 July 2000). Myself When I am Real : The Life and Music of Charles Mingus: The Life and Music of Charles Mingus. Oxford University Press. ISBN 978-0-19-802578-8.

Thelonious Monk

- Fitterling, Thomas (1997). Thelonious Monk: His Life and Music. Berkeley Hills Books. ISBN 978-0-9653774-1-6.
- Gourse, Leslie (1998). Straight, No Chaser: The Life and Genius of Thelonious Monk. Music Sales Corporation. ISBN 978-0-8256-7229-3.
- Kelley, Robin (8 December 2009). Thelonious Monk: The Life and Times of an American Original. Simon and Schuster. ISBN 978-1-4391-9049-4.
- Solis, Gabriel (1 January 2007). Monk's Music: Thelonious Monk and Jazz History in the Making. University of California Press. ISBN 978-0-520-94096-3.

Charlie Parker

- Crouch, Stanley (24 September 2013). Kansas City Lightning. HarperCollins. ISBN 978-0-06-231406-2.
- Golio, Gary (2016). Bird&Diz. Candlewick Press. ISBN 978-0-763-66660-6.
- The Dial Recordings of Charlie Parker: A Discography. Greenwood Publishing Group. 1 January 1998. ISBN 978-0-313-29168-5.
- Miller, Mark (1989). Cool Blues Charlie Parker in Canada, 1953. Nightwood Editions. ISBN 0-88971-119-4.
- Priestley, Brian (1 May 2007). Chasin' the Bird: The Life and Legacy of Charlie Parker. Oxford University Press. ISBN 978-0-19-532709-0.
- Priestley, Brian (1984). Charlie Parker. Spellmount. ISBN 978-0-88254-906-4.
- Raschka, Christopher (1997). Charlie Parker Played Be Bop. Scholastic Inc. ISBN 978-0-531-07095-6.
- Reisner, Robert George (1977). Bird: The Legend of Charlie Parker. Da Capo Press. ISBN 978-0-306-80069-6.
- Woideck, Carl (1998). Charlie Parker: His Music and Life. University of Michigan Press. ISBN 0-472-08555-7.

Art Pepper

- Pepper, Art; Pepper, Laurie (9 September 2009). Straight Life: The Story of Art Pepper. Da Capo Press, Incorporated. ISBN 978-0-7867-5157-0.
- Selbert, Todd (1 January 2003). The Art Pepper Companion: Writings on a Jazz Original. Cooper Square Publishing, LLC. ISBN 978-0-8154-1265-6.

Sonny Rollins

- Nisenson, Eric (2 December 2000). Open Sky: Sonny Rollins and His World of Improvisation. Perseus Books Group. ISBN 978-0-306-80988-0.
- Palmer, Richard (2004). Sonny Rollins: The Cutting Edge. A&C Black. ISBN 978-0-8264-6916-8.
- Wilson, Peter Niklas (2001). Sonny Rollins: The Definitive Musical Guide. Berkeley Hills Books. ISBN 978-1-893163-06-5.
- The Jazz Style of Sonny Rollins: A Musical and Historical Perspective. Studio P/R. 1980. ISBN 978-1-4574-9416-1.

Fats Waller

- Kirkeby, Ed; Schiedt, Duncan P.; Traill, Sinclair (1975). Ain't Misbehavin': The Story of Fats Waller. Da Capo Press. ISBN 978-0-306-80015-3.
- Shipton, Alyn (1 April 2005). Fats Waller. A&C Black. ISBN 978-0-8264-7619-7.
- Waller, Fats (1 January 2001). Thomas Wright "Fats" Waller: Performances in Transcription, 1927–1943. A-R Editions. ISBN 978-0-89579-467-3.

== Instruction ==
- Baerman, Noah (1998). Mastering Jazz Keyboard. Alfred Music Publishing. ISBN 978-0-88284-914-0.
- Baker, David (1981). Jazz Pedagogy: A Comprehensive Method of Jazz Education for Teacher and Student. Alfred Music Publishing. ISBN 978-1-4574-2614-8.
- Berg, Shelly (1 October 2006). Alfred's Essentials of Jazz Theory, Teacher's Answer Key: Book & 3 CDs. Alfred Music. ISBN 978-0-7390-4263-2.
- Berliner, Paul F. (5 October 2009). Thinking in Jazz: The Infinite Art of Improvisation. University of Chicago Press. ISBN 978-0-226-04452-1.
- Coker, Jerry (1991). Elements of the jazz language for the developing improvisor. Alfred Music Publishing. ISBN 978-1-57623-875-2.
- Hill, Willie (January 2002). Jazz Pedagogy: The Jazz Educator's Handbook and Resource Guide. Alfred Music. ISBN 978-0-7579-9125-7.
- Jody, Fisher. Complete Jazz Guitar Method: Beginning Jazz Guitar. Alfred Music Publishing. ISBN 978-1-4574-0828-1.
- Levine, Mark (12 January 2011). The Jazz Piano Book. O'Reilly Media. ISBN 978-1-4571-0144-1.
- Levine, Mark (12 January 2011). The Jazz Theory Book. O'Reilly Media. ISBN 978-1-4571-0145-8.
- Marienthal, Eric (1 July 1997). Ultimate Jazz Play-Along (Jam with Eric Marienthal): B-Flat, Book & CD. Alfred Music. ISBN 978-1-57623-940-7.
- Munro, Doug (1999). The 21st Century Pro Method: Jazz Guitar/Swing to Bebop. Alfred Music Publishing. ISBN 978-0-7692-8931-1.
- Orta, Michael. Jazz Etudes for Piano. Alfred Music Publishing. ISBN 978-1-4574-0369-9.
- Porta, John La (1 April 1996). 10 Easy Jazz Duets: For Flute, Guitar, Violin, Vibraphone, Piano: C Edition. Alfred Music. ISBN 978-0-7692-3333-8.
- Prouty, Ken (2012). Knowing Jazz: Community, Pedagogy, and Canon in the Information Age. U. Press of Mississippi. ISBN 978-1-61703-164-9.
- Ramon, Ricker (27 November 1999). Pentatonic Scales for Jazz Improvisation. Alfred Music Publishing. ISBN 978-1-4574-9410-9.
- Rawlins, Robert; Bahha, Nor Eddine (1 January 2005). Jazzology: The Encyclopedia of Jazz Theory for All Musicians. Hal Leonard. ISBN 978-0-634-08678-6.
- Rizzo, Jacques (1 July 1997). Reading Jazz - Alto Sax: The New Method for Learning to Read Written Jazz Music. Alfred Music. ISBN 978-0-7692-1425-2.
- Russo, William (January 1961). Composing for the Jazz Orchestra. University of Chicago Press. ISBN 978-0-226-73209-1.
- Weir, Michele (1 December 2007). Jazz Piano Handbook: Essential Jazz Piano Skills for All Musicians. Alfred Music. ISBN 978-0-7390-4795-8.
- Weir, Michele (2005). Jazz singer's handbook: the artistry and mastery of singing jazz. Alfred Music Publishing. ISBN 978-0-7390-3387-6.
- Werner, Kenny (January 1996). Effortless Mastery. Jamey Aebersold Jazz. ISBN 978-1-56224-003-5.
- York, Alfred (1 November 2006). Andrew York's Jazz Guitar for Classical Cats: Improvisation: The Classical Guitarist's Guide to Jazz. Alfred Music. ISBN 978-0-7390-1133-1.
- Jazz improvisation: the best way to develop solos over classic changes : [for C instruments]. Alfred Music Publishing. 1996. ISBN 978-1-57623-654-3.
- For Saxes Only!: 10 Jazz Duets for Saxophone. Alfred Music Publishing. 1 April 2001. ISBN 978-0-7579-0483-7.

== Instruments – history ==
=== Drums ===
- Riley, Herlin; Vidacovich, Johnny; Thress, Dan (1995). New Orleans Jazz and Second Line Drumming. Alfred Music Publishing. ISBN 978-0-89724-921-8.

=== Guitar ===
- Barth, Joe (2006). Voices in Jazz Guitar. Pacific, MO: Mel Bay. ISBN 0786676795.
- Carlton, Jim (2009). Conversations with Great Jazz and Studio Guitarists. Pacific, MO: Mel Bay. ISBN 978-078665123-8.
- Sallis, James, ed. (1996). The Guitar in Jazz: An Anthology. Lincoln: Univ. of Nebraska Press. ISBN 9780803242500.
- Yanow, Scott (2013). The Great Jazz Guitarists: The Ultimate Guide. San Francisco: Backbeat. ISBN 978-1-61713-023-6.

=== Piano ===
- Taylor, Billy (1983). Jazz Piano: A Jazz History. W.C. Brown Co. Publishers. ISBN 978-0-697-09959-4.

=== Trumpet ===
- Barnhart, Scotty (2005). The World of Jazz Trumpet. Hal Leonard. ISBN 978-0-634-09527-6.

== Photography ==
- Berendt, Joachim-Ernst (1 December 1979). Jazz, a Photo History. Schirmer Books. ISBN 978-0-02-870290-2.
- Pinson, K. Heather (2010). The Jazz Image: Seeing Music Through Herman Leonard's Photography. U. Press of Mississippi. ISBN 978-1-60473-495-9.

== Record labels ==
- Kennedy, Rick (2013). Jelly Roll, Bix, and Hoagy: Gennett Records and the Rise of America's Musical Grassroots (Rev. & expanded ed.). Bloomington, Indiana: Indiana University Press. ISBN 978-0-253-00747-6.
- Kennedy, Rick; McNutt, Randy (1999). Little Labels, Big Sound: Small Record Companies and the Rise of American Music. Bloomington, Indiana: Indiana University Press. ISBN 978-0253214348.
