= Moacir =

Moacir, also spelled Moacyr (Portuguese pronunciation: [moa'siɾ] or [moa'siʁ]), is a Brazilian masculine given name of Indigenous origin (from the Tupi–Guarani languages) and a character of the Brazilian novel Iracema.

Notable people with the name include:

- Moacir Santos (1926-2006), Brazilian musician and composer, known for the jazz album Coisas
- Moacir Barbosa Nascimento (1921–2000), nicknamed Barbosa, Brazilian footballer
- Moacyr Claudino Pinto da Silva (born 1936), nicknamed Moacir or Moacyr, Brazilian former footballer
- Moacir Costa da Silva (born 1986), nicknamed Moacir, Brazilian footballer
- Moacyr Brondi Daiuto (1915–1994), Brazilian basketball coach
- Moacyr Filho Domingos Demiquei (born 1981), nicknamed Moacyr Filho or Nenê, Brazilian footballer
- Moacyr Grechi OSM (1936–2019), Brazilian Roman Catholic archbishop
- Moacyr José Vitti CSS (1940–2014), Roman Catholic archbishop
- Moacyr Scliar (1937–2011), Brazilian writer and physician
