= Saudade (Moacir Santos album) =

Studio album by Moacir Santos
- Released: 1974
- Recorded: March 5–6 & 12, 1974
- Genre: Jazz
- Length: 36:37
- Label: Blue Note
- Producer: Duke Pearson

Moacir Santos chronology
Maestro (1972)	Saudade (1974)	Carnival of the Spirits (1975)

Saudade is an album by Brazilian composer Moacir Santos recorded in 1974 and released on the Blue Note label.

== Reception ==
The Allmusic rating is 3 stars.

Professional ratings
Review scores
Source	Rating
Allmusic	3/5 stars

== Track listing ==
1. "Early Morning Love" (Santos, Yanna Cotti) - 3:25
2. "A Saudade Matta a Gente" (Antonio Almeida, J. de Barro) - 6:10
3. "Off and On" (Santos, Cotti) - 3:37
4. "The City of LA" (Mark Levine) - 3:38
5. "Suk Cha" (Santos) - 4:06
6. "Kathy" (Santos, Ray Evans, Jay Livingston) - 3:37
7. "Haply-Happy" (Santos, Petsye Powell) - 2:59
8. "Amphibious" (Santos, Assis) - 3:25
9. "This Life" (Santos, Cotti) - 2:33
10. "What's My Name" (Santos, Evans, Livingston) - 3:07

- Recorded at United Artists Studios in West Hollywood, California on March 5, 6 & 12, 1974

== Personnel ==
- Moacir Santos - alto saxophone, baritone saxophone, conductor, arranger
- Steve Huffsteter - trumpet, flugelhorn
- Benny Powell - trombone
- Morris Repass - bass trombone
- Sidney Muldrow - french horn
- Ray Pizzi - bassoon, alto saxophone, tenor saxophone, flute, piccolo
- Jerome Richardson - soprano saxophone, alto saxophone, tenor saxophone, baritone saxophone, flute, alto flute
- Mark Levine - piano, electric piano, arranger
- Lee Ritenour - guitar, electric guitar
- John Heard - bass, electric bass
- Harvey Mason - drums
- Mayuto Correa, Carmelo Garcia - conga, percussion
- Donald Alves, Mike Campbell, Jose Marino, Petsye Powell, Carmen Saveiros, Regina Werneck - backing vocals
