= Rhythmstick =

1990 album and video by Dizzy Gillespie

Studio album / video by Dizzy Gillespie and CTI Records All-Stars
- Released: 1990
- Genre: Jazz
- Label: CTI

Rhythmstick is a 1990 album and video by Dizzy Gillespie and CTI Records All-Stars.

== Video Track listing ==
1. "Barbados" (Charlie Parker)
2. "Friday Night at the Cadillac Club" (Bob Berg)
3. "Nana" (Moacir Santos)
4. "Caribe" (Michel Camilo)
5. "Softly, As in a Morning Sunrise" (Sigmund Romberg)
6. "Palisades in Blue" (Benny Golson)
7. "Colo De Rio" (Enio Flavio Mol and Marcelo Ferreira)
8. "Wamba" (Salif Keita)
9. "Quilombo" (Gilberto Gil and Wally Salomao)

== 1990 LP Track listing ==
1. "Caribe" (Michel Camilo)
2. "Friday Night at the Cadillac Club" (Bob Berg)
3. "Quilombo" (Gilberto Gil and Wally Salomao)
4. "Barbados" (Charlie Parker)
5. "Nana" (Moacir Santos)
6. "Softly, As in a Morning Sunrise" (Sigmund Romberg)
7. "Colo De Rio" (Enio Flavio Mol and Marcelo Ferreira)
8. "Palisades in Blue" (Benny Golson)
9. "Wamba" (Salif Keita)

== Personnel ==
In order, from VHS box and LP sleeve notes:

- Dizzy Gillespie - trumpet & rhythmstick
- Art Farmer - trumpet & flugelhorn
- Phil Woods - alto saxophone
- Bob Berg - tenor & soprano saxophone
- Airto Moreira - percussion & vocals
- Flora Purim - vocals
- Tito Puente - percussion
- Charlie Haden - bass
- Marvin "Smitty" Smith - drums
- Anthony Jackson - electric bass
- Bernard Purdie - drums
- John Scofield - electric guitar
- Robben Ford - electric guitar
- Romero Lubambo - acoustic guitar
- Hilton Ruiz - piano
- Jimmy McGriff - Hammond B3 organ
- Benny Golson - arranger & conductor, additional keyboards, synthesized bass
- Jim Beard - additional keyboard and synthesizer solos
- Randy Brecker - trumpet
- Jon Faddis - trumpet
- Amy Roslyn, Janice Pendarvis, Diana Moreira - additional vocals
