= Carnival of the Spirits =

Studio album by Moacir Santos
- Released: 1975
- Recorded: March 17–20, 1975
- Genre: Jazz
- Length: 32:17
- Label: Blue Note
- Producer: Dale Oehler

Moacir Santos chronology
Saudade (1974)	Carnival of the Spirits (1975)	Opus 3, No. 1 (1978)

Carnival of the Spirits is an album by Brazilian composer Moacir Santos recorded in 1975 and released on the Blue Note label.

== Track listing ==
All compositions by Moacir Santos except as indicated

1. "Quiet Carnival" (Moacir Santos, Mike Campbell) – 5:52
2. "Jequie" – 2:53
3. "Kamba" – 4:30
4. "Sampaguita" (Graham Dee, Jack Keller, Lora Kaye) – 3:08
5. "Coisa No. 2" – 4:38
6. "Tomorrow Is Mine" (Santos, Campbell) – 3:31
7. "Route ∞" – 3:32
8. "Anon" – 4:13
  - Recorded at The Record Plant in Los Angeles, California on March 17 (tracks 5 & 6), March 18 (tracks 3 & 7), March 19 (tracks 1 & 8) and March 20 (tracks 2 & 4), 1975

== Personnel ==
- Moacir Santos – vocals, alto saxophone, baritone saxophone, percussion, arranger
- Oscar Brashear, Mike Price, Jerry Rusch – trumpet
- George Bohanon, J.J. Johnson – trombone
- David Duke – French horn
- Ernie Watts – bass flute
- Jerome Richardson – soprano saxophone, alto flute
- Ray Pizzi – soprano saxophone, clarinet, bass clarinet
- Gary Foster – alto saxophone
- Don Menza – tenor saxophone, flute, alto flute
- Clare Fischer – piano
- Jerry Peters – organ
- Larry Nash – electric piano, clavinet
- Dennis Budimir, Dean Parks – guitar
- Chuck Domanico – bass
- Harvey Mason – drums
- Louis Alves, Paulinho Da Costa, Roberto Silva – percussion
- Lynda Lawrence – vocals
- Dale Oehler – arranger
