= Steppin' Into Beauty =

Studio album by Hilton Ruiz Trio / Quintet
- Released: 1982
- Recorded: February 7–8, 1977
- Studio: C.I. Recording Inc., NYC
- Genre: Jazz
- Length: 43:11
- Label: SteepleChase; SCS 1158
- Producer: Nils Winther

Hilton Ruiz chronology
New York Hilton (1977)	Steppin' Into Beauty (1982)	Live at Jazz Unité (1981)

Steppin' Into Beauty is an album by pianist Hilton Ruiz, collecting performances recorded in 1977 at the sessions that produced Excition and New York Hilton, which was released on the Danish label SteepleChase in 1982.

Professional ratings
Review scores
Source	Rating
AllMusic	4.5/5 stars
The Penguin Guide to Jazz Recordings	3/4 stars

== Track listing ==
1. "Origin" (Pharoah Sanders) – 9:59
2. "Steppin' into Beauty" (Rahsaan Roland Kirk) – 5:26
3. "The Last Profit" (Roy Brooks) – 7:20
4. "The Goal" (Hakim Jami) – 6:50
5. "Excition" (Frank Foster) – 13:33

== Personnel ==
- Hilton Ruiz – piano
- Richard Williams – trumpet (tracks 1, 3 & 5)
- Frank Foster – tenor saxophone (tracks 1, 3 & 5)
- Hakim Jami (tracks 2 & 4), Buster Williams (tracks 1, 3 & 5) – bass
- Roy Brooks (tracks 1, 3 & 5), Steve Solder (tracks 2 & 4) – drums
