= Maestro (Moacir Santos album) =

Studio album by Moacir Santos
- Released: 1972
- Recorded: September 29 and October 10 & 18, 1972
- Genre: Jazz
- Length: 36:46
- Label: Blue Note
- Producer: George Butler

Moacir Santos chronology
Opus 3, No. 1 (1968)	Maestro (1972)	Saudade (1974)

Maestro is an album by Brazilian composer Moacir Santos recorded in 1972 and released on the Blue Note label.

== Reception ==
The Allmusic review by Jason Ankeny awarded the album 3½ stars stating "For his Blue Note debut, Maestro, Brazilian composer Moacir Santos assiduously avoids his homeland's familiar bossa nova and samba rhythms, instead reinventing lesser-known idioms like baião and frevo to create his own complex yet pulsating signatures and cadences". The All About Jazz review by C. Andrew Hovan said "Without a doubt, Maestro established Santos as an artist to be reckoned with and while the record probably skirted just below the radar of the average jazz listener, two more Blue Notes would be in the offing".

Professional ratings
Review scores
Source	Rating
Allmusic	3.5/5 stars

== Track listing ==
All compositions by Moacir Santos except as indicated

1. "Nanã" (Santos, Mario Telles, Yanna Cotti)
2. "Bluishmen"
3. "Luanne" (Santos, Jay Livingston, Ray Evans)
4. "Astral Whine (An Elegy to Any War)"
5. "Mother Iracema"
6. "Kermis"
7. "April Child" (Santos, Livingston, Evans)
8. "The Mirror's Mirror"

- Recorded at A&R Studios in Los Angeles, California on September 29 and October 10 & 18, 1972

== Personnel ==
- Moacir Santos – baritone saxophone, vocals, percussion, arranger
- Oscar Brashear – trumpet
- Frank Rosolino – trombone
- David Duke – French horn
- Ray Pizzi – alto saxophone, soprano saxophone
- Don Menza – tenor saxophone, flute
- Hymie Lewak – piano
- Clare Fischer – organ
- Bill Henderson – electric piano
- Joe Pass – guitar
- John Heard – bass
- Sheila Wilkinson – vocals (Wilkerson)
- Reggie Andrews – arranger (track 1)
- Harvey Mason – drums
- Carmelo Garcia – percussion
