= Tito Puente =

American Latin jazz and mambo musician (1923–2000)

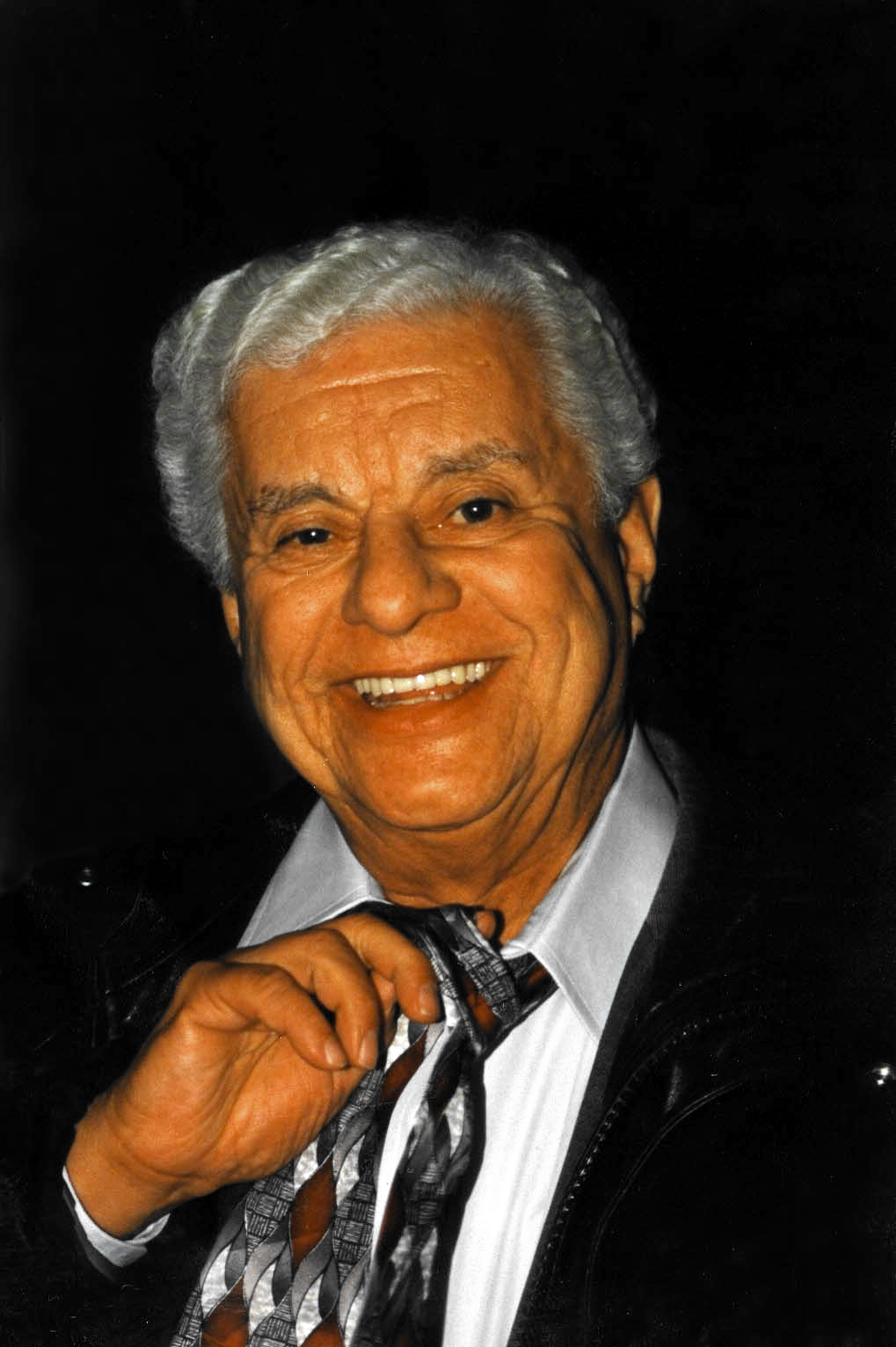
- Puente in 1996

Background information
- Born: Ernest Anthony Puente Jr. April 20, 1923; New York City, New York, U.S.
- Died: May 31, 2000 (aged 77) New York City, New York, U.S.
- Genres: Latin jazz; Cuban jazz; mambo
- Occupations: Musician; songwriter; record producer
- Instruments: Timbales; drums; percussion; vibraphone
- Years active: 1946–2000
- Labels: Tico; Fania; Sony Discos; RMM; Concord Picante
- Children: 3, including Audrey Puente

Ernest Anthony Puente Jr. (April 20, 1923 – May 31, 2000), commonly known as Tito Puente, was an American musician, songwriter, bandleader, timbalero, vibraphonist and record producer. He composed dance-oriented mambo and Latin jazz music. He was also known as "El Rey de los Timbales," or "The King of the Timbales."

Puente and his music have appeared in films including The Mambo Kings and Fernando Trueba's Calle 54. He guest-starred on television shows, including Sesame Street and The Simpsons episode "Who Shot Mr. Burns?".

== Early life ==
Puente was born on April 20, 1923, at Harlem Hospital Center in the New York borough of Manhattan, the son of Ernesto and Felicia Puente, Puerto Ricans living in New York City's Spanish Harlem. His family moved frequently, but he spent the majority of his childhood in Spanish Harlem. Puente's father was the foreman at a razor blade factory. His family called him Ernestito (Spanish diminutive for 'Ernest'), which became shortened to "Tito".

Puente was first introduced to music through the radio. Described as a hyperactive child, neighbors complained hearing seven-year-old Puente beating on pots and window frames, so his mother sent him to 25-cent piano lessons. He switched to percussion by the age of 10, drawing influence from jazz drummer Gene Krupa. He later created a song-and-dance duo with his sister Anna in the 1930s and intended to become a dancer, but an ankle tendon injury prevented him from pursuing dance as a career. Puente also learned from the trios and bambas that played at Plaza San Jose in old San Juan. He heard mambo (now called salsa) music and was influenced by its Afro-Cuban roots. By 13, Puente was considered a prodigy. When he was 16, he played with Ramon Oliver's band. When the drummer in Machito's band was drafted to the army, Puente subsequently took his place.

== Career ==
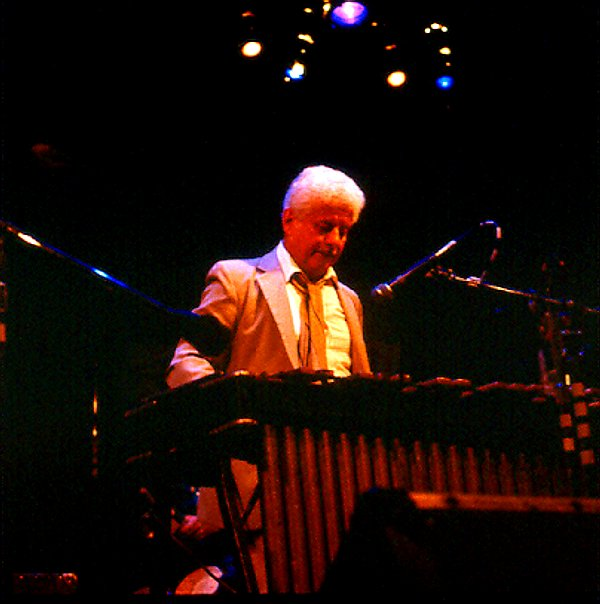
Puente at the Village Gate, in the 1980s

=== Styles and Influences ===
Puente had distinct Asian influences in his composition and arranging style, all of which came after his service during World War II. After finishing his time in the Navy, Puente attended the Juilliard School of Music to study conducting and orchestration. His conducting teacher was Japanese, further influencing the Asian elements in his compositions. Throughout the rest of his career, Puente traveled to Japan many times while on tour. He said that if it was not for war, he would have never been exposed to their music and culture.

"Even in war, [the power of] music, art, dancing, food… always eventually wins."

Puente's introduction to music was jazz drumming with an African American show drummer he remembers as Mr. Williams. During this time, he also learned acrobatic tap and ballroom dancing. Puente introduced new techniques to some percussion instruments that would help redefine how they were used in music. For example, while learning vibraphone and marimba, he introduced piano techniques. He also applied his jazz training to timbales, which was unlike anything that had been done before. This helped redefine the timbales as a solo instrument.

=== Time in the Navy ===
Puente served in the Navy for three years during World War II after being drafted in 1942. He was discharged with a Presidential Unit Citation for serving in nine battles on the escort aircraft carrier USS Santee (CVE-29) where his duties included playing alto saxophone and clarinet in the ship's big band as well as occasionally drum set, piano during mess hall, acting as the ship's bugler, and serving as a machine gunner in the battles of Leyte and Midway. The G.I. Bill allowed him to study music at Juilliard School of Music, where he completed his formal education in conducting, orchestration, and theory after three years. Puente described his time in the Navy as, "What you normally study in a four-year music conservatory, but in three months… And it was all done with military discipline… it was intense."

Puente was the ship's bugler. Whenever warming up he would play general quarters. One day he forgot to turn off the microphone, leading everyone to believe there was an attack. He hid below deck for a few days due to the anger from crew members for the false alarm. Puente said his worst time in the Navy was every time he had to play taps for someone who was killed.

While aboard the Santee, Puente expanded his compositional skills by learning how to arrange for big bands given the extra time he had. He was coached by Lieutenant Sweeney who he came to be friends with. Sweeney referred to Puente as "Lil' Ernie" because of his height. The first chart Puente arranged was 'El Botellero' which he sent to Machito and Mario Bauza in New York City.

=== Post-Navy ===
Puente was offered a delayed return to the ship so he could go to different parts of the Orient (LINK). He was given several months to stop in each port city to learn about music, food, and customs. During this time he learned a lot about Asian music, experienced the culture, and learned how they apply music theory in their compositions. He learned that they use chord voicings in fourths, wrote melodies based on scales, and more. This influenced pieces such as "Hong Kong Mambo," "Mambo Buddha," and "Picadillo." After finishing his time in the Navy, Puente attended the Juilliard School of Music to study orchestration and conducting.

Bands wanted Puente playing up front rather than in the back like most big bands. Not only did he play in a unique and revolutionary way, he also put on a show for the audiences. Sometimes he was the show. Puente was also a popular arranger given his background and the influence of past mentors. By 1948, Puente started his own group.

We play jazz with the Latin touch, that's all, you know.

During the 1950s, Puente was at the height of his popularity and helped to bring Cuban and Caribbean sounds like mambo, son, and cha-cha-chá, to mainstream audiences. His album Dance Mania was released in 1958.

Among his compositions is the cha-cha-chá song "Oye Cómo Va" (1963), popularized by Latin rock musician Carlos Santana and later interpreted, among others, by Julio Iglesias, Irakere and Celia Cruz. In 1969, he received the key to the City of New York from former Mayor John Lindsay. In 1992, he was inducted into the National Congressional Record and in 1993, he received the James Smithson Bicentennial Medal from the Smithsonian Institution.

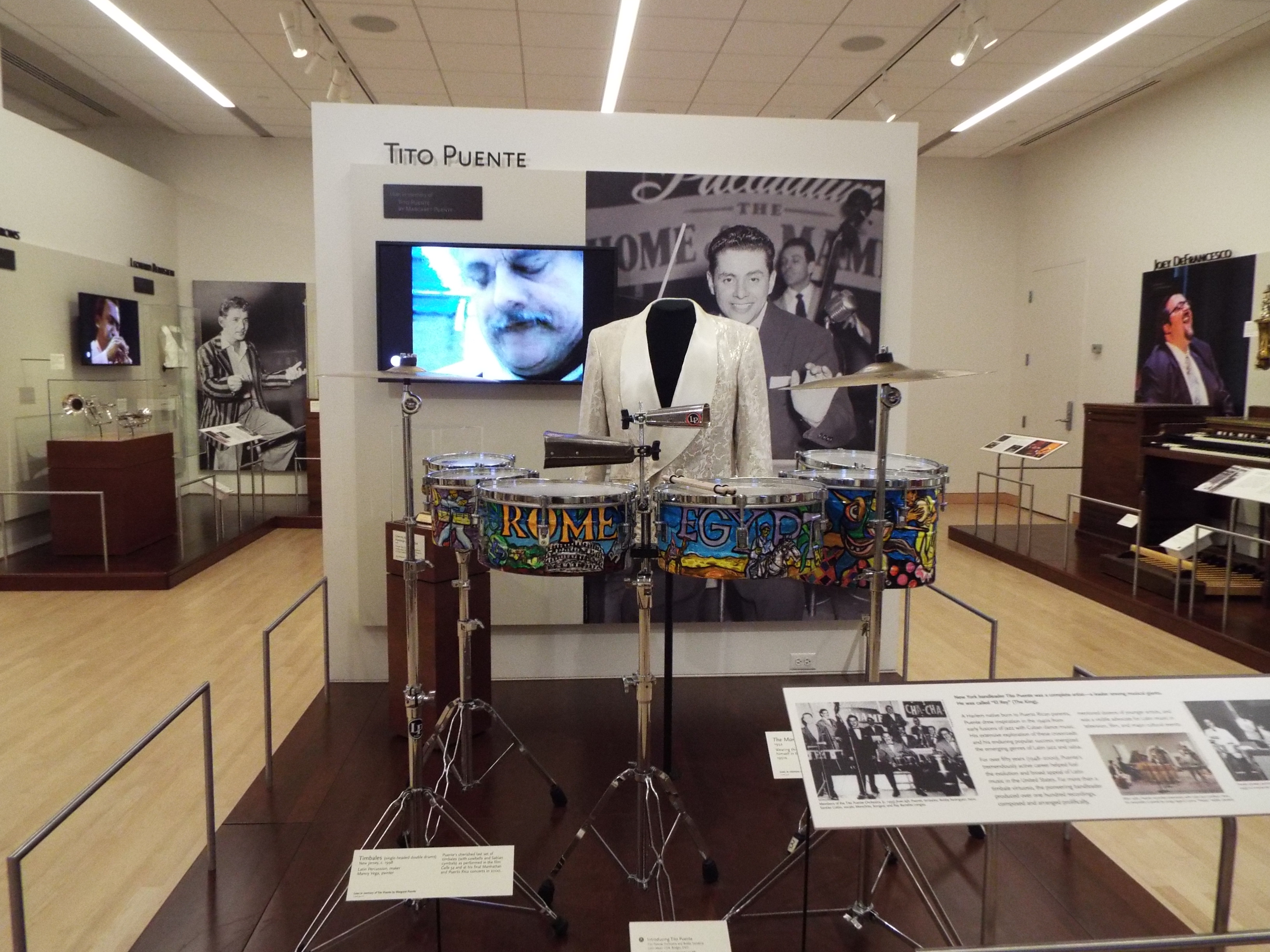
Puente's timbales in the Tito Puente exhibit in the Artist Gallery of the Musical Instrument Museum of Phoenix

=== The Palladium Era ===
Puente is one of the subjects of La Época – The Palladium Era, a documentary about the Palladium era in New York, Cuban music and rhythms, mambo and salsa as dances and music and much more. The documentary discusses many of Puente's, as well as Arsenio Rodríguez's, contributions and features interviews with some of the musicians Puente recorded with.

Beginning in the 1950s, Americans fell in love with mambo. In New York City, the Palladium Ballroom was the "Home of the Mambo." It had been converted from the Alma Dance Studio into a nightclub by Tommy Morton in 1946.

Machito, who was popular and sold lots of records, was hired along with musicians to play all kinds of music for the dancers. Machito sought to bring in black and Latino consumers from Harlem that normally frequented the Savoy or Park Place Ballroom. Machito and Morton hired Federico Pagani, leader of the Happy Boys, to promote Latino dance.

Their next step was starting a Sunday promotion called the Blen Blen Club, and they gave away discount cards at both subway stations and bus stops. By the first Sunday, there was a mob waiting in line at four o'clock in the afternoon. On this night six bands were hired with Noro Morales and Jose Curbelo headlining. These bands brought in Latino, Black, and White people. This launched the Palladium era.

Afro-Cubans were the first band to go to the Palladium and bring uptown beats and dancing to Broadway. This was the first venue where the children of immigrants came to dance to music that was not what their parents listened to. On Broadway and 7th, 53rd and 54th street had to be closed down because of the long lines around the block. Wednesday's and Friday-Sunday's were dedicated to the mecca of Latin music. Given that this was post-World War II, people were happily spending money given the economic boom and the desire to have a good time.

The Palladium needed multiple bands to keep the Blen Blen Club going since Machito was not always available. Pagani knew Puente from the Happy Boys and heard an "arousing" tune Puente was working on that "made [his] blood turn cold." Machito hired Puente to play on Sundays and had him put together a group called the Picadilly Boys.

People also enjoyed seeing the rivalry between Machito, Tito Puente, and Tito Rodriguez. Puente and Rodriguez constantly wanted to outdo each other and individually improved to increase the competition.

The Palladium was the home of the mambo until it closed in 1966.

== Personal life and death ==
Puente's oldest son Ron Puente is from a first marriage to Mirta Sanchez. Richard "Richie" Puente was the percussionist in the 1970s and 1980 funk band Foxy. Puente's youngest son, Tito Puente Jr., has performed and recorded many of Puente's songs. His daughter Audrey Puente is a television meteorologist for WNYW and WWOR-TV in New York City.

Puente was greatly appreciated when he performed in 1999 in Trinidad at the World Beat Concert, alongside notables such as South African Hugh Masakela and Senegalese Baba Maal.

After a show in Puerto Rico on May 31, 2000, Puente suffered a massive heart attack and was flown to New York City for surgery to repair a heart valve, but complications developed, and he died later that night. He was posthumously awarded the Grammy Lifetime Achievement Award in 2003. After he died, Puente's local community in New York City celebrated him. He was well known within his community because of his involvement. He would go up to people who were jamming and playing street music (music everyday people listened and danced to). He called himself a street musician.

== Awards and recognition ==
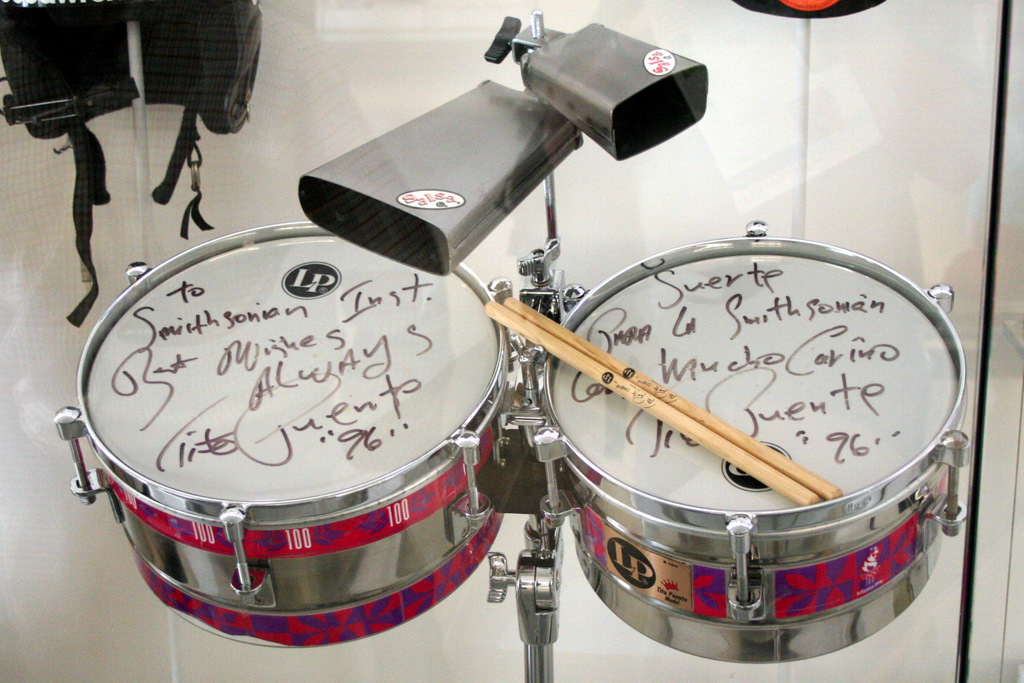
Timbales on display at the Smithsonian

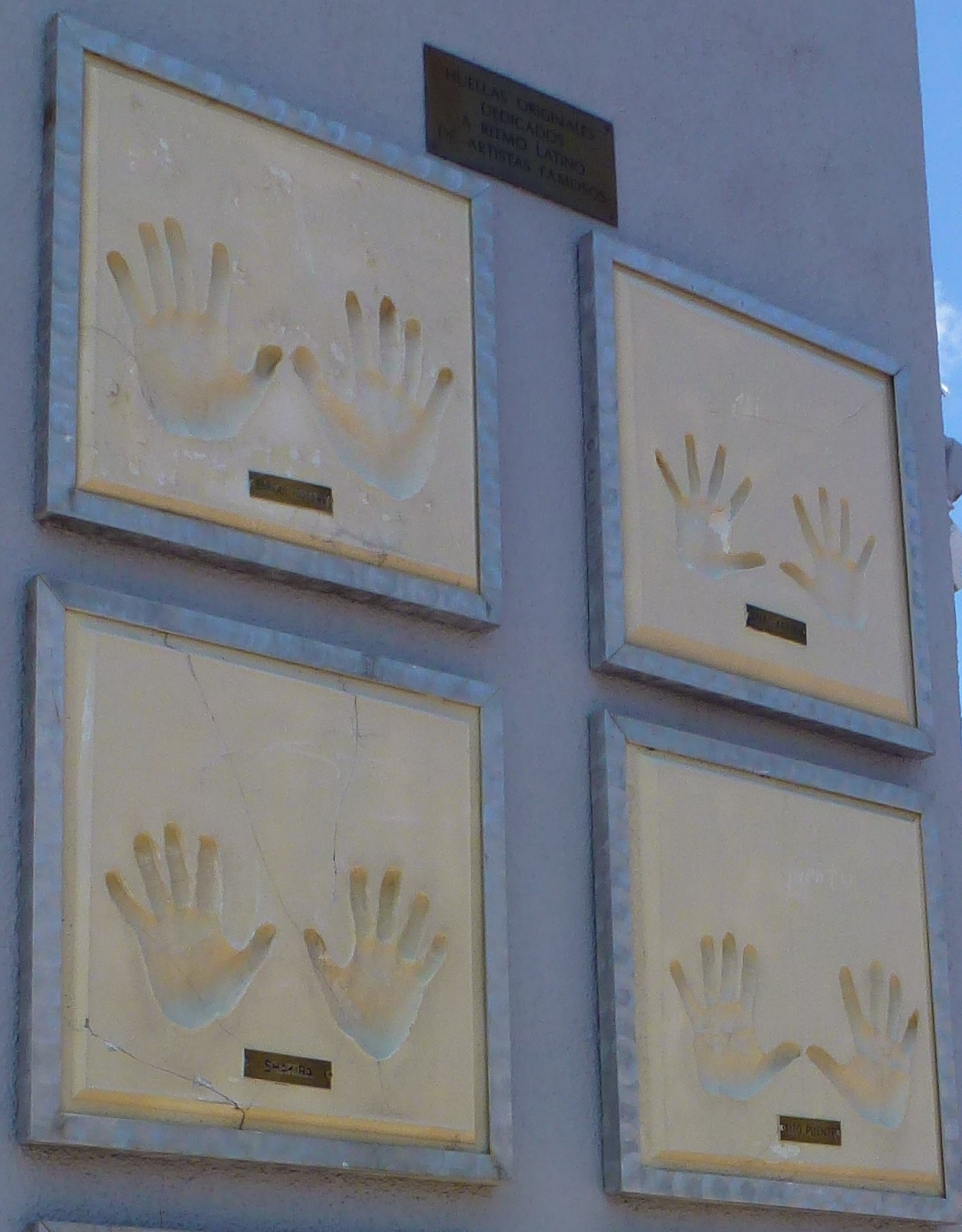
Tito Puente's handprints at Ritmo Latino's San Fernando Mall.

- In 1995, Puente received the Billboard Latin Music Lifetime Achievement Award.
- On September 10, 2007, a United States Post Office in Spanish Harlem was named after him at a ceremony presided over by House Ways and Means Committee Chair Charles Rangel and Rep. José Serrano.
- An amphitheater was named after him at Luis Muñoz Marín Park, next to the Roberto Clemente Coliseum, in San Juan, Puerto Rico.
- In 1995, Puente was awarded an Honorary Doctorate of Music from Berklee College of Music.
- Puente performed at the closing ceremonies at the 1996 Summer Olympics in Atlanta, Georgia. The timbales he used are displayed at the National Museum of American History in Washington, D.C.
- In 1997, he was awarded the National Medal of Arts.
- In 1990, he received a Star on the Hollywood Walk of Fame.
- In 1984, he received an honorary Decree from the Los Angeles City Council.
- On June 5, 2005, Puente was honored by Union City, New Jersey with a star on the Walk of Fame at Union City's Celia Cruz Park.
- In 1999, he was inducted into the International Latin Music Hall of Fame.
- On May 19, 1999, he received an honorary Mus.D degree from Columbia University.
- On August 20, 2000, East 110th Street in Spanish Harlem was named 'Tito Puente Way.' Whenever anyone asked where Puente came from, he always said 110th street.
- In 2011, the US Postal Service issued a commemorative postage stamp in his likeness as part of their Latin Legends series.
- On October 11, 2022, Puente was honored with a Google Doodle in honor of Hispanic Heritage Month.
- In 2025, Puente was inducted into the DownBeat Jazz Hall of Fame.

== Discography ==
=== As leader ===
- Mambos Vol. 1 & Vol. 2 (10" LP's, 1951) Tico
- Mambos Vol. 3 & Vol. 4 (10" LP's, 1952) Tico
- Mambos Vol. 5 & King of the Mambo, Vol. 6 (10" LP's, 1953) Tico
- Mamborama (1955) Tico
- Puente In Percussion (1956) Tico
- Cha Cha Cha's For Lovers (1956) Tico
- Cuban Carnival (1956) RCA Victor
- Night Beat (1957) RCA Victor
- Top Percussion (1958) RCA Victor
- Herman's Heat & Puente's Beat! with Woody Herman (1958) Everest (reissued in 2001 as Herman Meets Puente)
- Dance Mania (1958) RCA Victor
- Dancing Under Latin Skies (1959)
- Mucho Cha-Cha (1959)
- Tambo (1960) RCA Victor
- Cha Cha With Tito Puente at Grossinger's (1960) RCA Victor
- El Rey: Bravo (1962) Tico
- Tito Puente Swings, The Exciting Lupe Sings (1965)
- El Rey (The King) (1968) Tico
- El Rey: Tito Puente & His Latin Ensemble (1984) Concord Picante
- Mambo Diablo (1985) Concord Picante
- Sensacion (1986) Concord Picante
- Un Poco Loco (1987) Bellaphon
- Goza Mi Timbal (1989) Concord Picante
- Tito's Idea (1995) Tropi Jazz / RMM
- Jazzin' (with India) (1996) Tropi Jazz / RMM
- Percussion's King (1997)
- Selection of Mambo & Cha Cha Cha (1997)
- 50 Years of Swing (1997)
- Tito Meets Machito: Mambo Kings (1997)
- Cha Cha Cha Rumba Beguine (1998)
- Dance Mania '99: Live at Birdland (1998)
- The Very Best of Tito Puente (1998)
- Timbalero Tropical (1998)
- Yambeque (1998)
- Absolute Best (1999)
- Carnival (1999)
- Colección original (1999)
- Golden Latin Jazz All Stars: In Session (1999)
- Latin Flight (1999)
- Latin Kings (1999)
- Lo mejor de lo mejor (1999)
- Mambo Birdland (1999)
- Special Delivery featuring Maynard Ferguson (1996)
- Rey (2000)
- His Vibes & Orchestra (2000)
- Cha Cha Cha for Lovers (2000)
- Homenaje a Beny Moré Vol. 3 (2000) featuring Celia Cruz
- Dos ídolos. Su música (2000)
- Tito Puente y su Orquesta Mambo (2000)
- The Complete RCA Recordings. Vol. 1 (2000)
- The Best of the Concord Years (2000)
- Por fin (Finally) (2000)
- Party with Puente! (2000)
- Masterpiece/Obra maestra (2000) with Eddie Palmieri
- Mambo Mambo (2000)
- Mambo King Meets the Queen of Salsa (2000)
- Latin Abstract (2000)
- Kings of Mambo (2000)
- Cha Cha Cha for Lovers (2000)
- The Legends Collection: Tito Puente & Celia Cruz (2001)
- The Complete RCA Recordings, Vol. 2 (2001)
- RCA Recordings (2001)
- Puente caliente (2001)
- The Best of... (2001)
- King of Mambo (2001)
- El Rey: Pa'lante! Straight! (2001)
- Cocktail Hour (2001)
- Selection. King of Mambo (2001)
- Undisputed (2001)
- Fiesta (2002)
- Colección Diamante (2002)
- Tito Puente y Celia Cruz (2002)
- Live at the Playboy Jazz Festival (2002)
- King of Kings: The Very Best of Tito Puente (2002)
- Hot Timbales! (2002)
- Dr. Feelgood (2002)
- Carnaval de éxitos (2002)
- Caravan Mambo (2002)
- We Love Salsa (2006)
- Quatro: The Definitive Collection (2012)

=== As sideman ===
With Dizzy Gillespie

- Rhythmstick (1990)

With Benny Golson

- Remembering Clifford (Milestone, 1998)

With Quincy Jones

- Quincy Plays for Pussycats (Mercury, 1959–65 [1965])

With Hilton Ruiz

- Rhythm in the House (RMM, 1976 [1998])

With Sonny Stitt

- The Matadors Meet the Bull (Roulette, 1965)

With Bobby Sanabria

- ¡NYC Aché! (Flying Fish Records, 1993)

== Filmography ==
=== Selected feature films ===
- Armed and Dangerous (1986) as Band Leader
- Radio Days (1987) as Latin Bandleader
- The Mambo Kings (1992) as Himself

=== Documentaries ===
- Tito Puente: The King of Latin Music (2000)
- Profiles Featuring Tito Puente Jr. (2007)
- Latin Knights (2005)
- Calle 54 (2000)

=== Concert films ===
- Tito Puente – Live in Montreal (Montreal Jazz Festival) (1983) (2003)
- Tito Puente – Palladium Days (Newport Jazz Festival) (1997)
- Tito Puente - The Mambo King - 100th LP Live [DVD] (1997)

=== The Simpsons ===
Puente appeared in the two-part whodunit drama "Who Shot Mr. Burns?" in the sixth season finale and seventh season premiere of American comedy cartoon show The Simpsons in 1995. In the shows, Puente joins Springfield Elementary School as a music teacher after the school discovers it is located over an oil well. However, Mr. Burns manages to pump the oil first, which makes him the legal owner of the well. This causes the school to fall into debt with budget cuts to the music and maintenance departments, causing Puente to lose his job. When Burns is later shot, Puente becomes one of the prime suspects but manages to clear himself by performing one of his songs for Chief Wiggum. Seven alternative endings were filmed of various characters shooting Burns; Puente is one of the alternates. Although all endings were animated, the ending of Maggie Simpson shooting Burns was the ending chosen to air.

The Emmy-nominated song "Señor Burns" from the episode is featured on both the 1997 album Songs in the Key of Springfield and the 1999 album Go Simpsonic with The Simpsons.

== See also ==
- List of people from Harlem
