= Afro Blue Band =

American jazz ensemble

Afro Blue Band was an American jazz ensemble who released one album.

== Personnel ==
- Arthur Barron
- Steve Berrios (drums)
- Lionel Cole
- Glen Cronkhite
- Jerry Gonzalez (trumpet)
- Mark Levine (piano)
- Dave Liebman (saxophone)
- Mel Martin
- Melton Mustafa (trumpet)
- Steve Neil
- Phoenix Rivera
- Hilton Ruiz (piano)
- Papo Vasquez
- Nicole Yarling

== Discography ==
- 1995: Impressions (Milestone Records)
