= Audrey Puente =

American meteorologist (born 1970)

- Born: March 3, 1970 (age 56); New York City, United States
- Education: Syracuse University
- Occupation: television meteorologist
- Spouse: Jay Thompson (m. 2004)
- Children: 3
- Family: Tito Puente (father); Tito Puente Jr. (brother)

Audrey Puente (born March 3, 1970) is an American meteorologist. She brings the weather for the weekend news at 6 and 10 p.m. on WNYW in New York City. She also fills in on Good Day New York.

== Early life and education ==
Was born to mother Margie and father Tito Puente, a musician, songwriter and record producer. She is the sister of musician Tito Puente, Jr.

She studied speech communication at Syracuse University and served an apprenticeship at Hunter College. She received her Masters of Science in Geosciences with an emphasis on meteorology from Mississippi State University.

== Career ==
Audrey Puente is a television meteorologist, news personality, and emcee based in New York City.[3]�[4]� She is also known as the daughter of the late Latin music legend Tito Puente.[7]� In the mid-1990s, Puente worked as a meteorologist for WJCL and WTGS in Savannah, as well as for WAPT in Jackson.[2]� These early forecasting roles helped establish her career in broadcast meteorology and provided experience in diverse weather markets across the southeastern United States.[2]� In 1999, she joined WNBC as the station's weekend morning meteorologist.[6]� Her move to New York marked a significant advancement in her career, placing her in the nation's largest television market and increasing her visibility among viewers.[6]� Puente later moved to WCBS-TV, where she delivered weather forecasts for Channel 2 News This Morning and CBS 2 News at Noon.[2]� During her tenure at WCBS-TV, she also periodically filled in for Dave Price on CBS's The Early Show, expanding her presence to a national audience.[2]� On January 1, 2007, WCBS hired John Elliott to take her position.[2]� In January 2007, Puente succeeded veteran meteorologist Storm Field as the chief meteorologist at WWOR-TV.[2]� She served as the station's primary meteorologist until July 2013, when WWOR canceled its evening newscast.[2]� During this period, she became one of the most familiar weather broadcasters in the New York metropolitan area, providing coverage of major storms and regional weather events.[2]� In late 2012, Puente joined WNYW as the station's weekend meteorologist and principal fill-in meteorologist while continuing her work at WWOR.[2]� Her responsibilities included forecasting for FOX 5 New York broadcasts and substituting for the station's chief weather anchors when needed.[2]� In 2016, Puente expanded beyond weather broadcasting when she and news anchor Dari Alexander co-hosted The D&A Show, a lifestyle and entertainment program on WNYW.[5]� Although the program was short-lived, it highlighted her versatility as an on-air television personality and demonstrated her ability to engage audiences outside of traditional weather reporting.[5]� Throughout her career, Puente has combined meteorological expertise with a strong on-camera presence, establishing herself as a respected weather forecaster and television personality in the New York media market.[3]�[4]� In addition to her broadcasting work, she has appeared as a public speaker, event host, and emcee, further broadening her role in the media and entertainment industries.[3]�[4]�

== Personal life ==
In September 2000, Puente accepted an award at the inaugural Latin Grammy Awards ceremony in Los Angeles on behalf of her father, who had died in June of that year.

Puente has been married to Jay Thompson since September 18, 2004. She has three children.
