= Coisas =

Studio album by Moacir Santos
- Released: 1965
- Recorded: 1965
- Genre: Jazz
- Length: 36:46
- Label: Forma
- Producer: Roberto Quartin

Moacir Santos chronology
Coisas (1965)	Maestro (1972)

Coisas is an album by Brazilian composer Moacir Santos recorded in 1965 and released on the Forma record label. The album was listed by Ben Ratliff in his 100 most important recordings and by Rolling Stone in their 100 Greatest Brazilian Music Records.

Professional ratings
Review scores
Source	Rating
Allmusic	4.5/5 stars

== Reception ==
Although the album was not met with acclaim when first released, it has gone on to receive praise. The New York Times described the album as "one of the great accomplishments of modern Brazilian music". Writing for the Village Voice, Larry Blumenfeld called the album a "brilliant record". Ben Ratliff wrote that the album sounds like it was a mixture of West Coast jazz and samba and the arrangements on Blue Note recordings. Ratliff had earlier described the album as "a brilliant unification of large-ensemble jazz arranging, wickedly persuasive songwriting and Afro-Brazilian rhythm." The Allmusic review by Thom Jurek awarded the album 4½ stars, writing that the album "melds the various tonalities and flavors of creative jazz to the heart of Brazil's folkloric and emergent musical traditions."

Original copies of the album are hard to find with records selling for large amounts of money.

The song “Coisa No. 5” was later given lyrics by Mario Telles and renamed “Nanã”. The song has been recorded by over 100 artists including Edison Machado, Eumir Deodato and Sergio Mendes.

== Track listing ==
1. Coisa nº 4 (Moacir Santos) - 04:03
2. Coisa nº 10 (Mário Telles - Moacir Santos) - 02:47
3. Coisa nº 5 (Mário Telles - Moacir Santos) - 02:27
4. Coisa nº 3 (Moacir Santos) - 02:20
5. Coisa nº 2 (Moacir Santos) - 02:43
6. Coisa nº 9 (Moacir Santos) 04:57
7. Coisa nº 6 (Moacir Santos)
8. Coisa nº 7 (Moacir Santos) - 03:06
9. Coisa nº 1 (Clóvis Mello - Moacir Santos) - 03:00
10. Coisa nº 8 (Regina Werneck - Moacir Santos) - 03:08

== Personnel ==
- Moacir Santos - Baritone Saxophone
- Dulcilando Pereira - Alto Saxophone
- Jorge Ferreira Da Silva - Alto Saxophone
- Geraldo Medeiros - Baritone Saxophone
- Gabriel Bezerra - Bass
- Armando Pallas - Bass Trombone
- Giorgio Bariola - Cello
- Peter Dautsberg - Cello
- Watson Clis - Cello
- Wilson Das Neves - Drums
- Alberto Soluri - Engineer
- Nicolino Cópia - Flute
- Geraldo Vaspar - Guitar
- Wadi Gebara Netto - Music Director, Recording Supervisor
- Elias Ferreira - Percussion
- Chaim Lewak - Piano, Organ
- Luiz Bezerra - Tenor Saxophone
- Edmundo Maciel - Trombone
- João Gerônimo Meneze - Trumpet
- Júlio Barbosa - Trumpet
- Claudio Das Neves - Vibraphone
