= Rhythm in the House =

Studio album by Hilton Ruiz with Tito Puente
- Released: 1998
- Recorded: 1998
- Genre: Jazz
- Length: 36:39
- Labels: TropiJazz; RMD 82255
- Producers: Hilton Ruiz, Jack Hooke

Hilton Ruiz chronology
Island Eyes (1997)	Rhythm in the House (1998)	Hilton Ruiz Songbook (2003)

Rhythm in the House is an album by pianist Hilton Ruiz with special guest Tito Puente recorded in 1998 and released on TropiJazz label, a subsidiary of the Latin music label, RMM.

== Reception ==
Professional ratings
Review scores
Source	Rating
AllMusic	4/5 stars

The AllMusic review by Stephen Thomas Erlewine called it "a kinetic, entertaining record that proves Latin jazz is not a static form" stating "while not every song has a memorable melody, it's all infectious Latin dance music that proves Ruiz' versatility".

== Track listing ==
All compositions by Hilton Ruiz.

1. "La Conga Libre" – 5:31
2. "Old Arrival" – 5:22
3. "I'll Be There for You" – 6:30
4. "Rhythm in the House" – 4:05
5. "Give Her All Your Love" – 4:10
6. "Soul Traveler" – 4:40
7. "Michael's Mambo" – 6:21

== Personnel ==
- Hilton Ruiz – piano
- Tito Puente – timbales, vibraphone
- Rubén Rodriguez – bass
- Richie Flores – percussion
- Other unidentified musicians
