= New York Hilton (album) =

Studio album by Hilton Ruiz Trio
- Released: 1978
- Recorded: February 8, 1977
- Studio: C.I. Recording Inc., NYC
- Genre: Jazz
- Length: 44:28
- Label: SteepleChase; SCS 1094
- Producer: Nils Winther

Hilton Ruiz chronology
Excition (1977)	New York Hilton (1978)	Steppin' Into Beauty (1977)

New York Hilton is an album by pianist Hilton Ruiz recorded in 1977 and released on the Danish label, SteepleChase.

Professional ratings
Review scores
Source	Rating
AllMusic	4/5 stars
The Penguin Guide to Jazz Recordings	3/4 stars

== Track listing ==
All compositions by Hilton Ruiz except where noted.

1. "Blues for Mary Lou" – 7:28
2. "Vierd Lullaby" (Babs Gonzales) – 6:22
3. "Midtown Madness" – 4:22
4. "African Ripples" (Fats Waller) – 6:37
5. "Libertad Ahorra" (Kiane Zawadi) – 5:19
6. "New York Hilton" – 7:14
7. "Stepping into Beauty" (Rahsaan Roland Kirk) – 7:08 Additional track on CD

== Personnel ==
- Hilton Ruiz – piano
- Hakim Jami – bass
- Steve Solder – drums
