= Piano Man (Hilton Ruiz album) =

Studio album by Hilton Ruiz Trio
- Released: 1975
- Recorded: July 10, 1975
- Studios: C.I. Recording Inc., NYC
- Genre: Jazz
- Length: 53:27
- Labels: SteepleChase; SCS 1036
- Producer: Nils Winther

Hilton Ruiz chronology
| Piano Man (1975) | Excition (1977) |

Piano Man is the debut album led by pianist Hilton Ruiz recorded in 1975 and released on the Danish label, SteepleChase.

== Reception ==
Professional ratings
Review scores
| Source | Rating |
|---|---|
| AllMusic | 4/5 stars |
| The Penguin Guide to Jazz Recordings | 3/4 stars |

The AllMusic review by Michael G. Nastos called it "First-rate".

== Track listing ==
1. "One for Hakim" (Hilton Ruiz) – 4:15
2. "Misty Thursday" (Duke Jordan) – 11:12
3. "Medi II" (Mary Lou Williams) – 4:30
4. "Straight Street" (John Coltrane) – 3:57
5. "Big Foot" (Charlie Parker) – 10:40
6. "Arrival" (Ruiz) – 8:10
7. "Giant Steps" (Coltrane) – 10:29 Additional track on CD

== Personnel ==
- Hilton Ruiz – piano
- Buster Williams – bass
- Billy Higgins – drums
