= Hilton Ruiz =

Puerto Rican-American jazz pianist

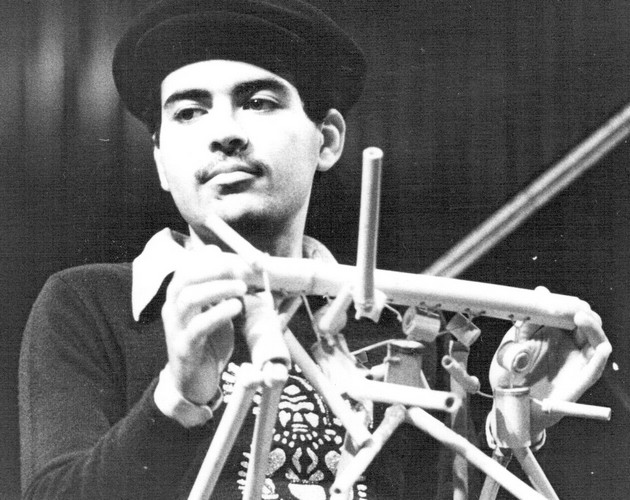
- Hilton Ruiz in November 1976

Background information
- Born: May 29, 1952; New York City, U.S.
- Died: June 6, 2006 (aged 54) New Orleans, U.S.
- Genres: Jazz
- Occupation: Musician
- Instrument: Piano
- Years active: 1960–2006

Hilton Ruiz (May 29, 1952 – June 6, 2006) was an American jazz pianist in the Afro-Cuban jazz mold, but was also a talented bebop player. He was of Puerto Rican descent.

== Biography ==
Born in New York City, Ruiz began playing piano at the age of five after being inspired by Duke Ellington. At the age of eight he performed Mozart at Carnegie Hall.

In high school Ruiz studied jazz piano with Mary Lou Williams. In 1973 he was a sideman for Roland Kirk, then later for Clark Terry. He also worked with Betty Carter, Tito Puente, and Mongo Santamaría. He co-wrote a music instruction book, Jazz and How to Play It. He appeared on the soundtrack to Woody Allen's Crimes and Misdemeanors.

On May 19, 2006, Ruiz was found unconscious on Bourbon Street in New Orleans, where he had gone to shoot a video to promote a recently recorded project with M27 Records benefiting the victims of Hurricane Katrina entitled "Goin' Back to New Orleans". The police filed a report that he had injured himself in an accidental fall. Ruiz was hospitalized in a coma and died without regaining consciousness a week after his 54th birthday. Ruiz was a resident of Teaneck, New Jersey.

He was buried at Saint Raymond's Cemetery in New York City.

== Discography ==
=== As leader ===
- 1975 Piano Man (SteepleChase)
- 1977 Excition (SteepleChase)
- 1977 New York Hilton (SteepleChase)
- 1977 Steppin' Into Beauty (SteepleChase) released 1982
- 1981 Live at Jazz Unitè (Jazz Unite)
- 1984 Cross Currents (Vintage Jazz)
- 1987 Ensemble (Novus/RCA)
- 1987 Something Grand (Novus/RCA)
- 1988 El Camino (The Road) (Novus)
- 1989 Strut (Novus)
- 1989 Doin' It Right (Novus)
- 1991 A Moment's Notice (Novus)
- 1992 Manhattan Mambo (Telarc)
- 1992 Live at Birdland (Candid)
- 1993 Heroes (Telarc)
- 1995 Hands on Percussion (TropiJazz/RMM)
- 1997 Island Eyes (TropiJazz/RMM)
- 1998 Rhythm in the House (TropiJazz/RMM)
- 2003 Hilton Ruiz Songbook (Hilton Ruiz Music)
- 2003 Enchantment (Arabesque)
- 2004 A New York Story Hilton Ruiz Music
- 2005 Steppin' with T.P.- dedicated to Tito Puente M27 Records

=== As sideman ===
With George Coleman

- Amsterdam After Dark (Timeless, 1979)
- Live (PYE Records, 1979)

With Rahsaan Roland Kirk

- The Case of the 3 Sided Dream in Audio Color (Atlantic, 1975)
- Other Folks' Music (Atlantic, 1976)
- Kirkatron (Warner Bros., 1976)
- The Return of the 5000 Lb. Man (Warner Bros., 1976)
- Boogie-Woogie String Along for Real (Warner Bros., 1977)

With others

- Marion Brown, Back to Paris (1980)
- Paquito D'Rivera, Paquito Blowin (1981)
- Greg Abate, Horace is Here: A Tribute to Horace Silver (2004)
- Afro Blue Band, Impressions (1995)
- Art Davis, Reemergence (1980)
- Chico Freeman, Beyond the Rain (Contemporary, 1977)
- Dizzy Gillespie, Rhythmstick (1990)
- Abbey Lincoln, Golden Lady (1980)
- Tisziji Munoz, Presence of Truth (1999)
