= The Jazz Theory Book =

1995 book by Mark Levine

- Cover
- Author: Mark Levine
- Cover artist: Joseph Holston
- Language: English
- Subject: Jazz
- Genre: Non-fiction; Encyclopedic; Reference
- Publisher: Sher Music
- English publication date: 1995
- Media type: Spiral-bound
- Pages: 522
- ISBN: 1883217040

The Jazz Theory Book is an influential work by Mark Levine, first published in 1995. The book is a staple in jazz theory, and contains a wide range of jazz concepts from melodic minor scales and whole tone scale to bebop scales, diminished scales and "Coltrane" reharmonization. Levine assumes that the reader can read music, and gives over 750 musical examples.

== See also ==
- The Jazz Piano Book
