= Ray Pizzi =

American jazz musician

- Also known as: Pizza Man
- Born: Raymond Michael Pizzi; January 19, 1943; Everett, Massachusetts, U.S.
- Died: September 2, 2021 (aged 78)
- Genres: Jazz
- Instruments: Flute, saxophone, bassoon

Raymond Michael Pizzi (January 19, 1943 – September 2, 2021), nicknamed Pizza Man, was an American jazz saxophonist, bassoonist, and flautist.

== Early life ==
Pizzi's first instrument was clarinet. He attended the Boston Conservatory and Berklee College of Music in the 1960s.

== Career ==
Pizzi taught in Randolph, Massachusetts public schools from 1964 to 1969. He relocated to California in 1969, and in the 1970s worked with Thad Jones and Mel Lewis, Frank Zappa, Shelly Manne, Willie Bobo, Moacir Santos, Mark Levine, and Dizzy Gillespie. In the 1980s, he accompanied Nancy Wilson and was a sideman for Milcho Leviev and Bob Florence, and worked with the American Jazz Orchestra into the early-1990s. He has recorded as a leader, including in a quartet called Windrider. He joined the faculty at the Henry Mancini Institute at the University of Miami in 1997.
