= Excition =

Studio album by Hilton Ruiz Quintet
- Released: 1977
- Recorded: February 7, 1977
- Studios: C.I. Recording Inc., NYC
- Genre: Jazz
- Length: 48:50
- Labels: SteepleChase; SCS 1078
- Producer: Nils Winther

Hilton Ruiz chronology
Piano Man (1975)	Excition (1977)	New York Hilton (1977)

Excition is an album by pianist Hilton Ruiz recorded in 1977 and released on the Danish label SteepleChase.

== Reception ==
Professional ratings
Review scores
Source	Rating
AllMusic	4/5 stars
The Penguin Guide to Jazz Recordings	3/4 stars

The AllMusic review by Ken Dryden states "Excition is a strong example of Ruiz's ability as both a performer and arranger".

== Track listing ==
1. "Dedicated to the Cooker" (Hilton Ruiz) – 10:15
2. "Excition" (Frank Foster) – 10:35
3. "The House That Love Built" (Foster) – 7:25
4. "Blues for Becky" (Richard Williams) – 10:48
5. "Origin" (Pharoah Sanders) – 9:43 Additional track on CD

== Personnel ==
- Hilton Ruiz – piano
- Richard Williams – trumpet
- Frank Foster – tenor saxophone
- Buster Williams – bass
- Roy Brooks – drums
