= Mark Levine (musician) =

American jazz musician (1938–2022)

- Born: Mark Jay Levine; October 4, 1938; Concord, New Hampshire, U.S.
- Died: January 27, 2022 (aged 83)
- Genres: Jazz
- Occupations: Musician, composer and author
- Instruments: Piano, trombone

Mark Jay Levine (October 4, 1938 – January 27, 2022) was an American jazz pianist, trombonist, composer, author and educator.

== Early life ==
Mark Jay Levine was born in Concord, New Hampshire, on October 4, 1938. He began playing the piano at the age of five and started trombone in his early teens. He attended Boston University, and graduated with a degree in music in 1960. He also studied privately with Jaki Byard, Hall Overton, and Herb Pomeroy.

== Career ==
After graduating, Levine moved to New York, where he freelanced and then played with musicians including Houston Person (1966), Mongo Santamaría (1969–70), and Willie Bobo (1971–74). Levine then moved to San Francisco, and played there with Woody Shaw in 1975–76. Levine made his first recording as a leader for Catalyst Records in 1976. He also played with the Blue Mitchell/Harold Land Quintet (1975–79), Joe Henderson, Stan Getz, Bobby Hutcherson, Luis Gasca, and Cal Tjader (1979–83). From 1980 to 1983, he concentrated on valve trombone, but then returned to playing mainly the piano. He then led his own bands, and recorded for Concord as a leader in 1983 and 1985. From 1992 Levine was part of Henderson's big band. Levine created a new trio in 1996 and recorded it for his own, eponymous label. His Latin jazz group, Que Calor, was formed in 1997.

Levine began teaching in 1970: in addition to private lessons, he worked at Diablo Valley College (1979–95), Mills College (1985–95), Antioch University in San Francisco (1986–87), the San Francisco Conservatory of Music (1992–97), Sonoma State University (1989-1990), and the JazzSchool in Berkeley (from 1997). Levine also wrote two method books: The Jazz Piano Book (1990), and The Jazz Theory Book (around 1995). He was nominated for a Grammy Award for Best Latin Jazz Album in 2003 for his recording Isla.

== Personal life and death ==
Levine died of pneumonia on January 27, 2022, at the age of 83.

== Discography ==
=== As leader ===
Year recorded	Title	Label	Notes
1975	Live at the Reunion San Francisco	Jazz School	Nonet, including Woody Shaw
1977?	Up Till Now	Catalyst	
1983?	Concepts	Concord	
1985	Smiley and Me	Concord	Duo, with Smiley Winters (drums)
1995?	Impressions		with Afro Blue Band
1997	One Notch Up		Trio, with Eddie Marshall, John Wiitala
1997?	Exact Change		with Eddie Marshall, John Wiitala
2000	Hey, It's Me		Quartet
2001	Serengeti		Quartet, with Peter Barshay (bass), Paul van Wageningen (drums), Michael Spiro (percussion)
2002	Isla	Left Coast Clave	Most tracks quartet, with Peter Barshay (bass), Paul van Wageningen (drums), Michael Spiro (percussion); two tracks quintet with Harvey Wainapel (soprano sax, clarinet) added; one track quintet with Sheila Smith (vocals) added
2009	Off & On: The Music of Moacir Santos		With Mary Fettig (flute, soprano sax, bass clarinet), John Wiitala (bass), Paul Van Wageningen (drums), Michael Spiro (percussion)
2010?	New Music from New York		

=== As sideman ===
With Pete & Sheila Escovedo

- Solo Two (Milestone Records, 1977)

With Cal Tjader

- La Onda Va Bien (Concord, 1979)
- Gozame! Pero Ya... (Concord, 1980)
- A Fuego Vivo (Concord, 1981)
- Heat Wave (Concord, 1982) - with Carmen McRae
- Good Vibes (Concord, 1984)

With Mark Murphy

- Stolen Moments (Muse, 1978)

With Houston Person

- Underground Soul! (Prestige, 1966)

With Joe McPhee

- Rotation (HatHUT, 1977)

With Moacir Santos

- Saudade (Blue Note, 1974)

== Bibliography ==
- The Jazz Piano Book, Sher Music Co. (1989), ISBN 0961470151
- The Jazz Theory Book, Sher Music Co. (1995), ISBN 1883217040
- Jazz Piano Masterclass with Mark Levine. The Drop 2 Book, Sher Music Co. (2006), ISBN 1-883217-47-4
- How to Voice Standards at the Piano: The Menu, Sher Music Co. (2014), ISBN 1883217806
