= The Jazz Piano Book =

1989 book by Mark Levine

- Author: Mark Levine
- Language: English
- Genre: Music
- Publication date: January 1, 1989

The Jazz Piano Book is a method book written by Mark Levine. It was first published on January 1, 1989. It aims to summarise the musical theory, including jazz harmony, required by an aspiring jazz pianist.

Its target readership appears to be reading musicians who are new to jazz, implicitly classical musicians—there is very little discussion of physical pianistic technique, and only a very brief summary of musical intervals intended as a refresher. Another significant omission is any discussion of post-stride solo piano techniques—it is generally assumed that a bass player will be present to provide a root for the voicings that are discussed.

The book covers a range of topics including left-hand voicings, scales and modes, improvisation, chords and comping. Much of the book involves musical theory, as Mark Levine states in the introduction. Jazz standards are cited frequently, often with notated examples, to help to explain a particular topic or idea.
