= Moacir Santos =

Brazilian musician and composer (1926–2006)

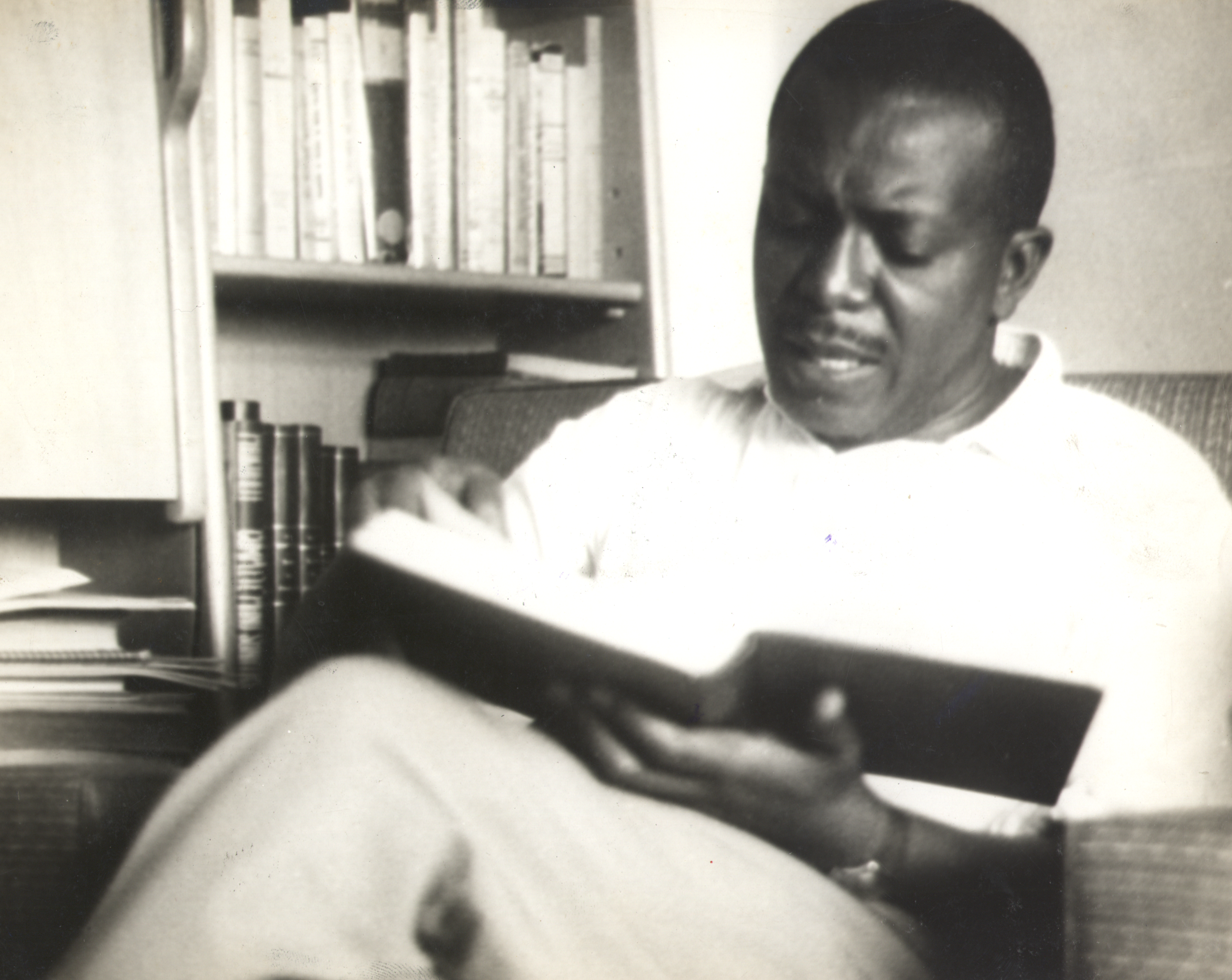

Background information
- Born: July 26, 1926; Flores do Pajeú, Pernambuco, Brazil
- Died: August 6, 2006 (aged 80) Pasadena, California, United States
- Genres: Latin Jazz, Bossa Nova, MPB
- Instruments: saxophone, banjo, guitar, mandolin, piano
- Labels: Forma, Blue Note, Universal, Adventure Music

Moacir Santos (26 July 1926 – 6 August 2006) was a Brazilian composer, multi-instrumentalist and music educator. Musicians such as Baden Powell, Bola Sete and Wilson das Neves studied under him. As a composer, Santos worked with Nara Leão, Roberto Menescal, Sérgio Mendes and Lynda Laurence, among others. His music was highly respected by musicians in Brazil and the United States, despite never achieving wider recognition.

Mark Levine, Anat Cohen, and Muiza Adnet have all released albums consisting entirely of Santos' music.

== Life and career ==
Moacir Santos was born in Flores do Pajeú, Pernambuco in 1926. His mother died when he was two years old, and as his father had already left the family, he was taken in by another family. He grew up in poverty but his adoptive family assisted him with attending school and music lessons. By age 14, he could play the saxophone, banjo, guitar and mandolin. As a teenager, he played in the band of the Military Police of Paraíba and later became the band's conductor. He eventually ran away from home, becoming an itinerant musician moving around Pernambuco looking for employment and even, for a time, working in a travelling circus.

By the 1950s, Santos was living in Rio de Janeiro and worked for Rádio Nacional as a composer. Recognising the artistic value of popular music, Santos began to study big-band composers, taking lessons from Hans-Joachim Koelreutter. Ultimately, he would become the radio station's music director. During the 1950s and 1960s, Santos privately taught a number of young Bossa Nova musicians such as Nara Leão, Baden Powell, Carlos Lyra and Roberto Menescal.

In 1965, Santos released the album Coisas (translating to "things" in Portuguese) on the Forma record label. The album was a fusion of Afro-Brazilian rhythms and the sounds of big-band jazz. Although at the time the album did not garner much attention, it has gone on to receive praise with the New York Times describing it as "one of the great accomplishments of modern Brazilian music". Larry Blumenfeld, in The Village Voice, wrote that the album represented "the best of Brazilian jazz".

After composing a number of scores for Brazilian films throughout the 1960s, Santos had the opportunity to move to the United States. In 1967, Santos and his wife, Cleonice, moved to Pasadena, California, with the intent of breaking into the film industry. He continued to give music lessons from his home, through which he met Horace Silver. Most of his work in Hollywood was uncredited, with Final Justice being his only film credit.

Santos recorded three albums for Blue Note in the 1970s. His 1972 release, Maestro, was nominated for a Grammy award. Santos, however, did not receive the wider acclaim he sought and continued to write and teach music in Southern California.

In 2001, fellow Brazilians Zé Nogueira and Mario Adnet arranged sessions to re-record some of Santos' compositions. These recordings would form the 2004 album Ouro Negro which featured performances from Milton Nascimento, Joao Donato and Gilberto Gil. The album revived Santos' reputation in Brazil and around the world. His final album, Choros & Alegria, was released in 2005. It was made up entirely of new material and featured a performance from Wynton Marsalis.

In 2006, Santos died due to complications from an earlier stroke at an assisted living facility in Pasadena, California. Shortly before dying, Santos was awarded the Shell Music and Premio Tim awards.

== Discography ==
=== As leader ===
- Coisas (Forma, 1965)
- Maestro (Blue Note, 1972)
- Saudade (Blue Note, 1974)
- Carnival of the Spirits (Blue Note, 1975)
- Opus 3 No. 1 (Discovery, 1979)
- Ouro Negro (Universal, 2001)
- Choros & Alegria (Adventure Music, 2005)

=== As sideman ===
- Kenny Burrell, Both Feet on the Ground (Fantasy, 1973)
- Kenny Burrell, Heritage (AudioSource, 1980)
- Raul de Souza, Til Tomorrow Comes (Capitol, 1979)
- Cass Elliot, Cass Elliot (RCA Victor, 1972)
- Shelly Manne, Hot Coles (RCA Victor/Flying Dutchman, 1975)
- Sergio Mendes, Sergio Mendes' Favorite Things (Atlantic, 1968)
- Joao Nogueira, Boca Do Povo (Polydor, 1981)
- Baden Powell, Baden Powell Swings with Jimmy Pratt (Elenco, 1963)
- Benny Powell, Ya Betcha B.P.!! (Los Angeles Phonograph, 1979)

=== As musical arranger ===
- Luiza,Luiza, (RCA Victor Brasil, 1964)
- Vinicius de Moraes, Vinicius & Odette Lara, (Discos Elenco LTDA, 1963)
