= The Melody Lingers On =

The Melody Lingers On may refer to:

- The Melody Lingers On (Dizzy Gillespie album)
- The Melody Lingers On (Houston Person album)
- The Melody Lingers On (Etta Jones album)
- The Melody Lingers On (film), a 1935 American film
