= Randy Johnston (musician) =

American jazz guitarist (born 1956)

- Birth name: Randy Barksdale Johnston
- Born: December 5, 1956 (age 68); Detroit, Michigan
- Genres: Jazz
- Occupation: Musician
- Instrument: Guitar
- Years active: 1981–present
- Labels: Muse, J Curve, HighNote
- Website: randyjohnston.net

Randy Barksdale Johnston (born December 5, 1956) is an American jazz guitarist.

== Career ==
The Beatles's performance on The Ed Sullivan Show inspired Johnston to start playing guitar in childhood. He heard jazz for the first time on the album The Smithsonian Collection of Jazz and was influenced by guitarists Kenny Burrell and Grant Green.

Johnston's family moved to Richmond, Virginia, when he was thirteen. He was a member of rock bands that performed at parties and school dances. In the late 1970s he attended the University of Miami, occasionally involved in jam sessions at a Unitarian Church with Ira Sullivan. In the early 1980s he moved to New York City and worked with Warne Marsh, then as a sideman with Houston Person and Etta Jones. Person produced his first album, Walk On, which was engineered by Rudy Van Gelder. He has worked with Joey DeFrancesco, Lou Donaldson, Lee Konitz, and Lonnie Smith.

== Discography ==
- Walk On (Muse, 1992)
- Jubilation (Muse, 1994)
- In A-Chord (Muse, 1995)
- Somewhere in the Night (HighNote, 1997)
- Riding the Curve (J-Curve, 1998)
- Homage (J-Curve, 2000)
- Detour Ahead (HighNote, 2001)
- Hit & Run (HighNote, 2002)
- Is It You (HighNote, 2005)
- People Music (Random Act, 2011)

=== As sideman ===
With Houston Person

- The Party (Muse, 1991)
- Why Not! (Muse, 1991)
- Christmas with Houston Person and Friends (Muse, 1994)
- All Soul (HighNote, 2005)
- Moment to Moment (HighNote, 2010)

With others

- Joey DeFrancesco, The Champ (HighNote, 1999)
- Lou Donaldson, Relaxing at Sea (Chiaroscuro, 2000)
- Della Griffin, Travelin' Light (Muse, 1994)
- Della Griffin, I'll Get by (Muse, 1996)
- Etta Jones, Sugar (Muse, 1990)
- Etta Jones, Christmas with Etta Jones (Muse, 1990)
- Eddie Landsberg, Remembering Eddie Jefferson (Berghem, 2002)
- Johnny Lytle, Possum Grease (Muse, 1995)
- Jack McDuff, Another Real Good'un (Muse, 1990)
- Irene Reid, One Monkey Don't Stop No Show (Savant, 2002)
- Bria Skonberg, So Is the Day (Random Act, 2012)
