= Easy Living (Etta Jones album) =

Studio album by Etta Jones
- Released: August 29, 2000
- Recorded: February 11, 2000
- Studio: M & I Recording Studios, NYC
- Genre: Jazz
- Length: 57:16
- Label: HighNote; HCD 7059
- Producer: Houston Person

Etta Jones chronology
All the Way (1999)	Easy Living (2000)	Together at Christmas (2000)

Easy Living is an album by vocalist Etta Jones that was recorded in 2000 and released on the HighNote label.

== Reception ==
Professional ratings
Review scores
Source	Rating
Allmusic	4/5 stars
The Penguin Guide to Jazz Recordings	3.5/4 stars

In his review on Allmusic, Scott Yanow states: "For one of her last recordings, Etta Jones sings a wide variety of standards, many of which she had not recorded previously. ... Jones gives each tune such a bluesy approach that she transforms them into new soulful pieces ... Recommended." On All About Jazz Mathew Bahl noted: "Easy Living, Etta Jones’ wonderful new CD, is a celebration of a reunion and a partnership. The partnership is, of course, Ms. Jones’ longstanding collaboration with Houston Person. Mr. Person has played on and/or produced nearly all of Ms. Jones’ recordings since 1976. The reunion is with pianist Richard Wyands who in 1960 played for Ms. Jones on her breakthrough album, Don't Go to Strangers. Ms. Jones’ nasal, instantly identifiable tone has only grown richer and more textured with age ... she makes the meaning of every song utterly explicit and delivers lyrics with an honesty that defies traditional notions of interpretation. In fact, of today's jazz singers, only Abbey Lincoln can match the sheer authority of Ms. Jones’ singing ... Easy Living proves the truth behind the old adage that there really are some things that do get better with age."

== Track listing ==
1. "Did I Remember" (Walter Donaldson, Harold Adamson) – 4:52
2. "Easy Living" (Ralph Rainger, Leo Robin) – 5:03
3. "After You've Gone" (Turner Layton, Henry Creamer) – 4:53
4. "Something to Remember You By" (Arthur Schwartz, Howard Dietz) – 5:23
5. "They Say It's Wonderful" (Irving Berlin) – 4:01
6. "Time After Time" (Jule Styne, Sammy Cahn) – 5:17
7. "Who Can I Turn To?" (Leslie Bricusse, Anthony Newley) – 4:06
8. "Our Very Own" (Victor Young, Jack Elliott) – 4:59
9. "I Thought You Ought to Know" (Cecil Carter, Tommy Dilbeck) – 5:03
10. "On a Slow Boat to China" (Frank Loesser) – 4:44
11. "I'm Afraid the Masquerade Is Over" (Herbert Magidson, Allie Wrubel) – 8:55

== Personnel ==
- Etta Jones – vocals
- Houston Person – tenor saxophone (tracks 1, 2, 4–6, 8 & 11)
- Richard Wyands – piano
- Ray Drummond – bass
- Chip White – drums
