= If You Could See Me Now (Etta Jones album) =

Studio album by Etta Jones
- Released: 1979
- Recorded: June 21, 1978
- Studios: Van Gelder Studio, Englewood Cliffs, NJ
- Genre: Jazz
- Labels: Muse; MR 5175
- Producer: Houston Person

Etta Jones chronology
My Mother's Eyes (1977)	If You Could See Me Now (1979)	Save Your Love for Me (1981)

If You Could See Me Now is an album by vocalist Etta Jones that was recorded in 1978 and released on the Muse label.

== Reception ==
DownBeat assigned the album 5 stars. Reviewer Sam Freedman wrote, "Jones doesn't flaunt her range, but devotes her energies to the power of decades-old lyrics. If a good singer tells a story. Jones orates. Except for an occasional slurred run of four or five words, she drenches each word with meaning . . . Throughout, the band is excellent. Person leaves his normal lusty grits-and-greens tenor for subtle, mid-register solos and answering twos and fours. Phillips is the smooth essence of what he calls “featherbedding.” The brief solos by drummer Idris Muhammad and vibist George Devens always matter. This may not be a ground-breaking album; Jones has been good lfor years. But If You Could See Me Now chronicles a woman at the height of her powers".

Professional ratings
Review scores
Source	Rating
AllMusic	3/5 stars
DownBeat	5/5 stars

== Track listing ==
1. "What a Little Moonlight Can Do" (Harry M. Woods) – 3:59
2. "Ghost of a Chance" (Victor Young, Ned Washington) – 5:00
3. "I Saw Stars" (Maurice Sigler, Al Goodhart, Al Hoffman) – 4:24
4. "If You Could See Me Now" (Tadd Dameron) – 6:35
5. "I'm in the Mood for Love" (Jimmy McHugh, Dorothy Fields) – 5:43
6. "It Could Happen to You" (Jimmy Van Heusen, Johnny Burke) – 3:30
7. "The Way We Were" (Alan Bergman, Marilyn Bergman, Marvin Hamlisch) – 4:17
8. "Ain't Misbehavin'" (Andy Razaf, Fats Waller, Harry Brooks) – 4:09

== Personnel ==
- Etta Jones – vocals
- Houston Person – tenor saxophone
- Sonny Phillips – keyboards
- Sam Jones – bass
- Larry Killian – percussion
- Idris Muhammad – drums
- George Devens – vibraphone
- Melvin Sparks – guitar
