= My Gentleman Friend (Etta Jones album) =

Studio album by Etta Jones
- Released: 1996
- Recorded: 1994
- Studio: Sear Sound, New York City
- Genre: Jazz
- Length: 43:34
- Label: Muse; MR 5534
- Producer: Houston Person

Etta Jones chronology
Reverse the Charges (1992)	My Gentleman Friend (1996)	At Last (1995)

My Gentleman Friend is an album by vocalist Etta Jones and pianist Benny Green which was recorded in 1994 and released on the Muse label in 1996.

== Reception ==
Professional ratings
Review scores
Source	Rating
AllMusic	4/5 stars

The AllMusic review by Scott Yanow stated "For this slightly unusual set, veteran singer Etta Jones performs a set of duets with the very supportive yet consistently swinging pianist Benny Green. The tempoes vary a bit while Jones generally sticks to the lyrics, adding a soulful touch to each of the standards. The singer displays both maturity and restraint on the somewhat predictable but enjoyable outing which has a late-night feel".

== Track listing ==
1. "But Beautiful" (Jimmy Van Heusen, Johnny Burke) – 4:37
2. "I Don't Want to Walk Without You" (Frank Loesser, Jule Styne) – 3:47
3. "For Once in My Life" (Ron Miller, Orlando Murden) – 4:38
4. "Happiness Is a Thing Called Joe" (Harold Arlen, Yip Harburg) – 4:43
5. "Because of You" (Arthur Hammerstein, Dudley Wilkinson) – 4:27
6. "Gee, Baby, Ain't I Good to You" (Andy Razaf, Don Redman) – 3:01
7. "If You Could See Me Now" (Tadd Dameron, Carl Sigman) – 4:42
8. "Teach Me Tonight" (Gene DePaul, Sammy Cahn) – 4:11
9. "You Better Go Now" (Robert Graham, Bickley S. Reichmer) – 4:50
10. "When I Grow Too Old to Dream" (Sigmund Romberg, Oscar Hammerstein II) – 4:38

== Personnel ==
- Etta Jones – vocals
- Benny Green – piano
