= Della Griffin =

American jazz musician (1922–2022)

Della Griffin (June 12, 1922 – August 9, 2022), also known as Della Simpson, was an American jazz vocalist and drummer. She was a member of two of the first all female R&B groups in the 1950s, The Enchanters and The Dell-Tones.

== Biography ==
=== Early life and career ===
Griffin was born in Newberry, South Carolina, on June 12, 1922, to William and Mary Gilliam. The nineteenth out of twenty children, she later moved to New York City, where she grew up.

Griffin greatly admired and was influenced by Count Basie, Charlie Barnet, and most specifically Billie Holiday. She began singing when she was 12, and while singing remained her passion she was also proficient on the drums, alto saxophone, and piano. She graduated in 1943 from Jamaica High School in Queens, NY, and began singing professionally a few years after.

In 1950, Griffin and Frances Kelley decided to form a singing group. The two women knew each other from working together in a factory that manufactured shoulder pads. They then added to the group Pearl Brice, Della's childhood friend, and Rachel Gist, a Harlem club soloist. Their friend Chris Townes became their instructor, arranger, pianist, and songwriter. The group played in small clubs whenever they could for about a year. In 1951, Della invited Jerry Blaine, the owner of Jubilee Records, to hear the group perform. Blaine was so impressed by the group that he signed them the next day. The first songs they recorded include, "Today is Your Birthday," "How Could You Break My Heart," "I've Lost," "Housewife Blues," and "You Know I'm Not in Love With You." In January 1952 Jubilee released The Enchanters first record. The Enchanters began touring the country and received such a positive response that in 1952 Shaws Artist Corporation signed on to represent them. Also in 1952, Jubilee released the Enchanters second record. Not long after this Rachel Gist and Pearl Brice decided to leave the group.

Griffin and Frances Kelley were determined to continue their careers and replaced Rachel Gist and Pearl Brice with Gloria Alleyne and Sherry Gary from the group the Dorsey Sisters. With the new members the group took on a new name, the Dell-Tones, named after Della Griffin because she was the group's lead singer and drummer. Della Griffin was the first female drummer in a well-known group. Della's first of three husbands, Jimmy Simpson, managed the group and got them a recording deal with Coral's Brunswick subsidiary. There, in 1953, they recorded "Yours Alone" and "My Hearts on Fire". Without much of a response, the Dell-Tones decided to leave Brunswick and signed on with Eddie Heller's Rainbow records. There they recorded "I'm Not in Love With You" and "Little Short Daddy." The group then went on the "Night Train Tour" with Jimmy Forrest. Frances Kelley, Gloria Alleyne, and Sherry Gary all decided to leave the Dell-Tones and they were replaced by Algie Willie, Shirley Bunnie Foy and Renee Stewart. With the new members, the Dell-Tones signed with Sol Rabinowitz's Baton records and recorded "Don't Be Long," "Baby Say You Love Me," "My Special Love," and "Believe It." In 1955 Stan Pat, previous member Gloria Alleyne's new manager, signed the Dell-Tones. They then did a tour of Canada. Afterwards Gloria Bell and original member Chris Townes left the group. The Dell-Tones merged with Sonny Til and his group The Orioles and the new group contained Della Griffin, Sonny Til, Della's second husband Paul Griffin, Diz Russell, Jerry Holeman, Aaron "Tex" Cornelius, Billy Adams, Shirley "Bunnie" Foy, Renee Stewart, and Algie Willie. The new group performed in several New York City clubs and recorded, "Voices of Love" and "I'm so Lonely" in 1957. After this time, The Dell-Tones slowly began to drift apart and Della left to perform on her own.

=== Personal life ===
Griffin was married three times, first to the manager of The Enchanters, Jimmy Simpson, then to The Dell-Tones pianist Paul Griffin, and finally to saxophone player Gene Walker. Over the years she toured with and supported many artists including Jimmy Forrest, Sonny Stitt, Benny Green, Illinois Jacquet and her sister-in-law, Etta Jones. After leaving the Dell-Tones, Della's husband at the time, Paul Griffin, encouraged her to take some time off to focus on their family. After Della and Paul ended their marriage, Della began performing again in New York City clubs including The Blue Note and The Blue Book, where she stayed for years.

In 1984, Griffin had to take another break from her career after she suffered serious injuries from being hit by a car. After her recovery, she was able to return to her passion, performing, and was most often featured as a singer rather than a drummer which helped her gain more attention. At the age of 65, she made her first album with tenor saxophonist Houston Person. She performed overseas, including a performance at the Alandia Jazz Festival in Finland in 1998. Griffin never had children, but she was a foster parent to more than a dozen foster children. She became a close friend to Billie Holiday, whose husband would stop by every week after Billie's death to hear Griffin sing because her voice reminded him of Billie.

In 2005, Ronnie I of the UGHA (United Group Harmony Association) brought Griffin back to the stage once again. Della Griffin and The Enchanters performed as the headline act at one of the UGHA's monthly shows. Also appearing at that show were The Dubs and The GoldTones. Della seemed to be struggling through her performance, having a difficult time remembering the songs and the lyrics, and often appearing disoriented and confused. Nevertheless, she did make it through the show and received a strong response from the audience.

Griffin lived in New Rochelle, New York, where her foster children would visit her daily. She died in New York City on August 9, 2022, at the age of 100.

== Discography ==
- Sings (Dobre, 1978)
- I'll Get By (Muse, 1990)
- Travelin' Light (Muse, 1992)
- The Very Thought of You (Savant, 1998)

With Etta Jones

- Sugar (Muse, 1989)

With Houston Person

- Christmas with Houston Person and Friends (Muse, 1994)
