= This Is Always (song) =

1946 song

Song
- Released: 1946
- Genre: popular, jazz
- Composer: Harry Warren
- Lyricist: Mack Gordon

"This Is Always" is a popular song composed by Harry Warren with lyrics by Mack Gordon for the musical Three Little Girls in Blue.

== Release ==
The song was first recorded in May of 1946 by Bobby Byrne and His Orchestra and first released in June by George Paxton but the first theatrical release was in September of that same year.

== Background ==
The song was nominated for the Academy Award for Best Original Song, but its nomination was revoked shortly after nominations were announced. It had been cut from the final film, rendering it ineligible. Despite this, it became quite popular due to its numerous re-recordings and was placed at 14 for greatest radio audiences for a song in November 1946.

== Notable recordings ==
- Dick Haymes - This Is Always / Willow Road (1946)
- Harry James & His Orchestra - This Is Always / I've Never Forgotten (1946)
- Jo Stafford - This Is Always / I'll Be With You In Apple Blossom Time (1946)
- Charlie Parker Quartet (feat. Earl Coleman) - Dewey Square / This Is Always (1947)
- Cab Calloway - Let's Swing! (1965)
- Etta Jones - Sugar (1990)
