= Trust in Me =

"Trust in Me" may refer to:

- "Trust in Me" (1937 song), a song popularized by Mildred Bailey, revived in 1951 by Eddie Fisher and 1961 by Etta James
- "Trust in Me" (The Python's Song), a 1967 song by Robert and Richard Sherman from the film The Jungle Book
- "Trust in Me", a 1992 song by Joe Cocker, Sass Jordan, and Francesca Beghe from the film The Bodyguard
- "Trust in Me", a 2001 song by Katy Hudson (later known as Katy Perry) from the album Katy Hudson
- "Trust in Me" (Lim Young-woong song), a 2020 song by Lim Young-woong
- Trust in Me, a 1994 film starring Ian Tracey
- Trust in Me (album), a 1967 album by Houston Person featuring the 1937 song
