= Walk On (Randy Johnston album) =

Studio album by Randy Johnston
- Released: January 1992
- Recorded: January 28, 1991
- Studio: Van Gelder Studio, Englewood Cliffs, NJ
- Genre: Jazz
- Length: 52:17
- Label: Muse; MCD 5432
- Producer: Houston Person

Randy Johnston chronology
Walk On (1992)	Jubilation (1992)

Walk On is the debut album by guitarist Randy Johnston which was recorded in 1991 and released on the Muse label the following year.

== Reception ==
Professional ratings
Review scores
Source	Rating
AllMusic	3/5 stars

The AllMusic review by Alex Henderson stated "Randy Johnston is a perfect example of a jazzman who has never been innovative or groundbreaking but is darn good at what he does ... Walk On never pretended to reinvent the jazz wheel, but it was a decent way for him to start his recording career as a leader".

== Track listing ==
All compositions by Randy Johnson except where noted

1. "Jumping the Blues (Jumpin' Blues)" (Jay McShann) – 4:14
2. "I Almost Lost My Mind" (Ivory Joe Hunter) – 9:09
3. "Walk On" – 7:07
4. "Crazy He Calls Me" (Carl Sigman, Bob Russell) – 6:32
5. "The Queen´s Samba" – 4:30
6. "My Shining Hour" (Harold Arlen, Johnny Mercer) – 6:03
7. "Please Send Me Someone to Love" (Percy Mayfield) – 7:40
8. "Moanin' (Bobby Timmons) – 7:02

== Personnel ==
- Randy Johnston – guitar
- Bill Easley – saxophone
- Benny Green – piano
- Ray Drummond – bass
- Kenny Washington – drums
