= Jubilation (Randy Johnston album) =

Studio album by Randy Johnston
- Released: 1994
- Recorded: November 18, 1992
- Studio: Van Gelder Studio, Englewood Cliffs, NJ
- Genre: Jazz
- Length: 57:26
- Label: Muse; MR/MCD/MC 5495
- Producer: Houston Person

Randy Johnston chronology
Walk On (1992)	Jubilation (1994)	In-a-Chord (1994)

Jubilation is an album by guitarist Randy Johnston which was recorded in 1992 and released on the Muse label in 1994.

== Reception ==
Professional ratings
Review scores
Source	Rating
AllMusic	3/5 stars

The AllMusic review by Ron Wynn stated "He has a fluid style, plays in the full-toned, relaxed, taut fashion of Wes Montgomery and Kenny Burrell, and has the versatility to handle blues, soul-jazz and interpretations of show tunes. ... Finely tuned, expertly performed light jazz with a touch of funk, soul and blues".

== Track listing ==
All compositions by Randy Johnson except where noted

1. "Jubilation" (Junior Mance) – 4:08
2. "One for Detroit" – 5:48
3. "You Are Too Beautiful" (Richard Rodgers, Lorenz Hart) – 7:33
4. "Willow Weep for Me" (Ann Ronell) – 9:09
5. "Rolling at the Summit" – 4:38
6. "Angela" (Dom Minasi) – 7:14
7. "Come Rain or Come Shine" (Harold Arlen, Johnny Mercer) – 5:30
8. "9 W Blues" – 6:55
9. "Baby, You Should Know It" (Ben Tucker, Bob Dorough) – 6:31

== Personnel ==
- Randy Johnston – guitar
- Eric Alexander – tenor saxophone (tracks 1, 2 & 6)
- Bruce Barth – piano
- Nat Reeves – bass
- Michael Carvin – drums
