= Hollar! =

Studio album by Etta Jones
- Released: November 1963
- Recorded: September 16, 1960, March 30, 1961 and November 28, 1962
- Studio: Van Gelder Studio, Englewood Cliffs, New Jersey
- Genre: Vocal jazz
- Length: 33:34
- Label: Prestige; PRLP 7284
- Producer: Esmond Edwards

Etta Jones chronology
Lonely and Blue (1962)	Hollar! (1963)	Love Shout (1963)

Hollar! is an album by the jazz vocalist Etta Jones which was released through Prestige Records in November 1963. It was recorded at three separate sessions between 1960 and 1962.

== Reception ==
Professional ratings
Review scores
Source	Rating
Allmusic	4/5 stars
The Penguin Guide to Jazz Recordings	3/4 stars

The Allmusic site awarded the album 4 stars but stated: "Etta Jones had the spark that made each of her vocals special, though she was never acknowledged properly during a long career.... This is easily one of Etta Jones' best recordings."

== Track listing ==
1. "And the Angels Sing" (Ziggy Elman, Johnny Mercer) – 2:37
2. "I Got It Bad (and That Ain't Good)" (Duke Ellington, Paul Francis Webster) – 4:11
3. "Give Me the Simple Life" (Rube Bloom, Harry Ruby) – 2:54
4. "The More I See You" (Mack Gordon, Harry Warren) – 4:13
5. "Love Is Here to Stay" (George Gershwin, Ira Gershwin) – 3:49
6. "Reverse the Charges" (Webster, Clarence Williams) – 2:59
7. "They Can't Take That Away from Me" (Gershwin, Gershwin) – 2:52
8. "Answer Me, My Love" (Fred Rauch, Carl Sigman, Gerhard Winkler) – 3:20
9. "Looking Back" (Brook Benton, Clyde Otis) – 3:44
10. "Nature Boy" (eden ahbez) – 2:55
- Recorded at Van Gelder Studio in Englewood Cliffs, New Jersey, on September 16, 1960 (tracks 2, 4, 5 & 7), March 30, 1961 (tracks 1, 3, 6, 8 & 9) and November 28, 1962 (track 10).

== Personnel ==
- Etta Jones – vocals
- Oliver Nelson (tracks 4 & 5), Jerome Richardson (track 10) – tenor saxophone
- Lem Winchester – vibraphone (tracks 2, 4, 5 & 7)
- Kenny Burrell (track 10), Bucky Pizzarelli (track 10), Wally Richardson (tracks 1, 3, 6, 8 & 9) – guitar
- Sam Bruno (track 10), Jimmy Neeley (tracks 1, 3, 6, 8 & 9), Richard Wyands (tracks 2, 4, 5 & 7) – piano
- George Duvivier (tracks 2, 4, 5 & 7), Michael Mulia (tracks 1, 3, 6, 8 & 9) – bass
- Bobby Donaldson (track 10), Roy Haynes (tracks 2, 4, 5 & 7), Rudy Lawless (tracks 1, 3, 6, 8 & 9) – drums
