= Ms. Jones to You =

Studio album by Etta Jones
- Released: 1977
- Recorded: July 1, 1976
- Studio: Blue Rock Studio, New York City
- Genre: Jazz
- Length: 32:31
- Label: Muse; MR 5099
- Producer: Houston Person

Etta Jones chronology
Etta Jones '75 (1975)	Ms. Jones to You (1977)	My Mother's Eyes (1979)

Ms. Jones to You is an album by vocalist Etta Jones which was recorded in 1976 and released on the Muse label.

Professional ratings
Review scores
Source	Rating
AllMusic	4/5 stars

== Track listing ==
1. "I'm Gonna Lock My Heart and Throw Away the Key" (Jimmy Eaton, Terry Shand) – 3:12
2. "Gone Away" (Curtis Lewis, Gladys Hampton, Curley Hamner) – 5:40
3. "The Second Time Around" (Jimmy Van Heusen, Sammy Cahn) – 4:00
4. "If That's the Way You Feel" (Billy Eckstine, Gerald Valentine) – 3:50
5. "Exactly Like You" (Jimmy McHugh, Dorothy Fields) – 4:50
6. "I'm All for You" (Larry Wynn, Jerry Bresler) – 5:59
7. "You'd Better Love Me" – 5:00

== Personnel ==
- Etta Jones – vocals
- Houston Person – tenor saxophone
- Walter Davis Jr. – piano
- Buster Williams – bass
- Larry Killian – congas, percussion
- Grady Tate – drums
- Jimmy Ponder – guitar
