= All the Way (Etta Jones album) =

Studio album by Etta Jones
- Released: September 28, 1999
- Recorded: May 25, 1999
- Studio: M & I Recording Studios, NYC
- Genre: Jazz
- Length: 55:16
- Label: HighNote; HCD 7047
- Producer: Houston Person

Etta Jones chronology
My Buddy: Etta Jones Sings the Songs of Buddy Johnson (1998)	All the Way (1999)	Easy Living (2000)

All the Way is an album by vocalist Etta Jones featuring songs by lyricist Sammy Cahn which was recorded in 1999 and released on the HighNote label.

== Reception ==
In JazzTimes Nancy Ann Lee noted "An instantly recognizable stylist, Etta Jones sings a heartfelt 10-tune Sammy Cahn tribute, lending drawling, note-bending phrasing to chestnuts such as "It's Magic," “I Should Care," “I'll Walk Alone", "All the Way" and more" and called it "Jones’ classiest, recent-best album".

== Track listing ==
1. "It's Magic" (Jule Styne, Sammy Cahn) – 5:41
2. "Second Time Around" (Jimmy Van Heusen, Cahn) – 6:10
3. "Until the Real Thing Comes Along" (Saul Chaplin, L.E. Freeman, Alberta Nichols, Mann Holiner, Cahn) – 6:09
4. "I Should Care" (Axel Stordahl, Paul Weston, Cahn) – 5:23
5. "I'll Walk Alone" (Styne, Cahn) – 6:18
6. "Saturday Night (Is the Loneliest Night of the Week)" (Styne, Cahn) – 3:49
7. "All the Way" (Van Heusen, Cahn) – 5:44
8. "It's You or No One" (Styne, Cahn) – 5:43
9. "It's Been a Long, Long Time" (Styne, Cahn) – 5:27
10. "Put 'em in a Box, Tie 'em with a Ribbon, and Throw 'em in the Deep Blue Sea" (Styne, Cahn) – 4:52

== Personnel ==
- Etta Jones – vocals
- Norman Simmons – piano
- John Webber – bass
- Kenny Washington – drums
- Houston Person – tenor saxophone (tracks 2, 4 & 5–8)
- Steve Turre – trombone (tracks 4, 6 & 10)
- Tom Aalfs – violin (tracks 1, 8 & 10)
- Russell Malone – guitar (tracks 1–5, 8 & 9)
