= Thinking of You (Houston Person album) =

Studio album by Houston Person
- Released: September 25, 2007
- Recorded: May 22, 2007
- Studio: Van Gelder Studio, Englewood Cliffs, NJ
- Genre: Jazz
- Length: 55:33
- Label: HighNote; HCD 7177
- Producer: Houston Person

Houston Person chronology
Just Between Friends (2005)	Thinking of You (2007)	Mellow (2009)

Thinking of You is an album by saxophonist Houston Person which was recorded in 2007 and released on the HighNote label.

== Reception ==
Professional ratings
Review scores
Source	Rating
Allmusic	3.5/5 stars
The Penguin Guide to Jazz Recordings	3.5/4 stars

In his review on Allmusic, Michael G. Nastos states "Person, one of the more consistent jazz performers over the past few decades, is reliable primarily for his soft soul, which holds him and his fans in good stead. This CD is no less enjoyable than many others he has recently released, and is easily recommended". On All About Jazz, Karla Cornejo Villavincencio noted "On tracks like "Why Did I Choose You?" and "People," he exhibits a dexterity that most contemporary jazz musicians would envy". In JazzTimes, William Ruhlmann wrote: "the album provides numerous examples of Person’s usual virtues, not the least of them his abilities as a blues player ... this sounds like an album that could have been made any time in the last 40 years, but that only confirms Person’s consistency".

== Track listing ==
1. "Rock Me to Sleep" (Benny Carter, Paul Vandervoort) – 5:09
2. "People" (Jule Styne, Bob Merrill) – 5:18
3. "Thinking of You" (Harry Ruby, Bert Kalmar) – 4:53
4. "I Didn't Know What Time It Was" (Richard Rodgers, Lorenz Hart) – 6:54
5. "Brazilian Emerald" (Peter Hand) – 3:30
6. "Why Did I Choose You?" (Michael Leonard, Herbert Martin) – 5:39
7. "Black Coffee" (Sonny Burke, Paul Francis Webster) – 6:33
8. "Sing" (Joe Raposo) – 5:25
9. "Avant de Mourir (My Prayer)" ( Georges Boulanger, Carlos Gomez Barrera Jimmy Kennedy) – 4:37
10. "When October Goes" (Barry Manilow, Johnny Mercer) – 2:33
11. "Medley: That Sunday, That Summer/Funny" (Joe Sherman, George David Weiss/Hughie Prince, Marcia Neil, Philip Broughton, Merrill) – 4:32

== Personnel ==
- Houston Person – tenor saxophone
- Eddie Allen – trumpet (tracks 1, 2, 5 & 8)
- John Di Martino – piano (tracks 1–10)
- James Chirillo – guitar (tracks 1–9 & 11)
- Ray Drummond – bass (tracks 1–9)
- Willie Jones III – drums (tracks 1–9)
