= Suspicions (album) =

Studio album by Houston Person
- Released: 1980
- Recorded: April 24, 1980
- Studio: Van Gelder Studio, Englewood Cliffs, NJ
- Genre: Jazz
- Length: 36:17
- Label: Muse; MR 5199
- Producer: Houston Person

Houston Person chronology
The Gospel Soul of Houston Person (1978)	Suspicions (1980)	Very PERSONal (1980)

Suspicions is an album by saxophonist Houston Person recorded in 1980 and released on the Muse label.

== Reception ==
Professional ratings
Review scores
Source	Rating
Allmusic	3/5 stars

Allmusic awarded the album 3 stars noting that it contains "Some robust funk and fine soul licks, plus solid mainstream fare".

== Track listing ==
1. "Suspicions" (Eddie Rabbitt, David Malloy, Randy McCormick, Even Stevens) - 5:26
2. "If" (David Gates) - 3:55
3. "Me & Me Brudder" (Sonny Phillips) - 3:25
4. "Pieces" (Horace Ott) - 5:07
5. "Blue Monk" (Thelonious Monk) - 8:42
6. "This Bitter Earth" (Clyde Otis) - 4:44
7. "Let's Love Again" (Ott) - 4:58

== Personnel ==
- Houston Person - tenor saxophone
- Virgil Jones - trumpet
- Jack Cavari, Melvin Sparks - guitar
- Ernie Hayes, Horace Ott, Sonny Phillips - keyboards
- Wilbur Bascomb - bass
- Idris Muhammad - drums
- Ralph Dorsey - percussion
