= Blue Odyssey =

Studio album by Houston Person
- Released: 1968
- Recorded: March 12, 1968
- Studio: New York City
- Genre: Jazz
- Length: 36:28
- Label: Prestige; PR 7566
- Producer: Don Schlitten

Houston Person chronology
Trust in Me (1967)	Blue Odyssey (1968)	Soul Dance! (1968)

Blue Odyssey is the fourth album led by saxophonist Houston Person which was recorded in 1968 and released on the Prestige label.

== Reception ==
Professional ratings
Review scores
Source	Rating
AllMusic	4/5 stars
The Penguin Guide to Jazz Recordings	3/4 stars

AllMusic reviewer Scott Yanow stated: "Houston Person, the definitive soul-jazz tenor saxophonist of the past 30 years, is in excellent form on this early session."

== Track listing ==
All compositions by Cedar Walton, except where indicated.

1. "Blue Odyssey" – 7:42
2. "Holy Land" – 6:45
3. "I Love You Yes I Do" (Henry Glover, Sally Nix) – 3:45
4. "Funky London" (Cal Massey) – 4:53
5. "Please Send Me Someone to Love" (Percy Mayfield) – 7:14
6. "Starrburst" (Ellen Starr) – 6:09

== Personnel ==
- Houston Person – tenor saxophone
- Curtis Fuller – trombone
- Pepper Adams – baritone saxophone
- Cedar Walton – piano
- Bob Cranshaw – bass
- Frank Jones – drums
