= Christmas with Etta Jones =

Studio album by Etta Jones
- Released: 1990
- Recorded: June 14–15, 1990
- Studio: Van Gelder Studio, Englewood Cliffs, NJ
- Genre: Jazz
- Length: 47:55
- Label: Muse; MR 5411
- Producer: Houston Person

Etta Jones chronology
Sugar (1990)	Christmas with Etta Jones (1990)	Reverse the Charges (1993)

Christmas with Etta Jones is a Christmas album by vocalist Etta Jones which was recorded in 1990 and released on the Muse label.

== Reception ==
Professional ratings
Review scores
Source	Rating
AllMusic	3/5 stars

The AllMusic review by Scott Yanow stated "The fine vocalist Etta Jones sings nine mostly-familiar Christmas-related songs on this 1990 CD. Nothing all that memorable occurs ... but the overall results are pleasing".

== Track listing ==
1. "It's Christmas Time" (Gloria Coleman) – 4:27
2. "Have Yourself a Merry Little Christmas" (Hugh Martin, Ralph Blane) – 5:06
3. "Santa Claus Is Coming to Town" (John Frederick Coots, Haven Gillespie) – 8:41
4. "The Christmas Song" (Bob Wells, Mel Tormé) – 5:15
5. "Merry Christmas Baby" (Lou Baxter, Johnny Moore) – 5:29
6. "What Are You Doing New Year's Eve?" (Frank Loesser) – 7:53
7. "Ring the Bells" (Coleman) – 3:54
8. "(I'm Dreaming of a) White Christmas" (Irving Berlin) – 3:37
9. "I'll Be Home for Christmas" (Walter Kent, Buck Ram, Kim Gannon) – 3:10 Bonus track on CD reissue

== Personnel ==
- Etta Jones – vocals
- Johnny Coles – flugelhorn (tracks 1, 5 & 7)
- Bill Easley – tenor saxophone, flute (tracks 1, 5 & 7)
- Houston Person – tenor saxophone (tracks 2–4 & 8)
- Randy Johnston – guitar
- Stan Hope – piano (tracks 2–4 & 8)
- Horace Ott – keyboards (tracks 1, 5 & 7)
- George Devens – vibraphone
- Wilbur Bascomb – bass
- Cecil Brooks III – drums
- Sammy Figueroa – congas, percussion (tracks 1, 5 & 7)
