= From the Heart (Etta Jones album) =

Studio album by Etta Jones
- Released: 1962
- Recorded: February 8 & 9, 1962
- Studio: Van Gelder Studio, Englewood Cliffs, New Jersey
- Genre: Vocal jazz
- Length: 29:39
- Label: Prestige; PRLP 7214
- Producer: Esmond Edwards

Etta Jones chronology
So Warm (1961)	From the Heart (1962)	Lonely and Blue (1962)

From the Heart is an album by jazz vocalist Etta Jones which was recorded in early 1962 and released on the Prestige label.

== Reception ==
Professional ratings
Review scores
Source	Rating
AllMusic	3/5 stars

Scott Yanow of AllMusic states, "From the Heart is a lot of fun, a too-long-forgotten gem that takes the listener back to a more innocent time and provides the perfect setting for Etta Jones to display her vocal wares".

== Track listing ==
1. "Just Friends" (John Klenner, Sam M. Lewis) – 3:00
2. "By the Bend of the River" (Clara Edwards) – 2:14
3. "Makin' Whoopee" (Walter Donaldson, Gus Kahn) – 2:50
4. "You Came a Long Way from St. Louis" (John Benson Brooks, Bob Russell) – 2:26
5. "Funny (Not Much)" (Scott Edward, Larry Holofcener) – 3:07
6. "They Can't Take That Away from Me" (George Gershwin, Ira Gershwin) – 2:07
7. "I'll Never Be Free" (Bennie Benjamin, George Weiss) – 3:05
8. "(I'm Afraid) the Masquerade Is Over" (Herb Magidson, Allie Wrubel) – 2:56
9. "Good Morning Heartache" (Ervin Drake, Dan Fisher, Irene Higginbotham) – 2:33
10. "Look for the Silver Lining" (Buddy DeSylva, Jerome Kern) – 2:27
11. "There Goes My Heart" (Benny Davis, Abner Silver) – 3:17
- Recorded at Van Gelder Studio in Englewood Cliffs, New Jersey on February 8, 1962 (tracks 1, 5, 7 & 11) and February 9, 1962 (tracks 2–4, 6 & 8–10)

== Personnel ==
- Etta Jones – vocals
- Lloyd Mayers – piano
- Wally Richardson – guitar
- Bob Bushnell – bass
- Ed Shaughnessy – drums
- horn section added on tracks 3, 4, 8, 10
  - Joe Wilder – trumpet
  - Jerry Dodgion, Oliver Nelson – alto saxophone
  - Bob Ashton, George Barrow – tenor saxophone
- unidentified string section added on tracks 1, 5, 7 & 11
- Arranged and conducted by Oliver Nelson.
