= At Last (Etta Jones album) =

Studio album by Etta Jones
- Released: 1995
- Recorded: April 21, 1993, and February 1, 1995
- Studio: Sear Sound, New York City
- Genre: Jazz
- Length: 52:52
- Label: Muse; MR 5511
- Producer: Houston Person

Etta Jones chronology
My Gentleman Friend (1994)	At Last (1995)	The Melody Lingers On (1997)

At Last is an album by vocalist Etta Jones that was recorded in 1993 and 1995 and released on the Muse label.

== Reception ==
Professional ratings
Review scores
Source	Rating
AllMusic	4/5 stars

The AllMusic review by Scott Yanow stated: "Throughout much of her last 40 years, Etta Jones found her name being continually mixed up with that of Etta James. So somehow it seems right then that she recorded James' trademark song 'At Last,' giving the piece her own spin and showing that Etta Jones is far from an imitation of Etta James. In a set that emphasizes swing standards, Jones turns everything into soulful blues, assisted by a top group."

== Track listing ==
1. "At Last" (Mack Gordon, Harry Warren) – 6:03
2. "You're a Sweetheart" (Jimmy McHugh, Harold Adamson) – 5:02
3. "God Bless the Child" (Billie Holiday, Arthur Herzog Jr.) – 5:48
4. "He's My Guy" (Gene de Paul, Don Raye) – 4:50
5. "Where Are You?" (McHugh, Adamson) – 5:16
6. "Wonder Why" (Nicholas Brodszky, Sammy Cahn) – 3:55
7. "I Can't Get Started" (Vernon Duke, Ira Gershwin) – 5:57
8. "If You Were Mine" (Matty Malneck, Johnny Mercer) – 5:53
9. "You're Driving Me Crazy" (Walter Donaldson) – 5:02
10. "Medley: A Cottage for Sale/Don't Take Your Love from Me" (Willard Robison, Larry Conley/Henry Nemo) – 5:06

== Personnel ==
- Etta Jones – vocals
- Houston Person – tenor saxophone
- Eddie Allen – trumpet (tracks 2, 4–6 & 8–10)
- Jimmy Hill – alto saxophone (tracks 2, 4–6 & 8–10)
- Benny Green (tracks 2, 4–6 & 8–10), Mike Renzi (tracks 1, 3 & 7) – piano
- Tom Aalfs – violin (tracks 1, 3 & 7)
- Ray Drummond (tracks 2, 4–6 & 8–10), Jay Leonhart (tracks 1, 3 & 5) – bass
- Winard Harper (tracks 2, 4–6 & 8–10), Grady Tate (tracks 1, 3 & 5) – drums
