= Rain or Shine (Houston Person album) =

Studio album by Houston Person
- Released: November 24, 2017
- Recorded: June 4, 2017
- Studio: Van Gelder Studio, Englewood Cliffs, NJ
- Genre: Jazz
- Length: 56:16
- Label: HighNote; HCD 7309
- Producer: Houston Person

Houston Person chronology
Chemistry (2015)	Rain or Shine (2017)	Remember Love (2018)

Rain or Shine is an album by saxophonist Houston Person which was recorded in 2017 and released on the HighNote label.

== Reception ==
Professional ratings
Review scores
Source	Rating
All About Jazz	3.5/5 stars
The Observer	4/5 stars
The Times	4/5 stars

On All About Jazz, Jack Bowers noted "Tenor saxophonist Houston Person, now in his eightieth decade, has made no concessions to Father Time, choosing instead to use his many years in the jazz trenches to forge a style all his own, bathed in blues and soul but never turning a deaf ear to the allure of a seductive and tasteful melody. Each of these components is clear as the midday sun on Rain or Shine, a well-designed studio session". In JazzTimes, Thomas Conrad wrote: "In the liner notes, Houston Person says, “Few people get into this kind of groove these days.” So true. It is the sensual, slightly sweaty, blues-based groove they used to call soul-jazz. It was central to the jazz art form (and to its commercial viability) in the 1960s. But in our current eclectic, experimental era, it is a quaint niche. When you hear an authentic voice of the genre like Person, you remember how easy it is to like this music ... The program contains standards, old R&B hits and lost gems ... The members of Person's sextet all speak this rich musical language as their native tongue". In The Observer, Dave Gelly said "Although he doesn't attract much critical attention, Houston Person must have a large and loyal following, judging by the number of albums he's made over the years. They’re a discriminating crowd, too, if this latest example is anything to go by. Ballads, blues, R&B classics – gently but unerringly his soulful tenor saxophone brings out their beauty, enhancing a melody with a few deft strokes. He can pick a good band, too". In The Times, Chris Pearson observed "Houston Person was playing tough tenor when Alexander was a babe in arms and is still going strong in every sense. On Rain or Shine the soul-jazz pioneer leads a sextet through a set made up mostly of crate-digging rhythm’n’blues tunes ... a tenor-sax tonic for the winter blues"

== Track listing ==
1. "Come Rain or Come Shine" (Harold Arlen, Johnny Mercer) – 6:23
2. "132nd and Madison" (Onaje Allan Gumbs) – 7:04
3. "Everything Must Change" (Bernard Ingher) – 6:59
4. "Learnin' the Blues" (Dolores Silvers) – 6:18
5. "I Wonder Where Our Love Has Gone" (Buddy Johnson) – 5:28
6. "Soupbone" (Rodney Jones) – 7:13
7. "Never Let Me Go" (Joseph Scott) – 5:08
8. "Our Day Will Come" (Mort Garson, Bob Hilliard) – 5:43
9. "Danny Boy" (Traditional) – 6:00

== Personnel ==
- Houston Person – tenor saxophone
- Warren Vache – cornet (tracks 1, 2, 4, 6 & 8)
- Lafayette Harris – piano
- Rodney Jones – guitar (tracks 1–6, 8 & 9)
- Matthew Parrish – bass
- Vincent Ector – drums
