= Save Your Love for Me =

1981 studio album by Etta Jones

Studio album by Etta Jones
- Released: 1981
- Recorded: July 8, 1980
- Studio: Van Gelder Studio, Englewood Cliffs, NJ
- Genre: Jazz
- Length: 39:03
- Label: Muse; MR 5333
- Producer: Houston Person

Etta Jones chronology
Love Me with All Your Heart (1984)	Save Your Love for Me (1981)	I'll Be Seeing You (1988)

Save Your Love for Me is an album by vocalist Etta Jones that was recorded in 1986 and released on the Muse label.

Professional ratings
Review scores
Source	Rating
AllMusic	4/5 stars

== Track listing ==
1. "Save Your Love for Me" (Buddy Johnson) – 5:00
2. "The One I Love (Belongs to Somebody Else)" (Isham Jones, Gus Kahn) – 3:06
3. "Georgia on My Mind" (Hoagy Carmichael, Stuart Gorrell) – 4:32
4. "My Man" (Jacques Charles, Channing Pollock, Albert Willemetz, Maurice Yvain) – 3:52
5. "The Man That Got Away" (Harold Arlen, Ira Gershwin) – 5:50
6. "Let's Beat Out Some Love" (Johnson) – 4:49
7. "Stardust" (Hoagy Carmichael, Mitchell Parish) – 4:24
8. "East of the Sun (and West of the Moon)" (Brooks Bowman) – 3:30

== Personnel ==
- Etta Jones – vocals
- Houston Person – tenor saxophone
- Cedar Walton – piano
- George Devens – vibraphone
- George Duvivier – bass
- Frankie Jones – drums
