= Something Nice =

Studio album by Etta Jones
- Released: 1961
- Recorded: September 16, 1960, and March 30, 1961
- Studio: Van Gelder Studio, Englewood Cliffs, New Jersey
- Genre: Vocal jazz
- Length: 36:53
- Label: Prestige; PRLP 7194
- Producer: Rudy Van Gelder

Etta Jones chronology
Don't Go to Strangers (1960)	Something Nice (1961)	So Warm (1961)

Something Nice is an album by jazz vocalist Etta Jones which was recorded in late 1960 and early 1961 and released on the Prestige label.

== Reception ==
Professional ratings
Review scores
Source	Rating
Allmusic	4/5 stars
The Penguin Guide to Jazz Recordings	3/4 stars

Scott Yanow of Allmusic states, "Influenced by Billie Holiday during this era, Jones is at her best during straightforward and sincere renditions".

== Track listing ==
1. "Through a Long and Sleepless Night" (Mack Gordon, Alfred Newman) – 2:57
2. "My Heart Tells Me" (Gordon, Harry Warren) – 2:52
3. "That's All There Is to That" (Clyde Otis, Kelly Owens) – 4:00
4. "Till There Was You" (Meredith Willson) – 2:08
5. "I Only Have Eyes for You" (Al Dubin, Warren) – 3:14
6. "Maybe You'll Be There" (Rube Bloom, Sammy Gallop) – 3:41
7. "Love Is the Thing" (Ned Washington, Victor Young) – 3:43
8. "Almost Like Being in Love" (Alan Jay Lerner, Frederick Loewe) – 2:44
9. "Easy Living" (Ralph Rainger, Leo Robin) – 4:55
10. "Canadian Sunset" (Norman Gimbel, Eddie Heywood) – 2:37
11. "Fools Rush In" (Bloom, Johnny Mercer) – 4:02
- Recorded at Van Gelder Studio in Englewood Cliffs, New Jersey, on September 16, 1960 (tracks 3, 5 & 8–10), and March 30, 1961 (tracks 1, 2, 4, 6, 7 & 11).

== Personnel ==
- Etta Jones – vocals
- Oliver Nelson – tenor saxophone (track 9)
- Lem Winchester – vibraphone (tracks 9 & 10)
- Wally Richardson – guitar (track 2, 4 & 6)
- Jimmy Neeley (tracks 1, 2, 4, 6, 7 & 11), Richard Wyands (tracks 3, 5 & 8–10) – piano
- George Duvivier (tracks 3, 5 & 8–10), Michel Mulia (tracks 1, 2, 4, 6, 7 & 11) – bass
- Roy Haynes (tracks 3, 5 & 8–10), Rudy Lawless (tracks 1, 2, 4, 6, 7 & 11) – drums
