= My Mother's Eyes (Etta Jones album) =

Studio album by Etta Jones
- Released: 1978
- Recorded: June 23, 1977
- Studios: Van Gelder Studio, Englewood Cliffs, NJ
- Genre: Jazz
- Length: 35:35
- Labels: Muse; MR 5145
- Producer: Houston Person

Etta Jones chronology
Ms. Jones to You (1977)	My Mother's Eyes (1978)	If You Could See Me Now (1979)

My Mother's Eyes is an album by vocalist Etta Jones which was recorded in 1977 and released on the Muse label.

== Reception ==
Professional ratings
Review scores
Source	Rating
AllMusic	4/5 stars

The AllMusic review by Scott Yanow stated "Although by the mid-1970s she had already been a professional singer for 30 years, Etta Jones was in reality just entering her musical prime. Having developed her individuality gradually through the years, she was heard at her very best during her long string of Muse recordings".

== Track listing ==
1. "The Way You Look Tonight" (Jerome Kern, Dorothy Fields) – 4:50
2. "Don't Misunderstand" (Gordon Parks) – 6:12
3. "Be My Love" (Nicholas Brodszky, Sammy Kahn) – 5:50
4. "You Do Something to Me" (Cole Porter) – 4:44
5. "My Mother's Eyes" (Abel Baer, L. Wolfe Gilbert) – 5:49
6. "This Girl's in Love with You" (Burt Bacharach, Hal David) – 3:59
7. "Gloomy Sunday" (Rezsö Seress, László Jávor) – 4:38

== Personnel ==
- Etta Jones – vocals
- Houston Person – tenor saxophone
- Sonny Phillips – keyboards
- Rufus Reid – bass
- George Devans – vibraphone
- Larry Killian – congas, percussion
- Idris Muhammad – drums
- Jimmy Ponder – guitar
