= Chocomotive =

Studio album by Houston Person
- Released: 1967
- Recorded: June 14, 1967
- Studio: New York City
- Genre: Jazz
- Length: 44:20
- Label: Prestige; PR 7517
- Producer: Don Schlitten

Houston Person chronology
Underground Soul! (1966)	Chocomotive (1967)	Trust in Me (1967)

Chocomotive is the second album led by saxophonist Houston Person which was recorded in 1967 and released on the Prestige label.

== Reception ==
Professional ratings
Review scores
Source	Rating
Allmusic	4/5 stars

Allmusic awarded the album 4 stars stating "Some jazz improvisers believe that appealing to R&B and pop fans is beneath them, but Houston Person never had that elitist mentality. The big-toned tenor titan was always a communicator; though he has first-rate chops and can easily sail through difficult bop changes, Person doesn't value pyrotechnics over feeling and emotion. Consequently, albums like Chocomotive have managed to reach a lot of R&B and pop fans who don't necessarily buy a lot of jazz".

== Track listing ==
All compositions by Cedar Walton except where noted.

1. "Chocomotive" – 7:48
2. "You're Gonna Hear From Me" (André Previn) – 3:48
3. "Close Quarters" – 7:39
4. "Girl Talk" (Neal Hefti, Bobby Troup) – 3:38
5. "Since I Fell for You" (Buddy Johnson) – 8:32
6. "Up, Up and Away" (Jimmy Webb) – 4:45
7. "More" (Riz Ortolani, Nino Oliviero) – 8:15

== Personnel ==
- Houston Person – tenor saxophone
- Cedar Walton – piano
- Bob Cranshaw – bass
- Alan Dawson – vibraphone
- Frank Jones – drums
