= Chemistry (Houston Person and Ron Carter album) =

Studio album by Houston Person and Ron Carter
- Released: June 17, 2016
- Recorded: December 22, 2015
- Studio: Van Gelder Studio, Englewood Cliffs, NJ
- Genre: Jazz
- Length: 49:25
- Label: HighNote; HCD 7293
- Producer: Houston Person

Houston Person chronology
| Something Personal (2015) | Chemistry (2016) | Rain or Shine (2017) |

Ron Carter chronology
| In Memory of Jim (2014) | Chemistry (2015) | An Evening with Ron Carter & Richard Galliano (2017) |

Chemistry is an album by saxophonist Houston Person and bassist Ron Carter recorded in late 2015 and released on the HighNote label the following year.

== Reception ==
Professional ratings
Review scores
| Source | Rating |
|---|---|
| AllMusic | 4/5 stars |

The AllMusic review by Matt Collar said "Chemistry is a deceptively simple conceit; just two jazz journeymen playing conversational duets on well-known jazz songs. At face value, that is certainly what you get. The deception enters into the equation with just how masterful and nuanced Person and Carter are in each song ... Ultimately, Chemistry is a lovely, heartfelt album of well-loved standards imbued with the duo's decades of experience". In JazzTimes, Mac Randall stated "What you get is pretty much what you’d expect: A menu of standards, served with reliable skill and unpretentious style, provides the setting for the latest installment of an ongoing, wide-ranging chat between old friends".

== Track listing ==
1. "Bye Bye Blackbird" (Ray Henderson, Mort Dixon) – 4:19
2. "But Beautiful" (Jimmy Van Heusen, Johnny Burke) – 6:08
3. "Young and Foolish" (Albert Hague, Arnold Horwitt) – 4:09
4. "Fools Rush In" (Rube Bloom, Johnny Mercer) – 7:09
5. "Can't We Be Friends?" (Kay Swift, Paul James) – 4:13
6. "Blame It on My Youth" (Oscar Levant, Edward Heyman) – 6:16
7. "I Didn't Know What Time It Was" (Richard Rodgers, Lorenz Hart) – 4:42
8. "I Can't Get Started" (Vernon Duke, Ira Gershwin) – 4:21
9. "Blue Monk" (Thelonious Monk) – 3:30
10. "When I Fall in Love" (Victor Young, Heyman) – 4:38

== Personnel ==
- Houston Person - tenor saxophone
- Ron Carter - bass
