= Truth! =

Studio album by Houston Person
- Released: 1970
- Recorded: February 23, 1970
- Studios: Van Gelder Studio, Englewood Cliffs, NJ
- Genre: Jazz
- Length: 41:43
- Labels: Prestige; PR 7767
- Producer: Bob Porter

Houston Person chronology
Goodness! (1969)	Truth! (1970)	Person to Person! (1970)

Truth! is the seventh album led by saxophonist Houston Person which was recorded in 1970 and released on the Prestige label.

== Reception ==
Professional ratings
Review scores
Source	Rating
Allmusic	4/5 stars

Allmusic awarded the album 4 stars stating "much of the music that Person recorded for Prestige was exciting and quite rewarding. Those who like their jazz with a heavy dose of R&B will find a lot to admire on this CD".

== Track listing ==
1. "Cissy Strut" (George Porter Jr., Ziggy Modeliste, Art Neville, Leo Nocentelli) - 8:35
2. "On the Avenue" (Ben Dixon) - 9:30
3. "If I Ruled the World" (Leslie Bricusse, Cyril Ornadel) - 3:22
4. "Wadin'" (Horace Parlan) - 8:40
5. "The Pulpit" (Sonny Phillips) - 5:03
6. "For Your Love" (Ed Townsend) - 5:20

== Personnel ==
- Houston Person - tenor saxophone
- Sonny Phillips - organ
- Billy Butler - guitar
- Bob Bushnell - electric bass
- Frankie Jones - drums
- Buddy Caldwell - congas
