= Naturally (Houston Person album) =

Studio album by Houston Person
- Released: October 9, 2012
- Recorded: July 5, 2012
- Studio: Van Gelder Studio, Englewood Cliffs, NJ
- Genre: Jazz
- Length: 52:18
- Label: HighNote; HCD 7245
- Producer: Houston Person

Houston Person chronology
So Nice (2011)	Naturally (2012)	Nice 'n' Easy (2013)

Naturally is an album by saxophonist Houston Person which was recorded in 2012 and released on the HighNote label.

== Reception ==
Professional ratings
Review scores
Source	Rating
AllMusic	4/5 stars

In his review on AllMusic, Steve Leggett states "whether he's doing soul-jazz, disco, R&B, or gospel, he's always had this easygoing, big-sounding sax tone that embraces and envelops rather than challenges listeners. This set, recorded in July of 2012 at the famed Van Gelder Recording Studio, finds Person assembling a jazz supergroup of sorts ... and together they make a joyous, smooth, and open sound that feels comfortable, warm, and, well, natural. ... everything here fits into the same sort of groove quilt that Person has been doing like no one else for years now. He's simply an American treasure". In JazzTimes, Sharonne Cohen noted "Houston Person still seems to be a discovery for some. Both newcomers to his music and longtime fans will no doubt enjoy this latest recording featuring a formidable group ... this throwback album is nonetheless fresh and imaginative. Aptly titled, it’s a relaxed, compelling set on which Person and his bandmates demonstrate unaffected dexterity, swing and soul".

== Track listing ==
1. "Bags' Groove" (Milt Jackson) – 7:09
2. "That's All" (Bob Haymes, Alan Brandt) – 5:52
3. "How Little We Know" (Phil Springer, Carolyn Leigh) – 4:29
4. "Namely You" (Gene de Paul, Johnny Mercer) – 6:53
5. "My Foolish Heart" (Victor Young, Ned Washington) – 6:34
6. "Red Sails in the Sunset" (Hugh Williams, Jimmy Kennedy) – 4:25
7. "Don'cha Go 'Way Mad" (Illinois Jacquet, Jimmy Mundy, Al Stillman) – 5:38
8. "It Shouldn't Happen to a Dream" (Duke Ellington, Don George, Johnny Hodges) – 5:54
9. "Sunday" (Chester Conn, Jule Styne, Bennie Krueger, Ned Miller) – 5:24

== Personnel ==
- Houston Person – tenor saxophone
- Cedar Walton – piano
- Ray Drummond – bass
- Lewis Nash – drums
