= Always on My Mind (Houston Person album) =

Studio album by Houston Person
- Released: 1986
- Recorded: September 3, 1985
- Studio: Sound Heights, Brooklyn, NY
- Genre: Jazz
- Length: 34:53
- Label: Muse; MR 5289
- Producer: Houston Person

Houston Person chronology
Heavy Juice (1982)	Always on My Mind (1986)	The Talk of the Town (1987)

Always on My Mind is an album by saxophonist Houston Person featuring jazz versions of pop hits recorded in 1985 and released on the Muse label early the following year.

Professional ratings
Review scores
Source	Rating
Allmusic	2/5 stars

== Track listing ==
1. "I Can't Help Myself" (Brian Holland, Lamont Dozier, Eddie Holland) − 4:30
2. "Always on My Mind" (Johnny Christopher, Mark James, Wayne Carson) − 5:28
3. "Endlessly" (Brook Benton, Clyde Otis) − 7:08
4. "How Do You Keep the Music Playing?" (Michel Legrand, Alan Bergman, Marilyn Bergman) − 6:14
5. "Cutie Pie" (Al Hudson, Dave Roberson, George Morgan, Corky Meadows, Terence Dudle) − 5:35
6. "I Might Be You (Theme from Tootsie)" (Dave Grusin, Alan Bergman, Marilyn Bergman) − 5:58

== Personnel ==
- Houston Person − tenor saxophone
- David Braham − organ, electric piano
- Ted Brancato − piano, keyboards
- Wilbur Bascomb − bass
- Bernard Purdie − drums
- Ralph Dorsey − percussion
