= Remember Love (Houston Person and Ron Carter album) =

Album by saxophonist Houston Person and bassist Ron Carter

Studio album by Houston Person and Ron Carter
- Released: October 2018
- Recorded: March 27, 2018
- Studios: Van Gelder Studio, Englewood Cliffs, NJ
- Genre: Jazz
- Labels: HighNote; HCD 7315
- Producer: Houston Person

Houston Person chronology
Rain or Shine (2017)	Remember Love (2018)

Ron Carter chronology
An Evening with Ron Carter & Richard Galliano (2017)	Remember Love (2018)

Remember Love is an album by saxophonist Houston Person and bassist Ron Carter recorded in 2018 and released on the HighNote label. It is the sixth album of duets that the two musicians have released.

== Reception ==
Professional ratings
Review scores
Source	Rating
All About Jazz	3.5/5 stars
The Times	4/5 stars

The All About Jazz review by Jack Bowers said "The mood throughout is cool and mellow, which is what Person and Carter do best. If you must revisit these explicitly warm and popular themes, you couldn't choose more amiable companions with whom to undertake the journey". The Times critic wrote: "In this tribute to togetherness the saxophonist Houston Person and the bass player Ron Carter take eight vintage ballads, plus a brace of originals, and play them without any other assistance. Jazz duos can be somewhat scholarly — too raw to be romantic — but as in the best relationships this pair’s myriad qualities make the mood work". In JazzTimes, Britt Robson stated "A particularly notable charm of their combination is that Carter, the ostensible “rhythm” player, is the alpha figure. Houston Person will forever be recognized for his enveloping sound and reliably melodic approach, the plush tone and slyly inventive romanticism he derives from his horn. It's as majestic and roomy as a yacht, providing Carter the space to roam freely while piling up deftly sophisticated incisions and counterpoints to both his partner's robust saxophone phrases and the venerable songs at hand".

== Track listing ==
1. "Love Is Here to Stay" (George Gershwin, Ira Gershwin) – 6:57
2. "My One and Only Love" (Guy Wood, Robert Mellin) – 4:37
3. "Why Not" (Houston Person) – 6:10
4. "Day Dream" (Billy Strayhorn, Duke Ellington) – 5:01
5. "Gentle Rain" (Luiz Bonfá) – 6:23
6. "The Way You Look Tonight" (Jerome Kern, Dorothy Fields) – 4:28
7. "You Are My Sunshine" (Jimmie Davis) – 5:43
8. "Blues For D.P." (Ron Carter) – 5:32
9. "Easy to Remember" (Richard Rodgers, Lorenz Hart) – 4:47
10. "Without a Song" (Vincent Youmans, Billy Rose, Edward Eliscu) – 3:03

== Personnel ==
- Houston Person - tenor saxophone
- Ron Carter - bass
