= Lonely and Blue (Etta Jones album) =

Studio album by Etta Jones
- Released: 1962
- Recorded: April 6 and May 4, 1962
- Studio: Van Gelder Studio, Englewood Cliffs, New Jersey
- Genre: Vocal jazz
- Length: 49:20 CD reissue with bonus tracks
- Label: Prestige; PRLP 7241
- Producer: Esmond Edwards

Etta Jones chronology
From the Heart (1962)	Lonely and Blue (1962)	Hollar! (1960–62)

Lonely and Blue is an album by jazz vocalist Etta Jones which was recorded in 1962 and released on the Prestige label.

== Reception ==
Professional ratings
Review scores
Source	Rating
Allmusic	3/5 stars
The Penguin Guide to Jazz Recordings	3.5/4 stars

The Allmusic site awarded the album three stars, stating: "Singer Etta Jones often recalls late-period Billie Holiday and Dinah Washington."

== Track listing ==
1. "I'll Be There" (Howard Cook) – 2:55
2. "In the Dark" (Lil Green) – 2:55
3. "Out in the Cold Again" (Rube Bloom, Ted Koehler) – 3:16
4. "I'm Pulling Through" (Arthur Herzog, Jr., Irene Kitchings) – 3:37
5. "My Gentleman Friend" (Arnold B. Horwitt, Richard Lewine) – 2:20
6. "I Wonder" (Cecil Gant) – 3:20
7. "You Don't Know My Mind" (Clarence Williams) – 3:51
8. "Gee, Baby, Ain't I Good to You" (Andy Razaf, Don Redman) – 3:09
9. "Good-For-Nothin' Joe" (Bloom, Koehler) – 3:50
10. "I Miss You So" (Jimmy Henderson, Sid Robin, Bertha Scott) – 3:26 (orig. by The Cats and the Fiddle)
11. "Trav'lin' Light" (Johnny Mercer, Jimmy Mundy, Trummy Young) – 3:43
12. "But Not for Me" (George Gershwin, Ira Gershwin) – 4:28 Bonus track on CD reissue
13. "If You Are But a Dream" (Nat Bonx, Jack Fulton, Moe Jaffe) – 4:22 Bonus track on CD reissue
14. "Cool Cool Daddy" (Traditional) – 4:50 Bonus track on CD reissue
- Recorded at Van Gelder Studio in Englewood Cliffs, New Jersey on April 6, 1962 (tracks 1, 2, 4, 6, 7, 9 & 10), April 13, 1962 (tracks 12–14) and May 4, 1962 (tracks 3, 5, 8 & 11)

== Personnel ==
- Etta Jones – vocals
- Gene Ammons (tracks 12–14), Budd Johnson (tracks 3, 5, 8 & 11) – tenor saxophone
- Patti Bown – piano
- Wally Richardson – guitar (tracks 1, 2, 4, 6, 7, 9 & 10)
- Art Davis (tracks 3, 5, 8 & 11), George Duvivier (tracks 1, 2, 4, 6, 7, 9, 10 & 12–14) – bass
- Walter Perkins (tracks 12–14), Ed Shaughnessy (tracks 1–11) – drums
