= My Romance (Houston Person album) =

Studio album by Houston Person
- Released: October 20, 1998
- Recorded: June 1, 1998
- Studio: Van Gelder Studio, Englewood Cliffs, NJ
- Genre: Jazz
- Length: 49:23
- Label: HighNote; HCD 7033
- Producer: Houston Person

Houston Person chronology
The Opening Round (1997)	My Romance (1998)	Soft Lights (1999)

My Romance is an album by the saxophonist Houston Person, recorded in 1998 and released on the HighNote label.

== Reception ==
Professional ratings
Review scores
Source	Rating
AllMusic	4/5 stars
The Penguin Guide to Jazz Recordings	3.5/4 stars

In his review on AllMusic, Dave Nathan states: "Person uses his knowledge and experience to revisit nine very familiar standards with his big, full-bodied, soulful tenor saxophone. ... Given the very intimate nature of the session, this recording could easily have been of a live performance from a small, smoky lounge. All that's missing are the tinkling glasses in the background and the light, knowledgeable applause of jazz fans who've dropped by to enjoy an evening of good music played by top jazz musicians. Those who prefer a harsh, more cutting element to their music may find this album somewhat too slick for their tastes. This session is a reminder of the pleasures that the intimate side of jazz offers."

== Track listing ==
1. "But Beautiful" (Jimmy Van Heusen, Johnny Burke) – 6:12
2. "Blue Moon" (Richard Rodgers, Lorenz Hart) – 5:46
3. "Laura" (David Raksin, Johnny Mercer) – 7:30
4. "The Very Thought of You" (Ray Noble) – 4:55
5. "Mean to Me" (Fred E. Ahlert, Roy Turk) – 7:37
6. "My Romance" (Rodgers, Hart) – 5:39
7. "Stairway to the Stars" (Matty Malneck, Frank Signorelli, Mitchell Parish) – 5:41
8. "Love Is Here to Stay" (George Gershwin Ira Gershwin) – 4:59
9. "Time After Time" (Jule Styne, Sammy Cahn) – 6:45

== Personnel ==
- Houston Person – tenor saxophone
- Richard Wyands – piano
- Ray Drummond – bass
- Kenny Washington – drums
