= Sugar (Etta Jones album) =

Studio album by Etta Jones
- Released: 1990
- Recorded: October 18 and 30, 1989
- Studio: Van Gelder Studio, Englewood Cliffs, NJ
- Genre: Jazz
- Length: 41:45
- Label: Muse; MR 5379
- Producer: Houston Person

Etta Jones chronology
I'll Be Seeing You (1988)	Sugar (1990)	Christmas with Etta Jones (1990)

Sugar is an album by vocalist Etta Jones which was recorded in 1989 and released on the Muse label.

== Reception ==
Professional ratings
Review scores
Source	Rating
AllMusic	4/5 stars

The AllMusic review by Scott Yanow stated "Etta Jones' long string of recordings during the final part of her career for Muse and High Note are some of the most rewarding of her life. Her voice was naturally not as youthful as earlier and her range gradually shrunk, but she was very soulful and had a way of wailing out notes that made each song her own. On Sugar, the first four numbers have her joined by a rhythm section that is hurt slightly by Horace Ott's dated-sounding keyboards. The other four numbers have more suitable accompaniment".

== Track listing ==
1. "Sugar" (Maceo Pinkard, Edna Alexander, Sidney D. Mitchell) – 4:36
2. "So I Love You" (Carroll Coates) – 6:02
3. "That's All There Is to That" (Clyde Otis, Kelly Owens) – 4:42
4. "All the Way" (Jimmy Van Heusen, Sammy Cahn) – 6:18
5. "He's Funny That Way" (Neil Moret, Richard A. Whiting) – 4:20
6. "Blow Top Blues" (Leonard Feather, Jane Feather) – 5:55
7. "This Is Always" (Harry Warren, Mack Gordon) – 5:07
8. "Side by Side" (Harry M. Woods) – 4:45

== Personnel ==
- Etta Jones – vocals
- Houston Person – tenor saxophone
- George Devens – vibraphone
- Randy Johnston – guitar
- Stan Hope – piano (tracks 5–8)
- Horace Ott – keyboards (tracks 1–5)
- Wilbur Bascomb (tracks 1–4), Peter Martin Weiss (tracks 5–8) – bass
- Cecil Brooks III (tracks 1–4), Bertel Knox (tracks 5–8) – drums
- Ralph Dorsey – congas, percussion
- Earl Coleman (track 7), Della Griffin (track 8) – vocals
