= Reverse the Charges =

Studio album by Etta Jones
- Released: 1992
- Recorded: September 19, 1991, and January 28, 1992
- Studio: Sear Sound, New York City
- Genre: Jazz
- Length: 40:45
- Label: Muse; MR 5474
- Producer: Houston Person

Etta Jones chronology
Christmas with Etta Jones (1990)	Reverse the Charges (1992)	My Gentleman Friend (1994)

Reverse the Charges is an album by vocalist Etta Jones which was recorded in 1991 and 1992 and released on the Muse label.

== Reception ==
Professional ratings
Review scores
Source	Rating
AllMusic	4/5 stars

The AllMusic review by Scott Yanow stated "Etta Jones and Houston Person always made for a potent team. Jones, like Big Joe Turner, had the knack for turning everything into a blues even when the chord changes were radically different, and Person's bluesy tenor egged her on to some of her finest singing ... Jones' soulful delivery made each song sound like a logical part of her repertoire".

== Track listing ==
1. "Ma! He's Making Eyes at Me" (Con Conrad, Sidney Clare) – 5:32
2. "Say It Isn't So" (Irving Berlin) – 5:22
3. "Undecided" (Sid Robin, Charlie Shavers) – 5:42
4. "Someone to Watch Over Me" (George Gershwin, Ira Gershwin) – 5:12
5. "Reverse the Charges" (Mary Lou Williams, Paul Francis Webster) – 4:47
6. "P.S. I Love You" (Gordon Jenkins, Johnny Mercer) – 6:01
7. "I Could Have Danced All Night" (Frederick Loewe, Alan Jay Lerner) – 3:11
8. "Perdido" (Juan Tizol, Ervin Drake, Hans Lengsfelder) – 4:58

== Personnel ==
- Etta Jones – vocals
- Houston Person – tenor saxophone
- Philip Harper – trumpet
- Benny Green – piano
- Christian McBride – bass
- Winard Harper – drums
- Sammy Figueroa – congas, percussion
