= Fine and Mellow (Etta Jones album) =

Studio album by Etta Jones
- Released: 1987
- Recorded: October 21, 1986
- Studio: Van Gelder Studio, Englewood Cliffs, NJ
- Genre: Jazz
- Label: Muse; MR 5333
- Producer: Houston Person

Etta Jones chronology
| Love Me with All Your Heart (1984) | Fine and Mellow (1987) | I'll Be Seeing You (1988) |

Fine and Mellow is an album by vocalist Etta Jones which was recorded in 1986 and released on the Muse label.

Professional ratings
Review scores
| Source | Rating |
|---|---|
| AllMusic | 4/5 stars |

== Track listing ==
1. "I Laughed at Love" (Abner Silver, Benny Davis) – 4:13
2. "My Foolish Heart" (Victor Young, Ned Washington) – 4:37
3. "I May Be Wrong (but I Think You're Wonderful)" (Henry Sullivan, Harry Ruskin) – 4:25
4. "I Want a Little Boy" (Murray Mencher, Billy Moll) – 4:18
5. "Don't Worry 'bout Me" (Rube Bloom, Ted Koehler) – 4:30
6. "Orange Colored Sky" (Milton DeLugg, Willie Stein) – 3:59
7. "Fine and Mellow" (Billie Holiday) – 7:17

== Personnel ==
- Etta Jones – vocals
- Houston Person – tenor saxophone
- Stan Hope – piano
- Peter Weiss – bass
- Cecil Brooks III – drums
