= So Nice (Houston Person album) =

Studio album by Houston Person
- Released: October 11, 2011
- Recorded: June 22, 2011
- Studio: Van Gelder Studio, Englewood Cliffs, NJ
- Genre: Jazz
- Length: 59:27
- Label: HighNote; HCD 7229
- Producer: Houston Person

Houston Person chronology
Moment to Moment (2010)	So Nice (2011)	Naturally (2012)

So Nice is an album by saxophonist Houston Person which was recorded in 2011 and released on the HighNote label.

== Reception ==
Professional ratings
Review scores
Source	Rating
Allmusic	4.5/5 stars

In his review on Allmusic, Ken Dryden states "Houston Person is a very versatile veteran tenor saxophonist who tends to get overlooked in critics' polls, yet his extensive musical resumé is ample proof that he is a jazz master. This 2011 session ranges from a duet to septet, with everyone playing compact solos, keeping all but one under the six-minute mark, a lost art in modern jazz. ... Highly recommended". On All About Jazz, Greg Simmons noted " Houston Person isn't breaking any new ground with So Nice. He doesn't have to. He does what he does, and he does it really well".

== Track listing ==
1. "Blues Everywhere" (Shirley Scott) – 5:18
2. "All Too Soon" (Duke Ellington, Carl Sigman) – 5:39
3. "I Wished on the Moon" (Ralph Rainger, Dorothy Parker) – 3:33
4. "Kiss and Run" (Rene Denoncin, William Engvick, Jack Ledru) – 5:33
5. "So Nice" (Elmo Hope) – 4:07
6. "I've Grown Accustomed to Her Face" (Frederick Loewe, Alan Jay Lerner) – 5:00
7. "Close to You" (Burt Bacharach, Hal David) – 4:40
8. "Star Eyes" (Gene de Paul, Don Raye) – 5:08
9. "Minor Inconvenience" (Houston Person) – 4:41
10. "Easy Living" (Rainger, Leo Robin) – 4:25
11. "Everything I Love" (Cole Porter) – 4:58
12. "Stephen Sondheim Medley: Small World/Anyone Can Whistle" (Jule Styne, Stephen Sondheim/Sondheim) – 6:25

== Personnel ==
- Houston Person – tenor saxophone
- Warren Vache – cornet, flugelhorn (tracks 1–3 & 8)
- Mark Patterson – trombone (tracks 1, 5, 6, 8 & 9)
- John Di Martino – piano
- Howard Alden – guitar (tracks 1, 2 & 9–11)
- Ray Drummond – bass
- Lewis Nash – drums
