= Love Shout =

Studio album by Etta Jones
- Released: 1963
- Recorded: November 28, 1962, and February 4 & 12, 1963
- Studio: Van Gelder Studio, Englewood Cliffs, New Jersey
- Genre: Vocal jazz
- Length: 36:30
- Label: Prestige; PRLP 7272
- Producer: Ozzie Cadena

Etta Jones chronology
Hollar! (1963)	Love Shout (1963)	Jonah Jones Swings - Etta Jones Sings (1964)

Love Shout is an album by jazz vocalist Etta Jones which was recorded in late 1962 and early 1963 and released on the Prestige label.

== Reception ==
Professional ratings
Review scores
Source	Rating
Allmusic	2/5 stars
The Penguin Guide to Jazz Recordings	3/4 stars

The Allmusic site awarded the album 2 stars but stated "Jones is in excellent form on a wide variety of material... Although Etta Jones' finest work was made for Muse in the 1970s and '80s, the appealing singer is in good form on this LP-length program".

== Track listing ==
1. "Love Walked In" (George Gershwin, Ira Gershwin) – 2:30
2. "It's Magic" (Sammy Cahn, Jule Styne) – 4:44
3. "Like Someone in Love" (Johnny Burke, Jimmy Van Heusen) – 3:24
4. "The Gal from Joe's" (Duke Ellington, Irving Mills) – 4:07
5. "Hi-Lili, Hi-Lo" (Helen Deutsch, Bronisław Kaper) – 3:35
6. "If I Loved You" (Oscar Hammerstein II, Richard Rodgers) – 3:37
7. "There Are Such Things" (Stanley Adams, Abel Baer, George W. Meyer) – 4:54
8. "Some Day My Prince Will Come" (Frank Churchill, Larry Morey) – 3:01
9. "Old Folks" (Dedette Lee Hill, Willard Robison) – 4:13
10. "Some Enchanted Evening" (Hammerstein, Rodgers) – 2:25
- Recorded at Van Gelder Studio in Englewood Cliffs, New Jersey on November 28, 1962 (tracks 4–6), February 4, 1963 (tracks 7–10) and February 12, 1963 (tracks 1–3)

== Personnel ==
- Etta Jones – vocals
- Jerome Richardson – tenor saxophone (4), flute (tracks 5–6)
- Kenny Cox (1–3 & 7–8,10), Sam Bruno (4) – piano
- Larry Young (tracks 1–3 & 7–8,10), Sam Bruno (6) – organ
- Kenny Burrell (1–10), Bucky Pizzarelli (tracks 4–6) – guitar
- Ernest Hayes (tracks 4–6), Peck Morrison (tracks 1–3), George Tucker (tracks 7–10) – bass
- Bobby Donaldson (tracks 4–6), Oliver Jackson (tracks 1–3), Jimmie Smith (tracks 7–10) – drums
