= Houston Express (album) =

Studio album by Houston Person
- Released: 1971
- Recorded: April 8 & 9, 1971
- Studios: Van Gelder Studio, Englewood Cliffs, NJ
- Genre: Jazz
- Length: 38:23
- Labels: Prestige; PR 10017
- Producer: Bob Porter

Houston Person chronology
| Person to Person! (1970) | Houston Express (1971) | Broken Windows, Empty Hallways (1972) |

Houston Express is the ninth album led by saxophonist Houston Person. It was recorded April 8 & 9, 1971 and released on the Prestige label. To date, it has only been re-released on Compact Disc in South Africa.

== Reception ==
Professional ratings
Review scores
| Source | Rating |
|---|---|
| Allmusic | 4.5/5 stars |

Allmusic awarded the album 4½ stars stating "As period soul-jazz goes, this is considerably above the average. It's funky, but not in the bland crossover sense; there's a sense of jazz ensemble discipline to the arrangements, but it's still R&B-based enough to groove to".

== Track listing ==
1. "Young Gifted and Black" (Nina Simone, Weldon Irvine) - 5:15
2. "The Houston Express" (Horace Ott) - 5:48
3. "Enjoy" (Ott) - 4:55
4. "Give More Power to the People (For God's Sake)" (Eugene Record) - 3:40
5. "Chains of Love" (A. Nugetre) - 7:30
6. "Just My Imagination" (Norman Whitfield, Barrett Strong) - 5:35
7. "Lift Every Voice" (James Weldon Johnson, John Rosamond Johnson) - 5:40

== Personnel ==
- Houston Person - tenor saxophone
- Cecil Bridgewater (tracks 4–6), Harold "Money" Johnson (tracks 1–3 & 7), Thad Jones (tracks 1–3 & 7), Ernie Royal (tracks 1–3 & 7) - trumpet
- Garnett Brown, Jack Jeffers - trombone (tracks 1–3 & 7)
- Harold Vick - tenor saxophone, flute (tracks 1–3 & 7)
- Babe Clarke - baritone saxophone
- Paul Griffin - piano, electric piano (tracks 1–3 & 7)
- Jimmy Watson - organ
- Ernie Hayes - organ, electric piano (tracks 4–6)
- Billy Butler - guitar
- Jerry Jemmott - electric bass
- Bernard Purdie - drums
- Buddy Caldwell - congas
- Horace Ott - arranger, conductor (tracks 1–3 & 7)
