= Very Personal =

Very PERSONal

Studio album by Houston Person
- Released: 1981
- Recorded: August 29, 1980
- Studio: Van Gelder Studio, Englewood Cliffs, NJ
- Genre: Jazz
- Length: 40:52
- Label: Muse; MR 5231
- Producer: Houston Person

Houston Person chronology
Suspicions (1980)	Very PERSONal (1981)	Heavy Juice (1982)

Very PERSONal is an album by saxophonist Houston Person recorded in 1980 and released on the Muse label early the following year.

== Reception ==
Professional ratings
Review scores
Source	Rating
Allmusic	4.5/5 stars

Allmusic reviewer Ron Wynn noted the album was "A departure for tenor saxophonist Houston Person, normally a soul jazz, blues, funk, and ballads player. This is more mainstream jazz and hard bop ... All those who felt that Person couldn't play bop changes were left looking silly when this came out in 1980".

== Track listing ==
1. "Daydream" (Billy Strayhorn, Duke Ellington, John La Touche) − 4:13
2. "Peace" (Horace Silver) − 5:31
3. "Chicago Serenade" (Eddie Harris) − 6:19
4. "Steppin' into Beauty" (Rahsaan Roland Kirk) − 4:32
5. "I'll Let You Know" (Cedar Walton) − 6:20
6. "Berkshire Blues" (Randy Weston) − 7:36
7. "God Bless the Child" (Billie Holiday, Arthur Herzog, Jr.) − 6:21

== Personnel ==
- Houston Person − tenor saxophone
- Curtis Fuller − trombone
- Cedar Walton − piano
- Buster Williams − bass
- Vernel Fournier − drums
