= Underground Soul! =

Album by Houston Person

Studio album by Houston Person
- Released: 1966
- Recorded: June 16, 1966
- Studio: Van Gelder Studio, Englewood Cliffs, NJ
- Genre: Jazz
- Length: 34:35
- Label: Prestige; PR 7491
- Producer: Cal Lampley

Houston Person chronology
| Underground Soul! (1966) | Chocomotive (1967) |

Underground Soul! is the debut album by saxophonist Houston Person which was recorded in 1966 and released on the Prestige label.

== Reception ==
Professional ratings
Review scores
| Source | Rating |
|---|---|
| Allmusic | 2/5 stars |

Allmusic awarded the album 2 stars.

== Track listing ==
All compositions by Houston Person except as noted

1. "What The World Needs Now Is Love" (Hal David, Burt Bacharach) - 3:55
2. "Underground Soul" - 5:45
3. "The Pimp" - 3:45
4. "Tears" (Mark Levine) - 3:45
5. "Aleilula" (Edu Lobo, Roy Guerra) - 4:10
6. "Ballin'" (Danny Wright) - 5:50
7. "If You Could See Me Now" (Tadd Dameron, Carl Sigman) - 4:25
8. "Strike Up the Band" (George Gershwin, Ira Gershwin) - 3:00

== Personnel ==
- Houston Person - tenor saxophone
- Mark Levine - trombone
- Charles Boston - organ
- Frank Jones - drums
