= Moment to Moment (Houston Person album) =

Studio album by Houston Person
- Released: 2010
- Recorded: June 23, 2010
- Studio: Van Gelder Studio, Englewood Cliffs, NJ
- Genre: Jazz
- Length: 56:10
- Label: HighNote; HCD 7217
- Producer: Houston Person

Houston Person chronology
Mellow (2009)	Moment to Moment (2010)	So Nice (2011)

Moment to Moment is an album by saxophonist Houston Person which was recorded in 2010 and released on the HighNote label.

== Reception ==
Professional ratings
Review scores
Source	Rating
Allmusic	4.5/5 stars
All About Jazz	4/5 stars

In his review on Allmusic, Ken Dryden states "In his mid-seventies at the time of this record date, tenor saxophonist Houston Person shows no signs of slowing down; he's accompanied here by musicians who are, for the most part, at least a generation younger. Person's lush tone is a major part of the standards of the date". On All About Jazz, Greg Simmons noted "Those expecting a deeply relaxed, background-music affair may be in for a mild surprise. Person hasn't suddenly become a hyper-aggressive free-jazz screamer, but the disc opens at a quick pace and returns to it periodically throughout ... Moment to Moment has everything to be expected in a Houston Person album, then adding a little bit more, making it another fine entry in Person's string of excellent HighNote releases".

== Track listing ==
1. "Bleeker Street" (Houston Person) – 3:57
2. "I Cover the Waterfront" (Johnny Green, Edward Heyman) – 5:56
3. "Moment to Moment" (Henry Mancini, Johnny Mercer) – 4:45
4. "Freight Dance" (Ray Brown) – 4:33
5. "Don't Take Your Love from Me" (Henry Nemo) – 6:09
6. "E Nada Mais" (Durval Ferreira, Luís Fernando de Oliveira Freire) – 4:49
7. "Just the Way You Are" (Billy Joel) – 6:12
8. "Back in New Orleans" (Michael Dees) – 6:04
9. "All My Life" (Sam H. Stept, Sidney D. Mitchell) – 3:31
10. "Love Won't Let Me Wait" (Vinnie Barrett, Bobby Eli) – 5:47
11. "Nina Never Knew" (Louis Alter, Milton Drake) – 3:51

== Personnel ==
- Houston Person – tenor saxophone
- Terell Stafford – trumpet (tracks 1–4 & 6–11)
- John Di Martino – piano
- Randy Johnston – guitar (tracks 1, 5–8, 10 & 11)
- Ray Drummond – bass
- Willie Jones III – drums
