= The Talk of the Town (album) =

Studio album by Houston Person
- Released: 1987
- Recorded: January 23, 1987
- Studio: Van Gelder Studio, Englewood Cliffs, NJ
- Genre: Jazz
- Length: 39:26
- Label: Muse; MR 5331
- Producer: Houston Person

Houston Person chronology
Always on My Mind (1985)	The Talk of the Town (1987)	Basics (1987)

The Talk of the Town is an album by saxophonist Houston Person recorded in 1987 and released on the Muse label.

== Reception ==
Professional ratings
Review scores
Source	Rating
Allmusic	4.5/5 stars

Allmusic reviewer Scott Yanow noted "This Muse recording differs from many of tenor saxophonist Houston Person's previous ones in that Person is backed by a piano rather than an organ; he sounds inspired by the 'new' setting. ... A particularly strong effort by the very consistent tenor great".

== Track listing ==
1. "Only Trust Your Heart" (Benny Carter, Sammy Cahn) − 7:26
2. "Everything Happens to Me" (Hoagy Carmichael, Johnny Mercer) − 6:07
3. "Almost Like Being in Love" (Frederick Loewe, Alan Jay Lerner) − 6:53
4. "It's the Talk of the Town" (Jerry Livingston, Al J. Neiburg, Marty Symes) − 7:25
5. "Just for You" (Cecil Bridgewater) − 4:18
6. "I'll Never Be Free" (Bennie Benjamin, George David Weiss) − 7:30

== Personnel ==
- Houston Person − tenor saxophone
- Cecil Bridgewater − trumpet
- Stan Hope − piano
- Buster Williams − bass
- Grady Tate − drums
- Ralph Dorsey − percussion
