= So Warm =

Studio album by Etta Jones
- Released: 1961
- Recorded: June 9 and July 25 & 28, 1961
- Studio: Van Gelder Studio, Englewood Cliffs, New Jersey
- Genre: Vocal jazz
- Length: 37:57
- Label: Prestige; PRLP 7204
- Producer: Esmond Edwards

Etta Jones chronology
Something Nice (1961)	So Warm (1961)	From the Heart (1962)

So Warm is an album by jazz vocalist Etta Jones that was recorded in 1961 and released on the Prestige label.

== Reception ==
Professional ratings
Review scores
Source	Rating
Allmusic	3/5 stars
The Penguin Guide to Jazz Recordings	3/4 stars

The Allmusic site awarded the album 3 stars.

== Track listing ==
1. "Unchained Melody" (Alex North, Hy Zaret) – 4:16
2. "I Laughed at Love" (Benny Davis, Abner Silver) – 3:30
3. "You Don't Know What Love Is" (Gene de Paul, Don Raye) – 3:05
4. "Hurry Home" (Buddy Bernier, Bob Emmerich, Joseph Meyer) – 3:33
5. "I Wish I Didn't Love You So" (Frank Loesser) – 2:02
6. "You Better Go Now" (Irvin Graham, Bickley Reichmer) – 1:55
7. "And This Is My Beloved" (George Forrest, Robert Wright) – 3:00
8. "I'm Through With Love" (Gus Kahn, Fud Livingston, Matty Malneck) – 4:01
9. "If You Were Mine" (Malneck, Johnny Mercer) – 2:40
10. "Can You Look Me in the Eyes" (Ted McMichael) – 2:45
11. "How Deep Is the Ocean?" (Irving Berlin) – 3:30
12. "All My Life" (Sidney Mitchell, Sam H. Stept) – 3:40
- Recorded at Van Gelder Studio in Englewood Cliffs, New Jersey on June 9, 1961 (tracks 3, 5, 9 & 12), July 25, 1961 (tracks 2, 6, 7 & 10), and July 28, 1961 (tracks 1, 4, 8 & 11).

== Personnel ==
- Etta Jones – vocals
- Ray Alonge, Richard Berg, Joe Singer – French horn
- Phil Bodner, Arthur Clarke, Eric Dixon, Jerome Richardson – reeds
- Mal Waldron – piano
- George Duvivier – bass
- Bill English, Charlie Persip – drums
- Oliver Nelson – arranger, conductor
- Unidentified strings
