= The Opening Round =

Studio album by Houston Person
- Released: July 1, 1997
- Recorded: February 5, 1997
- Studios: Van Gelder Studio, Englewood Cliffs, NJ
- Genre: Jazz
- Length: 55:20
- Labels: Savant; SCD 2005
- Producer: Houston Person

Houston Person chronology
Person-ified (1996)	The Opening Round (1997)	My Romance (1998)

The Opening Round, subtitled The Groove Masters Series Vol. 1 is an album by saxophonist Houston Person which was recorded in 1997 and released on the Savant label.

== Reception ==
Professional ratings
Review scores
Source	Rating
Allmusic	3/5 stars
The Penguin Guide to Jazz Recordings	3/4 stars

In his review on Allmusic, Stewart Mason states "A fun and personable mix of jazz and soul classics plus a couple of originals by guitarist Rodney Jones, Houston Person's The Opening Round: Groove Masters Series, Vol. 1 isn't a jazz album for the ages, but it's start-to-finish entertaining. It's a straight-up groove album, with Person in front of a four-piece organ combo". In JazzTimes, Stanley Dance wrote: "Person’s thick, unmannered tone, love of melody and swing, together give his music an odd sobriety that he seems compelled to relieve with fast flurries of notes".

== Track listing ==
1. "Sweet Sucker" (Johnny Griffin) – 1:27
2. "Let's Stay Together" (Al Green, Al Jackson Jr., Willie Mitchell) – 3:56
3. "Can't Help Lovin' That Man" (Jerome Kern, Oscar Hammerstein II) – 4:06
4. "What's Going On?" (Marvin Gaye, Renaldo Benson, Al Cleveland) – 2:32
5. "When a Man Loves a Woman" (Calvin Lewis, Andrew Wright) – 3:41
6. "Blue Spring" (Rodney Jones) – 4:35
7. "Song for a Rainbow" (Jones) – 3:57
8. "Shenandoah" (Traditional) – 4:55

== Personnel ==
- Houston Person – tenor saxophone
- Joey DeFrancesco – Hammond B3 organ
- Rodney Jones – guitar
- Tracy Wormworth – electric bass
- Bernard Purdie – drums
