= Nice 'n' Easy (Houston Person album) =

Studio album by Houston Person
- Released: October 22, 2013
- Recorded: June 22, 2011
- Studio: Van Gelder Studio, Englewood Cliffs, NJ
- Genre: Jazz
- Length: 55:47
- Label: HighNote; HCD 7257
- Producer: Houston Person

Houston Person chronology
Naturally (2012)	Nice 'n' Easy (2013)	The Melody Lingers On (2014)

Nice 'n' Easy is an album by saxophonist Houston Person which was recorded in 2013 and released on the HighNote label.

== Reception ==
Professional ratings
Review scores
Source	Rating
All About Jazz	4/5 stars

For All About Jazz, Jack Bowers wrote: "Those who have heard Houston Person before will know pretty much what to expect from Nice 'n' Easy; those who haven't are in for a pleasant ride. Even though Person never strays from conventional norms, neither does he undervalue the music or its import, lending every tune the full measure of his attentiveness and ardor". In JazzTimes, Owen Cordle wrote: "Person is a connoisseur of melody, and he solos in a way that honors the rhythms of those melodies. He can alter his tone from tender restraint to joyful shouts. He is ever-soulful and is as capable of extroverted double-timing (“Bluesology”) as he is of economical exposition (“Ill Wind”). More young saxophonists should study the gospel according to Person".

== Track listing ==
1. "Someday You'll Be Sorry" (Louis Armstrong) – 5:46
2. "All My Tomorrows" (Jimmy Van Heusen, Sammy Cahn) – 5:37
3. "Stolen Sweets" (Wild Bill Davis) – 5:01
4. "It's All in the Game" (Charles G. Dawes, Carl Sigman) – 4:05
5. "Nice 'n' Easy" (Lew Spence, Alan Bergman, Marilyn Bergman) – 5:41
6. "If It's the Last Thing I Do" (Saul Chaplin, Sammy Cahn) – 7:02
7. "Ill Wind" (Harold Arlen, Ted Koehler) – 5:51
8. "Let's Fall in Love" (Arlen, Koehler) – 3:53
9. "Sweet Life" (Tadd Dameron) – 7:02
10. "Bluesology" (Milt Jackson) – 5:49

== Personnel ==
- Houston Person – tenor saxophone
- John Di Martino – piano
- Chuck Redd – vibraphone
- Ray Drummond – bass
- Lewis Nash – drums
