= Soft Lights (album) =

Studio album by Houston Person
- Released: September 28, 1999
- Recorded: April 27, 1999
- Studio: Van Gelder Studio, Englewood Cliffs, NJ
- Genre: Jazz
- Length: 63:03
- Label: HighNote; HCD 7049
- Producer: Houston Person

Houston Person chronology
My Romance (1998)	Soft Lights (1999)	Together at Christmas (2000)

Soft Lights is an album by the saxophonist Houston Person, recorded in 1999 and released on the HighNote label.

== Reception ==
Professional ratings
Review scores
Source	Rating
AllMusic	4/5 stars
The Penguin Guide to Jazz Recordings	3/4 stars

In his review on AllMusic, Stewart Mason states: "As always with Person, the standards win. This isn't a bad place to start for those wondering which album from this era to get".

== Track listing ==
1. "Here's That Rainy Day" (Jimmy Van Heusen, Johnny Burke) – 5:07
2. "I Only Have Eyes for You" (Harry Warren, Al Dubin) – 4:37
3. "It Might as Well Be Spring" (Richard Rodgers, Oscar Hammerstein II) – 6:08
4. "Do Nothin' Till You Hear from Me" (Duke Ellingtonl Bob Russell) – 5:51
5. "At Last" (Warren, Mack Gordon) – 7:01
6. "The Night We Called It a Day" (Matt Dennis, Tom Adair) – 7:56
7. "It Shouldn't Happen to a Dream" (Ellington, Don George, Johnny Hodges) – 8:47
8. "I'll Be Around" (Alec Wilder) – 5:59
9. "Hey There" (Jerry Ross, Richard Adler) – 6:16
10. "If" (David Gates) – 5:21

== Personnel ==
- Houston Person – tenor saxophone
- Richard Wyands – piano
- Russell Malone – guitar
- Ray Drummond – bass
- Grady Tate – drums
