= Heavy Juice =

Studio album by Houston Person
- Released: 1982
- Recorded: June 24, 1982
- Studio: Van Gelder Studio, Englewood Cliffs, NJ
- Genre: Jazz
- Length: 31:54
- Label: Muse; MR 5260
- Producer: Houston Person

Houston Person chronology
Very PERSONal (1980)	Heavy Juice (1982)	Always on My Mind (1985)

Heavy Juice is an album by saxophonist Houston Person recorded in 1982 and released on the Muse label.

== Reception ==
Professional ratings
Review scores
Source	Rating
Allmusic	4/5 stars

Allmusic awarded the album 4 stars stating "Virtually all of Houston Person's Muse recordings are easily recommended".

== Track listing ==
1. "Heavy Juice" (Tiny Bradshaw, Red Prysock, Ralph Bass) - 2:46
2. "Summertime" (George Gershwin, DuBose Heyward) - 5:11
3. "Theme from Loveboat" (Charles Fox, Paul Williams) - 3:57
4. "Never Let Me Go" (Joseph Scott) - 4:34
5. "Let the Feeling Flow" (Peabo Bryson) - 4:04
6. "Please Send Me Someone to Love" (Percy Mayfield) - 5:06
7. "The Texas Shuffle" (Herschel Evans, Edgar Battle) - 2:59
8. "Blue Hue" (Houston Person) - 3:17

== Personnel ==
- Houston Person - tenor saxophone
- Melvin Sparks - guitar (tracks 1,2,3,4,5,6,7)
- Jon Logan - organ (tracks 1,4,6,7)
- David Braham - electric piano, arp string synthesizer (tracks 2,3,5,8)
- Wilbur Bascomb - bass (tracks 2,3,5)
- Billy James - drums (tracks 1,4,6,7)
- Bernard Purdie - drums (tracks 2,3,5)
- Ralph Dorsey - percussion (tracks 2,3,5)
- Horace Ott - arrangement (tracks 3,5)
