= Mellow (Houston Person album) =

Studio album by Houston Person
- Released: October 20, 2009
- Recorded: June 23, 2009
- Studio: Van Gelder Studio, Englewood Cliffs, NJ
- Genre: Jazz
- Length: 55:40
- Label: HighNote; HCD 7206
- Producer: Houston Person

Houston Person chronology
Thinking of You (2007)	Mellow (2009)	Moment to Moment (2010)

Mellow is an album by saxophonist Houston Person which was recorded in 2009 and released on the HighNote label.

== Reception ==
Professional ratings
Review scores
Source	Rating
Allmusic	3.5/5 stars

In his review on Allmusic, Michael G. Nastos states "Not all mellow, Houston Person's tribute to the softer side of jazz has its moments based on the laid-back timbre of his soul rather than a program consisting of only ballads. The tenor sax he wields certainly reflects the tradition established by Ben Webster in its soul-drenched tone, but is not as vocally pronounced or vibrato-driven. ... That's not to say this marvelous tenor saxophonist has depreciated his talent as an adept technician, but at this point in his career he prefers this music on the mellow side, and has no problem staying interested in that mood, no matter the tempo". On All About Jazz, Andrew Velez noted "Houston Person's Mellow could easily have been called "Up Close and Personal." With dozens and dozens of recordings to his credit, it's just the latest in a long list of exemplary sets that always evidence the warmth of his tone and the directness of his tenor sax phrasing. Also mixed in as well is a funky R&B feeling".

== Track listing ==
1. "Sunny" (Bobby Hebb) – 5:44
2. "Too Late Now" (Burton Lane, Alan Jay Lerner) – 6:27
3. "In a Mellow Tone" (Duke Ellington, Milt Gabler) – 4:56
4. "To Each His Own" (Jay Livingston, Ray Evans) – 4:56
5. "What a Difference a Day Made" (María Grever, Stanley Adams) – 6:10
6. "Two Different Worlds" (Al Frisch, Sid Wayne) – 4:16
7. "Blues in the AM" (Houston Person) – 6:42
8. "Who Can I Turn To?" (Leslie Bricusse, Anthony Newley) – 5:34
9. "God Bless the Child" (Arthur Herzog Jr., Billie Holiday) – 7:42
10. "Lester Leaps In" (Lester Young) – 3:13

== Personnel ==
- Houston Person – tenor saxophone
- John Di Martino – piano
- James Chirillo – guitar
- Ray Drummond – bass
- Lewis Nash – drums
