= Person to Person! =

Studio album by Houston Person
- Released: 1970
- Recorded: October 12, 1970
- Studios: Van Gelder Studio, Englewood Cliffs, New Jersey
- Genre: Jazz
- Labels: Prestige; PR 10003
- Producer: Bob Porter

Houston Person chronology
Truth! (1970)	Person to Person! (1970)	Houston Express (1971)

Person to Person! is the eighth album led by saxophonist Houston Person which was recorded in 1970 and released on the Prestige label.

== Reception ==
Professional ratings
Review scores
Source	Rating
Allmusic	3/5 stars

Allmusic awarded the album 3 stars calling it "Soul-jazz that inclines more to the "soul" part of the compound than many such Prestige efforts of the time".

== Track listing ==
All compositions by Houston Person except as indicated

1. "The Son of Man" (Harold Ousley) - 8:30
2. "Teardrops" (Bunny Biggs) - 4:35
3. "Close to You" (Burt Bacharach, Hal David) - 5:15
4. "Drown in My Own Tears" (Henry Glover) - 7:15
5. "Up at Joe's, Down at Jim's" - 8:45
6. "Yester-Me, Yester-You, Yesterday" (Brian Wells, Ron Miller) - 4:30

== Personnel ==
- Houston Person - tenor saxophone
- Virgil Jones - trumpet
- Sonny Phillips - organ, electric piano (tracks 3 & 6)
- Grant Green - guitar
- Jimmy Lewis - electric bass
- Idris Muhammad - drums
- Buddy Caldwell - congas
