= Etta Jones Sings =

Studio album by Etta Jones
- Released: 1966
- Recorded: 1965
- Studio: New York City
- Genre: Vocal jazz
- Length: 36:30
- Label: Roulette; R/SR 25329
- Producer: Henry Glover

Etta Jones chronology
Jonah Jones Swings - Etta Jones Sings (1964)	Etta Jones Sings (1966)	Etta Jones '75 (1975)

Etta Jones Sings (a.k.a. Etta Jones Sings with Junior Mance and Kenny Burrell) is an album by jazz vocalist Etta Jones which was recorded in 1965 and released on the Roulette label.

Professional ratings
Review scores
Source	Rating
Allmusic	2/5 stars

== Track listing ==
1. "Moon Man" (Henry Glover, Morris Levy) – 2:15
2. "My Coloring Book" (Fred Ebb, John Kander) – 3:10
3. "Did I Remember" (Walter Donaldson, Harold Adamson) 1:54
4. "I Had a Man" (Mark Barkan, Don Christopher) – 4:25
5. "Swinging Shepherd Blues" (Kenny Jacobson, Moe Koffman, Rhoda Roberts) – 2:13
6. "I Was Telling Him About You" (Morris Charlap, Don George) – 2:30
7. "Lonely Crowd" (Glover, Levy) – 2:35
8. "Well A'lright O.K. You Win" (Mayme Watts, Sid Wyche) – 2:24
9. "I've Got It Pretty Bad" (Henry Johnson) – 2:27
10. "Wonder Why" (Nicholas Brodszky, Sammy Cahn) – 2:16
11. "Late Late Show" (Murray Berlin, Roy Alfred) – 2:14
12. "Tess's Torch Song (I Had A Man)" (Harold Arlen, Ted Koehler) – 3:17

== Personnel ==
- Etta Jones – vocals
- Junior Mance – piano
- Kenny Burrell – guitar
- Frank Wess – tenor saxophone, flute
- Joe Newman – trumpet
- Milt Hinton – bass
- Mike Mainieri – vibraphone
- Aliner Jackson – drums
- George Berg – baritone saxophone
