= Basics (Houston Person album) =

Studio album by Houston Person
- Released: 1989
- Recorded: October 12, 1987
- Studio: Van Gelder Studio, Englewood Cliffs, NJ
- Genre: Jazz
- Length: 52:46
- Label: Muse; MR 5344
- Producer: Houston Person

Houston Person chronology
| The Talk of the Town (1987) | Basics (1989) | Something in Common (1989) |

Basics is an album by saxophonist Houston Person recorded in 1987 and released on the Muse label in 1989.

== Reception ==
Professional ratings
Review scores
| Source | Rating |
|---|---|
| Allmusic | 4/5 stars |

Allmusic reviewer Scott Yanow noted "Tenor saxophonist Houston Person has stuck to his singular musical path throughout his career, playing uncomplicated but soulful and swinging renditions of blues, ballads, and jazz standards for a couple decades, ignoring current (and usually short-lived) musical trends. ... the songs sound brand new and almost as if they were written for him. Recommended".

== Track listing ==
1. "What a Diff'rence a Day Made" (María Grever, Stanley Adams) − 7:29
2. "Stormy Weather" (Harold Arlen, Ted Koehler) − 8:49
3. "St. Thomas" (Sonny Rollins) − 5:38
4. "Some Other Spring" (Arthur Herzog Jr., Irene Kitchings) − 7:51
5. "Time After Time" (Jule Styne, Sammy Cahn) − 7:34
6. "Sweet Slumber" (Lucky Millinder, Al J. Neiburg, Henri Woode) − 8:00
7. "Triste" (Antônio Carlos Jobim) − 8:36

== Personnel ==
- Houston Person − tenor saxophone
- Stan Hope − piano
- Peter Martin Weiss − bass
- Cecil Brooks III − drums
- Ralph Dorsey − congas, percussion
