= Detour Ahead (album) =

Studio album by Randy Johnston
- Released: April 3, 2001
- Recorded: January 19, 1998
- Studio: Van Gelder Studio, Englewood Cliffs, NJ
- Genre: Jazz
- Length: 55:17
- Label: HighNote; HCD 7027
- Producer: Houston Person

Randy Johnston chronology
Homage (2000)	Detour Ahead (2001)	Hit & Run (1994)

Detour Ahead is an album by guitarist Randy Johnston which was recorded in 1998 and released on the HighNote label in 2001.

== Reception ==
Professional ratings
Review scores
Source	Rating
AllMusic	3/5 stars
The Penguin Guide to Jazz Recordings	3.5/4 stars

The AllMusic review by Alex Henderson stated "Detour Ahead is a solid album that Johnston should be proud to have in his catalog". In JazzTimes, Jim Ferguson wrote: "when Johnson plays, he leaves you with the feeling that he’s not just connecting the dots, but also really playing, listening and taking chances. It all adds up to another fine performance from a guitarist who’s going to be around for a long time".

== Track listing ==
All compositions by Randy Johnston except where noted

1. "Blues for Edward G." – 9:19
2. "The Triangle Pose" – 6:58
3. "A House Is Not a Home" (Burt Bacharach, Hal David) – 7:24
4. "The End of a Love Affair" (Edward Redding) – 7:43
5. "(They Long to Be) Close to You" (Bacharach, David) – 5:59
6. "Two Step Snake" – 6:39
7. "Detour Ahead" (Herb Ellis, John Frigo, Lou Carter) – 5:46
8. "Dearly Beloved" (Jerome Kern, Johnny Mercer) – 5:29

== Personnel ==
- Randy Johnston – guitar
- David "Fathead" Newman (tracks 1, 2, 5 & 6), Houston Person (track 1) – tenor saxophone
- Joey DeFrancesco – organ
- Byron Landham – drums
