= Goodness! =

Studio album by Houston Person
- Released: 1969
- Recorded: August 25, 1969
- Studio: Van Gelder Studio, Englewood Cliffs, NJ
- Genre: Jazz
- Length: 37:41
- Label: Prestige; PR 7678
- Producer: Bob Porter

Houston Person chronology
Soul Dance! (1968)	Goodness! (1969)	Truth! (1970)

Goodness! is the sixth album led by saxophonist Houston Person, which was recorded in 1969 and released on the Prestige label.

== Reception ==
Professional ratings
Review scores
Source	Rating
Allmusic	4/5 stars
The Penguin Guide to Jazz Recordings	3/4 stars

Allmusic awarded the album 4 stars, stating: "The music is generally quite commercial and is certainly not recommended to bebop purists, although it has some strong moments. But overall these performances succeed more as background music than as creative jazz".

== Track listing ==
All compositions by Houston Person except as noted

1. "Hey Driver!" (Gloria Coleman) - 5:28
2. "Goodness" - 9:28
3. "Brother H." - 4:36
4. "Hard Times" (Paul Mitchell) - 6:16
5. "Jamilah" (Sonny Phillips) - 5:33
6. "Close Your Eyes" (Chuck Willis) - 6:30

== Personnel ==
- Houston Person - tenor saxophone
- Sonny Phillips - organ
- Billy Butler - guitar
- Bob Bushnell - electric bass
- Frankie Jones - drums
- Buddy Caldwell - congas
