= Person-ified =

Studio album by Houston Person
- Released: March 4, 1997
- Recorded: November 26, 1996
- Studio: Van Gelder Studio, Englewood Cliffs, NJ
- Genre: Jazz
- Length: 54:38
- Label: HighNote; HCD 7004
- Producer: Houston Person

Houston Person chronology
Close Encounters (1996)	Person-ified (1997)	The Opening Round (1997)

Person-ified is an album by saxophonist Houston Person which was recorded in late 1996 and released on the HighNote label the following year.

== Reception ==
Professional ratings
Review scores
Source	Rating
AllMusic	4/5 stars
The Penguin Guide to Jazz Recordings	3/4 stars

In his review on AllMusic, Stewart Mason states "Most of Houston Person's late-'90s albums are interchangeable collections of standards recorded with a small combo (the rhythm section led by either a piano or an organ, depending on Person's whim) and featuring Person's sterling tenor saxophone solos on top of a conservative backing. 1997's Person-ified is one of the string, but it's more interesting than some due to a slightly more adventurous taste in song selection. The track listing still leans heavily toward standards, but this time, Person has reached a bit deeper than usual into the great songbooks, coming up with somewhat less-obvious choices ... His backing combo is fairly anonymous, but never simply dull, and even at that, it means that Person's remarkable, underrated tenor playing is always front and center. Not bad at all"

== Track listing ==
1. "You're My Everything" (Harry Warren, Mort Dixon, Joe Young) – 5:26
2. "I'll Never Stop Loving You" (Nicholas Brodszky, Sammy Cahn) – 6:12
3. "There's a Small Hotel" (Richard Rodgers, Lorenz Hart) – 4:30
4. "Stranger on the Shore" (Acker Bilk) – 6:12
5. "Isn't It Romantic?" (Rogers, Hart) – 4:12
6. "Detour Ahead" (Lou Carter, Herb Ellis, Johnny Frigo) – 5:16
7. "Gentle Rain" (Luiz Bonfá, Matt Dubey) – 6:25
8. "In the Wee Small Hours of the Morning" (David Mann, Bob Hilliard) – 6:05
9. "Blue Jug" (Houston Person) – 7:43
10. "May the Good Lord Bless and Keep You" (Meredith Willson) – 2:37

== Personnel ==
- Houston Person – tenor saxophone
- Richard Wyands – piano
- Ray Drummond – bass
- Kenny Washington – drums
