= Soul Dance! =

Studio album by Houston Person
- Released: 1969
- Recorded: November 18, 1968
- Studio: Van Gelder Studio, Englewood Cliffs, NJ
- Genre: Jazz
- Length: 41:43
- Label: Prestige; PR 7621
- Producer: Bob Porter

Houston Person chronology
Blue Odyssey (1968)	Soul Dance! (1969)	Goodness! (1969)

Soul Dance! is the fifth album led by saxophonist Houston Person, which was recorded in 1968 and released on the Prestige label.

== Reception ==
Professional ratings
Review scores
Source	Rating
Allmusic	3/5 stars

Allmusic awarded the album 3 stars, stating: "Although not as well produced or engineered as his '70s and '80s Muse recordings, this late '60s date is vintage Houston Person. He's doing the same mix of blues, ballads, and soul jazz cuts as always, although with a little less confidence, edge, and control than he displays on later albums".

== Track listing ==
All compositions by Houston Person except where noted

1. "Snake Eyes" - 5:22
2. "Never Let Me Go" (Ray Evans, Jay Livingston) - 4:55
3. "Groovin' and A-Groovin'" - 5:04
4. "What a Diff'rence a Day Made" (Stanley Adams, María Grever) - 5:57
5. "Soul Dance" - 3:58
6. "Here's That Rainy Day" (Johnny Burke, Jimmy Van Heusen) - 6:03
7. "Teardrops from My Eyes" (Rudy Toombs) - 4:58
8. "Blue 7" (Sonny Rollins) - 5:26

== Personnel ==
- Houston Person - tenor saxophone
- Billy Gardner - organ
- Joe Jones - guitar
- Frankie Jones - drums
