= Something Personal (Houston Person album) =

Studio album by Houston Person
- Released: October 23, 2015
- Recorded: 2015
- Studio: Van Gelder Studio, Englewood Cliffs, NJ
- Genre: Jazz
- Length: 62:53
- Label: HighNote; HCD 7282
- Producer: Houston Person

Houston Person chronology
| The Melody Lingers On (2014) | Something Personal (2015) | Chemistry (2015) |

Something Personal is an album by saxophonist Houston Person which was recorded in 2015 and released on the HighNote label.

== Reception ==
In JazzTimes, Owen Cordle wrote: "Something Personal is a typical offering from veteran tenor saxophonist Houston Person: warm ballads, an R&B cooker, a couple of standards with a bossa-nova beat and a couple of soulful swingers. ... All around, this is another good one from the ever-dependable Person".

== Track listing ==
1. "The Second Time Around" (Jimmy Van Heusen, Sammy Cahn) – 7:40
2. "Crazy He Calls Me" (Carl Sigman, Bob Russell) – 5:01
3. "I'm Afraid the Masquerade Is Over" (Herb Magidson, Allie Wrubel) – 5:11
4. "The Way We Were" (Marvin Hamlisch, Alan Bergman, Marilyn Bergman) – 7:45
5. "Guilty" (Barry Gibb, Robin Gibb, Maurice Gibb) – 7:03
6. "Change Partners" (Irving Berlin) – 6:00
7. "Teardrops from My Eyes" (Rudy Toombs) – 5:51
8. "Something Personal" (Houston Person) – 4:50
9. "On the Sunny Side of the Street" (Jimmy McHugh, Dorothy Fields) – 4:00
10. "I Remember Clifford" (Benny Golson) – 9:55

== Personnel ==
- Houston Person – tenor saxophone
- John Di Martino – piano
- Steve Nelson – vibraphone
- James Chirillo – guitar (tracks 2 & 4–6)
- Ray Drummond – bass
- Lewis Nash – drums
