= My Buddy: Etta Jones Sings the Songs of Buddy Johnson =

Studio album by Etta Jones
- Released: May 19, 1998
- Recorded: December 11, 1997
- Studio: M & I Recording Studios, NYC
- Genre: Jazz
- Length: 51:48
- Label: HighNote; HCD 7026
- Producer: Houston Person

Etta Jones chronology
The Melody Lingers On (1997)	My Buddy: Etta Jones Sings the Songs of Buddy Johnson (1998)	All the Way (1999)

My Buddy: Etta Jones Sings the Songs of Buddy Johnson is an album by vocalist Etta Jones featuring songs written by Buddy Johnson which was recorded in late 1997 and released on the HighNote label the following year.

== Reception ==
Professional ratings
Review scores
Source	Rating
Allmusic	4.5/5 stars

In his review on Allmusic, Michael G. Nastos states "On My Buddy: Songs of Buddy Johnson, Etta Jones pays tribute to the man who got her started back in 1944. She sings songs originally done by Ella Johnson (Buddy's sister, whom she subbed for) and Arthur Prysock, in her typical soulful, clear, sweet, high-pitched voice".

== Track listing ==
All compositions by Buddy Johnson

1. "When My Man Comes Home" – 4:38
2. "They All Say I'm the Biggest Fool" – 5:36
3. "Save Your Love for Me" – 5:49
4. "Let's Beat Out Some Love" – 4:08
5. "Since I Fell for You" – 5:57
6. "Baby I'm Yours" – 5:31
7. "Fine Brown Frame" – 3:47
8. "(I Wonder) Where Our Love Has Gone" – 4:59
9. "Please Mr. Johnson" – 5:55
10. "Hittin' on Me" – 5:28

== Personnel ==
- Etta Jones – vocals
- Houston Person – tenor saxophone
- Norman Simmons – piano
- John Webber – bass
- Kenny Washington – drums
