= Don't Go to Strangers =

Studio album by Etta Jones
- Released: 1960
- Recorded: June 21, 1960
- Studio: Van Gelder Studio, Englewood Cliffs, NJ
- Genre: Jazz
- Length: 40:55
- Label: Prestige
- Producer: Rudy Van Gelder

Etta Jones chronology
Etta Jones and Strings (1960)	Don't Go to Strangers (1960)	Something Nice (1960)

Professional ratings
Review scores
Source	Rating
AllMusic	4.5/5 stars
The Penguin Guide to Jazz Recordings	3.5/4 stars
DownBeat	4/5 stars

Don't Go to Strangers is an album recorded in 1960 by jazz vocalist Etta Jones. It was inducted in the Grammy Hall of Fame in 2008.

== Overview ==
This was Etta Jones' first album for the independent jazz label Prestige when it was released in 1960 (having been recorded in a single session on June 21 of that year), and although Jones had been releasing records since 1944, including a dozen sides for RCA in 1946 and an album for King Records in 1957, she was treated as an overnight sensation when the title tune from the album went gold, hitting the Top 40 on the pop charts and reaching number five on the R&B charts.

== Reception ==
A reviewer of Dusty Groove stated: "Could anyone ever utter a sexier line than "'Don't go to strangers, come to me?' We think not, and it's material like that that makes the album a real killer from Etta Jones – one of her best from the 60s, cut when she was really developing her skills as a vocalist, but still had enough of an edge to be interesting. Backing is by a small group that includes Frank Wess, Roy Haynes, and Richard Wyands – and the album has a relaxed, jazzy quality that easily makes it one of the real standouts in Etta's career!"

Writing for DownBeat, John Tynan commented that Jones possesses a "real jazz approach that many other aspiring 'jazz' singers might well note, [making] listening to her a rewarding experience... Despite the overt similarity to Lady Day (Billie Holiday) in Miss Jones’ style, this vocalist has enough of her own to go on to much success."

== Track listing ==
No.	Title	Lyrics	Music	Length
1.	"Yes Sir, That's My Baby"	Gus Kahn	Walter Donaldson	4:23
2.	"Don't Go to Strangers"	Redd Evans	Arthur Kent, Dave Mann	3:51
3.	"I Love Paris"	Cole Porter	Cole Porter	4:01
4.	"Fine and Mellow"	Billie Holiday	Billie Holiday	5:52
5.	"Where or When"	Lorenz Hart	Richard Rodgers	3:41
6.	"If I Had You"	Jimmy Campbell and Reg Connelly	Ted Shapiro	3:51
7.	"On the Street Where You Live"	Alan Jay Lerner	Frederick Loewe	3:45
8.	"Something to Remember You By"	Howard Dietz	Arthur Schwartz	3:45
9.	"Bye Bye Blackbird"	Mort Dixon	Ray Henderson	3:16
10.	"All the Way"	Sammy Cahn	Jimmy Van Heusen	4:39

== Personnel ==
- Etta Jones – vocals
- Frank Wess — flute, tenor saxophone
- Richard Wyands — piano
- Skeeter Best — guitar
- George Duvivier — bass
- Roy Haynes — drums

Technical

- Esmond Edwards - photography
