= Trust in Me (album) =

Studio album by Houston Person
- Released: 1967
- Recorded: October 13, 1967
- Studio: New York City
- Genre: Jazz
- Length: 38:27
- Label: Prestige; PR 7548
- Producer: Don Schlitten

Houston Person chronology
Chocomotive (1967)	Trust in Me (1967)	Blue Odyssey (1968)

Trust in Me is the third album led by saxophonist Houston Person which was recorded in 1967 and released on the Prestige label.

== Reception ==
Professional ratings
Review scores
Source	Rating
Allmusic	3/5 stars
The Penguin Guide to Jazz Recordings	3/4 stars

Allmusic awarded the album 3 stars, stating: "Houston Person is generally considered a soul-jazz specialist whose tenor playing can be counted on to elevate a standard organ combo or groove-based session into something memorable. This set, however, demonstrates Person's reach well beyond funk and blues grooves."

== Track listing ==
1. "One Mint Julep" (Rudy Toombs) - 5:27
2. "Trust in Me" (Milton Ager, Arthur Schwartz, Ned Wever) - 4:57
3. "Hey There" (Richard Adler, Jerry Ross) - 5:11
4. "My Little Suede Shoes" (Charlie Parker) - 4:24
5. "That Old Black Magic" (Harold Arlen, Johnny Mercer) - 6:09
6. "Sometimes I Feel Like a Motherless Child" (Traditional) - 6:31
7. "The Second Time Around" (Sammy Cahn, Jimmy Van Heusen) - 5:49

== Personnel ==
- Houston Person - tenor saxophone
- Cedar Walton - piano
- Paul Chambers - bass
- Lenny McBrowne - drums
- Ralph Dorsey - congas
