= I'll Be Seeing You (Etta Jones album) =

Studio album by Etta Jones
- Released: 1988
- Recorded: September 23, 1987
- Studio: Van Gelder Studio, Englewood Cliffs, NJ
- Genre: Jazz
- Length: 35:57
- Label: Muse; MR 5351
- Producer: Houston Person

Etta Jones chronology
Fine and Mellow (1986)	I'll Be Seeing You (1988)	Sugar (1990)

I'll Be Seeing You is an album by vocalist Etta Jones which was recorded in 1976 and released on the Muse label.

== Reception ==
Professional ratings
Review scores
Source	Rating
AllMusic	4.5/5 stars

The AllMusic review by Scott Yanow stated "A straightforward and jazz-influenced singer, Etta Jones' series of recordings for the Muse label were among the finest of her career. On this date, as usual, she is joined by her husband, the great soul-jazz tenor saxophonist Houston Person, along with a rhythm section".

== Track listing ==
1. "Laughing at Life" (Nick A. Kenny, Bob Todd) – 3:53
2. "I Realize Now" (Stanley Cowen, Taps Miller) – 4:30
3. "I Think I'll Tell Him" (Thom Bell, Linda Creed) – 4:50
4. "Jim" (James Petrillo, Milton Samuels, Nelson Shawn) – 5:03
5. "Crazy He Calls Me" (Carl Sigman, Bob Russell) – 4:53
6. "Why Was I Born?" (Jerome Kern, Oscar Hammerstein II) – 3:22
7. "Etta's Blues" (Etta Jones) – 4:55
8. "I'll Be Seeing You" (Sammy Fain, Irving Kahal) – 4:31

== Personnel ==
- Etta Jones – vocals
- Houston Person – tenor saxophone
- George Devens – vibraphone
- Stan Hope – piano
- Milt Hinton – bass
- Vernel Fournier – drums
- Ralph Dorsey – percussion
