= The Melody Lingers On (Etta Jones album) =

Studio album by Etta Jones
- Released: March 4, 1997
- Recorded: November 26, 1996
- Studio: M & I Recording Studios, NYC
- Genre: Jazz
- Length: 48:57
- Label: HighNote; HCD 7005
- Producer: Houston Person

Etta Jones chronology
| At Last (1995) | The Melody Lingers On (1997) | My Buddy: Etta Jones Sings the Songs of Buddy Johnson (1998) |

The Melody Lingers On is an album by vocalist Etta Jones featuring tributes to jazz vocalists, which was recorded in late 1996 and released on the HighNote label the following year.

== Reception ==
Professional ratings
Review scores
| Source | Rating |
|---|---|
| Allmusic | 4/5 stars |
| The Penguin Guide to Jazz Recordings | 3/4 stars |

In his review on Allmusic, Scott Yanow states: "On The Melody Lingers On, Etta Jones pays tribute to ten departed members of show business, with one song apiece saluting Phyllis Hyman, Ella Fitzgerald, Nat King Cole, Louis Armstrong, Dinah Washington, Billie Holiday, Sammy Davis Jr, Billy Eckstine, Alberta Hunter and Sarah Vaughan. The singer does not attempt to emulate any of these greats, and instead sings in her own soulful bluesy style. ... Fine music."

== Track listing ==
1. "Somewhere in My Lifetime" (Jesus Alvarez) – 5:53
2. "A-Tisket, A-Tasket" (Al Feldman, Ella Fitzgerald) – 4:30
3. "For Sentimental Reasons" (William Best, Ivory Watson) – 4:32
4. "What a Wonderful World" (George Douglas, George David Weiss) – 5:06
5. "What a Diff'rence a Day Makes" (María Grever, Stanley Adams) – 4:41
6. "I Cover the Waterfront" (Johnny Green, Edward Heyman) – 4:15
7. "Mr. Bojangles" (Jerry Jeff Walker) – 5:43
8. "I Apologize" (Al Hoffman, Al Goodhart, Ed Nelson) – 4:45
9. "I'm Having a Good Time" (Alberta Hunter) – 4:50
10. "Misty" (Erroll Garner, Johnny Burke) – 4:42

== Personnel ==
- Etta Jones – vocals
- Houston Person – tenor saxophone
- Tom Aalfs – violin
- Dick Morgan – piano
- Keter Betts – bass
- Frankie Jones – drums
