= The Melody Lingers On (Houston Person album) =

Studio album by Houston Person
- Released: October 21, 2014
- Recorded: June 30, 2014
- Studio: Van Gelder Studio, Englewood Cliffs, NJ
- Genre: Jazz
- Length: 56:55
- Label: HighNote; HCD 7269
- Producer: Houston Person

Houston Person chronology
Nice 'n' Easy (2013)	The Melody Lingers On (2014)	Something Personal (2015)

The Melody Lingers On is an album by tenor saxophonist Houston Person which was recorded in 2014 and released on the HighNote label.

== Reception ==
Professional ratings
Review scores
Source	Rating
Allmusic	3.5/5 stars

In his review on Allmusic, Matt Collar states "A journeyman artist with a bent toward swinging soul-jazz, Person has developed into something of an American treasure over the past 30 years. Since the '90s, Person has released a steady stream of standards albums, heavy on lyrical and blues-based songs that perfectly exploit his distinctive, burnished tenor drawl. The Melody Lingers On is no exception, featuring a set of songs heavily weighted toward an intimate, afterglow vibe centered on the warm sound of Person's saxophone. ... At 79 years young, with The Melody Lingers On Person continues his reign as one of the titans of the lush jazz tenor sound". In JazzTimes, Mike Joyce wrote "Here’s veteran reedman Houston Person rolling in the deep again, his tone resonant as ever, his primary focus the Great American Songbook and its enduring lyricism. Unmistakably in his element, relaxed and yet fully engaged".

== Track listing ==
1. "My Funny Valentine" (Richard Rodgers, Lorenz Hart) – 6:24
2. "Gone Again" (Curtis Lewis, Gladys Hampton, Curley Hamner) – 4:42 Amazon
3. "You're Nearer (Rogers, Hart) – 4:31
4. "Minton's" (Danny Mixon, Antoinette Montague) – 4:35
5. "Bewitched" (Rogers, Hart) – 6:00
6. "Only Trust Your Heart" (Benny Carter, Sammy Cahn) – 7:20
7. "They All Laughed" (George Gershwin, Ira Gershwin) – 4:39
8. "Try a Little Tenderness" (Jimmy Campbell, Reg Connelly, Harry M. Woods) – 5:47
9. "The Song Is Ended" (Irving Berlin) – 5:14
10. "You Can't Lose with the Blues" (Lafayette Harris) – 7:43

== Personnel ==
- Houston Person – tenor saxophone
- Lafayette Harris – piano
- Steve Nelson – vibraphone
- Ray Drummond – bass
- Lewis Nash – drums
