= Etta Jones =

American jazz singer (1928–2001)

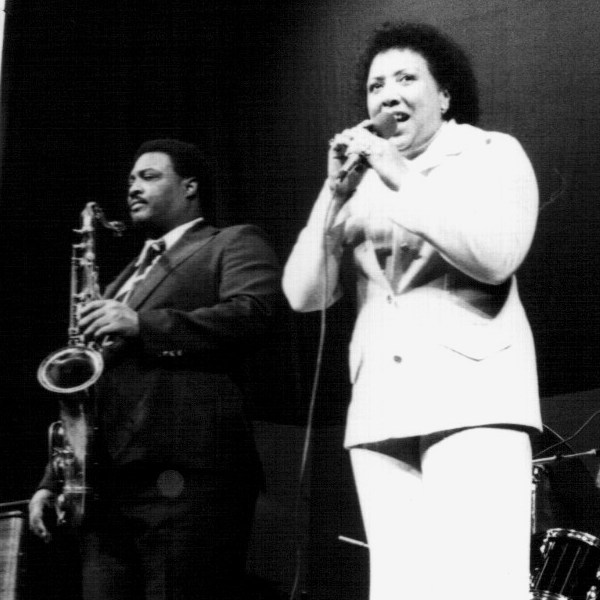
- Jones and Houston Person, 1980

Background information
- Born: November 25, 1928; Aiken, South Carolina, U.S.
- Died: October 16, 2001 (aged 72) Mount Vernon, New York, U.S.
- Genres: Jazz; pop; R&B
- Occupations: Singer; songwriter
- Instrument: Vocals
- Years active: 1943–2001
- Labels: Prestige, Muse, HighNote

Etta Jones (November 25, 1928 – October 16, 2001) was an American jazz singer. Her best-known recordings are "Don't Go to Strangers" and "Save Your Love for Me". She worked with Buddy Johnson, Oliver Nelson, Earl Hines, Barney Bigard, Gene Ammons, Kenny Burrell, Milt Jackson, Cedar Walton, and Houston Person.

== Biography ==
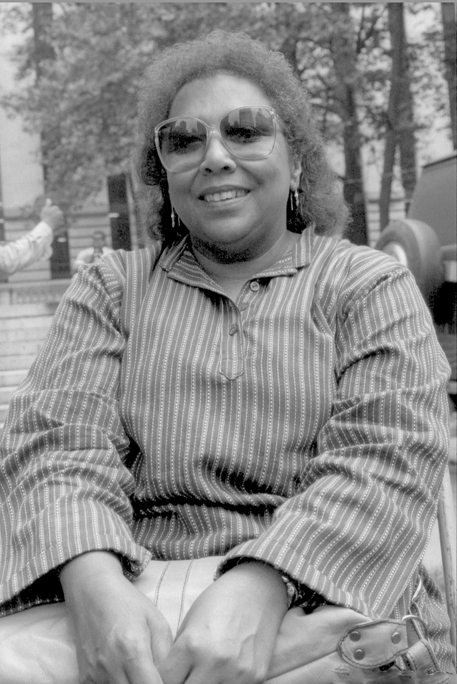
Jones in Bryant Park, New York City, 1984

=== Early life ===
Jones was born in Aiken, South Carolina, where her parents named her after another Etta Jones, a member of the Dandridge Sisters. She was raised in Harlem, New York, where she began performing as a teenager. After she impressed Buddy Johnson at an amateur night at the Apollo Theater in Harlem, he invited her to join his band as a vocalist while his sister, Ella Johnson, was on maternity leave. Still in her teens, Jones joined the band for a tour, although she was not featured on record. Her first recordings—"Salty Papa Blues", "Evil Gal Blues", "Blow Top Blues", and "Long, Long Journey"—were produced by Leonard Feather in 1944, placing her in the company of clarinetist Barney Bigard and tenor saxophonist Georgie Auld.

=== Recording career ===
In 1947, she recorded and released an early cover version of Leon René's "I Sold My Heart to the Junkman" (previously released by the Basin Street Boys on Rene's Exclusive label) while at RCA Victor Records. She performed with the Earl Hines sextet from 1949 to 1952.

During the 1950s, Jones sought to obtain a recording contract, while working as a seamstress, elevator operator, and album stuffer. In 1956, she released the album The Jones Girl...Etta...Sings, Sings, Sings. She obtained a contract in 1960 with Prestige Records after impressing Prestige's preparatory director, Esmond Edwards, with her singing's warmth and phrasing via an unsolicited demo tape. Jones's first single, "Don't Go to Strangers", hit number five on the Rhythm and Blues chart, and 36 in pop charts, at a time when pop charts were dominated by white men. Over the next three years, she recorded ten albums for Prestige. Her favorite songwriter to cover was Sammy Cahn, and she also favored Harold Arlen, George and Ira Gershwin, and Cole Porter.

=== Partnership with Houston Person ===
Following these recordings, on which Jones was featured with high-profile arrangers such as Oliver Nelson and jazz stars such as Frank Wess, Roy Haynes, and Gene Ammons, she had a musical partnership of more than 30 years with tenor saxophonist Houston Person, who received equal billing with her. He also produced her albums and served as her manager after the pair met in one of Johnny "Hammond" Smith's bands.

Although Etta Jones is likely to be remembered above all for her recordings on Prestige, she had a very productive musical career in the last two decades of her life. She had a close professional relationship with Person (frequently, but mistakenly, identified as Jones's husband), and they performed together for decades. Starting in 1976, they began recording for Muse, which later changed its name to HighNote. Person became her manager, as well as her record producer and accompanist, in a partnership that lasted until her death in 2001. They performed up to 200 times a year until she had to stop due to her health. Jones had dealt with cancer for more than a decade until the time of her death and had had a mastectomy and chemotherapy.

=== Legacy and death ===
Only one of her recordings—her debut album for Prestige Records (Don't Go to Strangers, 1960)—enjoyed commercial success with sales of more than 1 million copies. However, her remaining seven albums for Prestige, and beginning in 1976, her recordings for Muse Records, and for HighNote Records secured her a devoted following. She had three Grammy nominations: for the Don't Go to Strangers album in 1960, the Save Your Love for Me album in 1981, and My Buddy (dedicated to her first employer, Buddy Johnson) in 1998. In 2008, the album Don't Go to Strangers was inducted into the Grammy Hall of Fame. In 1996, she recorded the jazz vocalist tribute album, The Melody Lingers On, for the HighNote label. Her last recording, a tribute to Billie Holiday, was released on the day of Jones's death.

Jones married John Medlock, from Washington State. She died in Mount Vernon, New York, at the age of 72, from cancer. Pearson arranged her funeral at one of their frequent performance venues, a church in Mount Vernon, New York. Various jazz musicians played tribute to Jones at the funeral.

Jones earned the Eubie Blake Jazz Award and a Lifetime Achievement Award from the International Women in Jazz Foundation.

== Discography ==
- The Jones Girl...Etta...Sings, Sings, Sings (King, 1958)
- Don't Go to Strangers (Prestige, 1960)
- Something Nice (Prestige, 1961)
- So Warm: Etta Jones and Strings (Prestige, 1961)
- From the Heart (Prestige, 1962)
- Lonely and Blue (Prestige, 1962)
- Love Shout (Prestige, 1963)
- Hollar! (Prestige, 1963)
- Soul Summit Vol. 2 (Prestige, 1963)
- Jonah Jones Swings, Etta Jones Sings (Crown, 1964)
- Etta Jones Sings (Roulette, 1965)
- Etta Jones '75 (20th Century/Westbound 1975)
- Ms. Jones to You (Muse, 1976)
- My Mother's Eyes (Muse, 1978)
- If You Could See Me Now (Muse, 1979)
- Save Your Love for Me (Muse, 1981)
- Love Me with All Your Heart (Muse, 1984)
- Fine and Mellow (Muse, 1987)
- I'll Be Seeing You (Muse, 1988)
- Sugar (Muse, 1990)
- Christmas with Etta Jones (Muse, 1990)
- Reverse the Charges (Muse, 1992)
- At Last (Muse, 1995)
- My Gentleman Friend (Muse, 1996)
- The Melody Lingers On (HighNote, 1996)
- My Buddy: Etta Jones Sings the Songs of Buddy Johnson (HighNote, 1997)
- Some of My Best Friends Are...Singers with Ray Brown (Telarc, 1998)
- All the Way (HighNote, 1999)
- Together at Christmas (HighNote, 2000)
- Easy Living (HighNote, 2000)
- Etta Jones Sings Lady Day (HighNote, 2001)
- Don't Misunderstand: Live in New York with Houston Person (HighNote, 2007)
- The Way We Were: Live in Concert with Houston Person (HighNote, 2011)

=== Guest appearances ===
With Houston Person

- The Real Thing (Eastbound, 1973)
- The Lion and His Pride (Muse, 1994)
- Christmas with Houston Person and Friends (Muse, 1994)
- Together at Christmas (HighNote Records, 2000)
