= Houston Person =

American jazz saxophonist (born 1934)

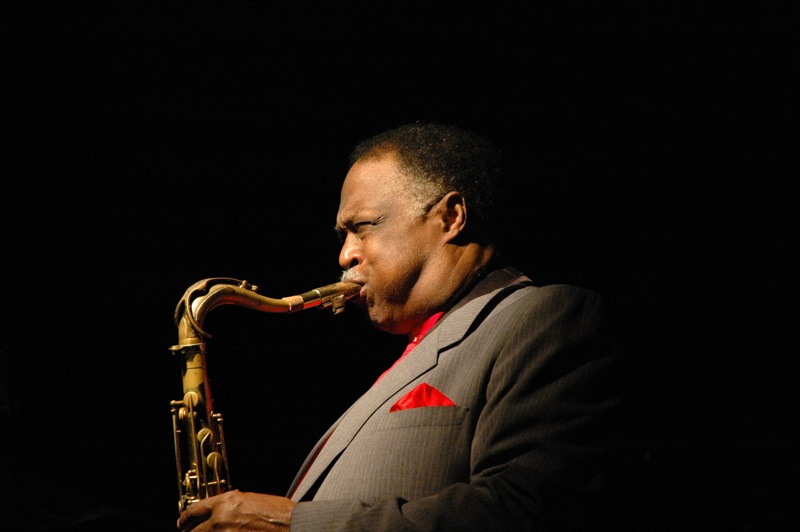
- Person performing at the Cellar in 2006

Background information
- Born: November 10, 1934 (age 92); Florence, South Carolina, U.S.
- Genres: Jazz, soul jazz, swing
- Occupations: Musician, songwriter, bandleader, producer
- Instrument: Saxophone
- Labels: Prestige, Westbound, Mercury, Savoy, Muse, HighNote, Telarc

Houston Person (born November 10, 1934) is an American jazz tenor saxophonist and record producer. Although he has performed in the hard bop and swing genres, he is most experienced in and best known for his work in soul jazz. He received the "Eubie Blake Jazz Award" in 1982.

== Biography ==
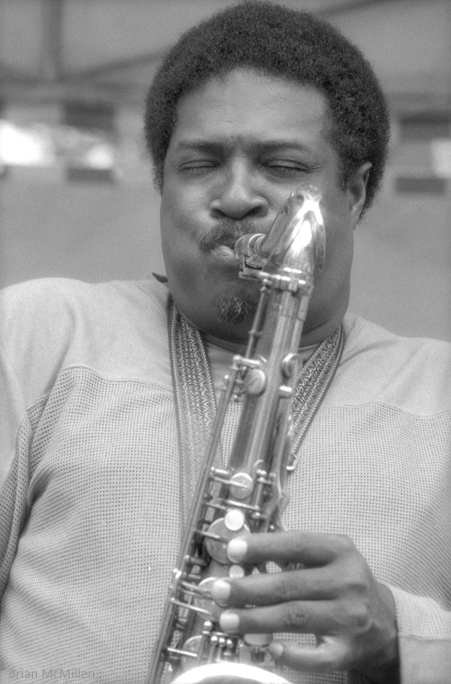
Person in New York, 1984

Person grew up in Florence, South Carolina, and first played piano, before switching to tenor saxophone. He studied at South Carolina State College, where he was inducted into the school's Hall of Fame in 1999.

In the United States Air Force, he joined a service band stationed in West Germany, and played with Don Ellis, Eddie Harris, Cedar Walton, and Leo Wright. Person later continued his studies at Hartt College of Music in Hartford, Connecticut.

He first became known for a series of albums for Prestige in the 1960s. Contrary to popular belief, he was never married to the vocalist Etta Jones, but did spend many years as her musical partner, recording, performing and touring, and for much of his career this association was what he was best known for. They first met playing in organist Johnny Hammond's band.

There are more than 75 albums recorded by Person as a bandleader, on Prestige, Westbound, Mercury, Savoy, and Muse, and he has most recently been recording on HighNote. He has recorded with Charles Brown, Ron Carter, Bill Charlap, Charles Earland, Lena Horne, Etta Jones, Lou Rawls, Janis Siegel, Horace Silver, Dakota Staton, Cedar Walton, plus Billy Butler, Don Patterson, Grant Green, Sonny Phillips, Johnny "Hammond" Smith, Richard "Groove" Holmes and others.

Person has been a resident of Newark, New Jersey.

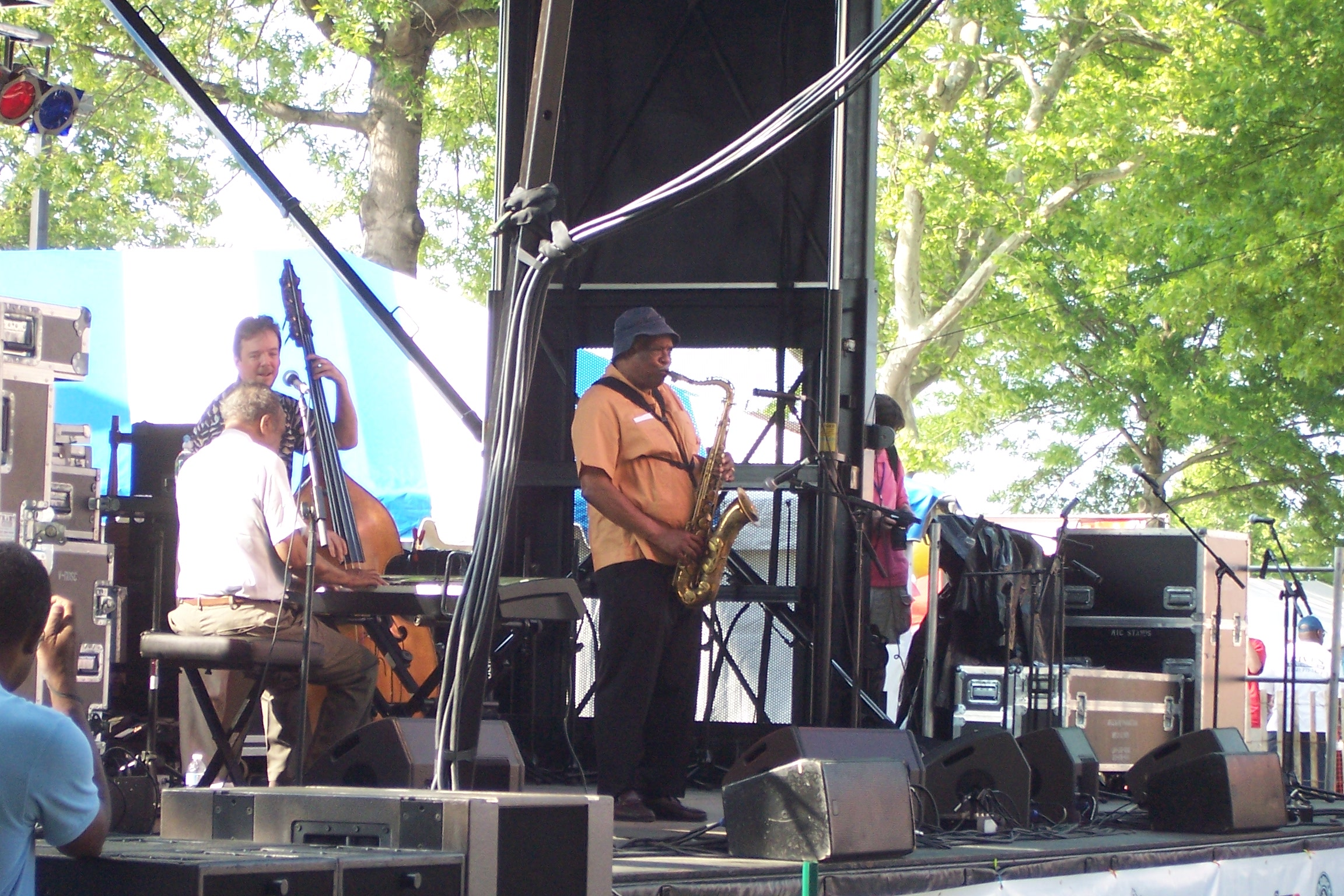
Person performing with his combo at the Red Bank Jazz & Blues Festival in 2009.

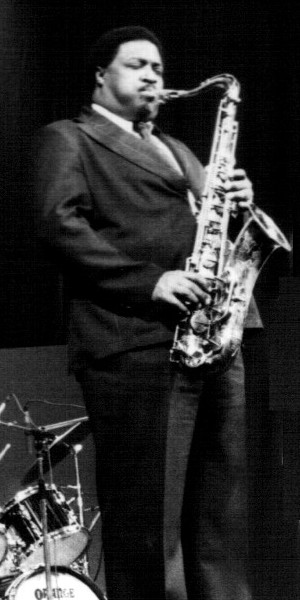
Person in Paris, France, in 1980

== Awards ==
Person received the Eubie Blake Jazz Award in 1982, and in 2011 the Jazz Legend Award, presented in San Diego.

== Discography ==
=== As leader ===
- Underground Soul! (Prestige, 1966)
- Chocomotive (Prestige, 1967)
- Trust in Me (Prestige, 1967)
- Blue Odyssey (Prestige, 1968)
- Soul Dance! (Prestige, 1968)
- Goodness! (Prestige, 1969)
- Truth! (Prestige, 1970)
- Person to Person! (Prestige, 1970)
- Houston Express (Prestige, 1971)
- Broken Windows, Empty Hallways (Prestige, 1972)
- Sweet Buns & Barbeque (Prestige, 1972)
- Island Episode (Prestige, 1971/1973 [1997])
- The Real Thing [live] (Eastbound, 1973) - 2LP
- Houston Person '75 (Westbound/20th Century, 1975)
- Get Out'a My Way! (Westbound/20th Century, 1975)
- Pure Pleasure (Mercury, 1976)
- Harmony (Mercury, 1977)
- Stolen Sweets (Muse, 1976 [1977])
- Wild Flower (Muse, 1977 [1978])
- The Nearness of You (Muse, 1977 [1978])
- The Gospel Soul of Houston Person (Savoy, 1978)
- The Big Horn (Muse, 1976 [1979])
- Suspicions (Muse, 1980)
- Very PERSONal (Muse, 1980 [1981])
- Heavy Juice (Muse, 1982)
- Road Warriors (Greene Street, 1984) - with Les McCann
- Creation (Greene Street, 1984) - with Roger Kellaway
- Always on My Mind (Muse, 1985)
- The Talk of the Town (Muse, 1987)
- We Owe It All to Love (Baseline [UK], 1989)
- Basics (Muse, 1987 [1989])
- Something in Common (Muse, 1989 [1990]) - with Ron Carter
- The Party (Muse, 1989 [1991])
- Now's the Time (Muse, 1990) - with Ron Carter
- Just Friends (Muse, 1990 [1992]) - with Buddy Tate and Nat Simkins
- Why Not! (Muse, 1990)
- The Lion and His Pride (Muse, 1991)
- Christmas with Houston Person and Friends (Muse, 1994) - with Randy Johnston, Etta Jones, Grady Tate, Benny Green [reissued as Santa Baby on Savoy in 2003]
- Horn to Horn (Muse, 1994 [1996]) - with Teddy Edwards
- Close Encounters (HighNote, 1996 [1999]) - with Teddy Edwards
- Person-ified (HighNote, 1996 [1997]) - with Richard Wynands, Ray Drummond, Kenny Washington
- Lost & Found - with Charles Brown (32 Jazz, 1997) [first issue of previously unreleased Muse album Sweet Slumber, recorded in 1991]
- The Opening Round (Savant, 1997)
- Christmas With Houston Person and Etta Jones (32 Jazz, 1997) [compilation of various Muse material]
- My Romance (HighNote, 1998)
- Soft Lights (HighNote, 1999)
- Together at Christmas (HighNote, 2000) - with Etta Jones
- The Way We Were: Live in Concert (HighNote, 2000 [2011]) - with Etta Jones
- In a Sentimental Mood (HighNote, 2000)
- Dialogues (HighNote, 2000 [2002]) - with Ron Carter
- Blue Velvet (HighNote, 2001)
- Sentimental Journey (HighNote, 2002)
- Social Call (HighNote, 2003) - with Paul Bollenback
- To Etta with Love (HighNote, 2004) - with Paul Bollenback
- You Taught My Heart to Sing (HighNote, 2004 [2006]) - with Bill Charlap
- All Soul (HighNote, 2005)
- Just Between Friends (HighNote, 2005 [2008]) - with Ron Carter
- Thinking of You (HighNote, 2007)
- The Art and Soul of Houston Person (HighNote, 2008) - 3CD
- Mellow (HighNote, 2009)
- Moment to Moment (HighNote, 2010)
- So Nice (HighNote, 2011)
- Naturally (HighNote, 2012)
- Nice 'n' Easy (HighNote, 2013)
- The Melody Lingers On (HighNote, 2014) - with Steve Nelson
- Something Personal (HighNote, 2015)
- Chemistry (HighNote, 2015 [2016]) - with Ron Carter
- Rain or Shine (HighNote, 2017)
- Remember Love (HighNote, 2018) - with Ron Carter
- I'm Just a Lucky So and So (HighNote, 2019)
- Live in Paris (HighNote, 2019 [2021])
- Reminiscing at Rudy's (HighNote, 2022)
- From the Heart (Arbor Records, 2026)

=== As sideman ===
With Joe Alterman

- Give Me the Simple Life (Mile High, 2012)
- Brisket for Breakfast (no label, 2025)

With Billy Butler

- This Is Billy Butler! (Prestige, 1968)
- Yesterday, Today & Tomorrow (Prestige, 1970)
- Night Life (Prestige, 1971)

With Joey DeFrancesco

- All About My Girl (Muse, 1994)
- Plays Sinatra His Way (High Note, 1998 [rel. 2004])

With Charles Earland

- Black Talk! (Prestige, 1969)
- Pleasant Afternoon (Muse, 1981)

With Peter Hand Big Band

- The Wizard of Jazz: A Tribute to Harold Arlen (Savant, 2005 [rel. 2009])
- Out of Hand (Savant, 2013)
- Blue Topaz (Whaling City, 2024)

With Richard "Groove" Holmes

- Good Vibrations (Muse, 1977 [rel. 1980])
- Broadway (Muse, 1980)
- Blues All Day Long (Muse, 1988)
- Hot Tat (Muse, 1989 [rel. 1991])

With Etta Jones

- Etta Jones '75 (Westbound/20th Century, 1975)
- Ms. Jones to You (Muse, 1976)
- My Mother's Eyes (Muse, 1977)
- If You Could See Me Now (Muse, 1978)
- Save Your Love for Me (Muse, 1980)
- Fine and Mellow (Muse, 1986)
- I'll Be Seeing You (Muse, 1987)
- Sugar (Muse, 1989)
- Christmas with Etta Jones (Muse, 1990)
- Reverse the Charges (Muse, 1992)
- At Last (Muse, 1995)
- The Melody Lingers On (HighNote, 1997)
- My Buddy: Etta Jones Sings the Songs of Buddy Johnson (HighNote, 1998)
- All the Way (HighNote, 1999)
- Easy Living (HighNote, 2000)
- Etta Jones Sings Lady Day (HighNote, 2001)

With Johnny Lytle

- Fast Hands (Muse, 1980)
- Good Vibes (Muse, 1982)
- Moonchild (Muse, 1992)

With Don Patterson

- Four Dimensions (Prestige, 1967)
- Oh Happy Day (Prestige, 1969)
- Tune Up! (Prestige, 1969)

With Johnny "Hammond" Smith

- Mr. Wonderful (Riverside, 1963)
- A Little Taste (Riverside, 1963)
- The Stinger (Prestige, 1965)
- The Stinger Meets the Golden Thrush (Prestige, 1966) - with Byrdie Green
- Gettin' Up (Prestige, 1967)
- Soul Flowers (Prestige, 1967)
- Dirty Grape (Prestige, 1968)
- Nasty! (Prestige, 1968)
- Here It 'Tis (Prestige, 1970)

With others

- The 3B's, Soothin' 'N Groovin' with The 3B's (3B's Music, 1994)
- Gene Ammons, The Boss Is Back! (Prestige, 1969)
- Charles Brown, Blues and Other Love Songs (Muse, 1992)
- Paul (PB) Brown, Paul Brown Quartet Meets The Three Tenors (Brownstone, 1998)
- Ron Carter, Orfeu (Somethin' Else/Blue Note, 1999)
- Emmet Cohen, Masters Legacy Series Volume 5: Houston Person (La Reserve Records, 2023)
- Grant Green, Live at Club Mozambique (Blue Note, 2006) – rec. 1971
- Tiny Grimes, Profoundly Blue (Muse, 1973)
- Randy Johnston, Detour Ahead (HighNote, 2001) – rec. 1998
- Charles Kynard, Afro-Disiac (Prestige, 1970)
- Sonny Phillips, Sure 'Nuff (Prestige, 1969)
- Jimmy Ponder, Come On Down (Muse, 1991)
- Bernard Purdie, Shaft (Prestige, 1973) – rec. 1971
- Shirley Scott, Oasis (Muse, 1989)
- Rhoda Scott, Feelin' the Groove (Verve, 1993)
- Janis Siegel, Friday Night Special (Telarc, 2003)
- Horace Silver, That Healin' Feelin' (Blue Note, 1970)
- Melvin Sparks, Sparks! (Prestige, 1970)
- Warren Vaché, Horn of Plenty (Muse, 1993)
