= Flat Out (John Scofield album) =

Studio album by John Scofield
- Released: July 14, 1989
- Recorded: December 1988
- Studio: A&R Recording and Gramavision Studios (New York City, New York)
- Genre: Jazz
- Length: 50:59 (CD); 47:19 (vinyl)
- Label: Gramavision
- Producer: Steve Swallow

John Scofield chronology
Pick Hits Live (1987)	Flat Out (1989)	Time on My Hands (1990)

Professional ratings
Review scores
Source	Rating
Allmusic	4/5 stars
The Penguin Guide to Jazz Recordings	3.5/4 stars

Flat Out is a studio album by jazz guitarist John Scofield. It was recorded in December 1988 and was his sixth and last album for Gramavision. It features keyboardist Don Grolnick, bassist Anthony Cox and drummers Johnny Vidacovich and Terri Lyne Carrington.

== Background ==
The album marks a shift from his later funk-oriented fusion recordings to hard swinging tracks with "almost boppish" solos and a new focus on New Orleans rhythm and blues, covering two songs by The Meters and Huey "Piano" Smith and an original ("In the Cracks") with a second line groove.

Scofield had previously worked with the musicians on the album in other contexts. Grolnick (who is the organist on four of the ten tracks) played keyboards on Scofield's 1986 album Still Warm and produced his 1991 album Meant to Be. Anthony Cox played with Scofield on a recording by saxophonist Gary Thomas a few months earlier (By Any Means Necessary). Terri Lyne Carrington and Scofield first played together on a session led by pianist Niels Lan Doky in September 1988 (Daybreak). Johnny Vidacovich "is the quintessential New Orleans jazz drummer." Scofield recorded with him in 1988 for trombonist Ray Anderson's album Blues Bred in the Bone. Scofield and Anderson also recorded together with saxophonist Bennie Wallace on his New Orleans/ R&B influenced albums Twilight Time (1985) and Bordertown (1987), both featuring Dr. John. Scofield returned to New Orleans–based grooves on his 1995 album Groove Elation and most explicitly in 2009 on Piety Street.

== Track listing ==
All tracks are written by John Scofield except where noted.

No.	Title	Writer(s)	Length
1.	"Cissy Strut"	George Porter Jr., Ziggy Modeliste, Art Neville, Leo Nocentelli	2:56
2.	"Secret Love"	Sammy Fain, Paul Francis Webster	5:55
3.	"All the Things You Are"	Oscar Hammerstein, Jerome Kern	7:37
4.	"In the Cracks"		4:48
5.	"Softy"		4:34
6.	"Science and Religion"		4:42
7.	"The Boss's Car"		6:59
8.	"Evansville"		5:52
9.	"Flat Out" (CD only)		3:40
10.	"Rockin' Pneumonia"	Huey "Piano" Smith	3:57
Total length:			50:59

== Personnel ==
- John Scofield – guitars
- Don Grolnick – Hammond B3 organ (1, 4, 6, 10)
- Anthony Cox – double bass
- Johnny Vidacovich – drums (1, 2, 4-6, 9, 10)
- Terri Lyne Carrington – drums (3, 7, 8)

=== Production ===
- Jonathan F. P. Rose – executive producer
- Steve Swallow – producer
- Joe Ferla – recording, mixing
- Angela Gomez – assistant recording
- Tim Casey – mix assistant
- Bob Ludwig – mastering at Masterdisk (New York, New York)
- Beth Yenni – art direction
- Izumi Inoue – design
- Aldo Mauro – photography
