= Dennis Chambers =

American drummer (born 1959)

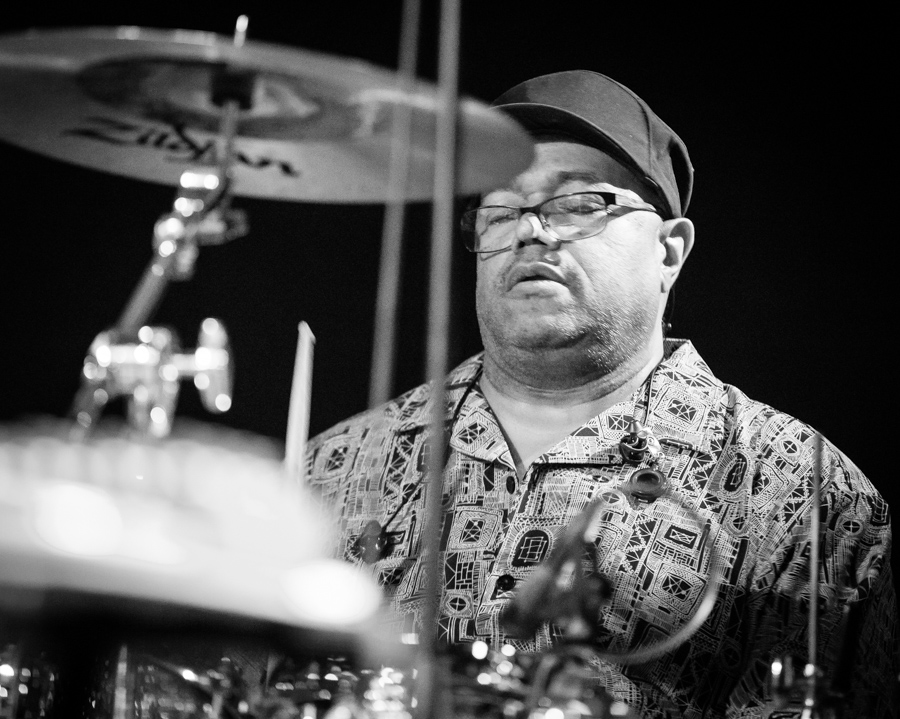

Background information
- Born: Dennis Milton Chambers; May 9, 1959 (age 67); Baltimore, Maryland, U.S.
- Genres: Jazz, jazz fusion, funk, latin rock
- Occupation: Musician
- Instrument: Drums
- Years active: 1978–present
- Label: Sugar Hill
- Formerly of: Parliament-Funkadelic, John Scofield band, CAB, Niacin
- Website: dennischambers.com

Dennis Milton Chambers (born May 9, 1959) is an American jazz fusion and funk drummer. He was inducted into the Modern Drummer Hall of Fame in 2001.

== Early life ==
Chambers was born on May 9, 1959, in Baltimore, Maryland, U.S. He began drumming at the age of four years, and was gigging in Baltimore-area nightclubs by the age of six when the bass player for a local jazz band called The Fingertips overheard his drumming while being stuck in traffic. He was recruited in 1981 by the Sugar Hill Label to be their "house drummer." Chambers played on many Sugar Hill releases. Contrary to popular belief, he did not play on "Rapper's Delight", which was revealed in an interview with Drumeo on August 16, 2017.

In an interview by Bonedo in 2011, Chambers was asked who some of his influences and favorite drummers were and he mentioned Clyde Stubblefield, Al Jackson Jr., Steve Gadd, Vinnie Colaiuta, Gary Husband, Jack Dejohnette, Billy Cobham, Buddy Rich, Elvin Jones, Roy Haynes, and Tony Williams.

== Career ==
In 1978 (at 18 years old), Chambers joined Parliament/Funkadelic, and stayed with them until 1985. In 1986, he joined the John Scofield band. Since then he has played with most of the major figures in jazz fusion music.

He has recorded and performed with Tom Coster, John Scofield, George Duke, Victor Wooten, Brecker Brothers, Santana, Steely Dan, Jeff Berlin, Parliament/Funkadelic, John McLaughlin, Niacin, Mike Stern, CAB, Greg Howe, and many others.

He has toured extensively with Carlos Santana, and is a member of the jazz-rock trio Niacin.

In December 2004, Chambers was awarded an Honorary Doctorate of Music from Berklee College of Music during the inauguration of former president Roger H. Brown. In 2013, Chambers recorded the album Groove and More, produced by Lino Nicolosi and Pino Nicolosi, for the Italian company Nicolosi Productions, published by Soul Trade.

== Equipment ==
Chambers plays and endorses Pearl Drums, pedals, hardware & racks, Zildjian cymbals, drumsticks and general accessories, Latin Percussion, Ddrum electronics and Evans Drumheads.

== Discography ==
Year	Personnel	Title	Label
1982	Don Blackman	Don Blackman	Arista Records
1983	P-Funk All Stars	Live at the Beverly Theater in Hollywood	Westbound
1986	John Scofield	Blue Matter	Gramavision
1987	John Scofield	Loud Jazz	Gramavision
1987	John Scofield	Pick Hits Live	Gramavision
1989	Gary Thomas	By Any Means Necessary	JMT
1990	Bill Evans Group (Bill Evans, Chuck Loeb, Jim Beard, Darryl Jones, Dennis Chambers)	Let the Juice Loose (Live at the Blue Note, Tokyo)	Bellaphon
1990	Gary Thomas	While the Gate Is Open	JMT
1991	Dennis Chambers	Big City	Glass House
1991	Gary Thomas	The Kold Kage	JMT
1992	Carl Filipiak Group (Carl Filipiak, Dennis Chambers, Paul Soroka, Jim Charlsen, Victor Williams, George Gray, Dave Fairall, Rod Daniels)	Right on Time	Geometric
1992	Petite Blonde (Bill Evans, Chuck Loeb, Mitchel Forman, Victor Bailey, Dennis Chambers)	Petite Blonde	Lipstick
1992	Brecker Brothers	Return of the Brecker Brothers	GRP
1992	Barbara Dennerlein	That's Me	Enja Records
1992	Dennis Chambers	Getting Even	Glass House
1993	Tom Coster	Let's Set The Record Straight	JVC Records
1993	Graffiti (Dennis Chambers, Haakon Graf, Gary Grainger, Ulf Wakenius)	Good Groove	ESC
1993	Charles Blenzig, Mike Stern, Will Lee, Alex Foster, Dennis Chambers, Manolo Badrena, Michael Brecker)	Say What You Mean	Big World
1994	Tom Coster	Forbidden Zone	JVC Records
1994	John McLaughlin & the Free Spirits	Tokyo Live	Japan Import
1995	Tom Coster	From The Street	JVC Records
1995	Steely Dan	Alive in America	Giant
1995	Barbara Dennerlein	Take Off	Verve Records
1996	Niacin (band)	Niacin	Stretch Records
1996	Mike Stern	Between The Lines	Atlantic Jazz
1997	John McLaughlin, Gary Thomas	The Heart of Things	Verve/Universum
1997	Niacin (band)	Live	Stretch Records
1997	Barbara Dennerlein	Junkanoo	Verve Records
1998	Niacin (band)	High Bias	Stretch Records
1999	Victor Bailey	Low Blow	ESC
2000	Niacin (band)	Live! Blood, Sweat & Beers	Magna Carta
2000	John McLaughlin	The Heart of Things: Live in Paris	Polygram
2000	CAB	CAB	Tone Center
2001	CAB	CAB 2	Tone Center
2001	Brett Garsed, T. J. Helmerich, Gary Willis, Scott Kinsey	Uncle Moe's Space Ranch	Tone Center
2003	CAB	CAB 4	Tone Center
2002	Dennis Chambers	Outbreak	Esc
2003	Greg Howe, Victor Wooten, Dennis Chambers	Extraction	Tone Center
2003	Biréli Lagrène, Dominique Di Piazza, Dennis Chambers	Front Page	Sunnyside
2004	Nick Smith (Guest Artists: Dennis Chambers, Stanley Clarke, David Sanchez)	It's Like That	Independent release
2005	Dennis Chambers	Planet Earth	BHM
2006	Dennis Chambers, Jeff Berlin, David Fiuczynski, T Lavitz	Boston T Party	Tone Center
2006	True Spirit John Grant, Victor Williams, Dennis Chambers, Najee	True Spirit	Independent release
2007	Carl Filipiak Group	I Got Your Mantra	Art of Life
2007	Maceo Parker WDR Big Band Cologne, Michael Abene conductor, Rodney "Skeet" Curtis (bass)	Roots and Grooves	Heads Up
2007	Brett Garsed, T. J. Helmerich, Gary Willis, Scott Kinsey	Moe's Town (Uncle Moe's Space Ranch)	Tone Center
2008	Paul Hanson	Frolic in the Land of Plenty	Abstract Logix
2009	Dean Brown	DBIII: Live at the Cotton Club Tokyo	BHM
2009	Tony Bunn	Small World	ATP
2010	Greg Howe, Tetsuo Sakurai, Dennis Chambers	Vital World	Abstract Logix
2014	Dennis Chambers	Groove and More	Nicolosi Productions
2017	Victor Wooten	Trypnotyx	Vix Records
2023	Oz Noy	Triple Play	Abstract Logix
2026	Faye Carol	Forever Dynamic	Getdown Records
