= Adventures in Radioland =

Studio album by Mahavishnu
- Released: 1987
- Recorded: January–February 1986
- Studio: Psycho Recording Studios & Sampling (Milan, Italy)
- Genre: Jazz fusion, electronic rock
- Length: 40:57
- Label: Relativity; PolyGram (CD)
- Producer: John McLaughlin

Mahavishnu Orchestra chronology
Mahavishnu (1984)	Adventures in Radioland (1987)	The Lost Trident Sessions (1999)

John McLaughlin chronology
Mahavishnu (1984)	Adventures in Radioland (1987)	Mediterranean Concerto (For Guitar and Orchestra) (1988)

Professional ratings
Review scores
Source	Rating
Allmusic	3/5 stars
The Penguin Guide to Jazz Recordings	2.5/4 stars

Adventures in Radioland is a 1987 album by the John McLaughlin-headed group Mahavishnu, released by the Relativity label which represents McLauglin's interest in electronic technology. It features McLaughlin using the New England Digital Synclavier with NED's proprietary guitar interface.

The album was recorded at Psycho Recording Studios & Sampling in Milan initially by Craigh Milliner then finished by Max Costa and mixed by John McLaughlin and Max Costa. It was released on CD by the Polygram label in 1993.

== Track listing ==
Side one
No.	Title	Music	Length
1.	"The Wait"	Jim Beard	5:35
2.	"Just Ideas"	Mitchel Forman	2:00
3.	"Jozy"	McLaughlin	5:25
4.	"Half Man - Half Cookie"	Bill Evans	2:56
5.	"Florianapolis"	McLaughlin, Forman	5:21

Side two
No.	Title	Music	Length
1.	"Gotta Dance"	McLaughlin	4:18
2.	"The Wall Will Fall"	McLaughlin	6:00
3.	"Reincarnation"	McLaughlin	2:57
4.	"Mitch Match"	Forman	3:54
5.	"20th Century Ltd"	McLaughlin	2:31

== Personnel ==
- John McLaughlin – guitars
- Danny Gottlieb – drums
- Jonas Hellborg – bass guitar
- Bill Evans – saxophones, keyboards (4)
- Mitchel Forman – keyboards
