= Dialogues (Houston Person and Ron Carter album) =

Studio album by Houston Person and Ron Carter
- Released: June 18, 2002
- Recorded: August 18, 2000
- Studios: Van Gelder Studio, Englewood Cliffs, NJ
- Genre: Jazz
- Length: 52:10
- Labels: HighNote; HCD 7072
- Producer: Houston Person

Houston Person chronology
Together at Christmas (2000)	Dialogues (2002)	Blue Velvet (2000)

Ron Carter chronology
When Skies Are Grey... (2000)	Dialogues (2000)	Stardust (2001)

Dialogues is an album by saxophonist Houston Person and bassist Ron Carter recorded in 2000 and released on the HighNote label in 2002.

== Reception ==
Professional ratings
Review scores
Source	Rating
AllMusic	4.5/5 stars
The Penguin Guide to Jazz Recordings	3/4 stars

The AllMusic review by Scott Yanow said "In 2000, Person and Carter recorded their third duet album, and the results are at least as rewarding as their first two collaborations. ... Person and Carter swing hard and sound at their most playful and creative in each other's company. They both sound inspired by this setting (where every sound counts) and play with full confidence; there is not a single hesitant moment. This is a particularly memorable and enjoyable effort that features the two musicians at their best". In JazzTimes, Doug Ramsey stated "Tenor saxophonist Houston Person and bassist Ron Carter are alone together in their tonal roundness and relaxed exposition of rhythm and melody ... Carter solos on every piece, now and then breaking out double stops and other tricks of the bassist’s trade. On “Mack the Knife,” he and Person trade phrases to great effect. But it is when he is playing perfect complementary notes and laying the time down behind Person that Carter is at his best".

== Track listing ==
1. "Doxy" (Sonny Rollins) – 9:24
2. "I Remember Clifford" (Benny Golson) – 7:22
3. "Dear Old Stockholm" (Traditional) – 5:50
4. "Mr. Bow Tie" (Ron Carter) – 6:32
5. "On the Sunny Side of the Street" (Jimmy McHugh, Dorothy Fields) – 6:59
6. "I Fall in Love Too Easily" (Jule Styne, Sammy Cahn) – 5:52
7. "Mack the Knife" (Kurt Weill, Bertolt Brecht) – 4:04
8. "I Got It Bad (And That Ain't Good)" (Duke Ellington, Paul Francis Webster) – 6:07

== Personnel ==
- Houston Person - tenor saxophone
- Ron Carter - bass
