= Till We Have Faces (Gary Thomas album) =

Studio album by Gary Thomas
- Released: 1992
- Recorded: May 8–14, 1992
- Genre: Jazz
- Length: 60:48
- Labels: JMT; JMT 514 000
- Producer: Stefan Winter

Gary Thomas chronology
| The Kold Kage (1991) | Till We Have Faces (1992) | Exile's Gate (1993) |

Till We Have Faces is the sixth album by saxophonist Gary Thomas which was recorded in 1992 and released on the JMT label. As with his previous album While the Gate Is Open (1990), it features Thomas' interpretations of eight jazz standards.

== Reception ==
Professional ratings
Review scores
| Source | Rating |
|---|---|
| AllMusic | 4.5/5 stars |
| The Penguin Guide to Jazz Recordings | 3/4 stars |

The AllMusic review by Thom Jurek states, "This is Thomas' best moment on record thus far, and a casebook example of reinterpreting the jazz genre." The Chicago Tribune's Jack Fuller noted "The combination of Gary Thomas' whirling dervish tenor saxophone and Pat Metheny's guitar makes this an outstanding recording".

== Track listing ==
Side one:
| No. | Title | Length |
|---|---|---|
| 1. | "Angel Eyes" (Earl Brent, Matt Dennis) | 8:12 |
| 2. | "The Best Thing for You" (Irving Berlin) | 8:00 |
| 3. | "Lush Life" (Billy Strayhorn) | 5:30 |
| 4. | "Bye Bye Baby" (Leo Robin, Jule Styne) | 6:41 |

Side two:
| No. | Title | Length |
|---|---|---|
| 5. | "Lament" (J. J. Johnson) | 9:28 |
| 6. | "Peace" (Horace Silver) | 7:19 |
| 7. | "It's You or No One" (Sammy Cahn, Jule Styne) | 6:36 |
| 8. | "You Don't Know What Love Is" (Gene de Paul, Don Raye) | 9:38 |

== Personnel ==
- Gary Thomas – tenor saxophone, soprano saxophone, flute
- Pat Metheny – electric guitar (tracks 1–6 & 8)
- Tim Murphy – piano (tracks 1, 4, 6 & 8)
- Anthony Cox – bass (tracks 1, 5 & 6), Ed Howard (tracks 2, 4, 7 & 8)
- Terri Lyne Carrington – drums (tracks 1, 2 & 4–8)
- Steve Moss – percussion (track 6)
