= Victor Williams (disambiguation) =

Victor Williams (born 1970) is an American actor.

Victor Williams may also refer to:

- Victor Williams (Canadian Army officer) (1867–1949), Canadian general and Commissioner of the Ontario Provincial Police
- Victor Williams, American football player for the 2012 Milwaukee Mustangs season
- Victor Williams, American arena football player for the 2010 Cleveland Gladiators season
- Victor Williams, percussionist on The Heart of Things: Live in Paris
- Vic Williams (born 1963), American politician from Arizona
- Victor Williams (sprinter) (born 1908), American sprinter, 440 yards winner at the 1931 USA Outdoor Track and Field Championships
