= Blue Matter =

Blue Matter may refer to:

- Blue Matter (John Scofield album), 1986
- Blue Matter (Savoy Brown album), 1969
