= The Big Horn =

Studio album by Houston Person
- Released: 1979
- Recorded: May 20, 1976
- Genre: Jazz
- Length: 43:03
- Label: Muse; MR 5136
- Producer: Michael Cuscuna

Houston Person chronology
Stolen Sweets (1976)	The Big Horn (1979)	Pure Pleasure (1976)

The Big Horn is an album by saxophonist Houston Person recorded in 1976 and released on the Muse label in 1979.

== Reception ==
Professional ratings
Review scores
Source	Rating
Allmusic	4/5 stars
DownBeat	4/5 stars

Allmusic awarded the album 4 stars noting that "Reliable soul jazz, nicely played ballads, and good standards are tenor saxophonist Houston Person's forte, and he demonstrates that repeatedly on this '76 quintet set".

== Track listing ==
1. "Bluesology" (Milt Jackson) - 9:55
2. "This Love of Mine" (Sol Parker, Frank Sinatra, Hank Sanicola) - 5:33
3. "Gee, Baby, Ain't I Good to You" (Andy Razaf, Don Redman) - 5:27
4. "The More I See You" (Harry Warren, Mack Gordon) - 6:50
5. "Memories of You" (Andy Razaf, Eubie Blake) - 4:18
6. "I Concentrate on You" (Cole Porter) - 11:00

== Personnel ==
- Houston Person - tenor saxophone
- Cedar Walton - piano
- Buster Williams - bass
- Grady Tate - drums
- Buddy Caldwell - congas
