= Anthony Cox (musician) =

American jazz musician (born 1954)

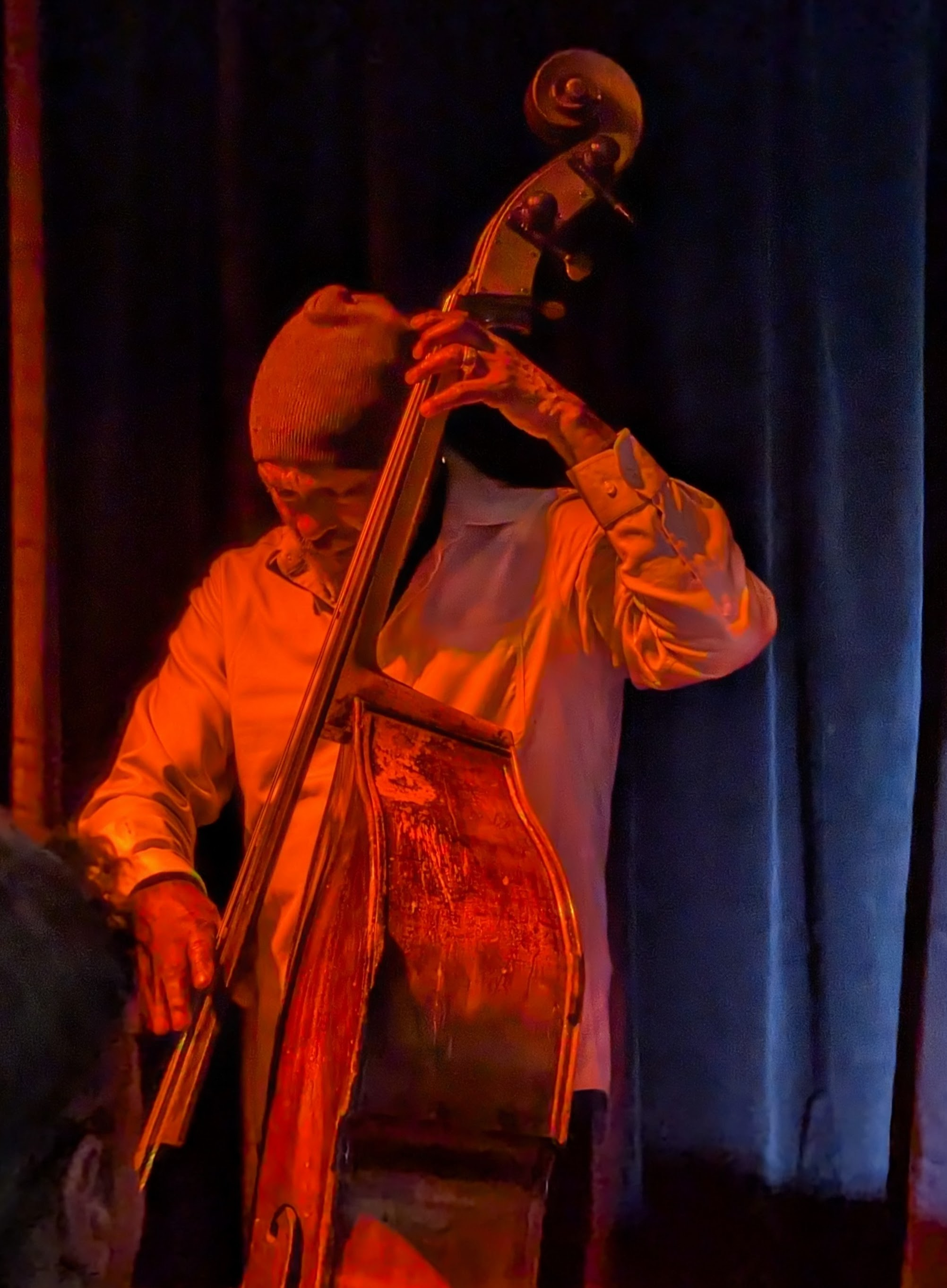
- Anthony Cox at the Icehouse music venue, Minneapolis MN, USA, 2025

Background information
- Born: October 24, 1954 (age 71)
- Origin: Minneapolis, Minnesota, U.S.
- Genres: Jazz
- Instruments: Double bass, bass guitar

Anthony Cox (born October 24, 1954) is an American jazz bass player. He is known for his work with several leading musicians including Geri Allen, Dewey Redman, Dave Douglas, John Scofield, Pat Metheny, Gary Thomas, Marty Ehrlich, Ed Blackwell, Joe Lovano, and Dave King.

== Early life ==
Cox grew up in Minneapolis and attended college at the University of Wisconsin–Eau Claire.

== Career ==
Cox plays mainly in the post-bop, avant-garde, and traditional styles, though has been described as "versatile enough to work in any style effectively." Peter Madsen wrote that Cox is "open to all kinds of great music from around the world" and that "his bass sound is full of beauty and warmth and his ability to accompany and still add very creative ideas into whatever music he is playing is remarkable. He is equally comfortable playing chord changes with Stan Getz or Kenny Wheeler or playing open music with Dewey Redman or Geri Allen."

== Discography ==
=== As leader/co-leader ===
- Third Kind of Blue (Minor Music, 1986), trio with John Purcell and Ronnie Burrage
- Falling Man (Muse, 1989), duo with Marty Ehrlich
- Dark Metals (Polygram, 1992), with Dewey Redman, Michael Cain and Billy Higgins
- Factor of Faces (Minor Music, 1993), with Bobby Franceschini, Michael Cain and Ralph Peterson Jr.
- Ríos (Intuition, 1995), trio with Dino Saluzzi and David Friedman
- Work (Sketch, 2002), trio with Steve Lacy and Daniel Humair
- That and This (Sketch, 2002), solo bass

=== As sideman ===
With Geri Allen

- The Printmakers (Minor Music, 1985)
- Maroons (Blue Note, 1992)

With Uri Caine

- Sphere Music (JMT, 1993)

With Andrew Cyrille

- X Man (Soul Note, 1994)

With David Friedman

- Shades of Change (Enja, 1986), with Geri Allen and Ronnie Burrage
- Other Worlds (Intuition, 1997), trio with Jean-Louis Matinier

With Craig Harris

- Shelter (JMT 1987)
- Blackout in the Square Root of Soul (JMT, 1989)

With Joe Lovano

- Quartets: Live at the Village Vanguard (Blue Note, 1994)
- Sounds of Joy (Enja, 1991)

With the Ron Miles Quartet

- Laughing Barrel (Sterling Circle, 2003), with Brandon Ross and Rudy Royston

With James Newton

- If Love (Jazzline, 1990)

With Mike Nock

- Not We But One (Naxos Jazz, 1997)

With Jim Pepper

- Afro Indian Blues (PAO, 2006), with Amina Claudine Myers and Leopoldo Fleming

With Bobby Previte

- Weather Clear, Track Fast (Enja, 1991)
- Hue and Cry (Enja, 1993)

With Dewey Redman

- African Venus (Evidence, 1992)

With Sam Rivers' Rivbea Orchestra

- Jazzbühne Berlin '82 (Repertoire, 1990)

With John Scofield

- Flat Out (Gramavision, 1989)

With Rory Stuart

- Hurricane (Sunnyside, 1987)

With Gary Thomas

- By Any Means Necessary (JMT, 1989)
- While the Gate Is Open (JMT, 1990)
- The Kold Kage (JMT, 1991)
- Till We Have Faces (JMT, 1992)

With Gust William Tsilis

- Pale Fire (Enja, 1988), Alithea with Allen Farnham, Arto Tuncboyaciyan, Horacee Arnold feat. Arthur Blythe
- Possibilities (Ken, 1991), quartet with Peter Madsen and Billy Hart

With Jack Walrath

- In Europe (SteepleChase, 1982)
- A Plea for Sanity (Stash, 1982)
- Jack Walrath Quintet at Umbria Jazz Festival, Vol. 1 (Red, 1983 [1985])
- Jack Walrath Quintet at Umbria Jazz Festival, Vol. 2 (Red, 1983 [1985])
- Master of Suspense (Blue Note, 1987)
- Neohippus (Blue Note, 1988)
- Out of the Tradition (Muse, 1990 [1992])
- Gut Feelings (Muse, 1990 [1992])
