= In a Sentimental Mood (disambiguation) =

"In a Sentimental Mood" is a 1935 jazz composition by Duke Ellington.

In a Sentimental Mood may also refer to:

- In a Sentimental Mood (Dr. John album)
- In a Sentimental Mood (Houston Person album)
- In a Sentimental Mood: Mathis Sings Ellington
