= Times Like These (Gary Burton album) =

Studio album by Gary Burton
- Released: 1988
- Genre: Jazz
- Length: 43:34
- Label: GRP
- Producer: Gary Burton

Gary Burton chronology
The New Tango (1987)	Times Like These (1988)	Reunion (1989)

Times Like These is an album by vibraphonist Gary Burton released on the GRP label in 1988. The all-star quartet includes guitarist John Scofield, bassist Marc Johnson and former Weather Report drummer Peter Erskine. Tenor saxophonist Michael Brecker sits in on two tracks.

== Reception ==
The Allmusic review by Scott Yanow awarded the album 4½ stars stating "Burton sounds fine on the diverse material. Since John Scofield had not had an opportunity to record with the vibraphonist during his year with Burton's Quartet more than a decade earlier, this fine set made up for lost time".

Professional ratings
Review scores
Source	Rating
Allmusic	4.5/5 stars

== Track listing ==
1. Times Like These" (Makoto Ozone) - 6:33
2. "Or Else" (Vince Mendoza) - 4:45
3. "Robert Frost" (Jay Leonhart) - 6:27
4. "Why'd You Do It?" (John Scofield) - 5:16
5. "P.M." (Chick Corea) - 6:30
6. "Was It Long Ago?" (Gary Burton) - 7:47
7. "Bento Box" (Ozone) - 6:16
8. "Do Tell" (Scofield) - 7:21

- Recorded at Clinton Studios, NYC

== Personnel ==
- Gary Burton — vibraphone, marimba
- John Scofield — guitar
- Marc Johnson — bass
- Peter Erskine — drums
- Michael Brecker — tenor saxophone (tracks 1 & 6)
