= Pariah's Pariah =

Studio album by Gary Thomas
- Released: 1998
- Recorded: October 24–25, 1997
- Studio: Sound on Sound, New York City
- Genre: Jazz
- Length: 66:03
- Label: Winter & Winter; 910 033
- Producer: Stefan F. Winter

Gary Thomas chronology
Found on Sordid Streets (1997)	Pariah's Pariah (1998)

Pariah's Pariah is the tenth album by saxophonist Gary Thomas recorded in 1997 and released on the Winter & Winter label.

== Reception ==
Professional ratings
Review scores
Source	Rating
AllMusic	4/5 stars
The Penguin Guide to Jazz Recordings	3/4 stars

AllMusic awarded the album 4 stars stating it "maintains a consistently high level of musical quality from start to finish". AllAboutJazz called it "a powerful recording that instills hope and assurance for the future of Modern Jazz. Stefan Winter of Winter & Winter continues his superb track record of producing quality product that is essential listening for the serious Jazz collector/audiophile. Pariah’s Pariah hits the high mark and won’t disappoint. Highly Recommended".

== Track listing ==
All compositions by Gary Thomas

1. "Who's in Control?" ("Only Hearsay") - 8:38
2. "Only Hearsay" ("Pariah's Pariah") - 13:08
3. "Pariah's Pariah" (not) - 9:14
4. "Zero Tolerance" ("Who's In Control?") - 10:38
5. "Vanishing Time" - 9:51
6. "For Those Who Still Hear the..." - 7:03
7. "Is Everything Relative?" - 7:27

== Personnel ==
- Gary Thomas - tenor saxophone, flute
- Greg Osby - alto saxophone
- Michael Formanek - bass
- John Arnold - drums

== Notes ==
The track names are wrong, at least for the first four songs. For instance, "Who's in Control" is "Only Hearsay," "Only Hearsay" is "Pariah's Pariah," and "Zero Tolerance" is "Who's In Control."
