= Blue Velvet (Houston Person album) =

Studio album by Houston Person
- Released: November 13, 2001
- Recorded: July 10, 2001
- Studio: Van Gelder Studio, Englewood Cliffs, NJ
- Genre: Jazz
- Length: 52:00
- Label: HighNote; HCD 7090
- Producer: Houston Person

Houston Person chronology
Dialogues (2000)	Blue Velvet (2001)	Sentimental Journey (2002)

Blue Velvet is an album by saxophonist Houston Person which was recorded in 2001 and released on the HighNote label.

== Reception ==
Professional ratings
Review scores
Source	Rating
Allmusic	3/5 stars
The Penguin Guide to Jazz Recordings	4/4 stars

In his review on Allmusic, Stewart Mason states " It's impossible to fault any of Houston Person's albums from this period, as the tenor saxophonist remains a sublimely gifted soloist with a gorgeous, well-rounded tone and a smartly melodic soloing sense ... This is undeniably fine music, but there's so little to differentiate this album from so many others that Houston Person has done that finally, it's primarily of interest either to die-hard fans or those who have near heard any albums from this period in Person's career. Honestly, if you've heard one, you've heard them all". The Penguin Guide to Jazz Recordings describes Blue Velvet as one of Person’s best albums.

== Track listing ==
1. "Everything I Have Is Yours" (Burton Lane, Harold Adamson) – 5:33
2. "Wonder Why" (Nicholas Brodszky, Sammy Cahn) – 4:04
3. "Blame It on My Youth" (Oscar Levant, Edward Heyman) – 6:48
4. "Too Late Now" (Lane, Alan Jay Lerner) – 7:43
5. "There's No You" (Hal Hopper, Tom Adair) – 5:52
6. "Be My Love" (Brodszky, Cahn) – 6:04
7. "I Want to Talk About You" (Billy Eckstine) – 4:14
8. "I Hadn't Anyone Till You" (Ray Noble) – 5:09
9. "Blue Velvet" (Bernie Wayne, Lee Morris) – 6:33

== Personnel ==
- Houston Person – tenor saxophone
- Richard Wyands – piano
- Ray Drummond – bass
- Grady Tate – drums
