= Joshua Ginsburg =

American jazz musician

Joshua Ginsburg is an American jazz bassist and composer. He has toured internationally with Kurt Rosenwinkel, Jeremy Pelt, George Colligan, Logan Richardson, Sachal Vasandani, and Helen Sung. He has performed with Tom Harrell, Mulgrew Miller, Mark Turner, Robert Glasper, Jeff "Tain" Watts, Ambrose Akinmusire, and Aaron Parks.

Zembla Variations, his first album as a leader, was released by Brooklyn Jazz Underground in 2012 and featured Eli Degibri on saxophone, George Colligan on piano, and Rudy Royston on drums. It was well received by critics and was named a 2012 Album of the Year by New York City Jazz Record.

He was born in Baltimore, Maryland and lived in Brooklyn, New York for 18 years.

== Discography ==
=== As leader ===
- Zembla Variations (Brooklyn Jazz Underground, 2012)

=== As sideman ===
- Andrew Adair, States (Fresh Sound, 1999)
- Aaron Parks, The Wizard (2001)
- Metta Quintet, Going to Meet the Man (Koch, 2002)
- Martin Shack, Headin' Home (Storyville, 2002)
- George Colligan, Blood Pressure (Ultimatum, 2006)
- Metta Quintet, Subway Songs (Sunnyside, 2006)
- George Colligan, Runaway (Sunnyside, 2008)
- Soren Moller, Christian X Variations (Audial, 2010)
- George Colligan, Living for the City (Steeplechase, 2011)
- Tim Green, Songs from This Season (True Melody Music, 2013)
