= Petite Blonde =

1992 live jazz album

Live album by Victor Bailey, Dennis Chambers, Mitch Forman, Chuck Loeb, and Bill Evans
- Released: October 1992
- Recorded: Neuwied Jazz Festival and The Fabrik, Hamburg, July 1992
- Genre: Jazz
- Length: 53:32
- Label: Lipstick Records
- Producer: Joachim Becker

Professional ratings
Review scores
| Source | Rating |
|---|---|
| Allmusic | link |

Petite Blonde is a live jazz collaboration album. It features Victor Bailey on bass, Dennis Chambers on drums, Mitch Forman on keyboards, Chuck Loeb on guitar, and Bill Evans on saxophone (soprano and tenor). It was recorded live on July 4, 1992, at the Neuwied Jazzfestival and on July 14, 1992, at The Fabrik in Hamburg, Germany.

== Track listing ==
| # | Title | Writer | Length |
|---|---|---|---|
| 1 | "Two Price Hit" | Bill Evans, Chuck Loeb | 9:00 |
| 2 | "Brancas Hal" | Bill Evans | 6:49 |
| 3 | "Millennium" | Chuck Loeb | 9:42 |
| 4 | "Oh So Hip" | Bill Evans | 6:16 |
| 5 | "Daddy's Long Leg" | Chuck Loeb | 13:49 |
| 6 | "The Watcher" | Mitch Forman | 8:39 |
| 7 | "Captain Brutis" | Bill Evans | 8:17 |

== Personnel ==
- Mitchel Forman – keyboards
- Chuck Loeb – guitars
- Victor Bailey – bass
- Dennis Chambers – drums
- Bill Evans – soprano saxophone, tenor saxophone

== Production ==
- Joachim Becker – executive producer, producer
- Cedric Beatty – recording
- Klaus Genuit – mixing
- Dennis Brockhausen – assistant engineer
- Norbert Gutzmann – assistant engineer
- Radu Marinescu – mastering at Acoustic Entertainment (Cologne, Germany)
- Darryl Pitt – cover concept, photography
- Katrin Schoeren – group photography
- Gregory Vider – design
