= Smooth Sailing (Teddy Edwards album) =

Studio album by Teddy Edwards
- Released: March 11, 2003
- Recorded: December 19, 2001
- Studio: M&I Recording Studios, NYC
- Genre: Jazz
- Length: 50:00
- Label: HighNote; HCD 7088
- Producer: Houston Person

Teddy Edwards chronology
The Legend of Teddy Edwards (2000)	Smooth Sailing (2003)

Smooth Sailing is the final album by the saxophonist Teddy Edwards. It was recorded in 2001 and released on the HighNote label in 2003.

== Reception ==
Professional ratings
Review scores
Source	Rating
AllMusic	4/5 stars
The Encyclopedia of Popular Music	3/5 stars
The Penguin Guide to Jazz Recordings	3/4 stars

In his review on AllMusic, Scott Yanow writes: "Although veteran tenor saxophonist Teddy Edwards was having serious health problems by 2001, he is in excellent form throughout this set, showing no signs of decline or age. Playing in New York with a top-notch quartet that includes pianist Richard Wyands, Edwards caresses some of the melodies (his long tones are impressive), he swings hard in spots, and he shows great affection for the material. ... Throughout, Teddy Edwards shows that in 2001 he was still in his musical prime."

On All About Jazz, Terrell Kent Holmes called it "a fine example of economical playing and arrangement" and noted "Edwards, now approaching 80 years old, shows on Smooth Sailing that he's as formidable a sax man as ever. More power to any septuagenerian who swings."

The authors of The Penguin Guide to Jazz Recordings stated that Edwards "was in failing health" when the album was recorded, "but you wouldn't know it... Even at this age and even seriously ill, Teddy was able to swing a line with the best of them."

David Franklin of Jazz Times commented: "Smooth Sailing... shows that [Edwards'] buoyant sense of swing and tender way with a ballad remain intact. Not surprising for a man of his age, his intonation is occasionally insecure... but that aside, these eight performances are remarkable for someone of his years."

== Track listing ==
1. "Going Home" (Teddy Edwards) – 8:29
2. "All Too Soon" (Duke Ellington, Carl Sigman) – 4:50
3. "Hank's Tune" (Hank Mobley) – 5:22
4. "Indian Summer" (Victor Herbert, Al Dubin) – 6:17
5. "Robbin's Nest" (Illinois Jacquet, Bob Russell) – 6:43
6. "It's the Talk of the Town" (Jerry Livingston, Al J. Neiburg, Marty Symes) – 7:13
7. "Smooth Sailing" (Arnett Cobb) – 5:39
8. "Polka Dots and Moonbeams" (Jimmy Van Heusen, Johnny Burke) – 5:27

== Personnel ==
- Teddy Edwards – tenor saxophone
- Richard Wyands – piano
- Ray Drummond – double bass
- Chip White – drums
