= Sentimental Journey (Houston Person album) =

Studio album by Houston Person
- Released: November 12, 2002
- Recorded: May 22, 2002
- Studio: Van Gelder Studio, Englewood Cliffs, NJ
- Genre: Jazz
- Length: 56:44
- Label: HighNote; HCD 7101
- Producer: Houston Person

Houston Person chronology
Blue Velvet (2001)	Sentimental Journey (2002)	Social Call (2003)

Sentimental Journey is an album by saxophonist Houston Person which was recorded in 2002 and released on the HighNote label.

== Reception ==
Professional ratings
Review scores
Source	Rating
Allmusic	4/5 stars
The Penguin Guide to Jazz Recordings	3/4 stars

In his review on Allmusic, Scott Yanow states "As the 21st century began, Houston Person was one of the last in a tradition of tough-toned but warm tenors able to straddle the boundaries between soul-jazz, hard bop, and soulful R&B. An expert at caressing and uplifting melodies, Person plays in the tradition of Gene Ammons. Person is in excellent form throughout this quartet/quintet date ... Sentimental Journey is a strong example of his talents". In JazzTimes, David Franklin wrote: "Houston Person is still carrying on the great tenor saxophone tradition that combines breathy soulfulness with blues-drenched, stomping swing. The lush-toned tenorist’s latest release, Sentimental Journey, verifies his continuing command of the idiom. ... It’s an increasingly rare pleasure to hear a sensitive player like Houston Person pay respect to great melodies, rendering them essentially as written. But it’s also good that his new record offers plenty of opportunities for straightahead blowing by some fine improvisers".

== Track listing ==
1. "Sentimental Journey" (Les Brown, Ben Homer, Bud Green) – 6:08
2. "A Sunday Kind of Love" (Barbara Belle, Anita Leonard, Louis Prima, Stan Rhodes) – 6:21
3. "It Had to Be You" (Isham Jones, Gus Kahn) – 6:36
4. "Fools Rush In" (Rube Bloom, Johnny Mercer) – 5:48
5. "Black Velvet" (Jimmy Mundy) – 6:45
6. "Save Your Love for Me" (Buddy Johnson) – 7:18
7. "What'll I Do" (Irving Berlin) – 6:18
8. "I Love You Yes I Do" (Henry Glover, Sally Nix) – 4:52
9. "Canadian Sunset" (Eddie Heywood, Norman Gimbel) – 6:38

== Personnel ==
- Houston Person – tenor saxophone
- Richard Wyands – piano
- Russell Malone – guitar (tracks 1, 3, 5 & 6)
- Peter Washington – bass
- Grady Tate – drums
