= To Etta with Love =

Studio album by Houston Person
- Released: September 14, 2004
- Recorded: January 21, 2004
- Studio: Van Gelder Studio, Englewood Cliffs, NJ
- Genre: Jazz
- Length: 54:24
- Label: HighNote; HCD 7127
- Producer: Houston Person

Houston Person chronology
Social Call (2003)	To Etta with Love (2004)	You Taught My Heart to Sing (2004)

To Etta with Love is an album by saxophonist Houston Person which was recorded in 2004 and released on the HighNote label. The album is a tribute to Person's musical partner Etta Jones.

== Reception ==
Professional ratings
Review scores
Source	Rating
Allmusic	4.5/5 stars
All About Jazz	3/5 stars
The Penguin Guide to Jazz Recordings	4/4 stars

In his review on Allmusic, Matt Collar states "To Etta With Love finds Person digging into various standards that Jones loved throughout her career. There is a melancholy, heartbreaking quality to these tracks. ... The journeyman's warm, burnished tenor sound veritably weeps and more often soars ... Much like the singer Person knew, To Etta With Love is an understated, moving, and swinging elegy". On All About Jazz, John Kelman noted "In a career filled with highs, one thing that made Jones and Person so well-known was their commitment to playing in smaller neighbourhood clubs that others would pass by. With To Etta With Love Person delivers a bittersweet love letter that has all the dusky ambience of one of those dimly-lit establishments ... it's vital that younger listeners be aware of the vibrant history that has brought jazz to where it is today. To Etta With Love combines rich history with tribute, evocatively showing just how much the landscape of jazz has changed". In JazzTimes, David Franklin wrote: "Person’s playing is predictably wistful and pensive. Indeed, on several tunes, including Etta’s two hits, he merely caresses the songs’ original themes with his gorgeous tone and breathy attack rather than create melodies of his own".

== Track listing ==
1. "It's Magic" (Jule Styne, Sammy Cahn) – 5:18
2. "Love Walked In" (George Gershwin, Ira Gershwin) – 6:20
3. "Don't Misunderstand" (Gordon Parks) – 4:43
4. "I Should Care" (Axel Stordahl, Paul Weston, Cahn) – 4:55
5. "Don't Go to Strangers" (Arthur Kent, Dave Mann, Redd Evans) – 5:22
6. "For All We Know" (J. Fred Coots, Sam M. Lewis) – 6:00
7. "Since I Fell for You" (Buddy Johnson) – 6:31
8. "Ain't Misbehavin'" (Fats Waller, Harry Brooks, Andy Razaf) – 4:31
9. "What a Wonderful World" (George Douglas, George David Weiss) – 7:11
10. "Gee, Baby, Ain't I Good to You" (Don Redman, Razaf) – 3:33

== Personnel ==
- Houston Person – tenor saxophone
- Stan Hope – piano
- Paul Bollenback – guitar
- Per-Ola Gadd – bass
- Chip White – drums
