= The Way We Were: Live in Concert =

Live album by Etta Jones and Houston Person
- Released: April 26, 2011
- Recorded: April 15, 2000
- Venue: Tri-C Jazz Festival, Cleveland, OH
- Genre: Jazz
- Length: 58:56
- Label: Highnote; HCD 7197
- Producer: Houston Person

Etta Jones chronology
Together at Christmas (2000)	The Way We Were: Live in Concert (2011)	Etta Jones Sings Lady Day (2001)

Houston Person chronology
Together at Christmas (2000)	The Way We Were: Live in Concert (2000)	In a Sentimental Mood (2000)

The Way We Were: Live in Concert is a live album by vocalist Etta Jones and saxophonist Houston Person which was recorded in Cleveland in 2000 but not released on the Highnote label until 2011.

== Reception ==
Professional ratings
Review scores
Source	Rating
Allmusic	3.5/5 stars

In his review on Allmusic, Steve Leggett notes that "Etta Jones could flat-out sing, and she never failed to make the blues, jazz, and Great American Songbook standards she sang her own, especially in her many collaborations with tenor saxophonist Houston Person, who was as sympathetic a player as any singer could ever hope for – Jones and Person simply clicked and understood each other as a duo ... This set is both a pleasant listen and a fun archival recording – it captures Jones and Person at their best in front of a nimble and flexible rhythm section"

== Track listing ==
1. "Do Nothin' Till You Hear from Me" (Duke Ellington, Bob Russell) – 6:49
2. "The Way We Were" (Marvin Hamlisch, Alan Bergman, Marilyn Bergman) – 7:15
3. "'Deed I Do" (Fred Rose, Walter Hirsch) – 5:17
4. "Please Send Me Someone to Love" (Percy Mayfield) – 5:48
5. "Fine and Mellow" (Billie Holiday) – 6:28
6. "Oh, Lady Be Good!" (George Gershwin, Ira Gershwin) – 4:11
7. "Somewhere in My Lifetime" (Jesus Alvarez) – 5:32
8. "I Could Have Danced All Night" (Frederick Loewe, Alan Jay Lerner) – 3:57
9. "What a Wonderful World" (George Douglas, George David Weiss) – 5:05
10. "Ma! He's Making Eyes at Me" (Con Conrad, Sidney Clare) – 2:07
11. "Don't Go to Strangers" (Arthur Kent, Dave Mann, Redd Evans) – 3:50
12. "I'll Be Seeing You" (Sammy Fain, Irving Kahal) – 2:37

== Personnel ==
- Etta Jones – vocals
- Houston Person – tenor saxophone
- Stan Hope – piano
- George Kaye – bass
- Chip White – drums
