= Found on Sordid Streets =

Studio album by Gary Thomas
- Released: 1997
- Recorded: February 19–22 & June 17–18, 1996
- Studio: Big Mo Recording Studio, Kensington, Maryland
- Genre: Jazz
- Length: 62:20
- Label: Winter & Winter; 910 002
- Producer: Stefan F. Winter

Gary Thomas chronology
Overkill (1994)	Found on Sordid Streets (1997)	Pariah's Pariah (1998)

Found on Sodid Streets is the ninth album by saxophonist Gary Thomas recorded in 1996 and released on the Winter & Winter label.

== Reception ==
AllMusic awarded the album 4 stars.

Professional ratings
Review scores
Source	Rating
AllMusic	4/5 stars
The Penguin Guide to Jazz Recordings	3/4 stars

== Track listing ==
All compositions by Gary Thomas except as indicated

1. "Spellbound" (George Colligan) - 10:04
2. "Treason" - 6:42 (lyrics by No Name & Pork Chop)
3. "The Eternal Present" (Terri Lyne Carrington) - 9:04
4. "Exile's Gate" - 10:41
5. "Hyper Space" (Colligan) - 9:07
6. "Found on Sordid Streets" - 8:36
7. "Peace of the Korridor" - 8:02

== Personnel ==
- Gary Thomas - tenor saxophone
- No Name, Pork Chop - rap (on #2 only)
- Paul Bollenback - guitar
- George Colligan - organ
- Howard Curtis - drums
- Steve Moss - percussion
