= Reunion (Gary Burton album) =

Studio album by Gary Burton
- Released: January 23, 1990
- Recorded: May 6–10, 1989
- Studio: Studio A, Power Station, New York City
- Genre: Jazz fusion
- Length: 58:35
- Label: GRP
- Producer: Gary Burton

Gary Burton chronology
Times Like These (1988)	Reunion (1990)	Right Time, Right Place (1990)

Professional ratings
Review scores
Source	Rating
AllMusic	4/5 stars
The Encyclopedia of Popular Music	4/5 stars

Reunion is a 1989 album by vibraphonist Gary Burton, reuniting him with his former guitarist Pat Metheny for the first time in 13 years. Burton met Metheny at the Wichita Jazz Festival in 1973 (when Metheny was 18 years old), later welcoming him as a teaching colleague at the Berklee College of Music. He hired Metheny for the newly expanded Gary Burton Quintet in 1974. Burton and Metheny feature alongside keyboardist Mitchel Forman, bass guitarist Will Lee and drummer Peter Erskine.

Metheny left Burton's group in 1977 to form his own quartet with Lyle Mays. The two had virtually no contact with each other until, in early 1988, the organizers of the Montreal Jazz Festival contacted Burton. They told him that Metheny was the festival host and invited Burton to join him onstage. "My apprehension was immediately erased when I saw how easy it was for us to play together, even after 12 years," said Burton. This led to their collaboration on Reunion.

== Track listing ==
Side one:
No.	Title	Length
1.	"Autumn" (Polo Orti)	4:24
2.	"Reunion" (Mitchel Forman)	5:15
3.	"Origin" (Mitchel Forman)	6:31
4.	"Will You Say You Will" (Vince Mendoza)	4:55
5.	"House on the Hill" (Pat Metheny)	5:40

Side two:
No.	Title	Length
1.	"Panama" (Paul Meyers)	5:38
2.	"Chairs and Children" (Vince Mendoza)	5:55
3.	"Wasn't Always Easy" (Pat Metheny)	5:06
4.	"The Chief" (Pat Metheny)	4:16
5.	"Tiempos Felice" (Polo Orti)	4:13
6.	"Quick and Running" (Polo Orti)	6:42

== Personnel ==
- Gary Burton – vibraphone, marimba
- Pat Metheny – guitar
- Mitchel Forman – piano, keyboards
- Will Lee – bass guitar
- Peter Erskine – drums, percussion

Technical personnel

- Gary Burton – producer
- Dave Grusin, Larry Rosen – executive producers
- Rob Eaton – recording, mixing
- Dan Gellert – assistant engineer
- Ted Jensen – mastering
- Ben Levy – artwork
- Gildas Bollé – photography

== Chart performance ==
Album – Billboard

Year	Chart	Position
1990	Billboard Top Jazz Albums	1

== External links and sources ==
- Reunion at Allmusic
- Liner notes by Neil Tesser
