= Social Call (Houston Person album) =

Studio album by Houston Person
- Released: 2003
- Recorded: May 8, 2003
- Studio: Van Gelder Studio, Englewood Cliffs, NJ
- Genre: Jazz
- Label: HighNote; HCD 7115
- Producer: Houston Person

Houston Person chronology
Sentimental Journey (2002)	Social Call (2003)	To Etta with Love (2004)

Social Call is an album by saxophonist Houston Person which was recorded in 2003 and released on the HighNote label.

== Reception ==
Professional ratings
Review scores
Source	Rating
The Penguin Guide to Jazz Recordings	3/4 stars

On All About Jazz, Jeff Stockton noted "Social Call is the mellow sound of the music as it used to be done. Even those who are indifferent to jazz, or even dislike jazz, can't help but enjoy this". In JazzTimes, David Franklin wrote: "Houston Person’s Social Call showcases breathy, subtone tenor. Indeed, beautiful melodies, lovingly caressed by Person’s sultry horn, constitute a generous portion of this recording. Slow tunes ... make up more than half the 11 tracks. Person treats them all with a lyrical sensitivity that allows the venerable melodies to speak for themselves". The Guardian selected it as their Jazz CD of the Week with Dave Gelly commenting "The whole thing is so agreeable that it's hard to pick bits out, but Person's firm, warm, unflappable ballad playing is a particular delight"

== Track listing ==
1. "Social Call" (Gigi Gryce) – 5:25
2. "If You Could See Me Now" (Tadd Dameron, Carl Sigman) – 5:42
3. "Juicy Lucy" (Horace Silver) – 5:51
4. "Evening Star" (Benny Carter) – 4:59
5. "The End of a Love Affair" (E. C. Redding) – 5:12
6. "Bewitched" (Richard Rodgers, Lorenz Hart) – 4:39
7. "I'll Let You Know" (Cedar Walton) – 4:46
8. "Stolen Sweets" (Wild Bill Davis, Dan Thompson) – 5:09
9. "Day Dream" (Billy Strayhorn, Duke Ellington, John La Touche) – 4:59
10. "Easy Walker" (Teddi Lastion) – 4:48
11. "Some Other Spring" (Arthur Herzog Jr., Irene Kitchings) – 4:42

== Personnel ==
- Houston Person – tenor saxophone
- Stan Hope – piano
- Paul Bollenback − guitar
- Per-Ola Gadd – bass
- Chip White – drums
