= Paul Bollenback =

American jazz guitarist

- Born: Paul Norris Bollenback; June 6, 1959; Hinsdale, Illinois, U.S.
- Genres: Jazz
- Occupation: Musician
- Instrument: Guitar
- Years active: 1990–present
- Label: Challenge

Paul Norris Bollenback (born June 6, 1959) is a jazz guitarist who has appeared on Entertainment Tonight, The Tonight Show, The Today Show, Joan Rivers, and Good Morning America. He has performed with Scott Ambush, Charlie Byrd, Joey DeFrancesco, Herb Ellis, Della Reese, Arturo Sandoval, and Stanley Turrentine. He is cited as a guitarist who uses modern quartal harmony.

Bollenback moved to India with his family when he was 11. After three years, the family returned to the U.S. and Bollenback began listening to rock music. He put down his nylon-string guitar and picked up an electric. He cites his discovery of Miles Davis as a pivotal moment in his life. He attended the University of Miami. In 1997, he began teaching at American University.

== Discography ==
=== As leader ===
- Original Visions (Challenge, 1995)
- Double Gemini (Challenge, 1997)
- Soul Grooves (Challenge, 1999)
- Double Vision (Challenge, 2000)
- Dreams (Challenge, 2001)
- Alone and Tohether, with Andrei Kondakov (Boheme Music, 2002)
- Brightness of Being (Elefant Dreams, 2006)
- Invocation (Elefant Dreams, 2007)
- Portraits in Space and Time (Mayimba Music, 2014)
- Synergy (Steeplechase, 2025)

=== As sideman ===
With Joey DeFrancesco

- Part III (Columbia, 1991)
- Reboppin (Columbia, 1992)
- Live at the 5 Spot (Columbia, 1993)
- All About My Girl (Muse, 1994)
- The Street of Dreams (Big Mo, 1995)
- Incredible! (Concord Jazz, 2000)
- The Champ Round 2 (HighNote, 2000)
- The Philadelphia Connection (HighNote, 2002)
- Ballads and Blues (Concord, 2002)
- Snapshot (HighNote, 2009)
- Never Can Say Goodbye (HighNote, 2010)

With Jim Snidero

- Tippin' (Savant, 2007)
- Crossfire (Savant, 2009)
- Interface (Savant, 2011)
- Stream of Consciousness (Savant, 2013)

With Gary Thomas

- Seventh Quadrant (Enja, 1987)
- Code Violations (Enja, 1988)
- The Kold Kage (JMT, 1991)
- Exile's Gate (JMT, 1993)
- Found on Sordid Streets (Winter & Winter, 1997)

With others

- Christy Baron, Take This Journey (Chesky, 2002)
- Gary Bartz, Live @ the Jazz Standard Mae Velha Vol 2 (OYO, 2005)
- Bob Berg, Randy Brecker, Dennis Chambers, Joey DeFrancesco, The JazzTimes Superband (Concord, 2000)
- Pat Bianchi, In the Moment (Savant, 2018)
- Pat Bianchi, Something to Say: The Music of Stevie Wonder (Savant, 2020)
- Terri Lyne Carrington, Jazz Is a Spirit (ACT, 2002)
- Steve Gadd, Live at Voce (BFM, 2010)
- Tim Garland, Libra (Global Mix, 2009)
- Greg Hatza, Organization (Palmetto, 1995)
- Greg Hatza, Snake Eyes (Palmetto, 1998)
- Ron Holloway, Slanted (Milestone, 1994)
- Ron Holloway, Scorcher (Milestone, 1996)
- Joe Locke, Beauty Burning (Sirocco, 2000)
- Joe Locke, State of Soul (Sirocco, 2002)
- Tony Monaco, Burnin' Grooves (Summit, 2001)
- Mark Murphy, Memories of You: Remembering Joe Williams (HighNote, 2003)
- Shunzo Ohno, ReNew (Pulsebeats, 2016)
- Houston Person, Social Call (HighNote, 2003)
- Houston Person, To Etta with Love (HighNote, 2004)
- Houston Person, The Art and Soul of Houston Person (HighNote, 2008)
- Marilyn Scott, Every Time We Say Goodbye (Venus, 2008)
- Carol Sloane, I Never Went Away (HighNote, 2001)
- Carol Sloane, Whisper Sweet (HighNote, 2003)
- Steve Wilson, Soulful Song (Maxjazz, 2003)
