= Small Room =

Studio album by George Colligan
- Released: 2000
- Recorded: September 1998
- Genre: Jazz
- Label: SteepleChase

Small Room is a solo piano album by George Colligan. It was recorded in 1998 and released by SteepleChase Records.

== Recording and music ==
The album was recorded in September 1998. The material and performances vary – from standards and ballads to exploratory and impressionistic.

== Release and reception ==
Professional ratings
Review scores
Source	Rating
The Penguin Guide to Jazz Recordings	3.5/4 stars

Small Room was released by SteepleChase Records in 2000. The Penguin Guide to Jazz wrote: "This is no premature indulgence. If anything, it's a rather sober effort."

== Track listing ==
1. "I Love Music" (Emil Boyd)
2. "Afterthought" (Bill McHenry)
3. "Exile's Gate" (Gary Thomas)
4. "Elves" (George Colligan)
5. "The Dolphin" (Eca)
6. "When Your Lover Has Gone" (E. A. Swan)
7. "Small Room" (Colligan)
8. "Rule's End" (Christoph Schweitzer)
9. "Voyage" (Kenny Barron)
10. "Quincy" (David Ephross)
11. "Some Other Time" (Leonard Bernstein)
12. "Caravan" (Duke Ellington/Juan Tizol)
13. "Only Trust Your Heart" (Brodsky)

== Personnel ==
- George Colligan – piano
