= George Colligan =

American jazz musician

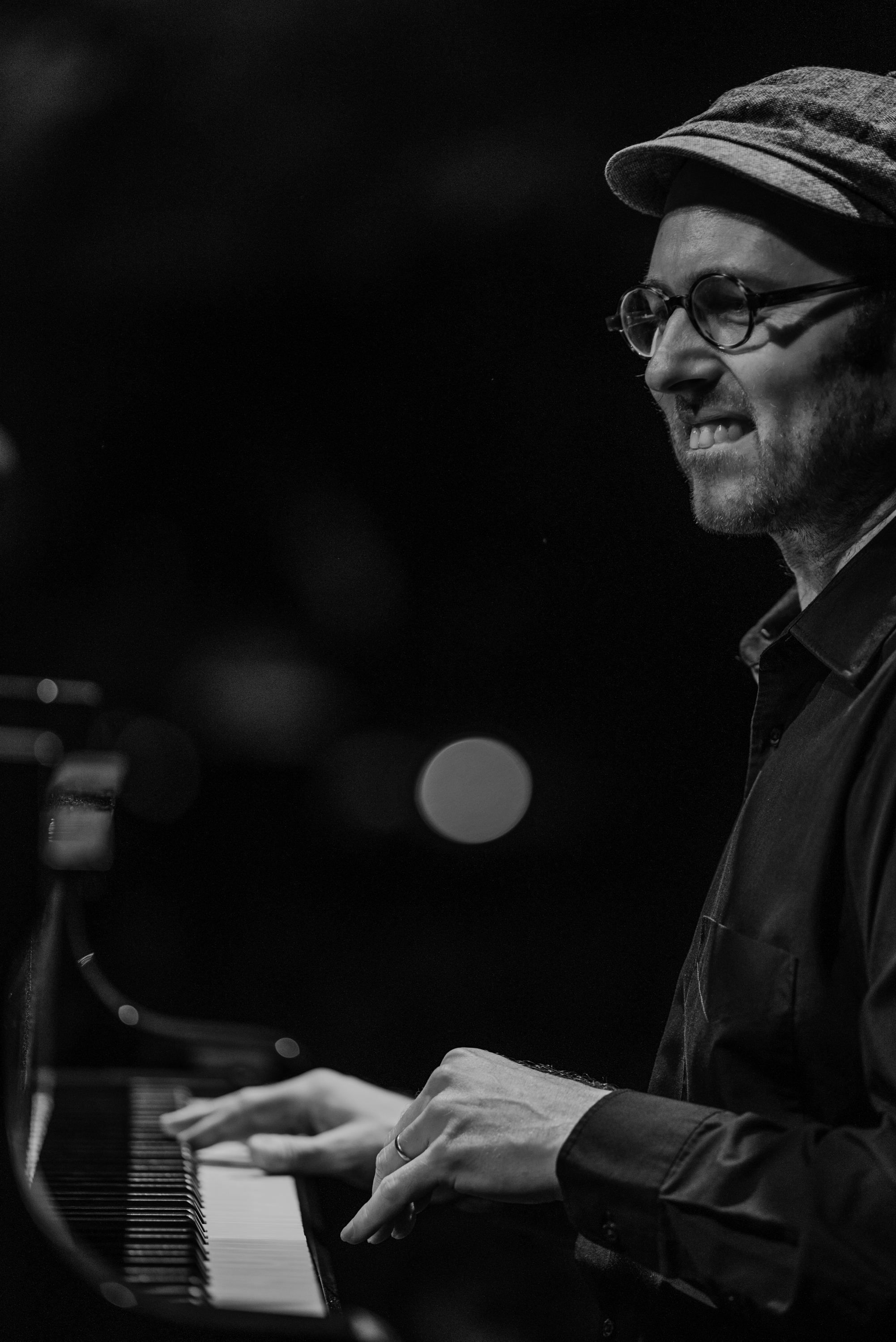

Background information
- Born: December 29, 1969 (age 56); New Jersey, U.S.
- Genres: Jazz, chamber music
- Instruments: Piano, organ, drums, trumpet
- Website: georgecolligan.com

George Colligan (born December 29, 1969) is an American jazz pianist, organist, drummer, trumpeter, educator, composer, and bandleader.

== Early life and education ==
Colligan was born in New Jersey and raised in Columbia, Maryland. He attended the Peabody Institute, majoring in classical trumpet and music education. In high school, he learned to play the drums and later switched to piano. His playing is influenced by Chick Corea, Miles Davis, Herbie Hancock, Thelonious Monk, Wayne Shorter, and McCoy Tyner.

== Career ==
As a sideman, he has worked with Phil Woods, Gary Bartz, Robin Eubanks, Billy Higgins, Lee Konitz, Nicholas Payton, Steve Wilson, Richard Bona, Cassandra Wilson, Christian McBride, Buster Williams, Al Foster, Don Byron, Benny Golson, Lonnie Plaxico, and Vanessa Rubin. Colligan received a Chamber Music America Award for composition and won the Jazzconnect.com Award. He has released over twenty albums as a leader and has recorded on over 100 albums as a sideman.

Colligan has performed at festivals all over the world, including the North Sea Jazz Festival, the Edinburgh Jazz & Blues Festival, Vancouver International Jazz Festival, and the Cancun Jazz Festival. In 2007, for the first time, he played trumpet with the trio Mr. Trumpet at the annual Festival of New Trumpet Music in New York City. He taught at the Juilliard School.

In September 2009, Colligan moved to Winnipeg to teach at the University of Manitoba. He taught jazz history, piano, drums, trumpet, and led master classes. He was songwriter-in-residence at Aqua Books from February to March 2011. In July 2011, Colligan moved to Portland, Oregon, to teach at Portland State University.

== Personal life ==
Colligan is married to jazz pianist Kerry Politzer.

== Discography ==
=== As leader/co-leader ===
Recording date	Title	Label	Year released	Notes / Personnel
1995–11	Activism	SteepleChase	1996	Trio, with Dwayne Burno (bass), Ralph Peterson (drums)
1997–04	The Newcomer	SteepleChase	1997	Quartet, with Mark Turner (tenor sax), Ingrid Jensen (trumpet, flugelhorn), Dwayne Burno (bass), Billy Drummond (drums)
1997–09	Stomping Ground	SteepleChase	2000	Trio, with Drew Gress (bass), Billy Hart (drums)
1998–04	Constant Source	SteepleChase	2000	Quintet, with Jon Gordon (alto sax, soprano sax), Mark Turner (tenor sax), Ed Howard (bass), Howard Curtis (drums)
1998	Unresolved	Fresh Sound New Talent	1999	With Jon Gordon (alto sax), Mark Turner (tenor sax), Kurt Rosenwinkel (guitar), Drew Gress (bass), Howard Curtis (drums)
1998–09	Small Room	SteepleChase	2000	Solo piano
1999–02	Desire	Fresh Sound New Talent	2000	Quartet, with Perico Sambeat (alto sax, soprano sax, flute), Mario Rossy (bass), Marc Miralta (drums)
1999–03	Return to Copenhagen	SteepleChase	2002	Solo piano
1999–11	Agent 99	SteepleChase	2001	Trio, with Doug Weiss (bass), Darren Beckett (drums)
2000–02	Twins	SteepleChase	2000	Co-led duo, with Jesper Bodilsen (bass)
2000	Como La Vida Puede Ser	Fresh Sound New Talent	2001	With Perico Sambeat (alto sax, soprano sax, tenor sax, palmas), Mario Rossy (bass), Marc Miralta (drums, cajón, percussion), Guillermo Magill (cajón), Antonio Serrano (harmonica), Tom Guarna (guitar)
2001–03	A Wish	SteepleChase	2001	Co-led duo, with Jesper Bodilsen (bass)
2001–12	Ultimatum	Criss Cross Jazz	2002	Quartet, with Gary Thomas (tenor sax, flute), Drew Gress (bass), Ralph Peterson (drums)
2003–10	Past – Present – Future	Criss Cross Jazz	2005	with Bill Stewart (drums)
2004–09	Realization	Sirocco	2005	Trio, with Tom Guarna (guitar), Rodney Holmes (drums)
2006?	Blood Pressure	Ultimatum	2006	With Jamie Baum (flute), Meg Okura (violin), Joshua Ginsburg and Boris Kozlov (bass), Jonathan Blake, Vanderlei Pereira and E. J. Strickland (drums)
2009–01	Isolation	SteepleChase	2010	Solo piano
2011?	Living for the City	SteepleChase	2011	Trio, with Josh Ginsburg (bass), E.J. Stickland (drums)
2011–10	The Facts	SteepleChase	2013	Quartet, with Boris Kozlov (bass), Donald Edwards (drums), Jaleel Shaw (alto sax)
2012–01	Ask Me Tomorrow	SteepleChase	2014	Trio, with Linda Oh (bass), Ted Poor (drums)
2012–12	The Endless Mysteries	Origin	2013	Trio, with Larry Grenadier (bass), Jack DeJohnette (drums)
2014–08	Live at The Jazz Standard	Whirlwind Recordings	2025	[2LP] Live
2014?	Risky Notion	Origin	2015	Most tracks "Theoretical Planets" quartet, with Nicole Glover (tenor sax, soprano sax), Joe Manis (tenor sax, alto sax), Jon Lakey (bass); some tracks quintet, with Tony Glausi (trumpet) added; Colligan plays drums
2017–11	Nation Divided	Whirlwind Recordings	2018	Solo piano
2018?	Escape Route	PJCE	2018	As "Other Barry" trio, with Enzo Irace (guitar), Micah Hummel (drums)
2024?	You'll Hear It	La Reserve	2024	With various

=== As sideman ===
With Lee Konitz

- Pride (SteepleChase, 1999)

With Gary Thomas

- Found on Sordid Streets (Winter & Winter, 1997)

With Noah Becker

- Where We Are (ENTOUR, 2000)

With Buster Williams

- Griot Libertè (HighNote, 2004)

With Charlie Porter (trumpeter)

- Cipher (PHP, 2025)
