= Exile's Gate (album) =

Studio album by Gary Thomas
- Released: 1993
- Recorded: May 19–23, 1993
- Studio: Power Station, New York City
- Genre: Jazz
- Length: 55:41
- Label: JMT; JMT 514 009
- Producer: Stefan F. Winter, Gary Thomas

Gary Thomas chronology
Till We Have Faces (1992)	Exile's Gate (1993)	Overkill (1994)

Exile's Gate is the seventh album by saxophonist Gary Thomas recorded in 1993 and released on the JMT label.

== Reception ==
The AllMusic review by Thom Jurek states, "As a leader, saxophonist and composer Gary Thomas is wildly ambitious. Throughout the 1980s and into the '90s, Thomas experimented with everything from free jazz and funk to heavy metal and hip-hop. Exile's Gate is another such exercise... The first band plays Thomas' free-spirited and aggressive originals while the second plays standards for the most part. Only Thomas would think of putting the two approaches together on one record on alternate cuts."

Professional ratings
Review scores
Source	Rating
AllMusic	3/5 stars
The Penguin Guide to Jazz Recordings	2.5/4 stars

== Track listing ==
All compositions by Gary Thomas except as indicated

1. "Exile's Gate" - 9:26
2. "Like Someone in Love" (Johnny Burke, Jimmy Van Heusen) - 9:01
3. "Kulture Bandits" - 7:19
4. "Blues on the Corner" (McCoy Tyner) - 8:00
5. "Night and Day" (Cole Porter) - 5:46
6. "No Mercy Rule" - 8:20
7. "A Brilliant Madness" - 8:10

== Personnel ==
- Gary Thomas - tenor saxophone
- Paul Bollenback (tracks 1, 4 & 7), Marvin Sewell (tracks 2–3 & 5–6) - guitar
- Charles Covington (tracks 1, 4 & 7), Tim Murphy (tracks: 2–3 & 5–6) - organ
- Ed Howard - bass (tracks 2–3 & 5–6)
- Jack DeJohnette (tracks 1, 4 & 7), Terri Lyne Carrington (tracks 2–3 & 5–6) - drums
- Steve Moss - percussion (track 6)
