= Pick Hits Live =

Live album by John Scofield
- Released: 1988
- Recorded: October 7, 1987
- Venue: Hitomi Memorial Hall, Tokyo, Japan
- Genre: Jazz fusion
- Length: 73:31 (CD); 45:49 (vinyl)
- Label: Gramavision
- Producer: John Scofield, Eugene Harada

John Scofield chronology
| Loud Jazz (1988) | Pick Hits Live (1988) | Flat Out (1989) |

Professional ratings
Review scores
| Source | Rating |
|---|---|
| Allmusic | 4.5/5 stars |
| The Penguin Guide to Jazz Recordings | 3/4 stars |

Pick Hits Live is a live album by jazz guitarist John Scofield. It was the last of his albums to feature bass guitarist Gary Grainger and drummer Dennis Chambers.

== Track listing ==
All tracks composed by John Scofield; except where indicated

=== 1988 release ===
1. "Pick and Pans"
2. "Pick Hits"
3. "Heaven Hill"
4. "Protocol"
5. "Blue Matter"
6. "Thanks Again"
7. "Trim" (CD only)
8. "Georgia On My Mind" (Hoagy Carmichael, Stuart Gorrell) (CD only)
9. "Make Me" (CD only)

=== 1995 Japanese reissue bonus disc ===
1. Still Warm
2. The Nag
3. So You Say

== Personnel ==
The John Scofield Band

- John Scofield – electric guitar
- Robert Aries – keyboards
- Gary Grainger – bass guitar
- Dennis Chambers – drums
