= Mahavishnu (album) =

Studio album by Mahavishnu Orchestra
- Released: October 8, 1984
- Recorded: April–May 1984
- Studio: Ramses Studios, Paris
- Genre: Jazz fusion
- Length: 41:52
- Label: Warner Bros.
- Producer: John McLaughlin

Mahavishnu Orchestra chronology
Inner Worlds (1976)	Mahavishnu (1984)	Adventures in Radioland (1986)

John McLaughlin chronology
Passion, Grace and Fire (1983)	Mahavishnu (1984)	Adventures in Radioland (1986)

Professional ratings
Review scores
Source	Rating
Allmusic	3/5 stars
The Rolling Stone Jazz Record Guide	4/5 stars

Mahavishnu is an album by the Mahavishnu Orchestra, released in 1984 by Warner Bros. Records. During the 1980s, John McLaughlin reformed the Mahavishnu Orchestra for release of the two albums Mahavishnu and Adventures in Radioland. This band's overall sound was radically different from the original Mahavishnu Orchestra, in particular because of McLaughlin's extensive use of the Synclavier synthesiser system. This album features original Mahavishnu Orchestra drummer Billy Cobham.

== Track listing ==
- All songs written by John McLaughlin, except where noted.

Side one
No.	Title	Length
1.	"Radio-Activity"	6:52
2.	"Nostalgia"	5:56
3.	"Nightriders"	3:47
4.	"East Side West Side"	4:55

Side two
No.	Title	Music	Length
1.	"Clarendon Hills"	Bill Evans	6:03
2.	"Jazz"		1:43
3.	"The Unbeliever"		2:47
4.	"Pacific Express"		6:30
5.	"When Blue Turns Gold"		3:19

== Personnel ==
=== Mahavishnu Orchestra ===
- John McLaughlin - Synclavier II, Digital Guitar, Les Paul Special
- Mitchel Forman - Fender Rhodes, Yamaha DX7, Yamaha "Blow Torch" Piano on "Clarendon Hills"
- Jonas Hellborg - Fretless Bass Guitar, Fretted bass guitar
- Bill Evans - Tenor Saxophone, Soprano Saxophone, Flute
- Billy Cobham - Drums, Percussion

=== Additional personnel ===
- Danny Gottlieb - Percussion
- Hari Prasad Chaurasia - Flute on "When Blue Turns Gold"
- Zakir Hussain - Tabla on "When Blue Turns Gold"
- Katia Labeque - Synclavier II with Velocity/Pressure Keyboard (VPK), Yamaha DX7, and Acoustic Piano on "When Blue Turns Gold"

== Production ==
- Executive Producer: Albert Koski
- Arranged & Produced By John McLaughlin
- Engineered By Jean Louis Rizet; assisted by Laurent Peyron
- Mixed by Brian Risner & Jean-Louis Riset
