= All Soul (Houston Person album) =

Studio album by Houston Person
- Released: September 27, 2005
- Recorded: June 21, 2005
- Studio: Van Gelder Studio, Englewood Cliffs, NJ
- Genre: Jazz
- Length: 55:21
- Label: HighNote; HCD 7146
- Producer: Houston Person

Houston Person chronology
| You Taught My Heart to Sing (2004) | All Soul (2005) | Just Between Friends (2005) |

All Soul is an album by saxophonist Houston Person which was recorded in 2005 and released on the HighNote label.

== Reception ==
Professional ratings
Review scores
| Source | Rating |
|---|---|
| Allmusic | 3.5/5 stars |
| The Penguin Guide to Jazz Recordings | 3.5/4 stars |

In his review on Allmusic, Tim Sendra states "The Texas tenor is one of the last men standing and 2005's All Soul shows he is standing as tall as ever. His gruff but inviting tone is steady and true, and a quick listen to the first track shows it hasn't dropped off at all ... Person as usual positively bleeds heart and soul on the ballads ... and romps through the up-tempo tracks".

On All About Jazz, Greg Thomas noted "Someone once said that jazz is the sound of surprise. Tenor man Houston Person, best known for his work with the late singer Etta Jones, demonstrates this truism to a tee on All Soul, featuring ten compositions across a spectrum of jazz styles and eras ... By the time you finish listening, you'll be surprised and cheerful too".

In JazzTimes, Owen Cordle wrote: "Person often punctuates his lines with a shout. Sometime he drenches his phrases in blues grease. And sometimes during a ballad a single bent note is all it takes for him to create a feeling of yearning. There’s a vocal quality to his playing, as if he’s singing the melody. All Soul is another good one from a master soul man".

== Track listing ==
All compositions by Houston Person except where noted

1. "Why Not" – 5:59
2. "All Soul" (Curtis Reginald Lewis) – 4:27
3. "Bossa for Baby" (Hank Mobley) – 5:58
4. "Wonderland" (Benny Carter) – 4:28
5. "Let It Be Me" (Gilbert Bécaud, Pierre Delanoë, Manny Curtis) – 5:50
6. "So What" (Miles Davis) – 3:58
7. "Time Stood Still" (Chip White) – 5:23
8. "Two RB's" (Ray Brown) – 5:40
9. "Please Send Me Someone to Love" (Percy Mayfield) – 6:50
10. "Put It Right There" – 6:48

== Personnel ==
- Houston Person – tenor saxophone
- Eddie Allen – trumpet
- Stan Hope – piano
- Randy Johnston – guitar
- Per-Ola Gadd – bass
- Chip White – drums
