= You Taught My Heart to Sing =

Studio album by Houston Person and Bill Charlap
- Released: August 1, 2006
- Recorded: August 4, 2004
- Studio: Van Gelder Studio, Englewood Cliffs, NJ
- Genre: Jazz
- Length: 56:57
- Label: HighNote; HCD 7134
- Producer: Houston Person

Houston Person chronology
| To Etta with Love (2004) | You Taught My Heart to Sing (2006) | All Soul (2005) |

Bill Charlap chronology
| Somewhere: The Songs of Leonard Bernstein (2003) | You Taught My Heart to Sing (2005) | Love Is Here to Stay (2004) |

You Taught My Heart to Sing is an album by saxophonist Houston Person and pianist Bill Charlap recorded in 2004 and released on the HighNote label in 2006.

== Reception ==
Professional ratings
Review scores
| Source | Rating |
|---|---|
| AllMusic | 3.5/5 stars |
| The Penguin Guide to Jazz Recordings | 3/4 stars |

The AllMusic review by Al Campbell said "the mood is relaxed yet not moribund, nor does the duo succumb to adding weepy strings or sappy horn arrangements. Person and Charlap don't break any new ground with this recording; rather they continue to showcase their combined enduring passion for ballads". In JazzTimes, Owen Cordle stated "In another era, this album might have been labeled “mood music.” It consists of tenor saxophonist Person and pianist Charlap in a set of mostly romantic standards. Person is restrained throughout, even when the tempo moves beyond a ballad pace, and Charlap is the ideal, ever-sensitive accompanist. If you appreciate melody, you’ll dig this album".

== Track listing ==
1. "You Taught My Heart to Sing" (McCoy Tyner, Sammy Cahn) – 5:23
2. "Namely You" (Gene de Paul, Johnny Mercer) – 5:29
3. "Where Are You?" (Jimmy McHugh, Harold Adamson) – 5:09
4. "Sweet Lorraine" (Cliff Burwell, Mitchell Parish) – 5:11
5. "If I Ruled the World" (Leslie Bricusse, Cyril Ornadel) – 5:40
6. "'S Wonderful" (George Gershwin, Ira Gershwin) – 5:29
7. "Where Is Love" (Lionel Bart) – 6:40
8. "I Was Telling Her About You" (Moose Charlap, Don George) – 4:27
9. "Don't Forget the Blues" (Ray Brown) – 6:28
10. "I Wonder Where Our Love Has Gone" (Buddy Johnson) – 7:01

== Personnel ==
- Houston Person - tenor saxophone
- Bill Charlap - piano
