= The Kold Kage =

Studio album by Gary Thomas
- Released: 1991
- Recorded: March 26 to June 2, 1991
- Genre: Jazz
- Length: 59:38
- Label: JMT; JMT 849 141
- Producer: Stefan F. Winter

Gary Thomas chronology
While the Gate Is Open (1990)	The Kold Kage (1991)	Till We Have Faces (1992)

The Kold Kage is the fifth album by saxophonist Gary Thomas recorded in 1991 and released on the JMT label.

== Reception ==
The AllMusic review by Thom Jurek states, "Far from academic, this is fire-breathing music, one that forces not only confrontation but, from any open-minded music listener, a reexamination of the jazz terrain as a once, present, and future music."

Professional ratings
Review scores
Source	Rating
AllMusic	3/5 stars
The Penguin Guide to Jazz Recordings	2/4 stars

== Track listing ==
All compositions by Gary Thomas except as indicated

1. "Threshold" - 6:59
2. "Gate of Faces" - 6:57
3. "Intellect" (Gary Thomas, Joe Wesson) - 7:09
4. "Infernal Machine" (Thomas, Wesson) - 6:58
5. "The Divide" - 7:25
6. "Peace of the Korridor" - 6:51
7. "First Strike" (Thomas, Wesson) - 7:18
8. "Beyond the Fall of Night" (Anthony Perkins) - 1:53
9. "The Kold Kage" (Thomas, Wesson) - 7:11
10. "Kulture Bandits (To Be Continued)" (Joe Lee, Gary Thomas) - 1:30

== Personnel ==
- Gary "GTX" Thomas - tenor saxophone, flute, synthesizer, rap vocals
- Joe "BMW" Wesson - rap vocals (tracks 3, 4 & 7)
- Kevin Eubanks (tracks 1, 3 & 6) - guitar
- Paul Bollenback (tracks 2 & 5) - guitar, guitar synthesizer
- Michael Cain (tracks 1 & 6), Tim Murphy (tracks 8 & 9) - piano, synthesizer
- Mulgrew Miller - piano (tracks 2 & 7)
- Anthony Perkins - synthesizer (tracks 8 & 10)
- Anthony Cox - bass
- Dennis Chambers - drums
- Steve Moss - percussion
