= Etta Jones Sings Lady Day =

Studio album by Etta Jones
- Released: October 16, 2001
- Recorded: June 21, 2001
- Studio: M & I Recording Studios, NYC
- Genre: Jazz
- Length: 56:36
- Label: HighNote; HCD 7078
- Producer: Houston Person

Etta Jones chronology
The Way We Were: Live in Concert (2000)	Etta Jones Sings Lady Day (2001)

Etta Jones Sings Lady Day is the final studio album by vocalist Etta Jones, featuring songs associated with Billie Holiday, which was recorded in 2001 and released on the HighNote label.

== Reception ==
Professional ratings
Review scores
Source	Rating
Allmusic	4/5 stars
The Penguin Guide to Jazz Recordings	4/4 stars

In his review on Allmusic, Scott Yanow states "Etta Jones' last 20 years found her recording one consistently soulful jazz album after another, usually with the close partnership of tenor-saxophonist Houston Person. For what would be her final recording, she pays tribute to Billie Holiday with renditions of nine standards. ... The singer passed away on the day that Sings Lady Day was officially released and she sounds in surprisingly good form throughout this set, finishing off her career on top".

== Track listing ==
1. "That Ole Devil Called Love" (Allan Roberts, Doris Fisher) – 5:10
2. "All of Me" (Gerald Marks, Seymour Simons) – 8:24
3. "But Beautiful" (Jimmy Van Heusen, Johnny Burke) – 6:15
4. "You've Changed" (Bill Carey, Carl T. Fischer) – 5:03
5. "I Cried for You" (Arthur Freed, Abe Lyman, Gus Arnheim) – 7:46
6. "Fine and Mellow" (Billie Holiday) – 7:10
7. "God Bless the Child" (Arthur Herzog Jr., Holiday) – 7:16
8. "Them There Eyes" (Maceo Pinkard, Doris Tauber, William Tracey) – 3:55
9. "You Better Go Now" (Irwin Graham, Bickley Reichmer) – 5:37

== Personnel ==
- Etta Jones – vocals
- Houston Person – tenor saxophone
- Richard Wyands – piano
- Peter Bernstein – guitar
- John Webber – bass
- Chip White – drums
