= In a Sentimental Mood (Houston Person album) =

Studio album by Houston Person
- Released: October 3, 2000
- Recorded: January 19, 2000
- Studio: Van Gelder Studio, Englewood Cliffs, NJ
- Genre: Jazz
- Length: 58:15
- Label: HighNote; HCD 7060
- Producer: Houston Person

Houston Person chronology
The Way We Were: Live in Concert (2000)	In a Sentimental Mood (2000)	Together at Christmas (2000)

In a Sentimental Mood is an album by saxophonist Houston Person that was recorded in 2000 and released on the HighNote label.

== Reception ==
Professional ratings
Review scores
Source	Rating
Allmusic	3/5 stars

In his review on Allmusic, Stewart Mason states: "Houston Person is an excellent, underrated tenor saxophonist with a full, rich tone and a knack for well-constructed, tasteful, but never boring solos. That said, he's occasionally guilty of giving the people what they want, releasing smooth and conservative albums that are perfectly enjoyable to listen to, but somewhat beneath what he's capable of. 2000's In a Sentimental Mood is exactly that; this collection of standards features some excellent performances of classic ballads, but it's all so polite that it's hard to see the set as anything more than better-than-average background music. ... there are so few risks taken on In a Sentimental Mood that one doesn't even have to listen to the album; anyone who knows these songs and Houston Person's characteristic sound already knows what this album sounds like. It sounds terrific, but it's hard not to want more."

== Track listing ==
1. "Don't Get Around Much Anymore" (Duke Ellington, Bob Russell) – 4:15
2. "Tenderly" (Walter Gross, Jack Lawrence) – 6:42
3. "Skylark" (Hoagy Carmichael, Johnny Mercer) – 5:40
4. "You Don't Know What Love Is" (Gene de Paul, Don Raye) – 4:34
5. "The Way We Were" (Marvin Hamlisch, Alan Bergman, Marilyn Bergman) – 5:20
6. "My Funny Valentine" (Richard Rodgers, Lorenz Hart) – 5:05
7. "All the Things You Are" (Jerome Kern, Oscar Hammerstein II) – 4:56
8. "Good Morning Heartache" (Irene Higginbotham, Ervin Drake, Dan Fisher) – 5:05
9. "Without a Song" (Vincent Youmans, Billy Rose, Edward Eliscu) – 4:23
10. "In a Sentimental Mood" (Ellington, Manny Kurtz, Irving Mills) – 3:41
11. "Embraceable You" (George Gershwin, Ira Gershwin) – 4:32
12. "'Deed I Do" (Fred Rose, Walter Hirsch) – 4:02

== Personnel ==
- Houston Person – tenor saxophone
- Stan Hope – piano
- George Kaye – bass
- Chip White – drums
