= Loud Jazz =

Studio album by John Scofield
- Released: September 1988
- Recorded: December 1987
- Studio: A&R Recording and Gramavision Studios (New York City, New York)
- Genre: Jazz fusion
- Length: 57:08 (CD); 46:47 (vinyl)
- Label: Gramavision
- Producer: Steve Swallow

John Scofield chronology
Blue Matter (1987)	Loud Jazz (1988)	Pick Hits Live (1990)

Professional ratings
Review scores
Source	Rating
Allmusic	4.5/5 stars
All About Jazz	
The Penguin Guide to Jazz	3/4 stars

Loud Jazz is a studio album by American jazz guitarist John Scofield. It is the second recording to feature bass guitarist Gary Grainger and drummer Dennis Chambers. Also appearing are keyboardist George Duke and percussionist Don Alias.

== Reception ==
AllMusic awarded the album with 4 stars and its review by Scott Yanow states: "The music (which includes such numbers as "Tell You What", "Dirty Rice", "Wabash" and "Spy Vs. Spy") has few memorable melodies but plenty of dynamic playing by Scofield, who at this point was growing as a major stylist from album to the album".

== Track listing ==
All tracks are written by John Scofield except where noted.

No.	Title	Writer(s)	Length
1.	"Tell You What"		3:46
2.	"Dance Me Home"		5:55
3.	"Signature of Venus"		4:42
4.	"Dirty Rice"		6:34
5.	"Did It"		5:38
6.	"Wabash"		4:33
7.	"Loud Jazz"		6:06
8.	"Otay" (CD only)	John Scofield, Robert Aries, Dennis Chambers, Gary Grainger	6:14
9.	"True Love"		3:54
10.	"Igetthepicture" (CD only)		4:07
11.	"Spy vs. Spy"		6:16

== Personnel ==
- John Scofield – guitar
- Robert Aries – keyboards
- George Duke – keyboard solos (1, 2, 4–6)
- Gary Grainger – bass guitar
- Dennis Chambers – drums
- Don Alias – percussion

=== Production ===
- Jonathan F. P. Rose – executive producer
- Steve Swallow – producer
- Jon Ferla – recording, mixing
- Bob Ludwig – mastering at Masterdisk (New York, NY)
- Ivan Chermayeff – cover art, design
- Tom Geismar – design
- Waring Abbott – portrait photography
