= Mitchel Forman =

American jazz keyboardist

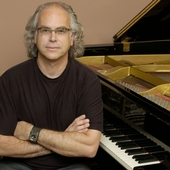

Background information
- Born: January 24, 1956 (age 70); Brooklyn, New York
- Genres: Jazz
- Occupation: Musician
- Instrument: Keyboards
- Website: mitchelforman.com

Mitchel Forman (born January 24, 1956) is an American jazz and fusion keyboard player.

== Biography and music career ==
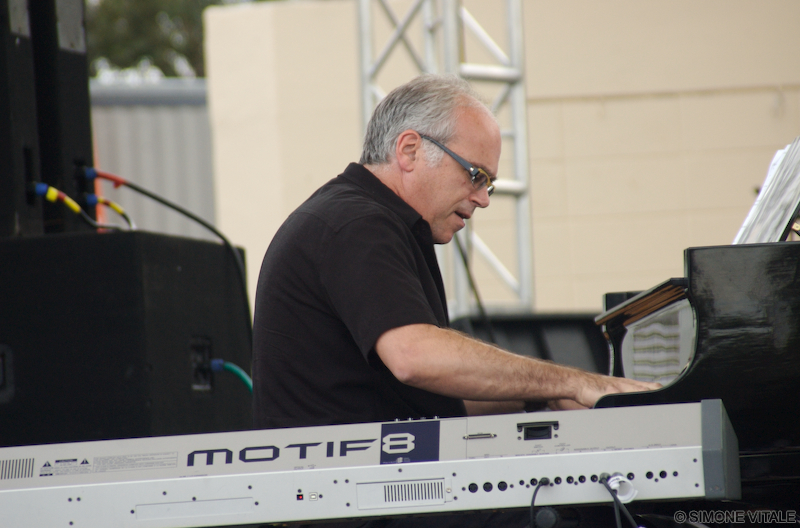
Forman in 2007

Mitchel Forman began studying classical piano at the age of seven. At 17 he entered the Manhattan School of Music (MSM) for three years of study and began working with bands in New York. Shortly after graduating from MSM he began touring and recording with Gerry Mulligan, playing in both Mulligan's big band and quartet, and work with Stan Getz followed. In 1980 Forman's solo career began with a piano performance at the Newport Jazz Festival. This recording became his first album, Live at Newport. In subsequent years he worked on the road with Phil Woods, Carla Bley, Mel Tormé, and Astrud Gilberto. Forman also recorded two solo piano albums for Soul Note and toured in Europe regularly. He joined guitarist John McLaughlin for a year and a half on the road, recording and contributing to two of the band's recordings - the seminal Mahavishnu and Adventures in Radioland. Forman then joined ex-Weather Report saxophonist Wayne Shorter, touring, recording and contributing to Shorter's Phantom Navigator.

In 1985, Forman began leading his own band and recorded his group debut for Magenta Records (a division of Windham Hill), Train of Thought. At the same time he continued to work with other well-known jazz and music figures, including guitarist John Scofield (Blue Matter), Mike Stern ("Upside Downside"), Janis Siegel of The Manhattan Transfer, Dave Samuels, Diane Schuur, Gary Burton (Reunion), Pat Metheny, Simon Phillips, Jimmy Earl, Freddie Hubbard, saxophonist Bill Evans and Rickie Lee Jones. Forman's 1992 tribute to the late pianist Bill Evans, Now & Then, was particularly well regarded. Most of Forman's recordings are of the fusion or jazz genre, however, 1998's Harvest Song features 15 solo piano tracks.

Forman started the record label Marsis Jazz. He has led the band Metro with guitarist Chuck Loeb, has toured in a quartet with Wolfgang Haffner, been a member of the Rick Braun band, a member of BWB band, and has been featured on albums by Jeff Golub.

Forman has cited as influences Oscar Peterson, Bill Evans, McCoy Tyner, Herbie Hancock, Keith Jarrett and Chick Corea.

== Discography ==
=== As leader ===
- Childhood Dreams (Soul Note, 1982)
- Only a Memory (Soul Note, 1983)
- Train of Thought (Magenta, 1985)
- What Else? (RCA, 1992)
- Hand Made (Lipstick, 1993)
- Now and Then (BMG/Novus 1993)
- Harvest Song (Jazzline, 1997)
- New Standards (UnReel, 1999)
- Patience (Skip, 2001)
- Mr. Clean: Live at the Baked Potato (Skip, 2002)
- Perspectives (Marsis, 2006)
- Lost and Found (Marsis, 2010)

With Metro

- Metro (Lipstick, 1994)
- Tree People (Lipstick, 1995)
- Metrocafe (Hip Bop, 2000)
- Grapevine (Silva Screen/Hip Bop, 2002)
- Live at the A-Trane (Marsis, 2004)
- Express (Marsis, 2007)
- Big Band Boom (Jazzline, 2015)

=== As sideman ===
With Bill Evans

- Living in the Crest of a Wave (Elektra Musician, 1984)
- The Alternative Man (Blue Note, 1985)
- The Gambler (Jazz City 1990)

With Brian Bromberg

- It's About Time (Nova, 1991)
- Brian Bromberg (Nova, 1993)
- You Know That Feeling (Zebra, 1998)
- Compared to That (Artistry Music, 2012)

With Rick Braun

- Full Stride (Atlantic, 1998)
- Kisses in the Rain (Warner Bros., 2001)
- Esperanto (Warner Bros., 2003)
- Yours Truly (Artizen, 2005)
- Sessions Vol. 1 (Artizen, 2006)

With Mark Egan

- Mosaic (Hip Pocket, 1985)
- Truth Be Told (Wavetone, 2010)
- About Now (Wavetone, 2014)
- Direction Home (Wavetone, 2015)

With Jeff Golub

- Nightlife (Bluemoon, 1997)
- Dangerous Curves (GRP, 2000)
- Grand Central (Narada, 2007)

With Chuck Loeb

- Mediterranean (DMP, 1993)
- The Music Inside (Shanachie, 1996)
- The Moon, the Stars, and the Setting Sun (Shanachie, 1998)
- Presence (Heads Up, 2007)
- Silhouette (Shanachie, 2013)
- Unspoken (Shanachie, 2016)

With others

- Jeff Beal, Perpetual Motion (Island, 1989)
- Joe Beck, Back to Beck (DMP, 1988)
- Randy Bernsen, Paradise Citizens (Zebra, 1988)
- Bill Berry, Awkward Stage (Songwriter's Square, 2016)
- Bob Boykin, Hazardous Material (Legato, 1996)
- Till Bronner, The Movie Album (Verve, 2014)
- Gary Burton, Reunion (GRP, 1990)
- Terri Lyne Carrington, More to Say (E1, 2009)
- Sandeep Chowta, Matters of the Heart (Sony, 2013)
- Doky Brothers, 2 (Blue Note, 1997)
- Thomas Dolby, The Gate to the Mind's Eye (Giant, 1994)
- Jimmy Earl, Jimmy Earl (Legato, 1995)
- Jimmy Earl, Stratosphere (Pacific Time 1999)
- Richard Elliot, Jumpin' Off (Metro Blue, 1997)
- Richard Elliot, Chill Factor (Capitol, 1999)
- David Foster, River of Love (Atlantic, 1990)
- Fourplay, Silver (Heads Up, 2015)
- Stan Getz, Billy Highstreet Samba (EmArcy, 1990)
- Danny Gottlieb, Aquamarine (Atlantic, 1987)
- Danny Gottlieb, Whirlwind (Atlantic, 1989)
- Charles Gross, Punchline (A&M, 1988)
- Charles Gross, A Family Thing (Cinerama, 1996)
- Jonas Hellborg, Axis (Day Eight Music, 1986)
- Enrique Iglesias, Vivir (FonoVisa/Strauss 1997)
- Anthony Jackson, Interspirit (Abstract Logix, 2010)
- Alphonso Johnson, Metaphors (Embamba Music, 2017)
- Bobby Kimball, We're Not in Kansas Anymore (Inakustik, 2016)
- Kathy Kosins, Uncovered Soul (Maristar, 2018)
- Kevyn Lettau, Universal Language (JVC, 1995)
- Bob Leatherbarrow, Bumpin' in the Basement (Cherimoya/Chartmaker 1998)
- John McLaughlin, Mahavishnu (Warner Bros., 1984)
- John McLaughlin, Adventures in Radioland (Relativity, 1986)
- Mike Miller, Save the Moon (Marsis, 2001)
- Wendy Moten, Timeless (Woodward Avenue 2014)
- Gerry Mulligan, Walk on the Water (DRG, 1980)
- Najee, Just an Illusion (EMI, 1992)
- Billy Ocean, Tear Down These Walls (Jive, 1988)
- Petite Blonde, Petite Blonde (Lipstick, 1992)
- Simon Phillips, Symbiosis (Lipstick, 1995)
- Dave Samuels, Living Colors (MCA, 1988)
- Diane Schuur, Talkin' 'Bout You (GRP, 1988)
- John Scofield, Blue Matter (Gramavision, 1987)
- Tom Scott, Smokin' Section (Windham Hill, 1999)
- James Senese, Passpartu (Itwhy, 2003)
- Cosy Sheridan, Grand Design (Bonneville, 1998)
- Wayne Shorter, Phantom Navigator (Columbia, 1987)
- Janis Siegel, At Home (Atlantic, 1987)
- Chris Standring, Sunlight (Ultimate Vibe, 2018)
- Tommy Smith, Step by Step (Blue Note, 1988)
- Steps Ahead, Magnetic (Elektra 1986)
- Mike Stern, Upside Downside (Atlantic, 1986)
- Curtis Stigers, Time Was (Arista, 1995)
- Andy Summers, World Gone Strange (Private Music, 1991)
- Andy Summers, Synaesthesia (CMP, 1995)
- Mel Torme, Gerry Mulligan, George Shearing, The Classic Concert Live (Concord Jazz, 2005)
- Frankie Valli, ...Is the Word (Warner Bros., 1978)
- Dave Valentin, Light Struck (GRP, 1986)
- Carl Verheyen, Mustang Run (Cranktone, 2013)
- Georg Wadenius, Cleo (Four Leaf Clover 1987)
- Peter White, Glow (Columbia, 2001)
