= Chip White =

American musician (1946–2020)

Alan White
- Born: 21 December 1946
- Died: 5 August 2020 (aged 73) New York City

Alan White (21 December 1946 – 5 August 2020), known as Chip White, was an American jazz drummer who has performed and/or recorded with a variety of artists, including Carmen McRae, Jaki Byard, the Jazzmobile CETA Big Band, Candido, John Abercrombie, Frank Wess, and many others.

White died on August 5, 2020, in Harlem, New York City.

== Early life ==
White was born on December 21, 1946, in New York City to Algernon White and Norma White. He began studying percussion and music with his father at the age of nine and studied theory and harmony with Vincent Corzine while in high school. White then continued his formal education at Ithaca College and later at the Berklee School of Music in Boston, MA, where he studied with Alan Dawson, Charlie Marino, and Herb Pomeroy. He also studied privately with Freddie Buda of the Boston Symphony. Later, he studied orchestration and arranging with Frank Foster.

== Discography ==
- Harlem Sunset (Postcards, 1994)
- Music and Lyrics (Dark Colors, 2004)
- Double Dedication (Dark Colors, 2008)
- More Dedications (Dark Colors, 2009)
- Personal Dedications & Percussive Tributes (Dark Colors, 2011)
- Family Dedications and More (Dark Colors, 2014)

=== As sideman ===
With Teddy Edwards

- Midnight Creeper (HighNote, 1997)
- Ladies Man (HighNote, 2000)
- Smooth Sailing (HighNote, 2001 [2003])

With Etta Jones

- Easy Living (HighNote, 2000)
- The Way We Were: Live in Concert (Highnote, 2000 [2011]) with Houston Person
- Etta Jones Sings Lady Day (HighNote, 2001)

With Houston Person

- Christmas with Houston Person and Friends (Muse, 1994)
- In a Sentimental Mood (HighNote, 2000)
- Social Call (HighNote, 2003)
- To Etta with Love (HighNote, 2004)
- All Soul (HighNote, 2005)

With Enrico Rava

- Il Giro Del Giorno in 80 Mondi (International, 1972)

With Irene Reid

- One Monkey Don't Stop No Show (Savant, 2002)

With Tom Waits

- Blue Valentine (Asylum, 1978)
