= The Heart of Things: Live in Paris =

Live album by John McLaughlin
- Released: 3 October 2000
- Recorded: 4–5 November 1998
- Genre: Jazz
- Length: 47:22
- Label: PolyGram
- Producer: John McLaughlin

John McLaughlin chronology
Remember Shakti: The Believer [Live] (2000)	The Heart of Things: Live in Paris (2000)	Saturday Night in Bombay: Remember Shakti (2001)

Professional ratings
Review scores
Source	Rating
All About Jazz	(favorable)
AllMusic	4/5 stars
The Penguin Guide to Jazz Recordings	4/4 stars

The Heart of Things: Live in Paris is a live album by John McLaughlin, released in 2000 through the record label PolyGram. The album reached number 25 on Billboard's Top Jazz Albums chart.

== Track listing ==
All tracks composed by John McLaughlin; except where indicated

1. "Seven Sisters" – 8:30
2. "Mother Tongues" – 12:57
3. "Fallen Angels" – 10:33
4. "Divide" (Gary Thomas) – 16:41
5. "Tony" – 13:56
6. "Acid Jazz" – 14:53

== Personnel ==
Musicians

- Dennis Chambers – drums
- Matthew Garrison – bass guitar
- John McLaughlin – electric guitar
- Otmaro Ruíz – keyboards
- Gary Thomas – soprano sax, tenor sax
- Victor Williams – percussion

Production

- Jean-Philippe Allard – executive producer
- Alain Frappier – graphic design
- Philippe Gaillot – engineer
- Lïla Guilloteau – assistant production coordination
- Sven Hoffman – house sound, technical assistance
- Vincent Lignier – photography
- Denis Majorrell – cover photo
- John McLaughlin – producer, technical assistance
- Maureen Murphy – release coordinator
- John Newcott – release coordinator
- Christian Pégand – production consultant
- Daniel Richard – executive producer
- Christian Struwe – monitor engineer

== Chart performance ==
Year	Chart	Position
2000	Billboard Top Jazz Albums	25
