= Still Warm =

Studio album by John Scofield
- Released: June 1986 (US)(LP); October 25, 1990 (US)(CD)
- Recorded: June 1985
- Studio: Mediasound and Gramavision Studios (New York City, New York); Minot Sound (White Plains, New York)
- Genre: Jazz fusion
- Length: 42:11
- Label: Gramavision
- Producer: Steve Swallow

John Scofield chronology
Solar (1984)	Still Warm (1986)	Blue Matter (1987)

Professional ratings
Review scores
Source	Rating
AllMusic	3/5 stars
The Encyclopedia of Popular Music	5/5 stars
The Penguin Guide to Jazz Recordings	4/4 stars

Still Warm is a studio album by jazz guitarist John Scofield. It features keyboardist Don Grolnick, bass guitarist Darryl Jones and drummer Omar Hakim.

The album was his second for Gramavision and was recorded right after leaving Miles Davis's band. He used two musicians from the Davis group, Jones and Hakim, both of whom had also recently recorded and toured with Sting. The album was critically acclaimed, though The Penguin Jazz Guide notes that "even some Scofield devotees seem unpersuaded of its considerable merits".

The album is ranked number 998 in All-Time Top 1000 Albums (3rd edition, 2000).

== Track listing ==
All tracks are written by John Scofield.

No.	Title	Length
1.	"Techno"	7:29
2.	"Still Warm"	6:00
3.	"High and Mighty"	5:14
4.	"Protocol"	3:20
5.	"Rule of Thumb"	7:22
6.	"Picks and Pans"	5:23
7.	"Gil B643"	6:41

== Personnel ==
- John Scofield – guitar
- Don Grolnick – keyboards
- Darryl Jones – bass guitar
- Omar Hakim – drums, electronic percussion

=== Production ===
- Jonathan F. P. Rose – executive producer
- Steve Swallow – producer
- Alec Head – engineer, mixing
- Alex Haas – assistant engineer
- Wayne Warnecke – assistant engineer
- Bob Ludwig – mastering at Masterdisk (New York, NY)
- Tom Finch – production coordinator
- Larry Kazal – art direction, design
- Michael Tighe – photography
