= Together at Christmas (Etta Jones and Houston Person album) =

Studio album by Etta Jones and Houston Person
- Released: August 15, 2000
- Recorded: March 24, 2000
- Studio: M & I Recording Studios, NYC
- Genre: Jazz
- Length: 54:07
- Label: Highnote; HCD 7058
- Producer: Houston Person

Etta Jones chronology
| Easy Living (2000) | Together at Christmas (2000) | The Way We Were: Live in Concert (2000) |

Houston Person chronology
| Soft Lights (1999) | Together at Christmas (2000) | The Way We Were: Live in Concert (2000) |

Professional ratings
Review scores
| Source | Rating |
|---|---|
| The Penguin Guide to Jazz Recordings | 3/4 stars |

Together at Christmas is a Christmas album by vocalist Etta Jones and saxophonist Houston Person which was recorded in 2000 and released on the Highnote label.

== Track listing ==
1. "Frosty the Snowman" (Jack Rollins, Steve Nelson) – 5:07
2. "Have Yourself a Merry Little Christmas" (Hugh Martin, Ralph Blane) – 5:54
3. "Jingle Bells" (James Pierpont) – 5:02
4. "I'll Be Home for Christmas" (Walter Kent, Kim Gannon, Buck Ram) – 3:27
5. "Winter Wonderland" (Felix Bernard, Richard B. Smith) – 4:42
6. "Silent Night" (Franz Xaver Gruber, Joseph Mohr) – 3:32
7. "Let It Snow! Let It Snow! Let It Snow!" (Jule Styne, Sammy Cahn) – 3:53
8. "What Are You Doing New Year's Eve?" (Frank Loesser) – 6:17
9. "Santa Claus Is Coming to Town" (J. Fred Coots, Haven Gillespie) – 3:07
10. "White Christmas" (Irving Berlin) – 4:20
11. "The Christmas Waltz" (Styne, Cahn) – 4:27
12. "The Christmas Song" (Robert Wells, Mel Tormé) – 4:19

== Personnel ==
- Etta Jones – vocals
- Houston Person – tenor saxophone
- Stan Hope – piano
- George Kaye – bass
- Chip White – drums
