= Stolen Sweets =

Studio album by Houston Person
- Released: 1977
- Recorded: 1976
- Genre: Jazz
- Length: 37:59
- Label: Muse; MR 5110

Houston Person chronology
Get Outa My Way (1975)	Stolen Sweets (1977)	Wild Flower (1977)

Professional ratings
Review scores
Source	Rating
Allmusic	4.5/5 stars

Stolen Sweets is an album by saxophonist Houston Person recorded in 1976 and released on the Muse label.

== Reception ==
Allmusic awarded the album 4½ stars calling it "First-rate soul jazz, funk, blues, and ballads".

== Track listing ==
1. "If Ever I Would Leave You" (Alan Jay Lerner, Frederick Loewe) – 10:38
2. "At Last" (Mack Gordon, Harry Warren) – 7:42
3. "Stolen Sweets" (Wild Bill Davis) – 5:35
4. "Skylark" (Johnny Mercer, Hoagy Carmichael) – 7:32
5. "T-Bone Steak" (Jimmy Smith) – 6:32

== Personnel ==
- Houston Person – tenor saxophone
- Jimmy Ponder – guitar
- Sonny Phillips – organ
- Frankie Jones – drums
- Buddy Caldwell – congas
