= While the Gate Is Open =

Studio album by Gary Thomas
- Released: 1990
- Recorded: May 1990
- Studios: Hit Factory, New York City
- Genre: Jazz
- Length: 59:06
- Labels: JMT; JMT 834 439
- Producer: Stefan Winter

Gary Thomas chronology
By Any Means Necessary (1989)	While the Gate Is Open (1990)	The Kold Kage (1991)

While the Gate Is Open is the fourth album by saxophonist Gary Thomas which was recorded in 1990 and released on the JMT label. It features Thomas' interpretations of eight jazz standards.

== Reception ==
Professional ratings
Review scores
Source	Rating
AllMusic	4/5 stars
The Guardian	3/5 stars
The Penguin Guide to Jazz Recordings	3/4 stars

The AllMusic review by Scott Yanow states, "Thomas gives the eight tunes fresh treatments and as usual avoids all clichés (and the logic of bop) in his explorative improvisations." The Guardian's John Fordham noted "This one features the hard-nosed Miles Davis saxophonist Gary Thomas with a fiercely collaborative band of experts... There's a lot of full-on tenor sax blasting over ferocious percussion barrages... The saxophonist's tendency to spit out phrases rather than massage them into life gives his work a rather impassive quality that mellowed later".

== Track listing ==
1. "Strode Rode" (Sonny Rollins) - 8:06
2. "Star Eyes" (Gene de Paul, Don Raye) - 7:27
3. "You Stepped Out of a Dream" (Nacio Herb Brown, Gus Kahn) - 7:58
4. "The Song Is You" (Oscar Hammerstein II, Jerome Kern) - 7:31
5. "Invitation" (Bronisław Kaper, Paul Francis Webster) - 10:00
6. "Chelsea Bridge" (Billy Strayhorn) - 5:38
7. "On the Trail" (Ferde Grofé) - 6:47
8. "Epistrophy" (Thelonious Monk, Kenny Clarke) - 5:39

== Personnel ==
- Gary Thomas - tenor saxophone, flute
- Kevin Eubanks - electric guitar (tracks 1, 5, 6 & 8)
- Renee Rosnes - synthesizer, piano (tracks 2, 3 & 8)
- Anthony Cox (tracks 4, 5, 7 & 8), Dave Holland (tracks 1–3 & 6) - bass
- Dennis Chambers - drums (tracks 1–5, 7 & 8)
