= Bill Evans (saxophonist) =

American jazz saxophonist (born 1958)

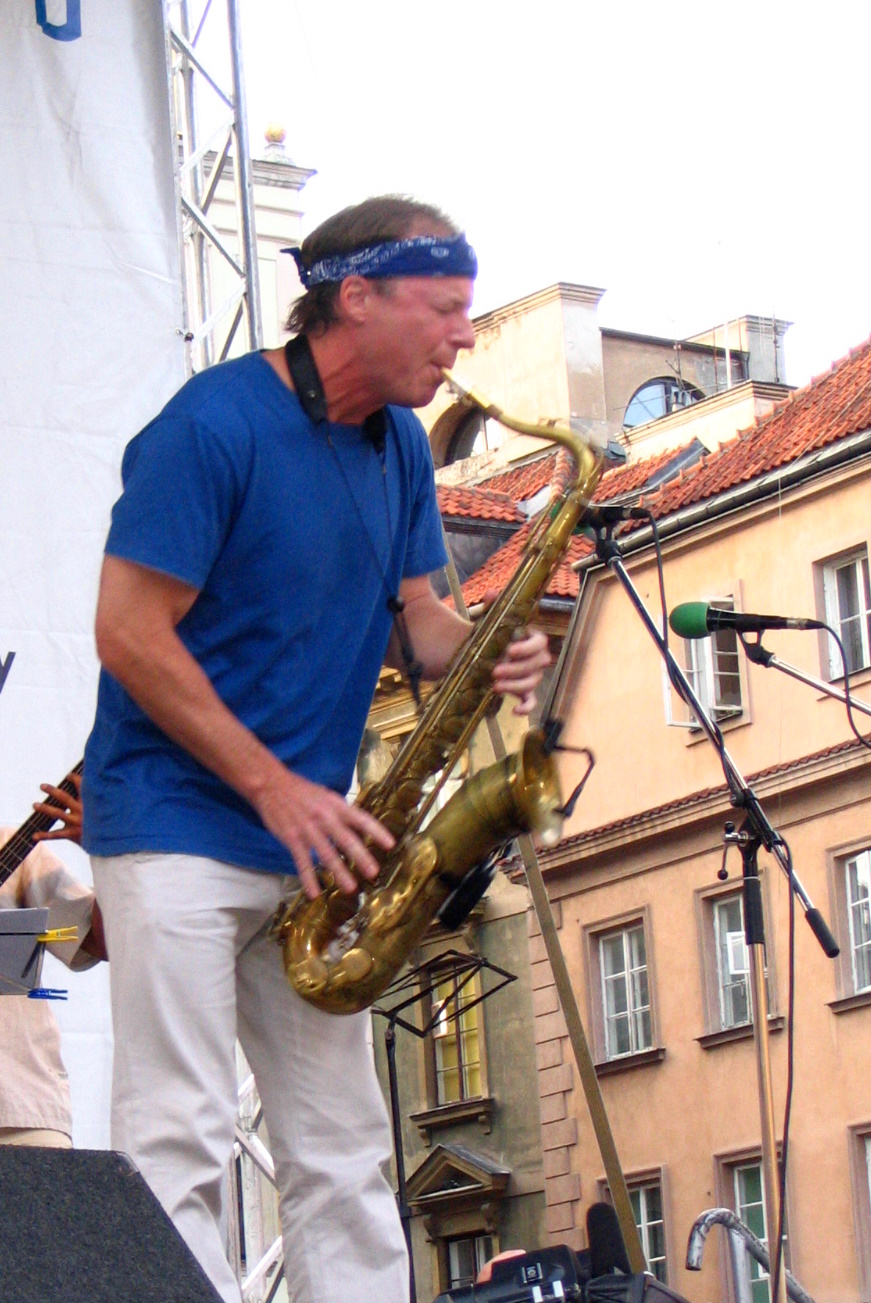
- Evans in Warsaw, Poland, July 24, 2004

Background information
- Born: William D. Evans; February 9, 1958 (age 68); Clarendon Hills, Illinois, U.S.
- Genres: Jazz, jazz fusion, bluegrass
- Occupation: Musician
- Instruments: Tenor saxophone, soprano saxophone
- Years active: 1979–present
- Labels: Elektra/Musician, Blue Note, Jazz City, Lipstick, ESC, BHM, Vansman
- Website: www.billevanssax.com

William D. Evans (born February 9, 1958) is an American jazz saxophonist, who was a member of the Miles Davis group in the 1980s and has since led several of his own bands, including Push and Soulgrass. Evans plays tenor and soprano saxophones. He has recorded over 27 solo albums and received two Grammy Award nominations. He recorded an album called Bill Evans – Vans Joint with the WDR Big Band in 2009.

He has played a variety of music with his solo projects, including bluegrass, jazz, and funk. His early influences on saxophone were Sonny Rollins, Joe Henderson, John Coltrane, Stan Getz, Steve Grossman, and Dave Liebman.

== Biography ==
Evans was born in Clarendon Hills, Illinois, United States. His father was a classical piano prodigy and until junior high school Evans studied classical piano. He attended Hinsdale Central High School and studied with Bunky Green and Joe Daly in Chicago while attending high school. Early in his studies he was able to hear such artists as Sonny Stitt and Stan Getz at the Jazz Showcase in Chicago.

Evans attended University of North Texas and William Paterson University, where he studied with Dave Liebman, an alumnus of trumpeter Miles Davis's early 1970s bands. Moving to New York city in 1979, he spent hours in lofts playing jazz standards and perfecting his improvisational style.

At the age of 22, he joined Miles Davis and was part of his comeback in the early to mid–1980s. He was instrumental in helping Davis put the group together, bringing in Mike Stern, Marcus Miller and John Scofield. Notable albums recorded with Davis include The Man With The Horn, We Want Miles, Star People, and Decoy. Evans is unrelated to pianist Bill Evans (1929–1980), who played with Davis in the 1950s.

He has played, toured and recorded with artists such as Herbie Hancock, John McLaughlin, Michael Franks, Willie Nelson, Mick Jagger, Les McCann, Mark Egan, Danny Gottlieb, Randy Brecker, The Allman Brothers Band, and Medeski Martin & Wood. He is the leader of Petite Blonde album with Victor Bailey, Dennis Chambers, Mitch Forman, and Chuck Loeb.

He joined the reformed Mahavishnu Orchestra in 1984 and performed with them until they broke up in 1987. Beginning in 1990 he toured with his own band.

Two of his albums, Soul Insider and Soulgrass, were nominated for a Grammy Award. Soulgrass was combination of bluegrass and jazz fusion that featured Béla Fleck, Sam Bush, Bruce Hornsby, and Vinnie Colaiuta.

== Discography ==
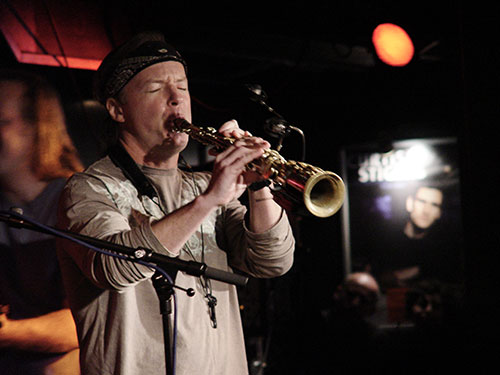
Bill Evans in Berlin

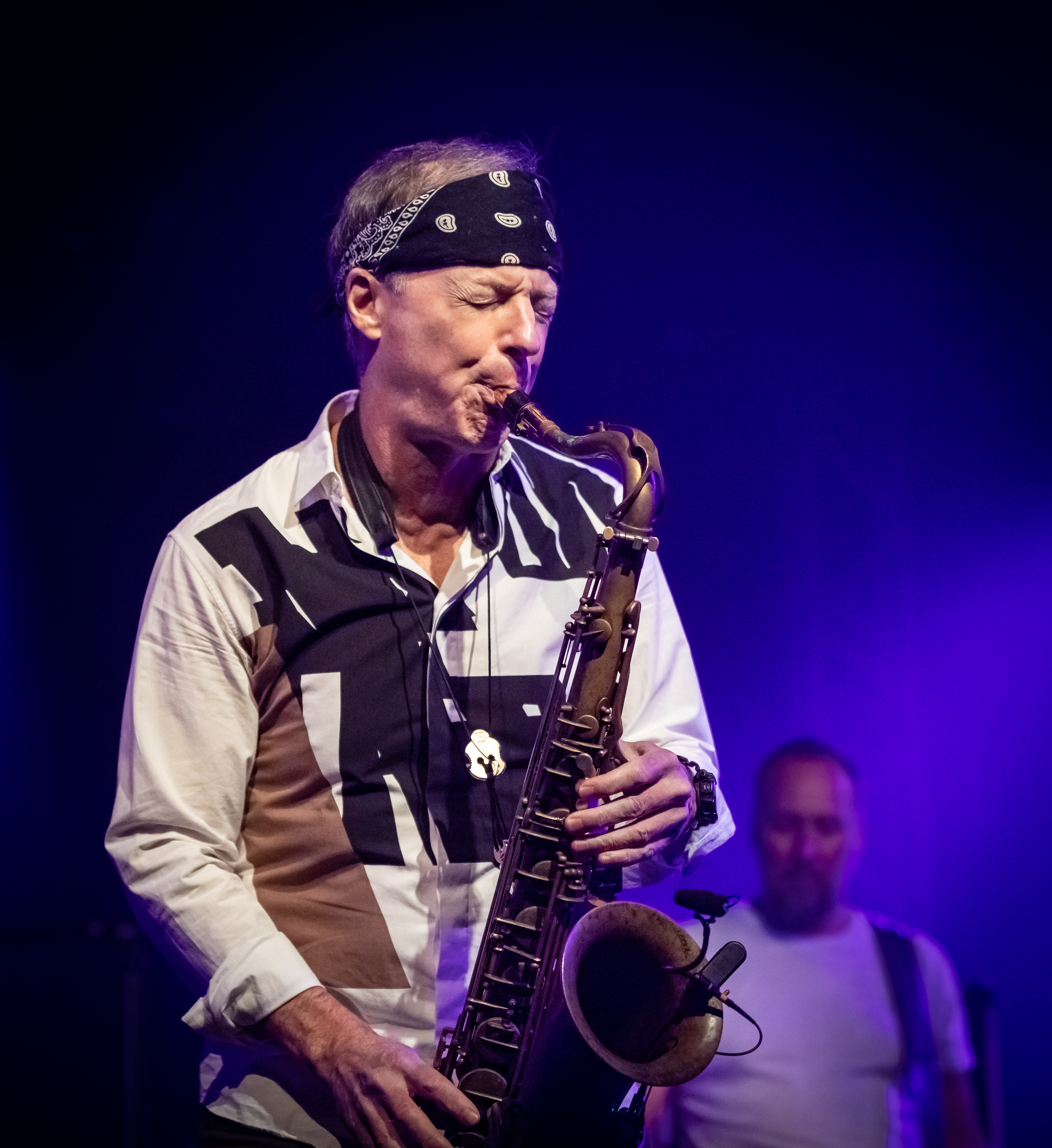
Bill Evans live @ Leverkusener Jazztage 2019

=== As leader ===
Recording date	Title	Label	Year released	Notes
1983–11	Living in the Crest of a Wave	Elektra Musician	1984	
1985–01, 1985–05	The Alternative Man	Blue Note	1985	
1989–02	Summertime	Jazz City	1989	
1989–09	Let the Juice Loose: Bill Evans Group Live at Blue Note Tokyo]	Jazz City	1990	Live at Blue Note Tokyo
1990–09	The Gambler: Bill Evans Live At Blue Note Tokyo 2	Jazz City	1990	Live at Blue Note Tokyo
1993	Push	Lipstick	1994	
1994–04, 1994–11	Live in Europe	Lipstick	1995	Live
1995–12 – 1996–01	Escape	Escapade	1996	
1997–05 – 1997–06	Starfish & The Moon	Escapade	1997	
1998–11 – 1998–12	Touch	ESC	1999	
2000–05 – 2000–06	Soul Insider	ESC	2000	featuring Les McCann, Ricky Peterson, Dean Brown, John Scofield, James Genus, Tim Lefebvre, Steve Jordan, Don Alias, Vaneese Thomas, Lew Soloff, Conrad Herwig
2001 – 2002	Big Fun	ESC	2002	
2004–10 – 2005–01	Soulgrass	BHM	2005	
2007–05 – 2007–08	The Other Side of Something	Intuition	2007	
2008–02	Vans Joint	BHM	2008	Live with Dave Weckl, Mark Egan, WDR Big Band
2011–02	The East End	Jazzline	2019	featuring Etienne Mbappe, Wolfgang Haffner, WDR Big Band
2011–04 – 2011–06	Dragonfly	Vansman	2012	
2013–10 – 2013–11	Soulgrass Live in Moscow	Vansman	2014	Live
2016?	Rise Above	Vansman	2016	
2018–10	Live Down Under	Vansman	2019	Live featuring The Spykillers, Wolfgang Haffner, Simon Oslender, Gary Grainger
2024?	Who I Am	Vansman	2024	featuring Béla Fleck, Jerry Douglas, Max Mutzke, Victor Wooten, Till Brönner, Nils Landgren, Wolfgang Haffner

=== Collaborations ===
With Hank Jones and Red Mitchell

- Moods Unlimited (Paddle Wheel, 1983) – rec. 1982

With Randy Brecker, Robben Ford and Tom Scott

- Echoes of Ellington Vol. 1 (Verve, 1987)
- Echoes of Ellington Vol. 2 (Verve, 1988)

With Randy Brecker

- Soul Bop Band Live (BHM, 2005) – live rec. 2004

With Robben Ford

- The Sun Room (Ear, 2019)
- Common Ground (13J Productions, 2020)

With Victor Bailey, Dennis Chambers, Mitch Forman and Chuck Loeb

- Petite Blonde (Lipstick, 1992) – live

With Andy LaVerne, John Patitucci and Steve Davis

- Modern Days and Nights: Music of Cole Porter (Double-Time, 1997) – rec. 1996

=== As a member ===
Elements

- Elements (Philo, 1982)
- Forward Motion (Antilles, 1984)
- Blown Away (Passport, 1986)
- Illumination (Novus, 1988)
- Liberal Arts (RCA, 1989)
- Spirit River (RCA, 1990)

Steps Ahead

- Steppin' Out with WDR Big Band (Jazzline, 2016)

=== As sideman ===
With Victor Bailey

- Bottom's Up (Atlantic, 1989)
- Low Blow (ESC, 1999)
- That's Right (ESC, 2001)

With Miles Davis

- The Man with the Horn (Columbia, 1981)
- We Want Miles (Columbia, 1982)
- Star People (Columbia, 1983)
- Decoy (Columbia, 1984)

With Mark Egan

- A Touch of Light (GRP, 1988)
- Beyond Words (Bluemoon, 1991)
- Freedom Town (Wavetone, 2001)
- Truth Be Told (Wavetone, 2010)

With Michael Franks

- Skin Dive (Warner Bros., 1985)
- The Camera Never Lies (Warner Bros., 1987)

With Jeff Golub

- Unspoken Words (Gaia, 1988)
- Avenue Blue Featuring Jeff Golub (Bluemoon, 1994)
- Nightlife (Bluemoon, 1997)

With Danny Gottlieb

- Aquamarine (Atlantic, 1987)
- Whirlwind (Atlantic, 1989)

With Chuck Loeb

- Life Colors (DMP, 1990)
- Mediterranean (DMP, 1993)

With Mandoki Soulmates

- People in Room No. 8 (PolyGram, 1997)
- Out of Key with the Time (Sony, 2002)
- Soulmates (Paroli, 2002)
- Aquarelle (Neo, 2009)

With Lee Ritenour

- Alive in L.A. (GRP, 1997)
- This Is Love (i.e. Music, 1998)

With Aziza Mustafa Zadeh

- Dance of Fire (Columbia, 1995)
- Inspiration (Columbia, 2000)

With others

- Mahavishnu (John McLaughlin), Mahavishnu (Warner, 1984)
- Andy Summers, Charming Snakes (Private Music, 1990)
- Gianfranco Continenza, The Past Inside The Present (ESC, 2007)
- Wolfgang Haffner, Dream Band Live In Concert (ACT, 2022)
