= Blue Matter (John Scofield album) =

Studio album by John Scofield
- Released: 1987
- Recorded: September 1986
- Studio: Mediasound, New York City; Gramavision, New York City
- Genre: Jazz fusion
- Length: 42:37
- Label: Gramavision
- Producer: Steve Swallow

John Scofield chronology
Still Warm (1986)	Blue Matter (1987)	Loud Jazz (1988)

Professional ratings
Review scores
Source	Rating
AllMusic	4/5 stars
The Penguin Guide to Jazz	3/4 stars

Blue Matter is a studio album by jazz guitarist John Scofield, released in 1986. It is the first of three recordings featuring Gary Grainger on bass guitar and Dennis Chambers on drums. The keyboards are played by Mitchel Forman with Don Alias providing percussion. Hiram Bullock is featured as second guitarist on three tracks.

== Reception ==
AllMusic awarded the album with 4 stars and its review by Scott Yanow states: "One of the top jazz guitarists from the mid-1980s on, John Scofield has always had a very recognizable sound and the ability to combine together R&B/funk with advanced jazz".

== Track listing ==
All tracks written by John Scofield

1. "Blue Matter" – 5:47
2. "Trim" – 7:33
3. "Heaven Hill" – 4:28
4. "So You Say" – 4:34
5. "Now She's Blonde" – 5:32
6. "Make Me" – 2:53
7. "The Nag" – 4:18
8. "Time Marches On" – 7:32

== Personnel ==
- John Scofield – guitar
- Mitchel Forman – keyboards
- Hiram Bullock – rhythm guitar (1, 5, 6)
- Gary Grainger – bass guitar
- Dennis Chambers – drums
- Don Alias – percussion

=== Production ===
- Jonathan F. P. Rose – executive producer
- Steve Swallow – producer
- Joe Ferla – recording, mixing
- Andy Cardenas – assistant engineer
- Bob Ludwig – mastering at Masterdisk (New York, NY)
- Ivan Chermayeff and Tom Geismar, Chermayeff & Geismar – cover art, design
- Andy Freeberg – back cover photography
