= By Any Means Necessary (Gary Thomas album) =

Studio album by Gary Thomas & Seventh Quadrant
- Released: 1989
- Recorded: May 1989
- Studio: RPM Sound Studios, New York City
- Genre: Jazz
- Length: 53:58
- Label: JMT; JMT 834 432
- Producer: Stefan F. Winter

Gary Thomas chronology
Code Violations (1988)	By Any Means Necessary (1989)	While the Gate Is Open (1990)

By Any Means Necessary is the third album by saxophonist Gary Thomas recorded in 1989 and released on the JMT label.

== Reception ==
The AllMusic review by Scott Yanow states, "The music features dense ensembles, simultaneous improvisations, eccentric funk rhythms, and rhythmic but very dissonant horn solos that have a logic of their own. One can think of this noisy date as being an updated extension of Ornette Coleman's Prime Time and is recommended to open-minded listeners who think that nothing new has been played in jazz since the mid-'70s."

Professional ratings
Review scores
Source	Rating
AllMusic	4/5 stars
The Penguin Guide to Jazz Recordings	3/4 stars

== Track listing ==
All compositions by Gary Thomas except as indicated

1. "By Any Means Necessary" - 7:44
2. "Continuum" - 6:52
3. "You're Under Arrest" (John Scofield) - 7:17
4. "Potential Hazard" - 6:23
5. "To the Vanishing Point" - 4:37
6. "Screen Gem" - 5:02
7. "Janala" (Geri Allen, Greg Osby, Gary Thomas, Naná Vasconcelos) - 2:39
8. "At Risk" - 7:12
9. "Out of Harm's Way" - 6:12

== Personnel ==
- Gary Thomas - tenor saxophone, flute synthesizer
- Greg Osby - alto saxophone, synthesizer (tracks 7 & 9)
- Mick Goodrick (tracks 6 & 8), John Scofield (tracks 1, 3 & 8) - guitar
- Geri Allen, (tracks 4, 5 & 7), Tim Murphy (tracks 1–6, 8 & 9) - piano, synthesizer
- Anthony Cox - bass (tracks 1–6, 8 & 9)
- Dennis Chambers - drums (tracks 1–6, 8 & 9)
- Naná Vasconcelos - percussion (tracks 1, 2, 4-6 & 8)
