= Gary Thomas (musician) =

American jazz saxophonist and flautist (born 1961)

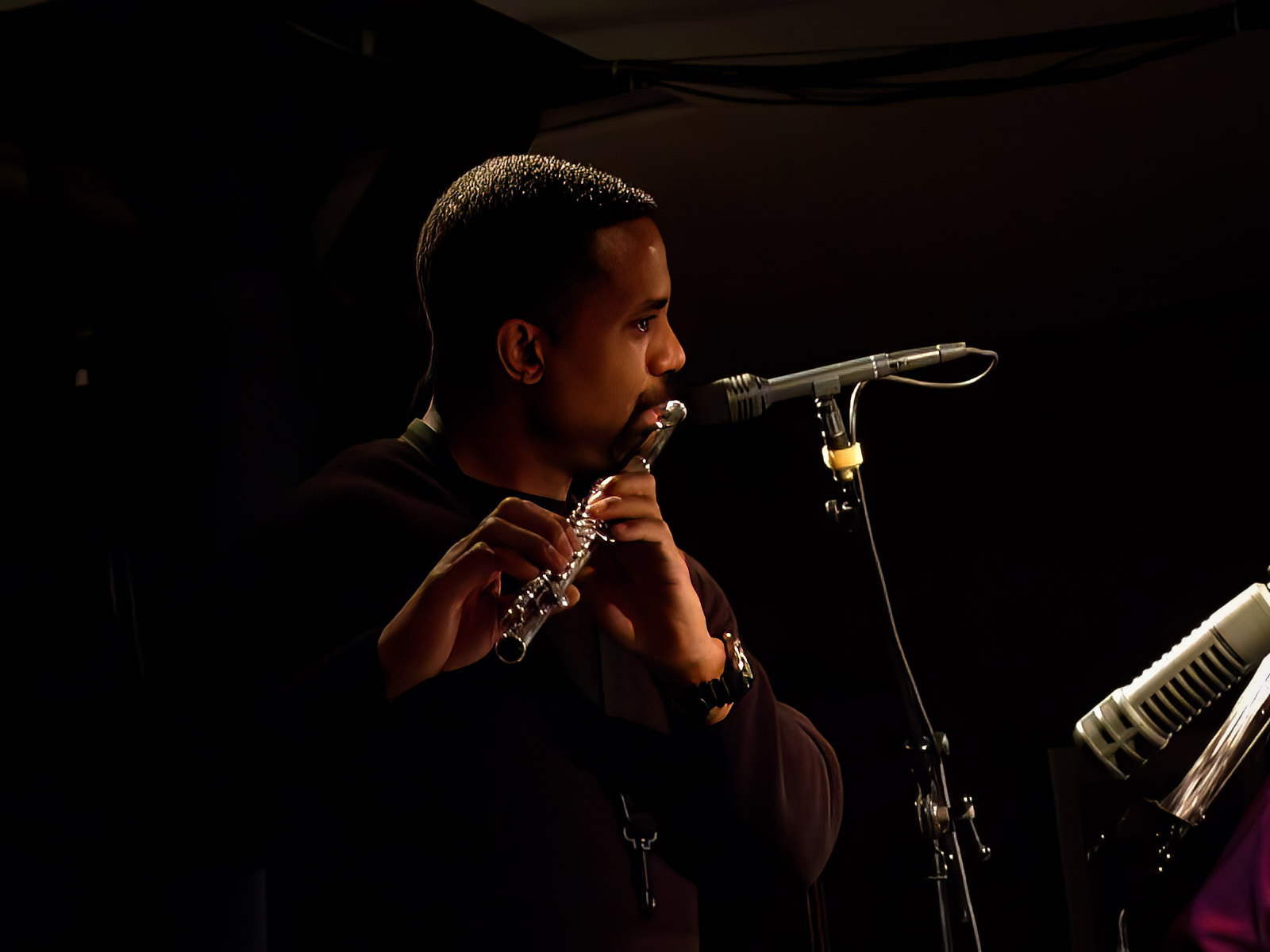
- Gary Thomas in Munich (2002)

Background information
- Born: June 10, 1961 (age 65); Baltimore, Maryland, U.S.
- Genres: Jazz, avant-garde
- Occupation: Musician
- Instruments: Saxophone, flute
- Labels: Enja, JMT, Winter & Winter

Gary Thomas (born June 10, 1961) is an American jazz saxophonist and flautist, born in Baltimore, Maryland. He was a member of Jack DeJohnette's Special Edition band and has worked with John McLaughlin, Herbie Hancock, Pat Metheny, John Scofield, Jim Hall, Dave Holland, Greg Osby, Wayne Shorter, Ravi Coltrane, Cassandra Wilson, Wallace Roney, Steve Coleman, and Miles Davis.

Thomas was the Director and Chair of Jazz Studies at Johns Hopkins University in Baltimore.

== Discography ==
=== As leader ===
- The Seventh Quadrant (Enja,1987)
- Code Violations (Enja, 1988)
- By Any Means Necessary (JMT, 1989)
- While the Gate Is Open (JMT, 1990)
- The Kold Kage (JMT, 1991)
- Corporate Art (JMT, 1991)
- Till We Have Faces (JMT, 1992)
- Exile's Gate (JMT, 1993)
- Overkill (JMT, 1995)
- Found on Sordid Streets (Winter & Winter, 1997)
- Pariah's Pariah (Winter & Winter, 1998)

=== As sideman ===
With Uri Caine

- Sphere Music (JMT, 1993)
- Toys (JMT, 1996)

With George Colligan

- Ultimatum (Criss Cross, 2002)
- Mad Science (Sunny Sky, 2003)

With Jack DeJohnette

- Irresistible Forces (Impulse!/MCA, 1987)
- Audio-Visualscapes (Impulse!/MCA, 1988)
- Earthwalk (Blue Note, 1991)
- Extra Special Edition (Blue Note, 1994)

With Wallace Roney

- Verses (Muse, 1987)
- Intuition (Muse, 1988)
- The Standard Bearer (Muse, 1990) – rec. 1989
- Obsession (Muse, 1991) – rec. 1990
- No Job Too Big or Small (Savoy Jazz, 1999) – compilation

With Peter Herborn

- Traces of Trane (JMT, 1992)
- Large One (Jazzline, 1998) – rec. 1997
- Large Two (Jazzline, 2002) – rec. 2000

With Gabrielle Goodman

- Travelin' Light (JMT, 1993)
- Until We Love (JMT, 1994)

With Sam Rivers' Rivbea All-star Orchestra

- Inspiration (BMG France, 1999) – rec. 1998
- Culmination (BMG France, 1999) – rec. 1998

With Lonnie Plaxico

- So Alive (Eighty-Eight's, 2004)
- West Side Stories (Plaxmusic, 2006)

With John McLaughlin

- The Heart of Things (Verve, 1997)
- The Heart of Things: Live in Paris (Verve, 2000) – live rec. 1998

With others

- John B. Arnold, Logorhythms (La Frontiera, 2004)
- Paul Bollenback, Brightness of Being (Elefant Dreams, 2006)
- Cecil Brooks III, The Collective (Muse, 1989)
- Terri Lyne Carrington, Jazz Is a Spirit (ACT, 2002)
- Steve Coleman, Sine Die (Pangaea, 1988)
- Corpulent (Joel Grip & Devin Gray), Wolfwalk (Umlaut, 2005)
- Andrzej Cudzich, Able To Listen (Polonia, 1996)
- Christy Doran, Mark Helias and Bobby Previte, Corporate Art (JMT, 1991)
- Herbie Hancock and John McLaughlin, Carnegie Hall Salutes The Jazz Masters compilation (Verve, 1994) – one track, It's About That Time
- Stefon Harris, Black Action Figure (Blue Note, 1999)
- Peter Herborn, Large 2 (Jazzline, 2002)
- Ingrid Jensen, Higher Grounds (Enja, 1999)
- Jacek Kochan, Man of No Words (Gowi, 2008)
- Greg Osby, The Invisible Hand (Blue Note, 1999)
- Adam Pierończyk, Digivooco (PAO, 2001)
- Tony Reedus, Incognito (Enja, 1989)
- Tom Williams, Straight Street (Criss Cross, 1993)
- Cassandra Wilson, Jumpworld (JMT, 1990)
