= Thomas G. Carpenter Library =

Library at the University of North Florida

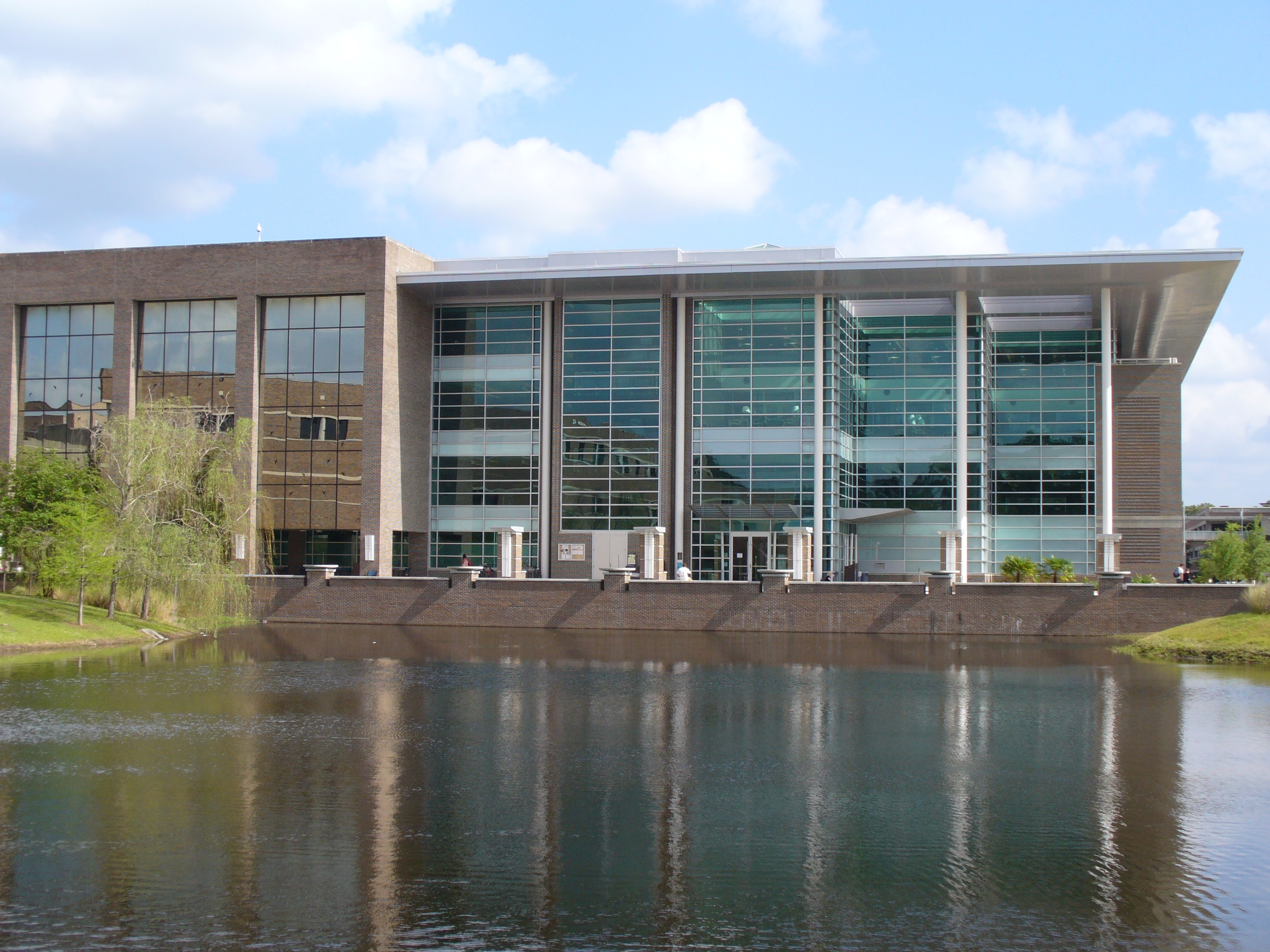
- Type: Public
- Established: 1980
- Location: Jacksonville, Florida, USA; 30.26927°N 81.50847°W
- Website: www.unf.edu/library

The Thomas G. Carpenter Library is the library at the University of North Florida. It is named after the university's founding president, Thomas G. Carpenter.

== History ==
Construction first began on the library in 1978, and the building was opened October 1, 1980. A dedication ceremony took place a year later, on August 15, 1981. The architects for the original building were Helman, Hurley, Charvat, and Peacock. In 2004, a $22.5 million, four-story addition and renovation project began, intended to handle the university's growing student population. The architects for the addition were Rink Design Partnerships, Inc, and the contractor was Turner Construction. The project expanded the building's size from 120,000 square feet (11,000 m^{2}) to 199,000 sq. feet. The addition opened December 2005 and was celebrated October 5th, 2006.

== Services ==
Currently the Library has 300 public workstations, 17 group study rooms, 37 carrels, 21 faculty, 24 support staff, over 1.4 million microform units, over 800 videos, 13,000 electronic journals, over 52,000 electronic books, and over 800,000 volumes. Electronic resources are available to community users off campus. Free wireless Internet is provided throughout the entire building and laptops are available for checkout to currently enrolled students. Special Borrower ID's are also available for purchase by non-UNF students, which allow for a rental of up to 10 items. Special borrower ID's are free per-semester for students enrolled in Florida State College of Jacksonville. The building can seat 2,000 patrons. The library also holds the university's archives and special collections.

== Allen Lastinger Center for Florida History ==
The Allen Lastinger Center for Florida History opened in 2025. It is a collection of resources devoted to Florida's economic and transportation history.
