= Thomas G. Carpenter =

American academic administrator (1926–2021)

11th President of Memphis State University
- In office 1980–1991
- Preceded by: Billy Mac Jones
- Succeeded by: V. Lane Rawlins

1st President of the University of North Florida
- In office 1969–1980
- Succeeded by: Curtis L. McCray

Personal details
- Born: February 27, 1926
- Died: January 6, 2021 (aged 94) Winston-Salem, North Carolina, U.S.
- Known for: Being the President of Memphis State and the founder of University of North Florida

Academic background
- Education: University of Florida, Baylor University, Memphis State College
- Thesis: A preventive approach to the migrant labor problem in Florida agriculture (1963)

Academic work
- Discipline: Education
- Institutions: University of Florida; Florida Atlantic University; University of West Florida; University of North Florida; Memphis State University

Thomas Glenn Carpenter (February 27, 1926 – January 6, 2021) was an American educator and university administrator. He was the founding President of the University of North Florida (UNF), serving from 1969 to 1980, and was President of Memphis State University (now the University of Memphis) from 1980 to 1991. The University of North Florida's Thomas G. Carpenter Library is named for him.

== Early life ==
Carpenter was born on February 27, 1926, a son of Walker Carpenter. He attended Georgia Tech for two years, during which time he enlisted in the U.S. Navy and played for the Yellow Jackets college football team. He also joined the Phi Delta Theta fraternity. Before completing his degree he was called to active duty, and was stationed in the Pacific Theatre at the end of World War II. He was discharged in 1946 and enrolled at several colleges, and attended a Baltimore Colts football training camp, before relocating to Memphis, Tennessee with his wife, Oneida. There he enrolled at Memphis State College (now the University of Memphis), earning a bachelor's degree in Business in 1949. He received his master's degree in Economics from Baylor University in 1950, and in 1954 he relocated to Florida to pursue further studies at the University of Florida.

== Academic career ==
Carpenter began his career in education while at the University of Florida, serving as an economics instructor as well as Assistant Director of Housing. He earned his Ph.D. in economics in 1963.

He subsequently took positions at Florida Atlantic University and the University of West Florida, where he was the second person hired. In 1969 he was appointed by the Florida Board of Regents as the first president of a planned new state university at Jacksonville, to be named the University of North Florida. He assumed the office on August 1, 1969. As president Carpenter oversaw the development of the school's 1,000-acre woodland tract on Jacksonville's Southside and the construction of the first buildings. Under Carpenter's leadership, the university celebrated its groundbreaking ceremony on September 18, 1971, and its official opening on October 2, 1972. He was responsible for declaring the campus a nature preserve. "Lake Oneida", a man-made lake in the preserve, is named for his wife, Oneida. Carpenter also took special interest in the library, and oversaw the construction of the current facility, completed in 1980. On August 15, 1981, following Carpenter's departure from the university, the library was rededicated and renamed the Thomas G. Carpenter Library.

In 1980 Carpenter stepped down as President of the University of North Florida, and was succeeded by interim President Andrew A. Robinson. The same year he accepted the presidency of his alma mater Memphis State, serving until 1991.

== Later life ==
After retiring from Memphis State, Carpenter retired to Blowing Rock, North Carolina, with his wife, Oneida. He remarried after her death, and he and his second wife continued visiting the University of North Florida for major events. He died on January 6, 2021, in Winston-Salem, North Carolina, at the age of 94.

== Bibliography ==
- Schafer, Daniel L. (1982). From Scratch Pads and Dreams: A Ten Year History of the University of North Florida. University of North Florida.
- UNF Thomas G. Carpenter Library Factsheet.

Academic offices
New office	President of the University of North Florida; 1969–1980	Succeeded by Andrew A. Robinson
Preceded by Billy Mac Jones	President of Memphis State University (now University of Memphis); 1980–1991	Succeeded by V. Lane Rawlins
