= Billy Mac Jones =

American historian and university president (1925–2007)

8th President of Memphis State University
- In office 1973–1980
- Preceded by: Cecil C. Humphreys
- Succeeded by: Thomas G. Carpenter

5th President of Southwest Texas State University
- In office 1969–1973

Personal details
- Born: April 5, 1925 Abilene, Texas, U.S.
- Died: October 27, 2007 (aged 82) San Angelo, Texas, U.S.
- Known for: Being the President of Memphis State University and Southwest Texas State University

Academic background
- Education: Vanderbilt University, George Peabody College, Texas Tech University

Academic work
- Discipline: History
- Sub-discipline: History of the American Southwest
- Institutions: Texas Tech University; Angelo State University; Southwest Texas State University; Memphis State University; Wichita State University

Billy Mac Jones (April 5, 1925 – October 27, 2007) was an American historian, coach, and academic administrator. He served as the eighth president of Memphis State University (now the University of Memphis) from 1973 to 1980, and previously as the fifth president of Southwest Texas State University in San Marcos, Texas, from 1969 to 1973. In 1998, the University of Memphis named the Billy Mac Jones Advancement Building on its campus in his honor.

== Early life and education ==
Jones was born in Abilene, Texas, on April 5, 1925, the younger of two sons of Andy and Faye Barton Jones. He moved to San Angelo, Texas, as a teenager and attended San Angelo College, where he earned junior college All-American honors as a football player. His studies were interrupted by service in the United States Navy during World War II, from 1943 to 1946. After the war, he returned to San Angelo College and was recruited to play football at Vanderbilt University on a scholarship.

Jones earned a bachelor's degree from Vanderbilt in 1950, a Master of Arts from George Peabody College in 1952, and a Doctor of Philosophy from Texas Tech University in 1963. During the 1967–68 academic year, he completed postdoctoral training at the University of Colorado through an academic internship designed to prepare candidates for college presidencies.

== Coaching career ==
Jones began his career as a teacher and coach at Hillsboro High School, from 1950 to 1954, where his basketball teams won three district championships, a Nashville Interscholastic League championship, and a regional championship, compiling a record of 93–23. He was then an assistant football coach at Middle Tennessee State University from 1954 to 1958, a tenure that included the program's undefeated 1957 season and NAIA national championship. He concluded his coaching career with two seasons as an assistant football coach at Texas A&M University. He was inducted into the Tennessee Sports Hall of Fame in 1979.

== Academic career ==
=== Early positions ===
Jones joined the faculty of San Angelo College in 1959 as chairman of social science, before pursuing doctoral studies at Texas Tech University, where he was also an instructor. In 1963, he returned to Angelo State University as chairman of the history department and dean of students.

In 1969, Jones became the fifth president of Southwest Texas State University (now Texas State University).

=== Memphis State University ===
Jones resigned from Southwest Texas State in 1973 to become the eighth president of Memphis State University, succeeding Cecil C. Humphreys. He was formally inaugurated in May 1974. As president, Jones created the university's first development office and worked to broaden the university's base of support and raise the quality of its academic programs. In 1979, the NCAA placed the university's athletic program on a two-year probation. He stepped down in 1980 and was succeeded by Thomas G. Carpenter.

=== Wichita State University ===
After leaving Memphis State, Jones joined Wichita State University as an endowed professor in the College of Business Administration, holding the Chair of Entrepreneurship and Small Business Management from 1980 to 1992. He also served as dean of the Barton School of Business in 1990–91 and was named distinguished professor emeritus in 1993.

== Writing ==
Jones wrote 22 books over his career, including histories of the American Southwest, academic textbooks, and biographies of entrepreneurs published in the Wichita State University business heritage series.

== Personal life and death ==
Jones was married to Doris Jane Hudson Jones, who predeceased him, and later to Dorothy Robinson Gaye Jones. He and his first wife endowed a University of Memphis scholarship in memory of their son, Russell A. Jones, a university graduate who died in a 1994 car crash. Jones was a member of the Johnson Street Church of Christ in San Angelo. He died in San Angelo, Texas, on October 27, 2007, at the age of 82, survived by his wife, three sons, ten grandchildren, and three great-grandchildren.
