= The Spinnaker =

Student newspaper of the University of North Florida

The Spinnaker
- Type: Student newspaper
- Format: Tabloid
- Owner(s): University of North Florida
- Publisher: Dagher Printing
- Editor: Jeanne Gilbert
- Founded: 1977
- Headquarters: UNF Student Union Jacksonville, FL
- Website: The Spinnaker

The Spinnaker is the official student magazine, 24/7 website, radio station, and TV station of the University of North Florida (UNF). The first issue of the magazine/newspaper was published August 17, 1977. The newspaper is published on a weekly basis during the school year, with new issues roughly once a month in the summer. Issues are distributed free around campus and are available in full form on The Spinnaker's website. It is the third student newspaper in the university's history.

The first newspaper on campus for students began as The Halyard and ran from 1974-1976. It was followed by The Phoenix (1976–1977) and The Spinnaker (1977–present). The Spinnaker office is located in UNF's Student Union.

== Awards ==
In 2005, The Spinnaker won a "Best of Show" award at the Associated Collegiate Press's National College Media Convention in Kansas City, Missouri, for the Number 1 paper among four-year weekly tabloid-size student newspapers in the country. In 2009, the paper was named the 2nd best Florida college newspaper, and won Best Front Page Design and Best General News Writing award from the Florida College Press Association. In 2010 it received a Pacemaker Award.
