= Rink Design Partnership =

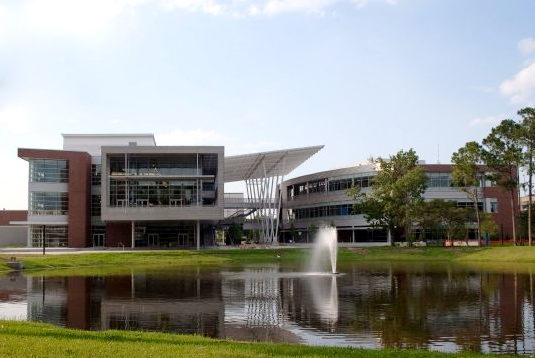
Student Union (University of North Florida)

Rink Design Partnership was an architectural firm in Jacksonville, Florida. The firm's best known work may be the University of North Florida Student Union building. It was listed as one of Florida's top 100 buildings by the American Institute of Architects. The firm was in business for about 25 years and closed in 2010 over financial issues. Jack Diamond, known as "Mr. Downtown", was the firm's senior principal. Other principals were Glenn Dasher, Craig Davisson and Tom Hurst In 2010, Diamond opened a new firm called Diamond Architectural Group.

== Works ==
- Student Union (University of North Florida) (2009) at the University of North Florida
- Marina San Pablo Condominium and Yacht Club, upscale 56-unit condominium building and marina along the Intracoastal Waterway off J. Turner Butler Boulevard
- Pier Point mixed-use development in Jacksonville Beach
- Cummer Museum of Art & Gardens' Jacobsen Gallery and central building
- Ortega Landing condominiums and clubhouse
