= University of North Florida =

Public university in Jacksonville, Florida, US

Coordinates: 30°16′6″N 81°30′30″W

- Motto: "No one like you. No place like this."
- Type: Public research university
- Established: 1965; 61 years ago
- Parent institution: State University System of Florida
- Accreditation: SACS
- Academic affiliations: CUMU; Space-grant
- Endowment: $164.5 million (2025)
- President: Angela Garcia Falconetti (interim)
- Faculty: 679
- Students: 16,406 (fall 2022)
- Undergraduates: 14,662
- Postgraduates: 2,381
- Location: Jacksonville, Florida, United States
- Campus: 1,300 acres (5.3 km^{2})
- Other campuses: Palm Coast
- Newspaper: The Spinnaker
- Colors: Blue and gray
- Nickname: Ospreys
- Sporting affiliations: NCAA Division I – ASUN; CCSA
- Mascot: Ozzie Osprey
- Website: www.unf.edu

The University of North Florida (UNF) is a public research university in Jacksonville, Florida, United States. It is part of the State University System of Florida and is accredited by the Commission on Colleges of the Southern Association of Colleges and Schools to award baccalaureate, masters, and doctorate degrees. Its campus comprises 1,300 acres amid a natural preserve on Jacksonville's Southside. It is classified among "R2: Doctoral Universities – High research activity".

UNF was established in 1965 and began offering classes in 1972. UNF was initially designated an upper division college for juniors and seniors. It began admitting freshmen in 1984. UNF is organized into six colleges, five of which offer undergraduate and graduate degree programs, including doctoral degree programs, with noted business, coastal biology, nursing, nutrition, and music programs. Most students reside off campus, though there are six areas of on-campus housing. In 2006, the Social Sciences building became the first facility to be LEED-certified in northeast Florida, as well as the first "green" building on campus. As of 2010, five buildings on campus have been certified by the U.S. Green Building Council.

The university has over 200 clubs and organizations for students as well as an active student government and Greek life. The student-run newspaper The Spinnaker is published monthly. The university's intercollegiate athletics teams are known as the Ospreys, and are members of the ASUN Conference in NCAA Division I.

== History ==
UNF Presidents
Thomas G. Carpenter	1969–1980
Andrew Robinson (interim)	1980–1982
Curtis L. McCray	1982–1988
Roy E. McTarnaghan (interim)	1988–1989
Adam W. Herbert	1989–1998
E. K. Fretwell (interim)	1998–1999
Anne H. Hopkins	1999–2002
A. David Kline (interim)	2002–2003
John A. Delaney	2003–2018
David Szymanski	2018–2021
Pamela S. Chally (interim)	2021–2022
Moez Limayem	2022-2026
Angela Garcia Falconetti (interim)	2026-present

The university was founded in 1969 after 1,000 acres (4.0 km^{2}) midway between downtown Jacksonville and the Jacksonville Beaches were set aside for the campus, 500 acres (2.0 km^{2}) of which were donated by the Skinner family of Jacksonville. Until this time, the only publicly funded institution of higher learning in the city was Florida Junior College. Construction on classrooms and buildings began in 1971 and UNF opened in the fall of 1972 with an initial enrollment of 2,027 juniors, seniors and graduate students, supported by 117 faculty and more than 150 staff. Originally, like the other Florida state institutions opened around this time, UNF was designated as a "senior" college, meaning it would enroll only upperclassmen and graduate students.

UNF graduated 35 students in 1973. The school was quick to expand and it was accredited by the Southern Association of Colleges and Schools in 1974. The school's mascot, the osprey, was adopted in November 1979 over other choices such as the armadillo, the manatee and the seagull. The male and female versions of the mascot are known as Ozzie and Harriet.

In 1980, there was a legislative effort to merge UNF with the University of Florida but a bill proposing this was vetoed by Governor Bob Graham. Freshmen and sophomores were admitted for the first time in 1984. Enrollment at UNF exceeded 10,000 in 1995, and in the spring of 2000 it broke its commencement record, graduating over 1,000 students.

The 2000s saw significant development on campus as many new buildings including the Social Science building, Science and Engineering building, College of Education and Human Services building, Fine Arts Center, the John A. Delaney Student Union, and Osprey Fountains residence hall were built. In 2002, a 13-member Board of Trustees began work to oversee UNF. Former mayor of Jacksonville John Delaney was appointed President of the university in 2003.

UNF was officially reclassified as an NCAA Division I school for its athletics programs in 2009.

== Campus ==
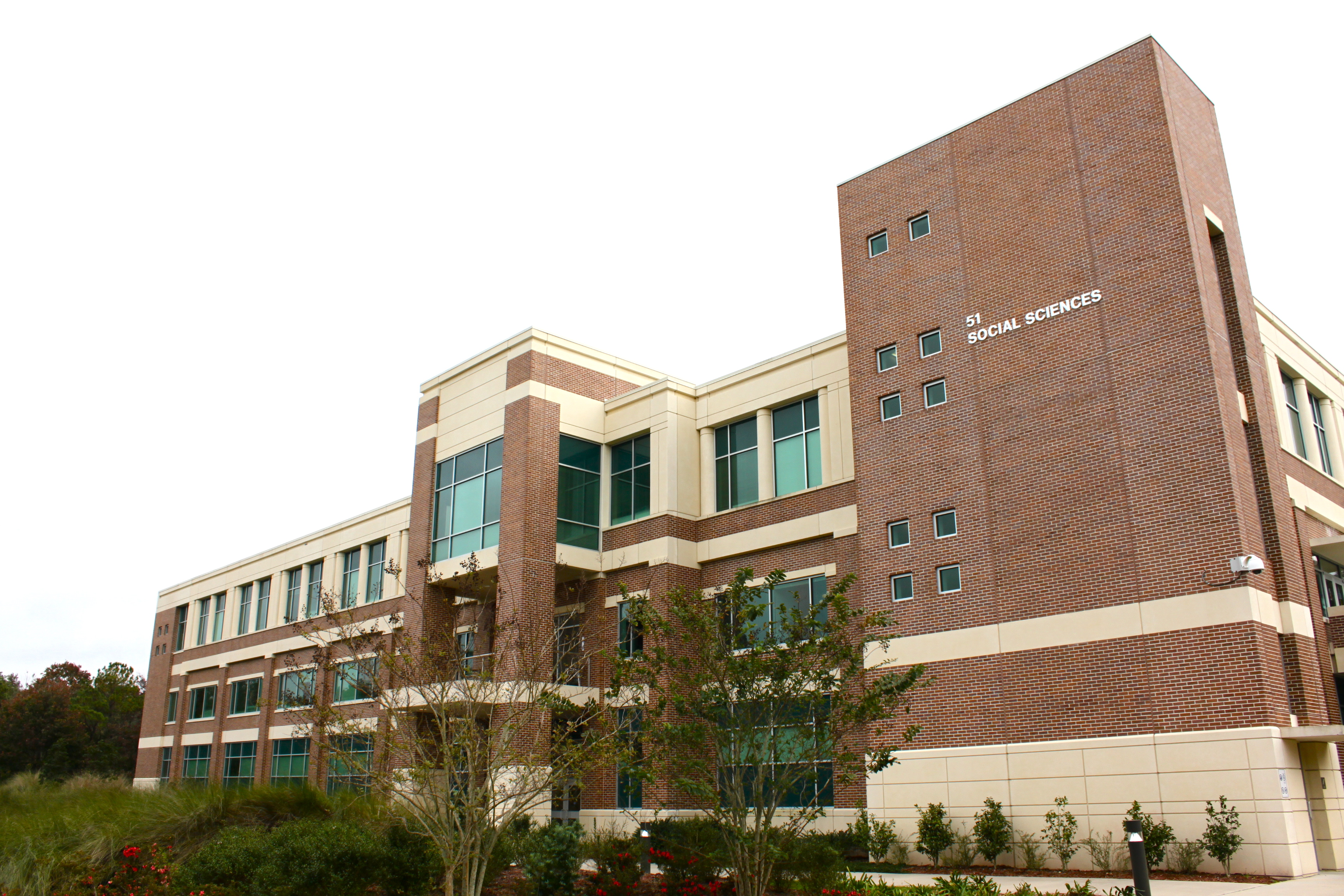
Social Sciences Building

UNF's campus is near the intersection of I-295 (East Beltway) and SR-202 (J. Turner Butler Boulevard), two major expressways in the Jacksonville area. UNF has 28 major buildings and six housing facilities on campus. Many of the buildings bear the names of individuals who have made significant contributions to the university. These buildings include the Coggin College of Business, the John E. Mathews, Jr. Computer and Information Sciences Building, and J. J. Daniel Hall. In addition, the library bears the name of the university's first president, Thomas G. Carpenter. The Green is a central open grassy area on the campus popular with students.

The Social Sciences building, which opened in the fall of 2006, became the first Northeast Florida facility to be certified by the Leadership in Energy and Environmental Design (LEED). Also the first "green" building on campus, it received the 2007 Award of Excellence for University Building by the Southeast Construction Company for Energy and Environmental Design. There is also a state-protected wildlife and bird sanctuary featuring miles of nature trails and numerous lakes and ponds on and around campus.

The size of the campus has grown to 1,300 acres (5.3 km^{2}). In the fall of 2007, the university began offering a shuttle service between campus locations including the dorms, UNF Hall, the parking lots, Carpenter Library, and the UNF Arena.

A new Biological Sciences building opened in the spring of 2012. A new Student Wellness Center opened in the fall of 2012, replacing the Dottie Dorion Fitness Center. An addition to the College of Education and Human Services was completed in December 2011. A new multi-story dining hall has been completed in the fall of 2012. All four buildings are expected to be LEED-certified.

=== Thomas G. Carpenter Library ===
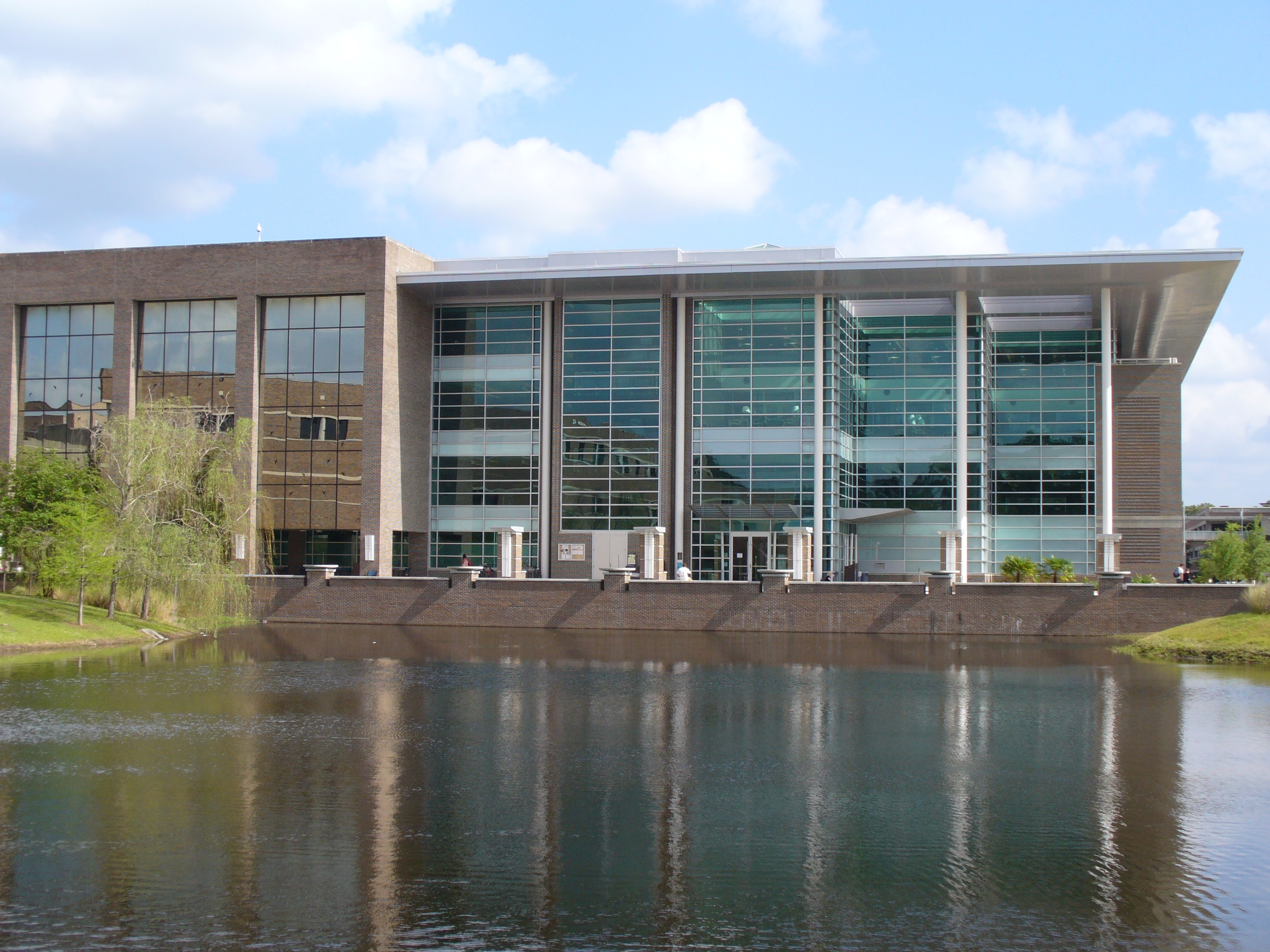
Thomas G. Carpenter Library

The Thomas G. Carpenter Library, or building 12, is named after the university's first president, Thomas G. Carpenter. Groundbreaking began on August 8, 1978, and was completed on October 1, 1980.

Construction to expand the library by adding a four-story addition began in May 2004. This addition added 79,000 square feet (7,300 m^{2}) and increased the capacity of the library from 800 to 2,000, bringing the size of the library to 199,000 square feet (18,500 m^{2}). Costing $22.5 million, the new addition was opened in December 2005.

The library has 328 public workstations, 18 group study rooms, 37 carrels, 19 faculty, 25 support staff, over 1.4 million microform units, over 800 videos, 13,000 electronic journals, over 52,000 electronic books, and over 840,000 volumes. Electronic resources are available off campus for students, faculty and staff. Free wireless Internet is available throughout the building and enrolled students can check out laptops.

=== John A. Delaney Student Union ===
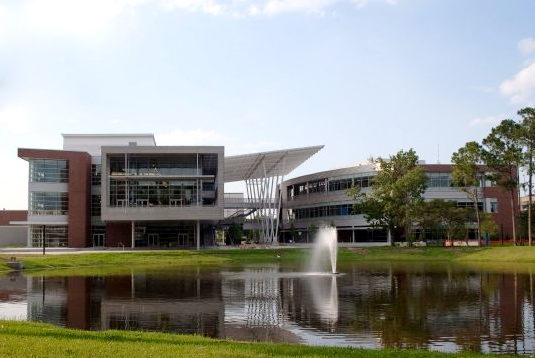
John A. Delaney Student Union

The John A. Delaney Student Union, which opened in 2009, contains a two-story bookstore, restaurants, game-room, auditorium, art gallery, ballroom, bank, and amphitheater. It is the home of UNF Student Government, The Spinnaker, Spinnaker Television, Spinnaker Radio, the Office of Fraternity & Sorority Life, the LGBT Resource Center, and other student organizations. The Student Union comprises two buildings, with a covered walkway in between known as "Osprey Plaza". The structure cost $50 million to construct and is a LEED-certified building. It is also one of the first Gold LEED-certified buildings in Jacksonville.

=== Museum of Contemporary Art Jacksonville ===
UNF acquired the Museum of Contemporary Art Jacksonville in 2009 as a cultural resource. The affiliation with the museum allows UNF to improve the facility's operations and marketing. Credit-bearing art classes and student art shows are planned. The acquisition is expected to improve the museum and UNF's art and design programs, increase UNF's downtown presence, and strengthen ties with the city. Coincidentally, UNF's Downtown Center which operated from 1978 to 1987 was in the building before it became the art museum.

=== UNF Arena ===
UNF Arena is a multi-purpose arena on the campus of the University of North Florida in Jacksonville, Florida. It is home to the North Florida Ospreys men's and women's basketball and women's volleyball teams. It is also used for other events, such as concerts and graduation ceremonies, and has served as the site of the Orlando Magic franchise's training camp. It opened in 1993 and has a capacity of up to 6,300. On March 8, 2015, the UNF Arena attendance record was set as 6,155 fans watched North Florida defeat USC Upstate in the 2015 Atlantic Sun Men's Basketball Tournament championship game. The previous record was set earlier that year as 5,102 fans watched the Ospreys defeat crosstown rival Jacksonville, 77–50 on February 6, 2015.

== Academics ==
=== Admissions and tuition ===
According to the Princeton Review, UNF has an acceptance rate of 72%. Enrolled students scoring between the 25th and 75th percentile on the SAT score 530–640 on Reading and 530–620 on Math. Enrolled students who took the ACT score 20–25. The average high school grade point average is 3.91.

For the 2021–2022 academic school year, in-state tuition and fees is $212.98 per credit hour and out-of-state tuition and fees is $693.11 per credit hour. For the 2020–2021 academic year, UNF provided over $60 million in scholarships and grants to students. On average, for students who were awarded need-based aid, 90% of need was met.

=== Faculty ===
As of fall 2020, UNF has 679 faculty members, 75 of which are visiting faculty. The faculty-to-student ratio is 1:19. Among all faculty, 656 (97%) are full-time; 334 (49%) are tenured and 113 (17%) are tenure-earning. About half (49.8%) of faculty are women, and 27% are non-white.

=== Rankings ===
Academic rankings

National
- Forbes: 358
- U.S. News & World Report: 263
- Washington Monthly: 104

UNF was ranked #263 (tie) among National Universities in the 2022-23 U.S. News & World Report Best Colleges ranking.

In 2021, U.S. News & World Report ranked UNF 272nd in national universities and 136th in public universities. UNF was also ranked 39th for best online bachelor's programs. Military Friendly's 2021 designation of UNF a military-friendly school was its 12th consecutive designation; nearly 1,400 veterans and military-affiliated students attend UNF, or roughly 8% of all students. In 2020, INSIGHT Into Diversity magazine awarded UNF the Higher Education Excellence in Diversity Award for the sixth time.

In 2024, Washington Monthly ranked UNF 104th among 438 national universities in the U.S. based on UNF's contribution to the public good, as measured by social mobility, research, and promoting public service.

=== Colleges ===
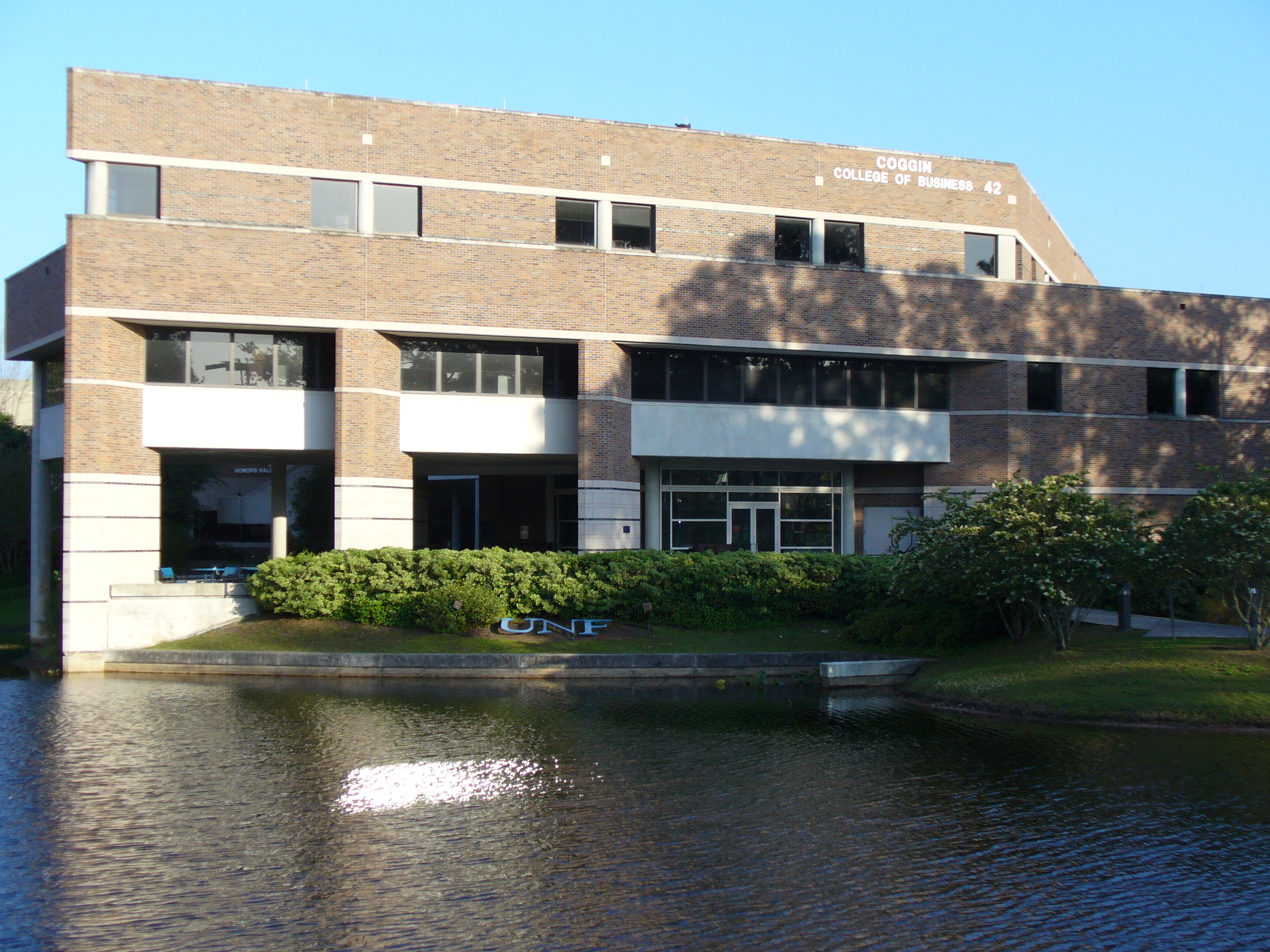
Coggin College of Business

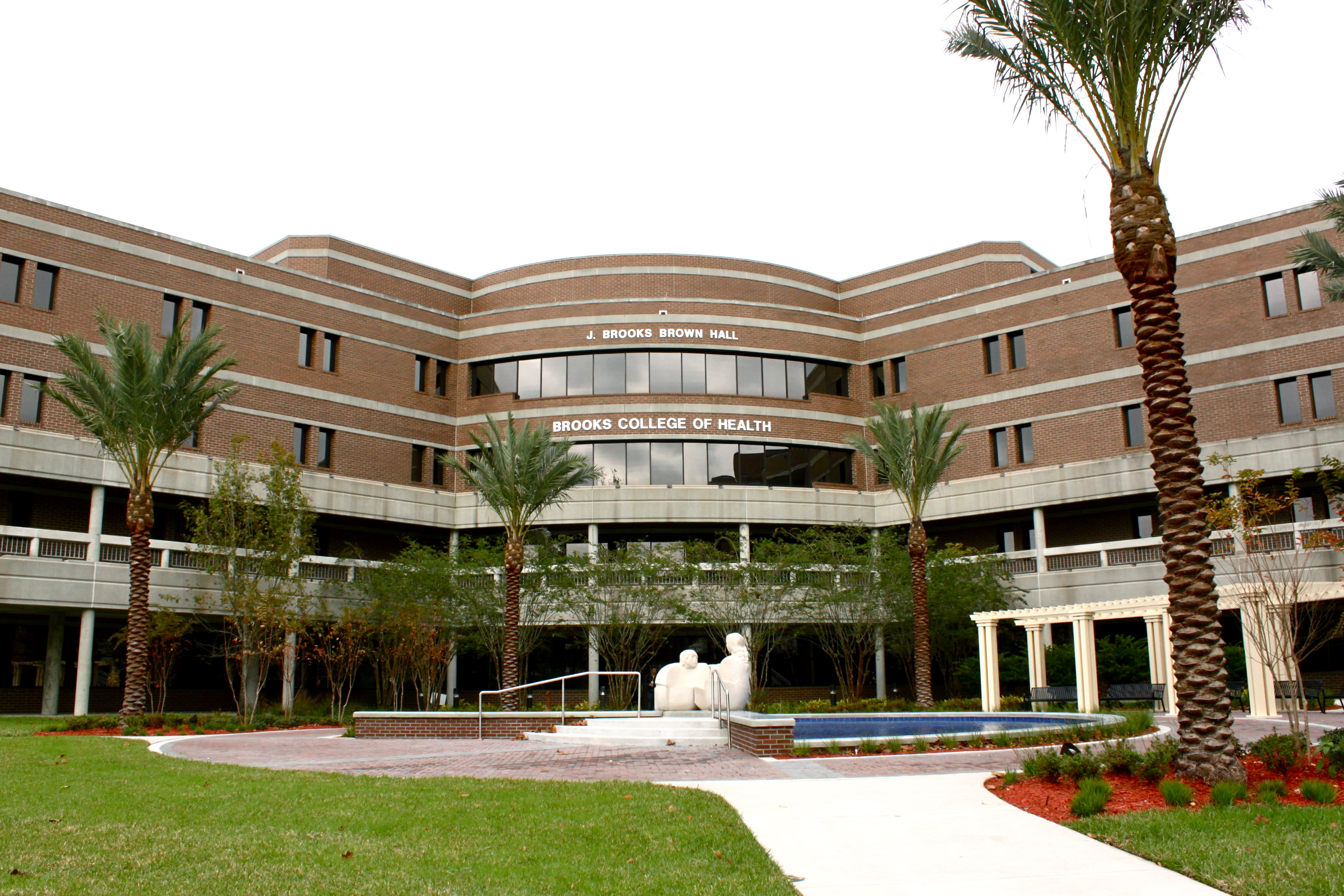
Brooks College of Health

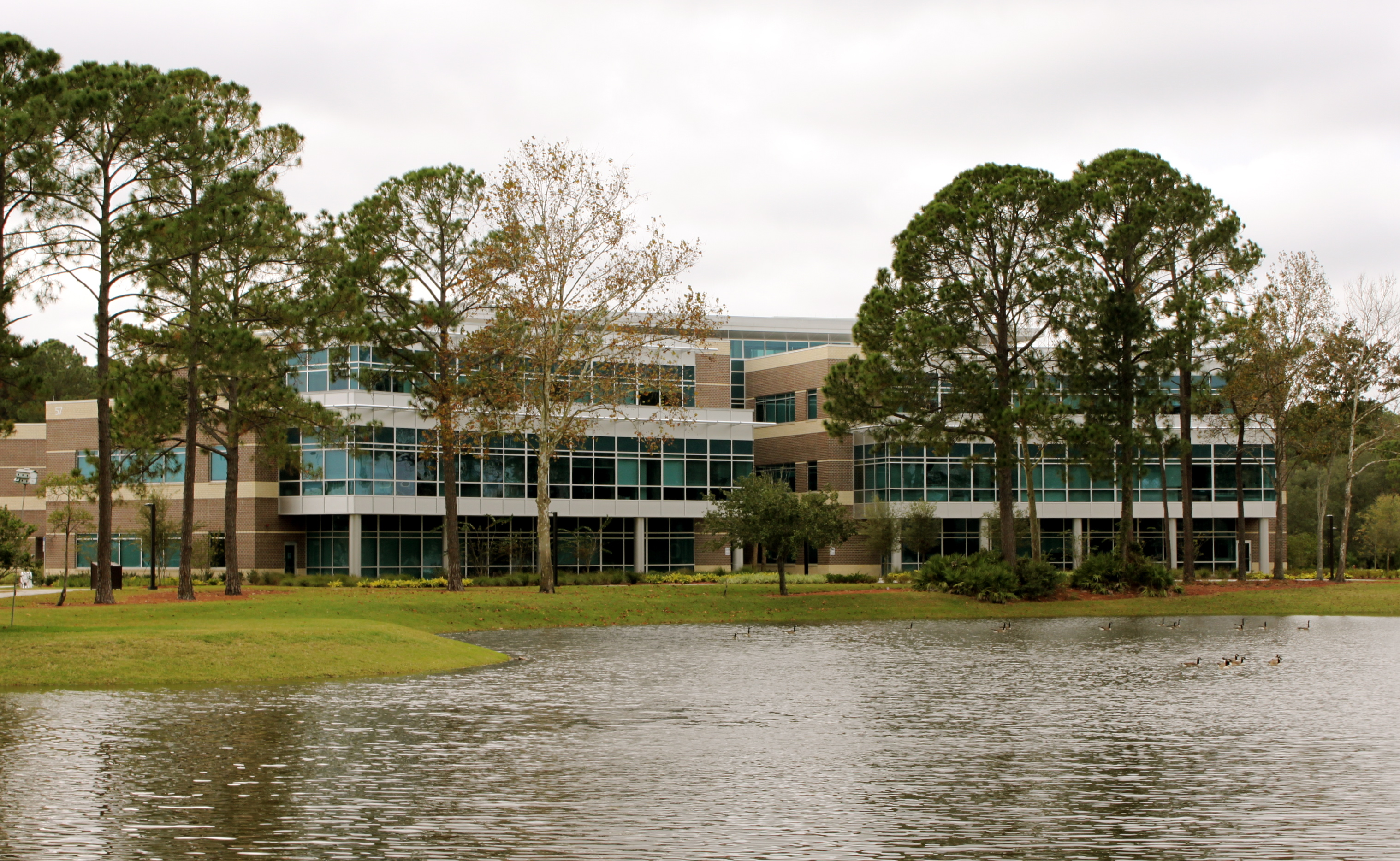
College of Education

UNF is organized into six colleges, five of which offer various undergraduate degree and graduate-degree programs (the sixth is a honors college). In the 2019–2020 school year, UNF awarded 3,419 Bachelor's degrees, 670 Master's degrees, and 165 doctoral degrees. Doctoral programs offered through the Brooks College of Health at UNF include Doctorate in Clinical Nutrition, BSN-DNP in Family Nurse Practitioner, BSN-DNP in Nurse Anesthetist, Post-MSN Doctor of Nursing Practice, Post-MSN Doctor of Nursing Practice in Psych-Mental Health and Doctor of Physical Therapy. The Silverfield College of Education and Human Services offers doctoral degrees in Specialist in Educational Leadership, Doctorate of Education in Educational Leadership, and Doctorate of Education in Curriculum and Instruction.

- College of Arts and Sciences. Student enrollment is 6,572, making it the largest college by enrollment at UNF. Academic Departments include art and design, biology, chemistry, physics, communications, criminology and criminal justice, English, history, mathematics and statistics, music, philosophy, political science and public administration, psychology, sociology, anthropology, religious studies, French, and Spanish.
- Coggin College of Business. One of UNF's three original colleges. Programs of the college are accredited by the Association to Advance Collegiate Schools of Business (AACSB). Student enrollment is 3,079 students.
- College of Computing, Engineering, and Construction. Comprising the School of Computing, School of Engineering, and Department of Construction Management. Enrollment is 2,033 students.
- Silverfield College of Education and Human Services. Also offers a Bachelor of Science in sport management. Accredited by the Commission on Colleges of the Southern Association of Colleges and Schools. Student enrollment is 1,559.
- Brooks College of Health. Enrollment is 3,130 students.
- Hicks Honors College is an interdisciplinary program created to provide opportunities for experiential and active learning in small class environments.

=== Notable and flagship programs ===
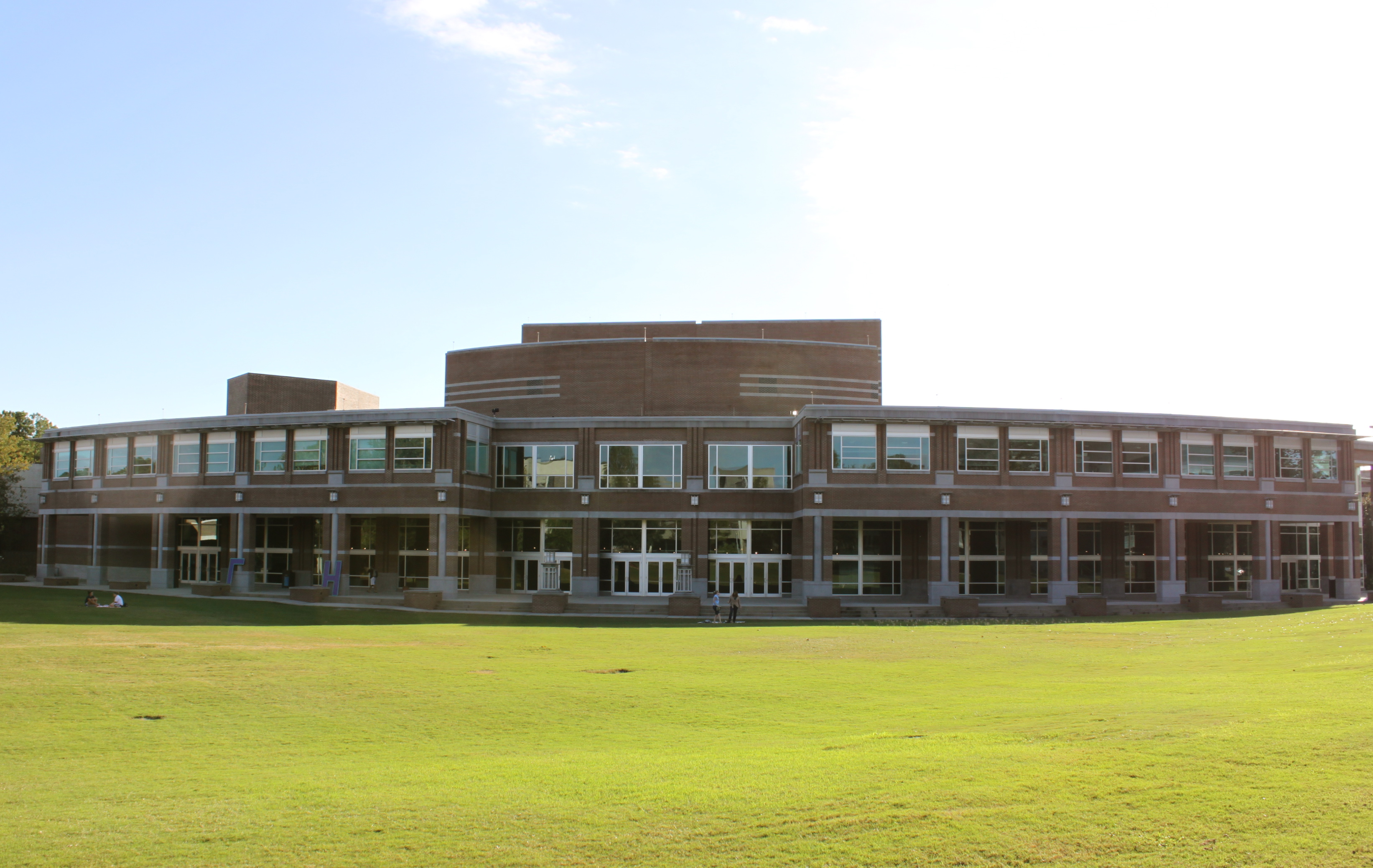
Fine Arts Center and the Green

The University of North Florida School of Music is well known for its jazz studies program, founded by jazz euphonium player Rich Matteson formally headed by saxophonist Bunky Green, with JB Scott now coordinator of jazz studies. The faculty of the Jazz Studies program includes other musicians such as Danny Gottlieb, Dennis Marks, Dave Steinmeyer, Todd DelGiudice, and Lynne Arriale. The UNF Jazz Ensemble 1 is internationally renowned, having performed at the North Sea Jazz Festival, the Montreux Jazz Festival, and a two-week tour of China. It was twice named the top collegiate jazz band in the nation by Down Beat magazine. A special component of the UNF jazz studies program is the Great American Jazz Series, which regularly brings in internationally known jazz artists as residents. This series, along with other opportunities, has enabled students to perform in concert with more than 100 esteemed artists, such as Herbie Hancock, the Count Basie Orchestra, Joe Henderson, Pat Metheny, Michael Brecker, Dave Brubeck, Joe Williams, Dianne Reeves, Mike Stern, Dave Weckl, Christian McBride, Louie Bellson, Billy Taylor, Arturo Sandoval, Jimmy Heath, Wynton Marsalis, Benny Green, Russell Malone, and Branford Marsalis.

In fall 2006, the Coggin College of Business was added to the Princeton Review's Best 282 Business Schools list. Two of the Coggin College of Business flagship programs are transportation and logistics and international business. The transportation and logistics program was ranked 13th in the nation by Supply Chain Management Review. The Princeton Review also recognized the college by naming it an "Outstanding Business School" in the 2009 and 2010 editions of the "Best 296 Business Schools". The College of Business is accredited by AACSB.

The coastal biology program is a flagship program from the College of Arts and Sciences and community nursing is a flagship program from the Brooks College of Health.

=== Academic centers and institutes ===
In addition to six colleges, UNF houses several academic units that provide additional services to UNF and the community.

- Center for Community Based Learning
- Center for Urban Education and Policy
- Continuing Education
- Environmental Center
- Florida Institute of Education
- The Graduate School
- Northeast Florida Center for Community Initiatives (CCI)
- Public Opinion Research Lab
- Small Business Development Center
- Office of Undergraduate Studies
- UNF Online

== Student life ==
=== Activities ===
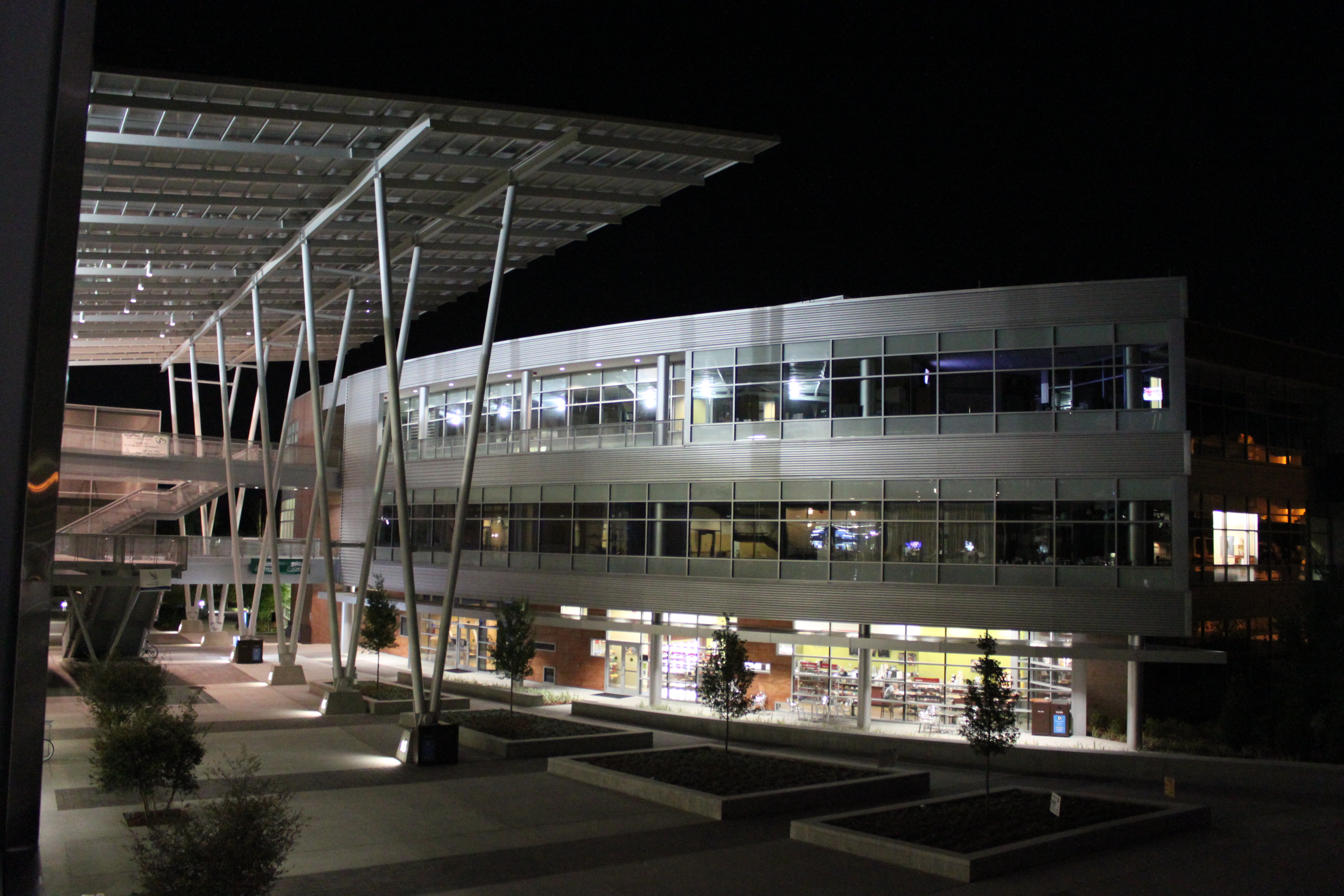
Osprey Plaza at the Student Union at night

UNF's Student Government is allocated $4.2 million in student fees annually to provide various services to students. The Student Government funds the Osprey Involvement Center (including over 200 clubs), the Lend-a-Wing Food Pantry, Osprey Life and Productions, the John A. Delaney Student Union, the Student Wellness Complex, and intramural sports. It is made up of three branches and an independent office: Legislative, Executive, Judicial, and the Office of Elections. The Executive Branch is managed by the Student Body President who also serves as the student representative on the UNF Board of Trustees. The Legislative Branch is composed of the Senate with 40 elected senators, led by an internally elected cabinet. The Judicial Branch is composed of nine justices, including a Chief Justice, appointed by the President and confirmed by the Senate. The Office of Elections is managed by a commissioner appointed by the President and approved by the Senate.

UNF has 32 Greek-lettered organizations. The chapters are advised by university staff. As of Fall 2021, chapters of Kappa Sigma, Lambda Chi Alpha, and Pi Kappa Phi are unrecognized by UNF for conduct issues. Kappa Sigma is ineligible to return, while Lambda Chi Alpha is. Pi Kappa Phi will be eligible to return in fall 2024.

UNF has over 200 clubs and organizations for students. Intercollegiate club sports such as rugby, lacrosse, and ice hockey are available. Students also participate in intramural sports on campus like soccer, ultimate frisbee, and sand volleyball on campus. The UNF Alumni Association organizes the UNF Presidential Envoys, a group of UNF students who serve as ambassadors for the President and the university on campus and in the community.

Osprey Life and Productions is UNF's entertainment agency. The free events they put on for students include concerts, comedy shows, movies, games, karaoke, and open mic nights.

The UNF Eco-Adventure Program allows students to use the miles of nature trails and multiple lakes on campus. The lakes are open to canoeing, kayaking, and catch-and-release, non-live-bait fishing. Students can also check out free outdoor equipment from the Eco-Adventure check out center.

Undergraduate demographics as of Fall 2023
Race and ethnicity	Total
White	50%
Hispanic	24%
Asian	12%
Black	5%
Two or more races	5%
International student	2%
Unknown	2%
Economic diversity
Low-income (Note: The percentage of students who received an income-based federal Pell grant intended for low-income students.)	23%
Affluent (Note: The percentage of students who are a part of the American middle class at the bare minimum.)	77%

=== Demographics ===
In fall 2020, the University of North Florida had 17,043 students, with 14,662 (86%) being undergraduate students and 2,381 (14%) being graduate students. Among graduate students, 1,841 (77%) are in Master's programs and 540 (23%) are in doctoral programs. Women make up 59% of all students. Full-time students make up 71% of the student body. The average student is 24 years old. Students from Florida make up 15,885 (93%) of all students, including 6,410 (38%) from Duval County alone.

=== Housing ===
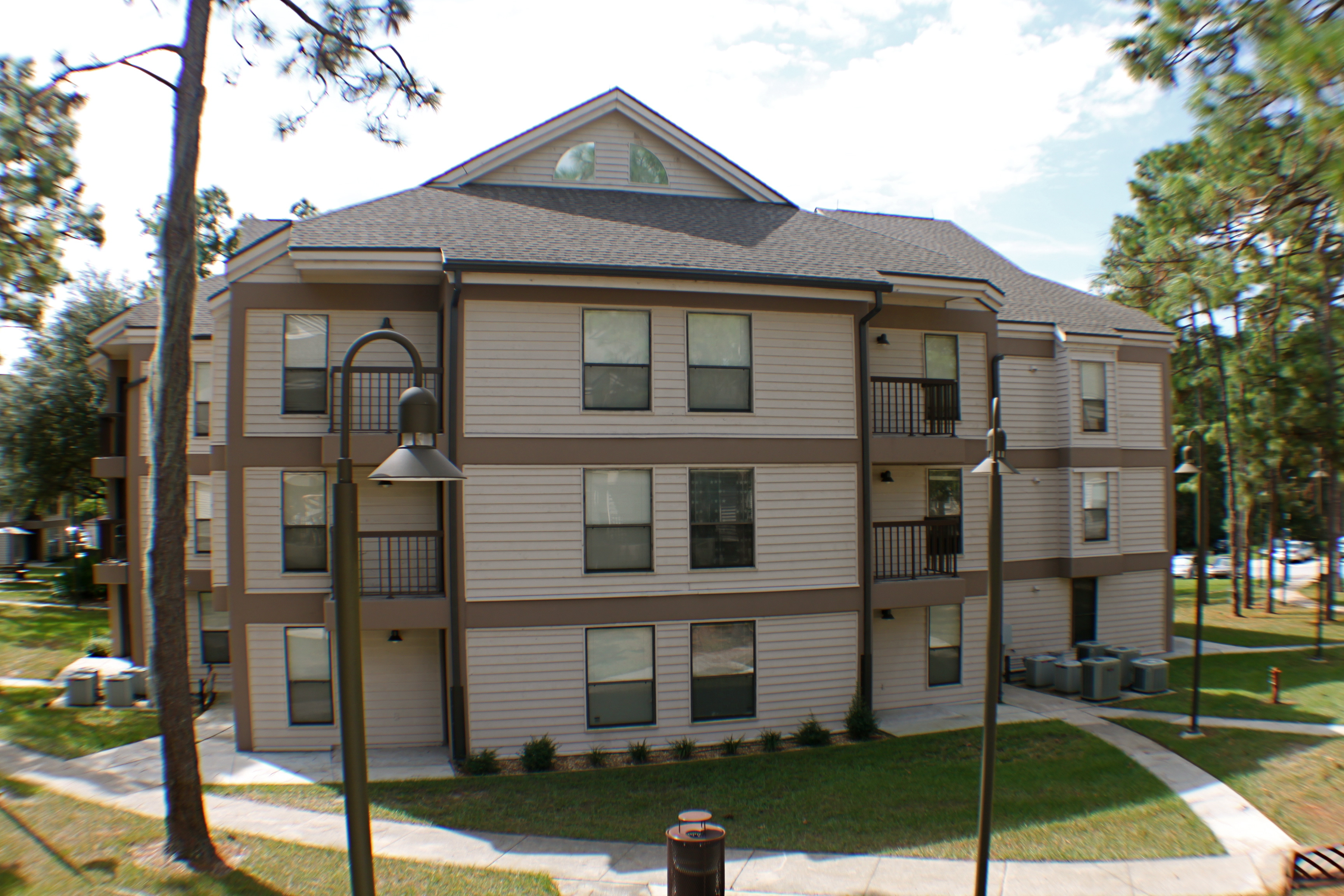
Osprey Village

The University of North Florida has eight areas of on-campus housing: Osprey Cove, Osprey Crossings, Osprey Hall, Osprey Landing, Osprey Ridge, Osprey Village, Osprey Fountains, and The Flats at UNF. Cove, Crossings, and Landing offer similar, suite/efficiency-like rooms; each of these are designed for triple-occupancy and house two to three residents, with some accommodating individual rooms for disabled students. Hall offers more of a traditional, dorm-like environment with double-occupancy rooms and communal bathrooms and showers. Village and The Flats offer an apartment-like feel with multiple-occupancy accommodations. Cove, Crossings, Hall, and Landing are designated for freshmen (although upperclassmen also live there), while Village, Fountains, and The Flats are upperclassmen residence halls.

Fountains was the first residence hall on campus to provides private individual rooms, joined by Osprey Ridge in Fall 2025. The five-story building houses 1,000 students and consists of 365,000 square feet (33,900 m^{2}). The building is divided into two towers, North and South, both of which has two "houses" per floor. It includes a convenience store, grill and common area, kitchens, a recreational facility, laundry rooms, a swimming pool, and a lazy river. Other amenities include The Morgue, a library-like study room; Joe's Diner, a 50s style study room with an iPod-compatible jukebox; and The Galaxy, a game room including Xbox 360s, PS3s, Nintendo Wiis, as well as some previous-generation consoles attached to wide-screen high-definition televisions.

In Fall 2025, Osprey Ridge opened to serve as the primary residence hall for the Hicks Honors College. The four-story building houses the Hicks Honors College living-learning community (LLC) that was previously in Osprey Crossings. The building spans more than 165,000 square feet and has room for 520 students. Both freshman and upperclassmen housing is offered.

Most UNF students reside off campus.

=== Media ===
The Spinnaker is the weekly student-run newspaper. UNF's student-run television channel is Spinnaker Television, which shows full-length movies, UNF athletics and events. It is channel 170 on the campus. Spinnaker Radio broadcasts music at WSKR-LP 95.5 FM (100-watt low power FM), online, and on channel 171 on campus. The UNF Journal is the official publication for university alumni, and Inside is an electronic newsletter published monthly for faculty and staff.

The university is the home of literary journal Fiction Fix, which has published nine issues since its inception in 2002. Issues have included works by authors from UNF, across the United States and around the world.

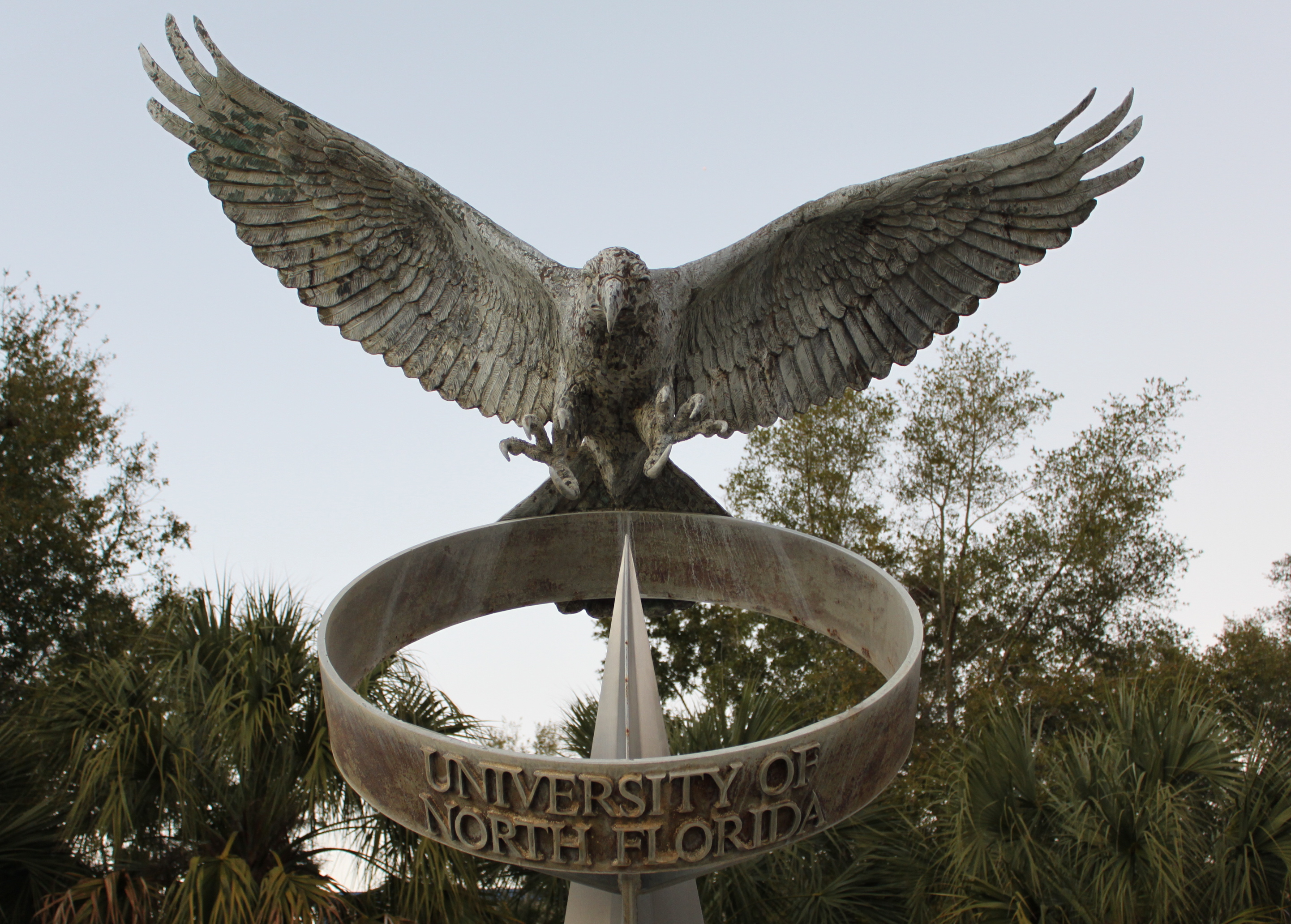
Iconic Osprey Statue outside of UNF Arena

== Athletics ==
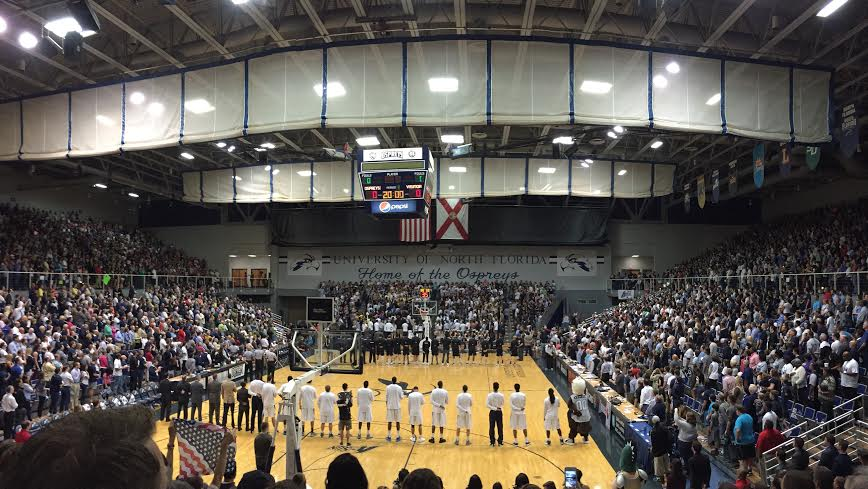
Men's basketball at UNF Arena

The University of North Florida's intercollegiate teams, known as the North Florida Ospreys, compete at the NCAA Division I level. UNF began intercollegiate sports in 1983 as a member of the NAIA, then later moved the NCAA Division II, and is a member of the ASUN Conference in NCAA Division I.

UNF competes in 17 sports and won the Sunshine State Conference's all-sports title four times. In 2005, the Men's baseball team competed for the Division II world series, capturing second place overall. In addition the men's tennis team also was national Division II runners-up. UNF has captured the Peach Belt Conference Commissioner's Cup five consecutive times. The Ospreys have brought home four national titles—men's golf in 1991 and 1993, and women's tennis in 1986 and 1994. UNF's first Division I conference title came in 2008 when the men's golf team captured the Atlantic Sun crown. The university added a women's golf program in 2012.

In 2015, for the first time in UNF history, the men's basketball team received a bid to the NCAA Division I men's basketball tournament by winning the Atlantic Sun tournament. The A-Sun championship game was played at UNF Arena in front of a record crowd of 6,155 who watched the Ospreys defeat USC Upstate 63–57. Following the win, the team and university drew unprecedented media attention both locally and nationally.

== Notable alumni ==
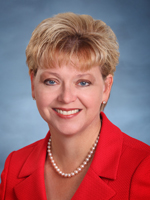
Janet Adkins

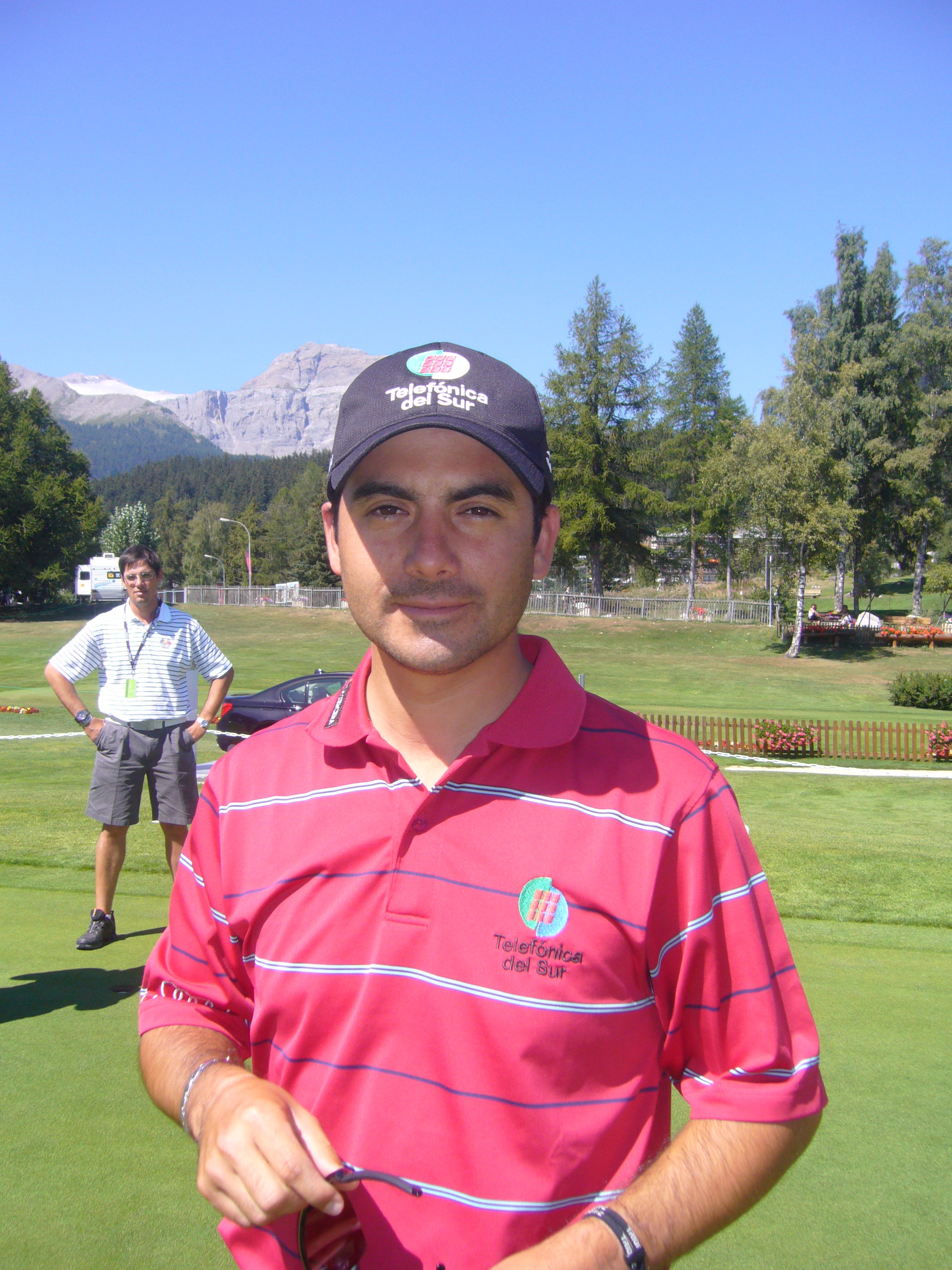
Felipe Aguilar

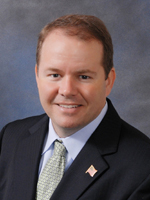
Travis Cummings

Drayton Florence

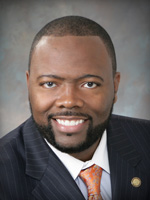
Reggie Fullwood

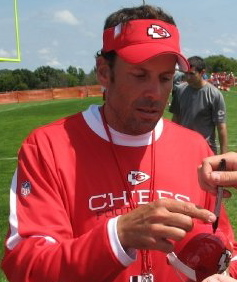
Todd Haley

Will Ludwigsen

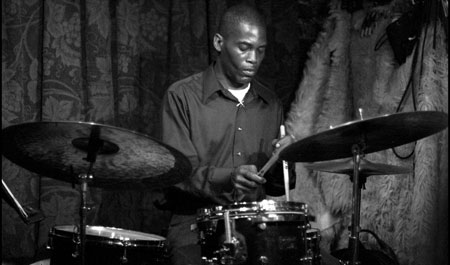
Robert M. Rucker

Doug Wamble

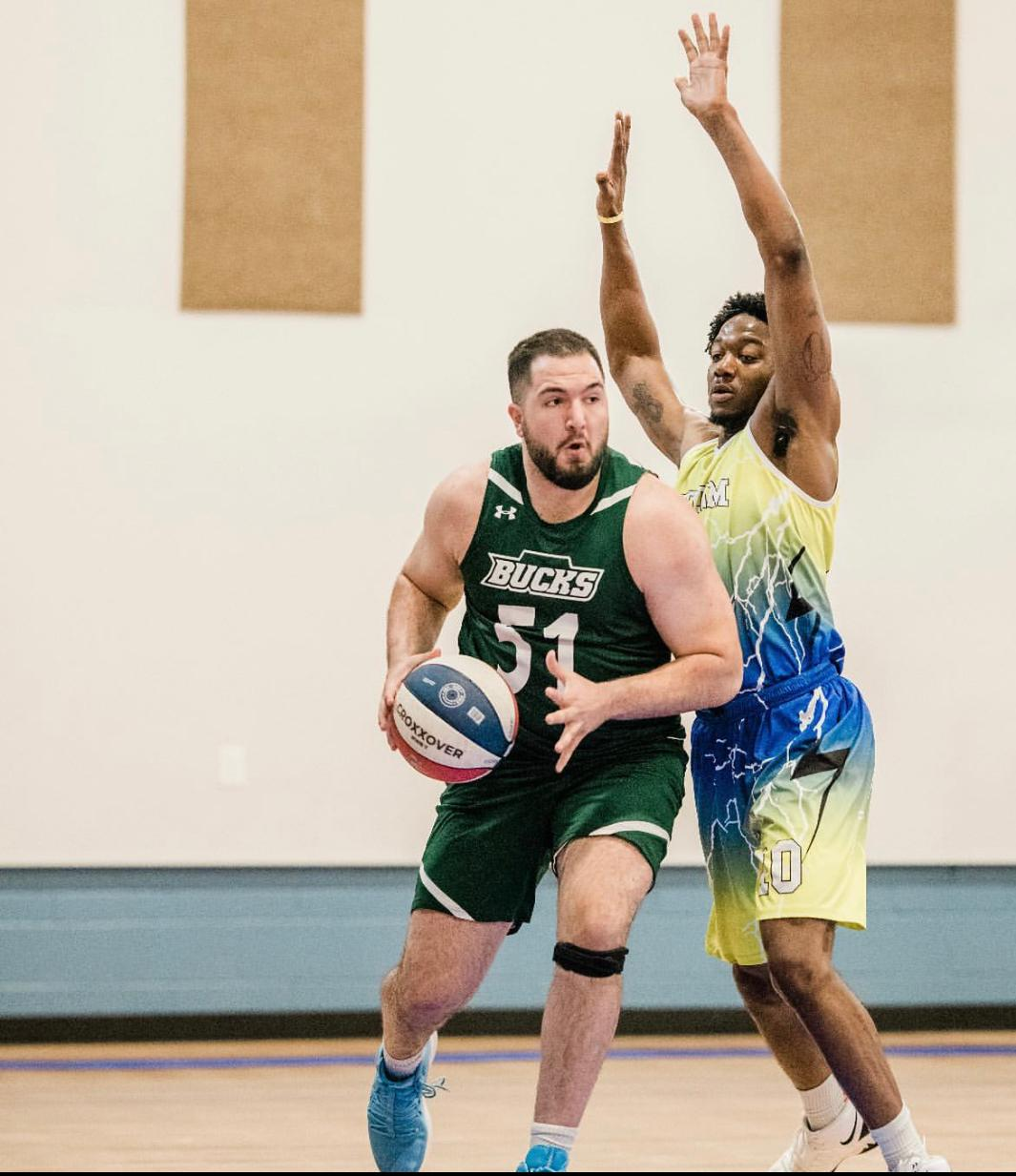
Laith Khalid Zalloum

== Photo gallery ==
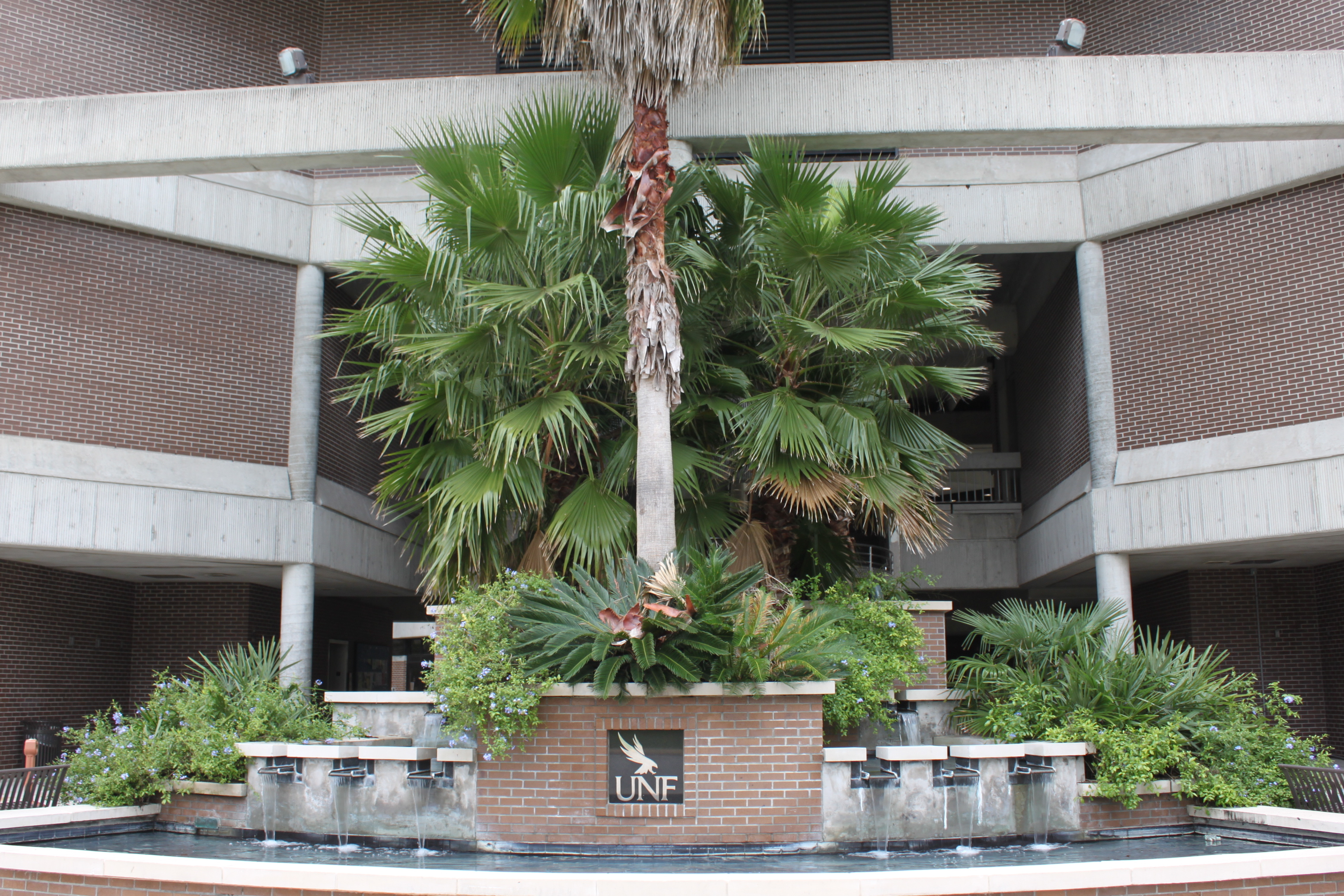
Fountain in front of JJ Daniel Hall

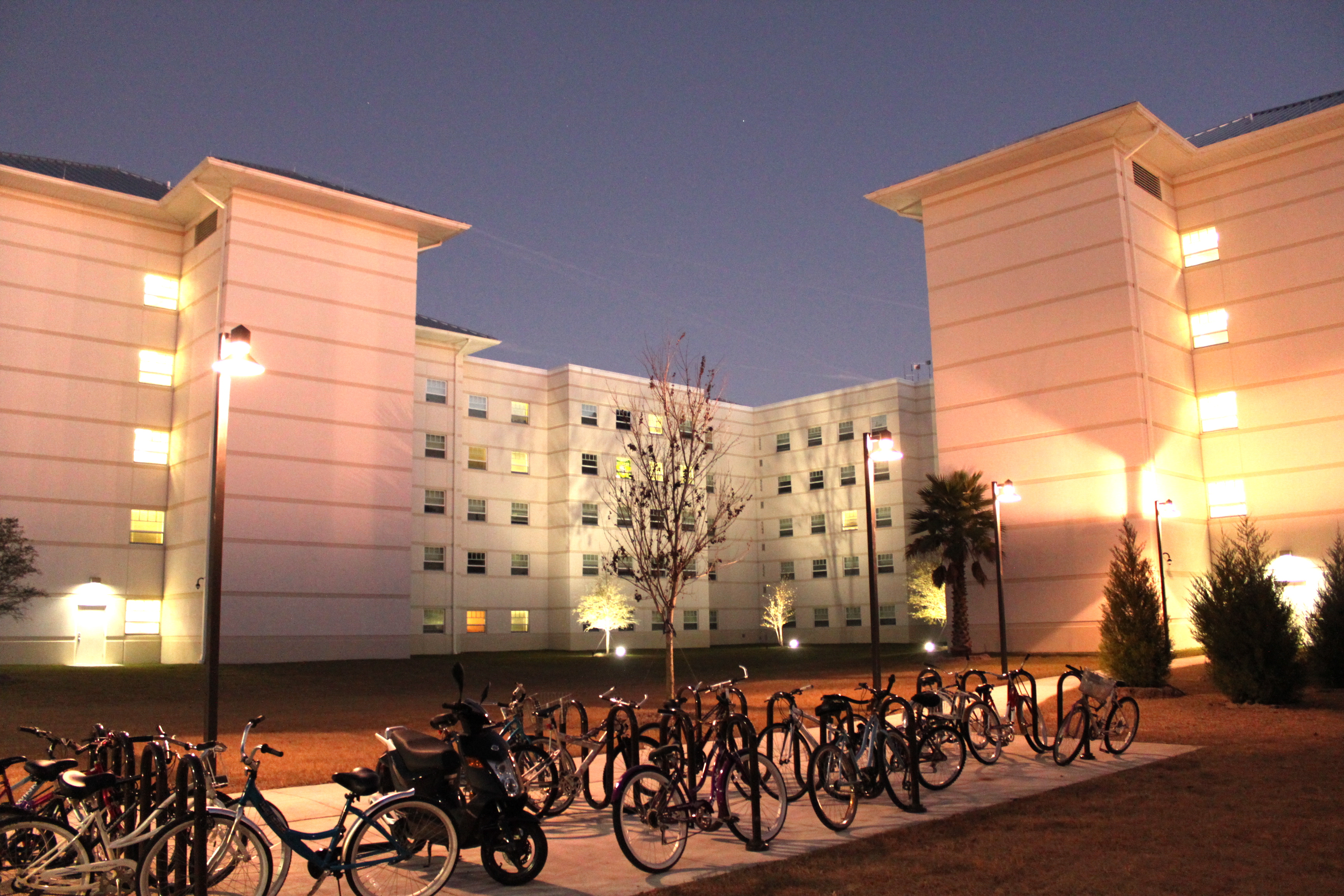
Osprey Fountains

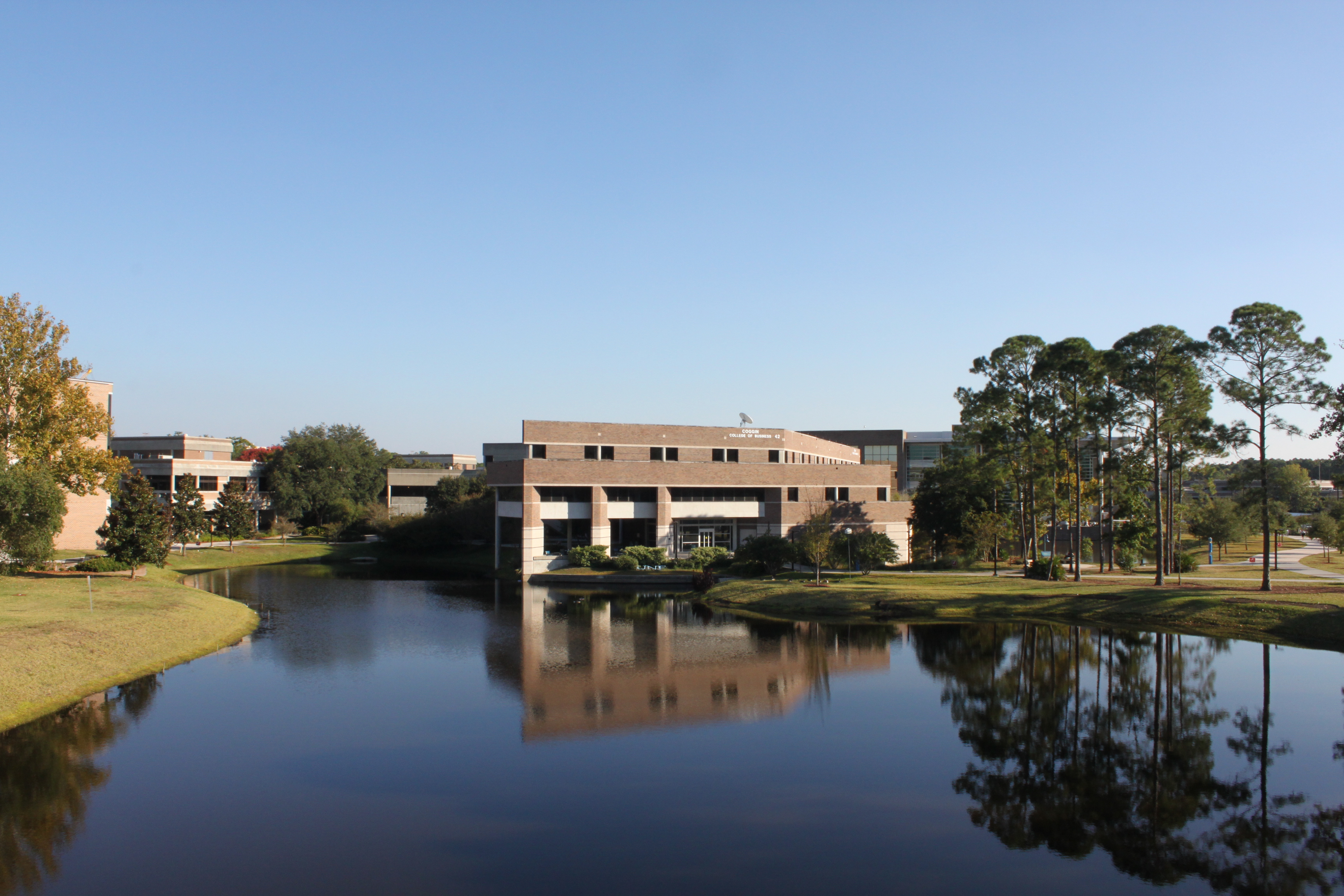
View from Student Union Boathouse of Coggin College of Business

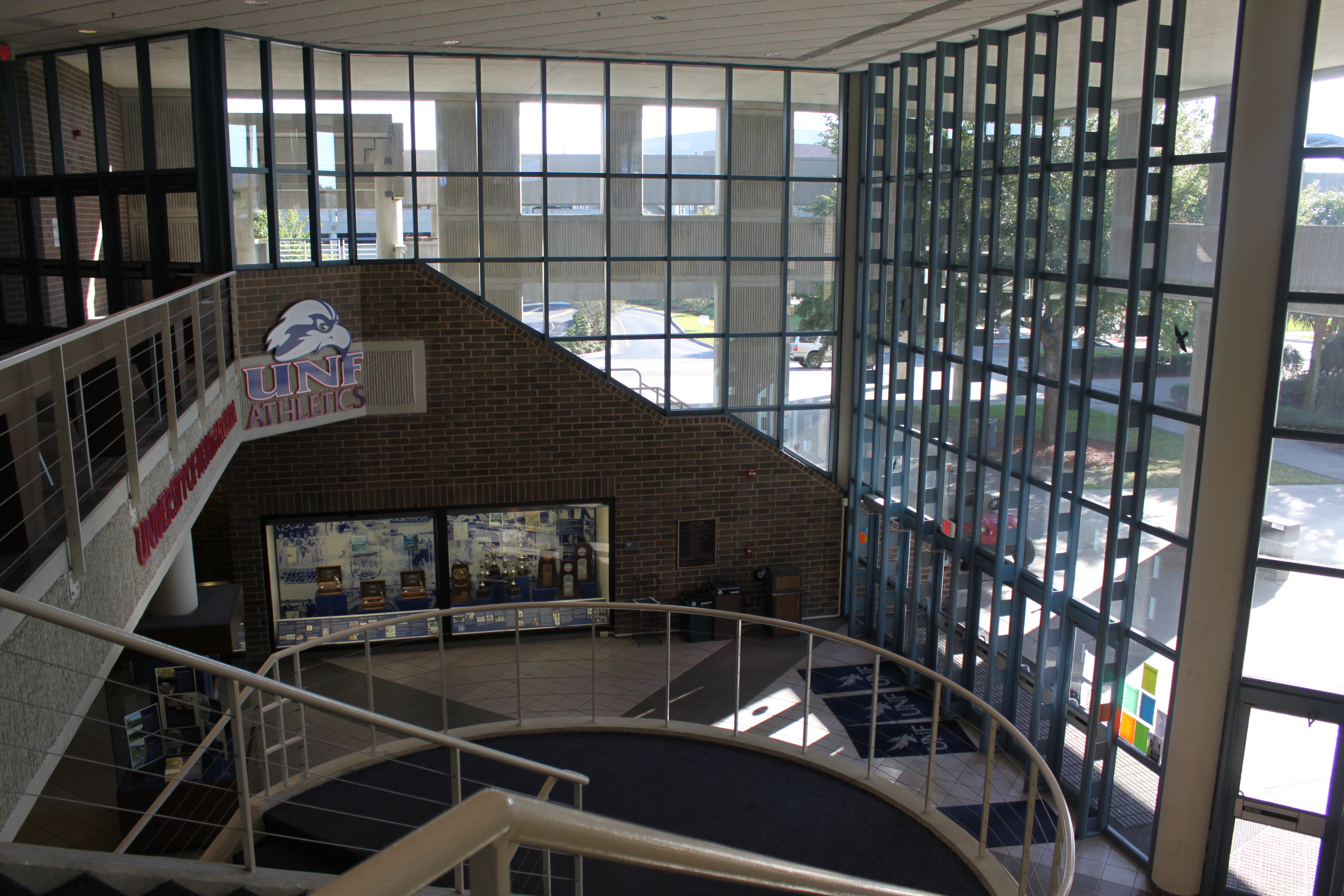
Inside UNF Arena

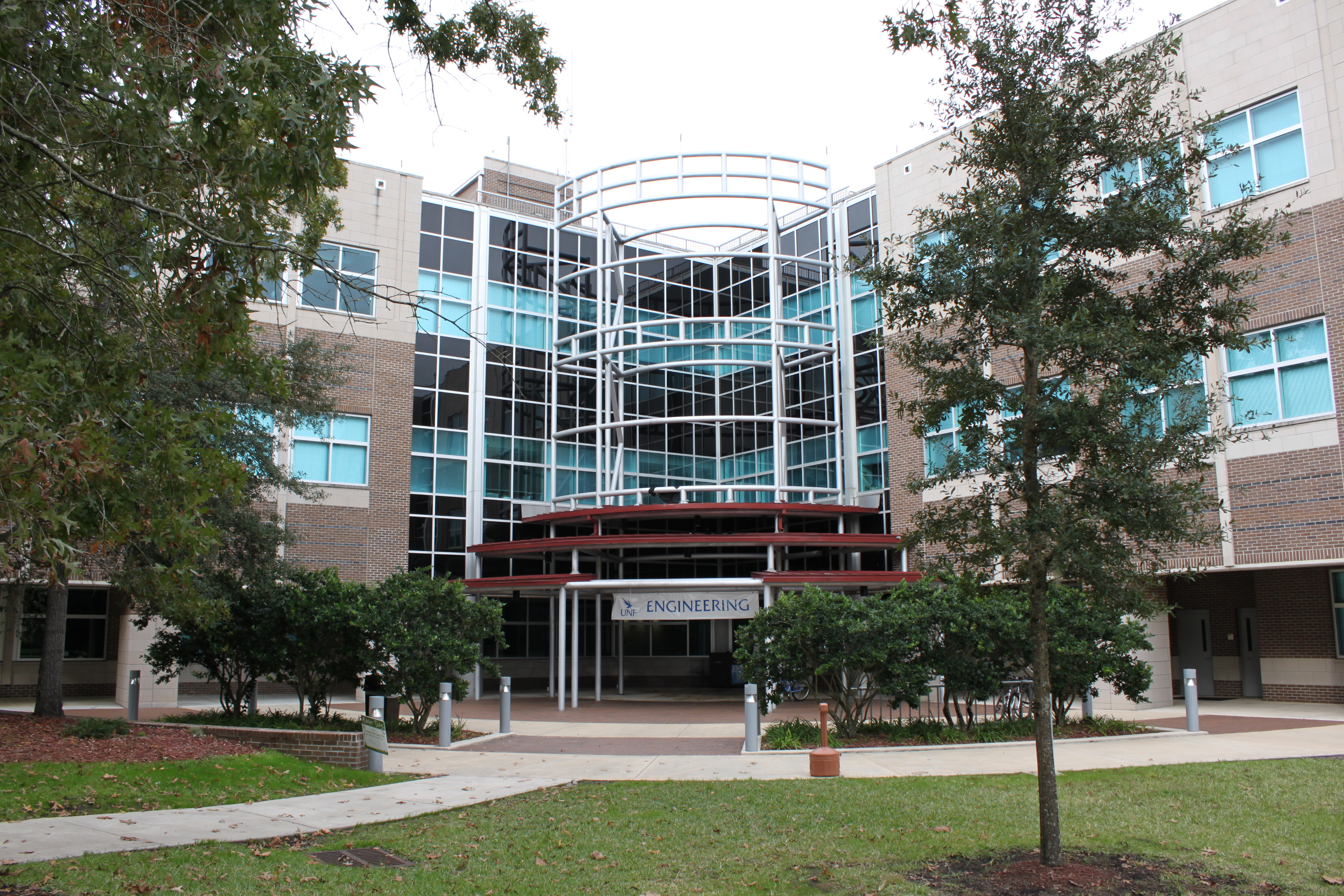
Science and Engineering Building

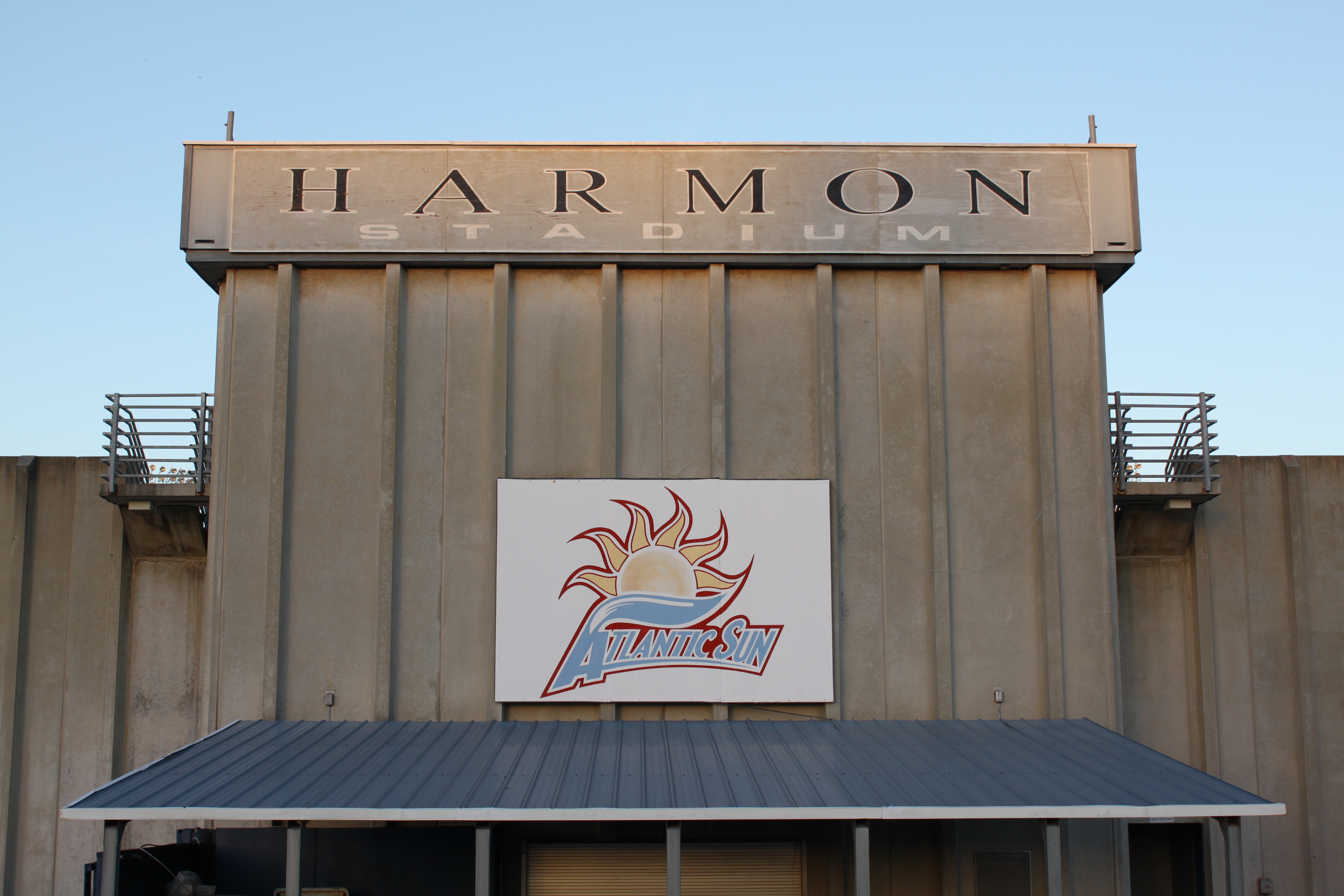
Front of Harmon Stadium

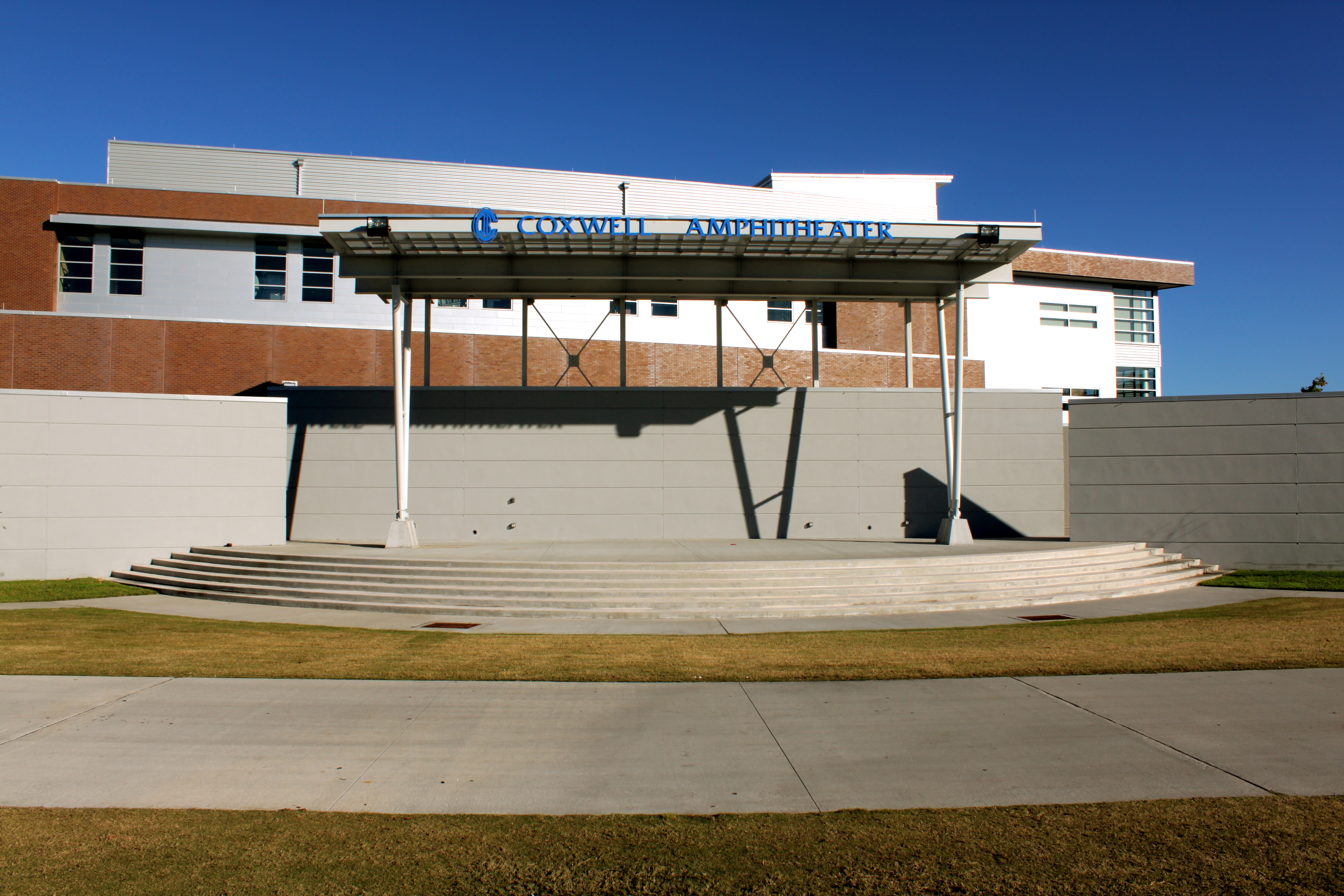
Coxwell Amphitheater

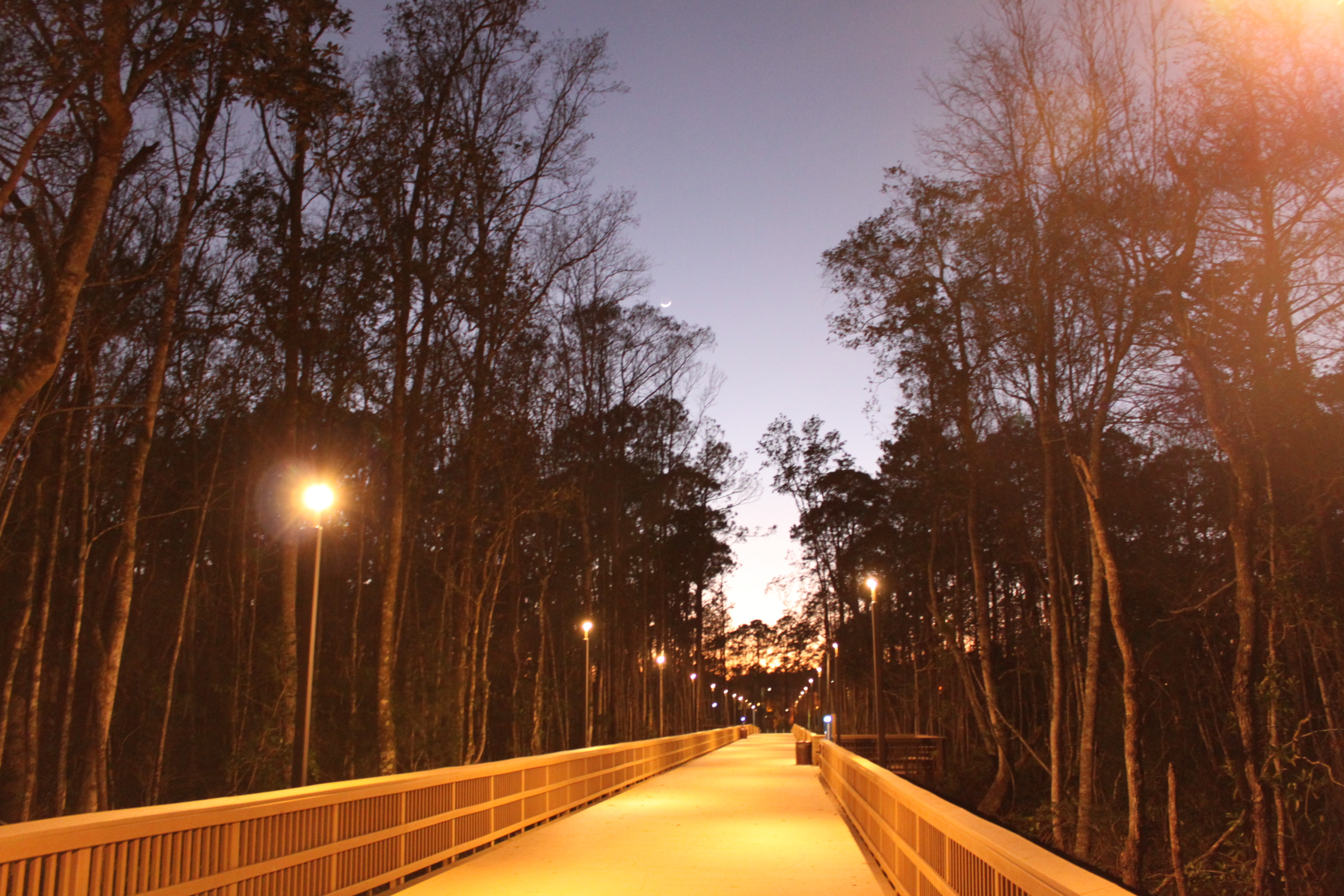
Osprey Fountains walkway

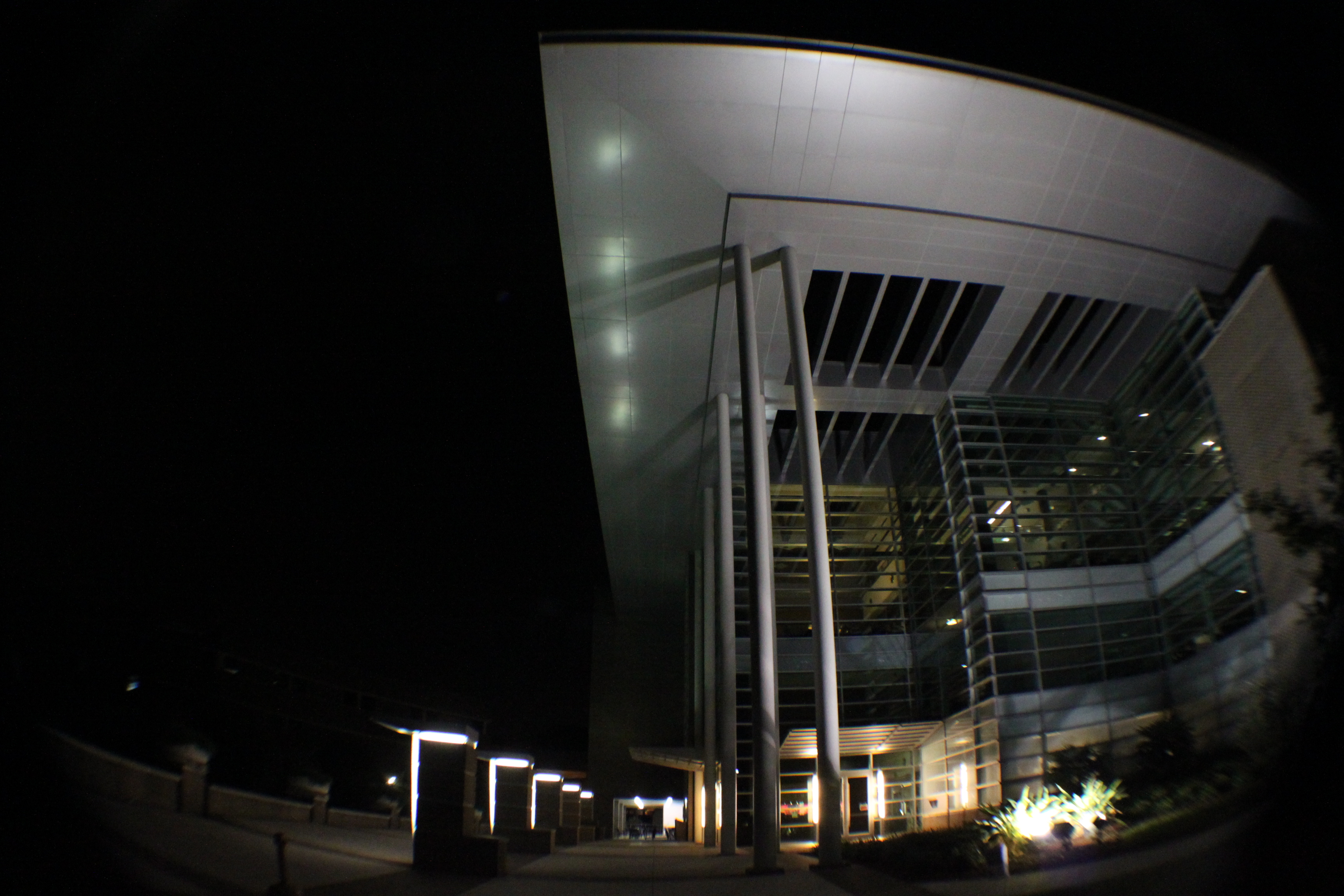
Thomas G. Carpenter Library

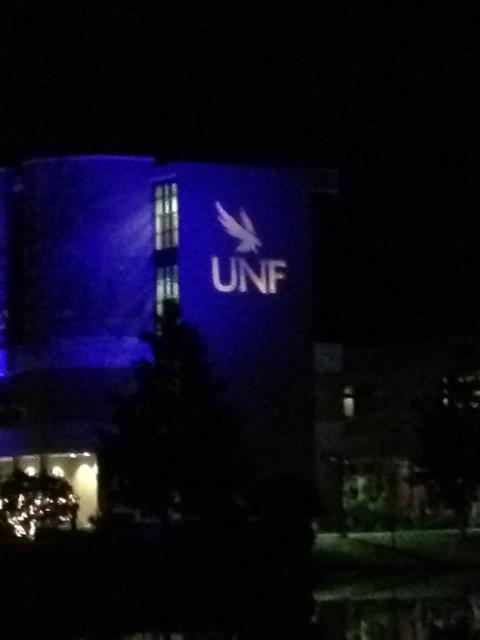
UNF logo on Brooks Brown Hall
