= Elements (band) =

American jazz fusion band

- Genres: Jazz, jazz fusion, new-age
- Years active: 1982–c. 1990's
- Labels: Antilles, Novus, Wavetone
- Members: Mark Egan; Danny Gottlieb; Clifford Carter; Bill Evans; Gil Goldstein; Steve Khan

Elements was an American jazz fusion ensemble founded by bass guitarist Mark Egan and drummer Danny Gottlieb in 1982. Egan and Gottlieb were members of the Pat Metheny Group, and Elements' sound drew from their experience. Band members included Bill Evans, Gil Goldstein, Steve Khan and Clifford Carter. Elements was apparently last active in the mid-1990s. In 2019, Gottlieb and Egan continued to record together (in a more-traditional jazz style) under their own names.

== Discography ==
- 1982 Elements (Philo)
- 1984 Forward Motion (Antilles)
- 1985 Blown Away (Mesa/Bluemoon)
- 1987 Illumination (Novus)
- 1989 Liberal Arts (Novus)
- 1990 Spirit River (Novus)
- 1992 Far East, Vol. 1 (Wavetone)
- 1995 Far East, Vol. 2 (Wavetone)
- 1996 Untold Stories (Wavetone)

David Mann, not Bill Evans, played sax on Far East, Vol. 1 and Far East, Vol. 2.
