= Coggin College of Business =

Business school of University of North Florida

Coordinates: 30.27026°N 81.50859°W

- Type: Public business school
- Established: 1972; 54 years ago
- Parent institution: University of North Florida
- Dean: Richard J. Buttimer, Jr.
- Faculty: 101
- Students: 2,850 (2024)
- Location: Jacksonville, Florida, United States
- Website: www.unf.edu/coggin/

The Coggin College of Business is the business school of the University of North Florida, a public research university in Jacksonville, Florida. About 2,850 students are enrolled in the college, including undergraduate and graduate students. It is one of UNF's three original colleges. Two of the college's programs, the international business program and the transportation and logistics program, are designated as flagship programs at UNF.

Coggin is accredited by the AACSB. It was named the Coggin College of Business in 2002 honoring Luther and Blanch Coggin, after a $5 million gift. As of 2025, the college has over 13,500 alumni.

== Academics ==
The college offers both undergraduate and graduate degrees in multiple areas of study.

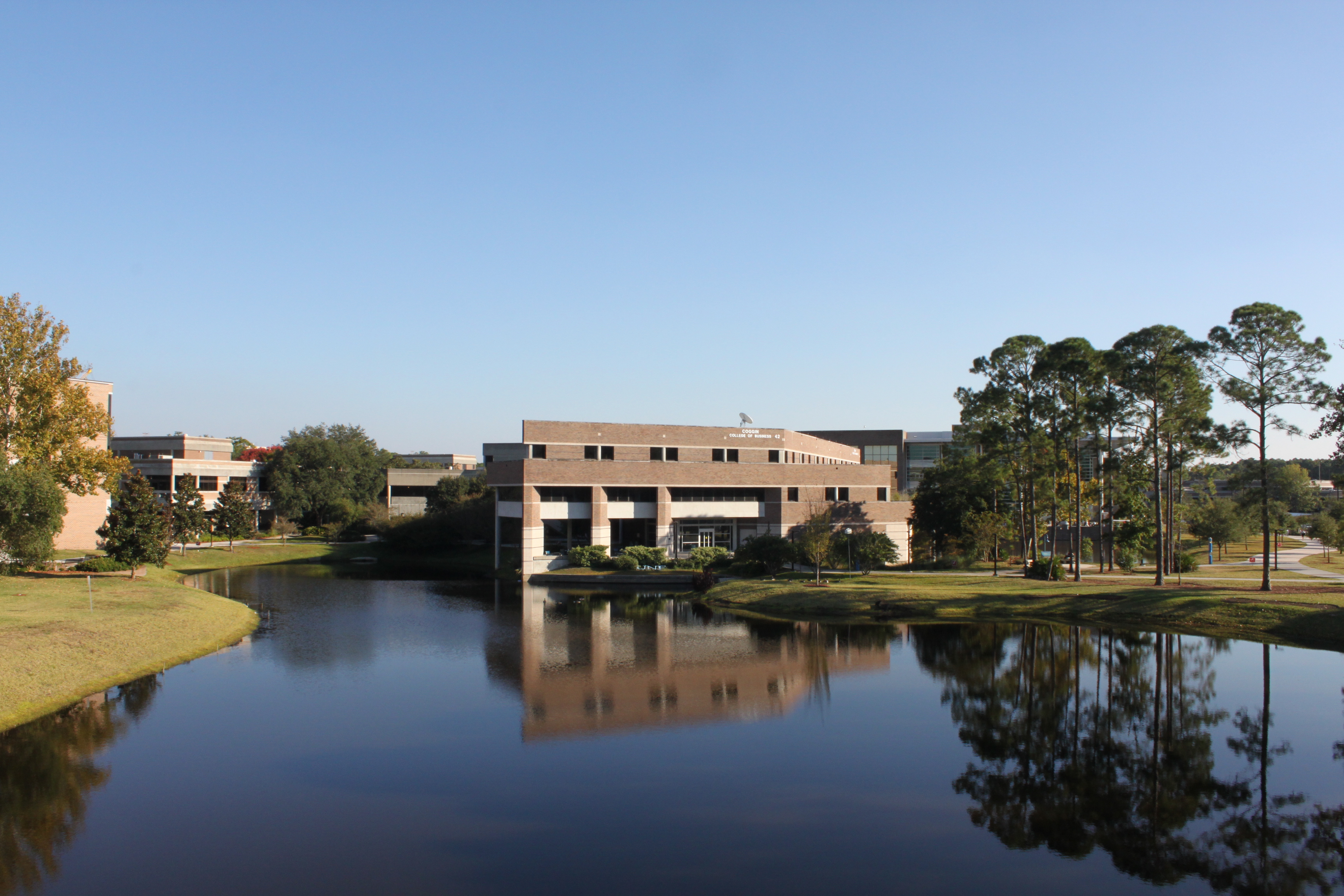
View of the college from the Student Union Boathouse.

Undergraduates pursue the Bachelor of Business Administration degree, for which various major and minor fields of study are offered.

Graduates have three available degree programs: Master of Accountancy, Master of Business Administration, and Master of Science. The college also offers a graduate certificate in e-Business.

== Student organizations ==
The Osprey Financial Group is the college's student managed investment fund. The group is a combination class/student organization; over the course of two semesters selected students are given the opportunity to manage a real portfolio of investments. Students gain real world money management experience as well as experience in using investment tools. The group is housed in the State Farm Companies Foundation Center for Financial Research in the Coggin Business Administration Building.

Additionally, Coggin is also host to many subject specific clubs and organizations, including:

- Alpha Kappa Psi
- Alpha Sigma Pi
- American Marketing Association
- Delta Sigma Pi
- Rotaract
- Beta Gamma Sigma Business Honor Society.

== Study abroad and international partners ==
The Coggin College of Business offers numerous opportunities for students to study abroad. One option is short term faculty lead trips usually around 10 days in length. Another is semester long exchanges in countries such as UAE, UK, China, Argentina, and Germany among others. Dual degree programs are also available. Undergraduates can earn dual degrees with UNF and KEDGE Business School in France. Graduate students have available the GlobalMBA program. In this program students spend one semester each at four universities: The Technical University of Cologne in Germany, Kyungpook National University in South Korea, the University of Warsaw in Poland, and UNF. Upon completion students earn an MBA from UNF and a Master of International Management and Intercultural Communication jointly from the University of Warsaw and the Technical University of Cologne.

== Business centers ==
Coggin business centers focus on research in different subjects to provide a diverse range of business data to the Jacksonville community.

- Coggin Center for Entrepreneurship and Innovation, located in downtown Jacksonville.
- Center for International Business Studies, part of the flagship international business program.
- Local Economic Indicators Project, economic research focusing on Jacksonville and the state of Florida as well as US and world trends.
- Small Business Development Center, part of the Florida SBDC network and the National Association of Small Business Development Centers.

== Facility ==
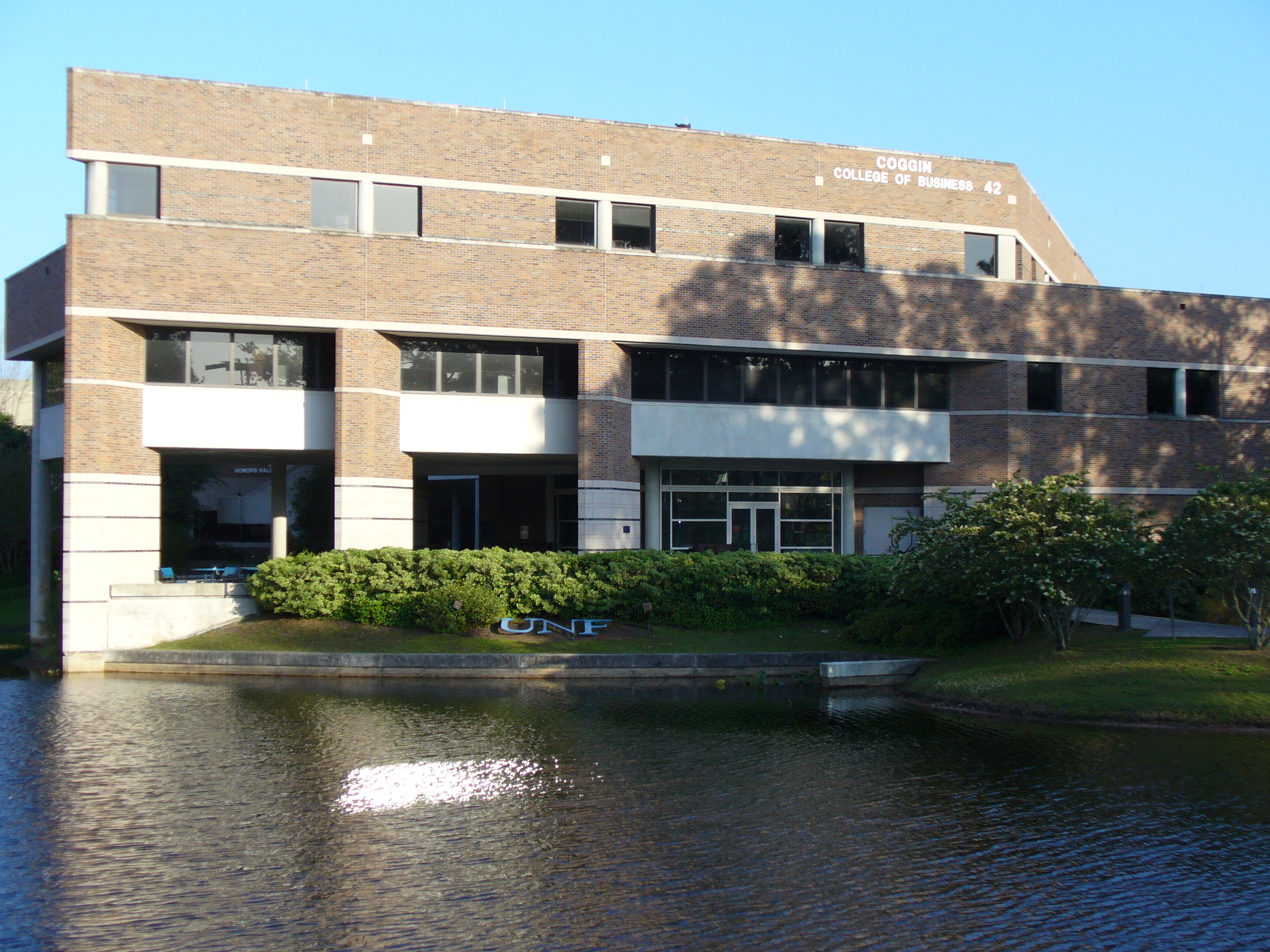

The Coggin College of Business Administration building (or building 42) is the home of the college. The 60,000-square-foot (5,600 m^{2}) facility has fourteen classrooms (with capacities of 36-54), an auditorium, three business technology classrooms, five student skills labs, and a special Trading Room for student Investment Analysts of the Osprey Financial Group. The facility houses numerous administrative and professor's offices as well as the Career Management Center, offering internship and career services exclusively for Coggin students. The building opened in 1996 at a cost of $7.8 million.
