= University of North Florida School of Music =

Music department of the University of North Florida

- Type: Public
- Established: 1972
- Location: Jacksonville, Florida, United States
- Website: Official Website

The University of North Florida School of Music is the music department of the University of North Florida, and one of the institution's flagship programs. Part of UNF's College of Arts and Sciences, it offers seven programs of study, the most noted of which is the jazz studies program, founded by the jazz euphonium player Rich Matteson in 1987. The department has several ensembles, including the Jazz Ensemble 1, which has performed at jazz festivals across the United States and internationally and has won several awards and been recognized in Down Beat Magazine, Cadence, and the Jazz Times.

== Fine Arts Center ==
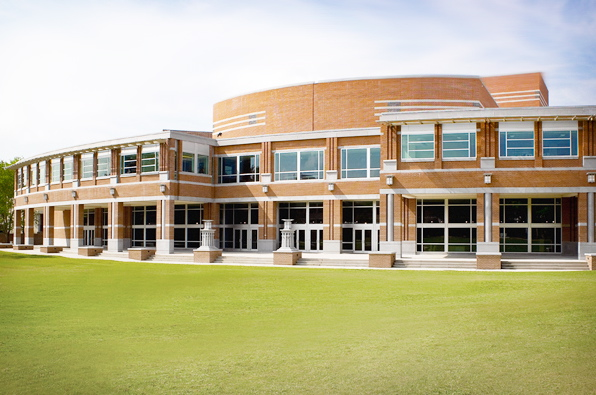
Fine Arts Center

The UNF School of Music is housed in the Fine Arts Center on campus. It was opened in 2001 at a cost of $22 million. The complex comprises the 1,400 seat Lazzara Performance Hall, a 200-seat recital hall, 44 individual practice rooms, and 4 large rehearsal rooms. The Lazzara Performance Hall hosts performances throughout the year from national and international acts.

== Faculty ==
- Clarence Hines - School of Music Director, Jazz Trombone, Jazz Composing and Arranging
- Brass
  - Randy Tinnin - Brass Area Coordinator, Trumpet
  - Marc Dickman - Low Brass, Jazz Ensemble III
  - James Jenkins - Tuba
  - Kevin Karabell - Trumpet
  - Casey Maday - Trombone
  - Kevin Reid - Horn
- Conducting
  - Erin Bodnar - Director of Bands
  - Courtney Lewis
  - Cara Tasher - Director of Choral Studies, Voice
- Jazz Studies
  - J.B. Scott - Area Coordinator, Trumpet, Jazz Ensemble I, GAJS Coordinator
  - Lynne Arriale - Piano, Jazz Combos
  - Ray Callender - Trumpet
  - Todd DelGiudice - Saxophone
  - Michael Emmert - Saxohphone
  - Scott Giddens - Piano
  - Danny Gottlieb - Drumset, Jazz Combos
  - Barry Greene - Guitar
  - James Hogan - Guitar
  - Dennis Marks - Bass, Jazz Ensemble II
  - Dave Steinmeyer - Jazz Trombone, Adjunct
- Music Education
  - Timothy J. Groulx - Area Coordinator
  - Julie Song
  - Mara Eichin
- Music Technology & Production
  - Joshua Tomlinson - Area Coordinator
  - Alex Hayward
- Percussion
  - Andrea Venet - Area Coordinator
  - Kenneth Every
  - Kevin Garry
- Piano
  - Erin K. Bennett - Area Coordinator
  - Cameron Bainger
  - Michael Mastronicola
  - Gary Smart
- Strings
  - Nick Curry - Area Coordinator, Cello
  - Melissa Barrett - Violin
  - Christopher Chappell - Violin
  - Grace Bahng Gavin - Cello
  - Simon Shiao - Violin, Viola
  - Paul Strasshofer - Bass
- Theory/Musicology
  - Stephen Gosden - Area Coordinator, Theory
  - Sarah Caissie Provost, Musicology
  - Stephanie Magnus, Theory, Musicology
  - Timothy Murray - Musicology
  - Michael Taylor - Theory, Music Technology & Production
  - Michael Vincent - Musicology
- Voice
  - James Hall - Area Coordinator
  - Dina Barone
  - John Daugherty
  - Brittany Fouché
  - Marilyn Smart
- Woodwinds
  - Michael Bovenzi - Area Coordinator
  - Ann Adams - Oboe
  - Lee Goodhew - Bassoon
  - Patrick Graham - Clarinet
  - Gia Sastre - Flute
  - Sunshine Simmons - Clarinet
  - Sarah Young - Flute
- Professor Emeriti
  - Bunky Green - Jazz Studies
  - Charlotte Mabrey - Percussion
  - William Prince - Jazz Studies

== Great American Jazz Series ==
Throughout the year, UNF hosts jazz artists in a concert series known as the Great American Jazz Series. Typically, the visiting artists will spend the week leading up to the concert in residence at the school, giving several clinics and master classes throughout the week.

Some past GAJS artists include Wynton Marsalis, Pat Martino, Eddie Gómez, Jimmy Cobb, Mike Stern, Dave Weckl, Dave Brubeck, Herbie Hancock, Joe Henderson, Michael Brecker, Vanguard Jazz Orchestra, Arturo Sandoval, Pat Metheny, Yellowjackets, Dave Holland, Kevin Mahogany, Jimmy Heath, Bela Fleck and the Flecktones, and many others.
