= Danny Gottlieb =

American drummer (born 1953)

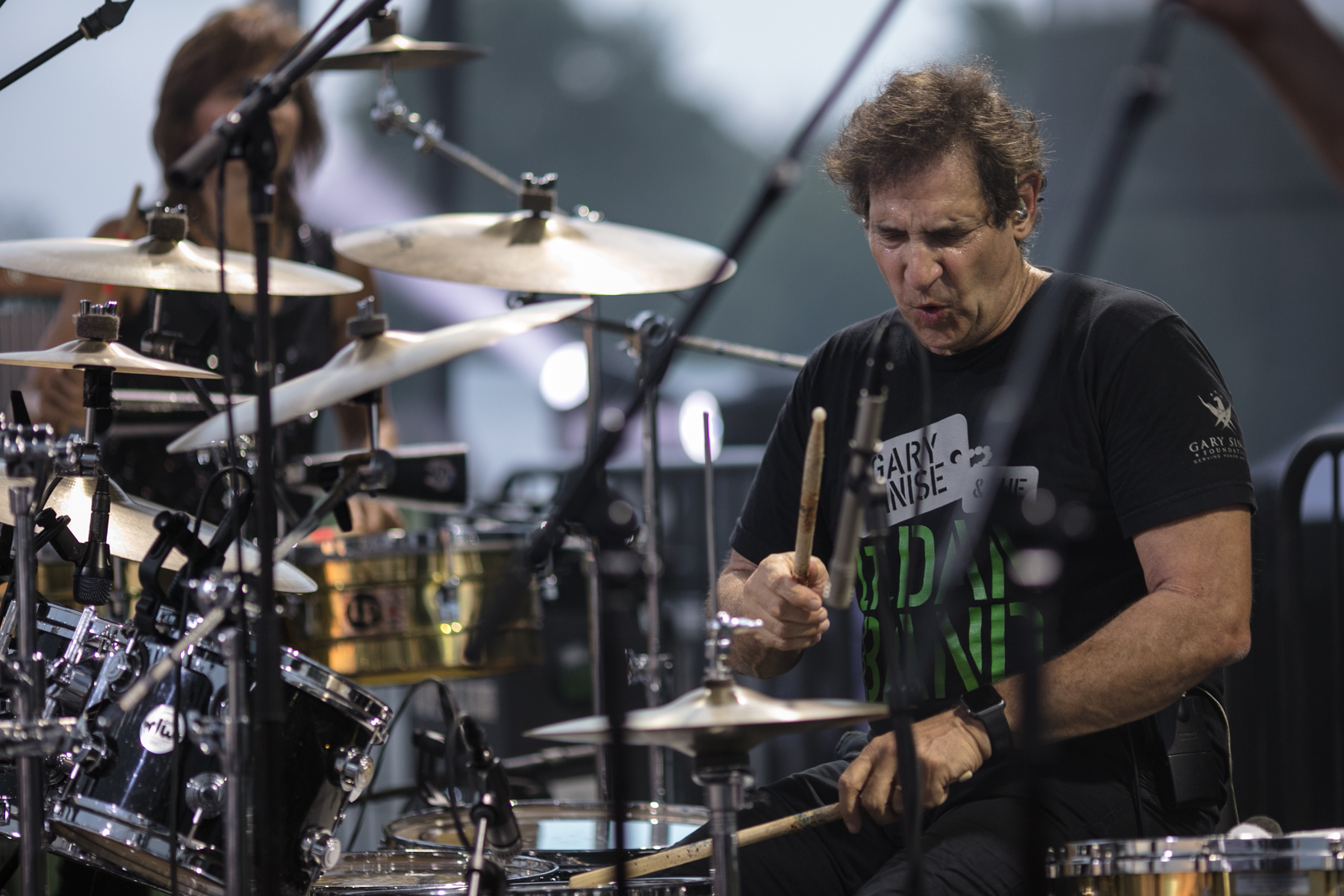
- Gottlieb in 2017

Background information
- Birth name: Daniel Richard Gottlieb
- Born: April 18, 1953 (age 72); New York City, United States
- Genres: Jazz, jazz fusion, rock, pop
- Occupation(s): Musician, educator
- Instrument(s): Drums, percussion
- Years active: 1976–present
- Labels: Antilles, BMG, Wavetone, Atlantic, Nicolosi

Daniel Richard Gottlieb (born April 18, 1953) is an American drummer. He was a founding member of the Pat Metheny Group and was co-founder of Elements with Mark Egan.

== Biography ==
Gottlieb was born in New York City on April 18, 1953. He took lessons from Mel Lewis and Joe Morello and graduated from the University of Miami in 1975. Morello was his lifelong teacher, beginning in 1968 and through the late 1990s. He became a member of the Gary Burton Quartet in 1976 with Pat Metheny. He was one of the original members of The Pat Metheny Group from 1977 to 1983. Bassist Mark Egan was also in Metheny's first group. Egan and Gottlieb formed the band Elements.

In 1982, Gottlieb toured with Flora Purim and Airto Moreira. Gottlieb played with singer Michael Franks in 1983, and the following year toured with trumpeter Randy Brecker and saxophonist Stan Getz. From 1984-1986, he was a member of the Mahavishnu Orchestra led by guitarist John McLaughlin and is featured in the video live at Montreux. He is also featured on the recording Adventures in Radioland. He was also part of the band Second Story Television in 1985 and was a regular member of Gil Evans' orchestra from 1986 until Evans died two years later. Gottlieb is featured on a variety of recordings with the band, including Bud and Bird and the 75th Birthday Concert.

Gottlieb visited Germany on several occasions beginning in 1991, and performed with the WDR Big Band along with Bob Brookmeyer, George Gruntz, and Dino Saluzzi. During the mid-1990s he was part of less jazz-oriented and more vocal-based performances by groups such as Booker T. & the M.G.'s and The Manhattan Transfer.

Gottlieb is currently on faculty at the University of North Florida School of Music and performs with the Lt. Dan Band.
