= Earl May =

American jazz bassist (1927–2008)

Earl Charles Barrington May (September 17, 1927 – January 4, 2008) was an American jazz bassist. Allmusic described him as "one of the most prodigious and prolific bassists of the postwar era".

== Early life ==
May was born in New York City on September 17, 1927. He "played left-handed on an instrument strung for a right-handed player". He spent part of his youth in Harlem, before moving to the Bronx with his mother. His earliest music influences came from his family. His father, Vernon May, was a classically trained vocalist who took May along with him to his rehearsals. Alongside this, his extended family lived in Jamaica, Queens, where he discovered he wanted to play music. As a child, he played the drums and changed to the acoustic bass at the age of 14. He studied rigorously at Benjamin Franklin High School on Manhattan's Eastside. He further refined his skills in places like Minton’s Playhouse, where he met many influential musicians and would occasionally sub in for bass.

In 1949, he tools his first professional gig in the Bronx at the 845 Club. He was then noticed by drummer Connie Kay, who invited him to play with saxophonist Lester Young at the Audubon Ballroom. In 1951 Dr. Billy Taylor offered him a spot in his trio, which prompted May to leave his insurance job and become a full-time musician.

== Playstyle ==
As a left-handed player, May rejected the typical approach of playing with his non-dominant hand to become a ‘Back-to-Front’ bassist. May’s rebellion was prominent, stating that "I would play right-handed. And when he wouldn’t look I would play left handed. Then he would stop the band — ‘get on the other side!’ So it took me a while before I decided, well I don’t know what side to stand on, I’m more comfortable playing left handed, but I’d never heard of a left handed bass player. But I decided to just stay [with playing back-to-front] and make myself comfortable."

He adapted full-time to this playstyle in his time with Billy Taylor, influenced by the burden traveling put on him. This playstyle limited his ability to learn under other great bassists, Fred Zimmerman included. The prominent school of thought present at the time was that “the only way to play bass was right handed.”

May played on a modified upright bass (nicknamed Coltrane), with the fingerboard modified to have an even curvature and no ridge under the E-string. These modifications are suspected to have aided the idiodexterity of his playstyle. Charles Mingus, who served as a coach to May, sourced this instrument for him. Stating that he wanted an instrument that ‘has a really good sound and that you always record with, so that your sound is always the same’. After his time under Mingus, May remarked "Mingus was a great teacher. I learned so much from him. Once when I played with Milt Jackson and Dizzy in France, Mingus was standing in the wings and said with pride, 'He's my student.'"

This playstyle may have had a physical impact on his instrumentation as well as his sound, due to the nature by which he had to navigate his instrument. Due to the proximity of the heaviest strings to May’s fingering hand, adds clarity to his low notes, without an impact on their ‘depth’ or loudness. In the rare footage of him playing, he is also commonly seen doubling the fingers of his picking hand. He maintained a noticeably uptight posture, even in his older ages of playing, likely due to methods such as an inversion table which he used to counter the impact of lugging around his instrument from years of gigging.

== Later life and career ==
Until 1951, May had a job in insurance while playing in clubs at night. During this period, he played with Miles Davis, Lester Young, Gene Ammons, Sonny Stitt, and Mercer Ellington. He was also taught by Charles Mingus in the early 1950s. Through most of the 1950s he played in a trio with Billy Taylor, and also worked in the late 1950s with John Coltrane and Chet Baker.

From 1959 to 1963 he played behind vocalist Gloria Lynne, and in the 1960s he also worked with Dave McKenna, Herman Foster, Shirley Scott, Stanley Turrentine, Herbie Mann, Mose Allison, and Earl Hines. In the early 1970s he began playing electric bass in addition to the double-bass, and played in that decade with Dizzy Gillespie, Johnny Hartman, Joe Newman, Archie Shepp, Frank Foster, Mickey Tucker, and Ruby Braff.

In the 1980s he did work with musicals both on Broadway and on tour, including Sophisticated Ladies and Big Deal, in addition to work with George Benson early in the decade and Charles Brown later in the decade. Credits in the 1990s and 2000s included work with Dave Van Ronk, Doc Cheatham, Benny Waters, Marlena Shaw, Irvin Stokes, a trio with Jane Jarvis and Benny Powell, Eddie Locke, Charles McPherson, and the international tour of the Statesmen of Jazz. May died of a heart attack in New York City on January 4, 2008.

== As a leader ==
Following his prolific and high-demand career as a bassist, May formed his own quintet in early 2000. Following an invite to play the Shanghai Jazz Club with trumpeter Spanky Davis, he began to enlist a crew of New York Jazz musicians whom he knew.

Once assembled, the group featured Catherine Russell on vocals, Larry Ham on piano, Eddie Locke on drums, and David Glasser on sax The group recorded one album, Live At Shanghai Jazz - introducing Catherine Russell, featuring a mix of original compositions, and some standards, including A Night In Tunisia. May remarked at the uniqueness of the quartets compositions. Their composition of new, younger players mixed with two old-time swingers gave them a “Modern Jazz Quartet kind of swing”. The addition of a vocalist was also seen as a big draw. May felt like it was the “icing on the cake when you present singers", as it changed the availability of sound, and allowed for the rhythm section to be featured more frequently in solos. Compared to traditional groups, in which melodic instruments are highlighted for solos, in his quintet “Everybody can be featured. The pianists can take a solo, the drummer can solo, and I can take a solo. It can be very interesting." May focused on maintaining a balance within his group, and prioritized the happiness of his members. He wanted a happy group and happy audience so that everyone could go home happy.

== Discography ==
=== As leader ===
- Swinging the Blues (Arbors, 2005)

=== As sideman ===
With Mose Allison

- Wild Man on the Loose (Atlantic, 1965)

With George Benson

- 20/20 (Warner Bros., 1985)

With Carmen Bradford

- Finally Yours (Amazing, 1992)

With Charles Brown

- One More for the Road (Blue Side, 1986)
- All My Life (Bulls Eye Blues, 1990)

With John Coltrane

- Lush Life (Prestige, 1961)
- The Last Trane (Prestige, 1966)

With Lou Donaldson

- Cole Slaw (Argo, 1964)

With Jean DuShon

- Make Way for Jean DuShon (Argo, 1964)

With Frank Foster

- Chiquito loco: Live at the Hnita Jazz Club (Bingo, 1979)

With Johnny Hartman

- Today (Perception, 1972)
- I've Been There (Perception, 1973)

With Jane Jarvis

- Atlantic/Pacific (Arbors, 1999)

With Herbie Mann

- Today! (Atlantic, 1965)
- Glory of Love (CTI, 1967)

With Billy Mitchell

- Now's the Time (Catalyst, 1976)

With Charlie Rouse

- Takin' Care of Business (Jazzland Records, 1961)

With Shirley Scott

- Soul Shoutin' (Prestige, 1963)

With Marlena Shaw

- Elemental Soul (Concord, 1997)

With Sonny Stitt

- For the Fat Man (Prestige, 1951)

With Irvin Stokes

- Just Friends (Arbors, 1999)

With Billy Taylor

- Lover (Prestige, 1952)
- Billy Taylor Trio (Prestige, 1955)
- The Billy Taylor Trio with Candido (Prestige, 1955)
- Billy Taylor Trio at Town Hall (Prestige, 1955)
- A Touch of Taylor (Prestige, 1955)
- Cross Section (Prestige, 1956)
- My Fair Lady Loves Jazz (ABC-Paramount, 1957)
- The New Billy Taylor Trio (ABC-Paramount, 1957)
- The Billy Taylor Touch (Atlantic, 1958)
- One for Fun (Atlantic, 1959)
- Taylor Made Jazz (Argo, 1959)

With Dave Van Ronk

- Hummin' to Myself (Gazell, 1990)

With Benny Waters

- Live at 95: A Birdland Birthday (Enja, 1997)
