= Griot (disambiguation) =

Griots are West African poets, who carry stories in the oral tradition accompanied by music.

Griot may also refer to:

- Ablaye Cissoko (b. 1970), known as "The Griot"
- Alfred Rosmer (1877–1964), born Alfred Griot, an American-born French Communist political activist and historian
- Griot (film), a 2011 film about Ablaye Cissoko made by Volker Goetze
- Griot (rapper), a Swiss rapper
- Griot (food), a Haitian marinated dish
- The Griot (film), a 2021 Nigerian film
- Griot (Marvel Cinematic Universe), a fictional artificial intelligence in the Black Panther films

== See also ==
- Griot Galaxy, former jazz band
- Griot Libertè, a 2004 album by bassist Buster Williams
- Griot lute, a musical instrument
- Urban Griot, an album by Billy Taylor
