= There's a Small Hotel =

Song from the musical On Your Toes

Song
- Published: 1937
- Composer: Richard Rodgers
- Lyricist: Lorenz Hart

"There's a Small Hotel" is a 1936 song composed by Richard Rodgers, with lyrics by Lorenz Hart. Originally written for but dropped from the musical Jumbo (1935), it was used in On Your Toes (1936), where it was introduced by Ray Bolger and Doris Carson, and repeated by Jack Whiting and Vera Zorina in the London West End production that opened on 5 February 1937, at the Palace Theatre.

Betty Garrett sang it in the 1948 film Words and Music, and it was interpolated in the film version of Pal Joey (1957) with a Frank Sinatra-Nelson Riddle collaboration.

== Background ==
According to the biography of Lorenz Hart by Gary Marmorstein, the song was inspired by a visit Hart made to the Stockton Inn in Stockton, New Jersey, accompanied by the bandleader Paul Whiteman. Hart "noted the wishing well outside the inn. Out of that visit emerged the lyric 'There's a Small Hotel', written to one of the few Rodgers melodies that annoyed Larry no end."

Another claimant to be the inspiration is the Montecito Inn, in Santa Barbara County, California. Renovations to the hotel in the 1950s replaced the wishing well, claimed to be mentioned in the song, with a floral fountain.

== Lyric confusion ==
The second verse begins with the line "There's no bridal suite". In many printed editions of the song this appears as "There's a bridal suite", undermining Hart's depiction of the hotel as unassuming. Many performers, including Frank Sinatra and Ella Fitzgerald, sing "a".

== In popular culture ==
The song was used by Rebecca Lenkiewicz as the basis of her 2025 play Small Hotel. The first production starred Ralph Fiennes, Francesca Annis and Rosalind Eleazar at the Theatre Royal, Bath. The song features throughout the play and the main protagonists are named Larry (Lorenz) and Richard in a nod to the songs original composers

== Notable recordings ==
- Hal Kemp And His Orchestra: "There's A Small Hotel"/"It's Got To Be Love" (Brunswick 7634, 1936) – Shellac 10", 78 RPM
- Jack Whiting: "There's A Small Hotel"/"On Your Toes" (Columbia CA 16274, 1937) – Shellac 10", 78 RPM
- Josephine Baker: "Plus Tard"/"C'est Un Nid Charmant" (Columbia 291179, 1937) – Shellac 10", 78 RPM; a version of the song with French lyrics, as "C'est Un Nid Charmant" was re-released on CD
- Claude Thornhill And His Orchestra: "There's a Small Hotel"/"Moonlight Bay" (Columbia 36725, 1942) – Shellac, 10", 78 RPM; with vocals by The Snowflakes, arranged by Gil Evans
- Stan Getz: Stan Getz Quartets (Prestige PRLP 7002, 1950)
- Hank Mobley: Newark 1953 (Uptown, 1953)
- Ginny Gibson: "The Song That Broke My Heart"/"There's a Small Hotel" (M-G-M 11814, 1954) – 45 rpm
- Bobby Van & Kay Coulter: On Your Toes (1954) – (1954 revival)
- Hank Jones: The Trio (Savoy, 1955)
- Chet Baker: Chet Baker in Europe (Pacific Jazz PJ 1218, 1956)
- Ella Fitzgerald: Ella Fitzgerald Sings the Rodgers & Hart Songbook (Verve, 1956)
- Sammy Davis Jr. and Carmen McRae - Boy Meets Girl (Decca, 1957)
- Frank Sinatra: Soundtrack of the film Pal Joey (Capitol, 1957) – the song was re-released on the compilation album Frank Sinatra Sings the Select Rodgers & Hart (Capitol, 1995)
- Johnny Smith: The Johnny Smith Foursome, Volume II (Royal Roost Records, 1957)
- Billy Taylor: The New Billy Taylor Trio (ABC-Paramount S-226, 1958)
- Dorothy Ashby: Hip Harp (Prestige, 1958)
- Petula Clark: Petula Clark in Hollywood (Pye NPL 18039, 1959)
- Della Reese: Della Della Cha-Cha-Cha (RCA, 1960)
- Billy Eckstine: Broadway, Bongos and Mr. B (Mercury SR 60637, 1961) – with the Hal Mooney Orchestra
- The Hi-Lo's: This Time It's Love (Columbia CL 1723/CS 8523, 1962)
- Billy Paul: Going East (Philadelphia International, 1971)
- Robert Clary: Robert Clary Sings Rodgers, Hart & Mercer (Original Cast 9770, 1997)
- June Christy: Friendly Session, Vol. 3 (Jasmine JASCD-369, 2000)
- Jane Monheit: Home (EmArcy, 2010)
- Bing Crosby sang it several times on his radio shows (June 29, 1944 with Marilyn Maxwell; February 28, 1946; March 14, 1946; April 25, 1954 with Toni Arden).
