= Justin Robinson (musician) =

American saxophonist (born 1968)

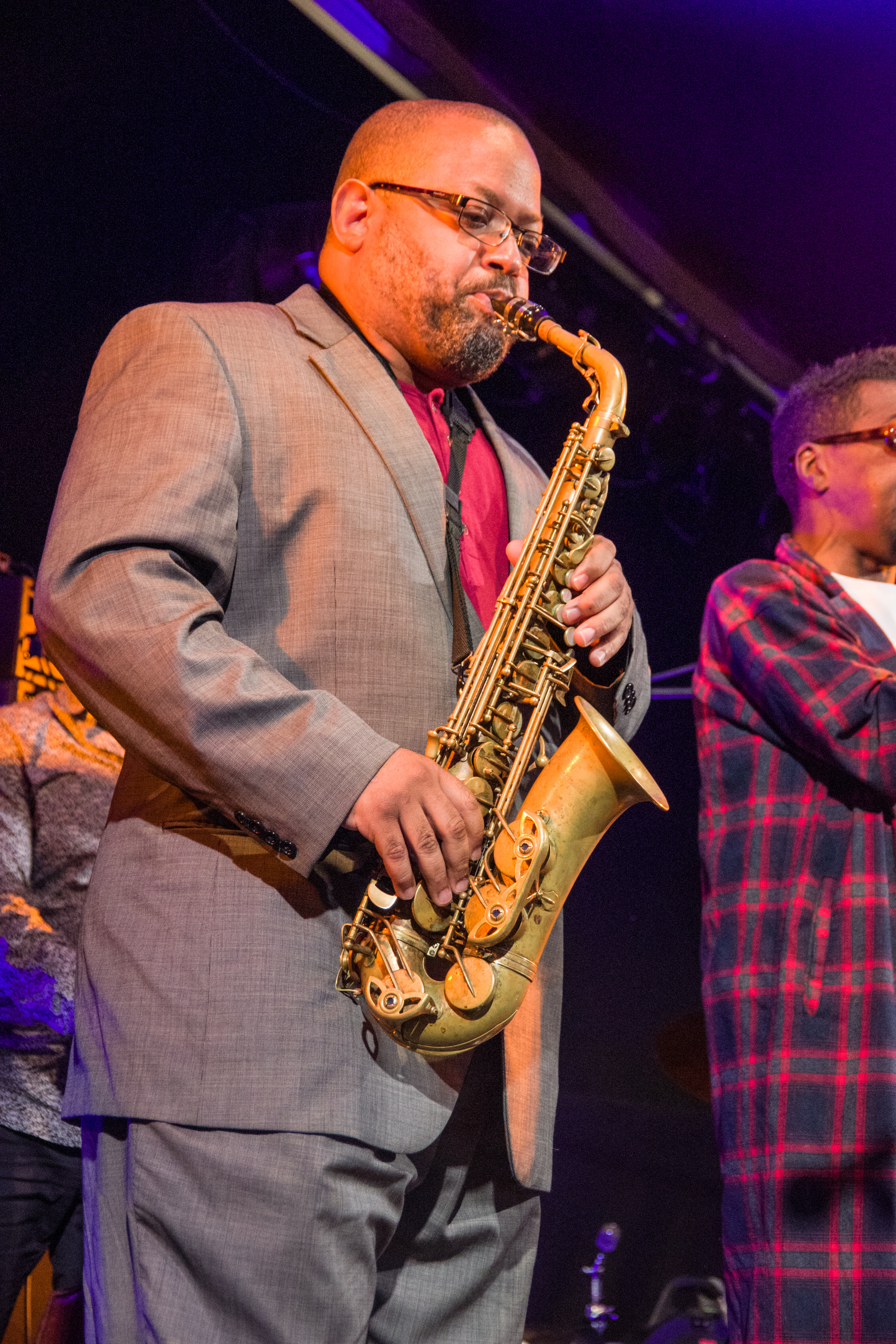
- Robinson in 2013

Background information
- Born: August 14, 1968 (age 58); Manhattan, New York, U.S.
- Genres: Jazz
- Occupation: Musician
- Instrument: Alto saxophone
- Years active: early-1990s–present
- Labels: Verve; Arabesque; WJ3; Criss Cross Jazz
- Formerly of: Carnegie Hall Jazz Band; Dizzy Gillespie All-Star Band; Roy Hargrove Big Band

Justin Robinson (born August 14, 1968) is an American jazz alto saxophonist. He has performed with artists such as Cecil Brooks III, the Harper Brothers (Phillip and Winard), Abbey Lincoln, Diana Ross, Jimmy Scott, and the Carnegie Hall Jazz Band, and the Dizzy Gillespie All-Star Band, and was a long-time member of the quintet and big band of trumpeter Roy Hargrove.

== Life and career ==
Robinson was born in Manhattan and first began playing saxophone at the age of 13, while attending LaGuardia High School of Music and Arts in New York City. His first influences were Charlie Parker and Jackie McLean.

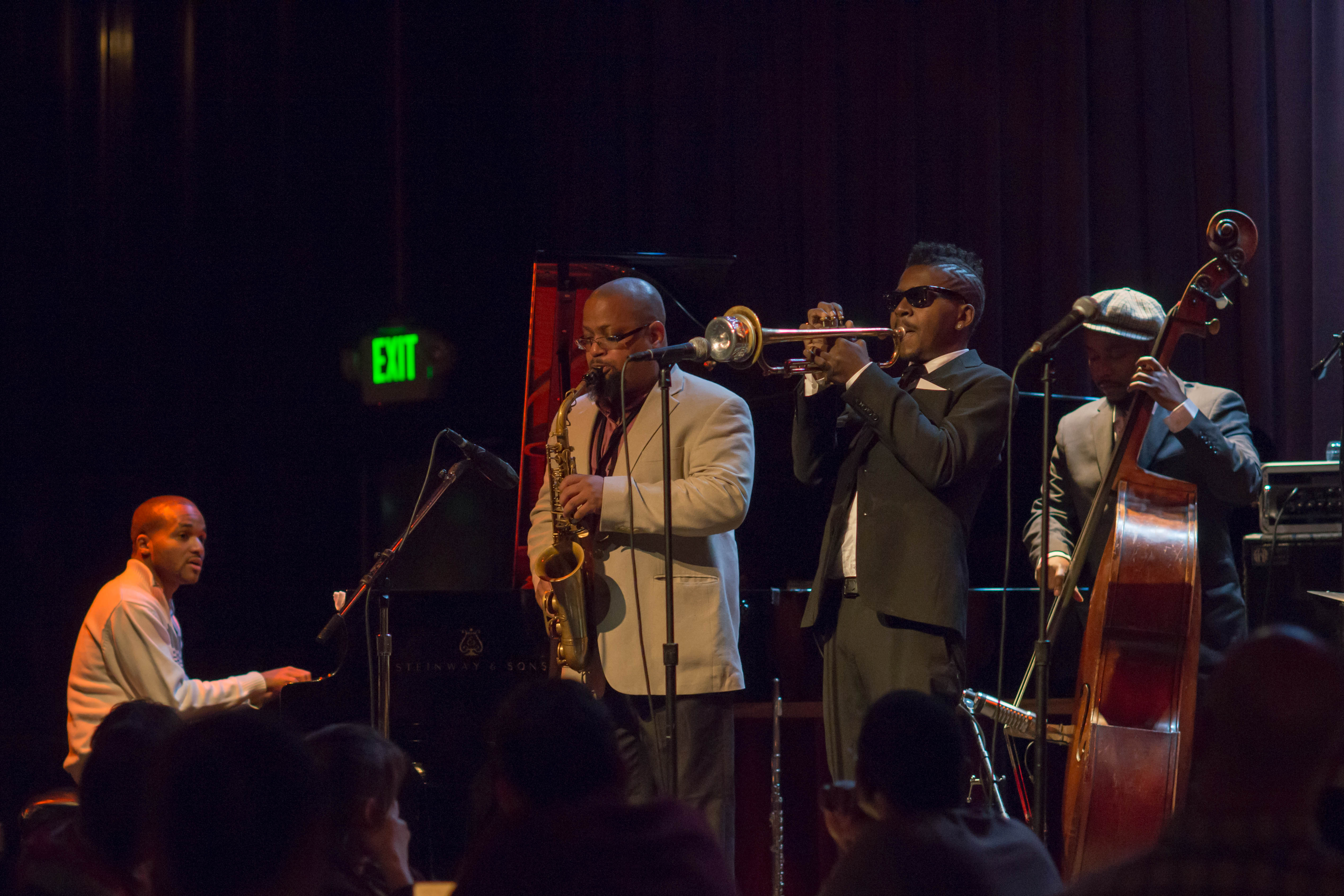
Robinson with Roy Hargrove's quintet at Dimitriou's Jazz Alley in 2013

He first stepped on the stage of the Village Gate in the show First Generations of Jazz. From 1984 to 1986, he belonged to the McDonald's High School Jazz Band where he met Philip Harper, and at the age of 18, joined the Harper Brothers with Winard Harper. In 1988, he joined Betty Carter’s band. Starting in the early 1990s, he played with Cecil Brooks III, Abbey Lincoln, Diana Ross, Jimmy Scott, the Carnegie Hall Jazz Band, the Dizzy Gillespie All-Star Band, Kate Higgins, Sam Newsome, and especially Roy Hargrove, both in his big band and quintet. His debut recording project, Justin Time (Verve, 1991), was produced by Bobby Watson and featured Eddie Henderson, Kenny Barron, and Gary Bartz, among others. On 1998's Challenge, he was accompanied by his childhood friend Stephen Scott. Robinson lives in New Jersey.

In 1995, Robinson performed at the Charlie Parker Jazz Festival, a free concert at Tompkins Square Park.

== Discography ==
=== As leader ===
- 1991: Justin Time (Verve) – with Bobby Watson, Gary Bartz, Eddie Henderson, Kenny Barron, Stephen Scott, Peter Washington, and Lewis Nash
- 1998: The Challenge (Arabesque) – with Ron Blake, Stephen Scott, Dwayne Burno, and Dion Parsons
- 2012: In the Spur of the Moment (WJ3)
- 2014: Alana's Fantasy (Criss Cross Jazz)
- 2019: At First Light (WJ3)

=== As member/sideman ===
With Roy Hargrove

- 2006: Nothing Serious (Verve)
- 2008: Earfood (EmArcy)
- 2009: The Roy Hargrove Big Band, Emergence (EmArcy)

With others

- 1990: The Harper Brothers (Philip and Winard), Remembrance: Live at the Village Vanguard (Verve)
- 1990: Cecil Brooks III, Hangin' with Smooth (Muse)
- 1997: Abbey Lincoln, Who Used to Dance (Verve)
