= Warming Up =

Warming Up may refer to:

- Warming Up (1928 film), American film
- Warming Up (1985 film), Australian film
- Warming Up, an internet blog by British comedian Richard Herring
- Warming Up!, an album by Billy Taylor
