= The Lion and His Pride =

Studio album by Houston Person
- Released: 1994
- Recorded: September 13, 1991
- Studio: Sear Sound, New York City
- Genre: Jazz
- Length: 60:32
- Label: Muse; MCD 5480
- Producer: Houston Person

Houston Person chronology
Why Not! (1991)	The Lion and His Pride (1994)	Christmas with Houston Person and Friends (1994)

The Lion and His Pride is an album by saxophonist Houston Person that was released by Muse in 1994.

Professional ratings
Review scores
Source	Rating
AllMusic	4/5 stars

== Track listing ==
1. "Dig" (Miles Davis) – 9:32
2. "I Remember Clifford" (Benny Golson) – 7:33
3. "Dear Heart" (Henry Mancini, Ray Evans, Jay Livingston) – 8:06
4. "Sweet Love (Theme from Black Orpheus)" (Luiz Bonfá, Antônio Maria) – 6:26
5. "You Are Too Beautiful" (Richard Rodgers, Lorenz Hart) – 6:52
6. "Like Someone in Love" (Jimmy Van Heusen, Johnny Burke) – 7:11
7. "Our Day Will Come" (Mort Garson, Bob Hilliard) – 4:46
8. "Captain Hook" (Benny Green) – 10:06

== Personnel ==
- Houston Person – tenor saxophone
- Philip Harper – trumpet
- Benny Green – piano
- Christian McBride – bass
- Winard Harper – drums
- Sammy Figueroa – percussion (tracks 2–8)
- Etta Jones – vocals
