= Impromptu (Billy Taylor album) =

Studio album by Billy Taylor
- Released: 1962
- Recorded: May 8, 9 & 10, 1962; Nola Penthouse Studios, New York City
- Genre: Jazz
- Length: 42:13
- Label: Mercury; MG 20722

Billy Taylor chronology
Kwamina (1961)	Impromptu (1962)	Right Here, Right Now (1963)

Impromptu is an album by American jazz pianist Billy Taylor which was recorded in 1962 and released on the Mercury label.

== Reception ==
Professional ratings
Review scores
Source	Rating
Allmusic	4/5 stars

Allmusic awarded the album 4 stars stating "Several of these songs have remained in his repertoire and have been recorded again in the decades that followed".

== Track listing ==
All compositions by Billy Taylor

1. "Capricious" - 2:20
2. "Impromptu" - 9:35
3. "Don't Go Down South" - 3:47
4. "Muffle Guffle" - 4:48
5. "Free and Oozy" - 6:27
6. "Paraphrase" - 4:48
7. "Empty Ballroom (Une Salle de Bal Vide)" - 4:20
8. "At la Carousel" - 6:08

== Personnel ==
- Billy Taylor - piano
- Jim Hall - guitar
- Bob Cranshaw - bass
- Walter Perkins - drums
