= Statesmen of Jazz =

Statesmen of Jazz was a swing jazz group started in 1994 by the American Federation of Jazz Societies.

The group performs as a sextet, but it has a rotating, all-star membership comprising about thirty musicians. The group released its first album in 1994 for Arbors Records, performed at the Sacramento Jazz Jubilee in 1995, and toured Japan in 1997.

When the group started, all of its members were over the age of 65.

== Members ==
- Louie Bellson
- Bill Berry (trumpeter)
- Keter Betts
- Bob Cranshaw
- Kenny Davern
- Buddy DeFranco
- Panama Francis
- Johnny Frigo
- Wycliffe Gordon
- Al Grey
- Milt Hinton
- Red Holloway
- Jane Jarvis
- Jay Leonhart
- Eddie Locke
- Dennis Mackrel
- George Masso
- Earl May
- Ken Peplowski
- Houston Person
- Bucky Pizzarelli
- Ed Polcer
- Benny Powell
- Don Sickler
- Norman Simmons
- Carrie Smith
- Derek Smith
- Irvin Stokes
- Buddy Tate
- Clark Terry
- Warren Vache
- Johnny Varro
- Frank Wess
- Benny Waters
- Joe Wilder
- Spiegle Willcox
- Claude Williams

== Discography ==
- Statesmen of Jazz (Arbors, 1994)
- A Multitude of Stars (Arbors, 2004)
