= Hangin' with Smooth =

Studio album by Cecil Brooks III
- Released: 1992
- Recorded: December 14, 1990
- Studios: Van Gelder, Englewood Cliffs, NJ
- Genre: Jazz
- Length: 53:11
- Labels: Muse; MCD 5428
- Producer: Cecil Brooks III

Cecil Brooks III chronology
The Collective (1989)	Hangin' with Smooth (1992)	Neck Peckin' Jammie (1993)

Hangin' with Smooth is an album by drummer Cecil Brooks III, recorded in 1990 and released on the Muse label.

== Reception ==
Professional ratings
Review scores
Source	Rating
AllMusic	4/5 stars

The Star-Ledger praised the "mix of hard-bopped standards, smooth ballads and smart, catchy originals." The Boston Herald listed Hangin' with Smooth among the 10 best jazz albums of 1992.

The AllMusic review by Scott Yanow stated that "this is an excellent modern mainstream set by some of the finest young lions of the 1990s."

== Track listing ==
All compositions by Cecil Brooks III except where noted.

1. "Hangin' with Smooth" – 5:13
2. "I've Grown Accustomed to Her Face" (Frederick Loewe, Alan Jay Lerner) – 7:39
3. "Swamp Thang" – 8:36
4. "Adreena" – 5:14
5. "Don't Forget the Forgotten" (Radam Schwartz) – 7:39
6. "Midnight Sun" (Lionel Hampton, Sonny Burke, Johnny Mercer) – 4:05
7. "I'm a Fool to Want You" (Joel Herron, Jack Wolf, Frank Sinatra) – 3:11
8. "Autumn in New York" (Vernon Duke) – 2:36
9. "Invisible Face" (Schwartz) – 6:57
10. "Healing Rhythms for Adriane" – 2:01

== Personnel ==
- Cecil Brooks III – drums
- Phillip Harper – trumpet
- Justin Robinson – alto saxophone
- Craig Handy – tenor saxophone
- Benny Green – piano
- Peter Washington – bass
- Kenneth Davis – electric bass (track 4)
