= Just Friends (Buddy Tate, Nat Simkins and Houston Person album) =

Studio album by Buddy Tate, Nat Simkins and Houston Person
- Released: 1992
- Recorded: February 15, 1990
- Studio: Van Gelder Studio, Englewood Cliffs, NJ
- Genre: Jazz
- Length: 46:51
- Label: Muse; MCD 5418
- Producer: Houston Person

Houston Person chronology
Now's the Time (1990)	Just Friends (1992)	Why Not! (1991)

Buddy Tate chronology
Just Jazz (1984)	Just Friends (1992)

Just Friends, subtitled The Tenors of Buddy Tate, Nat Simkins, Houston Person, is an album by saxophonists Buddy Tate, Nat Simkins and Houston Person that was released by Muse in 1992.

Professional ratings
Review scores
Source	Rating
AllMusic	3/5 stars

== Track listing ==
1. "Broadway" (Billy Bird, Teddy McRae, Henri Woode) – 6:39
2. "Ellington Medley: Day Dream/In a Sentimental Mood/Sophisticated Lady" (Duke Ellington, Billy Strayhorn/Ellington, Manny Kurtz, Irving Mills/Ellington, Mitchell Parish, Mills) – 7:38
3. "Lucaya Blue" (Nat Simkins) – 5:03
4. "Ain't Misbehavin'" (Fats Waller, Harry Brooks, Andy Razaf) – 5:58
5. "Buddy's Blues" (Buddy Tate) – 7:50
6. "Just Friends" (John Klenner, Sam M. Lewis) – 6:48
7. "Polka Dots and Moonbeams" (Jimmy Van Heusen, Johnny Burke) – 6:55

== Personnel ==
- Buddy Tate, Nat Simkins, Houston Person – tenor saxophone
- Stan Hope – piano
- Major Holley – bass
- Grady Tate – drums
