= Taylor Made Jazz =

Studio album by Billy Taylor
- Released: 1959
- Recorded: November 17, 1957
- Studio: Chicago
- Genre: Jazz
- Label: Argo
- Producer: Dave Usher

Billy Taylor chronology
Billy Taylor with Four Flutes (1958)	Taylor Made Jazz (1959)	Uptown (1960)

Taylor Made Jazz is an album by American jazz pianist Billy Taylor. It was recorded in Chicago on November 17, 1957 and released by the Argo label. The album includes members of Duke Ellington's orchestra performing arrangements by Johnny Pate.

== Reception ==
Professional ratings
Review scores
Source	Rating
Allmusic	3/5 stars

Allmusic awarded the album 3 stars stating: "though this isn't one of those small Ellingtonian unit sessions, it's just about the next best thing. Having assembled several members of Duke's band and written eight definitely Duke-influenced tunes, pianist/composer Billy Taylor's Taylor Made Jazz would probably have been marketed as a 'tribute album' if it had been released recently".

== Track listing ==
All compositions by Billy Taylor

1. "Biddy's Beat"
2. "Theodora"
3. "Mood for Mendes"
4. "Daddy-O"
5. "Cu-Blu"
6. "Day Dreaming"
7. "Can You Tell by Looking at Me"
8. "Tune Up!"

== Personnel ==
- Billy Taylor – piano
- Willie Cook – trumpet
- Clark Terry – trumpet
- Britt Woodman – trombone
- Johnny Hodges – alto saxophone
- Paul Gonsalves – tenor saxophone
- Harry Carney – baritone saxophone
- Earl May – double bass
- Ed Thigpen – drums
