= The Collective (Cecil Brooks III album) =

Studio album by Cecil Brooks III
- Released: 1989
- Recorded: March 27, 1989
- Studio: The Warehouse Recording Studio, NYC
- Genre: Jazz
- Length: 49:06
- Label: Muse; MR 5377
- Producer: Houston Person

Cecil Brooks III chronology
The Collective (1989)	Hangin' with Smooth (1990)

The Collective is an album by drummer Cecil Brooks III which was recorded in 1989 and released on the Muse label.

== Reception ==
Professional ratings
Review scores
Source	Rating
AllMusic	4/5 stars

The AllMusic review by Scott Yanow stated "the two saxophonists have their own sounds and the logic in their improvisations is both unpredictable and highly original. The versatile pianist Geri Allen fits in well with her contemporaries and both bassist Lonnie Plaxico and Brooks (who contributed two originals) are strong in support of the soloists".

== Track listing ==
All compositions by Cecil Brooks III except where noted.

1. "The Sketch Is the Key" (Greg Osby) – 6:01
2. "We'll Be Together Again" (Carl T. Fischer, Frankie Laine) – 5:55
3. "Ace Boy (Little Cece)" – 6:29
4. "Sunshine" – 5:28
5. "Are You Real" (Benny Golson) – 3:55
6. "West Coast Blues" (Wes Montgomery) – 5:30
7. "Temptation" (Nacio Herb Brown, Arthur Freed) – 3:50
8. "We'll Be Together Again" (Long Version) (Fisher, Laine) – 11:58 Additional track on CD release

== Personnel ==
- Cecil Brooks III – drums
- Greg Osby – alto saxophone, soprano saxophone
- Gary Thomas – tenor saxophone
- Geri Allen – piano
- Lonnie Plaxico – bass
