= Billy Taylor =

American jazz pianist, composer, and educator (1921–2010)

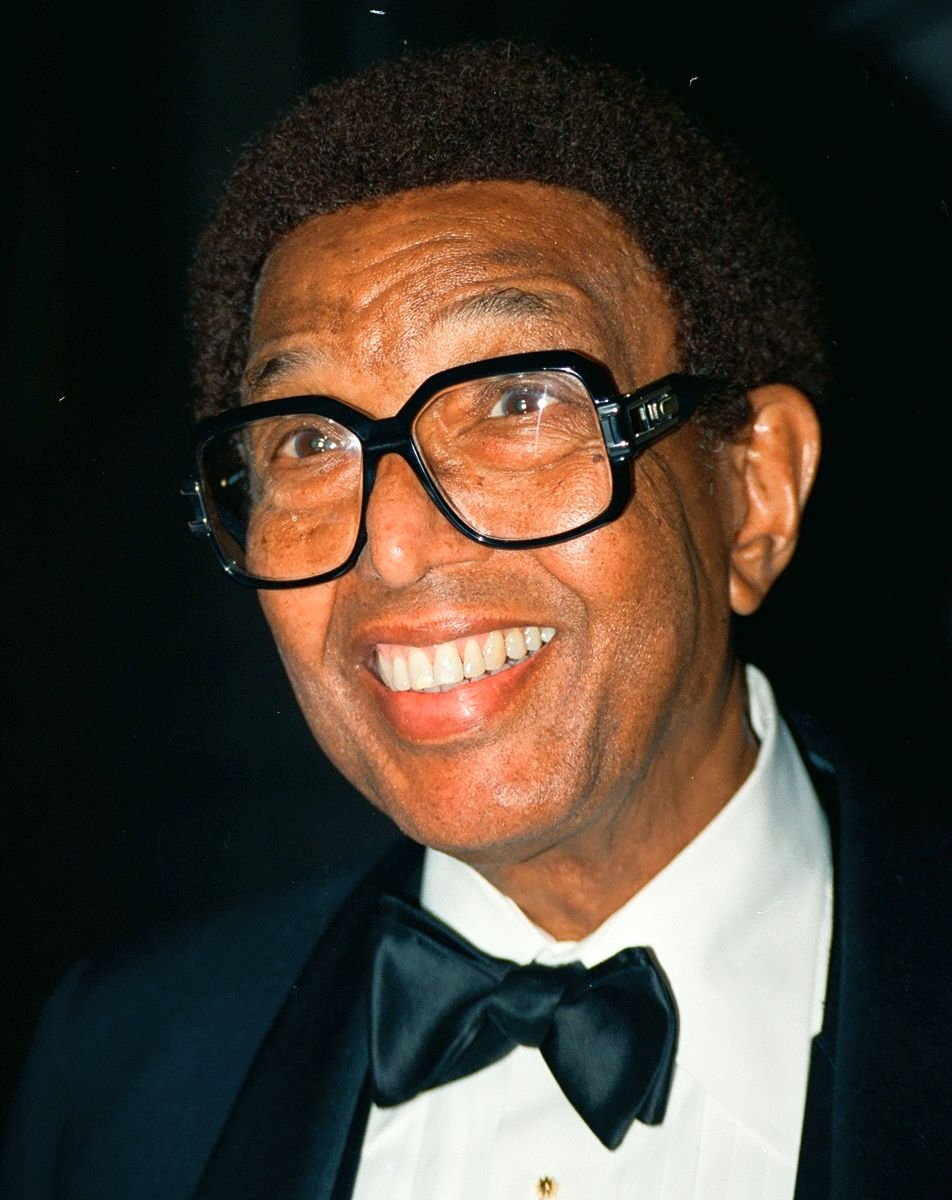
- Taylor in 2000

Background information
- Born: William Edward Taylor Jr. July 24, 1921; Greenville, North Carolina, U.S.
- Died: December 28, 2010 (aged 89) New York City, U.S.
- Education: Virginia State College
- Genres: Jazz, bebop, hard bop
- Occupations: Musician, composer, educator, broadcaster
- Instrument: Piano
- Years active: 1944–2010

Billy Taylor (July 24, 1921 – December 28, 2010) was an American jazz pianist, composer, broadcaster and educator. He was the Robert L. Jones Distinguished Professor of Music at East Carolina University in Greenville, and from 1994 was the artistic director for jazz at the John F. Kennedy Center for the Performing Arts in Washington, D.C.

A jazz activist, Taylor sat on the Honorary Founders Board of The Jazz Foundation of America, an organisation he founded in 1989, with Ann Ruckert, Herb Storfer and Phoebe Jacobs, to save the homes and the lives of America's elderly jazz and blues musicians, later including musicians who survived Hurricane Katrina.

Taylor was a jazz educator, who lectured in colleges, served on panels and travelled worldwide as a jazz ambassador. Critic Leonard Feather once said, "It is almost indisputable that Dr. Billy Taylor is the world's foremost spokesman for jazz."

== Biography ==
=== Early life and career ===
Taylor was born in Greenville, North Carolina, United States, but moved to Washington, D.C., when he was five years old. He grew up in a musical family and learned to play different instruments as a child, including guitar, drums and saxophone. He was most successful at the piano, and had classical piano lessons with Henry Grant, who had educated Duke Ellington a generation earlier. Taylor made his first professional appearance playing keyboard at the age of 13 and was paid one dollar.

Taylor attended Dunbar High School, the U.S.'s first high school for African-American students. He attended Virginia State College and majored in sociology. During his time, he joined Kappa Alpha Psi fraternity. Pianist Undine Smith Moore noticed young Taylor's talent in piano and he changed his major to music, graduating with a degree in music in 1942.

Taylor moved to New York City after graduation and started playing piano professionally from 1944, first with Ben Webster's Quartet on New York's 52nd Street. The same night he joined Webster's Quartet, he met Art Tatum, who became his mentor. Among the other musicians Taylor worked with was Machito and his mambo band, from whom he developed a love for Latin music. After an eight-month tour with the Don Redman Orchestra in Europe, Taylor stayed there with his wife, Theodora, and in Paris and the Netherlands.

Taylor returned to New York later that year and cooperated with Bob Wyatt and Sylvia Syms at the Royal Roost jazz club and Billie Holiday in a successful show called Holiday on Broadway. A year later, he became the house pianist at Birdland and performed with Charlie Parker, J.J. Johnson, Stan Getz, Dizzy Gillespie and Miles Davis. Taylor played at Birdland longer than any other pianist in the club's history. In 1949, Taylor published his first book, a textbook about bebop piano styles.

=== Mid-career ===
In 1952, Taylor composed one of his best known tunes, "I Wish I Knew How It Would Feel to Be Free", which achieved more popularity with the civil rights movement of the 1950s and 1960s. Nina Simone recorded the song on her 1967 album Silk & Soul. The tune is known in the UK as a piano instrumental version, used for BBC Television's long-running Film... programme. He made dozens of recordings in the 1950s and 1960s, including Billy Taylor Trio with Candido with Cuban percussionist Candido Camero, My Fair Lady Loves Jazz, Cross Section and Taylor Made Jazz.

In 1958, he became music director of NBC's The Subject Is Jazz, the first television series focusing on jazz. The 13-part series was produced by the new National Educational Television Network with guests such as Duke Ellington, Aaron Copland, Bill Evans, Cannonball Adderley, Jimmy Rushing, and Langston Hughes. Taylor also worked as a DJ and programme director on radio station WLIB in New York in the 1960s. During the 1960s, the Billy Taylor Trio was a regular feature of the Hickory House on West 55th Street in Manhattan. From 1969 to 1972, he served as music director for The David Frost Show and was the first African American to lead a talk-show band. Louis Armstrong, Count Basie, Benny Goodman, and Buddy Rich were just a few of the musicians who played on the show.

In 1964, he established Jazzmobile in New York City as a way to promote jazz through educational programmes. In 1981, Jazzmobile produced a jazz special for National Public Radio, for which the programme received the Peabody Award for Excellence in Broadcasting Programs. Jazzmobile's 1990 Tribute Concert to Taylor at Avery Fisher Hall, part of the JVC Jazz Festival, featured Nancy Wilson, Ahmad Jamal Trio, and Terence Blanchard Quintet.

Taylor hosted two long-running jazz programs on National Public Radio. Jazz Alive! ran from 1977 to 1983, and Billy Taylor's Jazz at the Kennedy Center ran from 1995 to 2001. The former program won the Peabody Award.

=== Later career ===
In 1981, after being profiled by CBS News Sunday Morning, Taylor was hired as an on-air correspondent and then conducted more than 250 interviews with musicians. He received an Emmy Award for his segment on the multi-talented Quincy Jones.

In 1989, Taylor formed his own "Taylor Made" record label to document his own music. You Tempt Me (1996), by his 1985 trio (with Victor Gaskin and drummer Curtis Boyd), includes a rendition of Ellington's/Strayhorn's "Take the "A" Train". White Nights (1991) has Taylor, Gaskin, and drummer Bobby Thomas performing live from Leningrad in the Soviet Union. Then came Solo (1992), and Jazzmobile Allstars (1992). In 1997, he received the New York State Governor's Art Award.

Taylor suffered from a 2002 stroke, which affected his right hand, but he continued to perform almost until his death. He died after a heart attack on December 28, 2010, in Manhattan at the age of 89.

His legacy was honored in a Harlem memorial service on January 11, 2011, featuring performances by Taylor's final working trio – bassist Chip Jackson and drummer Winard Harper – along with long-time Taylor associates Jimmy Owens, Frank Wess, Geri Allen, Christian Sands and vocalist Cassandra Wilson. Taylor was survived by his wife of 65 years, Theodora Castion Taylor; a daughter, Kim Taylor-Thompson; and a granddaughter. His son, artist Duane Taylor, died in 1988.

== Legacy ==
Taylor appeared on hundreds of albums and composed more than 300 songs during his career, which spanned more than six decades. His 1963 song "I Wish I Knew How It Would Feel to Be Free" dealt with civil rights issues and became the unofficial anthem of the civil rights movement in the 1960s. It was selected as "one of the greatest songs of the sixties" by The New York Times and was the theme music of the BBC Film TV programme and the 1996 film Ghosts of Mississippi.

Engaging and educating more audience and young people was a central part of Taylor's career. He was the Wilbur D. Barrett Chair of Music at the University of Massachusetts Amherst and a Duke Ellington Fellow at Yale. Besides publishing instructional books on jazz, he taught jazz courses at Howard University, Long Island University, the Manhattan School of Music, and the University of Massachusetts Amherst, where he had studied under Roland Wiggins and earned his master's degree and EdD degree in Music Education in 1975.

His extensive appearance in television series and jazz educational programs brought the music he loved to the masses at the grassroots level as well as more formal arenas. He was sometimes better known as a television personality than a pianist. He was quoted in a 2007 article in the Post Magazine: "There's no question that being an advocate eclipsed my reputation as a musician. It was my doing. I wanted to prove to people that jazz has an audience. I had to do that for me."

== Awards and honors ==
Taylor had more than 20 honorary doctoral degrees and was the recipient of two Peabody Awards for Jazzmobile, NEA Jazz Masters Award (1998), an Emmy Award (1983) for carrying out more than 250 interviews for CBS News Sunday Morning, a Grammy Award (2004) Down Beat magazine's Lifetime Achievement award (1984), National Medal of Arts (1992), and the Tiffany Award (1991). In 1981, he received an Honorary Doctorate of Music from the Berklee College of Music.

He was honored in 2001 with the American Society of Composers, Authors and Publishers (ASCAP) Jazz Living Legend Award, and election to the Hall of Fame for the International Association for Jazz Education. He served as artistic director for jazz at the Kennedy Center for the Performing Arts, where he developed many critically acclaimed concert series, including the Louis Armstrong Legacy series, and the annual Mary Lou Williams Women in Jazz Festival. In addition, he performed at the White House seven times and was one of only three jazz musicians to be appointed to the National Council of the Arts.

Taylor was inducted into the North Carolina Music Hall of Fame in 2010.

== Discography ==
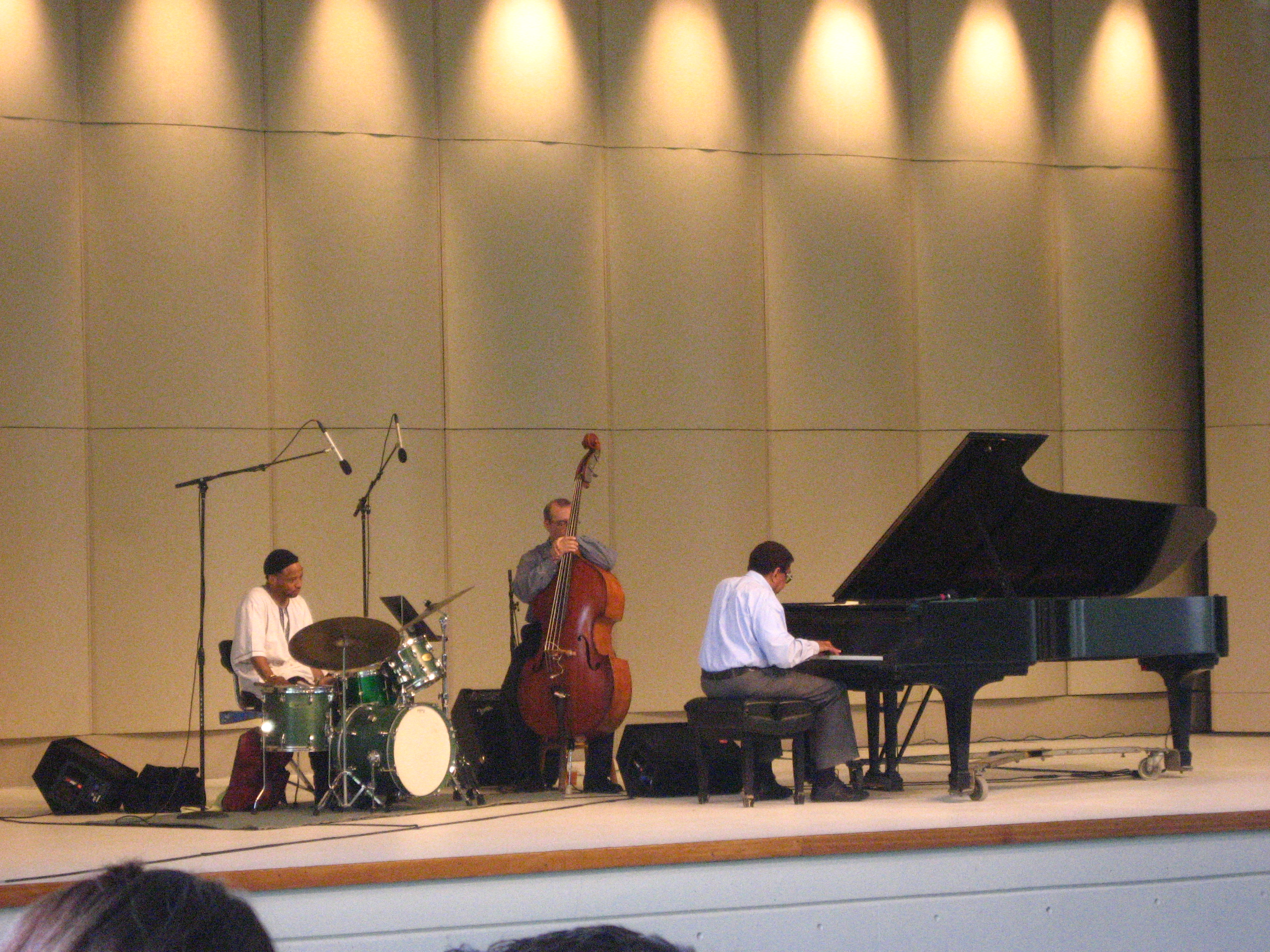
Taylor performing at Usdan Center for the Creative and Performing Arts, Long Island, New York, June 25, 2007

=== As leader ===
- 1945: Billy Taylor Piano (Savoy)
- 1951: Piano Panorama (Atlantic and 1957 as most of The Billy Taylor Touch)
- 1952: Jazz At Storyville (Roost 1952)
- 1953: Billy Taylor Trio (Prestige)
- 1953–54: Cross Section (Prestige) – released 1956 (includes all tracks from Billy Taylor Plays for DJs)
- 1954: The Billy Taylor Trio with Candido (Prestige)
- 1954: Billy Taylor Trio at Town Hall (Prestige) (Status 1965)
- 1955: A Touch of Taylor (Prestige)
- 1956: Evergreens (ABC-Paramount)
- 1956: Billy Taylor at the London House (ABC-Paramount)
- 1957: Introduces Ira Sullivan (ABC-Paramount)
- 1957: My Fair Lady Loves Jazz (ABC-Paramount; Impulse! 1965, ABC Impulse! 1968)
- 1957: The Billy Taylor Touch (Atlantic) - featuring tracks recorded in 1951 and 1957
- 1957: The New Billy Taylor Trio (ABC-Paramount)
- 1959: One for Fun (Atlantic)
- 1959: Billy Taylor with Four Flutes (Riverside; with Frank Wess, Herbie Mann and Jerome Richardson)
- 1959: Taylor Made Jazz (Argo)
- 1960: Uptown (Riverside)
- 1960: Warming Up! (Riverside) - also released as Custom Taylored (SeSac) and Easy Like (Surrey)
- 1961: Interlude (Prestige Moodsville)
- 1961: Kwamina (Mercury)
- 1962: Impromptu (Mercury)
- 1963: Right Here, Right Now! (Capitol)
- 1965: Midnight Piano (Capitol)
- 1968: I Wish I Knew How It Would Feel to Be Free (Tower)
- 1969: Sleeping Bee (MPS) - also released as Billy Taylor Today (Prestige)
- 1970: Ok Billy (Bell)
- 1977: Jazz Live (Monmouth Evergreen)
- 1977: Live at Storyville (1977 recording for West 54 Records)
- 1981: With Joe Kennedy Where've You Been (Concord Jazz)
- 1985: You Tempt Me (Taylor-Made, 1989)
- 1988: White Nights And Jazz in Leningrad (Taylor-Made)
- 1988: Solo (Taylor-Made)
- 1989: Billy Taylor and the Jazzmobile All Stars (Taylor-Made)
- 1991: White Nights and Jazz in Leningrad (Taylor-Made)
- 1992: Dr. T with Gerry Mulligan (GRP Records)
- 1993: Live at MCG with Gerry Mulligan, Carl Allen, Chip Jackson
- 1993: It's a Matter of Pride (GRP)
- 1995: Homage (GRP)
- 1997: The Music Keeps Us Young (Arkadia Jazz)
- 1999: Ten Fingers – One Voice (Arkadia Jazz)
- 1999: Taylor Made at the Kennedy Center with Dee Dee Bridgewater (Kennedy Center Jazz)
- 2001: Urban Griot (Soundspot)
- 2002: Live at AJE New York (Soundspot)

=== As sideman ===
With Arkadia Jazz All Stars

- Thank You, Duke!

With Johnny Hartman

- Once in Every Life (Bee Hive, 1980)

With Coleman Hawkins

- Timeless Jazz (Jazztone, 1954)

With Mundell Lowe

- A Grand Night for Swinging (Riverside, 1957)

With the Metronome All-Stars

- Metronome All-Stars 1956 (Clef, 1956)

With Sal Salvador

- Juicy Lucy (Bee Hive, 1978)

With Sonny Stitt

- The Matadors Meet the Bull (Roulette, 1965)
- What's New!!! (Roulette, 1966)

With Lucky Thompson

- Accent on Tenor Sax (Urania 1954)

With Various Artists

- Charlie Parker 10th Memorial Concert (Limelight Records, 1965)
- Jazz Tones with Coleman Hawkins, 1954; reissued 1984, Xanadu Records

== See also ==
- List of people from Harlem
