= Montecito Inn =

Hotel in Montecito, California, United States

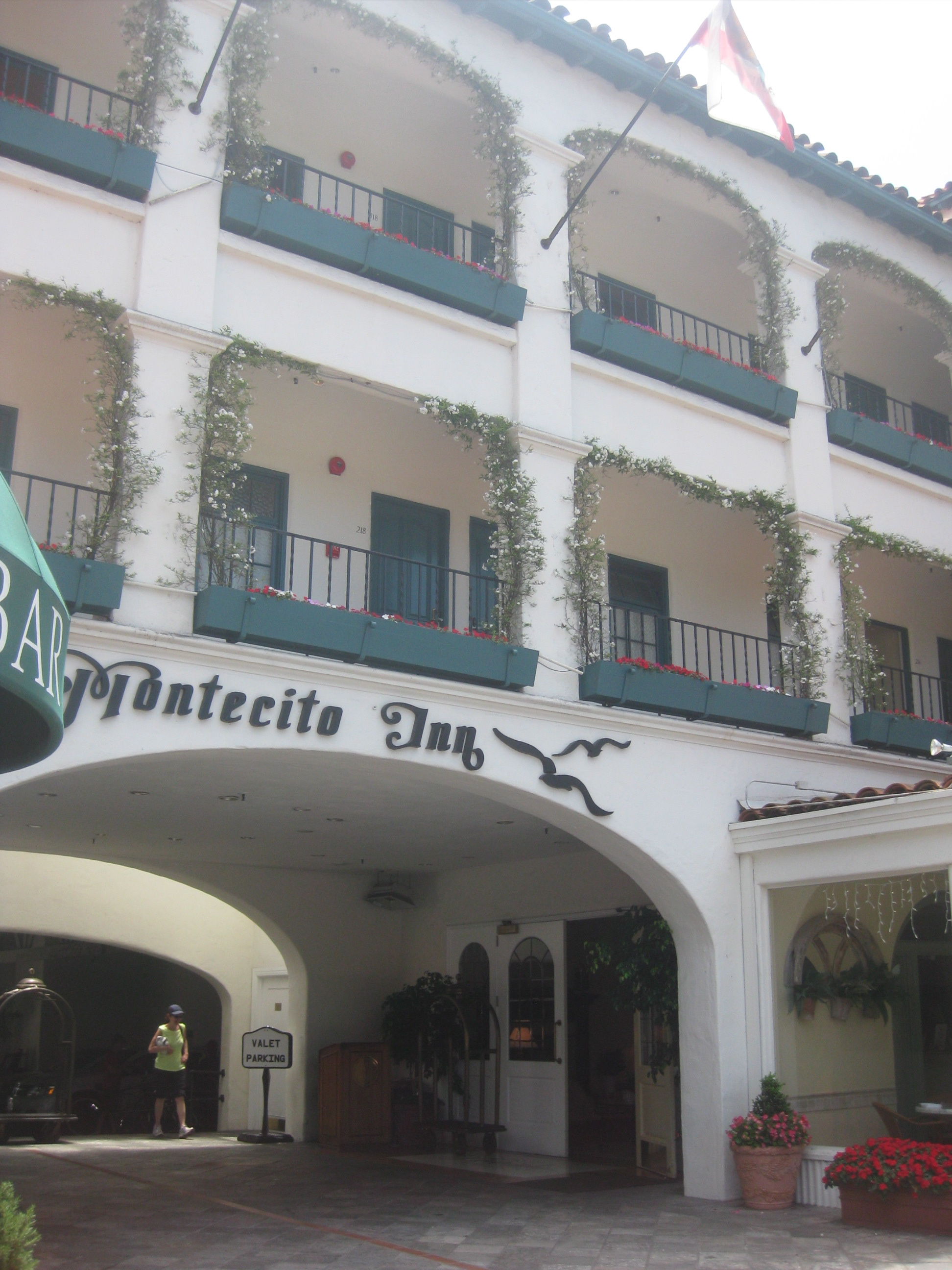

- Location in California

General information
- Location: Montecito, Santa Barbara County, California, USA
- Coordinates: 34°25′17″N 119°38′24″W
- Opening: 1928

Design and construction
- Developer: Charlie Chaplin

Other information
- Number of rooms: Around 60

The Montecito Inn is a boutique hotel in the southwestern part of Montecito, California. It is considered a Santa Barbara landmark. Located on Coast Village Road in Montecito, adjacent to U.S. Route 101, the inn is 2.5 blocks from Butterfly Beach. Pleistocene gravel deposits are evident nearby.

The hotel was built by Roscoe "Fatty" Arbuckle, Charlie Chaplin and friends in 1928 as an escape from show business. The inn has a complete library of Chaplin's films; his image is seen in etched glass doors and in the hallways which are lined with movie posters. The 1936 Rodgers and Hart song, "There's a Small Hotel", drew inspiration from the Montecito Inn.

== History ==
Construction began in 1927, and was completed the following year at a cost of US$300,000. Similar to a Hollywood premiere, the February opening gala included Wallace Beery, Marion Davies, Janet Gaynor, Carole Lombard, Gilbert Roland, and Norma Shearer. The inn was the inspiration for the 1936 Rodgers and Hart song, There's a Small Hotel. but the original wishing well that was inspiration for this song was destroyed in a 1950s renovation. The US$225,000 remodeling occurred subsequent to the property's purchase in 1956 by Avery Brundage. The renovation included adding a parking facility and gardens. Though he sold the inn in 1960, he repossessed it the following year before selling it again in 1970 for over US$400,000. In 2003, the hotel underwent another interior renovation characterized by a Mediterranean style.

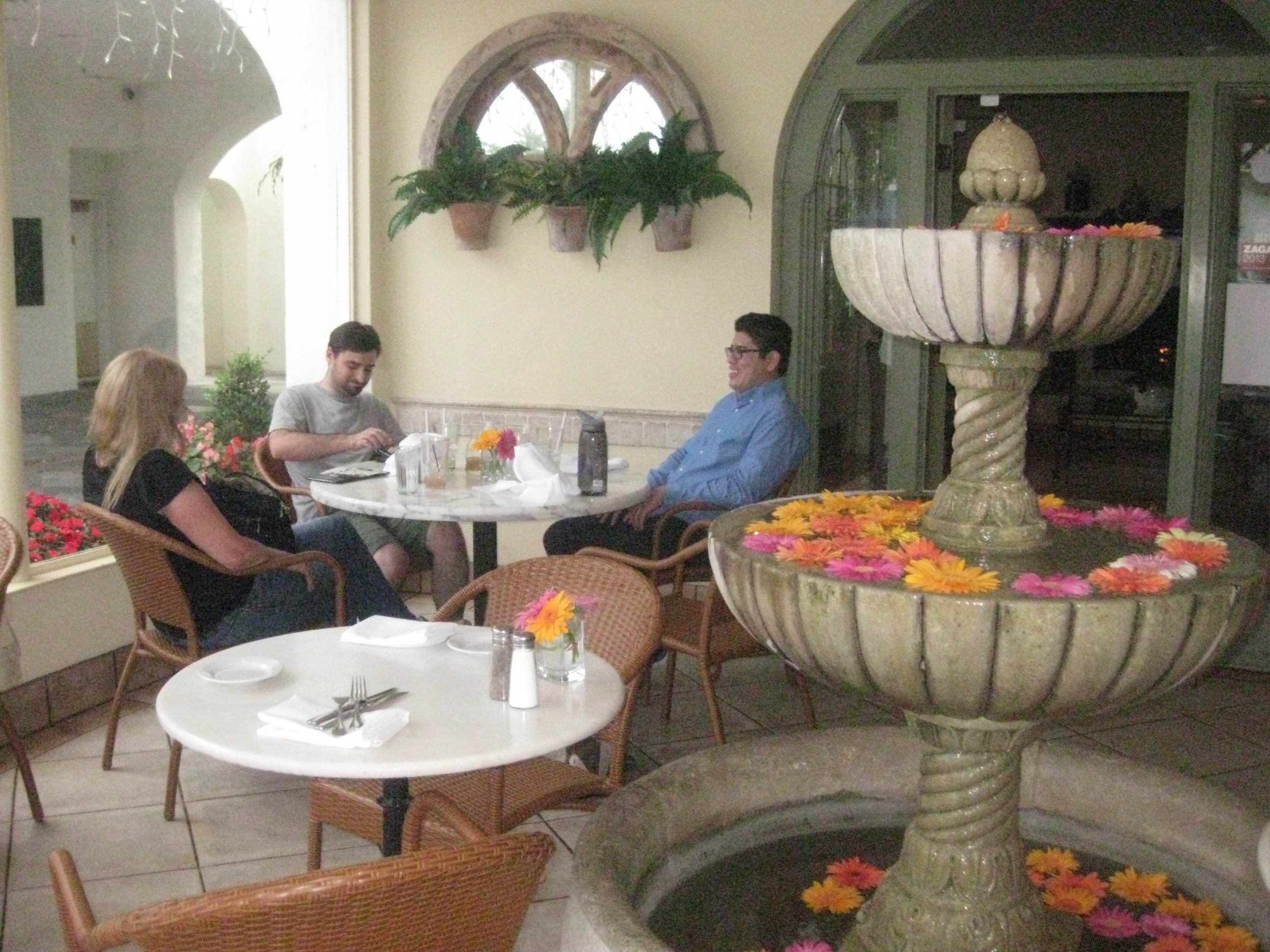

In 1938, the inn could accommodate 100 guests, with rates starting at US$2.50 for singles. In 1988, it reportedly had 53 rooms; there were 60 rooms in 2004.

The Inn was damaged by the 2018 Southern California mudflows.

== Architecture and fittings ==
The inn is a three-story Mediterranean-style hotel with a red tile roof, whitewashed walls and "overflowing flower boxes". Many of the rooms contain French provincial furnishings; bathrooms are of Italian marble, which is repeated in the lobby. Chaplin's favorite room was the Tower Suite which is popular today with honeymooners. Richard Rogers wrote of the hotel in 1936, "A small hotel, it's the kind of place where one of Chandler's dissolute heiresses might easily have hung her Lilly Daché hat." The hotel has a small fitness room, an outdoor swimming pool and spa, and wooden checkers tables in the hallway. Its Montecito Cafe, which serves California Nouveau cuisine, sits on the location of the original wishing well.

There are many images of Chaplin throughout the hotel. These include movie posters and glass etchings of Chaplin. The hotel has a Charlie Chaplin film library. With the 2003 renovation, photos of Santa Barbara were added.

== Gallery ==
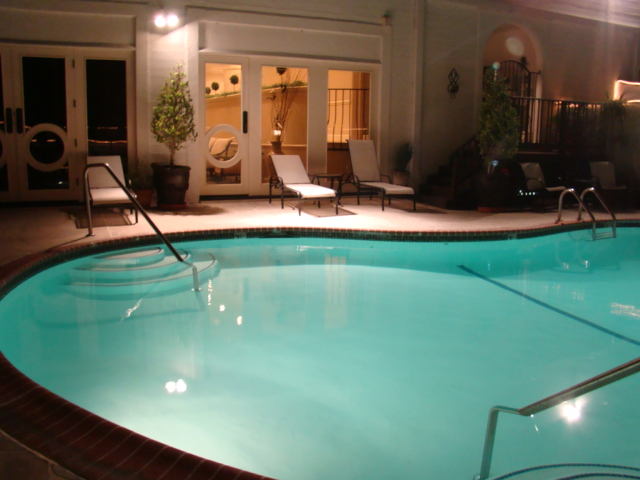
Swimming pool

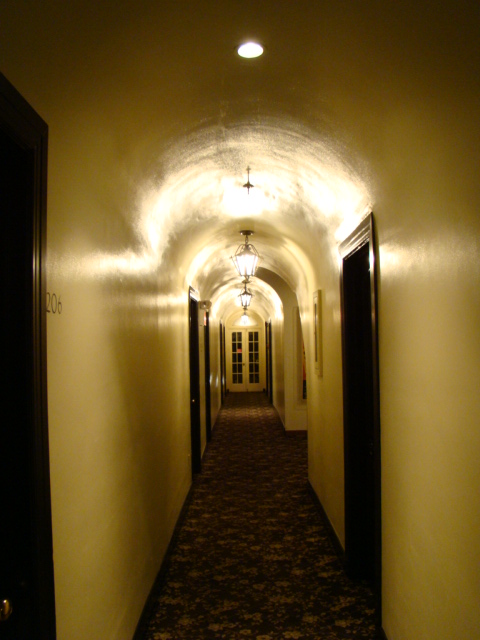
Corridor

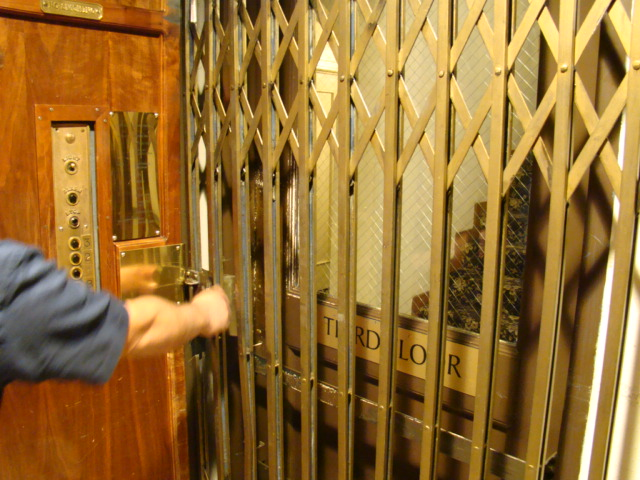
Old-fashioned elevator

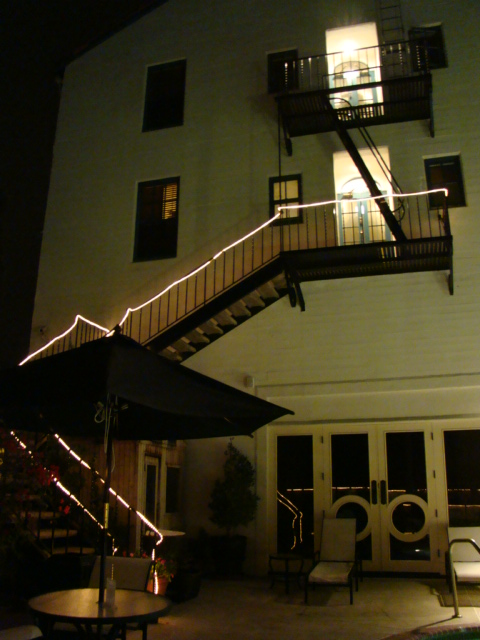
Fire escape

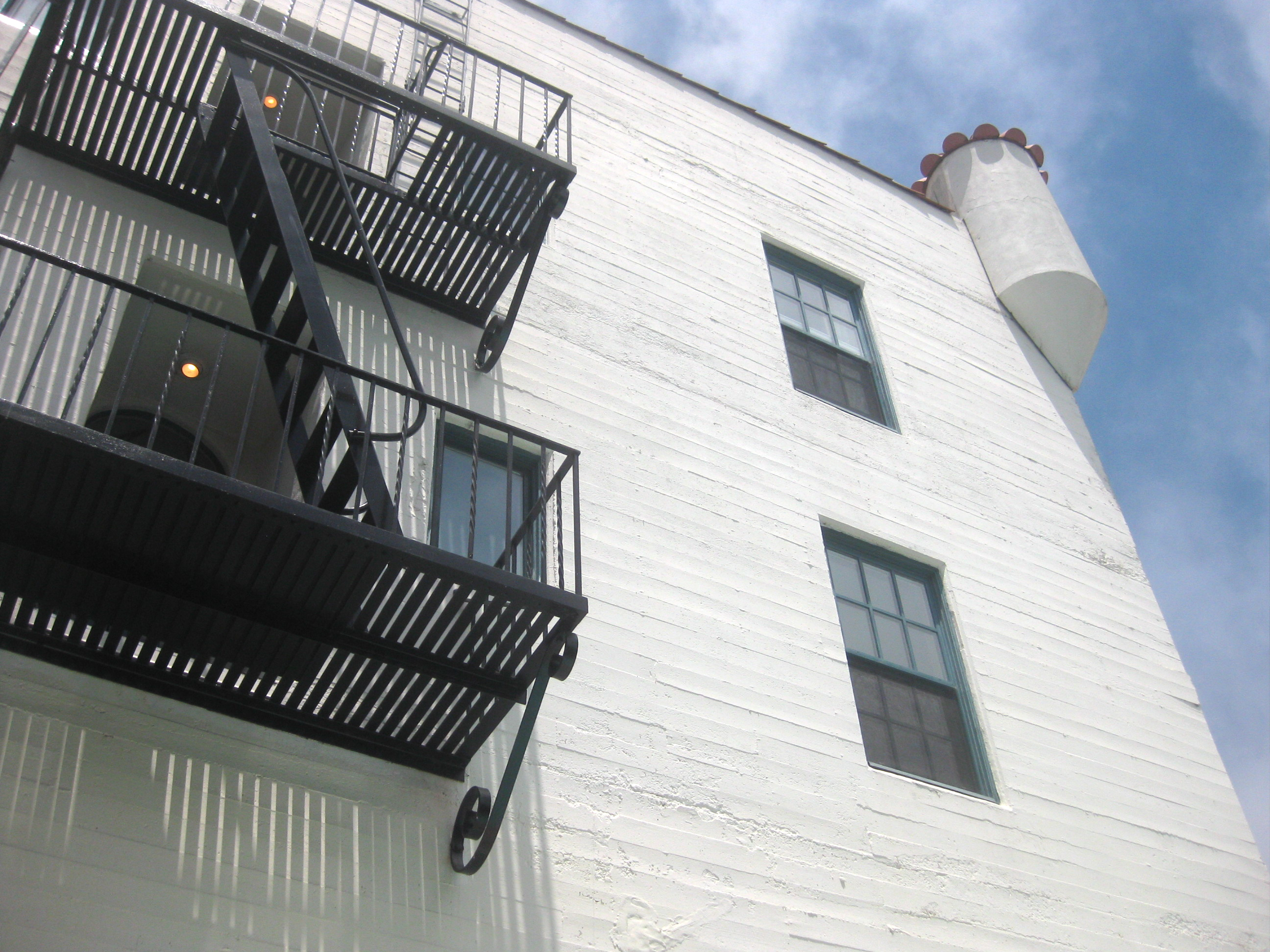
Hotel side view
