= Billy Taylor Trio =

Studio album by Billy Taylor
- Released: 1955
- Recorded: November 18, 1952, December 10, 1952, November 2, 1953 and December 29, 1953; New York City
- Genre: Jazz
- Label: Prestige; PRLP 7015 and PRLP 7016

Billy Taylor chronology
Jazz Live at Storyville (1952)	Billy Taylor Trio (1955)	Cross Section (1953-54)

Professional ratings
Review scores
Source	Rating
Allmusic	4/5 stars

Billy Taylor Trio is an album by American jazz pianist Billy Taylor composed of tracks recorded as singles in 1953 and 1954 for the Prestige label. The album was originally released as two volumes in 1955 and subsequently compiled as a CD in 1995.

== Track listing ==
All compositions by Billy Taylor except where noted.

1. "They Can't Take That Away from Me" (George Gershwin, Ira Gershwin) – 3:02
2. "All Too Soon" (Duke Ellington, Carl Sigman) – 2:50
3. "Accent on Youth" (Vee Lawnhurst, Tot Seymour) – 3:03
4. "Give Me the Simple Life" (Rube Bloom, Harry Ruby) – 2:52
5. "Little Girl Blue" (Lorenz Hart, Richard Rodgers) – 4:29
6. "Man With a Horn" (Eddie DeLange, Jack Jenney, Bonnie Lake) – 3:17
7. "Let's Get Away from It All" (Tom Adair, Matt Dennis) – 2:21
8. "Lover" (Hart, Rodgers) – 4:48
9. "Cool and Caressing" – 3:21
10. "Who Can I Turn To?" (Leslie Bricusse, Anthony Newley) – 3:22
11. "My One and Only Love" (Robert Mellin, Guy Wood) – 3:15
12. "Tenderly" (Walter Gross, Jack Lawrence) – 3:17
13. "I've Got the World on a String" (Harold Arlen, Ted Koehler) – 2:59
14. "Bird Watcher" – 2:56
15. "B.T.'s D.T.'s" – 5:01
16. "Hey Lock" (Eddie "Lockjaw" Davis) – 5:18
17. "That's All" (Alan Brandt, Bob Haymes) – 3:05
18. "The Little Things That Mean So Much" (Harold Adamson, Teddy Wilson) – 3:07
19. "Nice Work If You Can Get It" (Gershwin, Gershwin) – 3:08
20. "The Surrey with the Fringe on Top" (Oscar Hammerstein II, Rodgers) – 2:54

Note

- Recorded in New York City on November 18, 1952 (tracks 1–4), December 10, 1952 (tracks 5–8), November 2, 1953 (tracks 9–16) and December 29, 1953 (tracks 17–20). Tracks 1–8 & 16 originally released as Vol. 1 and tracks 9–15 & 17–20 originally released as Vol. 2.

== Personnel ==
- Billy Taylor – piano
- Earl May – bass
- Charlie Smith – drums
