= The Billy Taylor Trio with Candido =

Studio album by Billy Taylor
- Released: 1955
- Recorded: September 7, 1954
- Studio: Van Gelder Studio, Hackensack, NJ
- Genre: Jazz
- Length: 31:41
- Label: Prestige; PRLP 7051
- Producer: Bob Weinstock

Billy Taylor chronology
Cross Section (1953-54)	The Billy Taylor Trio with Candido (1955)	Billy Taylor Trio at Town Hall (1954)

The Bily Taylor Trio with Candido is an album by American jazz pianist Billy Taylor's trio with Cuban percussionist Candido Camero featuring tracks recorded in 1954 for the Prestige label.

== Reception ==
Professional ratings
Review scores
Source	Rating
Allmusic	4/5 stars
The Penguin Guide to Jazz Recordings	3/4 stars

Allmusic reviewer Stephen Cook stated: "A very nice program of Latin-tinged bop numbers".

== Track listing ==
All compositions by Billy Taylor, except where noted.

1. "Mambo Inn" (Mario Bauzá, Edgar Sampson, Bobby Woodlen) – 4:51
2. "Bit of Bedlam" – 5:14
3. "Declivity" – 4:41
4. "Love for Sale" (Cole Porter) – 7:46
5. "A Live One" – 2:50
6. "Different Bells" – 6:30

== Personnel ==
- Billy Taylor – piano
- Earl May – bass
- Charlie Smith – drums
- Candido Camero – congas
