= Interlude (Billy Taylor album) =

Studio album by Billy Taylor
- Released: 1961
- Recorded: January 3, 1961
- Studio: Van Gelder Studio, Englewood Cliffs, New Jersey
- Genre: Jazz
- Length: 42:44
- Label: Moodsville; MVLP 16

Billy Taylor chronology
Warming Up! (1960)	Interlude (1961)	Kwamina (1961)

Interlude is an album by American jazz pianist Billy Taylor featuring tracks recorded in 1961 and released on the Moodsville label.

== Reception ==
Professional ratings
Review scores
Source	Rating
Allmusic	3/5 stars

Allmusic awarded the album 3 stars.

== Track listing ==
All compositions by Billy Taylor except as indicated

1. "You Tempt Me" – 3:58
2. "Did You Dream Too" – 5:10
3. "You're All That Matters" – 4:28
4. "Interlude" – 4:24
5. "You're Mine, You" (Johnny Green, Edward Heyman) – 5:21
6. "My Heart Sings" – 4:59
7. "I Sigh" – 4:04
8. "Here Today Gone Tomorrow Love" – 4:24
9. "All Alone" – 4:39

== Personnel ==
- Billy Taylor – piano
- Doug Watkins – bass
- Ray Mosca – drums
