= The Hawk in Hi Fi =

Studio album by Coleman Hawkins with Billy Byers and His Orchestra
- Released: 1956
- Recorded: January 17, 18 and 20, 1956
- Studio: Webster Hall, New York City
- Genre: Jazz
- Length: 69:01 CD reissue with additional tracks
- Label: RCA Victor; LPM 1281
- Producer: Jack Lewis

Coleman Hawkins chronology
Accent on Tenor Sax (1955)	The Hawk in Hi Fi (1956)	The Hawk in Paris (1956)

The Hawk in Hi Fi is an album by saxophonist Coleman Hawkins with an orchestra arranged and conducted by Billy Byers. It was recorded in early 1956 and released on the RCA Victor label.

== Reception ==
Professional ratings
Review scores
Source	Rating
AllMusic	3/5 stars
The Penguin Guide to Jazz Recordings	3.5/4 stars

Scott Yanow of AllMusic states: "Hawkins is the main soloist throughout, and he was still very much in his prime 33 years after he first joined Fletcher Henderson's orchestra; in fact, the upcoming year of 1957 would be one of his finest. However, Byers' arrangements are more functional than inspired, and some of these selections are more easy listening than they are swinging".

On PopMatters, Matt Cibula noted "Every song here is pretty amazing. Byers’ arrangements are like simple rings on which Hawkins’ solos are beautiful diamonds. It might get a little soupy at times but there is nothing sentimental about any of these tracks, and there is real wit and verve and intelligence behind every choice here. And when they swing, they swing it hard. 'I Never Knew' rocks along very nicely, as do a couple more Hawkins originals; 'His Very Own Blues' and a new version of 'Bean and the Boys' entitled '39"-25"-39"' must have set many a late-‘50s dancefloor on fire. The alternate takes are not revelatory—they sound a whole lot like the finished versions, with the solos maybe not quite as sharp".

== Track listing ==
All compositions by Coleman Hawkins except where noted

1. "Body and Soul" (Johnny Green, Frank Eyton, Edward Heyman, Robert Sour) – 5:00
2. "Little Girl Blue" [Take 3] (Richard Rodgers, Lorenz Hart) – 3:04
3. "I Never Knew" [Take 5] (Raymond B. Egan, Roy Marsh, Tom Pitts) – 3:07
4. "Dinner for One Please, James" [Take 3] (Michael Carr) – 3:12
5. "The Bean Stalks Again" – 3:25
6. "His Very Own Blues" – 3:03
7. "The Day You Came Along" (Arthur Johnston, Sam Coslow) – 4:10
8. "Have You Met Miss Jones?" [Take 7] (Rodgers, Hart) – 3:06
9. "The Essence of You" – 3:30
10. "There Will Never Be Another You" (Harry Warren, Mack Gordon) – 3:00
11. "I'm Shooting High" (Jimmy McHugh, Ted Koehler) – 2:36
12. "39-25-39" [AKA "Bean and the Boys"] – 2:52
13. "There Will Never Be Another You" [Alternate Take I] (Warren, Gordon) – 3:23 Additional track on CD release
14. "There Will Never Be Another You" [Alternate Take II] (Warren, Gordon) – 3:26 Additional track on CD release
15. "Little Girl Blue" [Take 1] (Rodgers, Hart) – 3:09 Additional track on CD release
16. "Dinner for One Please, James" [Take 2] (Rodgers, Hart) – 3:17 Additional track on CD release
17. "I Never Knew" [Take 2] (Egan, Marsh, Pitts) – 3:18 Additional track on CD release
18. "Have You Met Miss Jones?" [Take 1] (Rodgers, Hart) – 3:10 Additional track on CD release
19. "Have You Met Miss Jones?" [Alternate Take I] (Rodgers, Hart) – 3:20 Additional track on CD release
20. "Have You Met Miss Jones?" [Alternate Take II] (Rodgers, Hart) – 2:38 Additional track on CD release
21. "The Day You Came Along" [Alternate Take] (Johnston, Coslow) – 3:15 Additional track on CD release

== Personnel ==
- Coleman Hawkins – tenor saxophone
- Billy Byers – arranged and conducted
- Bernie Glow (tracks 5–6 & 11–12), Jimmy Nottingham (tracks 2–4, 10 & 13–17), Lou Oles (tracks 5–6 & 11–12), Ernie Royal (tracks 5–6 & 11–12), Charlie Shavers (tracks 5–6 & 11–12), Nick Travis (tracks 5–6 & 11–12) – trumpet
- Urbie Green (tracks 2–6 & 10–17), Tommy Mitchell (tracks: 2–4, 10 & 13–17), Fred Ohms (tracks 2–6 & 10–17), Jack Satterfield (tracks 2–6 & 10–17), Chauncey Welsch (tracks 5–6, 11 & 12) – trombone
- Jimmy Buffington – French horn (tracks 1, 7–9 & 18–21)
- Don Butterfield – tuba (tracks 2–4, 10 & 13–17)
- Julius Baker – flute (tracks 1–4, 7–10 & 13–21)
- Sid Jekowsky – clarinet, flute (tracks 1–4, 7–10 & 13–21)
- Phil Bodner – oboe (tracks 1–4, 7–10 & 13–21)
- Sam Marowitz (tracks 5–6 & 11–12), Hal McKusick (tracks 5–6 & 11–12) – alto saxophone
- Al Cohn (tracks 5–6 & 11–12), Zoot Sims (tracks 5–6 & 11–12) – tenor saxophone
- Sol Schlinger – baritone saxophone (tracks 5–6 & 11–12)
- Marty Wilson – vibraphone, xylophone, glockenspiel
- Hank Jones – piano, celesta
- Barry Galbraith – guitar (tracks 5–6 & 11–12)
- Milt Hinton (tracks 5–6 & 11–12), Jack Lesberg (tracks 1, 7–9 & 18–21) – bass
- Osie Johnson – drums
- Phil Kraus – bells (tracks 1, 7–9 & 18–21)
- Alvin Rudnitsky, Arnold Eidus, Dave Newman, Dave Sarser, Gene Orloff, Harry Lookofsky, Leo Kruczek, Max Cahn, Max Hollander, Paul Gershman, Stan Kraft, Cy Miroff, Tosha Samaroff – violin
- Bert Fisch (tracks 1, 7–9 & 18–21), Izzy Zir (tracks 2–4, 10 & 13–17) – viola
- Alan Schulman (tracks: 2–4, 10 & 13–17), Bernie Greenhouse (tracks 1, 7–9 & 18–21), Eduardo Sodero (tracks 1, 7–9 & 18–21), George Ricci (tracks 1, 7–9 & 18–21) – cello
