= The Billy Taylor Touch =

Studio album by Billy Taylor
- Released: 1958
- Recorded: February 20, 1951 and October 28, 1957; New York City
- Genre: Jazz
- Length: 38:13
- Label: Atlantic; 1277
- Producer: Herb Abramson, Nesuhi Ertegun

Billy Taylor chronology
My Fair Lady Loves Jazz (1957)	The Billy Taylor Touch (1958)	The New Billy Taylor Trio (1957)

Piano Panorama cover

The Billy Taylor Touch is an album by American jazz pianist Billy Taylor released in 1958 on the Atlantic label and featuring seven tracks recorded in 1951 that were originally released on a 10-inch LP as Atlantic's Piano Panorama series along with four more tracks recorded in 1957.

== Reception ==
Professional ratings
Review scores
Source	Rating
Allmusic	4.5/5 stars

Allmusic awarded the album 4½ stars.

== Track listing ==
All compositions by Billy Taylor except as indicated

1. "You Make Me Feel So Young" (Josef Myrow, Mack Gordon) - 2:58
2. "Earl May" - 4:50
3. "Can You Tell by Looking at Me" - 4:24
4. "I Get a Kick Out of You" (Cole Porter) - 4:14
5. "Wrap Your Troubles in Dreams" (Harry Barris, Ted Koehler, Billy Moll) - 2:46
6. "Willow Weep for Me" (Ann Ronell) - 3:31
7. "Good Groove" - 3:04
8. "What Is There to Say?" (Vernon Duke, Yip Harburg) - 3:03
9. "Thou Swell" (Richard Rodgers, Lorenz Hart) - 3:14
10. "The Very Thought of You" (Ray Noble) - 3:24
11. "Somebody Loves Me" (Buddy DeSylva, George Gershwin, Ballard MacDonald) - 2:45
- Recorded in New York City on February 20, 1951 (tracks 5–11) and October 28, 1957 (tracks 1–4)

== Personnel ==
- Billy Taylor - piano
- John Collins - guitar (tracks 5–11)
- Earl May (tracks 1–4), Al McKibbon (tracks 5–11) - bass
- Ed Thigpen (tracks 1–4), Shadow Wilson (tracks 5–11) - drums
