= My Fair Lady Loves Jazz =

Studio album by Billy Taylor with Quincy Jones
- Released: 1964
- Recorded: January 8 & 22, and February 5, 1957
- Genre: Jazz
- Length: 32:57
- Label: ABC-Paramount, Impulse!

Billy Taylor chronology
Cross Section (1956)	My Fair Lady Loves Jazz (1964)	The Billy Taylor Touch (1957)

Impulse! Reissue cover

My Fair Lady Loves Jazz is an album by American jazz pianist Billy Taylor featuring performances of show tunes from the musical My Fair Lady recorded in 1957 and originally released on the ABC-Paramount label and rereleased Impulse! label in 1964 following the release of the film.

== Reception ==
The Allmusic review by Scott Yanow awarded the album 4½ stars calling it "one of the very best jazz interpretations of the classic score... Highly recommended".

Professional ratings
Review scores
Source	Rating
Allmusic	4.5/5 stars

== Track listing ==
All compositions by Alan Jay Lerner and Frederick Loewe

1. "Show Me" - 4:46
2. "I've Grown Accustomed to Her Face" - 3:42
3. "With a Little Bit of Luck" - 4:31
4. "The Rain in Spain" - 3:02
5. "Get Me to the Church on Time" - 4:15
6. "Wouldn't It Be Loverly?" - 5:01
7. "I Could Have Danced All Night" - 4:00
8. "On the Street Where You Live" - 3:40

- Recorded in New York City on Jersey on January 8 (track 2), January 22 (tracks 3, 6 & 8) and February 5 (tracks 1, 4, 5 & 7), 1957

== Personnel ==
- Billy Taylor – piano
- Ernie Royal - trumpet
- Don Elliott - trumpet, mellophone, vibes, bongos
- Jimmy Cleveland - trombone
- Jim Buffington - French horn
- Don Butterfield (tracks 1, 2, 4, 5 & 7), Jay McAllister (tracks 3, 6 7 8) - tuba
- Anthony Ortega - alto saxophone, tenor saxophone
- Charlie Fowlkes - baritone saxophone, bass clarinet (tracks 2, 3, 6 & 8)
- Al Casamenti - guitar
- Earl May – bass
- Ed Thigpen – drums
- Quincy Jones - arranger, conductor
