= A Touch of Taylor =

Album by Billy Taylor

Studio album by Billy Taylor
- Released: 1955
- Recorded: April 10, 1955; Van Gelder Studio, Hackensack
- Genre: Jazz
- Label: Prestige; PRLP 7001

Billy Taylor chronology
Billy Taylor Trio at Town Hall (1954)	A Touch of Taylor (1955)	Evergreens (1956)

Professional ratings
Review scores
Source	Rating
Allmusic	3/5 stars
The Rolling Stone Jazz Record Guide	3/5 stars

A Touch of Taylor is an album by American jazz pianist Billy Taylor recorded in 1955 for the Prestige label. The album was the first 12-inch LP released by the label.

== Track listing ==
All compositions by Billy Taylor except as indicated

1. "Ever So Easy" - 3:16
2. "Radioactivity" - 3:45
3. "A Bientot" - 4:19
4. "Long Tom" - 2:48
5. "Day Dreaming" - 3:08
6. "Live It Up" - 2:50
7. "Purple Mood" (Al Collins) - 2:46
8. "Early Bird" - 3:00
9. "Blue Cloud" - 3:37
10. It's a Grand Night for Swinging" - 2:59
11. "Memories of Spring" (Willis Conover) - 3:54
12. "Daddy-O" - 3:13

== Personnel ==
- Billy Taylor – piano
- Earl May – bass
- Percy Brice – drums
