= Winard Harper =

American jazz drummer (born 1962)

- Birth name: Hiram Winard Harper
- Born: June 4, 1962 (age 62); Baltimore, Maryland
- Genres: Jazz
- Occupation: Musician
- Instrument: Drums
- Years active: 1980s–present
- Labels: Savant

Hiram Winard Harper (born June 4, 1962) is an American jazz drummer.

== Career ==
Harper played in the 1980s with Dexter Gordon, Johnny Griffin, and with Betty Carter for four years. While working with Carter he met Wycliffe Gordon, with whom Harper would collaborate repeatedly.

From 1988 to 1993 he worked with his brother, trumpeter Philip Harper, in the group The Harper Brothers, alongside Justin Robinson, Javon Jackson, Walter Blanding, Kiyoshi Kitagawa, Stephen Scott, Kevin Hays, Michael Bowie, and Nedra Wheeler.

After the dissolution of the Harper brothers, Winard recorded several albums as a leader. In the early 2000s he worked with his sextet and performed at Lincoln Center in New York City. He played with Avery Sharpe in 2008. He leads the group Jeli Posse.

== Discography ==
=== As leader ===
- Be Yourself (Epicure, 1994)
- Trap Dancer (Savant, 1998)
- Winard (Savant, 1999)
- A Time for the Soul (Savant, 2003)
- Come into the Light (Savant, 2004)
- Coexist (Jazz Legacy, 2012)

The Harper Brothers

- Remembrance Live at the Village Vanguard (Verve, 1990)
- Artistry (Verve, 1991)
- You Can Hide Inside the Music (Verve, 1992)

=== As sideman ===
With Ray Bryant

- Ray's Tribute to His Jazz Piano Friends (JMI, 1998)
- North of the Border (Label M, 2001)
- Godfather (M&I, 2011)

With Betty Carter

- Look What I Got! (Verve, 1988)
- Betty Carter (Verve, 1990)
- Betty Carter's Finest Hour (Verve, 2003)

With Wycliffe Gordon

- The Gospel Truth (Criss Cross, 2000)
- The Search (Nagel Heyer, 2007)

With Etta Jones

- Reverse the Charges (Muse, 1992)
- At Last (Muse, 1995)

With David "Fathead" Newman

- Under a Woodstock Moon (Kokopelli, 1996)
- Chillin' (HighNote, 1999)
- Keep the Spirits Singing (HighNote, 2001)
- The Gift (HighNote, 2003)
- I Remember Brother Ray (HighNote, 2005)

With Houston Person

- Why Not! (Muse, 1991)
- The Lion and His Pride (Muse, 1994)
- Christmas with Houston Person and Friends (Muse, 1994)

With Avery Sharpe

- Dragon Fly (JKNM, 2004)
- Legends & Mentors (JKNM, 2008)
- Autumn Moonlight (JKNM, 2009)
- Avery Sharpe Trio Live (JKNM, 2010)

With Billy Taylor

- Urban Griot (Soundpost, 2001)
- Live at IAJE New York (Soundpost, 2002)
- Taylor Made at the Kennedy Center (Kennedy Center Jazz, 2005)

With Frank Wess

- Surprise, Surprise! (Chiaroscuro, 1998)
- Once Is Not Enough (Labeth, 2009)
- Magic 101 (IPO, 2013)

With others

- Monty Alexander, Harlem-Kingston Express Vol. 2 (Motema, 2014)
- T. K. Blue, Amour (Dot Time, 2017)
- Don Braden, Organic (Epicure, 1995)
- Kenny Drew Jr., Kenny Drew Jr. (Antilles, 1991)
- Chico Freeman, Still Sensitive (India Navigation, 1995)
- Sara Lazarus, Give Me the Simple Life (Dreyfus, 2005)
- Curtis Lundy, Against All Odds (Justin Time, 1999)
- Herbie Mann, 65th Birthday Celebration (Lightyear, 1997)
- Carmen McRae, Betty Carter, The Carmen McRae Betty Carter Duets (Verve, 1996)
- Mark Murphy, Some Time Ago (HighNote, 2000)
- Mark Murphy, Links (HighNote, 2001)
- Tete Montoliu, En el San Juan (Nuevos Medios, 1996)
- Jimmy Owens, The Monk Project (IPO, 2011)
- Jimmy Ponder, Come On Down (Muse, 1991)
- Janis Siegel, I Wish You Love (Telarc, 2002)
- Harvie Swartz, In a Different Light (Bluemoon, 1990)
- Bross Townsend, I Love Jump Jazz (Claves Jazz, 1995)
- Nancy Wilson, Turned to Blue (MCG, 2006)
- Steve Turre, The Spirits Up Above (HighNote, 2004)
