= Christmas with Houston Person and Friends =

Studio album by Houston Person
- Released: 1994
- Recorded: July 22 & 29 and August 10, 1994
- Studio: M & I Recording Studios, New York City
- Genre: Jazz
- Length: 60:48
- Label: Muse; MCD 5530
- Producer: Houston Person

Houston Person chronology
The Lion and His Pride (1994)	Christmas with Houston Person and Friends (1994)	Horn to Horn (1996)

Christmas with Houston Person and Friends (also released as Santa Baby) is an album of Christmas music by saxophonist Houston Person that was released by Muse in 1994.

== Reception ==
Professional ratings
Review scores
Source	Rating
AllMusic	4/5 stars

In his review on AllMusic, Scott Yanow stated "Tenor-saxophonist Houston Person's Christmas album finds him jamming both newer songs and a few old classics. His warm tenor is featured with three different groups ... This well-rounded holiday album even sounds good in July".

== Track listing ==
1. "Santa Baby" (Joan Javits, Philip Springer) – 6:30
2. "Our First Christmas" (James Harris III, Terry Lewis) – 4:16
3. "A Christmas Love Song" (Johnny Mandel, Alan Bergman, Marilyn Bergman) – 5:25
4. "Blue Christmas" (Bill Hayes, Jay Johnson) – 6:51
5. "It's Christmas Time Baby" – 4:23
6. "Medley: I'll Be Home for Christmas/You're All I Want for Christmas" (Walter Kent, Kim Gannon/Seger Ellis) – 2:45
7. "Jingle Bells" (James Pierpont) – 4:46
8. "God Rest Ye Merry Gentlemen" (Traditional) – 4:27
9. "Merry Christmas Baby" (Lou Baxter, Johnny Moore) – 9:20
10. "What Are You Doing New Year's Eve?" (Frank Loesser) – 8:10
11. "Happy Hanukah My Friend" (Justin Wilde, Doug Konecky) – 3:55

== Personnel ==
- Houston Person – tenor saxophone
- Randy Johnston – guitar (tracks 4, 8, 9 & 10)
- Melvin Sparks – guitar, vocals (track 5)
- Benny Green (tracks 1, 5 & 7), Stan Hope (track 6), Mike Renzi (tracks 2, 3 & 11) – piano
- Cameron Brown (tracks 1, 5 & 7), Jay Leonhart (tracks 2, 3 & 11), Peter Martin Weiss (tracks 4, 8, 9 & 10) – bass
- Winard Harper (tracks 1, 5 & 7), Chip White (tracks 4, 8, 9 & 10) – drums
- Grady Tate – drums, vocals (tracks 2, 3 & 11)
- Della Griffin (track 7), Etta Jones (track 1) – vocals
