= Why Not! =

Studio album by Houston Person
- Released: 1991
- Recorded: October 5, 1990
- Studio: Van Gelder Studio, Englewood Cliffs, New Jersey
- Genre: Jazz
- Length: 50:36
- Label: Muse; MR 5433
- Producer: Houston Person

Houston Person chronology
Just Friends (1990)	Why Not! (1991)	The Lion and His Pride (1991)

Why Not! is an album by saxophonist Houston Person that was released by Muse in 1991.

== Reception ==
Professional ratings
Review scores
Source	Rating
AllMusic	4/5 stars

In his review on AllMusic, Scott Yanow stated "Houston Person's warm tenor tone, effortless swing, and skill at playing with organists have been taken for granted through the years, since he breaks no new boundaries and is very consistent. On this CD, he forged a new partnership with the young organist Joey DeFrancesco, and they work together perfectly on a set of blues, ballads and standards".

== Track listing ==
1. "Why Not" (Houston Person) – 10:54
2. "As Time Goes By" (Herman Hupfeld) – 5:34
3. "Namely You" (Gene de Paul, Johnny Mercer) – 6:32
4. "Where Is Love?" (Lionel Bart) – 7:02
5. "Joey's Blues" (Joey DeFrancesco) – 10:08
6. "Blue Gardenia" (Lester Lee, Bob Russell) – 5:13
7. "'Deed I Do" (Fred Rose, Walter Hirsch) – 5:13

== Personnel ==
- Houston Person – tenor saxophone
- Joey DeFrancesco – organ
- Philip Harper – trumpet
- Randy Johnston – guitar
- Winard Harper – drums
- Sammy Figueroa – percussion
