= Just Jazz =

Studio album by Buddy Tate and Al Grey
- Released: 1984
- Recorded: April 28, 1984
- Studios: Van Gelder Studio, Englewood Cliffs, NJ
- Genre: Jazz
- Length: 47:30 CD reissue with additional tracks
- Labels: Uptown; UP 27.21
- Producer: Mark Feldman

Buddy Tate chronology
The Ballad Artistry (1981)	Just Jazz (1984)	Just Friends (1992)

Al Grey chronology
Things Are Getting Better All the Time (1983)	Just Jazz (1984)	Al Grey and Jesper Thilo Quintet (1986)

Just Jazz, is an album by saxophonist Buddy Tate and trombonist Al Grey, which was recorded in 1984 and released by the Uptown label. The album was reissued on CD with two alternate takes by Reservoir in 1989.

== Reception ==
Professional ratings
Review scores
Source	Rating
AllMusic	4/5 stars
The Penguin Guide to Jazz Recordings	2.5/4 stars

On AllMusic Scott Yanow states, "Tenor-saxophonist Buddy Tate (who also contributes a bit of clarinet) blends in perfectly with trombonist Al Grey on this swinging quintet session ... Both Tate and Grey were in their late prime at the time".

== Track listing ==
1. "Just Jazz" (Al Grey) – 5:05
2. "Blues in My Heart" (Benny Carter, Irving Mills) – 6:19
3. "Straighten Up and Fly Right" (Nat King Cole, Mills) – 6:28
4. "Topsy" (Edgar Battle, Eddie Durham) – 6:46
5. "Blue Creek" (Buddy Tate) – 6:02
6. "Tangerine" (Victor Schertzinger, Johnny Mercer) – 6:21
7. "Straighten Up and Fly Right" [alternate take] (Cole, Mills) – 5:15 Additional track on CD reissue
8. "Just Jazz" [alternate take] (Grey) – 5:14 Additional track on CD reissue

== Personnel ==
- Buddy Tate – tenor saxophone, clarinet
- Al Grey – trombone
- Richard Wyands – piano
- Major Holley – double bass
- Al Harewood – drums
- Don Sickler – arranger
