= Billy Taylor Trio at Town Hall =

Live album by Billy Taylor
- Released: 1955
- Recorded: December 17, 1954; The Town Hall, New York City
- Genre: Jazz
- Label: Prestige; PRLP 7093

Billy Taylor chronology
The Billy Taylor Trio with Candido (1954)	Billy Taylor Trio at Town Hall (1955)	A Touch of Taylor (1955)

Professional ratings
Review scores
Source	Rating
Allmusic	3/5 stars

Billy Taylor Trio at Town Hall (also released as Live! at Town Hall) is a live album by American jazz pianist Billy Taylor recorded in 1954 and released on the Prestige label.

== Track listing ==
All compositions by Billy Taylor except as indicated

1. "A Foggy Day" (George Gershwin, Ira Gershwin) - 3:31
2. "I'll Remember April" (Gene de Paul, Patricia Johnston, Don Raye) - 4:09
3. "Sweet Georgia Brown" (Ben Bernie, Kenneth Casey, Maceo Pinkard) - 5:04
4. "How High the Moon" (Nancy Hamilton, Morgan Lewis) - 13:06
5. "Theodora" - 4:39

== Personnel ==
- Billy Taylor - piano
- Earl May - bass
- Percy Brice - drums
