= Philip Harper (trumpeter) =

American jazz trumpeter (born 1965)

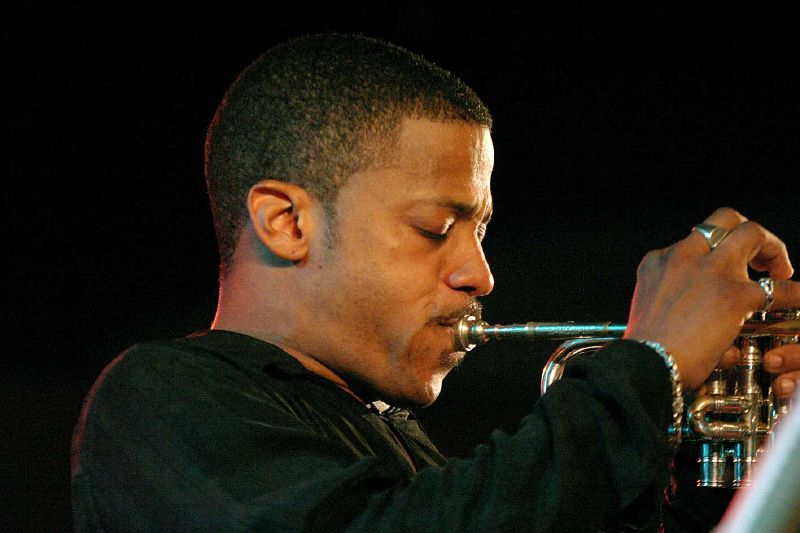
- Photo: Tom Beetz

Background information
- Born: May 10, 1965 (age 60); Baltimore, Maryland, U.S.
- Genres: Jazz
- Occupation: Musician
- Instrument: Trumpet
- Years active: 1990–present
- Labels: Verve, Muse

Philip Harper (born May 10, 1965) is an American jazz trumpeter.

== Early life ==
Born in Baltimore, Maryland, Harper grew up in Atlanta. He studied under Jackie McLean at the University of Hartford Hartt School.

== Career ==
Harper played with the Jazz Messengers and Mingus Big Band. He also signed with Verve Records and produced four albums for them.

From 1988 to 1993, Harper played in the Harper Brothers with his brother, Winard. Other band members included Justin Robinson on alto saxophone, Stephen Scott on piano and Michael Bowie on bass.

== Discography ==
- 1988 Harper Brothers (Verve)
- 1989 Remembrance: Live at the Village Vanguard (Verve)
- 1991 Artistry (Verve)
- 1992 You Can Hide Inside the Music (Verve)
- 1993 Soulful Sin (Muse)
- 1994 The Thirteenth Moon (Muse)

With Cecil Brooks III

- Hangin' with Smooth (Muse, 1990)

With Etta Jones

- Reverse the Charges (Muse, 1992)

With Houston Person

- Why Not! (Muse, 1991)
- The Lion and His Pride (Muse, 1991 [1994])
