= Accent on Tenor Sax =

Studio album by Coleman Hawkins
- Released: 1956
- Recorded: May 10, 1955
- Studio: NYC
- Genre: Jazz
- Length: 40:16
- Label: Urania; UJLP 1201
- Producer: Dr. Sidney Gross

Coleman Hawkins chronology
Timeless Jazz (1954)	Accent on Tenor Sax (1956)	The Hawk in Hi Fi (1956)

Accent on Tenor Sax is an album by saxophonist Coleman Hawkins which was recorded in 1955 for the Urania label.

== Reception ==
Professional ratings
Review scores
Source	Rating
AllMusic	3/5 stars

Ron Wynn on AllMusic states, "A mid-'50s tenor sax workout by the immortal soloist Coleman Hawkins. This was originally issued on Urania and wasn't spectacular, but did have some nicely played blues and ballads".

== Track listing ==
1. "I'll Never Be the Same" (Matty Malneck, Frank Signorelli) – 7:13
2. "Blue Room" (Richard Rodgers, Lorenz Hart) – 4:44
3. "When Your Lover Has Gone" (Einar Aaron Swan) – 4:59
4. "Running Wild" (A.H. Gibbs, Joe Grey, Leo Wood) – 3:23
5. "The Breeze and I" (Ernesto Lecuona) – 3:18
6. "What's New?" (Bob Haggart, Johnny Burke) – 5:48
7. "I'll String Along with You" (Harry Warren, Al Dubin) – 4:48
8. "My Own Blues" (Coleman Hawkins) – 6:03

== Personnel ==
- Coleman Hawkins – tenor saxophone
- Ernie Royal – trumpet
- Eddie Bert – trombone (tracks 2, 3, 6 & 8)
- Earl Knight – piano, organ
- Sidney Gross – guitar
- Wendell Marshall – bass
- Osie Johnson – drums
