= Timeless Jazz =

Studio album by Coleman Hawkins and His All Stars
- Released: 1955
- Recorded: November 8, 1954
- Studio: NYC
- Genre: Jazz
- Length: 68:47 Reissue with additional tracks
- Label: Jazztone; J-1201
- Producer: George T. Simon

Coleman Hawkins chronology
The Hawk Returns (1953–54)	Timeless Jazz (1955)	Accent on Tenor Sax (1955)

Jazz Tones Cover

Timeless Jazz is an album by saxophonist Coleman Hawkins which was recorded in 1954 for the mail order Jazztone label and rereleased as Jazz Tones on Xanadu Records in 1982.

== Reception ==
Professional ratings
Review scores
Source	Rating
AllMusic	3/5 stars

Ken Dryden on AllMusic states, "This 1954 studio date by Coleman Hawkins finds the tenor saxophonist in great form ... There are many strong solos by the supporting cast, but it's difficult to eclipse the sound of Hawkins' tenor when he is in top form".

== Track listing ==
All compositions by Coleman Hawkins except where noted.

1. "Cheek to Cheek" (Irving Berlin) – 7:56
2. "Lullaby of Birdland" (George Shearing, George David Weiss) – 5:10
3. "If I Had You" (Irving King, Ted Shapiro) – 4:29
4. "Get Happy" (Harold Arlen, Ted Koehler) – 5:29
5. "Honeysuckle Rose" (Fats Waller, Andy Razaf) – 2:59 Additional track not on original release
6. "Blue Lou" (Edgar Sampson, Irving Mills) – 4:59
7. "Out of Nowhere" (Johnny Green, Edward Heyman) – 5:38
8. "Undecided" (Charlie Shavers, Sid Robin) – 4:46 Additional track not on original release
9. "Stompin' at the Savoy" (Sampson, Razaf, Benny Goodman, Chick Webb) – 6:10
10. "Ain't Misbehavin'" (Fats Waller, Harry Brooks, Razaf) – 7:26
11. "Just You, Just Me" (Jesse Greer, Raymond Klages) – 6:03
12. "Time on My Hands" (Vincent Youmans, Harold Adamson, Mack Gordon) – 7:42 Additional track not on original release

== Personnel ==
- Coleman Hawkins – tenor saxophone
- Emmett Berry – trumpet
- Eddie Bert – trombone
- Billy Taylor – piano
- Milt Hinton – bass
- Jo Jones – drums
