= Uptown (Billy Taylor album) =

Live album by Billy Taylor
- Released: 1960
- Recorded: February 4, 1960; The Prelude, New York City
- Genre: Jazz
- Length: 42:44
- Label: Riverside; RLP 12-319
- Producer: Orrin Keepnews

Billy Taylor chronology
Taylor Made Jazz (1959)	Uptown (1960)	Warming Up! (1960)

Uptown is a live album by American jazz pianist Billy Taylor featuring tracks recorded in 1960 and released on the Riverside label.

== Reception ==
Professional ratings
Review scores
Source	Rating
Allmusic	3/5 stars

Allmusic awarded the album 3 stars stating "Although Taylor's activities as a highly articulate spokesman for jazz have sometimes overshadowed his playing, he shows throughout this fine CD reissue that he has long ranked among the best".

== Track listing ==
All compositions by Billy Taylor except as indicated

1. "La Petite Mambo" (Erroll Garner) - 5:45
2. "Jordu" (Duke Jordan) - 4:10
3. "Just the Thought of You" - 4:59
4. "Soul Sisters" - 5:36
5. "Moanin'" (Bobby Timmons) - 5:13
6. "Warm Blue Stream" (Sara Cassey, Dotty Wayne) - 4:55
7. "Biddy's Beat" - 4:14
8. "Cu-Blu" - 4:01
9. "'S Wonderful" (George Gershwin, Ira Gershwin) - 3:51

== Personnel ==
- Billy Taylor - piano
- Henry Grimes - bass
- Ray Mosca - drums
