= Cross Section (album) =

Studio album by Billy Taylor
- Released: 1956
- Recorded: May 7, 1953 and July 30, 1954; New York City and Van Gelder Studio, Hackensack, NJ
- Genre: Jazz
- Length: 35:51
- Label: Prestige; PRLP 7071

Billy Taylor chronology
| Billy Taylor Trio (1955) | Cross Section (1956) | The Billy Taylor Trio with Candido (1955) |

Cross Section is an album by American jazz pianist Billy Taylor featuring tracks recorded in 1953 and 1954 for the Prestige label. The album rereleased eight tracks from 1954 which had originally been issued on the 10-inch LP Billy Taylor Plays for DJs along with four Mambo sides from 1953.

== Reception ==
Professional ratings
Review scores
| Source | Rating |
|---|---|
| Allmusic | 4/5 stars |
| The Penguin Guide to Jazz Recordings | 2.5/4 stars |

The Allmusic review by Scott Yanow stated: "the four originals (which alternate with standards) were all dedicated to disc jockeys of the time. The trio was pretty tight with Taylor in the lead and, although boppish, it also looked back toward the swing era... The four mambos are ideal both for listening and for dance music. An enjoyable set".

== Track listing ==
All compositions by Billy Taylor, except where noted.

1. "Eddie's Theme" – 2:45
2. "Mood for Mendes" – 3:06
3. "Lullaby of Birdland" (George Shearing, George David Weiss) – 2:52
4. "Goodbye" (Gordon Jenkins) – 3:21
5. "Tune for Tex" – 2:56
6. "Moonlight in Vermont" (John Blackburn, Karl Suessdorf) – 3:44
7. "Biddy's Beat" – 3:09
8. "I'll Be Around" (Alec Wilder) – 2:48
9. "I Love to Mambo" – 2:53
10. "Candido Mambo" – 3:08
11. "Early Morning Mambo" – 2:53
12. "Mambo Azul" – 2:16

Note

- Recorded in New York City on May 7, 1953 (tracks 9–12) and at Van Gelder Studio in Hackensack, New Jersey on July 30, 1954 (tracks 1–8)

== Personnel ==
- Billy Taylor – piano
- Earl May – bass
- Charlie Smith – drums, congas
- Machito – maracas
- José Mangual – bongos
- Ubaldo Nieto – timbales
