= Billy Taylor with Four Flutes =

Studio album by Billy Taylor
- Released: 1959
- Recorded: July 20 & 24, 1959; New York City
- Genre: Jazz
- Length: 41:27
- Label: Riverside; RLP 12-306
- Producer: Orrin Keepnews

Billy Taylor chronology
One for Fun (1959)	Billy Taylor with Four Flutes (1959)	Taylor Made Jazz (1959)

Professional ratings
Review scores
Source	Rating
Allmusic	4/5 stars
The Penguin Guide to Jazz Recordings	2.5/4 stars

Billy Taylor with Four Flutes is an album by American jazz pianist Billy Taylor featuring tracks recorded in 1959 for the Riverside label.

== Reception ==
Allmusic awarded the album 4 stars with reviewer Scott Yanow calling it "essentially bop, but the unusual instrumentation gives the set its own personality. Enjoyable music that certainly stands out from the crowd".

== Track listing ==
All compositions by Billy Taylor except as indicated

1. "The Song Is Ended" (Irving Berlin) - 3:54
2. "Back Home" - 6:44
3. "St. Thomas" (Sonny Rollins) - 2:28
4. "Oh, Lady Be Good" (George Gershwin, Ira Gershwin) - 4:40
5. "No Parking" - 2:53
6. "Koolbongo" (Mary Lou Williams) - 4:18
7. "Blue Shutters" - 6:54
8. "One for the Woofer" - 4:42
9. "How About You?" (Ralph Freed, Burton Lane) - 4:54
- Recorded in New York City on July 20 (tracks 1, 2 & 7–9) and July 24 (tracks 3–6), 1959.

== Personnel ==
- Billy Taylor - piano
- Phil Bodner (tracks 1, 2 & 7–9), Herbie Mann (tracks 1–4 & 6–9), Seldon Powell (track 5), Jerome Richardson (tracks 1–6 & 8), Jerry Sanfino (tracks 3–6), Bill Slapin (tracks 3–7 & 9), Frank Wess (tracks 1, 2 & 7–9) - flute
- Tommy Williams - bass
- Dave Bailey (tracks 1, 2 & 7–9), Albert Heath (tracks 3–6) - drums
- Chino Pozo - congas
