= One for Fun =

Studio album by Billy Taylor
- Released: 1959
- Recorded: June 24, 1959; Atlantic Studios, New York City
- Genre: Jazz
- Label: Atlantic; 1329
- Producer: Nesuhi Ertegun

Billy Taylor chronology
The New Billy Taylor Trio (1957)	One for Fun (1959)	Billy Taylor with Four Flutes (1959)

One for Fun is an album by American jazz pianist Billy Taylor released in 1959 on the Atlantic label.

== Reception ==
Professional ratings
Review scores
Source	Rating
Allmusic	3/5 stars

Allmusic awarded the album 3 stars.

== Track listing ==
All compositions by Billy Taylor except as indicated

1. "Summertime" (George Gershwin, DuBose Heyward) - 3:45
2. "One for Fun" - 3:32
3. "That's for Sure" - 1:53
4. "A Little Southside Soul" - 4:23
5. "Blue Moon" (Richard Rodgers, Lorenz Hart) - 5:04
6. "Makin' Whoopee" (Walter Donaldson, Gus Kahn) - 4:24
7. "Poinciana" (Nat Simon, Buddy Bernier) - 5:28
8. "At Long Last Love" (Cole Porter) - 3:31
9. "When Lights Are Low" (Benny Carter, Spencer Williams) - 5:04

== Personnel ==
- Billy Taylor - piano
- Earl May - bass
- Kenny Dennis - drums
