= Kwamina (album) =

Studio album by Billy Taylor
- Released: 1961
- Recorded: September 12–14, 1961; New York City
- Genre: Jazz
- Length: 32:41
- Label: Mercury; MG 20654

Billy Taylor chronology
| Interlude (1961) | Kwamina (1961) | Impromptu (1962) |

Kwamina is an album by American jazz pianist Billy Taylor featuring jazz interpretations of compositions from the Broadway musical Kwamina written by Richard Adler which was recorded in 1961 and released on the Mercury label.

The album was recorded about a month before Kwamina premiered on Broadway, while it was still in tryouts in Toronto. The song "Happy Is the Cricket" was subsequently cut from the show, but a version of this song is nevertheless included on the album.

== Reception ==
Professional ratings
Review scores
| Source | Rating |
|---|---|
| Allmusic | 3/5 stars |

Allmusic awarded the album 3 stars stating "the music never seriously grabs the listener's attention, though the musicians are playing up to the level one expects of them. Serious Billy Taylor fans will undoubtedly still want to search for this obscure, long unavailable record".

== Track listing ==
All compositions by Richard Adler

1. "Something Big" - 3:36
2. "I'm Seeing Rainbows" - 2:54
3. "Ordinary People" - 4:21
4. "The Cocoa Bean Song" - 3:12
5. "What's Wrong With Me" - 2:53
6. "Nothing More to Look Forward To" - 4:34
7. "Another Time, Another Place" - 3:40
8. "Happy Is the Cricket" - 4:23
9. "Sun Is Beginning to Crow" - 3:08

== Personnel ==
- Billy Taylor - piano
- Clark Terry - trumpet, flugelhorn
- Julius Watkins - French horn
- Jimmy Cleveland - trombone
- Phil Woods - alto saxophone
- Frank Wess - tenor saxophone
- Jerome Richardson - baritone saxophone
- Les Spann - guitar
- George Duvivier - bass
- Osie Johnson - drums
- Jimmy Jones Jr. - arranger
