= The New Billy Taylor Trio =

Studio album by Billy Taylor
- Released: 1958
- Recorded: October 25 and December 16 & 17, 1957; New York City
- Genre: Jazz
- Length: 41:53
- Label: ABC-Paramount; S-226
- Producer: Creed Taylor

Billy Taylor chronology
| The Billy Taylor Touch (1957) | The New Billy Taylor Trio (1958) | One for Fun (1959) |

The New Billy Taylor Trio is the album by American jazz pianist Billy Taylor released in 1958 on the ABC-Paramount label.

== Reception ==
Professional ratings
Review scores
| Source | Rating |
|---|---|
| Allmusic | 3/5 stars |

Allmusic stated "Half of the tracks consist of standards ...all played with the kind of lyricism and warm technique that Taylor has exhibited over the many decades following the making of this album. Even more compelling are the remaining songs, two of which are originals".

== Track listing ==
All compositions by Billy Taylor except as indicated

1. "There Will Never Be Another You" (Harry Warren, Mack Gordon) - 4:55
2. "Sounds in the Night" - 6:32
3. "The More I See You" (Warren, Gordon) - 4:17
4. "Will You Still Be Mine" (Matt Dennis, Tom Adair) - 4:05
5. "'Round Midnight" (Thelonious Monk, Cootie Williams, Bernie Hanighen) - 6:27
6. "There's a Small Hotel" (Richard Rodgers, Lorenz Hart) - 4:09
7. "I Never Get Enough of You" (Bob Haymes) - 4:30
8. "Titoro" - 6:58

The CD, titled simply Billy Taylor Trio, with the same cover art contains 4 extra tunes from the same sessions, that produced the LP.

== Personnel ==
- Billy Taylor - piano
- Earl May - bass
- Ed Thigpen - drums
