= The Hawk Returns =

Studio album by Coleman Hawkins
- Released: 1954
- Genre: Jazz
- Label: Savoy Records reissue of session for Al Benson's Parrot records

Coleman Hawkins chronology
The Hawk Talks (1952)	The Hawk Returns (1954)	Timeless Jazz (1954)

Professional ratings
Review scores
Source	Rating
AllMusic	2/5 stars

The Hawk Returns is an album by Coleman Hawkins, released in 1954 on Savoy Records.

Other musicians on the album were uncredited; however, the 1953-1954 entry in the Chronological Classics series (which includes these recordings) lists organist Les Strand and guitarist Leo Blevins on the first six tracks.

== Track listing ==
1. "Goin' Down Home" Ozzie Cadena
2. "I'll Follow My Secret Heart" Noël Coward
3. "On My Way" Ozzie Cadena
4. "I'll Tell You Later" Adam Brenner
5. "What a Diff'rence a Day Made" Stanley Adams (singer) María Grever
6. "Last Stop" Ozzie Cadena
7. "Should I?" Nacio Herb Brown Arthur Freed
8. "Flight Eleven" Coleman Hawkins
9. "Modern Fantasy" Coleman Hawkins
10. "Confessin'" Doc Daugherty Al J. Neiburg Ellis Reynolds
11. "September Song" Maxwell Anderson Kurt Weill
12. "They Can't Take That Away from Me" George Gershwin Ira Gershwin
