= Irvin Stokes =

American jazz musician (1926–2007)

Irvin Sonny Stokes (November 11, 1926 – April 20, 2007) was an American jazz trumpeter.

== Life and career ==
Stokes was born in Greensboro, North Carolina on November 11, 1926. He moved to New York City in 1947 and recorded with a Charlie Singleton sextet in 1949. Throughout the 1950s he worked in the big bands of Tiny Bradshaw, Duke Ellington, Mercer Ellington, Erskine Hawkins, Buddy Johnson, Andy Kirk, and Jimmie Lunceford. In 1959-60 he played in Austin Powell's ensemble, then went on to record with Bobby Donaldson and Lou Donaldson in the early 1960s.

Stokes was involved principally with Broadway musical bands in the 1970s such as Hair, though in 1978 he also played on the Thad Jones-Mel Lewis Orchestra's tour of Europe, and with Panama Francis at the end of the decade. His credits in the 1980s included George Kelly, Illinois Jacquet, Oliver Jackson, and the Count Basie Orchestra. Stokes was a regular performer alongside Spanky Davis at Doc Cheatham's Sunday brunch gig at the Sweet Basil Jazz Club, continuing in this role after Cheatham's death in 1997, when Chuck Folds took over. He also played with the Statesmen of Jazz late in the 1990s.

Stokes died in The Bronx, New York City on April 20, 2007, at the age of 80.

== Sources ==
- Howard Rye, "Irvin Stokes". The New Grove Dictionary of Jazz, 2nd edition, ed. Barry Kernfeld.
