= Jane Jarvis =

American jazz pianist (1915–2010)

- Jarvis in 1984

Background information
- Born: Louella Jane Nossette; October 31, 1915; Vincennes, Indiana, U.S.
- Died: January 25, 2010 (aged 94) Englewood, New Jersey
- Genre: Jazz
- Occupations: Musician, programmer for Muzak
- Instruments: Piano, organ

Jane Jarvis (née Nossette; October 31, 1915 – January 25, 2010) was an American jazz pianist. She was also known for her work as a composer, baseball stadium organist, and music industry executive.

== Life and career ==
Jarvis was born in Vincennes, Indiana, to Charles and Luella Nossette. She was recognized as a piano prodigy at the age of five and she studied under a Vincennes University professor as a young girl. Her family moved to Gary, Indiana soon afterward, and Jarvis was hired to play the piano at radio station WJKS in Gary in 1927. She was orphaned at 13 when her parents died in a train-auto wreck and returned to Vincennes, graduating from high school in 1932. She continued her studies at the Chicago Conservatory of Music, the Bush Conservatory of Music, Loyola University Chicago and DePauw University.

By 1954, Jarvis was on television at station WTMJ-TV in Milwaukee, hosting a show called "Jivin' with Jarvis" while serving as staff pianist and organist. At the time, the Milwaukee Braves had just relocated from Boston and sought her out to be the organist at Milwaukee County Stadium. In a 1984 interview, Jarvis told John S. Wilson of The New York Times that she asked when she would get to perform and a Braves official replied, "When the umpire says 'Three outs.'" Jarvis, a sports neophyte, then asked, "And when would that be?"

Jarvis stayed with the Braves for eight seasons and then went to New York City, where she took a position with Muzak corporation as a staff composer and arranger. She would rise to become a corporate vice-president and its director of recording and programming.

In 1964, she was hired by the New York Mets to play the organ at Shea Stadium. She is remembered at Shea for playing the Mets theme song, "Meet The Mets" (music and lyrics by Ruth Roberts and Bill Katz), which debuted in the 1963 season before every home game, followed by the Jarvis composed "Let's Go Mets", as the team took the field.

Jarvis left Muzak in 1978, and the next year left the Mets to concentrate on her first musical love, jazz piano. She became a fixture at New York nightclubs, frequently playing alongside bassist Milt Hinton. She became a founding member of the Statesmen of Jazz, a group of jazz musicians aged 65 and older sponsored by the American Federation of Jazz Societies, and was featured on their 1994 album. She performed with this group across the US as well as in Japan and elsewhere.

Jarvis released several albums of her jazz piano work, including Jane Jarvis Jams at AllMusic (1995) and Atlantic/Pacific at AllMusic (2000). JazzTimes described Jane as "a wonderful ensemble player; her musical knowledge is encyclopedic and her musical communication is topnotch." In addition to Hinton, Jarvis has often collaborated with trombonist Benny Powell and bassist Earl May. As a member of ASCAP, she also had over three hundred compositions to her credit.

Married and divorced three times, Jarvis lived in Cocoa Beach, Florida, where she was honored in 2003 by the Space Coast Jazz Society for her lifetime achievement. Following a move back to New York, she was displaced from her residence in 2008 when a construction crane collapsed, damaging her building on East 50th Street.

Jarvis spent the final years of her life at the Lillian Booth Actors Home in Englewood, New Jersey.

== Discography ==
=== As leader ===
- Atlantic–Pacific (Arbors)
- Jane Jarvis Jams (Arbors)

=== With others ===
With Statesmen of Jazz

- Statesmen of Jazz
