= Urban Griot =

Studio album by Billy Taylor
- Released: August 28, 2001
- Recorded: November 13, December 9, 2000
- Studio: Manhattan Center Studios, New York
- Genre: Jazz
- Label: Soundpost
- Producer: Billy Taylor

Urban Griot is an album by Billy Taylor, featuring tracks recorded in 2000 and released by Soundpost Records.

== Recording and music ==
The album was recorded at Manhattan Center Studios, New York, on November 13 and December 9, 2000. Pianist Taylor's trio for the recording contained bassist Chip Jackson and drummer Winard Harper. The ten pieces were written as pedagogical material for the Wharton Center for Performing Arts at Michigan State University. Some have melodies that use fourths; others are based on rhythms that would be familiar to students. "Local Color / Can You Dig It?" uses rhythms similar to those found in hip hop; "Reclamation" is a waltz; and "Gracias Chucho" contains Latin rhythms. One track, "Spoken", is a spoken-word dedication to a dead child.

Taylor said that he regarded his role as an educator to be like that of a griot, explaining the album's title: "I am like an urban griot, bringing a sense of history and continuity to teaching music."

== Release and reception ==
Urban Griot was released by Soundpost on August 28, 2001. The AllMusic reviewer concluded that, of the albums in Taylor's catalog, "this recording should be one of the first acquired". The JazzTimes reviewer expressed admiration for Taylor's piano playing, but wrote that the spoken-word track "comes out like an awkward public-service announcement and breaks the vibe".

== Track listing ==
All compositions by Billy Taylor.

1. "Local Color / Can You Dig It?" – 4:25
2. "Reclamation" – 5:49
3. "Gracias Chucho" – 2:54
4. "Etude" – 4:06
5. "Conversion" – 4:44
6. "Spoken" – 1:38
7. "In Loving Memory" – 6:13
8. "Like a Heartbeat" – 4:16
9. "Invention / Looking for Another Theme" – 5:35
10. "Transformation" – 8:30
11. "A Duke-ish Blues" – 5:52

== Personnel ==
- Billy Taylor – piano
- Chip Jackson – bass
- Winard Harper – drums
