= Carnegie Hall Jazz Band =

American big band (1991–2002)

The Carnegie Hall Jazz Band was a big band organized in 1991 by George Wein. Its musical director was Jon Faddis.

The group gave its first performance in October 1992, and gave concerts paying tribute to classic jazz musicians as well as new commissions or arrangements from living composers, including Muhal Richard Abrams, Toshiko Akiyoshi, Garnett Brown, John Clayton, Slide Hampton, Jimmy Heath, Dick Hyman, Jim McNeely, Randy Sandke, Maria Schneider, Frank Foster, Manny Albam, Michael Philip Mossman and Dennis Wilson. The band did worldwide tours in the period 1994–1996 with new members including Renee Rosnes, Ryan Kisor, and recorded several albums. It was active until 2002, when the new director of Carnegie Hall eliminated support for it in the 2002–2003 season.

== Discography ==
- The Carnegie Hall Salutes the Jazz Masters (Verve, 1994)
- The Carnegie Hall Jazz Band / Music Director Jon Faddis (Blue Note, 1996)
- Eastwood After Hours – Live At Carnegie Hall (Malpaso/Warner Bros., 1997)
