= Warming Up! =

Studio album by Billy Taylor
- Released: 1960
- Recorded: March 26, 1960; New York City
- Genre: Jazz
- Label: Riverside; RLP 12-339
- Producer: Esmond Edwards

Billy Taylor chronology
Uptown (1960)	Warming Up! (1960)	Interlude (1961)

Warming Up! is an album by American jazz pianist Billy Taylor featuring tracks recorded in 1960 and released on the Riverside label. The recordings were first released as Custom Taylored on a SESAC "electronic transcription" to promote SESAC-controlled material to radio stations and re-released as Easy Like on the Surrey label in 1966.

== Reception ==
Professional ratings
Review scores
Source	Rating
Allmusic	3/5 stars

Allmusic awarded the album 3 stars.

== Track listing ==
All compositions by Billy Taylor except as indicated

1. "Warming Up" - 2:29
2. "Easy Like" (Teddy Castion, Taylor) - 2:36
3. "That's Where It Is" - 2:45
4. "Native Dancer" - 2:31
5. "Coffee Break" - 3:05
6. "Afterthoughts" - 2:51
7. "Easy Walker" - 2:46
8. "Lonesome Lover" - 2:29
9. "Don't Bug Me" - 2:36
10. "You Know What I Mean" - 3:04
11. "Uncle Fuzzy" - 2:36
12. "No Aftertaste" - 3:08

== Personnel ==
- Billy Taylor – piano
- Henry Grimes – bass
- Ray Mosca – drums
