= Griot (rapper) =

Swiss rapper

Griot, also known as Brewz Bana, is a rapper from Basel, Switzerland. Formerly known as Mory, he released several records and mix-tapes, until he was finally signed by Universal Records, Switzerland.

== Discography ==
=== Albums ===
==== As Mory ====
- 1998 S'Rosebett (EP)
- 1999 Dynamit (Mixtape)
- 2000 Limited Edition (EP)
- 2002 S neue Testament

==== As Griot ====
Selected chart positions
Title	Details	Peak chart positions
Title	Details	SWI
Fuck Off Tape	Mixtape; Released: 2003; Mixed by Jake	–
Game Over	Mixtape; Released: 2004; Mixed by DJ Sweap	–
Killer Tape	Mixtape; Released: 2004; Mixed by DJ Sweap	–
Strossegold	Released: 2006	18
Strosseparade	Mixtape; Released: 2007	64
miCH	Released: 2010	31

=== Singles ===
- 2006 Movement
- 2007 Innercity Blues (feat. Ginjah)
