= Urania Records =

American record label (e. 1951)

- Founded: April 15, 1951
- Founder: Rudolf Koppl (1895–1956)
- Status: Inactive
- Genre: Classical, jazz
- Country of origin: United States
- Location: Belleville, New Jersey

Urania Records, Inc. was an American record label founded April 15, 1951, by Czech-born New York industrialist Rudolf Koppl (1895–1956), who served as its founding president.

== History ==
Urania Records initially released opera recordings from East Germany. The label was later run by Rudolph's son, Werner J. Koppl (1923–1996), also Czech-born, who, on March 23, 1956, sold Urania to American Sound Corporation – Daken Karl Broadhead (1905–1999), chairman; and Siegfried Bart (né Siegfried Gerold Bart; 1913–1997), president. American Sound was a joint venture of Allied Record Manufacturing Company (founded 1933) of Hollywood and Bart Manufacturing Company of Belleville, New Jersey. American Sound took over actual operations of Urania April 16, 1956. In 1958, American Sound Corporation sold Urania Records to Bart Manufacturing Corporation, which henceforth ran Urania as its subsidiary based in Belleville, New Jersey. Simultaneously in 1958, American Sound, itself, was sold to Allied Record Manufacturing Company, which was headed by Daken Karl Broadhead from 1945 to 1979 as president and principal owner. In 1979, Allied was sold to Warner Communications and became part of WEA Manufacturing.

== Disambiguation ==
Urania Records of this article is not to be confused with the Italian-based classical label, Urania Records, founded in 1998.
