= Jimmy Lewis (bassist) =

American bassist

- Born: April 11, 1918 Nashville, Tennessee, U.S.
- Died: March 2, 2000 (aged 81) New York City
- Genres: Jazz, R&B, soul
- Occupation: Musician
- Instrument(s): Double bass, bass guitar
- Years active: 1950s to 1980s
- Formerly of: Count Basie Orchestra

Jimmy Lewis (April 11, 1918 – March 2, 2000) was an American double bassist who worked with the Count Basie Orchestra and sextet in the 1950s and with Duke Ellington, Cootie Williams, Billie Holiday and Ivory Joe Hunter before moving to bass guitar during his time with King Curtis. He provided the basslines for the musical Hair. Lewis freelanced extensively and performed on many albums by soul and jazz musicians, including Horace Silver and the Modern Jazz Quartet up until the late 1980s. He died in 2000.

== Discography ==
With Count Basie

- Basie Jazz (Clef, 1954)
- Dance Session Album #2 (Clef, 1954)
- The Count! (Clef, 1955)
- Blues by Basie (Columbia, 1956)

With Solomon Burke

- If You Need Me (Atlantic, 1963)
- King Solomon (Atlantic, 1968)
- I Wish I Knew (Atlantic, 1968)

With Billy Butler

- Yesterday, Today & Tomorrow (Prestige, 1970)

With Al Casey

- Buck Jumpin' (Swingville, 1960)
- The Al Casey Quartet (Moodsville, 1960)

With David Clayton-Thomas

- David Clayton-Thomas (Columbia, 1972)

With King Curtis

- Have Tenor Sax Will Blow (Atco, 1959)
- Trouble In Mind (Tru-Sound, 1962)
- It's Party Time With King Curtis (Tru-Sound, 1962)
- The Great King Curtis (Clarion, 1964)

With Lou Donaldson

- Everything I Play Is Funky (Blue Note, 1970)
- Pretty Things (Blue Note, 1970)

With Byrdie Green

- The Golden Thursh Strikes at Midnight (Prestige, 1966)
- I Got It Bad (And That Ain't Good) (Prestige, 1967)
- Sister Byrdie! (Prestige, 1968)

With Grant Green

- Carryin' On (Blue Note, 1969)
- Green Is Beautiful (Blue Note, 1970)

With Tiny Grimes

- Profoundly Blue (Muse, 1973)

With John P. Hammond

- Big City Blues (Vanguard, 1964)
- So Many Roads (Vanguard, 1965)
- Mirrors (Vanguard, 1967)
- I Can Tell (Atlantic, 1967)

With Richard "Groove" Holmes

- Super Soul (Prestige, 1967)
- Soul Power! (Prestige, 1967)

With Alberta Hunter

- The Glory of Alberta Hunter (Columbia, 1982)
- Look for the Silver Lining (Columbia, 1983)

With Willis Jackson

- Together Again, Again (Prestige, 1966) - with Brother Jack McDuff
- Star Bag (Prestige, 1968)
- In the Alley (Muse, 1976)
- Single Action (Muse, 1978) - with Pat Martino

With Boogaloo Joe Jones

- Right On Brother (Prestige, 1970)
- No Way! (Prestige, 1970)
- What It Is (Prestige, 1971)
- Snake Rhythm Rock (Prestige, 1972)

With Charles Kynard

- The Soul Brotherhood (Prestige, 1969)
- Afro-Disiac (Prestige, 1970)
- Wa-Tu-Wa-Zui (Beautiful People) (Prestige, 1970)

With Barbara Lewis

- Baby, I'm Yours (Atlantic, 1965)

With Johnny Lytle

- Good Vibes (Muse, 1982)

With Freddie McCoy

- Listen Here (Prestige, 1968)

With Galt MacDermot

- Shapes of Rhythm (Kilamanjaro, 1966)
- Hair (Original Off-Broadway Cast Recording) (RCA, 1967)
- Hair (Original Broadway Cast Recording) (RCA, 1968)
- Galt MacDermot's First Natural Hair Band (United Artists, 1970)
- Up from the Basement (Kilmarnock, 2003)

With The Modern Jazz Quartet

- Jazz Dialogue (Atlantic, 1965)

With Idris Muhammad

- Black Rhythm Revolution! (Prestige, 1970)
- Peace and Rhythm (Prestige, 1971)

With Mark Murphy

- Living Room (Muse, 1984)

With Houston Person

- Person to Person! (Prestige, 1970)

With Sonny Phillips

- Black on Black! (Prestige, 1970)

With Wilson Pickett

- In the Midnight Hour (Atlantic, 1965)

With Dave Pike

- Jazz for the Jet Set (Atlantic, 1966)

With Arthur Prysock

- This Guy's In Love With You (Milestone, 1987)

With Horace Silver

- That Healin' Feelin' (Blue Note, 1970)

With Johnny "Hammond" Smith

- Gettin' Up (Prestige, 1967)
- Soul Flowers (Prestige, 1967)
- Dirty Grape (Prestige, 1968)
- Black Feeling! (Prestige, 1969)
- Here It 'Tis (Prestige, 1970)
- What's Going On (Prestige, 1971)

With Buddy Terry

- Natural Soul (Prestige, 1968)

With Charles Williams

- Trees and Grass and Things (Mainstream, 1971)
