= Sure 'Nuff =

Studio album by Sonny Phillips
- Released: 1970
- Recorded: October 20, 1969
- Studio: Van Gelder Studio, Englewood Cliffs, New Jersey
- Genre: Jazz
- Length: 35:35
- Label: Prestige; PR 7737
- Producer: Bob Porter

Sonny Phillips chronology
Sure 'Nuff (1970)	Black Magic (1970)

Sure 'Nuff is the debut album by jazz organist Sonny Phillips which was recorded in 1969 and released on the Prestige label.

== Reception ==
Professional ratings
Review scores
Source	Rating
Allmusic	4/5 stars

Allmusic awarded the album 4 stars stating "Sure 'Nuff isn't an undiscovered masterpiece or anything, but it's considerably more interesting than the average soul-jazz album from the late '60s".

== Track listing ==
All compositions by Sonny Phillips except as noted

1. "Sure 'Nuff, Sure 'Nuff" - 6:50
2. "Be Yourself" - 4:30
3. "Oleo" (Sonny Rollins) - 7:40
4. "Mobile to Chicago" - 7:25
5. "The Other Blues" - 9:10

== Personnel ==
- Sonny Phillips - organ
- Virgil Jones - trumpet (tracks 1, 2 & 4)
- Houston Person - tenor saxophone
- Boogaloo Joe Jones - guitar
- Bob Bushnell - electric bass
- Bernard Purdie - drums
