= Pretty Things (album) =

Studio album by Lou Donaldson
- Released: 1970
- Recorded: January 9 & June 12, 1970
- Genre: Jazz
- Length: 38:02
- Label: Blue Note
- Producer: Francis Wolff

Lou Donaldson chronology
Everything I Play is Funky (1970)	Pretty Things (1970)	The Scorpion (1970)

Professional ratings
Review scores
Source	Rating
Allmusic	2/5 stars

Pretty Things is an album by jazz saxophonist Lou Donaldson recorded for the Blue Note label featuring Donaldson with Blue Mitchell, Leon Spencer, Ted Dunbar, and Idris Muhammad and one track with Lonnie Smith and Melvin Sparks replacing Spencer & Dunbar and Jimmy Lewis added.

== Reception ==
The album was awarded 2 stars in an Allmusic review by Scott Yanow who states "Lou Donaldson has recorded many strong sessions throughout his career but this CD reissue brings back one of the less-significant ones... there are many better Donaldson recordings to acquire first".

== Track listing ==
All compositions by Lou Donaldson except as indicated

1. "Tennessee Waltz" (Pee Wee King, Redd Stewart) – 6:30
2. "Curtis' Song" (Leon Spencer) – 5:45
3. "Sassie Lassie" (Harold Ousley) – 6:25
4. "Just for a Thrill" (Lil Armstrong, Don Raye) – 5:20
5. "Pot Belly" – 8:05
6. "Love" (Milt Gabler, Bert Kaempfert) – 5:57

- Recorded at Rudy Van Gelder Studio, Englewood Cliffs, NJ on January 9, 1970 (track 1) and June 12, 1970 (tracks 2–6).

== Personnel ==
- Lou Donaldson – varitone alto saxophone, vocals
- Blue Mitchell – trumpet
- Lonnie Smith (track 1), Leon Spencer (tracks 2–6) – organ
- Melvin Sparks (track 1), Ted Dunbar (tracks 2–6) – guitar
- Jimmy Lewis – electric bass (track 1)
- Idris Muhammad – drums
