= Leon Spencer =

American jazz organist (1945–2012)

Leon Spencer (November 1, 1945 – March 11, 2012) was an American jazz organist from Houston, Texas. He played piano with David Newman and organ with Melvin Sparks. Spencer recorded for Prestige in the early 1970s with Buddy Caldwell, Idris Muhammad, Melvin Sparks, and Grover Washington Jr.

== Discography ==
=== As leader ===
- Sneak Preview! (Prestige, 1970; reissued as Legends Of Acid Jazz: Leon Spencer, 1997)
- Louisiana Slim (Prestige, 1971; reissued as Legends Of Acid Jazz: Leon Spencer, 1997)
- Bad Walking Woman (Prestige, 1972)
- Where I'm Coming From (Prestige, 1973)

=== As sideman ===
With Lou Donaldson

- Pretty Things (Blue Note, 1970)
- Cosmos (Blue Note, 1971)
- The Scorpion: Live at The Cadillac Club (Blue Note, 1995) – rec. 1970

With Wilbert Longmire

- Revolution (World Pacific, 1969)
- This Side of Heaven (J&M, 1976)

With Melvin Sparks

- Sparks! (Prestige, 1970) – reissued as Legends of Acid Jazz: Melvin Sparks (1996)
- Spark Plug (Prestige, 1971) – reissued as Legends of Acid Jazz: Melvin Sparks (1996)
- Akilah! (Prestige, 1972)

With Sonny Stitt

- Turn It On! (Prestige, 1971) – reissued as Legends of Acid Jazz: Sonny Stitt (1996)
- You Talk That Talk! with Gene Ammons (Prestige, 1971) – reissued as Legends of Acid Jazz: Gene Ammons (1997)
- Black Vibrations (Prestige, 1971) – reissued as Legends of Acid Jazz: Sonny Stitt (1996)

With others

- Rusty Bryant, Fire Eater (Prestige, 1971) – reissued as Legends of Acid Jazz: Rusty Bryant, Vol. 2 (1999)
- Karl Denson, Dance Lesson #2 (Blue Note, 2001)
