= Sneak preview (disambiguation) =

A sneak preview is an unannounced film screening before the formal release of the film.

Sneak Preview may also refer to:

- A former name of American rock band King's X and the name of their then-self-titled debut album
- Sneak Preview!, the debut album by jazz organist Leon Spencer Jr.
- Sneak Preview – Mixes and Remixes, a compilation album from the Sneaky Sound System discography
- Sneak Preview (TV series), a 1956 American anthology television series on NBC
