= Joy Spring (disambiguation) =

"Joy Spring" is a jazz composition by Clifford Brown and is his signature song.

Joy Spring may also refer to:

- Joy Spring (Joe Pass album), 1964
- Joy Spring (Harold Mabern album), 1985
- Joy Spring, 2010 album by Bill Carrothers

== See also ==
- Spring of Joy, a 1993 Swedish film
