= Where I'm Coming From (Leon Spencer album) =

Studio album by Leon Spencer
- Released: 1973
- Recorded: February 22, 1972, and January 26, 1973
- Studio: Van Gelder Studio, Englewood Cliffs
- Genre: Jazz-funk
- Length: 37:35
- Label: Prestige; PR 10063
- Producer: Ozzie Cadena

Leon Spencer chronology
Bad Walking Woman (1972)	Where I'm Coming From (1973)

Where I'm Coming From is the fourth and last album by jazz organist Leon Spencer recorded for the Prestige label in 1973 (with one track recorded in 1972).

== Reception ==
Doug Payne stated the album was "Another good one from Leon Spencer and, regrettably, his recorded swan song as a solo artist".

== Track listing ==
All compositions by Leon Spencer except where noted.

1. "Superstition" (Stevie Wonder) – 6:45
2. "Give Me Your Love" (Curtis Mayfield) – 5:23
3. "Keeper of the Castle" (Brian Potter, Dennis Lambert) – 5:20
4. "Trouble Man" (Marvin Gaye) – 6:45
5. "The Price a Po' Man's Got to Pay" – 5:25
6. "Where I'm Coming From" – 5:35
- Recorded at Van Gelder Studio in Englewood Cliffs, New Jersey on February 22, 1972 (track 6) and January 26, 1973 (tracks 1–5)

== Personnel ==
- Leon Spencer – organ, vocals
- Jon Faddis (tracks 1–4), Victor Paz (tracks 1–4), Virgil Jones (track 6) – trumpet
- Hubert Laws – flute (tracks 6)
- Seldon Powell – flute, tenor saxophone (tracks 1–4)
- Frank Wess – flute, baritone saxophone, conductor (tracks 1–4)
- Sonny Fortune – alto saxophone (track 6)
- Dave Hubbard – tenor saxophone (track 6)
- Joe Beck (tracks 1–5), Melvin Sparks (track 6) – guitar
- Ernie Hayes – electric piano (tracks 1–4)
- George Duvivier – bass (tracks 1–4)
- Grady Tate (tracks 1–5), Idris Muhammad (track 6) – drums
- Buddy Caldwell – congas (track 6)
- Ed Bogas – arranger (tracks 1–4)
- Ozzie Cadena – producer
- Rudy Van Gelder – engineer
