= Greasy Kid Stuff! =

Studio album by Harold Mabern
- Released: 1970
- Recorded: January 26, 1970
- Studio: Van Gelder Studio, Englewood Cliffs, New Jersey
- Genre: Jazz
- Length: 42:20
- Label: Prestige; PR 7764
- Producer: Bob Porter

Harold Mabern chronology
Workin' & Wailin' (1969)	Greasy Kid Stuff! (1970)	Pisces Calling (1978)

Greasy Kid Stuff! is the fourth album led by pianist Harold Mabern which was recorded in 1970 and released on the Prestige label.

== Reception ==
Professional ratings
Review scores
Source	Rating
Allmusic	3/5 stars

Allmusic awarded the album 3 stars, calling it "Excellent advanced hard bop music that hints at fusion".

== Track listing ==
All compositions by Harold Mabern except where noted

1. "Greasy Kid Stuff" - 8:20
2. "I Haven't Got Anything Better to Do" (Lee Pockriss, Paul Vance) - 6:00
3. "XKE" - 6:45
4. "Alex the Great" - 7:15
5. "I Want You Back" (Berry Gordy, Freddie Perren, Alphonzo Mizell, Deke Richards) - 5:35
6. "John Neely-Beautiful People" - 8:25

== Personnel ==
- Harold Mabern - piano, electric piano
- Lee Morgan - trumpet
- Hubert Laws - flute, tenor saxophone
- Joe Jones - guitar (track 5)
- Buster Williams - bass, electric bass
- Idris Muhammad - drums
