= Melvin Sparks =

American jazz guitarist (1946–2011)

- Born: March 22, 1946; Houston, Texas, United States.
- Died: March 15, 2011 (aged 64) Mount Vernon, New York, United States
- Genres: Soul jazz, hard bop, jazz blues
- Occupation: Guitarist
- Instrument: Guitar
- Years active: 1960s–2011
- Labels: Prestige, Savant

Melvin Sparks (March 22, 1946 – March 15, 2011) was an American soul jazz, hard bop and jazz blues guitarist. He recorded a number of albums for Prestige Records, later recording for Savant Records. He appeared on several recordings with musicians including Lou Donaldson, Sonny Stitt, Leon Spencer and Johnny Hammond Smith.

== Career ==
Sparks was born in Houston, Texas, United States, and raised in a musical family. He received his first guitar at age 11. Sparks began working in the rhythm and blues genre as a high school student, first with Hank Ballard and the Midnighters, and then with the Upsetters, a touring band formed by Little Richard, which also backed Jackie Wilson, Curtis Mayfield and Marvin Gaye.

Sparks moved to New York City and worked as a session musician for Blue Note and Prestige Records. As part of the burgeoning soul-jazz scene of the late 1960s and early 1970s, Sparks often backed organists like Jack McDuff, Dr. Lonnie Smith, Charles Earland and Leon Spencer. Sparks released his debut album, Sparks!, for Prestige in 1970.

He was seen on Northeastern television commercials as the voice of Price Chopper's House of BBQ advertising campaign.

Sparks died on March 15, 2011, at age 64, at his home in Mount Vernon, New York. He had diabetes and high blood pressure.

== Discography ==
=== As leader ===
- Sparks! (Prestige, 1970)
- Spark Plug (Prestige, 1971)
- Akilah! (Prestige, 1972)
- Texas Twister (Eastbound, 1973)
- Melvin Sparks '75 (Westbound/20th Century, 1975)
- I'm Funky Now (Westbound/20th Century, 1976)
- Sparkling (Muse, 1982)
- I'm a 'Gittar' Player (Cannonball, 1997)
- What You Hear Is What You Get (Savant, 2003)
- It Is What It Is (Savant, 2004)
- This Is It! (Savant, 2005)
- Groove On Up (Savant, 2006)
- Live at Nectar's (One Note, 2017)

=== As sideman ===
With Henry "Pucho" Brown / Pucho & The Latin Soul Brothers

- Jungle Strut (Lexington/West 47th, 1993)
- Rip A Dip (Milestone, 1995)

With Hank Crawford

- Indigo Blue (Milestone, 1983)
- Down on the Deuce (Milestone, 1984)
- Roadside Symphony (Milestone, 1985)
- Night Beat (Milestone, 1989)
- Groove Master (Milestone, 1990)
- South Central (Milestone, 1992)
- Tight (Milestone, 1996)
- After Dark (Milestone, 1998)
- Crunch Time (Milestone, 1998)
- The World of Hank Crawford (Milestone, 2002)

With Joey DeFrancesco

- All In The Family (HighNote, 1998)
- Plays Sinatra His Way (HighNote, 2004)

With Lou Donaldson

- Hot Dog (Blue Note, 1969)
- Everything I Play Is Funky (Blue Note, 1970)
- Cosmos (Blue Note, 1971)
- The Scorpion (Blue Note, 1995)

With Charles Earland

- Black Talk! (Prestige, 1969)
- Infant Eyes (Muse, 1979)
- Pleasant Afternoon (Muse, 1981)
- Slammin' & Jammin' (Savant, 1998)
- Cookin' with the Mighty Burner (HighNote, 1999)

With Red Holloway

- Keep That Groove Going! (Milestone, 2001)
- Coast to Coast (Milestone, 2003)

With Ron Levy

- Zim Zam Zoom: Acid Blues on B-3 (Bullseye Blues, 1996)
- Voodoo Boogaloo (Levtron, 2005)

With Johnny Lytle

- Good Vibes (Muse, 1982)
- Happy Ground (Muse, 1989)

With Jack McDuff

- Do It Now! (Atlantic, 1966)
- Double Barrelled Soul (Atlantic, 1967)

With Jimmy McGriff

- Countdown (Milestone, 1983)
- State of the Art (Milestone, 1985)
- Blue to the 'Bone (Milestone, 1988)
- Feelin' It (Milestone, 2001)
- McGriff Avenue (Milestone, 2001)

With Idris Muhammad

- Black Rhythm Revolution! (Prestige, 1970)
- Peace and Rhythm (Prestige, 1971)

With Houston Person

- The Nearness of You (Muse, 1977)
- Suspicions (Muse, 1980)
- Heavy Juice (Muse, 1982)
- We Owe It All To Love (Baseline [UK], 1989)
- Christmas with Houston Person and Friends (Muse, 1994)

With Sonny Phillips

- Black Magic (Prestige, 1970)
- Black on Black! (Prestige, 1970)

With Dr. Lonnie Smith

- Think! (Blue Note, 1968)
- Turning Point (Blue Note, 1969)

With Leon Spencer

- Sneak Preview! (Prestige, 1970)
- Louisiana Slim (Prestige, 1971)
- Bad Walking Woman (Prestige, 1972)
- Where I'm Coming From (Prestige, 1973)

With Sonny Stitt

- Turn It On! (Prestige, 1971)
- Black Vibrations (Prestige, 1971)

With Reuben Wilson

- Blue Mode (Blue Note, 1969)
- The Cisco Kid (Groove Merchant, 1973)
- Down with It (Cannonball, 1998)
- Fun House (Savant, 2005)

With others

- Rusty Bryant, Soul Liberation (Prestige, 1970)
- Dennis Day, All Things in Time (D-Day Media, 2008)
- Papa John DeFrancesco, Hip Cake Walk (HighNote, 2001)
- Karl Denson, Dance Lesson #2 (Blue Note, 2001)
- Ceasar Frazier, Hail Ceasar! (Eastbound, 1972)
- Etta Jones, If You Could See Me Now (Muse, 1978)
- Charles Kynard, Wa-Tu-Wa-Zui (Beautiful People) (Prestige, 1970)
- John Patton, Soul Connection (Nilva, 1983)
- Bernard Purdie, Bernard Purdie's Jazz Groove Sessions In Tokyo (Lexington/West 47th, 1993)
- Alvin Queen, Lenox and Seventh (Black & Blue, 1985)
- Rhoda Scott, Very Saxy: Live Au Meridien (Ahead, 2005) -with Ricky Ford, Houston Person
- Johnny "Hammond" Smith, Wild Horses Rock Steady (Kudu/CTI, 1971)
- Dakota Staton, A Packet of Love Letters (HighNote, 1996)
- Tom "T Bone" Stinson, On Fire (Golden Zebra, 2004)
- Leon Thomas, Leon Thomas Blues Band (Portrait/Epic, 1988)
- Jimmy Witherspoon, The Blues Is Now (Verve, 1967)

== See also ==
- Jazz funk
