= Friday Night Funk for Saturday Night Brothers =

Studio album by Rusty Bryant
- Released: 1972
- Recorded: July 17, 1972
- Studio: Van Gelder Studio, Englewood Cliffs, NJ
- Genre: Jazz
- Length: 35:08
- Label: Prestige; PR 10053
- Producer: Ozzie Cadena

Rusty Bryant chronology
Wild Fire (1971)	Friday Night Funk for Saturday Night Brothers (1972)	For the Good Times (1973)

Friday Night Funk for Saturday Night Brothers is an album by jazz saxophonist Rusty Bryant recorded for the Prestige label in 1972.

== Reception ==
Professional ratings
Review scores
Source	Rating
Allmusic	4/5 stars

The Allmusic site awarded the album 4 stars.

== Track listing ==
1. "Friday Night Funk for Saturday Night Brothers" (Kenneth Moss) - 6:35
2. "Down By the Cuyahoga" (Fred Masey) - 8:35
3. "Have You Seen Her" (Barbara Acklin, Eugene Record) - 5:30
4. "Mercy, Mercy, Mercy" (Joe Zawinul) - 7:00
5. "Blues for a Brother" (Rusty Bryant) - 8:05

== Personnel ==
- Rusty Bryant - alto saxophone, tenor saxophone
- Kenneth Moss - electric piano, organ
- Harold Young - guitar
- Eddie Brookshine - electric bass
- Fred Masey - drums
- Norman Jones - congas, percussion

=== Production ===
- Ozzie Cadena - producer
- Rudy Van Gelder - engineer
