= Cosmos (Lou Donaldson album) =

Studio album by Lou Donaldson
- Released: 1971
- Recorded: July 16, 1971
- Studio: Van Gelder Studio, Englewood Cliffs, NJ
- Genre: Jazz
- Length: 39:16
- Label: Blue Note
- Producer: George Butler

Lou Donaldson chronology
The Scorpion (1970)	Cosmos (1971)	Sophisticated Lou (1972)

Professional ratings
Review scores
Source	Rating
Allmusic	1/5 stars

Cosmos is an album by the jazz saxophonist Lou Donaldson recorded for the Blue Note label, featuring Donaldson with Ed Williams, Leon Spencer, Melvin Sparks, Jerry Jemmott, Idris Muhammad and Ray Armando, with vocals by Mildred Brown, Rosalyn Brown and Naomi Thomas, arranged by Jimmy Briggs.

== Reception ==
The album was awarded 1 star in an Allmusic review.

== Track listing ==
All compositions by Lou Donaldson except where noted

1. "The Caterpillar" – 6:50
2. "Make It with You" (David Gates) – 4:57
3. "If There's Hell Below (We're All Going To Go)" (Curtis Mayfield) – 9:03
4. "Caracas" – 8:24
5. "I'll Be There" (Berry Gordy, Bob West, Hal Davis, Willie Hutch) – 5:24
6. "When You're Smiling" (Joe Goodwin, Larry Shay, Mark Fisher) – 5:18
  - Recorded at Rudy Van Gelder Studio, Englewood Cliffs, NJ on July 16, 1971.

== Personnel ==
- Lou Donaldson – varitone alto saxophone
- Ed Williams – trumpet
- Leon Spencer – organ
- Melvin Sparks – guitar
- Jerry Jemmott – electric bass
- Idris Muhammad – drums
- Ray Armando – congas
- Mildred Brown, Rosalyn Brown, Naomi Thomas – vocals arranged by Jimmy Briggs
