= Buck Jumpin' =

Studio album by Al Casey
- Released: 1960
- Recorded: March 7, 1960
- Studio: Van Gelder Studio, Englewood Cliffs, NJ
- Genre: Jazz
- Length: 47:53 CD reissue with additional tracks
- Label: Swingville; SVLP 2007
- Producer: The Sound of America

Al Casey chronology
Buck Jumpin' (1960)	The Al Casey Quartet (1960)

Buck Jumpin' is an album by guitarist Al Casey which was recorded in 1960 and released on the Swingville label.

== Reception ==
Professional ratings
Review scores
Source	Rating
AllMusic	4/5 stars

Scott Yanow of AllMusic states, "Al Casey, who will always be best known as Fats Waller's guitarist, makes one of his few appearances as a bandleader ... The music consistently swings and it is a rare pleasure to hear Casey getting the opportunity to stretch out on acoustic guitar".

== Track listing ==
All compositions by Al Casey except where noted

1. "Buck Jumpin'" – 6:11
2. "Casey's Blues" – 6:38
3. "Don't Blame Me" (Jimmy McHugh, Dorothy Fields) – 5:45
4. "Rosetta" (Earl Hines, Henri Woode) – 5:45
5. "Ain't Misbehavin'" (Fats Waller, Andy Razaf, Harry Brooks) – 4:42
6. "Honeysuckle Rose" (Waller, Razaf) – 5:32
7. "Body and Soul" (Johnny Green, Frank Eyton, Edward Heyman, Robert Sour) – 5:16
8. "Gut Soul" – 3:04 Additional track on CD reissue
9. "I'm Gonna Sit Right Down and Write Myself a Letter" (Fred E. Ahlert, Joe Young) – 5:00 Additional track on CD reissue

== Personnel ==
- Al Casey – guitar
- Rudy Powell – alto saxophone, clarinet
- Herman Foster – piano
- Jimmy Lewis – bass
- Belton Evans – drums
