= Snake Rhythm Rock =

Studio album by Ivan "Boogaloo Joe" Jones
- Released: 1973
- Recorded: November 24, 1972
- Studio: Van Gelder Studio, Englewood Cliffs, New Jersey
- Genre: Jazz
- Length: 32:28
- Label: Prestige; PR 10056
- Producer: Ozzie Cadena

Ivan "Boogaloo Joe" Jones chronology
What It Is (1971)	Snake Rhythm Rock (1973)	Black Whip (1973)

Snake Rhythm Rock is the seventh album by guitarist Ivan "Boogaloo Joe" Jones which was recorded in 1972 and released on the Prestige label.

== Track listing ==
All compositions by Ivan "Boogaloo Joe" Jones except where noted

1. "Hoochie Coo Chickie" - 5:26
2. "Snake Rhythm Rock" - 5:34
3. "The First Time Ever I Saw Your Face" (Ewan MacColl) - 5:55
4. "He's So Fine" (Ronald Mack) - 6:33
5. "Big Bad Midnight Roller" - 9:00

== Personnel ==
- Ivan "Boogaloo Joe" Jones - guitar
- Rusty Bryant - alto saxophone, tenor saxophone
- Butch Cornell - organ
- Jimmy Lewis - electric bass
- Grady Tate - drums
