= Soul Night/Live! =

Live album by Willis Jackson
- Released: 1966
- Recorded: March 21, 1964; The Allegro, New York City
- Genre: Jazz
- Label: Prestige; PRLP 7396

Willis Jackson chronology
Live! Action (1964)	Soul Night/Live! (1966)	Tell It... (1964)

Soul Night/Live! is a live album by saxophonist Willis Jackson, recorded in New York City in 1964 and released on the Prestige label in 1966. This was the third album to be released from the same performance following Live! Action and Jackson's Action! with a fourth later release Tell It... appearing in 1967.

== Reception ==
Professional ratings
Review scores
Source	Rating
AllMusic	4/5 stars
The Penguin Guide to Jazz Recordings	3/4 stars
The Rolling Stone Jazz Record Guide	3/5 stars

AllMusic awarded the album 4 stars.

== Track listing ==
All compositions by Willis Jackson except as indicated

1. "The Man I Love" (George Gershwin, Ira Gershwin) - 5:40
2. "Perdido" (Juan Tizol) - 9:00
3. "Thunderbird" - 5:10
4. "Polka Dots and Moonbeams" (Jimmy Van Heusen, Johnny Burke) - 5:50
5. "All Soul" (Curtis Lewis) - 5:00
6. "Flamingo" (Ted Grouya, Edmund Anderson) - 5:40
- Recorded at The Allegro in New York City on March 21, 1964

== Personnel ==
- Willis Jackson - tenor saxophone
- Frank Robinson - trumpet
- Carl Wilson - organ
- Pat Martino - guitar
- Joe Hadrick - drums
