= Black on Black! =

Studio album by Sonny Phillips
- Released: 1970
- Recorded: July 27, 1970
- Studio: Van Gelder Studio, Englewood Cliffs, New Jersey
- Genre: Jazz
- Label: Prestige; PR 10007
- Producer: Bob Porter

Sonny Phillips chronology
Black Magic (1970)	Black on Black! (1970)	My Black Flower (1976)

Black on Black! is the third album by jazz organist Sonny Phillips, which was recorded in 1970 and released on the Prestige label.

== Reception ==
Professional ratings
Review scores
Source	Rating
Allmusic	4.5/5 stars

Stewart Mason of Allmusic stated, "Sonny Phillips' third and final album for Prestige, coming just over a year after his first, shows the soul-jazz organist moving in a somewhat funkier direction than his first two efforts. The roiling title track actually has an edge of menace to it, an idea his other albums never even entertained".

== Track listing ==
All compositions by Sonny Phillips except where noted.

1. "Black on Black" (Rusty Bryant, Sonny Phillips, Melvin Sparks, Jimmy Lewis, Bernard Purdie) – 5:30
2. "Check It Out" (Sonny Phillips) – 6:16
3. "Blues in Maude's Flat" (Grant Green) – 6:25
4. "Proud Mary" (John Fogerty) – 7:55
5. "The Doll House" (Jimmy Lewis) – 7:32

== Personnel ==
- Sonny Phillips – organ
- Rusty Bryant – alto saxophone, tenor saxophone
- Melvin Sparks – guitar
- Jimmy Lewis – electric bass
- Bernard Purdie – drums
