= Bad Walking Woman =

Studio album by Leon Spencer
- Released: 1972
- Recorded: February 22, 1972
- Studio: Van Gelder Studio, Englewood Cliffs
- Genre: Jazz
- Length: 37:35
- Label: Prestige; PR 10042
- Producer: Ozzie Cadena

Leon Spencer chronology
Louisiana Slim (1971)	Bad Walking Woman (1972)	Where I'm Coming From (1973)

Bad Walking Woman is the third album by jazz organist Leon Spencer recorded for the Prestige label in 1972.

== Reception ==
Doug Payne stated the album was "Supremely heavy work from organist Leon Spencer – one of his classic jazz funk sessions for Prestige Records, and a record that shows him opening up his sound a bit more than before!".

== Track listing ==
All compositions by Leon Spencer.

1. "Hip Shaker" – 3:50 [actual time = 3:00]
2. "Down On Dowling Street" – 4:55
3. "In Search of Love" – 4:00
4. "If You Were Me and I Were You" – 5:57
5. "Bad Walking Woman" – 5:01
6. "When My Love Has Gone" – 6:10
7. "When Dreams Start to Fade" – 7:42

== Personnel ==
- Leon Spencer – organ, vocals
- Virgil Jones – trumpet (track 5)
- Hubert Laws – flute, piccolo flute (tracks 3, 4, 6 & 7)
- Buzz Brauer – flute, English horn, oboe (tracks 3, 4, 6 & 7)
- Sonny Fortune – alto saxophone (track 5)
- Dave Hubbard – tenor saxophone (tracks 1 & 5)
- Melvin Sparks (tracks 1, 2, 4 & 5), Joe Beck (tracks 3, 6 & 7) – guitar
- Idris Muhammad – drums
- Buddy Caldwell – congas (tracks 4, 5 & 6)
- Billy Ver Planck – arranger (tracks 3, 4, 6 & 7)
- Unidentified string section – (tracks 3, 4, 6 & 7)

=== Production ===
- Ozzie Cadena – producer
- Rudy Van Gelder – engineer
