= Live! Action =

Live album by Willis Jackson
- Released: 1966
- Recorded: March 21, 1964; The Allegro, New York City
- Genre: Jazz
- Label: Prestige; PR 7380

Willis Jackson chronology
Jackson's Action! (1964)	Live! Action (1966)	Soul Night/Live! (1964)

Live! Action is a live album by saxophonist Willis Jackson which was recorded in New York City in 1964 and released on the Prestige label in 1966. Three additional albums were released from the same performance Jackson's Action!, Tell It..., and Soul Night/Live!.

== Reception ==
Professional ratings
Review scores
Source	Rating
Allmusic	3/5 stars
The Rolling Stone Jazz Record Guide	3/5 stars

Allmusic awarded the album 3 stars.

== Track listing ==
All compositions by Willis Jackson except as indicated

1. "Hello Dolly!" (Jerry Herman) - 2:25
2. "Annie Laurie" - 2:28
3. "Blowin' Like Hell" - 5:55
4. "Blue Gator" - 3:45
5. "I'm A Fool to Want You" (Joel Herron, Frank Sinatra, Jack Wolf) - 3:26
6. "Gator Tail" - 9:55
7. "Satin Doll" (Duke Ellington, Billy Strayhorn, Johnny Mercer) - 9:52
- Recorded at The Allegro in New York City on March 21, 1964

== Personnel ==
- Willis Jackson - tenor saxophone
- Frank Robinson - trumpet
- Carl Wilson - organ
- Pat Martino - guitar
- Joe Hadrick - drums
