= Fire Eater (album) =

Studio album by Rusty Bryant
- Released: 1971
- Recorded: February 22, 1971
- Studio: Van Gelder Studio, Englewood Cliffs, NJ
- Genre: Jazz
- Length: 35:08
- Label: Prestige; PR 10014
- Producer: Bob Porter

Rusty Bryant chronology
Soul Liberation (1970)	Fire Eater (1971)	Wild Fire (1971)

Fire Eater is an album by jazz saxophonist Rusty Bryant recorded for the Prestige label in 1971.

== Reception ==
Professional ratings
Review scores
Source	Rating
Allmusic	4.5/5 stars

The Allmusic site awarded the album 4½ stars calling it "a session that has Bryant stretching out his meaty tone and improvisations a bit further than usual. This is respectable soul-jazz with a lot of funk, but no fusion, employing the tenor sax-organ-guitar-drums lineup".

== Track listing ==
1. "Fire Eater" (Rusty Bryant, Jeremy Taylor) - 9:30
2. "Free at Last" (Bryant, Wilbert Longmire) - 8:35
3. "The Hooker" (Leon Spencer) - 9:25
4. "Mister S." (Spencer) - 7:38

== Personnel ==
- Rusty Bryant - tenor saxophone
- Bill Mason (tracks 1 & 2), Leon Spencer (tracks 3 & 4) - organ
- Wilbert Longmire - guitar
- Idris Muhammad - drums

=== Production ===
- Bob Porter - producer
- Rudy Van Gelder - engineer
