= Idris Muhammad =

American jazz drummer and bandleader (1939–2014)

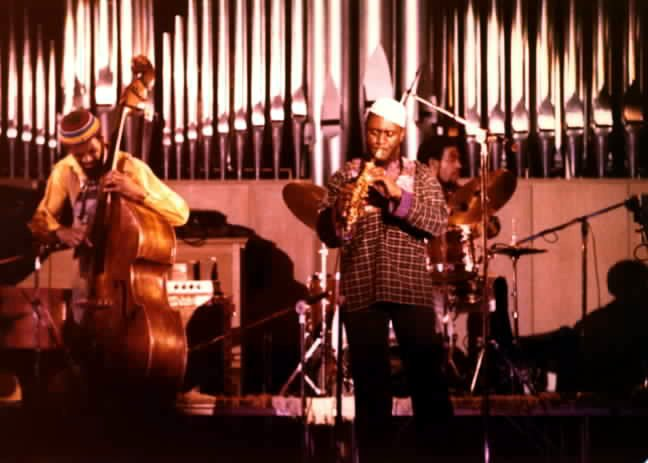
- Muhammad playing with Reggie Workman and Pharoah Sanders, c. 1978

Background information
- Born: Leo Morris; November 13, 1939; New Orleans, Louisiana, U.S.
- Died: July 29, 2014 (aged 74) Fort Lauderdale, Florida, U.S.
- Genres: Jazz; funk; R&B
- Occupation: Musician
- Instrument: Drums

Idris Muhammad (Arabic: إدريس محمد; born Leo Morris; November 13, 1939 – July 29, 2014) was an American jazz drummer and bandleader. He had an extensive career performing jazz, funk, R&B, and soul music and recorded with musicians such as Ahmad Jamal, Lou Donaldson, Pharoah Sanders, Bob James, and Tete Montoliu.

== Biography ==
Born in New Orleans, Idris Muhammad grew up in the city's 13th Ward in a home next door to a dry cleaner's shop. He later would claim the sound of the shop's steam presser influenced his hi-hat technique.

Growing up, he spent time with fellow New Orleanians The Neville Brothers. Also interested in other instruments, he showed early talent as a percussionist, playing in a Mardi Gras parade at age 9.

Muhammad asked Paul Barbarin to teach him to read music but Barbarin, who thought he was already so talented, declined.

At the age of 14, Muhammad began his professional career by performing with The Hawketts on their iconic recording "Mardi Gras Mambo". Two years later, in 1956, he played drums on Fats Domino's recording of "Blueberry Hill".

After being introduced by Joe Jones, Muhammad began touring with Sam Cooke. Later he played with Jerry Butler and Curtis Mayfield in Chicago, working largely in R'n'B, before moving to New York City in the mid-1960s. In New York, Muhammad became embedded in the jazz scene playing with Kenny Dorham, Horace Silver, Lou Donaldson and Betty Carter. He also played in the Apollo Theatre's house band. In 1967, he accepted a job in the orchestra for the initial off-Broadway production of Hair and stayed with the production when it moved to Broadway.

During this time, Muhammad was also in the Prestige label's house band and made more than 150 recordings for the Prestige, Blue Note, and CTI labels, among others. He recorded with artists such as Lou Donaldson and Charles Earland who had begun merging jazz with sounds from funk, soul and rock. Muhammad also appeared as a sideman with artists such as Gene Ammons, Nat Adderley, and George Benson. Rudy Van Gelder often worked with Muhammad and had a special relationship with him. The recording engineer greatly assisted with fine tuning Muhammad's recorded drum sound.

After four years with Hair, Muhammad left the production to tour with Roberta Flack whom he worked with for much of the next decade.

Muhammad's first recording as a leader, Black Rhythm Revolution!, was released by Prestige in 1970 and was followed by Peace and Rhythm in 1971. Both of these albums explored a range of styles and traditions found in jazz and New Orleans rhythms. Subsequent albums released on the Kudu imprint, Power of Soul, House of the Rising Sun, and Turn This Mutha Out, took a turn towards funk. These albums have subsequently become favourites of funk enthusiasts and have been heavily sampled by hip-hop artists.

Towards the end of the 1970s, Muhammad joined Johnny Griffin's band and also spent time playing with Pharoah Sanders.

By the 1980s, Muhammad had moved to Europe. He continued to regularly play and record, collaborating with the likes of Ahmad Jamal, Chico Freeman and Sonny Rollins.

In 2011 he moved back to New Orleans. He died of kidney failure in 2014, aged 74, and was buried according to Islamic burial traditions in Fort Lauderdale, Florida.

== Personal life ==
He changed his name to Idris Muhammad in the 1960s upon his conversion to Islam. Speaking on his name change, he later noted in an interview with Modern Drummer magazine, "One guy told me that if I changed my name, I was going to have a problem because no one would know that Leo Morris and Idris Muhammad were the same guy...But I thought, well, if I stay the same person, then people will know it's me. And it worked like that. Everybody knew right away that it was me, because of my style of playing."

In 1966, he married singer Dolores "LaLa" Brooks, a former member of the Crystals. She converted to Islam with him and went for a time by the name Sakinah Muhammad. They separated in 1999. Together, they had two sons and two daughters; he also had a daughter from his first marriage to Gracie Lee Edwards. One son, also named Idris Muhammed, is a professional chef who has appeared on several cooking competition shows including Beat Bobby Flay and Chopped.

Muhammad endorsed Istanbul Agop Cymbals.

== Discography ==
=== As leader ===
- Black Rhythm Revolution! (1970)
- Peace and Rhythm (1971)
- Power of Soul (1974)
- House of the Rising Sun (1976)
- Turn This Mutha Out (1977)
- Boogie to the Top (1978)
- You Ain't No Friend of Mine (1978)
- Foxhuntin' (1979)
- Make It Count (1980)
- Kabsha (1980)
- My Turn (1992)
- Right Now (1998)

=== As sideman ===
With Nat Adderley

- Calling Out Loud (CTI, 1968)

With Eric Alexander

- Solid! (Milestone, 1998)

With Gene Ammons

- The Black Cat! (Prestige, 1970)
- You Talk That Talk! (Prestige, 1971)
- My Way (Prestige, 1971)
- Got My Own (Prestige, 1972)
- Big Bad Jug (Prestige, 1972)

With George Benson

- Goodies (Verve, 1968)
- Tell It Like It Is (A&M, 1969)
- The Other Side of Abbey Road (A&M, 1969)

With Walter Bishop, Jr.

- Bish Bash (Xanadu, 1968 [1975])
- Coral Keys (Black Jazz, 1971)

With Bobby Broom

- Modern Man (Delmark, 2001)

With Rusty Bryant

- Soul Liberation (Prestige, 1970)
- Fire Eater (Prestige, 1971)
- Wild Fire (Prestige, 1971)

With Donald Byrd

- Fancy Free (Blue Note, 1969)

With George Coleman

- Manhattan Panorama (Theresa, 1985)

With Hank Crawford

- Help Me Make it Through the Night (Kudu, 1972)
- Wildflower (Kudu, 1973)
- I Hear a Symphony (Kudu, 1975)
- Tight (Milestone, 1996)

With Art Davis

- Life (Soul Note, 1986)

With Paul Desmond

- Summertime (A&M/CTI, 1968)

With Fats Domino

- Blueberry Hill (1965)

With Lou Donaldson

- Fried Buzzard (Cadet, 1965)
- Blowing in the Wind (Cadet, 1966)
- Alligator Bogaloo (Blue Note, 1967)
- Mr. Shing-A-Ling (Blue Note, 1967)
- Midnight Creeper (Blue Note, 1968)
- Say It Loud! (Blue Note, 1968)
- Hot Dog (Blue Note, 1969)
- Everything I Play is Funky (Blue Note, 1970)
- Pretty Things (Blue Note, 1970)
- The Scorpion (Blue Note, 1970)
- Cosmos (Blue Note, 1971)
- Sweet Poppa Lou (Muse, 1981)

With Charles Earland

- Black Talk! (Prestige, 1969)

With Grant Green

- Carryin' On (Blue Note, 1969)
- Green Is Beautiful (Blue Note, 1970)
- Alive! (Blue Note, 1970)
- Live at Club Mozambique (Blue Note 2006, recorded 1971)

With Johnny Griffin

- NYC Underground (Galaxy, 1979 [1981])
- To the Ladies (Galaxy, 1979 [1982])

With Roy Hargrove

- Habana (Verve, 1997)

With Benjamin Herman

- Get In (1999)

With John Hicks

- Some Other Time (Theresa, 1981)
- In Concert (Theresa, 1984 [1986])
- Inc. 1 (DIW, 1985)
- I'll Give You Something to Remember Me By (Limetree, 1987)
- Is That So? (Timeless, 1991)

With Andrew Hill

- Grass Roots (Blue Note, 1968)

With Richard "Groove" Holmes

- Shippin' Out (Muse, 1978)

With Freddie Hubbard

- New Colors (Hip Bop Essence, 2001)

With Bobbi Humphrey

- Flute-In (Blue Note, 1971)

With Willis Jackson

- Bar Wars (Muse, 1977)

With Ahmad Jamal

- The Essence Part One (Birdology, 1995)
- Big Byrd: The Essence Part 2 (Birdology, 1995)
- Nature: The Essence Part Three (Birdology, 1997)
- Picture Perfect (Birdology, 2000)
- Ahmad Jamal 70th Birthday/Olympia 2000 (Dreyfus, 2000)
- In Search of Momentum (Dreyfus, 2002)
- After Fajr (Dreyfus, 2005)
- It's Magic (Dreyfus, 2008)

With Bob James

- One (CTI, 1974)
- Touchdown (Tappan Zee, 1978)

With J. J. Johnson and Kai Winding

- Betwixt & Between (A&M/CTI, 1969)

With Etta Jones

- My Mother's Eyes (Muse, 1977)
- If You Could See Me Now (Muse, 1978)

With Rodney Jones

- Soul Manifesto (1991)

With Keystone Trio

- Heart Beats (1995)
- Newklear Music (1997)

With Charles Kynard

- Wa-Tu-Wa-Zui (Beautiful People) (Prestige, 1970)

With Joe Lovano

- Friendly Fire (Blue Note, 1998)
- Flights of Fancy: Trio Fascination Edition Two (Blue Note, 2000)

With Johnny Lytle

- Fast Hands (Muse, 1980)
- Good Vibes (Muse, 1982)

With Harold Mabern

- Workin' & Wailin' (Prestige, 1969)
- Greasy Kid Stuff! (Prestige, 1970)

With Roberto Magris

- Mating Call (JMood Records, 2010)

With Jimmy McGriff

- City Lights (JAM, 1981)

With Tete Montoliu

- Catalonian Rhapsody (Alfa, 1992)

With Tisziji Munoz

- Visiting This Planet (Anami Music
- Hearing Voices (Anami Music)

With David "Fathead" Newman

- Concrete Jungle (Prestige, 1978)
- Keep the Dream Alive (Prestige, 1978)

With Don Patterson

- Why Not... (Muse, 1978)

With Houston Person

- Person to Person! (Prestige, 1970)
- The Real Thing (Eastbound, 1973)
- Wild Flower (Muse, 1977)

With Ernest Ranglin

- Below the Bassline (Island, 1998)

With Roots

- Stablemates (In+Out, 1993)

With Pharoah Sanders

- Jewels of Thought (Impulse!, 1969)
- Journey to the One (Theresa, 1980)
- Pharoah Sanders Live... (Theresa, 1982)
- Heart is a Melody (Theresa, 1982)
- Shukuru (Theresa, 1985)
- Africa (Timeless, 1987)

With Horace Silver

- That Healin' Feelin' (Blue Note, 1970)

With John Scofield

- Groove Elation (Blue Note, 1995)

With Shirley Scott

- Lean on Me (Cadet, 1972)

With Lonnie Smith

- Turning Point (Blue Note, 1969)

With Melvin Sparks

- Sparks! (Prestige, 1970)
- Spark Plug (Prestige, 1971)
- Akilah! (Prestige, 1972)

With Leon Spencer

- Sneak Preview! (Prestige, 1970)
- Louisiana Slim (Prestige, 1971)
- Bad Walking Woman (Prestige, 1972)
- Where I'm Coming From (Prestige, 1972)

With Bob Stewart

- First Line (JMT, 1988)

With Sonny Stitt

- Turn It On! (Prestige, 1971)
- Black Vibrations (Prestige, 1971)
- Goin' Down Slow (Prestige, 1972)

With Gábor Szabó

- Macho (Salvation, 1975)

With Stanley Turrentine

- Common Touch (Blue Note, 1968)
- Don't Mess with Mister T. (CTI, BGO Records, Sony 1973)
- The Sugar Man (CTI, BGO Records, Sony 1975)
- The Man with the Sad Face (Fantasy, 1976)

With Randy Weston

- Portraits of Duke Ellington (Verve, 1989)
- Portraits of Thelonious Monk (Verve, 1989)
- Self Portraits (Verve, 1989)
- Spirits of Our Ancestors (Verve, 1991)

With Reuben Wilson

- Love Bug (Blue Note, 1969)
- Grover Washington Jr.. (Motown, 1980)
- Skylarkin

=== Sampled ===
- Beastie Boys, Paul's Boutique, "To All the Girls" (Capitol, 1989)
- The song "Could Heaven Ever Be Like This" by Idris Muhammad has been sampled by artists including Jamie XX and Chrome Sparks, and in the song "Blow Up" by Ta-Ku.Rise by Soul Providers (Bini+Martini vocal mix 2000)
