= Night Train Now! =

Studio album by Rusty Bryant
- Released: 1969
- Recorded: October 6, 1969
- Studio: Van Gelder Studio, Englewood Cliffs, NJ
- Genre: Jazz
- Length: 32:52
- Label: Prestige; PR 7735
- Producer: Bob Porter

Rusty Bryant chronology
Rusty Bryant Returns (1969)	Night Train Now! (1969)	Soul Liberation (1970)

Night Train Now! is an album by jazz saxophonist Rusty Bryant recorded for the Prestige label in 1969.

== Reception ==
Professional ratings
Review scores
Source	Rating
Allmusic	3.5/5 stars

The Allmusic site awarded the album 3½ stars calling it "An effort very much consistent with producer Bob Porter's Prestige "house" soul-jazz sound, utilizing players who would contribute to many other similar efforts in the late '60s and early '70s".

== Track listing ==
All compositions by Rusty Bryant except as noted

1. "Cootie Boogaloo" - 5:52
2. "Funky Mama" - 5:50
3. "Funky Rabbits" - 5:35
4. "Night Train" (Jimmy Forrest) - 5:20
5. "With These Hands" - 4:22
6. "Home Fries" - 5:53

== Personnel ==
- Rusty Bryant - alto saxophone, tenor saxophone, varitone
- Jimmy Carter - organ
- Boogaloo Joe Jones - guitar
- Eddie Mathias - electric bass
- Bernard Purdie - drums

=== Production ===
- Bob Porter - producer
- Rudy Van Gelder - engineer
