= My Fire! =

Studio album by Joe Jones
- Released: 1968
- Recorded: October 21, 1968
- Studio: Van Gelder Studio, Englewood Cliffs, New Jersey
- Genre: Jazz
- Length: 33:26
- Label: Prestige; PR 7613
- Producer: Bob Porter

Joe Jones chronology
Introducing the Psychedelic Soul Jazz Guitar of Joe Jones (1967)	My Fire! (1968)	Boogaloo Joe (1969)

My Fire! (subtitled More of the Psychedelic Soul Jazz Guitar of Joe Jones) is the second album by guitarist Joe Jones which was recorded in 1968 and released on the Prestige label.

== Track listing ==
All compositions by Joe Jones except noted

1. "Light My Fire" (Jim Morrison, Robby Krieger, Ray Manzarek, John Densmore) - 3:54
2. "For Big Hal (Harold Mabern) - 7:04
3. "St. James Infirmary" (Traditional) - 5:23
4. "Take All" (Lloyd Price) - 3:50
5. "Time After Time" (Jule Styne, Sammy Cahn) - 7:19
6. "Ivan the Terrible" - 5:56

== Personnel ==
- Joe Jones - guitar
- Harold Mabern - piano
- Peck Morrison - bass
- Bill English - drums
- Richie "Pablo" Landrum - congas
