= No Way! =

Studio album by Boogaloo Joe Jones
- Released: 1971
- Recorded: November 23, 1970
- Studio: Van Gelder Studio, Englewood Cliffs, New Jersey
- Genre: Jazz
- Length: 35:59
- Label: Prestige; PR 10004
- Producer: Bob Porter

Boogaloo Joe Jones chronology
Right On Brother (1970)	No Way! (1971)	What It Is (1971)

No Way! is the fifth album by guitarist Boogaloo Joe Jones which was recorded in 1970 and released on the Prestige label.

== Reception ==
Professional ratings
Review scores
Source	Rating
Allmusic	3/5 stars

Allmusic awarded the album 3 stars calling it "a set of pretty funky early-'70s soul-jazz".

== Track listing ==
All compositions by Boogaloo Joe Jones except where noted

1. "No Way" - 7:16
2. "If You Were Mine" (Jimmy Lewis) - 4:48
3. "Georgia On My Mind" (Hoagy Carmichael, Stuart Gorrell) - 5:59
4. "Sunshine Alley" (Butch Cornell) - 7:09
5. "I'll Be There" (Berry Gordy, Bob West, Willie Hutch, Hal Davis) - 4:02
6. "Holdin' Back" - 6:45

== Personnel ==
- Boogaloo Joe Jones - guitar
- Grover Washington Jr. - tenor saxophone
- Sonny Phillips - organ, electric piano (tracks 1,2,3 & 5)
- Butch Cornell - organ (tracks 4 & 6)
- Jimmy Lewis - electric bass
- Bernard Purdie - drums
