= What It Is (Boogaloo Joe Jones album) =

Studio album by Boogaloo Joe Jones
- Released: 1971
- Recorded: August 16, 1971
- Studio: Van Gelder Studio, Englewood Cliffs, New Jersey
- Genre: Jazz
- Length: 37:40
- Label: Prestige; PR 10035
- Producer: Bob Porter

Boogaloo Joe Jones chronology
No Way! (1970)	What It Is (1971)	Snake Rhythm Rock (1972)

What It Is is the sixth album by guitarist Boogaloo Joe Jones which was recorded in 1971 and released on the Prestige label.

== Reception ==
Professional ratings
Review scores
Source	Rating
Allmusic	3/5 stars

Allmusic awarded the album 3 stars stating "Jones has his cult following, but as soul-jazz goes, this is kind of run of the mill: good for background, but not captivating foreground listening".

== Track listing ==
All compositions by Joe Jones except where noted

1. "Ain't No Sunshine" (Bill Withers) - 5:30
2. "I Feel the Earth Move" (Carole King) - 6:10
3. "Fadin'" - 7:00
4. "What It Is" - 7:00
5. "Let Them Talk" (Sonny Thompson) - 5:45
6. "Inside Job" - 6:15

== Personnel ==
- Boogaloo Joe Jones - guitar
- Grover Washington Jr. - tenor saxophone
- Butch Cornell - organ
- Jimmy Lewis - electric bass
- Bernard Purdie - drums
- Buddy Caldwell - congas, bongos
