= The Al Casey Quartet =

Studio album by Al Casey
- Released: 1960
- Recorded: November 10, 1960
- Studio: Van Gelder Studio, Englewood Cliffs, NJ
- Genre: Jazz
- Length: 36:41
- Label: Moodsville; MVLP 12

Al Casey chronology
Buck Jumpin' (1960)	The Al Casey Quartet (1960)	Jumpin' with Al (1974)

The Al Casey Quartet is an album by guitarist Al Casey which was recorded in 1960 and released on the Moodsville label.

Professional ratings
Review scores
Source	Rating
AllMusic	3/5 stars

== Track listing ==
1. "Blue Moon" (Richard Rodgers, Lorenz Hart) – 4:35
2. "These Foolish Things" (Jack Strachey, Eric Maschwitz) – 6:45
3. "All Alone" (Irving Berlin) – 5:26
4. "Don't Worry About Me" (Rube Bloom, Ted Koehler) – 5:52
5. "Dancing in the Dark" (Arthur Schwartz, Howard Dietz) – 4:23
6. "I'm Beginning to See the Light" (Duke Ellington, Don George, Johnny Hodges, Harry James) – 4:47
7. "A Case of the Blues" (Jim Lewis) – 2:53

== Personnel ==
- Al Casey – guitar
- Lee Anderson – piano
- Jimmy Lewis – bass
- Belton Evans – drums
