= Akilah! =

Studio album by Melvin Sparks
- Released: 1972
- Recorded: February 14 & 21, 1972
- Studios: Van Gelder Studio, Englewood Cliffs
- Genre: Jazz
- Labels: Prestige; PR 10039
- Producer: Ozzie Cadena

Melvin Sparks chronology
Spark Plug (1971)	Akilah! (1972)	Texas Twister (1973)

Akilah! is the third album by soul jazz guitarist Melvin Sparks recorded for the Prestige label in 1972.

== Reception ==
Professional ratings
Review scores
Source	Rating
Allmusic	3/5 stars

Allmusic awarded the album 3 stars.

== Track listing ==
All compositions by Melvin Sparks except where noted.

1. "Love the Life You Live" (Gene Redd, Kool & the Gang) – 5:39
2. "On the Up" – 6:00
3. "All Wrapped Up" – 4:45
4. "Akilah" – 4:42
5. "Blues for J.B." – 7:09
6. "The Image of Love" (Leon Spencer) – 6:49

== Personnel ==
- Melvin Sparks – guitar
- Virgil Jones (tracks 1, 2 & 4), Ernie Royal (track 4) – trumpet
- Sonny Fortune (tracks 1, 2, 4 & 5), George Coleman (track 4) – alto saxophone
- Frank Wess – tenor saxophone (tracks 1, 2 & 4)
- Dave Hubbard – tenor saxophone (track 6), flute (tracks 3)
- Hubert Laws – flute (track 3)
- Leon Spencer – organ, piano
- Idris Muhammad – drums
- Buddy Caldwell – congas
- Billy Ver Planck – arranger (tracks 1 & 2)

=== Production ===
- Ozzie Cadena – producer
- Rudy Van Gelder – engineer
