= The Real Thing (Houston Person album) =

Live album by Houston Person
- Released: 1973
- Recorded: March 14–15, 1973
- Venue: Watt's Club Mozambique, Detroit, MI
- Genre: Jazz
- Length: 78:56
- Label: Eastbound; 2EB-9010
- Producer: Bob Porter

Houston Person chronology
Island Episode (1971/73)	The Real Thing (1973)	Houston Person ’75 (1974)

The Real Thing is a live double LP album by saxophonist Houston Person which was recorded in Detroit in 1973 and released on the Eastbound label.

== Track listing ==
1. "You Are the Sunshine of My Life" (Stevie Wonder) – 8:55
2. "Since I Fell for You" (Buddy Johnson) – 6:23
3. "Until It's Time for You to Go" (Buffy Sainte-Marie) – 4:10
4. "Pain" (Ohio Players) – 13:50
5. "Angel Eyes" (Matt Dennis, Earl Brent) – 7:05
6. "Easy Walker" (Billy Taylor) – 8:30
7. "Kittitian Carnival" (Sonny Phillips) – 7:15
8. "Could It Be I'm Falling in Love" (Melvin Steals, Mervin Steals) – 4:20
9. "Where Is the Love" (Ralph MacDonald, William Salter) – 4:00
10. "'Tain't Nobody's Bizness If I Do" (Porter Grainger, Everett Robbins) – 3:50
11. "Don't Go to Strangers" (Redd Evans, Arthur Kent, Dave Mann) – 3:50
12. "Crazy Legs" (Donald Austin, Woody Wilson) – 6:48

== Personnel ==
- Houston Person – tenor saxophone
- Marcus Belgrave (tracks 4, 7, 8 & 12), Donald Townes (track 7) – trumpet
- Eli Fountain − alto saxophone (track 7)
- Wild Bill Moore − tenor saxophone (track 7)
- Jack McDuff (track 5), Jim Watson (tracks 1, 2, 10 & 11), Sonny Phillips (tracks 3, 4, 6–8 & 12) − organ
- Grant Green (tracks 2, 4–6, 8 & 12), Robert Lowe Jr. (tracks 1, 3, 4 & 7–12) − guitar
- James Jamerson – bass (tracks 4, 8 & 12)
- Hank Brown (tracks 1–3, 7, 9, 10 & 12), Idris Muhammad (tracks 4–6, 8 & 12) −drums
- Buddy Caldwell − congas, tambourine (tracks 1, 4 & 7–11)
- Etta Jones (tracks 10 & 11), Spanky Wilson (track 3) − vocals
