= Nancy Reiner =

American artist

Nancy Beth Reiner (April 21, 1942 – September 9, 2006) was an artist whose work was featured as the cover art of various record albums between 1967 and 1971. She is most notable as the cover artist for The Cry of Love, the 1971 posthumous album by Jimi Hendrix.

== Early life ==
Nancy Reiner graduated in 1960 from Fieldston School in New York City, where she was known for her artistic talent. She later attended Brandeis University.

== Michael Jeffrey and Jimi Hendrix ==
In 1966, Reiner was one of the girlfriends of Michael Jeffrey, who was managing The Animals as of 1966 and subsequently co-managed Jimi Hendrix with ex-Animals bassist Chas Chandler, as of the fall of 1966. Through these circumstances, Reiner was accorded an opportunity to provide the artwork cover for Eric Is Here, an album attributed to Eric Burdon and The Animals, released in early 1967.

Reiner met Jimi Hendrix in 1967, through Michael Jeffrey. Hendrix and Reiner became close friends and occasional romantic partners, from the time of their meeting until his death, in 1970. Among their times together, Reiner and Hendrix traveled to the 1967 Monterey Pop Festival, where Hendrix gave an historic performance, which Reiner sketched. They also traveled together to Toronto, Ontario, Canada, in December 1969, in relation to the 1969 drug trial and acquittal of Hendrix. Hendrix and Reiner also wrote poetry together.

Following the completion of her album cover illustration for Eric Is Here, in 1967, Reiner's art was associated with a number of record releases in 1967 and 1968. While her sketch art approach in Eric Is Here was also used in The Cry of Love, Reiner created a mix of sketch, painting and clay pieces for the album cover art to which she contributed during 1967 and 1968. A clay illustration was the basis of the cover art for a 1967 album by Jimmy Witherspoon with Brother Jack McDuff, The Blues Is Now, on Verve Records. A similar approach was used by Reiner in her cover art for Getting Our Thing Together, an album by Brother Jack McDuff released on Cadet Records in late 1968. On an earlier release of McDuff, Do It Now!, released by Atlantic Records in 1967, Reiner's cover is a pop-art portrait of McDuff. She returned to sketch art for her cover of Alone, an album by jazz pianist Bill Evans, recorded in 1968, and released on Verve Records.

In 1969, Reiner completed a privately distributed book of drawings, The Adventures of JJ or How The Greatest Little Soul Band In The Land Jes Grooved and Grooved and Grooved, relating to singer J.J. Jackson, featuring a cartoon-like cover. A similar style is found in "Phone Home", a formal cartoon by Reiner, published in the fall, 2000 issue of The Realist.

Prior to his untimely death in September 1970, Jimi Hendrix had been planning his first complete album solely under his name, as opposed to his previously released albums as the Jimi Hendrix Experience or Jimi Hendrix and the Band of Gypsys. The album was intended to be a double album, to be called First Rays of The New Rising Sun. Hendrix had personally commissioned French artist Henri Martinez, who was working in New York, to create a painting to be used as the cover art. The painting, which was completed, was not used. Following the death of Hendrix, it was determined by Michael Jeffrey that the first posthumous release would be a single album, with the cover being a sketch of Hendrix by Nancy Reiner. The album, now titled The Cry of Love, was released in 1971, to great success. Reiner's cover art for the album became widely known. Reiner retained the original cover art, which she eventually sold to the Hard Rock Café, due to economic needs and a concern for the preservation of the work.

== Later life ==
Reiner's public artistic output largely ceased, following The Cry of Love album cover. A source of income for Reiner later became the writing of "letters of authentication" in relation to items of Jimi Hendrix that were being sold at auction. She also wrote such letters in relation to auctioned items of Janis Joplin. It is unclear whether Reiner's authentication letters related exclusively or primarily to items that she personally owned. Items associated with such letters continued to be sold after Reiner's death.

Reiner resided on the Upper West Side of Manhattan. In the 1990s, Reiner commenced writing her memoirs, which were ultimately released to members of her family, following her death.

== Death ==
Reiner died suddenly in 2006, from heart failure, related to the effects of asthma. At the time of her death, Reiner was impoverished, living on social assistance from the City of New York. Her death notice, published in the New York Times, in which Reiner is described as an "artist and writer", was paid for by her "Fieldston Friends". After her death, Reiner's apartment was emptied by the City of New York, as no next of kin came forward to do so.

Reiner was survived by three half-siblings, from her father's second marriage, of whom she was aware, but whom she never met, as well as a half-brother from her mother's second marriage. Her half-siblings from her father began searching for Reiner prior to her death, but had only managed to locate Reiner three months after she had died. Reiner's half-siblings from her father initiated a commemorative website in 2009, which was re-launched in 2016, including extracts from her memoirs.
