= Louisiana Slim =

Studio album by Leon Spencer
- Released: 1971
- Recorded: July 7, 1971
- Studio: Van Gelder Studio, Englewood Cliffs, NJ
- Genre: Jazz
- Length: 38:21
- Label: Prestige; PR 10033
- Producer: Bob Porter

Leon Spencer chronology
Sneak Preview! (1970)	Louisiana Slim (1971)	Bad Walking Woman (1972)

Louisiana Slim is the second album by jazz organist Leon Spencer recorded for the Prestige label in 1971.

== Reception ==
Professional ratings
Review scores
Source	Rating
Allmusic	4/5 stars

The Allmusic site awarded the album 4 stars stating "It is a pity that Spencer's career ultimately went nowhere, for he holds his own with his contemporaries throughout this recommended soul-jazz release".

== Track listing ==
All compositions by Leon Spencer except as indicated.

1. "Louisiana Slim" - 10:08
2. "Mercy Mercy Me (The Ecology)" (Marvin Gaye) - 4:06
3. "(They Long to Be) Close to You" (Burt Bacharach, Hal David) - 5:24
4. "Our Love Will Never Die" - 10:17
5. "The Trouble With Love" - 8:26

== Personnel ==
- Leon Spencer - organ
- Virgil Jones - trumpet
- Grover Washington, Jr. - tenor saxophone, flute
- Melvin Sparks - guitar
- Idris Muhammad - drums
- Buddy Caldwell - congas

=== Production ===
- Bob Porter - producer
- Rudy Van Gelder - engineer
