= Billy Hawks =

American jazz musician

William Hawkes (born September 3, 1941), known professionally as Billy Hawks (without the 'e'), was an American R&B and jazz organist.

He was born in Richmond, Virginia, and grew up singing, playing piano, and listening to the blues. In 1961 he joined Steve Gibson's Red Caps, and the following year joined the Modern Flamingos. Under the guidance of manager Clifford Doubledee, he formed his own group, the Billy Hawks Organ Trio, in Philadelphia in 1964, with guitarist Maynard Parker and drummer Henry Terrell. The group performed along the East Coast, notably at Atlantic City.

He recorded his first album, The New Genius of the Blues, for Prestige Records in November 1966, with Terrell, and with guitarist Boogaloo Joe Jones replacing Parker. The album was produced by Cal Lampley. Released in 1967, it was followed by Heavy Soul! (sometimes known as More Heavy Soul!), on which he, Parker and Terrell were joined on some tracks by tenor sax player Buddy Terry. The album was recorded at Rudy Van Gelder's studio in Englewood Cliffs, New Jersey, in December 1967. In 1968, the track "O Baby (I Do Believe I'm Losing You)" was released as a single in France on Stateside (FSS 604) and in 1988 the same track appeared on a BGP Records compilation LP "Dance Juice Vol.2" (BGP 1016) and subsequently, the tune became well-played on the Acid Jazz scene in the UK.

Hawks seems not to have recorded subsequently. According to his younger brother Leroy Hawkes, who performs with a blues and soul band the Hipnotics, Billy Hawks is deceased.

The New Genius Of The Blues and Heavy Soul! were combined and reissued on a single CD by BGP Records in 1998. "O Baby (I Do Believe I'm Losing You)" was sampled by Us3 on their 2002 track "Get Out".
