= The Blues Is Now =

Studio album by Jimmy Witherspoon
- Released: November 1967
- Recorded: 1 June 1967
- Genre: Jump blues
- Length: 31:51
- Label: Verve V6-5030X
- Producer: Ken Druker, Lew Futterman

Jimmy Witherspoon chronology
| In Person (1967) | The Blues Is Now (1967) | Spoonful of Soul (1968) |

The Blues Is Now is a 1967 studio album by the American singer Jimmy Witherspoon, accompanied by organist Jack McDuff.

== Reception ==
Professional ratings
Review scores
| Source | Rating |
|---|---|
| Allmusic | 4/5 stars |

Thomas Ward reviewed the album for Allmusic and described The Blues Is Now as "arguably the finest" of Witherspoon's Verve albums and described his voice as "...in top form and hugely expressive. ...A light-night blues classic, this is Witherspoon at his most relaxed and assured and is a joy to listen to".

== Track listing ==
1. "Sweet Slumber" (Lucky Millinder, Al J. Neiburg, Henri Woode) – 3:53
2. "I'm Gonna Move to the Outskirts of Town" (Andy Razaf, Will Weldon) – 2:48
3. "Past Forty Blues" (Robert Lee Roach, Jimmy Witherspoon) – 4:23
4. "S.K. Blues" (Saunders King) – 2:25
5. "Late One Evening" (Witherspoon) – 3:03
6. "Part Time Woman" (Witherspoon) – 3:31
7. "Good Rocking Tonight" (Roy Brown) – 2:17
8. "I Won't Tell a Soul (I Love You)" (Hughie Clark, Ross Parker) – 5:20
9. "My Baby's Quit Me" (Doc Pomus) – 3:12
10. "My Money's Long This Morning, Baby" (David Parker) – 2:11

== Personnel ==
- Jimmy Witherspoon – vocals
- Jack McDuff – arranger, organ
- Leo Johnson, Danny Turner – alto saxophone, tenor saxophone, flute
- Melvin Sparks – guitar
- Jymie Merritt – bass guitar
- Ray Appleton – drums

Production

- Hollis King – art direction
- Lew Futterman – producer
- Nancy Reiner – cover art
- Acy Lehman – cover design
- Val Valentin – engineer
- Ken Druker – executive producer
- Bob Irwin – mastering
- Jayme Pieruzzi – mastering
- Raymond Ross – photography
- Bryan Koniarz – reissue producer
