= Wild Fire (album) =

Studio album by Rusty Bryant
- Released: 1972
- Recorded: October 4, 1971
- Studio: Van Gelder Studio, Englewood Cliffs, NJ
- Genre: Jazz
- Length: 36:08
- Label: Prestige; PR 10037
- Producer: Bob Porter

Rusty Bryant chronology
Fire Eater (1971)	Wild Fire (1972)	Friday Night Funk for Saturday Night Brothers (1972)

Wild Fire is an album by jazz saxophonist Rusty Bryant recorded for the Prestige label in 1971.

== Reception ==
Professional ratings
Review scores
Source	Rating
Allmusic	3/5 stars

The Allmusic site awarded the album 3 stars stating "More dependable, if rather predictable, early-'70s soul-jazz from Bryant".

== Track listing ==
1. "Wildfire" (Rusty Bryant) - 6:55
2. "It's Impossible" (Armando Manzanero, Sid Wayne) - 5:03
3. "Riders on the Storm" (Jim Morrison, Robby Krieger, Ray Manzarek, John Densmore) - 6:55
4. "The Alobamo Kid" (Rusty Bryant, Bill Mason) - 7:48
5. "If You Really Love Me" (Stevie Wonder, Syreeta Wright) - 5:55
6. "All That I've Got" (Billy Preston, Doris Troy) - 5:30

== Personnel ==
- Rusty Bryant - tenor saxophone
- Bill Mason - organ
- Jimmy Ponder - guitar (tracks 1–6)
- Ernest Reed - guitar (track 1 only)
- Idris Muhammad - drums
- Buddy Caldwell - congas

=== Production ===
- Bob Porter - producer
- Rudy Van Gelder - engineer
