= The Sugar Man =

Studio album by Stanley Turrentine
- Released: 1975
- Recorded: February – June 1971
- Studio: Van Gelder Studio, Englewood Cliffs, NJ
- Genre: Jazz
- Length: 35:29
- Label: CTI Records
- Producer: Creed Taylor

Stanley Turrentine chronology
Sugar (1971)	The Sugar Man (1975)	Salt Song (1971)

The Sugar Man is an album by Stanley Turrentine. The recording is a compilation of four separate dates, each with different conductors, arrangers and other personnel. The album was recorded in 1971 with the CTI label after his successful debut, Sugar, but not released until 1975 after Turrentine had left for Fantasy Records.

== Track listing ==
1. "Pieces of Dreams" (Michel Legrand) - 6:50 (rec. 6/73)
2. "The Stretch" (Stanley Turrentine) - 5:56 (rec. 3/71)
3. "Vera Cruz" (Milton Nascimento) - 5:04 (rec. 4/71)
4. "More (Theme from Mondo Cane)" (Riz Ortolani) - 6:11 (rec. 2/71)
5. "Make Me Rainbows (from Fitzwilly)" (John Williams) - 6:03 (rec. 3/71)
6. "Just As I Am" (Stanley Turrentine) - 5:25 (rec. 2/71)

== Personnel ==
- Stanley Turrentine - tenor sax (all tracks)
- Harold Mabern - piano (track 1)
- Eumir Deodato - electric piano (track 3)
- Butch Cornell - organ (tracks 2,4,5 & 6)
- Ron Carter - bass (all tracks)
- Russell George - additional bass (track 3)
- Idris Muhammad - drums (track 1)
- Billy Cobham - drums (tracks 2,4,5 & 6)
- Joao Palma - drums (track 3)
- Airto Moreira - percussion (track 3)
- Dom Um Romão - percussion (track 3)
- Eric Gale - guitar (track 1)
- Kenny Burrell - guitar (tracks 2 & 5)
- Sivuca - acoustic guitar (track 3)
- George Benson - guitar (tracks 4 & 6)
- Rubens Bassini - conga (track 1)
- Ray Barretto - conga (tracks 2,4,5 & 6)
- Dave Friedman - vibraphone (tracks 4 & 6)
- Blue Mitchell - trumpet (tracks 4 & 6)
- Curtis Fuller - trombone (tracks 4 & 6)
- Jerome Richardson - tenor sax, flute (tracks 4 & 6)

Flutes on track 3:

- Hubert Laws, George Marge, Romeo Penque, Jerome Richardson

== Production ==
- Creed Taylor - Producer
- Rudy Van Gelder - Engineer
- Don Sebesky - Arranger (tracks 4 & 6)
- Chico O'Farrill - Brass Arranger (tracks 4 & 6)
- Bob James - Arranger & Conductor (track 1)
- Eumir Deodato - Arranger & Conductor (track 3)
- Alen MacWeeney - Cover Photography
- Bob Ciano - Album Design
