= So Many Roads (John P. Hammond album) =

Studio album by John P. Hammond
- Released: 1965
- Recorded: 1964
- Studio: Vanguard Studios, New York City, New York, United States
- Genre: Chicago blues; blues rock
- Length: 38:34
- Language: English
- Label: Vanguard

John P. Hammond chronology
Country Blues (1964)	So Many Roads (1965)	Mirrors (1967)

So Many Roads is a 1965 studio album by John P. Hammond, backed by several musicians who would go on to form the Band.

== Recording and release ==
So Many Roads was recorded shortly after Ronnie Hawkins' backing band The Hawks had hit out on their own, eventually naming themselves The Band. Hammond had seen The Hawks while gigging in Toronto and formed a friendship with the band members. The group toured in America's East Coast, so they could easily show up at the studio, where the record label only allowed for a single three-hour session. This was their first time recording without Hawkins. Hammond wanted the entire line-up—which included drummer Levon Helm, organist Garth Hudson, and guitarist Robbie Robertson, who all appear on the album, as well as bassist Rick Danko and keyboardist Richard Manuel—but he was denied by Vanguard Records, who insisted that veteran jazz bassist Jimmy Lewis appear, having played on previous recordings from Hammond. Hammond brought in Chicago blues friends Mike Bloomfield and Charlie Musselwhite to round out the recording.

In the months after this album was released, Hammond was informed that a young Jimi Hendrix—who had recently relocated to New York City—was playing songs from So Many Roads. Hammond went to see him live and immediately introduced him to John H. Hammond, his father and accomplished record producer.

== Critical reception ==
Writing for AllMusic (where the editorial staff gave the album four out of five stars), Richie Unterberger characterizes So Many Roads as "Hammond's most notable mid-'60s Vanguard album" due to the session musicians, calling it "one of the first fully realized blues-rock albums".

== Track listing ==
1. "Down in the Bottom" (Willie Dixon) – 3:01
2. "Long Distance Call" (Muddy Waters) – 3:18
3. "Who Do You Love? (Ellas McDaniel) – 3:00
4. "I Want You to Love Me" (Waters) – 4:05
5. "Judgment Day" (Hammond and Robert Johnson) – 3:22
6. "So Many Roads, So Many Trains" (Marshall Paul) – 2:40
7. "Rambling Blues" (Johnson) – 3:15
8. "O Yea!" (Ellas McDaniel) – 3:32
9. "You Can't Judge a Book by the Cover" (Dixon) – 3:28
10. "Gambling Blues" (Melvin "Lil' Son" Jackson) – 3:10
11. "Baby, Please Don't Go" (Big Joe Williams) – 2:19
12. "Big Boss Man" (Luther Dixon and Al Smith) – 2:40

So Many Roads: The Complete Sessions 2001 bonus tracks

13. "I Wish You Would"
14. "Traveling Riverside"
15. "They Call It Stormy Monday"
16. "Statesboro Blues"
17. "Keys to the Highway"
18. "I Just Got Here"
19. "I'm a Man"
20. "Backdoor Man"
21. "Baby Won't You Tell Me"
22. "I Can't Be Satisfied"
23. "Shake for Me"
24. "I'm Leaving You"

== Personnel ==
- John P. Hammond – vocals, guitar, harmonica

Additional musicians

- Mike Bloomfield – guitar, piano, backing vocals
- Donald Cook – piano on "Judgement Day" and "So Many Roads, So Many Trains"
- Levon Helm – drums, backing vocals (credited as "Mark Levon Helm")
- Garth Hudson – Hammond organ, backing vocals (credited as "Eric Hudson")
- Jimmy Lewis – bass guitar, drums
- Charlie Musselwhite – harmonica, backing vocals
- Robbie Robertson – guitar, backing vocals (credited as "Jaime R. Robertson")

Complete Sessions personnel (tracks 15–21)

- Billy Butler – guitar
- Bobby Donaldson – drums
- Barry Goldberg – electric organ on "I Just Got Here"
- Jimmy Lewis – bass guitar
- Wild Jimmy Spruill – guitar

Complete Sessions personnel (tracks 22–24)

- Duane Allman – lead guitar on "Shake for Me" and "I'm Leaving You"
- Barry Beckett – keyboards
- Roger Hawkins – drums
- Eddie Hinton – guitar
- David Hood – bass guitar

Technical personnel

- Barry Feinstein – photography
- Jules Halfant – design
- Barry Kittleson – liner notes
