= Boogaloo Joe =

Studio album by Joe Jones
- Released: 1969
- Recorded: August 4, 1969
- Studio: Van Gelder Studio, Englewood Cliffs, New Jersey
- Genre: Jazz
- Length: 36:55
- Label: Prestige; PR 7697
- Producer: Bob Porter

Joe Jones chronology
My Fire! (1968)	Boogaloo Joe (1969)	Right On Brother (1970)

Boogaloo Joe is the third album by guitarist Joe Jones which was recorded in 1969 and released on the Prestige label.

== Reception ==
Professional ratings
Review scores
Source	Rating
Allmusic	3/5 stars

Allmusic awarded the album 3 stars stating "It offers more dependable grooves in the same mold, though, mixing originals and covers".

== Track listing ==
All compositions by Joe Jones except where noted.

1. "Boogaloo Joe" – 6:35
2. "Don't Deceive Me (Please Don't Go)" (Chuck Willis) – 8:05 [note: on original LP release, this song was titled "People Are Talking"]
3. "Boardwalk Blues" – 4:18
4. "Dream On Little Dreamer" (Fred Burch, Jan Crutchfield) – 6:40
5. "Atlantic City Soul" – 4:55
6. "6:30 Blues" – 6:22

== Personnel ==
- Joe Jones – guitar
- Rusty Bryant – tenor saxophone
- Sonny Phillips – organ, electric piano
- Eddie Mathias – electric bass
- Bernard Purdie – drums
