= Butch Cornell =

American jazz musician

Butch Cornell (David C. Randolph, Jr. (November 21, 1941 in Chattanooga, Tennessee – December 7, 2008 in Chattanooga, Tennessee) was an American jazz organist.

After initially learning classical piano, Cornell switched to jazz organ upon hearing the early 1960s Jimmy Smith approach to the instrument which was then gaining in popularity. Cornell released Here 'tis Now in 1965 and appeared frequently as a sideman with various recording artists in 1960s and 1970s, chiefly Stanley Turrentine, George Benson, and Freddie Hubbard. His most commercially successful recording was with Turrentine on the 1970 CTI release, Sugar.

== Discography ==
=== As leader ===
- "Here 'tis Now" b/w "Goose Pimples" (Ru-Jac Records, 1965) note: these 2 instrumental tracks were finally released on CD in 2018 by Omnivore Records along with other various Ru-Jac artists as Get Right: The Ru-Jac Records Story, Volume Two (1964-1966).

With Willis Jackson

- Smoking with Willis (Cadet, 1965)

With Boogaloo Joe Jones

- No Way! (Prestige, 1970)
- What It Is (Prestige, 1971)
- Snake Rhythm Rock (Prestige, 1972)

With Johnny Lytle

- People & Love (Milestone, 1972)

With Stanley Turrentine

- Sugar (CTI, 1970)
- The Sugar Man (CTI, 1971 [rel. 1975])
