= Spark Plug (album) =

Studio album by Melvin Sparks
- Released: 1971
- Recorded: March 1 and 8, 1971
- Studio: Van Gelder Studio, Englewood Cliffs
- Genre: Jazz
- Label: Prestige; PR 10016
- Producer: Bob Porter

Melvin Sparks chronology
Sparks! (1970)	Spark Plug (1971)	Akilah! (1972)

Spark Plug is the second album by soul jazz guitarist Melvin Sparks which was recorded for the Prestige label in 1971.

== Reception ==
Professional ratings
Review scores
Source	Rating
AllMusic	3/5 stars

AllMusic awarded the album 3 stars stating "It's more relaxed, funky, occasionally bluesy jazz with guitar and organ to the fore, very much of a piece with the Prestige soul-jazz "house" sound circa 1970".

Album was recently remastered by Jazz Dispensary and available from Vinyl Me, Please. Other musicians on this album include Idris Muhammad, Leon Spencer, and Grover Washtington, Jr.

== Track listing ==
All compositions by Melvin Sparks except where noted.

1. "Who's Gonna Take the Weight" (Ronald Bell, George Brown, Robert Mickens, Claydes Charles Smith, Dennis Thomas, Richard Westfield) – 9:20
2. "Spark Plug" – 8:50
3. "Conjunction Mars" – 8:11
4. "Alone Together" (Howard Dietz, Arthur Schwartz) – 4:14
5. "Dig Dis" – 6:45
- Recorded at Van Gelder Studio in Englewwod Cliffs New Jersey on March 1 (track 1) and March 8 (tracks 2–5), 1971

== Personnel ==
- Melvin Sparks – guitar
- Virgil Jones – trumpet
- Grover Washington, Jr. – tenor saxophone
- Reggie Roberts (tracks 2–5), Leon Spencer (track 1) – organ
- Idris Muhammad – drums
- Bob Porter – producer
- Rudy Van Gelder – engineer
