= 'Gator Tails =

Studio album by Willis Jackson
- Released: 1964
- Recorded: March 18 & June 23, 1964; New York City
- Genre: Jazz
- Label: Verve; V/V6 8589
- Producer: Creed Taylor

Willis Jackson chronology
Tell It... (1964)	'Gator Tails (1964)	Smoking with Willis (1965)

'Gator Tails (also released as Willis Jackson) is an album by saxophonist Willis Jackson with orchestra which was recorded in 1964 and released on the Verve label.

== Reception ==
Professional ratings
Review scores
Source	Rating
Allmusic	3/5 stars

Allmusic awarded the album 3 stars.

== Track listing ==
All compositions by Willis Jackson except where noted.

1. "I Almost Lost My Mind" (Ivory Joe Hunter) – 2:45
2. "The Crocodile" – 4:00
3. "On Broadway" (Barry Mann, Cynthia Weil, Jerry Leiber, Mike Stoller) – 2:23
4. "Swimmin' Home, Baby (Fruit Cake)" (Ben Tucker) – 2:15
5. "The Skillet" (Claus Ogerman) – 2:52
6. "Frankie and Johnny" (Traditional) – 4:18
7. "Someone to Watch Over Me" (George Gershwin, Ira Gershwin) – 4:10
8. "Lonesome Road" (Nathaniel Shilkret, Gene Austin) – 3:24
9. "Early One Morning (Part 2)" – 5:50
- Recorded in New York City on March 18, 1964 (tracks 4 & 9) and June 23, 1964 (tracks 1–3 & 5–8)

== Personnel ==
- Willis Jackson – tenor saxophone
- Robert Banks, Claus Ogerman – arranger, conductor
- Unidentified Orchestra
