= Introducing the Psychedelic Soul Jazz Guitar of Joe Jones =

Studio album by Joe Jones
- Released: 1968
- Recorded: March 15 and December 12, 1967
- Studio: Van Gelder Studio, Englewood Cliffs, New Jersey
- Genre: Jazz
- Length: 38:15
- Label: Prestige; PR 7557
- Producer: Cal Lampley

Joe Jones chronology
Introducing the Psychedelic Soul Jazz Guitar of Joe Jones (1968)	My Fire! (1968)

Introducing the Psychedelic Soul Jazz Guitar of Joe Jones is the debut album by guitarist Joe Jones which was recorded in 1967 and released on the Prestige label.

== Reception ==
Professional ratings
Review scores
Source	Rating
Allmusic	2/5 stars

Allmusic awarded the album 2 stars.

== Track listing ==
All compositions by Joe Jones except as noted

1. "The Mindbender" (Jay Douglas) - 4:50
2. "There Is a Mountain" (Donovan) - 5:34
3. "Games" (Nat Adderley) - 4:20
4. "Sticks and Stones" (Titus Turner) - 5:00
5. "Blues for Bruce" (Jay Douglas) - 5:50
6. "The Beat Goes On" (Sonny Bono) - 3:18
7. "Right Now" - 3:19
8. "Call Me" (Tony Hatch) - 6:04
- Recorded at Van Gelder Studio in Englewood Cliffs, New Jersey on March 15 (tracks 3, 5, 8 & 9) and December 12 (tracks 1, 2, 4, 6 & 7), 1967

== Personnel ==
- Joe Jones - guitar
- Limerick Knowles Jr. organ (tracks 3, 5, 8 & 9)
- Ron Carter - bass (tracks 1, 2, 4, 6 & 7)
- Alexander Witherspoon - electric bass (tracks 3, 5, 8 & 9)
- Ben Dixon (tracks 1, 2, 4, 6 & 7), Bud Kelly (tracks 3, 5, 8 & 9) - drums
- Richie "Pablo" Landrum - congas (tracks 3, 5, 8 & 9)
