= Sugar (Stanley Turrentine album) =

Studio album by Stanley Turrentine
- Released: November 22, 1970
- Recorded: November 1970 (#1–4); Van Gelder Studio, Englewood Cliffs; July 18, 1971 (#5); Hollywood Palladium, Los Angeles
- Genre: Jazz, soul jazz, hard bop
- Length: 44:40 original LP
- Label: CTI; CTI 6005
- Producer: Creed Taylor

Stanley Turrentine chronology
Another Story (1969)	Sugar (1970)	The Sugar Man (1971)

Sugar is an album by jazz tenor saxophonist Stanley Turrentine, his first recorded for the CTI Records label following his long association with Blue Note, featuring performances by Turrentine with trumpeter Freddie Hubbard, guitarist George Benson, bassist Ron Carter and drummer Billy Kaye. Pianist Lonnie Liston Smith is added on the title track, organist Butch Cornell and percussionist Pablo Landrum are on the other two tracks. The CD reissue added a live version of the title track recorded at the Hollywood Palladium in 1971 with flautist Hubert Laws, drummer Billy Cobham, percussionist Airto and keyboardist Johnny Smith.

== Reception ==
The album is one of Turrentine's best-received and was greeted with universal acclaim on release and on subsequent reissues. The AllMusic review by Thom Jurek stated, "If jazz fans are interested in Turrentine beyond the Blue Note period — and they should be — this is a heck of a place to listen for satisfaction". The All About Jazz review by David Rickert states "Seldom does a group of musicians click on all levels and rise into the stratosphere, but this is one such record, a relic from a time when jazz was going through growing pains but still spawning some interesting projects. Turrentine was one of the lucky few who made his crowning achievement during this time".

Professional ratings
Review scores
Source	Rating
AllMusic	4.5/5 stars
The Penguin Guide to Jazz Recordings	3/4 stars
The Rolling Stone Jazz Record Guide	3/5 stars

== Track listing ==
All compositions by Stanley Turrentine except as indicated.

1. "Sugar" - 10:03
2. "Sunshine Alley" (Butch Cornell) - 10:48
3. "Impressions" (John Coltrane) - 14:14
4. "Gibraltar" (Freddie Hubbard) - 9:35 (recorded at original session - not released until CD issue)
5. "Sugar" [Live] - 14:29 Bonus track on the 2001 and 2010 CD releases
- Recorded at Van Gelder Studio, Englewood Cliffs, New Jersey, November 1970 except track 5 recorded live at the Southgate Palace in Los Angeles on July 19, 1971.

== Personnel ==
- Stanley Turrentine - tenor saxophone
- Freddie Hubbard - trumpet
- Lonnie Liston Smith - electric piano (tracks 1,4)
- Butch Cornell - organ (tracks 2,3)
- George Benson - guitar
- Ron Carter - bass
- Billy Kaye - drums (tracks 1–4)
- Richard "Pablo" Landrum - congas (tracks 2,3,4)

=== Track 5 personnel ===
- Stanley Turrentine - tenor saxophone
- Freddie Hubbard - trumpet
- Hubert Laws - flute
- Johnny "Hammond" Smith - organ, electric piano
- George Benson - guitar
- Ron Carter - bass
- Billy Cobham - drums
- Airto Moreira - percussion
