= Stomp Gordon =

American blues pianist and singer (1926–1958)

- Born: Archie A. Gordon; February 10, 1926; Columbus, Ohio, United States
- Died: January 18, 1958 (aged 31) New York City, United States
- Genres: Jump blues
- Occupations: Pianist, singer
- Instruments: Piano, vocals
- Years active: 1948–1958
- Labels: Decca, Mercury, Chess, Savoy

Archie A. Gordon, known professionally as Stomp Gordon (February 10, 1926 – January 18, 1958), was an American jump blues pianist and singer in the 1950s. He led a five-piece ensemble, which was known for their riotous live performances and released eight singles in the decade, including an uproarious skit on the then recent Kinsey Reports on "What's Her Whimsey, Dr Kinsey". However his rather brief recording career finished in his 30th year, and Gordon died in January 1958, aged 31.

== Life and career ==
Archie A. Gordon was born in Columbus, Ohio, United States, to parents William Gordon and Leola Jordan. However, by the age of four he was "adopted" by Squire Bagby and his wife Elizabeth in somewhat mysterious circumstances. He was a musically talented youngster, and at the age of 13, became a local celebrity in Columbus as both a pianist and singer performing at the Nelsonville Eagles Club, Lafayette High School in London, Ohio, and at the Wilberforce University. His local notoriety attracted fellow budding musicians to his family's garage jam sessions. By the age of 16, Gordon was working at Kiri Café, the Musical Bar, El Traviato, and other Central Ohio clubs. His attire of bright ties, dice-capped shoe laces, and a zebra-skin coat, made him a flamboyant presence on stage, further enhanced by occasionally playing the piano with his bare feet, thus giving him the nickname of "Stomp". His antics with the piano earned him an entry in Ripley's Believe It or Not!.

By 1948, Stomp Gordon led his own R&B combo, and eventually recruited Rusty Bryant to play tenor saxophone in his entourage. Such became their reputation that New York-based Decca Records signed them to a recording contract. They released two singles in 1952 but sales were poor and Decca quickly released them. Further short-term recording stints ensued at Mercury, Chess, and Savoy. However, Gordon appeared on Ed Sullivan's Talk of the Town television show, took part in several musical film shorts, supported Billie Holiday in 1954 on an Alaskan tour, enjoyed his own fan club and was named the 17th best pianist in a poll in Downbeat magazine. His musical output varied between the traditional; such as "My Mother's Eyes" and "Pennies from Heaven", popular culture of the day; including "Dragnet" and "Ride Superman, Ride", and light satire relating to the Kinsey Reports on "What's Her Whimsey, Dr Kinsey". Of the thirty or so masters which Stomp and his band recorded, only eight singles were released in a four-year period; four for Decca in 1952 and 1953, two for Mercury in 1953 and 1954, and one each for Chess (1955) and Savoy (1956).

His recording career finished by the age of 30 and signing to Universal Attractions in 1957 made no difference to his failing fortunes. By this stage Gordon was a regular heroin user and was trying to economise by sleeping in his car, rather than a hotel, after concert performances.

== Death ==
On January 19, 1958, Gordon was discovered slumped over the steering wheel of his parked station wagon on Madison Avenue, New York City. His body was taken to Bellevue Morgue where it was formally identified. The New York medical examiners stated that his autopsy found that Gordon had died from a combination of pneumonia and a liver ailment, on January 18. He was aged 31. His body was transferred back to his hometown and interred at Green Lawn Cemetery in Columbus.

== Singles discography ==
A-side	B-side	Record label	Year of release
"Damp Rag"	"Fat Mama Blues"	Decca Records	1952
"Oooh Yes"	"Please Don't Pass Me By"	Decca Records	1952
"Dragnet"	"Sloppy Daddy Blues"	Mercury Records	1953
"Devil's Daughter"	"Hide the Bottle"	Decca Records	1953
"Pennies From Heaven"	"My Mother's Eyes"	Decca Records	1953
"Juicy Lucy"	"What's Her Whimsey, Dr Kinsey"	Mercury Records	1954
"The Grind"	"Don't Do Me That Way"	Chess Records	1955
"Oh Tell Me Why"	"Ride Superman, Ride"	Savoy Records	1956
