= Workin' & Wailin' =

Studio album by Harold Mabern
- Released: 1969
- Recorded: June 30, 1969
- Studio: Van Gelder Studio, Englewood Cliffs, New Jersey
- Genre: Jazz
- Length: 39:59
- Label: Prestige; PR 7687
- Producer: Bob Porter

Harold Mabern chronology
Rakin' and Scrapin' (1968)	Workin' & Wailin' (1969)	Greasy Kid Stuff! (1970)

Workin' & Wailin' is the third album led by pianist Harold Mabern which was recorded in 1968 and released on the Prestige label.

== Reception ==
Professional ratings
Review scores
Source	Rating
Allmusic	3/5 stars

Allmusic awarded the album 3 stars stating "The date utilizes trumpeter Virgil Jones, tenor saxophonist George Coleman, bassist Buster Williams and drummer Idris Muhammad on four challenging Mabern originals and Johnny Mandel's "A Time for Love."

== Track listing ==
All compositions by Harold Mabern except as noted

1. "Too Busy Thinking About My Baby" (Janie Bradford, Norman Whitfield, Barrett Strong) - 4:18
2. "Strozier's Mode" - 7:50
3. "Blues for Phineas" - 5:05
4. "I Can't Understand What I See in You" - 8:40
5. "Waltzing Westward" - 9:16
6. "A Time for Love" (Johnny Mandel, Paul Francis Webster) - 4:50

== Personnel ==
- Harold Mabern - piano, electric piano
- Virgil Jones - trumpet, flugelhorn
- George Coleman - tenor saxophone
- Buster Williams - bass
- Leo Morris - drums
