= Until It's Time for You to Go (album) =

Studio album by Rusty Bryant
- Released: 1974
- Recorded: August 1 & 2, 1974; A & R Studios, New York City
- Genre: Jazz
- Label: Prestige; PR 10085
- Producer: Bob Porter

Rusty Bryant chronology
For the Good Times (1973)	Until It's Time for You to Go (1974)	Rusty Rides Again (1980)

Until It's Time for You to Go is an album by the jazz saxophonist Rusty Bryant, recorded for the Prestige label in 1974.

== Reception ==
Professional ratings
Review scores
Source	Rating
Allmusic	3/5 stars

The Allmusic site awarded the album 3 stars stating "Until It's Time for You to Go is an album of tasteful commercialism... This is not an album of wimpy elevator Muzak; whether he is on alto or tenor, Bryant's playing is gutsy and substantial. And even if some of the material is over-arranged, Bryant still gets in his share of meaty solos. Not everything that Bryant recorded in the '70s was great, but Until It's Time for You to Go is among the late saxman's more memorable albums of that era".

== Track listing ==
All compositions by Horace Ott except as indicated

1. "The Hump Bump" - 5:56
2. "Troubles" (Rev. Leroy Jenkins) - 4:32
3. "Red Eye Special" - 7:23
4. "Draggin' the Line" (Tommy James, Bob King) - 5:22
5. "Until It's Time for You to Go" (Buffy Sainte-Marie) - 5:33
6. "Ga Gang Gang Goong" (Ernie Hayes, Rusty Bryant) - 5:30

== Personnel ==
- Rusty Bryant - alto saxophone, tenor saxophone
- Jon Faddis, Joe Shepley - trumpet
- Billy Campbell, Garnett Brown - trombone
- Seldon Powell - flute, tenor saxophone
- Haywood Henry - flute, baritone saxophone
- Babe Clark - baritone saxophone
- George Devens - vibraphone, percussion
- Horace Ott - piano, clavinet, electric piano, arranger, conductor
- Ernie Hayes - organ
- Hugh McCracken, David Spinozza - guitar
- Wilbur Bascomb - electric bass
- Bernard Purdie - drums

=== Production ===
- Bob Porter - producer
- Don Hahn - engineer
