= Right On Brother =

Studio album by Boogaloo Joe Jones
- Released: 1970
- Recorded: February 16, 1970
- Studio: Van Gelder Studio, Englewood Cliffs, New Jersey
- Genre: Jazz
- Label: Prestige; PR 7766
- Producer: Bob Porter

Boogaloo Joe Jones chronology
Boogaloo Joe (1969)	Right On Brother (1970)	No Way! (1970)

Right On Brother is the fourth album by the American guitarist Boogaloo Joe Jones. It was recorded in 1970 and released on the Prestige label.

== Reception ==
Professional ratings
Review scores
Source	Rating
Allmusic	3/5 stars

Allmusic awarded the album 3 stars stating "A mostly original program of solid, relaxed, and funky (if not quite inspirational) soul-jazz on this 1969 date".

== Track listing ==
All compositions by Ivan "Boogaloo Joe" Jones except where noted

1. "Right On" (Joe Jones) - 5:42
2. "Things Ain't What They Used to Be" (Ted Persons, Mercer Ellington) - 7:05
3. "Poppin'" - 6:08
4. "Someday We'll Be Together" (Jackey Beavers, Johnny Bristol, Harvey Fuqua) - 6:49
5. "Brown Bag" - 5:06
6. "Let It Be Me" (Gilbert Bécaud, Pierre Delanoë, Mann Curtis) - 5:29

== Personnel ==
- Boogaloo Joe Jones - guitar
- Rusty Bryant - tenor saxophone, alto saxophone
- Charles Earland - organ
- Jimmy Lewis - electric bass
- Bernard Purdie - drums
