= Rakin' and Scrapin' =

Studio album by Harold Mabern
- Released: 1969
- Recorded: December 23, 1968
- Studio: Van Gelder Studio, Englewood Cliffs, New Jersey
- Genre: Jazz
- Length: 33:11
- Label: Prestige; PR 7624
- Producer: Bob Porter

Harold Mabern chronology
A Few Miles from Memphis (1968)	Rakin' and Scrapin' (1969)	Workin' & Wailin' (1969)

Rakin' and Scrapin' is the second album led by pianist Harold Mabern that was recorded in 1968 and released on the Prestige label.

== Reception ==
Professional ratings
Review scores
Source	Rating
Allmusic	4/5 stars

Allmusic awarded the album 4 stars, stating that "the music is essentially boppish, with some ballads and blues included. Nothing too substantial occurs, but it is a good modern mainstream effort for the era".

== Track listing ==
All compositions by Harold Mabern except as noted

1. "Rakin' and Scrapin'" – 7:35
2. "Such Is Life – 8:13
3. "Aon" – 9:03
4. "I Heard It Through the Grapevine" (Barrett Strong, Norman Whitfield) – 3:20
5. "Valerie" – 5:00

== Personnel ==
- Harold Mabern – piano, electric piano
- Blue Mitchell – trumpet
- George Coleman – tenor saxophone
- Bill Lee – bass
- Hugh Walker – drums
