= For the Good Times (Rusty Bryant album) =

Studio album by Rusty Bryant
- Released: 1973
- Recorded: March 9, 1973
- Studio: Van Gelder Studio, Englewood Cliffs, NJ
- Genre: Jazz
- Label: Prestige; PR 10073
- Producer: Ozzie Cadena

Rusty Bryant chronology
Friday Night Funk for Saturday Night Brothers (1972)	For the Good Times (1973)	Until It's Time for You to Go (1974)

For the Good Times is an album by jazz saxophonist Rusty Bryant recorded for the Prestige label in 1973.

== Reception ==
Professional ratings
Review scores
Source	Rating
AllMusic	3/5 stars

R.D Lankford of AllMusic states, "Things get started with tepid versions of the title track and Roberta Flack's "Killing Me Softly With His Song," both veering dangerously close to Muzak territory. The pieces are salvaged, however, by Joe Beck and Hugh McCracken's guitar work and Hank Jones' steady hand at the keyboards".

== Track listing ==
1. "For the Good Times" (Kris Kristofferson) - 5:05
2. "Killing Me Softly with His Song" (Charles Fox, Norman Gimbel) - 5:25
3. "The Last One Out" (Rusty Bryant) - 6:25
4. "Appalachian Green" (Don Hales) - 5:00
5. "A Night in Tunisia" (Dizzy Gillespie, Frank Paparelli) - 5:30
6. "Looking Through the Eyes of Love" (Barry Mann, Cynthia Weil) - 3:40
7. "Theme from Deep Throat" (Robert Whitaker) - 4:30

== Personnel ==
- Rusty Bryant - tenor saxophone
- Hank Jones - electric piano
- Joe Beck, Hugh McCracken - guitar
- Tony Levin - bass, electric bass
- Steve Gadd - drums

=== Production ===
- Ozzie Cadena - producer
- Rudy Van Gelder - engineer
