= Rusty Bryant Returns =

Studio album by Rusty Bryant
- Released: 1969
- Recorded: February 17, 1969
- Studio: Van Gelder Studio, Englewood Cliffs, NJ
- Genre: Jazz
- Length: 43:22
- Label: Prestige; PR 7626
- Producer: Bob Porter

Rusty Bryant chronology
Rusty Bryant Plays Jazz (1957)	Rusty Bryant Returns (1969)	Night Train Now! (1969)

Rusty Bryant Returns is an album by jazz saxophonist Rusty Bryant recorded for the Prestige label in 1969. The album marked Bryant's return to recording, being the first under his leadership since 1957.

== Reception ==
Professional ratings
Review scores
Source	Rating
Allmusic	4/5 stars

The Allmusic site awarded the album 4 stars stating "The music (mostly blues-oriented originals) is enjoyable, with plenty of boogaloos and soulful vamps".

== Track listing ==
All compositions by Rusty Bryant except as noted

1. "Zoo Boogaloo" - 7:19
2. "The Cat" (Lalo Schifrin) - 7:49
3. "Ready Rusty?" - 4:46
4. "Streak O' Lean" - 5:56
5. "Night Flight" - 7:53
6. "All Day Long" (Kenny Burrell) - 9:39

== Personnel ==
- Rusty Bryant - alto saxophone
- Sonny Phillips - organ
- Grant Green - guitar
- Bob Bushnell - bass
- Herbie Lovelle - drums

=== Production ===
- Bob Porter - producer
- Rudy Van Gelder - engineer
