= Wild Flower (Houston Person album) =

Studio album by Houston Person
- Released: 1978
- Recorded: September 12, 1977
- Studios: Van Gelder Studio, Englewood Cliffs, NJ
- Genre: Jazz
- Length: 33:30
- Labels: Muse; MR 5161
- Producer: Houston Person

Houston Person chronology
Harmony (1977)	Wild Flower (1978)	The Nearness of You (1977)

Wild Flower' is an album by saxophonist Houston Person recorded in 1977 and released on the Muse label.

== Reception ==
Professional ratings
Review scores
Source	Rating
Allmusic	4/5 stars

Allmusic awarded the album 4 stars noting that "Person never received much publicity but has been near the top of his field since the late '60s. His basic, swinging approach has resulted in a consistent string of rewarding and accessible albums ... Worth searching for".

== Track listing ==
1. "Preachin' and Teachin'" (Sonny Phillips) - 7:40
2. "Dameron" (Tadd Dameron) - 7:30
3. "Wildflower" (Doug Edwards, Dave Richardson) - 6:50
4. "Ain't Misbehavin'" (Fats Waller, Harry Brooks, Andy Razaf) - 6:00
5. "My Romance" (Lorenz Hart, Richard Rodgers) - 5:30

== Personnel ==
- Houston Person - tenor saxophone
- Bill Hardman - trumpet
- Jimmy Ponder - guitar
- Sonny Phillips - organ
- Idris Muhammad - drums
- Larry Killan - congas, percussion
