= Smoking with Willis =

Studio album by Willis Jackson
- Released: 1966
- Recorded: November 1965
- Studio: dA&R Recording Studios, New York City
- Genre: Jazz
- Label: Cadet; LP 763
- Producer: Esmond Edwards

Willis Jackson chronology
'Gator Tails (1964)	Smoking with Willis (1966)	Soul Grabber (1966)

Professional ratings
Review scores
Source	Rating
Allmusic	3/5 stars

Smoking with Willis is an album by saxophonist Willis Jackson which was recorded in New York City in 1965 and released on the Cadet label.

== Track listing ==
All compositions by Willis Jackson and David C. Randolph (AKA Butch Cornell) except where noted.

1. "Doin' the Mudcat" – 4:15
2. "And I Love Her" (Lennon–McCartney) – 5:35
3. "Goose Pimples" – 4:42
4. "Yesterday" (Lennon, McCartney) – 3:08
5. "Broadway" (Billy Byrd, Teddy McRae, Henri Woode) – 6:50
6. "Who Can I Turn To?" (Leslie Bricusse, Anthony Newley) – 4:43
7. "A Hard Day's Night" (Lennon, McCartney) – 5:35

== Personnel ==
- Willis Jackson – tenor saxophone
- Franklyn Robinson – trumpet
- Butch Cornell – organ
- Vinnie Corrao – guitar
- Bob Bushnell – bass
- David Niskanan – drums
