= Soul Liberation =

Studio album by Rusty Bryant
- Released: 1970
- Recorded: June 15, 1970
- Studio: Van Gelder Studio, Englewood Cliffs, NJ
- Genre: Jazz
- Length: 39:35
- Label: Prestige; PR 7798
- Producer: Bob Porter

Rusty Bryant chronology
Night Train Now! (1969)	Soul Liberation (1970)	Fire Eater (1971)

Soul Liberation is an album by jazz saxophonist Rusty Bryant recorded for the Prestige label in 1970.

== Reception ==
Professional ratings
Review scores
Source	Rating
Allmusic	4.5/5 stars

The Allmusic site awarded the album 4½ stars stating "This has a bluesier, harder R&B feel than his previous effort (Night Train Now), courtesy of a revamped lineup".

== Track listing ==
All compositions by Rusty Bryant except where noted

1. "Cold Duck Time" (Eddie Harris) - 6:19
2. "The Ballad of Oren Bliss" - 5:59
3. "Lou-Lou" (Charles Earland) - 8:12
4. "Soul Liberation" (Earland) - 11:35
5. "Freeze-Dried Soul" - 7:30

== Personnel ==
- Rusty Bryant - alto saxophone, tenor saxophone
- Virgil Jones - trumpet
- Charles Earland - organ
- Melvin Sparks - guitar
- Idris Muhammad - drums

=== Production ===
- Bob Porter - producer
- Rudy Van Gelder - engineer
