= The Nearness of You (Houston Person album) =

Studio album by Houston Person
- Released: 1978
- Recorded: November 1977
- Studio: Van Gelder Studio, Englewood Cliffs, NJ
- Genre: Jazz
- Length: 33:30
- Label: Muse; MR 5178
- Producer: Houston Person

Houston Person chronology
Wild Flower (1977)	The Nearness of You (1978)	The Gospel Soul of Houston Person (1978)

The Nearness of You' is an album by saxophonist Houston Person recorded in 1977 and released on the Muse label.

== Reception ==
Professional ratings
Review scores
Source	Rating
Allmusic	4/5 stars

Allmusic awarded the album 4 stars noting that "The soulful and always-swinging tenor Houston Person is in typically fine form on this enjoyable LP... A fun date".

== Track listing ==
1. "Pretty Please" (Harold Ousley) – 8:00
2. "Please Mr. Person" (Buddy Johnson) – 4:38
3. "I Hope I Can Love Again" (Ousley) – 5:00
4. "Freddie the Freeloader" (Miles Davis) – 5:29
5. "The Nearness of You" (Hoagy Carmichael, Ned Washington) – 4:59
6. "Mean to Me" (Fred E. Ahlert, Roy Turk) – 5:18

== Personnel ==
- Houston Person – tenor saxophone
- Virgil Jones – trumpet
- Melvin Sparks – guitar
- Charles Earland – organ
- Sonny Phillips – electric piano
- Mervyn Bronson – bass
- Grady Tate – drums
- Lawrence Killian – percussion
- Ella Johnson – vocals (track 2)
