= Jackson's Action! =

Live album by Willis Jackson
- Released: 1965
- Recorded: March 21, 1964; The Allegro, New York City
- Genre: Jazz
- Label: Prestige; PRLP 7348

Willis Jackson chronology
Boss Shoutin' (1964)	Jackson's Action! (1965)	Live! Action (1964)

Jackson's Action! is a live album by saxophonist Willis Jackson which was recorded in New York City in 1964, and released on the Prestige label. Three additional albums were released from the same performance Live! Action, Soul Night/Live!, and Tell It....

== Reception ==
Professional ratings
Review scores
Source	Rating
Allmusic	3/5 stars

Allmusic awarded the album 3 stars.

== Track listing ==
All compositions by Willis Jackson except as indicated

1. "Jackson's Action" - 3:10
2. "A Lot of Livin' to Do" (Charles Strouse, Lee Adams) - 6:55
3. "I Wish You Love" (Charles Trenet, Albert Beach) - 3:28
4. "Monkey Hips" - 5:20
5. "A'w Right-Do It!" - 6:00
6. "Jive Samba" (Nat Adderley) - 10:20
- Recorded at The Allegro in New York City on March 21, 1964

== Personnel ==
- Willis Jackson - tenor saxophone
- Frank Robinson - trumpet
- Carl Wilson - organ
- Pat Martino - guitar
- Joe Hadrick - drums
