= The Scorpion (album) =

Live album by Lou Donaldson
- Released: 1995
- Recorded: November 7, 1970
- Venue: The Cadillac Club, Newark, New Jersey
- Genre: Jazz
- Length: 46:32
- Label: Blue Note
- Producer: Francis Wolff

Lou Donaldson chronology
Pretty Things (1970)	The Scorpion (1995)	Cosmos (1971)

Professional ratings
Review scores
Source	Rating
Allmusic	2/5 stars

The Scorpion: Live at the Cadillac Club is a live album by jazz saxophonist Lou Donaldson recorded in Newark, New Jersey in 1970 for the Blue Note label featuring a performance by Donaldson with Fred Ballard, Leon Spencer, Melvin Sparks, and Idris Muhammad.

The album was awarded 2 stars in an Allmusic review by Scott Yanow who states "The repertoire is dominated by lengthy funk grooves that are quite danceable but never develop beyond the obvious".

== Track listing ==
All compositions by Lou Donaldson except as indicated

1. "The Scorpion" (Leon Spencer) - 10:47
2. "Laura" (Johnny Mercer, David Raksin) - 5:55
3. "Alligator Bogaloo" - 13:15
4. "The Masquerade Is Over" (Herb Magidson, Allie Wrubel) - 4:15
5. "Peepin'" (Lonnie Smith) - 5:30 Bonus track on CD
6. "Footpattin' Time" (AKA "Jump Up") - 6:50 Bonus track on CD

- Recorded at the Cadillac Club, Newark, NJ on November 7, 1970.

== Personnel ==
- Lou Donaldson - alto saxophone
- Fred Ballard - trumpet
- Leon Spencer - organ
- Melvin Sparks - guitar
- Idris Muhammad - drums
