= Tell It... =

Live album by Willis Jackson
- Released: 1967
- Recorded: March 21, 1964; The Allegro, New York City
- Genre: Jazz
- Label: Prestige; PR 7412
- Producer: Ozzie Cadena

Willis Jackson chronology
Soul Night/Live! (1964)	Tell It... (1967)	'Gator Tails (1964)

Tell It... is a live album by saxophonist Willis Jackson which was recorded in New York City in 1964 and released on the Prestige label in 1967. It was the fourth album to be released from the same performance following Jackson's Action!, Live! Action, and Soul Night/Live!.

== Reception ==
Professional ratings
Review scores
Source	Rating
Allmusic	3/5 stars

Allmusic awarded the album 3 stars stating "It's staunch mid-'60s soul-jazz".

== Track listing ==
All compositions by Willis Jackson except as indicated

1. "I Can't Stop Loving You" (Don Gibson) - 6:34
2. "One Mint Julep" (Rudy Toombs) - 4:05
3. "(Up A) Lazy River" (Hoagy Carmichael, Sidney Arodin) - 3:10
4. "Jumpin' with Symphony Sid" (Lester Young) - 4:00
5. "Tangerine" (Victor Schertzinger, Johnny Mercer) - 3:30
6. "Ebb Tide" (Carl Sigman, Robert Maxwell) - 4:30
7. "Blue Gator" - 6:00
8. "Secret Love" (Sammy Fain, Paul Francis Webster) - 3:30
- Recorded at The Allegro in New York City on March 21, 1964

== Personnel ==
- Willis Jackson - tenor saxophone
- Frank Robinson - trumpet
- Carl Wilson - organ
- Pat Martino - guitar
- Joe Hadrick - drums
