= Pisces Calling =

Studio album by Harold Mabern
- Released: 1980
- Recorded: June 1978
- Studios: Blank Tapes Studio, New York City
- Genre: Jazz
- Label: Trident

Harold Mabern chronology
| Greasy Kid Stuff! (1970) | Pisces Calling (1978) | Joy Spring (1985) |

Pisces Calling is an album by pianist Harold Mabern. It was recorded in 1978 and was released by Trident Records.

== Recording and music ==
The album was recorded at Blank Tapes Studio, New York City, in June 1978. The musicians were Mabern on piano, electric piano and synthesizer, Jamil Nasser on bass, and Walter Bolden on drums. All of the compositions were written by Mabern, with the exception of the title track, which was written by Keno Duke, a drummer with whom Mabern played in the 1970s. "Edward Lee" refers to trumpeter Lee Morgan, with whom Mabern played. On "Too Late to Fall Back Baby", Mabern uses a synthesizer to add horn sounds to his electric piano playing.

== Release and reception ==
Pisces Calling was released by Trident Records on LP, and was reissued on CD in Japan in 2009. Crtiic Marc Myers wrote: "Throughout Pisces Calling, Mabern's fingering is commanding and lyrical. His chords aren't merely played but hurled like fistfuls of darts, and there's an urgent snap to his delivery. His use of three different keyboards on different songs provides the album with texture and dimensional moods." The New York Daily News reviewer commented that the title track "ebbs and flows with surging chords and liquid arpeggios strongly evocative of the sea. And Mabern sails through it as if he were riding the crest of a whitecap."

== Track listing ==
Side one

1. "Pisces Calling" – 4:56
2. "The Lyrical Cole-Man" – 6:59
3. "Waltzing Westward" – 8:04

Side two

1. "Too Late to Fall Back Baby" – 4:12
2. "Edward Lee" – 6:58

== Personnel ==
- Harold Mabern – piano, electric piano, synthesizer
- Jamil Nasser – bass
- Walter Bolden – drums
