= Black Whip =

Studio album by Ivan "Boogaloo Joe" Jones
- Released: 1973
- Recorded: July 25, 1973
- Studio: Broadway Recording Studios, New York City
- Genre: Jazz
- Label: Prestige; PR 10072
- Producer: Ozzie Cadena

Ivan "Boogaloo Joe" Jones chronology
Snake Rhythm Rock (1972)	Black Whip (1973)	Sweetback (1975)

Black Whip is the eighth album by guitarist Boogaloo Joe Jones which was recorded in 1973 and released on the Prestige label.

== Reception ==
Professional ratings
Review scores
Source	Rating
Allmusic	3/5 stars

Allmusic awarded the album 3 stars.

== Track listing ==
All compositions by Ivan "Boogaloo Joe" Jones except where noted.

1. "Black Whip" – 6:45
2. "My Love" (Linda McCartney, Paul McCartney) – 5:26
3. "Freak Off" – 8:29
4. "Daniel" (Elton John, Bernie Taupin) – 4:20
5. "Ballad of Mad Dogs and Englishmen" (Leon Russell) – 6:56
6. "Crank Me Up" – 7:06

== Personnel ==
- Ivan "Boogaloo Joe" Jones – guitar
- Dave Hubbard – soprano saxophone, tenor saxophone, percussion
- Bobby Knowles- organ
- Sonny Phillips – electric piano
- Ron Carter – bass, electric bass
- Bud Kelly – drums, percussion
- Jimmy Johnson – percussion
