= Sparks! =

Studio album by Melvin Sparks
- Released: 1970
- Recorded: September 14, 1970; Van Gelder Studio, Englewood Cliffs
- Genre: Jazz
- Label: Prestige; PR 10001
- Producer: Bob Porter

Melvin Sparks chronology
Sparks! (1970)	Spark Plug (1971)

Sparks! is the debut album by soul jazz guitarist Melvin Sparks recorded for the Prestige label in 1970.

== Reception ==
Professional ratings
Review scores
Source	Rating
Allmusic	3/5 stars

The Allmusic site awarded the album 3 stars calling it "A solid soul-jazz outing that looks to commercial material for the bulk of the set, but doesn't unduly compromise itself in a pop direction... commercial choices, to be sure, but executed with relaxed grit".

== Track listing ==
1. "Thank You (Falettinme Be Mice Elf Agin)" (Sly Stone) - 8:08
2. "I Didn't Know What Time It Was" (Lorenz Hart, Richard Rodgers) - 6:35
3. "Charlie Brown" (Jerry Leiber, Mike Stoller) - 5:55
4. "The Stinker" (Leon Spencer) - 7:00
5. "Spill the Wine" (Papa Dee Allen, Harold Ray Brown, B.B. Dickerson, Lonnie Jordan, Charles Miller, Lee Oskar, Howard Scott) - 11:10

== Personnel ==
- Melvin Sparks - guitar
- Virgil Jones - trumpet
- John Manning, Houston Person (tracks 3 & 4) - tenor saxophone
- Leon Spencer - organ
- Idris Muhammad - drums

=== Production ===
- Bob Porter - producer
- Rudy Van Gelder - engineer
