= Casey Anderson (musician) =

American singer-songwriter (1934–c.1976)

- Born: Charles Henry Anderson; October 5, 1934; Chicago, Illinois, U.S.
- Died: 1976 (aged 41–42) probably Altadena, California, U.S.
- Genres: Blues, folk, jazz, country, pop
- Occupations: Singer, songwriter
- Instrument: Guitar
- Years active: Late 1950s – 1976
- Labels: Urania, Elektra, Sutton, Atco, Super Star, Reprise, Amos, Greene Mountain, Edge, Chelsea

Charles Henry "Casey" Anderson (October 5, 1934 – c. 1976) was an American blues and folk singer, songwriter and guitarist. From 1959 to 1976, he recorded ten albums and some fifteen singles on various labels, most notably Elektra and Atco.

== Life and career ==
Anderson was born in Chicago, but grew up in Okmulgee, Oklahoma, where both his parents were college teachers. He was aged 5 at the time of the 1940 US census. In 1945, the family moved to Montgomery, Alabama, when his parents started working at Alabama State College. He grew up listening to folk and country music, but did not start performing until he attended Maryland State College, where he sang, wrote songs, and played guitar in small jazz groups. Following his graduation with a degree in History and Sociology, he returned to Alabama to work as a high school teacher, while maintaining a singing career by performing in nightclubs and local shows.

After being drafted into the Army and serving in Korea, he gave up teaching and moved to New York City to work as a musician. He placed an emphasis on versatility and variety, writing many of his own songs and performing on a range of instruments – it was said of him in 1970 that he had written over 300 songs, as well as books, and played 14 instruments in styles that included country, blues, jazz, and pop. His first recordings were released as the 1959 album Casey Sings Out, on the Urania label, which was recorded with a small group comprising Art Ryerson (guitar and banjo), Sandy Block (bass), and drummers Phil Krauss and Bunny Shawker. He moved to Elektra Records, which released the album Goin' Places in 1960, and recorded a one-off single on the Sutton label, "Freedom Rider", in 1961.

He then moved to Atco Records. His first album for Atco, The Bag I'm In (1962), was recorded by Tom Dowd and supervised by Nesuhi Ertegun, and featured musicians Carl Lynch and Bruce Langhorne (guitars), Bob Bushnell (bass), and Panama Francis (drums). Though the title song was written by Fred Neil, most of the other songs were traditional. Anderson also performed in prestigious nightclubs and on networked TV shows, as well as recording interviews and performances with both Cynthia Gooding and Oscar Brand. In 1964, he released the album More Pretty Girls Than One, recorded with a group, The Realists, comprising Anne Stern, Gene Mitchell and Felix Pappalardi. He recorded a live show in Pasadena, California, released in 1965 as "Live" at the Ice House, and the same year issued his final Atco album, Blues Is A Woman Gone, again recorded with Lynch, Bushnell and Francis. The album features a cover photograph of Nico (Christa Päffgen), who at the time was working uncredited as a model. Atco also released several singles by Anderson, but none were commercially successful. However, his 1959 album Casey Sings Out was reissued in 1965 as Casey Anderson Sings Folk Songs on the Forum Circle label.

After leaving Atco, he recorded the album The Kind Of Man I Am, produced by Ed Hansen for Gold Star Productions in Hollywood and released by the small Super Star label. He also released two singles for the Reprise label, both produced by Glen D. Hardin, and then two for the Amos label, including a version of Bob Dylan's "I'll Be Your Baby Tonight" in 1970. Anderson continued to perform in clubs and on campuses around the country. In 1974, he released the album Good Old Boys as a tribute to country music stars including Hank Williams, Jim Reeves, Patsy Cline and Johnny Horton. The album was aimed at radio station plays. It was again produced in Hollywood, as was Anderson's final album, Passing Time, released on the Chelsea label in 1976 and at least partly comprising earlier recordings.

Anderson died c. 1976, probably in Altadena, California, after having a leg amputated as a result of severe diabetes.

== Discography ==
=== Albums ===
- Casey Sings Out (Urania, 1959)
  - reissued as Casey Anderson Sings Folk Songs (Forum Circle, 1965)
- Goin' Places (Elektra, 1960)
- The Bag I'm In (Atco, 1962)
- More Pretty Girls Than One (Atco, 1964)
- "Live" at the Ice House (Atco, 1965)
- Blues Is A Woman Gone (Atco, 1965)
- The Kind Of Man I Am (Super Star, 1965)
- Good Old Boys (Edge, 1974)
- Passing Time (Chelsea, 1976)

=== Singles ===
- "Freedom Rider" / "Grim Reaper" (Sutton, 1961)
- "Old Jay Gould" / "Easy Rider" (Atco, 1963)
- "Sweet Sidney" / "Easy Rider" (Atco, 1963)
- "This Little Light of Mine" / "Green Rocky Road" (Atco, 1963)
- "More Pretty Girls Than One" / "San Francisco Bay Blues" (Atco, 1964)
- "Say Yes" / "Blues Is A Woman Gone" (Atco, 1965)
- "Things You Do" / "God Knows I Love You" (Reprise, 1968)
- "Gentle Lovin'" / "Suburbia" (Reprise, 1969)
- "I'll Be Your Baby Tonight" / "Monsoon Season Hungries" (Amos, 1970)
- "Sunday Joe" / same (Amos, 1970)
- "The I Love You Waltz" / same (Amos, 1970)
- "Where Will I Find A Place To Sleep This Evening" / same (Greene Mountain, 1973)
- "Good Old Boys" / "California Calico Buckskin Breakdown Band" (Edge, 1974)
- "Country Music Is Alive And Well" / "The I Love You Waltz" (Edge, 1975)
- "Denver Dawg" / same (Edge, 1976)
