= Soul Grabber =

Studio album by Willis Jackson
- Released: 1968
- Recorded: October 20 & 25, 1967
- Studio: New York City and Van Gelder Studio, Englewood Cliffs, New Jersey
- Genre: Jazz
- Label: Prestige; PR 7551
- Producer: Cal Lampley

Willis Jackson chronology
Smoking with Willis (1965)	Soul Grabber (1968)	Star Bag (1968)

Soul Grabber is an album by saxophonist Willis Jackson which was recorded in 1967 and released on the Prestige label.

== Reception ==
Professional ratings
Review scores
Source	Rating
Allmusic	3/5 stars

Allmusic awarded the album 3 stars.

== Track listing ==
All compositions by Willis Jackson except where noted.

1. "The Song Of Ossahna" (Vinícius de Moraes, Baden Powell) – 2:40
2. "Sunny" (Bobby Hebb) – 6:30
3. "Girl Talk" (Neal Hefti, Bobby Troup) – 5:20
4. "Ode to Billie Joe" (Bobbie Gentry) – 2:50
5. "Sometimes I'm Happy" (Vincent Youmans, Irving Caesar) – 5:10
6. "Soul Grabber" – 2:00
7. "Rhode Island Red" – 3:30
8. "Alfie" (Burt Bacharach, Hal David) – 8:18
9. "I Dig Rock And Roll Music" (Paul Stookey, Jim Mason, Dave Dixon) – 2:45
10. "These Blues are Made for Walking" – 5:40
- Recorded in New York City on October 20, 1967 (tracks 1, 4, 9 & 10) and at Van Gelder Studio in Englewood Cliffs, New Jersey on October 25, 1967 (tracks 2, 3 & 5–8)

== Personnel ==
- Willis Jackson – tenor saxophone
- Wilbur Bascomb, Sammy Lowe – trumpet
- Haywood Henry – baritone saxophone (tracks 1, 4, 9 & 10)
- Carl Wilson – organ
- Lloyd Davis, Wally Richardson – guitar
- Bob Bushnell – electric bass
- Lawrence Wrice – drums
