= Bob Bushnell =

American jazz musician (1915–2016)

Robert C. Bushnell (September 3, 1915 – January 31, 2016) was an American bass player and guitarist who has appeared on dozens of albums and singles as a studio musician, including Bobby Lewis's hit "Tossin' and Turnin'" (1961), "My Boyfriend's Back" by the Angels (1963), "Under the Boardwalk" by the Drifters (1964) and the remixed hit version of Simon and Garfunkel's "The Sound of Silence" (1965).

Bushnell was born in West Philadelphia and attended Sulzberger Junior High School where he first learned how to play bass fiddle. He graduated from West Philadelphia High School in 1945 and left for New York City shortly thereafter. He played occasionally with Jimmy Heath's band in the late 1940s, coinciding with John Coltrane.

He played in the first house band at Philadelphia's Club 421, a lineup led by Charlie Rice, and featuring Vance Wilson, Red Garland, and Johnny Hughes. He went on to become a member of Louis Jordan's bands (both the Orchestra and his Tympany Five). In 1952, he married the band's vocalist, Elaine Dash Robinson, with whom he later formed a group.

== Discography ==
=== As sideman ===
With Gene Ammons

- The Boss Is Back! (Prestige, 1969)
- Brother Jug! (Prestige, 1970)
- Son of a Preacher Man (Prestige, 1970)

With Billy Butler

- This Is Billy Butler! (Prestige, 1969)
- Guitar Soul! (Prestige, 1969)
- Night Life (Prestige, 1971)

With others

- Casey Anderson, The Bag I'm In (Atco, 1962)
- Eric Andersen, More Hits from Tin Can Alley (Vanguard, 1968)
- George Benson, Tell It Like It Is (A&M, 1969)
- Chuck Berry, Berry Is on Top (Chess, 1959)
- Rusty Bryant, Rusty Bryant Returns (Prestige, 1969)
- Solomon Burke, If You Need Me (Atlantic, 1963)
- Solomon Burke, King Solomon (Atlantic, 1968)
- Lincoln Chase, Lincoln Chase 'n You (Paramount, 1973)
- King Curtis, Old Gold (Tru-Sound, 1961)
- Dizzy Gillespie, It's My Way (Solid State, 1969)
- Tim Hardin, Tim Hardin 1 (Verve, 1966)
- Johnny Hodges & Wild Bill Davis, Joe's Blues (Verve, 1965)
- Johnny Hodges & Wild Bill Davis, Blue Pyramid (Verve, 1966)
- Ian & Sylvia, So Much for Dreaming (Vanguard, 1967)
- Janis Ian, Who Really Cares (Verve Forecast, 1969)
- The Insect Trust, Hoboken Saturday Night (Atco, 1970)
- Willis Jackson, Smoking with Willis (Cadet, 1965)
- Willis Jackson, Soul Grabber (Prestige, 1967)
- Etta Jones, From the Heart (Prestige, 1962)
- Barbara Lewis, Workin' on a Groovy Thing (Atlantic, 1968)
- Galt MacDermot, Galt MacDermot Conducts Two Gentlemen of Verona (Kilmarnock, 1972)
- Gary McFarland, The In Sound (Verve, 1966)
- Gary McFarland, Tijuana Jazz (Impulse!, 1966)
- Jimmy McGriff, The Worm (Solid State, 1968)
- Van Morrison, T.B. Sheets (Bang, 1973)
- Houston Person, Goodness! (Prestige, 1969)
- Houston Person, Truth! (Prestige, 1970)
- Esther Phillips, Esther Phillips Sings (Atlantic, 1966)
- Bernard Purdie, Soul Drums (Date, 1967)
- Tom Rush, The Circle Game (Elektra, 1968)
- Jimmy Rushing, Every Day I Have the Blues (Impulse!, 1967)
- Jimmy Rushing, Livin' the Blues (BluesWay, 1968)
- Archie Shepp, For Losers (Impulse!, 1970)
- Archie Shepp, Kwanza (Impulse!, 1974)
- Nina Simone, Nina Simone Sings the Blues (RCA Victor, 1967)
- Jimmy Smith, Any Number Can Win (Verve, 1963)
- Jimmy Smith, Respect (Verve, 1967)
- Johnny "Hammond" Smith, Soul Talk (Prestige, 1969)
- Johnny Smith, Phase II (Verve, 1968)
- Sonny Stitt, Little Green Apples (Solid State, 1969)
- Gabor Szabo, Jazz Raga (Impulse!, 1966)
- Gábor Szabó, Simpático (Impulse!, 1966)
- Toots Thielemans, Yesterday & Today (Universal, 2012)
- Cal Tjader, Soul Sauce (Verve, 1965)
- The Manhattan Transfer, Jukin' (Capitol, 1971)
- Big Joe Turner, Singing the Blues (BluesWay, 1967)
- Kai Winding, Rainy Day (Verve, 1965)
