= Al Casey (jazz guitarist) =

American jazz guitarist (1915–2005)

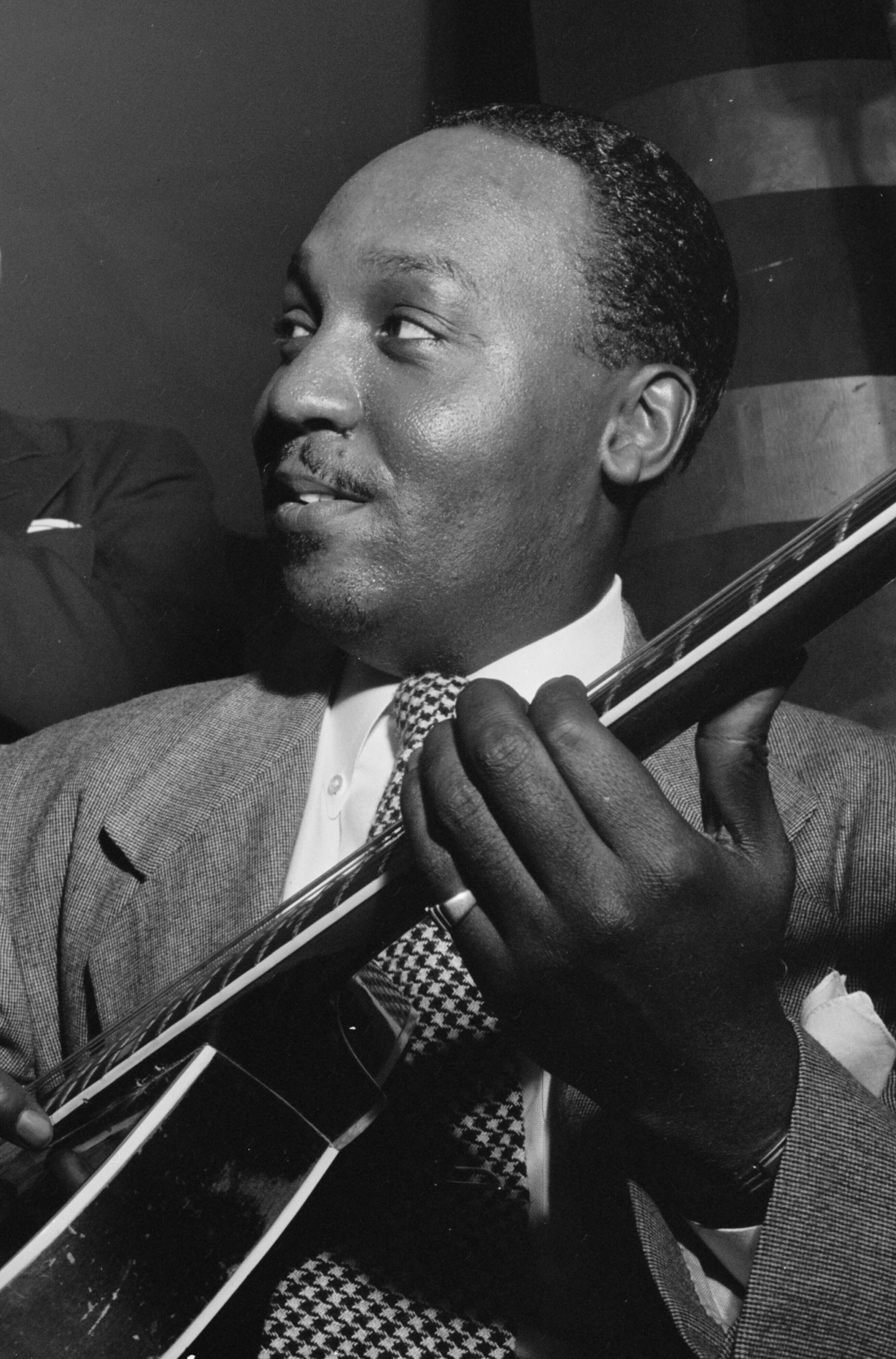
- Al Casey, Cafe Society, New York City, c. 1947; Photograph by William P. Gottlieb

Background information
- Born: Albert Aloysius Casey; September 15, 1915; Louisville, Kentucky, U.S.
- Died: September 11, 2005 (aged 89) New York City, U.S.
- Genres: Jazz, swing
- Occupation: Guitarist
- Years active: 1934–2004

Albert Aloysius Casey (September 15, 1915 – September 11, 2005) was an American jazz guitarist who was a member of Fats Waller's band during the 1930s and early 1940s.

== Career ==
Casey was born in Louisville, Kentucky. He attended DeWitt Clinton High School in New York City and studied guitar.

He was a child prodigy who first played violin, then switched to ukulele. He began playing guitar in 1930 and met Fats Waller in 1933. The following year, at the age of eighteen, he became a member of Waller's band, making many recordings with the band, and he is known for having played the solo in "Buck Jumpin'". After Waller's death in 1943, he led his own trio. For two consecutive years in the 1940s, he was voted best guitarist in Esquire magazine.

From 1957, he was a member of a rhythm and blues band led by King Curtis. Four years later he dropped out of music, though he returned in the 1970s to record with Helen Humes and Jay McShann. Another absence followed until 1981, when he returned to music to play with the Harlem Blues and Jazz Band. He died of colon cancer on September 11, 2005.

During his career, Casey worked with Louis Armstrong, Chu Berry, Coleman Hawkins, Lionel Hampton, Billie Holiday, Billy Kyle, Frankie Newton, Clarence Profit, Art Tatum, and Teddy Wilson.

== Discography ==
=== As leader ===
- Buck Jumpin' (Swingville, 1960)
- The Al Casey Quartet (Moodsville, 1960)
- Jumpin' with Al: The Definitive Black & Blue Sessions (Black & Blue, 1974)
- Guitar Odyssey with Billy Butler (Jazz Odyssey, 1974)
- Six Swinging Strings (JSP, 1981)
- Best of Friends with Jay McShann (JSP, 1982)
- Genius of Jazz Guitar (JSP, 1983)
- Al Casey Remembers King Curtis (JSP, 1985)

=== As sideman ===
- Louis Armstrong, Pops (Phoenix 10, 1980)
- King Curtis, Live in New York (JSP, 2008)
- Neville Dickie, Shout for Joy (Southland, 1997)
- Wally Fawkes, October Song (Calligraph, 1986)
- Humphrey Lyttelton, Scatterbrains (Lake, 2003)
