= Joy Spring (Harold Mabern album) =

Live album by Harold Mabern
- Recorded: 1985
- Venues: Cafe des Copains, Toronto
- Genre: Jazz
- Label: Sackville

Harold Mabern chronology
Pisces Calling (1978)	Joy Spring (1985)	Straight Street (1989)

Joy Spring is a solo piano album by Harold Mabern. It was recorded in 1985 and released by Sackville Records.

== Recording and music ==
The album was recorded in concert at Cafe des Copains in Toronto in 1985, while pianist Harold Mabern was in residence there. The music was broadcast on the radio. Most of the tracks are jazz standards; two are Mabern originals; and one is Wayne Shorter's "House of Jade".

== Release and reception ==
Joy Spring was released by Sackville Records on LP. They reissued it, on CD, around 2006, with two tracks – "Indian Summer" and "Manhattan" – added. The JazzTimes reviewer commented that Mabern "builds vast musical architectures, founded on his powerful left hand and elaborated by his fleet, commanding right."

== Track listing ==
=== Original LP release ===
1. "I've Got the World on a String"
2. "Blues in F" / "T-Bone Steak"
3. "House of Jade"
4. "Joy Spring"
5. "Dat Dere"
6. "Pent Up House"
7. "Thou Swell"
8. "Mabern's Boogie"

=== CD reissue ===
1. "I've Got the World on a String"
2. "Blues in F" / "T-Bone Steak"
3. "House of Jade"
4. "Joy Spring"
5. "Indian Summer"
6. "Manhattan"
7. "Dat Dere"
8. "Pent Up House"
9. "Thou Swell"
10. "Mabern's Boogie"

== Personnel ==
- Harold Mabern – piano
