= Sonny Phillips =

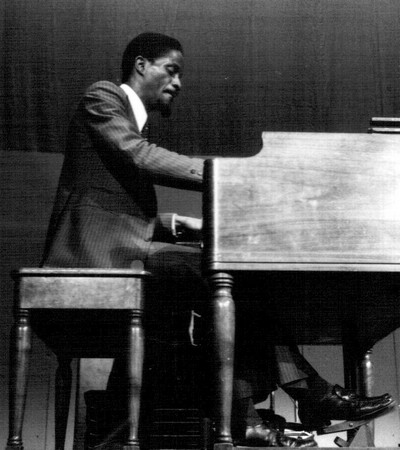
- Phillips in Paris, France, 1980.

Background information
- Born: December 7, 1936 (age 88); Mobile, Alabama; United States
- Genres: Jazz
- Occupation: Musician
- Instrument(s): Electronic organ, piano

Sonny Phillips (born December 7, 1936) is an American jazz keyboardist. His primary instrument is electronic organ but he often plays piano.

== Biography ==
Phillips began playing jazz organ after hearing Jimmy Smith in his twenties. He studied under Ahmad Jamal, and played in the 1960s and 1970s with Lou Donaldson, Nicky Hill, Eddie Harris, Houston Person, and Gene Ammons. His debut album was released in 1969, and he released several further records as a leader before suffering a long illness in 1980. He went into semi-retirement after this and moved to Los Angeles; since then he has performed and taught occasionally.

== Discography ==
=== As leader ===
- Sure 'Nuff (Prestige, 1969; reissued on BGP/Ace in 1993) -with Houston Person, Boogaloo Joe Jones
- Black Magic! (Prestige, 1970; reissued on BGP/Ace in 1993)
- Black on Black! (Prestige, 1970) -with Rusty Bryant, Melvin Sparks
- My Black Flower (Muse, 1976; reissued on 32 Jazz in 1999)
- I Concentrate On You (Muse, 1977)
- Legends Of Acid Jazz: Sonny Phillips (Prestige, 1997) (compilation of Sure 'Nuff + Black On Black!)

=== As sideman ===
With Gene Ammons

- The Boss Is Back! (Prestige, 1969)
- Brother Jug! (Prestige, 1969)
- Got My Own (Prestige, 1972)
- Big Bad Jug (Prestige, 1972)

With Rusty Bryant

- Rusty Bryant Returns (Prestige, 1969)

With Billy Butler

- Guitar Soul! (Prestige, 1969)
- Yesterday, Today & Tomorrow (Prestige, 1970)

With Eddie Harris

- Mean Greens (Atlantic, 1966)

With Willis Jackson

- In the Alley (Muse, 1976)

With Etta Jones

- If You Could See Me Now (Muse, 1978)
- Don't Misunderstand: Live In New York (High Note, 1980)

With Boogaloo Joe Jones

- Boogaloo Joe (Prestige, 1969)
- No Way! (Prestige, 1970)
- Black Whip (Prestige, 1973)

With Houston Person

- Goodness! (Prestige, 1969)
- Truth! (Prestige, 1970)
- Person to Person! (Prestige, 1970)
- The Real Thing (Eastbound, 1973)
- Stolen Sweets (Muse, 1976)
- Wild Flower (Muse, 1977)
- The Nearness of You (Muse, 1977)
- Suspicions (Muse, 1980)

With Bernard Purdie

- Coolin' 'N Groovin' (A Night At "On-Air") (Lexington/West 47th, 1993)
