= Sneak Preview! =

Studio album by Leon Spencer Jr.
- Released: 1971
- Recorded: December 7, 1970
- Studio: Van Gelder Studio, Englewood Cliffs, NJ
- Genre: Jazz
- Length: 35:31
- Label: Prestige; PR 10011
- Producer: Bob Porter

Leon Spencer, Jr. chronology
Sneak Preview! (1971)	Louisiana Slim (1971)

Sneak Preview! is the debut album by jazz organist Leon Spencer Jr. recorded for the Prestige label in 1970.

== Reception ==
Professional ratings
Review scores
Source	Rating
Allmusic	4/5 stars

The Allmusic site awarded the album 4 stars, stating: "Spencer's swinging solos on these mostly grooving tunes are quite appealing."

== Track listing ==
All compositions by Leon Spencer, Jr. except where noted

1. "The Slide" - 6:01
2. "Someday My Prince Will Come" (Frank Churchill, Larry Morey) - 6:30
3. "Message from the Meters" (Leo Nocentelli) - 6:40
4. "First Gravy" - 3:55
5. "5-10-15-20 (25-30 Years of Love)" (Tony Boyd, Archie Powell) - 4:25
6. "Sneak Preview" - 8:00

== Personnel ==
- Leon Spencer Jr. - organ
- Virgil Jones - trumpet
- Grover Washington Jr. - tenor saxophone
- Melvin Sparks - guitar
- Idris Muhammad - drums

=== Production ===
- Bob Porter - producer
- Rudy Van Gelder - engineer
