= Boogaloo Joe Jones =

- Born: Ivan Joseph Jones; November 1, 1940; West Virginia, United States
- Died: May 15, 2026 (aged 85) New Jersey, United States
- Genre: Jazz
- Occupation: Musician
- Instrument: Guitar
- Label: Prestige

Ivan Joseph Jones (November 1, 1940 - May 15, 2026), known professionally as Joe Jones or Boogaloo Joe Jones, was an American jazz guitarist.

== Discography ==
His song, Brown Bag, currently has 1 544 936 streams on Spotify as of 11 April 2024.

=== As leader ===
- Introducing the Psychedelic Soul Jazz Guitar of Joe Jones [AKA The Mindbender] (Prestige PR 7557, 1968; reissued on BGP/Ace in 1993)
- My Fire! More of the Psychedelic Soul Jazz Guitar of Joe Jones (Prestige PR 7613, 1968; reissued on BGP/Ace in 1993)
- Boogaloo Joe (Prestige PR 7697, 1969) -with Rusty Bryant, Sonny Phillips
- Right On Brother (Prestige PR 7766, 1970) -with Rusty Bryant, Charles Earland
- No Way! (Prestige PR 10004, 1971) -with Grover Washington Jr., Sonny Phillips, Butch Cornell
- What It Is (Prestige PR 10035, 1971) -with Grover Washington Jr., Butch Cornell
- Snake Rhythm Rock (Prestige PR 10056, 1973; reissued on BGP/Ace in 1992) -with Rusty Bryant, Butch Cornell
- Black Whip (Prestige PR 10072, 1973; reissued on BGP/Ace in 1992)
- Sweetback (Joka LPN 6007, 1976; reissued on Luv N' Haight/Ubiquity in 1995)
- Legends Of Acid Jazz: Boogaloo Joe Jones (Prestige, 1996) (compilation of Boogaloo Joe + Right On Brother)
- Legends Of Acid Jazz: Boogaloo Joe Jones, Vol. 2 (Prestige, 1998) (compilation of No Way! + What It Is)

=== As sideman ===
With Rusty Bryant

- Night Train Now! (Prestige PR 7735)

With Billy Hawks

- The New Genius of the Blues (Prestige PR 7501)

With Richard "Groove" Holmes

- Spicy! (Prestige PR 7493)

With Willis Jackson

- Gatorade (Prestige MPP 2516, 1971 [rel. 1982])
- The Gator Horn (Muse MR 5146, 1977)
- Lockin' Horns (Muse MR 5200, 1978 [rel. 1981])

With Harold Mabern

- Greasy Kid Stuff! (Prestige PR 7764)

With Houston Person

- Soul Dance! (Prestige PR 7621)

With Sonny Phillips

- Sure 'Nuff (Prestige PR 7737)
