= Rusty Bryant =

American jazz saxophonist (1929–91)

Royal Gordon "Rusty" Bryant (November 25, 1929 – March 25, 1991) was an American jazz tenor and alto saxophonist.

== Biography ==
Bryant was born in Huntington, West Virginia, and grew up in Columbus, Ohio, becoming a fixture of the local jazz scene. He worked with Tiny Grimes and Stomp Gordon before founding his own ensemble, the Carolyn Club Band, in 1951. He signed with Dot Records in 1954 and released several albums as a leader in the second half of the 1950s. In 1953, his live recording "All Nite Long" (a faster version of "Night Train") became a hit R&B single in the U.S.

Bryant's contract with Dot ended in 1957, and he returned to Columbus to do mostly local engagements, playing often with pianist-organist Hank Marr. Nancy Wilson also sang in his group. It was not until his appearance on the 1968 Groove Holmes album That Healin' Feelin' that he resurfaced beyond regional acclaim, and soon after he began leading dates for Prestige Records. He recorded extensively for the label from 1969 through the middle of the 1970s, being a sideman with Ivan "Boogaloo Joe" Jones, Johnny "Hammond" Smith, Charles Kynard, and Sonny Phillips; his 1970 release Soul Liberation was his most commercially successful, reaching No. 35 on the U.S. Black Albums chart and No. 15 on the Top Jazz Albums chart. Bryant continued to record into the early 1980s, then returned to mostly local dates in Columbus. He died there on March 25, 1991.

Though they resemble and share the same surname, Rusty Bryant and jazz pianist Ray Bryant are not related.

Rusty Bryant was the father of Eric Royal Bryant, Vince Bryant, the former bassist for the Austin, Texas, group Extreme Heat, and pop singer Stevie Woods, the latter having a moderately successful recording career in the early 1980s with the top 40 hit songs "Steal the Night" and "Just Can't Win 'Em All". Rusty was the grandfather of Tiana Woods, a Los Angeles based singer/songwriter and front woman for the band Living Eulogy.

== Discography ==
=== Original 7" vinyl (45rpm) releases ===
- Carolyn Records [credited to Rusty Bryant And The Carolyn Club Band]:
- 45-333 (1953) "Castle Rock" [matrix 1333] // "Nite Train" [matrix 1334]
- Dot Records [all credited to Rusty Bryant And The Carolyn Club Band]:
- 45-15134 (1954) "Castle Rock" [8222] reissue // "All Nite Long" [8223] reissue of "Nite Train" with new title.
- 45-15164 (5/54) "Pink Champagne" [8254] // "Slow Drag" [8255]
- 45-15221 (8/54) "Blow Rusty Blow" [8336] // "Merry Go Round" [8325]
- 45-1229 (?/54) "House Rocker" [8333] // "Danger Blues" [8337] with Jane Turner - vocal
- 45-15324 (1/55) "Back Street" [8487] // "Record Delivery Blues" [8489]
- 45-15376 (5/55) "Hot Fudge" [8659] // "Ridin' With Rusty" [8661]
- 45-15420 (9/55) "The Honeydripper" [8658] // "Moonlight Garden Stomp" [8660]
- 45-15449 (1/56) "I Need Somebody" [9018] with Evans Sisters - vocals // "Frankie And Johnny" [9032]
- 45-15476 (6/56) "Foot Stompin'" [8199] // "Don't Tell Me" [8200]
- 45-15483 (6/56) "All Nite Long" [8223] reissue // "Pink Champagne" [8254] reissue
- 45-15494 (8/56) "Honky Tonk, Part II" [9277] // "Lonely Cryin' Heart" [9278]
- 45-15541 (1/57) "Kittyhawk, Pt. 2" [9505] // "Little Hawk's Walk" [9506]
- Prestige Records [credited to Rusty Bryant]:
- 45-728 (1969) "Zoo Boogaloo, Pt. 1" // "Zoo Boogaloo, Pt. 2"
- 45-738 (1970) "Soul Liberation, Pt. 1" // "Soul Liberation, Pt. 2"
- 45-750 (1971) "Fire Eater" // "The Hooker"

=== LP/CD releases/compilations ===
- America's Greatest Jazz (Dot DLP-3006, 1956) [credited to Rusty Bryant And The Carolyn Club Band]
- Jazz Horizons: Rusty Bryant Plays Jazz (Dot DLP-3079, 1958)
- America's Greatest Jazz, Vol. II (Dot DLP-3353, 1961)
- Rusty Bryant Returns (Prestige, 1969)
- Night Train Now! (Prestige, 1969)
- Soul Liberation (Prestige, 1970)
- Fire Eater (Prestige, 1971) - with Wilbert Longmire
- Wild Fire (Prestige, 1971) - with Jimmy Ponder
- Friday Night Funk for Saturday Night Brothers (Prestige, 1972)
- For the Good Times (Prestige, 1973)
- Until It's Time for You to Go (Prestige, 1974)
- Rusty Rides Again (Phoenix Jazz, 1980; CD reissue: HighNote, 2001)
- Legends Of Acid Jazz: Rusty Bryant (Prestige, 1996) (compilation of Night Train Now! + Soul Liberation)
- Legends Of Acid Jazz: Rusty Bryant, Vol. 2 (Prestige, 1999) (compilation of Fire Eater + Wild Fire)
- For The Good Times (Prestige, 2002) (compilation of For The Good Times + Until It's Time For You To Go)
- Original Quintet Complete Recordings (Lone Hill Jazz, 2004) (compilation of Jazz Horizons: Rusty Bryant Plays Jazz + America's Greatest Jazz, Vol. II)
- The Chronological Rusty Bryant 1952-1954 (Classics 'Blues & Rhythm Series' 5182, 2007)
- America's Greatest Rock 'N' Roll (Carolyn Records 101, 20??) [credited to Rusty Bryant And The Carolyn Club Band] -note: includes all eleven singles [A & B sides] that Bryant released on Dot Records (from 1954-1956), plus "Hanka Boo" [an album only track].

=== As sideman ===
With Richard "Groove" Holmes

- That Healin' Feelin' (Prestige, 1968)

With Boogaloo Joe Jones

- Boogaloo Joe (Prestige, 1969)
- Right On Brother (Prestige, 1970)
- Snake Rhythm Rock (Prestige, 1972)

With Charles Kynard

- Wa-Tu-Wa-Zui (Beautiful People) (Prestige, 1970)

With Hank Marr

- Teentime: Latest Dance Steps (King, 1963)
- Live at the Club 502 (King, 1964)
- On and Off Stage (King, 1965)
- Sounds from the Marr-Ket Place (King, 1968)

With Jimmy McGriff

- The Starting Five (Milestone, 1987)

With Sonny Phillips

- Black on Black! (Prestige, 1970)

With Johnny "Hammond" Smith

- Soul Talk (Prestige, 1969)
- Black Feeling! (Prestige, 1969)
