= Prestige Records discography =

This is the discography for jazz record label Prestige Records. Not all original releases are included. Others are listed by the Jazz Discography Project. The earlier New Jazz/Prestige 78 rpm releases and the 100/200 (10-inch LP) series, (among others) are omitted. Prestige also released albums on several subsidiary labels including the New Jazz, Bluesville, Moodsville and Swingsville labels.

The Prestige Recordings or The Complete Prestige Recordings CD box sets have been released for Davis, Coltrane, Dolphy, Monk, Rollins, Gordon, and others.

== Discography ==
=== 7000 series (12" LPs) ===
Cat. #	Year	Artist	Title	Recording date	Notes
7001	1955	Billy Taylor	A Touch of Taylor	4/10/55	
7002	1955	Stan Getz	Stan Getz Quartets	6/21/49, 1/6/50, 4/14/50	
7003	1955	Milt Jackson	Milt Jackson Quartet	5/20/55	
7004	1955	Lee Konitz	Subconscious-Lee	1/11/49, 6/28/49, 9/27/49, 3/7/50	
7005	1955	Modern Jazz Quartet	Concorde	7/2/55	
7006	1955	Gerry Mulligan	Mulligan Plays Mulligan	8/27/51	
7007	1955	Miles Davis	The Musings of Miles	7/7/55	
7008	1955	Wardell Gray	Wardell Gray Memorial, Volume One	11/11/49, 4/25/50, 2/20/50	compilations
7009	1955	Wardell Gray	Wardell Gray Memorial, Volume Two	8/27/50, 1/21/52	compilations
7010	1955	Elmo Hope	Meditations	7/28/55	
7011	1955	James Moody	Hi Fi Party	8/23/55, 8/24/55	
7012	1956	Miles Davis with Sonny Rollins	Dig	10/5/51	
7013	1956	Various artists	Conception	6/21/49, 1/6/50, 3/15/50, 3/8/51, 10/5/51	VA compilation
7014	1956	Miles Davis Quintet	Miles	11/16/55	
7015	1956	Billy Taylor	Billy Taylor Trio Vol. 1	11/18/52, 12/10/52, 11/2/53	
7016	1956	Billy Taylor	Billy Taylor Trio Vol. 2	11/2/53, 12/29/53	
7017	1956	Art Farmer Quintet Featuring Gigi Gryce	Art Farmer Quintet featuring Gigi Gryce	10/21/55	
7018	1956	Phil Woods	Woodlore	11/25/55	
7019	1956	Sanford Gold	Piano d'or	summer 1955	
7020	1956	Sonny Rollins	Work Time	12/2/55	
7021	1956	Elmo Hope and Frank Foster	Hope Meets Foster	10/4/55	
7022	1956	Stan Getz	The Brothers	4/8/49, 9/8/52	
7023	1956	J. J. Johnson / Kai Winding / Bennie Green	Trombone by Three	5/26/49, 8/23/49, 10/5/51	VA compilation
7024	1956	Sonny Stitt with Bud Powell and J. J. Johnson	Sonny Stitt / Bud Powell / J.J. Johnson	10/17/49, 12/11/49, 1/26/50	
7025	1956	Miles Davis	Miles Davis and Horns	1/17/51, 2/19/53	
7026	1956	Zoot Sims	Zoot Sims Quartets	12/16/50, 8/14/51	
7027	1956	Thelonious Monk	Thelonious Monk Trio	10/15/52, 12/18/52, 9/22/54	
7028	1956	Teddy Charles	Collaboration West	8/21/53, 8/31/53	
7029	1956	Sonny Rollins	Sonny Rollins with the Modern Jazz Quartet	1/17/51, 12/17/51, 10/7/53	
7030	1956	Kai Winding, J. J. Johnson, Bennie Green	Kai and Jay, Bennie Green with Strings	5/13/52, 12/3/54	
7031	1956	The Art Farmer Septet	The Art Farmer Septet	7/2/53, 6/7/54	
7032	1956	George Wallington	Jazz for the Carriage Trade	1/20/56	
7033	1956	Jon Eardley	The Jon Eardley Seven	1/13/56	
7034	1956	Miles Davis and Milt Jackson	Quintet / Sextet	8/5/55	
7035	1956	Jackie McLean	Lights Out!	1/27/56	
7036	1956	James Moody	Wail, Moody, Wail	12/12/55	
7037	1956	Tadd Dameron	Fontainebleu	3/9/56	
7038	1956	Sonny Rollins	Sonny Rollins Plus 4	3/22/56	
7039	1956	Gene Ammons	The Happy Blues	8/23/56	
7040	1956	Gil Mellé	Primitive Modern	4/20/56, 6/1/56	
7041	1956	Bennie Green and Art Farmer	Bennie Green with Art Farmer	8/13/56	
7042	1956	Louis Thomas Hardin	Moondog	1956	
7043	1956	Elmo Hope	Informal Jazz	5/7/56	
7044	1956	Miles Davis	Collectors' Items	1/30/53, 3/16/56	
7045	1956	Earl Coleman	Earl Coleman Returns	3/2/56, 6/8/56	
7046	1956	Phil Woods	Pairing Off	6/15/56	
7047	1956	Sonny Rollins	Tenor Madness	5/24/56	
7048	1956	Jackie McLean	4, 5 and 6	7/13/56, 7/20/56	
7049	1956	Bennie Green	Walking Down	6/29/56	
7050	1956	Gene Ammons	All Star Sessions	3/5/50, 10/28/50, 1/31/51, 6/15/55	
7051	1956	Billy Taylor	The Billy Taylor Trio with Candido	9/7/54	
7052	1956	Bennie Green	Bennie Green Blows His Horn	6/10/55, 9/22/55	
7053	1956	Thelonious Monk	Monk	11/13/53, 5/11/54	
7054	1956	Miles Davis	Blue Haze	5/19/53, 3/15/54, 4/3/54	
7055	1956	Clifford Brown	Clifford Brown Memorial	6/11/53, 9/15/53	
7056	1956	James Moody	James Moody's Moods	9/29/54, 1/28/55, 12/12/55	
7057	1956	Modern Jazz Quartet	Django	6/25/53, 12/23/54, 1/9/55	
7058	1956	Sonny Rollins	Moving Out	8/8/54, 10/25/54	
7059	1956	Modern Jazz Quartet / Milt Jackson Quartet	M J Q	12/22/52, 6/16/54	VA compilation
7060	1956	Gene Ammons	Jammin' with Gene	7/13/56	
7061	1956	Hank Mobley	Mobley's Message	7/20/56	
7062	1956	Art Farmer and Donald Byrd	2 Trumpets	8/3/56	
7063	1956	Gil Mellé	Gil's Guests	8/10/56, 8/24/56	
7064	1956	Red Garland	A Garland of Red	8/17/56	
7065	1956	Barbara Lea	Barbara Lea	10/18/56, 10/19/56	
7066	1956	Bob Brookmeyer	The Dual Role of Bob Brookmeyer	1/6/54, 6/30/55	
7067	1956	Freddie Redd / Hampton Hawes	Piano East-West	12/52, 2/28/55	
7068	1956	Jackie McLean	Jackie's Pal	8/31/56	
7069	1956	Louis Thomas Hardin	More Moondog	1956	
7070	1957	Tadd Dameron	Mating Call	11/30/56	
7071	1957	Billy Taylor	Cross Section	5/7/53, 7/30/54	
7072	1957	James Moody	Moody	1/8/54, 4/12/54, 9/29/54	
7073	1957	Kenny Burrell	All Night Long	12/28/56	
7074	1957	Hank Mobley, Al Cohn, John Coltrane, Zoot Sims	Tenor Conclave	9/7/56	
7075	1957	Thelonious Monk and Sonny Rollins	Thelonious Monk and Sonny Rollins	11/13/53, 9/22/54, 10/25/54	
7076	1957	Miles Davis	Walkin'	4/3/54, 4/29/54	
7077	1957	Sonny Stitt	Kaleidoscope	2/17/50, 12/15/50, 1/31/51, 2/1/51, 2/25/52	
7078	1957	Teddy Charles	Evolution	8/31/53, 1/6/55	
7079	1957	Sonny Rollins	Saxophone Colossus	1/22/56	
7080	1957	Phil Woods and Donald Byrd	The Young Bloods	11/2/56	
7081	1957	Kenny Burrell	All Day Long	1/4/57	
7082	1957	Hank Mobley	Mobley's 2nd Message	7/27/56	
7083	1957	Gene Ammons	Funky	1/11/57	
7084	1957	Thad Jones	Olio	2/16/57	
7085	1957	Art Farmer and Gigi Gryce	When Farmer Met Gryce	5/19/54, 5/26/55	
7086	1957	Red Garland	Red Garland's Piano	12/14/56, 3/22/57	
7087	1957	Jackie McLean	Jackie McLean & Co.	2/8/57	
7088	1957	Kenny Burrell	Kenny Burrell	2/1/57	
7089	1957	Jimmy Raney	A	5/28/54, 2/18/55, 3/8/55	
7090	1957	Mal Waldron	Mal-1	11/9/56	
7091	1957	Mose Allison	Back Country Suite	3/7/57	
7092	1957	Donald Byrd, Art Farmer and Idrees Sulieman	Three Trumpets	1/26/57	
7093	1957	Billy Taylor	Billy Taylor Trio at Town Hall	12/17/54	
7094	1957	Miles Davis Quintet	Cookin' with the Miles Davis Quintet	10/26/56	
7095	1957	Sonny Rollins	Rollins Plays for Bird	10/15/56	
7096	1957	Ray Draper	Tuba Sounds	3/15/57	
7097	1957	Gil Mellé	Quadrama	4/26/57	
7098	1957	Ray Bryant	Ray Bryant Trio	4/5/57	
7099	1957	Louis Thomas Hardin	The Story of Moondog	1956–1957	
7100	1957	Barbara Lea	Lea in Love	4/19/57, 4/24/57, 4/26/57, 5/1/57	

=== 7100 series ===
Cat. #	Year	Artist	Title	Recording date	Notes
7101	1957	Herbie Mann and Bobby Jaspar	Flute Soufflé	3/21/57	
7102	1957	Kenny Burrell	Earthy	1/25/57	
7103	1957	Paul Quinichette	On the Sunny Side	5/10/57	
7104	1957	Teo Macero with the Prestige Jazz Quartet	Teo	4/27/57	
7105	1957	John Coltrane	Coltrane	5/31/57	
7106	1957	Webster Young	For Lady	6/14/57	
7107	1957	Curtis Fuller	New Trombone	5/11/57	
7108	1957	Teddy Charles	The Prestige Jazz Quartet	6/22/57, 6/28/57	
7109	1957	Miles Davis	Bags' Groove	6/29/54, 12/24/54	
7110	1957	Gene Ammons	Jammin' in Hi Fi with Gene Ammons	4/12/57	
7111	1957	Mal Waldron	Mal/2	4/19/57, 5/17/57	
7112	1957	Idrees Sulieman, Webster Young, John Coltrane, Bobby Jaspar	Interplay for 2 Trumpets and 2 Tenors	3/22/57	
7113	1957	Red Garland	Groovy	12/14/56, 5/24/57, 8/9/57	
7114	1957	Jackie McLean and John Jenkins	Alto Madness	5/3/57	
7115	1957	Phil Woods and Gene Quill	Phil & Quill with Prestige	3/29/57	
7116	1957	Phil Woods, Gene Quill, Sahib Shihab and Hal Stein	Four Altos	2/9/57	
7117	1957	Art Taylor	Taylor's Wailers	2/25/57, 3/22/57	
7118	1957	Thad Jones	After Hours	6/21/57	
7119	1957	Kenny Burrell and Jimmy Raney	2 Guitars	3/5/57	
7120	1958	Gil Evans	Gil Evans & Ten	9/6/57, 9/27/57, 10/10/57	
7121	1958	Mose Allison	Local Color	11/8/57	
7122	1958	Yusef Lateef	The Sounds of Yusef	10/11/57	
7123	1958	John Coltrane and Red Garland	John Coltrane with the Red Garland Trio	8/23/57	
7124	1958	Herbie Mann and Bobby Jaspar	Flute Flight	3/12/57, 3/21/57	
7125	1958	Steve Lacy	Soprano Sax	11/1/57	
7126	1958	Sonny Rollins	Tour de Force	12/7/56	
7127	1958	Paul Quinichette	For Basie	10/18/57	
7128	1958	King Pleasure / Annie Ross	King Pleasure Sings/Annie Ross Sings	10/9/52, 12/12/52, 9/29/53, 12/24/53, 12/7/54	
7129	1958	Miles Davis Quintet	Relaxin' with the Miles Davis Quintet	5/11/56, 10/26/56	
7130	1958	Red Garland	All Mornin' Long	11/15/57	
7131	1958	Frank Wess	Wheelin' & Dealin'	9/20/57	
7132	1958	Gene Ammons	The Big Sound	1/3/58	
7133	1958	Sonny Stitt	Stitt's Bits	2/17/50, 6/28/50, 10/8/50, 12/15/50	
7134	1958	Tommy Flanagan	Overseas	8/15/57	
7135	1958	Hal McKusick	Triple Exposure	12/27/57	
7136	1958	Herbie Mann	Mann in the Morning	10/10/56, 10/12/56, 10/16/56	
7137	1958	Mose Allison	Young Man Mose	1/24/58	
7138	1958	Tiny Grimes with Coleman Hawkins	Blues Groove	2/28/58	
7139	1958	Red Garland	Manteca	4/11/58	
7140	1958	Dorothy Ashby	Hip Harp	3/21/58	
7141	1958	Eddie "Lockjaw" Davis	The Eddie "Lockjaw" Davis Cookbook	6/20/58	
7142	1958	John Coltrane	Soultrane	2/7/58	
7143	1958	Shirley Scott	Great Scott!	5/27/58	
7144	1958	Tiny Grimes	Callin' the Blues	7/18/58	
7145	1958	Prestige Blues Swingers	Outskirts of Town	8/29/58	
7146	1958	Gene Ammons	Blue Gene	5/2/58	
7147	1958	Paul Quinichette	Basie Reunion	9/5/58	
7148	1959	Red Garland	All Kinds of Weather	11/27/58	
7149	1959	Coleman Hawkins	Soul	11/7/58	
7150	1959	Miles Davis	Miles Davis and the Modern Jazz Giants	12/24/54, 10/26/56	
7151	1959	Arnett Cobb and Eddie "Lockjaw" Davis	Blow Arnett, Blow	1/9/59	
7152	1959	Mose Allison	Creek Bank	8/15/58	
7153	1959	Hal Singer and Charlie Shavers	Blue Stompin'	2/20/59	
7154	1959	Eddie "Lockjaw" Davis with Shirley Scott	Jaws	9/12/58	
7155	1959	Shirley Scott	Scottie	10/23/58	
7156	1959	Coleman Hawkins	Hawk Eyes	4/3/59	
7157	1959	Red Garland	Red in Bluesville	4/17/59	
7158	1959	John Coltrane and Paul Quinichette	Cattin' with Coltrane and Quinichette	5/17/57	
7159	1959	Thelonious Monk	Monk's Moods		reissue of 7027
7160	1959	Bennie Green	Bennie Green Blows His Horn		reissue of 7052
7161	1959	Eddie "Lockjaw" Davis	The Eddie "Lockjaw" Davis Cookbook, Vol. 2	12/5/58	
7162	1959	Willis Jackson	Please Mr. Jackson	5/25/59	
7163	1959	Shirley Scott	Scottie Plays the Duke	4/24/59	
7164	1959	Bill Jennings	Enough Said!	8/21/59	
7165	1959	Arnett Cobb	Party Time	5/14/59	
7166	1959	Miles Davis	Workin' with the Miles Davis Quintet	5/11/56, 10/26/56	
7167	1959	Eddie "Lockjaw" Davis	Very Saxy	4/29/59	
7168	1959	Miles Davis	Early Miles 1951 & 1953		reissue of 7025
7169	1959	Thelonious Monk and Sonny Rollins	Work		reissue of 7075
7170	1959	Red Garland	Red Garland at the Prelude	10/2/59	
7171	1959	Eddie "Lockjaw" Davis and Shirley Scott	Jaws in Orbit	5/1/59	
7172	1960	Willis Jackson	Cool "Gator"	5/25/59, 11/9/59, 2/26/60	
7173	1960	Shirley Scott	Soul Searching	12/4/59, 12/20/59	
7174	1960	Jack McDuff with Bill Jennings	Brother Jack	1/25/60	
7175	1960	Arnett Cobb	More Party Time	2/16/60, 2/17/60	
7176	1960	Gene Ammons	The Twister	4/12/57	reissue of 7110
7177	1960	Bill Jennings	Glide On	1/12/60	
7178	1960	Eddie "Lockjaw" Davis and Shirley Scott	Bacalao	12/20/59	
7179	1960	James Moody	Moody's Workshop	1/8/54, 4/12/54, 9/29/54, 1/28/55	reissue of 7072
7180	1960	Gene Ammons	Boss Tenor	6/19/60	
7181	1960	Red Garland	Soul Junction	11/15/57	
7182	1960	Shirley Scott with the Latin Jazz Quintet	Mucho, Mucho	7/8/60	
7183	1960	Willis Jackson	Blue Gator	5/25/59, 11/9/59, 2/26/60, 8/16/60	
7184	1960	Arnett Cobb	Smooth Sailing	2/27/59	
7185	1960	Jack McDuff	Tough 'Duff	7/12/60	
7186	1960	Etta Jones	Don't Go to Strangers	6/21/60	
7187	1960	Betty Roche	Singin' & Swingin'	6/3/60	
7188	1960	John Coltrane	Lush Life	5/31/57, 8/16/57, 1/10/58	
7189	1960	Mose Allison	Autumn Song	2/13/59	
7190	1960	John Wright	South Side Soul	8/30/60	
7191	1961	Eddie "Lockjaw" Davis – Johnny Griffin Quintet	The Tenor Scene	1/6/61	
7192	1961	Gene Ammons	Jug	1/27/61	
7193	1961	Red Garland	Rojo	8/22/58	
7194	1961	Etta Jones	Something Nice	9/16/60, 3/30/61	
7195	1961	Shirley Scott	Shirley's Sounds	5/27/58	
7196	1961	Willis Jackson	Really Groovin'	1/10/61, 4/11/61	
7197	1961	John Wright	Nice 'n' Tasty	11/8/60	
7198	1961	Betty Roche	Lightly and Politely	6/3/60	
7199	1961	Jack McDuff	The Honeydripper	2/3/61	
7200	1961	Miles Davis	Steamin' with the Miles Davis Quintet	5/11/56, 10/26/56	

=== 7200 series ===
Cat. #	Year	Artist	Title	Recording date	Notes
7201	1961	Gene Ammons	Groove Blues	1/3/58	
7202	1961	Jimmy Forrest	Out of the Forrest	4/18/61	
7203	1961	Johnny "Hammond" Smith	Stimulation	2/14/61, 5/12/61	
7204	1961	Etta Jones and Strings	So Warm	6/9/61, 7/25/61, 7/28/61	
7205	1961	Shirley Scott	Hip Soul	6/2/61	
7206	1961	Eddie "Lockjaw" Davis Big Band	Trane Whistle	9/20/61	
7207	1961	Sonny Rollins	Sonny Boy	10/5/56, 12/7/56	
7208	1961	Gene Ammons	Up Tight!	10/17/61, 10/18/61	
7209	1961	Red Garland	High Pressure	11/15/57	
7210	1961	Roland Kirk with Jack McDuff	Kirk's Work	7/11/61	
7211	1961	Willis Jackson	Cookin' Sherry	11/9/59, 2/26/60, 8/16/60	
7212	1961	John Wright	Makin' Out	6/23/61	
7213	1961	John Coltrane	Settin' the Pace	3/26/58	
7214	1961	Etta Jones	From the Heart	2/8/62, 2/9/62	
7215	1961	Mose Allison	Ramblin' with Mose	4/18/58	
7216	1961	Arnett Cobb	Movin' Right Along	2/16/60	
7217	1961	Johnny "Hammond" Smith with Lem Winchester	Gettin' the Message	10/14/60	
7218	1961	Jimmy Forrest	Most Much!	10/19/60	
7219	1962	Eddie "Lockjaw" Davis	The Eddie "Lockjaw" Davis Cookbook Volume 3	9/12/58, 12/5/58	
7220	1962	Jack McDuff	Goodnight, It's Time to Go	7/14/61	
7221	1962	Miles Davis	The Beginning		reissue of 7007
7222	1962	King Curtis	Soul Meeting	9/18/60	
7223	1962	Oliver Nelson, King Curtis and Jimmy Forrest	Soul Battle	9/9/60	
7224	1962	Milt Jackson Quartet	Soul Pioneers		reissue of 7003
7225	1962	Oliver Nelson	Afro/American Sketches	9/29/61, 11/10/61	
7226	1962	Shirley Scott	Hip Twist	11/17/61	
7227	1962	Arnett Cobb	Sizzlin'	10/31/60	
7228	1962	Jack McDuff and Gene Ammons	Brother Jack Meets the Boss	1/23/62	
7229	1962	Red Garland Quintet with John Coltrane	Dig It!	3/22/57, 12/13/57, 2/7/58	
7230	1962	Honi Gordon	Honi Gordon Sings	3/23/62	
7231	1962	Frank Wess	Southern Comfort	3/22/62	
7232	1962	Willis Jackson	Thunderbird	3/31/62	
7233	1962	John Wright	Mr. Soul	4/10/62	
7234	1962	Gene Ammons and Sonny Stitt with Brother Jack McDuff	Soul Summit	2/19/62	
7235	1962	Jimmy Forrest	Sit Down and Relax with Jimmy Forrest	9/1/61	
7236	1962	Oliver Nelson with Joe Newman	Main Stem	8/25/61	
7237	1962	Larry Young	Groove Street	2/27/62	
7238	1962	Gene Ammons with Joe Newman and Jack McDuff	Twisting the Jug	11/28/61	
7239	1962	Johnny "Hammond" Smith with Willis Jackson	Johnny "Hammond" Cooks with Gator Tail	6/12/62	
7240	1962	Shirley Scott	Shirley Scott Plays Horace Silver	11/17/61	
7241	1962	Etta Jones	Lonely and Blue	4/6/62, 5/4/62	
7242	1962	Eddie "Lockjaw" Davis	Goin' to the Meeting	5/1/62	
7243	1962	John Coltrane	Standard Coltrane	7/11/58	
7244	1962	Sonny Stitt with Jack McDuff	Stitt Meets Brother Jack	2/16/62	
7245	1962	Thelonious Monk	Wee See		reissue of 7053
7246	1962	Sonny Rollins	Work Time		reissue of 7020
7247	1962	John Coltrane with Tadd Dameron	Mating Call		reissue of 7070
7248	1962	Sonny Stitt	All God's Children Got Rhythm		reissue of 7024
7249	1962	John Coltrane	Tenor Conclave		reissue of 7074
7250	1962	Lee Konitz with Lennie Tristano	Subconscious-Lee		reissue of 7004
7251	1962	Gerry Mulligan	Historically Speaking		reissue of 7006
7252	1963	Stan Getz	The Brothers		reissue of 7022
7253	1963	J. J. Johnson	Looking Back		reissue of 7023 and 7030
7254	1963	Miles Davis	The Original Quintet		reissue of 7014
7255	1963	Stan Getz	Early Stan	3/14/49, 4/23/53	
7256	1963	Stan Getz	Stan Getz Greatest Hits		reissue of 7002
7257	1963	Gene Ammons	Bad! Bossa Nova	9/9/62	
7258	1963	Red Garland	When There Are Grey Skies	10/9/62	
7259	1963	Brother Jack McDuff	Screamin'	10/23/62	
7260	1963	Willis Jackson	Bossa Nova Plus	10/30/62	
7261	1963	Eddie "Lockjaw" Davis	I Only Have Eyes for You	11/15/62	
7262	1963	Shirley Scott	Happy Talk	12/5/62	
7263	1963	Ted Curson	Ted Curson Plays Fire Down Below	12/10/62	
7264	1963	Willis Jackson	Neapolitan Nights	12/19/62	
7265	1963	Brother Jack McDuff	Somethin' Slick!	1/8/63	
7266	1963	Frank Wess	Yo Ho! Poor You, Little Me	1/24/63	
7267	1963	Shirley Scott with Stanley Turrentine	The Soul Is Willing	1/10/63	
7268	1963	John Coltrane	Stardust	7/11/58, 12/26/58	
7269	1963	Sonny Rollins	Sonny & The Stars		reissue of 7029
7270	1963	Gene Ammons	Preachin'	5/3/62	
7271	1963	Eddie "Lockjaw" Davis	Trackin'	11/15/62	
7272	1963	Etta Jones	Love Shout	11/28/62, 2/4/63, 2/12/63	
7273	1963	Willis Jackson	Loose...	3/26/63	
7274	1963	Brother Jack McDuff	Brother Jack McDuff Live!	6/5/63	
7274	1963	Gene Ammons / Etta Jones / Brother Jack McDuff	Soul Summit Vol. 2	6/13/61, 12/1/61, 1/23/62, 4/13/62	
7276	1963	Red Garland	Can't See for Lookin'	6/27/58	
7277	1963	Kenny Burrell	All Day Long		reissue of 7081
7278	1963	Frank Wess with Kenny Burrell	Steamin'		reissue of 7118
7279	1963	Mose Allison	Mose Allison Sings		selections from 7091, 7121, 7137, 7152, 7189, 7215
7280	1963	John Coltrane	Dakar	4/20/57	originally issued as part of PRLP 16-6
7281	1963	Miles Davis	Diggin' with the Miles Davis Sextet		reissue of 7012
7282	1963	Eddie "Lockjaw" Davis with Johnny Griffin	Battle Stations	9/2/62	
7283	1963	Shirley Scott	Satin Doll	3/7/61	
7284	1963	Etta Jones	Hollar!	9/16/60, 3/30/61, 11/28/62	
7285	1963	Willis Jackson	Grease 'n' Gravy	5/23/63	
7286	1964	Jack McDuff	Brother Jack at the Jazz Workshop Live!	10/3/63	
7287	1964	Gene Ammons	Late Hour Special	6/13/61, 4/13/62	
7288	1964	Red Garland	Halleloo-Y'-All	7/15/60	
7289	1964	Kenny Burrell	All Night Long		reissue of 7073
7290	1963?	Jimmy Witherspoon	Baby, Baby, Baby	5/6/63, 7/8/63	
7291	1964	Sonny Rollins	3 Giants!		reissue of 7038
7292	1964	John Coltrane	The Believer	1/10/58, 12/26/58	
7293	1963?	Booker Ervin	Exultation!	6/19/63	
7294	1963?	Eric Dolphy	Eric Dolphy at the Five Spot, Volume 2	7/16/61	
7295	1964	Booker Ervin	The Freedom Book	12/3/63	
7296	1964	Willis Jackson	The Good Life	5/23/63, 5/24/63	
7297	1964	Sonny Stitt with Jack McDuff	Soul Shack	9/17/63	
7298	1964	Various artists	Prestige Groovy Goodies		selections from 7274, 7299, 7283, 7290, 7152, 7285, 7192, 7297, 7081, 7293, 7012
7299	1964	Red Holloway	The Burner	8/27/63, 10/10/63	
7300	1964	Jimmy Witherspoon	Evenin' Blues	8/15/63	

=== 7300 series ===
Cat. #	Year	Artist	Title	Recording date	Notes
7301	1964	Eddie "Lockjaw" Davis with Shirley Scott	Smokin'	9/12/58	
7302	1964	Sonny Stitt	Primitivo Soul!	12/31/63	
7303	1964	Ronnie Mathews with Freddie Hubbard	Doin' the Thang!	12/17/63	
7304	1964	Eric Dolphy	Eric Dolphy in Europe, Vol. 1	9/8/61	
7305	1964	Shirley Scott	Drag 'em Out	5/27/63	
7306	1964	Gene Ammons	Biggest Soul Hits		selections from 7050, 7060, 7110, 7201, 7146, 7180, 7192
7307	1964	Red Garland	Soul Burnin'	7/15/60, 3/16/61	
7308	1964	Kenny Burrell	Blue Moods		reissue of 7088
7309	1964	Eddie "Lockjaw" Davis and Johnny Griffin	The First Set	1/6/61	
7310	1964	George Benson	The New Boss Guitar of George Benson	5/1/64	
7311	1964	Eric Dolphy	Outward Bound		reissue of New Jazz NJ 8236
7312	1964	Shirley Scott with Stanley Turrentine	Soul Shoutin'	10/15/63	
7313	1964	Various artists	Prestige Groovy Goodies, Vol. 2		selections from 7285, 7280, 7073, 7286, 7244, 7275, 7267, 7314, 7121, 7301, 7299
7314	1964	Jimmy Witherspoon	Blues Around the Clock	11/5/63	
7315	1964	Kenny Burrell	Soul Call	4/7/64	
7316	1964	John Coltrane	Black Pearls	5/23/58	
7317	1964	Willis Jackson	More Gravy	10/24/63	
7318	1964	Booker Ervin	The Song Book	2/27/64	
7319	1964	Yusef Lateef	Eastern Sounds	9/5/61	
7320	1964	Gene Ammons	Velvet Soul	6/17/60, 6/13/61, 9/5/62	
7321	1964	Eddie Chamblee	The Rocking Tenor Sax of Eddie Chamblee	2/27/64	
7322	1964	Miles Davis / John Coltrane	Miles Davis and John Coltrane Play Richard Rodgers		reissue of Moodsville 32
7323	1964	Jack McDuff with Benny Golson	The Dynamic Jack McDuff	2/6/64, 2/7/64, 4/23/64	
7324	1964	Joe Dukes with Brother Jack McDuff	The Soulful Drums of Joe Dukes	5/14/64	
7325	1964	Red Holloway with Jack McDuff	Cookin' Together	2/6/64	
7326	1964	Sonny Rollins	Saxophone Colossus		reissue of 7079
7327	1964	Jimmy Witherspoon	Blue Spoon	2/20/64	
7328	1964	Shirley Scott with Kenny Burrell	Travelin' Light	2/17/64	
7329	1964	Willis Jackson	Boss Shoutin'	1/9/64	
7330	1964	Eddie "Lockjaw" Davis with Johnny Griffin	The Midnight Show	1/6/61	
7331	1964	Don Patterson with Booker Ervin	The Exciting New Organ of Don Patterson	5/12/64	
7332	1964	Sonny Stitt with Don Patterson	Shangri-La	5/19/64	
7333	1964	Jack McDuff	Prelude	12/24/63	
7334	1965?	Eric Dolphy and Booker Little	Memorial Album: Live at the Five Spot	7/16/61	
7335	1964	Bobby Timmons	Little Barefoot Soul	6/18/64	
7336	1964	Montego Joe	Arriba! con Montego Joe	2/15/64	
7337	1964	Stan Getz	Stan Getz Greatest Hits		reissue of 7002
7338	1964	Shirley Scott and Stanley Turrentine	Blue Flames	3/31/64	
7339	1964	Gildo Mahones	The Great Gildo	2/4/63, 8/15/63, 9/3/63, 6/4/64	
7340	1964	Booker Ervin	The Blues Book	6/30/64	
7341	1964	John Coltrane / Kenny Burrell / Jackie McLean / Mal Waldron	Jazz Interplay		Double LP reissue of 7111 and 7112
7342	1964	Various artists	Hard Cookin'		Double LP reissue of 7117 and New Jazz 8219
7343	1964	Wardell Gray	Wardell Gray Memorial Album		Double LP reissue of 7008 and 7009
7344	1964	Art Farmer and Donald Byrd	Trumpets All Out		Double LP reissue of 7062 and 7092
7345	1964	Morris Nanton	Preface	8/14/64, 9/3/64	
7346	1965	Andy and the Bey Sisters	Now! Hear!	8/17/64, 8/20/64	
7347	1964	Kenny Burrell and Jack McDuff	Crash!	2/26/63	
7348	1965	Willis Jackson	Jackson's Action!	3/21/64	live
7349	1964	Don Patterson with Booker Ervin	Hip Cake Walk	5/12/64, 7/10/64	
7350	1965	Eric Dolphy	Eric Dolphy in Europe, Vol. 2	9/6/61, 9/8/61	
7351	1965	Bobby Timmons	Chun-King	8/12/64	
7352	1965	Miles Davis	Miles Davis Plays for Lovers		selections from 7054, 7076, 7007, 7014, 7200
7353	1965	John Coltrane	Bahia	7/11/58, 12/26/58	
7354	1965	Eddie Bonnemere	Jazz Oriented	9/10/64, 9/21/64	
7355	1965	Len and Judy	Folk Songs Sweet Bitter Sweet		
7356	1965	Jimmy Witherspoon	Some of My Best Friends Are the Blues	7/15-20/64	
7357	1965	Eddie "Lockjaw" Davis with Johnny Griffin and Junior Mance	The Late Show	1/6/61	
7358	1965	Carol Ventura	Carol!	7/64	
7359	1965	Charles McPherson	Bebop Revisited!	11/20/64	
7360	1965	Shirley Scott	Sweet Soul		reissue of 7262
7361	1965	Benny Golson	Stockholm Sojourn	7/15-20/64	
7362	1965	Jack McDuff	The Concert McDuff	7/64	
7363	1965	Thelonious Monk	The Golden Monk		reissue of 7053
7364	1965	Willis Jackson with Jack McDuff	Together Again!	5/25/59, 11/9/59, 2/26/60, 8/16/60	
7365	1965	Lucky Thompson	Lucky Strikes	9/15/64	
7366	1965	Eric Dolphy	Eric Dolphy in Europe / Volume 3	9/6/61, 9/8/61	
7367	1965	Chuck Wayne	Morning Mist	12/8/64	
7368	1965	Jesse Fuller	Jesse Fuller Favorites	5/13/63, 5/14/63	
7369	1965	Gene Ammons	Angel Eyes	6/17/60, 9/5/62	
7370	1965	Lightnin' Hopkins	My Life with the Blues	12/2/64	
7371	1965	Robert Kornfeld, Danny Kalb and Artie Rose	The Folk Stringers		
7372	1965	Sonny Stitt with Booker Ervin and Don Patterson	Soul People	8/25/64	
7373	1965	Miles Davis	Miles Davis Plays Jazz Classics		selections from 7094, 7129, 7150, 7200
7374	1965	Tom Rush	Blues, Songs & Ballads		
7375	1965	Pete Seeger, Peggy Seeger and Mike Seeger	Folk Songs With the Seegers		
7376	1965	Shirley Scott	Blue Seven	8/22/61	
7377	1965	Lightnin' Hopkins	Soul Blues	5/4/64, 5/5/64	
7378	1965	John Coltrane	The Last Trane	8/16/57, 1/10/58, 3/23/58	
7379	1965	A.K. Salim	Afro-Soul/Drum Orgy	10/8/64	
7380	1966?	Willis Jackson	Live! Action	3/21/64	
7381	1965	Don Patterson with Sonny Stitt and Booker Ervin	Patterson's People	3/19/64, 5/12/64, 7/10/64	
7382	1966?	Eric Dolphy	Here and There	4/1/60, 7/16/61, 9/8/61	
7383	1965	Terry Callier	The New Folk Sound of Terry Callier	1965	
7384	1965	Eric von Schmidt	Eric Sings von Schmidt		
7385	1965	Pat Bowie	Out of Sight!	10/23/64, 10/24/64, 10/27/64	
7386	1965	Booker Ervin	The Space Book	10/2/64	
7387	1965	Bobby Timmons	Workin' Out!	6/18/64, 10/21/64	
7388	1965	Homesick James	Blues on the South Side	1/7/64	
7389	1965	Billy Boy Arnold	More Blues on the South Side	12/30/63	
7390	1965	Red Holloway	Sax, Strings & Soul	8/64	
7391	1965	Otis Spann	The Blues Never Die!	11/21/64	blues
7392	1966?	Shirley Scott	Soul Sister	6/23/60	
7393	1965	Tracy Nelson	Deep Are the Roots		blues and country
7394	1965	Lucky Thompson	Lucky Thompson Plays Happy Days Are Here Again	2/16/65	
7395	1965	Freddie McCoy	Lonely Avenue	1/25/65, 2/16/65	
7396	1966?	Willis Jackson	Soul Night/Live!	3/21/64	live
7397	1965	Jaki Byard	Out Front!	3/14/61, 5/21/64, 5/28/64	
7398	1965	Yusef Lateef	The Sounds of Yusef		reissue of 7122
7399	1965	Roger Kellaway	The Roger Kellaway Trio	5/11-13/65	
7400	1965	Gene Ammons	Sock!	11/26/54, 11/4/55, 4/13/62, 9/5/62	

=== 7400 series ===
Cat. #	Year	Artist	Title	Recording date	Notes
7401	1965	Carmell Jones	Jay Hawk Talk	5/8/65	
7402	1965	Ali Akbar Khan	Traditional Music of India		
7403	1965	Ali Akbar Khan	The Soul of Indian Music		
7404	1965	Jack McDuff	Silk and Soul	7/64	
7405	1965	Carol Ventura	I Love to Sing!	6/65	
7406	1965	The Talismen	Folk Swingers Extraordinaire		
7407	1966	Eddie "Lockjaw" Davis with Johnny Griffin and Junior Mance	The Breakfast Show (Recorded Live at Mintons)		reissue of 7191
7408	1965	Johnny "Hammond" Smith	The Stinger	5/7/65	
7409	1965	Morris Nanton	Something We've Got	6/13/65, 6/15/65	
7410	1965	The Holy Modal Rounders	The Holy Modal Rounders 2		
7411	1965	Andy and the Bey Sisters	'Round Midnight	2/26/65, 5/27/65	
7412	1967	Willis Jackson	Tell It...	3/21/64	
7413	1965	Montego Joe	Wild & Warm	5/21/65	
7414	1965	Bobby Timmons	Holiday Soul	11/24/64	
7415	1965	Don Patterson	Holiday Soul	11/25/64	
7416	1965	Benji Aronoff	The Two Sides of Benji Aronoff		Released 1965, Recorded by Rudy Van Gelder
7417	1965	Booker Ervin	Groovin' High	12/3/63, 10/2/64	
7418	1965	Jimmy Witherspoon	Spoon in London	6/65	
7419	1965	Jaki Byard	Jaki Byard Quartet Live! Vol. 1	4/15/65	
7420	1966	Johnny "Hammond" Smith	Opus De Funk	2/14/61, 5/12/61	
7421	1965	Modern Jazz Quartet	The Modern Jazz Quartet Plays for Lovers		selections from 7059, 7057, 7005
7422	1966	Jack McDuff	Hot Barbeque	10/19/65	
7423	1965	Mose Allison	Down Home Piano		selections from 7121, 7215, 7152, 7189
7424	1967	Shirley Scott	Workin'	5/27/58, 4/8/60, 3/24/61	
7425	1965	Modern Jazz Quartet	The Modern Jazz Quartet Plays Jazz Classics		selections from 7059, 7057, 7005
7426	1966	John Coltrane	John Coltrane Plays for Lovers		selections from 7070, 7105, 7188, 7123, 7268
7427	1966	Charles McPherson	Con Alma!	8/4/65	
7428	1967	Willis Jackson and Brother Jack McDuff	Together Again, Again	5/25/59, 11/9/59, 2/26/60, 12/13/61	
7429	1966	Bobby Timmons	Chicken & Dumplin's	7/12/65	
7430	1966	Don Patterson	Satisfaction!	7/19/65	
7431	1966	James Moody	James Moody's Greatest Hits	10/7/49, 10/12/49	
7432	1966	Herbie Mann	The Best of Herbie Mann		selections from 7101, 7124
7433	1966	Sonny Rollins	Jazz Classics		reissue of 7058
7434	1966	Stan Getz	Jazz Classics		reissue of 7255
7435	1965	Richard "Groove" Holmes	Soul Message	8/3/65	
7436	1966	Sonny Stitt with Don Patterson	Night Crawler	9/21/65	
7437	1966	Pat Bowie and Charles McPherson	Feelin' Good	9/7/65, 9/9/65	
7438	1966	Mitch Greenhill	Shepherd of the Highway		
7439	1965	Sylvia Syms with Kenny Burrell	Sylvia Is!	8/11/65, 8/13/65	
7440	1967	Shirley Scott	Now's the Time	5/27/58, 10/23/58, 6/23/60, 8/22/61, 3/31/64	
7441	1966	James Moody	James Moody's Greatest Hits Volume 2	1/23/51, 1/24/51	
7442	1966	Eric Kloss	Introducing Eric Kloss	9/1/65	
7443	1966	Etta Jones	Etta Jones' Greatest Hits		selections from 7186, 7194, 7204, 7214, 7241, 7272, 7275, 7284
7444	1966	Freddie McCoy	Spider Man	10/6/65	
7445	1966	Gene Ammons	Boss Soul!	10/17/61, 10/18/61	
7446	1966	Mose Allison	Mose Allison Plays for Lovers		selections from 7091, 7137, 7215, 7152, 7189
7447	1966	Yusef Lateef	Yusef Lateef Plays for Lovers		selections from 7122, New Jazz 8218, 8234, 8272, Moodsville 22
7448	1966	Kenny Burrell	The Best of Kenny Burrell		selections from New Jazz 8317, 8318
7449	1966	Chet Baker	Smokin' with the Chet Baker Quintet	8/23-25/65	
7450	1966	Roland Kirk with Jack McDuff	Funk Underneath		reissue of 7210
7451	1966	The Holy Modal Rounders	The Holy Modal Rounders		reissue of Folklore FL 14031
7452	1966	Sonny Stitt and Jack McDuff	'Nother Fu'ther		reissue of 7244
7453	1966	Ramblin' Jack Elliott	Jack Elliott Sings the Songs of Woody Guthrie		reissue of Prestige International PR-INT 13016
7454	1966	Gene Ammons and Sonny Stitt with Jack McDuff	Soul Summit		reissue of 7234
7455	1966	Booker Ervin with Dexter Gordon	Setting the Pace	10/27/65	
7456	1967	Shirley Scott / Don Patterson / Eddie "Lockjaw" Davis	Stompin'	4/12/60, 3/24/61	
7457	1966	Miles Davis	Miles Davis' Greatest Hits		selections from 7012, 7054, 7076, 7109, 7129
7458	1966	Stan Hunter and Sonny Fortune	Trip on the Strip	10/28/65	
7459	1966	Sonny Stitt	Pow!	9/10/65	
7460	1966	Chet Baker	Groovin' with the Chet Baker Quintet	8/23-25/65	
7461	1966	Frank Foster	Fearless Frank Foster	12/2/65	
7462	1967	Booker Ervin	The Trance	10/27/65	
7463	1966	Jaki Byard	Freedom Together!	1/11/66	
7464	1966	Johnny "Hammond" Smith with Byrdie Green	The Stinger Meets the Golden Thrush	1/4/66	
7465	1966	Bobby Timmons	The Soul Man!	1/20/66	
7466	1966	Don Patterson with Sonny Stitt	The Boss Men	12/28/65	
7467	1967	Morris Nanton	Soul Fingers	5/13/65	
7468	1966	Richard "Groove" Holmes	Living Soul	4/22/66	
7469	1966	Eric Kloss with Don Patterson and Groove Holmes	Love and All That Jazz	3/14/66, 4/11/66	
7470	1966	Freddie McCoy	Funk Drops	6/21/66, 6/22/66	
7471	1966	Pucho & His Latin Soul Brothers	Tough!	2/15/66	
7472	1966	Larry & Hank	The Blues: A New Generation		
7473	1966	Red Holloway	Red Soul	12/65	
7474	1966	George Braith	Laughing Soul	3/1/66	
7475	1967	Jimmy Witherspoon	Blues for Easy Livers	1965–1966	
7476	1966	Jack McDuff	Walk On By	1965–1966	
7477	1967	Jaki Byard	Jaki Byard Quartet Live! Vol. 2	4/15/65	
7478	1967	Chet Baker	Comin' On with the Chet Baker Quintet	8/23-25/65	
7479	1966	Frank Foster	Soul Outing!	6/27/66, 7/11/66	
7480	1967	Charles McPherson	The Quintet / Live!	10/13/66	
7481	1967	Jack McDuff	Brother Jack McDuff's Greatest Hits		selections from 7174, 7185, 7199, 7220, 7274, 7265, 7286
7482	1967	Johnny "Hammond" Smith	Love Potion #9	9/28/66	
7483	1967	Bobby Timmons	Soul Food	9/30/66	
7484	1967	Don Patterson	Soul Happening!	8/5/66	
7485	1966	Richard "Groove" Holmes	Misty	8/3/65, 7/7/66, 8/12/66	
7486	1967	Eric Kloss	Grits & Gravy	12/21/66, 12/22/66	
7487	1967	Freddie McCoy	Peas 'n' Rice	10/6/65, 4/10/67, 5/4/67	
7488	1966	Don Friedman	Metamorphosis	2/22/66	
7489	1967	Sylvia Syms	For Once in My Life	3/9/67, 4/18/67	
7490	1966	Freddie Roach	The Freddie Roach Soul Book	6/13/66	
7491	1966	Houston Person	Underground Soul!	6/16/66	
7492	1967	Jack McDuff	Hallelujah Time!	6/5/63, 1965–1966	
7493	1967	Richard "Groove" Holmes	Spicy!	11/28/66	
7494	1967	Johnny "Hammond" Smith	Gettin' Up	3/3/67	
7495	1967	Gene Ammons	Gene Ammons Live! in Chicago	8/61	Reissue of Argo LP 698 licensed from Argo
7496	1967	Chet Baker	Cool Burnin' with the Chet Baker Quintet	8/23-25/65	
7497	1967	Richard "Groove" Holmes	Super Soul	4/26/67, 4/27/67	
7498	1967	Barry Harris	Luminescence!	4/20/67	
7499	1967	Booker Ervin	Heavy!!!	9/9/66	
7500	1967	Jackie McLean	Strange Blues	2/15/57, 7/12/57, 8/30/57	

=== 7500 series ===
Cat. #	Artist	Title	Recording date	Notes
7501	Billy Hawks	The New Genius of the Blues	11/15/66	
7502	Pucho & His Latin Soul Brothers	Saffron and Soul	11/8-10/66	
7503	Byrdie Green	The Golden Thrush Strikes!	7/6/66	
7504	Shinichi Yuize	The Artistry of Japan		
7505	Shinichi Yuize	The Romance of Japan		
7506	Eddie Daniels	First Prize!	9/8/66, 9/12/66	
7507	Freddie Roach	Mocha Motion!	1/5/67	
7508	Thelonious Monk	The High Priest		reissue of 7027
7509	Byrdie Green	I Got It Bad (and That Ain't Good)	4/20/67	
7510	Don Patterson	Mellow Soul	5/10/67	
7511	Sonny Criss	This is Criss!	10/21/66	
7512	Chet Baker	Boppin' with the Chet Baker Quintet	8/23-25/65	
7513	Pat Martino	El Hombre	5/1/67	
7514	Richard "Groove" Holmes	Get Up & Get It!	5/29/67	
7515	George Braith	Musart	11/21/66, 1/3/67	
7516	Stan Getz with Al Haig	Prezervation	6/21/49, 7/28/49, 2/27/50	
7517	Houston Person	Chocomotive	6/14/67	
7518	Teddy Edwards	Nothin' But the Truth!	12/13/66	
7519	Cedar Walton	Cedar!	7/10/67	
7520	Eric Kloss	First Class Kloss!	7/14/67	
7521	Freddie Roach	My People (Soul People)	6/22/67, 6/28/67	
7522	Teddy Edwards	It's All Right!	5/24/67, 5/27/67	
7523	Trudy Pitts	Introducing the Fabulous Trudy Pitts	2/15/67, 2/21/67	
7524	Jaki Byard	On the Spot!	4/15/65	
7525	Buddy Terry	Electric Soul!	2/23/67	
7526	Sonny Criss	Portrait of Sonny Criss	3/23/67	
7527	Dave Van Ronk	Folk Singer		Reissue of Folklore FL 14012
7528	Pucho & His Latin Soul Brothers	Shuckin' and Jivin'	8/9/67	
7529	Brother Jack McDuff	The Midnight Sun	6/5/63, 7/64, 2/66	
7530	Sonny Criss	Up, Up and Away	8/18/67	
7531	John Coltrane	Soultrane		reissue of 7142
7532	Kenny Burrell with John Coltrane	The Kenny Burrell Quintet with John Coltrane		reissue of New Jazz NJ 8276
7533	Don Patterson	Four Dimensions	8/25/67	
7534	Gene Ammons	Boss Tenor		reissue of 7180
7535	Eric Kloss	Life Force	9/18/67	
7536	Tom Rush	Got a Mind to Rumble		
7537	Ravi Shankar and Ali Akbar Khan	The Master Musicians of India	1959	reissue of Bluesville BV 1078
7538	Trudy Pitts	These Blues of Mine	9/21/67, 9/25/67	
7539	Various artists	Take a Trip with Me: Psychedelic Hits		
7540	Miles Davis	Odyssey		reissue of 7034
7541	Buddy Terry	Natural Soul	11/15/67	
7542	Freddie McCoy	Beans & Greens	10/2/67, 10/4/67	
7543	Richard "Groove" Holmes	Soul Power!	12/19/67	
7544	Ali Akbar Khan	The Classical Music of India		reissue of Bluesville BR 1079
7545	Ali Akbar Khan	Traditional Music of India		reissue of 7402
7546	Ali Akbar Khan	The Soul of Indian Music		reissue of 7402
7547	Pat Martino	Strings!	10/2/67	
7548	Houston Person	Trust in Me	10/13/67	
7549	Johnny "Hammond" Smith	Soul Flowers	9/27/67	
7550	Jaki Byard	Sunshine of My Soul	10/31/67	
7551	Willis Jackson	Soul Grabber	10/20/67, 10/25/67	
7552	Gene Ammons	Jungle Soul		reissue of 7257
7553	Sonny Rollins	Rollins Plays for Bird		reissue of 7095
7554	James Moody	James Moody's Moods		reissue of 7056
7555	Pucho & His Latin Soul Brothers	Big Stick	12/5/67	
7556	Billy Hawks	More Heavy Soul!	12/6/67	
7557	Joe Jones	Introducing the Psychedelic Soul Jazz Guitar of Joe Jones	3/15/67, 12/12/67	
7558	Sonny Criss	The Beat Goes On!	12/22/67	
7559	Charles McPherson	From This Moment On!	1/31/68	
7560	Trudy Pitts	A Bucketful of Soul	12/20/67, 2/8/68	
7561	Freddie McCoy	Soul Yogi	1/24/68, 2/5/68	
7562	Pat Martino	East!	1/8/68	
7563	Don Patterson	Boppin' & Burnin'	2/22/68	
7564	Johnny "Hammond" Smith	Dirty Grape	1/31/68	
7565	Eric Kloss	We're Goin' Up	12/22/67	
7566	Houston Person	Blue Odyssey	3/12/68	
7567	Brother Jack McDuff	Soul Circle	7/64, 1965, 2/66	
7568	Harold Mabern	A Few Miles from Memphis	3/11/68	
7569	Wally Richardson	Soul Guru	2/5/68, 2/7/68	
7570	Richard "Groove" Holmes	The Groover!	2/14/68	
7571	Willis Jackson	Star Bag	3/22/68	
7572	Pucho & His Latin Soul Brothers	Heat!	4/23/68	
7573	Jaki Byard	Jaki Byard with Strings!	4/2/68	
7574	Byrdie Green	Sister Byrdie!	3/22/68	
7575	Illinois Jacquet	Bottoms Up	3/26/68	
7576	Sonny Criss	Sonny's Dream (Birth of the New Cool)	5/8/68	
7577	Don Patterson	Opus de Don	6/5/68	
7578	Kenny Burrell	Out of This World		reissue of Moodsville MV 29
7579	Eric Dolphy with Booker Ervin and Mal Waldrom	The Quest		reissue of New Jazz NJ 8269
7580	The Miles Davis Quintet	Steamin'		reissue of 7200
7581	John Coltrane	Lush Life		reissue of 7188
7582	Freddie McCoy	Listen Here	6/10/68	
7583	Trudy Pitts	The Excitement of Trudy Pitts	5/24/68	
7584	Walter "Foots" Thomas	Walter Foots Thomas All-Stars	4/1/44, 10/11/44, 3/8/45, 6/27/45	
7585	Sonny Stitt	Stitt's Bits Vol. 1	2/17/50, 6/28/50, 10/8/50, 1/31/51	selections from 7077, 7133
7586	King Pleasure	Original Moody's Mood	2/19/52, 12/12/52, 12/24/53, 12/7/54	
7587	George Wallington	The George Wallington Trios	9/4/52, 5/25/53	
7588	Johnny "Hammond" Smith	Nasty!	6/18/68	
7589	Pat Martino	Baiyina (The Clear Evidence)	6/11/68	
7590	Duke Edwards and the Young Ones	Is It Too Late?	4/29/68, 4/30/68	
7591	Cedar Walton	Spectrum	5/24/68	
7592	Lightnin' Hopkins	Greatest Hits!		reissue of Bluesville BV 1084
7593	Dicky Wells	Dicky Wells in Paris, 1937	7/7/37, 7/12/37	
7594	Eric Kloss	Sky Shadows	8/13/68	
7595	Oscar Peterson	Soul-O!	4/68	reissue of My Favorite Instrument, MPS 15181
7596	Brother Jack McDuff	Brother Jack McDuff Plays for Beautiful People		selections from 7174, 7185, 7199, 7259, 7265, 7347
7597	Illinois Jacquet	The King!	8/20/68	
7598	Don Byas	Don Byas in Paris	10/18/46, 12/4/46, 1/5/49	
7599	Charles Kynard	Professor Soul	8/6/68	
7600	Barry Harris	Bull's Eye!	6/4/68	

=== 7600 series ===
Cat. #	Artist	Title	Recording date	Notes
7601	Richard "Groove" Holmes	That Healin' Feelin'	8/26/68	
7602	Willis Jackson	Swivelhips	9/9/68	
7603	Charles McPherson	Horizons	8/27/68	
7604	Benny Carter	Swing 1946	8/23/46, 9/4/46, 9/6/46	
7605	Kenny Clarke with James Moody	The Paris Bebop Sessions	3/2/48, 5/14/48, 10/9/50	
7606	Gene Ammons and Sonny Stitt	We'll Be Together Again	8/26/61	reissue of Argo LP 697
7607	Don Ellis	New Ideas		reissue of New Jazz NJ 8257
7608	Miles Davis	Walkin'		reissue of 7076
7609	John Coltrane	The First Trane		reissue of 7105
7610	Sonny Criss	Rockin' in Rthythm	7/2/68	
7611	Eric Dolphy	Eric Dolphy at the Five Spot, Vol. 1		reissue of New Jazz NJ 8260
7612	Sonny Stitt	Stitt's Bits Vol. 2	1/31/51, 2/1/51, 8/14/51, 2/25/52	selections from 7077, 7133
7613	Don Patterson	Funk You!	9/24/68	
7614	Quintet of the Hot Club of France	First Recordings	12/34, 3/35	
7615	Jaki Byard	The Jaki Byard Experience	9/17/68	
7616	Pucho & His Latin Soul Brothers	Dateline	2/11/69	
7617	Joe Jones	My Fire!	10/21/68	
7618	Cedar Walton	The Electric Boogaloo Song	1/14/69	
7619	Eddie Jefferson	Body and Soul	9/27/68	
7620	Oscar Peterson	The Great Oscar Peterson on Prestige!	4/68	reissue of The Way I Really Play, MPS 15180
7621	Houston Person	Soul Dance!	11/18/68	
7622	Billy Butler	This Is Billy Butler!	12/16/68	
7623	Dexter Gordon	The Tower of Power!	4/2/69	
7624	Harold Mabern	Rakin' and Scrapin'	12/23/68	
7625	James Moody	Don't Look Away Now!	2/14/69	
7626	Rusty Bryant	Rusty Bryant Returns	2/17/69	
7627	Eric Kloss	In the Land of the Giants	1/2/69	
7628	Sonny Criss	I'll Catch the Sun!	1/20/69	
7629	Illinois Jacquet	The Soul Explosion	3/25/69	
7630	Charles Kynard	The Soul Brotherhood	3/10/69	
7631	Stuff Smith	The Violin Summit	9/30/66	reissue of SABA SB 15 099
7632	Tommy Flanagan	Overseas		reissue of 7134
7633	Django Reinhardt	Django Reinhardt and the American Jazz Giants	3/2/35, 11/25/35, 4/28/37, 1/24/38	
7634	Clarke-Boland Big Band	Fire, Soul, Heat & Guts!	6/18/67	reissue of Sax No End, SABA 15 138
7635	Sonny Stitt	Soul Electricity!	9/23/68	
7636	Maynard Ferguson	Maynard Ferguson 1969	4/68	reissue of Trumpet Rhapsody, MPS 15 166
7637	Yusef Lateef	Into Something		reissue of 8272
7638	Dorothy Ashby	The Best of Dorothy Ashby		reissue of 7140
7639	Dorothy Ashby	Dorothy Ashby Plays for Beautiful People		reissue of New Jazz NJ 8209
7640	Don Patterson	Oh Happy Day	6/2/69	
7641	Chubby Jackson	Chubby Jackson Sextet and Big Band	5/22/47, 3/15/50	
7642	Brother Jack McDuff	I Got a Woman	1965–66	
7643	Benny Carter	Benny Carter 1933	3/14/33, 10/10/33, 10/16/33	
7644	Benny Goodman	Benny Goodman and the Giants of Swing	10/2/33, 10/18/33, 10/27/33, 11/19/35	
7645	Duke Ellington	The Big Bands 1933	2/15-16/33, 9/22/33, 10/3/33	
7646	Joe Sullivan	Swing Classics 1935	9/26/33, 11/2/35, 11/16/35, 12/13/35	
7647	Coleman Hawkins	Jazz Pioneers 1933–36	9/29/33, 3/8/34, 11/18/34, 3/7/36, 3/11/36, 4/9/36	
7648	Willis Jackson	Gator's Groove	11/11/68	
7649	Oscar Peterson	Oscar Peterson Plays for Lovers	11/66, 11/67	reissue of Girl Talk, MPS 15179
7650	Miles Davis	Miles Davis and the Modern Jazz Giants		selections from 7150, 7109
7651	John Coltrane	Traneing In		reissue of 7123
7652	Eric Dolphy	Out There		reissue of New Jazz NJ 8252
7653	Yusef Lateef	Expression!		reissue of New Jazz NJ 8218
7654	Gene Ammons	The Happy Blues		reissue of 7039
7655	Milt Jackson with Horace Silver	The Complete Milt Jackson with Horace Silver		selections from 7059, 7003
7656	Thelonious Monk	The Genius of Thelonious Monk		reissue of 7075
7657	Sonny Rollins	Tenor Madness	5/24/56	reissue of 7047
7658	Red Garland	Red Garland Revisited!	5/14/57	
7659	Herbie Mann	Herbie Mann in Sweden		reissue of 7136
7660	Eddie "Lockjaw" Davis	In the Kitchen		reissue of 7141
7661	Hank Mobley	Hank Mobley's Message		reissue of 7061
7662	Clifford Brown	Clifford Brown Memorial Album		reissue of 7055
7663	James Moody	Workshop Vol. 1		selections from 7072, 7056
7664	Billy Taylor	A Touch of Taylor		reissue of 7001
7665	Art Farmer	Early Art		reissue of New Jazz NJ 8258
7666	Brother Jack McDuff	Steppin' Out	7/6/61, 2/26/63, 2/66	
7667	Hank Mobley	Mobley's 2nd Message		reissue of 7082
7668	Milt Buckner	Milt Buckner in Europe	11/16/66	reissue of Play Chords, SABA 15 110
7669	Carmell Jones	Carmell Jones in Europe	9/1/65, 1966	compiled from Nathan Davis The Hip Walk (MPS) and Annie Ross & Pony Poindexter (SABA)
7670	John Coltrane and Hank Mobley	2 Tenors		reissue of 7043
7671	Coleman Hawkins	Night Hawk		reissue of Swingville SV 2016
7672	Pee Wee Russell	Pee Wee Russell Memorial Album		reissue of Swingville SV 2008
7673	Phil Woods	Early Quintets	8/11/54, 3/3/59	
7674	Miles Davis	Early Miles		reissue of 7025 plus one alternate take
7675	Elmo Hope	Elmo Hope Memorial Album		reissue of 7010
7676	Jean-Luc Ponty	Critic's Choice	6/67	reissue of Sunday Walk, SABA 15 139
7677	Pepper Adams	Encounter!	12/12/68	
7678	Houston Person	Goodness!	8/25/69	
7679	Pucho & His Latin Soul Brothers	The Best of Pucho and the Latin Soul Brothers		selections from 7528, 7555, 7572
7680	Dexter Gordon	More Power!	4/2/69	
7681	Johnny "Hammond" Smith	Soul Talk	5/19/69	
7682	Norman Mailer	Norman Mailer Reads Norman Mailer		
7683	Larry Storch	Larry Storch Reads Philip Roth's Epstein		
7684	Lee Konitz, Phil Woods, Pony Poindexter, Leo Wright	Alto Summit	6/2-3/68	reissue of MPS 15192
7685	Ella Fitzgerald	Sunshine of Your Love	10/1968	reissue of MPS 15250
7686	Jaki Byard	Solo Piano	7/31/69	
7687	Harold Mabern	Workin' & Wailin'	6/30/69	
7688	Charles Kynard	Reelin' with the Feelin'	8/11/69	
7689	Eric Kloss	To Hear Is to See!	7/22/69	
7690	Oscar Peterson	Easy Walker!	5/64	reissue of Action, MPS 15178
7691	Stuff Smith	Stuff Smith Memorial Album	4/67	reissue of Black Violin, SABA 15 147
7692	Don Byas and Ben Webster	Don Byas Meets Ben Webster	2/1-2/68	reissue of SABA 15 159
7693	Cedar Walton	Soul Cycle	7/25/69	
7694	Steve Kuhn	Steve Kuhn in Europe	6/4/68	reissue of Watch What Happens!, MPS 15 193
7695	Hampton Hawes	Hampton Hawes in Europe	11/8/67	reissue of Hamp's Piano, SABA 15 149
7696	Teddy Wilson	The Teddy Wilson Trio in Europe; 1968	11/68	reissue of The Noble Art of Teddy Wilson, Metronome 15328
7697	Joe Jones	Boogaloo Joe	8/4/69	
7698	Eddie Jefferson	Come Along with Me	8/12/69	
7699	Clarke-Boland Big Band	Let's Face the Music	5/13-14/68	Original release on MPS 15214 - All Smiles
7700	Richard "Groove" Holmes	The Best of Richard "Groove" Holmes		selections from 7435, 7468, 7485, 7493, 7497, 7514, 7543

=== 7700 series ===
Cat. #	Artist	Title	Recording date	Notes
7701	Sonny Stitt and Brother Jack McDuff	The Best of Sonny Stitt with Brother Jack McDuff		selections from 7244, 7297
7702	Brother Jack McDuff	The Best of Brother Jack McDuff Live		selections from 7274, 7286, 7362
7703	Willis Jackson and Brother Jack McDuff	The Best of Willis Jackson with Brother Jack McDuff		selections from 7183, 7162, 7428, 7172, 7364, 7211
7704	Don Patterson	The Best of Don Patterson		selections from 7381, 7331, 7349, 7466, 7430, 7484, 7510, 7533
7705	Johnny "Hammond" Smith	The Best of Johnny "Hammond" Smith		selections from 7203, 7239, 7408, 7464, 7482, 7494, 7564, 7549
7706	Freddie McCoy	The Best of Freddie McCoy		selections from 7395, 7444, 7487, 7542, 7561, 7582
7707	Shirley Scott and Stanley Turrentine	The Best of Shirley Scott with Stanley Turrentine		selections from 7205, 7226, 7267, 7312, 7338
7708	Gene Ammons	The Best of Gene Ammons		selections from 7180, 7369, 7192, 7445, 7238, 7369, 7400
7709	King Curtis	The Best of King Curtis	4/25/61, 7/11/61, 9/19/61, 9/22/61, 1/5/62, 2/15/62	
7710	Eddie "Lockjaw" Davis with Shirley Scott	The Best of Eddie "Lockjaw" Davis with Shirley Scott		selections from 7219, 7161, 7301, 7167, 7171
7711	Arnett Cobb	The Best of Arnett Cobb		selections from 7184, 7165, 7175, 7216, 7227
7712	Jimmy Forrest	The Best of Jimmy Forrest		selections from 7223, 7202, 7235, 7218, 8293
7713	Jimmy Witherspoon	The Best of Jimmy Witherspoon		selections from 7290, 7300, 7314, 7327
7714	Lightnin' Hopkins	The Best of Lightnin' Hopkins		selections from Bluesville BV 1061, 1070
7715	Sonny Terry and Brownie McGhee	The Best of Sonny Terry and Brownie McGhee		selections from Bluesville BV 1020, 1033, 1042, 1058
7716	Dave Van Ronk	Inside Dave Van Ronk		reissue of Folklore FL 14025
7717	Eric von Schmidt	The Folk Blues		reissue of Folklore FL 14005
7718	Jesse Fuller	San Francisco Bay Blues		reissue of Folklore FL 14006
7719	Otis Spann	The Blues Never Die!		reissue of 7391
7720	The Holy Modal Rounders	The Holy Modal Rounders Vol. 1		reissue of Folklore FL 14031
7721	Ramblin' Jack Elliott	Ramblin' Jack Elliott		reissue of Folklore FL 14024
7722	Roosevelt Sykes	The Honeydripper		reissue of Bluesville BV 1014
7723	Sunnyland Slim	Slim's Shout		reissue of Bluesville BV 1016
7724	Lonnie Johnson	Losing Game		reissue of Bluesville BV 1024
7725	Reverend Gary Davis	The Blues Guitar and Banjo of Rev. Gary Davis		reissue of Folklore FL 14033
7726	Tracy Nelson	Deep are the Roots		reissue of 7393
7727	Geoff Muldaur	Sleepy Man Blues		reissue of Folklore FL 14004
7728	Rex Stewart	Rex Stewart Memorial Album		reissue of Swingville SV 2006
7729	Duke Pearson	Dedication!	8/2/61	
7730	Walter Bishop, Jr.	The Walter Bishop Jr. Trio / 1965	1962–63	
7731	Illinois Jacquet	The Blues; That's Me!	9/16/69	
7732	Tal Farlow	The Return of Tal Farlow	9/23/69	
7733	Barry Harris	Magnificent!	11/25/69	
7734	Billy Butler	Guitar Soul!	9/22/69	
7735	Rusty Bryant	Night Train Now!	10/6/69	
7736	Johnny "Hammond" Smith	Black Feeling!	12/22/69	
7737	Sonny Phillips	Sure 'Nuff	10/20/69	
7738	Don Patterson with Sonny Stitt	Brothers-4	9/15/69	
7739	Gene Ammons	The Boss Is Back!	11/10/69, 11/11/69	
7740	James Moody	Hi-Fi Party, Vol. 2	8/23/55, 8/24/55	Reissue of 7011 with one unreleased track
7741	Richard "Groove" Holmes	Soul Mist!	3/15/66, 7/7/66	
7742	Sonny Criss	Hits of the '60s		selections from 7526, 7530, 7558, 7610
7743	Charles McPherson	McPherson's Mood	8/23/69	
7744	Miles Davis	Conception		selections from 7012, 7013
7745	Tadd Dameron with John Coltrane	Mating Call		reissue of 7070
7746	John Coltrane	Trane's Reign		reissue of 7213
7747	Eric Dolphy	Far Cry!		reissue of New Jazz NJ 8270
7748	Yusef Lateef	Cry! - Tender		reissue of New Jazz NJ 8234
7749	Modern Jazz Quartet	First Recordings		selections from 7059, 7057
7750	Sonny Rollins	Work Time		reissue of 7020
7751	Thelonious Monk	Reflections, Vol. 1		selections from 7027, 7053
7752	Red Garland	The P.C. Blues	3/22/57, 8/9/57	
7753	Coleman Hawkins with Tiny Grimes and Ray Bryant	Blues Groove		reissue of 7138
7754	Kenny Dorham	Kenny Dorham 1959		reissue of New Jazz NJ 8225
7755	Henry Red Allen	Henry Red Allen Memorial Album		reissue of Swingville SV 2034
7756	Gil Evans	Big Stuff		reissue of 7120
7757	Jackie McLean	Lights Out!		reissue of 7035
7758	Charles Earland	Black Talk!	12/15/69	
7759	Sonny Stitt	Night Letter	10/27/69	
7760	Clarke-Boland Big Band	Latin Kaleidoscope	8/28-29/68	Originally released on MPS Records
7761	Clifford Brown	The Clifford Brown Quartet in Paris	10/15/53	
7762	Billy Taylor	Billy Taylor Today!	4/69	Originally released on MPS Records as Sleeping Bee
7763	Dexter Gordon	A Day in Copenhagen	3/10/69	Originally released on MPS Records
7764	Harold Mabern	Greasy Kid Stuff!	1/26/70	
7765	Pucho & His Latin Soul Brothers	Jungle Fire!	1/12/70	
7766	Boogaloo Joe Jones	Right On Brother	2/16/70	
7767	Houston Person	Truth!	2/23/70	
7768	Richard "Groove" Holmes	The Best of Richard "Groove" Holmes for Beautiful People		selections from 7485, 7497, 7543, 7570, 7601
7769	Sonny Stitt with Brother Jack McDuff	The Best of Sonny Stitt with Brother Jack McDuff for Lovers		selections from 7244, 7297
7770	Willis Jackson	Soul Stompin': The Best of Willis Jackson		selections from 7196, 7232, 7260, 7264
7771	Brother Jack McDuff	The Best of Brother Jack McDuff & the Big Soul Band		selections from 7404, 7476, 7529, 7642
7772	Don Patterson	The Best of Don Patterson & the Jazz Giants		selections from 7381, 7510, 7563, 7577, 7613, 7640
7773	Shirley Scott and Stanley Turrentine	The Best of Shirley Scott & Stanley Turrentine		selections from 7205, 7226, 7267, 7312, 7338
7774	Gene Ammons with Brother Jack McDuff	The Best of Gene Ammons with Brother Jack McDuff		selections from 7238, 7228, 7234
7775	King Curtis	The Best of King Curtis: One More Time	7/11/61, 9/19/61, 9/22/61, 1/5/62, 2/15/62	
7776	Bennie Green	The Best of Bennie Green		selections from 7052, 7041, 7049
7777	Johnny "Hammond" Smith	The Best of Johnny "Hammond" Smith for Lovers		selections from 8221, 8229, 8241, 7420, 7203, 7408, 7464
7778	Red Holloway	The Best of Red Holloway & the Soul Organ Giants		selections from 7299, 7325, 7473
7779	Houston Person	The Best of Houston Person		selections from 7491, 7517, 7548, 7566, 7621, 7678
7780	Bobby Timmons	The Best of Bobby Timmons & His Soul Piano		selections from 7335, 7351, 7387, 7429, 7483
7781	Gene Ammons	Jammin' with Gene		reissue of 7060
7782	Eddie "Lockjaw" Davis	The Rev.		reissue of 7161
7783	Willis Jackson with Brother Jack McDuff	Cool Grits		reissue of 7162
7784	Etta Jones	Love Is the Thing		reissue of 7194
7785	Jack McDuff	Brother Jack		reissue of 7174
7786	Johnny "Hammond" Smith	Stimulation		reissue of 7203
7787	Prestige Blues Swingers	Outskirts of Town		reissue of 7145
7788	Wild Bill Jennings with Brother Jack McDuff	Enough Said!		reissue of 7164
7789	King Curtis	King Soul!		reissue of New Jazz NJ 8237
7790	Eddie "Lockjaw" Davis	Very Saxy		reissue of 7167
7791	Various artists	The Soul Giants	1962–1967	
7792	Gene Ammons	Brother Jug!	11/10/69	
7793	Eric Kloss	Consciousness!	1/6/70	
7794	Clifford Brown	The Clifford Brown Sextet in Paris	9/29/53, 10/8/53	
7795	Pat Martino	Desperado	3/9/70	
7796	Charles Kynard	Afro-Disiac	4/6/70	
7797	Billy Butler	Yesterday, Today & Tomorrow	4/27/70, 6/29/70	
7798	Rusty Bryant	Soul Liberation	6/15/70	
7799	Sonny Phillips	Black Magic!	5/18/70	
7800	Dave Van Ronk	In the Tradition		reissue of Folklore FL 14001

=== 7800 series ===
Cat. #	Artist	Title	Recording date	Notes
7801	Bonnie Dobson	Dear Companion		reissue of Folklore FL 14007
7802	Sonny Terry	Sonny Is King		reissue of Bluesville BV 1059
7803	Brownie McGhee and Sonny Terry	Brownie McGhee & Sonny Terry at the 2nd Fret		reissue of Bluesville BV 1058
7804	Ramblin' Jack Elliott	Country Style		reissue of Prestige Folklore FL 14029
7805	Reverend Gary Davis	Pure Religion		reissue of Bluesville BV 1015
7806	Lightnin' Hopkins	Hootin' the Blues		reissue of Prestige Folklore 14021.
7807	Little Brother Montgomery	Tasty Blues		reissue of Bluesville BV 1012
7808	Robert Pete Williams	Free Again		reissue of Bluesville BV 1026
7809	Blind Willie McTell	Last Session		reissue of Bluesville BV 1040
7810	Furry Lewis	Back on My Feet Again		reissue of Bluesville BV 1036
7811	Lightnin' Hopkins	The Blues of Lightnin' Hopkins		reissue of Bluesville BV 1019
7812	Rex Stewart and Wingy Manone	Trumpet Jive!	6/30/45, 12/15/44, 7/3/45	
7813	Oscar Pettiford	Oscar Pettiford Memorial Album	3/10/49, 3/13/54	
7814	Jack McDuff	Tough 'Duff		reissue of 7185
7815	Charles Earland	Black Drops	6/1/70	
7816	Don Patterson	Donny Brook	9/15/68	
7817	Zoot Sims	First Recordings	4/23-24/50, 6/16/50, 8/25/53	
7818	Dizzy Gillespie	The Dizzy Gillespie Orchestra at Salle Pleyel	2/28/48	
7819	Al Cohn	Broadway 1954	7/29/54	
7820	George Wallington	The George Wallington Quintet Live at Café Bohemia 1955	9/9/55	
7821	Sonny Rollins	Three Giants		reissue of 7038
7822	Miles Davis	Miles Ahead!		compilation; selections from 7044, 7054
7823	Gene Ammons	Blues Up & Down, Vol. 1	3/5/50, 4/26/50, 6/28/50	
7824	Coleman Hawkins	Bean and the Boys	10/19/44, 12/46, 12/21/49	
7825	John Coltrane	The Master		reissue of 7243
7826	Eric Dolphy	Live at the Five Spot, Vol. 2		reissue of 7294
7827	Lee Konitz	Ezz-thetic	3/8/51, 9/18/53	
7828	Annie Ross	The Bebop Singers	10/9/52, 12/30/52, 2/20/53	
7829	Dexter Gordon	The Panther!	7/7/70	
7830	Willis Jackson	Keep On Blowin'		reissue of 7172
7831	Lightnin' Hopkins	Got to Move Your Baby		reissue of Bluesville BV 1029
7832	Yusef Lateef	Imagination		reissue of New Jazz NJ 8238
7833	King Curtis	Soul Meeting!		reissue of 7222
7834	Eddie "Lockjaw" Davis	Stolen Moments		reissue of 7206
7835	Arnett Cobb	Go Power!!!		reissue of 7151
7836	Bill Jennings	Glide On		reissue of 7177
7837	Ray Bryant	Alone with the Blues		reissue of New Jazz NJ 8213
7838	Red Garland	It's a Blue World	2/7/58	
7839	Sonny Stitt	Bud's Blues		reissue of 7024 plus alternate takes
7840	Clifford Brown	The Clifford Brown Big Band in Paris	9/28/53, 10/10/53, 10/11/53	
7841	Al Haig	Al Haig Trio & Quintet	3/15/49, 3/13/54	
7842	Tadd Dameron	Tadd Dameron Memorial Album		reissue of 7037
7843	Eric Dolphy with Ron Carter	Where?		reissue of New Jazz NJ 8265
7844	Booker Ervin	Exultation!		reissue of 7293 plus alternate takes
7845	Shirley Scott and Stanley Turrentine	The Soul Is Willing		reissue of 7267
7846	Johnny "Hammond" Smith	Good 'Nuff		reissue of 7239
7847	Miles Davis	Oleo		selections from 7109, 7044
7848	Thelonious Monk	Blue Monk, Vol. 2	5/11/54, 9/22/54	selections from 7027, 7053, 7075
7849	Duke Jordan	Jordu	1/28/54	
7850	Willis Jackson	Blue Gator		reissue of 7183
7851	Brother Jack McDuff	On With It!	12/1/61	
7852	Don Patterson	Tune Up!	7/10/64, 6/2/69, 9/15/69	
7853	James Moody	Wail Moody Wail, Vol. 3	12/12/55	reissue of 7036 plus two bonus tracks
7854	Billy Butler	Night Life	1971	
7855	Jimmy Witherspoon	Mean Old Frisco		reissue of 7290
7856	Sonny Rollins	First Recordings		reissue of 7029
7857	Coleman Hawkins	Hawk Eyes		reissue of 7156
7858	Jimmy Forrest and Miles Davis	Live at the Barrel	1952	
7859	Red Garland	Satin Doll	8/12/59, 10/2/59	
7860	Jimmy Forrest and Miles Davis	Live at the Barrel Volume Two	1952	
7861	Dexter Gordon with Junior Mance	Dexter Gordon with Junior Mance at Montreux	6/18/70	
7862	Gene Ammons	Night Lights	2/2/70	

=== New Jazz and Status 8200 series (12" LPs) ===
Cat. #	Artist	Title	Recording date	Notes
8201	Mal Waldron	Mal / 3: Sounds	1/31/58	
8202	Idrees Sulieman	Roots	10/25/57, 12/6/57	
8203	Art Farmer	Farmer's Market	11/23/56	
8204	Phil Woods, Jackie McLean, Hal McKusick	Bird Feathers	3/29/57, 5/3/57, 12/27/57	
8205	Jerome Richardson	Midnight Oil	10/10/58	
8206	Steve Lacy	Reflections	10/17/58	
8207	George Wallington	The New York Scene		reissue of Prestige 16-5
8208	Mal Waldron	Mal / 4: Trio	9/26/58	
8209	Dorothy Ashby	In a Minor Groove	9/19/58	
8210	Roy Haynes, Phineas Newborn, Paul Chambers	We Three	11/14/58	
8211	Herbie Mann, Charlie Rouse, Kenny Burrell, Mal Waldron	Just Wailin'	2/14/58	
8212	Jackie McLean	McLean's Scene	12/14/56, 2/15/57	
8213	Ray Bryant	Alone with the Blues	12/19/58	
8214	Stan Getz	Long Island Sound		reissue of Prestige 7002
8215	Gil Evans	Big Stuff		reissue of Prestige 7120
8216	Teddy Charles	Coolin'	4/14/57	
8217	Tommy Flanagan	The Cats	4/18/57	
8218	Yusef Lateef	Other Sounds	10/11/57	
8219	Art Taylor	Taylor's Tenors	6/3/59	
8220	Benny Golson	Groovin' with Golson	8/28/59	
8221	Johnny Hammond Smith	All Soul	9/11/59	
8222	Curtis Peagler	Modern Jazz Disciples	9/8/59	
8223	Lem Winchester	Winchester Special	9/25/59	
8224	Oliver Nelson	Meet Oliver Nelson	10/30/59	
8225	Kenny Dorham	Quiet Kenny	11/13/59	
8226	Jerome Richardson	Roamin' with Richardson	10/21/59	
8227	Ray Bryant	Ray Bryant Trio		reissue of Prestige 7098
8228	Ray Draper	The Ray Draper Quintet featuring John Coltrane	12/20/57	
8229	Johnny Hammond Smith	That Good Feelin'	11/4/59	
8230	Gigi Gryce	Saying Somethin'!	3/11/60	
8231	Jackie McLean	Makin' the Changes	2/15/57, 8/30/57	
8232	John Jenkins, Clifford Jordan and Bobby Timmons	Jenkins, Jordan and Timmons	7/26/57	
8233	Oliver Nelson	Taking Care of Business	3/22/60	
8234	Yusef Lateef	Cry! - Tender	10/16/59	
8235	Benny Golson	Gone with Golson	6/20/59	
8236	Eric Dolphy	Outward Bound	4/1/60	
8237	King Curtis	The New Scene of King Curtis	4/21/60	
8238	Doug Watkins	Soulnik	5/17/60	
8239	Lem Winchester	Lem's Beat	4/19/60	
8240	Curtis Peagler	Right Down Front	9/8/59, 5/24/60	
8241	Johnny "Hammond" Smith	Talk That Talk	4/22/60	
8242	Mal Waldron	Impressions	3/20/59	
8243	Oliver Nelson, Eric Dolphy	Screamin' the Blues	5/27/60	
8244	Lem Winchester	Another Opus	6/4/60	
8245	Roy Haynes, Richard Wyands, Eddie DeHaas	Just Us	7/5/60	
8246	Gigi Gryce	The Hap'nin's	5/3/60	
8247	Ken McIntyre, Eric Dolphy	Looking Ahead	6/28/60	
8248	Benny Golson	Gettin' with It	12/23/59	
8249	Larry Young	Testifying	8/2/60	
8250	Jimmy Forrest	Forrest Fire	8/9/60	
8251	Latin Jazz Quintet, Eric Dolphy	Caribe	8/19/60	
8252	Eric Dolphy	Out There	8/15/60	
8253	Jackie McLean	A Long Drink of the Blues	2/15/57, 8/30/57	
8254	Walt Dickerson	This Is Walt Dickerson!	3/7/61	
8255	Oliver Nelson / Eric Dolphy	Straight Ahead	3/1/61	
8256	Jaki Byard, Ron Carter, Roy Haynes	Here's Jaki	3/14/61	
8257	Don Ellis	New Ideas	5/11/61	
8258	Art Farmer	Early Art		reissue of Prestige LP 177 & 193 (10-inch LPs)
8259	Ken McIntyre	Stone Blues	5/31/60	
8260	Eric Dolphy	At the Five Spot	7/16/61	
8261	Yusef Lateef	The Sounds of Yusef		reissue of Prestige 7122
8262	Gigi Gryce	The Rat Race Blues	6/9/60	
8263	Jackie McLean	Lights Out!		reissue of Prestige 7035
8264	Larry Young	Young Blues	9/30/60	
8265	Ron Carter, Eric Dolphy	Where?	6/20/61	
8266	Ahmed Abdul-Malik	The Music of Ahmed Abdul-Malik	5/23/61	
8267	Roland Alexander	Pleasure Bent	6/17/61	
8268	Walt Dickerson	A Sense of Direction	5/5/61	
8269	Mal Waldron, Eric Dolphy	The Quest	6/27/61	
8270	Eric Dolphy	Far Cry	12/21/60	
8271	Steve Lacy, Don Cherry	Evidence	11/14/61	
8272	Yusef Lateef	Into Something	12/29/61	
8273	Jaki Byard, Ron Carter, Pete LaRoca	Hi-Fly	1/30/62	
8274	Dizzy Reece	Asia Minor	3/13/62	
8275	Walt Dickerson	Relativity	1/16/62	
8276	Kenny Burrell, John Coltrane	Kenny Burrell and John Coltrane	3/7/58	
8277	Curtis Fuller, Red Garland	Curtis Fuller with Red Garland	5/14/57	
8278	Art Farmer	Work of Art		reissue of Prestige 7031
8279	Jackie McLean	4, 5 and 6		reissue of Prestige 7048
8280	Zoot Sims	Good Old Zoot	7/16/54	see NJ 1102
8281	Dave Pike	Bossa Nova Carnival	9/6/62, 9/7/62	
8282	Ahmed Abdul-Malik	Sounds of Africa	5/23/61, 8/22/62	
8283	Walt Dickerson	To My Queen	9/21/62	
8284	Dave Pike	Limbo Carnival	12/12/62	
8285	Pony Poindexter	Pony Poindexter Plays the Big Ones	1/31/63	
8286	Roy Haynes, Booker Ervin	Cracklin'	4/10/63	
8287	Roy Haynes	Cymbalism	9/10/63	
8288	Johnny Hammond Smith	Look Out!	1/22/62	
8289	Art Farmer	Evening in Casablanca		reissue of Prestige 7017
8290	Jackie McLean	Steeplechase		reissue of Prestige 7068
8291	Phil Woods	Pot Pie	10/12/54, 2/4/55	
8292	Various artists	Jazz Soul of Cleopatra	5/31/57, 10/11/57, 5/23/61, 3/13/62	
8293	Jimmy Forrest	Soul Street	9/9/60, 9/1/61, 10/19/61, 6/1/62	
8294	Bob Brookmeyer	Revelation		reissue of Prestige 7066
8295	Lee Konitz & Miles Davis / Teddy Charles & Jimmy Raney	Ezz-Thetic	3/8/51, 12/23/52	= Prestige PR 16011
8296	Fats Navarro, Dizzy Gillespie, Miles Davis	Trumpet Giants	9/20/49, 9/16/50, 10/5/51	
8297	Pony Poindexter	Gumbo	6/27/63	= Prestige 16001
8298	Ahmed Abdul-Malik	Eastern Moods	6/13/63	= Prestige 16003
8299	Gildo Mahones	I'm Shooting High	2/4/63, 8/15/63, 9/3/63	= Prestige 16004
8300	Tadd Dameron	Dameronia		reissue of Prestige 7037 = 16007
8301	Clifford Brown	Clifford Brown Memorial	6/11/53, 7/15/53	not released, transferred to Prestige 7055 = 16008
8302	Zoot Sims	Trotting		reissue of Prestige 7026 = 16009
8303	Ahmed Abdul-Malik	Spellbound	3/12/64	
8304	Red Garland, Phil Woods	Sugan		
8305	Curtis Fuller, Hampton Hawes	Curtis Fuller & Hampton Hawes & French Horns		
8306	Gerry Mulligan	Broadway		
8307	Hampton Hawes, Freddie Redd	Movin'		reissue of Prestige 7067
8308	Steve Lacy, Wynton Kelly	Soprano Today		reissue of Prestige 7125
8309	Zoot Sims, Phil Woods	Koo Koo		reissue of Prestige 7033
8310	Frank Wess, Thad Jones	Touche		reissue of Prestige 7084
8311	Hank Mobley	52nd Street Theme		reissue of Prestige 7061
8312	Jackie McLean	Alto Madness!		reissue of Prestige 7114
8313	Billy Taylor	Live at Town Hall		reissue of Prestige 7093
8314	Red Garland	Lil' Darlin'		
8315	Sonny Rollins	My Fair Lady		
8316	Mal Waldron	The Dealers		
8317	Donald Byrd, Kenny Burrell, Frank Foster, Hank Mobley, Mal Waldron, Curtis Fuller, Paul Quinichette, Hank Jones	Body & Soul	12/28/56, 1/4/57, 5/11/57, 5/17/57	
8318	Kenny Burrell / Barry Galbraith	Guitar Soul		
8319	Various artists	Lusty Moods		reissue of Moodsville 37
8320	Clea Bradford, Clark Terry	Clea Bradford with Clark Terry		reissue of Tru-Sound 15005
8321	Latin Jazz Quintet	Latin Soul		
8322	John Wright	The Last Amen		
8323	Jackie McLean	Jackie McLean and Co.		reissue of Prestige 7087
8324	Oliver Nelson / Eric Dolphy	Screamin' the Blues		reissue of New Jazz 8243
8325	Red Garland, John Coltrane	High Pressure		reissue of Prestige 7209
8326	Red Garland	Red Garland Live!		
8327	John Coltrane, Frank Wess	Wheelin' & Dealin'		reissue of Prestige 7131

=== 10000 series (12" LPs) ===
The Prestige 10000 Series commenced in 1971 when the label was sold to Fantasy Records and the label was moved to San Francisco California

Cat. #	Artist	Title	Recording date	Notes
10001	Melvin Sparks	Sparks!	9/14/70	
10002	Johnny "Hammond" Smith	Here It 'Tis	9/21/70	
10003	Houston Person	Person to Person!	10/12/70	
10004	Boogaloo Joe Jones	No Way!	10/23/70	
10005	Idris Muhammad	Black Rhythm Revolution!	10/2/70	
10006	Gene Ammons	The Black Cat!	10/11/70	
10007	Sonny Phillips	Black on Black!	7/27/70	
10008	Charles Kynard	Wa-Tu-Wa-Zui (Beautiful People)	12/14/70	
10009	Charles Earland	Living Black!	9/17/70	
10010	Gene Ammons with Dexter Gordon	The Chase!	7/26/70	
10011	Leon Spencer Jr.	Sneak Preview!	12/7/70	
10012	Sonny Stitt	Turn It On!	1/4/71	
10013	Bernard Purdie	Purdie Good!	1/11/71	
10014	Rusty Bryant	Fire Eater	2/8/71	
10015	Johnny "Hammond" Smith	What's Going On	4/12/71	
10016	Melvin Sparks	Spark Plug	3/1/71, 3/8/71	
10017	Houston Person	Houston Express	4/8/71, 4/9/71	
10018	Charles Earland	Soul Story	5/3/71	
10019	Gene Ammons and Sonny Stitt	You Talk That Talk!	2/8/71	
10020	Dexter Gordon	The Jumpin' Blues	8/27/70	
10021	Gene Ammons	Brother Jug!	10/10/69, 10/11/69	reissue of Prestige PR 7792
10022	Gene Ammons	My Way	7/26/71	
10023	Gene Ammons	The Boss Is Back!	10/10/69, 10/11/69	reissue of Prestige PR 7739
10024	Charles Earland	Black Talk!	12/15/69	reissue of Prestige PR 7758
10025	Boogaloo Joe Jones	Right On Brother!	2/16/70	reissue of Prestige PR 7766
10026	Houston Person	Truth!	2/23/70	reissue of Prestige PR 7767
10027	Houston Person	Goodness!	8/25/69	reissue of Prestige PR 7678
10028	Rusty Bryant	Soul Liberation	6/15/70	reissue of Prestige PR 7798
10029	Charlie Earland	Black Drops	6/1/70	reissue of Prestige PR 7815
10030	Dexter Gordon	The Panther!	7/7/70	reissue of Prestige PR 7829
10031	Funk, Inc.	Funk, Inc.	1971	
10032	Sonny Stitt	Black Vibrations	7/9/71	
10033	Leon Spencer	Louisiana Slim	7/7/71	
10034	Archie Shepp	Black Gypsy	11/9/69	reissue of America (F) 30 AM 6099 entitled Black Gipsy
10035	Boogaloo Joe Jones	What It Is	8/16/71	
10036	Idris Muhammad	Peace and Rhythm	9/13/71, 9/20/71	
10037	Rusty Bryant	Wild Fire	10/4/71	
10038	Bernard Purdie	Shaft	10/11/71	
10039	Melvin Sparks	Akilah!	2/14/71, 2/21/71	
10040	Gene Ammons	Free Again	3/20/72	
10041	Charles Earland	Intensity	2/16/72, 2/17/72	
10042	Leon Spencer	Bad Walking Woman	2/22/72	
10043	Funk, Inc.	Chicken Lickin'	3/18/72	
10044	Houston Person	Broken Windows, Empty Hallways	5/1/72	
10045	Bayete Umbra Zindiko	Worlds Around the Sun	6/26/72	
10046	Hampton Hawes	Universe	6/72	
10047	Art Blakey and the Jazz Messengers	Child's Dance	5/23/72, 7/28/72	
10048	Sonny Stitt	Goin' Down Slow	2/15/72	
10049	Art Ensemble of Chicago with Fontella Bass	Art Ensemble of Chicago with Fontella Bass	8/70	reissue of America (F) 30 AM 6117
10050	Charles Earland	Live at the Lighthouse	10/9/72	
10051	Dexter Gordon	Ca'Purange	6/22/72	
10052	Mose Allison	Seventh Son	1957–59	
10053	Rusty Bryant	Friday Night Funk for Saturday Night Brothers	7/17/72	
10054	Maynard Parker	Midnight Rider	11/7/72	
10055	Houston Person	Sweet Buns & Barbeque	9/11/72, 11/7/72	
10056	Ivan "Boogaloo Joe" Jones	Snake Rhythm Rock	11/24/72	
10057	Gary Bartz NTU Troop	Juju Street Songs	10/72	
10058	Gene Ammons	Got My Own	10/28/72, 10/30/72, 11/1/72	
10059	Funk, Inc.	Hangin' Out	12/1/72	
10060	Hampton Hawes	Blues for Walls	1/16/73, 1/17/73, 1/18/73	
10061	Charles Earland	Charles III	2/16/72, 2/17/72, 2/14/73	
10062	Bayete Umbra Zindiko	Seeking Other Beauty	9/18/72, 10/2/72	
10063	Leon Spencer	Where I'm Coming From	2/22/72, 1/26/73	
10064	Art Ensemble of Chicago	Phase One	2/71	reissue of America (F) 30 AM 6116
10065	Gene Ammons and James Moody	Chicago Concert	11/21/71	
10066	Archie Shepp	Coral Rock	7/23/70	reissue of America (F) 30 AM 6103
10067	Art Blakey and the Jazz Messengers	Buhaina	3/26-29/73	
10068	Gary Bartz NTU Troop	Follow the Medicine Man	10/72	
10069	Dexter Gordon	Generation	7/22/772	
10070	Gene Ammons	Big Bad Jug	10/28/72, 10/30/72, 11/1/72	
10071	Funk, Inc.	Superfunk	7/73	
10072	Ivan "Boogaloo Joe" Jones	Black Whip	7/25/73	
10073	Rusty Bryant	For the Good Times	3/9/73	
10074	Sonny Stitt	So Doggone Good	9/13/72, 9/14/72	
10075	Ice	Ice	1973	reissue of Each Man Makes His Destiny, Kedzie 60-3733
10076	Art Blakey and the Jazz Messengers	Anthenagin	3/26/73, 3/27/73	
10077	Hampton Hawes	Playin' in the Yard	7/7/73	
10078	Gene Ammons	Gene Ammons and Friends at Montreux	7/7/73	
10079	Dexter Gordon	Blues à la Suisse	7/7/73	
10080	Gene Ammons	Brasswind	10/30/73	
10081	Jack DeJohnette	Sorcery	3-5/74	
10082	Charles Earland	The Dynamite Brothers	11/73	
10083	Ntu Gary Bartz	Singerella: A Ghetto Fairy Tale	11/73, 2/74	
10084	Gene Ammons	Gene Ammons Greatest Hits		selections from PR 7180, 7192, 7257, 7792 and 10022
10085	Rusty Bryant	Until It's Time for You to Go	7/1/74, 7/2/74	
10086	Azar Lawrence	Bridge into the New Age	5/74, 9/74	
10087	Funk, Inc.	Priced to Sell	7-9/74	
10088	Hampton Hawes	Northern Windows	7/18/74, 7/19/74	
10089	Patrice Rushen	Prelusion	8/8/74, 8/9/74	
10090	Nat Adderley	Double Exposure	1974	
10091	Dexter Gordon	Tangerine	6/22/72, 6/28/72	
10092	Gary Bartz	The Shadow Do	1975	
10093	Gene Ammons	Goodbye	3/18/74, 3/19/74, 3/20/74	
10094	Jack DeJohnette	Cosmic Chicken	4/24/75, 4/25/75, 4/26/75	
10095	Charles Earland	Kharma	7/6/74	
10096	Ice	Import Export	1975	original release on Kedzie 60-3738 - Frisco Disco
10097	Azar Lawrence	Summer Solstice	4/29/74	
10098	Patrice Rushen	Before the Dawn	8/75	
10099	Azar Lawrence	People Moving	3/76	
10100	Gene Ammons and Sonny Stitt	Together Again for the Last Time	11/20/73, 11/21/73	
10101	Patrice Rushen	Shout It Out	1976	
10102	Bill Summers	Feel the Heat	10/76	
10103	Bill Summers	Cayenne	11/77	
10104	David "Fathead" Newman	Concrete Jungle	11/77	
10105	Bill Summers	Straight to the Bank	4/78, 6/78	
10106	David "Fathead" Newman	Keep the Dream Alive	5/23/77	
10107	Bill Summers	On Sunshine		
10108	David "Fathead" Newman	Scratch My Back	3/79	
10109	Mark Soskin	Rhythm Vision	12/79	
10110	Patrice Rushen	Let There Be Funk: The Best of Patrice Rushen		

=== Swingville (12" LPs) ===
- SVLP 2001 Coleman Hawkins and Red Garland – Coleman Hawkins with the Red Garland Trio
- SVLP 2002 Tiny Grimes – Tiny in Swingville
- SVLP 2003 Buddy Tate and His band – Tate's Date
- SVLP 2004 Tiny Grimes – Callin' the Blues – reissue of Prestige PRLP 7144
- SVLP 2005 Coleman Hawkins – Coleman Hawkins All Stars
- SVLP 2006 Rex Stewart – The Happy Jazz of Rex Stewart
- SVLP 2007 Al Casey – Buck Jumpin'
- SVLP 2008 Pee Wee Russell with Buck Clayton – Swingin' with Pee Wee
- SVLP 2009 Claude Hopkins with Buddy Tate and Emmett Berry – Yes Indeed!
- SVLP 2010 The Swingville All-Stars featuring Al Sears, Taft Jordan and Hilton Jefferson – Rockin' in Rhythm
- SVLP 2011 Joe Newman – Jive at Five
- SVLP 2012 Bud Freeman with Shorty Baker – The Bud Freeman All-Stars featuring Shorty Baker
- SVLP 2013 The Prestige Blues-Swingers – Stasch
- SVLP 2014 Buddy Tate / Clark Terry – Tate-a-Tate
- SVLP 2015 Budd Johnson – Let's Swing!
- SVLP 2016 Coleman Hawkins – Night Hawk
- SVLP 2017 Buck Clayton / Buddy Tate – Buck & Buddy
- SVLP 2018 Al Sears – Swing's the Thing
- SVLP 2019 Joe Newman – Good 'n' Groovy
- SVLP 2020 Claude Hopkins with Buddy Tate and Joe Thomas – Let's Jam
- SVLP 2021 Shorty Baker and Doc Cheatham – Shorty & Doc
- SVLP 2022 Jimmy Hamilton – It's About Time
- SVLP 2023 Hal Singer – Blue Stompin'
- SVLP 2024/25 The First Annual Prestige Swing Festival featuring Coleman Hawkins, Buddy Tate, Al Sears, Hilton Jefferson – Things Ain't What They Used to Be - 2-LP set reissued as two separate LPs: Things Ain't What They Used to Be and Years Ago and re-released as Jam Session in Swingville
- SVLP 2026 Cliff Jackson / Dick Wellstood – Uptown and Lowdown
- SVLP 2027 Joe Newman – Joe's Hap'nin's
- SVLP 2028 Jimmy Hamilton – Can't Help Swinging
- SVLP 2029 Buddy Tate – Groovin' with Buddy Tate
- SVLP 2030 Buck Clayton / Buddy Tate – Buck & Buddy Blow the Blues
- SVLP 2031 Leonard Gaskin – At the Jazz Band Ball
- SVLP 2032 Benny Carter/Ben Webster/Barney Bigard – BBB & Co.
- SVLP 2033 Leonard Gaskin – Darktown Strutters Ball
- SVLP 2034 Henry "Red" Allen – Mr. Allen
- SVLP 2035 Coleman Hawkins – Blues Groove – reissue of Prestige PRLP 7138
- SVLP 2036 Paul Quinichette – For Basie – reissue of Prestige PRLP 7127
- SVLP 2037 The Prestige All Stars – Basie Reunion – reissue of Prestige PRLP 7147
- SVLP 2038 Coleman Hawkins – Soul – reissue of Prestige PRLP 7149
- SVLP 2039 Coleman Hawkins – Hawk Eyes – reissue of Prestige PRLP 7156
- SVLP 2040 Leonard Gaskin – Dixieland Hits
- SVLP 2041 Claude Hopkins with Budd Johnson and Vic Dickenson – Swing Time!

=== Moodsville (12" LPs) ===
- MVLP 1 Red Garland/Eddie "Lockjaw" Davis – The Red Garland Trio + Eddie "Lockjaw" Davis
- MVLP 2 Various Artists – Modern Moods
- MVLP 3 Red Garland – Red Alone
- MVLP 4 Eddie "Lockjaw" Davis/Shirley Scott – Eddie "Lockjaw" Davis with Shirley Scott
- MVLP 5 Shirley Scott – The Shirley Scott Trio
- MVLP 6 Red Garland – The Red Garland Trio
- MVLP 7 Coleman Hawkins – At Ease with Coleman Hawkins
- MVLP 8 Frank Wess – The Frank Wess Quartet
- MVLP 9 Tommy Flanagan – The Tommy Flanagan Trio
- MVLP 10 Red Garland – Alone with the Blues
- MVLP 11 Lem Winchester – Lem Winchester with Feeling
- MVLP 12 Al Casey – The Al Casey Quartet
- MVLP 13 Oliver Nelson/Lem Winchester – Nocturne
- MVLP 14 Arnett Cobb – Ballads by Cobb
- MVLP 15 Coleman Hawkins – The Hawk Relaxes
- MVLP 16 Billy Taylor – Interlude
- MVLP 17 Willis Jackson – In My Solitude
- MVLP 18 Gene Ammons – Nice an' Cool
- MVLP 19 Shirley Scott – Like Cozy
- MVLP 20 Clark Terry – Everything's Mellow
- MVLP 21 Taft Jordan – Taft Jordan Plays Duke Ellington – Mood Indigo!!!
- MVLP 22 Yusef Lateef – Eastern Sounds
- MVLP 23 Coleman Hawkins – Good Old Broadway
- MVLP 24 Sam Taylor – The Bad and the Beautiful
- MVLP 25 Coleman Hawkins – The Jazz Version of No Strings
- MVLP 26 Clark Terry – Clark Terry Plays the Jazz Version of All American
- MVLP 27 Cootie Williams – The Solid Trumpet of Cootie Williams
- MVLP 28 Gene Ammons – The Soulful Moods of Gene Ammons
- MVLP 29 Kenny Burrell with Coleman Hawkins – Bluesy Burrell
- MVLP 30 Eddie "Lockjaw" Davis/Shirley Scott – Misty
- MVLP 31 Coleman Hawkins – Coleman Hawkins Plays Make Someone Happy from Do Re Mi
- MVLP 32 Miles Davis/John Coltrane – Miles Davis and John Coltrane Play Richard Rodgers
- MVLP 33 Various Artists – Music of George Gershwin Played by America's Greatest Jazzmen
- MVLP 34 Various Artists – Music of Cole Porter Played by America's Greatest Jazzmen
- MVLP 35 Various Artists – Music of Richard Rodgers Played by America's Greatest Jazzmen
- MVLP 36 Dave Pike – Dave Pike Plays the Jazz Version of Oliver!
- MVLP 37 Various Artists – Lusty Moods Played by America's Greatest Jazzmen
- MVLP 38 Various Artists – The Broadway Scene Played by America's Greatest Jazzmen
- MVLP 39 Lucky Thompson – Lucky Thompson Plays Jerome Kern and No More

=== Brief Revival ===
- PRS-00112 Jazzmeia Horn - A Social Call - 2017
