= Osie Johnson =

American jazz musician (1923–1966)

- Born: James Johnson; January 11, 1923; Washington, D.C., United States
- Died: February 10, 1966 (aged 43) New York City, N.Y., United States
- Genre: Jazz
- Occupation: Musician
- Instrument: Drums

James "Osie" Johnson (January 11, 1923, in Washington, D.C. – February 10, 1966, in New York City) was a jazz drummer, arranger and singer.

== Biography ==
Johnson studied at Armstrong Highschool, where he was classmates with Leo Parker and Frank Wess. He first worked with Sabby Lewis and then, after service in the United States Navy, freelanced for a time in Chicago. From 1951 to 1953, he was a member of Earl Hines's band. He spent some time in the 1950s in Tony Scott's orchestra, alongside musicians including Bill Evans, Milt Hinton, Thad Jones, Kai Winding, Sahib Shihab, Zoot Sims, and Wess, and laying down grooves for Harry Belafonte's breakout albums.

Johnson has been recognized as a player whose breadth of performance and recordings during his lifetime seem out of proportion to his relatively low profile thereafter. He can be heard on albums by Paul Gonsalves, Sims, and Mose Allison and is the drummer on Bobby Darin's "Mack the Knife". (Some sources list Don Lamond as the drummer on "Mack the Knife") and on Ray Conniff's first album 'S Wonderful!. He recorded the album A Bit of the Blues as a singer and arranged the hit "Fool That I Am" for singer Dinah Washington. His final recordings as a singer were on a J. J. Johnson album, now compiled as a collection called Goodies.

In 1957, Johnson appeared with Thelonious Monk and Ahmed Abdul-Malik on The Sound of Jazz.

Johnson died from kidney failure in 1966, at the age of 43.

== Discography ==
=== As leader ===
- 1955: Johnson's Whacks
- 1955: Osie's Oasis with Henry Coker, Charlie Fowlkes, Milt Hinton, Bill Hughes, Thad Jones, Dick Katz, Wendell Marshall, Frank Wess, Ernie Wilkins
- 1955: Swingin' Sounds
- 1956: A Bit of the Blues
- 1957: The Happy Jazz of Osie Johnson (Bethlehem)

=== As sideman ===
With Bob Brookmeyer

- Brookmeyer (Vik, 1956)
- Jazz Concerto Grosso with Gerry Mulligan and Phil Sunkel (ABC-Paramount, 1957)
- The Street Swingers with Jim Hall and Jimmy Raney (World Pacific, 1957)
- Kansas City Revisited (United Artists, 1958)

With Jimmy Cleveland

- Introducing Jimmy Cleveland and His All Stars (EmArcy, 1955)
- Rhythm Crazy (EmArcy, 1964)

With Al Cohn

- Mr. Music (RCA Victor, 1955)
- The Natural Seven (RCA Victor, 1955)
- That Old Feeling (RCA Victor, 1955)
- Four Brass One Tenor (RCA Victor, 1955)
- From A to...Z (RCA Victor, 1956) with Zoot Sims
- The Sax Section (Epic, 1956)
- Cohn on the Saxophone (Dawn, 1956)

With Coleman Hawkins

- Accent on Tenor Sax (Urania, 1955)
- The Hawk in Hi Fi (RCA Victor, 1956)
- The Hawk in Paris (Vik, 1956)
- Soul (Prestige, 1958)
- Hawk Eyes (Prestige, 1959)
- Coleman Hawkins All Stars with Joe Thomas and Vic Dickenson (Swingville, 1960)
- At Ease with Coleman Hawkins (Moodsville, 1960)
- Coleman Hawkins and His Orchestra (Crown, 1960)
- The Hawk Swings (Crown, 1960)

With Johnny Hodges

- Sandy's Gone (Verve, 1963)
- Blue Rabbit (Verve, 1964)
- Con-Soul & Sax with Wild Bill Davis (RCA Victor, 1965)

With Hank Jones

- The Talented Touch (Capitol, 1958)
- This Is Ragtime Now! (ABC-Paramount, 1964)

With Quincy Jones

- The Birth of a Band! (Mercury, 1959)
- Quincy Jones Explores the Music of Henry Mancini (Mercury, 1964)

With Johnny Mathis

- Johnny Mathis (Columbia, 1956)

With Howard McGhee

- Life Is Just a Bowl of Cherries (Bethlehem, 1956)
- Music from the Connection (Felsted, 1960)

With Joe Newman

- New Sounds in Swing with Billy Byers (Jazztone, 1956)
- I Feel Like a Newman (Storyville, 1956)
- The Midgets (Vik, 1956)
- Locking Horns (Rama, 1957) with Zoot Sims

With Oscar Pettiford

- Basically Duke (Bethlehem, 1954)
- Another One (Bethlehem, 1955)
- The Oscar Pettiford Orchestra in Hi-Fi (ABC-Paramount, 1956)

With Jimmy Raney

- Jimmy Raney featuring Bob Brookmeyer (ABC-Paramount, 1956) with Bob Brookmeyer
- Two Jims and Zoot (Mainstream, 1964) with Jim Hall and Zoot Sims

With Ben Webster

- Music with Feeling (Norgran, 1955)
- See You at the Fair (Impulse!, 1964)

With others

- Manny Albam, The Drum Suite (RCA Victor, 1956) with Ernie Wilkins
- Mose Allison, Takes to the Hills (Epic, 1961)
- Mose Allison, I Don't Worry About a Thing (Atlantic, 1962)
- Harry Belafonte, Belafonte Sings the Blues (RCA Victor, 1959)
- Charles Brown, Boss of the Blues (Mainstream, 1963)
- Charles Brown, Ballads My Way (Mainstream, 1965)
- Clifford Brown, The Beginning and the End (Columbia, 1973)
- Oscar Brown, Sin & Soul (Columbia, 1960)
- Ray Bryant, Ray Bryant Trio (Epic, 1956)
- Kenny Burrell, Bluesin' Around (Columbia, 1983)
- Ralph Burns and Leonard Feather, Winter Sequence (MGM, 1954)
- Arnett Cobb, Smooth Sailing (Prestige, 1959)
- Freddy Cole, Waiter, Ask the Man to Play the Blues (Dot, 1964)
- Perry Como, Saturday Night with Mr. C (RCA Victor, 1958)
- Bobby Darin, That's All (Atco, 1959)
- Jean DuShon, Feeling Good (Cadet, 1965)
- Art Farmer, Last Night When We Were Young (ABC-Paramount, 1957)
- Aretha Franklin, Aretha: With The Ray Bryant Combo (Columbia, 1961)
- Curtis Fuller, Cabin in the Sky (Impulse!, 1962)
- Bennie Green, Bennie Green Blows His Horn (Prestige, 1955)
- Freddie Green, Mr. Rhythm (RCA Victor, 1955)
- Urbie Green, All About Urbie Green and His Big Band (ABC-Paramount, 1956)
- Tiny Grimes, Callin' the Blues with J. C. Higginbotham (Prestige, 1958)
- Gigi Gryce, Gigi Gryce (MetroJazz, 1958)
- Lionel Hampton, You Better Know It!!! (Impulse!, 1965)
- Johnny Hartman, All of Me: The Debonair Mr. Hartman (Bethlehem, 1957)
- Johnny Hartman, The Voice That Is! (Impulse!, 1964)
- Tramaine Hawkins, To a Higher Place (Columbia, 1994)
- Claude Hopkins, Yes Indeed! with Buddy Tate and Emmett Berry (Swingville, 1960)
- Lena Horne, Lena on the Blue Side (RCA Victor, 1962)
- Langston Hughes, Weary Blues (MGM, 1958)
- Illinois Jacquet, The Kid and the Brute with Ben Webster (Clef, 1955)
- Budd Johnson, French Cookin' (Argo, 1963)
- J. J. Johnson, Goodies (RCA, 1965)
- Mundell Lowe, Porgy & Bess (RCA Camden, 1958)
- Junior Mance, The Soul of Hollywood (Jazzland, 1962)
- Gary McFarland, The Jazz Version of "How to Succeed in Business without Really Trying" (Verve, 1962)
- Carmen McRae, Carmen McRae (Bethlehem, 1954)
- Helen Merrill, Helen Merrill (EmArcy, 1954)
- Helen Merrill, The Artistry of Helen Merrill (Mainstream, 1965)
- Joe Mooney, Lush Life (Atlantic, 1958)
- Phineas Newborn, Jr., Phineas Newborn, Jr. Plays Harold Arlen's Music from Jamaica (RCA Victor, 1957)
- Bud Powell, Blues for Bud (Columbia, 1958)
- Della Reese, Melancholy Baby (Jubilee, 1957)
- Irene Reid, Room for One More (Verve, 1965)
- George Russell, The Jazz Workshop (RCA Victor, 1957)
- Pee Wee Russell, Swingin' with Pee Wee with Buck Clayton (Swingville, 1960)
- A. K. Salim, Stable Mates (Savoy, 1957)
- Shirley Scott, Great Scott!! (Impulse!, 1964)
- Zoot Sims, Zoot! (Riverside, 1956)
- Hal Singer, Blue Stompin' (Prestige, 1959) with Charlie Shavers
- Sonny Stitt, Broadway Soul (Colpix, 1965)
- Sylvia Syms, Sylvia Is! (Prestige, 1965)
- Buddy Tate, Tate's Date (Swingville, 1960)
- Billy Taylor, Kwamina (Mercury, 1961)
- Frank Wess, Southern Comfort (Prestige, 1962)
- Joe Wilder, The Pretty Sound (Columbia, 1959)
- Cootie Williams, Cootie Williams in Hi-Fi (RCA Victor, 1958)
- Joe Williams, Me and the Blues (RCA Victor, 1964)
- Kai Winding, Dance to the City Beat (Columbia, 1959)
- Phil Woods, Rights of Swing (Candid, 1961)
- Eddie Jefferson, The Jazz Singer (Evidence, 1959)
