= Blues Groove =

Studio album by Tiny Grimes with Coleman Hawkins
- Released: 1958
- Recorded: February 28, 1958
- Studio: Van Gelder Studio, Hackensack, New Jersey
- Genre: Jazz
- Length: 44:45
- Label: Prestige
- Producer: Bob Weinstock

Tiny Grimes chronology
Blues Groove (1958)	Callin' the Blues (1958)

Coleman Hawkins chronology
Coleman Hawkins and Confreres (1957)	Blues Groove (1958)	Bean Bags (1958)

Blues Groove is an album by guitarist Tiny Grimes with saxophonist Coleman Hawkins, recorded in 1958 and released on the Prestige label. The album was rereleased under Hawkins' leadership.

== Reception ==
Professional ratings
Review scores
Source	Rating
AllMusic	3/5 stars
The Penguin Guide to Jazz Recordings	3/4 stars
The Rolling Stone Jazz Record Guide	3/5 stars

AllMusic awarded the album 3 stars and its review by Jim Todd states, "This music will appeal to fans of Grimes' vintage electric guitar and to those interested in an opportunity to hear Hawkins take an extended foray into the blues".

== Track listing ==
All tracks are written by Tiny Grimes except where noted.

No.	Title	Length
1.	"Marchin' Along"	17:37
2.	"A Smooth One" (Benny Goodman)	5:55
3.	"Blues Wail"	6:45
4.	"April in Paris" (Vernon Duke/Yip Harburg)	6:40
5.	"Soul Station"	7:48

== Personnel ==
- Tiny Grimes – guitar
- Coleman Hawkins – tenor saxophone
- Musa Kaleem – flute
- Ray Bryant – piano
- Earl Womack – double bass
- Teagle Fleming Jr. – drums
