= You Better Know It!!! =

Studio album by Lionel Hampton
- Released: 1964
- Recorded: October 28 & 29, 1964
- Genre: Jazz
- Length: 36:22
- Label: Impulse!
- Producer: Bob Thiele

Lionel Hampton chronology
Lionel at Malibu (1961)	You Better Know It!!! (1964)	Newport Uproar (1967)

You Better Know It!!! is an album by American jazz vibraphonist Lionel Hampton featuring performances recorded in 1964 for the Impulse! label.

== Reception ==
The Allmusic review by Ron Wynn awarded the album 3 stars and stated "There was no wasted energy or unnecessary or exaggerated solos; just bluesy, assertive, muscular arrangements, accompaniment, and ensemble segments".

Professional ratings
Review scores
Source	Rating
Allmusic	3/5 stars
The Penguin Guide to Jazz Recordings	2.5/4 stars
Record Mirror	4/5 stars

== Track listing ==
All compositions by Lionel Hampton except as indicated

1. "Ring Dem Bells" (Duke Ellington, Irving Mills) – 3:28
2. "Vibraphone Blues" – 5:06
3. "Tempo's Birthday" (Hampton, Joe Morris) – 3:58
4. "Sweethearts on Parade" (Carmen Lombardo, Charles Newman) – 3:12
5. "Moon Over My Annie" (Manny Albam) – 5:32 - bonus track, did not appear on original LP*
6. "Pick-A-Rib" (Benny Goodman, Hampton) – 3:34
7. "Trick or Treat" (Albam) – 6:02
8. "Cute" (Neil Hefti, Stanley Styne) – 3:05
9. "A Taste of Honey" (Ric Marlow, Bobby Scott) – 2:43
10. "Swingle Jingle" – 2:54
- Recorded at Rudy Van Gelder Studio in Englewood Cliffs, New Jersey on October 28 (tracks 1, 5–7) & 29 (tracks 2–4, 8–10), 1964
- Originally appeared on "The Definitive Jazz Scene Volume Two" (Impulse!, 1964 - AS-100)

== Personnel ==
- Lionel Hampton – vibes, vocals, piano (on #10 only)
- Clark Terry – trumpet
- Ben Webster – tenor saxophone
- Hank Jones – piano (except on #10)
- Milt Hinton – bass
- Osie Johnson – drums
