= Kaleidoscope (Sonny Stitt album) =

Compilation album by Sonny Stitt
- Released: 1957
- Recorded: February 17 and December 15, 1950, January 31 and February 1, 1951 and February 25, 1952; New York City
- Genre: Jazz
- Length: 44:26
- Label: Prestige; PRLP 7077
- Producer: Bob Weinstock

Sonny Stitt chronology
Stitt's Bits (1950)	Kaleidoscope (1957)	Jazz at the Hi-Hat (1954)

Professional ratings
Review scores
Source	Rating
Allmusic	4.5/5 stars
The Rolling Stone Jazz Record Guide	4/5 stars
The Penguin Guide to Jazz Recordings	3/4 stars

Kaleidoscope is an album by saxophonist Sonny Stitt compiling tracks recorded in 1950-52 and released on the Prestige label in 1957. The 1991 CD reissue added four bonus tracks to the original LP.

== Reception ==
The Allmusic review stated "Deftly handling the alto, tenor, and baritone saxophone, bebop giant Sonny Stitt is heard to perfection here on a variety of early-'50s dates. Stitt not only shows off his patented speed throughout, but he goes a long way in dispelling criticisms of him being all fire and no grace".

== Track listing ==
All compositions by Sonny Stitt and Bill Massey except as indicated

1. "Stitt's It" – 2:35
2. "Cool Mambo" – 2:40
3. "Blue Mambo" – 2:25
4. "Sonny Sounds" – 2:29
5. "Ain't Misbehavin'" (Harry Brooks, Andy Razaf, Fats Waller) – 3:02
6. "Later" (Sonny Stitt) – 3:00
7. "P.S. I Love You" (Gordon Jenkins, Johnny Mercer) – 3:00
8. "This Can't Be Love" (Lorenz Hart, Richard Rodgers) – 2:47
9. "Imagination" (Johnny Burke, Jimmy Van Heusen) – 3:24
10. "Cherokee" (Ray Noble) – 2:33
11. "Can't We Be Friends" (Paul James, Kay Swift) – 2:41
12. "Liza (All the Clouds'll Roll Away)" (George Gershwin, Ira Gershwin, Gus Kahn) – 2:45
13. "To Think You've Chosen Me" (Bennie Benjamin, George David Weiss) – 3:11 Bonus track on CD reissue
14. "After You've Gone" (Henry Creamer, Turner Layton) – 2:25 Bonus track on CD reissue
15. "Our Very Own" (Jack Elliott, Victor Young) – 3:05 Bonus track on CD reissue
16. "'S Wonderful" (George Gershwin, Ira Gershwin) – 2:24 Bonus track on CD reissue
- Recorded in New York City on February 17, 1950 (tracks 5 & 6), October 8, 1950 (tracks 13–16), December 15, 1950 (tracks 9 & 10), January 31, 1951 (tracks 11 & 12), February 1, 1951 (tracks 7 & 8) and February 25, 1952 (tracks 1–4)

== Personnel ==
- Sonny Stitt – tenor saxophone (tracks 1–6 & 13–16), baritone saxophone (tracks 7–8), alto saxophone (tracks 9–12)
- John Hunt (tracks 1–4), Bill Massey (tracks 1–4 & 13–16), Joe Newman (tracks 1–4) – trumpet
- Matthew Gee – trombone (tracks 13–16)
- Gene Ammons – baritone saxophone (tracks 13–16)
- Charlie Bateman (tracks 7, 8, 11 & 12), Kenny Drew (tracks 5 & 6), John Houston (tracks 1–4), Junior Mance (tracks 9–16) – piano
- Tommy Potter (tracks 5 & 6), Ernie Shepherd (tracks 1–4), Gene Wright (tracks 7–16) – bass
- Art Blakey (tracks 5, 6, 9 & 10), Wes Landers (tracks 13–16), Teddy Stewart (tracks 7, 8, 11 & 12), Shadow Wilson (tracks 1–4) – drums
- Humberto Molares – congas (tracks 1–4)
- Larry Townsend – vocals (tracks 13–16)
