= Carol Ventura =

- Born: 1939; Newark, New Jersey, United States
- Origin: United States
- Died: March 5, 2010
- Genres: Rock'n'roll, pop, pop-jazz
- Occupation: Singer
- Labels: Prestige

Carol Ventura (1939 – March 5, 2010) was an American jazz singer who recorded two albums for Prestige Records in 1964 and 1965.

Releasing her debut long-play Carol!, the label hoped she would "crack the pop-jazz field". "We're going after the crowd which digs Henry Mancini and Barbra Streisand," Bob Kirstein, Western sales manager for Prestige, told Billboard. The magazine reviewed the album, writing: "Here's a singer to watch. After a start a few years ago as a rock 'n' roller, Carol now seems to have developed a pattern that makes her a singer of high style. Working with arrangements by Benny Golson, Miss Ventura has come forth with a set of unusual quality."

== Discography ==
=== Studio albums ===
- Carol! (1964)
- I Love to Sing (1965)
