= Blue Stompin' =

Studio album by Hal Singer
- Released: 1959
- Recorded: February 20, 1959
- Studio: Van Gelder Studio, Hackensack, NJ
- Genre: Jazz
- Length: 38:36
- Label: Prestige; PRLP 7153
- Producer: Esmond Edwards

Hal Singer chronology
Rent Party (1948-56)	Blue Stompin' (1959)	Blues in the Night (1963)

Blue Stompin' is an album by the saxophonist Hal Singer with trumpeter Charlie Shavers that was recorded in 1959 for the Prestige label.

== Reception ==
Professional ratings
Review scores
Source	Rating
AllMusic	4/5 stars

The AllMusic review by Scott Yanow stated: "This is a fun set of heated swing with early R&B overtones ... there are many fine moments on this enjoyable set. Recommended".

== Track listing ==
All compositions by Hal Singer and Eli Robinson, except where indicated.

1. "Blue Stompin'" – 6:28
2. "Windy" (Charlie Shavers) – 6:52
3. "With a Song in My Heart" (Richard Rodgers, Lorenz Hart) – 5:03
4. "Midnight" – 11:05
5. "Fancy Pants" (Shavers) – 4:32
6. "The Blast Off" – 4:36

== Personnel ==
- Hal Singer – tenor saxophone
- Charlie Shavers – trumpet
- Ray Bryant – piano
- Wendell Marshall - bass
- Osie Johnson - drums
