= Tiny in Swingville =

1959 studio album by Tiny Grimes with Jerome Richardson

Studio album by Tiny Grimes with Jerome Richardson
- Released: 1959
- Recorded: August 13, 1959
- Studio: Van Gelder Studio, Englewood Cliffs, New Jersey
- Genre: Jazz
- Length: 39:59
- Label: Swingville; SV 2002
- Producer: Esmond Edwards

Tiny Grimes chronology
Callin' the Blues (1958)	Tiny in Swingville (1959)	Some Groovy Fours (1974)

Professional ratings
Review scores
Source	Rating
Allmusic	4.5/5 stars
The Penguin Guide to Jazz Recordings	3/4 stars

Tiny in Swingville is an album by guitarist Tiny Grimes with saxophonist Jerome Richardson recorded in 1959 and released on the Swingville label.

== Reception ==
The Allmusic site awarded the album 4½ stars stating "it really puts the focus on Grimes' bluish but swinging guitar playing".

== Track listing ==
All compositions by Doretta Crawley and Tiny Grimes except where noted

1. "Annie Laurie" (Alicia Scott) - 6:57
2. "Home Sick" - 8:54
3. "Frankie and Johnny" (Traditional) - 3:50
4. "Down With It" - 8:58
5. "Ain't Misbehavin'" (Harry Brooks, Andy Razaf, Fats Waller) - 7:05
6. "Durn Tootin'" (Grimes) - 4:28

== Personnel ==
- Tiny Grimes - guitar
- Jerome Richardson - tenor saxophone, baritone saxophone, flute
- Ray Bryant - piano
- Wendell Marshall - bass
- Art Taylor - drums
