= Callin' the Blues =

Studio album by Tiny Grimes with J. C. Higginbotham
- Released: 1958
- Recorded: July 18, 1958
- Studio: Van Gelder Studio, Hackensack, New Jersey
- Genre: Jazz
- Length: 39:09
- Label: Prestige; PR 7144
- Producer: Esmond Edwards

Tiny Grimes chronology
Blues Groove (1958)	Callin' the Blues (1958)	Tiny in Swingville (1959)

Professional ratings
Review scores
Source	Rating
Allmusic	4/5 stars
The Penguin Guide to Jazz Recordings	3/4 stars

Callin' the Blues is an album by guitarist Tiny Grimes with trombonist J. C. Higginbotham recorded in 1958 and released on the Prestige label. The album was rereleased on Prestige's Swingville subsidiary label.

== Reception ==
The Allmusic site awarded the album 4 stars stating "Although J.C., who had a long decline, sounds a bit past his prime, plenty of sparks fly throughout the date, particularly from Grimes and Lockjaw".

== Track listing ==
All compositions by Tiny Grimes except where noted.

1. "Callin' the Blues" – 8:42
2. "Blue Tiny" – 11:34
3. "Grimes' Times" – 11:20
4. "Air Mail Special" (Charlie Christian, Benny Goodman, Jimmy Mundy) – 7:33

== Personnel ==
- Tiny Grimes – guitar
- J. C. Higginbotham – trombone
- Eddie "Lockjaw" Davis – tenor saxophone
- Ray Bryant – piano
- Wendell Marshall – bass
- Osie Johnson – drums
