= Other Sounds =

Studio album by Yusef Lateef
- Released: 1959
- Recorded: October 11, 1957
- Studio: Van Gelder, Hackensack, New Jersey
- Genre: Jazz
- Length: 36:22
- Label: New Jazz; NJLP 8218
- Producer: Bob Weinstock

Yusef Lateef chronology
The Sounds of Yusef (1957)	Other Sounds (1959)	Lateef at Cranbrook (1958)

Other Sounds (also released as Expression!) is an album by multi-instrumentalist Yusef Lateef, recorded in 1957 and released on the New Jazz label.

== Reception ==
Professional ratings
Review scores
Source	Rating
AllMusic	4/5 stars
The Penguin Guide to Jazz Recordings	3/4 stars

The AllMusic review stated: "Other Sounds was the first album on which Yusef Lateef looked beyond the confines of jazz and popular music to hear and perhaps 'sing' the music he heard from the East".

== Track listing ==
All compositions by Yusef Lateef except as indicated

1. "All Alone" (Irving Berlin) - 5:02
2. "Anastasia" (Alfred Newman) - 4:12
3. "Minor Mood" - 9:32
4. "Taboo" (Margarita Lecuona, Bob Russell) - 9:11
5. "Lambert's Point" (Wilbur Harden) - 4:41
6. "Mahaba" - 3:44

== Personnel ==
- Yusef Lateef - tenor saxophone, flute, tambourine, argol
- Wilbur Harden - flugelhorn, balloon
- Hugh Lawson - piano, Turkish finger cymbals, 7 Up bottle, balloon, bells
- Ernie Farrow - bass, rabat
- Oliver Jackson - drums, gong, earthboard
