= Sonny Stitt/Bud Powell/J. J. Johnson =

Compilation album by Sonny Stitt
- Released: 1956
- Recorded: October 17 and December 11, 1949 and January 26, 1950; New York City
- Genre: Jazz
- Length: 50:28
- Label: Prestige; PRLP 7024

Sonny Stitt chronology
| Sonny Stitt/Bud Powell/J. J. Johnson (1956) | Stitt's Bits (1950) |

Professional ratings
Review scores
| Source | Rating |
|---|---|
| Allmusic | 4.5/5 stars |
| Disc | 4/5 stars |
| The Penguin Guide to Jazz Recordings | 3/4 stars |

Sonny Stitt/Bud Powell/J. J. Johnson (also released as All God's Children Got Rhythm) is an album by saxophonist Sonny Stitt compiling tracks recorded with trombonist J. J. Johnson or pianist Bud Powell in 1949–50 and released on the Prestige label in 1956. The 1990 CD reissue added five bonus tracks to the original LP. The cover art was done by cartoonist Don Martin of MAD magazine fame.

== Reception ==
The Allmusic review stated "This superb CD reissues the complete output of three classic bop sessions... Highly recommended music".

== Track listing ==
All compositions by Sonny Stitt except as indicated

1. "All God's Chillun Got Rhythm" (Walter Jurmann, Gus Kahn, Bronisław Kaper) – 2:57
2. "Sonnyside" – 2:21
3. "Bud's Blues" – 2:32
4. "Sunset" – 3:44
5. "Fine and Dandy" (Paul James, Kay Swift) – 2:39
6. "Fine and Dandy" [alternate take] (James, Swift) – 2:38 Bonus track on CD reissue
7. "Strike Up the Band" (George Gershwin, Ira Gershwin) – 3:26
8. "I Want to Be Happy" (Irving Caesar, Vincent Youmans) – 3:09
9. "Taking a Chance on Love" (Vernon Duke, Ted Fetter, John Latouche) – 2:32
10. "Afternoon in Paris" (John Lewis) – 3:03
11. "Afternoon in Paris" [alternate take] (Lewis) – 2:59 Bonus track on CD reissue
12. "Elora" (J.J. Johnson) – 3:03
13. "Elora" [alternate take] (Johnson) – 3:07 Bonus track on CD reissue
14. "Teapot" (Johnson) – 2:43
15. "Teapot" [alternate take] (Johnson) – 3:01 Bonus track on CD reissue
16. "Blue Mode" (Johnson) – 3:45
17. "Blue Mode" [alternate take] (Johnson) – 2:49 Bonus track on CD reissue
- Recorded in New York City on October 17, 1949 (tracks 10–17), December 11, 1949 (tracks 1–4) and January 26, 1950 (tracks 5–9)

== Personnel ==
- Sonny Stitt – tenor saxophone
- J. J. Johnson – trombone (tracks 10–17)
- John Lewis (tracks 10–17), Bud Powell (tracks 1–9) – piano
- Nelson Boyd (tracks 10–17), Curly Russell (tracks 1–9) – bass
- Max Roach – drums
