= Hawk Eyes (album) =

Studio album by Coleman Hawkins
- Released: 1959
- Recorded: April 3, 1959
- Studios: Van Gelder, Hackensack, New Jersey
- Genre: Jazz
- Length: 45:10
- Labels: Prestige; PR 7156
- Producer: Bob Weinstock

Coleman Hawkins chronology
Soul (1958)	Hawk Eyes (1959)	Coleman Hawkins with the Red Garland Trio (1959)

Hawk Eyes is an album by saxophonist Coleman Hawkins which was recorded in 1959 and released on the Prestige label.

== Reception ==
Professional ratings
Review scores
Source	Rating
Allmusic	4/5 stars
The Rolling Stone Jazz Record Guide	3/5 stars
The Penguin Guide to Jazz Recordings	3/4 stars

Allmusic awarded the album 4 stars stating "in addition to long jams, plenty of fireworks occur during this frequently exciting session".

== Track listing ==
All compositions by Coleman Hawkins except as indicated

1. "Hawk Eyes" - 10:19
2. "C'mon In" - 13:17
3. "Through for the Night" (Trummy Young) - 5:12
4. "I Never Knew" (Ted Fio Rito, Gus Kahn) - 5:42
5. "La Rosita" (Paul Dupont, Allan Stuart) - 6:09
6. Stealin' the Bean"" (Osie Johnson) - 4:31

== Personnel ==
- Coleman Hawkins - tenor saxophone
- Charlie Shavers - trumpet (tracks 1–4 & 6)
- Ray Bryant - piano
- Tiny Grimes - guitar (tracks 1–4 & 6)
- George Duvivier - bass
- Osie Johnson - drums
