= Party Time (Arnett Cobb album) =

Studio album by Arnett Cobb
- Released: 1959
- Recorded: May 14, 1959; Van Gelder Studio, Hackensack
- Genre: Jazz
- Length: 37:00
- Label: Prestige; PRLP 7165
- Producer: Esmond Edwards

Arnett Cobb chronology
Smooth Sailing (1959)	Party Time (1959)	More Party Time (1960)

Professional ratings
Review scores
Source	Rating
Allmusic	4/5 stars
DownBeat	2/5 stars
The Penguin Guide to Jazz Recordings	2.5/4 stars

Party Time is an album by saxophonist Arnett Cobb recorded in 1959 for the Prestige label.

== Reception ==
The Allmusic review awarded the album 4 stars and stated "most of the focus is on Cobb's tough yet flexible tenor... Highly recommended".

== Track listing ==
All compositions by Arnett Cobb except as indicated

1. "When My Dreamboat Comes Home" (Dave Franklin, Cliff Friend) - 5:48
2. "Lonesome Road" (Gene Austin, Nathaniel Shilkret) - 3:57
3. "Blues in the Closet" (Oscar Pettiford) - 4:20
4. "Party Time" - 5:55
5. "Flying Home" (Benny Goodman, Lionel Hampton, Eddie DeLange, Sid Robin) - 5:14
6. "The Slow Poke" - 6:52
7. "Cocktails for Two" (Sam Coslow, Arthur Johnston) - 5:14

== Personnel ==
- Arnett Cobb - tenor saxophone
- Ray Bryant - piano
- Wendell Marshall - bass
- Art Taylor - drums
- Ray Barretto - congas
