= The Sounds of Yusef =

Studio album by Yusef Lateef
- Released: March 1958
- Recorded: October 11, 1957
- Studio: Van Gelder, Hackensack, New Jersey
- Genre: Jazz
- Length: 31:19
- Label: Prestige; PRLP 7122
- Producer: Bob Weinstock

Yusef Lateef chronology
Prayer to the East (1957)	The Sounds of Yusef (1958)	Other Sounds (1957)

The Sounds of Yusef is an album by multi-instrumentalist Yusef Lateef, recorded in 1957 and released on the Prestige label.

== Reception ==
Professional ratings
Review scores
Source	Rating
AllMusic	3/5 stars
DownBeat	2.5/5 stars

The AllMusic review stated: "The Sounds of Yusef manages to chart some new territory amid his sea of late-'50s recordings. Many of the songs tilt their head toward the East, both rhythmically and in their instrumentation, but the album as a whole still has its feet firmly planted in the jazz tradition".

== Track listing ==
All compositions by Yusef Lateef, except as indicated

1. "Take the "A" Train" (Billy Strayhorn) - 11:10
2. "Playful Flute" (Wilbur Harden) - 4:15
3. "Love and Humor" - 6:08
4. "Buckingham" - 5:06
5. "Meditation" - 4:40

== Personnel ==
- Yusef Lateef - tenor saxophone, flute, tambourine, argol
- Wilbur Harden - flugelhorn, balloon
- Hugh Lawson - piano, Turkish finger cymbals, 7 Up bottle, balloon, bells
- Ernie Farrow - bass, rabat
- Oliver Jackson - drums, gong, earthboard
