= Soul (Coleman Hawkins album) =

Studio album by Coleman Hawkins
- Released: March 1959
- Recorded: November 7, 1958; Van Gelder Studio, Hackensack
- Genre: Jazz
- Length: 41:21
- Labels: Prestige; PRLP 7149
- Producer: Esmond Edwards

Coleman Hawkins chronology
Bean Bags (1958)	Soul (1959)	Hawk Eyes (1959)

Soul is an album by saxophonist Coleman Hawkins that was recorded in 1958 and released on the Prestige label.

== Reception ==
Professional ratings
Review scores
Source	Rating
Allmusic	2.5/5 stars
The Penguin Guide to Jazz Recordings	3.5/4 stars

AllMusic awarded the album 2½ stars, stating: "This is a decent but not very exciting outing. Then 52, Hawkins uses a typically young rhythm section and plays melodically on a variety of originals and standards."

== Track listing ==
All compositions by Coleman Hawkins except as indicated

1. "Soul Blues" - 9:52
2. "I Hadn't Anyone Till You" (Ray Noble) - 4:34
3. "Groovin'" (Kenny Burrell) - 5:43
4. "Greensleeves" (Traditional) - 3:12
5. "Sunday Mornin'" (Burrell) - 6:29
6. "Until the Real Thing Comes Along" (Sammy Cahn, Saul Chaplin, L. E. Freeman, Mann Holiner, Alberta Nichols) - 4:42
7. "Sweetnin'" - 6:49

== Personnel ==
- Coleman Hawkins - tenor saxophone
- Ray Bryant - piano
- Kenny Burrell - guitar
- Wendell Marshall - bass
- Osie Johnson - drums
