= Smooth Sailing (Arnett Cobb album) =

Studio album by Arnett Cobb
- Released: 1960
- Recorded: February 27, 1959
- Studio: Van Gelder Studio, Hackensack, NJ
- Genre: Jazz
- Length: 36:30
- Label: Prestige; PRLP 7184
- Producer: Esmond Edwards

Arnett Cobb chronology
Blow Arnett, Blow (1959)	Smooth Sailing (1960)	Party Time (1959)

Smooth Sailing is an album by the saxophonist Arnett Cobb recorded in 1959 for the Prestige label and released in 1960.

== Reception ==
Professional ratings
Review scores
Source	Rating
Allmusic	3/5 stars
The Penguin Guide to Jazz Recordings	3/4 stars

The Allmusic review awarded the album 3 stars and stated: "Arnett Cobb's solos are typically emotional and generally exciting during the fine set".

== Track listing ==
All compositions by Arnett Cobb except where noted

1. "Charmaine" (Erno Rapee, Lew Pollack) – 4:23
2. "Cobb's Mob" (George Duvivier) – 4:44
3. "I Don't Stand a Ghost of a Chance with You" (Bing Crosby, Ned Washington, Victor Young) – 4:44
4. "Let's Split" – 3:44
5. "Blues Around Dusk" (Osie Johnson) – 8:18
6. "Smooth Sailing" – 5:01
7. "(I'm Left with the) Blues in My Heart" (Irving Mills, Benny Carter) – 5:36

== Personnel ==
- Arnett Cobb – tenor saxophone
- Buster Cooper – trombone
- Austin Mitchell – organ
- George Duvivier – bass
- Osie Johnson – drums
