= More Party Time =

Studio album by Arnett Cobb
- Released: 1960
- Recorded: February 16 & 17, 1960; Van Gelder Studio, Englewood Cliffs, New Jersey
- Genre: Jazz
- Length: 36:25
- Label: Prestige; PRLP 7175
- Producer: Esmond Edwards

Arnett Cobb chronology
| Party Time (1959) | More Party Time (1960) | Movin' Right Along (1960) |

Professional ratings
Review scores
| Source | Rating |
|---|---|
| AllMusic | 4.5/5 stars |
| The Penguin Guide to Jazz Recordings | 3/4 stars |

More Party Time is an album by jazz tenor saxophonist Arnett Cobb recorded in 1960 for the Prestige label.

== Reception ==
The AllMusic review awarded the album 4½ stars and called it "melodic, soulful, and swinging. An excellent if brief (at 36 minutes) effort".

== Track listing ==
All compositions by Arnett Cobb except as indicated

1. "Lover, Come Back to Me" (Oscar Hammerstein II, Sigmund Romberg) - 8:57
2. "Blue Lou" (Irving Mills, Edgar Sampson) - 3:41
3. "Swanee River" (Stephen Foster) - 5:52
4. "Down by the Riverside" (trad) - 5:22
5. "Blue Me" - 7:36
6. "Sometimes I'm Happy" (Irving Caesar, Vincent Youmans) - 5:13
- Recorded at Van Gelder Studio in Englewood Cliffs, New Jersey, on February 16 (tracks 1–3, 5 & 6) and February 17 (track 4), 1960.

== Personnel ==
- Arnett Cobb - tenor saxophone
- Tommy Flanagan (tracks 1–3, 5 & 6), Bobby Timmons (track 4) - piano
- Sam Jones - bass
- Art Taylor - drums
- Danny Barrajanos (tracks 1–3, 5 & 6), Buck Clarke (track 4) - congas
