= Stitt's Bits =

Compilation album by Sonny Stitt
- Released: 1958
- Recorded: February 17, June 28, October 8 and December 15, 1950; New York City
- Genre: Jazz
- Label: Prestige; PRLP 7133
- Producer: Bob Weinstock

Sonny Stitt chronology
Sonny Stitt/Bud Powell/J. J. Johnson (1949–50)	Stitt's Bits (1958)	Kaleidoscope (1950–52)

Professional ratings
Review scores
Source	Rating
Allmusic	3/5 stars
The Rolling Stone Jazz Record Guide	4/5 stars

Stitt's Bits is an album by saxophonist Sonny Stitt compiling tracks recorded in 1950 and released on the Prestige label in 1958.

== Reception ==
The Allmusic review awarded the album 3 stars.

== Track listing ==
1. "Avalon" (Buddy DeSylva, Al Jolson, Vincent Rose) – 2:26
2. "Mean to Me" (Fred E. Ahlert, Roy Turk) – 3:04
3. "Stairway to the Stars" (Matty Malneck, Frank Signorelli, Mitchell Parish) – 3:12
4. "Count Every Star" (Sammy Gallop, Bruno Coquatrix) – 2:57
5. "Nice Work If You Can Get It" (George Gershwin, Ira Gershwin) – 2:37
6. "There Will Never Be Another You" (Harry Warren, Mack Gordon) – 2:32
7. "Blazin'" (Sonny Stitt) – 3:22
8. "After You've Gone" (Turner Layton, Henry Creamer) – 2:25
9. "Our Very Own" (Jack Elliott, Victor Young) – 3:05
10. "'S Wonderful" (George Gershwin, Ira Gershwin) – 2:24
11. "Jeepers Creepers" (Warren, Johnny Mercer) – 2:54
12. "Nevertheless" (Harry Ruby, Bert Kalmar) – 2:49
- Recorded in New York City on February 17, 1950 (tracks 1–3), June 28, 1950 (tracks 4–7), October 8, 1950 (tracks 8–10) and December 15, 1950 (tracks 11 & 12)

== Personnel ==
- Sonny Stitt – tenor saxophone
- Bill Massey – trumpet (tracks 8–10)
- Matthew Gee – trombone (tracks 8–10)
- Gene Ammons – baritone saxophone (tracks 8–10)
- Kenny Drew (tracks 1–3), Duke Jordan (tracks 4–7), Junior Mance (tracks 8–12) – piano
- Tommy Potter (tracks 1–3), Gene Wright (tracks 4–12) – bass
- Art Blakey (tracks 1–3, 11 & 12), Wes Landers (tracks 4–10) – drums
