= Bean Bags =

Studio album by Milt Jackson and Coleman Hawkins
- Released: 1959
- Recorded: September 12, 1958; New York City
- Genre: Jazz
- Length: 36:08
- Label: Atlantic
- Producer: Nesuhi Ertegun

Milt Jackson chronology
The Modern Jazz Quartet at Music Inn Volume 2 (1959)	Bean Bags (1959)	Bags' Opus (1959)

Coleman Hawkins chronology
The Saxophone Section (1958)	Bean Bags (1959)	Soul (1958)

Bean Bags is an album by vibraphonist Milt Jackson and saxophonist Coleman Hawkins featuring performances recorded in 1958 and released on the Atlantic label.

== Reception ==
The Allmusic review by Scott Yanow awarded the album 4 stars, stating: "Many of vibraphonist Milt Jackson's Atlantic recordings are long overdue to appear on CD, and that certainly includes Bean Bags, which features a meeting with the great tenor Coleman Hawkins. Assisted by a top-notch quartet."

Professional ratings
Review scores
Source	Rating
Allmusic	4/5 stars

== Track listing ==
All compositions by Milt Jackson except as indicated

1. "Close Your Eyes" (Bernice Petkere) - 7:25
2. "Stuffy" (Coleman Hawkins) - 5:41
3. "Don't Take Your Love From Me" (Henry Nemo) - 4:49
4. "Get Happy" (Harold Arlen, Ted Koehler) - 5:28
5. "Sandra's Blues" - 6:38
6. "Indian Blues" - 6:07

== Personnel ==
- Milt Jackson – vibes
- Coleman Hawkins – tenor saxophone
- Tommy Flanagan – piano
- Kenny Burrell – guitar
- Eddie Jones – bass
- Connie Kay – drums
