= Soulnik =

Studio album by Doug Watkins
- Released: 1960
- Recorded: May 17, 1960
- Studio: Van Gelder Studio, Englewood Cliffs, New Jersey
- Genre: Jazz
- Length: 37:31
- Label: New Jazz; NJLP 8238
- Producer: Esmond Edwards

Doug Watkins chronology
Doug Watkins at Large (1956)	Soulnik (1960)

Soulnik is the second of two albums led by American jazz bassist Doug Watkins featuring tracks recorded in 1960 and released on the New Jazz label.

== Reception ==
Professional ratings
Review scores
Source	Rating
Allmusic	4/5 stars
The Penguin Guide to Jazz Recordings	3/4 stars

Scott Yanow of Allmusic states, "The use of oboe and cello on some numbers makes the date stand out a bit from the usual hard bop sessions of the period and straight-ahead jazz fans will want to get this".

== Track listing ==
All compositions by Yusef Lateef except as indicated

1. "One Guy" - 6:17
2. "Confessin' (That I Love You)" (Doc Daugherty, Al J. Neiburg, Ellis Reynolds) - 6:47
3. "Soulnik" - 5:44
4. "Andre's Bag" (Doug Watkins) - 6:58
5. "I Remember You" (Johnny Mercer, Victor Schertzinger) - 5:35
6. "Imagination" (Johnny Burke, Jimmy Van Heusen) - 6:10

== Personnel ==
- Doug Watkins - cello
- Yusef Lateef - tenor saxophone, flute, oboe
- Hugh Lawson - piano
- Herman Wright - bass
- Lex Humphries - drums
