= J. C. Higginbotham =

American jazz trombonist (1906–1973)

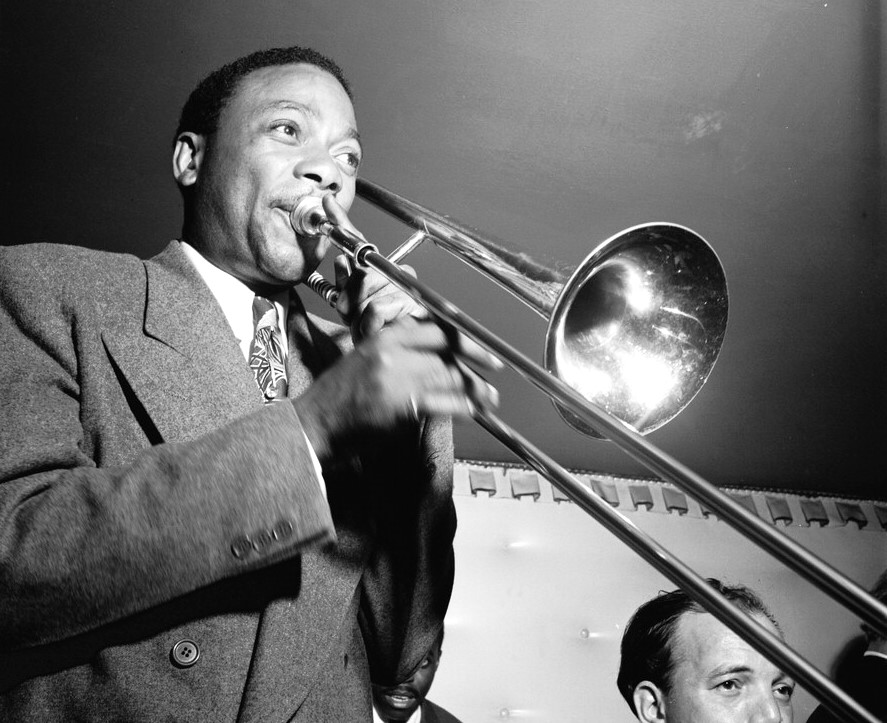
- J. C. Higginbotham (ca. 1946-1948)

Background information
- Born: May 11, 1906; Social Circle, Georgia, U.S.
- Died: May 26, 1973 (aged 67) New York, U.S.
- Genres: Jazz
- Instrument: Trombone
- Label: Prestige

J. (Jack) C. Higginbotham (May 11, 1906 – May 26, 1973) was an American jazz trombonist. His playing was robust and swinging.

== Biography ==
He was born in Social Circle, Georgia, United States, and raised in Cincinnati, Ohio. In the 1930s and 1940s, he played with some of the premier swing bands, including Luis Russell's, Benny Carter's, Red Allen's, Chick Webb's, Fletcher Henderson's, and Mills Blue Rhythm Band. He also played with Louis Armstrong, who had taken over Russell's band from 1937 to 1940. From 1947 on, he chiefly led his own groups. He recorded extensively both as a sideman and as a leader. He played for a long period in the 1940s with his ideal partner Red Allen, and then disappeared from the scene for several years.

Higginbotham led several bands in the 1950s in Boston and Cleveland, appeared regularly at the Metropole in New York between 1956 and 1959, and led his own Dixieland band there in the 1960s. He also appeared on the DuMont series Jazz Party (1958), aired on WNTA-TV.

During the tenure with Luis Russell on February 5, 1930, a single session was issued under the name of J.C. Higgenbotham and His Six Hicks was issued on OKeh 8772, featuring "Give Me Your Telephone Number" and "Higgenbotham Blues." Musicians included Henry Allen, Higgenbotham, Charlie Holmes, Luis Russell, Will Hognson, Pops Foster and Paul Barbarin, all member of Russell's band.

He went on his first European tour with Sammy Price, appearing in Scandinavia, and worked once again briefly in 1964 with Louis Armstrong.

He died on May 26, 1973, in Manhattan, New York City, at Harlem Hospital.

== Discography ==
=== As leader ===
- Callin' the Blues with Tiny Grimes (Prestige, 1958)
- Higgy Comes Home (Jazzology, 1979)

=== As sideman ===
- Red Allen, Red Allen, Kid Ory & Jack Teagarden at Newport (Verve, 1957)
- Red Allen's All Stars, Ride, Red, Ride in Hi-Fi (RCA Victor, 1957)
- Kenny Burrell & Bill Jennings & Tiny Grimes, Guitar Soul (Status, 1965)
- Buck Clayton, All the Cats Join In (Columbia, 1956)
- Fletcher Henderson All Stars/Rex Stewart, The Big Reunion (Jazztone, 1958)
- Coleman Hawkins, Things Ain't What They Used to Be (Swingville, 1961)
- Alberta Hunter & Lucille Hegamin & Victoria Spivey, Songs We Taught Your Mother (Prestige, Bluesville, 1962)
- James P. Johnson, Father of the Stride Piano (CBS, 1965)
- Pete Johnson, Pete's Blues (Savoy, 1958)
- Cootie Williams & Rex Stewart, The Big Challenge (Jazztone, 1957)
- Jimmy Witherspoon, Goin' to Kansas City Blues (RCA Victor, 1958)
