= Bennie Green Blows His Horn =

Studio album by Bennie Green
- Released: 1955
- Recorded: June 10 and September 22, 1955
- Studio: Van Gelder Studio, Hackensack, New Jersey
- Genre: Jazz
- Length: 39:07
- Label: Prestige

Bennie Green chronology
Bennie Green with Strings (1956)	Bennie Green Blows His Horn (1955)	Bennie Green Sextet (1956)

Bennie Green Blows His Horn is an album by American trombonist Bennie Green. It was recorded in 1955 and released on the Prestige label.

== Reception ==
Professional ratings
Review scores
Source	Rating
AllMusic	4.5/5 stars

The AllMusic review by Scott Yanow stated that "Green and his band show that there is no reason that swinging jazz has to be viewed as overly intellectual and esoteric... a fine example of Bennie Green's talents and winning musical personality."

== Track listing ==
All compositions by Bennie Green, except where indicated.

1. "Sometimes I'm Happy" (Vincent Youmans, Irving Caesar) – 3:53
2. "Laura" (David Raksin, Johnny Mercer) – 6:13
3. "Body and Soul" (Edward Heyman, Robert Sour, Frank Eyton, Johnny Green) – 6:58
4. "Say Jack!" (Green, Osie Johnson) – 3:36
5. "One Track" (Green, Johnson) – 3:15
6. "Groovin' the Blues" [Take 1] – 5:31
7. "Groovin' the Blues" [Take 2] – 3:13
8. "Travelin' Light" (Harry Akst, Sidney Clare) – 3:07
9. "Hi-Yo Silver" (Green, Johnson) – 3:21
- Recorded on June 10, 1955 (tracks 1–4) and September 22, 1955 (tracks 5–9).

== Personnel ==
- Bennie Green – trombone, vocals
- Charlie Rouse – tenor saxophone
- Cliff Smalls – piano
- Paul Chambers – bass
- Osie Johnson – drums
- Candido Camero – conga (tracks 1–4)
