= Sherman Ferguson =

American drummer

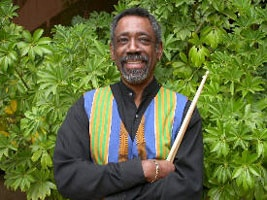

Background information
- Birth name: Sherman Eugene Ferguson
- Born: October 31, 1944; Philadelphia, Pennsylvania, U.S.
- Died: January 22, 2006 (aged 61); La Crescenta, California
- Genres: Jazz
- Occupation(s): Musician, writer
- Instrument: Drums
- Years active: 1960s–2000s
- Labels: ITI, Muse
- Formerly of: Catalyst, Heard Ranier Ferguson

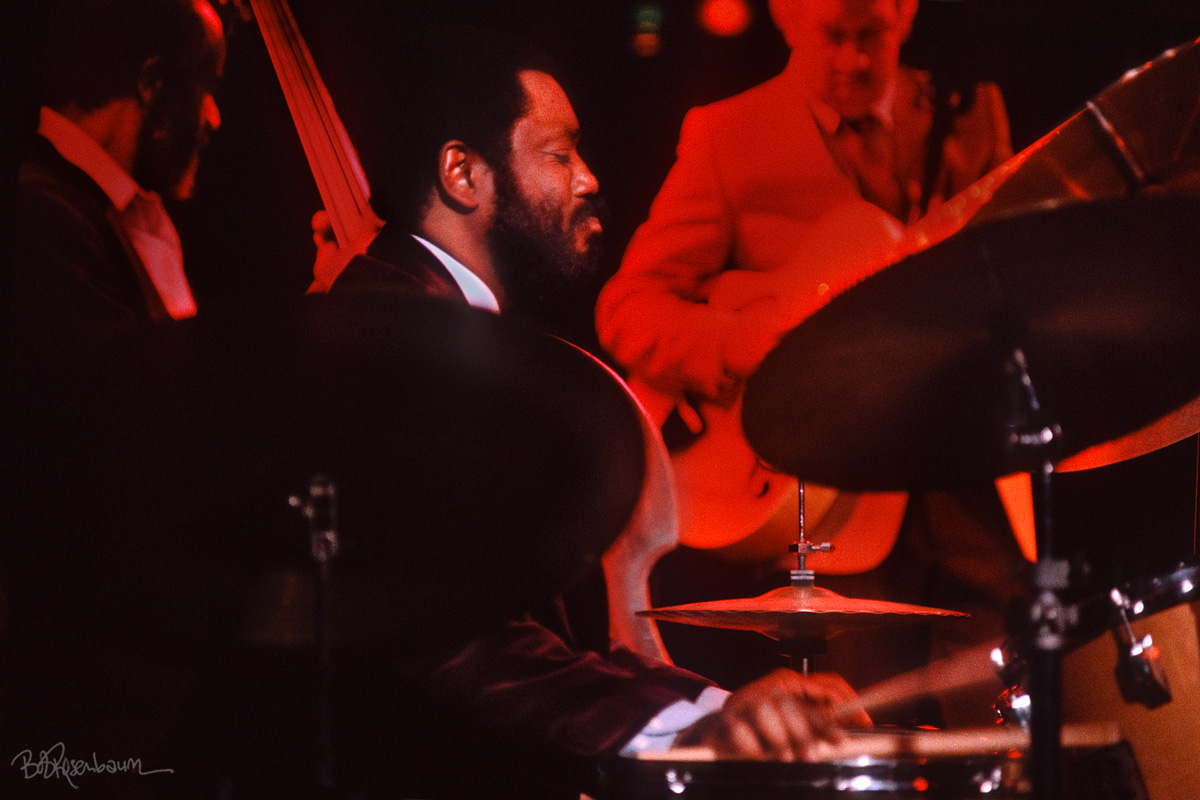
Drummer Sherman Ferguson with guitarist Kenny Burrell and bassist John Heard in Los Angeles, California, 1984

Sherman Eugene Ferguson (October 31, 1944 – January 22, 2006) was an American jazz drummer. For a time he was a member of the jazz trio Heard Ranier Ferguson.

== Background ==
Ferguson once said that when people asked him what he did, he wouldn't tell them he was a musician, he'd say he was a jazz musician. He said he was proud of it and he would wear it as a statement on his forehead if he could.

He also wrote liner notes and was a contributing writer. He wrote liner notes and articles for jazz magazines such as Bird and L.A. Jazz Scene.

Ferguson first played professionally around 1963, working with Charles Earland, Shirley Scott, Don Patterson, and Groove Holmes. he also recorded frequently with Pat Martino. Concomitantly he worked as a child tutor for the Model Cities program in Philadelphia. He was a founding member of Catalyst, a jazz fusion ensemble, in 1970, remaining with them until their breakup. He then moved to Los Angeles, where he became a prolific session musician, playing on albums by Dizzy Gillespie, Horace Silver, and Benny Carter among many others. He formed a trio with John Heard and Tom Ranier. He taught jazz theory at UCLA, UC-Irvine, and Jackson State University. He released the album Welcome to My Vision, on his own label Jazz-a-nance in 2002. Among the tracks on the album were "Lush Life", "Lester Left Town" and Bobby Watson's "Monk He See, Monk He Do". The band comprised Ferguson on drums, saxophonists Louis Van Taylor and Carl Randall and bassist Trevor Ware.

On January 22, 2006, Ferguson died at his La Crescenta home aged 61. The death was a result of diabetes.

== Discography ==
=== As leader ===
- Sherman Ferguson's Jazz Union, Welcome to My Vision

With Catalyst

- Catalyst (Cobblestone, 1972)
- Perception (Muse, 1973)
- Unity (Muse, 1974)
- A Tear and a Smile (Muse, 1976)
- Heard Ranier Ferguson (ITI, 1983)

=== As sideman ===
With Kenny Burrell

- Handcrafted (Muse, 1978)
- Kenny Burrell Live at the Village Vanguard (Muse, 1978 [1980])
- Kenny Burrell in New York (Muse, 1978 [1981])
- Then Along Came Kenny (Evidence, 1993 [1996])

With George Cables

- Morning Song (HighNote, 1980 [2008])

With Benny Carter

- Another Time, Another Place (Evening Star, 1996) with Phil Woods
- Benny Carter Songbook (MusicMasters, 1996)
- New York Nights (MusicMasters 1997)
- Benny Carter Songbook Volume II (MusicMasters, 1997)

With Warne Marsh

- Two Days in the Life of... (Interplay, 1987)

With Pat Martino

- Desperado (Prestige, 1970)
- Pat Martino/Live! (Muse, 1972 [1974])
- Consciousness (Muse, 1974)
- Interchange (Muse, 1994)

With Tete Montoliu

- Carmina (Jazzizz, 1984)

With Pharoah Sanders

- Crescent with Love (Evidence/Venus, 1992)
- Ballads with Love (Venus, 1992)

With Bud Shank

- California Concert (Contemporary, 1985) with Shorty Rogers
- Serious Swingers (Contemporary, 1987) with Bill Perkins
