= More Gravy (Willis Jackson album) =

Studio album by Willis Jackson
- Released: 1964
- Recorded: October 24, 1963
- Studio: Van Gelder Studio, Englewood Cliffs, New Jersey
- Genre: Jazz
- Label: Prestige; PRLP 7317
- Producer: Ozzie Cadena

Willis Jackson chronology
The Good Life (1963)	More Gravy (1964)	Boss Shoutin' (1964)

More Gravy is an album by saxophonist Willis Jackson which was recorded in 1963 and released on the Prestige label.

== Reception ==
Professional ratings
Review scores
Source	Rating
Allmusic	4/5 stars
The Rolling Stone Jazz Record Guide	3/5 stars

Allmusic awarded the album 4 stars stating "More Gravy is among the many Jackson albums that is well worth hearing".

== Track listing ==
All compositions by Willis Jackson except where noted.

1. "Pool Shark" – 3:59
2. "Somewhere Along the Way" (Kurt Adams, Sammy Gallop) – 4:19
3. "Stuffin'" – 7:13
4. "Nuther'n Like Thuther'n" (Joe Hadrick, Willis Jackson) – 7:37
5. "More Gravy" – 4:09
6. "Fiddlin'" – 5:13

== Personnel ==
- Willis Jackson – tenor saxophone
- Frank Robinson – trumpet
- Carl Wilson – organ
- Pat Martino – guitar
- Sam Jones – bass
- Joe Hadrick – drums
