= Catalyst (band) =

American funk/jazz band

- Origin: Philadelphia, Pennsylvania, United States
- Genres: Funk, jazz fusion
- Years active: c. 1970–1976
- Labels: Muse, Cobblestone

Catalyst was an American funk/jazz quartet from Philadelphia, Pennsylvania, whose material presaged the work of later jazz fusion artists. The group encountered regional success in the 1970s and have become more widely known since the re-release of their material on CD.

== History ==
The group was discovered by producer Skip Drinkwater, who signed them to Muse Records after hearing them play at a club in West Philadelphia. Drinkwater and Dennis Wilen produced their debut self-titled LP, released in 1972 with the following personnel: Eddie Green (keyboards, vocals), Sherman Ferguson (percussion), Odean Pope (saxophone, flute, oboe), Alphonso Johnson (bass). The group received little label support for major tours and so spent most of their playing time in the Philadelphia and New York areas. The group recorded and released a second album in 1973 on Muse Records, entitled Perception; by this time, bassist Johnson had left the group to join Weather Report, and was replaced by Tyrone Brown. Drinkwater and Wilen also produced this album.

Garnering comparisons to John Coltrane, Weather Report, and Return to Forever, a cult following had grown up around the band by this time, who returned in 1974 with Unity, again on Muse. The album featured Billy Hart in addition to its core members. 1975's A Tear and a Smile would be the group's final release; poor album sales and disenchantment with the industry led the group to disband in 1976.

Following their time with Catalyst, Green, Brown and Ferguson played with Pat Martino on the 1974 album Consciousness, Brown and Ferguson also played on the album Pat Martino/Live! recorded in 1972 on which the guitarist's epic version of "Sunny" appears. And MFSB, and both Pope and Brown began playing gigs with Max Roach; Pope also played with the Saxophone Choir. Ferguson later played with Pharoah Sanders, Bud Shank, and Kenny Burrell.

In the 1990s, the Muse catalog was acquired by Joel Dorn's 32 Jazz label, which released some of Catalyst's work on a 1998 compilation album. Fan interest led to their entire four-album discography being released as a 2-CD set, entitled The Funkiest Band You Never Heard.

"Ain't it the Truth" and "Ile Ife" were covered by Uri Caine (keyboards), Ahmir "Questlove" Thompson (Drums, from The Roots), and Christian McBride (bass), on their album The Philadelphia Experiment.

== Discography ==
- Catalyst (Cobblestone, 1972)
- Perception (Muse, 1973)
- Unity (Muse, 1974)
- A Tear and a Smile (Muse, 1975)
- The Funkiest Band You Never Heard (32, 1999)
