= Fire Dance =

1997 jazz studio album

Studio album by Pat Martino, Peter Block, Ustad Habib Khan, Ilya Rayzman, and Zakir Hussain
- Released: 1997
- Genre: Jazz
- Labels: Mythos Records; MRCD0007

Fire Dance is an album by jazz guitarist Pat Martino, flutist Peter Block, sitar player Ustad Habib Khan, violinist Ilya Rayzman and tabla player Zakir Hussain. It was released in 1997 by Mythos Records.

The project was conceived by Block and Khan, who contacted Martino after hearing his work on the albums Baiyina (The Clear Evidence) and The Maker. Martino recalled: "I've always enjoyed studying different kinds of music, and there are a number of areas that I've rarely had the opportunity to enjoy in public performance. A good example is the recording project 'Fire Dance'. Its topic was based upon Indian ragas. The last time I enjoyed something similar to it was recorded 30 years prior on one of my earlier albums; 'Baiyina'. In both cases neither of these were performed publicly."

== Reception ==
Professional ratings
Review scores
Source	Rating
AllMusic	2.5/5 stars

In a review for AllMusic, Robert Taylor wrote: "Martino is mostly relegated to a sideman/group member role, but he is given plenty of space. While Block, Khan, tabla player Zakir Hussain, and violinist Ilya Rayzman sound perfectly at home here, Martino doesn't always sound comfortable... the session as a whole is very rewarding... this recording proved that he was not content to stay within any sort of comfort zone."

Writing for Jazz Times, Josef Woodard called the album an "intriguing east-meeting-west project" that allows the musicians to "cross freely over cultural boundaries," and commented: "Martino... provides the greatest excitement here, partly because of the unorthodoxy of the electric guitar in this setting, and partly because he burns, pure and simple. He serves a clean-but-ferocious style that is inimitably his own, and yet which adapts itself to other modes of musical thinking."

== Track listing ==
"Zeeshan" composed by Habib Khan. "Sacred River" is based on a traditional folk melody. Remaining tracks composed by Habib Khan and Peter Block.

1. "Firedance" – 6:50
2. "Amrita" – 7:59
3. "Sacred River" – 5:57
4. "Garland For A Poet" – 4:58
5. "Summer Stars" – 7:39
6. "Avatar" – 8:25
7. "Forgiveness" – 5:50
8. "Zeeshan" – 8:05
9. "A Season In Solitude" – 7:50
10. "Song For Yogam" – 6:11

== Personnel ==
- Pat Martino – guitar
- Peter Block – alto flute, bass flute
- Ustad Habib Khan – sitar
- Ilya Rayzman – violin
- Zakir Hussain – tabla, percussion
