= Alone Together (Pat Martino album) =

Studio album by Pat Martino
- Released: 2012
- Recorded: 1977–1978
- Genre: Jazz
- Label: HighNote Records; HCD 7242

Pat Martino chronology
Undeniable: Live at Blues Alley (2011)	Alone Together (2012)	Young Guns (2014)

Alone Together is an album by jazz guitarist Pat Martino, on which he is joined by fellow guitarist Bobby Rose. It was recorded during 1977 and 1978 and was released in 2012 by HighNote Records. Rose, who—like Martino—had roots in Philadelphia, had also appeared on Martino's Baiyina (The Clear Evidence) (1968) and The Visit (1972).

== Reception ==
Writing for Jazz Times, Aidan Levy stated: "these intimate low-fidelity documents, some capturing private duo sessions in Martino's Philadelphia apartment, offer a rare, unvarnished glimpse into the creative process of two guitarists at the peak of their powers... It features some of Martino's last recordings before 1979, when a near-fatal brain aneurysm left him with amnesia, sidelining his recording career until 1987."

In an article for The Philadelphia Inquirer, David Patrick Stearns commented: "Martino... reaches some unbelievable heights on this spare duet session. With Rose's energetic comping, Martino seems dialed in to create cosmic climaxes. His lines sear the soul, even on tunes that just reek of the period, such as 'Sunny,' which Martino had previously recorded. Both men were absorbed in the I-Ching and the Quran at the time, and the playing shows both a simplicity and a force that is pretty mesmerizing. Martino's 'Israfel' is just a straight sprint to the top of the mountain."

== Track listing ==
1. "Four On Six" (Wes Montgomery) – 5:30
2. "Alone Together" (Arthur Schwartz) – 7:55
3. "What Are You Doing the Rest of Your Life?" (Michel Legrand) – 3:15
4. "Sunny" (Bobby Hebb) – 6:49
5. "Left... Or Right" (Pat Martino) – 7:31
6. "The Visit" (Pat Martino) – 6:14
7. "One for My Baby" (Harold Arlen/Johnny Mercer) – 9:58
8. "Israfel" (Pat Martino) – 8:20

== Personnel ==
- Pat Martino – guitar
- Bobby Rose – guitar
