= Remember: A Tribute to Wes Montgomery =

Studio album by Pat Martino
- Released: 2006
- Recorded: August 9 & 10, 2005
- Studios: Avatar (New York, New York)
- Genre: Jazz
- Labels: Blue Note; 0946 3 11226 2 0

Pat Martino chronology
Think Tank (2003)	Remember: A Tribute to Wes Montgomery (2006)	Undeniable: Live at Blues Alley (2011)

Remember: A Tribute to Wes Montgomery is an album by jazz guitarist Pat Martino. It was recorded on August 9 & 10, 2005 in New York City, and was released by Blue Note Records in 2006. In addition to Martino, the album features David Kikoski on piano, John Patitucci on bass, Scott Allan Robinson on drums, and Daniel Sadownick on percussion.

== Background ==
When Martino was 14, his father took him to see Montgomery at a local club, and Martino got to meet him in person. Martino, who had memorized Montgomery's solos as a youth, reflected: "What I found most interesting about Wes were his emotional interpretations. The magic of curiosity and its result. Like Wes, I was primarily self taught, mostly from melodies I heard, and not scales." Martino would initially pay tribute to Montgomery on his 1972 album The Visit!, subtitled "Inspired by and dedicated to Wes Montgomery."

== Reception ==
Professional ratings
Review scores
Source	Rating
AllMusic	3.5/5 stars
The Penguin Guide to Jazz	4/4 stars
The Guardian	3/5 stars
All About Jazz	3.5/5 stars

In a review for AllMusic, Ronnie D. Lankford, Jr. wrote: "Remember: A Tribute to Wes Montgomery... isn't so much an album that seeks to mimic the style of another guitarist, but a loving tribute that reflects without copying Montgomery's style... For Martino and Montgomery fans, and for anyone who loves good guitar music, Remember is a well-conceived and executed album." The authors of the Penguin Guide to Jazz Recordings called the album "an amazing turnaround," and commented: "Instead of another tiresome, rote homage to a deceased star, Martino has put up one of his greatest records." They concluded that Martino "has simply never sounded better."

Writing for The Guardian, John Fordham stated: "Martino... is good enough in his own right to attempt a replication and make something out of it that does both him and Montgomery credit... Straightahead swing, but at its classiest." John Kelman, in an article for All About Jazz, wrote: "The playing is never less than stellar... Martino's understanding of Montgomery's style runs deep, but this is no mere imitative homage. Martino pays the greatest tribute possible by managing to get right inside Montgomery's appealing style... without losing sight of the advanced chromatic approach that has defined Martino's style since nearly the beginning... Musically speaking, Remember is highly recommended — it's one of Martino's strongest efforts since his 1987 comeback, in fact, a modern master paying respect to a past legend and acknowledging an unequivocal debt." John Heidt, in an article for Vintage Guitar, commented: "The songs here are instantly recognizable, but still, Martino makes them his own... This is one that Pat – and Wes – can be proud of."

== Track listing ==
1. "Four On Six" (Wes Montgomery) - 6:00
2. "Groove Yard" (Carl Perkins) - 5:51
3. "Full House" (Montgomery) - 7:01
4. "Heartstrings" (Milt Jackson) - 6:50
5. "Twisted Blues" (Montgomery) - 5:13
6. "Road Song" (Montgomery) - 7:07
7. "West Coast Blues" (Montgomery) - 7:17
8. "S.K.J." (Milt Jackson) - 7:10
9. "If I Should Lose You" (Ralph Rainger, Leo Robin) - 7:41
10. "Unit 7" (Sam Jones) - 5:41

Recorded on August 9 & 10, 2005 at Avatar Studios, New York

== Personnel ==
- Pat Martino – guitar
- David Kikoski - piano
- John Patitucci - bass
- Scott Allan Robinson - drums
- Daniel Sadownick - percussion
