= Gatorade (album) =

Album by Willis Jackson

Studio album by Willis Jackson
- Released: 1982
- Recorded: August 1971
- Studio: Van Gelder Studio, Englewood Cliffs, New Jersey
- Genre: Jazz
- Length: 37m
- Label: Prestige/Fantasy; MMP-2516
- Producer: Bob Porter

Willis Jackson chronology
Recording Session (1970)	Gatorade (1982)	West Africa (1973)

Gatorade is an album by saxophonist Willis Jackson which was recorded in August 1971 and first released on the Prestige label.

== Track listing ==
1. "Good Bread Alley" (Willis Jackson) – 7:30
2. "Hey Jude" (Lennon/McCartney) – 4:27
3. "Ivy" (Meeks/Jackson) – 5:56
4. "Pow!" (Willis Jackson) – 6:09
5. "Long And Winding Road" (Lennon/McCartney) – 5:08
6. "Gatorade" (Willis Jackson) – 7:48

== Personnel ==
- Willis Jackson – tenor sax
- Carl Wilson – organ
- Boogaloo Joe Jones – guitar
- Jerry Porter – drums
- Buddy Caldwell – conga
