= Ungawa =

Ungawa may refer to:

- "Ungawa", a song by Neil Innes from his 1982 album Off the Record
- "Ungawa", a song by the blues-rock trio Chow Nasty
- "Ungawa", a song recorded by Dizzy Gillespie on his 1959 album The Ebullient Mr. Gillespie
- "Ungawa", a song by Willis Jackson from his 1977 album The Gator Horn

== See also ==
- "Ungawa the Gorilla God", an episode of the animated series George of the Jungle
