= Muse Records =

Defunct jazz record company

- Parent company: Savoy Jazz
- Founded: 1972
- Founder: Joe Fields
- Defunct: 1997
- Status: Inactive
- Genre: Jazz
- Country of origin: U.S.
- Location: New York City

Muse Records was a jazz record company and label founded in New York City by Joe Fields in 1972.

Fields worked as an executive for Prestige Records in the 1960s. Several of the albums were previously released on Cobblestone Records. Muse also had another label, Onyx Records, which operated until 1978, when Fields and collaborator Don Schlitten ended their professional relationship.

In the late 1970s, Muse partnered with the Dutch Timeless Records to distribute Timeless Muse.

Muse was sold in 1996 to 32 Jazz, which repackaged and reissued a large amount of Muse recordings. In 2003, Savoy Jazz (which had become a subsidiary of Nippon Columbia) acquired the rights to the Muse catalog (along with that of Landmark) from 32 Jazz.

Fields later founded HighNote Records and Savant Records; many Muse artists later recorded for these labels as well.

== Discography ==
From 1972 until 1995 Muse released around 500 albums.

Cat	Artist	Album	Year
5001	James Moody	Never Again!	1972
5002	Richard Davis	Epistrophy & Now's the Time	1972
5003	Roy Brooks	The Free Slave	1970
5004	Jimmy Raney	Strings & Swings	1957, 1969
5005	Don Patterson	The Return of Don Patterson	1972
5006	Sonny Stitt	12!	1972
5007	Jaki Byard	There'll Be Some Changes Made	1972
5008	Muddy Waters Blues Band	Mud in Your Ear	1967
5009	Mark Murphy	Bridging a Gap	1972
5010	Cedar Walton	A Night At Boomers, Vol. 1	1973
5011	Chick Corea	Bliss! [re-release of Douglas SD 782]	1967
5012	Tiny Grimes	Profoundly Blue	1973
5013	Dom Um Romao	Dom Um Romao	1973
5014	Grant Green	Green Blues [re-release of Jazztime JT 003]	1961
5015	Cecil Payne and Duke Jordan	Brooklyn Brothers	1973
5016	Al Cohn and Zoot Sims	Body and Soul	1973
5017	Joao Donato	Donato Deodato	1973
5018	Kenny Barron	Sunset to Dawn	1973
5019	Eric Kloss	One, Two, Free	1972
5020	James Moody	Feelin' It Together	1973
5021	Muddy Waters Blues Band	Chicken Shack	1974
5022	Cedar Walton	A Night At Boomers, Vol. 2	1973
5023	Sonny Stitt	The Champ	1973
5024	The Visitors	In My Youth	1972
5025	Catalyst	Perception	1972
5026	Pat Martino	Pat Martino/Live!	1972
5027	Richard Davis	Dealin'	1972
5028	Jimmy Heath	Love and Understanding	1973
5029	Neal Creque	The Hands of Time	1973
5030	Bobby Pierce	New York	1973
5031	Albert Heath	Kwanza (The First)	1973
5032	Don Patterson	These Are Soulful Days	1973
5033	Bu Pleasant	Ms. Bu	1973
5034	Red Rodney	Bird Lives!	1973
5035	Joe Chambers	The Almoravid	1971, 1973
5036	Willis Jackson	West Africa	1973
5037	Phil Woods	Musique du Bois	1974
5038	Eric Kloss	Essence	1973
5039	Pat Martino	Consciousness	1974
5040	Carlos Garnett	Black Love	1974
5041	Mark Murphy	Mark II	1973
5042	Catalyst	Unity	1974
5043	Eddie Jefferson	Things Are Getting Better	1974
5044	Kenny Barron	Peruvian Blue	1974
5045	Teddy Edwards	Feelin's	1974
5046	Red Rodney	Superbop	1974
5047	The Visitors	Rebirth	1974
5048	Willis Jackson	Headed and Gutted	1974
5049	Dom Um Romao	Spirit of the Times	1973
5052	Louis Hayes	Breath of Life	1974
5053	Kenny Dorham	Ease It! [re-release of Jazztime JT 001]	1961
5054	Harold Vick	Commitment	1967
5055	Lester Bowie	Fast Last!	1974
5056	Kenny Clarke and Francy Boland	Open Door	1967
5057	Carlos Garnett	Journey to Enlightenment	1974
5058	Woody Shaw	The Moontrane	1974
5059	Cedar Walton	Firm Roots	1974
5060	Walter Bishop Jr.	Valley Land	1974
5061	Cecil Payne	Bird Gets the Worm	1976
5062	Robin Kenyatta	Nomusa	1975
5063	Eddie Jefferson	Still on the Planet	1976
5064	Linc Chamberland	A Place Within	1976
5065	Joe Bonner	The Lifesaver	1974
5066	Walter Bishop Jr.	Speak Low [=Jazztime JT 002]	1961
5067	Sonny Stitt	Mellow	1975
5068	Sonny Criss	Crisscraft	1975
5069	Catalyst	A Tear and a Smile	1975
5070	Kenny Barron	Lucifer	1975
5071	Creative Construction Company	Creative Construction Company	1970
5072	Stan Bronstein	Our Island Music	1976
5073	David Matthews	Big Band Live at the Five Spot	1975
5074	Woody Shaw	Love Dance	1975
5075	Pat Martino	Exit	1976
5076	Clifford Jordan	Night of the Mark VII	1975
5077	Eric Kloss	Bodies' Warmth	1975
5078	Mark Murphy	Mark Murphy Sings	1975
5079	Carlos Garnett	Let This Melody Ring On	1975
5080	Buster Williams	Pinnacle	1975
5081	Lester Bowie	Rope-A-Dope	1975
5082	Richie Cole and Eric Kloss	Battle of the Saxes	1976
5083	Richard Davis	With Understanding [=Cobblestone CST 9003]	1971
5084	Rickie Boger	Slow Down Baby	1975
5085	Dom Salvador	My Family	1976
5086	Hermeto Pascoal	Hermeto [=Cobblestone CST 9000]	1972
5087	Elmore James / Eddie Taylor	Street Talkin' [=Cobblesone CST 9001]	1964
5088	Red Rodney	The Red Tornado	1975
5089	Sonny Criss	Out of Nowhere	1975
5090	Pat Martino	We'll Be Together Again	1976
5091	Sonny Stitt	My Buddy: Sonny Stitt Plays for Gene Ammons	1975
5092	Dave Pike	Time Out of Mind	1975
5093	Richard Davis and Jill McManus	As One	1975
5094	The Visitors	Motherland	1975
5095	Robin Kenyatta	Beggars and Stealers	1969, 1975
5096	Pat Martino	Footprints [=Cobblestone CST 9015]	1972
5097	Creative Construction Company	Creative Construction Company Vol. II	1970
5098	Dave Matthews' Big Band	Night Flight	1976
5099	Etta Jones	Ms. Jones to You	1976
5100	Willis Jackson	In the Alley	1976
5101	Buster Williams	Crystal Reflections	1976
5102	Mark Murphy	Stolen Moments	1978
5103	Woody Shaw	Little Red's Fantasy	1976
5104	Carlos Garnett	Cosmos Nucleus	1976
5105	Clifford Jordan	Remembering Me-Me	1976
5106	Steve Kuhn	Raindrops: Live in New York [=Cobblestone CST 9020]	1972
5107	Harold Ousley	The People's Groove	1972, 1976
5108	David Schnitter	Invitation	1976
5109	David Friesen	Color Pool	1975
5110	Houston Person	Stolen Sweets	1976
5111	Red Rodney	Red, White and Blues	1976
5112	Eric Kloss and Barry Miles	Together	1976
5113	Stan Bronstein	Living on the Avenue	1976
5114	Joe Bonner	Angel Eyes	1974, 1976
5115	Richard Davis	Harvest	1977
5116	Eddie "Cleanhead" Vinson	The "Clean" Machine	1978
5117	Woody Shaw	In The Beginning [unissued, released as 5298]	1965
5118	Sonny Phillips	My Black Flower	1976
5119	Richie Cole	New York Afternoon	1976
5120	Grant Green	Iron City [=Cobblestone CST 9002]	1967
5121	Don Patterson	Movin' Up!	1977
5122	Emanuel K. Rahim	Total Submission [=Cobblestone CST 9014?]	1972
5123	Hank Jones	Bop Redux	1977
5124	Barry Altschul	You Can't Name Your Own Tune	1977
5125	Louis Hayes	The Real Thing	1977
5126	Charles Earland	Smokin' [3 tracks reissued from Choice CMG-520]	1969, 1977
5127	Eddie Jefferson	The Live-liest	1976
5128	Clifford Jordan	Inward Fire	1977
5129	Sonny Stitt	Blues for Duke	1975
5130	Red Garland	Feelin' Red	1978
5131	Brownie McGhee and Sonny Terry	You Hear Me Talkin'	1958-1961
5132	Cedar Walton / Hank Mobley Quintet	Breakthrough! [=Cobblestone CST 9011]	1972
5133	Carlos Garnett	The New Love	1977
5134	Groove Holmes	Shippin' Out	1977
5135	Red Rodney	Home Free	1977
5136	Houston Person	The Big Horn	1976
5138	Jimmy Heath	Jimmy [=Cobblestone CST 9012]	1972
5139	Woody Shaw	The Woody Shaw Concert Ensemble at the Berliner Jazztage	1976
5140	Kenny Barron and Ted Dunbar	In Tandem	1975
5141	Harold Ousley	Sweet Double Hipness	1972
5142	Walter Bishop Jr.	Soul Village	1977
5143	Jonothan Schwartz	Jonathan Schwartz Sings Arthur Schwartz: Alone Together	1977
5144	Kenny Burrell	Handcrafted	1978
5145	Etta Jones	My Mother's Eyes	1977
5146	Willis Jackson	The Gator Horn	1977
5147	Eric Kloss	Now	1978
5148	Don Patterson	Why Not...	1978
5149	Sam Jones	Something in Common	1977
5150	Vic Juris	Roadsong	1977
5151	Walter Bishop Jr.	Cubicle	1978
5152	Bill Hardman	Home	1978
5153	David Schnitter	Goliath	1977
5154	Eddie Daniels	Brief Encounter	1977
5155	Richie Cole	Alto Madness	1977
5156	Charles Earland	Mama Roots [some reissued from Choice label]	1969, 1977
5157	Sonny Phillips	I Concentrate On You	1977
5158	Johnny Lytle	Everything Must Change	1977
5159	Junior Cook	Good Cookin'	1979
5160	Woody Shaw	The Iron Men	1977
5161	Houston Person	Wild Flower	1977
5162	Willis Jackson	Bar Wars	1977
5163	Clifford Jordan	The Adventurer	1978
5164	Gene Ludwig	Now's the Time	1979
5165	Joe Chambers with Larry Young	Double Exposure	1978
5166	Morgana King	Stretchin' Out	1977
5167	Groove Holmes	Good Vibrations	1977
5168	Dave Pike	On a Gentle Note	1977
5169	Hank Jones	Groovin' High	1978
5170	Catalyst	Catalyst [=Cobblestone CST 9018?]	1972
5171	Buster Williams	Heartbeat	1978
5172	Walt Barr	First Visit	1978
5173	Jaki Byard	Family Man	1978
5174	Mickey Tucker	Mister Mysterious	1978
5175	Etta Jones	If You Could See Me Now	1978
5176	Barry Altschul	Another Time/Another Place	1978
5177	Brownie McGhee and Sonny Terry	Hootin'	1958-1961
5178	Houston Person	The Nearness of You	1977
5179	Willis Jackson and Pat Martino	Single Action	1978
5180	Richard Davis	Way Out West	1977
5181	Charles Earland	Infant Eyes	1978
5182	Pepper Adams	Reflectory	1978
5183	Walter Bishop Jr.	Hot House	1977, 1978
5184	Bill Hardman	Politely	1981
5185	Johnny Lytle	Fast Hands	1980
5186	Ron Escheté	To Let You Know I Care	1978
5188	Ricky Ford	Manhattan Plaza	1978
5190	Morgana King	Everything Must Change	1978
5191	Arnett Cobb	Live at Sandy's!	1978
5192	Richie Cole	Keeper of the Flame	1978
5193	Charlie Shoemake	Sunstroke	1978
5194	Mack Goldsbury	Anthropo-Logic	1978
5195	The Visitors	Neptune [=Cobblestone CST 9010?]	1971
5196	Eric Kloss	Celebration	1979
5197	David Schnitter	Thundering	1978
5198	Buddy Tate	Live at Sandy's	1978
5199	Houston Person	Suspicions	1980
5200	Willis Jackson and Von Freeman	Lockin' Horns	1978
5201	Charles Earland	Pleasant Afternoon	1978
5202	Eddie "Lockjaw" Davis	The Heavy Hitter	1979
5203	Dave Pike	Let the Minstrels Play On	1978
5204	Sonny Stitt	Sonny's Back	1980
5205	John Lee Hooker	Sittin' Here Thinkin'	1961
5206	Vic Juris	Horizon Drive	1979
5207	Richie Cole	Hollywood Madness	1979
5208	Eddie "Cleanhead" Vinson	Live at Sandy's	1978
5209	Red Rodney	Live at the Village Vanguard	1980
5210	Walt Barr	East Winds	1979
5211	Steve Giordano	Daybreak	1979
5212	Various Artists	Cryin' in the Morning	
5213	Pepper Adams	The Master...	1980
5214	Etta Jones	Save Your Love for Me	1980
5215	Mark Murphy	Satisfaction Guaranteed	1979
5216	Kenny Burrell	Kenny Burrell Live at the Village Vanguard	1978
5217	Helen Humes	Helen Humes and the Muse All Stars	1979
5218	Junior Cook	Somethin's Cookin'	1981
5219	Memphis Slim	I'll Just Keep On Singin' The Blues	
5220	Kenny Barron	Golden Lotus	1980
5221	Charlie Shoemake	Blue Shoe	1979
5222	David Schnitter	Glowing	1979
5223	Mickey Tucker	The Crawl	1979
5224	Morgana King	Higher Ground	1979
5226	Neal Creque	Black Velvet Rose [=Cobblestone CST 9005]	1972
5227	Ricky Ford	Flying Colors	1980
5228	Sonny Stitt	In Style	1981
5229	Gil Goldstein	Wrapped in Your Cloud	1980
5230	Tony Scott	Golden Moments	1959
5231	Houston Person	Very PERSONal	1980
5232	Charles "Bobo" Shaw and Human Arts Ensemble	P'NKJ'ZZ	1981
5233	Helen Humes	Helen	1980
5234	David Newman	Resurgence!	1980
5235	Bill Barron	Jazz Caper	1978
5236	Arnett Cobb	More...Live at Sandy's!	1978
5237	Phil Woods and Richie Cole	Side By Side	1980
5238	Walt Barr	Artful Dancer	1980
5239	Groove Holmes	Broadway	1980
5240	Charles Earland	In the Pocket	1982
5241	Kenny Burrell	Kenny Burrell in New York	1978
5242	Ira Sullivan	Ira Sullivan Does It All	1981
5243	Eddie "Cleanhead" Vinson	Hold It Right There!	1978
5244	Cedar Walton and Abbey Lincoln	The Maestro	1980
5245	Richie Cole	Cool C	1981
5246	Ron Escheté	Line Up	1980
5247	Lou Donaldson	Sweet Poppa Lou	1981
5248	Melvin Sparks	Sparkling	1981
5249	Buddy Tate	Hard Blowin'	1978
5250	Ricky Ford	Tenor for the Times	1981
5251	Bruce Forman	River Journey	1981
5252	Art Hodes	Someone to Watch Over Me	1981
5253	Mark Murphy	Bop for Kerouac	1981
5255	David Friesen	Storyteller	1981
5256	Albert Dailey	Textures	1981
5257	Morgana King	Looking Through the Eyes of Love	1981
5258	Jon Hendricks	Love	1981, 1982
5259	Bill Hardman	Focus	1980
5260	Houston Person	Heavy Juice	1982
5261	Dave Pike	Moon Bird	1981
5262	Etta Jones	Love Me With All Your Heart	1983
5263	Linc Chamberland	Yet To Come	1981
5264	Kenny Burrell	Listen to the Dawn	1980
5265	Vic Juris	Bleecker Street	1981
5266	Tony Scott	I'll Remember	1959
5267	Red Rodney	Hi Jinx at the Vanguard	1980
5268	Charles "Bobo" Shaw	Bugle Boy Bop	1977
5269	Sonny Stitt	The Last Stitt Sessions Vol. 1	1982
5270	Richie Cole	Alive!	1981
5271	Johnny Lytle	Good Vibes	1981
5272	Harold Land	Xocia's Dance	1981
5273	Bruce Forman	20/20	1981
5274	Red Rodney and Ira Sullivan	Night and Day	1981
5275	Ricky Ford	Interpretations	1982
5276	Mitch Farber	Starclimber	1982
5279	Art Hodes and Milt Hinton	Just the Two of Us	1981
5280	Sonny Stitt	The Last Stitt Sessions Vol. 2	1982
5281	Kenny Burrell	Groovin' High	1981
5282	Eddie "Cleanhead" Vinson	Eddie "Cleanhead" Vinson & Roomful of Blues	1982
5283	David Newman	Still Hard Times	1982
5286	Mark Murphy	The Artistry of Mark Murphy	1982
5287	Stephane Grappelli and Hank Jones	Stephane Grapelli and Hank Jones [=String 33852]	1979
5288	Jimmy Witherspoon	Jimmy Witherspoon Sings the Blues	
5289	Houston Person	Always on My Mind	1985
5290	Red Rodney	The 3R's	1979
5291	Eric Kloss	Doors [=Cobblestone CST 9006]	
5292	Lou Donaldson	Back Street	1982
5293	Big Joe Turner	Blues Train	1983
5294	Willis Jackson	Nothing Butt...	1980
5295	Richie Cole	Some Things Speak for Themselves [=Seven Seas K28P-6067]	1981
5296	Ricky Ford	Future's Gold	1983
5297	Mark Murphy	Brazil Song	1983
5298	Woody Shaw	In the Beginning	1965
5299	Bruce Forman	In Transit	1982
5301	Morgana King	Portraits	1983
5302	Esther Phillips	A Way to Say Goodbye	1984
5303	Larry Coryell	Comin' Home	1984
5304	Bobby Pierce	Piercing [=Cobblestone CST 9016]	1972
5305	Mal Waldron and David Friesen	Encounters	1984
5306	Bill Barron	Variations in Blue	1984
5307	Red Rodney and Ira Sullivan	Alive in New York	1980
5308	Mark Murphy	Mark Murphy Sings the Nat King Cole Songbook	1983
5309	Bud Shank	This Bud's for You...	1984
5310	Eddie "Cleanhead" Vinson	Eddie "Cleanhead" Vinson Sings the Blues	1978, 1982
5311	Red Garland	I Left My Heart...	1978
5312	Earle Warren	Earle Warren and the Count's Men	1985
5313	Pepper Adams and Frank Foster	Generations	1985
5314	Ricky Ford	Shorter Ideas	1984
5315	Bruce Forman	The Bash	1982
5316	Willis Jackson	Ya Understand Me? [=Black & Blue 33810]	1980
5317	Kenny Burrell	A la Carte	1983
5318	Woody Shaw	Setting Standards	1983
5319	Larry Coryell	Equipoise	1985
5320	Mark Murphy	Murphy, Mark Sings the Nat King Cole Songbook Vol. 2	1983
5322	Ricky Ford	Looking Ahead	
5323	Sonny Stitt	Constellation [=Cobblestone CST 9021]	1972
5324	Jimmy Ponder	Mean Streets – No Bridges	1987
5325	Jonothan Schwartz	Anyone Would Love You	1985
5326	Morgana King	Simply Eloquent	1986
5327	Jimmy Witherspoon	Midnight Lady Called the Blues	1986
5328	Pat Martino	The Return	
5329	Woody Shaw	Solid	1986
5330	Bobby Jones	The Legacy of Bobby Jones	
5331	Houston Person	The Talk of the Town	1987
5332	Members Only	Members Only	1987
5333	Etta Jones	Fine and Mellow	1986
5334	Sonny Stitt	Tune-Up! [=Cobblestone CST 9013]	1972
5335	Wallace Roney	Verses	1987
5336	Hendricks, Michele	Carryin' On	1987
5337	Bowie, Lester	Hello Dolly [=Muse 5055]	1974
5338	Woody Shaw	Imagination	1987
5339	Morgana King	Another Time, Another Space	1987
5340	Waters, Benny	From Paradise (Small's) to Shangri-La	1987
5341	Cindy Blackman	Arcane	1987
5344	Houston Person	Basics	1987
5345	Mark Murphy	Living Room	1984
5346	Wallace Roney	Intuition	1988
5347	Jimmy Ponder	Jump	1988
5348	Members Only	The Way You Make Me Feel	1988
5349	Ricky Ford	Saxotic Stomp	1987
5350	Larry Coryell	Toku Do	1987
5351	Etta Jones	I'll Be Seeing You	1987
5352	Michael Carvin	First Time	
5355	Mark Murphy	Beauty and the Beast	1985, 1986
5356	Al Cohn and Zoot Sims	Body and Soul [=Muse MR 5016]	1973
5358	Groove Holmes	Blues All Day Long	1988
5359	Mark Murphy	Kerouac, Then and Now	1986
5360	Larry Coryell	Shining Hour	1989
5361	Jack McDuff	The Reentry	1988
5362	Jack Walrath	Wholly Trinity	
5363	Michele Hendricks	Keepin' Me Satisfied	1988
5365	Cindy Blackman	Code Red	1990
5366	Sheila Jordan and Harvie Swartz	Old Time Feeling [~Palo Alto PA 8038-N]	1982
5367	Akio Sasajima with Joe Henderson	Akio Sasajima with Joe Henderson	
5368	Bill Barron	The Next Plateau	1987
5369	James Spaulding	Brilliant Corners	1988
5370	Michael Carvin	Between Me and You	1988
5371	Red Rodney	Bird Lives! [=Muse MR 5034]	1973
5372	Wallace Roney	The Standard Bearer	1989
5373	Ricky Ford	Hard Groovin'	1989
5374	Jack McDuff	Another Real Good 'Un	1989, 1990
5375	Jimmy Ponder	Come On Down	1990
5376	Houston Person and Ron Carter	Something in Common	1989
5377	Cecil Brooks III	The Collective	1989
5378	Jim McNeely	The Plot Thickens	
5379	Etta Jones	Sugar	1989
5380	Rod Williams	Hanging in the Balance	1989
5381	Gloria Lynne	A Time for Love	1989
5382	James Spaulding	Songs of Courage	1991
5383	Jay Hoggard	Overview	1989
5384	Buck Hill	Capital Hill	1989
5385	Donald Brown	Sources of Inspiration	1989
5386	Jerome Harris	In Passing	1989
5387	Johnny Lytle	Happy Ground	1989
5388	Shirley Scott	Oasis	1989
5389	Lonnie Plaxico	Plaxico	1989
5390	Sheila Jordan	Lost and Found	1989
5392	Glenna Powrie	Asha	1989
5394	Jimmy Ponder	To Reach a Dream	1988, 1989
5395	Groove Holmes	Hot Tat	1989
5398	Marty Ehrlich and Anthony Cox	Falling Man	1989
5399	Michael Carvin	Revelation	1989
5400	Mitch Farber	Starclimber [~Muse MR 5276]	1982, 1990
5401	Dakota Staton	Dakota Staton	1990
5402	Graham Haynes	What Time It Be!	1990
5403	Jack Walrath	Out of the Tradition	1990
5404	Michele Hendricks	Me and My Shadow	1990
5405	Cedar Walton	As Long as There's Music	1990
5406	Donald Brown	People Music	1990
5408	Morgana King	I Just Can't Stop Loving You	1990, 1991
5409	Charles Earland	Whip Appeal	1990
5410	Jay Hoggard	The Little Tiger	1990
5411	Etta Jones	Christmas with Etta Jones	1990
5412	Rod Williams	Destiny Express	1990
5413	James Spaulding	Gotstabe a Better Way!	1988
5414	Gloria Lynne	No Detour Ahead	1992
5416	Buck Hill	The Buck Stops Here	1990
5417	Akio Sasajima	Time Remembered	1989
5418	Buddy Tate, Nat Simpkins and Houston Person	Just Friends	1990
5419	Mark Murphy	What a Way to Go	1990
5420	Lorez Alexandria	May I Come In	1990
5421	Houston Person and Ron Carter	Now's the Time	1990
5422	Jack Walrath	Gut Feelings	1990
5423	Wallace Roney	Obsession	1990
5425	Sandy Graham	Sandy Graham	1989
5426	Larry O'Neill	You Got Me Runnin'	1990, 1991
5427	Lonnie Plaxico	Iridescence	1990
5428	Cecil Brooks III	Hangin' with Smooth	1990
5429	Sonny Stitt	The Champ [=Muse MR 5023]	1973
5430	Buster Williams	Crystal Reflections [~Muse MR 5101]	1976
5431	Johnny Lytle	Moonchild	1991
5432	Randy Johnston	Walk On	1991
5433	Houston Person	Why Not!	1990
5434	Shirley Scott	Great Scott!	1991
5435	Kenny Burrell and Rufus Reid	Ellington a la Carte	1983
5436	Mark Murphy	I'll Close My Eyes	1991
5437	Cindy Blackman	Telepathy	1992
5438	Lewis Keel	Coming Out Swinging	1990
5439	Big Maybelle	The Last of Big Maybelle	
5441	Wallace Roney	Seth Air	1991
5443	Don Patterson	The Genius of the B3 [=Muse MR 5005]	1972
5444	Hank Jones	Bop Redux [=Muse MR 5123]	1977
5445	Clifford Jordan	Highest Mountain [=Muse MR 5076]	
5446	Dave Pike	Times Out of Mind [=Muse MR 5092]	
5447	Donald Brown	Cause and Effect	1991
5448	Akio Sasajima and Ron Carter	Akioustically Sound	1991
5449	Buck Hill	I'm Beginning to See the Light	1991
5450	Jay Hoggard	The Fountain	1991
5451	Houston Person	The Party	1989
5454	Graham Haynes	Nocturne Parisian	1991, 1992
5455	Charles Earland	Unforgettable	1991
5456	Ron Jackson	A Guitar Thing	1991
5457	Lorez Alexandria	I'll Never Stop Loving You	1992
5458	Michael Logan	Night Out	1990
5462	Dakota Staton	Darling, Please Save Your Love for Me	1991
5463	Frenando Tarrés	On the Edges of White	1991
5466	Charles Brown	Blues and Other Love Songs	1992
5467	James Spaulding	Blues Nexus	1993
5468	Sheila Jordan	Heart Strings	1993
5469	Antoine Roney	The Traveler	1992
5470	Junior Cook	Somethin's Cookin' [~Muse MR 5218]	1981
5471	Gil Goldstein	The Sands of Time [=Muse MR 5229]	1980
5472	Woody Shaw	The Moontrane [=Muse MR 5058]	1974
5473	Helen Humes	Helen Humes and the Muse All-Stars [=Muse MR 5217]	
5474	Etta Jones	Reverse the Charges	1991, 1992
5475	Jack Walrath	Serious Hang	1992
5476	Jay Hoggard	In the Spirit	1992
5477	Lonnie Plaxico	Short Takes	
5478	Ricky Ford	Tenor Madness Too!	1992
5479	Donald Brown	Send One Your Love	1992
5480	Houston Person	The Lion and His Pride	1991
5481	Charles Earland	I Ain't Jivin' I'm Jammin'	1992
5482	Johnny Lytle	Possum Grease	1992
5483	Buck Hill	Impulse	1992
5484	Ernie Andrews	No Regrets	1992
5485	Michael Carvin	Each One Teach One	
5488	Lorez Alexandria	Star Eyes	
5489	Sheila Jordan and Mark Murphy	One for Junior	1991
5492	Tex Allen	Late Night	1991
5493	Morgana King	This Is Always	1992
5494	Chris White	The Chris White Project	1992
5495	Randy Johnston	Jubilation	1992
5496	Della Griffin	Travelin' Light	1992
5497	Radam Schwartz	Organ-ized	1992
5499	Charles Earland	Ready 'n Able	1995
5501	John DeFrancesco	Doodlin'	1992
5502	Dakota Staton	Isn't This a Lovely Day	1992
5503	Freddy Cole	This Is the Life	1993
5504	Cecil Brooks III	Neck Peckin' Jammie	1993
5505	Philip Harper	Soulful Sin	1993
5507	Lafayette Harris	Lafayette Is Here	1992
5509	Jimmy Forrest	Heart of the Forrest [=Palo Alto PAJ 8021]	1978
5510	Nat Simpkins	Cookin' with Some Barbeque	1994
5511	Etta Jones	At Last	1993, 1995
5512	Randy Johnston	In A-Chord	1994
5514	Jimmy Ponder	Soul Eyes	1991
5515	Ron Jackson	Thinking of You	1993
5516	Fernando Tarrés	Secret Rhythms	1993
5518	Wallace Roney	Crunchin'	1993
5520	Philip Harper	The Thirteenth Moon	1994
5521	Cecil Brooks III	Smokin' Jazz	
5522	Donald Brown	Car Tunes	1993
5523	Hannibal Marvin Peterson	One with the Wind	1993
5524	Warren Vaché	Horn of Plenty	1993
5525	Lonnie Plaxico	With All Your Heart	1993
5527	Jay Hoggard	Love Is the Answer	1994
5528	Joey DeFrancesco	All About My Girl	1994
5529	Pat Martino	Interchange	1994
5530	Houston Person	Christmas with Houston Person and Friends	1994
5531	John DeFrancesco	Comin' Home	1994
5533	Wallace Roney	Munchin'	1993
5534	Etta Jones with Benny Green	My Gentleman Friend	1994
5539	Russell Gunn	Young Gunn	1994
5540	Teddy Edwards and Houston Person	Horn to Horn	1994
5541	Lafayette Harris and Melba Moore	Happy Together	
5542	Cindy Blackman	The Oracle	1995
5543	Ernie Andrews	The Great City	1995
5544	Carlos Garnett	Resurgence	
5546	Antoine Roney	Whirling	
5547	Warren Vaché	Talk to Me Baby	
5552	Pat Martino	Nightwings	
5556	Jay Hoggard	A Night in Greenwich Village	
5558	Arnett Cobb	Live at Sandy's! [=Muse MR 5191 + MR 5236]	1978
5566	Don Patterson and John Simon	Legacy	
5567	Jimmy Ponder	Something to Ponder	1994
5568	Della Griffin	I'll Get By	

== See also ==
- List of record labels
