= The Good Life (Willis Jackson album) =

Studio album by Willis Jackson
- Released: 1963
- Recorded: May 23–24, 1963
- Studio: Van Gelder Studio, Englewood Cliffs, New Jersey
- Genre: Jazz
- Label: Prestige; PRLP 7285
- Producer: Ozzie Cadena

Willis Jackson chronology
Grease 'n' Gravy (1963)	The Good Life (1963)	More Gravy (1963)

The Good Life is an album by saxophonist Willis Jackson which was recorded in 1963 and released on the Prestige label.

== Reception ==
Professional ratings
Review scores
Source	Rating
Allmusic	2.5/5 stars

Allmusic awarded the album 2½ stars stating "IIt's pleasing, if unsurprising, early-'60s organ soul-jazz with a good balance between brass, organ, and guitar, perhaps more useful as club groove music than home listening".

== Track listing ==
1. "The Good Life" (Sacha Distel, Jack Reardon) – 5:06
2. "Days of Wine and Roses" (Henry Mancini, Johnny Mercer) – 4:05
3. "As Long as She Needs Me" (Lionel Bart) – 3:44
4. "Fly Me to the Moon" (Bart Howard) – 2:57
5. "Angel Eyes" (Earl Brent, Matt Dennis) – 4:16
6. "Troubled Times" (Willis Jackson, Wade Marcus, William "Mickey" Stevenson) – 4:54
7. "Walk Right In" (Gus Cannon, Hosea Woods) – 6:05
- Recorded at Van Gelder Studio in Englewood Cliffs, New Jersey on May 23 (tracks 1–5), & May 24 (tracks 6 & 7), 1963

== Personnel ==
- Willis Jackson – tenor saxophone
- Frank Robinson – trumpet
- Carl Wilson – organ
- Pat Martino – guitar
- Leonard Gaskin – bass (tracks 6 & 7)
- Joe Hadrick – drums
