= Boss Shoutin' =

Studio album by Willis Jackson
- Released: 1964
- Recorded: January 9, 1964
- Studio: Van Gelder Studio, Englewood Cliffs, New Jersey
- Genre: Jazz
- Label: Prestige; PR 7329
- Producer: Ozzie Cadena

Willis Jackson chronology
More Gravy (1963)	Boss Shoutin' (1964)	Jackson's Action! (1964)

Boss Shoutin' is an album by saxophonist Willis Jackson which was recorded in 1964 and released on the Prestige label.

== Reception ==
Professional ratings
Review scores
Source	Rating
Allmusic	4/5 stars

Allmusic awarded the album 4 stars stating "Boss Shoutin' is well worth obtaining if you prefer your jazz on the funky side".

== Track listing ==
All compositions by Willis Jackson except where noted.

1. "St. Louis Blues" (W. C. Handy) – 8:24
2. "Que Sera, Sweetie" – 7:01
3. "Shoutin'" – 6:45
4. "Nice 'n' Easy" (Alan and Marilyn Bergman, Lew Spence) – 6:38
5. "Your Wonderful Love" (Dorothy Fields, Richard Rodgers) – 5:57

== Personnel ==
- Willis Jackson – tenor saxophone
- Frank Robinson – trumpet
- Carl Wilson – organ
- Pat Martino – guitar
- George Tucker – bass
- Joe Hadrick – drums
