= Nothing Butt... =

Studio album by Willis Jackson
- Released: 1983
- Recorded: June 20, 1980
- Studio: Van Gelder Studio, Englewood Cliffs, New Jersey
- Genre: Jazz
- Length: 33:21
- Label: Muse; MR 5294
- Producer: Bob Porter

Willis Jackson chronology
Lockin' Horns (1978)	Nothing Butt... (1983)	Ya Understand Me? (1980)

Nothing Butt... is an album by saxophonist Willis Jackson which was recorded in 1980 and first released on the Muse label in 1983.

== Reception ==
Professional ratings
Review scores
Source	Rating
Allmusic	3/5 stars

In his review on Allmusic, Scott Yanow states "Tenor saxophonist Willis Jackson got into a routine on his Muse albums, but never lost his enthusiasm and creativity within the genre ... An excellent effort full of enjoyable and fairly accessible music".

== Track listing ==
All compositions by Willis Jackson except where noted.

1. "Just the Way You Are" (Billy Joel) – 7:06
2. "Nuages" (Django Reinhardt) – 4:49
3. "Nothing Butt" – 4:48
4. "Hittin' and Missin'" – 8:00
5. "Autumn Leaves" (Joseph Kosma, Jacques Prévert, Johnny Mercer) – 4:27
6. "Move" (Denzil Best) – 4:01

== Personnel ==
- Willis Jackson – tenor saxophone
- Charles Earland – organ
- Pat Martino – guitar
- Grady Tate – drums
