= The Return (Pat Martino album) =

Live album by Pat Martino
- Released: 1987
- Recorded: February 1987
- Venue: Fat Tuesday's, New York City
- Genre: Jazz
- Length: 43:56
- Label: Muse; MR 5328
- Producer: Pat Martino

Pat Martino chronology
Exit (1977)	The Return (1987)	Interchange (1994)

The Return is a live album by guitarist Pat Martino which was recorded in 1987 and first released on the Muse label.

== Reception ==
Professional ratings
Review scores
Source	Rating
AllMusic	3/5 stars

AllMusic awarded the album 3 stars stating "Pat Martino suffered a brain aneurysm in 1980, and after successful surgery, he was left with musical amnesia. He had to completely relearn how to play guitar, and the process of recovery took a long time... Martino performs lengthy versions of four new originals during a live set from Fat Tuesdays, showing no mercy either for his sidemen or toward himself... the guitarist's musical courage is admirable, and the music (which can only be classified as "modern jazz") is frequently exciting".

In an article for NPR, Shaun Brady stated that the album "showcased a miraculous virtuosity seemingly undiminished by [Martino's] brush with death and amnesia." Ryan Goldsmith of The Science Survey commented that The Return showed "an undiminished greatness... kicking off the second chapter of his career."

== Track listing ==
All compositions by Pat Martino

1. "Do You Have a Name?" - 12:33
2. "Slipback" - 8:50
3. "All That You Have" - 11:09
4. "Turnpike" - 11:24

== Personnel ==
- Pat Martino - guitar
- Steve LaSpina - bass
- Joey Baron - drums
