= Strings! =

Studio album by Pat Martino
- Released: 1967
- Recorded: October 2, 1967
- Studios: Van Gelder Studio, Englewood Cliffs, New Jersey
- Genre: Jazz
- Length: 37:21
- Labels: Prestige; PR 7547
- Producer: Don Schlitten

Pat Martino chronology
El Hombre (1967)	Strings! (1967)	East! (1968)

Strings! is the second album by guitarist Pat Martino recorded in 1967 and released on the Prestige label.

== Reception ==
Professional ratings
Review scores
Source	Rating
AllMusic	4/5 stars
The Penguin Guide to Jazz Recordings	3/4 stars

AllMusic awarded the album 4 stars stating "Guitarist Pat Martino's second recording as a leader finds him essentially playing advanced bop. His quintet really roars on an uptempo version of "Minority" and is diverse enough to come up with meaningful statements on four of Martino's originals".

The authors of the Penguin Guide to Jazz Recordings commented that Strings! is "noteworthy for a long, burning treatment of Gigi Gryce's 'Minority', where Farrell's thunderous tenor solo is matched by equally flying statements by Martino and Walton."

== Track listing ==
All compositions by Pat Martino except as indicated

1. "Strings" - 5:52
2. "Minority" (Gigi Gryce) - 9:20
3. "Lean Years" - 8:37
4. "Mom" - 7:23
5. "Querido" - 6:07

== Personnel ==
- Pat Martino - guitar
- Joe Farrell - tenor saxophone, flute
- Cedar Walton - piano
- Ben Tucker - bass
- Walter Perkins - drums
- Ray Appleton, Dave Levin - percussion (track 1)

=== Production ===
- Don Schlitten - producer
- Rudy Van Gelder - engineer
