= Star Bag =

Studio album by Willis Jackson
- Released: 1968
- Recorded: March 22, 1968
- Studio: Van Gelder Studio, Englewood Cliffs, New Jersey
- Genre: Jazz
- Label: Prestige; PR 7571
- Producer: Cal Lampley

Willis Jackson chronology
Soul Grabber (1967)	Star Bag (1968)	Swivelhips (1968)

Professional ratings
Review scores
Source	Rating
Allmusic	3/5 stars

Star Bag is an album by saxophonist Willis Jackson which was recorded in 1968 and released on the Prestige label.

== Track listing ==
All compositions by Willis Jackson except where noted.

1. "Star Bag" – 7:35
2. "The Girl from Ipanema" (Antônio Carlos Jobim, Vinícius de Moraes, Norman Gimbel) – 5:55
3. "Good to the Damn Bone" (Jackson, Bill Jennings) – 5:38
4. "More" (Riz Ortolani, Nino Oliviero, Norman Newell) – 7:25
5. "Smoke Rings" (Gene Gifford, Ned Washington) – 6:00
6. "Yellow Days" (Alan Bernstein, Álvaro Carrillo) – 5:45

== Personnel ==
- Willis Jackson – tenor saxophone
- Trudy Pitts – organ
- Bill Jennings – guitar
- Jimmy Lewis – electric bass
- Bobby Donaldson – drums
- Victor Allende – congas
