= Stone Blue (Pat Martino album) =

Studio album by Pat Martino & Joyous Lake
- Released: 1998
- Recorded: February 14–22, 1998
- Genre: Jazz
- Length: 59:54
- Label: Blue Note; BN 8530822
- Producer: Michael Cuscuna

Pat Martino chronology
All Sides Now (1997)	Stone Blue (1998)	Live at Yoshi's (2001)

Stone Blue is an album by the guitarist Pat Martino, recorded in 1998 and released on the Blue Note label.

== Reception ==
Professional ratings
Review scores
Source	Rating
AllMusic	4/5 stars
The Penguin Guide to Jazz Recordings	3/4 stars

AllMusic stated: "The guitar master is at it again on this collection of original tunes. Mixing up bop and funk with heavy doses of pop, he offers up a very listenable album with lots of character". Jim Santella from All About Jazz noted: "Guitarist Pat Martino exhibits his long-standing appreciation for the urban lifestyle of New York City and Philadelphia on his latest album Stone Blue. That cocky feeling of self-assurance one develops from living and working in the city gives rise to strutted rhythms, deliberate tempos, and melodies that range from sixteenth-note-laden confetti clusters to dreamy skyborne shouts". The All About Jazz critic Josef Woodard commented: "What sounds timeless here is the leader, wailing with a kind of concurrent wisdom and go-for-broke commitment to improvisational abandon. The truth is that Martino stands up every time he plays. Hints of Martino's unique power is contained in each episode of his work, this latest chapter included".

== Track listing ==
All compositions by Pat Martino

1. "Uptown Down" – 4:25
2. "Stone Blue" – 6:46
3. "With All the People" – 9:15
4. "13 to Go" – 7:27
5. "Boundaries" – 8:09
6. "Never Say Goodbye" – 3:40
7. "Mac Tough" – 6:13
8. "Joyous Lake" – 13:26
9. "Two Weighs Out" – 0:33

== Personnel ==
- Pat Martino – guitar
- Eric Alexander – tenor saxophone
- Delmar Brown – keyboards
- James Genus – bass
- Kenwood Dennard – drums, percussion
