= Undeniable: Live at Blues Alley =

Live album by Pat Martino
- Released: 2011
- Recorded: June 26–28, 2009
- Venue: Blues Alley, Washington, D.C.
- Genre: Jazz
- Length: 59:02
- Label: HighNote; HCD 7231
- Producer: Barney Fields

Pat Martino chronology
Remember: A Tribute to Wes Montgomery (2006)	Undeniable: Live at Blues Alley (2011)	Alone Together – with Bobby Rose (2012)

Undeniable: Live at Blues Alley is a live recording made at Blues Alley in Washington, D.C. in June 2009 by Pat Martino and his band. It was released on the HighNote label.

== Reception ==
Professional ratings
Review scores
Source	Rating
AllMusic	4/5 stars

AllMusic reviewed the album stating "Undeniable: Live at Blues Alley is a memorable document of Martino's June 2009 appearance at the Washington, D.C. club." JazzTimes observed "Recorded live with a brilliant all-star group, this is one of his best recordings for years." Downbeat noted "The shuffle march that drives 'Midnight Special' does its job by hustling everything along, but Monaco's stormy exposition and Martino's fluid romp play havoc with the groove while steadfastly fanning its flames."

The album was the vision of executive producer Darryl J. Brodzinski, who to date has produced 4 Pat Martino albums. Originally the recording was to be at Birdland in New York but got changed to Blues Alley. After its release, the album reached #1 on the Jazz Record Charts and a Jazzwise Five-Star Review.

== Track listing ==
All compositions by Pat Martino except as indicated

1. "Lean Years" - 7:37
2. "Inside Out" - 8:32
3. "Goin' to a Meeting" - 10:00
4. "Double Play" - 8:03
5. "Midnight Special" - 8:45
6. "'Round Midnight" (Thelonious Monk) - 7:52
7. "Side Effect" - 8:10

== Personnel ==
- Pat Martino - guitar
- Eric Alexander - tenor saxophone
- Tony Monaco - Hammond organ
- Jeff "Tain" Watts - drums
- Darryl J. Brodzinski- executive producer
- Barney Fields - producer
- Jay Franco - engineer
