= El Hombre =

Studio album by Pat Martino
- Released: 1967
- Recorded: May 1, 1967
- Studio: Van Gelder Studio, Englewood Cliffs, New Jersey
- Genre: Jazz
- Length: 41:12
- Label: Prestige
- Producer: Cal Lampley

Pat Martino chronology
El Hombre (1967)	Strings! (1967)

El Hombre is the debut album by jazz guitarist Pat Martino. It was recorded in 1967 and released by Prestige Records

== Reception ==
Professional ratings
Review scores
Source	Rating
Allmusic	4.5/5 stars
The Penguin Guide to Jazz Recordings	2.5/4 stars

Allmusic gave the album 4½ stars, stating, "Guitarist Pat Martino's debut as a leader finds the 22-year-old showing off his roots in soul-jazz organ groups while looking ahead at the same time...Martino primarily plays a straight-ahead set but already displays a fairly distinctive sound".

The authors of the Penguin Guide to Jazz Recordings stated that, although El Hombre "depend[s] on blues-base formulas" and is "typical of the genre... Martino's maturing style... is good enough to transcend the settings."

Writing for PopMatters, Will Layman commented: "El Hombre is an organ-drenched speedfest that shows off this Philly kid's ability to play soulfully, spinning out seemingly endless solos shot through with blue notes, flatted fifths, and thirty-second runs. It was Martino's calling card, and this was his party. And it is, appropriately, a good time... El Hombre deserves to be heard by new fans as well as old ones. Many a young guitarist today will be stunned and jealous, I'm sure, of how fresh this... music still sounds."

In an article for All About Jazz, Ian Patterson wrote: "There are any number of truly great Martino solos throughout this swinging straight-ahead session... An auspicious debut that announced the arrival of a great talent and a distinctive voice."

== Track listing ==
All tracks are written by Pat Martino except where noted.

No.	Title	Length
1.	"Waltz for Geri"	6:21
2.	"Once I Loved" (Ray Gilbert/Antônio Carlos Jobim/Vinicius de Moraes)	5:42
3.	"El Hombre"	5:57
4.	"Cisco"	4:29
5.	"One for Rose"	4:54
6.	"A Blues for Mickey-O"	8:02
7.	"Just Friends" (John Klenner/Sam M. Lewis)	5:47

== Personnel ==
- Pat Martino – guitar
- Danny Turner – flute
- Trudy Pitts – Hammond organ
- Mitch Fine – drums
- Vance Anderson – bongos
- Abdu Johnson – congas

Production

- Cal Lampley – producer
- Rudy Van Gelder – engineer
