= People Music (Donald Brown album) =

Studio album by Donald Brown
- Released: 1991
- Recorded: March 19 and 21, 1990
- Studio: New York City
- Genre: Jazz
- Length: 53:05
- Label: Muse; MCD 5406
- Producer: Don Sickler

Donald Brown chronology
Sources of Inspiration (1989)	People Music (1991)	Cause and Effect (1991)

People Music is an album by pianist Donald Brown which was recorded in 1990 and released on the Muse label.

== Reception ==
Professional ratings
Review scores
Source	Rating
AllMusic	3/5 stars

The AllMusic review by Scott Yanow stated "Fine '90 date by a Memphis pianist. He plays nice bluesy chords and gospel-influenced phrases, but is also an effective straight-ahead and hard bop improviser. He's backed by a large group that features an interesting configuration with a trumpet/alto sax/vibes front line, and also uses vocals at times".

== Track listing ==
All compositions by Donald Brown except where noted

1. "Biscuit Man" – 3:47
2. "Gaslight" (Duke Pearson) – 6:23
3. "Prism" – 5:03
4. "Reruns from the Sixties" – 9:02
5. "Over at Herbie's Juke Joint" – 5:43
6. "I Love It When You Dance That Way" (Donald Brown, Dorothy Brown) – 5:45
7. "Graylon" – 6:57
8. "Booker T." – 5:43
9. "Intensive Care Unit (I.C.U.)" (James Williams) – 4:42

== Personnel ==
- Donald Brown – piano
- Tom Harrell – trumpet, flugelhorn
- Vincent Herring – flute, soprano saxophone, alto saxophone
- Steve Nelson – vibraphone
- Robert Hurst – bass
- Samurai Celestial – drums, vocals
- Daniel G. Sadownick– percussion
- Lenora Zenzalai Helm – vocals (track 6)
