= Nightwings (Pat Martino album) =

Studio album by Pat Martino
- Released: 1996
- Recorded: May 27, 1994
- Genre: Jazz
- Length: 56:31
- Label: Muse; MR 5552
- Producer: Paul Bagin

Pat Martino chronology
The Maker (1995)	Nightwings (1996)	All Sides Now (1997)

Nightwings is an album by the guitarist Pat Martino, recorded in 1994 and released on the Muse label in 1996.

== Reception ==
Professional ratings
Review scores
Source	Rating
AllMusic	3/5 stars

AllMusic awarded the album 3 stars, stating: "Martino favors a more-is-more approach here, a welcome change for fans of his earlier recordings. His chops are on full display".

Writing for All About Jazz, Douglas Payne called Nightwings "Martino's least convincing album ever," and commented: "Even the guitarist feels lazy and apathetic as he scales some of the most mundane changes he's ever charted. Certainly this disc has its share of admirers. I'm not convinced; mostly because Martino does little here that's persuasive... listen to Nightwings simply to hear how a master sounds on an off day."

== Track listing ==
All compositions by Pat Martino

1. "Draw Me Down" - 11:54
2. "Portrait" - 8:04
3. "Villa Hermosa" - 15:59
4. "I Sing the Blues Every Night" - 7:32
5. "A Love Within" - 6:28
6. "Nightwings" - 6:34

== Personnel ==
- Pat Martino - guitar
- Bob Kenmotsu - tenor saxophone
- James Ridl - piano
- Marc Johnson - bass
- Bill Stewart - drums
