= In the Alley =

Studio album by Willis Jackson
- Released: 1977
- Recorded: 1976
- Studio: Dimensional Sounds Studio, New York City
- Genre: Jazz
- Label: Muse; MR 5100
- Producer: Fred Seibert

Willis Jackson chronology
| Plays with Feeling (1976) | In the Alley (1977) | The Gator Horn (1977) |

In the Alley is an album by saxophonist Willis Jackson which was recorded in 1976 and first released on the Muse label.

== Reception ==
Professional ratings
Review scores
| Source | Rating |
|---|---|
| Allmusic | 3/5 stars |
| The Rolling Stone Jazz Record Guide | 3/5 stars |

In his review on Allmusic, Scott Yanow calls the album a "typical but often exciting outing" and states "The music includes blues, romps, a ballad, and funky vamps".

== Track listing ==
All compositions by Willis Jackson except where noted.

1. "Niamani" (Sonny Phillips) – 7:25
2. "Gator's Groove" (Yusef Ali) – 7:07
3. "Blues Blues Blues" – 5:09
4. "Young Man With a Horn" (Ray Anthony) – 5:58
5. "More" (Nino Oliviero, Riz Ortolani, Marcello Ciorciolini, Norman Newell) – 7:45
6. "In the Alley" – 9:14

== Personnel ==
- Willis Jackson – tenor saxophone
- Sonny Phillips – piano
- Carl Wilson – organ
- Jimmy Ponder – guitar
- Jimmy Lewis – bass
- Yusef Ali – drums
- Buddy Caldwell – congas, percussion
