= Desperado (Pat Martino album) =

Studio album by Pat Martino
- Released: March 1970
- Recorded: March 9, 1970
- Genre: Jazz
- Length: 35:53
- Label: Prestige
- Producer: Bob Porter

Pat Martino chronology
Baiyina (The Clear Evidence) (1968)	Desperado (1970)	The Visit! (1972)

Professional ratings
Review scores
Source	Rating
Allmusic	4/5 stars
The Penguin Guide to Jazz Recordings	3/4 stars

Desperado is a 1970 post-bop jazz album by American jazz musician Pat Martino.

“A key album in the shift in Pat Martino's sound at the end of the 60s -- with one foot in the soul jazz camp in which he got his start, and the other in the freer, open-minded style he used a lot in the 70s!”

== Reception ==
Jazz critic Scott Yanow described the album as “funky in spots, electric, and swinging when called for” and extols Martino's performance as “consistently inventive"

The authors of the Penguin Guide to Jazz Recordings wrote: "Desperado is a little-known stab at fusion: Martino plays electric 12-string against rumbling electric piano and bass, and the results are akin to a tighter, less violent Lifetime. 'Express' and 'Desperado' hit a particularly compelling movement."

In an article for All About Jazz, Ian Patterson wrote: "Martino's inventiveness... seems inexhaustible... Though Martino's soloing has the energy of rock, the language is unmistakably jazz, with a clear melodic logic. There is also a gentler side to his playing, as witnessed on the caressing ballad 'A Portrait of Diana.' 'Express' caps an excellent album on a thrilling note."

“Even this difficult instrument doesn’t dampen his proficiency.”

== Background ==
Recorded at the legendary Rudy Van Gelder studios, Martino chose a 12-string guitar to define his interpretations of his own compositions and "Oleo" by Sonny Rollins.

== Track listing ==
1. "Blackjack" (Martino) – 7:45
2. "Dearborn Walk" (Martino)– 3:50
3. "Oleo" (Sonny Rollins) – 4:53
4. "Desperado" (Martino, Green) – 7:55
5. "A Portrait of Diana" (Martino) – 4:30
6. ”Express” (Martino) – 6:43

=== CD Reissue ===
Remastered versions of the album (one being from 1989) do not include any bonus tracks and are stereo versions of the original stereo recording.

== Personnel ==
- Pat Martino – 12-string electric guitar
- Eric Kloss – soprano sax (track 1)
- Eddie Green – electric piano
- Tyrone Brown – electric bass
- Sherman Ferguson – drums, bells
- Les Paul – notes
- Rudy Van Gelder – recording
- Bob Porter – supervision
