= Gator's Groove =

Studio album by Willis Jackson
- Released: 1969
- Recorded: November 11, 1968
- Studio: Van Gelder Studio, Englewood Cliffs, New Jersey
- Genre: Jazz
- Label: Prestige; PR 7648
- Producer: Bob Porter

Willis Jackson chronology
Swivelhips (1968)	Gator's Groove (1969)	Mellow Blues (1970)

Gator's Groove is an album by saxophonist Willis Jackson which was recorded in 1968 and released on the Prestige label. Jackson first recorded the title tune for Atlantic Records in 1952; this is the version that circulates most today.

== Reception ==
Professional ratings
Review scores
Source	Rating
Allmusic	3/5 stars
The Rolling Stone Jazz Record Guide	3/5 stars

Allmusic awarded the album 3 stars.

== Track listing ==
All compositions by Willis Jackson except where noted.

1. "Brother Ray" (Ray Barretto) – 4:10
2. "A Day in the Life of a Fool" (Carl Sigman, Luiz Bonfá) – 6:35
3. "This is the Way I Feel" – 9:50
4. "Blue Jays" (Bill Jennings, Jackie Ivory, Willis Jackson) – 7:13
5. "Stolen Sweets" (Wild Bill Davis, Dickie Thompson) – 5:35
6. "Long Tall Dexter" (Dexter Gordon) – 7:07

== Personnel ==
- Willis Jackson – tenor saxophone, gator horn
- Jackie Ivory – organ
- Bill Jennings – guitar
- Ben Tucker – bass, electric bass
- Jerry Potter – drums
- Richard Landrum – congas
