= Interchange (album) =

Studio album by Pat Martino
- Released: 1994
- Recorded: 1994
- Genre: Jazz
- Length: 43:56
- Label: Muse; MR 5529
- Producer: Paul Bagin

Pat Martino chronology
The Return (1987)	Interchange (1994)	The Maker (1995)

Interchange is an album by guitarist Pat Martino which was recorded in 1994 and first released on the Muse label.

== Reception ==
Professional ratings
Review scores
Source	Rating
AllMusic	3/5 stars

AllMusic awarded the album 3 stars stating "The set here is a mixture of ballads and a few mid-tempo hard bop/post-bop numbers. While the temperature is not nearly as hot as his earlier work, the overall results prove to be more seasoned and mature sounding than anything he has ever recorded before. This recording was the first of many during the '90s, thanks to an entirely new generation discovering the genius of Pat Martino".

Writing for All About Jazz, Douglas Payne commented: "one could argue that Interchange is a neglected post-bop classic. Martino's ability to craft perfect, toe-tapping melodies rivals only Freddie Hubbard's. Like Hubbard, Martino's compositions serve as excellent launch pads for beautiful, creative playing... Martino has never played better or with more verve, wit and energy than he does here. He no longer displays the need to prove his stupendous skill. Talent of this magnitude doesn't need to... Interchange is his best showcase as an effective musician, leader and jazz composer. Altogether, a most beautiful session well worth investigating."

== Track listing ==
All compositions by Pat Martino except as indicated

1. "Catch" - 7:02
2. "Black Glass" - 6:51
3. "Interchange" (Jeff Beal, Pat Martino) - 10:32
4. "Just for Then" - 7:40
5. "Blue in Green" (Miles Davis, Bill Evans) - 8:53
6. "Recollection" - 9:51

== Personnel ==
- Pat Martino - guitar
- James Ridl - piano
- Marc Johnson - bass
- Sherman Ferguson - drums
