= Live at Yoshi's (Pat Martino album) =

Live album by Pat Martino
- Released: 2001
- Recorded: 2001
- Venue: Yoshi's, Oakland, California
- Genre: Jazz
- Length: 1:16:39
- Label: Blue Note

Pat Martino chronology
Stone Blue (1998)	Live at Yoshi's (2001)	Think Tank (2003)

Live at Yoshi's is an album recorded by jazz guitarist Pat Martino in 2001. It was nominated for the 2002 Grammy Award for Best Jazz Instrumental Album.

== Reception ==
Professional ratings
Review scores
Source	Rating
The Penguin Guide to Jazz Recordings	3.5/4 stars
AllMusic	4.5/5 stars

In a review for AllMusic, Paula Edelstein wrote: "the hard bop and funky soul-jazz of this trio are sure to please enthusiasts of the guitar, organ, and drum trio... From the sound of the audience on Live at Yoshi's, the guitar sage's head-spinning dexterity and cool tones... are more spirited than ever, and after listening to this CD, you'll be inclined to agree."

The authors of the Penguin Guide to Jazz Recordings stated: "the trio is nicely balanced, between DeFrancesco's natural exuberance and Hart's sage rhythm master. But the guitar's the thing."

Chip Stern, writing for Jazz Times, commented: "this is a raw, engaging live performance that shines the spotlight on Martino the guitar player and showcases his renewed authority as a soloist in the company of two masters of the form."

In an article for All About Jazz, Jim Santella remarked: "Pat Martino's trio session smokes from start to finish... Guitarist, organist and drummer romp through straight-ahead classics deliberately, setting aside plenty of time for stretching out... It sure is great to hear that survivor Pat Martino has it all together."

Vintage Guitar's John Heidt wrote: "It's just an out-and-out blowing session... Guess what? It's a winner from cut one all the way through!... One of the greats performing here with a brilliant band and playing great."

Maurice Bottomley, writing for PopMatters, stated: "the upbeat numbers swing like an axe and the slower tunes have that smoky, late-night atmosphere that remind you why you got into jazz in the first place."

== Track listing ==
All compositions by Pat Martino except as indicated

1. "Oleo" (Sonny Rollins) (7:02)
2. "All Blues" (Miles Davis) (12:05)
3. "Mac Tough" (10:05)
4. "Welcome to a Prayer" (10:33)
5. "El Hombre" (10:32)
6. "Recollection" (8:00)
7. "Blue in Green" (Bill Evans, Miles Davis) (7:21)
8. "Catch" (11:06)

== Personnel ==
- Pat Martino - guitar
- Joey DeFrancesco - organ
- Billy Hart - drums
