= Collard Greens & Gravy =

Australian blues band

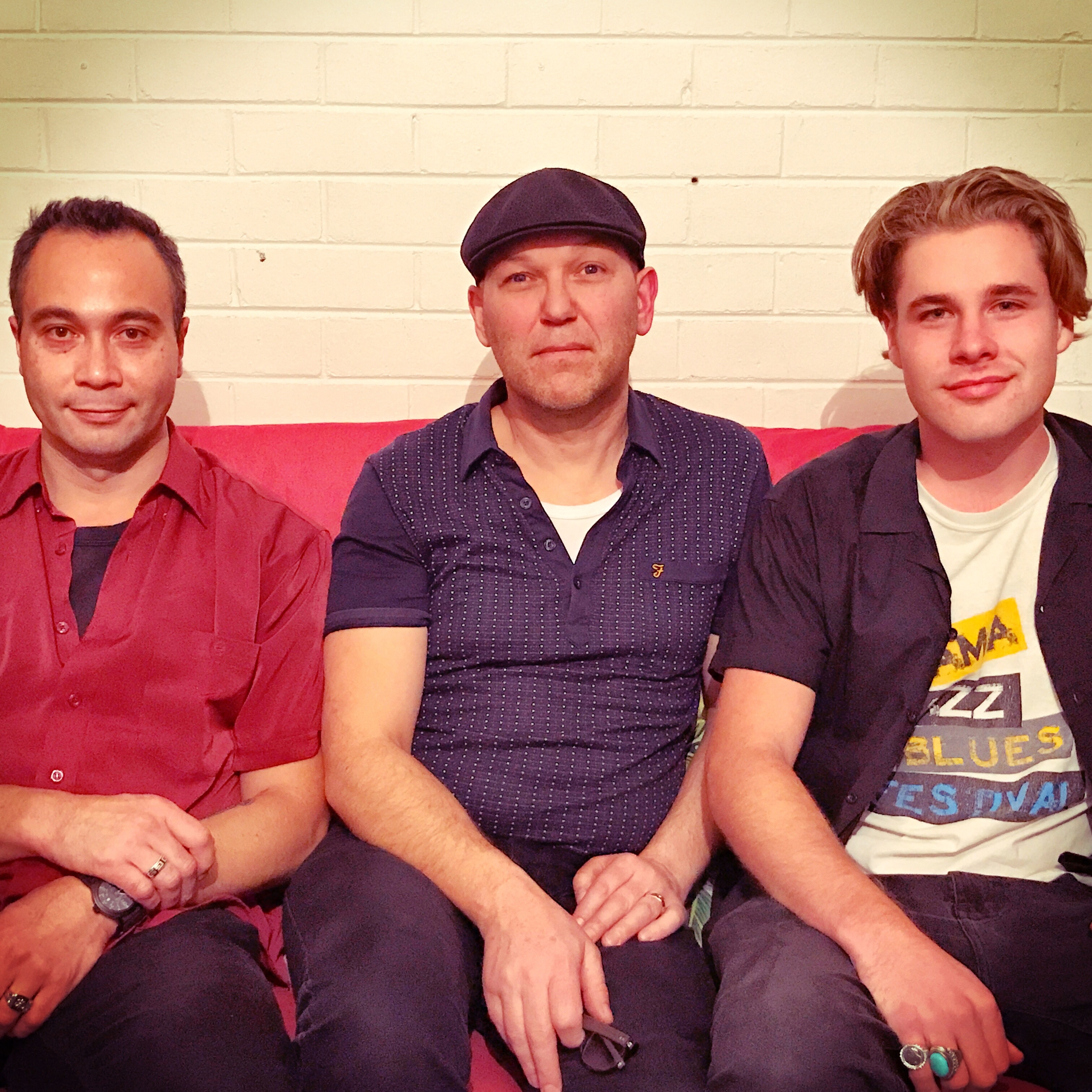
- L to R: Jason Liu Soon, Ian Collard, Sean Emmett; June 2017

Background information
- Origin: Melbourne, Victoria, Australia
- Genre: Blues
- Years active: 1995–2016; 2017–present
- Label: Black Market Music
- Members: Ian Collard; Jason Liu Soon; Sean Emmett
- Past members: James Bridges; Anthony Shortte
- Website: collardgreensandgravy.com

Collard Greens & Gravy are an Australian blues band which formed as a trio in 1995 by James Bridges on guitar and fiddle, Ian Collard on lead vocals, harmonica and guitar, and Anthony Shortte on drums. Their second studio album, More Gravy (2000), won Best Blues & Roots Album at the ARIA Music Awards of 2001. James Bridges died in September 2016 of pancreatic cancer, aged 57. Collard Greens & Gravy reformed in 2017 with Collard joined by Sean "Juke Boy" Emmett on guitar and Jason Liu Soon on drums.

== History ==
=== 1995-2003: Formation and early albums ===
Collard Greens & Gravy were formed in Melbourne in 1995 as a blues trio by James Bridges on guitar and fiddle, Ian Collard on lead vocals, harmonica and guitar, and Anthony Shortte on drums. The group's name refers to a fictitious meal, Collard explained, "When we went to America we discovered that... everywhere we went people would say, 'You can't put gravy on collard greens. Your name doesn't make any sense'."

Their debut self-titled album was released in 1999 via Black Market Music and was recorded live-in-the-studio at Soundhouse Studios. Benoît Felten of Planet Harmonica felt, "It is a very dark and haunting record, it has a kind of mean edge to it, not unlike some of the eeriest Robert Johnson stuff, although using different tools."

The group's second album, More Gravy was released in 2000, won Best Blues & Roots Album at the ARIA Music Awards of 2001. Australian musicologist, Ian McFarlane, described how the group's, "energetic foot-stomping, country blues sound tapped into the very roots of the genre." Patrick Donovan of The Age observed, "[their] local brand of swampy countrified electric blues has earned them a reputation as the best blues band in the land."

At the International Blues Challenge (IBC) competition in February 2001, Collard Greens & Gravy represented Australia in the International Blues Performer of the Year category and finished second. The group undertook tours of the United States.

=== 2004-present: Continued success ===
The group's third album, Silver Bird was released in June 2004. It was produced by John Durr. At the IBC competition in 2005, the album won Best Self-produced CD – tied with Robin Rogers' album, Crazy, Cryin' Blues.

The group's fourth album, Devil in the Woodpile, was released in November 2007. Sharon Kennedy of ABC South West WA, described their sound, "The music is Mississippi but from the hill country rather than the delta." Collard discussed Bridges' playing, "a really heavy, strong, deep sound... He puts a lot of thought into the guitar and amplifiers and the type of reverb."

At the Australian Blues Music Awards of 2009, they won Album of the Year for Devil in the Woodpile and Duo or Group of the Year for "No Love", while Ian Collard won Male Vocalist of the Year and John Durr won Producer of the Year. They were also nominated for Song of the Year for "No Love". McFarlane declared that this album and their follow up, Juke Joint Boogie! (September 2010), were, "considered to be their best releases." According to McFarlane, the group broke up in 2011.

Collard Greens & Gravy performed at the Byron Bay Bluesfest in April 2011 after being announced as part of the final lineup in March. They performed at the Deni Blues and Roots Festival in March 2013.

Collard Greens & Gravy, and Collard as a solo artist, performed at the Blues on Broadbeach Music Festival in May 2014. During that year they released a compilation album, Greasy Greens; while Ian Collard released a solo album, Swamp Stomp & Boogie. In February 2015 Collard Greens & Gravy appeared at the Goulburn Blues Festival. In the following December they celebrated their 20th anniversary with a performance at Spotted Mallard.

James Bridges died on 22 September 2016 of pancreatic cancer, he was aged 57. Shortte organised a GoFundMe campaign to raise money for the funeral. The new line-up had Collard joined by Soon on drums and Sean "Juke Boy" Emmett on guitar. They issued their sixth studio album, Luedella, in 2018, which won Best Blues Album at the Music Victoria Awards of 2018. By June 2019 Shortte was working with Kerri Simpson on guitar and lead vocals and Alison Ferrier on guitar in a blues group, Opelousas, which released their debut album, Opelousified, in that month. Collard was inducted into Blues Music Victoria's Hall of Fame as an Industry Icon, alongside Hugo T Armstrong, in November 2023 at Memo Music Hall, St. Kilda.. Collard Greens & Gravy then provided a "blistering" performance.

== Members ==
- James Bridges – guitar, fiddle, slide guitar (1995–2016, died 2016)
- Ian Collard – vocals, harmonica, guitar (1995–2016, 2017–current)
- Anthony Shortte – drums (1995–2016)
- Jason Liu Soon – drums (2017–2022)
- Liam – drums (2022–current)
- Sean Emmett – guitar (2017–2022)
- Benny Peter – guitar (2022–current)

== Discography ==
=== Studio albums ===
Title	Details
Collard Greens & Gravy	Released: 1999; Label: Black Market Music (BMM 227.2); Format: CD
More Gravy	Released: 2000; Label: Black Market Music (BMM 240.2); Format: CD
Silver Bird	Released: June 2004; Label: Black Market Music (BMM 284.2); Format: CD
Devil in the Woodpile	Released: November 2007; Label: Black Market Music (BMM 327.2); Format: CD, DD
Juke Joint Boogie!	Released: September 2010; Label: Black Market Music (BMM 357.2); Format: CD, DD
Luedella	Released: March 2018; Label: Only Blues Music (9331718001340); Format: CD, DD

=== Compilations ===
Title	Details
Greasy Greens	Released: 2014; Label: Collard Greens and Gravy; Format: CD, DD

== Awards and nominations ==
=== ARIA Music Awards ===
The ARIA Music Awards is an annual awards ceremony that recognises excellence, innovation, and achievement across all genres of Australian music. They commenced in 1987.

Year	Nominee / work	Award	Result	Ref.
2001	More Gravy	Best Blues and Roots Album	Won	

=== Music Victoria Awards ===
The Music Victoria Awards are an annual awards night celebrating Victorian music. They commenced in 2006.

Year	Nominee / work	Award	Result	Ref.
2018	Luedella	Best Blues Album	Won	
