= Swivelhips =

Studio album by Willis Jackson
- Released: 1969
- Recorded: September 9, 1968
- Studio: Van Gelder Studio, Englewood Cliffs, New Jersey
- Genre: Jazz
- Label: Prestige; PR 7602
- Producer: Bob Porter

Willis Jackson chronology
| Star Bag (1968) | Swivelhips (1969) | Gator's Groove (1968) |

Swivelhips is an album by saxophonist Willis Jackson which was recorded in 1968 and released on the Prestige label.

== Reception ==
Professional ratings
Review scores
| Source | Rating |
|---|---|
| Allmusic | 3/5 stars |

Allmusic awarded the album 3 stars.

== Track listing ==
All compositions by Willis Jackson except where noted.

1. "Swivel Hips" – 6:51
2. "In a Mellow Tone" (Duke Ellington, Milt Gabler) – 8:45
3. "Win, Lose or Draw" (Harold Ousley) – 3:54
4. "Y'Understand Me? – 8:05
5. "By the Time I Get to Phoenix" (Jimmy Webb) – 6:00
6. "Florence of Arabia" (Howard Roberts) – 7:10

== Personnel ==
- Willis Jackson – tenor saxophone, gator horn
- Jackie Ivory – organ
- Bill Jennings – guitar
- Ben Tucker – bass, electric bass
- Jerry Potter – drums
- Ralph Dorsey – congas
