= Single Action (album) =

Studio album by Willis Jackson with Pat Martino
- Released: 1978
- Recorded: April 28, 1978
- Studio: Van Gelder, Englewood Cliffs, New Jersey
- Genre: Jazz
- Label: Muse; MR 5179
- Producer: Willis Jackson

Willis Jackson chronology
Bar Wars (1978)	Single Action (1978)	Lockin' Horns (1978)

Single Action is an album by saxophonist Willis Jackson with guitarist Pat Martino, recorded in 1978 and released on the Muse label.

== Reception ==
Professional ratings
Review scores
Source	Rating
AllMusic	4/5 stars
The Rolling Stone Jazz Record Guide	3/5 stars

In his review on AllMusic, Scott Yanow notes that "Single Action does give one a good example of Jackson playing in a tenor style that (other than Houston Person and now Joshua Redman) is quickly disappearing."

== Track listing ==
All compositions by Willis Jackson except where noted.

1. "Evergreen" (Barbra Streisand, Paul Williams) – 4:44
2. "Bolita" – 8:12
3. "Makin' Whoopee" (Walter Donaldson, Gus Kahn) – 6:59
4. "You Are the Sunshine of My Life" (Stevie Wonder) – 7:43
5. "Hittin' the Numbers" – 5:01
6. "Single Action" – 6:17
7. "Evergreen" [alternate take] (Streisand, Williams) – 4:41 Bonus track on CD reissue

== Personnel ==
- Willis Jackson – tenor saxophone
- Pat Martino – guitar
- Carl Wilson – organ
- Jimmy Lewis – bass
- Yusef Ali – drums
- Buddy Caldwell – congas
