= Bar Wars =

Studio album by Willis Jackson
- Released: 1978
- Recorded: December 21, 1977
- Studio: Van Gelder Studio, Englewood Cliffs, New Jersey
- Genre: Jazz
- Length: 45:17
- Label: Muse; MR 5162
- Producer: Joe Fields

Willis Jackson chronology
The Gator Horn (1977)	Bar Wars (1978)	Single Action (1978)

Bar Wars is an album by saxophonist Willis Jackson, recorded in 1977 and released on the Muse label.

== Reception ==
Professional ratings
Review scores
Source	Rating
AllMusic	4.5/5 stars
The Rolling Stone Jazz Record Guide	3/5 stars

The Bay State Banner concluded: "Those who constantly cry about jazz's domination by the avant-garde should rush to hear Jackson. He blows rings around a horde of lesser talented but more highly publicized jazz-schlock tenors."

In his review for AllMusic, Scott Yanow stated: "This is a particularly exciting release... The chord changes might be fairly basic but Willis Jackson plays with such enthusiasm and exuberance that it almost sounds as if he had discovered the joy of playing music".

== Track listing ==
All compositions by Willis Jackson except where noted.

1. "Later" (Sil Austin, Tiny Bradshaw, Henry Glover) – 5:51
2. "Blue and Sentimental" (Count Basie, Mack David, Jerry Livingston) – 2:59
3. "Bar Wars" – 6:57
4. "The Breeze and I" (Tutti Camarata, Ernesto Lecuona, Al Stillman) – 5:00
5. "The Goose Is Loose" – 5:02
6. "It's All Right With Me" (Cole Porter) – 7:15
7. "The Breeze and I" [alternate take] (Camarata, Lecuona, Stillman) – 5:10 Bonus track on CD reissue
8. "It's All Right With Me" [alternate take] (Porter) – 7:03 Bonus track on CD reissue

== Personnel ==
- Willis Jackson – tenor saxophone
- Charles Earland – organ
- Pat Martino – guitar
- Idris Muhammad – drums
- Buddy Caldwell – congas, percussion
