= East! =

Studio album by Pat Martino
- Released: 1968
- Recorded: January 8, 1968; New York City
- Genre: Jazz
- Length: 38:06
- Label: Prestige; PR 7562
- Producer: Don Schlitten

Pat Martino chronology
Strings! (1967)	East! (1968)	Baiyina (The Clear Evidence) (1968)

East! is the third album by guitarist Pat Martino recorded in 1968 and released on the Prestige label.

== Reception ==
Professional ratings
Review scores
Source	Rating
Allmusic	4.5/5 stars
The Penguin Guide to Jazz Recordings	3/4 stars

AllMusic's Scott Yanow awarded the album 4½ stars stating "Despite the title and the cover of this CD reissue (which makes it appear that the performances are greatly influenced by music of the Far East), the style played by guitarist Pat Martino's quartet is very much in the hard bop tradition. Martino was already developing his own sound and is in excellent form... It's a good example of Pat Martino's playing in his early period".

The authors of the Penguin Guide to Jazz Recordings wrote: "East! offers some of Martino's clearest and most articulate soloing against a straightforward rhythm section."

Writing for Stereophile, Wes Phillips commented: "if you've never heard East!... hie thee to the music retailer of your choice and pick up this essential classic. It's great jazz played by a god among guitarists."

== Track listing ==
1. "East" (Tyrone Brown) - 12:47
2. "Trick" (Pat Martino) - 6:59
3. "Close Your Eyes" (Bernice Petkere) - 6:10
4. "Park Avenue Petite" (Benny Golson) - 5:50
5. "Lazy Bird" (John Coltrane) - 6:28

== Personnel ==
- Pat Martino - guitar
- Eddie Green - piano
- Ben Tucker - bass, tambourine
- Tyrone Brown - bass (track 1)
- Lenny McBrowne - drums

=== Production ===
- Don Schlitten - producer
- Richard Anderson - engineer
