= Headed and Gutted =

Live album by Willis Jackson
- Released: 1974
- Recorded: May 16, 1974
- Genre: Jazz
- Label: Muse; MR 5048

Willis Jackson chronology
West Africa (1974)	Headed and Gutted (1974)	The Way We Were (1975)

Headed and Gutted is a live album by saxophonist Willis Jackson which was recorded in 1974 and first released on the Muse label.

== Reception ==
Professional ratings
Review scores
Source	Rating
Allmusic	4/5 stars
The Rolling Stone Jazz Record Guide	3/5 stars

In his review on Allmusic, Scott Yanow states that "Willis "Gator" Jackson's series of albums for Muse during the 1970s helped keep alive the soulful, tough tenor tradition of Illinois Jacquet, Gene Ammons, and (later on) Houston Person. For this particular set, the participation of guitarist Pat Martino made the date more notable than it might have been."

== Track listing ==
All compositions by Willis Jackson except as indicated

1. "Headed and Gutted" - 5:19
2. "Blue Velvet" (Bernie Wayne, Lee Morris) - 8:18
3. "Miss Ann" - 6:27
4. "The Way We Were" (Alan Bergman, Marilyn Bergman, Marvin Hamlisch) - 6:51
5. "Gator Whale" - 6:06
6. "My One and Only Love" (Guy Wood, Robert Mellin) - 5:45

== Personnel ==
- Willis Jackson - tenor saxophone
- Pat Martino - guitar
- Mickey Tucker - organ, electric piano
- Bob Cranshaw - bass
- Freddie Waits - drums
- Richard Landrum – congas
- Sonny Morgan - percussion
