= Think Tank (Pat Martino album) =

Studio album by Pat Martino
- Released: 2003
- Recorded: January 8–10, 2003
- Studio: Sony Studios, New York City
- Genre: Jazz
- Label: Blue Note Records; 7243 5 92009 2 7
- Producer: Joseph Donofrio

Pat Martino chronology
Live at Yoshi's (2001)	Think Tank (2003)	Remember: A Tribute to Wes Montgomery (2006)

Think Tank is an album by jazz guitarist Pat Martino. It was recorded in January 2003 at Sony Studios in New York City, and was released by Blue Note Records later that year. On the album, Martino is joined by saxophonist Joe Lovano, pianist Gonzalo Rubalcaba, bassist Christian McBride, and drummer Lewis Nash.

== Reception ==
Professional ratings
Review scores
Source	Rating
AllMusic	4/5 stars
The Penguin Guide to Jazz	2.5/4 stars
The Guardian	4/5 stars
All About Jazz	4.5/5 stars

Think Tank received a 2003 Grammy nomination for Best Jazz Instrumental Album, and "Africa" was nominated for Best Jazz Instrumental Solo.

In a review for AllMusic, Matt Collar stated that the musicians "play with a thoughtful intensity that's both meditative and exploding with improvisational ideas," and commented: "Think Tank is a deep album, but never cold."

PopMatters writer Scott Hreha stated: "Think Tank... manages to bring together all of its disparate elements with a refreshing sense of joy that's elusive in much of today's mainstream jazz. It's good to hear that Pat Martino hasn't given up on the spiritual side of his playing... if this disc is any indication, he may very well just be hitting his stride in this remarkable second phase of his career."

Writing for The Guardian, John Fordham remarked: "On this powerful set... the restrained precision of his playing is... magnificently complemented by the contrasting styles of shrewdly chosen partners. This is probably Martino's best recorded work since his astonishing comeback after years of inaction."

Aaron Steinberg, in a review for Jazz Times, wrote: "In the sense that a think tank is a collection of bright thinkers, guitarist Pat Martino's characterization for his new CD really does hold up for this one-off session... It sounds best when the band breaks down into component parts, as when the guitarist pits his aggressive single-note lines against just bass and drums, or even when Martino sits out and lets his band build some steam for a few bars."

In a review for All About Jazz, Joel Roberts commented: "Martino... is much more subdued than in the past, offering harmonically complex solos that challenge listeners but retain enough recognizable blues and bop roots to be accessible... it's a serious album from a serious artist and well-worth checking out." In a separate AAJ article, Victor L. Schermer stated that the album is "a statement of some essence of what jazz can be today, here and now, as it moves to what it will be in a few days, months, and years... What you have in this album is not a set of 'tunes,' but a series of improvised compositions stamped forever into a recording instead of a musical score. If this is not a landmark in the history of jazz, it is certainly a fully stated testimony to what jazz can be at an artistic level of performance."

== Track listing ==
1. "The Phineas Trane" (Harold Mabern) – 6:36
2. "Think Tank" (Martino) – 12:07
3. "Dozen Down" (Martino) – 7:54
4. "Sun on my Hands" (Jim Ridl) – 9:16
5. "Africa" (John Coltrane) – 11:43
6. "Quatessence" (Martino) – 9:56
7. "Before You Ask" (Martino) – 6:51
8. "Earthlings" (Joe Ford) – 5:32

== Personnel ==
- Pat Martino – guitar
- Joe Lovano – tenor saxophone
- Gonzalo Rubalcaba – piano
- Christian McBride – bass
- Lewis Nash – drums
