= Sources of Inspiration =

Studio album by Donald Brown
- Released: 1990
- Recorded: August 11, 1989
- Studios: Van Gelder Studio, Englewood Cliffs, NJ
- Genre: Jazz
- Length: 51:16
- Labels: Muse; MR 5385
- Producer: Don Sickler

Donald Brown chronology
Early Bird (1988)	Sources of Inspiration (1990)	People Music (1990)

Sources of Inspiration is an album by pianist Donald Brown which was recorded in 1989 and released on Muse Records.

== Reception ==
Professional ratings
Review scores
Source	Rating
AllMusic	3/5 stars

In his review for AllMusic, Scott Yanow wrote "The strong quintet (which also features Eddie Henderson and altoist Gary Bartz) really digs into the diverse originals which are often reminiscent of a Blue Note date circa 1967".

== Track listing ==
All compositions by Donald Brown except where noted

1. "Capetown Ambush" – 6:52
2. "Overtaken by a Moment" – 6:25
3. "Do We Have to Say Goodbye" – 6:26
4. "Embraceable You" (George Gershwin, Ira Gershwin) – 6:45 Additional track on CD release
5. "New York" – 6:31
6. "Phineas" – 7:06
7. "The Insane Asylum" – 4:11 Additional track on CD release
8. "The Human Impersonator" – 8:08

== Personnel ==
- Donald Brown – piano
- Eddie Henderson - trumpet, flugelhorn
- Gary Bartz - soprano saxophone, alto saxophone
- Buster Williams – bass
- Carl Allen – drums
