= Bossa Nova Plus =

Studio album by Willis Jackson
- Released: 1962
- Recorded: October 30, 1962
- Studio: Van Gelder Studio, Englewood Cliffs, New Jersey
- Genre: Bossa nova, latin jazz
- Label: Prestige; PRLP 7260

Willis Jackson chronology
Johnny "Hammond" Cooks with Gator Tail (1962)	Bossa Nova Plus (1962)	Neapolitan Nights (1962)

Bossa Nova Plus (also released as Shuckin') is an album by saxophonist Willis Jackson which was recorded in 1962 and released on the Prestige label.

== Reception ==
Professional ratings
Review scores
Source	Rating
Allmusic	4/5 stars

Allmusic awarded the album 4 stars stating "His second great album that year".

== Track listing ==
1. "Cachita" (Rafael Hernández) – 3:47
2. "I Left My Heart in San Francisco" (George Cory, Douglass Cross) – 3:21
3. "Amor" (Ricardo López Méndez, Gabriel Ruíz) – 7:48
4. "Mama Inez" (L. Wolfe Gilbert, Eliseo Grenet) –
5. "What Kind of Fool Am I?" (Leslie Bricusse, Anthony Newley) – 5:09
6. "Shuckin'" (Willis Jackson) – 5:27

== Personnel ==
- Willis Jackson – tenor saxophone
- Tommy Flanagan – piano
- Kenny Burrell – guitar
- Eddie Calhoun – bass
- Roy Haynes – drums
- Juan Amalbert, Montego Joe – congas
- Jose Paulo – congas, timbales
