= All Sides Now =

Studio album by Pat Martino
- Released: 1997
- Recorded: June 1, 1996 – January 15, 1997
- Genre: Jazz
- Length: 51:56
- Label: Blue Note; BN 37627
- Producer: Bill Milkowski

Pat Martino chronology
Nightwings (1996)	All Sides Now (1997)	Stone Blue (1998)

All Sides Now is an album by guitarist Pat Martino which was recorded in 1996–97 and first released on the Blue Note label. The album pairs Martino with notable guitarists from across the musical spectrum.

== Reception ==
Professional ratings
Review scores
Source	Rating
AllMusic	4/5 stars
Los Angeles Times	2.5/4 stars
The Penguin Guide to Jazz Recordings	3/4 stars

In his review for AllMusic, which awarded the album 4 stars, Scott Yanow wrote, "Veteran Pat Martino is teamed up with a variety of different fellow guitarists on this interesting if not quite essential release... A decent effort, but not up to Pat Martino's most significant." Glen Astarita from All About Jazz was less forgiving noting, "The Blue Note Records debut by guitarist extraordinaire Pat Martino is spotty at best. It is primarily a series of duets and ensemble settings with a wide array of top notch guitarists spanning different genres... The feeling here is that Mr. Martino had been granted a minimal amount of artistic control from the onset. What we have here is something short of a hack job!" The Los Angeles Times critic, Bill Kohlhaase, rated the album 2½ stars writing, "Guitarist Martino, who was forced to relearn his instrument after suffering a brain aneurysm in 1980, retains a solid identity in these diverse collaborations with seven fellow guitarists... Martino brings a measure of feeling that his partners never seem able to match."

== Track listing ==
All compositions by Pat Martino except as indicated

1. "Too High" (Stevie Wonder) – 5:03
2. "Two of a Kind" – 5:54
3. "Progression" – 5:36
4. "I'm Confessin' (That I Love You)" (Doc Daugherty, Al J. Neiburg, Ellis Reynolds) – 4:41
5. "Ellipsis" (Martino, Joe Satriani) – 3:09
6. "Both Sides, Now" (Joni Mitchell) – 3:53
7. "Ayako" – 7:46
8. "Two Days Old" (Michael Hedges) – 5:17
9. "Outrider" – 7:43
10. "Never and After" (Satriani) – 2:54

== Personnel ==
- Pat Martino – guitar
- Charlie Hunter – guitar (track 1)
- Tuck Andress – guitar (track 2)
- Kevin Eubanks – guitar (track 3)
- Les Paul – guitar (track 4)
- Joe Satriani – guitar (track 5 and 10)
- Mike Stern – guitar (track 7 and 9)
- Michael Hedges – guitar (track 8), percussion (track 5)
- Scott Colley – double bass (track 7 and 9)
- Paul Nowinski – bass (track 4)
- Scott Amendola – drums (track 1)
- Ben Perowsky – drums (track 7 and 9)
- Jeff Hirshfield – drums (track 10)
- Cassandra Wilson – vocals (track 6)
