= Loose... =

Studio album by Willis Jackson
- Released: 1963
- Recorded: March 26, 1963
- Studio: Van Gelder Studio, Englewood Cliffs, New Jersey
- Genre: Jazz
- Label: Prestige; PRLP 7273
- Producer: Ozzie Cadena

Willis Jackson chronology
Neapolitan Nights (1962)	Loose... (1963)	Grease 'n' Gravy (1963)

Loose... is an album by saxophonist Willis Jackson which was recorded in 1963 and released on the Prestige label.

== Reception ==
Professional ratings
Review scores
Source	Rating
Allmusic	3/5 stars

Allmusic awarded the album 3 stars stating "Willis with Carl Wilson on Hammond organ".

== Track listing ==
1. "Secret Love" (Sammy Fain, Paul Francis Webster) – 5:00
2. "When My Dreamboat Comes Home" (Cliff Friend, Dave Franklin) – 6:56
3. "She's My Love" (Willis Jackson) – 5:53
4. "Y'All" (Jackson)
5. "After Hours" (Avery Parrish) – 10:29
6. "What Will I Tell My Heart" (Irving Gordon, Jack Lawrence, Peter Tinturin) – 5:36

== Personnel ==
- Willis Jackson – tenor saxophone
- Frank Robinson – trumpet
- Carl Wilson – organ
- Bill Jones – guitar
- Joe Hadrick – drums
