= Grease 'n' Gravy =

Studio album by Willis Jackson
- Released: 1963
- Recorded: May 23–24, 1963
- Studio: Van Gelder Studio, Englewood Cliffs, New Jersey
- Genre: Jazz
- Label: Prestige; PRLP 7285
- Producer: Ozzie Cadena

Willis Jackson chronology
Loose... (1963)	Grease 'n' Gravy (1963)	The Good Life (1963)

Grease 'n' Gravy is an album by saxophonist Willis Jackson which was recorded in 1963 and released on the Prestige label.

== Reception ==
Professional ratings
Review scores
Source	Rating
Allmusic	2.5/5 stars

Allmusic awarded the album 2½ stars stating "It's respectable, not too cool and not too hot early-'60s organ-sax jazz, with Wilson's organ and the still-teenaged Martino's guitar as vital to the success of the date as Jackson's tenor sax is".

== Track listing ==
All compositions by Willis Jackson except where noted.

1. "Brother Elijah" (Jackson, Wade Marcus, William "Mickey" Stevenson) – 5:13
2. "Doot Dat" – 7:23
3. "Stompin' at the Savoy" (Benny Goodman, Andy Razaf, Edgar Sampson, Chick Webb) – 3:13
4. "Gra-a-avy" – 11:42
5. "Grease"- 7:21
- Recorded at Van Gelder Studio in Englewood Cliffs, New Jersey on May 23 (tracks 1 & 2), & May 24 (tracks 3–5), 1963

== Personnel ==
- Willis Jackson – tenor saxophone
- Frank Robinson – trumpet
- Carl Wilson – organ
- Pat Martino – guitar
- Leonard Gaskin – bass (tracks 3–5)
- Joe Hadrick – drums
