= Neapolitan Nights =

Studio album by Willis Jackson
- Released: 1963
- Recorded: December 19, 1962
- Studio: Van Gelder, Englewood Cliffs, New Jersey
- Genre: Jazz
- Label: Prestige; PRLP 7232
- Producer: Ozzie Cadena

Willis Jackson chronology
Bossa Nova Plus (1962)	Neapolitan Nights (1963)	Loose... (1963)

Neapolitan Nights is an album by saxophonist Willis Jackson, recorded in 1962 and released on the Prestige label.

== Reception ==
Professional ratings
Review scores
Source	Rating
AllMusic	3/5 stars
DownBeat	2/5 stars
The Rolling Stone Jazz Record Guide	3/5 stars

AllMusic awarded the album 3 stars.

== Track listing ==
1. "Neapolitan Nights" (Traditional) – 7:00
2. "Arrivederci Roma" (Renato Rascel, Pietro Garinei, Sandro Giovannini) – 5:43
3. "Mama" (Cesare Andrea Bixio)
4. "Volare" (Franco Migliacci, Domenico Modugno)
5. "Al di là" (Carlo Donida, Mogol) -4:46
6. "Verdi's Dance" (Willis Jackson)

== Personnel ==
- Willis Jackson – tenor saxophone
- Gildo Mahones – piano
- Bucky Pizzarelli – guitar
- George Tucker – bass
- Bobby Donaldson – drums
- Montego Joe – congas
