= Pat Martino/Live! =

Live album by Pat Martino
- Released: 1973
- Recorded: September 7, 1972; New York City
- Genre: Jazz
- Length: 38:42
- Label: Muse; MR 5026
- Producer: Don Schlitten

Pat Martino chronology
The Visit! (1972)	Pat Martino/Live! (1973)	Consciousness (1975)

Pat Martino/Live! is a live album by guitarist Pat Martino which was recorded in 1972 and first released on the Muse label.

== Reception ==
Professional ratings
Review scores
Source	Rating
Allmusic	4.5/5 stars
The Rolling Stone Jazz Record Guide	4/5 stars

Allmusic awarded the album 4½ stars stating "Martino performs music that falls between advanced hard bop, fusion and the avant-garde without really fitting into any of the genres. Well worth several listens".

Tom Moon, in his book 1,000 Recordings to Hear Before You Die, wrote: "Whenever you're feeling lethargic, unable to get anything done, cue up 'Sunny' from Pat Martino's famed Live! disc, and prepare to have your clock cleaned. Here, in a solo that lasts more than four minutes, the guitarist motors from one peak to the next with such determination he seems less a jazz musician than a superhero charged with saving Planet Earth."

In an article for All About Jazz, Ian Patterson wrote: "There are only a handful of live recordings of Pat Martino, but this one... is arguably the best... The quartet is on fire on a charging, seventeen-minute version of 'Special Door,' where Martino drags bebop kicking and screaming into funk and avant-garde territory. Even when really attacking the music, however, Martino's warmth of tone, his rhythmic pulse, swing feel and melodicism are ever present."

== Critical acclaim ==
Pat Martino stood out with a style of his own with a well-defined sound in the early 1970s with his numbers like "Special Door," and the pop song "Sunny." His talent outshines his peers for being extraordinarily versatile. Pat Martino has been also referred to as a man who had to struggle to survive because of his health problem that threatened his outstanding career. Considered a guitar prodigy in his early days, he continued to embrace innovation, progress and a distinct technique throughout his career. His music works magic on the listeners and the composers alike as it is marked by the five T’s – tone, time, technique, touch, and taste. He has proved to the music buffs and musicians that he is no short of a legend, an inspiration to followers of any genre.

== Track listing ==
All compositions by Pat Martino except as indicated

1. "Special Door" - 17:46
2. "The Great Stream" - 10:30
3. "Sunny" (Bobby Hebb) - 10:26

== Personnel ==
- Pat Martino - guitar
- Ron Thomas - electric piano
- Tyrone Brown - electric bass
- Sherman Ferguson - drums
