= Consciousness (Pat Martino album) =

Studio album by Pat Martino
- Released: 1975
- Recorded: October 7, 1974; Generation Sound Studio, New York City
- Genre: Jazz
- Length: 43:31
- Label: Muse; MR 5039
- Producer: Michael Cuscuna

Pat Martino chronology
Pat Martino/Live! (1974)	Consciousness (1975)	Starbright (1976)

Consciousness is an album by guitarist Pat Martino which was recorded in 1974 and first released on the Muse label.

== Reception ==
Professional ratings
Review scores
Source	Rating
AllMusic	4.5/5 stars
The Rolling Stone Jazz Record Guide	3/5 stars

In his review on AllMusic, Michael G. Nastos notes that this is "Martino on the way up. Mostly quartet recordings for the brilliant guitarist... Guitar students should study this one."

Tom Moon, in his book 1,000 Recordings to Hear Before You Die, wrote: "Beginning with a spry romp through Coltrane's 'Impressions,' Consciousness offers blindingly bright—yet never glib—Martino solos, each a marvel of structure. To hear an improviser in full control of his resources, check out the curvy bossa nova 'Along Came Betty,' then a pensive solo guitar reading of Joni Mitchell's 'Both Sides Now.'"

Guitarist Russell Malone stated that, when he first heard Consciousness, he "almost wanted to quit playing the guitar. I said, 'Man, what the hell am I trying to play the guitar for when this guy's playing it like that? I'll never get to that level.' That solo on 'Impressions'—whoa!"

== Track listing ==
All compositions by Pat Martino except as indicated

1. "Impressions" (John Coltrane) - 4:33
2. "Consciousness" (Danny Depaolo, Eric Kloss) - 11:48
3. "Passata on Guitar" - 2:48
4. "Along Came Betty" (Benny Golson) - 5:22
5. "Willow" - 6:09
6. "On the Stairs" - 5:29
7. "Both Sides, Now" (Joni Mitchell) - 2:06
8. "Along Came Betty" [Alternate Take] (Golson) - 5:16 Bonus track on CD reissue

== Personnel ==
- Pat Martino - guitar
- Eddie Green - electric piano, percussion
- Tyrone Brown - electric bass
- Sherman Ferguson - drums, percussion
