= Cobblestone Records =

American jazz record label

- Parent company: Buddha Records
- Founded: 1972
- Founder: Joe Fields
- Genre: Jazz
- Country of origin: U.S.
- Location: New York City

Cobblestone Records was an American jazz record label founded by Joe Fields in New York City in 1972.

Cobblestone had two successive incarnations. The earlier was in 1968–69 as a singles label, subsidiary of Buddah Records. (The Joe Thomas LP is drawn from that period.) The singles line went dormant in the early 1970s, until in 1972 a new version of the label was established by Joe Fields in New York City, also as a subsidiary label to Buddah.

Much of what was issued on the label was produced by Don Schlitten. Among the label's releases was a six-album issue of recordings from the Newport Jazz Festival New York of 1972. The label also released previously unissued recordings from Grant Green with Big John Patton.

In a move reflecting an active era of independent record labels, Fields later formed Muse Records, essentially an extension of Cobblestone's approach, with Schlitten producing the initial majority of the output. Later producers included Michael Cuscuna and Fred Seibert. Some of the label's material was later transferred to Muse Records and 32 Jazz.

== Discography ==
=== Albums ===
- 7001: Joe Thomas – Comin' Home
- 9000: Hermeto Pascoal – Hermeto
- 9001: Elmore James – Southside Blues
- 9002: Grant Green – Iron City
- 9003: Richard Davis – The Philosophy of the Spiritual
- 9004: Freddie McCoy – Gimme Some!
- 9005: Neal Creque – Creque
- 9006: Eric Kloss – Doors
- 9007: Ruth Brown – The Real Ruth Brown
- 9008: Chuck Rainey – The Chuck Rainey Coalition
- 9009: Bob Freedman – Journeys of Odysseus
- 9010: The Visitors – Neptune
- 9011: Cedar Walton/Hank Mobley Quintet – Breakthrough!
- 9012: Jimmy Heath – The Gap Sealer
- 9013: Sonny Stitt – Tune–Up!
- 9014: Emanuel K. Rahim & the Kahliqs – Total Submission
- 9015: Pat Martino – The Visit!
- 9016: Bobby Pierce – Introducing Bobby Pierce With Bobby Jones
- 9017: Harold Ousley – The Kid
- 9018: Catalyst – Catalyst
- 9019: Gary McFarland – Requiem for Gary McFarland
- 9020: Steve Kuhn – Steve Kuhn Live in New York
- 9021: Sonny Stitt – Constellation
- 9022: Bobby Jones – The Arrival of Bobby Jones
- 9023: Neal Creque – Contrast!
- 9024: Norman Connors – Dance of Magic
- 9025: (Various) – Newport in New York '72: The Jam Sessions Vol 1 & 2
- 9026: (Various) – Newport in New York '72: The Jam Sessions Vol 3 & 4
- 9027: (Various) – Newport in New York '72 Vol 5: The Jimmy Smith Jam
- 9028: (Various) – Newport in New York '72 Vol 6: The Soul Sessions
- 9032: (Various) – Newport in New York '72
- 9035: Norman Connors – Dark of Light
