= The Maker (Pat Martino album) =

Studio album by Pat Martino
- Released: 1995
- Recorded: September 14, 1994
- Studio: Sound On Sound Recording Studios, New York City
- Genre: Jazz
- Length: 50:47
- Label: Paddlewheel; KICJ 229
- Producer: Paul Bagin

Pat Martino chronology
| Interchange (1994) | The Maker (1995) | Nightwings (1996) |

The Maker is an album by guitarist Pat Martino, recorded in 1994 and released on the Japanese Paddlewheel label.

== Reception ==
Professional ratings
Review scores
| Source | Rating |
|---|---|
| AllMusic | 4/5 stars |
| The Penguin Guide to Jazz Recordings | 3/4 stars |

AllMusic stated that "this is a highly recommended session featuring all original Martino compositions and more proof that the master was indeed back."

The authors of the Penguin Guide to Jazz Recordings wrote: "Ten years on from the comeback, a strong set from an active period."

== Track listing ==
All tracks are written by Pat Martino.

| No. | Title | Length |
|---|---|---|
| 1. | "Noshufuru" | 12:32 |
| 2. | "You're Welcome to a Prayer" | 8:56 |
| 3. | "Changing Tides" | 7:36 |
| 4. | "Yoshiko" | 11:54 |
| 5. | "This Autumn's Ours" | 10:00 |

== Personnel ==
- Pat Martino – guitar
- James Ridl – piano
- Marc Johnson – bass
- Joe Bonadio – drums
