= Willis Jackson (saxophonist) =

American jazz musician (1928–1987)

Willis "Gator" Jackson (April 25, 1932 – October 25, 1987) was an American jazz tenor saxophonist.

== Biography ==
Born in Miami, Florida, Jackson joined Cootie Williams's band in 1948 as a teenager, and was part of it on and off until 1955.

Under his own name (Willis Jackson and His Orchestra) he recorded various rhythm-and-blues instrumentals for Atlantic Records. His most famous record for Atlantic is "Gator's Groove" (1952), with "Estrellita" as the B-side.

Jackson toured as leader of the backing band for singer Ruth Brown. Jackson joined Prestige Records in 1959, making a string of albums.

Jackson died in New York City one week after heart surgery, in October 1987, at the age of 55.

== Personal life ==
Publicly, Jackson and Ruth Brown, the singer with whom he toured as a bandleader, were considered to be married, However, they never legally married but lived together from 1950 to 1955.

== Discography ==
=== As leader ===
- Please Mr. Jackson (Prestige, 1959)
- Cool "Gator" (Prestige, 1959)
- Blue Gator (Prestige, 1960)
- Really Groovin' (Prestige, 1961)
- In My Solitude (Moodsville, 1961)
- Cookin' Sherry (Prestige, 1961)
- Thunderbird (Prestige, 1962)
- Bossa Nova Plus (Prestige, 1963)
- Neapolitan Nights (Prestige, 1963)
- Grease 'n' Gravy (Prestige, 1963)
- The Good Life (Prestige, 1963)
- Loose... (Prestige, 1963)
- Jackson's Action! (Prestige, 1964)
- Boss Shoutin' (Prestige, 1964)
- 'Gator Tails (Verve, 1964)
- More Gravy (Prestige, 1964)
- Together Again! with Jack McDuff (Prestige, 1965)
- Smoking with Willis (Cadet, 1965)
- Live! Action (Prestige, 1966)
- Soul Night/Live! (Prestige, 1966)
- Together Again, Again with Jack McDuff (Prestige, 1967)
- Tell It... (Prestige, 1967)
- Soul Grabber (Prestige, 1968)
- Star Bag with Trudy Pitts, Bill Jennings (Prestige, 1968)
- Swivelhips (Prestige, 1969)
- Gator's Groove (Prestige, 1969)
- Mellow Blues (UpFront, 1970)
- Recording Session (Big Chance, 1972)
- West Africa (Muse, 1974)
- Headed and Gutted (Muse, 1974)
- Funky Reggae (Trip, 1974)
- The Way We Were (Atlantic, 1975)
- Plays with Feeling (Cotillion, 1976)
- In the Alley (Muse, 1977)
- Bar Wars (Muse, 1978)
- The Gator Horn (Muse, 1979)
- Single Action with Pat Martino (Muse, 1980)
- Lockin' Horns with Von Freeman (Muse, 1981)
- Gatorade (Prestige, 1982)
- Nothing Butt... (Muse, 1983)
- Ya Understand Me? (Muse, 1984)

=== As sideman ===
- George Benson, Erotic Moods (Paul Winley, 1978)
- Bo Diddley, Big Bad Bo (Chess, 1974)
- Don McLean, Homeless Brother (United Artists, 1974)
- Johnny "Hammond" Smith, Johnny "Hammond" Cooks with Gator Tail (Prestige, 1962)
