= West Africa (album) =

Studio album by Willis Jackson
- Released: 1974
- Recorded: October 22, 1973
- Genre: Jazz
- Label: Muse; MR 5036

Willis Jackson chronology
Keep On Blowin' (1971)	West Africa (1974)	Headed and Gutted (1974)

West Africa is an album by saxophonist Willis Jackson which was recorded in 1973 and first released on the Muse label.

== Reception ==
Professional ratings
Review scores
Source	Rating
Allmusic	3/5 stars
The Rolling Stone Jazz Record Guide	3/5 stars

Allmusic rated the album with 3 stars.

== Track listing ==
All compositions by Willis Jackson except where noted.

1. "West Africa" – 6:52
2. "A House Is Not a Home" (Burt Bacharach, Hal David) – 5:15
3. "Fungii Mama" 4:07
4. "Don't Misunderstand" – 5:31
5. "The Head Tune" – 9:22
6. "I Love You Yes I Do" (Sally Nix, Henry Glover) – 4:13

== Personnel ==
- Willis Jackson – tenor saxophone
- Ted Dunbar – guitar
- Mickey Tucker – organ, electric piano
- Bob Cranshaw – electric bass
- Freddie Waits – drums
- Richard Landrum – congas, percussion
- Sonny Morgan – percussion
