= The Gator Horn =

Studio album by Willis Jackson
- Released: 1977
- Recorded: March 8, 1977
- Studio: Rosebud Studio, New York City
- Genre: Jazz
- Label: Muse; MR 5146
- Producer: Fred Seibert

Willis Jackson chronology
In the Alley (1976)	The Gator Horn (1977)	Bar Wars (1978)

The Gator Horn is an album by saxophonist Willis Jackson, recorded in 1977 and released on the Muse label.

== Reception ==
Professional ratings
Review scores
Source	Rating
AllMusic	3/5 stars

The Bay State Banner wrote that the album "is simply swinging R&B instrumental stuff, not as complex or innovative as the honkers in the new music camp, but very funky and danceable without resorting to cliches or gimmicks."

In his review on AllMusic, Scott Yanow states that "Jackson's basic tenor always contained plenty of soul, the potential of exploding, and an attractive warm sound... For this fine set, Gator alternates between romps (some of which are funky) and ballads."

== Track listing ==
All compositions by Willis Jackson except where noted.

1. "Ungawa" – 8:32
2. "You've Changed" (Bill Carey, Carl T. Fischer) – 4:45
3. "Hello, Good Luck" (Johnny Griffin) – 7:35
4. "The Gator Horn" – 5:05
5. "This Is Always" (Mack Gordon, Harry Warren) – 5:30
6. "Gooseneck" – 8:15

== Personnel ==
- Willis Jackson – tenor saxophone, "Gator" horn
- Joe Jones – guitar
- Carl Wilson – organ
- Dud Bascomb Jr. – bass
- Yusef Ali – drums
- Buddy Caldwell – congas
