= Baiyina (The Clear Evidence) =

Studio album by Pat Martino
- Released: December 1968
- Recorded: June 11, 1968; New York City
- Genre: Jazz
- Length: 37:55
- Label: Prestige; PR 7589
- Producer: Don Schlitten

Pat Martino chronology
East! (1968)	Baiyina (The Clear Evidence) (1968)	Desperado (1970)

Baiyina (The Clear Evidence) (subtitled A psychedelic excursion through the magical mysteries of the Koran) is the fourth album by guitarist Pat Martino recorded in 1968 and released on the Prestige label.

== Reception ==
Professional ratings
Review scores
Source	Rating
Allmusic	4/5 stars
The Penguin Guide to Jazz Recordings	2/4 stars

Scott Yanow of Allmusic states, "Pat Martino's fourth of five Prestige albums contains plenty of intriguing music... The use of Indian instruments, drones, and unusual time signatures (including 7/4, 9/4, and 10/8) gives the performances the flavor of early fusion, and some of the effects sound a bit dated. However, the results were not overtly commercial, and the leader gets in several noteworthy improvisations".

The authors of the Penguin Guide to Jazz Recordings wrote: "A whiff of incense and patchouli oil, but Martino's own playing stays tough."

Shaun Brady, writing for NPR, stated that the album was evidence that Martino was "stretching further into new inspirations," and that it "forged a kind of impassioned transcendentalism, merging his fervent soloing and muscular swing with meditative drones."

In an article for All About Jazz, Ian Patterson wrote: "Martino... navigates the unusual time signatures with attacking lines that owe more to Coltrane and Shankar than Wes Montgomery.... It is... a fascinating insight into Martino's evolution and stands as a unique entry in his discography."

== Track listing ==
All compositions by Pat Martino

1. "Baiyina" – 11:54
2. "Where Love's a Grown Up God" – 6:35
3. "Israfel" – 6:18
4. "Distant Land" – 13:08

== Personnel ==
- Pat Martino – guitar
- Gregory Herbert – alto saxophone, flute
- Khalil Balakrishna – tambura
- Bobby Rose – guitar
- Richard Davis – bass
- Charlie Persip – drums
- Reggie Ferguson – tabla

=== Production ===
- Don Schlitten – producer
- Richard Alderson – engineer
