= Pat Martino =

American jazz guitarist and composer (1944–2021)

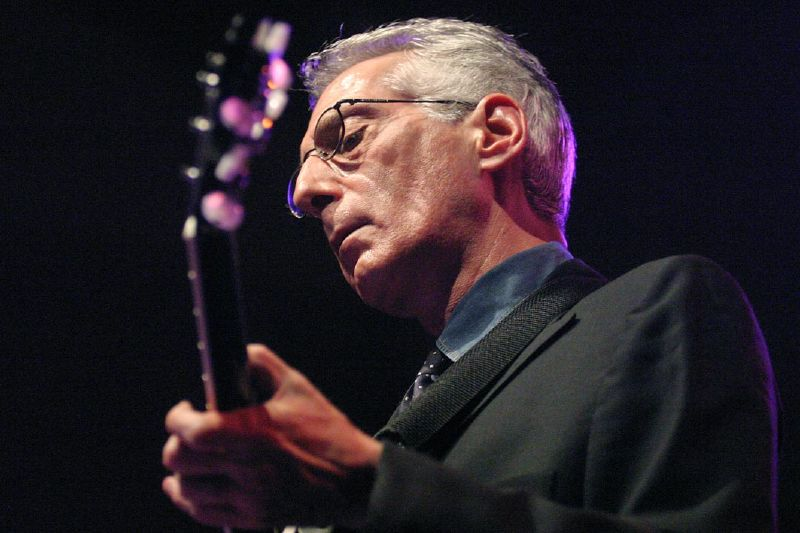

Background information
- Born: Patrick Carmen Azzara; August 25, 1944; Philadelphia, Pennsylvania, U.S.
- Died: November 1, 2021 (aged 77)
- Genres: Jazz fusion, mainstream jazz, soul jazz
- Instrument: Guitar
- Years active: 1959–2018
- Labels: Prestige, Warner Bros, Muse, Blue Note, HighNote,
- Spouse: Ayako Asahi Martino (1997-2021)
- Website: patmartino.com

Pat Martino (born Patrick Carmen Azzara; August 25, 1944 – November 1, 2021) was an American jazz guitarist and composer.

== Early life ==
Martino was born Patrick Carmen Azzara in Philadelphia, Pennsylvania, United States, to father Carmen "Mickey" Azzara (d. 1990) and mother Jean (née Orlando, d. 1989). He was first exposed to jazz by his father, who sang in local clubs and briefly studied guitar.

== Career ==
Martino studied with renowned jazz teacher Dennis Sandole, and in his studio met some of Sandole's other students, among them John Coltrane, James Moody, McCoy Tyner and others. Martino began playing professionally at age 15 after moving to New York City. He lived for a period with Les Paul and began playing at jazz clubs such as Smalls Paradise. Martino later moved into a suite in the President Hotel on 48th Street. He played at Smalls for six months of the year, and played summers at the Club Harlem in Atlantic City, New Jersey.

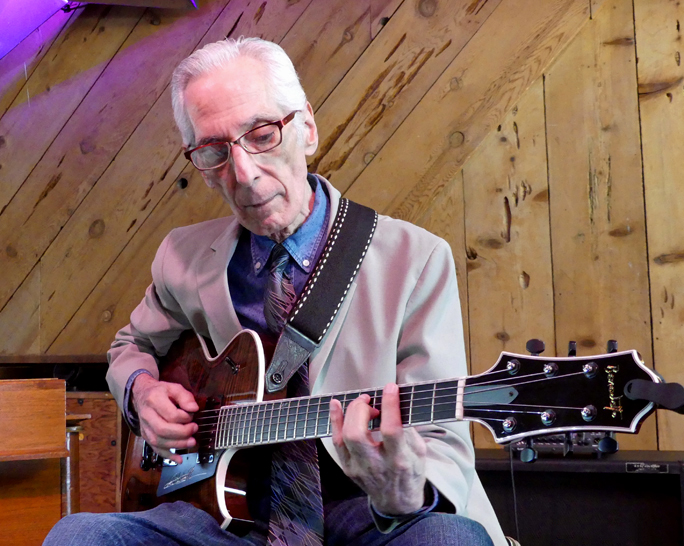
Pat Martino 2018

Martino played and recorded early in his career with Lloyd Price, Willis Jackson, and Eric Kloss. He also worked with jazz organists Charles Earland, Richard "Groove" Holmes, Jack McDuff, Don Patterson, Trudy Pitts, Jimmy Smith, Gene Ludwig, Ray Allen (Raymond Chenot) and Joey DeFrancesco.

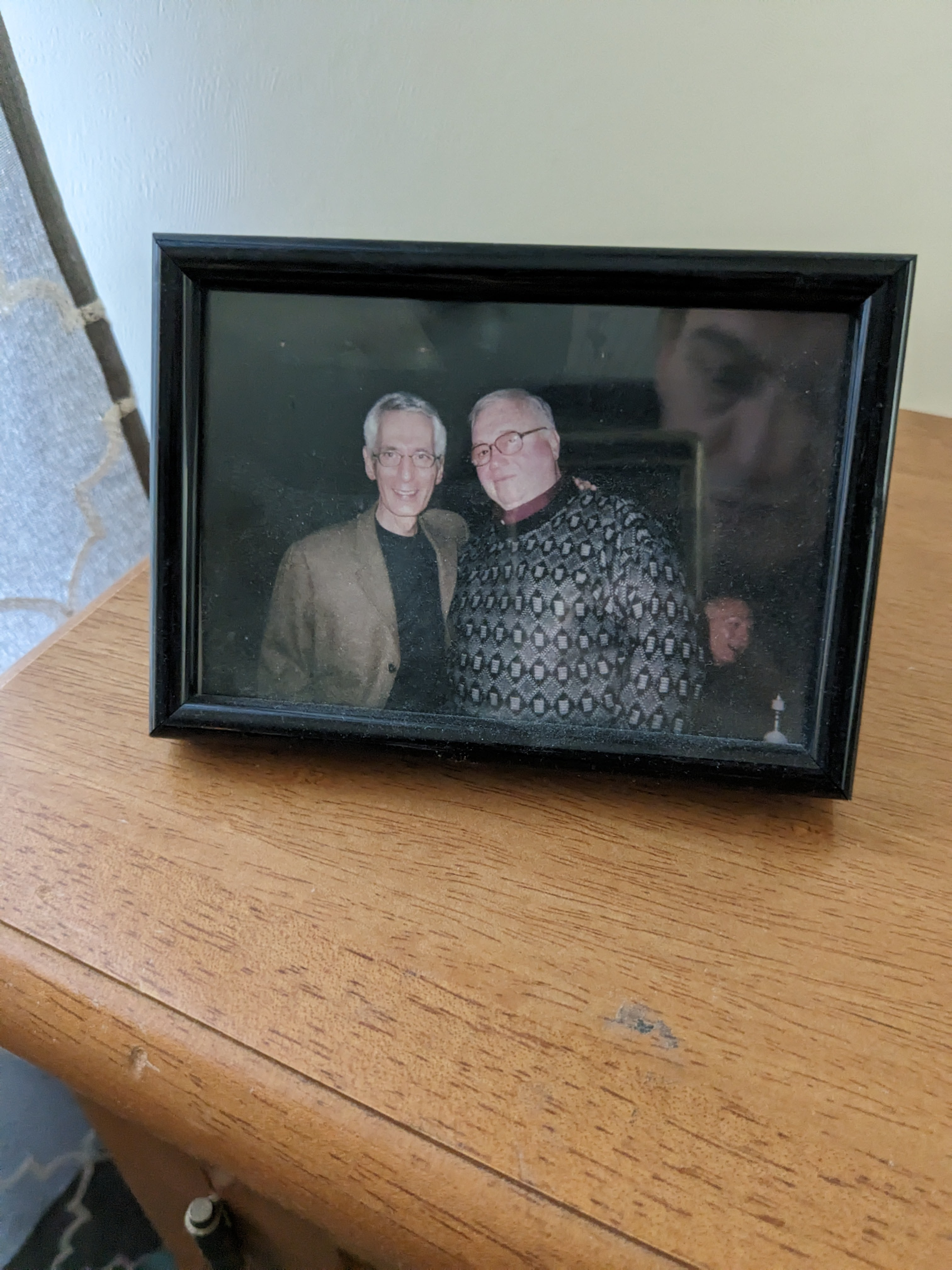
Pat Martino and Ray Allen (Chenot)

In 1980, Martino suffered a hemorrhaged arteriovenous malformation that caused a "near-fatal seizure". The resulting surgery, which removed part of his brain, left him with amnesia and no recollection or knowledge of his career or how to play the instrument that made him successful. Martino said he came out of surgery with complete forgetfulness, and had to learn to focus on the present rather than the past or the possible future. He had to completely re-learn how to play.

He was subsequently chosen as Guitar Player of the Year in the Down Beat magazine Readers' Poll of 2004. In 2006, Mobile Fidelity Sound Lab reissued his album East! on Ultradisc UHR SACD.

In 2017, he created a series of educational videos, A Study of the Opposites and How They Manifest on the Guitar.

Martino's recording career spanned more than 150 releases across multiple major jazz labels, with his work distributed among Prestige, Blue Note, Muse Records and HighNote Records, among others. His discography spans a variety of sounds, such as soul-jazz organ trio work, fusion experimentation, and his post-recovery mainstream recordings.

== Musical style ==
Martino's influences were Les Paul, Johnny Smith, Hank Garland, Joe Pass, and especially Wes Montgomery. To a lesser extent, he was influenced by the guitar stylings of Jim Hall, Mundell Lowe and Barry Galbraith.

Martino said, "There are elements within an instrument’s architecture that initiate a continuous source of valuable information. For the guitar, there are two. The first is the major third interval, and the second is the minor third interval. Once we view their repetitive information, they begin to appear as a series of automatic functions."

Martino's lines contain chromatic links outside any particular IIm7 chord that might be conceptualized over a chord progression, even in the examples he provides in his books and instructional videos. On his bulletin board he has stated that he formulated the system more as a way to explain his playing rather than as something to use to create music. In his own words, "Although the analysis of some of my recorded solos have been referred to as modal, personally I've never operated in that way. I've always depended upon my own melodic instinct, instead of scale-like formulas."

== Legacy ==
Jazz music educator Wolf Marshall said Martino is "a living legend, a national treasure, and an inspiration to musicians and music lovers of all stripes".

== Personal life ==
Martino was married to Ayako Asahi Martino; they met in Tokyo, Japan in 1995. Due to a chronic respiratory disorder, he stopped performing in 2018. He died on November 1, 2021, at the age of 77.

== Awards and honors ==
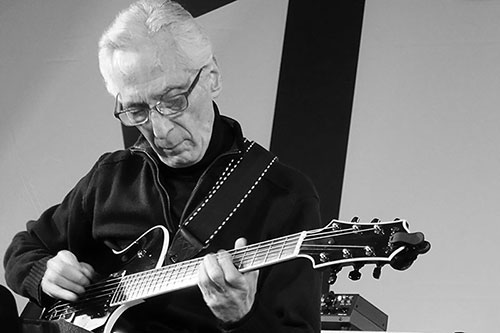
Martino in Denmark, 2015

- 1995 Mellon Jazz Festival dedicated in honor
- 1996 Philadelphia Alliance Walk of Fame Award
- 1997 National Academy of Recording Arts & Sciences Songs from the Heart Award
- 2002 Grammy Award nominations for Best Jazz Instrumental Album, Live at Yoshi's, and Best Jazz Instrumental Solo on "All Blues"
- 2002 National Academy of Recording Arts & Sciences 2nd Annual Heroes Award
- 2003 Grammy nominations for Best Jazz Instrumental Album, Think Tank, and Best Jazz Instrumental Solo on "Africa"
- 2004 Guitar Player of the Year, DownBeat Magazine's 2004 Readers' Poll
- 2016 Pennsylvania State Senator Vincent Hughes and his wife Sheryl Lee Ralph-Hughes presented Pat Martino with the Jazz Legacy Award

== Discography ==
=== As leader ===
- El Hombre (Prestige, 1967)
- Strings! (Prestige, 1967)
- East! (Prestige, 1968)
- Baiyina (The Clear Evidence) (Prestige, 1968)
- Desperado (Prestige, 1970)
- The Visit! (Cobblestone, 1972)
- Pat Martino/Live! (Muse, 1974)
- Consciousness (Muse, 1975)
- Starbright (Warner Bros., 1976)
- We'll Be Together Again (Muse, 1976)
- Joyous Lake (Warner Bros., 1977)
- Exit (Muse, 1977)
- The Return (Muse, 1987)
- Interchange (Muse, 1994)
- The Maker (Paddle Wheel, 1995) – rec. 1994
- Nightwings (Muse, 1996) – rec. 1994
- All Sides Now (Blue Note, 1997) – rec. 1996–1997
- Stone Blue (Blue Note, 1998)
- Live at Yoshi's (Blue Note, 2001)
- Think Tank (Blue Note, 2003)
- Remember: A Tribute to Wes Montgomery (Blue Note, 2006)
- Undeniable: Live at Blues Alley (HighNote, 2011)
- Alone Together (HighNote, 2012)
- We Are Together Again (Warner Music Japan, 2013)
- Young Guns (HighNote, 2014)
- Nexus (HighNote, 2015)
- Formidable (HighNote, 2017)

=== As sideman ===
With Eric Alexander

- The First Milestone (Milestone, 2000)
- The Real Thing (HighNote, 2015)

With Willis Jackson

- Grease 'n' Gravy (Prestige, 1963)
- The Good Life (Prestige, 1963)
- Jackson's Action! (Prestige, 1964)
- Boss Shoutin' (Prestige, 1964)
- More Gravy (Prestige, 1964)
- Live! Action (Prestige, 1965)
- Soul Night/Live! (Prestige, 1966)
- Tell It... (Prestige, 1967)
- Headed and Gutted (Muse, 1974)
- Bar Wars Bar Wars (Muse, 1978)
- Single Action (Muse, 1980)
- Nothing Butt... (Muse, 1983)

With Eric Kloss

- Introducing Eric Kloss (Prestige, 1965)
- Life Force (Prestige, 1968)
- Sky Shadows (Prestige, 1968)
- Consciousness! (Prestige, 1970)
- One, Two, Free (Muse, 1972)

With Jack McDuff

- Walk on By (Prestige, 1966)
- Hallelujah Time! (Prestige, 1967)
- The Midnight Sun (Prestige, 1968)
- Soul Circle (Prestige, 1968)
- I Got a Woman (Prestige, 1969)
- Steppin' Out (Prestige, 1969)

With Charles McPherson

- From This Moment On! (Prestige, 1968)
- Horizons (Prestige, 1969)

With Don Patterson

- Holiday Soul (Prestige, 1965)
- Four Dimensions (Prestige, 1967)
- Boppin' & Burnin' (Prestige, 1968)
- Opus De Don (Prestige, 1968)
- Funk You! (Prestige, 1968)
- Oh Happy Day (Prestige, 1969)
- These Are Soulful Days (Muse, 1974)

With Trudy Pitts

- Introducing the Fabulous Trudy Pitts (Prestige, 1967)
- These Blues of Mine (Prestige, 1967)

With others

- Peter Block, Ustad Habib Khan, Ilya Rayzman and Zakir Hussain, Fire Dance (Mythos, 1997)
- Royce Campbell, Six by Six (Paddle Wheel [Japan], 1994)
- Cyrus Chestnut, A Charlie Brown Christmas (Atlantic, 2000)
- Stanley Clarke, Children of Forever (Polydor, 1973)
- Joey DeFrancesco, Ballads and Blues (Concord, 2002)
- Charles Earland Tribute Band, Keepers of the Flame (HighNote, 2002) with Joey DeFrancesco
- Gil Goldstein, Randy Brecker, David Sanborn, Herbie Mann, John Patitucci, Disney Adventures in Jazz (Walt Disney [UK], 2001)
- John Handy, New View (Columbia, 1967)
- Jimmy Heath, The Time and the Place (Landmark, 1994)
- Woody Herman, The Raven Speaks (Fantasy, 1972)
- Richard "Groove" Holmes, Get Up & Get It! (Prestige, 1967)
- Barry Miles, White Heat (Mainstream, 1971)
- The Philadelphia Experiment (Rope-a-Dope, 2001)
- Lee Ritenour, 6 String Theory (Concord, 2010)
- Michael Sagmeister, Conversation (Acoustic Music, 2000)
- Sonny Stitt, Night Letter (Prestige, 1969)

== Bibliography ==
- Martino, Pat; Milkowski, Bill (2011). Here and Now! The Autobiography of Pat Martino. Backbeat Books. ISBN 978-1617130274.

== Other sources ==
- Marshall, Wolf (Winter 1991) Pat Martino. Guitar Extra Volume 1 No. 4.
- Marshall, Wolf (November 2005) Pat Martino: Legend, Treasure, Inspiration. Vintage Guitar Magazine.
