= The Visit (Pat Martino album) =

The Visit!

Studio album by Pat Martino
- Released: 1972
- Recorded: March 24, 1972; New York City
- Genre: Jazz
- Length: 38:03
- Label: Cobblestone; CST 9015
- Producer: Don Schlitten

Pat Martino chronology
Desperado (1970)	The Visit! (1972)	Pat Martino/Live! (1974)

The Visit! (also released as Footprints) is an album by guitarist Pat Martino which was recorded in 1972 and first released on the Cobblestone label.

== Reception ==
Professional ratings
Review scores
Source	Rating
AllMusic	4.5/5 stars
The Rolling Stone Jazz Record Guide	3/5 stars

AllMusic awarded the album 4½ stars stating "Originally released by Cobblestone and later by Muse, this 1997 CD reissue from 32 Jazz features the distinctive and exploratory guitarist Pat Martino in a tribute to Wes Montgomery... Martino stretches out on six selections, including a bluesy original ("The Visit"), "Footprints," and "Alone Together," always sounding like himself and pushing the boundaries of straight-ahead jazz".

In a review for Jazz Times, Jim Ferguson wrote: "While the album's length is brief by today's standards... it's Martino’s musicality – here at the height of its powers – that makes Footprints a jazz guitar classic."

Douglas Payne, writing for All About Jazz, stated: "Footprints clearly outlines some of Martino's most beautiful traits—crisp, logical, narrative lines; nothing hurried or studied but, rather, a most thoughtful statement of heartfelt intention... Footprints stands as one of Pat Martino's very best. The musicianship is superior, dynamic and attention grabbing. Best of all, this ideal quartet's interplay is outstanding and often astounding. Very highly recommended."

== Track listing ==
1. "The Visit" (Pat Martino) - 4:34
2. "What Are You Doing the Rest of Your Life?" (Alan Bergman, Marilyn Bergman, Michel Legrand) - 7:18
3. "Road Song" (Wes Montgomery) - 5:43
4. "Footprints" (Wayne Shorter) - 8:22
5. "How Insensitive" (Norman Gimbel, Antônio Carlos Jobim, Vinícius de Moraes) - 6:13
6. "Alone Together" (Howard Dietz, Arthur Schwartz) - 5:52

== Personnel ==
- Pat Martino - guitar
- Bobby Rose - guitar
- Richard Davis - bass
- Billy Higgins - drums
