= More Gravy =

More Gravy!

Studio album by Collard Greens & Gravy
- Released: 2000
- Studio: Soundhouse
- Label: Black Market
- Producers: John Durr and Collard Greens & Gravy

Collard Greens & Gravy chronology
| Collard Greens & Gravy (1999) | More Gravy! (2000) | Silver Bird (2003) |

More Gravy! is the second studio album, by Australian blues band, Collard Greens & Gravy. At the ARIA Music Awards of 2001, the album won Best Blues and Roots Album. The group's line-up was James Bridges on guitar and fiddle, Ian Collard on lead vocals, harmonica and guitar, and Anthony Shortte on drums. It was recorded live-in-the-studio at Soundhouse Studios, produced by John Durr and released on his Black Market Music label.

== Reception ==
Australian musicologist, Ian McFarlane, described how the group's, "energetic foot-stomping, country blues sound tapped into the very roots of the genre." Patrick Donovan of The Age observed, "[their] local brand of swampy countrified electric blues has earned them a reputation as the best blues band in the land." Mark Watson observed, "Crisp woody vocals throughout coupled with [Collard]'s sizzling harmonica style, make this another stand-out album, one that yet again defies a justifiable description."

== Track listing ==
More Gravy (2000) – Black Market Music (BMM 240.2)

1. "You Put Your Spell on Me" - 2:59
2. "Pretty Thing" - 2:40
3. "Hate to See You Go" - 2:56
4. "More Gravy" - 4:57
5. "Leavin' You" - 4:05
6. "Your Gonna Need My Help" - 4:01
7. "Goin' Down South" - 5:16
8. "Tell Me Babe" - 3:41
9. "Gonna Wait Till a Change Come" - 3:17
10. "Do My Thing" - 3:40
11. "Change My Ways" - 3:22
12. "Gravy Groan" - 2:51
13. "Goin' Home" - 2:54
14. "Cluck Ol' Hen" - 2:04

== Personnel ==
- James Bridges – guitar, fiddle
- Ian Collard – lead vocals, harmonica, guitar
- Anthony Shortte – drums
- John Durr – producer
- Robert B Dillon – recording engineer, mixing engineer
- James Aitken – assistant engineer
- John Ruberto – mastering engineer
- Andrew Rosenfelt – booklet photographer
- Ross Campbell – back cover photographer
- Black Widow Graphic Design – cover design, artwork
