= Tate Houston =

American saxophonist

Tate Houston (November 30, 1924 – October 18, 1974) was a Detroit-based American baritone and tenor saxophonist.

He played with Lionel Hampton's band and in 1946, he recorded with the Billy Eckstine band. In 1947, he played with Sonny Stitt and Milt Jackson, with whom he would continue to play, and record, into the early 1960s, and in 1948, he recorded with JC Heard's septet in a horn section comprising Joe Newman, Bennie Green, and Wardell Gray.

In February 1949, he recorded as part of the Hal Singer Sextet, which included Chippy Outcalt, Walter Buchanan, George "Butch" Ballard, and in April and June that year, he played on NY recording sessions for RCA Victor, backing Big John Greer. Musicians at those sessions were Frank Galbreath (trumpet), Zolman "Pork" Cohen (trombone), Tony Scott (clarinet), Big John Greer (tenor saxophone, vocals), Houston (on baritone and tenor saxes), Leroy Lovett (piano), Danny Perri (guitar), Henry Holmes (bass) and Art Blakey (drums).

He was headlined with Phil Hill's trio at Detroit's Blue Bird Inn jazz club, until 1949, when he was replaced by Frank Foster. That October Charlie Parker had jammed with the group.

At the Blue Bird he also played in line-ups with Milt Jackson, Alvin Jackson, Billy Mitchell and Tommy Flanagan. In 1960, he recorded as a member of Jackson's octet, with Henry Boozier (trumpet) Tom McIntosh (trombone) Jimmy Heath (tenor saxophone), Tommy Flanagan (piano), Alvin Jackson (bass) and Connie Kay (drums). That same year, he appeared on Nat Adderley's That's Right! as part of a sax section comprising Julian "Cannonball" Adderley, Yusef Lateef, Jimmy Heath and Charlie Rouse. The album was actually credited to Nat Adderley and the Big Sax Section.

In 1961, he recorded as part of a line-up led by bassist Sam Jones, comprising Cannonball Adderley, Jimmy Heath, Victor Feldman, Houston, Nat Adderley, Louis Hayes, Keter Betts, Les Spann, Wynton Kelly, Melba Liston and Blue Mitchell.

== Discography ==
As sideman

- 1949: Happy Days – Hal Singer Sextet
- 1957: Bone & Bari – Curtis Fuller
- 1957: Boy with Lots of Brass – Maynard Ferguson (EmArcy)
- 1957: Moody's Mood for Love – James Moody
- 1960: That's Right! – Nat Adderley
- 1960: Vibrations – Milt Jackson (Atlantic)
- 1960: The Centaur And The Phoenix – Yusef Lateef (Riverside)
- 1961: The Chant – Sam Jones Plus 10 (Riverside)
- 1962: The Magic Touch – Tadd Dameron (Riverside RLP 419)
- 1962: Big Bags – Milt Jackson Orchestra (Riverside)
- 1965: Lonely Avenue – Freddie McCoy Septet – Recorded at the Rudy Van Gelder Studio, Englewood Cliffs, NJ, January 25, 1965 (Prestige)
- 1965: Killer Joe's International Discotheque – Killer Joe Piro with King Curtis, Houston, Cornell Dupree, Eric Gale and Chuck Rainey, among others.
- 1971: What's Going On – Marvin Gaye (Tamla)
