= Peas 'n' Rice =

Studio album by Freddie McCoy
- Released: 1967
- Recorded: October 6, 1965 April 10, 1967 and May 4, 1967
- Studio: Van Gelder Studio, Englewood Cliffs, New Jersey
- Genre: Jazz
- Label: Prestige; PR 7487
- Producer: Cal Lampley

Freddie McCoy chronology
Funk Drops (1966)	Peas 'n' Rice (1967)	Beans & Greens (1967)

Peas 'n' Rice is the fourth album by American jazz vibraphonist Freddie McCoy which was recorded in 1967 (with one track from a session in 1965) for the Prestige label.

== Reception ==
Professional ratings
Review scores
Source	Rating
Allmusic	2/5 stars

Allmusic rated the album 2 stars.

== Track listing ==
All compositions by Freddie McCoy except where noted.

1. "Peas 'n' Rice" – 4:00
2. "Summer in the City" (John Sebastian, Mark Sebastian, Steve Boone) – 2:45
3. "Huh!" – 4:05
4. "1-2-3" (John Medora, David White, Len Barry) – 4:15
5. "One Cylinder" – 3:07
6. "Call Me" (Tony Hatch) – 3:30
7. "Lightning Strikes" – 2:30
8. "My Funny Valentine" (Richard Rodgers, Lorenz Hart) – 6:00
9. "You Stepped Out of a Dream" (Nacio Herb Brown, Gus Kahn) – 4:00
- Recorded at Van Gelder Studio in Englewood Cliffs, New Jersey on October 6, 1965 (track 9), April 10, 1967 (tracks 2, 3 & 5–7) and May 4, 1967 (tracks 1, 4 & 8)

== Personnel ==
- Freddie McCoy – vibraphone
- Wilbur "Dud" Buscomb, Edward David Williams – trumpet (tracks 2, 3 & 5–7)
- JoAnne Brackeen (tracks 1–8), Charles L. Wilson (track 9) – piano
- Wally Richardson – guitar (tracks 2, 3 & 5–7)
- Steve Davis – bass (track 9)
- Eustis Guillemet – electric bass, bass (tracks 1–8)
- Rudy Lawless (track 9), Ray Lucas (tracks 2, 3 & 5–7), Kalil Madi (tracks 1, 4 & 8) – drums
- Dave Blume – arranger, conductor (tracks 2, 3 & 5–7)
