= The Stinger (album) =

Studio album by Johnny "Hammond" Smith
- Released: 1965
- Recorded: May 7, 1965
- Studio: Van Gelder Studio, Englewood Cliffs, NJ
- Genre: Jazz
- Length: 32:03
- Label: Prestige; PR 7408
- Producer: Cal Lampley

Johnny "Hammond" Smith chronology
| A Little Taste (1963) | The Stinger (1965) | The Stinger Meets the Golden Thrush (1966) |

The Stinger is an album by jazz organist Johnny "Hammond" Smith recorded for the Prestige label in 1965.

== Reception ==
Professional ratings
Review scores
| Source | Rating |
|---|---|
| Allmusic | 3/5 stars |

The Allmusic site awarded the album 3 stars stating "The Stinger is worth picking up for its cover alone -- for reasons beyond comprehension, the pop-art sleeve sports a vintage drawing of the classic DC Comics hero Green Lantern, bizarrely re-colored to feature a red and yellow costume. A casual, after-hours insouciance permeates the grooves inside -- although the arrangements and mood fit squarely within the soul jazz tradition, the performances also bear a dusky allure rooted firmly in the blues".

== Track listing ==
All compositions by Johnny "Hammond" Smith except where noted

1. "The Stinger" - 6:40
2. "There Is No Greater Love" (Isham Jones, Marty Symes) - 5:30
3. "Brother John" - 3:55
4. "Cleopatra and the African Knight" - 4:55
5. "You Don't Know What Love Is" (Gene de Paul, Don Raye) - 6:50
6. "Benny's Diggin'" - 4:15

== Personnel ==
- Johnny "Hammond" Smith - organ
- Houston Person (tracks 1, 4 & 6) - tenor saxophone
- Earl Edwards (tracks 1, 2, 3 & 5) - tenor saxophone
- Floyd Smith - guitar
- John Harris - drums

=== Production ===
- Cal Lampley - producer
- Rudy Van Gelder - engineer
