= Lonely Avenue (Freddie McCoy album) =

Studio album by Freddie McCoy
- Released: 1965
- Recorded: January 25 and February 16, 1965
- Studio: Van Gelder Studio, Englewood Cliffs, New Jersey
- Genre: Jazz
- Length: 40:18
- Label: Prestige; PR 7395
- Producer: Cal Lampley

Freddie McCoy chronology
Lonely Avenue (1965)	Spider Man (1966)

Lonely Avenue is the debut album by American jazz vibraphonist Freddie McCoy which was recorded in 1965 for the Prestige label.

== Reception ==
Professional ratings
Review scores
Source	Rating
Allmusic	3/5 stars

Allmusic rated the album 3 stars.

== Track listing ==
All compositions by Freddie McCoy except where noted.

1. "Lonely Avenue" (Doc Pomus) – 2:25
2. "Roëll" – 4:20
3. "Collard Greens" – 2:30
4. "When Sunny Gets Blue" (Jack Segal, Marvin Fischer) – 4:35
5. "Harlem Nocturne" (Earle Hagen, Dick Rogers) – 4:25
6. "Willow Weep for Me" (Ann Ronell) – 3:40
7. "Belly Full of Greens" – 2:30
8. "Feeling Good" (Anthony Newley, Leslie Bricusse) – 3:00
- Recorded at Van Gelder Studio in Englewood Cliffs, New Jersey on January 25 (tracks 1–4) and February 16 (tracks 5–8), 1965

== Personnel ==
- Freddie McCoy – vibraphone
- Gil Askey – trumpet, arranger
- Tate Houston – baritone saxophone
- Dickie Harris – trombone (tracks 5–8)
- James Thomas – organ
- Napoleon Allen – guitar (tracks 1–4)
- Martin Rivera – bass
- Ray Lucas – drums
