= Opus De Funk =

Opus De Funk or Opus de Funk may refer to:

- Opus De Funk (album), a studio album by Johnny "Hammond" Smith
- "Opus de Funk" (composition), a jazz standard composed by Horace Silver
