= Beans & Greens =

Studio album by Freddie McCoy
- Released: 1968
- Recorded: October 2 & 4, 1967
- Studio: Van Gelder Studio, Englewood Cliffs, New Jersey
- Genre: Jazz
- Length: 33:09
- Label: Prestige; PR 7542
- Producer: Cal Lampley

Freddie McCoy chronology
| Peas 'n' Rice (1967) | Beans & Greens (1968) | Soul Yogi (1968) |

Beans & Greens is the fifth album by American jazz vibraphonist Freddie McCoy which was recorded in 1967 for the Prestige label.

== Reception ==
Professional ratings
Review scores
| Source | Rating |
|---|---|
| Allmusic | 2/5 stars |

Allmusic rated the album 2 stars.

== Track listing ==
All compositions by Freddie McCoy except where noted.

1. "Beans & Greens" – 4:30
2. "Tony's Pony 3:40
3. "A Whiter Shade of Pale" (Gary Brooker, Keith Reid, Matthew Fisher) – 4:04
4. "I Was Made To Love Her" (Stevie Wonder, Lula Mae Hardaway, Henry Cosby, Sylvia Moy) – 2:05
5. "You Keep Me Hangin' On" (Lamont Dozier, Brian Holland, Eddie Holland) – 3:00
6. "Take My Love (And Shove It Up Your Heart)" – 3:20
7. "Sixth Avenue Stroll" – 5:20
8. "Makin' Whoopee" (Walter Donaldson, Gus Kahn) – 4:20
9. "Doxy" (Sonny Rollins) – 2:50
- Recorded at Van Gelder Studio in Englewood Cliffs, New Jersey on October 2, 1965 (tracks 2–6) and October 4, 1967 (tracks 1 & 7–9)

== Personnel ==
- Freddie McCoy – vibraphone
- Wilbur "Dud" Buscomb, Edward David Williams – trumpet (tracks 2–6)
- JoAnne Brackeen – piano
- Wally Richardson – guitar (tracks 2–6)
- Dave Blume – organ
- Joseph Macho (tracks 2–6) Don Payne (tracks 1 & 7–9) – electric bass
- Ray Lucas – drums
