= Listen Here (Freddie McCoy album) =

1968 studio album by Freddie McCoy

Studio album by Freddie McCoy
- Released: 1968
- Recorded: June 10, 1968
- Studio: Van Gelder Studio, Englewood Cliffs, New Jersey
- Genre: Jazz
- Length: 36:20
- Label: Prestige; PR 7582
- Producer: Cal Lampley

Freddie McCoy chronology
Soul Yogi (1968)	Listen Here (1968)	Gimme Some! (1971)

Listen Here is the seventh album by American jazz vibraphonist Freddie McCoy, which was recorded in 1968 for the Prestige label.

== Reception ==
Professional ratings
Review scores
Source	Rating
Allmusic	2/5 stars

AllMusic rated the album 2 stars.

== Track listing ==
All compositions by Freddie McCoy except where noted.

1. "Don't Tell Me That" – 5:00
2. "Short Circuit" – 6:50
3. "Love for Sale" (Cole Porter) – 5:30
4. "Listen Here" (Eddie Harris) – 7:40
5. "MacArthur Park" (Jimmy Webb) – 8:00
6. "Stone Wall" – 3:20

== Personnel ==
- Freddie McCoy – vibraphone
- Wilbur Buscomb, Edward Williams – trumpet (tracks 1 & 5)
- Quentin Jackson, Melba Liston – trombone (track 1 & 5)
- Gene Walker – alto saxophone, varitone (tracks 1 & 5)
- JoAnne Brackeen – electric piano, organ
- Wally Richardson – guitar (tracks 1 & 5)
- Raymond McKinney – bass (tracks 2–4 & 6)
- Jimmy Lewis – electric bass (tracks 1 & 5)
- Bernard Purdie (tracks 1 & 5), Al Dreares (track 2–4 & 6)
- Montego Joe – congas (tracks 1 & 5)
