= Nasty! =

Studio album by Johnny "Hammond" Smith
- Released: 1968
- Recorded: June 18, 1968
- Studio: Van Gelder Studio, Englewood Cliffs, NJ
- Genre: Jazz
- Length: 42:44
- Label: Prestige; PR 7588
- Producer: Cal Lampley

Johnny "Hammond" Smith chronology
| Dirty Grape (1968) | Nasty! (1968) | Soul Talk (1969) |

Nasty! is an album by jazz organist Johnny "Hammond" Smith recorded for the Prestige label in 1968. The album is notable as the first recording featuring guitarist John Abercrombie.

== Reception ==
Professional ratings
Review scores
| Source | Rating |
|---|---|
| Allmusic | 3/5 stars |

The Allmusic site awarded the album 3 stars stating "in a sense it's run-of-the-mill as far as Prestige late-'60s soul-jazz goes: quite fine grooves, a dependable yet somewhat predictable house sound, and a reliance upon cover versions for much of the material (two-thirds of the songs, in this case). It's solidly executed, though, in a lean fashion that, to its credit, runs counter to the more excessive arrangements that were creeping into soul-jazz around this time".

== Track listing ==
All compositions by Johnny "Hammond" Smith except where noted:

1. "If I Were a Bell" (Frank Loesser) - 8:39
2. "Song for My Father" (Horace Silver) - 7:18
3. "Speak Low" (Ogden Nash, Kurt Weill) - 6:43
4. "Unchained Melody" (Alex North, Hy Zaret) - 3:48
5. "Nasty" - 9:06
6. "Four Bowls of Soul" - 7:10

== Personnel ==
- Johnny "Hammond" Smith - organ
- Houston Person - tenor saxophone
- John Abercrombie - guitar
- Grady Tate - drums

=== Production ===
- Cal Lampley - producer
- Rudy Van Gelder - engineer
