= Funk Drops =

Album by Freddie McCoy

Studio album by Freddie McCoy
- Released: 1966
- Recorded: June 21–22, 1966
- Studio: Van Gelder Studio, Englewood Cliffs, New Jersey
- Genre: Jazz
- Length: 34:05
- Label: Prestige; PR 7470
- Producer: Cal Lampley

Freddie McCoy chronology
Spider Man (1965)	Funk Drops (1966)	Peas 'n' Rice (1967)

Funk Drops is the third album by American jazz vibraphonist Freddie McCoy which was recorded in 1966 for the Prestige label.

== Reception ==
Professional ratings
Review scores
Source	Rating
Allmusic	2/5 stars

Allmusic rated the album 2 stars.

== Track listing ==
All compositions by Freddie McCoy except where noted.

1. "My Babe" (Willie Dixon) – 3:00
2. "And I Love Her" (John Lennon, Paul McCartney) – 6:00
3. "High Heel Sneakers" (Robert Higgenbotham) – 3:25
4. "Moyé" – 6:30
5. "Funk Drops" – 3:15
6. "Tough Talk" (Wayne Henderson, Joe Sample, Stix Hooper) – 3:30
7. "Theodora" (Billy Taylor) – 4:05
8. "The Sleepy Lagoon" (Eric Coates, Jack Lawrence) – 4:20
- Recorded at Van Gelder Studio in Englewood Cliffs, New Jersey on June 21 (tracks 1, 5 & 8) and June 22 (tracks 2–4, 6 & 7), 1965

== Personnel ==
- Freddie McCoy – vibraphone
- James Robinson – trumpet (tracks 1, 5 & 8)
- Laurdine Patrick – baritone saxophone (tracks 1, 5 & 8)
- John Blair – electric violin (tracks 1, 5 & 8)
- JoAnne Brackeen – piano (tracks 2–4, 6 & 7)
- Alfred Williams – organ (tracks 1, 5 & 8)
- Augustus Turner – bass (tracks 2–4, 6 & 7)
- Albert Winston – electric bass (tracks 1, 5 & 8)
- Bernard Purdie (tracks 1, 5 & 8), George Scott (tracks 2–4, 6 & 7) – drums
