= Dirty Grape =

Studio album by Johnny "Hammond" Smith
- Released: 1968
- Recorded: January 31, 1968
- Studio: Van Gelder Studio, Englewood Cliffs, NJ
- Genre: Jazz
- Length: 36:47
- Label: Prestige; PR 7564
- Producer: Cal Lampley

Johnny "Hammond" Smith chronology
| Soul Flowers (1967) | Dirty Grape (1968) | Nasty! (1968) |

Dirty Grape is an album by jazz organist Johnny "Hammond" Smith recorded for the Prestige label in 1968.

== Reception ==
Professional ratings
Review scores
| Source | Rating |
|---|---|
| Allmusic | 3/5 stars |

The Allmusic site awarded the album 3 stars calling it a "pleasant but moderately by-numbers set of late 1960s soul-jazz".

== Track listing ==
All compositions by Johnny "Hammond" Smith except where noted

1. "Hi-Heel Sneakers" (Robert Higginbotham) - 5:47
2. "To Sir With Love" (Don Black, Mark London) - 3:34
3. "Dirty Grape" (Wally Richardson) - 3:05
4. "Animal Farm" - 8:13
5. "Black Strap Molasses" (Richardson) - 3:11
6. "She's Gone Again" - 3:32
7. "Love Is a Hurtin' Thing" (Dave Linden, Ben Raleigh) - 3:45
8. "Please Send Me Someone to Love" (Percy Mayfield) - 5:30

== Personnel ==
- Johnny "Hammond" Smith - organ
- Earl Edwards, Houston Person - tenor saxophone
- Wally Richardson - guitar
- Jimmy Lewis - electric bass
- John Harris - drums
- Richie "Pablo" Landrum - congas

=== Production ===
- Cal Lampley - producer
- Rudy Van Gelder - engineer
