= Gettin' Up (album) =

Studio album by Johnny "Hammond" Smith
- Released: 1967
- Recorded: March 3, 1967
- Studio: Van Gelder Studio, Englewood Cliffs, NJ
- Genre: Jazz
- Length: 32:45
- Label: Prestige; PR 7494
- Producer: Cal Lampley

Johnny "Hammond" Smith chronology
Love Potion #9 (1966)	Gettin' Up (1967)	Soul Flowers (1967)

Gettin' Up (also released as Ebb Tide) is an album by jazz organist Johnny "Hammond" Smith recorded for the Prestige label in 1967.

== Reception ==
Professional ratings
Review scores
Source	Rating
Allmusic	4.5/5 stars

The Allmusic site awarded the album 4½ stars stating "This is superior organ-soul-jazz with a feistier edge than much of the genre... there's a brash energy that makes it a cut or two above the norm".

== Track listing ==
All compositions by Johnny "Hammond" Smith except where noted

1. "The Sin-In" - 4:20
2. "Stand By Me" (Ben E. King, Jerry Leiber, Mike Stoller) - 2:40
3. "Knock On Wood" (Eddie Floyd, Steve Cropper) - 2:45
4. "The Soulful Blues" - 7:25
5. "Ebb Tide" (Robert Maxwell, Carl Sigman) - 2:40
6. "Summertime" (George Gershwin, Ira Gershwin, DuBose Heyward) - 3:30
7. "Gettin' Up" - 6:10
8. "The 'In' Crowd" (Billy Page) - 3:15

== Personnel ==
- Johnny "Hammond" Smith - organ
- Virgil Jones - trumpet
- Houston Person - tenor saxophone
- Thornel Schwartz - guitar
- Jimmy Lewis - electric bass
- John Harris - drums

=== Production ===
- Cal Lampley - producer
- Rudy Van Gelder - engineer
