= Steve Davis (bassist) =

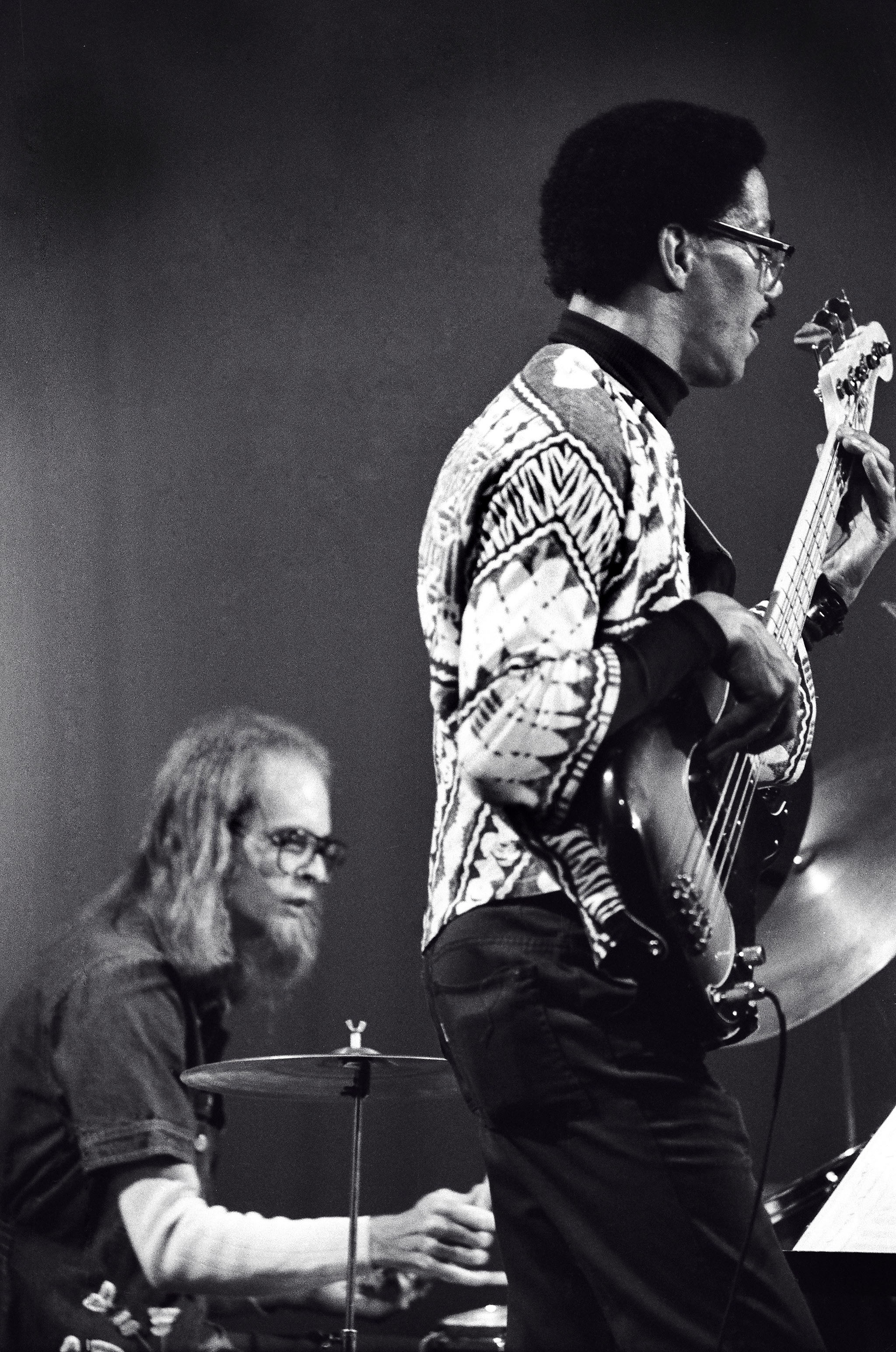
- Steve Davis on the right

Background information
- Also known as: Luquaman Abdul Syeed
- Born: March 14, 1929
- Died: August 21, 1987 (aged 58)
- Genres: Jazz, modal jazz, hard bop, post-bop
- Occupation: Musician
- Instruments: Double bass, bass guitar
- Formerly of: John Coltrane, McCoy Tyner

Steve Davis (March 14, 1929 – August 21, 1987) (also known by his Muslim name Luquaman Abdul Syeed) was an American jazz bassist best known for his time in the John Coltrane Quartet.

From 1960 to 1961, Davis was briefly part of the John Coltrane Quartet before being temporarily replaced by Reggie Workman and permanently replaced by Jimmy Garrison. Davis recorded My Favorite Things (1961) with the quartet.

He also recorded as a sideman with Chuck and Gap Mangione on Hey Baby! (1961), and with quartet fellow (and brother-in-law) McCoy Tyner on the 1963 album Nights of Ballads & Blues.

== Discography ==
With John Coltrane

- My Favorite Things (Atlantic, 1961)
- Coltrane Jazz (Atlantic, 1961)
- Coltrane Plays the Blues (Atlantic, 1962)
- Coltrane's Sound (Atlantic, 1964)

With Kenny Dorham

- The Flamboyan, Queens, NY, 1963 (Uptown, 2009)

With Eddie Jefferson

- Body and Soul (Prestige, 1968)

With Freddie McCoy

- Spider Man (Prestige, 1965)
- Peas 'n' Rice (Prestige, 1967)

With James Moody

- Cookin' the Blues (Argo, 1961)

With The Jazz Brothers Featuring Gap Mangione and Chuck Mangione

- Hey Baby! (Riverside, 1961)

With McCoy Tyner

- Nights of Ballads & Blues (Impulse, 1963)
