= Soul Flowers =

Studio album by Johnny "Hammond" Smith
- Released: 1968
- Recorded: September 27, 1967
- Studio: Van Gelder Studio, Englewood Cliffs, NJ
- Genre: Jazz
- Length: 35:00
- Label: Prestige; PR 7549
- Producer: Cal Lampley

Johnny "Hammond" Smith chronology
Gettin' Up (1967)	Soul Flowers (1968)	Dirty Grape (1968)

Soul Flowers is an album by jazz organist Johnny "Hammond" Smith recorded for the Prestige label in 1967.

== Reception ==
Professional ratings
Review scores
Source	Rating
Allmusic	3/5 stars

The Allmusic site awarded the album 3 stars stating "When a soul-jazz artist decides to devote the bulk of his album to pop standards and themes from the movies, stage, and TV, he better make damn sure that he interprets them in an inventive fashion. Fortunately, that's what Smith manages to do on this 1967 session".

== Track listing ==
All compositions by Johnny "Hammond" Smith except where noted

1. "N.Y.P.D." (Charles Gross) - 3:30
2. "Dirty Apple" - 5:00
3. "Days of Wine and Roses" (Henry Mancini, Johnny Mercer) - 3:20
4. "Ode to Billie Joe" (Bobbie Gentry) - 3:15
5. "You'll Never Walk Alone" (Oscar Hammerstein II, Richard Rodgers) - 3:10
6. "Alfie" (Burt Bacharach, Hal David) - 3:05
7. "Tara's Theme" (Max Steiner) - 3:35
8. "Here's That Rainy Day" (Johnny Burke, Jimmy Van Heusen) - 4:45
9. "I Got a Woman" (Ray Charles, Renald Richard) - 5:20

== Personnel ==
- Johnny "Hammond" Smith - organ
- Earl Edwards, Houston Person - tenor saxophone
- Wally Richardson - guitar
- Jimmy Lewis - electric bass
- John Harris - drums
- Richie "Pablo" Landrum - congas

=== Production ===
- Cal Lampley - producer
- Rudy Van Gelder - engineer
