= The Stinger Meets the Golden Thrush =

Studio album by Johnny "Hammond" Smith with Byrdie Green
- Released: 1966
- Recorded: January 4, 1966
- Studio: Van Gelder Studio, Englewood Cliffs, NJ
- Genre: Jazz
- Length: 35:56
- Label: Prestige; PR 7464
- Producer: Cal Lampley

Johnny "Hammond" Smith chronology
| The Stinger (1965) | The Stinger Meets the Golden Thrush (1966) | Love Potion #9 (1966) |

The Stinger Meets the Golden Thrush is an album by jazz organist Johnny "Hammond" Smith with vocalist Byrdie Green recorded for the Prestige label in 1966.

== Reception ==
Professional ratings
Review scores
| Source | Rating |
|---|---|
| Allmusic | 3/5 stars |

The Allmusic site awarded the album 3 stars.

== Track listing ==
All compositions by Johnny "Hammond" Smith except as indicated

1. "The Golden Thrush" – 3:20
2. "They Call It Stormy Monday" (T-Bone Walker) – 4:37
3. "Broadway" (Billy Byrd, Teddy McRae, Henri Woode) – 5:24
4. "On a Clear Day" (Alan Jay Lerner, Burton Lane) – 4:23
5. "Oriole" – 3:55
6. "If I Ruled the World" (Leslie Bricusse, Cyril Ornadel) – 3:22
7. "Blue Jay" – 5:20
8. "How I Lost My Love" (Hank Snow) – 5:35

== Personnel ==
- Johnny "Hammond" Smith – organ
- Byrdie Green – vocals (tracks 2 & 6)
- Otis Sutton – alto saxophone
- Houston Person – tenor saxophone
- Eddie McFadden – guitar
- Leo Stevens – drums

=== Production ===
- Cal Lampley – producer
- Rudy Van Gelder – engineer
