= Soul Yogi =

Studio album by Freddie McCoy
- Released: 1968
- Recorded: January 24 and February 5, 1968
- Studio: Van Gelder Studio, Englewood Cliffs, New Jersey
- Genre: Jazz
- Length: 37:35
- Label: Prestige; PR 7561
- Producer: Cal Lampley

Freddie McCoy chronology
Beans & Greens (1967)	Soul Yogi (1968)	Listen Here (1968)

Soul Yogi is the sixth album by American jazz vibraphonist Freddie McCoy which was recorded in 1968 for the Prestige label.

== Reception ==
Professional ratings
Review scores
Source	Rating
Allmusic	2/5 stars

Allmusic rated the album 2 stars.

== Track listing ==
All compositions by Freddie McCoy except where noted.

1. "Soul Yogi" – 3:35
2. "Salem Soul Song" – 5:30
3. "Sorry 'Bout That 3:40
4. "I Am the Walrus" (John Lennon, Paul McCartney) – 3:35
5. "Pet Sounds" (Brian Wilson) – 2:30
6. "What Now My Love" (Gilbert Bécaud, Pierre Delanoë, Carl Sigman) – 4:50
7. "Mysterioso" (Thelonious Monk) – 5:30
8. "Ride On" – 3:25
9. "Autumn Leaves" (Joseph Kosma, Jacques Prévert, Johnny Mercer) – 5:00
- Recorded at Van Gelder Studio in Englewood Cliffs, New Jersey on January 24 (tracks 2–5 & 8) and February 5 (tracks 1, 6, 7 & 9)

== Personnel ==
- Freddie McCoy – vibraphone, drums
- JoAnne Brackeen – piano, organ
- Steve Wolfe – sitar (tracks 2–5 & 8)
- Wally Richardson – guitar (tracks 2–5 & 8)
- Lawrence Evans – electric bass
- Ray Appleton – drums
- Dave Blume – arranger, conductor
- Peter Dimitriades, Emanuel Green, Joseph Malignaggi – violin (tracks 1–5 & 8)
