= Spider Man (album) =

Studio album by Freddie McCoy
- Released: 1965
- Recorded: October 6, 1965
- Studio: Van Gelder Studio, Englewood Cliffs, New Jersey
- Genre: Jazz
- Length: 30:00
- Label: Prestige; PR 7444
- Producer: Cal Lampley

Freddie McCoy chronology
Lonely Avenue (1965)	Spider Man (1965)	Funk Drops (1966)

Spider Man is the second album by American jazz vibraphonist Freddie McCoy which was recorded in 1965 for the Prestige label.

== Reception ==
Professional ratings
Review scores
Source	Rating
Allmusic	2/5 stars

Allmusic rated the album 2 stars.

== Track listing ==
All compositions by Freddie McCoy except where noted.

1. "Hav' Mercy" – 3:10
2. "Yesterdays" (Jerome Kern, Otto Harbach) – 7:20
3. "The Girl from Ipanema" (Antônio Carlos Jobim, Vinicius de Moraes, Norman Gimbel) – 4:35
4. "Spider Man" – 3:20
5. "That's All" (Alan Brandt Bob Haymes) – 7:25
6. "Speak Out, Deagan!" – 4:10

== Personnel ==
- Freddie McCoy – vibraphone
- Charles L. Wilson – piano
- Steve Davis – bass
- Rudy Lawless – drums
