= Love potion (disambiguation) =

Love potion may refer to:

- Love potion, in mythology and fiction, a type of potion designed to create feelings of love
- Lappish Hag's Love Potion, an alcoholic drink
- The Love Potion, a 1903 painting by Evelyn De Morgan
- Aphrodisiac, a substance made with or containing ingredients that increase sexual desire
- "Love Potion" (song), by Alisa Mizuki, 2002

== See also ==
- Love Potion No. 9 (disambiguation)
- Date rape drug
