= Here It 'Tis =

Studio album by Johnny "Hammond" Smith
- Released: 1970
- Recorded: September 21, 1970
- Studio: Van Gelder Studio, Englewood Cliffs, NJ
- Genre: Jazz
- Length: 37:40
- Label: Prestige; PR 10002
- Producer: Bob Porter

Johnny "Hammond" Smith chronology
Black Feeling! (1969)	Here It 'Tis (1970)	What's Going On (1971)

Here It 'Tis is an album by jazz organist Johnny "Hammond" Smith recorded for the Prestige label in 1970.

== Reception ==
Professional ratings
Review scores
Source	Rating
Allmusic	4/5 stars

The Allmusic site awarded the album 4 stars.

== Track listing ==
All compositions by Johnny "Hammond" Smith and James Clark except where noted

1. "Here It 'Tis" – 4:40
2. "Stormy" (J. R. Cobb, Buddy Buie) – 4:00
3. "The Nubs" (Smith) – 9:40
4. "Gina D" – 7:05
5. "Danny Boy" (Frederic Weatherly) – 4:15
6. "You've Made Me So Very Happy" (Berry Gordy, Jr., Brenda Holloway, Patrice Holloway, Frank Wilson) 8:00

== Personnel ==
- Johnny "Hammond" Smith - organ
- Houston Person - tenor saxophone
- James Clark - guitar
- Jimmy Lewis - electric bass
- Bernard Purdie (tracks 1 & 3–5) Eddie Gee (tracks 2 & 6) - drums

=== Production ===
- Bob Porter - producer
- Rudy Van Gelder - engineer
