= Soul Talk (Johnny "Hammond" Smith album) =

Studio album by Johnny "Hammond" Smith
- Released: 1969
- Recorded: May 19, 1969
- Studio: Van Gelder Studio, Englewood Cliffs, NJ
- Genre: Jazz
- Length: 32:20
- Label: Prestige; PR 7681
- Producer: Bob Porter

Johnny "Hammond" Smith chronology
Nasty! (1968)	Soul Talk (1969)	Black Feeling! (1969)

Soul Talk is an album by American jazz organist Johnny "Hammond" Smith recorded for the Prestige label in 1969.

== Reception ==
Professional ratings
Review scores
Source	Rating
Allmusic	4.5/5 stars

The Allmusic site awarded the album 4½ stars, calling it "a solid, no-surprise set of soul-jazz".

== Track listing ==
All compositions by Johnny "Hammond" Smith except where noted

1. "Soul Talk" - 9:30
2. "All Soul" (Curtis Lewis) - 5:30
3. "Up to Date" - 7:50
4. "Purty Dirty" (Wally Richardson) - 6:05
5. "This Guy's in Love with You" (Burt Bacharach, Hal David) - 4:25

== Personnel ==
- Johnny "Hammond" Smith - organ
- Rusty Bryant - tenor saxophone, alto saxophone, varitone
- Wally Richardson - guitar
- Bob Bushnell - electric bass
- Bernard Purdie - drums

=== Production ===
- Bob Porter - producer
- Rudy Van Gelder - engineer
