= Open House! =

Studio album by Johnny "Hammond" Smith
- Released: 1963
- Recorded: 1963; New York City
- Genre: Jazz
- Label: Riverside; RLP 482
- Producer: Orrin Keepnews

Johnny "Hammond" Smith chronology
Mr. Wonderful (1963)	Open House! (1963)	A Little Taste (1963)

Open House! is an album by jazz organist Johnny "Hammond" Smith which was recorded in 1963 and released on the Riverside label.

== Reception ==
Professional ratings
Review scores
Source	Rating
Allmusic	3/5 stars

The Allmusic site awarded the album 3 stars calling it "accessible, gritty, emotionally direct jazz that you didn't have to be an intellectual to comprehend".

== Track listing ==
All compositions by Johnny "Hammond" Smith except as indicated

1. "Open House" - 4:38
2. "Cyra" - 5:27
3. "I Remember You" (Johnny Mercer, Victor Schertzinger) - 5:01
4. "Theme from Cleopatra" (Alex North) - 2:36
5. "Blues for De-De" - 7:00
6. "Why Was I Born?" (Oscar Hammerstein II, Jerome Kern) - 4:41
7. "I Love You" (Cole Porter) - 5:50

== Personnel ==
- Johnny "Hammond" Smith - organ
- Thad Jones - cornet, trumpet
- Seldon Powell — tenor saxophone, flute
- Eddie McFadden - guitar
- Leo Stevens (tracks 1–4, 6 & 7), Art Taylor (track 5) - drums
- Ray Barretto - congas (tracks 1–4, 6 & 7)
