= Gimme Some! =

Studio album by Freddie McCoy
- Released: 1971
- Recorded: 1971; New York City
- Genre: Jazz
- Length: 33:35
- Label: Cobblestone; CST 9004
- Producer: Dave Blume

Freddie McCoy chronology
Listen Here (1968)	Gimme Some! (1971)

Gimme Some! is the final album by vibraphonist Freddie McCoy recorded in 1971 and released on the Cobblestone label.

== Reception ==
Allmusic called the album "a circa-1971 jazz-funk session featuring some trippy electric piano work".

== Track listing ==
All compositions by Freddie McCoy except where noted.

1. "Oh Happy Day" (Edwin Hawkins) – 3:54
2. "Light My Fire" (The Doors) – 6:19
3. "Gimme Some!" – 2:46
4. "This Guy's in Love with You" (Burt Bacharach, Hal David) – 3:17
5. "Aquarius" (James Rado, Gerome Ragni, Galt MacDermot) – 3:32
6. "The Worst That Could Happen" (Jimmy Webb) – 3:16
7. "Hey Jude" (John Lennon, Paul McCartney) – 6:12
8. "Time for My Children" – 4:19

== Personnel ==
- Freddie McCoy – vibraphone
