= The Prophet (album) =

Studio album by Johnny Hammond
- Released: 1972
- Recorded: November 29 and 30, 1972
- Studio: Van Gelder Studio, Englewood Cliffs, NJ
- Genre: Jazz
- Length: 34:25
- Label: Kudu; KU-10
- Producer: Creed Taylor

Johnny "Hammond" Smith chronology
Wild Horses Rock Steady (1971)	The Prophet (1972)	Higher Ground (1973)

The Prophet is an album by jazz organist Johnny Hammond recorded for the Kudu label (a subsidiary of CTI Records) in 1972.

== Track listing ==
All compositions by Johnny "Hammond" Smith except where noted

1. "Prophet" (Alfred Ellis) – 7:35
2. "Tomorrow Belongs to the Children" (Bob Gundry) – 4:00
3. "Witchy Woman" (Bernie Leadon, Don Henley) – 5:00
4. "Thunder and Lightning" (Chi Coltrane) – 7:10
5. "Stand Behind Me" (Carole King) – 4:05
6. "Corner of the Sky" (Stephen Schwartz) – 6:35

== Personnel ==
- Johnny Hammond – organ
- John Eckert, Jon Faddis, Marvin Stamm – trumpet, flugelhorn
- Wayne Andre, Dick Griffin – trombone
- Tony Studd – bass trombone
- Jerry Dodgion, Maceo Parker – tenor saxophone
- Pepper Adams, Cecil Payne – baritone saxophone
- Eric Gale – guitar
- Ron Carter – bass
- Billy Cobham – drums
- Airto Moreira – percussion
- Andrew Primus – steel drum
- Pee Wee Ellis – arranger, conductor, electric piano, melodica
- Carl Carldwell, Lani Groves, Tasha Thomas – vocals (tracks 3 & 6)
- Buddy Lucas – harmonica (track 3)
- Hubert Laws – flute (track 5)

=== Production ===
- Creed Taylor – producer
- Rudy Van Gelder – engineer
