= Love Potion No. 9 =

Love Potion No. 9 may refer to:

- "Love Potion No. 9" (song), a 1959 Leiber & Stoller song first released by the Clovers
- Love Potion #9 (album), a 1967 album by jazz organist Johnny "Hammond" Smith featuring a version of the above song
- Love Potion No. 9 (film), a 1992 movie starring Tate Donovan and Sandra Bullock
