= Gears (album) =

Studio album by Johnny Hammond
- Released: 1975
- Recorded: July 1975 at Fantasy Studios, Berkeley, California
- Genre: Jazz-funk
- Length: 33:19
- Label: Milestone
- Producer: Larry and Fonce Mizell

Johnny Hammond chronology
Gambler's Life (1974)	Gears (1975)	Forever Taurus (1976)

Professional ratings
Review scores
Source	Rating
Allmusic	4/5 stars

Gears is an album by jazz keyboardist Johnny Hammond. It was released in 1975 and produced by Larry and Fonce Mizell.

== Track listing ==
1. Tell Me What to Do 5:16
2. Los Conquistadores Chocolates 5:56
3. Lost on 23rd Street 6:36
4. Fantasy 6:06
5. Shifting Gears 5:19
6. Can't We Smile 4:35

== Personnel ==
- Johnny "Hammond" Smith - Organ, Synthesizer, Electric Piano
- Larry Mizell - Keyboards (Solina), Backing Vocals
- Fonce Mizell - Clarinet, Backing Vocals
- Jerry Peters - Electric Piano, Piano
- Harvey Mason - Drums
- Chuck Rainey - Electric Bass
- Craig McMullen, John Rowin - Guitar
- Roger Glenn - Flute, Vibraphone
- Kenneth Nash - Cymbal, Gong, Percussion
- Hadley Caliman - Tenor Saxophone
- Julian Priester - Trombone
- Michael White - Violin

== Charts ==
Chart (1975)	Peak position
Billboard Top Jazz Albums	31

== Samples ==
Several tracks have either sampled or taken inspiration from tracks on the album, most notably "Los Conquistadores Chocolates". A track titled "When You Gonna Learn" by UK group Jamiroquai, led by founding member Jay Kay, has chord progressions that bear a striking resemblance to the original chord progressions of a Smith's track "Los Conquistadores Chocolates". However, this was not by accident, as the booklet of the Acid Jazz Records release of the single bears a "special thanks" note to Smith, who gave permission to Jay Kay to use the composition's structure.
