= What's Going On (Johnny "Hammond" Smith album) =

Studio album by Johnny "Hammond" Smith
- Released: 1971
- Recorded: April 12 and July, 1971
- Studio: Van Gelder Studio, Englewood Cliffs, NJ
- Genre: Jazz
- Length: 37:32
- Label: Prestige; PR 10015
- Producer: Bob Porter

Johnny "Hammond" Smith chronology
| Here It 'Tis (1970) | What's Going On (1971) | Breakout (1971) |

What's Going On is an album by jazz organist Johnny "Hammond" Smith recorded for the Prestige label in 1971.

== Reception ==
Professional ratings
Review scores
| Source | Rating |
|---|---|
| Allmusic | 3/5 stars |

The Allmusic site awarded the album 3 stars.

== Track listing ==
All compositions by Johnny "Hammond" Smith except where noted

1. "What's Going On" (Renaldo Benson Al Cleveland, Marvin Gaye) - 9:45
2. "Smokin' Cool" - 6:53
3. "L and J" (James Clark) - 5:45
4. "I'll Be There" (Hal Davis, Willie Hutch, Berry Gordy, Bob West) - 5:20
5. "Between the Sheets" - 9:49

== Personnel ==
- Johnny "Hammond" Smith - organ
- Robert Prado, Ernie Royal - trumpet (tracks 1, 3 & 4)
- Garnett Brown - trombone (tracks 1, 3 & 4)
- Grover Washington Jr. - tenor saxophone
- Richard Landry - tenor saxophone (tracks 1, 3 & 4)
- Babe Clarke - baritone saxophone (tracks 1, 3 & 4)
- James Clark (tracks 1-3 & 5), Ted Dunbar (track 4) - guitar
- Jimmy Lewis - electric bass
- Eddie Gee - drums
- Unnamed string section (tracks 1, 3 & 4)
- Bill Fischer - arranger (tracks 1, 3 & 4)

=== Production ===
- Bob Porter - producer
- Rudy Van Gelder - engineer
