= A Little Taste =

Studio album by Johnny "Hammond" Smith
- Released: 1963
- Recorded: 1963; New York City
- Genre: Jazz
- Label: Riverside; RLP 496
- Producer: Orrin Keepnews

Johnny "Hammond" Smith chronology
| Open House! (1963) | A Little Taste (1963) | The Stinger (1964) |

A Little Taste is an album by jazz organist Johnny "Hammond" Smith which was recorded in 1963 and released on the Riverside label.

== Reception ==
Professional ratings
Review scores
| Source | Rating |
|---|---|
| Allmusic | 3/5 stars |

The Allmusic site awarded the album 3 stars and its review by Richie Unterberger calls it "a sturdy quartet date... There's more of a straight jazz (as opposed to soul-jazz) influence on this than on some other Smith sessions of the time".

== Track listing ==
All compositions by Johnny "Hammond" Smith except as indicated

1. "Nica's Dream" (Horace Silver) - 5:28
2. "Cleopatra and the African Knight" - 6:23
3. "Bennie's Diggin'" - 4:24
4. "Brake Through" - 4:35
5. "Eloise" - 3:54
6. "A Little Taste" (Cannonball Adderley) - 4:33
7. "Twixt the Sheets" - 4:12

== Personnel ==
- Johnny "Hammond" Smith - organ
- Virgil Jones - trumpet
- Houston Person — tenor saxophone
- Luis Taylor - drums
