= Black Coffee (Johnny "Hammond" Smith album) =

Live album by Johnny "Hammond" Smith
- Released: 1963
- Recorded: November 8, 1962; The Monterey Club, New Haven, Connecticut
- Genre: Jazz
- Label: Riverside; RLP 442

Johnny "Hammond" Smith chronology
Look Out! (1962)	Black Coffee (1963)	Mr. Wonderful (1963)

Black Coffee is a live album by jazz organist Johnny "Hammond" Smith which was recorded at the former Monterey Club located at 267 Dixwell Avenue in New Haven, Connecticut on November 8, 1962, and released on the Riverside label. Smith was a resident of New Haven at the time and wrote the second track, "Monterey Theme" specifically for the club where he frequently performed.

== Reception ==
Professional ratings
Review scores
Source	Rating
Allmusic	4.5/5 stars

In his review for Allmusic, Scott Yanow states "Although influenced by Jimmy Smith, this particular organist was also a strong grooving player, able to play both blues and more complicated chord changes... Johnny "Hammond" Smith is heard at his best throughout".

== Track listing ==
All compositions by Johnny "Hammond" Smith except as indicated

1. "Black Coffee" (Sonny Burke, Paul Francis Webster) - 4:19
2. "Monterey Theme" - 3:03
3. "I Remember Clifford" (Benny Golson) - 4:15
4. "Far Away Places" (Alex Kramer, Joan Whitney) - 7:14
5. "Rufus Toofus" - 7:06
6. "Body and Soul" (Frank Eyton, Johnny Green, Edward Heyman, Robert Sour) - 6:20
7. "He's a Real Gone Guy" (Nellie Lutcher) - 5:38

== Personnel ==
- Johnny "Hammond" Smith - Hammond B3 organ
- Seldon Powell - tenor saxophone (tracks 1, 3 & 5–7)
- Eddie McFadden - guitar
- Leo Stevens - drums
