= Breakout (Johnny Hammond album) =

Studio album by Johnny Hammond
- Released: 1971
- Recorded: June 3 and 4, 1971
- Studio: Van Gelder Studio, Englewood Cliffs, NJ
- Genre: Jazz
- Length: 34:25
- Label: Kudu; KU-01
- Producer: Creed Taylor

Johnny "Hammond" Smith chronology
What's Going On (1971)	Breakout (1971)	Wild Horses Rock Steady (1971)

Breakout is an album by jazz organist Johnny Hammond recorded for the Kudu label in 1971. The album was the first release on Creed Taylor's Kudu label, a subsidiary of CTI Records. Hammond had previously recorded as Johnny "Hammond" Smith; this was the first album for which he dropped his surname.

== Reception ==
Professional ratings
Review scores
Source	Rating
Allmusic	4/5 stars

The Allmusic site awarded the album 4 stars calling it "a blessed-out basket of blues and groove that covers some of the hot tunes of the day and some organ classics with enough soul power to melt the ice around the heart of even the staunchest jazz purist" and stating "This is a smoking album that runs the gamut of soul-jazz to hard funk and R&B seamlessly, but sweatily".

== Track listing ==
All compositions by Johnny "Hammond" Smith except where noted

1. "It's Too Late" (Carole King, Toni Stern) - 10:50
2. "Workin' On a Groovy Thing" (Roger Atkins, Neil Sedaka) - 6:35
3. "Never Can Say Goodbye" (Clifton Davis) - 5:35
4. "Blues Selah" (Leo Johnson) - 6:40
5. "Breakout" - 4:45

== Personnel ==
- Johnny Hammond - organ, arranger
- Danny Moore - trumpet
- Grover Washington, Jr. - tenor saxophone, arranger
- Hank Crawford - alto saxophone
- Eric Gale - guitar
- Johnny Williams - electric bass
- Billy Cobham - drums
- Airto Moreira - percussion
- Leo Johnson - arranger (track 4)

=== Production ===
- Creed Taylor - producer
- Rudy Van Gelder - engineer
