= Stimulation (album) =

Studio album by Johnny "Hammond" Smith
- Released: 1961
- Recorded: February 14 and May 12, 1961
- Studio: Van Gelder Studio, Englewood Cliffs
- Genre: Jazz
- Label: Prestige; PR 7203
- Producer: Esmond Edwards

Johnny "Hammond" Smith chronology
Gettin' the Message (1960)	Stimulation (1961)	Opus De Funk (1961)

Professional ratings
Review scores
Source	Rating
AllMusic	3/5 stars

Stimulation is an album by jazz organist Johnny "Hammond" Smith recorded for the Prestige label in 1961.

== Track listing ==
All compositions by Johnny "Hammond" Smith except where noted.

1. "Sticks and Stones" (Titus Turner) – 4:32
2. "Because You Left Me" – 5:29
3. "Ribs an' Chips" – 8:00
4. "Cry Me a River" (Arthur Hamilton) – 4:41
5. "Que Pasa?" – 3:53
6. "Invitation" (Bronisław Kaper) – 3:06
7. "Spring Is Here" (Lorenz Hart, Richard Rodgers) – 4:18
8. "Stimulation" – 2:56
- Recorded at Van Gelder Studio in Englewood Cliffs, New Jersey on February 14 (tracks 3, 4, 6 & 7) and May 12 (tracks 1, 2, 5 & 8), 1961.

== Personnel ==
- Johnny "Hammond" Smith – organ
- Freddie McCoy – vibraphone
- Eddie McFadden – guitar
- Wendell Marshall – bass
- Leo Stevens – drums
- Esmond Edwards – producer
- Rudy Van Gelder – engineer
