= Thunderbird (Willis Jackson album) =

Studio album by Willis Jackson
- Released: 1962
- Recorded: March 31, 1962
- Studio: Van Gelder Studio, Englewood Cliffs, New Jersey
- Genre: Jazz
- Label: Prestige; PRLP 7232
- Producer: Esmond Edwards

Willis Jackson chronology
Together Again, Again (1959–61)	Thunderbird (1962)	Johnny "Hammond" Cooks with Gator Tail (1962)

Thunderbird is an album by saxophonist Willis Jackson which was recorded in 1962 and released on the Prestige label.

== Reception ==
Professional ratings
Review scores
Source	Rating
Allmusic	4.5/5 stars

Allmusic awarded the album 4½ stars stating "Right from the title track opener, it's apparent that Jackson's heading straight for basic soul-jazz".

== Track listing ==
1. "Thunderbird" (Willis Jackson) – 5:06
2. "Oh, Lady Be Good" (George Gershwin, Ira Gershwin) – 5:28
3. "Back and Forth" (Jackson, Bill Jennings) – 9:16
4. "California Sun" (Henry Glover, Morris Levy) – 3:53
5. "Body and Soul" (Frank Eyton, Johnny Green, Edward Heyman, Robert Sour) – 7:55
6. "A Penny Serenade" (Darren Halifax, Melle Weersma) – 7:44

== Personnel ==
- Willis Jackson – tenor saxophone
- Freddie Roach – organ
- Bill Jennings – guitar
- Wendell Marshall – bass
- Frank Shea – drums
- Ray Barretto – congas
