= Nights of Ballads & Blues =

Studio album by McCoy Tyner
- Released: Early July 1963
- Recorded: March 4, 1963
- Studio: Van Gelder Studio, Englewood Cliffs, NJ
- Genre: Jazz
- Length: 38:48
- Label: Impulse! A-39
- Producer: Bob Thiele

McCoy Tyner chronology
Reaching Fourth (1962)	Nights of Ballads & Blues (1963)	Live at Newport (1964)

Nights of Ballads & Blues is the third album by the jazz pianist McCoy Tyner, released on the Impulse! label in 1963. It features performances by Tyner with Steve Davis on bass and Lex Humphries on drums.

== Reception ==
Professional ratings
Review scores
Source	Rating
AllMusic	4/5 stars
DownBeat	3.5/5 stars
The Penguin Guide to Jazz Recordings	3/4 stars
The Rolling Stone Jazz Record Guide	3/5 stars

The jazz critic Harvey Pekar said in his August 29, 1963, review for DownBeat, "Tyner's playing has many virtues, but one in particular is his tastefulness. There is nothing trivial about his music; he is, to quote an often used phrase, a 'musician's musician.'" The AllMusic review by Stephen Cook states that the album "qualifies as one of the pianist's most enjoyable early discs".

Reviewing the album in 2017, Marc Myers of JazzWax said: "For some strange reason, in late 1962 and the first half of 1963, Tyner was asked by producer Bob Thiele to record more straightforward jazz albums as a leader... Tyner's playing is exciting and exceptional on all of the tracks... On the album, he exhibits a reserved elegance and tenderness that reveals the other side of his personality—a lover of melody and standards. In this regard, there are traces of Oscar Peterson in his playing. Perhaps Thiele was using Tyner to take a bite out of Peterson's vast and successful early-'60s share of the jazz market."

== Track listing ==
"'Round Midnight"
30 seconds of "Round Midnight"

1. "Satin Doll" (Ellington, Mercer, Strayhorn) - 5:40
2. "We'll Be Together Again" (Fischer, Laine) - 3:40
3. "'Round Midnight" (Monk) - 6:23
4. "For Heaven's Sake" (Elise Bretton, Edwards, Donald Meyer) - 3:48
5. "Star Eyes" (De Paul, Raye) - 5:03
6. "Blue Monk" (Monk) - 5:22
7. "Groove Waltz" (Tyner) - 5:31
8. "Days of Wine and Roses" (Mancini, Mercer) - 3:21

== Personnel ==
- McCoy Tyner - piano
- Steve Davis - double bass
- Lex Humphries - drums
