= Higher Ground (Johnny Hammond album) =

Studio album by Johnny Hammond
- Released: 1974
- Recorded: October 31 and November 1, 1973
- Studio: Van Gelder Studio, Englewood Cliffs, NJ
- Genre: Jazz fusion, jazz-funk
- Length: 35:56
- Label: Kudu; KU-16
- Producer: Creed Taylor

Johnny Hammond chronology
The Prophet (1972)	Higher Ground (1974)	Gambler's Life (1974)

Higher Ground is an album by jazz organist Johnny Hammond recorded for the Kudu label in 1973.

== Reception ==
Professional ratings
Review scores
Source	Rating
Allmusic	2/5 stars

The Allmusic site awarded the album 2 stars stating "Some of the arrangements seem, well... arranged, but as soon as Smith kicks in, the groove is established".

The song "Big Sur Suite" has been sampled multiple times including The Beastie Boys "Pass the Mic" and Dr. Dre in "A Nigga Wit a Gun".

== Track listing ==
1. "Catch My Soul" (Jack Good, Tony Joe White) - 7:19
2. "Summertime/The Ghetto" (George Gershwin, Ira Gershwin, DuBose Heyward/Donny Hathaway, Leroy Hutson) - 10:06
3. "Higher Ground" (Stevie Wonder) - 10:33
4. "Big Sur Suite" (Johnny "Hammond" Smith) - 9:04

== Personnel ==
- Johnny Hammond - organ, electric piano
- Wayne Andre, Tony Studd - trombone
- Paul Faulise, Alan Raph - bass trombone
- Jon Faddis, John Frosk, Alan Rubin - trumpet
- Marvin Stamm - trumpet, flugelhorn
- Ray Alonge - French horn
- Joe Henderson - tenor saxophone
- Hank Crawford - alto saxophone (track 4)
- Eddie Daniels - clarinet
- Romeo Penque - alto flute, oboe
- Eli Carmen - bassoon
- Bob James - electric piano, organ, mellotron, arranger, conductor
- George Benson - guitar (tracks 2–4)
- Ron Carter - bass, electric bass
- Jack DeJohnette (track 4), Steve Gadd (tracks 1–3) - drums
- Phil Kraus, Ralph MacDonald - percussion

=== Production ===
- Creed Taylor - producer
- Rudy Van Gelder - engineer
