= Wild Horses Rock Steady =

Studio album by Johnny Hammond
- Released: 1972
- Recorded: October and November 1971
- Studio: Van Gelder Studio, Englewood Cliffs, NJ
- Genre: Jazz
- Length: 38:12
- Label: Kudu; KU-04
- Producer: Creed Taylor

Johnny Hammond chronology
Breakout (1971)	Wild Horses Rock Steady (1972)	The Prophet (1972)

Wild Horses Rock Steady is an album by jazz organist Johnny Hammond recorded for the Kudu label (a subsidiary of CTI Records) in 1971.

== Reception ==
Professional ratings
Review scores
Source	Rating
Allmusic	3.5/5 stars

The Allmusic site awarded the album 3½ stars stating "Johnny Hammond's 1972 soul-jazz beauty is another stunning example of great creativity at Creed Taylor's Kudu label through the mid-'70s".

== Track listing ==
1. "Rock Steady" (Aretha Franklin) – 6:48
2. "Who Is Sylvia?" (Galt MacDermot) – 7:25
3. "Peace Train" (Cat Stevens) – 4:31
4. "I Don't Know How to Love Him" (Tim Rice, Andrew Lloyd Webber) – 7:35
5. "It's Impossible" (Armando Manzanero, Sid Wayne) – 5:27
6. "Wild Horses" (Mick Jagger, Keith Richards) – 6:26

== Personnel ==
- Johnny Hammond - organ, electric piano
- Al DeRisi, Snooky Young - trumpet, flugelhorn (tracks 3, 4 & 6)
- Wayne Andre - trombone (tracks 4 & 6)
- Grover Washington, Jr. - tenor saxophone, alto saxophone (tracks 1–3, 5 & 6)
- Harold Vick - tenor saxophone (tracks 3 & 6)
- Pepper Adams - baritone saxophone (tracks 3, 4 & 6)
- George Benson (tracks 4 & 5), Eric Gale (tracks 1, 2 & 6), Bob Mann (tracks 3, 4 & 6), Melvin Sparks (tracks 1, 4 & 6) - guitar
- Ron Carter - double bass, electric bass
- Billy Cobham (tracks 2–6), Bernard Purdie (track 1) - drums
- Omar Clay (tracks 1 & 2), Airto Moreira (tracks 1, 2 & 4–6) - percussion
- Julius Brand, Paul Gershman, Emanuel Green, Julius Held, Harry Katzman, Joe Malin, Gene Orloff, Max Polikoff - violin (tracks 1, 2, 4 & 5)
- Bob James - arranger, conductor

=== Production ===
- Creed Taylor – producer
- Rudy Van Gelder – engineer
