= Gettin' the Message =

Studio album by Johnny "Hammond" Smith
- Released: 1961
- Recorded: October 14, 1960
- Studio: Van Gelder Studio, Englewood Cliffs
- Genre: Jazz
- Label: Prestige; PR 7217
- Producer: Esmond Edwards

Johnny "Hammond" Smith chronology
Talk That Talk (1960)	Gettin' the Message (1961)	Stimulation (1961)

Gettin' the Message is an album by jazz organist Johnny "Hammond" Smith recorded for the Prestige label in 1960.

== Reception ==
Professional ratings
Review scores
Source	Rating
AllMusic	3/5 stars

AllMusic awarded the album 3 stars stating "this is a solidly entertaining and texturally intriguing album".

== Track listing ==
All compositions by Johnny "Hammond" Smith except where noted.

1. "Swanee River" (Traditional) – 8:57
2. "Just Say So Long" – 4:03
3. "Lid Flippin'" – 5:17
4. "Gettin' the Message" – 7:15
5. "Princess" – 5:30
6. "Dementia" – 5:18

== Personnel ==
- Johnny "Hammond" Smith – organ
- Lem Winchester – vibraphone
- Eddie McFadden – guitar
- Wendell Marshall – bass
- Bill Erskine – drums
- Esmond Edwards – producer
- Rudy Van Gelder – engineer
