= Johnny "Hammond" Smith =

American jazz organist (1933–1997)

- Smith in the 1970s

Background information
- Also known as: Johnny Hammond
- Born: John Robert Smith; December 16, 1933; Louisville, Kentucky, U.S.
- Died: June 4, 1997 (aged 63) Victorville, California, U.S.
- Genres: Hard bop; soul jazz
- Occupation: Musician
- Instrument: Organ

John Robert "Johnny Hammond" Smith (December 16, 1933 – June 4, 1997) was an American soul jazz and hard bop organist. Born in Louisville, Kentucky, he was a renowned player of the Hammond B-3 organ so earning "Hammond" as a nickname, which also avoided his being confused with jazz guitarist Johnny Smith, although this could sometimes lead to him being confused with Jimmy Smith, another Hammond great.

== Biography ==
Smith played with Paul Williams and Chris Columbo before forming his own group. His bands featured singers Etta Jones, Byrdie Green, saxophonists Houston Person, Earl Edwards, guitarists Eddie McFadden, Floyd Smith, James Clark, vibist Freddie McCoy. His career took off as he was serving as accompanist to singer Nancy Wilson. One of his last accomplishments also included Nancy Wilson. He wrote the song "Quiet Fire" for her Nancy Now! release in 1988.

After a 10-year spell on Prestige Records throughout the 1960s, resulting in a series of albums, he signed for soul/R&B influenced Kudu imprint of Creed Taylor's well-regarded CTI Records jazz record label in 1971. His first album for Taylor, Breakout, was chosen that year to launch Kudu. The album featured Grover Washington Jr. as a sideman prior to the launch of his career as a solo recording artist. Three further albums followed with Taylor on Kudu, as he decided to refer to himself as "Johnny Hammond" after deciding to drop "Smith" from his name.

His style had become increasingly funky as he adapted to the style changes in music, culminating in two popular albums with the Mizell Brothers, Gambler's Life (1974) for the CTI offshoot, Salvation, and then in 1975 with Gears after switching to another jazz label, Milestone Records. He began using electric and acoustic pianos, starting with Gambler's Life, in addition to his signature instrument. Hammond's song "Shifting Gears" was featured on the breakbeat compilation Ultimate Breaks and Beats, and was also featured in the soundtrack of the 2006 video game Driver: Parallel Lines as well. His song "Conquistadores Chocolates" was covered by BadBadNotGood and featured on The Cayo Perico Heist update for Grand Theft Auto Online by Rockstar Games.

Smith also taught at the Cal Poly Pomona music department for several years, beginning in January 1987.

He died in Victorville, California, of cancer at the age of 63.

== Discography ==
=== As leader ===
- Have You Heard (Arrow ALP-1200, 1958)
- Imagination (Warwick W-2003, 1959)
- All Soul (New Jazz NJ 8221, 1959)
- That Good Feelin' (New Jazz NJ 8229, 1959; reissued on BGP/Ace in 1993)
- Talk That Talk (New Jazz NJ 8241, 1960; reissued on BGP/Ace in 1993) -with Oliver Nelson
- Stimulation (Prestige PR 7203, 1961) -with Freddie McCoy
- Gettin' the Message (Prestige PR 7217, 1960) -with Lem Winchester
- Johnny "Hammond" Cooks with Gator Tail [also released as Good 'Nuff] (Prestige PR 7239, 1962) -with Willis Jackson
- Look Out! (New Jazz NJ 8288, 1962) -with Seldon Powell
- Black Coffee [live] (Riverside RS 9442, 1962) -with Seldon Powell
- Mr. Wonderful (Riverside RS 9466, 1963) -with Houston Person
- Open House! (Riverside RS 9482, 1963) -with Thad Jones, Seldon Powell
- A Little Taste (Riverside RS 9496, 1963) -with Virgil Jones, Houston Person
- The Stinger (Prestige PR 7408, 1965) -with Houston Person, Floyd Smith
- Opus De Funk (Prestige PR 7420, 1961 [rel. 1966]) -with Freddie McCoy
- The Stinger Meets the Golden Thrush (Prestige PR 7464, 1966) -with Byrdie Green
- Love Potion #9 (Prestige PR 7482, 1966) -with Virgil Jones
- Gettin' Up [also released as Ebb Tide] (Prestige PR 7494, 1967) -with Virgil Jones, Houston Person
- Soul Flowers (Prestige PR 7549, 1967) -with Houston Person
- Dirty Grape (Prestige PR 7564, 1968) -with Houston Person
- Nasty! (Prestige PR 7588, 1968) -with Houston Person, John Abercrombie, Grady Tate
- Soul Talk (Prestige PR 7681, 1969) -with Rusty Bryant, Bernard Purdie
- Black Feeling! (Prestige PR 7736, 1969) -with Virgil Jones, Rusty Bryant
- Here It 'Tis (Prestige PR 10002, 1970) -with Houston Person, Bernard Purdie
- What's Going On (Prestige PR 10015, 1971) -with Grover Washington Jr.
- Breakout (Kudu/CTI KU-01, 1971; reissued on Epic/Legacy in 2002)
- Wild Horses Rock Steady (Kudu/CTI KU-04, 1971; reissued on Sony Masterworks in 2011)
- The Prophet (Kudu/CTI KU-10, 1972)
- Higher Ground (Kudu/CTI KU-16, 1973; reissued on CBS Associated in 1987)
- Gambler's Life (Salvation/CTI SAL-702, 1974; reissued on Soul Brother [UK] Records in 2001)
- Gears (Milestone M-9062, 1975; reissued on BGP/Ace in 1992)
- Forever Taurus (Milestone M-9068, 1976; reissued on BGP/Ace in 1992)
- Storm Warning (Milestone M-9076, 1977)
- Don't Let The System Get You (Milestone M-9083, 1978)

=== LP/CD compilations ===
- The Best Of Johnny "Hammond" Smith (Prestige PR 7705, 1969)
- The Best Of Johnny "Hammond" Smith For Lovers (Prestige PR 7777, 1970)
- Talk That Talk (Prestige, 1995) (compilation of Talk That Talk + Gettin' The Message)
- That Good Feelin' (Prestige, 1996) (compilation of All Soul + That Good Feelin')
- Legends Of Acid Jazz: Johnny "Hammond" Smith (Prestige, 1996) (compilation of Soul Talk + Black Feeling!)
- Black Coffee (Milestone, 1997) (compilation of Black Coffee + Mr. Wonderful)
- Legends Of Acid Jazz: Johnny "Hammond" Smith - Soul Flowers (Prestige, 1999) (compilation of Soul Flowers + Dirty Grape)
- The Soulful Blues (Prestige, 2000) (compilation of Ebb Tide + Nasty!)
- Open House (Milestone, 2001) (compilation of Open House! + A Little Taste)
- Good 'Nuff (Prestige, 2003) (compilation of Cooks With Gator Tail + The Stinger)
- Opus De Funk (Prestige, 2004) (compilation of Stimulation + Opus De Funk)

=== As sideman ===
With Gene Ammons

- Velvet Soul (Prestige, 1960/1961/1962 [rel. 1964])
- Angel Eyes (Prestige, 1960/1962 [rel. 1965])

With Byrdie Green

- The Golden Thrush Strikes at Midnight (Prestige PR 7503, 1966)
- I Got It Bad (And That Ain't Good) (Prestige PR 7509, 1967)
- Sister Byrdie! (Prestige PR 7574, 1968)

With others

- Billy Butler, Night Life (Prestige, 1971)
- Chris Columbus, Jazz: Re-Discovering Old Favorites [also released as Summertime] (Strand, 1962)
- Oliver Nelson, Taking Care of Business (New Jazz, 1960)
- Sylvia Syms, For Once in My Life (Prestige, 1967)
