= Inception (McCoy Tyner album) =

Studio album by McCoy Tyner
- Released: June 1962
- Recorded: January 10–11, 1962
- Studio: Van Gelder Studio, Englewood Cliffs
- Genre: Jazz
- Length: 32:54
- Label: Impulse! A-18
- Producer: Bob Thiele

McCoy Tyner chronology
Inception (1962)	Reaching Fourth (1962)

Professional ratings
Review scores
Source	Rating
AllMusic	4/5 stars
Down Beat	3.5/5 stars
The Rolling Stone Jazz Record Guide	3/5 stars
The Penguin Guide to Jazz Recordings	3.5/4 stars

Inception is the debut album by jazz pianist McCoy Tyner which was released on the Impulse! label in 1962. It features performances by Tyner with bassist Art Davis and drummer Elvin Jones.

== Reception ==
The AllMusic review by Alexander Gelfand states that "this album gives listeners the chance to hear what a very young Tyner sounded like outside the confines of the classic John Coltrane quartet of the early '60s; it reveals a lyrical approach to jazz piano that seems a far cry from Tyner's mature style".

== Background ==
"Blues for Gwen" was named after Tyner's sister, whilst "Sunset" was suggested by Tyner's wife, Aisha, because the piece "brought to her mind an impression of nature, and because it's a reflective ballad, "Sunset" seemed the logical title."

== Track listing ==
All compositions by McCoy Tyner except as indicated

1. "Inception" - 4:28
2. "There Is No Greater Love" (Jones, Symes) - 6:21
3. "Blues for Gwen" - 4:27
4. "Sunset" - 4:41
5. "Effendi" - 6:39
6. "Speak Low" (Weill, Nash) - 6:18
- Recorded on January 10 (#1, 4–5) and January 11 (#2–3, 6), 1962.

== Personnel ==
- McCoy Tyner - piano
- Art Davis - bass
- Elvin Jones - drums
