= That Good Feelin' =

Studio album by Johnny "Hammond" Smith
- Released: 1959
- Recorded: November 4, 1959
- Studio: Van Gelder Studio, Englewood Cliffs
- Genre: Jazz
- Length: 34:26
- Label: New Jazz; NJ 8229
- Producer: Esmond Edwards

Johnny "Hammond" Smith chronology
| All Soul (1959) | That Good Feelin' (1959) | Talk That Talk (1960) |

That Good Feelin' is an album by jazz organist Johnny "Hammond" Smith recorded for the New Jazz label in 1959.

== Reception ==
Professional ratings
Review scores
| Source | Rating |
|---|---|
| AllMusic | 4/5 stars |

AllMusic awarded the album 4 stars stating "A standards-heavy set from 1959, Johnny "Hammond" Smith's That Good Feelin' is indicative of his early style".

== Track listing ==
All compositions by Johnny "Hammond" Smith except where noted.

1. "That Good Feelin'" – 5:36
2. "Bye Bye Blackbird" (Mort Dixon, Ray Henderson) – 4:29
3. "Autumn Leaves" (Joseph Kosma, Johnny Mercer, Jacques Prévert) – 4:25
4. "I'll Remember April" (Gene de Paul, Patricia Johnston, Don Raye) – 4:37
5. "Billie's Bounce" (Charlie Parker) – 5:32
6. "My Funny Valentine" (Lorenz Hart, Richard Rodgers) – 4:34
7. "Puddin'" – 5:13

== Personnel ==
- Johnny "Hammond" Smith – organ
- Thornel Schwartz – guitar
- George Tucker – bass
- Leo Stevens – drums

=== Production ===
- Esmond Edwards – producer
- Rudy Van Gelder – engineer
