= Byrdie Green =

- Green photographed in 1967.

Background information
- Birth name: Bertha Green
- Born: 1936; Detroit, Michigan
- Died: April 26, 2008; New York City
- Genres: jazz, R&B, soul, gospel
- Occupation(s): Singer-songwriter, record producer
- Labels: End Records, Hallmark Records, 20th Century Fox Records, Prestige Records

Byrdie Green (occasionally credited as Birdie Green) (1936 – April 26, 2008) was a jazz and R&B singer from Michigan.

== About ==
Byrdie Green was born in Detroit, Michigan in 1936. The daughter of a Baptist minister, she sang first in her father's church. Later she went to New York City and performed in clubs, and at one time was a protege of Ruth Brown. She was the first artist signed to Perri Records, who debuted with Green's single "Now is the Time For Love" b/w "Be Anything." She began recording with End Records and 20th Century Fox Records, cutting singles "How Come" b/w "Tremblin'" and "Get a Hold of Yourself" b/w "Don't Take Your Love From Me" in the early 1960s. The song "Get a Hold of Yourself" is a blend of blues and gospel, and Billboard calls it "a slew rockaballad" and "her strongest item." Green performed at many popular venues, including The Apollo, Baby Grand, The Cookery and Pier 52, as well as Rutgers University, in Boston and in Bermuda. Around 1965, she was hired by organist Johnny "Hammond" Smith and signed with Prestige Records. Smith's The Stinger Meets the Golden Thrush was released in 1966, with Green singing on "They Call It Stormy Monday" and "If I Ruled The World." Green was acclaimed as "an excellent blues singer", "with a powerfully persuasive voice".

That same year Green released her first solo full-length The Golden Thrush Strikes at Midnight, featuring Smith on organ on "Goin' Out of My Head," "The Shadow of Your Smile" and "Hurt So Bad." Billboard said Green is "a soul singer with a lot to say and who says it well with a touch of the blues, jazz and gospel." Another reviewer said, "Miss Green displays here a skill that enables her to revitalize not only hard-core blues numbers, but also tried pop items .... She sings with much feeling no matter what the tune, and ... she emotes with a conviction few modern blues interpreters have shown." She released two more albums, I Got It Bad (And That Ain't Good) in 1967, which featured Smith, Houston Person, Thornel Schwartz and Jimmy Lewis, and Sister Byrdie! in 1968, which one reviewer called a "gem of soul, blues, and gospel pinned down with Smith's patented organ grooves." Another described it as "slow and moody with some presentations and steppin' out and really telling you where it's at on the others ... always sounding so very groovy." The same year, she appeared on a Nipsey Russell TV show, and, at a performance in New York, was asked by Frank Sinatra to sing an extra set of songs. Her voice was likened to Dinah Washington.

=== Late career ===
Green took a break from her career to raise her two daughters, Deborah A. Murray and Dardenella Braxton. She recalls in a 1986 interview in The New York Times "it was necessary to stop, to give them guidance. I could always start my career up again." Green returned to perform at Carnegie Recital Hall in a show entitled Byrdie Green Sings the Blues on March 7, 1975, and continued to work on tour with The Thad Jones/Mel Lewis Orchestra. A 1977 live review by The New York Times John S. Wilson calls Green "a cool blues singer–crisp and curt, with a wry, ironic touch–and, in the blues, she projects a warmth and understanding." Another reviewer described her as having "strong, beautifully modulated voice" with "a command of dynamics which enables her to bathe a lyric in a running river of sound – soft, loud, gradations between." In the 1980s she sang at Lickety Split, Adam Clayton Powell Blvd, Sutton's and at Jimmy Weston's, sometimes accompanied by Walter Bishop Jr. In 1989 she was referred to by The New Yorker as the "little known singer Byrdie Green" as she was joined on stage by Max Roach, Jimmy Heath and Carl Coleman. She also toured with Broadway musical Black and Blue.

Green died from a chronic illness at St. Luke's Hospital on April 26, 2008, and was eulogized at Mt. Neboh Church in New York City on May 3, 2008.

=== Samples ===
The song "Return of the Prodigal Son" was sampled by Grand Puba for the 1992 track "Lickshot." It also enjoyed an underground DJ following that eventually led to a 45 reissue.

== Discography ==
=== Albums ===
- The Stinger Meets the Golden Thrush (Prestige, 1966) - this is a Johnny "Hammond" Smith album with Green as featured singer on 2 tracks
- The Golden Thrush Strikes at Midnight (Prestige, 1966) - with Johnny "Hammond" Smith, Eddie Diehl
- I Got It Bad (And That Ain't Good) (Prestige, 1967) - with Johnny "Hammond" Smith, Thornel Schwartz
- Sister Byrdie! (Prestige, 1968) - with Johnny "Hammond" Smith, Wally Richardson; includes "Return of the Prodigal Son"

=== Singles ===
- Now is the Time For Love // Be Anything (Perri, 1962)
- How Come // Tremblin' (End, 1962)
- Memories Are Made of This // Tremblin' (End, 1963)
- Get a Hold of Yourself // Don't Take Your Love from Me (20th Century Fox, 1963)
- I Found My Place // I Deserve It (20th Century Fox, 1964)
- Through a Long and Sleepless Night // I Deserve It (20th Century Fox, 1965)
- Goin' Out of My Head // In The Dark (Prestige, 1966)
- Don't Make it Hurt // Magic of Your Love (Hallmark, 1969)
- We Need Christmas Now More Than Any Other Year // We Need Christmas Now More Than Any Other Year (Monologue) (Penda Mungu, 1973)
