= Love Potion No. 9 (album) =

Album by Johnny "Hammond" Smith

Love Potion #9

Studio album by Johnny "Hammond" Smith
- Released: 1967
- Recorded: September 28, 1966
- Studio: Van Gelder Studio, Englewood Cliffs, NJ
- Genre: Jazz
- Length: 29:40
- Label: Prestige; PR 7482
- Producer: Cal Lampley

Johnny "Hammond" Smith chronology
The Stinger Meets the Golden Thrush (1966)	Love Potion #9 (1967)	Gettin' Up (1967)

Love Potion #9 is an album by jazz organist Johnny "Hammond" Smith recorded for the Prestige label in 1966.

== Reception ==
Professional ratings
Review scores
Source	Rating
Allmusic	3/5 stars

The Allmusic site awarded the album 3 stars stating "Since there is less than half-an-hour of music here and nothing unexpected occurs, this is just an average outing, although it should please jazz organ fans".

== Track listing ==
All compositions by Johnny "Hammond" Smith except where noted

1. "Love Potion #9" (Jerry Leiber, Mike Stoller) - 2:50
2. "A Taste of Honey" (Bobby Scott, Ric Marlow) - 3:20
3. "The Impossible Dream" (Mitch Leigh, Joe Darion) - 3:10
4. "Blues on Sunday" - 5:10
5. "Sunny" (Bobby Hebb) - 3:10
6. "The Shadow of Your Smile" (Johnny Mandel, Paul Francis Webster) - 3:40
7. "Kimberly's Delight" - 2:50
8. "Up Comes Monday" - 5:30

== Personnel ==
- Johnny "Hammond" Smith - organ
- Virgil Jones - trumpet
- Gene Walker - tenor saxophone
- Eddie Diehl - guitar
- John Harris - drums

=== Production ===
- Cal Lampley - producer
- Rudy Van Gelder - engineer
