= Talk That Talk (Johnny "Hammond" Smith album) =

Studio album by Johnny "Hammond" Smith
- Released: 1960
- Recorded: April 22, 1960
- Studio: Van Gelder Studio, Englewood Cliffs
- Genre: Jazz
- Label: New Jazz; NJ 8243
- Producer: Esmond Edwards

Johnny "Hammond" Smith chronology
That Good Feelin' (1959)	Talk That Talk (1960)	Gettin' the Message (1960)

Talk That Talk is an album by jazz organist Johnny "Hammond" Smith recorded for the New Jazz label in 1960.

== Reception ==
Professional ratings
Review scores
Source	Rating
AllMusic	4/5 stars

AllMusic awarded the album 4 stars stating "Smith's playing on this album is low-key almost to the point of being conservative, deeply soulful without resorting to what would soon become tired funk clichés".

== Track listing ==
All compositions by Johnny "Hammond" Smith except where noted.

1. "Talk That Talk" – 5:12
2. "An Affair to Remember" – 2:35
3. "The End of a Love Affair" (Edward Redding) – 5:22
4. "Minors Allowed" – 5:47
5. "Rip Tide" (Walter Donaldson, Gus Kahn) – 4:48
6. "Misty" (Johnny Burke, Erroll Garner) – 4:01
7. "Bennie's Diggin'" – 4:59
8. "A Portrait of Jennie" (Russell Robinson, Gordon Burdge) – 2:23
- Recorded at Van Gelder Studio in Englewood Cliffs, New Jersey on April 22, 1960

== Personnel ==
- Johnny "Hammond" Smith – organ
- Oliver Nelson – tenor saxophone (tracks 4, 5 & 7)
- George Tucker – bass
- Art Taylor – drums
- Ray Barretto – congas
- Esmond Edwards – producer
- Rudy Van Gelder – engineer
