= Reaching Fourth =

Studio album by McCoy Tyner Trio
- Released: February 1963
- Recorded: November 14, 1962
- Studio: Van Gelder Studio, Englewood Cliffs
- Genre: Jazz
- Length: 34:05
- Label: Impulse! A-33
- Producer: Bob Thiele

McCoy Tyner Trio chronology
Inception (1962)	Reaching Fourth (1963)	Nights of Ballads & Blues (1963)

Professional ratings
Review scores
Source	Rating
Allmusic	4.5/5 stars
The Rolling Stone Jazz Record Guide	4/5 stars

Reaching Fourth is the second album by jazz pianist McCoy Tyner which was released on the Impulse! label in 1963. It features performances by Tyner with bassist Henry Grimes and drummer Roy Haynes.

== Reception ==
The Allmusic review by Scott Yanow states that the album "although not as intense as his work with the John Coltrane Quartet, is generally memorable and still sounds quite viable 35 years later".

== Track listing ==
1. "Reaching Fourth" (Tyner) - 4:21
2. "Goodbye" (Jenkins) - 5:46
3. "Theme for Ernie" (Fred Lacey) - 6:00
4. "Blues Back" (Tyner) - 6:54
5. "Old Devil Moon" [From Finian's Rainbow] (Harburg, Lane) - 7:27
6. "Have You Met Miss Jones?" [From I'd Rather Be Right] (Hart, Rodgers) - 3:47

== Personnel ==
- McCoy Tyner - piano
- Henry Grimes - bass
- Roy Haynes - drums
