= Look Out! (Johnny "Hammond" Smith album) =

Studio album by Johnny "Hammond" Smith with Seldon Powell
- Released: 1962
- Recorded: January 22, 1962
- Studio: Van Gelder Studio, Englewood Cliffs, NJ
- Genre: Jazz
- Length: 37:17
- Label: New Jazz; NJ 8288
- Producer: Esmond Edwards

Johnny "Hammond" Smith chronology
Johnny "Hammond" Cooks with Gator Tail (1962)	Look Out! (1962)	Black Coffee (1962)

Look Out! is an album by jazz organist Johnny "Hammond" Smith, with saxophonist Seldon Powell, recorded for the New Jazz label in 1962.

== Reception ==
Professional ratings
Review scores
Source	Rating
Allmusic	3/5 stars

Allmusic awarded the album 3 stars.

== Track listing ==
All compositions by Johnny "Hammond" Smith except where noted

1. "Upset" – 3:32
2. "Soul Grits" – 5:51
3. "There'll Never Be a Love" – 7:25
4. "Let Everybody Say Amen" – 5:03
5. "Clemente" – 5:37
6. "I'm Glad There Is You" (Jimmy Dorsey, Paul Mertz) – 4:18
7. "Que Sera Baby" – 3:41

== Personnel ==
- Johnny "Hammond" Smith – organ
- Seldon Powell – tenor saxophone
- Clement Wells – vibraphone
- Wally Richardson – guitar
- Leo Stevens – drums

=== Production ===
- Esmond Edwards – producer
- Rudy Van Gelder – engineer
