= Gambler's Life =

Studio album by Johnny Hammond
- Released: 1974
- Recorded: June 1974
- Studio: The Sound Factory, Hollywood, California
- Genre: Jazz-funk
- Length: 51:29
- Label: CTI
- Producer: Larry Mizell

Johnny Hammond chronology
Higher Ground (1973)	Gambler's Life (1974)	Gears (1975)

Professional ratings
Review scores
Source	Rating
Allmusic	4/5 stars

Gambler's Life is an album by jazz keyboardist Johnny Hammond. It was released in 1974 and produced by Larry Mizell.

== Track listing ==
1. Gambler's Life 5:45 (Larry Mizell)
2. Rhodesian Thoroughfare 6:06 (Chuck Davis, Sigidi Abdallah)
3. This Year's Dream 6:19 (Johnny Hammond)
4. Star Borne 7:51 (L. Mizell)
5. Back To The Projects 5:36 (L. Mizell)
6. Yesterday Was Cool 6:50 (L. Mizell, William Jordan)
7. Virgo Lady 6:41 (Hammond)
8. Call On Me 4:30 (Fonce Mizell, L. Mizell)

== Personnel ==
- Johnny Hammond - Synthesizer, Electric Piano
- Larry Mizell - Keyboards (Solina), Backing Vocals
- Fonce Mizell - Clavinet, Trumpet, Backing Vocals
- Jerry Peters - Piano
- Harvey Mason, Fritz Wise - Drums
- Henry Franklin, Tony Dumas - Bass
- John Rowin, Mel Bolton, Melvin Ragin - Guitar
- King Errisson - Congas
- Al Hall - Trombone
- Carl Randell, Jr - Saxophone
- Stephanie Spruill - Percussion, Vocals
- Freddie Perren, Backing Vocals

== Production ==
- Arranged by Johnny Hammond (tracks 3 and 8) and the Mizell brothers (all others)
- Produced by Larry and Fonce Mizell for Sky High Productions, Inc.
- Recording Engineers: David Hassinger; assisted by John Mills and Val Garay
- Mixed by David Hassinger
- Mastered by Arnie Acosta
- Tracks 3 and 7 published by Char-Liz Music. Track 8 published by Jobete Music Co., Inc. All others published by Alruby Music, Inc.
