= Seldon Powell =

American jazz musician (1928–1997)

- Born: November 15, 1928; Lawrenceville, Virginia, U.S.
- Died: January 25, 1997 (aged 68) Hempstead, New York, U.S.
- Genres: Soul jazz; swing; R&B
- Occupation: Musician
- Instruments: Tenor saxophone; flute

Seldon Powell (November 15, 1928 – January 25, 1997) was an American tenor saxophonist and flautist whose work spanned multiple genres, including jazz and rhythm and blues.

== Background ==
Powell worked with Tab Smith (1949), Lucky Millinder (1949–51), Neal Hefti, Louis Bellson, and Jimmy Witherspoon. During the 1960s, he ventured into the soul jazz idiom and worked with Clark Terry, Lou Donaldson, Johnny "Hammond" Smith, and Buddy Rich.

== Discography ==
=== As leader ===
- Seldon Powell Plays (Roost 1955 [1956], reissued by Roulette, 1973))
- Seldon Powell featuring Jimmy Cleveland (Roost, 1956)
- Rhythm Plus One (Fresh Sound, 1956 [1984], LP reissue of selections from the above)
- At the Hop (PMI)
- Messin' with Seldon Powell (Encounter, 1973)

=== As sideman ===
With Tony Aless

- Long Island Suite (Roost, 1955)

With Mose Allison

- Hello There, Universe (Atlantic, 1970)

With Albert Ayler

- New Grass (Impulse!, 1968)

With Chet Baker

- Baker's Holiday (Limelight, 1965)

With Gato Barbieri

- Chapter Three, Viva Emiliano Zapata (Impulse!, 1974)

With Aaron Bell

- Music from Peter Gunn (Lion, 1959)
- Music from Victory at Sea (Lion, 1959)

With Louis Bellson

- The Driving Louis Bellson (Norgran, 1955)

With Billy Butler

- Guitar Soul! (Prestige, 1969)

With Anthony Braxton

- Creative Orchestra Music 1976 (Arista, 1976)

With Rusty Bryant

- Until It's Time for You to Go (Prestige, 1974)

With Charlie Byrd

- Byrd at the Gate (Riverside, 1963)

With Hank Crawford

- Mr. Blues Plays Lady Soul (Atlantic, 1969)

With Bobby Donaldson

- Jazz Unlimited (Golden Crest, 1960)

With Charles Earland

- Charles III (Prestige, 1973)

With Art Farmer

- The Aztec Suite (United Artists, 1959)

With Jimmy Forrest

- Soul Street (New Jazz, 1962)

With Ronnie Foster

- Sweet Revival (Blue Note, 1972)

With Panama Francis

- The beat behind million sellers (ABC, 1960)
- Tough Talk (20th Century Fox, 1964)

With Friedrich Gulda

- Friedrich Gulda at Birdland (RCA Victor, 1957)
- A Man of Letters (Decca, 1957)

With Eddie Harris

- Silver Cycles (Atlantic, 1968)

With Neal Hefti

- Hot'n Hearty (Epic, 1955)

With Groove Holmes

- Night Glider (Groove Merchant, 1973)

With Quincy Jones

- Quincy Jones Explores the Music of Henry Mancini (Mercury, 1964)
- Quincy Plays for Pussycats (Mercury, 1965)

With Rufus "Speedy" Jones

- Five on Eight (Cameo)

With Looking Glass

- Subway Serenade (Epic, 1973)

With Ahmed Abdul-Malik

- Spellbound (Status, 1964)

With Arif Mardin

- Journey (Atlantic, 1974)

With Les McCann

- Les McCann Plays the Hits (Limelight, 1966)
- Comment (Atlantic, 1970)
- Another Beginning (Atlantic, 1974)

With Jack McDuff

- The Fourth Dimension (Cadet, 1974)

With Gary McFarland

- Soft Samba (Verve, 1963)

With Jimmy McGriff

- The Big Band (Solid State, 1966)

With Blue Mitchell

- Many Shades of Blue (Mainstream, 1974)

With Modern Jazz Quartet

- Jazz Dialogue (Atlantic, 1965)

With David "Fathead" Newman

- Bigger & Better (Atlantic, 1968)

With Chico O'Farrill

- Nine Flags (Impulse!, 1966)

With Sy Oliver

- Annie Laurie (Sesac, 1960)
- Easy Walker (Sesac, 1962)

With Jimmy Owens

- Headin' Home (A&M/Horizon, 1978)

With Oliver Nelson

- The Spirit of '67 with Pee Wee Russell (Impulse!, 1967)

With Reuben Phillips

- Manhattan...3 a.m. (Poplar, 1960)

With Bernard Purdie

- Soul Drums (Date, 1967)
- Stand by Me (Whatcha See Is Whatcha Get) (Mega, 1971)
- Soul Is... Pretty Purdie (Flying Dutchman, 1972)

With Buddy Rich

- The Driver (EmArcy, 1960)

With Willie Rodriguez

- Flatjacks (Riverside, 1964)

With A. K. Salim

- Blues Suite (Savoy, 1958)

With Eddie Sauter

- The Sauter-Finegan Orchestra – Directions in Music (RCA, 1952–58)

With Johnny "Hammond" Smith

- Black Coffee (Riverside, 1962)
- Look Out! (New Jazz, 1962)
- Open House! (Riverside, 1963)

With Leon Spencer

- Where I'm Coming From (Prestige, 1973)

With Sonny Stitt

- Sonny Stitt Plays Arrangements from the Pen of Quincy Jones (Roost, 1955)
- I Keep Comin' Back! (Roulette, 1966)

With Billy Taylor

- Billy Taylor with Four Flutes (Riverside, 1959)
- Brazilian Beat (Sesac, 1963)

With Clark Terry

- Color Changes (Candid, 1960)
- What makes Sammy swing (20th Century Fox, 1963)
- Tread Ye Lightly (Cameo, 1963)

With Joe Thomas

- Joy of Cookin' (Groove Merchant, 1972)

With Teri Thornton

- Devil May Care (Riverside, 1961)

With Cal Tjader

- Warm Wave (Verve, 1964)
- Soul Burst (Verve, 1966)

With Ernie Wilkins

- The Big New Band of the 60's (Everest, 1960)

With Jimmy Witherspoon

- Goin' to Kansas City Blues (RCA Victor, 1958) with Jay McShann

With Galt MacDermot

- La Novela (Kilmarnock, 1971)
- The Sun Always Shines for the Cool (Kilmarnock, 1972)
- Dude – The Highway Life (Kilmarnock, 1972)
- Take This Bread (Kilmarnock, 1973)
- The Joker of Seville (Kilmarnock, 1974)
- HAIR Movie Soundtrack (Kilmarnock, 1979)
- New Pulse Jazz Band – Uncle Shout (Kilmarnock, 1979)
- New Pulse Jazz Band – Pulse On!! (Kilmarnock, 1981)
- The Human Comedy (Kilmarnock, 1982)
- New Pulse Jazz Band – New Pulse III (Kilmarnock, (1983)
- New Pulse Jazz Band – Boogie Man (Kilmarnock, 1985)
- New Pulse Jazz Band – Lost Conquest (Kilmarnock, 1986)
- The Solo Genius of Seldon Powell (Kilmarnock, 2017)
- Ah! New York (Instrumental) – (Kilmarnock, 2024)
