= All Soul (Johnny "Hammond" Smith album) =

Studio album by Johnny "Hammond" Smith
- Released: 1959
- Recorded: September 11, 1959
- Studio: Van Gelder Studio, Englewood Cliffs
- Genre: Jazz
- Length: 38:56
- Label: New Jazz; NJ 8221
- Producer: Esmond Edwards

Johnny "Hammond" Smith chronology
Imagination (1959)	All Soul (1959)	That Good Feelin' (1959)

All Soul is an album by jazz organist Johnny "Hammond" Smith recorded for the New Jazz label in 1959.

== Reception ==
Professional ratings
Review scores
Source	Rating
Allmusic	3/5 stars
DownBeat	3/5 stars

Stewart Mason in his review for Allmusic stated, "Smith would go on to make better albums, but All Soul is a promising debut".

== Track listing ==
All compositions by Johnny "Hammond" Smith except where noted.

1. " Goin' Places" – 6:49
2. "Sweet Cookies" – 6:34
3. "The Masquerade is Over" (Herb Magidson, Allie Wrubel) – 4:42
4. "Pennies from Heaven" (Johnny Burke, Arthur Johnston) – 4:35
5. "Easy Like" – 7:30
6. "Secret Love" (Sammy Fain, Paul Francis Webster) – 4:30
7. "All Soul" (Curtis Lewis) – 4:16

== Personnel ==
- Johnny "Hammond" Smith – organ
- Thornel Schwartz – guitar
- George Tucker – bass
- Leo Stevens – drums

=== Production ===
- Esmond Edwards – producer
- Rudy Van Gelder – engineer
