= Johnny "Hammond" Cooks with Gator Tail =

Studio album by Johnny "Hammond" Smith & Willis Jackson
- Released: 1962
- Recorded: June 12, 1962
- Studio: Van Gelder Studio, Englewood Cliffs
- Genre: Jazz
- Label: Prestige; PR 7239
- Producer: Esmond Edwards

Johnny "Hammond" Smith chronology
Opus De Funk (1961)	Johnny "Hammond" Cooks with Gator Tail (1962)	Look Out! (1962)

Willis Jackson chronology
Thunderbird (1962)	Johnny "Hammond" Cooks with Gator Tail (1962)	Bossa Nova Plus (1962)

Johnny "Hammond" Cooks with Gator Tail is an album by jazz organist Johnny "Hammond" Smith and saxophonist Willis Jackson recorded for the Prestige label in 1962.

== Reception ==
Professional ratings
Review scores
Source	Rating
AllMusic	3/5 stars

AllMusic writer Richie Unterberger awarded the album 3 stars and stating "This Smith/Jackson joint session is typical early-'60s Prestige soul-jazz, with all the good and bad that implies".

== Track listing ==
All compositions by Johnny "Hammond" Smith except where noted.

1. "Good 'Nuff"
2. "Nobody Knows the Trouble I've Seen" (Traditional)
3. "Sonja's Dreamland"
4. "Bésame Mucho" (Sunny Skylar, Consuelo Velázquez)
5. " Y'all" (Willis Jackson)
6. "Neckbones"
7. "Delicious"

== Personnel ==
- Johnny "Hammond" Smith – organ
- Willis Jackson – tenor saxophone
- Eddie McFadden – guitar
- Leo Stevens – drums
- Esmond Edwards – producer
- Rudy Van Gelder – engineer
