= Black Feeling! =

Studio album by Johnny "Hammond" Smith
- Released: 1970
- Recorded: December 22, 1969
- Studio: Van Gelder Studio, Englewood Cliffs
- Genre: Jazz
- Label: Prestige; PR 7736
- Producer: Bob Porter

Johnny "Hammond" Smith chronology
Soul Talk (1969)	Black Feeling! (1970)	Here It 'Tis (1970)

Black Feeling! is an album by jazz organist Johnny "Hammond" Smith recorded for the Prestige label in 1969.

== Reception ==
Professional ratings
Review scores
Source	Rating
Allmusic	3/5 stars

The Allmusic site awarded the album 3 stars stating "Without varying his basic template that much, Smith did employ a much fuller combo for Black Feeling!".

== Track listing ==
All compositions by Johnny "Hammond" Smith except where noted.

1. "Black Feeling" (Leo Johnson) – 6:30
2. "Kindra" (Johnson) – 5:40
3. "Johnny Hammond Boogaloo" (Wally Richardson) – 5:00
4. "Dig On It" (Johnson) – 7:55
5. "When Sunny Gets Blue" (Marvin Fisher, Jack Segal) – 4:25
6. "Soul Talk-1970" – 6:20

== Personnel ==
- Johnny "Hammond" Smith – organ
- Virgil Jones – trumpet
- Rusty Bryant, Leo Johnson – tenor saxophone
- Wally Richardson – guitar
- Jimmy Lewis – electric bass
- Bernard Purdie – drums

Production

- Bob Porter – producer
- Rudy Van Gelder – engineer
