= Mr. Wonderful (Johnny "Hammond" Smith album) =

Studio album by Johnny "Hammond" Smith
- Released: 1963
- Recorded: 1963; New York City
- Genre: Jazz
- Label: Riverside; RLP 466
- Producer: Orrin Keepnews and Ed Michel

Johnny "Hammond" Smith chronology
Black Coffee (1962)	Mr. Wonderful (1963)	Open House! (1963)

Mr. Wonderful is an album by jazz organist Johnny "Hammond" Smith which was recorded in 1963 and released on the Riverside label.

== Reception ==
Professional ratings
Review scores
Source	Rating
Allmusic	3/5 stars

The Allmusic site awarded the album 3 stars calling it "A fine set that holds some appeal for the straight jazz crowd as well as the organ soul-jazz clique."

== Track listing ==
All compositions by Johnny "Hammond" Smith except as indicated

1. "Blues for De-De" - 4:59
2. "Mr. Wonderful" (Jerry Bock, George David Weiss, Larry Holofcener) - 5:19
3. "Cyra" - 4:20
4. "Lambert's Lodge" - 3:40
5. "Love Letters" (Victor Young, Edward Heyman) - 5:40
6. "Blues on Sunday" - 4:46
7. "Departure" - 5:52
8. "Opus 2" - 4:28

== Personnel ==
- Johnny "Hammond" Smith - Hammond B3 organ
- Sonny Williams - trumpet
- Houston Person — tenor saxophone
- Eddie McFadden - guitar (tracks 1, 4, 7 & 8)
- Leo Stevens - drums
