= Opus De Funk (album) =

Studio album by Johnny "Hammond" Smith
- Released: 1966
- Recorded: February 14 and May 12, 1961
- Studio: Van Gelder Studio, Englewood Cliffs
- Genre: Jazz
- Label: Prestige; PR 7420
- Producer: Esmond Edwards

Johnny "Hammond" Smith chronology
Stimulation (1961)	Opus De Funk (1966)	Johnny "Hammond" Cooks with Gator Tail (1962)

Opus De Funk is an album by jazz organist Johnny "Hammond" Smith recorded for the Prestige label in 1961 but not released until 1966.

== Reception ==
Professional ratings
Review scores
Source	Rating
AllMusic	4/5 stars

AllMusic awarded the album 4 stars stating "The really unusual element here is the presence of McCoy, because one doesn't usually associate vibes with jazz organ combos. The vibes work, however, and give the resonance of Smith's organ a lighter counterpoint that brightens up the overall sound".

== Track listing ==
All compositions by Johnny "Hammond" Smith except where noted.

1. "Opus de Funk" (Horace Silver) – 5:19
2. "Almost Like Being in Love" (Alan Jay Lerner, Frederick Loewe) – 4:27
3. "Autumn Leaves" (Joseph Kosma, Johnny Mercer) – 4:11
4. "Sad Eyes" – 4:50
5. "Gone With the Wind" (Herb Magidson, Allie Wrubel) – 5:45
6. "If Someone Had Told Me" (Peter DeRose, Charles Tobias) – 4:31
7. "Shirley's Theme" – 4:39
- Recorded at Van Gelder Studio in Englewood Cliffs, New Jersey on February 14 (tracks 1–3) and May 12 (tracks 4–7), 1961.

== Personnel ==
- Johnny "Hammond" Smith – organ
- Freddie McCoy – vibraphone
- Eddie McFadden – guitar
- Wendell Marshall – bass
- Leo Stevens – drums
- Esmond Edwards – producer
- Rudy Van Gelder – engineer
