= Freddie McCoy =

American jazz vibraphonist (1932–2009)

- Born: November 29, 1932
- Died: September 27, 2009 (aged 76)
- Genres: Soul Jazz
- Occupation: Musician
- Instrument: Vibraphone
- Years active: 1960s–1970s
- Labels: Prestige; Cobblestone

Freddie McCoy (November 29, 1932 – September 27, 2009) was an American soul jazz vibraphonist. He started his career with Johnny "Hammond" Smith, in 1961, and released seven albums for Prestige Records plus one in 1971 for the short-lived Cobblestone Records, before leaving the music industry.

McCoy died in September 2009, aged 76.

== Discography ==
=== As leader ===
- Lonely Avenue (Prestige, 1965)
- Spider Man (Prestige, 1965)
- Funk Drops (Prestige, 1966)
- Peas 'n' Rice (Prestige, 1967)
- Beans & Greens (Prestige, 1967)
- Soul Yogi (Prestige, 1968)
- Listen Here (Prestige, 1968)
- Gimme Some! (Cobblestone, 1971)

=== As sideman ===
With Johnny "Hammond" Smith

- Stimulation (Prestige, 1961)
- Opus De Funk (Prestige, 1961 [1966])
