= Cal Lampley =

American record producer (1924–2006)

- Born: Calvin Douglas Lampley; March 4, 1924; Dunn, North Carolina
- Died: July 6, 2006 (aged 82) Baltimore
- Genres: Jazz music classical music
- Occupations: composer, producer, music critic, teacher
- Labels: Prestige, Columbia, Warner Bros.
- Formerly of: Miles Davis and many others

Cal Lampley (March 4, 1924 – July 6, 2006) was an American composer and record producer.

Lampley was born in Dunn, NC. as the second child of Hettie Marina and William Lorenzo Lampley, and had a brother named William Elwood. He graduated with a B.S. from North Carolina Agricultural and Technical State University in Greensboro, North Carolina. His first known music contribution was as an organist of the Chapel Hill Presbyterian Church, which was pastored by Rev. Charles Jones and whose congregation included Frank Porter Graham, President of the University of North Carolina. The church became the first in Chapel Hill to integrate when some members of the Navy B-1 band began attending services and social events there and church-sponsored events at the Forest Theatre. B-1 was composed of the first African Americans to serve in the modern Navy at general rank, and most of its members had NC A and T connections and knew Lampley from Greensboro's lively music scene. Lampley himself served two and a half years in the Army Infantry.

Lampley moved to New York City in 1946 to continue his education at the Juilliard School of Music. With an Artist Diploma in 1949 in piano after three years under the direction of piano teacher Irwin Freundlich and composer Richard Franko Goldman, Lampley debuted his performance as a pianist at the Carnegie Hall concert in 1950.

He gained employment as a tape editor at Columbia Records. During Lampley's 9-year stint with Columbia, he rose to the position of Recording Director of the Popular Albums Department. He was later hired by record producer George Avakian to work as an A&R and as a record producer for music labels such as Columbia, Warner Bros., RCA/Victor, and Prestige. He worked with artists including Miles Davis, Mahalia Jackson, Dave Brubeck, Art Blakey, Leonard Bernstein, Freddie McCoy and Louis Armstrong.

Lampley's other collaborations were with classical, jazz and pop musicians such as Nina Simone, Robert Casadesus, Zino Francescatti, Guiomar Novaes, Johnny Mathis, Genevieve, Victor Borge, Carmel Quinn, Arthur Godfrey, Tab Hunter, Bill Haley, Lonnie Sattin, and Chico Hamilton. His own version of the composition "Misty" by jazz musician Richard "Groove" Holmes was Prestige's Records biggest single in its entire history; it peaked at number 44 on the Billboard charts in 1966. In tribute to his musical contribution to the city and the state, Mayor Kurt L. Schmoke officially promulgated the "Cal Lampley Day" on May 1, 1994 in Baltimore at a City Hall ceremony.

On July 6, 2006 Lampley died at the Baltimore Washington Medical Center in Baltimore from complications of multiple sclerosis.
